= 1999 IIHF Asian Oceanic Junior U18 Championship =

Tournament details
- Host countries: Japan; North Korea
- Dates: 10 – 13 February 1999; 20 – 25 March 1999
- Teams: 8

Final positions
- Champions: Japan (10th title)
- Runner-up: South Korea
- Third place: China

Tournament statistics
- Games played: 12
- Goals scored: 277 (23.08 per game)

The 1999 IIHF Asian Oceanic Junior U18 Championship was the 16th edition of the IIHF Asian Oceanic Junior U18 Championship. For the first time the Championship was split into two separate divisions as the number of teams competing increased to eight. The Division I tournament took place between 10 and 13 February 2000 in Nikkō, Japan and the Division II tournament took place between 20 and 25 March 1999 in Pyongyang, North Korea. The Division I tournament was won by Japan, who claimed their tenth title by winning all three of their games and finishing first in the standings. Upon winning the tournament Japan gained promotion to Pool B of the 2000 IIHF World U18 Championships. South Korea and China finished second and third respectively.

In the Division II tournament North Korea finished first and gained promotion to Division I for the 2000 IIHF Asian Oceanic Junior U18 Championship.

== Overview ==
Following the format change the teams from the 1998 Championships were reseeded into either the Division I or the Division II tournaments. Australia, China, Japan and South Korea were seeded into the Division I competition while New Zealand and Thailand were seeded into the Division II tournament. The Division I tournament began on 10 February in Nikkō, Japan. Japan won the tournament after winning all three of their games and claimed their tenth title of the championship. Following their win Japan gained promotion to Pool B of the 2000 IIHF World U18 Championships. South Korea finished second after losing one game to Japan and China finished third after losing to Japan and South Korea. Kim Han-Sung of South Korea finished as the top scorer for the tournament with 12 points including 11 goals and one assist.

The Division II tournament began on 20 March 1999 in Pyongyang, North Korea. Chinese Taipei and South Africa made their debut appearance at the Championships and in international competition. The tournament was originally meant to involve Hong Kong, Singapore and Thailand however all three teams withdrew prior to the start of the tournament. North Korea who returned to the Championships having not played since the 1992 Championship, won the tournament after winning final against South Africa and gained promotion to Division I for the 2000 IIHF Asian Oceanic Junior U18 Championship. South Africa finished second as a result of losing the final and New Zealand finished third after winning the third place game against Chinese Taipei.

== Division I ==
=== Standings ===
Pos	Team	Pld	W	D	L	GF	GA	GD	Pts
1	Japan	3	3	0	0	36	5	+31	6
2	South Korea	3	2	0	1	24	11	+13	4
3	China	3	1	0	2	15	19	−4	2
4	Australia	3	0	0	3	0	40	−40	0

=== Fixtures ===
Australia	0 – 14	South Korea	Nikkō

Japan	13 – 1	China	Nikkō

South Korea	6 – 3	China	Nikkō

Japan	15 – 0	Australia	Nikkō

Japan	8 – 4	South Korea	Nikkō

China	11 – 0	Australia	Nikkō

== Division II ==
=== Standings ===
Pos	Team	Pld	W	D	L	GF	GA	GD	Pts
1	North Korea	3	3	0	0	56	3	+53	6
2	South Africa	3	2	0	1	38	10	+28	4
3	New Zealand	3	1	0	2	20	27	−7	2
4	Chinese Taipei	3	0	0	3	4	78	−74	0

=== Fixtures ===
Chinese Taipei	3 – 20	New Zealand	Pyongyang

North Korea	9 – 3	South Africa	Pyongyang

New Zealand	0 – 1	South Africa	Pyongyang

North Korea	24 – 0	Chinese Taipei	Pyongyang

North Korea	23 – 0	New Zealand	Pyongyang

South Africa	34 – 1	Chinese Taipei	Pyongyang

==== Semi-finals ====
North Korea	29 – 0	Chinese Taipei	Pyongyang

South Africa	15 – 0	New Zealand	Pyongyang

==== Third place game ====
New Zealand	26 – 4	Chinese Taipei	Pyongyang

==== Final ====
North Korea	9 – 1	South Africa	Pyongyang
