= 1987 IIHF Asian Oceanic Junior U18 Championship =

Tournament details
- Host country: China
- Dates: 15 – 22 February
- Teams: 5

Final positions
- Champions: North Korea (1st title)
- Runner-up: China
- Third place: Japan
- Fourth place: Australia

Tournament statistics
- Games played: 10
- Scoring leader(s): (Australia) Charlie Cooper

The 1987 IIHF Asian Oceanic Junior U18 Championship was the fourth edition of the IIHF Asian Oceanic Junior U18 Championship. It took place between 15 and 22 February 1987 in Jilin, China. The tournament was won by North Korea, who claimed their first title by finishing first in the standings. China and Japan finished second and third respectively.

== Standings ==
Rk	Team	GP	W	T	L	GF	GA	GDF	PTS
Gold medal	North Korea	4	3	0	1	31	9	+22	6
Silver medal	China	4	3	0	1	17	9	+8	6
Bronze medal	Japan	4	3	0	1	22	8	+14	6
4	Australia	4	1	0	3	14	35	–21	2
5	South Korea	4	0	0	4	9	32	–23	0

== Fixtures ==
Japan	1 – 5	North Korea

China	5 – 3	South Korea

Japan	9 – 0	Australia

China	3 – 1	North Korea

North Korea	11 – 1	South Korea

China	7 – 2	Australia

North Korea	14 – 4	Australia

Japan	9 – 1	South Korea

Australia	7 – 5	South Korea

China	2 – 3	Japan
