= 1997 IIHF Asian Oceanic Junior U18 Championship =

Tournament details
- Host country: South Korea
- Dates: 14 – 17 March
- Teams: 4

Final positions
- Champions: Japan (9th title)
- Runner-up: Kazakhstan
- Third place: South Korea
- Fourth place: China

Tournament statistics
- Games played: 6
- Scoring leader(s): (South Korea) Dong-Hwan Song

The 1997 IIHF Asian Oceanic Junior U18 Championship was the 14th edition of the IIHF Asian Oceanic Junior U18 Championship. It took place between 14 and 17 March 1997 in Seoul, South Korea. The tournament was won by Japan, who claimed their ninth title by finishing first in the standings. Kazakhstan and South Korea finished second and third respectively.

== Standings ==
Pos	Team	Pld	W	D	L	GF	GA	GD	Pts
1	Japan	3	3	0	0	20	8	+12	6
2	Kazakhstan	3	2	0	1	15	11	+4	4
3	South Korea	3	1	0	2	18	15	+3	2
4	China	3	0	0	3	7	26	−19	0

== Fixtures ==
South Korea	10 – 4	China

Kazakhstan	2 – 6	Japan

Japan	10 – 3	China

South Korea	5 – 7	Kazakhstan

South Korea	3 – 4	Japan

Kazakhstan	6 – 0	China
