= 1992 IIHF Asian Oceanic Junior U18 Championship =

Tournament details
- Host country: Japan
- Dates: 16 – 22 March
- Teams: 5

Final positions
- Champions: Japan (7th title)
- Runner-up: North Korea
- Third place: China

Tournament statistics
- Games played: 10
- Scoring leader(s): (Japan) Daisuke Sasoya

The 1992 IIHF Asian Oceanic Junior U18 Championship was the ninth edition of the IIHF Asian Oceanic Junior U18 Championship. It took place between 16 and 22 March 1992 in Harutori in Kushiro, Japan. The tournament was won by Japan, who claimed their seventh title by finishing first in the standings. North Korea and China finished second and third respectively.

== Standings ==
Pos	Team	Pld	W	D	L	GF	GA	GD	Pts
1	Japan	4	3	1	0	36	3	+33	7
2	North Korea	4	3	1	0	22	6	+16	7
3	China	4	2	0	2	20	16	+4	4
4	South Korea	4	1	0	3	12	25	−13	2
5	Australia	4	0	0	4	11	51	−40	0

== Fixtures ==
China	5 – 2	South Korea

Japan	20 – 0	Australia

North Korea	8 – 3	Australia

Japan	9 – 1	South Korea

South Korea	9 – 4	Australia

North Korea	5 – 1	China

China	14 – 4	Australia

Japan	2 – 2	North Korea

North Korea	7 – 0	South Korea

Japan	5 – 0	China
