= 1986 IIHF Asian Oceanic Junior U18 Championship =

Tournament details
- Host country: Australia
- Dates: 15 – 22 February
- Teams: 4

Final positions
- Champions: Japan (3rd title)
- Runner-up: China
- Third place: South Korea
- Fourth place: Australia

Tournament statistics
- Games played: 12
- Scoring leader(s): (Japan) Hiroshi Matsuura

The 1986 IIHF Asian Oceanic Junior U18 Championship was the third edition of the IIHF Asian Oceanic Junior U18 Championship. It took place between 15 and 22 February 1986 in Adelaide, Australia. The tournament was won by Japan, who claimed their third title by finishing first in the standings. China and South Korea finished second and third respectively.

== Standings ==
| Rk | Team | GP | W | T | L | GF | GA | GDF | PTS |
|---|---|---|---|---|---|---|---|---|---|
| Gold medal | Japan | 6 | 5 | 0 | 1 | 68 | 14 | +54 | 10 |
| Silver medal | China | 6 | 4 | 1 | 1 | 25 | 26 | -1 | 9 |
| Bronze medal | South Korea | 6 | 1 | 1 | 4 | 15 | 43 | -28 | 3 |
| 4 | Australia | 6 | 1 | 0 | 5 | 18 | 40 | –22 | 2 |

== Fixtures ==
| Australia | 2 – 4 | South Korea |

| China | 5 – 3 | Japan |

| Japan | 11 – 1 | South Korea |

| Australia | 3 – 6 | China |

| South Korea | 4 – 4 | China |

| Australia | 3 – 12 | Japan |

| Japan | 12 – 1 | China |

| Australia | 7 – 1 | South Korea |

| South Korea | 2 – 13 | Japan |

| Australia | 1 – 3 | China |

| China | 6 – 3 | South Korea |

| Australia | 2 – 14 | Japan |
