= 1984 IIHF Asian Oceanic Junior U18 Championship =

Tournament details
- Host country: Japan
- Dates: 23 – 30 March
- Teams: 4

Final positions
- Champions: Japan (1st title)
- Runner-up: China
- Third place: South Korea

Tournament statistics
- Games played: 12
- Scoring leader(s): (Japan) Noritsugo Saito

The 1984 IIHF Asian Oceanic Junior U18 Championship was the first edition of the IIHF Asian Oceanic Junior U18 Championship. It took place between 23 and 30 March 1984 in Kushiro and Tomakomai, Japan. The tournament was won by Japan, who claimed their first title by finishing first in the standings. China and South Korea finished second and third respectively.

== Standings ==
Pos	Team	Pld	W	D	L	GF	GA	GD	Pts
1	Japan	6	6	0	0	64	9	+55	12
2	China	6	4	0	2	48	24	+24	8
3	South Korea	6	2	0	4	22	43	−21	4
4	Australia	6	0	0	6	9	67	−58	0

== Fixtures ==
Japan	6 – 0	South Korea

China	13 – 0	Australia

China	10 – 1	South Korea

Japan	15 – 1	Australia

South Korea	8 – 4	Australia

China	4 – 13	Japan

South Korea	2 – 12	Japan

Australia	0 – 11	Japan

South Korea	2 – 8	China

Australia	1 – 11	China

Australia	3 – 9	South Korea

Japan	7 – 2	China
