= Alexei Koledayev =

Kazakhstani ice hockey player

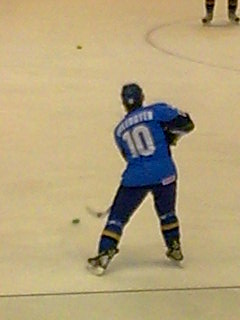
- Alexei Koledayev, was a Kazakhstani ice hockey player.
- Born: March 27, 1976 (age 48); Ust-Kamenogorsk, Soviet Union
- Height: 5 ft 10 in (178 cm)
- Weight: 196 lb (89 kg; 14 st 0 lb)
- Position: Defence
- Shot: Left
- Played for: Torpedo Ust-Kamenogorsk; Metallurg Novokuznetsk; Sibir Novosibirsk
- National team: Kazakhstan
- NHL draft: Undrafted
- Playing career: 1992–2017

Alexei Nikolaevich Koledaev (born March 27, 1976) is a Kazakhstani former professional ice hockey defenceman.

Koledaev played the majority of his career with Metallurg Novokuznetsk. He also played for Torpedo Ust-Kamenogorsk and HC Sibir Novosibirsk. He was also a member of the Kazakhstan national team, playing in three Ice Hockey World Championships (2005, 2006 and 2010) as well as the 2006 Winter Olympics.

== Career statistics ==
=== Regular season and playoffs ===
			Regular season					Playoffs
Season	Team	League	GP	G	A	Pts	PIM	GP	G	A	Pts	PIM
1992–93	Torpedo–2 Ust–Kamenogorsk	RUS.2	8	1	0	1	4	—	—	—	—	—
1993–94	Torpedo Ust–Kamenogorsk	IHL	1	0	0	0	0	—	—	—	—	—
1993–94	Torpedo–2 Ust–Kamenogorsk	RUS.3			1			—	—	—	—	—
1994–95	SK Belovo	RUS.2	19	0	1	1	14	—	—	—	—	—
1995–96	Metallurg Novokuznetsk	IHL	52	1	1	2	32	—	—	—	—	—
1995–96	Metallurg–2 Novokuznetsk	RUS.2	1	0	0	0	0	—	—	—	—	—
1996–97	Metallurg Novokuznetsk	RSL	21	2	1	3	8	—	—	—	—	—
1997–98	Metallurg Novokuznetsk	RSL	26	0	0	0	14	—	—	—	—	—
1998–99	Metallurg Novokuznetsk	RSL	41	1	5	6	16	6	0	0	0	2
1999–2000	Metallurg Novokuznetsk	RSL	34	3	2	5	18	13	0	1	1	6
2000–01	Metallurg Novokuznetsk	RSL	40	2	4	6	20	—	—	—	—	—
2001–02	Metallurg Novokuznetsk	RSL	44	2	9	11	26	—	—	—	—	—
2002–03	Metallurg Novokuznetsk	RSL	41	1	5	6	12	—	—	—	—	—
2003–04	Metallurg Novokuznetsk	RSL	56	0	2	2	26	3	0	0	0	0
2003–04	Metallurg–2 Novokuznetsk	RUS.3	4	1	3	4	6	—	—	—	—	—
2004–05	Metallurg Novokuznetsk	RSL	44	2	3	5	28	4	0	0	0	2
2004–05	Metallurg–2 Novokuznetsk	RUS.3	2	0	0	0	2	—	—	—	—	—
2005–06	Sibir Novosibirsk	RSL	36	1	2	3	28	4	0	1	1	2
2005–06	Sibir–2 Novosibirsk	RUS.3	1	1	1	2	2	—	—	—	—	—
2006–07	Sibir Novosibirsk	RSL	40	4	3	7	32	3	0	0	0	0
2006–07	Sibir–2 Novosibirsk	RUS.3	1	0	0	0	0	—	—	—	—	—
2007–08	Kazzinc–Torpedo	RUS.2	51	4	11	15	79	7	1	1	2	8
2008–09	Metallurg Novokuznetsk	KHL	56	4	5	9	42	—	—	—	—	—
2009–10	Metallurg Novokuznetsk	KHL	56	2	4	6	46	—	—	—	—	—
2010–11	Metallurg Novokuznetsk	KHL	44	0	1	1	24	—	—	—	—	—
2011–12	Kazzinc–Torpedo	VHL	53	1	7	8	54	3	0	1	1	2
2012–13	Kazzinc–Torpedo	VHL	47	2	15	17	26	3	0	0	0	0
2013–14	Sokol Krasnoyarsk	VHL	50	0	3	3	32	2	0	0	0	2
2014–15	Kazzinc–Torpedo	VHL	25	0	4	4	14	—	—	—	—	—
2015–16	PSK Sakhalin	ALH	48	1	13	14	56	8	0	1	1	4
2016–17	PSK Sakhalin	ALH	32	2	9	11	36	7	0	2	2	2
IHL & RSL totals			476	19	37	56	260	33	0	2	2	12
KHL totals			156	6	10	16	112	—	—	—	—	—
RUS.2/VHL totals			254	8	41	49	223	15	1	2	3	12

=== International ===
Year	Team	Event	GP	G	A	Pts	PIM
1993	Kazakhstan	AJC	4	1	0	1	29
1994	Kazakhstan	AJC	4	1	2	3	6
1999	Kazakhstan	WC B	7	2	1	3	33
2005	Kazakhstan	OGQ	3	0	0	0	2
2005	Kazakhstan	WC	6	0	1	1	2
2006	Kazakhstan	OG	5	0	0	0	10
2006	Kazakhstan	WC	6	0	0	0	6
2010	Kazakhstan	WC	6	0	1	1	2
2011	Kazakhstan	AWG	4	2	0	2	4
2011	Kazakhstan	WC D1	5	0	1	1	4
Junior totals			8	2	2	4	35
Senior totals			42	4	4	8	51
