= 1988 IIHF Asian Oceanic Junior U18 Championship =

Tournament details
- Host country: Australia
- Dates: 6 – 13 February
- Teams: 4

Final positions
- Champions: China (1st title)
- Runner-up: Japan
- Third place: South Korea

Tournament statistics
- Games played: 12
- Scoring leader(s): (Japan) Kikuchi Yoshiyuki

The 1988 IIHF Asian Oceanic Junior U18 Championship was the fifth edition of the IIHF Asian Oceanic Junior U18 Championship. It took place between 6 and 13 February 1988 in Bendigo, Australia. The tournament was won by China, who claimed their first title by finishing first in the standings. Japan and South Korea finished second and third respectively.

== Standings ==
Pos	Team	Pld	W	D	L	GF	GA	GD	Pts
1	China	6	5	1	0	50	13	+37	11
2	Japan	6	4	1	1	59	19	+40	9
3	South Korea	6	2	0	4	42	53	−11	4
4	Australia	6	0	0	6	14	80	−66	0

== Fixtures ==
China	10 – 2	South Korea

Australia	0 – 10	Japan

Australia	1 – 9	China

Japan	9 – 2	South Korea

China	7 – 3	Japan

Australia	6 – 20	South Korea

China	11 – 3	South Korea

Australia	2 – 21	Japan

Australia	0 – 9	China

Japan	12 – 4	South Korea

China	4 – 4	Japan

Australia	5 – 11	South Korea
