= 1991 IIHF Asian Oceanic Junior U18 Championship =

Tournament details
- Host country: China
- Dates: 3 – 9 March
- Teams: 5

Final positions
- Champions: Japan (6th title)
- Runner-up: China
- Third place: North Korea

Tournament statistics
- Games played: 10
- Scoring leader(s): (Japan) Mitsuaki Nitta

The 1991 IIHF Asian Oceanic Junior U18 Championship was the eighth edition of the IIHF Asian Oceanic Junior U18 Championship. It took place between 3 and 9 March 1991 in Jilin, China. The tournament was won by Japan, who claimed their sixth title by finishing first in the standings. China and North Korea finished second and third respectively.

== Standings ==
Pos	Team	Pld	W	D	L	GF	GA	GD	Pts
1	Japan	4	3	1	0	62	6	+56	7
2	China	4	3	1	0	49	11	+38	7
3	North Korea	4	2	0	2	18	11	+7	4
4	South Korea	4	1	0	3	31	20	+11	2
5	Mexico	4	0	0	4	3	115	−112	0

== Fixtures ==
Japan	43 – 0	Mexico

China	4 – 2	North Korea

Japan	7 – 1	North Korea

China	9 – 3	South Korea

Japan	7 – 0	South Korea

North Korea	13 – 0	Mexico

North Korea	2 – 0	South Korea

China	31 – 1	Mexico

South Korea	28 – 2	Mexico

Japan	5 – 5	China
