= 1990 IIHF Asian Oceanic Junior U18 Championship =

International ice hockey competition

Tournament details
- Host country: South Korea
- Dates: 10 – 17 February
- Teams: 4

Final positions
- Champions: Japan (5th title)
- Runners-up: China
- Third place: South Korea

Tournament statistics
- Games played: 12
- Scoring leader(s): (Japan) Osamu Kosuga

The 1990 IIHF Asian Oceanic Junior U18 Championship was the seventh edition of the IIHF Asian Oceanic Junior U18 Championship. It took place between 10 and 17 February 1990 in Seoul, South Korea. The tournament was won by Japan, who claimed their fifth title by finishing first in the standings. China and South Korea finished second and third respectively.

== Standings ==
Pos	Team	Pld	W	D	L	GF	GA	GD	Pts
1	Japan	6	6	0	0	86	4	+82	12
2	China	6	4	0	2	48	19	+29	8
3	South Korea	6	2	0	4	42	35	+7	4
4	Australia	6	0	0	6	5	123	−118	0

== Fixtures ==
South Korea	15 – 2	Australia

Japan	3 – 1	China

South Korea	3 – 5	'China

Japan	26 – 0	Australia

South Korea	0 – 10	Japan

China	17 – 0	Australia

South Korea	18 – 2	Australia

Japan	8 – 1	China

South Korea	4 – 10	China

Japan	33 – 0	Australia

South Korea	2 – 6	Japan

China	14 – 1	Australia
