= Yevgeni Pupkov =

Kazakhstani ice hockey player (1976–2021)

- Born: 18 January 1976; Ust-Kamenogorsk, Kazakh SSR, Soviet Union
- Died: 24 July 2021 (aged 45)
- Height: 6 ft 0 in (183 cm)
- Weight: 205 lb (93 kg; 14 st 9 lb)
- Position: Defence
- Shot: Left
- Played for: Torpedo Ust-Kamenogorsk; Metallurg Novokuznetsk; SKA St. Petersburg; Amur Khabarovsk; HC Lada Togliatti; Khimik Voskresensk
- National team: Kazakhstan
- Playing career: 1992–2010

Yevgeni Borisovich Pupkov (18 January 1976 – 24 July 2021) was a Kazakhstani ice hockey defenseman.

== Biography ==
Pupkov played in the Russian Superleague and Kontinental Hockey League for Torpedo Ust-Kamenogorsk, Metallurg Novokuznetsk, SKA St. Petersburg, Amur Khabarovsk, HC Lada Togliatti and Khimik Voskresensk. He was a member of the Kazakhstan men's national ice hockey team at the 2006 Winter Olympics.

Pupkov died on 24 July 2021, due to COVID-19.

== Career statistics ==
=== Regular season and playoffs ===
			Regular season					Playoffs
Season	Team	League	GP	G	A	Pts	PIM	GP	G	A	Pts	PIM
1992–93	Torpedo–2 Ust–Kamenogorsk	RUS.2	14	1	0	1	8	—	—	—	—	—
1993–94	Torpedo Ust–Kamenogorsk	IHL	1	0	0	0	0	—	—	—	—	—
1994–95	Torpedo–2 Ust–Kamenogorsk	RUS.3						—	—	—	—	—
1994–95	SK Belovo	RUS.2	23	0	0	0	16	—	—	—	—	—
1995–96	Metallurg Novokuznetsk	IHL	48	3	3	6	10	—	—	—	—	—
1996–97	Metallurg Novokuznetsk	RSL	37	1	0	1	18	—	—	—	—	—
1996–97	Metallurg–2 Novokuznetsk	RUS.3	4	1	0	1	0	—	—	—	—	—
1997–98	Metallurg Novokuznetsk	RSL	15	2	1	3	4	—	—	—	—	—
1997–98	Metallurg–2 Novokuznetsk	RUS.3	20	1	2	3	4	—	—	—	—	—
1998–99	Metallurg Novokuznetsk	RSL	41	0	6	6	24	6	0	0	0	4
1999–2000	Metallurg Novokuznetsk	RSL	38	4	2	6	74	14	0	1	1	8
2000–01	Metallurg Novokuznetsk	RSL	42	3	5	8	24	—	—	—	—	—
2000–01	Metallurg–2 Novokuznetsk	RUS.3	1	0	0	0	0	—	—	—	—	—
2001–02	Metallurg Novokuznetsk	RSL	49	2	4	6	34	—	—	—	—	—
2002–03	Metallurg Novokuznetsk	RSL	49	3	7	10	20	—	—	—	—	—
2003–04	Metallurg Novokuznetsk	RSL	49	3	7	10	20	4	0	0	0	0
2003–04	Metallurg–2 Novokuznetsk	RUS.3	2	0	2	2	6	—	—	—	—	—
2004–05	Metallurg Novokuznetsk	RSL	50	0	4	4	24	4	0	0	0	4
2004–05	Metallurg–2 Novokuznetsk	RUS.3	4	2	2	4	2	—	—	—	—	—
2005–06	SKA St. Petersburg	RSL	33	1	5	6	42	1	0	0	0	0
2005–06	SKA–2 St. Petersburg	RUS.3	6	0	0	0	8	—	—	—	—	—
2006–07	Kazzinc–Torpedo	KAZ	2	0	2	2	0	—	—	—	—	—
2006–07	Kazzinc–Torpedo	RUS.2	14	0	1	1	36	—	—	—	—	—
2006–07	Amur Khabarovsk	RSL	14	1	0	1	12	—	—	—	—	—
2007–08	Lada Togliatti	RSL	4	0	0	0	2	—	—	—	—	—
2007–08	Avtomobilist Yekaterinburg	RUS.2	30	3	6	9	42	15	4	4	8	10
2007–08	Avtomobilist–2 Yekaterinburg	RUS.3	2	3	1	4	0	—	—	—	—	—
2008–09	Khimik Voskresensk	KHL	7	1	2	3	2	—	—	—	—	—
2009–10	Ertis Pavlodar	KAZ	27	1	5	6	16	—	—	—	—	—
IHL & RSL totals			469	23	44	67	308	29	0	1	1	16

=== International ===
Year	Team	Event	GP	G	A	Pts	PIM
1993	Kazakhstan	AJC	4	1	4	5	2
1994	Kazakhstan	AJC	4	0	3	3	0
1999	Kazakhstan	WC B	7	3	0	3	4
2005	Kazakhstan	OGQ	3	0	0	0	2
2006	Kazakhstan	OG	5	0	0	0	6
2006	Kazakhstan	WC	6	1	1	2	8
Junior totals			8	1	7	8	2
Senior totals			21	4	1	5	20
