= 2012 IIHF World U18 Championship Division II =

2012 IIHF U18 World Championship Division II

Tournament details
- Host countries: Netherlands; Serbia
- Venue(s): 2 (in 2 host cities)
- Dates: 31 March – 6 April 2012; 20–26 March 2012
- Teams: 12

The 2012 IIHF U18 World Championship Division II was two international under-18 ice hockey tournaments organised by the International Ice Hockey Federation. In 2012, a new format was introduced to the IIHF World U18 Championships, therefore Division II A and Division II B now represent the fourth and the fifth tier of the IIHF World U18 Championships.

== Division II A ==
The Division II A tournament was played in Heerenveen, the Netherlands, from 31 March to 6 April 2012.

=== Participants ===
Team	Qualification
Great Britain	placed last in 2011 Division I (Group A) and were relegated
South Korea	placed last in 2011 Division I (Group B) and were relegated
Romania	placed 2nd in 2011 Division II (Group A)
Netherlands	hosts, placed 2nd in 2011 Division II (Group B)
Croatia	placed 3rd in 2011 Division II (Group A)
Lithuania	placed 3rd in 2011 Division II (Group B)

=== Final standings ===
Pos	Team	Pld	W	OTW	OTL	L	GF	GA	GD	Pts	Promotion or relegation
1	South Korea	5	3	1	1	0	17	14	+3	12	Promoted to the 2013 Division I B
2	Romania	5	4	0	0	1	25	15	+10	12	
3	Lithuania	5	3	1	0	1	22	11	+11	11	
4	Great Britain	5	1	1	0	3	18	17	+1	5	
5	Croatia	5	1	0	1	3	8	23	−15	4	
6	Netherlands	5	0	0	1	4	16	26	−10	1	Relegated to the 2013 Division II B

Source: IIHF

=== Results ===
All times are local. (Central European Summer Time – UTC+2)

31 March 2012; 13:30	Croatia	3–6 (1–1, 1–0, 1–5)	Romania	Thialf IJsstadion, Heerenveen

Game reference

31 March 2012; 17:00	Lithuania	7–3 (2–2, 2–0, 3–1)	Great Britain	Thialf IJsstadion, Heerenveen

Game reference

31 March 2012; 20:30	Netherlands	3–4 (2–4, 1–0, 0–0)	South Korea	Thialf IJsstadion, Heerenveen

Game reference

1 April 2012; 13:30	Romania	3–1 (2–0, 0–0, 1–1)	Lithuania	Thialf IJsstadion, Heerenveen

Game reference

1 April 2012; 17:00	Great Britain	4–3 OT (1–2, 1–1, 1–0) (1–0)	Netherlands	Thialf IJsstadion, Heerenveen

Game reference

1 April 2012; 20:30	South Korea	3–2 GWS (0–1, 0–0, 2–1) (0–0, 1–0)	Croatia	Thialf IJsstadion, Heerenveen

Game reference

3 April 2012; 13:30	South Korea	2–3 GWS (0–1, 1–1, 1–0) (0–0, 0–1)	Lithuania	Thialf IJsstadion, Heerenveen

Game reference

3 April 2012; 17:00	Romania	3–2 (1–0, 2–1, 0–1)	Great Britain	Thialf IJsstadion, Heerenveen

Game reference

3 April 2012; 20:30	Netherlands	2–3 (1–2, 0–1, 1–0)	Croatia	Thialf IJsstadion, Heerenveen

Game reference

4 April 2012; 13:30	South Korea	4–3 (1–0, 2–1, 1–2)	Romania	Thialf IJsstadion, Heerenveen

Game reference

4 April 2012; 17:00	Great Britain	6–0 (2–0, 2–0, 2–0)	Croatia	Thialf IJsstadion, Heerenveen

Game reference

4 April 2012; 20:30	Lithuania	5–3 (1–0, 1–3, 3–0)	Netherlands	Thialf IJsstadion, Heerenveen

Game reference

6 April 2012; 13:30	Croatia	0–6 (0–3, 0–1, 0–2)	Lithuania	Thialf IJsstadion, Heerenveen

Game reference

6 April 2012; 17:00	Great Britain	3–4 (0–3, 1–1, 2–0)	South Korea	Thialf IJsstadion, Heerenveen

Game reference

6 April 2012; 20:30	Romania	10–5 (3–0, 3–2, 4–3)	Netherlands	Thialf IJsstadion, Heerenveen

Game reference

== Division II B ==
The Division II B tournament was played in Novi Sad, Serbia, from 20 to 26 March 2012.

=== Participants ===
Team	Qualification
Estonia	placed 4th in 2011 Division II (Group A)
Spain	placed 4th in 2011 Division II (Group B)
Serbia	hosts, placed 5th in 2011 Division II (Group A)
China	placed 5th in 2011 Division II (Group B)
Australia	placed 1st in 2011 Division III (Group A) and were promoted
Iceland	placed 1st in 2011 Division III (Group B) and were promoted

=== Final standings ===
Pos	Team	Pld	W	OTW	OTL	L	GF	GA	GD	Pts	Promotion or relegation
1	Estonia	5	4	1	0	0	32	17	+15	14	Promoted to the 2013 Division II A
2	Serbia	5	3	0	0	2	22	16	+6	9	
3	Spain	5	2	1	0	2	21	18	+3	8	
4	Iceland	5	2	0	1	2	23	23	0	7	
5	Australia	5	1	0	1	3	8	20	−12	4	
6	China	5	0	1	1	3	18	30	−12	3	Relegated to the 2013 Division III A

Source: IIHF

=== Results ===
All times are local. (Central European Time – UTC+1, 26 March 2012: Central European Summer Time – UTC+2)

20 March 2012; 13:00	Estonia	7–4 (0–1, 2–1, 5–2)	Australia	SPENS, Novi Sad

Game reference

20 March 2012; 16:30	China	4–9 (0–3, 1–1, 3–5)	Spain	SPENS, Novi Sad

Game reference

20 March 2012; 20:30	Iceland	4–5 (1–0, 1–1, 2–4)	Serbia	SPENS, Novi Sad

Game reference

21 March 2012; 13:00	Estonia	7–6 OT (3–1, 1–2, 2–3) (1–0)	China	SPENS, Novi Sad

Game reference

21 March 2012; 16:30	Australia	0–5 (0–0, 0–4, 0–1)	Iceland	SPENS, Novi Sad

Game reference

21 March 2012; 20:00	Spain	4–3 (1–0, 2–0, 1–3)	Serbia	SPENS, Novi Sad

Game reference

23 March 2012; 13:00	Spain	2–1 OT (0–0, 0–0, 1–1) (1–0)	Australia	SPENS, Novi Sad

Game reference

23 March 2012; 16:30	Estonia	7–3 (2–0, 4–2, 1–1)	Iceland	SPENS, Novi Sad

Game reference

23 March 2012; 20:00	China	1–6 (0–2, 1–3, 0–1)	Serbia	SPENS, Novi Sad

Game reference

24 March 2012; 13:00	Iceland	5–4 (1–1, 3–2, 1–1)	Spain	SPENS, Novi Sad

Game reference

24 March 2012; 16:30	Australia	2–0 (0–0, 1–0, 1–0)	China	SPENS, Novi Sad

Game reference

24 March 2012; 20:00	Serbia	2–6 (1–1, 0–4, 1–1)	Estonia	SPENS, Novi Sad

Game reference

26 March 2012; 13:00	China	7–6 OT (1–2, 2–2, 3–2) (1–0)	Iceland	SPENS, Novi Sad

Game reference

26 March 2012; 16:30	Spain	2–5 (1–0, 0–0, 1–5)	Estonia	SPENS, Novi Sad

Game reference

26 March 2012; 20:00	Serbia	6–1 (2–0, 2–0, 2–1)	Australia	SPENS, Novi Sad

Game reference
