= 1996 IIHF Asian Oceanic Junior U18 Championship =

Tournament details
- Host country: Kazakhstan
- Dates: 19 – 22 March
- Teams: 4

Final positions
- Champions: Kazakhstan (3rd title)
- Runner-up: South Korea
- Third place: Japan

Tournament statistics
- Games played: 6
- Scoring leader(s): (Kazakhstan) Anton Komissarov

The 1996 IIHF Asian Oceanic Junior U18 Championship was the 13th edition of the IIHF Asian Oceanic Junior U18 Championship. It took place between 19 and 22 March 1996 in Ust-Kamenogorsk, Kazakhstan. The tournament was won by Kazakhstan, who claimed their third title by finishing first in the standings. South Korea and Japan finished second and third respectively.

== Standings ==
Pos	Team	Pld	W	D	L	GF	GA	GD	Pts
1	Kazakhstan	3	3	0	0	32	8	+24	6
2	South Korea	3	2	0	1	13	14	−1	4
3	Japan	3	1	0	2	11	13	−2	2
4	China	3	0	0	3	4	25	−21	0

== Fixtures ==
Japan	5 – 1	China

Kazakhstan	9 – 4	South Korea

Japan	2 – 4	South Korea

Kazakhstan	15 – 0	China

China	3 – 5	South Korea

Kazakhstan	8 – 4	Japan
