= 1995 IIHF Asian Oceanic Junior U18 Championship =

Tournament details
- Host country: Japan
- Dates: 20 – 23 March
- Teams: 4

Final positions
- Champions: Japan (8th title)
- Runner-up: Kazakhstan
- Third place: China

Tournament statistics
- Games played: 6
- Scoring leader(s): (South Korea) Lee Ho-Jung

The 1995 IIHF Asian Oceanic Junior U18 Championship was the 12th edition of the IIHF Asian Oceanic Junior U18 Championship. It took place between 20 and 23 March 1995 in Obihiro, Japan. The tournament was won by Japan, who claimed their eighth title by finishing first in the standings. Kazakhstan and China finished second and third respectively.

== Standings ==
Pos	Team	Pld	W	D	L	GF	GA	GD	Pts
1	Japan	3	2	0	1	14	7	+7	4
2	Kazakhstan	3	2	0	1	15	10	+5	4
3	China	3	1	0	2	6	16	−10	2
4	South Korea	3	1	0	2	12	14	−2	2

== Fixtures ==
Japan	7 – 0	China

South Korea	4 – 7	Kazakhstan

China	5 – 3	South Korea

Japan	5 – 2	Kazakhstan

Kazakhstan	6 – 1	China

Japan	2 – 5	South Korea
