= 1985 IIHF Asian Oceanic Junior U18 Championship =

International ice hockey competition

Tournament details
- Host country: South Korea
- Dates: 28 January – 2 February
- Teams: 3

Final positions
- Champions: Japan (2nd title)
- Runners-up: South Korea
- Third place: Australia

Tournament statistics
- Games played: 6
- Scoring leader(s): (Japan) Hidesato Takahashi

The 1985 IIHF Asian Oceanic Junior U18 Championship was the second edition of the IIHF Asian Oceanic Junior U18 Championship. It took place between 28 January and 2 February 1985 in Seoul, South Korea. The tournament was won by Japan, who claimed their second title by finishing first in the standings. South Korea and Australia finished second and third respectively.

== Standings ==
Pos	Team	Pld	W	D	L	GF	GA	GD	Pts
1	Japan	4	4	0	0	34	8	+26	8
2	South Korea	4	1	1	2	23	23	0	3
3	Australia	4	0	1	3	6	32	−26	1

== Fixtures ==
South Korea	4 – 4	Australia

Australia	0 – 6	Japan

South Korea	2 – 4	Japan

South Korea	11 – 2	Australia

Japan	11 – 0	Australia

South Korea	6 – 13	Japan
