= 1989 IIHF Asian Oceanic Junior U18 Championship =

International ice hockey competition

Tournament details
- Host country: Japan
- Dates: 13 – 18 February
- Teams: 3

Final positions
- Champions: Japan (4th title)
- Runners-up: South Korea
- Third place: China

Tournament statistics
- Games played: 6
- Scoring leader(s): (Japan) Tomoki Kobayashi

The 1989 IIHF Asian Oceanic Junior U18 Championship was the sixth edition of the IIHF Asian Oceanic Junior U18 Championship. It took place between 13 and 18 February 1989 in Hachinohe, Japan. The tournament was won by Japan, who claimed their fourth title by finishing first in the standings. South Korea and China finished second and third respectively.

== Standings ==
| Pos | Team | Pld | W | D | L | GF | GA | GD | Pts |
|---|---|---|---|---|---|---|---|---|---|
| 1 | Japan | 4 | 3 | 1 | 0 | 32 | 14 | +18 | 7 |
| 2 | South Korea | 4 | 2 | 0 | 2 | 19 | 26 | −7 | 4 |
| 3 | China | 4 | 0 | 1 | 3 | 16 | 27 | −11 | 1 |

== Fixtures ==
| China | 3 – 8 | South Korea |

| Japan | 8 – 2 | South Korea |

| Japan | 5 – 5 | China |

| South Korea | 7 – 3 | China |

| Japan | 12 – 2 | South Korea |

| Japan | 7 – 5 | China |
