= 2018 IIHF World U18 Championship Division II =

2018 IIHF U18 World Championship Division II
Tournament details
- Host countries: Estonia; Croatia
- Dates: 1–7 April 2018; 24–30 March 2018
- Teams: 12

The 2018 IIHF U18 World Championship Division II was two international under-18 ice hockey tournaments organised by the International Ice Hockey Federation. The Division II A and Division II B tournaments represent the fourth and the fifth tier of the IIHF World U18 Championship.

== Division II A ==
2018 IIHF World U18 Championship Division II A

Tournament details
- Host country: Estonia
- Venue(s): 1 (in 1 host city)
- Dates: 1–7 April
- Teams: 6

Tournament statistics
- Games played: 15
- Goals scored: 113 (7.53 per game)
- Attendance: 5,655 (377 per game)
- Scoring leader(s): (Poland) Damian Tyczyński (12 points)

The Division II A tournament was played in Tallinn, Estonia, from 1 to 7 April 2018.

=== Participants ===
Team	Qualification
Poland	placed 6th in 2017 Division I B and were relegated
Estonia	hosts; placed 2nd in 2017 Division II A
Lithuania	placed 3rd in 2017 Division II A
South Korea	placed 4th in 2017 Division II A
Great Britain	placed 5th in 2017 Division II A
Australia	placed 1st in 2017 Division II B and were promoted

=== Final standings ===
Pos	Team	Pld	W	OTW	OTL	L	GF	GA	GD	Pts	Promotion or relegation
1	Great Britain	5	4	0	0	1	26	15	+11	12 (Note: Great Britain 3−2 Lithuania)	Promoted to the 2019 Division I B
2	Lithuania	5	4	0	0	1	22	8	+14	12	
3	Poland	5	3	1	0	1	32	11	+21	11	
4	South Korea	5	2	0	0	3	12	14	−2	6	
5	Estonia (H)	5	1	0	1	3	17	21	−4	4	
6	Australia	5	0	0	0	5	4	44	−40	0	Relegated to the 2019 Division II B

Source: IIHF
Rules for classification: 1) points; 2) head-to-head points; 3) head-to-head goal difference; 4) head-to-head number of goals scored; 5) result against closest best-ranked team outside tied teams; 6) result against second-best ranked team outside tied teams; 7) seeding before tournament.
(H) Host

=== Results ===
All times are local. (Eastern European Summer Time – UTC+3)

1 April 2018; 13:00	Australia	1–4 (1–1, 0–2, 0–1)	South Korea	Tondiraba Ice Hall, Tallinn

Game reference

1 April 2018; 16:30	Lithuania	4–3 (1–1, 1–0, 2–2)	Poland	Tondiraba Ice Hall, Tallinn

Game reference

1 April 2018; 20:00	Estonia	3–6 (0–4, 3–2, 0–0)	Great Britain	Tondiraba Ice Hall, Tallinn

Game reference

2 April 2018; 13:00	Poland	4–0 (1–0, 1–0, 2–0)	South Korea	Tondiraba Ice Hall, Tallinn

Game reference

2 April 2018; 16:30	Great Britain	9–2 (2–1, 5–1, 2–0)	Australia	Tondiraba Ice Hall, Tallinn

Game reference

2 April 2018; 20:00	Estonia	0–7 (0–2, 0–2, 0–3)	Lithuania	Tondiraba Ice Hall, Tallinn

Game reference

4 April 2018; 13:00	Poland	5–4 (3–2, 0–2, 2–0)	Great Britain	Tondiraba Ice Hall, Tallinn

Game reference

4 April 2018; 16:30	Lithuania	2–1 (0–0, 1–1, 1–0)	South Korea	Tondiraba Ice Hall, Tallinn

Game reference

4 April 2018; 20:00	Estonia	8–0 (3–0, 0–0, 5–0)	Australia	Tondiraba Ice Hall, Tallinn

Game reference

6 April 2018; 13:00	Great Britain	3–2 (1–0, 2–2, 0–0)	Lithuania	Tondiraba Ice Hall, Tallinn

Game reference

6 April 2018; 16:30	Australia	0–16 (0–7, 0–5, 0–4)	Poland	Tondiraba Ice Hall, Tallinn

Game reference

6 April 2018; 20:00	South Korea	4–3 (3–1, 0–1, 1–1)	Estonia	Tondiraba Ice Hall, Tallinn

Game reference

7 April 2018; 13:00	Lithuania	7–1 (3–1, 1–0, 3–0)	Australia	Tondiraba Ice Hall, Tallinn

Game reference

7 April 2018; 16:30	South Korea	3–4 (0–2, 3–1, 0–1)	Great Britain	Tondiraba Ice Hall, Tallinn

Game reference

7 April 2018; 20:00	Poland	4–3 OT (1–0, 2–2, 0–1); OT: (1–0)	Estonia	Tondiraba Ice Hall, Tallinn

Game reference

=== Awards ===
Best Players Selected by the Directorate

- Goaltender: (Poland) Sebastian Lipiński
- Defenceman: (Lithuania) Dominykas Motiejūnas
- Forward: (United Kingdom) Mason Alderson

Source: IIHF

== Division II B ==
2018 IIHF World U18 Championship Division II B

Tournament details
- Host country: Croatia
- Venue(s): 1 (in 1 host city)
- Dates: 24–30 March
- Teams: 6

Tournament statistics
- Games played: 15
- Goals scored: 99 (6.6 per game)
- Attendance: 6,816 (454 per game)
- Scoring leader(s): (Spain) Pablo Zaballa (10 points)

The Division II B tournament was played in Zagreb, Croatia, from 24 to 30 March 2018.

=== Participants ===
Team	Qualification
Croatia	hosts; placed 6th in 2017 Division II A and were relegated
Spain	placed 2nd in 2017 Division II B
Serbia	placed 3rd in 2017 Division II B
Netherlands	placed 4th in 2017 Division II B
Iceland	placed 5th in 2017 Division II B
China	placed 1st in 2017 Division III A and were promoted

=== Final standings ===
Pos	Team	Pld	W	OTW	OTL	L	GF	GA	GD	Pts	Promotion or relegation
1	Spain	5	4	1	0	0	27	13	+14	14	Promoted to the 2019 Division II A
2	Croatia (H)	5	2	1	0	2	13	12	+1	8 (Note: Serbia 1–2 Croatia)	
3	Serbia	5	2	0	2	1	16	11	+5	8	
4	Netherlands	5	1	2	0	2	18	18	0	7 (Note: China 5–6 (GWS) Netherlands)	
5	China	5	2	0	1	2	16	19	−3	7	
6	Iceland	5	0	0	1	4	9	26	−17	1	Relegated to the 2019 Division III A

Source: IIHF
Rules for classification: 1) points; 2) head-to-head points; 3) head-to-head goal difference; 4) head-to-head number of goals scored; 5) result against closest best-ranked team outside tied teams; 6) result against second-best ranked team outside tied teams; 7) seeding before tournament.
(H) Host

=== Results ===
All times are local. (24 March: Central European Time – UTC+1, from 25 March: Central European Summer Time – UTC+2)

24 March 2018; 13:00	Spain	8–3 (6–0, 1–2, 1–1)	Iceland	Dom Sportova, Zagreb

Game reference

24 March 2018; 16:30	China	5–6 GWS (1–2, 3–1, 1–2); OT: (0–0); SO: (0–1)	Netherlands	Dom Sportova, Zagreb

Game reference

24 March 2018; 20:00	Serbia	1–2 (0–0, 0–1, 1–1)	Croatia	Dom Sportova, Zagreb

Game reference

25 March 2018; 13:00	Iceland	0–5 (0–2, 0–1, 0–2)	China	Dom Sportova, Zagreb

Game reference

25 March 2018; 16:30	Spain	3–2 GWS (1–1, 0–1, 1–0); OT: (0–0); SO: (1–0)	Serbia	Dom Sportova, Zagreb

Game reference

25 March 2018; 20:00	Croatia	3–0 (1–0, 0–0, 2–0)	Netherlands	Dom Sportova, Zagreb

Game reference

27 March 2018; 13:00	Serbia	4–5 OT (1–2, 2–1, 1–1); OT: (0–1)	Netherlands	Dom Sportova, Zagreb

Game reference

27 March 2018; 16:30	Spain	7–3 (2–0, 2–1, 3–2)	China	Dom Sportova, Zagreb

Game reference

27 March 2018; 20:00	Croatia	5–4 GWS (1–2, 2–0, 1–2); OT: (0–0); SO: (1–0)	Iceland	Dom Sportova, Zagreb

Game reference

28 March 2018; 13:00	Netherlands	4–5 (0–2, 2–1, 2–2)	Spain	Dom Sportova, Zagreb

Game reference

28 March 2018; 16:30	Iceland	1–5 (0–3, 1–2, 0–0)	Serbia	Dom Sportova, Zagreb

Game reference

28 March 2018; 20:00	China	3–2 (0–2, 1–0, 2–0)	Croatia	Dom Sportova, Zagreb

Game reference

30 March 2018; 13:00	Serbia	4–0 (1–0, 2–0, 1–0)	China	Dom Sportova, Zagreb

Game reference

30 March 2018; 16:30	Netherlands	3–1 (1–0, 0–0, 2–1)	Iceland	Dom Sportova, Zagreb

Game reference

30 March 2018; 20:00	Croatia	1–4 (0–1, 0–2, 1–1)	Spain	Dom Sportova, Zagreb

Game reference

=== Awards ===
Best Players Selected by the Directorate

- Goaltender: (Croatia) Domagoj Troha
- Defenceman: (Spain) Aron Sarmiento
- Forward: (China) Wang Jing

Source: IIHF
