= 1998 IIHF Asian Oceanic Junior U18 Championship =

Tournament details
- Host country: China
- Dates: 15 – 21 March
- Teams: 6

Final positions
- Champions: South Korea (1st title)
- Runner-up: Japan
- Third place: China
- Fourth place: Australia

Tournament statistics
- Games played: 15
- Goals scored: 406 (27.07 per game)
- Scoring leader(s): (South Korea) Song Dong-hwan

The 1998 IIHF Asian Oceanic Junior U18 Championship was the 15th edition of the IIHF Asian Oceanic Junior U18 Championship. It took place between 15 and 21 March 1998 in Harbin, China. The tournament was won by South Korea, who claimed their first title by finishing first in the standings. Japan and China finished second and third respectively.

== Overview ==
The 1998 IIHF Asian Oceanic Junior U18 Championship began on 15 March 1998 in Harbin, China. The under-18 teams of New Zealand and Thailand made their debut appearance at the Championships and in international competition. South Korea won the tournament after winning four of their five games and drawing their game against Japan. South Korea won their first title having previously finished second on four other occasions. Japan finished second behind South Korea on goal difference and China finished third after losing to South Korea and Japan. Thailand who finished last also suffered the largest defeat of the tournament against South Korea, losing 0 – 92.

Song Dong-hwan of South Korea finished as the top scorer for the tournament with 56 points including 44 goals and 12 assists.

== Standings ==
Pos	Team	Pld	W	D	L	GF	GA	GD	Pts
1	South Korea	5	4	1	0	148	4	+144	9
2	Japan	5	4	1	0	130	3	+127	9
3	China	5	3	0	2	69	12	+57	6
4	Australia	5	2	0	3	42	60	−18	4
5	New Zealand	5	1	0	4	14	110	−96	2
6	Thailand	5	0	0	5	3	217	−214	0

== Fixtures ==
New Zealand	0 – 26	China	Harbin

Australia	0 – 25	Japan	Harbin

South Korea	92 – 0	Thailand	Harbin

Japan	38 – 0	New Zealand	Harbin

South Korea	22 – 1	Australia	Harbin

China	31 – 0	Thailand	Harbin

South Korea	28 – 0	New Zealand	Harbin

Japan	7 – 1	China	Harbin

Thailand	1 – 24	Australia	Harbin

China	1 – 4	South Korea	Harbin

Australia	16 – 2	New Zealand	Harbin

Japan	58 – 0	Thailand	Harbin

New Zealand	12 – 2	Thailand	Harbin

China	10 – 1	Australia	Harbin

South Korea	2 – 2	Japan	Harbin
