= 2008 IIHF World U18 Championship Division II =

Tournament details
- Host countries: France; Estonia
- Venue(s): 3 (in 3 host cities)
- Dates: 30 March – 5 April 2008; 23–29 March 2008
- Teams: 12

The 2008 IIHF World U18 Championship Division II was an international under-18 ice hockey competition organised by the International Ice Hockey Federation. Both Division II tournaments made up the third level of competition of the 2008 IIHF World U18 Championships. The Group A tournament took place between 30 March and 5 April 2008 in Méribel and Courchevel, France and the Group B tournament was played from 23 to 29 March 2008 in Tallinn, Estonia. France and Hungary won the Group A and B tournaments respectively and gained promotion to the Division I of the 2009 IIHF World U18 Championships.

== Group A ==
The Group A tournament was played in Méribel and Courchevel, France, from 30 March to 5 April 2008.

=== Final standings ===
Pos	Team	Pld	W	OTW	OTL	L	GF	GA	GD	Pts	Promotion or relegation
1	France	5	5	0	0	0	53	4	+49	15	Promoted to the 2009 Division I
2	South Korea	5	3	1	0	1	31	9	+22	11	
3	Croatia	5	3	0	0	2	32	24	+8	9	
4	Belgium	5	2	0	1	2	14	30	−16	7	
5	China	5	1	0	0	4	14	52	−38	3	
6	Australia	5	0	0	0	5	8	33	−25	0	Relegated to the 2009 Division III

Source: IIHF

=== Results ===
All times are local.

30 March 2008; 15:00	South Korea	10–0 (2–0, 3–0, 5–0)	Australia	Arena Courchevel

Game reference

30 March 2008; 20:30	China	4–5 (1–2, 3–2, 0–1)	Belgium	Arena Courchevel

Game reference

30 March 2008; 20:30	Croatia	1–8 (0–2, 1–3, 0–3)	France	Arena Méribel

Game reference

31 March 2008; 15:00	South Korea	6–3 (3–1, 1–1, 2–1)	Croatia	Arena Méribel

Game reference

31 March 2008; 20:30	Australia	4–5 (0–2, 0–1, 4–2)	China	Arena Méribel

Game reference

31 March 2008; 20:30	France	16–0 (5–0, 6–0, 5–0)	Belgium	Arena Courchevel

Game reference

2 April 2008; 15:00	Croatia	5–4 (0–1, 4–1, 1–2)	Belgium	Arena Courchevel

Game reference

2 April 2008; 20:30	South Korea	10–0 (5–0, 4–0, 1–0)	China	Arena Méribel

Game reference

2 April 2008; 20:30	France	10–2 (2–1, 4–1, 4–0)	Australia	Arena Courchevel

Game reference

4 April 2008; 15:00	Belgium	3–4 OT (2–2, 1–0, 0–1, 0–1)	South Korea	Arena Méribel

Game reference

4 April 2008; 20:30	Australia	1–6 (0–3, 1–2, 0–1)	Croatia	Arena Courchevel

Game reference

4 April 2008; 20:30	China	0–16 (0–4, 0–5, 0–7)	France	Arena Méribel

Game reference

5 April 2008; 15:00	Belgium	2–1 (0–1, 1–0, 1–0)	Australia	Arena Courchevel

Game reference

5 April 2008; 18:00	Croatia	17–5 (3–1, 6–2, 8–2)	China	Arena Méribel

Game reference

5 April 2008; 20:30	France	3–1 (1–1, 2–0, 0–0)	South Korea	Arena Courchevel

Game reference

== Group B ==
The Group B tournament was played in Tallinn, Estonia, from 23 to 29 March 2008.

=== Final standings ===
Pos	Team	Pld	W	OTW	OTL	L	GF	GA	GD	Pts	Promotion or relegation
1	Hungary	5	4	0	0	1	37	12	+25	12	Promoted to the 2009 Division I
2	Great Britain	5	4	0	0	1	27	11	+16	12	
3	Estonia	5	3	0	0	2	20	14	+6	9	
4	Romania	5	2	0	0	3	32	21	+11	6	
5	Spain	5	2	0	0	3	20	21	−1	6	
6	Israel	5	0	0	0	5	11	68	−57	0	Relegated to the 2009 Division III

Source: IIHF

=== Results ===
All times are local.

23 March 2008; 13:00	Spain	1–8 (1–2, 0–3, 0–3)	Romania	Arena Premia, Tallinn

Game reference

23 March 2008; 16:30	Estonia	3–5 (0–0, 3–4, 0–1)	Great Britain	Arena Premia, Tallinn

Game reference

23 March 2008; 20:00	Hungary	19–1 (5–0, 7–1, 7–0)	Israel	Arena Premia, Tallinn

Game reference

24 March 2008; 13:00	Great Britain	5–3 (0–3, 3–0, 2–0)	Romania	Arena Premia, Tallinn

Game reference

24 March 2008; 16:30	Israel	4–12 (1–4, 3–2, 0–6)	Spain	Arena Premia, Tallinn

Game reference

24 March 2008; 20:00	Hungary	3–2 (1–0, 1–1, 1–1)	Estonia	Arena Premia, Tallinn

Game reference

26 March 2008; 13:00	Great Britain	12–0 (4–0, 4–0, 4–0)	Israel	Arena Premia, Tallinn

Game reference

26 March 2008; 16:30	Hungary	3–4 (2–2, 0–1, 1–1)	Spain	Arena Premia, Tallinn

Game reference

26 March 2008; 20:00	Estonia	3–2 (2–0, 1–1, 0–1)	Romania	Arena Premia, Tallinn

Game reference

27 March 2008; 13:00	Spain	2–4 (2–0, 0–3, 0–1)	Great Britain	Arena Premia, Tallinn

Game reference

27 March 2008; 16:30	Romania	4–9 (0–4, 2–2, 2–3)	Hungary	Arena Premia, Tallinn

Game reference

27 March 2008; 20:00	Israel	3–10 (0–5, 1–3, 2–2)	Estonia	Arena Premia, Tallinn

Game reference

29 March 2008; 13:00	Romania	15–3 (5–0, 4–2, 6–1)	Israel	Arena Premia, Tallinn

Game reference

29 March 2008; 16:30	Great Britain	1–3 (1–1, 0–1, 0–1)	Hungary	Arena Premia, Tallinn

Game reference

29 March 2008; 20:00	Estonia	2–1 (0–1, 0–0, 2–0)	Spain	Arena Premia, Tallinn

Game reference
