= 1993 IIHF Asian Oceanic Junior U18 Championship =

Tournament details
- Host country: South Korea
- Dates: 6 – 12 March
- Teams: 5

Final positions
- Champions: Kazakhstan (1st title)
- Runner-up: Japan
- Third place: South Korea

Tournament statistics
- Games played: 10
- Scoring leader(s): (Kazakhstan) Anatoli Filatov

The 1993 IIHF Asian Oceanic Junior U18 Championship was the 10th edition of the IIHF Asian Oceanic Junior U18 Championship. It took place between 6 and 12 March 1993 in Seoul, South Korea. The tournament was won by Kazakhstan, who claimed their first title by finishing first in the standings. Japan and South Korea finished second and third respectively.

== Standings ==
Pos	Team	Pld	W	D	L	GF	GA	GD	Pts
1	Kazakhstan	4	4	0	0	88	0	+88	8
2	Japan	4	3	0	1	65	9	+56	6
3	South Korea	4	2	0	2	31	24	+7	4
4	China	4	1	0	3	26	27	−1	2
5	Australia	4	0	0	4	1	151	−150	0

== Fixtures ==
South Korea	26 – 1	Australia

China	0 – 13	Kazakhstan

South Korea	0 – 11	Kazakhstan

Japan	43 – 0	Australia

Japan	11 – 0	China

Australia	0 – 57	Kazakhstan

South Korea	3 – 1	China

Japan	0 – 7	Kazakhstan

South Korea	2 – 11	Japan

China	25 – 0	Australia
