= 2023 IIHF World U18 Championship Division I =

2023 IIHF U18 World Championship Division I
Tournament details
- Host countries: France; Slovenia
- Venue(s): 2 (in 2 host cities)
- Dates: 23–29 April (Group A); 10–16 April (Group B)
- Teams: 12

The 2023 IIHF U18 World Championship Division I was two international under-18 ice hockey tournaments organised by the International Ice Hockey Federation. The Division I A and Division I B tournaments represent the second and the third tier of the IIHF World U18 Championship.

In the 'A' tournament Kazakhstan clinched the championship (and promotion) on the final day with a victory over the hosts France, while France finished last and were relegated. In the 'B' tournament Austria clinched the championship (and promotion) on the final day with a victory over South Korea before the hosts game against Italy. Their only loss was Poland's only win despite high hopes of an improved roster with a new coach, but were relegated.

== Division I A ==
2023 IIHF U18 World Championship Division I A

Tournament details
- Host country: France
- Venue(s): 1 (in 1 host city)
- Dates: 23–29 April
- Teams: 6

Tournament statistics
- Games played: 15
- Goals scored: 84 (5.6 per game)
- Attendance: 8,278 (552 per game)
- Scoring leader(s): (Denmark) Oscar Mølgaard (12 points)

Official website
- www.iihf.com

The Division I A tournament was played in Angers, France, from 23 to 29 April 2023.

=== Participants ===
Team	Qualification
France	Hosts, placed 3rd in 2022 Division I A
Kazakhstan	Placed 4th in 2022 Division I A
Denmark	Placed 5th in 2022 Division I A
Japan	Placed 6th in 2022 Division I A
Hungary	Placed 1st in 2022 Division I B and were promoted
Ukraine	Placed 2nd in 2022 Division I B and were promoted

=== Standings ===
Pos	Team	Pld	W	OTW	OTL	L	GF	GA	GD	Pts	Promotion or relegation
1	Kazakhstan	5	4	0	0	1	22	9	+13	12	Promoted to the 2024 Top Division
2	Denmark	5	3	1	0	1	26	11	+15	11	
3	Japan	5	2	1	0	2	13	15	−2	8	
4	Hungary	5	2	0	1	2	8	15	−7	7	
5	Ukraine	5	0	2	1	2	8	16	−8	5	
6	France (H)	5	0	0	2	3	7	18	−11	2	Relegated to the 2024 Division I B

Source: IIHF
Rules for classification: 1) points; 2) head-to-head points; 3) head-to-head goal difference; 4) head-to-head number of goals scored; 5) result against closest best-ranked team outside tied teams; 6) result against second-best ranked team outside tied teams; 7) seeding before tournament.
(H) Host

=== Results ===
All times are local (UTC+2).

23 April 2023; 12:30	Japan	5–3 (0–1, 3–0, 2–2)	Denmark	Angers IceParc, Angers; Attendance: 352

Game reference
8 min	Penalties	8 min
21	Shots	25

23 April 2023; 16:00	Ukraine	3–2 GWS (1–1, 1–1, 0–0); OT: (0–0); SO: (1–0)	France	Angers IceParc, Angers; Attendance: 1,317

Game reference
12 min	Penalties	2 min
32	Shots	32

23 April 2023; 19:30	Hungary	0–3 (0–0, 0–3, 0–0)	Kazakhstan	Angers IceParc, Angers; Attendance: 134

Game reference
14 min	Penalties	14 min
19	Shots	33

24 April 2023; 12:30	Denmark	5–1 (2–1, 2–0, 1–0)	Ukraine	Angers IceParc, Angers; Attendance: 238

Game reference
10 min	Penalties	8 min
38	Shots	28

24 April 2023; 16:00	Kazakhstan	5–0 (1–0, 1–0, 3–0)	Japan	Angers IceParc, Angers; Attendance: 148

Game reference
6 min	Penalties	4 min
24	Shots	28

24 April 2023; 19:30	France	0–2 (0–0, 0–1, 0–1)	Hungary	Angers IceParc, Angers; Attendance: 911

Game reference
2 min	Penalties	6 min
23	Shots	47

26 April 2023; 12:30	Kazakhstan	3–8 (1–3, 2–3, 0–2)	Denmark	Angers IceParc, Angers; Attendance: 228

Game reference
8 min	Penalties	10 min
31	Shots	35

26 April 2023; 16:00	Ukraine	3–2 GWS (0–1, 1–1, 1–0); OT: (0–0); SO: (1–0)	Hungary	Angers IceParc, Angers; Attendance: 166

Game reference
16 min	Penalties	10 min
28	Shots	34

26 April 2023; 19:30	France	2–4 (0–1, 0–2, 2–1)	Japan	Angers IceParc, Angers; Attendance: 1,315

Game reference
10 min	Penalties	8 min
30	Shots	34

27 April 2023; 12:30	Kazakhstan	5–0 (1–0, 4–0, 0–0)	Ukraine	Angers IceParc, Angers; Attendance: 244

Game reference
6 min	Penalties	18 min
41	Shots	21

27 April 2023; 16:00	Hungary	4–2 (1–1, 1–0, 2–1)	Japan	Angers IceParc, Angers; Attendance: 188

Game reference
6 min	Penalties	2 min
27	Shots	31

27 April 2023; 19:30	Denmark	3–2 OT (2–1, 0–1, 0–0); OT: (1–0)	France	Angers IceParc, Angers; Attendance: 1,400

Game reference
10 min	Penalties	29 min
41	Shots	23

29 April 2023; 12:30	Japan	2–1 OT (0–0, 1–1, 0–0); OT: (1–0)	Ukraine	Angers IceParc, Angers; Attendance: 276

Game reference
4 min	Penalties	6 min
23	Shots	31

29 April 2023; 16:00	Denmark	7–0 (3–0, 2–0, 2–0)	Hungary	Angers IceParc, Angers; Attendance: 204

Game reference
6 min	Penalties	60 min
28	Shots	29

29 April 2023; 19:30	France	1–6 (1–3, 0–1, 0–2)	Kazakhstan	Angers IceParc, Angers; Attendance: 1,157

Game reference
6 min	Penalties	6 min
22	Shots	35

== Division I B ==
2023 IIHF U18 World Championship Division I B

Tournament details
- Host country: Slovenia
- Venue(s): 1 (in 1 host city)
- Dates: 10–16 April
- Teams: 6

Tournament statistics
- Games played: 15
- Goals scored: 84 (5.6 per game)
- Attendance: 3,427 (228 per game)
- Scoring leader(s): (Slovenia) Filip Sitar (11 points)

Official website
- www.iihf.com

The Division I B tournament was played in Bled, Slovenia, from 10 to 16 April 2023.

=== Participants ===
Team	Qualification
Italy	Placed 3rd in 2022 Division I B
Slovenia	Hosts, placed 4th in 2022 Division I B
Austria	Placed 5th in 2022 Division I B
Poland	Placed 6th in 2022 Division I B
South Korea	Placed 1st in 2022 Division II A and were promoted
Estonia	Placed 2nd in 2022 Division II A and were promoted

=== Standings ===
Pos	Team	Pld	W	OTW	OTL	L	GF	GA	GD	Pts	Promotion or relegation
1	Austria	5	4	0	0	1	21	10	+11	12	Promoted to the 2024 Division I A
2	Slovenia (H)	5	3	1	0	1	20	13	+7	11	
3	Italy	5	3	0	1	1	9	9	0	10	
4	South Korea	5	2	0	0	3	17	15	+2	6	
5	Estonia	5	1	0	0	4	8	21	−13	3 (Note: Poland 1–2 Estonia)	
6	Poland	5	1	0	0	4	9	16	−7	3	Relegated to the 2024 Division II A

Source: IIHF
Rules for classification: 1) points; 2) head-to-head points; 3) head-to-head goal difference; 4) head-to-head number of goals scored; 5) result against closest best-ranked team outside tied teams; 6) result against second-best ranked team outside tied teams; 7) seeding before tournament.
(H) Host

=== Results ===
All times are local (UTC+2).

10 April 2023; 12:30	Poland	3–1 (1–0, 2–1, 0–0)	Austria	Ice Arena Bled, Bled

Game reference
19	Shots	42

10 April 2023; 16:00	Estonia	2–4 (0–0, 0–2, 2–2)	Italy	Ice Arena Bled, Bled

Game reference
24	Shots	29

10 April 2023; 19:30	South Korea	2–4 (0–1, 1–2, 1–1)	Slovenia	Ice Arena Bled, Bled

Game reference
21	Shots	38

11 April 2023; 12:30	Austria	7–1 (3–0, 2–0, 2–1)	Estonia	Ice Arena Bled, Bled

Game reference
50	Shots	9

11 April 2023; 16:00	Italy	3–2 (1–1, 1–1, 1–0)	South Korea	Ice Arena Bled, Bled

Game reference
14	Shots	30

11 April 2023; 19:30	Slovenia	6–3 (1–0, 3–2, 2–1)	Poland	Ice Arena Bled, Bled

Game reference
42	Shots	23

13 April 2023; 12:30	Estonia	2–5 (1–2, 0–1, 1–2)	South Korea	Ice Arena Bled, Bled

Game reference
27	Shots	37

13 April 2023; 16:00	Italy	1–0 (1–0, 0–0, 0–0)	Poland	Ice Arena Bled, Bled

Game reference
23	Shots	33

13 April 2023; 19:30	Slovenia	4–6 (0–2, 1–1, 3–3)	Austria	Ice Arena Bled, Bled

Game reference
32	Shots	20

15 April 2023; 12:30	South Korea	6–2 (2–0, 3–1, 1–1)	Poland	Ice Arena Bled, Bled; Attendance: 57

Game reference
2 min	Penalties	6 min
44	Shots	20

15 April 2023; 16:00	Slovenia	4–1 (2–0, 1–1, 1–0)	Estonia	Ice Arena Bled, Bled; Attendance: 403

Game reference
12 min	Penalties	8 min
36	Shots	17

15 April 2023; 19:30	Austria	3–0 (1–0, 0–0, 2–0)	Italy	Ice Arena Bled, Bled; Attendance: 315

Game reference
6 min	Penalties	8 min
24	Shots	15

16 April 2023; 12:30	Poland	1–2 (0–1, 0–0, 1–1)	Estonia	Ice Arena Bled, Bled; Attendance: 59

Game reference
10 min	Penalties	14 min
30	Shots	30

16 April 2023; 16:00	Austria	4–2 (1–0, 0–2, 3–0)	South Korea	Ice Arena Bled, Bled; Attendance: 250

Game reference
6 min	Penalties	4 min
33	Shots	23

16 April 2023; 19:30	Italy	1–2 OT (0–0, 1–0, 0–1) (OT: 0–1)	Slovenia	Ice Arena Bled, Bled; Attendance: 330

Game reference
8 min	Penalties	4 min
13	Shots	35
