= 1994 IIHF Asian Oceanic Junior U18 Championship =

Tournament details
- Host country: China
- Dates: 20 – 26 March
- Teams: 5

Final positions
- Champions: Kazakhstan (2nd title)
- Runner-up: South Korea
- Third place: Japan

Tournament statistics
- Games played: 10
- Scoring leader(s): (Kazakhstan) Stanislav Pinevsky

The 1994 IIHF Asian Oceanic Junior U18 Championship was the 11th edition of the IIHF Asian Oceanic Junior U18 Championship. It took place between 20 and 26 March 1993 in Pekin, China. The tournament was won by Kazakhstan, who claimed their second title by finishing first in the standings. South Korea and Japan finished second and third respectively.

== Standings ==
| Pos | Team | Pld | W | D | L | GF | GA | GD | Pts |
|---|---|---|---|---|---|---|---|---|---|
| 1 | Kazakhstan | 4 | 4 | 0 | 0 | 66 | 3 | +63 | 8 |
| 2 | South Korea | 4 | 2 | 1 | 1 | 42 | 16 | +26 | 5 |
| 3 | Japan | 4 | 2 | 1 | 1 | 42 | 23 | +19 | 5 |
| 4 | China | 4 | 1 | 0 | 3 | 26 | 20 | +6 | 2 |
| 5 | Australia | 4 | 0 | 0 | 4 | 0 | 114 | −114 | 0 |

== Fixtures ==
| Japan | 27 – 0 | Australia |

| South Korea | 5 – 3 | China |

| Kazakhstan | 41 – 0 | Australia |

| Japan | 8 – 8 | South Korea |

| Australia | 0 – 28 | South Korea |

| China | 1 – 9 | Kazakhstan |

| Kazakhstan | 5 – 1 | South Korea |

| China | 4 – 6 | Japan |

| Kazakhstan | 11 – 1 | Japan |

| China | 18 – 0 | Australia |
