= 2025 IIHF World U18 Championship Division I =

2025 IIHF U18 World Championship Division I
Tournament details
- Host countries: Hungary; Lithuania
- Venue(s): 2 (in 2 host cities)
- Dates: 20–26 April 2025 (A); 13–19 April 2025 (B)
- Teams: 12

The 2025 IIHF U18 World Championship Division I consists of two international under-18 ice hockey tournaments organized by the International Ice Hockey Federation. Divisions I A and I B represent the second and the third tier of the IIHF World U18 Championship.

== Division I A ==
2025 IIHF U18 World Championship Division I A

Tournament details
- Host country: Hungary
- City: Székesfehérvár
- Venue(s): 1 (in 1 host city)
- Dates: 20–26 April 2025
- Teams: 6

Tournament statistics
- Games played: 15
- Goals scored: 93 (6.2 per game)
- Attendance: 4,958 (331 per game)
- Scoring leader(s): (Denmark) William Bundgaard (10 points)

Official website
- www.iihf.com

The Division I Group A tournament was played in Székesfehérvár, Hungary, from 20 to 26 April 2025.

=== Participating teams ===
Team	Qualification
Kazakhstan	Placed 10th in Top Division last year and were relegated
Ukraine	Placed 2nd in Division I A last year
Austria	Placed 3rd in Division I A last year
Hungary	Hosts; placed 4th in Division I A last year
Denmark	Placed 5th in Division I A last year
Slovenia	Placed 1st in Division I B last year and were promoted

=== Standings ===
Pos	Team	Pld	W	OTW	OTL	L	GF	GA	GD	Pts	Promotion or relegation
1	Denmark	5	5	0	0	0	24	10	+14	15	Promoted to the 2026 Top Division
2	Ukraine	5	4	0	0	1	24	12	+12	12	
3	Kazakhstan	5	2	0	1	2	14	13	+1	7	
4	Slovenia	5	1	1	0	3	8	17	−9	5	
5	Hungary (H)	5	1	0	0	4	8	21	−13	3 (Note: Austria 3–4 Hungary)	
6	Austria	5	1	0	0	4	15	20	−5	3	Relegated to the 2026 Division I B

Source: IIHF
Rules for classification: 1) points; 2) head-to-head points; 3) head-to-head goal difference; 4) head-to-head number of goals scored; 5) result against closest best-ranked team outside tied teams; 6) result against second-best ranked team outside tied teams; 7) seeding before tournament.
(H) Host

=== Match results ===
All times are local. (Central European Summer Time – UTC+2)

20 April 2025; 12:30	Denmark	5–3 (3–1, 2–1, 0–1)	Austria	Alba Arena, Székesfehérvár; Attendance: 91

Game reference
6 min	Penalties	8 min
25	Shots	31

20 April 2025; 16:00	Hungary	1–7 (1–2, 0–2, 0–3)	Ukraine	Alba Arena, Székesfehérvár; Attendance: 812

Game reference
14 min	Penalties	8 min
19	Shots	59

20 April 2025; 19:30	Slovenia	3–2 GWS (1–1, 1–0, 0–1); OT: (0–0); SO: (1–0)	Kazakhstan	Alba Arena, Székesfehérvár; Attendance: 102

Game reference
4 min	Penalties	8 min
28	Shots	41

21 April 2025; 12:30	Ukraine	1–5 (1–3, 0–1, 0–1)	Denmark	Alba Arena, Székesfehérvár; Attendance: 113

Game reference
6 min	Penalties	4 min
31	Shots	17

21 April 2025; 16:00	Austria	4–1 (3–0, 0–1, 1–0)	Slovenia	Alba Arena, Székesfehérvár; Attendance: 162

Game reference
2 min	Penalties	2 min
27	Shots	28

21 April 2025; 19:30	Kazakhstan	4–0 (2–0, 2–0, 0–0)	Hungary	Alba Arena, Székesfehérvár; Attendance: 618

Game reference
22 min	Penalties	18 min
38	Shots	35

23 April 2025; 12:30	Ukraine	6–3 (1–1, 5–1, 0–1)	Austria	Alba Arena, Székesfehérvár; Attendance: 115

Game reference
12 min	Penalties	8 min
44	Shots	30

23 April 2025; 16:00	Slovenia	2–0 (0–0, 2–0, 0–0)	Hungary	Alba Arena, Székesfehérvár; Attendance: 561

Game reference
12 min	Penalties	12 min
34	Shots	26

23 April 2025; 19:30	Kazakhstan	2–5 (0–0, 2–2, 0–3)	Denmark	Alba Arena, Székesfehérvár; Attendance: 147

Game reference
27 min	Penalties	6 min
26	Shots	20

24 April 2025; 12:30	Ukraine	7–1 (3–1, 2–0, 2–0)	Slovenia	Alba Arena, Székesfehérvár; Attendance: 89

Game reference
10 min	Penalties	18 min
44	Shots	15

24 April 2025; 16:00	Austria	2–4 (0–3, 1–0, 1–1)	Kazakhstan	Alba Arena, Székesfehérvár; Attendance: 105

Game reference
43 min	Penalties	6 min
33	Shots	29

24 April 2025; 19:30	Hungary	3–5 (1–1, 1–1, 1–3)	Denmark	Alba Arena, Székesfehérvár; Attendance: 678

Game reference
12 min	Penalties	14 min
21	Shots	29

26 April 2025; 12:30	Denmark	4–1 (0–0, 1–0, 3–1)	Slovenia	Alba Arena, Székesfehérvár; Attendance: 135

Game reference
8 min	Penalties	8 min
31	Shots	34

26 April 2025; 16:00	Austria	3–4 (1–2, 2–2, 0–0)	Hungary	Alba Arena, Székesfehérvár; Attendance: 1,083

Game reference
8 min	Penalties	12 min
45	Shots	17

26 April 2025; 19:30	Kazakhstan	2–3 (0–1, 2–2, 0–0)	Ukraine	Alba Arena, Székesfehérvár; Attendance: 147

Game reference
6 min	Penalties	29 min
22	Shots	26

== Division I B ==
2025 IIHF U18 World Championship Division I B

Tournament details
- Host country: Lithuania
- City: Kaunas
- Venue(s): 1 (in 1 host city)
- Dates: 13–19 April 2025
- Teams: 6

Tournament statistics
- Games played: 15
- Goals scored: 92 (6.13 per game)
- Attendance: 6,733 (449 per game)
- Scoring leader(s): (Lithuania) Mykolas Škadauskas (10 points)

Official website
- www.iihf.com

The Division I Group B tournament was played in Kaunas, Lithuania, from 13 to 19 April 2025.

=== Participating teams ===
Team	Qualification
Japan	Placed 6th in 2024 Division I A and were relegated
Lithuania	Hosts; placed 2nd in Division I B last year
Estonia	Placed 3rd in Division I B last year
France	Placed 4th in Division I B last year
South Korea	Placed 5th in Division I B last year
Poland	Placed 1st in Division II A last year and were promoted

=== Final standings ===
Pos	Team	Pld	W	OTW	OTL	L	GF	GA	GD	Pts	Promotion or relegation
1	Poland	5	3	1	0	1	19	12	+7	11	Promoted to the 2026 Division I A
2	Lithuania (H)	5	3	0	0	2	21	14	+7	9 (Note: Lithuania 7–4 South Korea)	
3	South Korea	5	3	0	0	2	21	16	+5	9	
4	France	5	2	0	1	2	12	12	0	7	
5	Estonia	5	1	1	0	3	8	20	−12	5	
6	Japan	5	1	0	1	3	11	18	−7	4	Relegated to the 2026 Division II A

Source: IIHF
Rules for classification: 1) points; 2) head-to-head points; 3) head-to-head goal difference; 4) head-to-head number of goals scored; 5) result against closest best-ranked team outside tied teams; 6) result against second-best ranked team outside tied teams; 7) seeding before tournament.
(H) Host

=== Match results ===
All times are local. (Eastern European Summer Time – UTC+3)

13 April 2025; 12:30	Poland	4–1 (1–1, 2–0, 1–0)	Japan	Kaunas Ice Palace

Game reference
8 min	Penalties	10 min
32	Shots	22

13 April 2025; 16:00	France	3–2 (1–2, 2–0, 0–0)	Lithuania	Kaunas Ice Palace

Game reference
8 min	Penalties	10 min
33	Shots	21

13 April 2025; 19:30	South Korea	7–0 (1–0, 4–0, 2–0)	Estonia	Kaunas Ice Palace

Game reference
8 min	Penalties	4 min
41	Shots	23

14 April 2025; 12:30	Japan	2–1 (0–0, 1–1, 1–0)	France	Kaunas Ice Palace

Game reference
8 min	Penalties	6 min
16	Shots	29

14 April 2025; 16:00	Estonia	1–5 (1–0, 0–3, 0–2)	Poland	Kaunas Ice Palace

Game reference
4 min	Penalties	4 min
22	Shots	36

14 April 2025; 19:30	Lithuania	7–4 (0–2, 4–1, 3–1)	South Korea	Kaunas Ice Palace

Game reference
10 min	Penalties	12 min
37	Shots	25

16 April 2025; 12:30	Poland	4–3 GWS (2–1, 0–1, 1–1) (OT: 0–0, GWS: 1–0)	France	Kaunas Ice Palace

Game reference
6 min	Penalties	10 min
26	Shots	31

16 April 2025; 16:00	Japan	2–3 (1–2, 1–0, 0–1)	South Korea	Kaunas Ice Palace

Game reference
8 min	Penalties	8 min
33	Shots	25

16 April 2025; 19:30	Lithuania	4–1 (3–1, 0–0, 1–0)	Estonia	Kaunas Ice Palace

Game reference
10 min	Penalties	8 min
28	Shots	24

18 April 2025; 12:30	France	4–2 (0–1, 3–0, 1–1)	South Korea	Kaunas Ice Palace

Game reference
8 min	Penalties	4 min
40	Shots	22

18 April 2025; 16:00	Estonia	4–3 GWS (2–1, 0–1, 1–1) (OT: 0–0, GWS: 1–0)	Japan	Kaunas Ice Palace

Game reference
2 min	Penalties	6 min
22	Shots	21

18 April 2025; 19:30	Lithuania	2–3 (1–1, 0–1, 1–1)	Poland	Kaunas Ice Palace

Game reference
6 min	Penalties	4 min
26	Shots	25

19 April 2025; 12:30	Estonia	2–1 (1–0, 1–0, 0–1)	France	Kaunas Ice Palace

Game reference
8 min	Penalties	10 min
28	Shots	42

19 April 2025; 16:00	South Korea	5–3 (1–0, 4–0, 0–3)	Poland	Kaunas Ice Palace

Game reference
6 min	Penalties	2 min
26	Shots	29

19 April 2025; 19:30	Japan	3–6 (0–4, 2–1, 1–1)	Lithuania	Kaunas Ice Palace

Game reference
8 min	Penalties	10 min
15	Shots	33
