= 2019 IIHF World U18 Championship Division II =

2019 IIHF U18 World Championship Division II
Tournament details
- Host countries: Lithuania; Serbia
- Dates: 7–13 April 2019; 25–31 March 2019
- Teams: 12

The 2019 IIHF U18 World Championship Division II competitions were two international under-18 ice hockey tournaments organised by the International Ice Hockey Federation. The Division II A and Division II B tournaments represent the fourth and the fifth tier of the IIHF World U18 Championship.

== Division II A ==
2019 IIHF U18 World Championship Division II A

Tournament details
- Host country: Lithuania
- Venue(s): 1 (in 1 host city)
- Dates: 7–13 April
- Teams: 6

Tournament statistics
- Games played: 15
- Goals scored: 118 (7.87 per game)
- Attendance: 17,351 (1,157 per game)
- Scoring leader(s): (Poland) Sebastian Brynkus (16 points)

Official website
- IIHF.com

The Division II A tournament was played in Elektrėnai, Lithuania, from 7 to 13 April 2019.

=== Participants ===
Team	Qualification
Romania	placed 6th in 2018 Division I B and were relegated
Lithuania	hosts; placed 2nd in 2018 Division II A
Poland	placed 3rd in 2018 Division II A
South Korea	placed 4th in 2018 Division II A
Estonia	placed 5th in 2018 Division II A
Spain	placed 1st in 2018 Division II B and were promoted

=== Standings ===
Pos	Team	Pld	W	OTW	OTL	L	GF	GA	GD	Pts	Promotion or relegation
1	Poland	5	5	0	0	0	36	4	+32	15	Promoted to the 2022 Division I B
2	Lithuania (H)	5	4	0	0	1	21	15	+6	12	
3	Estonia	5	3	0	0	2	21	19	+2	9	
4	Romania	5	1	1	0	3	17	24	−7	5	
5	South Korea	5	1	0	0	4	17	19	−2	3	
6	Spain	5	0	0	1	4	6	37	−31	1	Relegated to the 2022 Division II B

Source: IIHF
(H) Host

=== Results ===
All times are local. (Eastern European Summer Time – UTC+3)

7 April 2019; 12:30	Spain	0–10 (0–4, 0–4, 0–2)	South Korea	Elektrėnai Arena, Elektrėnai; Attendance: 309

Game reference
16 min	Penalties	8 min
26	Shots	22

7 April 2019; 16:00	Lithuania	6–3 (1–1, 3–2, 2–0)	Estonia	Elektrėnai Arena, Elektrėnai; Attendance: 2,005

Game reference
14 min	Penalties	10 min
18	Shots	28

7 April 2019; 19:30	Poland	3–1 (1–0, 0–1, 2–0)	Romania	Elektrėnai Arena, Elektrėnai; Attendance: 439

Game reference
6 min	Penalties	8 min
49	Shots	10

9 April 2019; 12:30	Romania	6–4 (3–1, 2–2, 1–1)	South Korea	Elektrėnai Arena, Elektrėnai; Attendance: 1,003

Game reference
4 min	Penalties	10 min
15	Shots	41

9 April 2019; 16:00	Estonia	5–1 (1–0, 2–0, 2–1)	Spain	Elektrėnai Arena, Elektrėnai; Attendance: 458

Game reference
14 min	Penalties	14 min
29	Shots	34

9 April 2019; 19:30	Lithuania	1–7 (0–0, 1–4, 0–3)	Poland	Elektrėnai Arena, Elektrėnai; Attendance: 2,406

Game reference
8 min	Penalties	12 min
14	Shots	38

10 April 2019; 12:30	Romania	2–5 (0–2, 1–1, 1–2)	Estonia	Elektrėnai Arena, Elektrėnai; Attendance: 516

Game reference
14 min	Penalties	6 min
16	Shots	49

10 April 2019; 16:00	Poland	5–0 (2–0, 2–0, 1–0)	South Korea	Elektrėnai Arena, Elektrėnai; Attendance: 1,359

Game reference
20 min	Penalties	12 min
25	Shots	24

10 April 2019; 19:30	Lithuania	4–1 (1–0, 2–1, 1–0)	Spain	Elektrėnai Arena, Elektrėnai; Attendance: 1,386

Game reference
14 min	Penalties	26 min
26	Shots	29

12 April 2019; 12:30	Estonia	2–8 (0–3, 1–2, 1–3)	Poland	Elektrėnai Arena, Elektrėnai; Attendance: 1,546

Game reference
14 min	Penalties	10 min
16	Shots	50

12 April 2019; 16:00	Spain	4–5 OT (1–3, 2–0, 1–1); OT: (0–1)	Romania	Elektrėnai Arena, Elektrėnai; Attendance: 1,014

Game reference
8 min	Penalties	10 min
41	Shots	24

12 April 2019; 19:30	South Korea	1–2 (0–0, 1–1, 0–1)	Lithuania	Elektrėnai Arena, Elektrėnai; Attendance: 1,907

Game reference
24 min	Penalties	10 min
28	Shots	21

13 April 2019; 12:30	Poland	13–0 (3–0, 5–0, 5–0)	Spain	Elektrėnai Arena, Elektrėnai; Attendance: 207

Game reference
10 min	Penalties	16 min
40	Shots	13

13 April 2019; 16:00	South Korea	2–6 (0–2, 1–2, 1–2)	Estonia	Elektrėnai Arena, Elektrėnai; Attendance: 489

Game reference
16 min	Penalties	14 min
41	Shots	32

13 April 2019; 19:30	Romania	3–8 (1–4, 0–1, 2–3)	Lithuania	Elektrėnai Arena, Elektrėnai; Attendance: 2,307

Game reference
2 min	Penalties	6 min
25	Shots	45

=== Awards ===
Best Players Selected by the Directorate

- Goaltender: (Lithuania) Nikita Kuzminov
- Defenceman: (Poland) Szymon Bieniek
- Forward: (Estonia) Kirill Lodeikin

Source: IIHF

== Division II B ==
2019 IIHF U18 World Championship Division II B

Tournament details
- Host country: Serbia
- Venue(s): 1 (in 1 host city)
- Dates: 25–31 March
- Teams: 6

Tournament statistics
- Games played: 15
- Goals scored: 102 (6.8 per game)
- Attendance: 4,274 (285 per game)
- Scoring leader(s): (Serbia) Strahinja Vdović (11 points)

Official website
- IIHF.com

The Division II B tournament was played in Belgrade, Serbia, from 25 to 31 March 2019.

=== Participants ===
Team	Qualification
Australia	placed 6th in 2018 Division II A and were relegated
Croatia	placed 2nd in 2018 Division II B
Serbia	hosts; placed 3rd in 2018 Division II B
Netherlands	placed 4th in 2018 Division II B
China	placed 5th in 2018 Division II B
Belgium	placed 1st in 2018 Division III A and were promoted

=== Standings ===
Pos	Team	Pld	W	OTW	OTL	L	GF	GA	GD	Pts	Promotion or relegation
1	Serbia (H)	5	4	0	1	0	31	10	+21	13	Promoted to the 2022 Division II A
2	China	5	4	0	0	1	18	15	+3	12	
3	Netherlands	5	3	1	0	1	13	9	+4	11	
4	Croatia	5	2	0	0	3	16	14	+2	6	
5	Australia	5	1	0	0	4	12	21	−9	3	
6	Belgium	5	0	0	0	5	12	33	−21	0	Relegated to the 2022 Division III A

Source: IIHF
(H) Host

=== Results ===
All times are local. (to 30 March: Central European Time – UTC+1, 31 March: Central European Summer Time – UTC+2)

25 March 2019; 13:00	Belgium	2–4 (0–1, 1–1, 1–2)	Netherlands	Pionir Ice Hall, Belgrade; Attendance: 39

Game reference
8 min	Penalties	8 min
20	Shots	45

25 March 2019; 16:30	Croatia	1–4 (1–0, 0–2, 0–2)	China	Pionir Ice Hall, Belgrade; Attendance: 24

Game reference
32 min	Penalties	14 min
25	Shots	37

25 March 2019; 20:30	Serbia	8–4 (3–2, 2–0, 3–2)	Australia	Pionir Ice Hall, Belgrade; Attendance: 669

Game reference
6 min	Penalties	10 min
33	Shots	17

26 March 2019; 13:00	China	6–4 (1–2, 2–2, 3–0)	Belgium	Pionir Ice Hall, Belgrade; Attendance: 25

Game reference
14 min	Penalties	20 min
39	Shots	22

26 March 2019; 16:30	Australia	1–2 (0–0, 0–2, 1–0)	Netherlands	Pionir Ice Hall, Belgrade; Attendance: 38

Game reference
12 min	Penalties	14 min
31	Shots	27

26 March 2019; 20:00	Croatia	1–4 (1–0, 0–1, 0–3)	Serbia	Pionir Ice Hall, Belgrade; Attendance: 627

Game reference
10 min	Penalties	33 min
19	Shots	47

28 March 2019; 13:00	Australia	2–4 (0–1, 1–1, 1–2)	China	Pionir Ice Hall, Belgrade; Attendance: 32

Game reference
18 min	Penalties	18 min
30	Shots	40

28 March 2019; 16:30	Croatia	7–2 (1–1, 4–1, 2–0)	Belgium	Pionir Ice Hall, Belgrade; Attendance: 29

Game reference
16 min	Penalties	24 min
30	Shots	26

28 March 2019; 20:00	Serbia	1–2 OT (0–0, 1–0, 0–1); OT: (0–1)	Netherlands	Pionir Ice Hall, Belgrade; Attendance: 786

Game reference
12 min	Penalties	20 min
36	Shots	19

30 March 2019; 13:00	Netherlands	3–2 (1–1, 1–0, 1–1)	Croatia	Pionir Ice Hall, Belgrade; Attendance: 105

Game reference
24 min	Penalties	12 min
28	Shots	23

30 March 2019; 16:30	Belgium	2–4 (0–0, 1–3, 1–1)	Australia	Pionir Ice Hall, Belgrade; Attendance: 52

Game reference
10 min	Penalties	8 min
31	Shots	37

30 March 2019; 20:00	China	1–6 (0–3, 1–2, 0–1)	Serbia	Pionir Ice Hall, Belgrade; Attendance: 669

Game reference
8 min	Penalties	10 min
26	Shots	38

31 March 2019; 13:00	Australia	1–5 (1–3, 0–0, 0–2)	Croatia	Pionir Ice Hall, Belgrade; Attendance: 62

Game reference
48 min	Penalties	12 min
33	Shots	40

31 March 2019; 16:30	Netherlands	2–3 (2–1, 0–1, 0–1)	China	Pionir Ice Hall, Belgrade; Attendance: 93

Game reference
14 min	Penalties	6 min
32	Shots	28

31 March 2019; 20:00	Serbia	12–2 (5–0, 5–2, 2–0)	Belgium	Pionir Ice Hall, Belgrade; Attendance: 1,024

Game reference
18 min	Penalties	12 min
47	Shots	15

=== Awards ===
Best Players Selected by the Directorate

- Goaltender: (Netherlands) Jowin Ansems
- Defenceman: (Netherlands) Ernesto Klem
- Forward: (Serbia) Strahinja Vdović

Source: IIHF
