= Estonia men's national under-18 ice hockey team =

Men's national under-18 ice hockey team representing Estonia

Estonia
- Association: Estonian Ice Hockey Association
- General manager: Jüri Rooba
- Head coach: Balint Fekti
- Assistants: Alexander Smetanin; Sergei Novikov
- Home stadium: Tondiraba Ice Hall
- Team colors
- IIHF code: EST

IIHF World U18 Championship
- Appearances: 26 (first in 2001)
- Best result: 19th (2024)

The Estonia men's national under-18 ice hockey team represents Estonia in international under-18 ice hockey competitions and is controlled by the Estonian Ice Hockey Association (Estonian: Eesti Jäähokiliit).

== Tournament record ==
=== IIHF World U18 Championships ===
- 1999: 4th in European Division I
- 2000: 2nd in European Division I
- 2001: 4th in Division II
- 2002: 4th in Division IIB
- 2003: 2nd in Division II Group A
- 2004: 2nd in Division II Group B
- 2005: 2nd in Division II Group A
- 2006: 3rd in Division II Group A
- 2007: 3rd in Division II Group A
- 2008: 3rd in Division II Group B
- 2009: 2nd in Division II Group B
- 2010: 5th in Division II Group A
- 2011: 4th in Division II Group A
- 2012: 1st in Division IIB
- 2013: 6th in Division IIA
- 2014: 1st in Division IIB
- 2015: 6th in Division IIA
- 2016: 1st in Division IIB
- 2017: 2nd in Division IIA
- 2018: 5th in Division IIA
- 2019: 3rd in Division IIA
- 2020: Cancelled due to the COVID-19 pandemic
- 2021: Cancelled due to the COVID-19 pandemic
- 2022: 2nd in Division IIA
- 2023: 5th in Division IB
- 2024: 3rd in Division IB
- 2025: 5th in Division IB
- 2026: 4th in Division IB

== See also ==
- Estonia men's national ice hockey team
- Estonia men's national under-20 ice hockey team
