= 2024 IIHF World U18 Championship Division I =

International ice hockey tournaments

2024 IIHF U18 World Championship Division I
Tournament details
- Host countries: Denmark; Estonia
- Venues: 2 (in 2 host cities)
- Dates: 14–20 April 2024
- Teams: 12

The 2024 IIHF U18 World Championship Division I is two international under-18 ice hockey tournaments organised by the International Ice Hockey Federation. The Divisions I A and I B represent the second and the third tier of the IIHF World U18 Championship.

== Division I A ==
2024 IIHF U18 World Championship Division I A

Tournament details
- Host country: Denmark
- City: Frederikshavn
- Venue: 1 (in 1 host city)
- Dates: 14–20 April 2024
- Teams: 6

Tournament statistics
- Games played: 15
- Goals scored: 106 (7.07 per game)
- Attendance: 3,992 (266 per game)
- Scoring leader: (Hungary) Ferenc Laskawy (11 points)

Official website
- www.iihf.com

The Division I Group A tournament was played in Frederikshavn, Denmark, from 14 to 20 April 2024.

=== Participating teams ===
Team	Qualification
Germany	Placed 10th in 2023 Top Division and were relegated
Denmark	Hosts; placed 2nd in 2023 Division I A
Japan	Placed 3rd in 2023 Division I A
Hungary	Placed 4th in 2023 Division I A
Ukraine	Placed 5th in 2023 Division I A
Austria	Placed 1st in 2023 Division I B and were promoted

=== Standings ===
Pos	Team	Pld	W	OTW	OTL	L	GF	GA	GD	Pts	Promotion or relegation
1	Germany	5	4	1	0	0	25	11	+14	14	Promoted to the 2025 Top Division
2	Ukraine	5	4	0	1	0	18	10	+8	13	
3	Austria	5	2	1	0	2	21	14	+7	8	
4	Hungary	5	2	0	1	2	21	25	−4	7	
5	Denmark (H)	5	1	0	0	4	10	20	−10	3	
6	Japan	5	0	0	0	5	11	26	−15	0	Relegated to the 2025 Division I B

Source: IIHF
Rules for classification: 1) points; 2) head-to-head points; 3) head-to-head goal difference; 4) head-to-head number of goals scored; 5) result against closest best-ranked team outside tied teams; 6) result against second-best ranked team outside tied teams; 7) seeding before tournament.
(H) Host

=== Results and schedule ===
All times are local. (Central European Summer Time – UTC+2)

14 April 2024; 13:00	Austria	2–3 (1–0, 1–1, 0–2)	Germany	Iscenter Nord, Frederikshavn; Attendance: 225

Game reference
10 min	Penalties	6 min
17	Shots	27

14 April 2024; 16:30	Hungary	4–1 (1–0, 2–0, 1–0)	Denmark	Iscenter Nord, Frederikshavn; Attendance: 485

Game reference
6 min	Penalties	2 min
25	Shots	25

14 April 2024; 20:00	Ukraine	4–1 (0–0, 3–0, 1–1)	Japan	Iscenter Nord, Frederikshavn; Attendance: 140

Game reference
10 min	Penalties	8 min
37	Shots	24

15 April 2024; 13:00	Germany	8–2 (2–1, 4–1, 2–0)	Hungary	Iscenter Nord, Frederikshavn; Attendance: 145

Game reference
4 min	Penalties	31 min
42	Shots	22

15 April 2024; 16:30	Japan	3–6 (0–3, 1–2, 2–1)	Austria	Iscenter Nord, Frederikshavn; Attendance: 120

Game reference
12 min	Penalties	8 min
18	Shots	45

15 April 2024; 20:00	Denmark	1–3 (0–0, 1–2, 0–1)	Ukraine	Iscenter Nord, Frederikshavn; Attendance: 515

Game reference
10 min	Penalties	10 min
15	Shots	32

17 April 2024; 13:00	Austria	6–5 GWS (0–1, 2–2, 3–2); OT: (0–0); SO: (1–0)	Hungary	Iscenter Nord, Frederikshavn; Attendance: 147

Game reference
4 min	Penalties	8 min
41	Shots	33

17 April 2024; 16:30	Germany	2–1 OT (0–1, 1–0, 0–0); OT: (1–0)	Ukraine	Iscenter Nord, Frederikshavn; Attendance: 208

Game reference
8 min	Penalties	12 min
37	Shots	31

17 April 2024; 20:00	Denmark	4–2 (2–1, 0–1, 2–0)	Japan	Iscenter Nord, Frederikshavn; Attendance: 367

Game reference
8 min	Penalties	6 min
36	Shots	29

18 April 2024; 13:00	Hungary	4–7 (0–1, 1–4, 3–2)	Ukraine	Iscenter Nord, Frederikshavn; Attendance: 115

Game reference
10 min	Penalties	31 min
55	Shots	29

18 April 2024; 16:30	Japan	2–6 (1–2, 0–3, 1–1)	Germany	Iscenter Nord, Frederikshavn; Attendance: 148

Game reference
8 min	Penalties	8 min
23	Shots	66

18 April 2024; 20:00	Denmark	0–5 (0–1, 0–2, 0–2)	Austria	Iscenter Nord, Frederikshavn; Attendance: 385

Game reference
4 min	Penalties	6 min
11	Shots	30

20 April 2024; 13:00	Ukraine	3–2 (0–0, 1–2, 2–0)	Austria	Iscenter Nord, Frederikshavn; Attendance: 147

Game reference
6 min	Penalties	8 min
46	Shots	28

20 April 2024; 16:30	Japan	3–6 (0–1, 0–2, 3–3)	Hungary	Iscenter Nord, Frederikshavn; Attendance: 115

Game reference
0 min	Penalties	6 min
30	Shots	45

20 April 2024; 20:00	Germany	6–4 (0–1, 2–2, 4–1)	Denmark	Iscenter Nord, Frederikshavn; Attendance: 730

Game reference
6 min	Penalties	6 min
37	Shots	27

== Division I B ==
2024 IIHF U18 World Championship Division I B

Tournament details
- Host country: Estonia
- City: Tallinn
- Venue: 1 (in 1 host city)
- Dates: 14–20 April 2024
- Teams: 6

Tournament statistics
- Games played: 15
- Goals scored: 98 (6.53 per game)
- Attendance: 10,399 (693 per game)
- Scoring leader: (Slovenia) Nik Petrović (13 points)

Official website
- www.iihf.com

The Division I Group B tournament was played in Tallinn, Estonia, from 14 to 20 April 2024.

=== Participating teams ===
Team	Qualification
France	Placed 6th in 2023 Division I A and were relegated
Slovenia	Placed 2nd in 2023 Division I B
Italy	Placed 3rd in 2023 Division I B
South Korea	Placed 4th in 2023 Division I B
Estonia	Hosts; placed 5th in 2023 Division I B
Lithuania	Placed 1st in 2023 Division II A and were promoted

=== Standings ===
Pos	Team	Pld	W	OTW	OTL	L	GF	GA	GD	Pts	Promotion or relegation
1	Slovenia	5	4	0	0	1	29	14	+15	12	Promoted to the 2025 Division I A
2	Lithuania	5	3	1	0	1	16	12	+4	11	
3	Estonia (H)	5	2	0	0	3	13	20	−7	6 (Note: Estonia 6 Pts, France 3 Pts, South Korea 0 Pts)	
4	France	5	2	0	0	3	15	19	−4	6	
5	South Korea	5	2	0	0	3	15	17	−2	6	
6	Italy	5	1	0	1	3	10	16	−6	4	Relegated to the 2025 Division II A

Source: IIHF
Rules for classification: 1) points; 2) head-to-head points; 3) head-to-head goal difference; 4) head-to-head number of goals scored; 5) result against closest best-ranked team outside tied teams; 6) result against second-best ranked team outside tied teams; 7) seeding before tournament.
(H) Host

=== Results and schedule ===
All times are local. (Eastern European Summer Time – UTC+3)

14 April 2024; 12:30	Lithuania	3–1 (0–0, 1–0, 2–1)	France	Tondiraba Ice Hall, Tallinn; Attendance: 387

Game reference
37 min	Penalties	0 min
24	Shots	40

14 April 2024; 16:00	Estonia	0–4 (0–2, 0–1, 0–1)	Italy	Tondiraba Ice Hall, Tallinn; Attendance: 2,287

Game reference
6 min	Penalties	10 min
21	Shots	29

14 April 2024; 19:30	South Korea	5–3 (1–0, 1–1, 3–2)	Slovenia	Tondiraba Ice Hall, Tallinn; Attendance: 232

Game reference
10 min	Penalties	8 min
25	Shots	26

15 April 2024; 12:30	Italy	1–2 OT (1–0, 0–0, 0–1); OT: (0–1)	Lithuania	Tondiraba Ice Hall, Tallinn; Attendance: 235

Game reference
29 min	Penalties	33 min
18	Shots	26

15 April 2024; 16:00	France	3–1 (1–1, 2–0, 0–0)	South Korea	Tondiraba Ice Hall, Tallinn; Attendance: 318

Game reference
8 min	Penalties	2 min
44	Shots	16

15 April 2024; 19:30	Slovenia	6–2 (1–1, 2–0, 3–1)	Estonia	Tondiraba Ice Hall, Tallinn; Attendance: 743

Game reference
6 min	Penalties	4 min
31	Shots	20

17 April 2024; 12:30	Slovenia	4–3 (2–1, 2–0, 0–2)	Italy	Tondiraba Ice Hall, Tallinn; Attendance: 173

Game reference
10 min	Penalties	14 min
23	Shots	28

17 April 2024; 16:00	Lithuania	5–2 (0–1, 1–1, 4–0)	South Korea	Tondiraba Ice Hall, Tallinn; Attendance: 297

Game reference
8 min	Penalties	27 min
31	Shots	10

17 April 2024; 19:30	France	3–4 (2–2, 1–1, 0–1)	Estonia	Tondiraba Ice Hall, Tallinn; Attendance: 1327

Game reference
12 min	Penalties	8 min
28	Shots	19

19 April 2024; 12:30	Italy	0–6 (0–2, 0–2, 0–2)	France	Tondiraba Ice Hall, Tallinn; Attendance: 632

Game reference
6 min	Penalties	4 min
26	Shots	35

19 April 2024; 16:00	Slovenia	5–2 (2–1, 2–0, 1–1)	Lithuania	Tondiraba Ice Hall, Tallinn; Attendance: 701

Game reference
10 min	Penalties	10 min
24	Shots	29

19 April 2024; 19:30	South Korea	3–4 (1–2, 0–2, 2–0)	Estonia	Tondiraba Ice Hall, Tallinn; Attendance: 998

Game reference
10 min	Penalties	4 min
24	Shots	31

20 April 2024; 12:30	France	2–11 (0–6, 0–3, 2–2)	Slovenia	Tondiraba Ice Hall, Tallinn; Attendance: 291

Game reference
10 min	Penalties	2 min
23	Shots	36

20 April 2024; 16:00	Estonia	3–4 (3–2, 0–2, 0–0)	Lithuania	Tondiraba Ice Hall, Tallinn; Attendance: 1,123

Game reference
8 min	Penalties	33 min
26	Shots	34

20 April 2024; 19:30	Italy	2–4 (0–1, 1–1, 1–2)	South Korea	Tondiraba Ice Hall, Tallinn; Attendance: 655

Game reference
8 min	Penalties	0 min
20	Shots	31
