= 2013 IIHF World U18 Championship Division II =

2013 IIHF U18 World Championship Division II

Tournament details
- Host countries: Estonia; Serbia
- Venue(s): 2 (in 2 host cities)
- Dates: 31 March – 6 April 2013; 9–15 March 2013
- Teams: 12

The 2013 IIHF U18 World Championship Division II was two international under-18 ice hockey tournaments organised by the International Ice Hockey Federation. The Division II A and Division II B tournaments represent the fourth and the fifth tier of the IIHF World U18 Championships.

== Division II A ==
The Division II A tournament was played in Tallinn, Estonia, from 31 March to 6 April 2013.

=== Participants ===
| Team | Qualification |
|---|---|
| Hungary | placed 6th in 2012 Division I B and were relegated |
| Romania | placed 2nd in 2012 Division II A |
| Lithuania | placed 3rd in 2012 Division II A |
| Great Britain | placed 4th in 2012 Division II A |
| Croatia | placed 5th in 2012 Division II A |
| Estonia | hosts, placed 1st in 2012 Division II B and were promoted |

=== Final standings ===
| Pos | Team | Pld | W | OTW | OTL | L | GF | GA | GD | Pts | Promotion or relegation |
|---|---|---|---|---|---|---|---|---|---|---|---|
| 1 | Hungary | 5 | 4 | 1 | 0 | 0 | 23 | 9 | +14 | 14 | Promoted to the 2014 Division I B |
| 2 | Croatia | 5 | 2 | 1 | 1 | 1 | 18 | 12 | +6 | 9 | |
| 3 | Romania | 5 | 2 | 0 | 3 | 0 | 13 | 13 | 0 | 9 | |
| 4 | Great Britain | 5 | 2 | 1 | 0 | 2 | 17 | 17 | 0 | 8 | |
| 5 | Lithuania | 5 | 0 | 2 | 0 | 3 | 17 | 19 | −2 | 4 | |
| 6 | Estonia | 5 | 0 | 0 | 1 | 4 | 13 | 31 | −18 | 1 | Relegated to the 2014 Division II B |

Source: IIHF

=== Results ===
All times are local. (Eastern European Summer Time – UTC+3)

| 31 March 2013; 13:00 | Romania | 3–4 GWS (0–0, 2–2, 1–1) (0–0, 0–1) | Croatia | Arena Premia, Tallinn |

Game reference

| 31 March 2013; 16:30 | Lithuania | 2–4 (0–2, 0–2, 2–0) | Hungary | Arena Premia, Tallinn |

Game reference

| 31 March 2013; 20:00 | Estonia | 3–7 (0–2, 2–4, 1–1) | Great Britain | Arena Premia, Tallinn |

Game reference

| 1 April 2013; 13:00 | Romania | 4–3 (1–0, 3–2, 0–1) | Lithuania | Arena Premia, Tallinn |

Game reference

| 1 April 2013; 16:30 | Hungary | 6–2 (1–1, 4–1, 1–0) | Great Britain | Arena Premia, Tallinn |

Game reference

| 1 April 2013; 20:00 | Croatia | 5–0 (2–0, 1–0, 2–0) | Estonia | Arena Premia, Tallinn |

Game reference

| 3 April 2013; 13:00 | Lithuania | 2–3 (1–1, 1–1, 0–1) | Great Britain | Arena Premia, Tallinn |

Game reference

| 3 April 2013; 16:30 | Hungary | 2–1 (1–0, 0–0, 1–1) | Croatia | Arena Premia, Tallinn |

Game reference

| 3 April 2013; 20:00 | Romania | 4–2 (1–1, 2–1, 1–0) | Estonia | Arena Premia, Tallinn |

Game reference

| 4 April 2013; 13:00 | Croatia | 3–4 GWS (0–3, 2–0, 1–0) (0–0, 0–1) | Lithuania | Arena Premia, Tallinn |

Game reference

| 4 April 2013; 16:30 | Great Britain | 2–1 GWS (0–0, 0–1, 1–0) (0–0, 1–0) | Romania | Arena Premia, Tallinn |

Game reference

| 4 April 2013; 20:00 | Estonia | 3–9 (2–3, 0–5, 1–1) | Hungary | Arena Premia, Tallinn |

Game reference

| 6 April 2013; 13:00 | Hungary | 2–1 GWS (0–0, 0–1, 1–0) (0–0, 1–0) | Romania | Arena Premia, Tallinn |

Game reference

| 6 April 2013; 16:30 | Great Britain | 3–5 (1–1, 1–2, 1–2) | Croatia | Arena Premia, Tallinn |

Game reference

| 6 April 2013; 20:00 | Lithuania | 6–5 GWS (0–0, 2–2, 3–3) (0–0, 1–0) | Estonia | Arena Premia, Tallinn |

Game reference

== Division II B ==
The Division II B tournament was played in Belgrade, Serbia, from 9 to 15 March 2013.

=== Participants ===
| Team | Qualification |
|---|---|
| Netherlands | placed 6th in 2012 Division II A and were relegated |
| Serbia | hosts, placed 2nd in 2012 Division II B |
| Spain | placed 3rd in 2012 Division II B |
| Iceland | placed 4th in 2012 Division II B |
| Australia | placed 5th in 2012 Division II B |
| Belgium | placed 1st in 2012 Division III A and were promoted |

=== Final standings ===
| Pos | Team | Pld | W | OTW | OTL | L | GF | GA | GD | Pts | Promotion or relegation |
|---|---|---|---|---|---|---|---|---|---|---|---|
| 1 | Netherlands | 5 | 5 | 0 | 0 | 0 | 26 | 9 | +17 | 15 | Promoted to the 2014 Division II A |
| 2 | Spain | 5 | 4 | 0 | 0 | 1 | 22 | 10 | +12 | 12 | |
| 3 | Serbia | 5 | 3 | 0 | 0 | 2 | 18 | 8 | +10 | 9 | |
| 4 | Belgium | 5 | 2 | 0 | 0 | 3 | 15 | 14 | +1 | 6 | |
| 5 | Iceland | 5 | 1 | 0 | 0 | 4 | 8 | 20 | −12 | 3 | |
| 6 | Australia | 5 | 0 | 0 | 0 | 5 | 3 | 31 | −28 | 0 | Relegated to the 2014 Division III A |

Source: IIHF

=== Results ===
All times are local. (Central European Time – UTC+1)

| 9 March 2013; 13:00 | Belgium | 3–1 (1–0, 1–0, 1–1) | Iceland | Ice Rink Pionir, Belgrade |

Game reference

| 9 March 2013; 16:30 | Spain | 2–6 (1–2, 1–3, 0–1) | Netherlands | Ice Rink Pionir, Belgrade |

Game reference

| 9 March 2013; 20:30 | Serbia | 8–0 (1–0, 3–0, 4–0) | Australia | Ice Rink Pionir, Belgrade |

Game reference

| 10 March 2013; 13:00 | Netherlands | 4–2 (1–1, 0–0, 3–1) | Iceland | Ice Rink Pionir, Belgrade |

Game reference

| 10 March 2013; 16:30 | Australia | 0–7 (0–3, 0–2, 0–2) | Belgium | Ice Rink Pionir, Belgrade |

Game reference

| 10 March 2013; 20:00 | Serbia | 2–3 (0–0, 1–2, 1–1) | Spain | Ice Rink Pionir, Belgrade |

Game reference

| 12 March 2013; 13:00 | Netherlands | 7–1 (2–0, 3–1, 2–0) | Australia | Ice Rink Pionir, Belgrade |

Game reference

| 12 March 2013; 16:30 | Spain | 7–0 (3–0, 2–0, 2–0) | Iceland | Ice Rink Pionir, Belgrade |

Game reference

| 12 March 2013; 20:00 | Serbia | 2–1 (1–0, 1–0, 0–1) | Belgium | Ice Rink Pionir, Belgrade |

Game reference

| 13 March 2013; 13:00 | Australia | 0–4 (0–2, 0–0, 0–2) | Spain | Ice Rink Pionir, Belgrade |

Game reference

| 13 March 2013; 16:30 | Belgium | 2–5 (0–2, 2–1, 0–2) | Netherlands | Ice Rink Pionir, Belgrade |

Game reference

| 13 March 2013; 20:00 | Iceland | 0–4 (0–0, 0–1, 0–3) | Serbia | Ice Rink Pionir, Belgrade |

Game reference

| 15 March 2013; 13:00 | Spain | 6–2 (0–0, 4–0, 2–2) | Belgium | Ice Rink Pionir, Belgrade |

Game reference

| 15 March 2013; 16:30 | Iceland | 5–2 (0–1, 0–0, 5–1) | Australia | Ice Rink Pionir, Belgrade |

Game reference

| 15 March 2013; 20:00 | Netherlands | 4–2 (2–1, 2–1, 0–0) | Serbia | Ice Rink Pionir, Belgrade |

Game reference
