= Song Dong-hwan =

South Korean ice hockey player (born 1980)

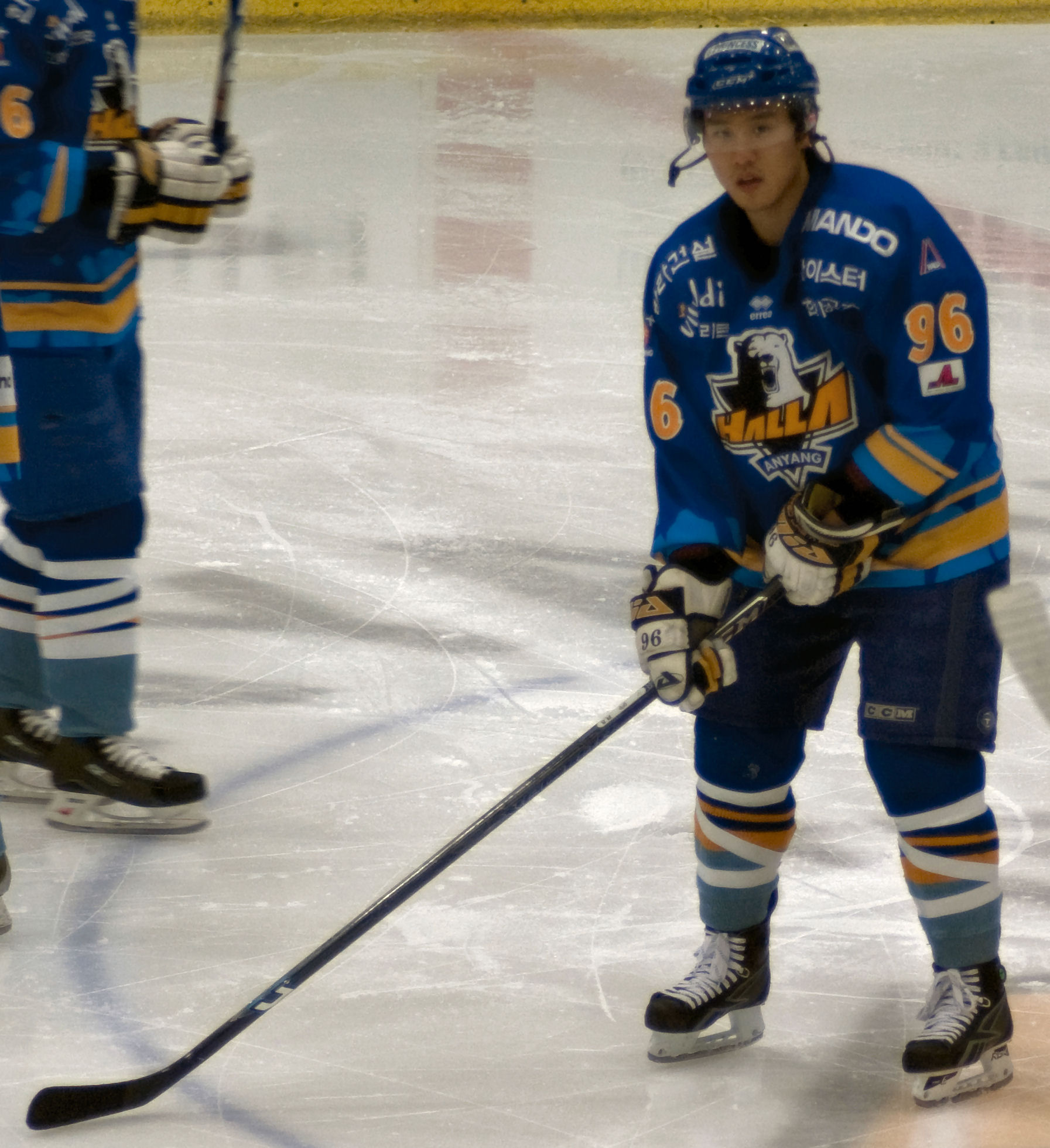
- Born: March 9, 1980 (age 45) Seoul, South Korea
- Height: 5 ft 10 in (178 cm)
- Weight: 182 lb (83 kg; 13 st 0 lb)
- Position: Right wing
- Shot: Right
- Played for: Anyang Halla; Nikko Icebucks; High1
- National team: South Korea
- Playing career: 2002–2016

Medal record

Representing South Korea

Men's Ice hockey

Asian Games
Bronze medal – third place	2011 Astana-Almaty	Team

- Song Dong-hwan
- Hangul: 송동환
- Hanja: 宋東桓
- RR: Song Donghwan
- MR: Song Tonghwan

Song Dong-hwan (Korean: 송동환; born February 4, 1980, in Seoul, South Korea) is a retired professional ice hockey player. Nicknamed "Asian Rocket", he won the scoring title with 31 goals in the 2005-2006 regular season for Asia League Ice Hockey. Song was the first Korean player to do so. Song spent his entire professional career in Asia League Ice Hockey.

Song was originally drafted by 'Dong-Won Dreams' (the club operation folded in 1998 from IMF Asia crises) 1st overall. He won the Rookie of the year trophy, Best6, 10-10 club. After the Dong-Won Dreams closed their operation, he signed with Anyang Halla in 2003, where he played 3 seasons from 2003 to 2006 before taking a leave of absence from hockey to serve his 2-year mandatory service in the South Korean military. Song returned to hockey in 2008 to play for Anyang Halla for another 3 seasons. Song played a lone season for the Japanese team Nikko Icebucks in 2011-12 before playing his final 4 seasons for Japanese team High1 from 2012 through 2016.

He started playing hockey when he was grade 4, the former Korea University forward won the scoring title and was voted as MVP for 99-00' Korean League. He also led the team to the championship title for 01-02' season.

== Career highlights ==
During a 1998 junior international game against Thailand, Song scored a record 31 goals in Korea's 92-0 victory. This feat was commemorated by the Hockey Hall of Fame in Toronto, where his game jersey was displayed.

99-00' season MVP, Point leader

01-02' Won the Championship title with Korea University

02-03' signed with Dong Won Club, MVP, Best 6

03-04' Signed with Anyang Halla, played in Asia League All Star game (4 Goals), MVP

05-06' 38 games, 31G 31A 62 pts

2006 won the AL scoring

== Career statistics ==
			Regular Season					Playoffs
Season	Team	League	GP	G	A	Pts	PIM	GP	G	A	Pts	PIM
1998–99	Korea University	KL	14	18	10	28	-	-	-	-	-	-
1999-00	Korea University	KL	14	22	4	26	-	--	--	--	--	--
2000-01	Korea University	KL	12	12	9	21	-	--	--	--	--	--
2001-02	Korea University	KL	14	14	3	17	-	-	-	-	-	-
2002-03	Dong Won	KL	14	11	10	21	-	-	-	-	-	-
2003-04	Anyang Halla	ALH	16	10	7	17	4	-	-	-	-	-
2004-05	Anyang Halla	ALH	42	16	17	33	28	-	-	-	-	-
2005-06	Anyang Halla	ALH	38	31	31	62	28	4	2	0	2	2
2008-09	Anyang Halla	ALH	35	19	26	45	38	7	4	1	5	10
2009-10	Anyang Halla	ALH	36	19	17	36	41	8	2	3	5	2
2010-11	Anyang Halla	ALH	27	5	12	17	14	3	0	2	2	2
2011-12	Nikko Icebucks	ALH	36	17	28	45	8	9	2	5	7	4
2012-13	High1	ALH	37	21	53	74	8	-	-	-	-	-
2013-14	High1	ALH	42	14	35	49	10	3	1	1	2	0
ALH Totals			309	152	226	378	163	31	9	12	21	18
