= IIHF Asian Oceanic U18 Championships =

International ice hockey competition

IIHF Asian Oceanic U18 Championship
- Formerly: IIHF Asian Oceanic Junior U18 Championships
- Sport: Ice hockey
- Founded: 1984
- First season: 1984
- Folded: 2002
- Country: Asia and Oceania
- Most titles: Japan (10)
- Related competitions: IIHF World U18 Championship

The IIHF Asian Oceanic U18 Championship was an annual event held by the International Ice Hockey Federation (IIHF) each at the start of every year for national under-18 ice hockey teams from Asia and Oceania. The Championships first held in 1984 and was played every year until 2002 where the competition ceased as teams were integrated into the World U18 Championships.

== History ==
The inaugural IIHF Asian Oceania U18 Championship, known then as the IIHF Asian Oceanic Junior U18 Championships, was held in Kushiro and Tomakomai, Japan between March 23 to March 30, 1984. Japan then went on to win the 1985 and 1986 tournament. In 1987 the competition was expanded to five teams with the addition of North Korea who won in their debut season. Tsutomu Kawabuchi was a key organizer of the inaugural event. Four countries competed – Japan, China, South Korea and Australia, with Japan winning the tournament after being undefeated in their six games.

In 1991 the first non-Asian or Oceanic team joined the competition. Mexico played only in the 1991 tournament and finished last after losing all four of their games. 1993 saw Kazakhstan join the competition, who went on to win after winning all four of their games. New Zealand was also scheduled to join for the 1993 tournament but instead withdrew. In 1997 Kazakhstan played in their last tournament with the following year the country pulling out to play in the IIHF European U18 Championships.

The following year New Zealand and Thailand made their debut in the tournament finishing fifth and sixth respectively, with Thailand's 92–0 loss to South Korea being the worst defeat in an IIHF event. In 1999 the Championship was expanded into two separate divisions with the winner of Division I gaining promotion to the World U18 Championships Pool B and the winner of Division II being promoted to Division I. 1999 also saw the debut of Chinese Taipei and the second non-Asian or Oceanic team, South Africa.

In 2000 Mongolia joined the competitions Division II tournament which New Zealand won to gain promotion to next years Division I and North Korea won the Division I tournament and gained promotion to the World U18 Championships Division I. The 2001 tournament was renamed the IIHF Asian Oceania U18 Championship, dropping the "junior" part from the name. South Korea won in the Division I tournament and was promoted to Division III of the World U18 Championships. Mongolia won the Division II tournament but no teams were promoted as the following year the Championships were shrunk back down to a single championship. The 2002 tournament was held in New Zealand and was the last IIHF Asian Oceania U18 Championship held with all competing teams offered a spot in the World U18 Championships Division III. China won the last tournament after winning all five of their games.

== Results ==
=== Division I ===
| # | Year | (gold) Gold | (silver) Silver | (bronze) Bronze | Host city (cities) | Host country |
|---|---|---|---|---|---|---|
| 1 | 1984 | Japan | China | South Korea | Kushiro and Tomakomai | Japan |
| 2 | 1985 | Japan | South Korea | Australia | Seoul | South Korea |
| 3 | 1986 | Japan | China | South Korea | Adelaide | Australia |
| 4 | 1987 | North Korea | China | Japan | Jilin | China |
| 5 | 1988 | China | Japan | South Korea | Bendigo | Australia |
| 6 | 1989 | Japan | South Korea | China | Hachinohe | Japan |
| 7 | 1990 | Japan | China | South Korea | Seoul | South Korea |
| 8 | 1991 | Japan | China | North Korea | Jilin | China |
| 9 | 1992 | Japan | North Korea | China | Harutori | Japan |
| 10 | 1993 | Kazakhstan | Japan | South Korea | Seoul | South Korea |
| 11 | 1994 | Kazakhstan | South Korea | Japan | Beijing | China |
| 12 | 1995 | Japan | Kazakhstan | China | Obihiro | Japan |
| 13 | 1996 | Kazakhstan | South Korea | Japan | Ust-Kamenogorsk | Kazakhstan |
| 14 | 1997 | Japan | Kazakhstan | South Korea | Seoul | South Korea |
| 15 | 1998 | South Korea | Japan | China | Harbin | China |
| 16 | 1999 | Japan | South Korea | China | Nikko | Japan |
| 17 | 2000 | North Korea | South Korea | China | Changchun City | China |
| 18 | 2001 | South Korea | China | Australia | Seoul | South Korea |
| 19 | 2002 | China | Australia | New Zealand | Auckland | New Zealand |

=== Division II ===
| # | Year | (gold) Gold | (silver) Silver | (bronze) Bronze | Host city (cities) | Host country |
|---|---|---|---|---|---|---|
| 1 | 1999 | North Korea | South Africa | New Zealand | Pyongyang | North Korea |
| 2 | 2000 | New Zealand | Chinese Taipei | Thailand | Bangkok | Thailand |
| 3 | 2001 | Mongolia | Chinese Taipei | Thailand | Seoul | South Korea |

== Summary (1984-2002) ==
| Rank | Team | Part | M | W | D | L | GF | GA | GD | Points |
|---|---|---|---|---|---|---|---|---|---|---|
| 1 | Japan | 16 | 69 | 55 | 6 | 8 | 781 | 153 | +628 | 171 |
| 2 | China | 18 | 76 | 39 | 5 | 32 | 545 | 312 | +233 | 122 |
| 3 | South Korea | 18 | 75 | 31 | 4 | 40 | 557 | 409 | +148 | 97 |
| 4 | Kazakhstan | 5 | 17 | 15 | 0 | 2 | 216 | 32 | +184 | 45 |
| 5 | North Korea | 5 | 18 | 14 | 1 | 3 | 143 | 32 | +111 | 43 |
| 6 | Australia | 14 | 63 | 9 | 2 | 52 | 207 | 849 | –642 | 29 |
| 7 | New Zealand | 5 | 19 | 7 | 1 | 11 | 104 | 209 | –105 | 22 |
| 8 | Mongolia | 3 | 10 | 4 | 1 | 5 | 48 | 65 | –17 | 13 |
| 9 | Chinese Taipei | 4 | 13 | 4 | 1 | 8 | 33 | 154 | –121 | 13 |
| 10 | South Africa | 1 | 3 | 2 | 0 | 1 | 38 | 10 | +28 | 6 |
| 11 | Thailand | 4 | 15 | 0 | 1 | 14 | 19 | 351 | –332 | 1 |
| 12 | Mexico | 1 | 4 | 0 | 0 | 4 | 3 | 115 | –112 | 0 |

== Medals (1984-2002) ==
This table only includes medals won by the countries in the top division (known as Division I from 1999 to 2001). It excludes all medals won in the Division II tournaments.

| Rank | Nation | Gold | Silver | Bronze | Total |
|---|---|---|---|---|---|
| 1 | Japan | 10 | 3 | 3 | 16 |
| 2 | Kazakhstan | 3 | 2 | 0 | 5 |
| 3 | China | 2 | 6 | 6 | 14 |
| 3 | South Korea | 2 | 6 | 6 | 14 |
| 5 | North Korea | 2 | 1 | 1 | 4 |
| 6 | Australia | 0 | 1 | 2 | 3 |
| 7 | New Zealand | 0 | 0 | 1 | 1 |
| Totals (7 entries) | | 19 | 19 | 19 | 57 |

== Nations ==
=== Japan ===
| # | Year | W | D | L | GF | GA | GD |
|---|---|---|---|---|---|---|---|
| 1 | 1984 | 6 | 0 | 0 | 64 | 9 | +55 |
| 2 | 1985 | 4 | 0 | 0 | 34 | 8 | +26 |
| 3 | 1986 | 5 | 0 | 1 | 68 | 14 | +54 |
| 4 | 1987 | 3 | 0 | 1 | 22 | 8 | +14 |
| 5 | 1988 | 4 | 1 | 1 | 59 | 19 | +40 |
| 6 | 1989 | 3 | 1 | 0 | 32 | 14 | +18 |
| 7 | 1990 | 6 | 0 | 0 | 86 | 4 | +82 |
| 8 | 1991 | 3 | 1 | 0 | 62 | 6 | +56 |
| 9 | 1992 | 3 | 1 | 0 | 36 | 3 | +33 |
| 10 | 1993 | 3 | 0 | 1 | 65 | 9 | +56 |
| 11 | 1994 | 2 | 1 | 1 | 42 | 23 | +19 |
| 12 | 1995 | 2 | 0 | 1 | 14 | 7 | +7 |
| 13 | 1996 | 1 | 0 | 2 | 11 | 13 | -2 |
| 14 | 1997 | 3 | 0 | 0 | 20 | 8 | +12 |
| 15 | 1998 | 4 | 1 | 0 | 130 | 3 | +127 |
| 16 | 1999 | 3 | 0 | 0 | 36 | 5 | +31 |
| 17 | 2000 | DNE | | | | | |
| 18 | 2001 | DNE | | | | | |
| 19 | 2002 | DNE | | | | | |

=== China ===
| # | Year | W | D | L | GF | GA | GD |
|---|---|---|---|---|---|---|---|
| 1 | 1984 | 4 | 0 | 2 | 48 | 24 | +24 |
| 2 | 1985 | DNE | | | | | |
| 3 | 1986 | 4 | 1 | 1 | 25 | 26 | -1 |
| 4 | 1987 | 3 | 0 | 1 | 17 | 9 | +8 |
| 5 | 1988 | 5 | 1 | 0 | 50 | 13 | +37 |
| 6 | 1989 | 0 | 1 | 3 | 16 | 27 | -11 |
| 7 | 1990 | 4 | 0 | 2 | 48 | 19 | +29 |
| 8 | 1991 | 3 | 1 | 0 | 49 | 11 | +38 |
| 9 | 1992 | 2 | 0 | 2 | 20 | 16 | +4 |
| 10 | 1993 | 1 | 0 | 3 | 26 | 27 | -1 |
| 11 | 1994 | 1 | 0 | 3 | 26 | 20 | +6 |
| 12 | 1995 | 1 | 0 | 2 | 6 | 16 | -10 |
| 13 | 1996 | 0 | 0 | 3 | 4 | 25 | -21 |
| 14 | 1997 | 0 | 0 | 3 | 7 | 26 | -19 |
| 15 | 1998 | 3 | 0 | 2 | 69 | 12 | +57 |
| 16 | 1999 | 1 | 0 | 2 | 15 | 19 | -4 |
| 17 | 2000 | 1 | 0 | 2 | 13 | 9 | +4 |
| 18 | 2001 | 1 | 1 | 1 | 26 | 8 | +18 |
| 19 | 2002 | 5 | 0 | 0 | 80 | 5 | +75 |

=== South Korea ===
| # | Year | W | D | L | GF | GA | GD |
|---|---|---|---|---|---|---|---|
| 1 | 1984 | 2 | 0 | 4 | 22 | 43 | -21 |
| 2 | 1985 | 1 | 1 | 2 | 23 | 23 | 0 |
| 3 | 1986 | 1 | 1 | 4 | 15 | 43 | -28 |
| 4 | 1987 | 0 | 0 | 4 | 9 | 32 | -23 |
| 5 | 1988 | 2 | 0 | 4 | 42 | 53 | -11 |
| 6 | 1989 | 2 | 0 | 2 | 19 | 26 | -7 |
| 7 | 1990 | 2 | 0 | 4 | 42 | 35 | +7 |
| 8 | 1991 | 1 | 0 | 3 | 31 | 20 | +11 |
| 9 | 1992 | 1 | 0 | 3 | 12 | 25 | -13 |
| 10 | 1993 | 2 | 0 | 2 | 31 | 24 | +7 |
| 11 | 1994 | 2 | 1 | 1 | 42 | 16 | +26 |
| 12 | 1995 | 1 | 0 | 2 | 12 | 14 | -2 |
| 13 | 1996 | 2 | 0 | 1 | 13 | 14 | -1 |
| 14 | 1997 | 1 | 0 | 2 | 18 | 15 | +3 |
| 15 | 1998 | 4 | 1 | 0 | 148 | 4 | +144 |
| 16 | 1999 | 2 | 0 | 1 | 24 | 11 | +13 |
| 17 | 2000 | 2 | 0 | 1 | 15 | 7 | +8 |
| 18 | 2001 | 3 | 0 | 0 | 39 | 4 | +35 |
| 19 | 2002 | DNE | | | | | |

=== Australia ===
| # | Year | W | D | L | GF | GA | GD |
|---|---|---|---|---|---|---|---|
| 1 | 1984 | 0 | 0 | 6 | 9 | 67 | -58 |
| 2 | 1985 | 0 | 1 | 3 | 6 | 32 | -26 |
| 3 | 1986 | 1 | 0 | 5 | 18 | 40 | -22 |
| 4 | 1987 | 1 | 0 | 3 | 14 | 35 | -21 |
| 5 | 1988 | 0 | 0 | 6 | 14 | 80 | -66 |
| 6 | 1989 | DNE | | | | | |
| 7 | 1990 | 0 | 0 | 6 | 5 | 123 | -118 |
| 8 | 1991 | DNE | | | | | |
| 9 | 1992 | 0 | 0 | 4 | 11 | 51 | -40 |
| 10 | 1993 | 0 | 0 | 4 | 1 | 151 | -150 |
| 11 | 1994 | 0 | 0 | 4 | 0 | 114 | -114 |
| 12 | 1995 | DNE | | | | | |
| 13 | 1996 | DNE | | | | | |
| 14 | 1997 | DNE | | | | | |
| 15 | 1998 | 2 | 0 | 3 | 42 | 60 | -18 |
| 16 | 1999 | 0 | 0 | 3 | 0 | 40 | -40 |
| 17 | 2000 | 0 | 0 | 3 | 2 | 27 | -25 |
| 18 | 2001 | 1 | 1 | 1 | 11 | 16 | -5 |
| 19 | 2002 | 4 | 0 | 1 | 74 | 13 | +61 |

=== North Korea ===
| # | Year | W | D | L | GF | GA | GD |
|---|---|---|---|---|---|---|---|
| X | 1984-1986 | DNE | | | | | |
| 1 | 1987 | 3 | 0 | 1 | 31 | 9 | +22 |
| X | 1988-1990 | DNE | | | | | |
| 2 | 1991 | 2 | 0 | 2 | 18 | 11 | +7 |
| 3 | 1992 | 3 | 1 | 0 | 22 | 6 | +16 |
| X | 1993-1998 | DNE | | | | | |
| 4 | 1999 | 3 | 0 | 0 | 56 | 3 | +53 |
| 5 | 2000 | 3 | 0 | 0 | 16 | 3 | +13 |
| X | 2001-2002 | DNE | | | | | |

=== Mexico ===
1991 IIHF Asian Oceanic Junior U18 Championship

=== South Africa ===
1999 IIHF Asian Oceanic Junior U18 Championship

=== Kazakhstan ===
| # | Year | W | D | L | GF | GA | GD |
|---|---|---|---|---|---|---|---|
| X | 1984-1992 | DNE | | | | | |
| 10 | 1993 | 4 | 0 | 0 | 88 | 0 | +88 |
| 11 | 1994 | 4 | 0 | 0 | 66 | 3 | +63 |
| 12 | 1995 | 2 | 0 | 1 | 15 | 10 | +5 |
| 13 | 1996 | 3 | 0 | 0 | 32 | 8 | +24 |
| 14 | 1997 | 2 | 0 | 1 | 15 | 11 | +4 |
| X | 1998-2002 | DNE | | | | | |

=== Thailand ===
| # | Year | W | D | L | GF | GA | GD |
|---|---|---|---|---|---|---|---|
| X | 1984-1997 | DNE | | | | | |
| 15 | 1998 | 0 | 0 | 5 | 3 | 217 | -214 |
| X | 1999 | DNE | | | | | |
| 17 | 2000 | 0 | 1 | 2 | 7 | 14 | -7 |
| 18 | 2001 | 0 | 0 | 2 | 2 | 15 | -13 |
| 19 | 2002 | 0 | 0 | 5 | 7 | 105 | -98 |

=== New Zealand ===
| # | Year | W | D | L | GF | GA | GD |
|---|---|---|---|---|---|---|---|
| X | 1984-1997 | DNE | | | | | |
| 15 | 1998 | 1 | 0 | 4 | 14 | 110 | -96 |
| 16 | 1999 | 1 | 0 | 2 | 20 | 27 | -7 |
| 17 | 2000 | 2 | 1 | 0 | 15 | 6 | +9 |
| 18 | 2001 | 0 | 0 | 3 | 4 | 52 | -48 |
| 19 | 2002 | 3 | 0 | 2 | 51 | 14 | +37 |

=== Chinese Taipei ===
| # | Year | W | D | L | GF | GA | GD |
|---|---|---|---|---|---|---|---|
| X | 1984-1998 | DNE | | | | | |
| 16 | 1999 | 0 | 0 | 3 | 4 | 78 | -74 |
| 17 | 2000 | 2 | 1 | 0 | 12 | 6 | +6 |
| 18 | 2001 | 1 | 0 | 1 | 6 | 11 | -5 |
| 19 | 2002 | 1 | 0 | 4 | 11 | 59 | -48 |

=== Mongolia ===
| # | Year | W | D | L | GF | GA | GD |
|---|---|---|---|---|---|---|---|
| X | 1984-1999 | DNE | | | | | |
| 17 | 2000 | 0 | 1 | 2 | 7 | 15 | -8 |
| 18 | 2001 | 2 | 0 | 0 | 22 | 4 | +18 |
| 19 | 2002 | 2 | 0 | 3 | 19 | 46 | -27 |

== See also ==
- IIHF World U18 Championship
- IIHF Asia and Oceania Championship
- 2012 IIHF U18 Challenge Cup of Asia
