= Kazakhstan men's national under-18 ice hockey team =

The Kazakhstan men's national under-18 ice hockey team is the men's national under-18 ice hockey team of Kazakhstan. The team is controlled by the Kazakhstan Ice Hockey Federation, a member of the International Ice Hockey Federation. The team represents Kazakhstan at the IIHF World U18 Championships. At the IIHF Asian Oceanic U18 Championships, the team won three gold and two silver medals in five appearances.

== International competitions ==
=== IIHF Asian Oceanic U18 Championships ===
- 1993: (gold) 1st place
- 1994: (gold) 1st place
- 1995: (silver) 2nd place
- 1996: (gold) 1st place
- 1997: (silver) 2nd place

=== IIHF European Junior Championships ===
- 1998: (gold) 1st place in group D

=== IIHF World U18 Championships ===
- 1999: 5th in Division I Europe
- 2000: 1st in Division I Europe
- 2001: 5th in Division I
- 2002: 1st in Division I
- 2003: 10th place
- 2004: 4th in Division I Group B
- 2005: 3rd in Division I Group A
- 2006: 3rd in Division I Group A
- 2007: 3rd in Division I Group A
- 2008: 2nd in Division I Group A
- 2009: 4th in Division I Group A
- 2010: 4th in Division I Group B
- 2011: 3rd in Division I Group A
- 2012: 2nd in Division IB
- 2013: 1st in Division IB
- 2014: 3rd in Division IA
- 2015: 5th in Division IA
- 2016: 3rd in Division IA
- 2017: 2nd in Division IA
- 2018: 4th in Division IA
- 2019: 2nd in Division IA
- 2020: Cancelled due to the COVID-19 pandemic
- 2021: Cancelled due to the COVID-19 pandemic
- 2022: 4th in Division IA
- 2023: 1st in Division IA
- 2024: 10th place
- 2025: 3rd in Division IA
