= North Korea men's national under-18 ice hockey team =

National U18 ice hockey team representing North Korea

- Association: Ice Hockey Association of the DPR Korea
- IIHF code: PRK

The North Korea men's national under-18 ice hockey team is the men's national under-18 ice hockey team of North Korea. The team is controlled by the Ice Hockey Association of the DPR Korea, a member of the International Ice Hockey Federation. The team represents North Korea at the IIHF World U18 Championships. At the IIHF Asian Oceanic U18 Championships, the team won two gold, one silver, and one bronze medal.

== International competitions ==
=== IIHF Asian Oceanic U18 Championships ===
- 1987: (gold) 1st place
- 1991: (bronze) 3rd place
- 1992: (silver) 2nd place
- 1999: 1st in Division II
- 2000: (gold) 1st place

=== IIHF World U18 Championships ===
- 2001: 8th in Division I
