= Australia men's national under-18 ice hockey team =

Australia
- Association: Ice Hockey Australia
- General manager: Paul Kelly
- Head coach: Stephen Laforet
- Assistants: Brent Laver
- Captain: Declan Bronte
- Team colors
- IIHF code: AUS

Biggest win
- Australia 38 – 1 Thailand (Auckland, New Zealand; 14 March 2002)

Biggest defeat
- Kazakhstan 57 – 0 Australia (Seoul, South Korea; March 1993)

IIHF World U18 Championship
- Appearances: 14 (first in 2003)
- Best result: 27th (in 2018)

IIHF Asian Oceanic U18 Championships
- Appearances: 14 (first in 1984)
- Best result: (2002)

The Australia men's national under-18 ice hockey team is controlled by Ice Hockey Australia and represents Australia in international under-18 ice hockey competitions. Australia plays in Division IIB of the IIHF World U18 Championships.

== History ==
In 1984 Australia first competed in the inaugural IIHF Asian Oceanic Junior U18 Championships held in Kushiro and Tomakomai, Japan. Australia lost all six of their games being beaten by Japan, China and South Korea. Australia continued to compete in the annual IIHF Asian Oceanic Junior U18 Championships missing only the 1989, 1991, 1995, 1996 and 1997 tournaments. In 2002 Australia competed in the final edition of the Championships which was being discontinued in favour of teams being offered a place in Division III of the IIHF World U18 Championships.

In 2003 Australia competed in their first World Championships. Playing in Division III Group A Australia finished on top of the group and gained promotion to Division II for 2004. The 2004 World Championship saw Australia relegated back to Division III after finishing last in Division II Group B. In the 2005 tournament Australia again gained promotion back to Division II after winning all five of their games.

Australia improved in the 2006 Championship finishing third in their group and staying in Division II for the 2007 tournament. In 2007 Australia finished fifth in their group, avoiding relegating after finishing above Serbia with four points. At the 2008 World Championship Australia lost all five of their games in Division II Group A and were relegated back to Division III. In 2009 Australia won all of its Division III games and gained promotion back to Division II for 2010. However Australia was again relegated back to Division III after finishing last in their group at the 2010 Division II Group B championship in Ukraine.

== Players and personnel ==
=== Current roster ===
For the 2024 IIHF World U18 Championship Division II Group B

#	Name	Pos	S/G	Age	Club
1	Marcus Henderson	G	L	20	Perth West Coast
2	Hugh Campbell	F	L	20	Queensland Southern Stars
3	Bryce Hodges	F	L	19	Queensland Southern Stars
4	Lachlan Sucher (C)	F	R	20	Crystal Beach Academy U18 AAA
5	Thomas Garas	F	R	19	Okanagan Hockey Academy
6	Tyler Colev	F	R	20	West Coast Flyers
7	Mac Tutton	D	R	20	Liverpool Saints
8	Tyrone Oxlade (A)	D	L	20	Liverpool Saints
9	Ruben Nalos	F	R	18	Boston Hockey Academy
10	Benjamin Warden	F	L	20	Queensland Southern Stars
11	David Quinn	D	R	20	Sydney Sabres
14	Jed Lake	F	L	19	Pacific Coast Academy Prep
15	Cody Reader	D	R	20	FEIA Falcons U18
16	Ivan Kuleshov	F	R	20	Lidingo Vikings
17	Jed Jameson	F	R	19	Queensland Southern Stars
18	Bodie Jerome	F	R	19	Yale Hockey Academy
19	Daniel Koudelka	D	L	20	Adelaide Red Wings
20	Justin Baxter	G	L	19	Liverpool Saints
21	Hunter Boland	D	R	19	Queensland Southern Stars
22	Luka Ouimette (A)	D	R	20	Brisbane Buccaneers
23	Jack Mollee	F	R	19	Queensland Southern Stars

=== Current team staff ===
For the 2024 IIHF World U18 Championship Division II Group B

- Head coach: David Ferrari
- Assistant coach: Marc Vaillancourt
- General Manager: Martin Ceniceros Alaniz
- Team Leader: Diane Doornbos
- Equipment Manager: Cameron Laws
- Physiotherapist: Ebru Efe

== International competitions ==
=== IIHF Asian Oceanic U18 championships ===
- 1984 – 4th place
- 1985 – (bronze) 3rd place
- 1986 – 4th place
- 1987 – 4th place
- 1988 – 4th place
- 1989 – Did not participate
- 1990 – 4th place
- 1991 – Did not participate
- 1992 – 4th place
- 1993 – 5th place
- 1994 – 5th place
- 1995–1997 – Did not participate
- 1998 – 4th place
- 1999 – 4th place, failed to qualify for IIHF World U18 Championship Pool B
- 2000 – 4th place, failed to qualify for IIHF World U18 Championship Division I
- 2001 – (bronze) 3rd place, failed to qualify for IIHF World U18 Championship Division III
- 2002 – (silver) 2nd place

=== IIHF World U18 championships ===
- 2000–2002 – Did not qualify
- 2003 – 35th (1st in Division III Group A. Promoted to Division II)
- 2004 – 34th (6th in Division II Group B. Relegated to Division III)
- 2005 – 35th (1st in Division III. Promoted to Division II)
- 2006 – 28th (3rd in Division II Group B)
- 2007 – 31st (5th in Division II Group B)
- 2008 – 33rd (6th in Division II Group A. Relegated to Division III)
- 2009 – 35th (1st in Division III Group A. Promoted to Division II)
- 2010 – 34th (6th in Division II Group B. Relegated to Division III)
- 2011 – 35th (1st in Division III Group A. Promoted to Division II)
- 2012 – 33rd (5th in Division II Group B)
- 2013 – 34th (6th in Division II Group B. Relegated to Division III)
- 2014 – 35th (1st in Division III Group A. Promoted to Division II)
- 2015 – 34th (6th in Division II Group B. Relegated to Division III)
- 2016 – 35th (1st in Division III Group A. Promoted to Division II Group B)
- 2017 – 29th (1st in Division II Group B. Promoted to Division II Group A)
- 2018 – 28th (6th in Division II Group A. Relegated to Division II Group B)
