= South Korea men's national under-18 ice hockey team =

Current logo used on the team jersey

The South Korea men's national under-18 ice hockey team is the men's national under-18 ice hockey team of South Korea. The team is controlled by the Korea Ice Hockey Association, a member of the International Ice Hockey Federation. The team represents South Korea at the IIHF World U18 Championships. South Korea won two gold, six silver, and six bronze medals at the IIHF Asian Oceanic U18 Championships.

The team holds the record of the largest victory in the sport. South Korea beat Thailand in the 1998 IIHF Asian Oceanic Junior U18 Championship 92–0.

== International competitions ==
=== IIHF Asian Oceanic U18 Championships ===
- 1984: (bronze) 3rd place
- 1985: (silver) 2nd place
- 1986: (bronze) 3rd place
- 1987: 5th place
- 1988: (bronze) 3rd place
- 1989: (silver) 2nd place
- 1990: (bronze) 3rd place
- 1991: 4th place
- 1992: 4th place
- 1993: (bronze) 3rd place
- 1994: (silver) 2nd place
- 1995: 4th place
- 1996: (silver) 2nd place
- 1997: (bronze) 3rd place
- 1998: (gold) 1st place
- 1999: (silver) 2nd place
- 2000: (silver) 2nd place
- 2001: (gold) 1st place
- 2002: Did not participate

=== IIHF World U18 Championships ===
- 1999: 2nd in Asia-Oceania Division I
- 2000: Did not compete
- 2001: Did not compete
- 2002: 1st in Division III
- 2003: 1st in Division II Group A
- 2004: 6th in Division I Group B
- 2005: 1st in Division II Group A
- 2006: 6th in Division I Group B
- 2007: 2nd in Division II Group B
- 2008: 2nd in Division II Group A
- 2009: 1st in Division II Group A
- 2010: 5th in Division I Group A
- 2011: 6th in Division I Group B
- 2012: 1st in Division IIA
- 2013: 6th in Division IB
- 2014: 2nd in Division IIA
- 2015: 1st in Division IIA
- 2016: 6th in Division IB
- 2017: 4th in Division IIA
- 2018: 4th in Division IIA
- 2019: 5th in Division IIA
- 2020: Cancelled due to the COVID-19 pandemic
- 2021: Cancelled due to the COVID-19 pandemic
- 2022: 1st in Division IIA
- 2023: 4th in Division IB
- 2024: 5th in Division IB
- 2025: 3rd in Division IB
