= Japan men's national under-18 ice hockey team =

The Japan men's national under-18 ice hockey team is controlled by the Japan Ice Hockey Federation, a member of the International Ice Hockey Federation. The team represents Japan at the IIHF World U18 Championships. Japan enjoyed great success at the now defunct IIHF Asian Oceanic U18 Championships, winning a total of 16 medals, including 10 golds.

== International competitions ==
=== IIHF Asian Oceanic U18 Championships ===
- 1984: (gold) 1st place
- 1985: (gold) 1st place
- 1986: (gold) 1st place
- 1987: (bronze) 3rd place
- 1988: (silver) 2nd place
- 1989: (gold) 1st place
- 1990: (gold) 1st place
- 1991: (gold) 1st place
- 1992: (gold) 1st place
- 1993: (silver) 2nd place
- 1994: (bronze) 3rd place
- 1995: (gold) 1st place
- 1996: (bronze) 3rd place
- 1997: (gold) 1st place
- 1998: (silver) 2nd place
- 1999: (gold) 1st place
- 2000-2002: Did not participate

=== IIHF World U18 Championships ===
- 1999: Qualified for Pool B
- 2000: 4th in Pool B
- 2001: 3rd in Division I
- 2002: 7th in Division I
- 2003: 5th in Division I Group A
- 2004: 2nd in Division I Group B
- 2005: 5th in Division I Group B
- 2006: 3rd in Division I Group B
- 2007: 2nd in Division I Group B
- 2008: 5th in Division I Group B
- 2009: 5th in Division I Group B
- 2010: 3rd in Division I Group A
- 2011: Did not participate
- 2012: 6th in Division I Group A
- 2013: 2nd in Division I Group B
- 2012: 6th in Division I Group A
- 2014: 4th in Division I Group B
- 2015: 3rd in Division I Group B
- 2016: 2nd in Division I Group B
- 2017: 3rd in Division I Group B
- 2018: 3rd in Division I Group B
- 2019: 1st in Division I Group B
- 2020: Cancelled due to the COVID-19 pandemic
- 2021: Cancelled due to the COVID-19 pandemic
- 2022: 6th in Division I Group A
- 2023: 3rd in Division I Group A
- 2024: 6th in Division I Group A
- 2025: 6th in Division I Group B
- 2026: 1st in Division I Group B (Promotions nullified due to reinstatement of Belarus)
