= China men's national under-18 ice hockey team =

Logo used on the team jersey

The China men's national under-18 ice hockey team is the men's national under-18 ice hockey team of China. The team is controlled by the Chinese Ice Hockey Association, a member of the International Ice Hockey Federation. The team represents China at the IIHF World U18 Championships. At the IIHF Asian Oceanic U18 Championships, the team won two gold, six silver, and six bronze medals.

== International competitions ==
=== IIHF Asian Oceanic U18 Championships ===
- 1984: (silver) 2nd place
- 1985: Did not participate
- 1986: (silver) 2nd place
- 1987: (silver) 2nd place
- 1988: (gold) 1st place
- 1989: (bronze) 3rd place
- 1990: (silver) 2nd place
- 1991: (silver) 2nd place
- 1992: (bronze) 3rd place
- 1993: 4th place
- 1994: 4th place
- 1995: (bronze) 3rd place
- 1996: 4th place
- 1997: 4th place
- 1998: (bronze) 3rd place
- 1999: (bronze) 3rd place
- 2000: (bronze) 3rd place
- 2001: (silver) 2nd place
- 2002: (gold) 1st place

=== IIHF World U18 Championships ===
- 2003: 3rd in Division III Group A
- 2004-2006 Did not participate
- 2007: 2nd in Division III
- 2008: 5th in Division II Group B
- 2009: 6th in Division II Group B
- 2010: 1st in Division III Group A
- 2011: 5th in Division II Group B
- 2012: 6th in Division II Group B
- 2013: 1st in Division III Group A
- 2014: 5th in Division II Group B
- 2015: 5th in Division II Group B
- 2016: 6th in Division II Group B
- 2017: 1st in Division III Group A
- 2018: 5th in Division II Group B
- 2019: 2nd in Division II Group B
- 2020:Cancelled due to the COVID-19 pandemic
- 2021:Cancelled due to the COVID-19 pandemic
- 2022: Withdrawn
- 2023: 2nd in Division II Group B
