= 2014 IIHF World U18 Championship Division II =

2014 IIHF U18 World Championship Division II

Tournament details
- Host countries: Great Britain; Estonia
- Venue(s): 2 (in 2 host cities)
- Dates: 24–30 March 2014; 13–19 April 2014
- Teams: 12

The 2014 IIHF U18 World Championship Division II was two international under-18 ice hockey tournaments organised by the International Ice Hockey Federation. The Division II A and Division II B tournaments represent the fourth and the fifth tier of the IIHF World U18 Championship.

== Division II A ==
The Division II A tournament was played in Dumfries, Great Britain, from 24 to 30 March 2014.

=== Participants ===
| Team | Qualification |
|---|---|
| South Korea | placed 6th in 2013 Division I B and were relegated |
| Croatia | placed 2nd in 2013 Division II A |
| Romania | placed 3rd in 2013 Division II A |
| Great Britain | hosts, placed 4th in 2013 Division II A |
| Lithuania | placed 5th in 2013 Division II A |
| Netherlands | placed 1st in 2013 Division II B and were promoted |

=== Final standings ===
| Pos | Team | Pld | W | OTW | OTL | L | GF | GA | GD | Pts | Promotion or relegation |
|---|---|---|---|---|---|---|---|---|---|---|---|
| 1 | Lithuania | 5 | 3 | 1 | 1 | 0 | 23 | 12 | +11 | 12 | Promoted to the 2015 Division I B |
| 2 | South Korea | 5 | 2 | 2 | 0 | 1 | 24 | 21 | +3 | 10 | |
| 3 | Croatia | 5 | 3 | 0 | 0 | 2 | 18 | 14 | +4 | 9 | |
| 4 | Netherlands | 5 | 2 | 0 | 0 | 3 | 12 | 17 | −5 | 6 | |
| 5 | Great Britain | 5 | 1 | 0 | 1 | 3 | 16 | 25 | −9 | 4 | |
| 6 | Romania | 5 | 1 | 0 | 1 | 3 | 15 | 19 | −4 | 4 | Relegated to the 2015 Division II B |

Source: IIHF

=== Results ===
All times are local. (Western European Time – UTC±0 / 30 March 2014: Western European Summer Time – UTC+1)

| 24 March 2014; 13:00 | Romania | 5–6 GWS (2–3, 1–1, 2–1) (OT: 0–0) (SO: 0–1) | South Korea | Dumfries Ice Bowl, Dumfries; Attendance: 280 |

Game reference

Attila Adorjan
Goalies
Seo Junyoung
Referee:
(Germany) Bastian Haupt
Linesmen:
(China) Liu Jia Qi
(Belarus) Alexander Matskevich

| 6:08 – (SH) R. Gyorgy (M. Sotir) | 1–0 |
| | 1–1 | S. Cho (C. Lee) (PP) – 8:13 |
| | 1–2 | J. Cho (J. Choi, B.G. Kim) – 10:17 |
| | 1–3 | S. Cho (H. Song, C. Lee) – 10:39 |
| 17:59 – R. Gyorgy (N. Rokaly, S. Rokaly) | 2–3 |
| | 2–4 | B.G. Kim (J. Cho) – 27:14 |
| 39:42 – I. Gereb (R. Gyorgy, E. Antal) | 3–4 |
| 49:47 – G. Barbu (M. Karda, T. Reszegh) | 4–4 |
| 50:22 – I. Gereb (I. Jugurica, R. Gyorgy) | 5–4 |
| | 5–5 | J.M. Lee (S. Cho, C. Lee) (PP) – 55:01 |

(miss) S. Rokaly
(miss) I. Gereb
Shootout
C. Lee (miss)
S. Cho
H. Song
12 min
Penalties
10 min
29
Shots
45

| 24 March 2014; 16:30 | Croatia | 0–4 (0–0, 0–3, 0–1) | Lithuania | Dumfries Ice Bowl, Dumfries; Attendance: 135 |

Game reference

Vilim Rosandic
Goalies
Artur Pavliukov
Referee:
(Spain) Alexei Roshchyn
Linesmen:
(Denmark) Thomas B. Andersen
(United Kingdom) James Kavanagh

| 0–1 | A. Laukaitis (I. Cetvertak, E. Sadauskas) – 21:17 |
| 0–2 | D. Cetvertak (E. Protcenko) – 25:34 |
| 0–3 | E. Protcenko (D. Cetvertak) (PP) – 30:08 |
| 0–4 | E. Boroska (J. Jasinevicius, D. Bisturys) (PP) – 57:44 |

20 min
Penalties
0 min
13
Shots
34

| 24 March 2014; 20:00 | Netherlands | 6–4 (2–2, 0–1, 4–1) | Great Britain | Dumfries Ice Bowl, Dumfries; Attendance: 450 |

Game reference

Ruud Leeuwesteijn
Goalies
Jordan Hedley
Referee:
(Poland) Pawel Meszynski
Linesmen:
(Latvia) Jevgenijs Griskevics
(Russia) Alexander Sysuev

| 5:51 – W. Copier (J. Verkiel) | 1–0 |
| | 1–1 | L. Bonner (B. Richards) – 7:55 |
| | 1–2 | S. Duggan (I. Antonov) – 8:50 |
| 19:21 – (PP) G. van Nes (M. Hermens, J. Verkiel) | 2–2 |
| | 2–3 | S. Duggan (L. Hook, I. Antonov) – 24:07 |
| 49:19 – (PP2) G. Vogelaar (M. Hermens, G. van Nes) | 3–3 |
| 51:20 – (PP) G. Vogelaar (M. Hermens, G. van Nes) | 4–3 |
| | 4–4 | A. Forbes (O. Betteridge, I. Antonov) – 51:26 |
| 52:45 – G. van Nes (G. Vogelaar) | 5–4 |
| 59:02 – M. Hermens (G. van Nes) | 6–4 |

10 min
Penalties
24 min
42
Shots
30

| 25 March 2014; 13:00 | Croatia | 5–4 (3–0, 1–1, 1–3) | Romania | Dumfries Ice Bowl, Dumfries; Attendance: 310 |

Game reference

Vilim Rosandic
Goalies
Attila Adorjan
Referee:
(Belgium) Chris Deweerdt
Linesmen:
(Denmark) Thomas B. Andersen
(Russia) Alexander Sysuev

| 13:28 – (SH) L. Jarcov | 1–0 |
| 14:23 – R. Platuzic | 2–0 |
| 19:16 – (PP) M. Milicic (R. Platuzic) | 3–0 |
| 32:10 – R. Platuzic (M. Milicic, L. Jarcov) | 4–0 |
| | 4–1 | F. Creanga – 34:08 |
| | 4–2 | I. Gereb (R. Gyorgy – 44:15 |
| | 4–3 | S. Rokaly – 46:17 |
| 47:28 – F. Gjoni (M. Martinic) | 5–3 |
| | 5–4 | I. Gereb (R. Gyorgy) – 49:12 |

10 min
Penalties
8 min
32
Shots
30

| 25 March 2014; 16:30 | Lithuania | 3–1 (2–1, 1–0, 0–0) | Netherlands | Dumfries Ice Bowl, Dumfries; Attendance: 175 |

Game reference

Artur Pavliukov
Goalies
Bart van Gorp
Referee:
(Germany) Bastian Haupt
Linesmen:
(United Kingdom) Ally Flockhart
(China) Liu Jia Qi

| | 0–1 | G. van Nes (G. Vogelaar, M. Hermens) – 00:53 |
| 2:25 – I. Cetvertak (D. Cetvertak) | 1–1 |
| 12:53 – A. Laukaitis (I. Cetvertak, J. Jasinevicius) | 2–1 |
| 22:33 – (SH) A. Laukaitis (I. Cetvertak) | 3–1 |

8 min
Penalties
12 min
32
Shots
19

| 25 March 2014; 20:00 | South Korea | 6–5 (0–1, 4–2, 2–2) | Great Britain | Dumfries Ice Bowl, Dumfries; Attendance: 370 |

Game reference

Kim Dong Hyun
Goalies
Jordan Hedley
Referee:
(Spain) Alexei Roshchyn
Linesmen:
(Latvia) Jevgenijs Griskevics
(Belarus) Alexander Matskevich

| | 0–1 | A. Forbes (S. Duggan) – 1:29 |
| 23:44 – JM Lee (C. Lee) | 1–1 |
| 27:35 – W. Choi (JS Kim, Y. Kim) | 2–1 |
| | 2–2 | B. Richards (L. Bonner) – 28:01 |
| 29:13 – (PP) C. Lee (S. Cho, JM Lee) | 3–2 |
| 35:47 – H. Jeong (BG Kim) | 4–2 |
| | 4–3 | S. Duggan – 36:39 |
| 50:41 – (PP) S. Cho (C. Lee) | 5–3 |
| 53:02 – J. Cho (BG Kim) | 6–3 |
| | 6–4 | I. Antonov (O. Betteridge, H. Stead) – 57:46 |
| | 6–5 | I. Antonov (A. Forbes) (PP) – 59:40 |

36 min
Penalties
8 min
21
Shots
27

| 27 March 2014; 13:00 | Croatia | 4–1 (2–0, 0–0, 2–1) | Netherlands | Dumfries Ice Bowl, Dumfries; Attendance: 360 |

Game reference

Ivan Ruzic
Goalies
Ruud Leeuwesteijn
Referee:
(Poland) Pawel Meszynski
Linesmen:
(United Kingdom) Ally Flockhart
(Latvia) Jevgenijs Griskevics

| 14:04 – (PP) T. Stancic (M. Buljanovic, M. Pavicevic) | 1–0 |
| 17:38 – M. Buljanovic (M. Plesko) | 2–0 |
| | 2–1 | G. van Nes (M. Hermens, J. Beeren) – 48:38 |
| 59:25 – (PP) (ENG) B. Kegalj (R. Platuzic) | 3–1 |
| 59:41 – (ENG) M. Pavicevic | 4–1 |

10 min
Penalties
12 min
27
Shots
38

| 27 March 2014; 16:30 | South Korea | 6–5 GWS (2–2, 3–2, 0–1) (OT: 0–0) (SO: 2–1) | Lithuania | Dumfries Ice Bowl, Dumfries; Attendance: 120 |

Game reference

Seo Junyoung
Goalies
Artur Pavliukov
Referee:
(Spain) Alexei Roshchyn
Linesmen:
(United Kingdom) James Kavanagh
(Russia) Alexander Sysuev

| 3:53 – (PP) W. Choi (Y. Kim) | 1–0 |
| | 1–1 | N. Marcinkevicius (E. Boroska, D. Bisturys) – 6:48 |
| 7:34 – C. Lee (IG Oh, S. Cho) | 2–1 |
| | 2–2 | D. Cetvertak (A. Gaidauskas, D. Cypas) (PP) – 18:21 |
| 24:47 – (PP) H. Song (C. Lee, J. Choi) | 3–2 |
| 28:52 – G. Lee (Y. Kim) | 4–2 |
| | 4–3 | D. Cetvertak (A. Laukaitis) – 28:59 |
| 30:25 – (PP) Y. Kim (H. Song, W. Choi) | 5–3 |
| | 5–4 | D. Vitte (E. Sadauskas, D. Bogdziul) – 35:31 |
| | 5–5 | D. Vitte (D. Cetvertak) (EA) – 59:39 |

(miss) C. Lee
S. Cho
(miss) H. Song
(miss) H. Song
C. Lee
Shootout
E. Protcenko
A. Laukaitis (miss)
D. Vitte (miss)
E. Protcenko (miss)
D. Cetvertak (miss)
8 min
Penalties
22 min
33
Shots
35

| 27 March 2014; 20:00 | Romania | 1–2 (0–1, 0–0, 1–1) | Great Britain | Dumfries Ice Bowl, Dumfries; Attendance: 408 |

Game reference

Attila Adorjan
Goalies
Denis Bell-Blake
Referee:
(Belgium) Chris Deweerdt
Linesmen:
(Denmark) Thomas B. Andersen
(China) Liu Jia Qi

| | 0–1 | S. Duggan (A. Forbes, L. Hook) (PP2) – 13:42 |
| | 0–2 | A. Forbes (O. Betteridge) (PP) – 53:33 |
| 57:33 – N. Rokaly (T. Reszegh) | 1–2 |

18 min
Penalties
32 min
35
Shots
46

| 29 March 2014; 13:00 | Netherlands | 4–2 (1–0, 3–0, 0–2) | South Korea | Dumfries Ice Bowl, Dumfries; Attendance: 120 |

Game reference

Bart van Gorp
Goalies
Kim Dong Hyun
Referee:
(Belgium) Chris Deweerdt
Linesmen:
(Denmark) Thomas B. Andersen
(United Kingdom) James Kavanagh

| 13:07 – (SH) M. Hermens (G. van Nes) | 1–0 |
| 24:50 – G. van Nes (M. Hermens) | 2–0 |
| 30:22 – (PP) G. van Nes (M. Hermens) | 3–0 |
| 34:55 – L. Kluijtmans (J. Evers) | 4–0 |
| | 4–1 | C. Lee (S. Cho) – 44:44 |
| | 4–2 | H. Song (S. Cho, C. Lee) (PP) – 48:54 |

14 min
Penalties
67 min
23
Shots
22

| 29 March 2014; 16:30 | Lithuania | 6–1 (2–0, 0–0, 4–1) | Romania | Dumfries Ice Bowl, Dumfries; Attendance: 105 |

Game reference

Artur Pavliukov
Goalies
Attila Adorjan
Referee:
(Poland) Pawel Meszynski
Linesmen:
(United Kingdom) Ally Flockhart
(Latvia) Jevgenijs Griskevics

| 5:20 – A. Laukaitis (D. Cetvertak, K. Gusevas) | 1–0 |
| 11:47 – A. Laukaitis (D. Cetvertak) | 2–0 |
| 41:09 – (PP) A. Gaidauskas (D. Vitte, E. Sadauskas) | 3–0 |
| 42:44 – D. Bisturys (E. Boroska) | 4–0 |
| 44:13 – E. Sadauskas (D. Vitte) | 5–0 |
| 52:28 – D. Vitte (D. Bogdziul, E. Sadauskas) | 6–0 |
| | 6–1 | R. Gyorgy (N. Rokaly, T. Gyorfy) (PP) – 54:25 |

14 min
Penalties
10 min
35
Shots
28

| 29 March 2014; 20:00 | Great Britain | 1–7 (0–2, 0–4, 1–1) | Croatia | Dumfries Ice Bowl, Dumfries; Attendance: 437 |

Game reference

Denis Bell-Blake
Goalies
Vilim Rosandic
Referee:
(Germany) Bastian Haupt
Linesmen:
(Belarus) Alexander Matskevich
(Russia) Alexander Sysuev

| | 0–1 | M. Pavicevic – 16:49 |
| | 0–2 | M. Milicic (M. Plesko, L. Jarcov) – 18:36 |
| | 0–3 | F. Gjoni (B. Kegalj, L. Jarcov) (PP) – 23:48 |
| | 0–4 | K. Krnic (T. Stancic) – 24:16 |
| | 0–5 | M. Pavicevic (T. Stancic, F. Gjoni) – 26:28 |
| | 0–6 | R. Platuzic (F. Gjoni) – 35:45 |
| | 0–7 | M. Milicic (T. Boric, L. Jarcov) (PP2) – 48:54 |
| 59:42 – (PP) W. Attwell (I. Antonov, O. Betteridge) | 1–7 |

10 min
Penalties
22 min
42
Shots
25

| 30 March 2014; 13:00 | Romania | 4–0 (1–0, 0–0, 3–0) | Netherlands | Dumfries Ice Bowl, Dumfries; Attendance: 111 |

Game reference

Attila Adorjan
Goalies
Bart van Gorp
Referee:
(Spain) Alexei Roshchyn
Linesmen:
(United Kingdom) James Kavanagh
(Belarus) Alexander Matskevich

| 18:11 – (PP) R. Gyorgy (N. Rokaly, S. Rokaly) | 1–0 |
| 44:44 – S. Rokaly (N. Rokaly, T. Gyorfy) | 2–0 |
| 55:49 – N. Rokaly (T. Reszegh, S. Rokaly) | 3–0 |
| 56:54 – I. Gereb (M. Sotir, R. Gyorgy) | 4–0 |

6 min
Penalties
20 min
14
Shots
35

| 30 March 2014; 16:30 | South Korea | 4–2 (1–1, 1–1, 2–0) | Croatia | Dumfries Ice Bowl, Dumfries; Attendance: 106 |

Game reference

Kim Dong Hyun
Goalies
Vilim Rosandic
Referee:
(Poland) Pawel Meszynski
Linesmen:
(United Kingdom) Ally Flockhart
(China) Liu Jia Qi

| | 0–1 | M. Milicic (R. Platuzic) – 11:49 |
| 14:34 – Kim Y. (Cho J., 26:18 – Kim B.G.) | 1–1 |
| Kim Y. (Cho J., Kim B.G.) | 2–1 |
| | 2–2 | F. Gjoni (B. Kegalj, M. Milicic) (PP) – 30:16 |
| 41:35 – Song H. (Oh I.-G.) | 3–2 |
| 59:30 – (EN) Song H. | 4–2 |

8 min
Penalties
8 min
36
Shots
25

| 30 March 2014; 20:00 | Great Britain | 4–5 GWS (0–2, 3–2, 1–0) (OT: 0–0) (SO: 0–1) | Lithuania | Dumfries Ice Bowl, Dumfries; Attendance: 543 |

Game reference

Jordan Hedley
Goalies
Artur Pavliukov
Referee:
(Germany) Bastian Haupt
Linesmen:
(Denmark) Thomas B. Andersen
(Russia) Alexander Sysuev

| | 0–1 | D. Bogdziul (E. Sadauskas, D. Vitte) – 3:35 |
| | 0–2 | A. Laukaitis (E. Protcenko, I. Cetvertak) (PP) – 16:45 |
| 21:46 – I. Antonov (S. Duggan, H. Stead) | 1–2 |
| 22:14 – (PP) S. Duggan (A. Forbes, L. Hook) | 2–2 |
| 28:12 – A. Forbes (O. Betteridge, L. Hook) | 3–2 |
| | 3–3 | A. Laukaitis (E. Protcenko, D. Cetvertak) (PP) – 31:41 |
| | 3–4 | A. Laukaitis (D. Cetvertak) – 33:53 |
| 51:21 – L. Johnson (C. Buglass) | 4–4 |

I. Antonov
S. Duggan
A. Forbes
Shootout
D. Skadauskas
P. Zhukauskas
12 min
Penalties
2 min
29
Shots
18

== Division II B ==
The Division II B tournament was played in Tallinn, Estonia, from 14 to 20 April 2014.

=== Participants ===
| Team | Qualification |
|---|---|
| Estonia | hosts, placed 6th in 2013 Division II A and were relegated |
| Spain | placed 2nd in 2013 Division II B |
| Serbia | placed 3rd in 2013 Division II B |
| Belgium | placed 4th in 2013 Division II B |
| Iceland | placed 5th in 2013 Division II B |
| China | placed 1st in 2013 Division III A and were promoted |

=== Final standings ===
| Pos | Team | Pld | W | OTW | OTL | L | GF | GA | GD | Pts | Promotion or relegation |
|---|---|---|---|---|---|---|---|---|---|---|---|
| 1 | Estonia | 5 | 4 | 0 | 0 | 1 | 30 | 13 | +17 | 12 | Promoted to the 2015 Division II A |
| 2 | Spain | 5 | 4 | 0 | 0 | 1 | 25 | 11 | +14 | 12 | |
| 3 | Serbia | 5 | 4 | 0 | 0 | 1 | 31 | 9 | +22 | 12 | |
| 4 | Belgium | 5 | 1 | 1 | 0 | 3 | 17 | 31 | −14 | 5 | |
| 5 | China | 5 | 1 | 0 | 1 | 3 | 16 | 21 | −5 | 4 | |
| 6 | Iceland | 5 | 0 | 0 | 0 | 5 | 8 | 42 | −34 | 0 | Relegated to the 2015 Division III A |

Source: IIHF

=== Results ===
All times are local. (Eastern European Summer Time – UTC+3)

| 14 April 2014; 13:00 | China | 3–4 GWS (1–1, 0–0, 2–2) (OT: 0–0) (SO: 0–1) | Belgium | Škoda Ice Rink, Tallinn; Attendance: 55 |

Game reference

| 14 April 2014; 16:30 | Spain | 10–1 (2–1, 6–0, 2–0) | Iceland | Škoda Ice Rink, Tallinn; Attendance: 72 |

Game reference

| 14 April 2014; 20:00 | Estonia | 3–4 (1–1, 1–3, 1–0) | Serbia | Škoda Ice Rink, Tallinn; Attendance: 185 |

Game reference

| 15 April 2014; 13:00 | Iceland | 3–10 (0–6, 1–1, 2–3) | China | Škoda Ice Rink, Tallinn; Attendance: 50 |

Game reference

| 15 April 2014; 16:30 | Spain | 4–1 (1–0, 2–1, 1–0) | Serbia | Škoda Ice Rink, Tallinn; Attendance: 235 |

Game reference

| 15 April 2014; 20:00 | Estonia | 11–4 (2–0, 5–2, 4–2) | Belgium | Škoda Ice Rink, Tallinn; Attendance: 275 |

Game reference

| 17 April 2014; 13:00 | Spain | 6–1 (1–0, 2–0, 3–1) | China | Škoda Ice Rink, Tallinn; Attendance: 57 |

Game reference

| 17 April 2014; 16:30 | Serbia | 11–2 (2–1, 6–1, 3–0) | Belgium | Škoda Ice Rink, Tallinn; Attendance: 75 |

Game reference

| 17 April 2014; 20:00 | Estonia | 6–2 (2–1, 1–0, 3–1) | Iceland | Škoda Ice Rink, Tallinn; Attendance: 257 |

Game reference

| 19 April 2014; 13:00 | Belgium | 2–4 (1–1, 0–1, 1–2) | Spain | Škoda Ice Rink, Tallinn; Attendance: 75 |

Game reference

| 19 April 2014; 16:30 | Iceland | 0–11 (0–2, 0–4, 0–5) | Serbia | Škoda Ice Rink, Tallinn; Attendance: 81 |

Game reference

| 19 April 2014; 20:00 | China | 2–4 (1–0, 0–1, 1–3) | Estonia | Škoda Ice Rink, Tallinn; Attendance: 350 |

Game reference

| 20 April 2014; 13:00 | Belgium | 5–2 (0–0, 1–2, 4–0) | Iceland | Škoda Ice Rink, Tallinn; Attendance: 120 |

Game reference

| 20 April 2014; 16:30 | Serbia | 4–0 (2–0, 1–0, 1–0) | China | Škoda Ice Rink, Tallinn; Attendance: 147 |

Game reference

| 20 April 2014; 20:00 | Estonia | 6–1 (1–0, 4–1, 1–0) | Spain | Škoda Ice Rink, Tallinn; Attendance: 527 |

Game reference
