= 2017 IIHF World U18 Championship Division II =

2017 IIHF U18 World Championship Division II

Tournament details
- Host countries: South Korea; Serbia
- Venue(s): 3 (in 2 host cities)
- Dates: 2–8 April 2017; 13–19 March 2017
- Teams: 12

The 2017 IIHF U18 World Championship Division II was two international under-18 ice hockey tournaments organised by the International Ice Hockey Federation. The Division II A and Division II B tournaments represent the fourth and the fifth tier of the IIHF World U18 Championship.

== Division II A ==
2017 IIHF World U18 Championship Division II A
Tournament details
- Host country: South Korea
- Venue(s): 2 (in 1 host city)
- Dates: 2–8 April
- Teams: 6

Tournament statistics
- Games played: 15
- Goals scored: 92 (6.13 per game)
- Attendance: 11,184 (746 per game)
- Scoring leader(s): (Romania) Andrei Vasile (10 points)

Official website
- IIHF.com

The Division II A tournament was played in Gangneung, South Korea, from 2 to 8 April 2017.

=== Participants ===
Team	Qualification
South Korea	hosts; placed 6th in 2016 Division I B and were relegated
Romania	placed 2nd in 2016 Division II A
Lithuania	placed 3rd in 2016 Division II A
Great Britain	placed 4th in 2016 Division II A
Croatia	placed 5th in 2016 Division II A
Estonia	placed 1st in 2016 Division II B and were promoted

=== Match officials ===
4 referees and 7 linesmen were selected for the tournament.

Referees

- (Denmark) Daniel Bøjle
- (Serbia) Djordje Fazekaš
- (Finland) Joonas Kova
- (Japan) Shinichi Takizawa

Linesmen

- (France) Clément Goncalves
- (Poland) Paweł Kosidło
- (China) Tiange Liu
- (Switzerland) David Obwegeser
- (Belarus) Mikita Paliakou
- (Germany) Tobias Schwenk
- (Austria) Maximilian Verworner

=== Standings ===
Pos	Team	Pld	W	OTW	OTL	L	GF	GA	GD	Pts	Promotion or relegation
1	Romania	5	4	0	1	0	20	8	+12	13	Promoted to the 2018 Division I B
2	Estonia	5	1	3	0	1	17	16	+1	9	
3	Lithuania	5	2	1	0	2	15	12	+3	8	
4	South Korea (H)	5	2	0	1	2	13	13	0	7 (Note: South Korea 3–2 Great Britain)	
5	Great Britain	5	2	0	1	2	18	17	+1	7	
6	Croatia	5	0	0	1	4	9	26	−17	1	Relegated to the 2018 Division II B

Source: IIHF
Rules for classification: 1) points; 2) head-to-head points; 3) head-to-head goal difference; 4) head-to-head number of goals scored; 5) result against closest best-ranked team outside tied teams; 6) result against second-best-ranked team outside tied teams; 7) seeding before tournament.
(H) Host

=== Results ===
All times are local. (Korea Standard Time – UTC+9)

2 April 2017; 12:00	Lithuania	4–2 (1–0, 2–1, 1–1)	South Korea	Kwandong Hockey Center, Gangneung; Attendance: 1,243

Game reference
16 min	Penalties	24 min
28	Shots	41

2 April 2017; 16:30	Romania	7–1 (2–0, 3–1, 2–0)	Croatia	Gangneung Hockey Centre, Gangneung; Attendance: 174

Game reference
2 min	Penalties	6 min
38	Shots	14

2 April 2017; 21:00	Estonia	6–5 GWS (2–3, 3–0, 0–2); OT: (0–0); SO: (1–0)	Great Britain	Gangneung Hockey Centre, Gangneung; Attendance: 215

Game reference
8 min	Penalties	8 min
41	Shots	27

4 April 2017; 12:00	Croatia	3–4 OT (2–1, 1–1, 0–1); OT: (0–1)	Estonia	Kwandong Hockey Center, Gangneung; Attendance: 1,306

Game reference
12 min	Penalties	20 min
17	Shots	40

4 April 2017; 16:30	Romania	3–4 OT (2–2, 0–0, 1–1); OT: (0–1)	Lithuania	Gangneung Hockey Centre, Gangneung; Attendance: 138

Game reference
18 min	Penalties	10 min
21	Shots	44

4 April 2017; 21:00	South Korea	3–2 (1–1, 1–0, 1–1)	Great Britain	Gangneung Hockey Centre, Gangneung; Attendance: 956

Game reference
51 min	Penalties	8 min
27	Shots	30

5 April 2017; 12:00	Romania	4–0 (0–0, 3–0, 1–0)	Estonia	Gangneung Hockey Centre, Gangneung; Attendance: 1,329

Game reference
14 min	Penalties	24 min
24	Shots	33

5 April 2017; 16:30	Lithuania	1–3 (0–0, 0–2, 1–1)	Great Britain	Kwandong Hockey Center, Gangneung; Attendance: 297

Game reference
16 min	Penalties	37 min
25	Shots	38

5 April 2017; 21:00	South Korea	4–1 (1–0, 1–0, 2–1)	Croatia	Gangneung Hockey Centre, Gangneung; Attendance: 424

Game reference
8 min	Penalties	6 min
40	Shots	27

7 April 2017; 12:00	Great Britain	2–4 (0–3, 1–0, 1–1)	Romania	Gangneung Hockey Centre, Gangneung; Attendance: 2,058

Game reference
6 min	Penalties	14 min
46	Shots	18

7 April 2017; 16:30	Croatia	1–5 (0–5, 1–0, 0–0)	Lithuania	Gangneung Hockey Centre, Gangneung; Attendance: 100

Game reference
6 min	Penalties	8 min
19	Shots	27

7 April 2017; 21:00	Estonia	4–3 OT (0–1, 2–0, 1–2); OT: (1–0)	South Korea	Kwandong Hockey Center, Gangneung; Attendance: 1,143

Game reference
12 min	Penalties	14 min
37	Shots	37

8 April 2017; 12:00	Great Britain	6–3 (1–1, 1–1, 4–1)	Croatia	Gangneung Hockey Centre, Gangneung; Attendance: 245

Game reference
37 min	Penalties	16 min
28	Shots	22

8 April 2017; 16:30	Lithuania	1–3 (0–1, 1–1, 0–1)	Estonia	Gangneung Hockey Centre, Gangneung; Attendance: 321

Game reference
6 min	Penalties	10 min
31	Shots	24

8 April 2017; 21:00	South Korea	1–2 (1–1, 0–1, 0–0)	Romania	Gangneung Hockey Centre, Gangneung; Attendance: 1,235

Game reference
6 min	Penalties	8 min
33	Shots	28

== Division II B ==
2017 IIHF World U18 Championship Division II B
Tournament details
- Host country: Serbia
- Venue(s): 1 (in 1 host city)
- Dates: 13–19 March
- Teams: 6

Tournament statistics
- Games played: 15
- Goals scored: 88 (5.87 per game)
- Attendance: 3,729 (249 per game)
- Scoring leader(s): (Australia) Tyrone Bronte (12 points)

Official website
- IIHF.com

The Division II B tournament was played in Belgrade, Serbia, from 13 to 19 March 2017. Australia achieved the unusual distinction of being promoted in consecutive years.

=== Participants ===
Team	Qualification
Netherlands	placed 6th in 2016 Division II A and were relegated
Spain	placed 2nd in 2016 Division II B
Serbia	hosts; placed 3rd in 2016 Division II B
Iceland	placed 4th in 2016 Division II B
Belgium	placed 5th in 2016 Division II B
Australia	placed 1st in 2016 Division III A and were promoted

=== Match officials ===
4 referees and 7 linesmen were selected for the tournament.

Referees

- (Romania) Lehel Gergely
- (Slovakia) Milan Novák
- (Lithuania) Andrej Simankov
- (Slovakia) Miroslav Štolc

Linesmen

- (Turkey) Murat Aygun
- (Serbia) Tibor Fazekaš
- (Slovakia) Martin Jobbágy
- (Belarus) Artsiom Labzov
- (Norway) Thomas Nordberg Pettersen
- (Serbia) David Perduv
- (Ukraine) Anton Peretyatko

=== Standings ===
Pos	Team	Pld	W	OTW	OTL	L	GF	GA	GD	Pts	Promotion or relegation
1	Australia	5	4	0	0	1	19	7	+12	12 (Note: Spain 1–4 Australia)	Promoted to the 2018 Division II A
2	Spain	5	4	0	0	1	24	10	+14	12	
3	Serbia (H)	5	3	0	0	2	14	13	+1	9 (Note: Serbia 3–2 Netherlands)	
4	Netherlands	5	3	0	0	2	16	12	+4	9	
5	Iceland	5	1	0	0	4	8	23	−15	3	
6	Belgium	5	0	0	0	5	7	23	−16	0	Relegated to the 2018 Division III A

Source: IIHF
Rules for classification: 1) points; 2) head-to-head points; 3) head-to-head goal difference; 4) head-to-head number of goals scored; 5) result against closest best-ranked team outside tied teams; 6) result against second-best ranked team outside tied teams; 7) seeding before tournament.
(H) Host

=== Results ===
All times are local. (Central European Time – UTC+1)

13 March 2017; 13:00	Australia	5–2 (3–1, 2–1, 0–0)	Iceland	Ice Rink Pionir, Belgrade; Attendance: 48

Game reference
16 min	Penalties	22 min
37	Shots	20

13 March 2017; 16:30	Spain	7–1 (0–0, 2–1, 5–0)	Belgium	Ice Rink Pionir, Belgrade; Attendance: 32

Game reference
14 min	Penalties	14 min
42	Shots	18

13 March 2017; 20:30	Serbia	3–2 (0–0, 2–0, 1–2)	Netherlands	Ice Rink Pionir, Belgrade; Attendance: 723

Game reference
12 min	Penalties	18 min
30	Shots	22

14 March 2017; 13:00	Belgium	1–5 (0–2, 1–3, 0–0)	Australia	Ice Rink Pionir, Belgrade; Attendance: 53

Game reference
6 min	Penalties	4 min
15	Shots	34

14 March 2017; 16:30	Netherlands	5–1 (2–0, 0–0, 3–1)	Iceland	Ice Rink Pionir, Belgrade; Attendance: 42

Game reference
10 min	Penalties	0 min
27	Shots	22

14 March 2017; 20:00	Spain	4–3 (2–1, 1–2, 1–0)	Serbia	Ice Rink Pionir, Belgrade; Attendance: 639

Game reference
6 min	Penalties	6 min
35	Shots	21

16 March 2017; 13:00	Netherlands	5–2 (1–0, 1–0, 3–2)	Belgium	Ice Rink Pionir, Belgrade; Attendance: 29

Game reference
8 min	Penalties	16 min
33	Shots	25

16 March 2017; 16:30	Spain	1–4 (0–1, 0–1, 1–2)	Australia	Ice Rink Pionir, Belgrade; Attendance: 52

Game reference
8 min	Penalties	12 min
30	Shots	18

16 March 2017; 20:00	Serbia	4–2 (1–1, 1–0, 2–1)	Iceland	Ice Rink Pionir, Belgrade; Attendance: 409

Game reference
26 min	Penalties	40 min
22	Shots	17

18 March 2017; 13:00	Iceland	0–7 (0–1, 0–4, 0–2)	Spain	Ice Rink Pionir, Belgrade; Attendance: 36

Game reference
28 min	Penalties	12 min
13	Shots	70

18 March 2017; 16:30	Australia	1–2 (0–0, 0–1, 1–1)	Netherlands	Ice Rink Pionir, Belgrade; Attendance: 76

Game reference
6 min	Penalties	6 min
18	Shots	16

18 March 2017; 20:00	Belgium	1–3 (0–0, 0–2, 1–1)	Serbia	Ice Rink Pionir, Belgrade; Attendance: 523

Game reference
6 min	Penalties	4 min
21	Shots	28

19 March 2017; 13:00	Netherlands	2–5 (1–1, 0–0, 1–4)	Spain	Ice Rink Pionir, Belgrade; Attendance: 86

Game reference
16 min	Penalties	12 min
21	Shots	34

19 March 2017; 16:30	Iceland	3–2 (2–0, 1–1, 0–1)	Belgium	Ice Rink Pionir, Belgrade; Attendance: 47

Game reference
10 min	Penalties	12 min
31	Shots	39

19 March 2017; 20:00	Serbia	1–4 (1–0, 0–4, 0–0)	Australia	Ice Rink Pionir, Belgrade; Attendance: 934

Game reference
18 min	Penalties	43 min
21	Shots	32
