= 2016 IIHF World U18 Championship Division II =

2016 IIHF U18 World Championship Division II

Tournament details
- Host countries: Romania; Spain
- Venue(s): 2 (in 2 host cities)
- Dates: 4–10 April 2016; 26 March – 1 April 2016
- Teams: 12

The 2016 IIHF U18 World Championship Division II was two international under-18 ice hockey tournaments organised by the International Ice Hockey Federation. The Division II A and Division II B tournaments represent the fourth and the fifth tier of the IIHF World U18 Championship.

== Division II A ==
The Division II A tournament was played in Brașov, Romania, from 4 to 10 April 2016.

=== Participants ===
Team	Qualification
Lithuania	placed 6th in 2015 Division I B and were relegated
Poland	placed 2nd in 2015 Division II A
Great Britain	placed 3rd in 2015 Division II A
Netherlands	placed 4th in 2015 Division II A
Croatia	placed 5th in 2015 Division II A
Romania	hosts; placed 1st in 2015 Division II B and were promoted

=== Standings ===
Pos	Team	Pld	W	OTW	OTL	L	GF	GA	GD	Pts	Promotion or relegation
1	Poland	5	5	0	0	0	43	8	+35	15	Promoted to the 2017 Division I B
2	Romania	5	4	0	0	1	27	15	+12	12	
3	Lithuania	5	3	0	0	2	17	19	−2	9	
4	Great Britain	5	2	0	0	3	18	23	−5	6	
5	Croatia	5	1	0	0	4	8	25	−17	3	
6	Netherlands	5	0	0	0	5	6	29	−23	0	Relegated to the 2017 Division II B

Source: IIHF

=== Results ===
4 April 2016; 13:30	Poland	7–2 (1–1, 3–0, 3–1)	Croatia	Brașov Olympic Ice Rink, Brașov

Game reference

4 April 2016; 17:00	Great Britain	2–5 (0–2, 1–2, 1–1)	Lithuania	Brașov Olympic Ice Rink, Brașov

Game reference

4 April 2016; 20:30	Romania	8–1 (1–0, 4–0, 3–1)	Netherlands	Brașov Olympic Ice Rink, Brașov

Game reference

5 April 2016; 13:30	Croatia	1–7 (1–3, 0–2, 0–2)	Great Britain	Brașov Olympic Ice Rink, Brașov

Game reference

5 April 2016; 17:00	Netherlands	1–10 (0–5, 0–5, 1–0)	Poland	Brașov Olympic Ice Rink, Brașov

Game reference

5 April 2016; 20:30	Romania	6–1 (2–0, 2–0, 2–1)	Lithuania	Brașov Olympic Ice Rink, Brașov

Game reference

7 April 2016; 13:30	Great Britain	5–2 (1–1, 1–0, 3–1)	Netherlands	Brașov Olympic Ice Rink, Brașov

Game reference

7 April 2016; 17:00	Lithuania	6–3 (2–0, 4–1, 0–2)	Croatia	Brașov Olympic Ice Rink, Brașov

Game reference

7 April 2016; 20:30	Poland	10–3 (2–1, 5–0, 3–2)	Romania	Brașov Olympic Ice Rink, Brașov

Game reference

8 April 2016; 13:30	Lithuania	4–1 (2–0, 2–0, 0–1)	Netherlands	Brașov Olympic Ice Rink, Brașov

Game reference

8 April 2016; 17:00	Poland	9–1 (3–0, 1–1, 5–0)	Great Britain	Brașov Olympic Ice Rink, Brașov

Game reference

8 April 2016; 20:30	Croatia	0–4 (0–0, 0–2, 0–2)	Romania	Brașov Olympic Ice Rink, Brașov

Game reference

10 April 2016; 13:30	Lithuania	1–7 (0–4, 0–0, 1–3)	Poland	Brașov Olympic Ice Rink, Brașov

Game reference

10 April 2016; 17:00	Netherlands	1–2 (0–0, 0–1, 1–1)	Croatia	Brașov Olympic Ice Rink, Brașov

Game reference

10 April 2016; 20:30	Great Britain	3–6 (0–1, 2–4, 1–1)	Romania	Brașov Olympic Ice Rink, Brașov

Game reference

== Division II B ==
The Division II B tournament was played in Valdemoro, Spain, from 26 March to 1 April 2016.

=== Participants ===
Team	Qualification
Estonia	placed 6th in 2015 Division II A and were relegated
Spain	hosts; placed 2nd in 2015 Division II B
Serbia	placed 3rd in 2015 Division II B
Belgium	placed 4th in 2015 Division II B
China	placed 5th in 2015 Division II B
Iceland	placed 1st in 2015 Division III A and were promoted

=== Standings ===
Pos	Team	Pld	W	OTW	OTL	L	GF	GA	GD	Pts	Promotion or relegation
1	Estonia	5	5	0	0	0	38	11	+27	15	Promoted to the 2017 Division II A
2	Spain	5	4	0	0	1	26	14	+12	12	
3	Serbia	5	3	0	0	2	12	10	+2	9	
4	Iceland	5	1	0	0	4	11	30	−19	3	
5	Belgium	5	1	0	0	4	15	29	−14	3	
6	China	5	1	0	0	4	12	20	−8	3	Relegated to the 2017 Division III A

Source: IIHF

=== Results ===
26 March 2016; 13:00	Iceland	4–5 (2–1, 1–1, 1–3)	Belgium	Francisco Fernández Ochoa Ice Rink, Valdemoro

Game reference

26 March 2016; 16:30	Serbia	3–5 (0–1, 3–2, 0–2)	Estonia	Francisco Fernández Ochoa Ice Rink, Valdemoro

Game reference

26 March 2016; 20:00	Spain	7–2 (2–1, 2–1, 3–0)	China	Francisco Fernández Ochoa Ice Rink, Valdemoro

Game reference

27 March 2016; 13:00	Estonia	10–0 (2–0, 7–0, 1–0)	Belgium	Francisco Fernández Ochoa Ice Rink, Valdemoro

Game reference

27 March 2016; 16:30	China	3–5 (1–2, 1–0, 1–3)	Iceland	Francisco Fernández Ochoa Ice Rink, Valdemoro

Game reference

27 March 2016; 20:00	Spain	4–2 (2–0, 2–1, 0–1)	Serbia	Francisco Fernández Ochoa Ice Rink, Valdemoro

Game reference

29 March 2016; 13:00	Estonia	3–2 (1–0, 1–1, 1–1)	China	Francisco Fernández Ochoa Ice Rink, Valdemoro

Game reference

29 March 2016; 16:30	Serbia	2–1 (1–1, 1–0, 0–0)	Belgium	Francisco Fernández Ochoa Ice Rink, Valdemoro

Game reference

29 March 2016; 20:00	Spain	3–0 (1–0, 0–0, 2–0)	Iceland	Francisco Fernández Ochoa Ice Rink, Valdemoro

Game reference

31 March 2016; 13:00	China	0–1 (0–0, 0–1, 0–0)	Serbia	Francisco Fernández Ochoa Ice Rink, Valdemoro

Game reference

31 March 2016; 16:30	Iceland	2–15 (1–4, 1–4, 0–7)	Estonia	Francisco Fernández Ochoa Ice Rink, Valdemoro

Game reference

31 March 2016; 20:00	Belgium	5–8 (1–3, 2–2, 2–3)	Spain	Francisco Fernández Ochoa Ice Rink, Valdemoro

Game reference

1 April 2016; 13:00	Serbia	4–0 (0–0, 2–0, 2–0)	Iceland	Francisco Fernández Ochoa Ice Rink, Valdemoro

Game reference

1 April 2016; 16:30	Belgium	4–5 (2–0, 2–1, 0–4)	China	Francisco Fernández Ochoa Ice Rink, Valdemoro

Game reference

1 April 2016; 20:00	Estonia	5–4 (1–2, 2–0, 2–2)	Spain	Francisco Fernández Ochoa Ice Rink, Valdemoro

Game reference
