= 2023 IIHF World U18 Championship Division II =

2023 IIHF U18 World Championship Division II
Tournament details
- Host countries: Serbia; Bulgaria
- Dates: 9–15 April (Group A); 27 March – 2 April (Group B)
- Teams: 12

The 2023 IIHF U18 World Championship Division II were two international under-18 ice hockey tournaments organised by the International Ice Hockey Federation. The Division II A and Division II B tournaments represent the fourth and the fifth tier of the IIHF World U18 Championship.

== Division II A ==
2023 IIHF U18 World Championship Division II A

Tournament details
- Host country: Serbia
- Venue: 1 (in 1 host city)
- Dates: 9–15 April
- Teams: 6

Tournament statistics
- Games played: 15
- Goals scored: 100 (6.67 per game)
- Attendance: 3,417 (228 per game)
- Scoring leader: (Serbia) Minja Ivanović (9 points)

Official website
- www.iihf.com

The Division II A tournament was played in Belgrade, Serbia, from 9 to 15 April 2023.

=== Participants ===
Team	Qualification
Great Britain	Placed 3rd in 2022 Division II A
Lithuania	Placed 4th in 2022 Division II A
Romania	Placed 5th in 2022 Division II A
Serbia	Hosts; placed 6th in 2022 Division II A
Croatia	Placed 1st in 2022 Division II B and were promoted
Spain	Placed 2nd in 2022 Division II B and were promoted

=== Standings ===
Pos	Team	Pld	W	OTW	OTL	L	GF	GA	GD	Pts	Promotion or relegation
1	Lithuania	5	4	1	0	0	22	5	+17	14	Promoted to the 2024 Division I B
2	Croatia	5	4	0	0	1	28	9	+19	12	
3	Great Britain	5	2	1	1	1	14	16	−2	9	
4	Serbia (H)	5	1	0	1	3	15	24	−9	4 (Note: Serbia 6–3 Romania)	
5	Romania	5	1	0	1	3	11	29	−18	4	
6	Spain	5	0	1	0	4	10	17	−7	2	Relegated to the 2024 Division II B

Source: IIHF
Rules for classification: 1) points; 2) head-to-head points; 3) head-to-head goal difference; 4) head-to-head number of goals scored; 5) result against closest best-ranked team outside tied teams; 6) result against second-best ranked team outside tied teams; 7) seeding before tournament.
(H) Host

=== Results ===
9 April 2023; 13:00	Romania	3–4 OT (2–2, 0–1, 1–0); OT: (0–1)	Great Britain	Pionir Ice Hall, Belgrade; Attendance: 79

Game reference
10 min	Penalties	6 min
30	Shots	25

9 April 2023; 16:30	Spain	2–3 (1–0, 1–1, 0–2)	Croatia	Pionir Ice Hall, Belgrade; Attendance: 96

Game reference
14 min	Penalties	6 min
23	Shots	44

9 April 2023; 20:00	Lithuania	5–3 (2–0, 2–2, 1–1)	Serbia	Pionir Ice Hall, Belgrade; Attendance: 486

Game reference
18 min	Penalties	18 min
36	Shots	19

10 April 2023; 13:00	Great Britain	0–7 (0–0, 0–4, 0–3)	Croatia	Pionir Ice Hall, Belgrade; Attendance: 74

Game reference
16 min	Penalties	18 min
38	Shots	37

10 April 2023; 16:30	Lithuania	6–0 (4–0, 0–0, 2–0)	Romania	Pionir Ice Hall, Belgrade; Attendance: 53

Game reference
8 min	Penalties	12 min
43	Shots	17

10 April 2023; 20:00	Serbia	3–4 OT (0–1, 2–1, 1–1); OT: (0–1)	Spain	Pionir Ice Hall, Belgrade; Attendance: 526

Game reference
24 min	Penalties	28 min
31	Shots	39

12 April 2023; 13:00	Lithuania	5–0 (2–0, 2–0, 1–0)	Spain	Pionir Ice Hall, Belgrade; Attendance: 97

Game reference
14 min	Penalties	12 min
36	Shots	17

12 April 2023; 16:30	Romania	2–11 (1–4, 1–3, 0–4)	Croatia	Pionir Ice Hall, Belgrade; Attendance: 47

Game reference
26 min	Penalties	8 min
21	Shots	37

12 April 2023; 20:00	Great Britain	6–2 (1–1, 3–0, 2–1)	Serbia	Pionir Ice Hall, Belgrade; Attendance: 529

Game reference
10 min	Penalties	10 min
39	Shots	41

13 April 2023; 13:00	Croatia	1–4 (1–2, 0–0, 0–2)	Lithuania	Pionir Ice Hall, Belgrade; Attendance: 59

Game reference
4 min	Penalties	12 min
32	Shots	29

13 April 2023; 16:30	Spain	2–3 (1–1, 1–2, 0–0)	Great Britain	Pionir Ice Hall, Belgrade; Attendance: 74

Game reference
6 min	Penalties	16 min
42	Shots	26

13 April 2023; 20:00	Serbia	6–3 (1–2, 2–0, 3–1)	Romania	Pionir Ice Hall, Belgrade; Attendance: 578

Game reference
8 min	Penalties	12 min
27	Shots	31

15 April 2023; 13:00	Romania	3–2 (1–0, 0–1, 2–1)	Spain	Pionir Ice Hall, Belgrade; Attendance: 39

Game reference
10 min	Penalties	6 min
24	Shots	42

15 April 2023; 16:30	Great Britain	1–2 OT (0–1, 1–0, 0–0 (OT: 0–1)	Lithuania	Pionir Ice Hall, Belgrade; Attendance: 56

Game reference
10 min	Penalties	8 min
31	Shots	32

15 April 2023; 20:00	Croatia	6–1 (3–1, 1–0, 2–0)	Serbia	Pionir Ice Hall, Belgrade; Attendance: 624

Game reference
22 min	Penalties	45 min
38	Shots	19

== Division II B ==
2023 IIHF U18 World Championship Division II B

Tournament details
- Host country: Bulgaria
- Venue: 1 (in 1 host city)
- Dates: 27 March – 2 April
- Teams: 6

Tournament statistics
- Games played: 15
- Goals scored: 100 (6.67 per game)

Official website
- www.iihf.com

The Division II B tournament was played in Sofia, Bulgaria, from 27 March to 2 April 2023.

=== Participants ===
Team	Qualification
China	Placed 2nd in 2019 Division II B
Netherlands	Placed 3rd in 2022 Division II B
Bulgaria	Hosts; placed 4th in 2022 Division II B
Australia	Placed 5th in 2019 Division II B
Chinese Taipei	Placed 1st in 2022 Division III A and were promoted
Belgium	Placed 2nd in 2022 Division III A and were promoted

=== Standings ===
Pos	Team	Pld	W	OTW	OTL	L	GF	GA	GD	Pts	Promotion or relegation
1	Netherlands	5	5	0	0	0	26	7	+19	15	Promoted to the 2024 Division II A
2	China	5	4	0	0	1	26	12	+14	12	
3	Chinese Taipei	5	2	0	0	3	16	25	−9	6 (Note: Chinese Taipei 3 points, +1 GD; Bulgaria 3 points, 0 GD; Australia 3 points, –1 GD)	
4	Bulgaria (H)	5	2	0	0	3	12	16	−4	6	
5	Australia	5	2	0	0	3	12	20	−8	6	
6	Belgium	5	0	0	0	5	8	20	−12	0	Relegated to the 2024 Division III A

Source: IIHF
Rules for classification: 1) points; 2) head-to-head points; 3) head-to-head goal difference; 4) head-to-head number of goals scored; 5) result against closest best-ranked team outside tied teams; 6) result against second-best ranked team outside tied teams; 7) seeding before tournament.
(H) Host

=== Results ===
All times are local (UTC+2).

27 March 2023; 13:00	Australia	1–6 (0–3, 1–2, 0–1)	Netherlands	Winter Sports Palace, Sofia

Game reference

27 March 2023; 16:30	Belgium	3–4 (1–0, 0–3, 2–1)	Chinese Taipei	Winter Sports Palace, Sofia

Game reference

27 March 2023; 20:00	China	5–1 (2–0, 2–1, 1–0)	Bulgaria	Winter Sports Palace, Sofia

Game reference

28 March 2023; 13:00	Netherlands	8–1 (2–1, 4–0, 2–0)	Chinese Taipei	Winter Sports Palace, Sofia

Game reference

28 March 2023; 16:30	China	5–2 (1–1, 2–1, 2–0)	Australia	Winter Sports Palace, Sofia

Game reference

28 March 2023; 20:00	Bulgaria	4–0 (1–0, 0–0, 3–0)	Belgium	Winter Sports Palace, Sofia

Game reference

30 March 2023; 13:00	Australia	5–3 (1–1, 4–0, 0–2)	Chinese Taipei	Winter Sports Palace, Sofia

Game reference

30 March 2023; 16:30	China	6–2 (3–1, 1–1, 2–0)	Belgium	Winter Sports Palace, Sofia

Game reference

30 March 2023; 20:00	Netherlands	5–1 (1–0, 4–1, 0–0)	Bulgaria	Winter Sports Palace, Sofia

Game reference

1 April 2023; 13:00	Belgium	2–4 (2–0, 0–1, 0–3)	Netherlands	Winter Sports Palace, Sofia

Game reference

1 April 2023; 16:30	Bulgaria	5–2 (0–0, 0–1, 5–1)	Australia	Winter Sports Palace, Sofia

Game reference

1 April 2023; 20:00	Chinese Taipei	4–8 (2–2, 1–3, 1–3)	China	Winter Sports Palace, Sofia

Game reference

2 April 2023; 13:00	Australia	2–1 (1–0, 1–0, 0–1)	Belgium	Winter Sports Palace, Sofia

Game reference

2 April 2023; 16:30	Chinese Taipei	4–1 (2–0, 0–1, 2–0)	Bulgaria	Winter Sports Palace, Sofia

Game reference

2 April 2023; 20:00	Netherlands	3–2 (0–1, 1–1, 2–0)	China	Winter Sports Palace, Sofia

Game reference
