= 2015 IIHF World U18 Championship Division II =

2015 IIHF U18 World Championship Division II

Tournament details
- Host countries: Estonia; Serbia
- Venues: 2 (in 2 host cities)
- Dates: 22–28 March 2015; 16–22 March 2015
- Teams: 12

The 2015 IIHF U18 World Championship Division II was two international under-18 ice hockey tournaments organised by the International Ice Hockey Federation. The Division II A and Division II B tournaments represent the fourth and the fifth tier of the IIHF World U18 Championship.

== Division II A ==
The Division II A tournament was played in Tallinn, Estonia, from 22 to 28 March 2015.

=== Participants ===
Team	Qualification
Poland	Placed 6th in 2014 Division I B and were relegated
South Korea	Placed 2nd in 2014 Division II A
Croatia	Placed 3rd in 2014 Division II A
Netherlands	Placed 4th in 2014 Division II A
Great Britain	Placed 5th in 2014 Division II A
Estonia	Hosts, placed 1st in 2014 Division II B and were promoted

=== Standings ===
Pos	Team	Pld	W	OTW	OTL	L	GF	GA	GD	Pts	Promotion or relegation
1	South Korea	5	5	0	0	0	28	7	+21	15	Promoted to the 2016 Division I B
2	Poland	5	4	0	0	1	18	10	+8	12	
3	Great Britain	5	2	1	0	2	18	13	+5	8	
4	Netherlands	5	1	1	1	2	18	22	−4	6	
5	Croatia	5	1	0	0	4	9	24	−15	3	
6	Estonia	5	0	0	1	4	11	26	−15	1	Relegated to the 2016 Division II B

Source: IIHF

=== Results ===
All times are local. (Eastern European Time – UTC+2)

22 March 2015; 13:00	Croatia	1–2 (1–1, 0–1, 0–0)	Poland	Tondiraba Jäähall, Tallinn

Game reference

22 March 2015; 16:30	South Korea	4–2 (1–0, 2–0, 1–2)	Great Britain	Tondiraba Jäähall, Tallinn

Game reference

22 March 2015; 20:00	Estonia	4–5 OT (2–2, 1–0, 1–2, 0–1)	Netherlands	Tondiraba Jäähall, Tallinn

Game reference

23 March 2015; 13:00	South Korea	7–0 (2–0, 4–0, 1–0)	Croatia	Tondiraba Jäähall, Tallinn

Game reference

23 March 2015; 16:30	Poland	6–3 (0–1, 1–1, 5–1)	Netherlands	Tondiraba Jäähall, Tallinn

Game reference

23 March 2015; 20:00	Great Britain	4–1 (2–1, 1–0, 1–0)	Estonia	Tondiraba Jäähall, Tallinn

Game reference

25 March 2015; 13:00	Poland	4–1 (1–0, 0–1, 3–0)	Great Britain	Tondiraba Jäähall, Tallinn

Game reference

25 March 2015; 16:30	Croatia	2–4 (1–0, 0–0, 1–4)	Netherlands	Tondiraba Jäähall, Tallinn

Game reference

25 March 2015; 20:00	South Korea	7–1 (2–1, 5–0, 0–0)	Estonia	Tondiraba Jäähall, Tallinn

Game reference

27 March 2015; 13:00	Netherlands	3–6 (1–2, 0–3, 2–1)	South Korea	Tondiraba Jäähall, Tallinn

Game reference

27 March 2015; 16:30	Great Britain	7–1 (4–0, 2–1, 1–0)	Croatia	Tondiraba Jäähall, Tallinn

Game reference

27 March 2015; 20:00	Estonia	1–5 (0–1, 1–1, 0–3)	Poland	Tondiraba Jäähall, Tallinn

Game reference

28 March 2015; 13:00	Netherlands	3–4 GWS (1–1, 1–1, 1–1, 0–0, 0–1)	Great Britain	Tondiraba Jäähall, Tallinn

Game reference

28 March 2015; 16:30	Poland	1–4 (0–1, 1–2, 0–1)	South Korea	Tondiraba Jäähall, Tallinn

Game reference

28 March 2015; 20:00	Croatia	5–4 (2–1, 1–2, 2–1)	Estonia	Tondiraba Jäähall, Tallinn

Game reference

=== Statistics and awards ===
==== Scoring leaders ====
Pos	Player	Country	GP	G	A	Pts	+/−	PIM
1	Ahn Jaein	South Korea	5	6	3	9	+3	0
2	Guus van Nes	Netherlands	5	4	5	9	+3	0
3	Max Hermens	Netherlands	5	3	6	9	+4	12
4	Lee Je-hui	South Korea	5	2	5	7	+7	4
5	Lee Juhyung	South Korea	5	5	1	6	+7	6
6	Kim Byung-gun	South Korea	5	4	2	6	+3	2
6	Michael Stratford	Great Britain	5	4	2	6	+3	4
8	Luc Johnson	Great Britain	5	2	4	6	+2	14
9	Glenn Billing	Great Britain	5	3	2	5	+2	4
10	Mateusz Goscinski	Poland	5	2	3	5	+2	0
10	Pawel Gozdziewicz	Poland	5	2	3	5	+2	14
10	Luuk Lambregts	Netherlands	5	2	3	5	0	2
10	Park Hun	South Korea	5	2	3	5	+5	6
10	Renato Platuzic	Croatia	5	2	3	5	−1	0

GP = Games played; G = Goals; A = Assists; Pts = Points; +/− = P Plus–minus; PIM = Penalties In Minutes

Source: IIHF.com

==== Goaltending leaders ====
(minimum 40% team's total ice time)

Pos	Player	Country	TOI	GA	GAA	Sv%	SO
1	Shim Hyounseop	South Korea	240:00	4	1.00	96.08	1
2	Luka Valencic	Croatia	179:14	10	3.35	94.05	0
3	Denis Bell-Blake	Great Britain	184:48	8	2.60	91.75	0
4	Mateusz Studzinski	Poland	300:00	10	2.00	91.07	0
5	Ruud Leeuwesteijn	Netherlands	217:32	12	3.31	89.66	0

TOI = Time On Ice (minutes:seconds); GA = Goals against; GAA = Goals against average; Sv% = Save percentage; SO = Shutouts

Source: IIHF.com

==== IIHF best player awards ====
- Goaltender: (Croatia) Luka Valencic
- Defenceman: (Poland) Patryk Wsol
- Forward: (South Korea) Lee Juhyung

== Division II B ==
The Division II B tournament was played in Novi Sad, Serbia, from 16 to 22 March 2015.

=== Participants ===
Team	Qualification
Romania	Placed 6th in 2014 Division II A and were relegated
Spain	Placed 2nd in 2014 Division II B
Serbia	Hosts, placed 3rd in 2014 Division II B
Belgium	Placed 4th in 2014 Division II B
China	Placed 5th in 2014 Division II B
Australia	Placed 1st in 2014 Division III A and were promoted

=== Standings ===
Pos	Team	Pld	W	OTW	OTL	L	GF	GA	GD	Pts	Promotion or relegation
1	Romania	5	4	1	0	0	46	12	+34	14	Promoted to the 2016 Division II A
2	Spain	5	4	0	1	0	28	13	+15	13	
3	Serbia	5	3	0	0	2	21	13	+8	9	
4	Belgium	5	1	1	0	3	20	26	−6	5	
5	China	5	1	0	0	4	14	27	−13	3	
6	Australia	5	0	0	1	4	11	49	−38	1	Relegated to the 2016 Division III A

Source: IIHF

=== Results ===
All times are local. (Central European Time – UTC+1)

15 March 2015; 13:00	Australia	2–3 OT (1–0, 1–2, 0–0, 0–1)	Belgium	Ledena dvorana SPENS, Novi Sad

Game reference

15 March 2015; 16:30	Spain	3–1 (1–0, 2–1, 0–0)	China	Ledena dvorana SPENS, Novi Sad

Game reference

15 March 2015; 20:30	Serbia	3–4 (1–2, 2–0, 0–2)	Romania	Ledena dvorana SPENS, Novi Sad

Game reference

17 March 2015; 13:00	China	8–1 (3–0, 1–0, 4–1)	Australia	Ledena dvorana SPENS, Novi Sad

Game reference

17 March 2015; 16:30	Romania	10–1 (4–0, 3–0, 3–1)	Belgium	Ledena dvorana SPENS, Novi Sad

Game reference

17 March 2015; 20:00	Spain	2–0 (0–0, 1–0, 1–0)	Serbia	Ledena dvorana SPENS, Novi Sad

Game reference

19 March 2015; 13:00	Romania	10–2 (0–1, 5–1, 5–0)	China	Ledena dvorana SPENS, Novi Sad

Game reference

19 March 2015; 16:30	Spain	14–4 (4–1, 4–1, 6–2)	Australia	Ledena dvorana SPENS, Novi Sad

Game reference

19 March 2015; 20:00	Serbia	6–5 (3–0, 2–3, 1–2)	Belgium	Ledena dvorana SPENS, Novi Sad

Game reference

21 March 2015; 13:00	Belgium	4–6 (1–3, 0–1, 3–2)	Spain	Ledena dvorana SPENS, Novi Sad

Game reference

21 March 2015; 16:30	Australia	3–18 (1–9, 0–5, 2–4)	Romania	Ledena dvorana SPENS, Novi Sad

Game reference

21 March 2015; 20:00	China	1–6 (0–2, 1–2, 0–2)	Serbia	Ledena dvorana SPENS, Novi Sad

Game reference

23 March 2015; 13:00	Romania	4–3 OT (0–1, 1–0, 2–2, 1–0)	Spain	Ledena dvorana SPENS, Novi Sad

Game reference

23 March 2015; 16:30	Belgium	7–2 (4–0, 1–1, 2–1)	China	Ledena dvorana SPENS, Novi Sad

Game reference

23 March 2015; 20:00	Serbia	6–1 (0–0, 3–0, 3–1)	Australia	Ledena dvorana SPENS, Novi Sad

Game reference

=== Statistics and awards ===
==== Scoring leaders ====
Pos	Player	Country	GP	G	A	Pts	+/−	PIM
1	Matyas Kovacs	Romania	5	6	9	15	+9	2
2	Szilard Rokaly	Romania	5	8	4	12	+7	4
3	Oriol Rubio	Spain	5	3	9	12	+7	2
3	Zoltan Sandor	Romania	5	3	9	12	+12	0
5	Luka Vukicevic	Serbia	5	7	3	10	+6	4
6	Tihamer Gyorfy	Romania	5	4	5	9	+11	2
7	Manuel Manero	Spain	5	4	4	8	+4	6
7	Otto Szopos	Romania	5	4	4	8	+12	6
9	Florin Creanga	Romania	5	1	7	8	+12	2
10	Ying Rudi	China	5	6	1	7	−3	12

GP = Games played; G = Goals; A = Assists; Pts = Points; +/− = P Plus–minus; PIM = Penalties In Minutes

Source: IIHF.com

==== Goaltending leaders ====
(minimum 40% team's total ice time)

Pos	Player	Country	TOI	GA	GAA	Sv%	SO
1	Jug Mitic	Serbia	258:44	11	2.55	93.53	0
2	Daniel Uruc	Romania	253:53	9	2.13	90.62	0
3	Shi Songyuan	China	154:56	11	4.26	89.42	0
4	Alejandro Reneses	Spain	296:34	13	2.63	89.08	1
5	Bruce Hallewaert	Belgium	212:17	21	5.94	87.57	0

TOI = Time On Ice (minutes:seconds); GA = Goals against; GAA = Goals against average; Sv% = Save percentage; SO = Shutouts

Source: IIHF.com

==== IIHF best player awards ====
- Goaltender: (Spain) Alejandro Reneses
- Defenceman: (Romania) Tihamer Gyorfy
- Forward: (Serbia) Lazar Lestaric
