= 2022 IIHF World U18 Championship Division II =

2022 IIHF U18 World Championship Division II
Tournament details
- Host countries: Estonia; Bulgaria
- Dates: 3–9 April (Group A); 21–27 March (Group B)
- Teams: 10

The 2022 IIHF U18 World Championship Division II were two international under-18 ice hockey tournaments organised by the International Ice Hockey Federation. The Division II A and Division II B tournaments represent the fourth and the fifth tier of the IIHF World U18 Championship.

== Division II A ==
2022 IIHF U18 World Championship Division II A

Tournament details
- Host country: Estonia
- Venue(s): 1 (in 1 host city)
- Dates: 3–9 April
- Teams: 6

Tournament statistics
- Games played: 15
- Goals scored: 106 (7.07 per game)
- Scoring leader(s): (South Korea) Kim Si-hwan (12 points)

The Division II A tournament was played in Tallinn, Estonia, from 3 to 9 April 2022.

=== Participants ===
Team	Qualification
Great Britain	placed 6th in 2019 Division I B and were relegated
Lithuania	placed 2nd in 2019 Division II A
Estonia	hosts, placed 3rd in 2019 Division II A
Romania	placed 4th in 2019 Division II A
South Korea	placed 5th in 2019 Division II A
Serbia	placed 1st in 2019 Division II B and were promoted

=== Standings ===
Pos	Team	Pld	W	OTW	OTL	L	GF	GA	GD	Pts	Promotion
1	South Korea	5	4	0	0	1	33	9	+24	12 (Note: South Korea 2–1 Estonia)	Promoted to the 2023 Division I B
2	Estonia (H)	5	4	0	0	1	24	7	+17	12	Promoted to the 2023 Division I B
3	Great Britain	5	3	1	0	1	20	9	+11	11	
4	Lithuania	5	2	0	0	3	16	21	−5	6	
5	Romania	5	1	0	1	3	6	21	−15	4	
6	Serbia	5	0	0	0	5	7	39	−32	0	

Source: IIHF
Rules for classification: 1) points; 2) head-to-head points; 3) head-to-head goal difference; 4) head-to-head number of goals scored; 5) result against closest best-ranked team outside tied teams; 6) result against second-best ranked team outside tied teams; 7) seeding before tournament.
(H) Host

=== Results ===
All times are local (UTC+3).

3 April 2022; 12:30	Serbia	2–3 (0–3, 1–0, 1–0)	Romania	Tondiraba Ice Hall, Tallinn

Game reference

Željko Bodiš
Goalies
Alex Olaru
Referee:
(Belgium) Niki de Herdt
Linesmen:
(Italy) Matthias Cristelli
(Lithuania) Aleksej Sascenkov

	0–1	02:47 – Lőrincz (Molnár)
	0–2	02:59 – Iuga (Ördög)
	0–3	14:59 – Nyisztor (Both) (SH)
Simić (Dinić) – 34:56	1–3
Dinić (PP, EA) – 59:09	2–3

8 min
Penalties
12 min
19
Shots
40

3 April 2022; 16:00	Estonia	3–2 (1–0, 0–1, 2–1)	Great Britain	Tondiraba Ice Hall, Tallinn; Attendance: 876

Game reference

Georg Vladimirov
Goalies
Benjamin Norton
Referee:
(Hungary) Dániel Soós
Linesmen:
(Kazakhstan) Vladislav Mashenkin
(Latvia) Agris Ozoliņš

Nevolainen (Proskurin, Novitskiy) (PP) – 16:02	1–0
	1–1	32:22 – Hazeldine (Hopkins) (PP)
Kontseus (E. Potšinok) – 43:53	2–1
	2–2	53:43 – Hopkins (Cooper, Hazeldine)
E. Potšinok – 56:50	3–2

6 min
Penalties
16 min
39
Shots
18

3 April 2022; 19:30	Lithuania	3–5 (1–1, 1–3, 1–1)	South Korea	Tondiraba Ice Hall, Tallinn; Attendance: 155

Game reference

Daniil Cepov
Goalies
Seo Kyung-min
Referee:
(United Kingdom) Pavel Halas Jr
Linesmen:
(Norway) Christopher Dehn
(Hungary) Dávid Váczi

Dumčius (PS) – 14:09	1–0
	1–1	18:14 – Lim (Kim Sa.) (PP)
Čižas (Andrejauskas, Grybauskas) (PP) – 23:50	2–1
	2–2	24:20 – Kim Si.
	2–3	29:05 – Lee D. (Jang, Lee Jae-s.)
	2–4	32:01 – Huh (Kim Sa., Lim) (PP)
	2–5	42:46 – Huh (Kim Si.) (PP)
Grybauskas (Ignatavičius, Andrejauskas) (PP) – 55:27	3–5

12 min
Penalties
6 min
15
Shots
36

5 April 2022; 12:30	Great Britain	3–2 OT (0–2, 2–0, 0–0); OT: (1–0)	Romania	Tondiraba Ice Hall, Tallinn; Attendance: 137

Game reference

Benjamin Norton
Goalies
Alex Olaru
Referee:
(Estonia) Artjom Jeremejev
Linesmen:
(Norway) Christopher Dehn
(Latvia) Agris Ozoliņš

	0–1	01:32 – Nyisztor
	0–2	08:50 – Molnár (PP)
Beatie (Hazeldine, Hopkins) (PP) – 21:11	1–2
Osborn (Lyne) – 24:06	2–2
Stewart – 60:37	3–2

12 min
Penalties
14 min
35
Shots
14

5 April 2022; 16:00	South Korea	15–2 (6–0, 7–1, 2–1)	Serbia	Tondiraba Ice Hall, Tallinn; Attendance: 177

Game reference

Seo Kyung-min
Oh Eun-yul
Goalies
Željko Bodiš
Lazar Ilić
Referee:
(United Kingdom) Pavel Halas Jr
Linesmen:
(Lithuania) Aleksej Sascenkov
(Estonia) Toivu Tilku

Huh – 02:35	1–0
Hong (Kong, Kim Si.) – 03:22	2–0
Kim Sa. (Lim, Lee M.) – 11:04	3–0
Kim Si. (Huh, Jung S.) – 12:32	4–0
Kim G. (Jung J. (Jang) – 16:39	5–0
Kim D. (Huh, Kim Si.) – 18:06	6–0
Lee M. (SH) – 23:04	7–0
Lee Jae-h. (Kwon) – 24:07	8–0
Chae (Jang, Kim D.) (PP) – 29:08	9–0
Kim Si. (Lee Jae-h., Yang) – 29:38	10–0
Kwon (Lim, Kong) – 30:15	11–0
Kim Sa. (PS) – 32:46	12–0
	12–1	33:53 – Simić
Lee Jae-s. (Kim Sa.) – 36:34	13–1
	13–2	44:41 – Vidović (SH)
Kwon (Jang, Kim D.) (PP) – 45:57	14–2
Kim Sa. (Kim Si., Kim D.) – 59:58	15–2

14 min
Penalties
12 min
72
Shots
8

5 April 2022; 19:30	Lithuania	3–8 (1–2, 1–4, 1–2)	Estonia	Tondiraba Ice Hall, Tallinn; Attendance: 928

Game reference

Domas Makarevičius
Daniil Cepov
Goalies
Georg Vladimirov
Referee:
(Hungary) Dániel Soós
Linesmen:
(Kazakhstan) Vladislav Mashenkin
(Hungary) Dávid Váczi

	0–1	07:39 – Nevolainen (Välja)
	0–2	13:46 – E. Potšinok (Stepanov)
Ignatavičius (Dumčius) – 19:41	1–2
	1–3	24:13 – M. Potšinok (Kontseus, E. Potšinok)
	1–4	36:17 – Stepanov (Nevolainen, Timofejev)
	1–5	37:53 – M. Potšinok (Proskurin, Timofejev) (PP)
Levčenko (Michalevič) – 39:01	2–5
	2–6	39:40 – Stepanov (Timofejev, Nevolainen)
Grybauskas (Ignatavičius) – 43:07	3–6
	3–7	44:12 – E. Potšinok (Kontseus, M. Potšinok)
	3–8	57:23 – Neltsas (Burkov, Välja)

6 min
Penalties
8 min
31
Shots
38

6 April 2022; 12:30	Great Britain	3–2 (1–2, 2–0, 0–0)	South Korea	Tondiraba Ice Hall, Tallinn; Attendance: 125

Game reference

Benjamin Norton
Goalies
Oh Eun-yol
Referee:
(Hungary) Dániel Soós
Linesmen:
(Kazakhstan) Vladislav Mashenkin
(Hungary) Dávid Váczi

Steele (Endicott, Russell) – 01:13	1–0
	1–1	05:55 – Chae (Kwon, Jang) (PP)
	1–2	17:32 – Lee Jae-s. (Chae)
Hopkins (PP) – 26:51	2–2
Stewart (Corkum) – 35:59	3–2

35 min
Penalties
10 min
14
Shots
33

6 April 2022; 16:00	Lithuania	6–3 (3–0, 0–2, 3–1)	Serbia	Tondiraba Ice Hall, Tallinn; Attendance: 115

Game reference

Daniil Cepov
Goalies
Lazar Ilić
Referee:
(Estonia) Artjom Jeremejev
Linesmen:
(Italy) Matthias Cristeli
(Estonia) Toivo Tilku

Jukna (Čyvas, Fediukin) – 13:51	1–0
Seniut (Dumčius, Levčenko) (PP) – 14:50	2–0
Cecekovas (Valčiukas, Valivonis) – 19:59	3–0
	3–1	26:00 – Ivanović (Vidović, Dinić)
	3–2	31:07 – Ivanovic (Dinić) (PP)
Michalevič (Levčenko, Seniut) (PP) – 41:02	4–2
	4–3	49:38 – Vidović (Dinić) (PP)
Levčenko (Čižas, Čyvas) – 52:02	5–3
Zeynalov – 53:24	6–3

14 min
Penalties
14 min
50
Shots
15

6 April 2022; 19:30	Estonia	5–0 (3–0, 2–0, 0–0)	Romania	Tondiraba Ice Hall, Tallinn; Attendance: 734

Game reference

Georg Vladimirov
Goalies
Alex Olaru
Nándor Bíró
Referee:
(Belgium) Niki de Herdt
Linesmen:
(Norway) Christopher Dehn
(Latvia) Agris Ozoliņš

Välja (Neltsas, Velja) – 10:01	1–0
Kontseus (Tammeorg) – 11:11	2–0
M. Potšinok (Kontseus, E. Potšinok) (PP) – 15:25	3–0
Sildre (Kontseus, M.Potšinok) (PP) – 23:08	4–0
M. Potšinok (Kontseus, E. Potšinok) – 27:48	5–0

10 min
Penalties
10 min
39
Shots
16

8 April 2022; 12:30	Romania	1–2 (0–2, 1–0, 0–0)	Lithuania	Tondiraba Ice Hall, Tallinn; Attendance: 233

Game reference

Alex Olaru
Goalies
Daniil Cepov
Referee:
(United Kingdom) Pavel Halas Jr
Linesmen:
(Norway) Christopher Dehn
(Estonia) Toivo Tilku

	0–1	01:44 – Levčenko (Čižas)
	0–2	19:26 – Ignatavičius (Valčiukas, Seniut)
Sârbu (Kovács, Nyika) (PP) – 23:58	1–2

58 min
Penalties
14 min
24
Shots
35

8 April 2022; 16:00	Serbia	0–8 (0–2, 0–5, 0–1)	Great Britain	Tondiraba Ice Hall, Tallinn; Attendance: 146

Game reference

Željko Bodiš
Lazar Ilić
Goalies
Benjamin Norton
Luca Tessadri
Referee:
(Belgium) Niki de Herdt
Linesmen:
(Italy) Matthias Cristeli
(Lithuania) Aleksej Sascenkov

0–1	00:53 – Stewart (Hopkins)
0–2	05:20 – Steele
0–3	20:45 – Hopkins (Stewart)
0–4	25:31 – Chung (Hamill)
0–5	29:40 – Brown (Beatie)
0–6	37:38 – Osborn (Hamill)
0–7	39:03 – Hamill (Stewart, Beatie) (PP)
0–8	51:17 – Hamill

12 min
Penalties
14 min
14
Shots
47

8 April 2022; 19:30	South Korea	2–1 (0–0, 0–1, 2–0)	Estonia	Tondiraba Ice Hall, Tallinn; Attendance: 1,857

Game reference

Seo Kyung-min
Goalies
Georg Vladimirov
Referee:
(Hungary) Dániel Soós
Linesmen:
(Kazakhstan) Vladislav Mashenkin
(Hungary) Dávid Váczi

	0–1	31:18 – E. Potšinok (M. Potšinok, Kontseus) (PP)
Kim Si. (Kim D.) – 57:45	1–1
Lim (PP, EA) – 59:42	2–1

16 min
Penalties
14 min
34
Shots
25

9 April 2022; 12:30	Great Britain	4–2 (2–1, 0–1, 2–0)	Lithuania	Tondiraba Ice Hall, Tallinn; Attendance: 212

Game reference
			Referee: (Belgium) Niki de Herdt; Linesmen: (Kazakhstan) Vladislav Mashenkin (Latvia) Agris Ozoliņš
14 min	Penalties	8 min	Referee: (Belgium) Niki de Herdt; Linesmen: (Kazakhstan) Vladislav Mashenkin (Latvia) Agris Ozoliņš
23	Shots	27	Referee: (Belgium) Niki de Herdt; Linesmen: (Kazakhstan) Vladislav Mashenkin (Latvia) Agris Ozoliņš

9 April 2022; 16:00	Estonia	7–0 (1–0, 4–0, 2–0)	Serbia	Tondiraba Ice Hall, Tallinn; Attendance: 956

Game reference
			Referee: (United Kingdom) Pavel Halas Jr; Linesmen: (Italy) Matthias Cristeli (Norway) Christopher Dehn
10 min	Penalties	6 min	Referee: (United Kingdom) Pavel Halas Jr; Linesmen: (Italy) Matthias Cristeli (Norway) Christopher Dehn
49	Shots	17	Referee: (United Kingdom) Pavel Halas Jr; Linesmen: (Italy) Matthias Cristeli (Norway) Christopher Dehn

9 April 2022; 19:30	Romania	0–9 (0–1, 0–2, 0–6)	South Korea	Tondiraba Ice Hall, Tallinn; Attendance: 568

Game reference
			Referee: (Estonia) Artjom Jeremejev; Linesmen: (Lithuania) Aleksej Sascenkov (Estonia) Toivo Tilku
18 min	Penalties	16 min	Referee: (Estonia) Artjom Jeremejev; Linesmen: (Lithuania) Aleksej Sascenkov (Estonia) Toivo Tilku
12	Shots	58	Referee: (Estonia) Artjom Jeremejev; Linesmen: (Lithuania) Aleksej Sascenkov (Estonia) Toivo Tilku

== Division II B ==
2022 IIHF U18 World Championship Division II B

Tournament details
- Host country: Bulgaria
- Venue(s): 1 (in 1 host city)
- Dates: 21–24 March
- Teams: 4

Tournament statistics
- Games played: 6
- Goals scored: 40 (6.67 per game)
- Attendance: 3,610 (602 per game)
- Scoring leader(s): (Croatia) Karlo Marinković (10 points)

The Division II B tournament was played in Sofia, Bulgaria, from 21 to 24 March 2022.

=== Participants ===
Team	Qualification
Spain	placed 6th in 2019 Division II A and were relegated
~~China~~	placed 2nd in 2019 Division II B
Netherlands	placed 3rd in 2019 Division II B
Croatia	placed 4th in 2019 Division II B
~~Australia~~	placed 5th in 2019 Division II B
Bulgaria	hosts, placed 1st in 2019 Division III A and were promoted

=== Standings ===
Pos	Team	Pld	W	OTW	OTL	L	GF	GA	GD	Pts	Promotion
1	Croatia	3	3	0	0	0	18	2	+16	9	Promoted to the 2023 Division II A
2	Spain	3	2	0	0	1	9	7	+2	6	Promoted to the 2023 Division II A
3	Netherlands	3	1	0	0	2	10	12	−2	3	
4	Bulgaria (H)	3	0	0	0	3	3	19	−16	0	
–	China (Note: China withdrew their team because of the COVID-19 pandemic.)	0	0	0	0	0	0	0	0	0	Withdrawn
–	Australia (Note: Australia withdrew their team on 22 January 2022 because of the COVID-19 pandemic.)	0	0	0	0	0	0	0	0	0	Withdrawn

Source: IIHF
Rules for classification: 1) points; 2) head-to-head points; 3) head-to-head goal difference; 4) head-to-head number of goals scored; 5) result against closest best-ranked team outside tied teams; 6) result against second-best ranked team outside tied teams; 7) seeding before tournament.
(H) Host

=== Results ===
All times are local (UTC+2).

21 March 2022; 15:30	Spain	0–5 (0–1, 0–2, 0–2)	Croatia	Winter Sports Palace, Sofia; Attendance: 150

Game reference
10 min	Penalties	6 min
31	Shots	41

21 March 2022; 19:00	Netherlands	8–1 (3–1, 3–0, 2–0)	Bulgaria	Winter Sports Palace, Sofia; Attendance: 1,250

Game reference
14 min	Penalties	10 min
52	Shots	21

22 March 2022; 15:30	Netherlands	1–8 (0–1, 1–2, 0–5)	Croatia	Winter Sports Palace, Sofia; Attendance: 80

Game reference
16 min	Penalties	2 min
18	Shots	48

22 March 2022; 19:00	Bulgaria	1–6 (0–2, 0–2, 1–2)	Spain	Winter Sports Palace, Sofia; Attendance: 850

Game reference
14 min	Penalties	10 min
18	Shots	52

24 March 2022; 15:30	Spain	3–1 (0–0, 2–1, 1–0)	Netherlands	Winter Sports Palace, Sofia; Attendance: 180

Game reference
8 min	Penalties	12 min
30	Shots	19

24 March 2022; 19:00	Croatia	5–1 (1–1, 3–0, 1–0)	Bulgaria	Winter Sports Palace, Sofia; Attendance: 1,100

Game reference
10 min	Penalties	12 min
41	Shots	23
