= 2026 IIHF World U18 Championship Division II =

2026 IIHF U18 World Championship Division II
Tournament details
- Host countries: Romania; Serbia
- Venues: 2 (in 2 host cities)
- Dates: 12–18 April 2026 (A); 5–11 April 2026 (B)
- Teams: 12

The 2026 IIHF U18 World Championship Division II consisted of two international under-18 ice hockey tournaments organized by the International Ice Hockey Federation. Divisions II A and II B represent the fourth and the fifth tier of the IIHF World U18 Championship.

== Division II A ==
2026 IIHF U18 World Championship Division II A

Tournament details
- Host country: Romania
- City: Târgu Secuiesc
- Venue: 1 (in 1 host city)
- Dates: 12–18 April 2026
- Teams: 6

Tournament statistics
- Games played: 15
- Goals scored: 88 (5.87 per game)
- Attendance: 5,524 (368 per game)
- Scoring leader: (Japan) Kanata Mori (11 points)

Official website
- www.iihf.com

The Division II Group A tournament was played in Târgu Secuiesc, Romania, from 12 to 18 April 2026.

=== Participating teams ===
Team	Qualification
Japan	Placed 6th in Division I B last year and were relegated
Great Britain	Placed 2nd in Division II A last year
China	Placed 3rd in Division II A last year
Croatia	Placed 4th in Division II A last year
Romania	Placed 5th in Division II A last year
Spain	Placed 1st in Division II B last year and were promoted

=== Standings ===
Pos	Team	Pld	W	OTW	OTL	L	GF	GA	GD	Pts	Promotion or relegation
1	Japan	5	5	0	0	0	31	7	+24	15	
2	China	5	4	0	0	1	11	5	+6	12	
3	Great Britain	5	2	0	0	3	14	13	+1	6 (Note: Great Britain 3 Pts, 0 GD, 7 GS; Romania 3 Pts, 0 GD, 7 GS; Croatia 3 Pts, 0 GD, 5 GS. Great Britain 5–4 Romania)	
4	Romania (H)	5	2	0	0	3	11	20	−9	6	
5	Croatia	5	2	0	0	3	13	19	−6	6	
6	Spain	5	0	0	0	5	8	24	−16	0	Relegation to the 2027 Division II B

Source: IIHF
Rules for classification: 1) points; 2) head-to-head points; 3) head-to-head goal difference; 4) head-to-head number of goals scored; 5) result against closest best-ranked team outside tied teams; 6) result against second-best ranked team outside tied teams; 7) seeding before tournament.
(H) Host

=== Match results ===
All times are local (Eastern European Summer Time; UTC+3).

12 April 2026; 12:30	China	1–3 (2–0, 1–1, 2–1)	Japan	Deme Laszlo Arena; Attendance: 323

Game reference
10 min	Penalties	8 min
16	Shots	39

12 April 2026; 16:00	Spain	4–7 (0–1, 4–3, 0–3)	Croatia	Deme Laszlo Arena; Attendance: 361

Game reference
10 min	Penalties	8 min
25	Shots	41

12 April 2026; 19:30	Great Britain	5–4 (3–1, 1–0, 1–3)	Romania	Deme Laszlo Arena; Attendance: 550

Game reference
6 min	Penalties	8 min
45	Shots	24

13 April 2026; 12:30	Japan	7–1 (1–1, 5–0, 1–0)	Croatia	Deme Laszlo Arena; Attendance: 152

Game reference
2 min	Penalties	6 min
67	Shots	17

13 April 2026; 16:00	Great Britain	0–1 (0–0, 0–0, 0–1)	China	Deme Laszlo Arena; Attendance: 239

Game reference
8 min	Penalties	2 min
31	Shots	34

13 April 2026; 19:30	Romania	2–1 (0–0, 1–1, 1–0)	Spain	Deme Laszlo Arena; Attendance: 550

Game reference
2 min	Penalties	6 min
39	Shots	38

15 April 2026; 12:30	China	3–0 (0–0, 2–0, 1–0)	Croatia	Deme Laszlo Arena; Attendance: 161

Game reference
6 min	Penalties	4 min
40	Shots	24

15 April 2026; 16:00	Great Britain	4–1 (2–0, 2–1, 0–0)	Spain	Deme Laszlo Arena; Attendance: 171

Game reference
16 min	Penalties	12 min
36	Shots	30

15 April 2026; 19:30	Japan	8–0 (2–0, 3–0, 3–0)	Romania	Deme Laszlo Arena; Attendance: 550

Game reference
8 min	Penalties	6 min
61	Shots	23

16 April 2026; 12:30	Croatia	3–2 (2–1, 0–1, 1–0)	Great Britain	Deme Laszlo Arena; Attendance: 427

Game reference
6 min	Penalties	29 min
32	Shots	48

16 April 2026; 16:00	Spain	2–9 (0–3, 1–4, 1–2)	Japan	Deme Laszlo Arena; Attendance: 152

Game reference
37 min	Penalties	14 min
25	Shots	50

16 April 2026; 19:30	Romania	2–4 (1–0, 1–1, 0–3)	China	Deme Laszlo Arena; Attendance: 550

Game reference
8 min	Penalties	6 min
28	Shots	31

18 April 2026; 12:30	China	2–0 (0–0, 1–0, 1–0)	Spain	Deme Laszlo Arena; Attendance: 238

Game reference
14 min	Penalties	10 min
29	Shots	25

18 April 2026; 16:00	Japan	4–3 (1–0, 2–2, 1–1)	Great Britain	Deme Laszlo Arena; Attendance: 550

Game reference
33 min	Penalties	35 min
50	Shots	29

18 April 2026; 19:30	Croatia	2–3 (0–0, 1–1, 1–2)	Romania	Deme Laszlo Arena; Attendance: 550

Game reference
8 min	Penalties	10 min
25	Shots	40

Source: Match schedule

== Division II B ==
2026 IIHF U18 World Championship Division II B

Tournament details
- Host country: Serbia
- City: Belgrade
- Venue: 1 (in 1 host city)
- Dates: 5–11 April 2026
- Teams: 6

Tournament statistics
- Games played: 15
- Goals scored: 104 (6.93 per game)
- Attendance: 4,191 (279 per game)
- Scoring leader: (Netherlands) Hector Kapitonov (12 points)

Official website
- www.iihf.com

The Division II Group B tournament was played in Belgrade, Serbia, from 5 to 11 April 2026.

=== Participating teams ===
Team	Qualification
Netherlands	Placed 6th in Division II A last year and were relegated
Australia	Placed 2nd in Division II B last year
Chinese Taipei	Placed 3rd in Division II B last year
Belgium	Placed 4th in Division II B last year
Serbia	Hosts; placed 5th in Division II B last year
Mexico	Placed 1st in Division III A last year and were promoted

=== Standings ===
Pos	Team	Pld	W	OTW	OTL	L	GF	GA	GD	Pts	Promotion or relegation
1	Netherlands	5	3	1	0	1	22	16	+6	11	
2	Mexico	5	2	1	1	1	16	13	+3	9 (Note: Serbia 2–4 Mexico)	
3	Serbia (H)	5	3	0	0	2	22	14	+8	9	
4	Australia	5	2	1	0	2	19	19	0	8	
5	Belgium	5	1	0	2	2	13	23	−10	5	
6	Chinese Taipei	5	1	0	0	4	12	19	−7	3	Relegation to the 2027 Division III A

Source: IIHF
Rules for classification: 1) points; 2) head-to-head points; 3) head-to-head goal difference; 4) head-to-head number of goals scored; 5) result against closest best-ranked team outside tied teams; 6) result against second-best ranked team outside tied teams; 7) seeding before tournament.
(H) Host

=== Match results ===
All times are local (Central European Summer Time; UTC+2).

5 April 2026; 12:30	Chinese Taipei	5–2 (2–0, 1–1, 2–1)	Netherlands	Pionir Ice Hall; Attendance: 42

Game reference
12 min	Penalties	6 min
18	Shots	40

5 April 2026; 16:00	Mexico	3–2 GWS (0–1, 1–0, 1–1); OT: (0–0); SO: (1–0)	Belgium	Pionir Ice Hall; Attendance: 47

Game reference
14 min	Penalties	16 min
33	Shots	45

5 April 2026; 19:30	Australia	4–8 (3–1, 1–3, 0–4)	Serbia	Pionir Ice Hall; Attendance: 496

Game reference
6 min	Penalties	6 min
23	Shots	51

6 April 2026; 12:30	Netherlands	6–2 (2–1, 1–0, 3–1)	Belgium	Pionir Ice Hall; Attendance: 67

Game reference
4 min	Penalties	10 min
48	Shots	22

6 April 2026; 16:00	Australia	5–1 (2–1, 1–0, 2–0)	Chinese Taipei	Pionir Ice Hall; Attendance: 55

Game reference
16 min	Penalties	16 min
28	Shots	39

6 April 2026; 19:30	Serbia	2–4 (1–1, 1–1, 0–2)	Mexico	Pionir Ice Hall; Attendance: 833

Game reference
14 min	Penalties	6 min
48	Shots	30

8 April 2026; 12:30	Australia	3–2 (2–0, 0–0, 1–2)	Mexico	Pionir Ice Hall; Attendance: 67

Game reference
10 min	Penalties	6 min
26	Shots	38

8 April 2026; 16:00	Chinese Taipei	4–5 (1–1, 3–1, 0–3)	Belgium	Pionir Ice Hall; Attendance: 64

Game reference
8 min	Penalties	6 min
32	Shots	44

8 April 2026; 19:30	Netherlands	4–2 (2–1, 0–0, 2–1)	Serbia	Pionir Ice Hall; Attendance: 736

Game reference
18 min	Penalties	10 min
26	Shots	40

9 April 2026; 12:30	Belgium	2–3 GWS (1–1, 1–1, 0–0); OT: (0–0); SO: (0–1)	Australia	Pionir Ice Hall; Attendance: 82

Game reference
14 min	Penalties	6 min
23	Shots	44

9 April 2026; 16:00	Mexico	3–4 OT (2–2, 1–1, 0–0); OT: (0–1)	Netherlands	Pionir Ice Hall; Attendance: 105

Game reference
10 min	Penalties	10 min
22	Shots	35

9 April 2026; 19:30	Serbia	3–0 (1–0, 1–0, 1–0)	Chinese Taipei	Pionir Ice Hall; Attendance: 634

Game reference
2 min	Penalties	10 min
34	Shots	22

11 April 2026; 12:30	Chinese Taipei	2–4 (2–1, 0–2, 0–1)	Mexico	Pionir Ice Hall; Attendance: 63

Game reference
12 min	Penalties	27 min
24	Shots	58

11 April 2026; 16:00	Netherlands	6–4 (1–1, 3–2, 2–1)	Australia	Pionir Ice Hall; Attendance: 74

Game reference
10 min	Penalties	8 min
43	Shots	35

11 April 2026; 19:30	Belgium	2–7 (1–2, 1–2, 0–3)	Serbia	Pionir Ice Hall; Attendance: 826

Game reference
24 min	Penalties	10 min
24	Shots	38

Source: Match schedule
