= 2007 IIHF World U18 Championship Division II =

Tournament details
- Host countries: Hungary; Romania
- Dates: 12 – 18 March 2007; 15 – 21 April 2007
- Teams: 12

The 2007 IIHF World U18 Championship Division II were a pair of international under-18 ice hockey tournaments run by the International Ice Hockey Federation. The Division II tournaments made up the third level of competition at the 2007 IIHF World U18 Championships. The Group A tournament took place between 15 and 21 April 2007 in Miskolc, Hungary and the Group B tournament took place between 12 and 18 March 2007 in Miercurea Ciuc, Romania. The Netherlands and Lithuania won the Group A and Group B tournaments respectively and gained promotion to Division I for the 2008 IIHF World U18 Championships. While Mexico finished last in Group A and Serbia last in Group B and were both relegated to Division III for 2008.

== Group A tournament ==
The Group A tournament began on 15 April 2007 in Miskolc, Hungary. Belgium, Estonia, Mexico and the Netherlands returned to compete in the Division II competition after missing promotion to Division I at the previous years World Championships. Hungary entered the Division II competition after being relegated from Division I and Israel entered the tournament after gaining promotion from Division III at the 2006 IIHF World U18 Championships.

The Netherlands won the tournament after winning all five of their games and gained promotion to Division I for the 2008 IIHF World U18 Championships. Hungary finished in second place, losing only to the Netherlands and Estonia finished in third. Mexico finished in last place after losing all five of their games and were relegated to Division III for the 2008 IIHF World U18 Championships. Eden Nemenoff of Israel was named as the tournament's top goaltender by the IIHF directorate. Hungarian Daniel Koger was named the top forward and Mike Dalhuisen of the Netherlands was selected as the top defenceman. Hungary's Bálint Magosi was the tournament's leading scorer with 14 points and Miklos Rajna was the leading goaltender with a save percentage of 0.938.

=== Standings ===
Pos	Team	Pld	W	OTW	OTL	L	GF	GA	GD	Pts	Promotion or relegation
1	Netherlands	5	5	0	0	0	39	9	+30	15	Promoted to Division I for 2008
2	Hungary	5	4	0	0	1	48	7	+41	12	
3	Estonia	5	2	1	0	2	21	23	−2	8	
4	Belgium	5	2	0	0	3	17	37	−20	6	
5	Israel	5	1	0	0	4	11	36	−25	3	
6	Mexico	5	0	0	1	4	9	33	−24	1	Relegated to Division III for 2008

=== Fixtures ===
All times local.

15 April 2007; 13:00	Israel	2 – 5 (0–0, 2–1, 0–4)	Belgium	Miskolc Arena; Attendance: 400

Game reference

15 April 2007; 16:30	Netherlands	10 – 0 (5–0, 2–0, 3–0)	Mexico	Miskolc Arena; Attendance: 500

Game reference

15 April 2007; 20:00	Estonia	0 – 7 (0–2, 0–2, 0–3)	Hungary	Miskolc Arena; Attendance: 1200

Game reference

17 April 2007; 13:00	Netherlands	11 – 1 (3–0, 4–1, 4–0)	Estonia	Miskolc Arena; Attendance: 350

Game reference

17 April 2007; 16:30	Mexico	3 – 5 (1–2, 1–2, 1–1)	Israel	Miskolc Arena; Attendance: 320

Game reference

17 April 2007; 20:00	Hungary	16 – 0 (6–0, 6–0, 4–0)	Belgium	Miskolc Arena; Attendance: 1300

Game reference

18 April 2007; 13:00	Netherlands	7 – 1 (4–1, 1–0, 2–0)	Israel	Miskolc Arena; Attendance: 150

Game reference

18 April 2007; 16:30	Estonia	8 – 3 (5–0, 2–1, 1–2)	Belgium	Miskolc Arena; Attendance: 160

Game reference

18 April 2007; 20:00	Hungary	10 – 0 (5–0, 3–0, 2–0)	Mexico	Miskolc Arena; Attendance: 1300

Game reference

20 April 2007; 13:00	Mexico	2 – 3 GWS (2–1, 0–1, 0–0) (OT 0–0) (SO: 0–1)	Estonia	Miskolc Arena; Attendance: 100

Game reference

20 April 2007; 16:30	Belgium	4 – 7 (0–0, 2–5, 2–2)	Netherlands	Miskolc Arena; Attendance: 270

Game reference

20 April 2007; 20:00	Israel	3 – 12 (2–5, 0–4, 1–3)	Hungary	Miskolc Arena; Attendance: 1400

Game reference

21 April 2007; 13:00	Belgium	5 – 4 (0–1, 0–2, 5–1)	Mexico	Miskolc Arena; Attendance: 120

Game reference

21 April 2007; 16:30	Estonia	9 – 0 (5–0, 2–0, 2–0)	Israel	Miskolc Arena; Attendance: 250

Game reference

21 April 2007; 20:00	Hungary	3 – 4 (0–2, 1–2, 2–0)	Netherlands	Miskolc Arena; Attendance: 1800

Game reference

=== Scoring leaders ===
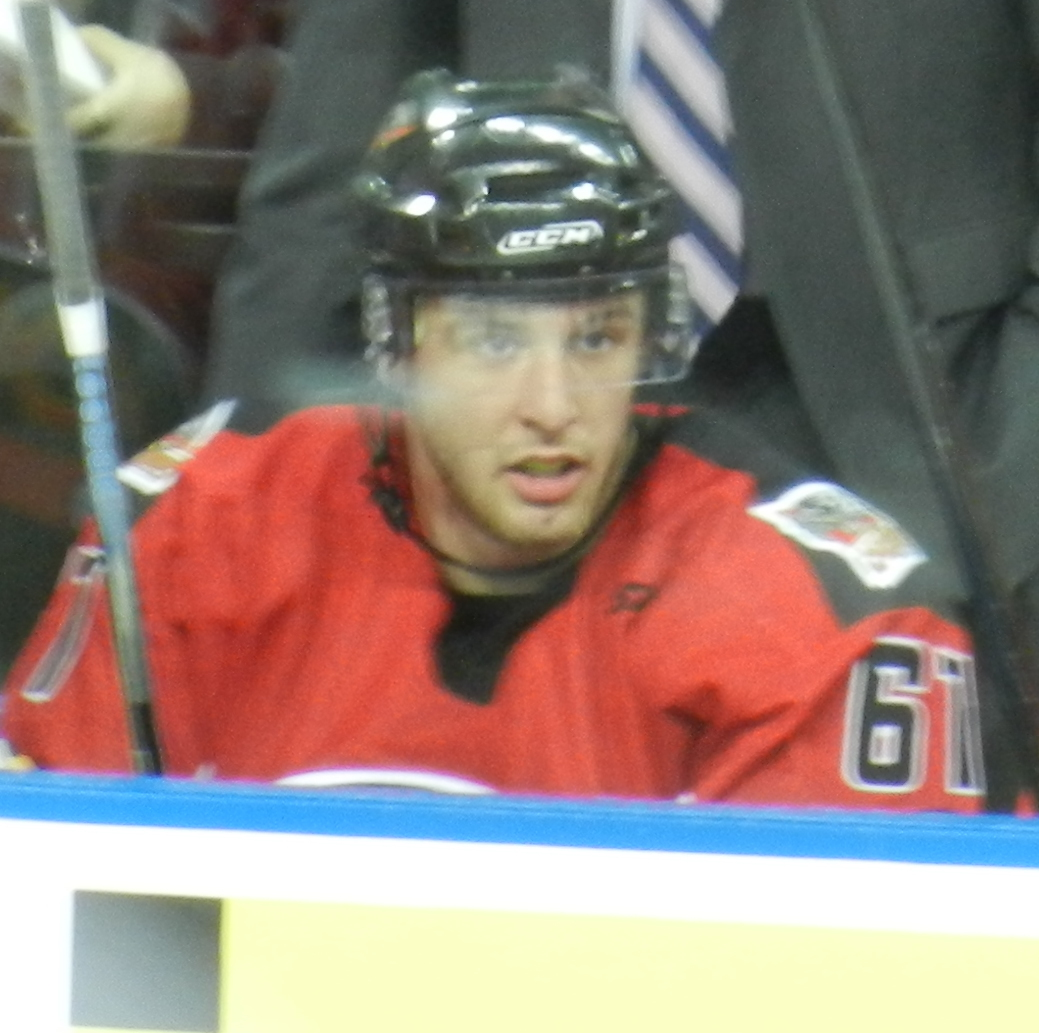
Daniel Koger scored four goals and eight assists to finish fourth in scoring.

List shows the top ten ranked skaters sorted by points, then goals.

Player	GP	G	A	Pts	+/-	PIM	POS
(Hungary) Bálint Magosi	5	9	5	14	+17	8	F
(Hungary) Gergo Nagy	5	8	5	13	+10	34	F
(Hungary) Laszlo Jonkl	5	5	7	12	+13	4	F
(Hungary) Daniel Koger	5	4	8	12	+9	2	F
(Belgium) Ben van den Bogeart	5	10	1	11	–4	8	F
(Netherlands) Mike Dalhuisen	5	5	6	11	+12	14	D
(Netherlands) Mitch Bruijsten	5	8	2	10	+9	18	F
(Netherlands) Ritchie van Hulten	5	5	5	10	+8	10	F
(Hungary) Dezso Roczanov	5	7	2	9	+10	27	F
(Israel) Daniel Erlich	5	4	5	9	–12	32	F

=== Leading goaltenders ===
Only the top five goaltenders, based on save percentage, who have played at least 40% of their team's minutes are included in this list.

Player	MIP	SOG	GA	GAA	SVS%	SO
(Hungary) Miklos Rajna	120:00	48	3	1.50	93.75	1
(Hungary) David Meretei	178:44	49	4	1.34	91.84	2
(Estonia) Villem Koitmaa	239:50	125	12	3.00	90.40	0
(Netherlands) Tomislav Hrelja	300:00	80	9	1.80	88.75	1
(Israel) Eden Nemenoff	259:46	231	31	7.16	86.58	0

== Group B tournament ==
The Group B tournament began on 12 March 2007 in Miercurea Ciuc, Romania. Australia, Croatia and Lithuania all returned to compete in the Division II tournament after missing promotion to Division I at the previous years World Championships. Serbia made their debut appearance in the World U18 Championships after replacing the Serbia and Montenegro men's national under-18 ice hockey team, the change in team coinciding with Montenegro's declaration of independence and the eventual split of the State Union of Serbia and Montenegro. South Korea entered the Division II competition after being relegated from Division I and Romania entered the tournament after gaining promotion from Division III at the 2006 IIHF World U18 Championships.

Lithuania won the tournament after winning all five of their games and gained promotion to Division I for the 2008 IIHF World U18 Championships. South Korea finished second after losing only to Lithuania and Estonia finished in third place. Serbia finished in last place after losing all five of their games and were relegated to Division III for the 2008 IIHF World U18 Championships. Tihomir Filipec of Croatia was named as the tournament's top goaltender by the IIHF directorate. Lithuanian Povilas Verenis was named the top forward and Cho Hyung Gon of South Korea was selected as the top defenceman. Lithuania's Tadas Kumeliauskas was the tournament's leading scorer with 12 points and Arturas Kuzmicius was the leading goaltender with a save percentage of 0.948.

=== Standings ===
Pos	Team	Pld	W	OTW	OTL	L	GF	GA	GD	Pts	Promotion or relegation
1	Lithuania	5	5	0	0	0	32	9	+23	15	Promoted to Division I for 2008
2	South Korea	5	3	1	0	1	27	14	+13	11	
3	Croatia	5	2	0	2	1	24	19	+5	8	
4	Romania	5	2	0	0	3	15	25	−10	6	
5	Australia	5	0	2	0	3	13	25	−12	4	
6	Serbia	5	0	0	1	4	10	29	−19	1	Relegated to Division III for 2008

=== Fixtures ===
All times local.

12 March 2007; 13:30	Australia	2 – 6 (0–1, 1–1, 1–4)	South Korea	Vakar Lajos Icerink; Attendance: 30

Game reference

12 March 2007; 17:00	Lithuania	6 – 2 (1–1, 0–1, 5–0)	Serbia	Vakar Lajos Icerink; Attendance: 200

Game reference

12 March 2007; 20:30	Romania	0 – 10 (0–3, 0–4, 0–3)	Croatia	Vakar Lajos Icerink; Attendance: 200

13 March 2007; 13:30	Lithuania	8 – 2 (3–1, 3–0, 2–1)	Australia	Vakar Lajos Icerink; Attendance: 50

Game reference

13 March 2007; 17:00	South Korea	5 – 4 GWS (1–2, 1–1, 2–1) (OT 0–0) (SO: 1–0)	Croatia	Vakar Lajos Icerink; Attendance: 100

Game reference

13 March 2007; 20:30	Serbia	4 – 6 (1–3, 2–0, 1–3)	Romania	Vakar Lajos Icerink; Attendance: 300

Game reference

15 March 2007; 13:30	South Korea	8 – 0 (2–0, 4–0, 2–0)	Serbia	Vakar Lajos Icerink; Attendance: 50

Game reference

15 March 2007; 17:00	Australia	5 – 4 GWS (2–1, 1–2, 1–1) (OT 0–0) (SO: 1–0)	Croatia	Vakar Lajos Icerink; Attendance: 130

Game reference

15 March 2007; 20:30	Lithuania	5 – 2 (1–2, 1–0, 3–0)	Romania	Vakar Lajos Icerink; Attendance: 300

Game reference

16 March 2007; 13:30	Serbia	3 – 4 GWS (1–0, 1–1, 1–2) (OT 0–0) (SO: 0–1)	Australia	Vakar Lajos Icerink

Game reference

16 March 2007; 17:00	Croatia	1 – 8 (0–0, 1–3, 0–5)	Lithuania	Vakar Lajos Icerink; Attendance: 200

Game reference

16 March 2007; 20:30	Romania	3 – 6 (1–1, 1–4, 1–1)	South Korea	Vakar Lajos Icerink; Attendance: 350

Game reference

18 March 2007; 12:30	Croatia	5 – 1 (2–0, 3–0, 0–1)	Serbia	Vakar Lajos Icerink; Attendance: 50

Game reference

18 March 2007; 16:00	South Korea	2 – 5 (1–1, 1–0, 0–4)	Lithuania	Vakar Lajos Icerink; Attendance: 200

Game reference

18 March 2007; 19:30	Australia	0 – 4 (0–4, 0–0, 0–0)	Romania	Vakar Lajos Icerink; Attendance: 350

Game reference

=== Scoring leaders ===
List shows the top ten ranked skaters sorted by points, then goals.

Player	GP	G	A	Pts	+/-	PIM	POS
(Lithuania) Tadas Kumeliauskas	5	5	7	12	+12	4	F
(Lithuania) Povilas Verenis	5	7	4	11	+12	8	F
(Romania) Lorand Bartha	5	5	4	9	-7	20	F
(Croatia) Vladimir Gurka	5	5	4	9	+2	4	F
(South Korea) Yoon Ji Man	5	4	5	9	+5	6	F
(South Korea) Park Sang Jin	5	7	1	8	+4	2	F
(Romania) Zsolt Balint	5	4	4	8	-5	16	F
(Lithuania) Jonas Viknius	5	2	6	8	+2	8	F
(Lithuania) Arnoldas Bosas	5	6	1	7	+5	6	F
(South Korea) Lee Sung Jun	5	6	1	7	+6	14	F

=== Leading goaltenders ===
Only the top five goaltenders, based on save percentage, who have played at least 40% of their team's minutes are included in this list.

Player	MIP	SOG	GA	GAA	SVS%	SO
(Lithuania) Arturas Kuzmicius	120:00	58	3	1.50	94.83	0
(Lithuania) Ernestas Kielius	180:00	79	6	2.00	92.41	0
(Australia) Anthony Kimlin	244:47	182	14	3.43	92.31	0
(Croatia) Tihomir Filipec	310:00	195	19	3.68	90.26	1
(South Korea) Yong Hyun Ho	242:40	112	13	3.21	88.39	0
