= 2025 IIHF World U18 Championship Division II =

2025 IIHF U18 World Championship Division II
Tournament details
- Host countries: Italy; Bulgaria
- Venues: 2 (in 2 host cities)
- Dates: 13–19 April 2025 (A); 17–23 March 2025 (B)
- Teams: 12

The 2025 IIHF U18 World Championship Division II consisted of two international under-18 ice hockey tournaments organized by the International Ice Hockey Federation. Divisions II A and II B represent the fourth and the fifth tier of the IIHF World U18 Championship.

== Division II A ==
2025 IIHF U18 World Championship Division II A

Tournament details
- Host country: Italy
- City: Asiago
- Venue: 1 (in 1 host city)
- Dates: 13–19 April 2025
- Teams: 6

Tournament statistics
- Games played: 15
- Goals scored: 79 (5.27 per game)
- Attendance: 5,785 (386 per game)
- Scoring leader: (Croatia) Bruno Alić (8 points)

Official website
- www.iihf.com

The Division II Group A tournament was played in Asiago, Italy, from 13 to 19 April 2025.

=== Participating teams ===
Team	Qualification
Italy	Hosts; placed 6th in Division I B last year and were relegated
Great Britain	Placed 2nd in Division II A last year
Netherlands	Placed 3rd in Division II A last year
Romania	Placed 4th in Division II A last year
Croatia	Placed 5th in Division II A last year
China	Placed 1st in Division II B last year and were promoted

=== Final standings ===
Pos	Team	Pld	W	OTW	OTL	L	GF	GA	GD	Pts	Promotion or relegation
1	Italy (H)	5	5	0	0	0	23	7	+16	15	Promoted to the 2026 Division I B
2	Great Britain	5	4	0	0	1	12	4	+8	12	
3	China	5	2	0	1	2	13	14	−1	7	
4	Croatia	5	1	1	1	2	14	14	0	6	
5	Romania	5	1	1	0	3	10	17	−7	5	
6	Netherlands	5	0	0	0	5	7	23	−16	0	Relegated to the 2026 Division II B

Source: IIHF
Rules for classification: 1) points; 2) head-to-head points; 3) head-to-head goal difference; 4) head-to-head number of goals scored; 5) result against closest best-ranked team outside tied teams; 6) result against second-best ranked team outside tied teams; 7) seeding before tournament.
(H) Host

=== Match results ===
All times are local (Central European Summer Time – UTC+2).

13 April 2025; 13:00	China	4–1 (2–0, 0–1, 2–0)	Romania	Palaodegar, Asiago

Game reference
6 min	Penalties	4 min
25	Shots	34

13 April 2025; 16:30	Great Britain	3–0 (0–0, 1–0, 2–0)	Croatia	Palaodegar, Asiago

Game reference
12 min	Penalties	4 min
32	Shots	28

13 April 2025; 20:00	Netherlands	1–6 (0–2, 1–1, 0–3)	Italy	Palaodegar, Asiago

Game reference
8 min	Penalties	6 min
17	Shots	45

14 April 2025; 13:00	Croatia	4–3 (GWS) (2–0, 1–2, 0–1) (OT: 0–0, GWS: 1–0)	China	Palaodegar, Asiago

Game reference
10 min	Penalties	12 min
25	Shots	39

14 April 2025; 16:30	Great Britain	1–0 (1–0, 0–0, 0–0)	Netherlands	Palaodegar, Asiago

Game reference
16 min	Penalties	12 min
30	Shots	49

14 April 2025; 20:00	Italy	6–0 (1–0, 3–0, 2–0)	Romania	Palaodegar, Asiago

Game reference
6 min	Penalties	4 min
37	Shots	16

16 April 2025; 13:00	Great Britain	3–0 (0–0, 1–0, 2–0)	China	Palaodegar, Asiago

Game reference
8 min	Penalties	8 min
34	Shots	27

16 April 2025; 16:30	Netherlands	2–6 (2–1, 0–3, 0–2)	Romania	Palaodegar, Asiago

Game reference
10 min	Penalties	35 min
26	Shots	25

16 April 2025; 20:00	Italy	3–2 (2–2, 0–0, 1–0)	Croatia	Palaodegar, Asiago

Game reference
6 min	Penalties	4 min
46	Shots	18

17 April 2025; 13:00	Romania	0–3 (0–0, 0–1, 0–2)	Great Britain	Palaodegar, Asiago

Game reference
12 min	Penalties	14 min
33	Shots	27

17 April 2025; 16:30	Croatia	6–2 (1–1, 2–1, 3–0)	Netherlands	Palaodegar, Asiago

Game reference
8 min	Penalties	10 min
19	Shots	32

17 April 2025; 20:00	China	2–4 (0–3, 1–0, 1–1)	Italy	Palaodegar, Asiago

Game reference
4 min	Penalties	6 min
10	Shots	40

19 April 2025; 13:00	Romania	3–2 OT (1–0, 1–0, 0–2) (OT: 1–0)	Croatia	Palaodegar, Asiago

Game reference
14 min	Penalties	6 min
35	Shots	28

19 April 2025; 16:30	Netherlands	2–4 (1–1, 0–2, 1–1)	China	Palaodegar, Asiago

Game reference
16 min	Penalties	16 min
22	Shots	22

19 April 2025; 20:00	Italy	4–2 (0–0, 3–1, 1–1)	Great Britain	Palaodegar, Asiago

Game reference
10 min	Penalties	10 min
41	Shots	16

== Division II B ==
2025 IIHF U18 World Championship Division II B

Tournament details
- Host country: Bulgaria
- City: Sofia
- Venue: 1 (in 1 host city)
- Dates: 17–23 March 2025
- Teams: 6

Tournament statistics
- Games played: 15
- Goals scored: 106 (7.07 per game)
- Attendance: 2,115 (141 per game)
- Scoring leader: (Spain) Eduardo González (11 points)

Official website
- www.iihf.com

The Division II Group B tournament was played in Sofia, Bulgaria, from 17 to 23 March 2025.

=== Participating teams ===
Team	Qualification
Serbia	Placed 6th in Division II A last year and were relegated
Spain	Placed 2nd in Division II B last year
Bulgaria	Hosts; placed 3rd in Division II B last year
Australia	Placed 4th in Division II B last year
Chinese Taipei	Placed 5th in Division II B last year
Belgium	Placed 1st in Division III A last year and were promoted

=== Final standings ===
Pos	Team	Pld	W	OTW	OTL	L	GF	GA	GD	Pts	Promotion or relegation
1	Spain	5	4	1	0	0	21	7	+14	14	Promoted to the 2026 Division II A
2	Australia	5	2	1	1	1	21	19	+2	9	
3	Chinese Taipei	5	1	1	2	1	16	19	−3	7 (Note: Chinese Taipei 6–5 (OT) Belgium)	
4	Belgium	5	2	0	1	2	25	18	+7	7	
5	Serbia	5	2	0	0	3	15	16	−1	6	
6	Bulgaria (H)	5	0	1	0	4	8	27	−19	2	Relegated to the 2026 Division III A

Source: IIHF
Rules for classification: 1) points; 2) head-to-head points; 3) head-to-head goal difference; 4) head-to-head number of goals scored; 5) result against closest best-ranked team outside tied teams; 6) result against second-best ranked team outside tied teams; 7) seeding before tournament.
(H) Host

=== Match results ===
All times are local (Eastern European Time – UTC+2).

17 March 2025; 13:00	Belgium	8–4 (4–1, 1–3, 3–0)	Australia	Winter Sports Palace, Sofia; Attendance: 45

Game reference
6 min	Penalties	4 min
22	Shots	22

17 March 2025; 16:30	Spain	5–1 (0–0, 4–1, 1–0)	Chinese Taipei	Winter Sports Palace, Sofia; Attendance: 55

Game reference
10 min	Penalties	6 min
41	Shots	19

17 March 2025; 20:00	Bulgaria	1–4 (0–1, 0–2, 1–1)	Serbia	Winter Sports Palace, Sofia; Attendance: 320

Game reference
0 min	Penalties	8 min
29	Shots	27

18 March 2025; 13:00	Chinese Taipei	6–5 OT (2–1, 1–3, 2–1) (OT: 1–0)	Belgium	Winter Sports Palace, Sofia; Attendance: 40

Game reference
8 min	Penalties	12 min
22	Shots	41

18 March 2025; 16:30	Serbia	2–4 (0–0, 1–3, 1–1)	Australia	Winter Sports Palace, Sofia; Attendance: 55

Game reference
10 min	Penalties	10 min
40	Shots	25

18 March 2025; 20:00	Spain	6–0 (3–0, 2–0, 1–0)	Bulgaria	Winter Sports Palace, Sofia; Attendance: 300

Game reference
6 min	Penalties	6 min
46	Shots	11

20 March 2025; 13:00	Serbia	2–4 (1–0, 1–2, 0–2)	Chinese Taipei	Winter Sports Palace, Sofia; Attendance: 40

Game reference
27 min	Penalties	4 min
24	Shots	26

20 March 2025; 16:30	Spain	3–1 (0–0, 0–0, 3–1)	Belgium	Winter Sports Palace, Sofia; Attendance: 60

Game reference
33 min	Penalties	16 min
29	Shots	32

20 March 2025; 20:00	Bulgaria	3–7 (0–2, 1–3, 2–2)	Australia	Winter Sports Palace, Sofia; Attendance: 300

Game reference
6 min	Penalties	10 min
19	Shots	45

22 March 2025; 13:00	Australia	2–3 OT (0–0, 0–1, 2–1) (OT: 0–1)	Spain	Winter Sports Palace, Sofia; Attendance: 65

Game reference
10 min	Penalties	8 min
19	Shots	40

22 March 2025; 16:30	Chinese Taipei	2–3 OT (1–1, 0–0, 1–1) (OT: 0–1)	Bulgaria	Winter Sports Palace, Sofia; Attendance: 300

Game reference
8 min	Penalties	6 min
39	Shots	18

22 March 2025; 20:00	Belgium	3–4 (0–3, 2–1, 1–0)	Serbia	Winter Sports Palace, Sofia; Attendance: 80

Game reference
18 min	Penalties	8 min
24	Shots	17

23 March 2025; 13:00	Australia	4–3 OT (1–1, 2–0, 0–2) (OT: 1–0)	Chinese Taipei	Winter Sports Palace, Sofia; Attendance: 55

Game reference
20 min	Penalties	10 min
24	Shots	38

23 March 2025; 16:30	Bulgaria	1–8 (1–2, 0–4, 0–2)	Belgium	Winter Sports Palace, Sofia; Attendance: 320

Game reference
33 min	Penalties	35 min
18	Shots	38

23 March 2025; 20:00	Serbia	3–4 (1–2, 0–2, 2–0)	Spain	Winter Sports Palace, Sofia; Attendance: 80

Game reference
8 min	Penalties	8 min
28	Shots	25
