= Ollie Betteridge =

English ice hockey player (born 1996)

- Born: 16 January 1996 (age 30) Nottingham, England
- Height: 1.80 m (5 ft 11 in)
- Weight: 80 kg (176 lb; 12 st 8 lb)
- Position: Right wing
- Shoots: Right
- EIHL team Former teams: Nottingham Panthers: Nottingham Lions; Swindon Wildcats; Ferencvárosi TC
- National team: Great Britain
- Playing career: 2011–present

Ollie Betteridge (born 16 January 1996) is an English professional ice hockey player who is a right winger for the Nottingham Panthers of the Elite Ice Hockey League (EIHL).

== Playing career ==
Betteridge previously iced with Hungarian Erste Liga side Ferencvárosi TC.

== International play ==
He represented Great Britain at the 2019 IIHF World Championship and 2021 IIHF World Championship.

== Career statistics ==
=== Regular season and playoffs ===
| | | | Regular season | | | | | Playoffs |
| Season | Team | League | GP | G | A | Pts | PIM | GP | G | A | Pts | PIM |
|---|---|---|---|---|---|---|---|---|---|---|---|---|
| 2011–12 | Nottingham Panthers | EIHL | 5 | 0 | 0 | 0 | 0 | — | — | — | — | — |
| 2012–13 | Nottingham Panthers | EIHL | 1 | 0 | 0 | 0 | 0 | — | — | — | — | — |
| 2012–13 | Nottingham Lions | NIHL 2 | 13 | 15 | 18 | 33 | 14 | — | — | — | — | — |
| 2012–13 | Swindon Wildcats | EPIHL | 20 | 6 | 8 | 14 | 6 | — | — | — | — | — |
| 2013–14 | Nottingham Panthers | EIHL | 2 | 0 | 0 | 0 | 0 | — | — | — | — | — |
| 2013–14 | Swindon Wildcats | EPIHL | 49 | 2 | 10 | 12 | 20 | — | — | — | — | — |
| 2014–15 | Nottingham Panthers | EIHL | 5 | 0 | 0 | 0 | 2 | — | — | — | — | — |
| 2014–15 | Swindon Wildcats | EPIHL | 26 | 3 | 7 | 10 | 10 | — | — | — | — | — |
| 2015–16 | Nottingham Panthers | EIHL | 48 | 2 | 1 | 3 | 6 | 2 | 0 | 0 | 0 | 0 |
| 2016–17 | Nottingham Panthers | EIHL | 52 | 3 | 7 | 10 | 20 | 2 | 0 | 0 | 0 | 0 |
| 2017–18 | Nottingham Panthers | EIHL | 56 | 5 | 9 | 14 | 20 | 4 | 2 | 0 | 2 | 2 |
| 2018–19 | Nottingham Panthers | EIHL | 60 | 8 | 11 | 19 | 22 | 3 | 0 | 0 | 0 | 0 |
| 2019–20 | Nottingham Panthers | EIHL | 46 | 9 | 6 | 15 | 22 | — | — | — | — | — |
| 2020–21 | Nottingham Panthers | EIHL Series | 16 | 5 | 1 | 6 | 2 | — | — | — | — | — |
| 2021–22 | Nottingham Panthers | EIHL | 45 | 13 | 10 | 23 | 10 | — | — | — | — | — |
| 2022–23 | Ferencvárosi TC | Erste Liga | 28 | 10 | 14 | 24 | 6 | 20 | 5 | 5 | 10 | 0 |
| 2023–24 | Nottingham Panthers | EIHL | 23 | 5 | 4 | 9 | 4 | — | — | — | — | — |
| 2024–25 | Nottingham Panthers | EIHL | 54 | 7 | 7 | 14 | 0 | 4 | 0 | 0 | 0 | 0 |
| 2025–26 | Nottingham Panthers | EIHL | 52 | 3 | 5 | 8 | 2 | 2 | 0 | 0 | 0 | 2 |
| EIHL totals | | | 449 | 55 | 60 | 115 | 108 | 17 | 2 | 0 | 2 | 4 |

=== International ===
| Year | Team | Event | GP | G | A | Pts | PIM |
|---|---|---|---|---|---|---|---|
| 2013 | Great Britain U18 | WJC-18 (D2A) | 5 | 0 | 3 | 3 | 4 |
| 2014 | Great Britain U20 | WJC-20 (D1B) | 5 | 1 | 0 | 1 | 0 |
| 2014 | Great Britain U18 | WJC-18 (D2A) | 5 | 0 | 5 | 5 | 0 |
| 2015 | Great Britain U20 | WJC-20 (D2A) | 5 | 2 | 0 | 2 | 0 |
| 2016 | Great Britain U20 | WJC-20 (D1B) | 4 | 1 | 3 | 4 | 0 |
| 2018 | Great Britain | WC (D1A) | 5 | 0 | 1 | 1 | 0 |
| 2019 | Great Britain | WC | 7 | 0 | 0 | 0 | 0 |
| 2020 | Great Britain | OGQ | 3 | 1 | 0 | 1 | 2 |
| 2021 | Great Britain | WC | 7 | 0 | 0 | 0 | 0 |
| 2023 | Great Britain | WC (D1A) | 5 | 0 | 1 | 1 | 0 |
| 2024 | Great Britain | WC | 7 | 1 | 1 | 2 | 0 |
| 2024 | Great Britain | OGQ | 3 | 0 | 0 | 0 | 0 |
| 2025 | Great Britain | WC (D1A) | 5 | 1 | 0 | 1 | 0 |
| 2026 | Great Britain | WC | 7 | 1 | 0 | 1 | 0 |
| Junior totals | | | 24 | 4 | 11 | 15 | 4 |
| Senior totals | | | 49 | 4 | 3 | 7 | 2 |
