= Serbia men's national under-18 ice hockey team =

The Serbia men's national under-18 ice hockey team is the men's national under-18 ice hockey team of Serbia. The team is controlled by the Serbian Ice Hockey Association, a member of the International Ice Hockey Federation. The team represents Serbia at the IIHF World U18 Championships.

== International competitions ==
=== IIHF World U18 Championships ===
- 1999–2006 – as Serbia and Montenegro
- 2007: 6th in Division II Group B
- 2008: 1st in Division III Group B
- 2009: 5th in Division II Group B
- 2010: 4th in Division II Group A
- 2011: 5th in Division II Group A
- 2012: 2nd in Division II Group B
- 2013: 3rd in Division II Group B
- 2014: 3rd in Division II Group B
- 2015: 3rd in Division II Group B
- 2016: 3rd in Division II Group B
- 2017: 3rd in Division II Group B
- 2018: 3rd in Division II Group B
- 2019: 1st in Division II Group B
- 2020: Cancelled due to the COVID-19 pandemic
- 2021: Cancelled due to the COVID-19 pandemic
- 2022: 6th in Division II Group A
- 2023: 4th in Division II Group A
- 2024: 6th in Division II Group A
- 2025: 5th in Division II Group B
- 2026: 3rd in Division II Group B
- 2027: Division II Group B
