= Pionir Ice Hall =

Ice rink in Belgrade, Serbia

- Ледена дворана Пионир
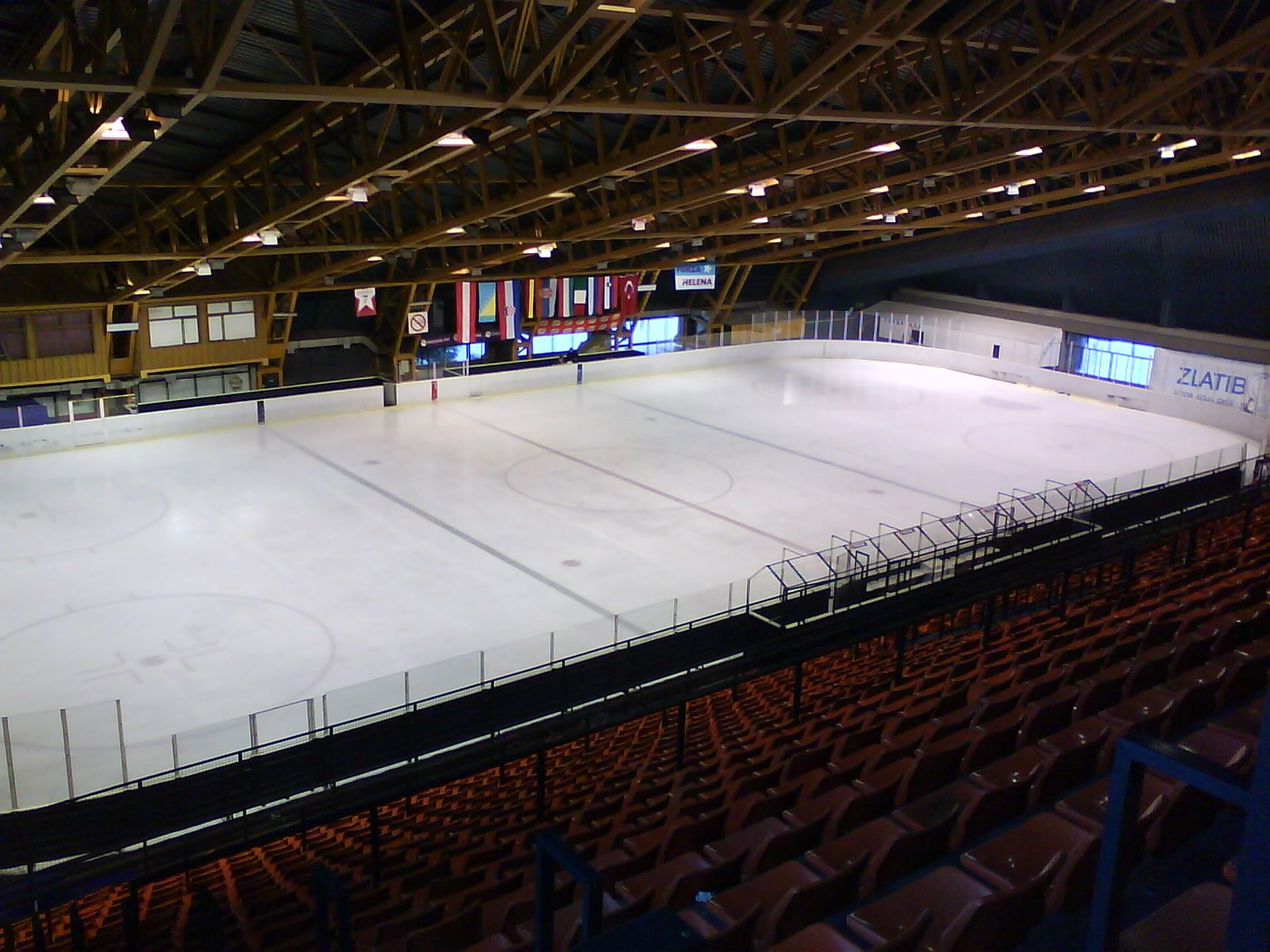
- Inside the Hall in February 2009

- Location within Belgrade
- Location: Belgrade, Serbia
- Coordinates: 44°48′56.08″N 20°29′02.12″E
- Owner: City of Belgrade
- Operator: Tašmajdan SRC
- Capacity: 2,000
- Scoreboard: Yes

Construction
- Opened: 12 March 1978; 48 years ago

Tenants
- HK Partizan; KHK Crvena zvezda HK Taš; KK Beograd-Palilula; KRK Intro Line; KK K-07; KKK Mladost; KK Olimpik; KK Helena Pajović

Website
- www.tasmajdan.rs

Pionir Ice Hall (Serbian: Ледена дворана Пионир, romanized: Ledena dvorana Pionir) is an ice hall in sports complex "Pionir", the youngest of the sports facility within the sports and recreation center "Tašmajdan", and is designed for all sports on the ice. It is located in Belgrade, Serbia. It was opened on March 12, 1978, and has 2 000 seats and it was partially renovated in 2001.

The usable area of the hall is 6000 m^{2}, and the ice area is 1800 m^{2}. It is used for hockey games, figure skating competitions and recreational skating.
During the building of the Hall, 21 km of pipes for freezing were installed under the concrete.

== Events ==
=== Figure skating ===
- September 22–25, 2001 - ISU Junior Grand Prix of Figure Skating-Belgrade Sparrow
- September 12–15, 2002 - ISU Junior Grand Prix of Figure Skating-Belgrade Sparrow
- January 9–12, 2008 - 1st Europa Cup Skate Helena
- February 11–15, 2009 - 2nd Europa Cup Skate Helena
- January 13–17, 2010 - 3rd Europa Cup Skate Helena
- November 20, 2009 - 1st Ice Flower Cup
- November, 2010 - 2nd Ice Flower Cup
- April 17, 2010 - 6th Belgrade Trophy
- January 12–16, 2011 - 4th Europa Cup Skate Helena
- April 1, 2011 - 7th Belgrade Trophy
- January 10–14, 2012 - 5th Europa Cup Skate Helena

=== Ice hockey ===
- January 4–8, 2001 – 2001 IIHF World U20 Championship Division III
- January 5–9, 2002 – 2002 IIHF World U20 Championship Division III
- January 10–16, 2006 – 2006 IIHF World U20 Championship Division II Group B
- January 16–24, 2008 – 2008 IIHF World U20 Championship Division III
- January 12–18, 2013 – 2013 IIHF Ice Hockey U20 World Championship Division II Group B
- March 9–15, 2013 – 2013 IIHF Ice Hockey U18 World Championship Division II Group B
- April 9–15, 2014 – 2014 IIHF Ice Hockey World Championship Division II Group A
- January 19–25, 2025 – 2025 World Junior Ice Hockey Championships – Division II B
- January 18–24, 2026 – 2026 World Junior Ice Hockey Championships – Division II B
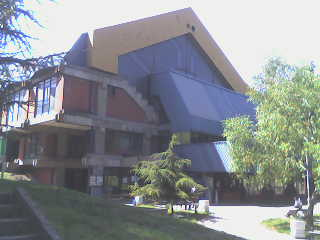
Outside of Hall

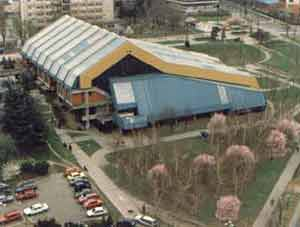
Outside of Hall

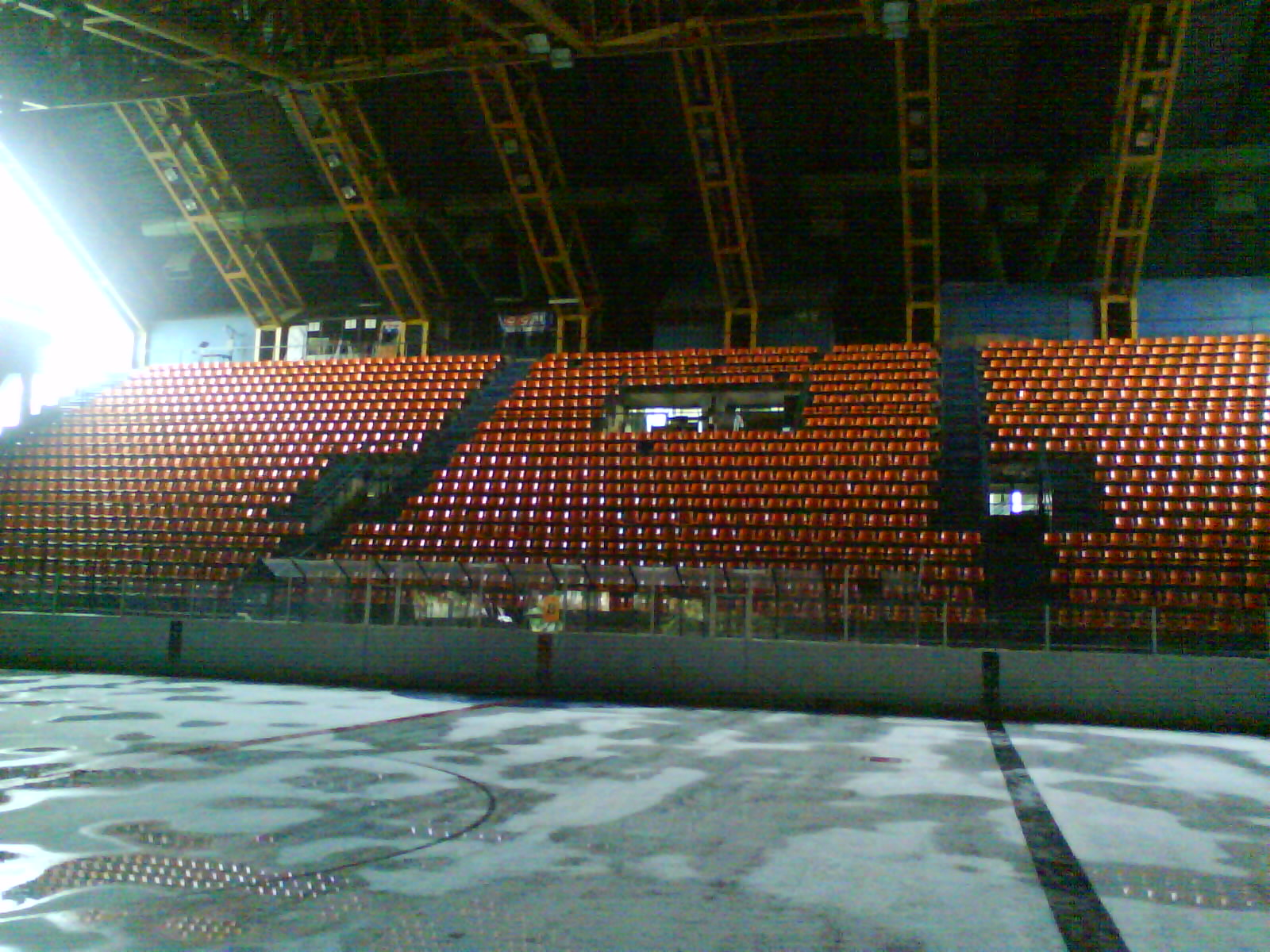
Inside-Without ice

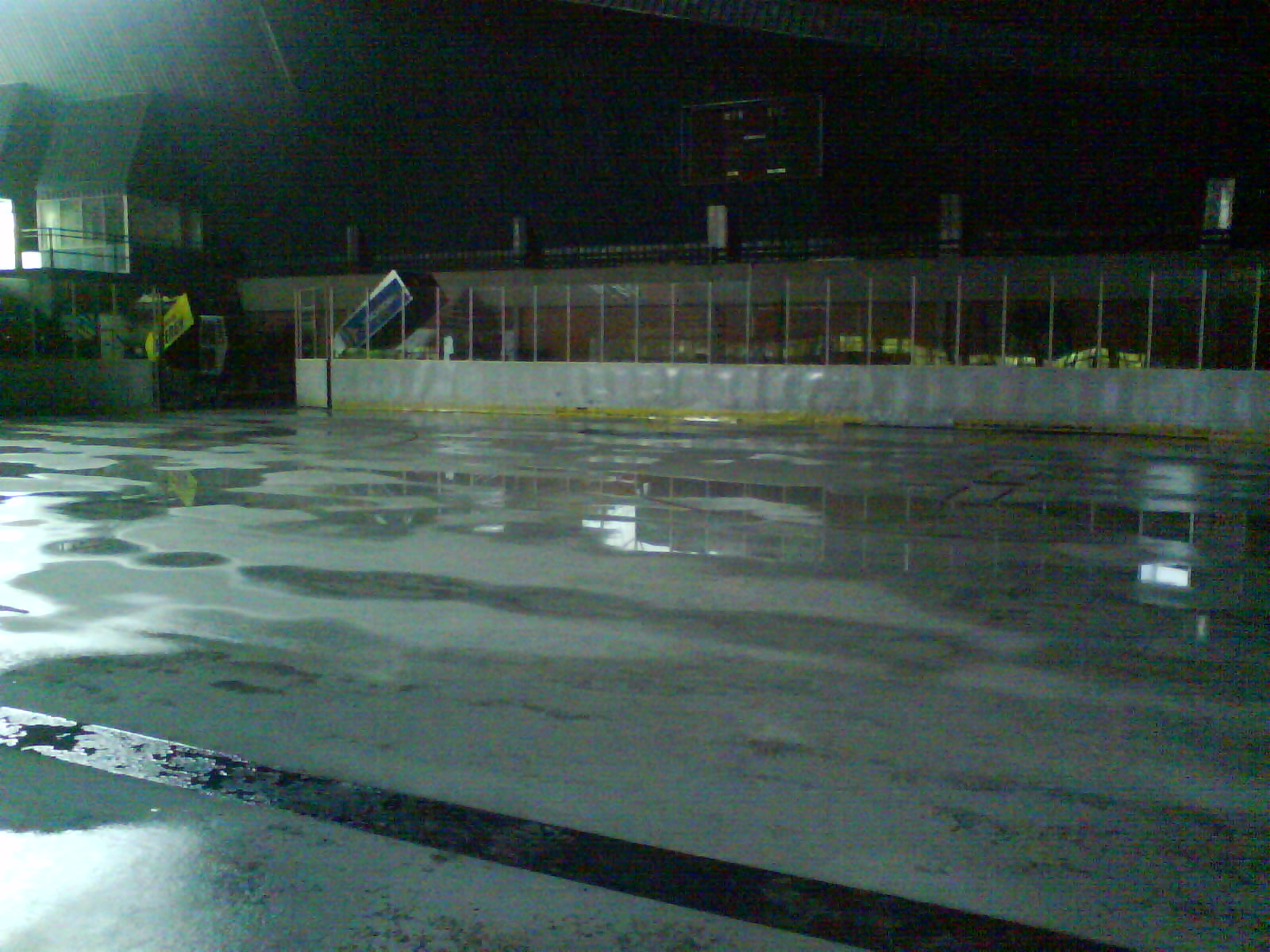
Inside-Without ice

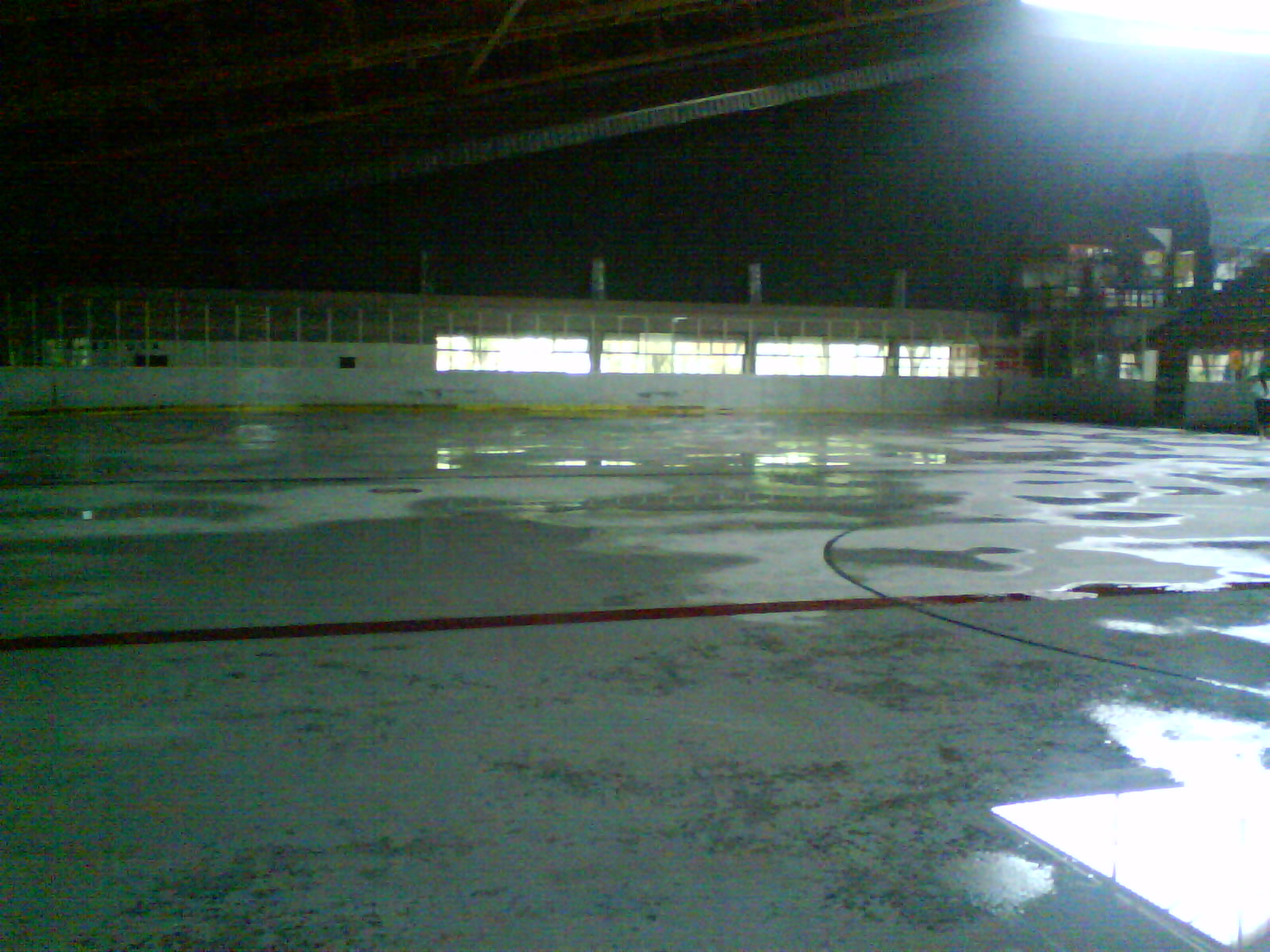
Inside-Without ice

== See also ==
- Pionir Hall
- List of indoor arenas in Serbia
