= Great Britain men's national under-18 ice hockey team =

The Great Britain men's national under-18 ice hockey team is the men's national under-18 ice hockey team of Great Britain. The team is controlled by Ice Hockey UK, a member of the International Ice Hockey Federation. The team represents Great Britain at the IIHF World U18 Championships.

== International competitions ==
=== IIHF European Junior Championships ===
Great Britain competed at the IIHF European Junior Championships from 1967 to 1998.

British Ice Hockey Association secretary Pat Marsh regularly travelled with the team to international events, and stated her favourite tournament was the gold medal victory in Pool-C at the 1986 IIHF European U18 Championship in Barcelona, Spain.

=== IIHF World U18 Championships ===
- 1999: 8th in Pool B
- 2000: 5th in Division I Europe
- 2001: 5th in Division II
- 2002: 3rd in Division II
- 2003: 6th in Division I Group A
- 2004: 1st in Division II Group B
- 2005: 6th in Division I Group A
- 2006: 1st in Division II Group B
- 2007: 6th in Division I Group B
- 2008: 2nd in Division II Group B
- 2009: 1st in Division II Group B
- 2010: 5th in Division I Group B
- 2011: 5th in Division I Group A
- 2012: 4th in Division IIA
- 2013: 4th in Division IIA
- 2014: 5th in Division IIA
- 2015: 3rd in Division IIA
- 2016: 4th in Division IIA
- 2017: 5th in Division IIA
- 2018: 1st in Division IIA
- 2019: 6th in Division IB
- 2020: Cancelled due to the COVID-19 pandemic
- 2021: Cancelled due to the COVID-19 pandemic
- 2022: 3rd in Division IIA
- 2023: 3rd in Division IIA
- 2024: 2nd in Division IIA
- 2025: 2nd in Division IIA
- 2026: in Division IIA
