= Lithuania men's national under-18 ice hockey team =

The Lithuania men's national under-18 ice hockey team is the men's national under-18 ice hockey team of Lithuania. The team is controlled by the Lithuanian Ice Hockey Federation, a member of the International Ice Hockey Federation. The team represents Lithuania at the IIHF World U18 Championships.

== International competitions ==
=== IIHF World U18 Championships ===
- 1999: 3rd in Division I Europe
- 2000: 6th in Division I Europe
- 2001: 8th in Division II
- 2002: 6th in Division III
- 2003: 5th in Division II Group B
- 2004: 4th in Division II Group B
- 2005: 2nd in Division II Group B
- 2006: 2nd in Division II Group B
- 2007: 1st in Division II Group B
- 2008: 3rd in Division I Group A
- 2009: 5th in Division I Group A
- 2010: 6th in Division I Group B
- 2011: 3rd in Division II Group B
- 2012: 3rd in Division II Group A
- 2013: 5th in Division II Group A
- 2014: 1st in Division II Group A
- 2015: 6th in Division I Group B
- 2016: 3rd in Division II Group A
- 2017: 3rd in Division II Group A
- 2018: 2nd in Division II Group A
- 2019: 2nd in Division II Group A
- 2020: Cancelled
- 2021: Cancelled
- 2022: 4th in Division II Group A
- 2023: 1st in Division II Group A
- 2024: 2nd in Division I Group B
