= Belgium men's national under-18 ice hockey team =

The Belgium men's national under-18 ice hockey team is the men's national under-18 ice hockey team of Belgium. The team is controlled by the Royal Belgian Ice Hockey Federation, a member of the International Ice Hockey Federation. The team represents Belgium at the IIHF World U18 Championships.

== International competitions ==
=== IIHF World U18 Championships ===
- 1999: 3rd in Division II Europe
- 2000: 4th in Division II Europe
- 2001: 5th in Division III
- 2002: 4th in Division III
- 2003: 4th in Division II Group A
- 2004: 6th in Division II Group A
- 2005: 2nd in Division III
- 2006: 4th in Division II Group A
- 2007: 4th in Division II Group A
- 2008: 4th in Division II Group A
- 2009: 3rd in Division II Group B
- 2010: 5th in Division II Group B
- 2011: 6th in Division II Group B
- 2012: 1st in Division III
- 2013: 4th in Division II Group B
- 2014: 4th in Division II Group B
- 2015: 4th in Division II Group B
- 2016: 5th in Division II Group B
- 2017: 6th in Division II Group B
- 2018: 1st in Division III Group A
- 2019: 6th in Division II Group B
- 2020:Cancelled due to the COVID-19 pandemic
- 2021:Cancelled due to the COVID-19 pandemic
- 2022: 2nd in Division III Group A
- 2023: 6th in Division II Group B
- 2024: 1st in Division III Group A
