= Netherlands men's national under-18 ice hockey team =

Netherlands
- Nickname: Oranje (Orange)
- Association: Netherlands Ice Hockey Association
- Head coach: (Canada) Robb Serviss
- Captain: Tony Ras
- Most games: Levi Houkes
- Top scorer: Peter van Biezen
- Most points: Bert van den Braak
- Home stadium: Thialf
- Team colors
- IIHF code: NED

IIHF World U18 Championship
- Appearances: 10 (first in 2001)
- Best result: 22nd (2008)

The Netherlands men's national under-18 ice hockey team is controlled by the Netherlands Ice Hockey Association and represents the Netherlands in international under-18 ice hockey competitions. The Netherlands plays in Division II of the IIHF World U18 Championships, and hosted the 2012 IIHF World U18 Championships Division II Group A in Heerenveen.
