= Croatia men's national under-18 ice hockey team =

The Croatia men's national under-18 ice hockey team is the men's national under-18 ice hockey team of Croatia. The team is controlled by the Croatian Ice Hockey Federation, a member of the International Ice Hockey Federation. The team represents Croatia at the IIHF World U18 Championships.

== International competitions ==
=== IIHF World U18 Championships ===
- 1999: 7th in Division I Europe
- 2000: 1st in Division II Europe
- 2001:: 6th in Division II
- 2002: 7th in Division II
- 2003: 3rd in Division II Group A
- 2004: 3rd in Division II Group B
- 2005: 3rd in Division II Group B
- 2006: 4th in Division II Group B
- 2007: 3rd in Division II Group B
- 2008: 3rd in Division II Group A
- 2009: 4th in Division II Group A
- 2010: 3rd in Division II Group A
- 2011: 3rd in Division II Group A
- 2012: 5th in Division IIA
- 2013: 2nd in Division IIA
- 2014: 3rd in Division IIA
- 2015: 5th in Division IIA
- 2016: 5th in Division IIA
- 2017: 6th in Division IIA
- 2018: 2nd in Division IIB
- 2019: 4th in Division IIB
- 2020:Cancelled due to the COVID-19 pandemic
- 2021:Cancelled due to the COVID-19 pandemic
- 2022: 1st in Division IIB
- 2023: 2nd in Division IIA
- 2024: 5th in Division IIA
- 2025: 4th in Division IIA
- 2026: Division IIA
