= Mongolia men's national under-18 ice hockey team =

Mongolia U18
- Association: Mongolian Ice Hockey Federation
- Team colors
- IIHF code: MGL

First international
- New Zealand 5 – 1 Mongolia (Bangkok, Thailand; 25 March 2000)

Biggest win
- Mongolia 37 – 0 Macau (Samarkand, Uzbekistan; 25 April 2024)

Biggest defeat
- Australia 33 – 0 Mongolia (Taipei, Chinese Taipei; 2 March 2009)

IIHF World U18 Championship
- Appearances: 3 (first in 2008)
- Best result: 42nd (2008)

IIHF Asian Oceanic U18 Championship
- Appearances: 3 (first in 2000)
- Best result: 4th (2002)

IIHF U18 Asia and Oceania Championship
- Appearances: 3 (first in 2023)
- Best result: (2023, 2024, 2026)

International record (W–L–T)
- 8–20–1

The Mongolia men's national under-18 ice hockey team is the men's national under-18 ice hockey team of Mongolia. The team is controlled by the Mongolian Ice Hockey Federation, a member of the International Ice Hockey Federation.

== History ==
The Mongolia men's national under-18 ice hockey team played its first game in 2000 against New Zealand during the 2000 IIHF Asian Oceanic Junior U18 Championship Division II tournament being held in Bangkok, Thailand. Mongolia lost the game 1–5 and finished the tournament in last place. The following year the team finished first in the Division II tournament at the 2001 IIHF Asian Oceanic U18 Championship and were set to gain promotion to Division I but due to a format change both divisions were merged for the 2002 IIHF Asian Oceanic U18 Championship. During the tournament Mongolia achieved their largest victory in international participation when they defeated Thailand 12–1. At the 2002 IIHF Asian Oceanic U18 Championship Mongolia finished fourth after winning two of their five games, beating both Chinese Taipei and Thailand. After a six-year absence from international competition the under-18 team returned to compete in the 2008 IIHF World U18 Championships Division III Group A being held in Mexico City, Mexico. They finished in last place after losing all five of their games. The following year they again finished in last place and also suffered their largest defeat in international competition after losing to Australia 0–33. In 2011 Mongolian under-18 were set to play at their fourth World Championships however the Mongolian Ice Hockey Federation had to withdraw both the under-18 team and the men's senior team from their respective tournaments due to financial reasons.

== International competitions ==
- 2000 IIHF Asian Oceanic Junior U18 Championship. Finish: 4th in Division II (8th overall)
- 2001 IIHF Asian Oceanic U18 Championship. Finish: 1st in Division II (5th overall)
- 2002 IIHF Asian Oceanic U18 Championship. Finish: 4th
- 2008 IIHF World U18 Championships. Finish: 5th in Division III Group A (43rd overall)
- 2009 IIHF World U18 Championships. Finish: 5th in Division III Group A (43rd overall)
- 2010 IIHF World U18 Championships. Finish: 5th in Division III Group A (44th overall)
- 2023 IIHF Ice Hockey U18 Asia and Oceania Championship. Finish: 3rd place
- 2024 Finish: 3rd place
- 2026 Finish: 3rd place

=== 2000 ===
25 March 2000; 20:00	Mongolia	1 – 5 (0–2, 0–1, 1–2)	New Zealand	Bangkok; Attendance: 350

Game reference

26 March 2000; 16:00	Mongolia	2 – 6 (1–2, 1–3, 0–1)	Chinese Taipei	Bangkok; Attendance: 300

Game reference

28 March 2000; 18:00	Thailand	4 – 4 (1–0, 1–2, 2–2)	Mongolia	Bangkok; Attendance: 300

Game reference

=== 2001 ===
10 March 2001; 14:00	Thailand	1–12 (1–4, 0–3, 0–5)	Mongolia	Seoul; Attendance: 300

Game reference

=== 2002 ===
10 March 2002; 11:30	Chinese Taipei	2–5 (1–1, 0–3, 1–1)	Mongolia	Auckland; Attendance: 300

Game reference

11 March 2002; 19:15	Mongolia	10–4 (6–0, 1–2, 3–2)	Thailand	Auckland; Attendance: 300

Game reference

12 March 2002; 12:30	Australia	9–2 (3–0, 2–2, 4–4)	Mongolia	Auckland; Attendance: 300

Game reference

14 March 2002; 15:15	Mongolia	1–17 (1–5, 0–5, 0–7)	China	Auckland; Attendance: 300

Game reference

15 March 2002; 15:15	Mongolia	1–14 (0–2, 0–7, 1–5)	New Zealand	Auckland; Attendance: 300

Game reference

=== 2008 ===
2 March 2008; 16:00	New Zealand	29–0 (7–0, 10–0, 12–0)	Mongolia	San Jeronimo Arena; Attendance: 550

Game reference

6 March 2008; 19:00	Mexico	10–1 (5–0, 0–1, 5–0)	Mongolia	San Jeronimo Arena; Attendance: 326

Game reference

7 March 2008; 16:00	Mongolia	2–12 (1–5, 0–4, 1–3)	South Africa	San Jeronimo Arena; Attendance: 145

Game reference

8 March 2008; 16:00	Chinese Taipei	13–4 (5–0, 5–0, 3–4)	Mongolia	San Jeronimo Arena; Attendance: 375

Game reference

=== 2009 ===
March 2, 2009; 16:00	Australia	33–0	Mongolia	Tapei Annex Ice Rink; Attendance: 150

	Referee: Park GJ (South Korea)
W Darge (EQ) 00:53; W Darge (EQ) 04:15; J McFadden (EQ) 04:53; K Dolling (EQ) 10:29; R Outred (EQ) 10:41; E Sewell (EQ) 11:45; B Cliff (EQ) 12:09; J McFadden (EQ) 13:04; E Sewell (EQ) 15:32; A McKenzie (EQ) 16:16; S Best (EQ) 17:16; J Kyros (EQ) 17:46; S Best (EQ) 18:20; A McKenzie (EQ) 21:40; B Cliff (EQ) 23:56; J Kyros (EQ) 25:07; S Renner (EQ) 26:44; S McGregor (EQ) 30:33; K Dolling (EQ) 31:29; W Darge (EQ) 34:07; R McLeod (EQ) 34:22; W Darge (EQ) 38:27; W Darge (EQ) 38:45; K Dolling (EQ) 41:11; W Darge (EQ) 44:00; J McFadden (EQ) 47:15; C Vickers (PP) 51:35; S Austin (EQ) 52:34; A McKenzie (EQ) 53:11; W Darge (EQ) 53:38; B Funes (EQ) 58:17; C Vickers (EQ) 59:14; R Outred (EQ) 59:53 / Goals	Referee: Park GJ (South Korea)

March 3, 2009; 16:00	Mongolia	1–19	New Zealand	Tapei Annex Ice Rink; Attendance: 100

	Referee: K Hokkanen (Japan)
Z Batdorj (PP) 43:12 / Goals / J Challis (PP) 04:31; J Challis (PP) 13:38; H King (PP) 14:02; A Gouldstone (PP) 25:19; L Pickering (EQ) 27:22; D Dickson (EQ) 29:01; D Dunlop (EQ) 30:30; H Dunlop (PP) 34:15; G Lloyd (EQ) 35:14; J Challis (EQ) 36:08; H Dunlop (EQ) 37:04; J Challis (PP) 38:34; D Dickson (EQ) 39:24; J Challis (EQ) 47:00; D Dunlop (EQ) 47:29; D Dickson (PP) 60:13; J Challis (EQ) 51:11; C McDermid (EQ) 54:38; M Attwell (PP) 58:54	Referee: K Hokkanen (Japan)

March 5, 2009; 16:00	South Africa	12–3	Mongolia	Tapei Annex Ice Rink; Attendance: 120

	Referee: R van Gameren (Germany)
C Labuschagne (PP) 05:15; J Goodwin (EQ) 11:28; U Samaai (SH) 13:54; Kyle van Rooyen (EQ) 17:08; U Samaai (SH) 20:50; C Labuschagne (EQ) 29:50; C Labuschagne (EQ) 32:06; C Labuschagne (EQ) 32:31; C Williams (SH) 45:44; W du Preez (EQ) 54:38; C Labuschagne (EQ) 55:03; J Johnson (PP) 57:51 / Goals / S Zagdjav (EQ) 27:11; A Ganbat (EQ) 38:45; T Dondov (EQ) 40:54	Referee: R van Gameren (Germany)

=== 2010 ===
9 March 2010; 15:30	Mongolia	1–18 (0–6, 1–7, 0–5)	Chinese Taipei

10 March 2010; 19:00	China	27–0 (8–0, 14–0, 5–0)	Mongolia

11 March 2010; 19:00	Turkey	19–1 (7–0, 7–1, 5–0)	Mongolia

12 March 2010; 19:00	Bulgaria	14–0 (4–0, 4–0, 6–0)	Mongolia

=== 2023 ===
All times are local (UTC+8)

11 March 2023; 20:30	Mongolia	5-0	Iran	AIC_Steppe_Arena, Mongolia

Game reference

12 March 2023; 20:30	Mongolia	10-2	United Arab Emirates	AIC_Steppe_Arena, Mongolia

Game reference

14 March 2023; 20:30	Mongolia	4-7	Uzbekistan	AIC_Steppe_Arena, Mongolia

Game reference

15 March 2023; 20:30	Turkmenistan	6-4	Mongolia	AIC_Steppe_Arena, Mongolia

Game reference

17 March 2023; 20:30	Thailand	4-6	Mongolia	AIC_Steppe_Arena, Mongolia

Game reference

=== 2024 ===
23 April 2024; 19:30	India	0-32 (0–10, 0–9, 0–13)	Mongolia	Ice Rink, Samarkand

Game reference

25 April 2024; 19:30	Mongolia	37-0 (13–0, 12–0, 12–0)	Macau	Ice Rink, Samarkand; Attendance: 70

Game reference
6 min	Penalties	2 min
75	Shots	5

26 April 2024; 19:30	Indonesia	4-9 (2–3, 1–3, 1–3)	Mongolia	Ice Rink, Samarkand; Attendance: 250

Game reference
16 min	Penalties	2 min
16	Shots	62

28 April 2024; 11:00	Mongolia	12-3 (7–3, 1–0, 4–0)	United Arab Emirates	Ice Rink, Samarkand; Attendance: 300

Game reference
33 min	Penalties	37 min
42	Shots	20

==== Semi Final ====
29 April 2024; 19:30	Thailand	7-4 (0–1, 1–4, 3–2)	Mongolia	Humo Arena, Tashkent; Attendance: 50

Game reference
12 min	Penalties	14 min
37	Shots	41

=== Third place game ===
30 April 2024; 16:00	Mongolia	4-2 (2–0, 2–1, 0–1)	United Arab Emirates	Humo Arena, Tashkent; Attendance: 80

Game reference
10 min	Penalties	10 min
38	Shots	26

=== 2026 ===
27 April 2026; 13:00	Macau	0–18 (0–6, 0–4, 0–8)	Mongolia	Bishkek Arena, Bishkek; Attendance: 500

Game reference
0 min	Penalties	2 min
2	Shots	61

28 April 2026; 13:00	Mongolia	5–2 (1–1, 3–1, 1–0)	Indonesia	Bishkek Arena, Bishkek; Attendance: 100

Game reference
10 min	Penalties	12 min
31	Shots	15

30 April 2026; 13:00	Uzbekistan	7-2 (3–0, 0–0, 4–2)	Mongolia	Bishkek Arena, Bishkek; Attendance: 100

Game reference
8 min	Penalties	8 min
33	Shots	19

== Semifinals ==
2 May 2026; 20:00	Kyrgyzstan	9–0 (3–0, 3–0, 3–0)	Mongolia	Bishkek Arena, Bishkek; Attendance: 1,000

Game reference
49 min	Penalties	28 min
56	Shots	17

== Third place game ==
3 May 2026; 16:30	Mongolia	7-2 (4–1, 1–0, 2–1)	Indonesia	Bishkek Arena, Bishkek; Attendance: 300

Game reference
8 min	Penalties	10 min
17	Shots	21
