= 2007 IIHF World U18 Championship Division III =

Tournament details
- Host country: China
- Dates: 5 – 11 March 2007
- Teams: 6

The 2007 IIHF World U18 Championship Division III was an international under-18 ice hockey tournament run by the International Ice Hockey Federation. The Division III tournament made up the fourth level of competition at the 2007 IIHF World U18 Championships and took place between 5 and 11 March 2007 in Beijing, China. The tournament was won by Spain who upon winning gained promotion, along with China who finished in second place, to Division II of the 2007 IIHF World U18 Championships.

== Overview ==
The 2007 IIHF World U18 Championship Division III began on 5 March 2007 in Beijing, China. New Zealand and South Africa both returned to compete in the Division III competition after missing promotion at the previous years World Championships. Turkey gained promotion back to Division III after winning the qualification game against Bulgaria which was held in January 2007. Iceland and Spain entered the Division III competition after being relegated from the Division II tournaments of the 2006 IIHF World U18 Championships. China returned to the World U18 Championships, having last played in the 2003 IIHF World U18 Championship Division III Group A tournament.

Spain finished first after winning all five of their games and gained promotion back to Division II for the 2008 IIHF World U18 Championships. China who finished in second place also gained promotion to Division II, while Iceland finished third after winning three of their five games of the tournament. Alejandro Pedraz of Spain finished as the tournaments top scoring after recording 26 points including 17 goals and nine assists. Spain's Ander Alcaine finished as the tournaments leading goaltender with a save percentage of 0.877.

== Division III Qualification ==
The Division III Qualiciation tournament was held on 28 January 2007 in İzmit, Turkey. The tournament consisted of a single game between Turkey and Bulgaria who were relegated to the qualification tournament after they finished fifth and sixth in the 2006 IIHF World U18 Championship Division III tournament. Turkey won the game 3–2 in a shootout and qualified for the 2007 IIHF World U18 Championship Division III tournament.

| 28 January 2007; 19:00 | Turkey | 3 – 2 GWS (2–1, 0–1, 0–0) (OT 0–0) (SO: 1–0) | Bulgaria | Izmit Ice Rink; Attendance: 200 |

Game reference

== Standings ==
| Pos | Team | Pld | W | OTW | OTL | L | GF | GA | GD | Pts | Promotion |
|---|---|---|---|---|---|---|---|---|---|---|---|
| 1 | Spain | 5 | 5 | 0 | 0 | 0 | 54 | 9 | +45 | 15 | Promoted to Division II for 2008 |
| 2 | China | 5 | 4 | 0 | 0 | 1 | 46 | 16 | +30 | 12 | Promoted to Division II for 2008 |
| 3 | Iceland | 5 | 3 | 0 | 0 | 2 | 41 | 17 | +24 | 9 | |
| 4 | New Zealand | 5 | 2 | 0 | 0 | 3 | 30 | 25 | +5 | 6 | |
| 5 | South Africa | 5 | 1 | 0 | 0 | 4 | 11 | 53 | −42 | 3 | |
| 6 | Turkey | 5 | 0 | 0 | 0 | 5 | 6 | 68 | −62 | 0 | |

=== Fixtures ===
All times local.

| 5 March 2007; 13:00 | South Africa | 1–18 (0–9, 1–4, 0–5) | Spain | Hosa Skating Center; Attendance: 101 |

Game reference

| 5 March 2007; 16:30 | China | 11–2 (2–1, 5–0, 4–1) | New Zealand | Hosa Skating Center; Attendance: 340 |

Game reference

| 5 March 2007; 20:00 | Iceland | 16–1 (5–1, 4–0, 7–0) | Turkey | Hosa Skating Center; Attendance: 98 |

Game reference

| 6 March 2007; 13:00 | Spain | 5–1 (0–0, 2–1, 3–0) | New Zealand | Hosa Skating Center; Attendance: 111 |

Game reference

| 6 March 2007; 16:30 | Turkey | 0–15 (0–5, 0–5, 0–5) | China | Hosa Skating Center; Attendance: 121 |

Game reference

| 6 March 2007; 20:00 | Iceland | 14–2 (4–0, 7–1, 3–1) | South Africa | Hosa Skating Center; Attendance: 134 |

| 8 March 2007; 13:00 | South Africa | 1–9 (0–2, 1–4, 0–3) | New Zealand | Hosa Skating Center; Attendance: 101 |

Game reference

| 8 March 2007; 16:30 | Iceland | 3–6 (0–5, 1–0, 2–1) | China | Hosa Skating Center; Attendance: 456 |

Game reference

| 8 March 2007; 20:00 | Spain | 16–0 (5–0, 6–0, 5–0) | Turkey | Hosa Skating Center; Attendance: 102 |

Game reference

| 9 March 2007; 13:00 | Turkey | 2–5 (1–1, 0–1, 1–3) | South Africa | Hosa Skating Center; Attendance: 102 |

| 9 March 2007; 16:30 | New Zealand | 2–5 (0–3, 0–1, 2–1) | Iceland | Hosa Skating Center; Attendance: 156 |

Game reference

| 9 March 2007; 20:00 | China | 4–9 (2–2, 1–4, 1–3) | Spain | Hosa Skating Center; Attendance: 900 |

Game reference

| 11 March 2007; 13:00 | New Zealand | 16–3 (2–0, 4–1, 10–2) | Turkey | Hosa Skating Center; Attendance: 102 |

Game reference

| 11 March 2007; 16:30 | South Africa | 2–10 (0–5, 0–4, 2–1) | China | Hosa Skating Center; Attendance: 800 |

Game reference

| 11 March 2007; 20:00 | Spain | 6–3 (0–1, 2–2, 4–0) | Iceland | Hosa Skating Center; Attendance: 900 |

Game reference

== Scoring leaders ==
List shows the top ten skaters sorted by points, then goals.

| Player | GP | G | A | Pts | +/− | PIM | POS |
|---|---|---|---|---|---|---|---|
| (Spain) Alejandro Pedraz | 5 | 17 | 9 | 26 | +22 | 29 | F |
| (Spain) Juan Munoz | 5 | 8 | 12 | 20 | +18 | 12 | F |
| (Spain) Adrian Betran | 5 | 8 | 8 | 16 | +24 | 2 | F |
| (New Zealand) Martin James Lee | 5 | 9 | 6 | 15 | +10 | 16 | F |
| (China) Li Zhengyu | 5 | 8 | 6 | 14 | +11 | 0 | F |
| (China) Chen Ling | 5 | 7 | 6 | 13 | +7 | 16 | F |
| (Iceland) Egill Thormodsson | 5 | 7 | 5 | 12 | +7 | 0 | F |
| (Iceland) Thorsteinn Bjornsson | 5 | 4 | 8 | 12 | +7 | 2 | F |
| (New Zealand) Christopher Eaden | 5 | 6 | 4 | 10 | +6 | 0 | F |
| (Iceland) Petur Maack | 5 | 6 | 4 | 10 | +7 | 6 | F |

== Leading goaltenders ==
Only the top five goaltenders, based on save percentage, who have played 40% of their team's minutes are included in this list.

| Player | MIP | SOG | GA | GAA | SVS% | SO |
|---|---|---|---|---|---|---|
| (Spain) Ander Alcaine | 210:50 | 65 | 8 | 2.28 | 87.69 | 0 |
| (Iceland) Aron Stefansson | 259:04 | 99 | 15 | 3.47 | 84.85 | 0 |
| (China) Han Pengfei | 243:07 | 83 | 14 | 3.46 | 83.13 | 0 |
| (New Zealand) Zak Nothling | 200:12 | 99 | 17 | 5.09 | 82.83 | 0 |
| (South Africa) Zayne Campbell-Hall | 178:45 | 129 | 23 | 7.72 | 82.17 | 0 |
