= 2023 IIHF World U18 Championship Division III =

2023 IIHF U18 World Championship Division III
Tournament details
- Host countries: Iceland; South Africa
- Venues: 2 (in 2 host cities)
- Dates: 12–18 March (Group A); 13–16 March (Group B)
- Teams: 10

The 2023 IIHF U18 World Championship Division III was two international under-18 men's ice hockey tournaments organised by the International Ice Hockey Federation. The Division III A and Division III B tournaments represent the sixth and the seventh tier of the IIHF World U18 Championships.

In the 'B' tournament, New Zealand finished in first place, securing promotion to the 'A' tournament next year. Returning to play, after missing three years of action, the kiwis needed Thailand to defeat Hong Kong on the final day to have a chance. The hosts, South Africa, finished last but will not face relegation as this is the lowest tier. It did, however, mark the second of three events to be hosted in Cape Town this year, a very unusual accomplishment for any IIHF nation.

== Division III A ==
2023 IIHF U18 World Championship Division III A

Tournament details
- Host country: Iceland
- Venue: 1 (in 1 host city)
- Dates: 12–18 March
- Teams: 6

Tournament statistics
- Games played: 15
- Goals scored: 144 (9.6 per game)
- Attendance: 2,995 (200 per game)
- Scoring leader: (Mexico) Luis Valencia (15 points)

Official website
- www.iihf.com

The Division III A tournament was played in Akureyri, Iceland, from 12 to 18 March 2023.

=== Participants ===
Team	Qualification
Iceland	Hosts, placed 3rd in Division III A last year.
Israel	Placed 4th in Division III A last year.
Mexico	Placed 5th in Division III A last year.
Turkey	Placed 6th in Division III A last year.
Bosnia and Herzegovina	Placed 1st in Division III B last year and were promoted.
Luxembourg	Placed 2nd in Division III B last year and were promoted.

=== Standings ===
Pos	Team	Pld	W	OTW	OTL	L	GF	GA	GD	Pts	Promotion or relegation
1	Israel	5	4	0	0	1	39	5	+34	12 (Note: Iceland 1–5 Israel)	Promoted to the 2024 Division II B
2	Iceland (H)	5	4	0	0	1	36	12	+24	12	
3	Turkey	5	3	0	0	2	27	15	+12	9 (Note: Turkey 5–3 Mexico)	
4	Mexico	5	3	0	0	2	31	16	+15	9	
5	Bosnia and Herzegovina	5	1	0	0	4	8	29	−21	3	
6	Luxembourg	5	0	0	0	5	3	67	−64	0	Relegated to the 2024 Division III B

Source: IIHF
Rules for classification: 1) points; 2) head-to-head points; 3) head-to-head goal difference; 4) head-to-head number of goals scored; 5) result against closest best-ranked team outside tied teams; 6) result against second-best ranked team outside tied teams; 7) seeding before tournament.
(H) Host

=== Results ===
All times are local (UTC±0).

12 March 2023; 13:00	Israel	3–1 (0–0, 0–1, 3–0)	Turkey	Skautahöllin, Akureyri; Attendance: 35

Game reference
12 min	Penalties	12 min
29	Shots	38

12 March 2023; 16:30	Luxembourg	0–6 (0–2, 0–2, 0–2)	Bosnia and Herzegovina	Skautahöllin, Akureyri; Attendance: 42

Game reference
10 min	Penalties	10 min
29	Shots	31

12 March 2023; 20:00	Mexico	3–5 (1–1, 2–0, 0–4)	Iceland	Skautahöllin, Akureyri; Attendance: 523

Game reference
18 min	Penalties	12 min
24	Shots	40

13 March 2023; 13:00	Turkey	15–1 (2–0, 10–0, 3–1)	Luxembourg	Skautahöllin, Akureyri; Attendance: 15

Game reference
33 min	Penalties	10 min
74	Shots	14

13 March 2023; 16:30	Israel	2–3 (1–1, 1–2, 0–0)	Mexico	Skautahöllin, Akureyri; Attendance: 50

Game reference
12 min	Penalties	8 min
45	Shots	31

13 March 2023; 20:00	Iceland	9–0 (1–0, 3–0, 5–0)	Bosnia and Herzegovina	Skautahöllin, Akureyri; Attendance: 457

Game reference
2 min	Penalties	0 min
63	Shots	7

15 March 2023; 13:00	Israel	18–0 (5–0, 6–0, 7–0)	Luxembourg	Skautahöllin, Akureyri; Attendance: 17

Game reference
8 min	Penalties	12 min
63	Shots	20

15 March 2023; 16:30	Mexico	7–2 (2–0, 2–1, 3–1)	Bosnia and Herzegovina	Skautahöllin, Akureyri; Attendance: 35

Game reference
14 min	Penalties	8 min
44	Shots	23

15 March 2023; 20:00	Iceland	8–4 (3–1, 3–2, 2–1)	Turkey	Skautahöllin, Akureyri; Attendance: 535

Game reference
10 min	Penalties	14 min
46	Shots	28

16 March 2023; 13:00	Bosnia and Herzegovina	0–11 (0–4, 0–3, 0–4)	Israel	Skautahöllin, Akureyri; Attendance: 18

Game reference
10 min	Penalties	6 min
21	Shots	55

16 March 2023; 16:30	Turkey	5–3 (2–0, 2–2, 1–1)	Mexico	Skautahöllin, Akureyri; Attendance: 40

Game reference
12 min	Penalties	8 min
30	Shots	27

16 March 2023; 20:00	Luxembourg	0–13 (0–3, 0–3, 0–7)	Iceland	Skautahöllin, Akureyri; Attendance: 542

Game reference
10 min	Penalties	4 min
16	Shots	59

18 March 2023; 11:00	Bosnia and Herzegovina	0–2 (0–0, 0–1, 0–1)	Turkey	Skautahöllin, Akureyri; Attendance: 20

Game reference
8 min	Penalties	6 min
21	Shots	50

18 March 2023; 14:30	Mexico	15–2 (3–1, 5–1, 7–0)	Luxembourg	Skautahöllin, Akureyri; Attendance: 38

Game reference
12 min	Penalties	10 min
51	Shots	34

18 March 2023; 18:00	Iceland	1–5 (0–2, 0–0, 1–3)	Israel	Skautahöllin, Akureyri; Attendance: 628

Game reference
8 min	Penalties	41 min
37	Shots	34

== Division III B ==
2023 IIHF U18 World Championship Division III B

Tournament details
- Host country: South Africa
- Venue: 1 (in 1 host city)
- Dates: 13–16 March
- Teams: 4

Tournament statistics
- Games played: 6
- Goals scored: 46 (7.67 per game)
- Attendance: 880 (147 per game)
- Scoring leader: (Hong Kong) Darren Cheung (7 points)

Official website
- www.iihf.com

The Division III B tournament was played in Cape Town, South Africa, from 13 to 16 March 2023.

=== Participants ===
Team	Qualification
New Zealand	Placed 6th in 2019 Division III A and were relegated.
Hong Kong	Placed 2nd in 2019 Division III B.
South Africa	Hosts, placed 3rd in Division III B last year.
Thailand	First time participating in tournament.

=== Standings ===
Pos	Team	Pld	W	OTW	OTL	L	GF	GA	GD	Pts	Promotion
1	New Zealand	3	2	0	0	1	15	8	+7	6 (Note: New Zealand 3 points, +1 GD; Hong Kong 3 points, 0 GD; Thailand 3 points, –1 GD)	Promoted to the 2024 Division III A
2	Hong Kong	3	2	0	0	1	13	11	+2	6	
3	Thailand	3	2	0	0	1	14	9	+5	6	
4	South Africa (H)	3	0	0	0	3	4	18	−14	0	

Source: IIHF
Rules for classification: 1) points; 2) head-to-head points; 3) head-to-head goal difference; 4) head-to-head number of goals scored; 5) result against closest best-ranked team outside tied teams; 6) result against second-best ranked team outside tied teams; 7) seeding before tournament.
(H) Host

=== Results ===
All times are local (UTC+2).

13 March 2023; 14:00	New Zealand	4–2 (3–0, 1–2, 0–0)	Thailand	Ice Station, Cape Town; Attendance: 50

Game reference
14 min	Penalties	10 min
36	Shots	30

13 March 2023; 19:00	South Africa	2–4 (0–1, 1–0, 1–3)	Hong Kong	Ice Station, Cape Town; Attendance: 200

Game reference
10 min	Penalties	4 min
15	Shots	44

14 March 2023; 14:00	New Zealand	4–5 (1–1, 1–2, 2–2)	Hong Kong	Ice Station, Cape Town; Attendance: 30

Game reference
2 min	Penalties	26 min
33	Shots	26

14 March 2023; 19:00	Thailand	7–1 (5–0, 1–1, 1–0)	South Africa	Ice Station, Cape Town; Attendance: 150

Game reference
10 min	Penalties	16 min
45	Shots	23

16 March 2023; 14:00	Hong Kong	4–5 (0–2, 2–1, 2–2)	Thailand	Ice Station, Cape Town; Attendance: 50

Game reference
18 min	Penalties	14 min
29	Shots	31

16 March 2023; 19:00	South Africa	1–7 (0–1, 1–3, 0–3)	New Zealand	Ice Station, Cape Town; Attendance: 400

Game reference
10 min	Penalties	10 min
8	Shots	60
