= 2026 IIHF U18 Asia Cup =

Tournament details
- Host country: Kyrgyzstan
- City: Bishkek
- Venue: 1 (in 1 host city)
- Dates: 27 April – 3 May 2026
- Teams: 6

Final positions
- Champions: Uzbekistan (3rd title)
- Runners-up: Kyrgyzstan
- Third place: Mongolia
- Fourth place: Indonesia

Tournament statistics
- Games played: 15
- Goals scored: 167 (11.13 per game)
- Attendance: 11,100 (740 per game)
- Scoring leader: (Uzbekistan) Mukhammaddiyor Ganiev (18 points)

Official website
- www.iihf.com

The 2026 IIHF U18 Asia Cup was an international men's under-18 ice hockey tournament organized by the International Ice Hockey Federation. The tournament was played from 27 April to 3 May 2026 in Bishkek, Kyrgyzstan. This was the fourth under-18 edition of the event.

Iran were supposed to compete, alongside Macau and Indonesia in Group A, but due to the current situation in the Middle East, Iran were unable to participate, and Uzbekistan took their place.

== Format ==
The teams were divided into two groups of three using the serpentine system. In the group stage, each team from Group A face all three opponents from Group B, and vice versa. The top two teams from each group will advance to the semifinals, which will be played as A1 vs. A2, and B1 vs. B2.

== Group stage ==
All times are local (Kyrgyzstan Time; UTC+6).

=== Group A ===
| Pos | Team | Pld | W | OTW | OTL | L | GF | GA | GD | Pts | Qualification |
|---|---|---|---|---|---|---|---|---|---|---|---|
| 1 | Uzbekistan | 3 | 3 | 0 | 0 | 0 | 26 | 5 | +21 | 9 | Semifinals |
| 2 | Indonesia | 3 | 1 | 0 | 0 | 2 | 12 | 28 | −16 | 3 | Semifinals |
| 3 | Macau | 3 | 0 | 0 | 0 | 3 | 1 | 41 | −40 | 0 | Fifth place series |

Source: IIHF

=== Group B ===
| Pos | Team | Pld | W | OTW | OTL | L | GF | GA | GD | Pts | Qualification |
|---|---|---|---|---|---|---|---|---|---|---|---|
| 1 | Kyrgyzstan (H) | 3 | 2 | 0 | 0 | 1 | 34 | 5 | +29 | 6 | Semifinals |
| 2 | Mongolia | 3 | 2 | 0 | 0 | 1 | 25 | 9 | +16 | 6 | Semifinals |
| 3 | India | 3 | 1 | 0 | 0 | 2 | 15 | 25 | −10 | 3 | Fifth place series |

Source: IIHF
(H) Host

=== Matches ===
| 27 April 2026; 13:00 | Macau | 0–18 (0–6, 0–4, 0–8) | Mongolia | Bishkek Arena, Bishkek; Attendance: 500 |

Game reference
| 0 min | Penalties | 2 min |
| 2 | Shots | 61 |

| 27 April 2026; 16:30 | Indonesia | 9–6 (5–2, 4–1, 0–3) | India | Bishkek Arena, Bishkek; Attendance: 1,000 |

Game reference
| 16 min | Penalties | 38 min |
| 31 | Shots | 20 |

| 27 April 2026; 20:00 | Kyrgyzstan | 2–4 (0–0, 0–2, 2–2) | Uzbekistan | Bishkek Arena, Bishkek; Attendance: 2,200 |

Game reference
| 16 min | Penalties | 14 min |
| 19 | Shots | 25 |

| 28 April 2026; 13:00 | Mongolia | 5–2 (1–1, 3–1, 1–0) | Indonesia | Bishkek Arena, Bishkek; Attendance: 100 |

Game reference
| 10 min | Penalties | 12 min |
| 31 | Shots | 15 |

| 28 April 2026; 16:30 | Uzbekistan | 15–1 (4–1, 5–0, 6–0) | India | Bishkek Arena, Bishkek; Attendance: 500 |

Game reference
| 4 min | Penalties | 6 min |
| 57 | Shots | 9 |

| 28 April 2026; 20:00 | Macau | 0–15 (0–9, 0–3, 0–3) | Kyrgyzstan | Bishkek Arena, Bishkek; Attendance: 1,000 |

Game reference
| 4 min | Penalties | 6 min |
| 3 | Shots | 33 |

| 30 April 2026; 13:00 | Uzbekistan | 7–2 (3–0, 0–0, 4–2) | Mongolia | Bishkek Arena, Bishkek; Attendance: 100 |

Game reference
| 8 min | Penalties | 8 min |
| 33 | Shots | 19 |

| 30 April 2026; 16:30 | India | 8–1 (1–1, 1–0, 6–0) | Macau | Bishkek Arena, Bishkek; Attendance: 600 |

Game reference
| 16 min | Penalties | 10 min |
| 48 | Shots | 23 |

| 30 April 2026; 20:00 | Indonesia | 1–17 (0–6, 0–7, 1–4) | Kyrgyzstan | Bishkek Arena, Bishkek; Attendance: 1,500 |

Game reference
| 2 min | Penalties | 8 min |
| 10 | Shots | 38 |

=== Fifth place series ===
| 2 May 2026; 13:00 | Macau | 1–9 (0–4, 0–2, 1–3) | India | Bishkek Arena, Bishkek; Attendance: 200 |

Game reference
| 14 min | Penalties | 6 min |
| 10 | Shots | 40 |

| 3 May 2026; 13:00 | India | 5–3 (2–1, 2–1, 1–1) | Macau | Bishkek Arena, Bishkek; Attendance: 300 |

Game reference
| 8 min | Penalties | 6 min |
| 46 | Shots | 17 |

== Final round ==
=== Bracket ===
Semifinals
2 May
Uzbekistan | 13
Indonesia | 0
2 May
Kyrgyzstan | 9
Mongolia | 0

Final
3 May
Uzbekistan | 3
Kyrgyzstan | 2
Third place game
3 May
Mongolia | 7
Indonesia | 2

=== Semifinals ===
| 2 May 2026; 16:30 | Uzbekistan | 13–0 (3–0, 7–0, 3–0) | Indonesia | Bishkek Arena, Bishkek; Attendance: 300 |

Game reference
| 2 min | Penalties | 10 min |
| 57 | Shots | 2 |

| 2 May 2026; 20:00 | Kyrgyzstan | 9–0 (3–0, 3–0, 3–0) | Mongolia | Bishkek Arena, Bishkek; Attendance: 1,000 |

Game reference
| 49 min | Penalties | 28 min |
| 56 | Shots | 17 |

=== Third place game ===
| 3 May 2026; 16:30 | Mongolia | 7–2 (4–1, 1–0, 2–1) | Indonesia | Bishkek Arena, Bishkek; Attendance: 300 |

Game reference
| 8 min | Penalties | 10 min |
| 17 | Shots | 21 |

=== Final ===
| 3 May 2026; 20:00 | Uzbekistan | 3–2 (1–1, 0–0, 2–1) | Kyrgyzstan | Bishkek Arena, Bishkek; Attendance: 1,500 |

Game reference
| 12 min | Penalties | 12 min |
| 23 | Shots | 32 |

== Final standings ==
| Pos | Grp | Team | Pld | W | OTW | OTL | L | GF | GA | GD | Pts |
|---|---|---|---|---|---|---|---|---|---|---|---|
| 1 | A | Uzbekistan | 5 | 5 | 0 | 0 | 0 | 42 | 7 | +35 | 15 |
| 2 | B | Kyrgyzstan (H) | 5 | 3 | 0 | 0 | 2 | 45 | 8 | +37 | 9 |
| 3 | B | Mongolia | 5 | 3 | 0 | 0 | 2 | 32 | 20 | +12 | 9 |
| 4 | A | Indonesia | 5 | 1 | 0 | 0 | 4 | 14 | 48 | −34 | 3 |
| 5 | B | India | 5 | 3 | 0 | 0 | 2 | 29 | 29 | 0 | 9 |
| 6 | A | Macau | 5 | 0 | 0 | 0 | 5 | 5 | 55 | −50 | 0 |

Source: IIHF
(H) Host
