= Thailand men's national under-18 ice hockey team =

- Association: Ice Hockey Association of Thailand
- General manager: (Thailand) Rattapol Sriprajittichai
- Head coach: (Thailand) Ken Edvin Kindborn
- Assistants: (Thailand) Charles Nicholas Lampson
- Captain: Thananutch Kulthanthorn
- Team colors
- IIHF code: THA

First international
- South Korea 92 – 0 Thailand (Harbin, China; March 1998)

Biggest win
- Thailand 57 – 0 Kuwait (Tashkent, Uzbekistan; 24 April 2024)

Biggest defeat
- South Korea 92 – 0 Thailand (Harbin, China; March 1998)

IIHF Asian Oceanic U18 Championship
- Appearances: 4 (first in 1998)
- Best result: 6th (1998, 2002)

IIHF U18 Challenge Cup of Asia
- Appearances: 1 (first in 2012)
- Best result: (2012)

International record (W–L–T)
- 4–14–1

The Thailand men's national under-18 ice hockey team is the men's national under-18 ice hockey team of Thailand. The team is controlled by the Ice Hockey Association of Thailand, a member of the International Ice Hockey Federation.

== History ==
The Thailand men's national under-18 ice hockey team played its first game in 1998 during the 1998 IIHF Asian Oceanic Junior U18 Championship being held in Harbin, China. Thailand finished last in the tournament and also suffered their worst defeat in international participation when they lost to South Korea 0 – 92. Thailand did not participate at the Asian Oceanic Junior U18 Championship the following year but returned in 2000 to compete in the Division II group of the 2000 IIHF Asian Oceanic Junior U18 Championship. During the tournament Thailand achieved what was then their best result in international participation when they drew their game against Mongolia 4 – 4. They however lost their other two games against New Zealand and Chinese Taipei and finished in third place. The following year the Division II tournament of the IIHF Asian Oceanic U18 Championship was reduced to three teams after New Zealand had gained promotion to Division I. Thailand competed in two games against Chinese Taipei and Mongolia and lost both games, finishing last. In 2002 the Division I and Division II tournaments of the IIHF Asian Oceanic U18 Championship were merged into a single competition. The 2002 IIHF Asian Oceanic U18 Championship was held in Auckland, New Zealand and was the final edition of the Asian Oceanic U18 Championship. Thailand finished last after they lost all five of their games managing to score only seven goals while conceding 105.

In 2012 Thailand returned to international competition to compete in the 2012 IIHF U18 Challenge Cup of Asia. Thailand won the tournament after winning all four of their games and finishing first in the standings. During the tournament Thailand won their first game in their playing history after they defeated Malaysia 19–1. Their following game was against India which Thailand won 23–1, being recorded as the team's largest victory in international competition.

== International Competitions ==
1. 1998 IIHF Asian Oceanic Junior U18 Championship. Finish: 6th
2. 2000 IIHF Asian Oceanic Junior U18 Championship. Finish: 3rd in Division II (7th overall)
3. 2001 IIHF Asian Oceanic U18 Championship. Finish: 3rd in Division II (7th overall)
4. 2002 IIHF Asian Oceanic U18 Championship. Finish: 6th
5. 2012 IIHF U18 Challenge Cup of Asia. Finish: 1st
6. 2023 IIHF World U18 Championship Division III
7. 2023 IIHF Ice Hockey U18 Asia and Oceania Championship
8. 2024 IIHF World U18 Championship Division III, group B
9. 2024 IIHF U18 Asia and Oceania Championship

== Results ==
#	Year	M	W	D	L	GF	GA	GD
1	1998 IIHF Asian Oceanic Junior U18 Championship	5	0	0	5	3	217	-214
2	2000 IIHF Asian Oceanic Junior U18 Championship	3	0	1	2	7	14	-7
3	2001 IIHF Asian Oceanic U18 Championship	2	0	0	2	2	15	-13
4	2002 IIHF Asian Oceanic U18 Championship	5	0	0	5	7	105	-98
5	2012 IIHF U18 Challenge Cup of Asia	4	4	0	0	52	4	+48
6	2023 IIHF World U18 Championship Division III	3	2	0	1	14	9	+5
7	2023 IIHF Ice Hockey U18 Asia and Oceania Championship	5	1	0	4	19	26	-7
8	2024 IIHF World U18 Championship Division III	3	2	0	1	17	10	+7
9	2024 IIHF U18 Asia and Oceania Championship	TBA						
Total	8 Games	30	9	1	20	121	401	-280

== See also ==
- Blowout (sports)
