= 2001 IIHF Asian Oceanic U18 Championship =

2001 IIHF Asian Oceanic Junior U18 Championship
Tournament details
- Host country: South Korea
- Dates: 8 – 11 March 2001
- Teams: 7

Final positions
- Champions: South Korea (2nd title)
- Runner-up: China
- Third place: Australia

Tournament statistics
- Games played: 9
- Goals scored: 110 (12.22 per game)
- Attendance: 3,900 (433 per game)

The 2001 IIHF Asian Oceanic U18 Championship was the 18th edition of the IIHF Asian Oceanic U18 Championship. The Division I and Division II tournaments took place between 8 and 11 March 2001 in Seoul, South Korea. The Division I tournament was won by South Korea, who claimed their second title by winning all three of their games and finishing first in the standings. Upon winning the tournament South Korea gained promotion to Division III of the 2002 IIHF World U18 Championships. China and Australia finished second and third respectively.

In the Division II tournament, which was also known as the 2002 Division I Qualification tournament, Mongolia finished first in the standings after winning both of their games against Chinese Taipei and Thailand.

== Overview ==
The Division I tournament began on 8 March 2001 in Seoul, South Korea. New Zealand had gained promotion to Division I after finishing first in the Division II tournament at the 2000 IIHF Asian Oceanic Junior U18 Championship. South Korea won the tournament after winning all three of their games and claimed their second title, their first coming in 1998. Following their win South Korea gained promotion for the following year to Division III of the 2002 IIHF World U18 Championships. China finished second after losing their game to South Korea and Australia finished third on losing on goal difference to China after both teams finished on the same number of points. New Zealand who finished last were set to be relegated to Division II for the 2002 IIHF Asian Oceanic U18 Championship however due to a format change both divisions were merged into one tournament for the 2002 competition. Park Chul Ho of South Korea finished as the top scorer for the tournament with ten points including six goals and four assists.

The Division II tournament began on 9 March 2001 in Seoul, South Korea and was officially known as the 2002 IIHF Asian Oceanic U18 Championship Division I Qualification. Mongolia won the tournament after winning both of their games against Chinese Taipei and Thailand. Chinese Taipei finished in second after winning their game against Thailand. Thailand who finished last also suffered the largest defeat of the tournament, losing to Mongolia 1 – 12. Mongolia gained promotion to Division I for the 2002 tournament however due to a format change all teams from Division II were merged into a single competition with the Division I teams for the 2002 IIHF Asian Oceanic U18 Championship. Bold Munktulga of Mongolia finished as the top scorer for the tournament with seven points including five goals and two assists.

== Division I ==
=== Standings ===
Pos	Team	Pld	W	D	L	GF	GA	GD	Pts
1	South Korea	3	3	0	0	39	4	+35	6
2	China	3	1	1	1	26	8	+18	3
3	Australia	3	1	1	1	11	16	−5	3
4	New Zealand	3	0	0	3	4	52	−48	0

Source: IIHF

=== Fixtures ===
All times local.

8 March 2001; 14:00	New Zealand	1–22 (0–6, 0–10, 1–6)	South Korea	Seoul; Attendance: 1500

Game reference

8 March 2001; 17:00	China	2–2 (0–1, 1–1, 1–0)	Australia	Seoul; Attendance: 300

Game reference

9 March 2001; 14:00	China	22–0 (10–0, 7–0, 5–0)	New Zealand	Seoul; Attendance: 300

Game reference

9 March 2001; 17:00	South Korea	11–1 (2–0, 4–0, 5–1)	Australia	Seoul; Attendance: 300

Game reference

11 March 2001; 14:00	South Korea	6–2 (2–0, 2–0, 2–2)	China	Seoul; Attendance: 300

Game reference

11 March 2001; 17:00	Australia	8–3 (4–2, 2–0, 2–1)	New Zealand	Seoul; Attendance: 300

Game reference

=== Scoring leaders ===
List shows the top ten skaters sorted by points, then goals.

Player	GP	G	A	Pts	+/−	PIM	POS
(South Korea) Park Chul Ho	3	6	4	10	+13	2	F
(South Korea) Lee Kwon Jae	3	5	5	10	+13	4	F
(China) Cui Zhinan	3	5	3	8	+6	0	F
(South Korea) Lee Seong Keun	3	4	4	8	+14	0	F
(South Korea) Park Jin Hee	3	3	5	8	+13	0	F
(China) Ding Kun	3	5	1	6	+5	2	F
(China) Liu Liang	3	4	2	6	+5	4	F
(South Korea) Kim Dong Hwan	3	3	3	6	+13	2	D
(South Korea) Choi Jung Sik	3	3	3	6	+13	2	F
(Australia) Jaden McKeever	3	3	3	6	–4	4	F

=== Leading goaltenders ===
Only the top five goaltenders, based on save percentage, who have played 40% of their team's minutes are included in this list.

Player	MIP	SOG	GA	GAA	SVS%	SO
(South Korea) Lee Ji Sub	100:00	20	0	0.00	100.00	0
(China) An Dapeng	80:00	25	2	1.50	92.00	0
(Australia) Matthew Ezzy	120:00	135	13	6.50	90.37	0
(China) Sun Peng	100:00	50	6	3.60	88.00	0
(South Korea) Kim Sung Hoon	80:00	22	4	3.00	81.82	0

== Division II ==
=== Standings ===
Pos	Team	Pld	W	D	L	GF	GA	GD	Pts
1	Mongolia	2	2	0	0	22	4	+18	4
2	Chinese Taipei	2	1	0	1	6	11	−5	2
3	Thailand	2	0	0	2	2	15	−13	0

Source: IIHF

=== Fixtures ===
All times local.

9 March 2001; 11:00	Mongolia	10–3 (1–1, 5–1, 4–1)	Chinese Taipei	Seoul; Attendance: 300

Game reference

10 March 2001; 14:00	Thailand	1–12 (1–4, 0–3, 0–5)	Mongolia	Seoul; Attendance: 300

Game reference

11 March 2001; 11:00	Chinese Taipei	3–1 (0–0, 2–1, 1–0)	Thailand	Seoul; Attendance: 300

Game reference

=== Scoring leaders ===
List shows the top ten skaters sorted by points, then goals.

Player	GP	G	A	Pts	+/−	PIM	POS
(Mongolia) Bold Munkhtulga	2	5	2	7	+10	0	F
(Mongolia) Bat-Erdene Ayushbaatar	2	6	0	6	+8	4	F
(Mongolia) Naidansuren Byambasuren	2	2	2	4	+5	0	F
(Mongolia) Ichinnorov Altangerel	2	2	1	3	+4	0	F
(Chinese Taipei) Ya-Hsien Lai	2	1	2	3	–2	0	F
(Mongolia) Dashnyam Aldarbayar	2	1	2	3	+7	2	F
(Mongolia) Byambaa Bayarjargal	2	1	2	3	+5	4	F
(Chinese Taipei) Ryan Jaw	2	2	0	2	-1	0	F
(Mongolia) Oktyabri Chuluunbat	2	2	0	2	+11	2	D
(Thailand) Abhirat Suraboonkul	2	2	0	2	–6	4	F

=== Leading goaltenders ===
Only the top goaltenders, based on save percentage, who have played 40% of their team's minutes are included in this list.

Player	MIP	SOG	GA	GAA	SVS%	SO
(Mongolia) Odkhuu Batsuuri	120:00	70	4	2.00	94.29	0
(Thailand) Naratip Kanchanachongkol	103:40	78	8	4.63	89.74	0
(Chinese Taipei) Tony Chang	120:00	106	11	5.50	89.62	0
