= 2005 IIHF World U18 Championship Division II =

Tournament details
- Host countries: Estonia; Romania
- Dates: 14 – 20 March 2005; 21 March – 27 April 2005
- Teams: 12

The 2005 IIHF World U18 Championship Division II was a pair of international under-18 ice hockey tournaments run by the International Ice Hockey Federation. The Division II tournaments made up the third level of competition at the 2005 IIHF World U18 Championships. The Group A tournament took place between 14 and 20 March 2005 in Kohtla-Järve, Estonia and the Group B tournament took place between 21 and 27 March 2004 in Bucharest, Romania. South Korea and Hungary won the Group A and Group B tournaments respectively and gained promotion to Division I for the 2006 IIHF World U18 Championships. While South Africa finished last in Group A and Romania last in Group B and were both relegated to Division III for 2006.

== Group A tournament ==
The Group A tournament began on 14 March 2005 in Kohtla-Järve, Estonia. Estonia, the Netherlands, Serbia and Montenegro and Spain returned to compete in the Division II competition after missing promotion at the previous years World Championships. South Korea entered the Division II competition after being relegated from Division I and South Africa entered the tournament after gaining promotion from Division III at the 2004 IIHF World U18 Championships.

South Korea won the tournament after winning all five of their games and gained promotion back to Division I for the 2006 IIHF World U18 Championships. Estonia finished in second place, losing only to South Korea and the Netherlands finished in third. South Africa finished in last place after losing all five of their games and were relegated back to Division III for the 2006 IIHF World U18 Championships. Cho Min Ho of South Korea finished as the top scorer of the tournament with 20 points including 12 goals and eight assists. South Korea's Kim Dong Wook finished as the tournaments leading goaltender with a save percentage of 95.41.

=== Standings ===
Pos	Team	Pld	W	D	L	GF	GA	GD	Pts	Promotion or relegation
1	South Korea	5	5	0	0	51	7	+44	10	Promoted to Division I for 2006
2	Estonia	5	4	0	1	25	17	+8	8	
3	Netherlands	5	3	0	2	30	15	+15	6	
4	Spain	5	2	0	3	16	30	−14	4	
5	Serbia and Montenegro	5	1	0	4	21	20	+1	2	
6	South Africa	5	0	0	5	8	62	−54	0	Relegated to Division III for 2006

=== Fixtures ===
All times local.

14 March 2005; 12:30	South Africa	0 – 22 (0–10, 0–4, 0–8)	South Korea	Kohtla-Järve Spordikeskus Ice Hall; Attendance: 200

Game reference

14 March 2005; 16:00	Spain	3 – 6 (0–1, 2–3, 1–2)	Estonia	Kohtla-Järve Spordikeskus Ice Hall; Attendance: 500

Game reference

14 March 2005; 19:30	Serbia and Montenegro	0 – 8 (0–1, 0–3, 0–4)	Netherlands	Kohtla-Järve Spordikeskus Ice Hall; Attendance: 500

Game reference

15 March 2005; 12:30	South Korea	8 – 1 (2–1, 1–0, 5–0)	Spain	Kohtla-Järve Spordikeskus Ice Hall; Attendance: 200

Game reference

15 March 2005; 16:00	Netherlands	11 – 1 (9–1, 0–0, 2–0)	South Africa	Kohtla-Järve Spordikeskus Ice Hall; Attendance: 200

Game reference

15 March 2005; 19:30	Estonia	3 – 2 (2–0, 0–1, 1–1)	Serbia and Montenegro	Kohtla-Järve Spordikeskus Ice Hall; Attendance: 955

Game reference

17 March 2005; 12:30	Netherlands	2 – 11 (0–4, 2–5, 0–2)	South Korea	Kohtla-Järve Spordikeskus Ice Hall; Attendance: 350

Game reference

17 March 2005; 16:00	Estonia	11 – 3 (3–1, 6–2, 2–0)	South Africa	Kohtla-Järve Spordikeskus Ice Hall; Attendance: 1000

Game reference

Spain	6 – 5 (2–0, 1–3, 3–2)	Serbia and Montenegro	Kohtla-Järve Spordikeskus Ice Hall; Attendance: 300

Game reference

18 March 2005; 12:30	South Africa	4 – 6 (2–3, 1–1, 1–2)	Spain	Kohtla-Järve Spordikeskus Ice Hall; Attendance: 500

Game reference

18 March 2005; 16:00	South Korea	3 – 2 (1–0, 1–1, 1–1)	Serbia and Montenegro	Kohtla-Järve Spordikeskus Ice Hall; Attendance: 500

Game reference

18 March 2005; 19:30	Estonia	3 – 2 (1–0, 1–1, 1–1)	Netherlands	Kohtla-Järve Spordikeskus Ice Hall; Attendance: 2100

Game reference

20 March 2005; 12:30	Serbia and Montenegro	12 – 0 (6–0, 4–0, 2–0)	South Africa	Kohtla-Järve Spordikeskus Ice Hall; Attendance: 200

Game reference

20 March 2005; 16:00	Netherlands	7 – 0 (1–0, 3–0, 3–0)	Spain	Kohtla-Järve Spordikeskus Ice Hall; Attendance: 500

Game reference

20 March 2005; 19:30	South Korea	7 – 2 (1–0, 3–2, 3–0)	Estonia	Kohtla-Järve Spordikeskus Ice Hall

Game reference

=== Scoring leaders ===
List shows the top ten ranked skaters sorted by points, then goals.

Player	GP	G	A	Pts	+/-	PIM	POS
(South Korea) Cho Min Ho	5	12	8	20	+16	4	F
(Estonia) Aleksei Sibirtsev	5	7	6	13	+7	2	F
(Estonia) Illja Illijn	5	4	9	13	+7	2	F
(Netherlands) Tony Demelinne	4	3	8	11	+12	39	F
(South Korea) Kim Chan Hee	5	3	7	10	+10	2	F
(Netherlands) Steven Mason	5	7	2	9	+7	10	F
(Netherlands) Ivy van den Heuvel	5	5	4	9	+8	8	F
(South Korea) Kim Hyung Joon	5	4	5	9	+11	4	F
(South Korea) Lee Don-ku	5	4	5	9	+17	8	D
(Spain) Pablo Munoz	5	7	1	8	–2	8	F

=== Leading goaltenders ===
Only the top five goaltenders, based on save percentage, who have played 40% of their team's minutes are included in this list.

Player	MIP	SOG	GA	GAA	SVS%	SO
(South Korea) Kim Dong Wook	236:45	109	5	1.27	95'41	2
(Serbia and Montenegro) Erich Alaker	290:52	203	20	4.13	90.15	1
(Estonia) Kristjan Eerme	246:29	125	14	3.41	88.80	1
(Spain) Aaron Carretero	280:00	216	27	5.79	93.33	0
(Netherlands) Sjoerd Idzenga	239:40	113	15	3.76	86.73	1

== Group B tournament ==
The Group B tournament began on 21 March 2005 in Bucharest, Romania. Croatia, Hungary, Iceland and Lithuania all returned to compete in the Division II tournament after missing promotion to Division I at the previous years World Championship. Romania entered the Division II competition after being relegated from Division I and Mexico entered the tournament after gaining promotion from Division III at the 2004 IIHF World U18 Championships.

Hungary won the tournament after winning all five of their games and gained promotion to Division I for the 2006 IIHF World U18 Championships. Lithuania finished second after losing only to Hungary and Croatia finished in third place. Romania finished in last place after losing four of their five games and finishing last in the group standings and were relegated to Division III for the 2006 IIHF World U18 Championships. Donatas Kumeliauskas of Lithuania finished as the top scorer of the tournament with 16 points including eight goals and eight assists. Hungary's Tamas Gyomber finished as the tournaments leading goaltender with a save percentage of 91.11.

=== Standings ===
Pos	Team	Pld	W	D	L	GF	GA	GD	Pts	Promotion or relegation
1	Hungary	5	5	0	0	40	8	+32	10	Promoted to Division I for 2006
2	Lithuania	5	4	0	1	31	19	+12	8	
3	Croatia	5	2	1	2	17	18	−1	5	
4	Mexico	5	2	0	3	15	26	−11	4	
5	Iceland	5	1	0	4	19	29	−10	2	
6	Romania	5	0	1	4	8	30	−22	1	Relegated to Division III for 2006

=== Fixtures ===
All times local.

21 March 2005; 13:30	Iceland	2 – 6 (1–0, 0–3, 1–3)	Croatia	M. Flamaropol; Attendance: 100

Game reference

21 March 2005; 17:00	Lithuania	3 – 8 (1–3, 1–5, 1–0)	Hungary	M. Flamaropol; Attendance: 100

Game reference

21 March 2005; 20:30	Mexico	3 – 0 (2–0, 0–0, 1–0)	Romania	M. Flamaropol; Attendance: 300

Game reference

22 March 2005; 13:30	Hungary	7 – 2 (2–1, 5–0, 0–1)	Iceland	M. Flamaropol; Attendance: 100

Game reference

22 March 2005; 17:00	Croatia	5 – 1 (2–1, 1–0, 2–0)	Mexico	M. Flamaropol; Attendance: 100

Game reference

22 March 2005; 20:30	Romania	3 – 8 (0–4, 1–3, 2–1)	Lithuania	M. Flamaropol; Attendance: 250

Game reference

24 March 2003; 13:30	Mexico	3 – 5 (0–2, 3–1, 0–2)	Lithuania	M. Flamaropol; Attendance: 100

Game reference

24 March 2005; 17:00	Hungary	5 – 1 (1–0, 1–0, 3–1)	Croatia	M. Flamaropol; Attendance: 100

Game reference

24 March 2005; 20:30	Romania	1 – 10 (1–6, 0–2, 0–2)	Iceland	M. Flamaropol; Attendance: 250

Game reference

25 March 2005; 13:30	Hungary	13 – 0 (6–0, 3–0, 4–0)	Mexico	M. Flamaropol; Attendance: 100

Game reference

25 March 2005; 17:00	Lithuania	7 – 2 (0–1, 2–0, 5–1)	Iceland	M. Flamaropol; Attendance: 100

Game reference

25 March 2005; 20:30	Croatia	2 – 2 (0–0, 2–1, 0–1)	Romania	M. Flamaropol; Attendance: 150

Game reference

27 March 2005; 13:30	Croatia	3 – 8 (1–2, 1–3, 1–3)	Lithuania	M. Flamaropol; Attendance: 100

Game reference

27 March 2005; 17:00	Iceland	3 – 8 (2–2, 1–3, 0–3)	Mexico	M. Flamaropol; Attendance: 100

Game reference

27 March 2005; 20:30	Romania	2 – 7 (0–3, 0–4, 2–0)	Hungary	M. Flamaropol; Attendance: 250

Game reference

=== Scoring leaders ===
List shows the top ten ranked skaters sorted by points, then goals.

Player	GP	G	A	Pts	+/-	PIM	POS
(Lithuania) Donatas Kumeliauskas	5	8	8	16	+9	2	F
(Iceland) Gauti Thormodsson	5	8	4	12	+4	8	F
(Lithuania) Deividas Kazlauskas	5	6	6	12	+5	10	F
(Hungary) Ákos Kiss	5	5	5	10	+7	26	F
(Lithuania) Sergej Ivanuskin	5	4	6	10	+3	6	F
(Lithuania) Povilas Verenis	5	6	3	9	+1	0	F
(Croatia) Janko Kucera	5	4	5	9	+5	6	F
(Iceland) Emil Alengard	5	2	7	9	+2	38	F
(Hungary) Robert Mekler	3	5	3	8	+7	0	F
(Hungary) Akos Berta	5	3	5	8	+6	12	F

=== Leading goaltenders ===
Only the top five goaltenders, based on save percentage, who have played at least 40% of their team's minutes are included in this list.

Player	MIP	SOG	GA	GAA	SVS%	SO
(Hungary) Tamas Gyomber	150:21	45	4	1.60	91.11	1
(Hungary) Akos Agardy	149:39	35	4	1.60	88.57	1
(Croatia) Tihomir Filipec	300:00	119	18	3.60	84.87	0
(Lithuania) Arturas Kuzmicius	289:33	112	18	3.73	83.93	0
(Iceland) Omar Smari Skulason	250:14	138	23	5.51	83.33	0
