= 2008 IIHF World U18 Championship Division III =

2008 hockey tournament

Tournament details
- Host countries: Mexico; Turkey
- Venue(s): 2 (in 2 host cities)
- Dates: 2–8 March 2008; 3–9 March 2008
- Teams: 10

The 2008 IIHF World U18 Championship Division III was a pair of international under-18 ice hockey tournaments run by the International Ice Hockey Federation. The Division III tournaments made up the fourth level of competition at the 2008 IIHF World U18 Championships. The Group A tournament took place between 2 and 8 March 2008 in Mexico City, Mexico and the Group B tournament took place between 3 and 9 March 2008 in İzmit, Turkey. Mexico and Serbia won the Group A and Group B tournaments respectively and gained promotion to Division II for the 2009 IIHF World U18 Championships.

== Group A tournament ==
The Group A tournament began on 2 March 2008 in Mexico City, Mexico at the San Jeronimo Arena. New Zealand and South Africa both returned to compete in the Division III competition after missing promotion at the previous years World Championships. Mexico entered the Division II competition after being relegated from the 2007 Division II Group A tournament. Chinese Taipei and Mongolia returned to international competition, having last played in the 2002 IIHF Asian Oceanic U18 Championship.

Mexico finished first after winning all four of their games and gamed promotion back to Division II for the 2009 IIHF World U18 Championships. Chinese Taipei finished second after losing only to Mexico and New Zealand finished in third place. Christopher Eaden of New Zealand led the tournament in scoring with 18 points and was named the top forward by the IIHF directorate. Mexico's Manuel Escandon was named the top defenceman and Lin Tsung-Han of Chinese Taipei was selected as the top goaltender. Mexico's Agustin Grimaldi was the leading goaltender with a save percentage of 0.938.

During the first day of the tournament the game between Mexico and South Africa was suspended and the tournament postponed due to a faulty ventilation system which was causing the people within the arena to fall ill. At the time the game was suspended Mexico was winning 11–0, however the IIHF declared the game forfeit in favour of Mexico. The tournament was resumed three days later with equipment being provided to monitor blood oxygen levels and the heart rate of players.

=== Standings ===
Pos	Team	Pld	W	OTW	OTL	L	GF	GA	GD	Pts	Promotion
1	Mexico	4	4	0	0	0	32	2	+30	12	Promoted to the 2009 Division II
2	Chinese Taipei	4	3	0	0	1	31	23	+8	9	
3	New Zealand	4	2	0	0	2	45	18	+27	6	
4	South Africa	4	1	0	0	3	18	26	−8	3	
5	Mongolia	4	0	0	0	4	7	64	−57	0	

Source: IIHF

=== Fixtures ===
All times local.

2 March 2008; 16:00	New Zealand	29–0 (7–0, 10–0, 12–0)	Mongolia	San Jeronimo Arena; Attendance: 550

Game reference

2 March 2008; 16:00	South Africa	0 – 5 (forfeit)^{[I]}	Mexico	San Jeronimo Arena; Attendance: 800

Game reference

5 March 2008; 16:00	New Zealand	10–3 (5–0, 2–2, 3–1)	South Africa	San Jeronimo Arena; Attendance: 100

Game reference

5 March 2008; 19:00	Mexico	10–1 (3–0, 2–0, 5–1)	Chinese Taipei	San Jeronimo Arena; Attendance: 360

Game reference

6 March 2008; 16:00	South Africa	3–9 (0–3, 2–5, 1–1)	Chinese Taipei	San Jeronimo Arena; Attendance: 80

Game reference

6 March 2008; 19:00	Mexico	10–1 (5–0, 0–1, 5–0)	Mongolia	San Jeronimo Arena; Attendance: 326

Game reference

7 March 2008; 16:00	Mongolia	2–12 (1–5, 0–4, 1–3)	South Africa	San Jeronimo Arena; Attendance: 145

Game reference

7 March 2008; 19:00	Chinese Taipei	8–6 (2–4, 3–1, 3–1)	New Zealand	San Jeronimo Arena; Attendance: 157

Game reference

8 March 2008; 16:00	Chinese Taipei	13–4 (5–0, 5–0, 3–4)	Mongolia	San Jeronimo Arena; Attendance: 375

Game reference

8 March 2008; 19:00	Mexico	7–0 (2–0, 4–0, 1–0)	New Zealand	San Jeronimo Arena; Attendance: 1386

Game reference

=== Scoring leaders ===
List shows the top ten ranked skaters sorted by points, then goals.

Player	GP	G	A	Pts	+/-	PIM	POS
(New Zealand) Christopher Eaden	4	9	9	18	+8	12	F
(New Zealand) Daniel Nicholls	4	6	8	14	+11	6	D
(Chinese Taipei) Lin Hung-Ju	4	7	5	12	+7	4	F
(Chinese Taipei) Shen Yenchin	4	5	6	11	+6	6	F
(Mexico) Pablo Ehlers	3	4	7	11	+10	4	F
(South Africa) Deen Magmoed	3	8	2	10	+9	6	F
(South Africa) Cameron Birrell	3	7	3	10	+10	24	F
(Mexico) Alan Smithers	3	6	4	10	+10	12	F
(New Zealand) Jordan Challis	4	5	5	10	+4	6	F
(Mexico) Carlos Gomez	3	4	5	9	+9	4	F

=== Leading goaltenders ===
Only the top five goaltenders, based on save percentage, who have played at least 40% of their team's minutes are included in this list.

Player	MIP	SOG	GA	GAA	SVS%	SO
(Mexico) Agustin Grimaldi	117:53	32	2	1.02	93.75	0
(South Africa) Zayne Campbell Hall	83:08	70	8	5.77	88.75	0
(New Zealand) Andre Dowman	116:35	51	7	3.60	86.27	0
(Chinese Taipei) Lin Tsung-Han	122:23	79	11	5.39	86.08	0
(New Zealand) Michael Hopkinson	122:43	60	11	5.38	81.67	0

== Group B tournament ==
The Group B tournament began on 3 March 2008 in İzmit, Turkey at the K.B.B. Ice Arena. Iceland and Turkey returned to compete in the Division III tournament after missing promotion to Division II at the previous years World Championships. Serbia entered the Division II competition after being relegated from the 2007 Division II Group B tournament. Bulgaria returned to Division III after playing in the qualification tournament last year and Armenia returned to international competition, having last played in the 2005 IIHF World U18 Championship Division III Qualification tournament.

Serbia finished first after winning all four of their games and gained promotion back to Division II for the 2009 IIHF World U18 Championships. Iceland finished second, losing only to Serbia and Turkey finished in third place. Arsenije Rankovic of Serbia led the tournament in goaltending with a save percentage of 1.000 and was named the top goaltender by the IIHF directorate. Serbia's Stefan Ilic was named the top defenceman and Egill Thormodsson of Iceland was selected as the top forward. Thormodsson also led the tournament in scoring, finishing with 18 points including 16 goals and two assists.

=== Standings ===
Pos	Team	Pld	W	OTW	OTL	L	GF	GA	GD	Pts	Promotion
1	Serbia	4	4	0	0	0	45	0	+45	12	Promoted to the 2009 Division II
2	Iceland	4	3	0	0	1	48	7	+41	9	
3	Turkey	4	2	0	0	2	34	26	+8	6	
4	Bulgaria	4	1	0	0	3	27	35	−8	3	
5	Armenia	4	0	0	0	4	1	87	−86	0	

Source: IIHF

=== Fixtures ===
All times local.

3 March 2008; 15:30	Bulgaria	24–1 (7–0, 6–0, 11–1)	Armenia	K.B.B. Ice Arena; Attendance: 50

Game reference

3 March 2008; 19:00	Serbia	12–0 (5–0, 3–0, 4–0)	Turkey	K.B.B. Ice Arena; Attendance: 400

Game reference

4 March 2008; 15:30	Bulgaria	0–13 (0–4, 0–3, 0–6)	Serbia	K.B.B. Ice Arena; Attendance: 75

Game reference

4 March 2008; 19:00	Turkey	2–12 (1–6, 1–2, 0–4)	Iceland	K.B.B. Ice Arena; Attendance: 250

Game reference

6 March 2008; 15:30	Serbia	4–0 (1–0, 1–0, 2–0)	Iceland	K.B.B. Ice Arena; Attendance: 100

Game reference

6 March 2008; 19:00	Turkey	24–0 (9–0, 8–0, 7–0)	Armenia	K.B.B. Ice Arena; Attendance: 250

Game reference

7 March 2008; 15:30	Armenia	0–16 (0–8, 0–4, 0–4)	Serbia	K.B.B. Ice Arena; Attendance: 45

Game reference

7 March 2008; 19:00	Iceland	13–1 (2–0, 6–0, 5–1)	Bulgaria	K.B.B. Ice Arena; Attendance: 50

Game reference

9 March 2008; 15:30	Iceland	23–0 (8–0, 7–0, 8–0)	Armenia	K.B.B. Ice Arena; Attendance: 45

Game reference

9 March 2008; 19:00	Turkey	8–2 (2–1, 1–0, 5–1)	Bulgaria	K.B.B. Ice Arena; Attendance: 450

Game reference

=== Scoring leaders ===
List shows the top ten ranked skaters sorted by points, then goals.

Player	GP	G	A	Pts	+/-	PIM	POS
(Iceland) Egill Thormodsson	4	16	2	18	+19	0	F
(Turkey) Batin Kosemen	4	5	7	12	+3	14	F
(Serbia) Vladimir Meseldzic	4	4	6	10	+13	2	F
(Bulgaria) Aleksandar Yanev	4	6	3	9	−2	10	F
(Bulgaria) Tomas Saint James	4	5	4	9	−3	2	F
(Turkey) Volkan Toptaner	4	5	4	9	+3	6	F
(Iceland) Petur Maack	4	3	6	9	+15	8	F
(Iceland) Andri Mikaelsson	4	2	7	9	+11	8	F
(Bulgaria) Viktor Spirov	4	5	3	8	−3	4	F
(Serbia) Dimitrije Filipovic	4	4	4	8	+10	8	F
(Serbia) Nemanja Vucurevic	4	4	4	8	+12	2	F

=== Leading goaltenders ===
Only the top five goaltenders, based on save percentage, who have played at least 40% of their team's minutes are included in this list.

Player	MIP	SOG	GA	GAA	SVS%	SO
(Serbia) Arsenije Rankovic	180:00	44	0	0.00	100.00	3
(Iceland) Aevar Bjornsson	154:59	53	6	2.32	88.68	0
(Bulgaria) Teodor Asenov	125:56	114	20	9.53	82.46	0
(Turkey) Selami Onart	200:00	115	26	7.80	77.39	0
(Bulgaria) Veselin Maymarov	114:04	61	15	7.89	75.41	0

== Notes ==
I The Game was suspended midway through the second period due to the Arena's faulty ventilation system which was causing people to become ill. At the time the game was suspended Mexico was winning 11–0.
