= 1996 IIHF European U18 Championship =

The 1996 IIHF European U18 Championship was the twenty-ninth playing of the IIHF European Junior Championships.

== Group A ==
Played April 7 to the 14th, in Ufa, Russia.

=== First round ===
Because of Germany's success in the previous year, the draw for this year's championship guaranteed a final four berth for either Germany, Switzerland or Belarus. Group 1 was made up of the teams that finished 1st, 4th, 5th, and the newly promoted country, Group 2 contained 2nd, 3rd, 6th, and 7th. Unfortunately, this meant that for Slovakia's first time playing at the top level, they would face Finland, Russia, and the Czech Republic, in the first round. The Swiss made the most of their opportunity, becoming just the seventh nation to finish in the top four.

Group 1

Team	FIN	RUS	CZE	SVK	GF/GA	Points
1. Finland		3:3	2:0	5:3	10:6	5
2. Russia	3:3		4:4	6:2	13:9	4
3. Czech Republic	0:2	4:4		3:1	7:7	3
4. Slovakia	3:5	2:6	1:3		6:14	0

Group 2

Team	SWE	SUI	GER	BLR	GF/GA	Points
1. Sweden		4:2	6:0	11:2	21:4	6
2. Switzerland	2:4		5:4	5:2	12:10	4
3. Germany	0:6	4:5		4:3	8:14	2
4. Belarus	2:11	2:5	3:4		7:20	0

=== Final round ===
On the final day the Russians and the Finns both won to finish tied for first, and since they had tied each other, it came down to goal differential in the final round. Both teams beat the Swedes by three goals, but Russia's seven goal margin against the Swiss clinched the gold.

Championship round

Team	RUS	FIN	SWE	SUI	GF/GA	Points
1. Russia		(3:3)	5:2	8:1	16:6	5
2. Finland	(3:3)		3:0	4:3	10:6	5
3. Sweden	2:5	0:3		(4:2)	6:10	2
4. Switzerland	1:8	3:4	(2:4)		6:16	0

Placing round

On the final day of competition, Slovakia avenged their surprising loss in 1993, by beating, and in effect relegating, Belarus.

Team	CZE	GER	SVK	BLR	GF/GA	Points
1. Czech Republic		8:0	(3:1)	10:1	21:2	6
2. Germany	0:8		6:4	(4:3)	10:15	4
3. Slovakia	(1:3)	4:6		7:4	12:13	2
4. Belarus	1:10	(3:4)	4:7		8:21	0

Belarus was relegated to Group B for 1997.

== Tournament Awards ==
- Top Scorer (Germany) Marco Sturm (11 points)
- Top Goalie: (Czech Republic) Adam Svoboda
- Top Defenceman: (Russia) Andrei Zyuzin
- Top Forward: (Sweden) Marcus Nilson

== Group B ==
Played from March 23 to the 29th, in Tychy and Sosnowiec, Poland. Polish player Leszek Laszkiewicz was the leading scorer in Group B, with nine goals and 13 points he was named to the event's all-star team.

=== First round ===
Group 1

Team	UKR	NOR	ITA	HUN	GF/GA	Points
1. Ukraine		6:2	6:1	5:3	17:6	6
2. Norway	2:6		6:3	6:1	14:10	4
3. Italy	1:6	3:6		3:0	7:12	2
4. Hungary	3:5	1:6	0:3		4:14	0

Group 2

Team	DEN	FRA	POL	ROM	GF/GA	Points
1. Denmark		6:3	7:5	12:4	25:12	6
2. France	3:6		7:3	8:3	18:12	4
3. Poland	5:7	3:7		20:0	28:14	2
4. Romania	4:12	3:8	0:20		7:40	0

=== Final round ===
Championship round

Team	UKR	DEN	FRA	NOR	GF/GA	Points
1. Ukraine		5:4	4:2	(6:2)	15:8	6
2. Denmark	4:5		(6:3)	3:2	13:10	4
3. France	2:4	(3:6)		5:1	10:11	2
4. Norway	(2:6)	2:3	1:5		5:14	0

Placing round

Team	POL	ITA	HUN	ROM	GF/GA	Points
1. Poland		6:0	7:4	(20:0)	33:4	6
2. Italy	0:6		(3:0)	9:4	12:10	4
3. Hungary	4:7	(0:3)		7:0	11:10	2
4. Romania	(0:20)	4:9	0:7		4:36	0

Ukraine was promoted to Group A and Romania was relegated to Group C, for 1997.

== Group C ==
Played from March 15 to 19, in Maribor, Slovenia.

=== First round ===
Group 1

Team	AUT	EST	GBR	CRO	GF/GA	Points
1. Austria		1:1	4:3	9:1	14:5	5
2. Estonia	1:1		3:3	6:4	10:8	4
3. Great Britain	3:4	3:3		10:2	16:9	3
4. Croatia	1:9	4:6	2:10		7:25	0

Group 2

Team	SLO	LAT	LTU	ESP	GF/GA	Points
1. Slovenia		3:0	16:3	13:0	32:3	6
2. Latvia	0:3		12:3	13:0	25:6	4
3. Lithuania	3:16	3:12		11:0	17:28	2
4. Spain	0:13	0:13	0:11		0:37	0

=== Placing round ===
7th place	Croatia	10:2 (5:0, 1:0, 4:2)	Spain
5th place	Great Britain	12:3 (4:1, 4:1, 4:1)	Lithuania
3rd place	Latvia	9:2 (4:0, 1:2, 4:0)	Estonia
Final	Slovenia	4:3 (1:1, 3:1, 0:1)	Austria

Slovenia was promoted to Group B and Spain was relegated to Group D, for 1997.

== Group D ==
Played from March 6 to 10 in Sofia, Bulgaria.

=== First round ===
Group 1

Team	NED	BUL	TUR	GF/GA	Points
1. Netherlands		16:0	40:0	56:0	4
2. Bulgaria	0:16		23:1	23:17	2
3. Turkey	0:40	1:23		1:63	0

Group 2

Team	YUG	ISR	GRE	GF/GA	Points
1. Yugoslavia		6:2	(14:0)	6:2	2
2. Israel	2:6		(5:0)	2:6	0
3. Greece	(0:14)	(0:5)		(0:19)	(0)

- The Greek team did not have the minimum required number of players, and were disqualified. However, they still played their games against Israel and Yugoslavia as exhibition matches. They also played an exhibition game against fifth place Turkey, defeating them seven to five.

=== Placing round ===
3rd place	Israel	4:3 o.t. (0:2, 3:0, 0:1, 1:0)	Bulgaria
Final	Netherlands	6:4 (2:2, 0:2, 4:0)	Yugoslavia

The Netherlands was promoted to Group C for 1997.
