= MIHF =

MIHF may refer to:

- Malaysia Ice Hockey Federation, sports organization of Malaysia
- Mongolian Ice Hockey Federation, sports organization of Mongolia
