= 2003 IIHF World U18 Championship Division II =

International Ice Hockey Championships 2003/4

Tournament details
- Host countries: Estonia; Serbia and Montenegro
- Dates: 5 – 11 March 2003; 17 – 23 March 2003
- Teams: 12

The 2003 IIHF World U18 Championship Division II was a pair of international under-18 ice hockey tournaments run by the International Ice Hockey Federation. The Division II tournaments made up the third level of competition at the 2003 IIHF World U18 Championships. The Group A tournament took place between 17 and 23 March 2003 in Tallinn, Estonia and the Group B tournament took place between 5 and 11 March 2003 in Belgrade, Serbia and Montenegro (renamed from FR Yugoslavia in February 2003). South Korea and Romania won the Group A and Group B tournaments respectively and gained promotion to Division I for the 2004 IIHF World U18 Championships. While Bulgaria finished last in Group A and South Africa last in Group B and were both relegated to Division III for 2004.

== Group A tournament ==
The Group A tournament began on 17 March 2003 in Tallinn, Estonia. Both Croatia and Estonia who missed promotion to Division I at the previous years World Championship returned to compete in this year's Division II tournament. Belgium, Bulgaria, South Korea and Spain all gained promotion to Division II from Division III following a restructure of the Division sizes which increased the number of teams in each group from four to six. South Korea won the tournament after winning all five of their games and gained promotion to Division I for the 2004 IIHF World U18 Championships. Estonia finished second losing only to South Korea and Croatia finished in third place. Bulgaria finished in last place after losing all five of their games and were relegated back to Division III for the 2004 IIHF World U18 Championships. Tomislav Grozaj of Croatia finished as the top scorer of the tournament with 27 points including 18 goals and nine assists. Thomas Tyson of Belgium finished the tournament as the leading goaltender based on save percentage.

=== Standings ===
Pos	Team	Pld	W	D	L	GF	GA	GD	Pts	Promotion or relegation
1	South Korea	5	5	0	0	56	12	+44	10	Promoted to Division I for 2004
2	Estonia	5	4	0	1	49	8	+41	8	
3	Croatia	5	2	1	2	38	20	+18	5	
4	Belgium	5	2	1	2	20	32	−12	5	
5	Spain	5	1	0	4	23	36	−13	2	
6	Bulgaria	5	0	0	5	2	80	−78	0	Relegated to Division III for 2004

Source: IIHF

=== Fixtures ===
All times local.

17 March 2003; 12:30	Belgium	1 – 13 (0–6, 1–3, 0–4)	South Korea	Tallinn; Attendance: 300

Game reference

17 March 2003; 16:00	Spain	4 – 9 (1–5, 1–4, 2–0)	Croatia	Tallinn; Attendance: 300

Game reference

17 March 2003; 19:30	Bulgaria	0 – 17 (0–6, 0–3, 0–8)	Estonia	Tallinn; Attendance: 800

Game reference

18 March 2003; 12:30	Croatia	4 – 4 (1–0, 3–2, 0–2)	Belgium	Tallinn; Attendance: 300

Game reference

18 March 2003; 16:00	South Korea	18 – 0 (5–0, 8–0, 5–0)	Bulgaria	Tallinn; Attendance: 320

Game reference

18 March 2003; 19:30	Estonia	12 – 0 (2–0, 6–0, 4–0)	Spain	Tallinn; Attendance: 793

Game reference

20 March 2003; 12:30	Bulgaria	1 – 15 (1–5, 0–4, 0–6)	Spain	Tallinn; Attendance: 300

Game reference

20 March 2003; 16:00	Croatia	4 – 9 (0–4, 1–1, 3–4)	South Korea	Tallinn; Attendance: 300

Game reference

20 March 2003; 19:30	Estonia	11 – 0 (3–0, 4–0, 4–0)	Belgium	Tallinn; Attendance: 699

Game reference

21 March 2003; 12:30	Croatia	20 – 0 (4–0, 5–0, 11–0)	Bulgaria	Tallinn; Attendance: 300

Game reference

21 March 2003; 16:00	Spain	3 – 5 (2–1, 1–4, 0–0)	Belgium	Tallinn; Attendance: 300

Game reference

21 March 2003; 19:30	South Korea	7 – 6 (2–3, 2–1, 3–2)	Estonia	Tallinn; Attendance: 1402

Game reference

23 March 2003; 12:30	South Korea	9 – 1 (4–1, 4–0, 1–0)	Spain	Tallinn; Attendance: 300

Game reference

23 March 2003; 16:00	Belgium	10 – 1 (1–0, 3–0, 6–1)	Bulgaria	Tallinn; Attendance: 300

Game reference

23 March 2003; 19:30	Estonia	3 – 1 (2–0, 0–1, 1–0)	Croatia	Tallinn; Attendance: 781

Game reference

=== Scoring leaders ===
List shows the top ten skaters sorted by points, then goals.

Player	GP	G	A	Pts	+/-	PIM	POS
(Croatia) Tomislav Grozaj	5	18	9	27	+18	6	F
(South Korea) Kim Ki-Sung	5	9	9	18	+18	0	F
(South Korea) Park Woo-Sang	5	11	6	17	+16	0	F
(South Korea) Kwon Tae-An	5	9	8	17	+17	10	F
(Estonia) Aleksandr Kuznetsov	5	10	6	16	+14	0	F
(Croatia) Miro Smerdelj	5	2	11	13	+17	8	F
(Croatia) David Iveziq	5	6	6	12	+14	0	F
(South Korea) Lee Seung-Jun	5	3	9	12	+16	4	F
(Croatia) Kresimir Radovic	5	1	11	12	+13	12	D
(South Korea) Chang Jun-Il	5	9	2	11	+15	4	F

=== Leading goaltenders ===
Only the top five goaltenders, based on save percentage, who have played 40% of their team's minutes are included in this list.

Player	MIP	SOG	GA	GAA	SVS%	SO
(Belgium) Thomas Tyson	135:05	105	15	6.66	85.71	0
(Estonia) Valentin Itsenko	180:00	46	7	2.33	84.78	2
(Croatia) Sinisa Blagus	185:31	84	13	4.20	84.52	1
(South Korea) Kim Yu-Jin	182:19	50	9	2.96	82.00	0
(Belgium) Kevin van Looveren	164:55	87	17	6.18	80.46	0

== Group B tournament ==
The Group B tournament began on 5 March 2003 in Belgrade, Serbia and Montenegro. Hungary, Netherlands and Romania all returned to compete in the Division II tournament after missing promotion to Division I at the previous years World Championship. Lithuania, South Africa and Federal Republic of Yugoslavia all gained promotion to Division II from Division III following a restructure of the Division sizes which increased the number of teams in each group from four to six. Romania won the tournament after winning all five of their games and gained promotion to Division I for the 2004 IIHF World U18 Championships. Hungary finished second after winning three games and drawing a fourth and the Netherlands finished in third place. South Africa finished in last place after losing all five of their games and were relegated back to Division III for the 2004 IIHF World U18 Championships. The tournament was also the last appearance of the Federal Republic Yugoslavia's under-18 team as the country was reconstituted as the State Union of Serbia and Montenegro. The Yugoslavia men's under-18 team was replaced the following year by the Serbia and Montenegro men's national under-18 ice hockey team. Tivadar Petres of Romania finished as the top scorer of the tournament with 17 points including 11 goals and six assists. Hungary's Dominik Vinnai finished the tournament as the leading goaltender based on save percentage.

=== Standings ===
Pos	Team	Pld	W	D	L	GF	GA	GD	Pts	Promotion or relegation
1	Romania	5	5	0	0	33	10	+23	10	Promoted to Division I for 2004
2	Hungary	5	3	1	1	27	12	+15	7	
3	Netherlands	5	3	0	2	22	17	+5	6	
4	Yugoslavia	5	2	1	2	14	19	−5	5	
5	Lithuania	5	1	0	4	15	29	−14	2	
6	South Africa	5	0	0	5	9	33	−24	0	Relegated to Division III for 2004

Source: IIHF

=== Fixtures ===
All times local.

5 March 2003; 13:00	South Africa	1 – 7 (0–3, 0–1, 1–3)	Romania	Belgrade; Attendance: 300

Game reference

5 March 2003; 16:15	Lithuania	0 – 5 (0–2, 0–3, 0–0)	Netherlands	Belgrade; Attendance: 300

Game reference

5 March 2003; 19:30	Yugoslavia	2 – 2 (2–2, 0–0, 0–0)	Hungary	Belgrade; Attendance: 1500

Game reference

6 March 2003; 13:00	Hungary	8 – 0 (1–0, 3–0, 4–0)	South Africa	Belgrade; Attendance: 300

Game reference

6 March 2003; 16:15	Romania	5 – 2 (1–0, 3–2, 1–0)	Lithuania	Belgrade; Attendance: 300

Game reference

6 March 2003; 19:30	Netherlands	5 – 2 (2–0, 2–2, 1–0)	Yugoslavia	Belgrade; Attendance: 1000

Game reference

8 March 2003; 13:00	Hungary	1 – 6 (1–1, 0–4, 0–1)	Romania	Belgrade; Attendance: 300

Game reference

8 March 2003; 16:15	Netherlands	8 – 3 (2–1, 2–0, 4–2)	South Africa	Belgrade; Attendance: 300

Game reference

8 March 2003; 19:30	Lithuania	3 – 4 (0–2, 2–0, 1–2)	Yugoslavia	Belgrade; Attendance: 1200

Game reference

9 March 2003; 13:00	Romania	7 – 4 (3–2, 2–1, 2–1)	Netherlands	Belgrade; Attendance: 300

Game reference

9 March 2003; 16:15	Hungary	11 – 4 (3–1, 2–2, 6–1)	Lithuania	Belgrade; Attendance: 300

Game reference

9 March 2003; 19:30	Yugoslavia	4 – 1 (0–1, 1–0, 3–0)	South Africa	Belgrade; Attendance: 1000

Game reference

11 March 2003; 13:00	South Africa	4 – 6 (1–4, 2–1, 1–1)	Lithuania	Belgrade; Attendance: 300

Game reference

11 March 2003; 16:15	Netherlands	0 – 5 (0–1, 0–1, 0–3)	Hungary	Belgrade; Attendance: 300

Game reference

11 March 2003; 19:30	Romania	8 – 2 (2–1, 4–1, 2–0)	Yugoslavia	Belgrade; Attendance: 1600

Game reference

=== Scoring leaders ===
List shows the top ten skaters sorted by points, then goals.

Player	GP	G	A	Pts	+/-	PIM	POS
(Romania) Tivadar Petres	5	11	6	17	+14	4	F
(Romania) Ede Mihaly	5	8	7	15	+11	0	F
(Netherlands) Hubertus Verdonschot	5	5	6	11	+1	6	F
(Romania) Mihail Georgescu	5	7	3	10	+3	18	F
(Hungary) Istvan Marko	5	4	4	8	+5	2	F
(Hungary) Patrik Szajbert	5	4	4	8	+7	6	F
(Netherlands) Mark Donders	5	4	4	8	0	6	F
(Lithuania) Marius Lelenas	5	4	2	6	-3	12	F
(Hungary) Viktor Papp	5	3	3	6	+5	8	F
(Netherlands) Bart van Roosmalen	5	3	3	6	+5	24	F

=== Leading goaltenders ===
Only the top five goaltenders, based on save percentage, who have played 40% of their team's minutes are included in this list.

Player	MIP	SOG	GA	GAA	SVS%	SO
(Hungary) Dominik Vinnai	209:16	81	5	1.43	93.83	2
(Romania) Bogdan Popa	240:00	101	8	2.00	92.08	0
(Federal Republic of Yugoslavia) Milan Lukovic	194:30	105	10	3.08	90.48	0
(Netherlands) Victor Boutrs Girgis	240:00	124	14	3.50	88.71	1
(Lithuania) Lukas Jaksys	269:18	196	24	5.35	87.76	0
