= 2023 IIHF U18 Asia and Oceania Championship =

International ice hockey competition in Ulaanbaatar, Mongolia

Tournament details
- Host country: Mongolia
- City: Ulaanbaatar
- Venue(s): 1 (in 1 host city)
- Dates: 11–17 March 2023
- Teams: 6

Final positions
- Champions: Uzbekistan (1st title)
- Runner-up: Turkmenistan
- Third place: Mongolia

Tournament statistics
- Scoring leader(s): (Uzbekistan) Jasurbek Rustamkhonov (26 points)

Official website
- www.iihf.com

The 2023 IIHF U18 Asia and Oceania Championship was an international men's under-18 ice hockey tournament run by the International Ice Hockey Federation (IIHF). The tournament took place between 11 and 17 March 2023 in Ulaanbaatar, Mongolia and was the first under-18 edition of the event held since 2012. Uzbekistan placed first after winning all five of their games, while Turkmenistan finished second and Mongolia third. This was the first time that Uzbekistan had participated in any IIHF tournament and the first international ice hockey event ever hosted by Mongolia.

== Standings ==
Pos	Team	Pld	W	OTW	OTL	L	GF	GA	GD	Pts
1	Uzbekistan	5	5	0	0	0	44	8	+36	15
2	Turkmenistan	5	4	0	0	1	31	15	+16	12
3	Mongolia (H)	5	3	0	0	2	29	19	+10	9
4	United Arab Emirates	5	2	0	0	3	18	29	−11	6
5	Thailand	5	1	0	0	4	19	26	−7	3
6	Iran	5	0	0	0	5	4	48	−44	0

(H) Host

== Fixtures ==
All times are local.

11 March 2023; 13:30	United Arab Emirates	6–2	Thailand	Steppe Arena, Ulaanbaatar

Game reference

11 March 2023; 17:00	Uzbekistan	5–0	Turkmenistan	Steppe Arena, Ulaanbaatar

Game reference

11 March 2023; 20:30	Mongolia	5–0	Iran	Steppe Arena, Mongolia

Game reference

12 March 2023; 13:30	Thailand	3–4	Turkmenistan	Steppe Arena, Ulaanbaatar

Game reference

12 March 2023; 17:00	Iran	1–14	Uzbekistan	Steppe Arena, Ulaanbaatar

Game reference

12 March 2023; 20:30	Mongolia	10–2	United Arab Emirates	Steppe Arena, Mongolia

Game reference

14 March 2023; 13:30	Thailand	8–0	Iran	Steppe Arena, Ulaanbaatar

Game reference

14 March 2023; 17:00	United Arab Emirates	2–7	Turkmenistan	Steppe Arena, Ulaanbaatar

Game reference

14 March 2023; 20:30	Mongolia	4–7	Uzbekistan	Steppe Arena, Ulaanbaatar

Game reference

15 March 2023; 13:30	Iran	2–7	United Arab Emirates	Steppe Arena, Ulaanbaatar

Game reference

15 March 2023; 17:00	Uzbekistan	10–2	Thailand	Steppe Arena, Ulaanbaatar

Game reference

15 March 2023; 20:30	Turkmenistan	6–4	Mongolia	Steppe Arena, Ulaanbaatar

Game reference

17 March 2023; 13:30	Turkmenistan	14–1	Iran	Steppe Arena, Ulaanbaatar

Game reference

17 March 2023; 17:00	United Arab Emirates	1–8	Uzbekistan	Steppe Arena, Ulaanbaatar

Game reference

17 March 2023; 20:30	Thailand	4–6	Mongolia	Steppe Arena, Ulaanbaatar

Game reference
