= Chinese Taipei men's national under-18 ice hockey team =

- Chinese Taipei uses their Olympic flag emblem for their jersey badge.
- Association: Chinese Taipei Ice Hockey Federation
- General manager: (Taiwan) Hsiao Wen-Yu
- Head coach: (Taiwan) Weng To
- Assistants: (Taiwan) Chang Pan-Yao (Taiwan) Lee Chi-Hsin (Taiwan) Yu Kai-Wen
- Captain: Hsiao Po-Yun
- Team colors
- IIHF code: TPE

First international
- New Zealand 20 – 3 Chinese Taipei (Pyongyang, North Korea; March 20, 1999)

Biggest win
- Chinese Taipei 17 – 0 Mongolia (Taipei, Republic of China; February 27, 2009); Chinese Taipei 18 – 1 Mongolia (Erzurum, Turkey; March 9, 2010)

Biggest defeat
- South Africa 34 – 1 Chinese Taipei (Pyongyang, North Korea; March 21, 1999)

IIHF World U18 Championship
- Appearances: 13 (first in 2008)
- Best result: 31st (2022)

IIHF Asian Oceanic U18 Championship
- Appearances: 4 (first in 1999)
- Best result: 5th (2002)

International record (W–L–T)
- 23–27–1

The Chinese Taipei men's national under-18 ice hockey team is the men's national under-18 ice hockey team of the Republic of China. The team is controlled by the Chinese Taipei Ice Hockey Federation, a member of the International Ice Hockey Federation.

== History ==
The Chinese Taipei men's national under-18 ice hockey team played its first game in 1999 during the 1999 IIHF Asian Oceanic Junior U18 Championship Division II tournament being held in Pyongyang, North Korea. Chinese Taipei lost the tournament and also suffered their largest defeat in international participation when they lost to South Africa 1–34. Chinese Taipei remained in Division II for the next two year finishing in second place in both years. In 2002 the two divisions were merged for the 2002 IIHF Asian Oceanic U18 Championship. Chinese Taipei finished in fifth place after only managing one win against Thailand. After a six-year absence from international competition the under-18 team returned to compete in the 2008 IIHF World U18 Championships Division III Group A tournament being held in Mexico City, Mexico. They finished in second place losing only one game to Mexico. During the 2010 IIHF World U18 Championships Division III Group A tournament Chinese Taipei achieved their largest victory in international participation when they defeated Mongolia 18–1. Chinese Taipei have continued to compete in the Division III tournament at the World U18 Championships and most recently finished in fifth place at the 2012 IIHF World U18 Championships Division III Group A tournament and third place at the 2013 IIHF World U18 Championship Division III Group A tournament.

== International competitions ==
- 1999 IIHF Asian Oceanic Junior U18 Championship Finish: 4th in Division II (8th overall)
- 2000 IIHF Asian Oceanic Junior U18 Championship Finish: 2nd in Division II (6th overall)
- 2001 IIHF Asian Oceanic U18 Championship Finish: 2nd in Division II (6th overall)
- 2002 IIHF Asian Oceanic U18 Championship Finish: 5th (5th overall)
- 2008 IIHF World U18 Championships Finish: 2nd in Division III Group A (37th overall)
- 2009 IIHF World U18 Championships Finish: 3rd in Division III Group A (39th overall)
- 2010 IIHF World U18 Championships Finish: 3rd in Division III Group A (39th overall)
- 2011 IIHF World U18 Championships Finish: 2nd in Division III Group A (38th overall)
- 2012 IIHF World U18 Championships Finish: 5th in Division III (39th overall)
- 2013 IIHF World U18 Championships Finish: 3rd in Division III (37th overall)
- 2014 IIHF World U18 Championships Finish: 3rd in Division III Group A (37th overall)
- 2015 IIHF World U18 Championships Finish: 4th in Division III Group A (38th overall)
- 2016 IIHF World U18 Championships Finish: 5th in Division III Group A (39th overall)
- 2017 IIHF World U18 Championships Finish: 3rd in Division III Group A (37th overall)
- 2018 IIHF World U18 Championships Finish: 6th in Division III Group A (40th overall)
- 2019 IIHF World U18 Championships Finish: 1st in Division III Group B (41st overall)
- 2020 IIHF World U18 Championships : Cancelled due to COVID-19 pandemic
- 2021 IIHF World U18 Championships : Cancelled due to COVID-19 pandemic
- 2022 IIHF World U18 Championships Finish: 1st in Division III Group A (31st overall)
- 2023 IIHF World U18 Championships Finish: 3rd in Division II Group B (31st overall)
- 2024 IIHF World U18 Championships Finish: 5th in Division II Group B (33rd overall)
- 2025 IIHF World U18 Championships Finish: 3rd in Division II Group B (31st overall)

== Team roster ==
From the 2012 IIHF World U18 Championships Division III Group A

#	Name	Pos	Date of birth	Club
1	Liao Yu-Han	G	10 April 1995	(Taiwan) Silver Monster
3	Li Yu-Wei	D	15 October 1995	(Taiwan) Typhoon
4	Yang Hsiao-Hao	D	19 November 1995	(Taiwan) Typhoon
5	Kuan Ching (A)	D	16 July 1995	(Taiwan) Typhoon
6	Liang Ching-Ho	F	19 January 1994	(Taiwan) Silver Monster
7	Hsiao Po-Yun (C)	F	1 October 1995	(Taiwan) Silver Monster
8	Chen Wei-Chi	F	7 December 1995	(Taiwan) Typhoon
9	Chao Yu-Tung (A)	D	12 January 1994	(Taiwan) Silver Monster
10	Lu Shih-Kai	F	14 February 1996	(Taiwan) Silver Monster
11	Chang Tse-Wei	D	17 January 1997	(Taiwan) Silver Monster
12	Hung Chi-Lun	F	4 April 1996	(Taiwan) Typhoon
13	Li Jia-Lin	D	6 April 1994	(Taiwan) Kaohsiung Knights
15	Lin Yu-Heng	F	29 May 1995	(Taiwan) Vikings
16	Hsu Shao-Hung	F	5 March 1997	(Taiwan) Vikings
17	Syu Jing-Kai	F	17 July 1995	(Taiwan) Vikings
19	Ti Hou-Chung	F	10 September 1996	(Taiwan) Silver Monster
20	Kuei Fu-Hsiang	G	14 February 1996	(Taiwan) Typhoon
21	Wang Wei-Chun	F	2 February 1996	(Taiwan) Snowmen
22	Kuan Shin-Yao	F	27 January 1995	(Taiwan) Vikings
23	Lin Tzu-Chieh	F	17 September 1996	(Taiwan) Vikings
