= 2024 IIHF World U18 Championship Division III =

2024 IIHF U18 World Championship Division III
Tournament details
- Host countries: Turkey; South Africa
- Venue(s): 2 (in 2 host cities)
- Dates: 4–10 March 2024 (A); 4–7 March 2024 (B)
- Teams: 10

The 2024 IIHF U18 World Championship Division III were two international under-18 ice hockey tournaments organised by the International Ice Hockey Federation. The Divisions III A and III B represented the sixth and the seventh tier of the IIHF World U18 Championship.

== Division III A ==
2024 IIHF U18 World Championship Division III A

Tournament details
- Host country: Turkey
- City: Istanbul
- Venue(s): 1 (in 1 host city)
- Dates: 4–10 March 2024
- Teams: 6

Tournament statistics
- Games played: 15
- Goals scored: 149 (9.93 per game)
- Attendance: 4,515 (301 per game)
- Scoring leader(s): (Turkey) Emin İnandı (18 points)

Official website
- www.iihf.com

The Division III Group A tournament was played in Istanbul, Turkey, from 4 to 10 March 2024.

=== Participating teams ===
Team	Qualification
Belgium	Placed 6th in 2023 Division II B and were relegated
Iceland	Placed 2nd in 2023 Division III A
Turkey	Hosts; placed 3rd in 2023 Division III A
Mexico	Placed 4th in 2023 Division III A
Bosnia and Herzegovina	Placed 5th in 2023 Division III A
New Zealand	Placed 1st in 2023 Division III B and were promoted

=== Standings ===
Pos	Team	Pld	W	OTW	OTL	L	GF	GA	GD	Pts	Promotion or relegation
1	Belgium	5	5	0	0	0	33	11	+22	15	Promoted to the 2025 Division II B
2	Mexico	5	4	0	0	1	24	15	+9	12	
3	Turkey (H)	5	3	0	0	2	38	19	+19	9	
4	Iceland	5	2	0	0	3	26	19	+7	6	
5	New Zealand	5	1	0	0	4	21	31	−10	3	
6	Bosnia and Herzegovina	5	0	0	0	5	7	54	−47	0	Relegated to the 2025 Division III B

Source: IIHF
Rules for classification: 1) points; 2) head-to-head points; 3) head-to-head goal difference; 4) head-to-head number of goals scored; 5) result against closest best-ranked team outside tied teams; 6) result against second-best ranked team outside tied teams; 7) seeding before tournament.
(H) Host

=== Schedule ===
All times are local. (Turkey Time – UTC+3)

4 March 2024; 13:00	New Zealand	2–5 (1–1, 0–2, 1–2)	Mexico	Zeytinburnu Ice Rink, Istanbul; Attendance: 112

Game reference
6 min	Penalties	8 min
16	Shots	26

4 March 2024; 16:30	Iceland	13–1 (2–0, 6–1, 5–0)	Bosnia and Herzegovina	Zeytinburnu Ice Rink, Istanbul; Attendance: 72

Game reference
6 min	Penalties	2 min
50	Shots	10

4 March 2024; 20:00	Turkey	3–5 (1–1, 2–2, 0–2)	Belgium	Zeytinburnu Ice Rink, Istanbul; Attendance: 750

Game reference
8 min	Penalties	8 min
26	Shots	25

5 March 2024; 13:00	Bosnia and Herzegovina	2–7 (0–1, 1–3, 1–3)	New Zealand	Zeytinburnu Ice Rink, Istanbul; Attendance: 25

Game reference
8 min	Penalties	4 min
20	Shots	35

5 March 2024; 16:30	Belgium	8–0 (2–0, 6–0, 0–0)	Mexico	Zeytinburnu Ice Rink, Istanbul; Attendance: 110

Game reference
20 min	Penalties	12 min
35	Shots	19

5 March 2024; 20:00	Iceland	3–7 (0–4, 1–1, 2–2)	Turkey	Zeytinburnu Ice Rink, Istanbul; Attendance: 650

Game reference
2 min	Penalties	14 min
29	Shots	35

7 March 2024; 13:00	Belgium	9–2 (1–0, 2–2, 6–0)	Bosnia and Herzegovina	Zeytinburnu Ice Rink, Istanbul; Attendance: 55

Game reference
8 min	Penalties	10 min
54	Shots	5

7 March 2024; 16:30	Iceland	6–2 (1–1, 4–1, 1–0)	New Zealand	Zeytinburnu Ice Rink, Istanbul; Attendance: 65

Game reference
8 min	Penalties	10 min
33	Shots	26

7 March 2024; 20:00	Turkey	2–4 (1–1, 0–1, 1–2)	Mexico	Zeytinburnu Ice Rink, Istanbul; Attendance: 810

Game reference
39 min	Penalties	16 min
40	Shots	24

8 March 2024; 13:00	New Zealand	4–7 (1–3, 1–2, 2–2)	Belgium	Zeytinburnu Ice Rink, Istanbul; Attendance: 75

Game reference
10 min	Penalties	14 min
20	Shots	32

8 March 2024; 16:30	Mexico	5–2 (3–0, 1–1, 1–1)	Iceland	Zeytinburnu Ice Rink, Istanbul; Attendance: 99

Game reference
8 min	Penalties	6 min
19	Shots	31

8 March 2024; 20:00	Bosnia and Herzegovina	1–15 (0–4, 0–5, 1–6)	Turkey	Zeytinburnu Ice Rink, Istanbul; Attendance: 350

Game reference
14 min	Penalties	33 min
7	Shots	49

10 March 2024; 13:00	Mexico	10–1 (2–0, 3–0, 5–1)	Bosnia and Herzegovina	Zeytinburnu Ice Rink, Istanbul; Attendance: 50

Game reference
10 min	Penalties	18 min
44	Shots	10

10 March 2024; 16:30	Belgium	4–2 (3–1, 0–1, 1–0)	Iceland	Zeytinburnu Ice Rink, Istanbul; Attendance: 46

Game reference
10 min	Penalties	8 min
25	Shots	24

10 March 2024; 20:00	Turkey	11–6 (6–3, 4–0, 1–3)	New Zealand	Zeytinburnu Ice Rink, Istanbul; Attendance: 1,246

Game reference
4 min	Penalties	4 min
47	Shots	18

== Division III B ==
2024 IIHF U18 World Championship Division III B

Tournament details
- Host country: South Africa
- City: Cape Town
- Venue(s): 1 (in 1 host city)
- Dates: 4–7 March 2024
- Teams: 4

Tournament statistics
- Games played: 6
- Goals scored: 58 (9.67 per game)
- Attendance: 720 (120 per game)
- Scoring leader(s): (Thailand) Thananutch Kulthanthorn (9 points)

Official website
- www.iihf.com

The Division III Group B tournament was played in Cape Town, South Africa, from 4 to 7 March 2024.

=== Participating teams ===
Team	Qualification
Hong Kong	Placed 2nd in 2023 Division III B
Thailand	Placed 3rd in 2023 Division III B
South Africa	Hosts; placed 4th in 2023 Division III B
Turkmenistan	First participation in World Championship

=== Standings ===
Pos	Team	Pld	W	OTW	OTL	L	GF	GA	GD	Pts	Promotion
1	Hong Kong	3	2	0	0	1	20	7	+13	6 (Note: Hong Kong 3 Pts, +3 GD; Turkmenistan 3 Pts, 0 GD; Thailand 3 Pts, –3 GD)	Promoted to the 2025 Division III A
2	Turkmenistan	3	2	0	0	1	16	12	+4	6	
3	Thailand	3	2	0	0	1	17	10	+7	6	
4	South Africa (H)	3	0	0	0	3	5	29	−24	0	

Source: IIHF
Rules for classification: 1) points; 2) head-to-head points; 3) head-to-head goal difference; 4) head-to-head number of goals scored; 5) result against closest best-ranked team outside tied teams; 6) result against second-best ranked team outside tied teams; 7) seeding before tournament.
(H) Host

=== Schedule ===
All times are local. (South Africa Standard Time – UTC+2)

4 March 2024; 15:30	Thailand	2–7 (0–2, 1–2, 1–3)	Turkmenistan	Cape Town Ice Station; Attendance: 50

Game reference
8 min	Penalties	14 min
49	Shots	34

4 March 2024; 19:30	Hong Kong	11–1 (3–1, 5–0, 3–0)	South Africa	Cape Town Ice Station; Attendance: 150

Game reference
12 min	Penalties	8 min
41	Shots	13

5 March 2024; 15:30	Turkmenistan	3–8 (0–1, 3–3, 0–4)	Hong Kong	Cape Town Ice Station; Attendance: 30

Game reference
10 min	Penalties	14 min
35	Shots	28

5 March 2024; 19:30	Thailand	12–2 (5–0, 1–2, 6–0)	South Africa	Cape Town Ice Station; Attendance: 150

Game reference
10 min	Penalties	33 min
72	Shots	9

7 March 2024; 15:30	Hong Kong	1–3 (1–1, 0–1, 0–1)	Thailand	Cape Town Ice Station; Attendance: 40

Game reference
12 min	Penalties	10 min
24	Shots	30

7 March 2024; 19:30	South Africa	2–6 (0–1, 2–2, 0–3)	Turkmenistan	Cape Town Ice Station; Attendance: 300

Game reference
8 min	Penalties	22 min
23	Shots	29
