= Greece men's national under-18 ice hockey team =

The Greece men's national under-18 ice hockey team is the men's national under-18 ice hockey team of Greece. The team is controlled by the Hellenic Ice Sports Federation, a member of the International Ice Hockey Federation. The team has only participated in one international event, the 1996 IIHF European U18 Championship. The team did not have the minimum number of required players, and was disqualified. However, they still participated in the tournament. They lost to Israel and Yugoslavia, and beat Turkey 7-5.
