= 2000 IIHF Asian Oceanic Junior U18 Championship =

Tournament details
- Host countries: China; Thailand
- Dates: 17 – 20 February 2000; 25 – 28 March 2000
- Teams: 8

Final positions
- Champions: North Korea (2nd title)
- Runners-up: South Korea
- Third place: China

Tournament statistics
- Games played: 12
- Goals scored: 87 (7.25 per game)
- Attendance: 5,500 (458 per game)

The 2000 IIHF Asian Oceanic Junior U18 Championship was the 17th edition of the IIHF Asian Oceanic Junior U18 Championship. The Division I tournament took place between 17 and 20 February 2000 in Changchun City, China and the Division II tournament took place between 25 and 28 March 2000 in Bangkok, Thailand. The Division I tournament was won by North Korea, who claimed their second title by winning all three of their games and finishing first in the standings. Upon winning the tournament North Korea gained promotion to Division I of the 2001 IIHF World U18 Championships. South Korea and China finished second and third respectively.

In the Division II tournament New Zealand finished first and gained promotion to Division I for the 2001 competition.

== Overview ==
The Division I tournament began on 17 February 2000 in Changchun City, China. North Korea had gained promotion to Division I after finishing first in the Division II tournament at the 1999 IIHF Asian Oceanic Junior U18 Championship. North Korea won the tournament after winning all three of their games and claimed their second title, their first coming in 1987. Following their win North Korea gained promotion for the following year to Division I of the 2001 IIHF World U18 Championships. South Korea finished second after losing one game to North Korea and China finished third after losing to North Korea and South Korea. Australia who finished last also suffered the largest defeat of the tournament against China, losing 0 – 10. Han Jong of North Korea finished as the top scorer for the tournament with five points including four goals and an assist.

The Division II tournament began on 25 March 2000 in Bangkok, Thailand. The under-18 team of Mongolia made their debut appearance at the Championships and in international competition. New Zealand won the tournament after winning two of their games and drawing their game against Chinese Taipei and gained promotion to Division I for the 2001 IIHF Asian Oceanic U18 Championship. Chinese Taipei finished second behind New Zealand on goal difference and Thailand finished third after finishing above Mongolia only on goal difference. Philip Chou of Chinese Taipei finished as the top scorer for the tournament with eight points including seven goals and an assist.

== Division I ==
=== Standings ===
Pos	Team	Pld	W	D	L	GF	GA	GD	Pts
1	North Korea	3	3	0	0	16	3	+13	6
2	South Korea	3	2	0	1	15	7	+8	4
3	China	3	1	0	2	13	9	+4	2
4	Australia	3	0	0	3	2	27	−25	0

Source: IIHF

=== Fixtures ===
All times local.

17 February 2000; 12:30	North Korea	3 – 2 (1–0, 1–0, 1–2)	South Korea	Changchun City; Attendance: 500

Game reference

17 February 2000; 16:30	China	10 – 0 (3–0, 2–0, 4–0)	Australia	Changchun City; Attendance: 400

Game reference

18 February 2000; 12:30	South Korea	9 – 2 (1–1, 3–1, 5–0)	Australia	Changchun City; Attendance: 300

Game reference

18 February 2000; 16:30	China	1 – 5 (0–1, 1–0, 0–4)	North Korea	Changchun City; Attendance: 1000

Game reference

20 February 2000; 12:30	South Korea	4 – 2 (0–0, 4–2, 0–0)	China	Changchun City; Attendance: 800

Game reference

20 February 2000; 16:30	Australia	0 – 8 (0–3, 0–2, 0–3)	North Korea	Changchun City; Attendance: 500

Game reference

=== Scoring leaders ===
List shows the top ten skaters sorted by points, then goals.

Player	GP	G	A	Pts	+/−	PIM	POS
(North Korea) Han Jong	3	4	1	5	+7	2	F
(China) Man Yi	3	3	2	5	+2	8	D
(China) Du Chao	3	2	3	5	+2	2	F
(North Korea) Yun Myong	3	1	4	5	+8	8	F
(South Korea) Kwack Jae-Jun	3	2	2	4	+2	0	F
(South Korea) Lee Kwon Jae	3	2	2	4	0	10	F
(China) He Yufei	3	1	3	4	+2	4	F
(South Korea) Hwang Byung Wook	3	0	4	4	+3	2	D
(North Korea) Kim Hak	3	2	1	3	+4	0	F
(China) Fu Nan	3	2	1	3	-2	4	D

=== Leading goaltenders ===
Only the top five goaltenders, based on save percentage, who have played 40% of their team's minutes are included in this list.

Player	MIP	SOG	GA	GAA	SVS%	SO
(South Korea) Son Ho Seung	132:54	43	3	1.35	93.02	0
(North Korea) Ri Song	160:00	40	3	1.13	92.50	0
(China) An Dapeng	135:47	36	6	2.65	83.33	0
(Australia) Chris Leetham	106:45	87	15	8.43	82.76	0
(Australia) Robert Bradshaw	73:15	46	12	9.83	73.91	0

== Division II ==
=== Standings ===
Pos	Team	Pld	W	D	L	GF	GA	GD	Pts
1	New Zealand	3	2	1	0	15	6	+9	5
2	Chinese Taipei	3	2	1	0	12	6	+6	5
3	Thailand	3	0	1	2	7	14	−7	1
4	Mongolia	3	0	1	2	7	15	−8	1

Source: IIHF

=== Fixtures ===
All times local.

25 March 2000; 17:00	Thailand	1 – 3 (0–1, 1–1, 0–1)	Chinese Taipei	Bangkok; Attendance: 400

Game reference

25 March 2000; 20:00	Mongolia	1 – 5 (0–2, 0–1, 1–2)	New Zealand	Bangkok; Attendance: 350

Game reference

26 March 2000; 16:00	Mongolia	2 – 6 (1–2, 1–3, 0–1)	Chinese Taipei	Bangkok; Attendance: 300

Game reference

26 March 2000; 20:00	Thailand	2 – 7 (1–2, 0–3, 1–2)	New Zealand	Bangkok; Attendance: 350

Game reference

28 March 2000; 15:00	Chinese Taipei	3 – 3 (1–2, 1–0, 1–1)	New Zealand	Bangkok; Attendance: 300

Game reference

28 March 2000; 18:00	Thailand	4 – 4 (1–0, 1–2, 2–2)	Mongolia	Bangkok; Attendance: 300

Game reference

=== Scoring leaders ===
List shows the top ten skaters sorted by points, then goals.

Player	GP	G	A	Pts	+/−	PIM	POS
(Chinese Taipei) Philip Chou	3	7	1	8	+5	16	F
(New Zealand) Hamish Lewis	3	3	3	6	+6	12	F
(New Zealand) Timothy Faull	3	4	1	5	+5	0	F
(Thailand) Tewin Chartsuwan	3	3	1	4	-1	16	F
(Mongolia) Bat-Erdene Ayushbaatar	3	3	0	3	0	2	F
(New Zealand) David Bulling	3	2	1	3	+2	4	F
(Chinese Taipei) Ya-Hsien Lai	3	1	2	3	+2	0	F
(New Zealand) Laurie Horo	3	1	2	3	+3	22	D
(New Zealand) Christopher Jefferies	3	2	0	2	+1	0	F
(Mongolia) Bold Munkhtulga	3	2	0	2	-1	2	F

=== Leading goaltenders ===
Only the top goaltenders, based on save percentage, who have played 40% of their team's minutes are included in this list.

Player	MIP	SOG	GA	GAA	SVS%	SO
(Chinese Taipei) David Chang	180:00	63	6	2.00	90.48	0
(New Zealand) Kenneth O'Callaghan	179:15	62	6	2.01	90.32	0
(Thailand) Naratip Kanchanachongkol	120:00	61	11	5.50	81.97	0
(Mongolia) Enkhee Battulga	120:00	49	10	5.00	79.59	0
