= 2003 IIHF World U18 Championship Division III =

Tournament details
- Host countries: Mexico; Bosnia and Herzegovina
- Dates: 6 – 9 February 2003; 5 – 8 March 2003
- Teams: 8

The 2003 IIHF World U18 Championship Division III was a pair of international under-18 ice hockey tournaments run by the International Ice Hockey Federation. The Division III tournaments made up the fourth level of competition at the 2003 IIHF World U18 Championships. The Group A tournament took place between 5 and 8 March 2003 in Mexico City, Mexico and the Group B tournament took place between 6 and 9 February 2003 in Sarajevo, Bosnia and Herzegovina. The Group A competition was won by Australia while Iceland won the Group B tournament. Upon winning their respective tournaments both teams gained promotion to Division II of the 2004 IIHF World U18 Championships.

== Group A tournament ==
The Group A tournament began on 5 March 2003 in Mexico City, Mexico. All four teams participating made their debuts at the IIHF World U18 Championships. Australia won the tournament after winning all three of their games and gained promotion to Division II of the 2004 IIHF World U18 Championships. Mexico finished second after losing only to Australia and China finished third after losing to Australia and Mexico. New Zealand who finished last also suffered the largest defeat of the tournament, losing to Australia 1–14. Lliam Webster of Australia finished as the top scorer of the tournament with nine points including five goals and four assists. Australia's Patrick Baxter finished the tournament as the leading goaltender based on save percentage.

=== Standings ===
Pos	Team	Pld	W	D	L	GF	GA	GD	Pts	Promotion
1	Australia	3	3	0	0	28	6	+22	6	Promoted to Division II for 2004
2	Mexico	3	2	0	1	12	12	0	4	
3	China	3	1	0	2	11	12	−1	2	
4	New Zealand	3	0	0	3	2	23	−21	0	

Source: IIHF

=== Fixtures ===
All times local.

5 March 2003; 17:00	Australia	6–3 (3–2, 2–1, 1–0)	China	Mexico City; Attendance: 300

Game reference

5 March 2003; 20:00	Mexico	5–0 (3–0, 2–0, 0–0)	New Zealand	Mexico City; Attendance: 850

Game reference

6 March 2003; 17:00	China	4–1 (2–1, 1–0, 1–0)	New Zealand	Mexico City; Attendance: 300

Game reference

6 March 2003; 20:00	Mexico	2–8 (1–4, 1–2, 0–2)	Australia	Mexico City; Attendance: 800

Game reference

8 March 2003; 17:00	New Zealand	1–14 (0–3, 1–7, 0–4)	Australia	Mexico City; Attendance: 450

Game reference

8 March 2003; 20:00	China	4–5 (0–2, 3–1, 1–2)	Mexico	Mexico City; Attendance: 1600

Game reference

=== Scoring leaders ===
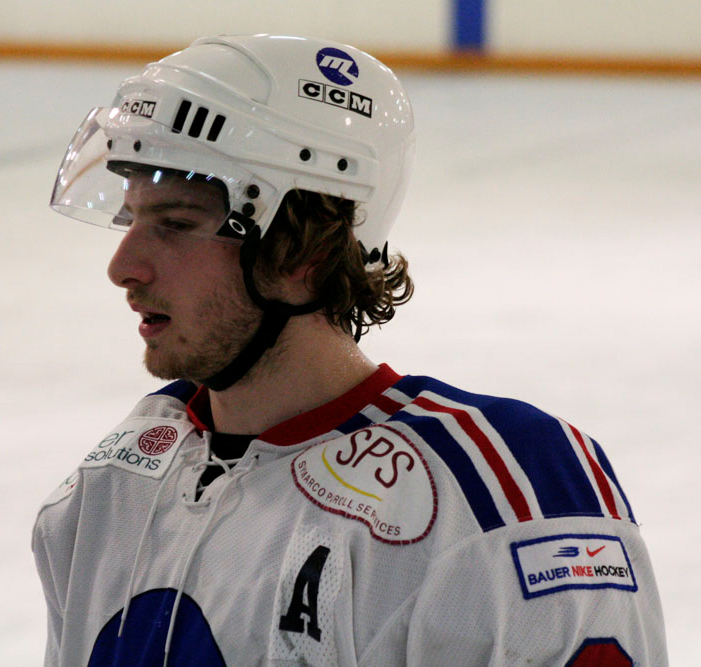
Lliam Webster of Australia finished first among the scoring leaders, recording five goals and four assists.

List shows the top ten skaters sorted by points, then goals.

Player	GP	G	A	Pts	+/−	PIM	POS
(Australia) Lliam Webster	3	5	4	9	+7	4	F
(China) Dong Liang	3	3	5	8	+3	2	F
(Australia) David Dunwoodie	3	5	2	7	+9	6	F
(Australia) Warren Jayawardene	3	5	2	7	+8	16	F
(Australia) Scott Stephenson	3	4	2	6	+8	2	F
(Mexico) Eduardo Glennie	3	5	0	5	+2	2	F
(Australia) Peter Matus	3	4	1	5	+4	2	D
(Mexico) Adrian Cervantes	3	2	3	5	+2	10	F
(Australia) Adrian Esposito	3	2	2	4	+4	6	F
(Australia) Luke Makris	3	2	1	3	+3	0	F

=== Leading goaltenders ===
Only the top goaltenders, based on save percentage, who have played 40% of their team's minutes are included in this list.

Player	MIP	SOG	GA	GAA	SVS%	SO
(Australia) Patrick Baxter	120:00	39	4	2.00	89.74	0
(China) Xie Ming	100:00	51	5	3.60	88.24	0
(Mexico) Alfonso de Alba	145:26	85	10	4.13	88.24	0
(New Zealand) Gareth Livingstone	128:40	70	12	5.60	82.86	0
(China) Wu Huizi	80:00	33	6	4.50	81.82	0

== Group B tournament ==
The Group B tournament began on 6 February 2003 in Sarajevo, Bosnia and Herzegovina. Turkey who finished last in Division III at the 2002 IIHF World U18 Championships returned to compete in this year's Division III tournament, Israel returned to the World Championships having not played since 2001, Iceland made their first appearance in the Division having only previously played in a qualification tournament in 2001, and Bosnia and Herzegovina made their debut appearance at the World Championships. Iceland won the tournament after winning all three of their games and gained promotion to Division II of the 2004 IIHF World U18 Championships. Turkey finished second after beating both Bosnia and Herzegovina and Israel on goal difference and Bosnia and Herzegovina finished in third. Israel who had original won their first two games against Iceland and Bosnia and Herzegovina had the results annulled and scored 5–0 in favour of the opposing teams due to their use of three players who did not meet the International Ice Hockey Federation's eligibility criteria. Israel had originally won the games 9–1 against Bosnia and Herzegovina and 5–4 against Iceland. Birgir Jakob Hansen of Iceland finished as the top scorer of the tournament with ten points including five goals and five assists.

=== Standings ===
Pos	Team	Pld	W	D	L	GF	GA	GD	Pts	Promotion
1	Iceland	3	3	0	0	19	4	+15	6	Promoted to Division II for 2004
2	Turkey	3	1	0	2	16	11	+5	2	
3	Bosnia and Herzegovina	3	1	0	2	8	19	−11	2	
4	Israel	3	1	0	2	5	14	−9	2	

Source: IIHF

=== Fixtures ===
All times local.

6 February 2003; 16:30	Iceland	5–2 (2–2, 2–0, 1–0)	Turkey	Sarajevo; Attendance: 300

Game reference

6 February 2003; 19:30	Israel	0–5	Bosnia and Herzegovina	Sarajevo; Attendance: 350

Game reference

8 February 2003; 16:30	Israel	0–5	Iceland	Sarajevo; Attendance: 300

Game reference

8 February 2003; 19:30	Turkey	10–1 (0–0, 3–0, 7–1)	Bosnia and Herzegovina	Sarajevo; Attendance: 400

Game reference

9 February 2003; 16:30	Turkey	4–5 (2–2, 2–1, 0–2)	Israel	Sarajevo; Attendance: 300

Game reference

9 February 2003; 19:30	Bosnia and Herzegovina	2–9 (0–5, 1–2, 1–2)	Iceland	Sarajevo; Attendance: 600

Game reference

=== Scoring leaders ===
List shows the top ten skaters sorted by points, then goals.

Player	GP	G	A	Pts	+/−	PIM	POS
(Iceland) Birgir Jakob Hansen	3	5	5	10	+8	6	F
(Turkey) Serkan Yapicilar	3	3	6	9	+1	4	F
(Iceland) Gauti Thormodsson	3	5	1	6	+5	2	F
(Turkey) Erhan Uretmen	3	4	1	5	+3	4	F
(Turkey) Ufuk Guclu	3	3	1	4	+1	12	F
(Turkey) Gokhun Ozturk	3	1	3	4	0	0	D
(Bosnia and Herzegovina) Zlatko Dugancic	3	3	0	3	−6	12	D
(Israel) Roman Larin	3	2	1	3	+4	22	F
(Turkey) Arda Ozcelik	3	2	0	2	0	4	D
(Israel) Oren Zamir	3	2	0	2	+2	25	D
