= 2006 IIHF World U18 Championship Division III =

Tournament details
- Host country: Romania
- Dates: 13 – 19 March 2006
- Teams: 6

The 2006 IIHF World U18 Championship Division III was an international under-18 ice hockey tournament run by the International Ice Hockey Federation. The Division III tournament made up the fourth level of competition at the 2006 IIHF World U18 Championships and took place between 13 and 19 March 2006 in Miercurea Ciuc, Romania. The tournament was won by Romania who upon winning gained promotion, along with Israel who finished in second place, to Division II of the 2007 IIHF World U18 Championships.

== Overview ==
The 2006 IIHF World U18 Championship Division III began on 13 March 2006 in Miercurea Ciuc, Romania. Bulgaria, Israel, New Zealand and Turkey all returned to compete in the Division III competition after missing promotion at the previous years World Championships. Romania and South Africa entered the Division III competition after being relegated from the Division II tournaments of the 2005 IIHF World U18 Championships.

Romania finished first after winning all five of their games and gained promotion to Division II of the 2007 IIHF World U18 Championships. Israel who finished in second place also gained promotion to Division II, while South Africa finished third after managing to win only two and tie one of their five games of the tournament. Bulgaria and Turkey who finished fifth and sixth respectively were relegated to the Division III Qualification tournament for the 2007 IIHF World U18 Championships. Daniel Erlich of Israel finished as the tournaments top scorer after recording 26 points including 12 goals and 14 assists. Romania's Istvan Csergo finished as the tournaments leading goaltender with a save percentage of 96.00.

== Standings ==
Pos	Team	Pld	W	D	L	GF	GA	GD	Pts	Promotion or relegation
1	Romania	5	5	0	0	68	3	+65	10	Promoted to Division II for 2007
2	Israel	5	3	1	1	42	26	+16	7	Promoted to Division II for 2007
3	South Africa	5	2	1	2	25	22	+3	5	
4	New Zealand	5	1	3	1	28	26	+2	5	
5	Bulgaria	5	1	1	3	10	41	−31	3	Relegated to Division III Qualification for 2007
6	Turkey	5	0	0	5	8	63	−55	0	Relegated to Division III Qualification for 2007

=== Fixtures ===
All times local.

13 March 2006; 13:30	New Zealand	4–4 (0–1, 3–1, 1–2)	South Africa	Vakar Lajos Icerink; Attendance: 50

Game reference

13 March 2006; 17:00	Turkey	3–14 (0–4, 1–6, 2–4)	Israel	Vakar Lajos Icerink; Attendance: 130

Game reference

13 March 2006; 20:30	Bulgaria	0–18 (0–3, 0–7, 0–8)	Romania	Vakar Lajos Icerink; Attendance: 300

Game reference

14 March 2006; 13:30	South Africa	12–1 (3–0, 4–1, 5–0)	Turkey	Vakar Lajos Icerink; Attendance: 150

Game reference

14 March 2006; 17:00	Israel	14–1 (4–0, 5–1, 5–0)	Bulgaria	Vakar Lajos Icerink; Attendance: 180

Game reference

14 March 2006; 20:30	Romania	14–0 (2–0, 3–0, 9–0)	New Zealand	Vakar Lajos Icerink; Attendance: 300

Game reference

16 March 2006; 13:30	South Africa	5–8 (3–4, 2–3, 0–1)	Israel	Vakar Lajos Icerink; Attendance: 145

Game reference

16 March 2006; 17:00	Bulgaria	3–3 (0–2, 1–1, 2–0)	New Zealand	Vakar Lajos Icerink; Attendance: 100

Game reference

16 March 2006; 20:30	Romania	15–1 (4–0, 6–1, 5–0)	Turkey	Vakar Lajos Icerink; Attendance: 470

Game reference

17 March 2006; 13:30	South Africa	4–1 (0–0, 2–1, 2–0)	Bulgaria	Vakar Lajos Icerink; Attendance: 50

Game reference

17 March 2006; 17:00	New Zealand	17–1 (7–1, 6–0, 4–0)	Turkey	Vakar Lajos Icerink; Attendance: 100

Game reference

17 March 2006; 20:30	Israel	2–13 (0–5, 1–4, 1–4)	Romania	Vakar Lajos Icerink; Attendance: 1500

Game reference

19 March 2006; 13:30	Turkey	2–5 (1–2, 1–1, 0–2)	Bulgaria	Vakar Lajos Icerink; Attendance: 40

Game reference

19 March 2006; 17:00	Israel	4–4 (1–2, 1–0, 2–2)	New Zealand	Vakar Lajos Icerink; Attendance: 200

Game reference

19 March 2006; 20:30	Romania	8–0 (5–0, 1–0, 2–0)	South Africa	Vakar Lajos Icerink; Attendance: 1000

Game reference

== Scoring leaders ==
List shows the top ten skaters sorted by points, then goals.

Player	GP	G	A	Pts	+/−	PIM	POS
(Israel) Daniel Erlich	5	12	14	26	+13	32	F
(Romania) Otto Biro	5	8	10	18	+16	12	F
(Romania) Attila Balint	5	10	7	17	+16	0	F
(Romania) Cjanad Virag	5	6	9	19	+17	18	F
(Israel) Eli Sherbatov	5	6	8	14	+5	8	F
(Romania) Zsolt Kopacz	5	4	10	14	+16	10	F
(Romania) Hunor Szabo	5	6	6	12	+17	2	F
(South Africa) Jared Joyce	5	6	6	12	+4	26	F
(Romania) Nicolae Burdian	5	5	7	12	+11	4	F
(Israel) Oren Zamir	5	7	4	11	+6	33	F

== Leading goaltenders ==
Only the top five goaltenders, based on save percentage, who have played 40% of their team's minutes are included in this list.

Player	MIP	SOG	GA	GAA	SVS%	SO
(Romania) Istvan Csergo	150:47	25	1	0.40	96.00	2
(Romania) Botond Csomortani	149:13	25	2	0.80	92.00	2
(New Zealand) Zak Nothling	193:08	121	17	5.28	85.95	0
(Israel) Eden Nemenoff	285:08	139	22	4.63	84.17	0
(Bulgaria) Kiril Vajarov	280:00	215	36	7.71	83.26	0
