= Azattyk Arena =

New stadium in Bishkek, Kyrgyzstan

Bishkek Arena
- Бишкек Арена
- Bishkek Arena in August 2026
- Interactive map of Bishkek Arena
- Full name: Bishkek Arena
- Former names: National Stadium (planning/construction)
- Location: Orok, Bishkek, Kyrgyzstan
- Coordinates: 42°49′36.4″N 74°31′26.4″E
- Owner: Kyrgyz Football Union
- Capacity: 51,000
- Surface: GrassMaster
- Field size: 105 m × 68 m (344 ft × 223 ft)
- Acreage: 20.78 ha (51.3 acres)

Construction
- Groundbreaking: March 2024; 2 years ago
- Built: 2024–2026
- Opened: August 31, 2026
- Cost: US$ 60 million

Tenant
- Kyrgyzstan national football team (TBD)

The Bishkek Arena (Бишкек Арена) is a football stadium in Bishkek, Kyrgyzstan. It is scheduled to host the home matches of the Kyrgyzstan national football team. It is the largest stadium in Kyrgyzstan and in Central Asia.

The stadium's construction part of a larger public spending spree by Sadyr Japarov's authoritarian regime. The construction companies tasked with building the stadium are shrouded in mystery, although it is known that at least one of the companies has ties with Japarov.

== Construction history ==
On May 6, 2023, FIFA president Gianni Infantino called for a new national football stadium to be built in Kyrgyzstan to aid the development of the sport in the country. In May 2023, an area of 20.78 hectares was allocated for the stadium in the Orok rural district of the Sokuluk District in the Chüy Region.

On August 30, 2023, a capsule was laid for the construction of a new stadium in the village of Orok.

Initially, the construction of the stadium was estimated to cost $60 million.

Construction began in early 2024, and it was scheduled to open on August 31, 2026.

On 17 February, 2025, a decision was made to increase the capacity of the new stadium under construction from 45,000 to 51,000 seats. This change was made to meet the requirements of the Asian Football Confederation, which mandates that the stadium must accommodate at least 50,000 spectators for the opening ceremony, the opening match, and the final of the AFC Asian Cup. The adjustments to the project will not affect the construction timeline, and completion is still scheduled for 2026. On 24 February 2025, the Central Asian Football Association announced a historic bid to bring the 2031 AFC Asian Cup to Central Asia for the first time.

On October 14, 2025, the stadium was named Azattyk Arena, but later was renamed to Bishkek Arena.

On August 31, 2026, the stadium opened, with a yurt-shaped multi-purpose design and a seating capacity of 51,252. Built at a cost of US$386 million, it is the largest stadium in Central Asia, meets FIFA standards, and features eight levels with retail and accessibility facilities. The arena hosted the opening ceremony of the 6th World Nomad Games.

== Design ==
It was originally planned that the stadium to have 45,000 seats. In February 2025, changes were made to the construction project, and the capacity of the stadium will increase to 51,000 seats.

The architectural design is adapted to the national values of the Kyrgyz people and resembles a traditional yurt. The roof will feature two sets of four beams crossed in an X-shape, reminiscent of the tündük, the crown of a Kyrgyz yurt, as seen on the flag of Kyrgyzstan. The facade is designed in the shape of the yurt’s characteristic lattice wooden framework.

The stadium structure is a closed rectangular plan with corner insertions, consisting of a three-tiered stand, first-floor under-stand facilities, second and third-floor distribution galleries, elevated levels offering field views (fourth and fifth floors), and a canopy above all stands. The corner sections of the stadium will feature four lighting masts, and additional field lighting will be provided by floodlights located around the perimeter of the canopy above the stands.

The dimensions of both the main field and the training field will comply with FIFA standards. The pitch lighting will be LED-based, categorized as A by FIFA.

On an area of 35,000 square meters, in addition to the stadium, sports stores and shopping centers will be built.

The commercial infrastructure includes a shopping center with an area of 35,916 square meters, 48 stores, a supermarket, 18 retail kiosks, 23 restaurants, 11 cafes, 4 cinemas, a children's playground, a gym and terraces with a total area of 5,087 square meters.

=== Technical specifications ===
- Building footprint: 70,000 square meters
- Total construction area: 180,000 square meters
- Eight floors with a height of 70 meters
- Stadium diameter: 280 meters, with a total area of 85,000 square meters
- Covered parking for 3,600 cars and technical facilities covering 60,000 square meters.

== Concerts ==
Notable concerts at Bishkek Arena since 2026 include:

- August 31, 2026 – Nicole Scherzinger
- September 18, 2026 – Akon, Nana , Ne-Yo
- October 5, 2026 – Redfoo
- October 18, 2026 – Shakira - Las Mujeres Ya No Lloran World Tour

== See also ==
- Football in Kyrgyzstan
