= 2002 IIHF Asian Oceanic U18 Championship =

International ice hockey competition

Tournament details
- Host country: New Zealand
- Venue(s): 1 (in 1 host city)
- Dates: 10–15 March
- Teams: 6

Final positions
- Champions: China (2nd title)
- Runners-up: Australia
- Third place: New Zealand

Tournament statistics
- Games played: 15
- Goals scored: 242 (16.13 per game)
- Attendance: 4,500 (300 per game)
- Scoring leader(s): (China) Wang Zhiqiang

The 2002 IIHF Asian Oceanic U18 Championship was the 19th and final IIHF Asian Oceanic U18 Championships. It took place between 10 and 15 March 2002 in Auckland, New Zealand. The tournament was won by China, who claimed their second title by defeating all five other nations. Australia and New Zealand finished second and third respectively.

== Overview ==
The 2002 IIHF Asian Oceanic U18 Championship began on 10 March 2002 in Auckland, New Zealand. The first game was played between Chinese Taipei and Mongolia with Mongolia winning the game 5–2. China won the tournament winning all five games against the opposing nations and claimed their second title after first winning the 1988 tournament. Australia finished second, losing only to China in their five games and New Zealand finished third after losing to Australia and China. Thailand, who finished last, also suffered the largest defeat of the tournament against Australia, going down 38–1. Following the tournament all teams were offered entry into Division III of the IIHF World U18 Championship, making the 2002 IIHF Asian Oceanic U18 Championship the final tournament.

== Standings ==
Pos	Team	Pld	W	D	L	GF	GA	GD	Pts
1	China	5	5	0	0	80	5	+75	10
2	Australia	5	4	0	1	74	13	+61	8
3	New Zealand	5	3	0	2	51	14	+37	6
4	Mongolia	5	2	0	3	19	46	−27	4
5	Chinese Taipei	5	1	0	4	11	59	−48	2
6	Thailand	5	0	0	5	7	105	−98	0

Source: IIHF

== Fixtures ==
All times local.

10 March 2002; 11:30	Chinese Taipei	2–5 (1–1, 0–3, 1–1)	Mongolia	Auckland; Attendance: 300

Game reference

10 March 2002; 16:15	New Zealand	2–7 (0–4, 0–0, 2–3)	Australia	Auckland; Attendance: 300

Game reference

10 March 2002; 19:15	Thailand	0–31 (0–13, 0–14, 0–4)	China	Auckland; Attendance: 300

Game reference

11 March 2002; 12:30	China	5–0 (2–0, 2–0, 1–0)	New Zealand	Auckland; Attendance: 300

Game reference

11 March 2002; 16:00	Australia	16–1 (7–0, 4–0, 5–1)	Chinese Taipei	Auckland; Attendance: 300

Game reference

11 March 2002; 19:15	Mongolia	10–4 (6–0, 1–2, 3–2)	Thailand	Auckland; Attendance: 300

Game reference

12 March 2002; 12:30	Australia	9–2 (3–0, 2–2, 4–0)	Mongolia	Auckland; Attendance: 300

Game reference

12 March 2002; 16:00	China	20–0 (3–0, 7–0, 10–0)	Chinese Taipei	Auckland; Attendance: 300

Game reference

12 March 2002; 19:15	Thailand	0–19 (0–10, 0–4, 0–5)	New Zealand	Auckland; Attendance: 300

Game reference

14 March 2002; 09:00	Australia	38–1 (7–0, 15–1, 16–0)	Thailand	Auckland; Attendance: 300

Game reference

14 March 2002; 12:05	New Zealand	16–1 (5–0, 3–1, 8–0)	Chinese Taipei	Auckland; Attendance: 300

Game reference

14 March 2002; 15:15	Mongolia	1–17 (1–5, 0–5, 0–7)	China	Auckland; Attendance: 300

Game reference

15 March 2002; 09:00	Chinese Taipei	7–2 (3–0, 1–1, 3–1)	Thailand	Auckland; Attendance: 300

Game reference

15 March 2002; 12:05	China	7–4 (2–1, 2–2, 3–1)	Australia	Auckland; Attendance: 300

Game reference

15 March 2002; 15:15	Mongolia	1–14 (0–2, 0–7, 1–5)	New Zealand	Auckland; Attendance: 300

Game reference

== Statistics ==
=== Scoring leaders ===
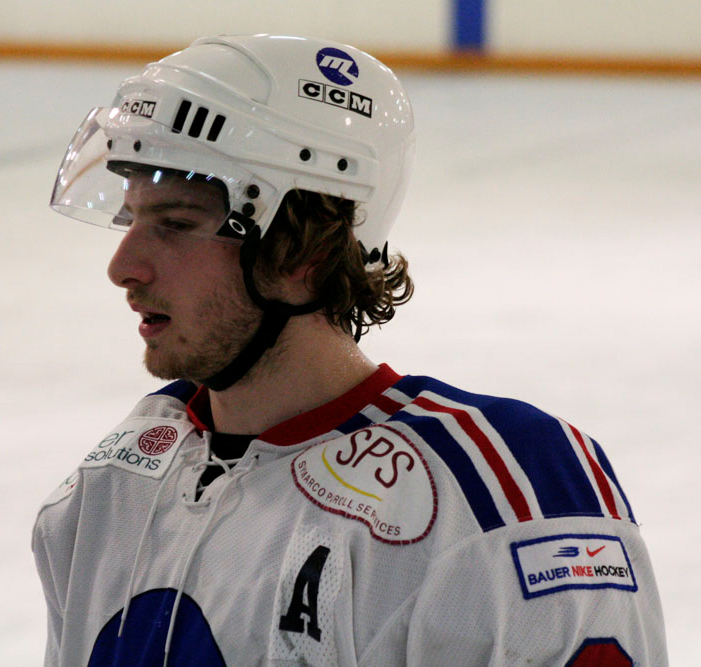
Lliam Webster of Australia finished third among the scoring leaders, recording eight goals and ten assists.

List shows the top ten skaters sorted by points, then goals.

Player	GP	G	A	Pts	+/−	PIM	POS
(China) Wang Zhiqiang	5	11	12	23	+28	4	F
(China) Wang Dakai	5	11	8	19	+29	6	F
(Australia) Lliam Webster	5	8	10	18	+15	12	D
(China) Cui Xijun	5	12	3	15	+22	14	F
(China) Li Yandi	5	8	7	15	+21	18	F
(New Zealand) Timothy Faull	5	8	6	14	+17	2	F
(Australia) Warren Jayawardene	5	7	7	14	+16	8	F
(Australia) Paul Meyer	5	6	8	14	+15	10	F
(Australia) Scott Stephenson	5	8	5	13	+15	2	F
(Australia) Oliver Rozdarz	5	5	6	11	+12	6	F

Source: IIHF.com

=== Leading goaltenders ===
Only the top five goaltenders, based on save percentage, who have played 40% of their team's minutes are included in this list.

Player	MIP	SOG	GA	GAA	SVS%	SO
(China) Xie Ming	140:00	49	5	2.14	89.80	0
(New Zealand) Johnathan Faull	240:00	118	14	3.50	88.14	0
(Chinese Taipei) David Chang	266:15	311	47	10.59	84.89	0
(Australia) Luke Read	180:00	59	9	3.00	84.75	0
(Mongolia) Nyamdorj Batsaikhan	274:08	249	39	8.54	84.34	0

Source: IIHF.com
