= Mongolian Ice Hockey Federation =

Ice hockey governing body in Mongolia

Mongolia
- Association name: Mongolian Ice Hockey Federation
- IIHF Code: MGL
- Founded: 1995
- IIHF membership: May 15, 1999
- President: Javkhlan Bold
- IIHF men's ranking: 50
- IIHF women's ranking: N/A

The Mongolian Hockey Federation (MIHF; Mongolian: Монголын Хоккейн Холбоо) is the governing body of ice hockey in Mongolia. The federation was founded in 1995. It controls the Mongolia Ice Hockey League, as well as the Mongolian national ice hockey team, whose first appearance in an IIHF event was the 2007 IIHF World Championship Division III tournament. They have since taken part in the 2008 IIHF World Championship Division III. In October 2012, their last appearance was the 2013 IIHF World Championship Division III Qualification in Abu Dhabi, United Arab Emirates.
