= South Africa men's national under-18 ice hockey team =

The South Africa men's national under-18 ice hockey team is the men's national under-18 ice hockey team of South Africa. The team is controlled by the South African Ice Hockey Association, a member of the International Ice Hockey Federation. The team represents South Africa at the IIHF World U18 Championships.

== International competitions ==
=== IIHF Asian Oceanic U18 Championships ===
- 1999: 2nd in Division II (6th overall)

=== IIHF World U18 Championships ===
Year	City	Country	Result
1999			2nd place in DIV II
2000	Sofia	Bulgaria	7th place in European Championships Div II
2001	Sofia	Bulgaria	4th place in Division III
2002	Kaunas	Lithuania	5th place in Division III
2003	Belgrade	FR Yugoslavia	6th place in Division II Group B
2004	Sofia	Bulgaria	Silver in Division III
2005	Kohtla-Järve	Estonia	6th place in Division II Group A
2006	Miercurea Ciuc	Romania	Bronze in Division III
2007	Beijing	China	5th place in Division III
2008	Mexico City	Mexico	4th place in Division III Group A
2009	Taipei	Chinese Taipei	4th place in Division III Group A
2010	Mexico City	Mexico	Bronze in Division III Group B
2011	Mexico City	Mexico	Bronze in Division III Group B
2012	Sofia	Bulgaria	6th place in Division III
2013	İzmit	Turkey	Silver in Division III Group B
2014	İzmit	Turkey	Gold in Division III Group B
2015	Taipei City	Chinese Taipei	6th in Division III Group A
2016	Cape Town	South Africa	Silver in Division III Group B
2017	Mexico City	Mexico	Bronze in Division III Group B
2018	Queenstown	New Zealand	Bronze in Division III Group B
2019	Cape Town	South Africa	Bronze in Division III Group B
2020	Cancelled due to the COVID-19 pandemic.		
2021	Cancelled due to the COVID-19 pandemic.		
2022	Sarajevo	Bosnia and Herzegovina	Bronze in Division III Group B
2023	Cape Town	South Africa	4th in Division III Group B
2024	Cape Town	South Africa	4th in Division III Group B
