= Turkey men's national under-18 ice hockey team =

Turkey
- The crescent moon and a star as seen on the Turkish flag is the badge used on the players jerseys.
- Association: Turkish Ice Hockey Federation
- Head coach: (Turkey) Yucel Citak
- Assistants: (Turkey) Cengiz Akyildiz (Turkey) Caner Baykan
- Captain: Eren Gökcen
- Team colors
- IIHF code: TUR

IIHF World U18 Championships
- Appearances: 11 (first in 2002)

The Turkey men's national under-18 ice hockey team is the men's national under-18 ice hockey team of Turkey. The team is controlled by the Turkish Ice Hockey Federation, a member of the International Ice Hockey Federation. The team represents Turkey at the IIHF World U18 Championships.

== Best Win/Lose ==
FR Yugoslavia 52-1 Turkey 1997

Turkey 24-0 Armenia 2008

== Results summary ==
As of 1 Jan 2023.

OTW and OTL Suppose Draw.

#	Games	M	W	D	L	GF	GA	GD
1	IIHF European Junior Championships	13	0	0	13	20	292	-272
2	IIHF World U18 Championships	83	26	4	53	299	524	-225
Total	-	96	26	4	66	319	816	-497

== International competitions ==
=== Results ===
#	Year	M	W	D	L	GF	GA	GD
X	1968-1992	DNE						
1	1995 IIHF European U18 Championship	5	0	0	5	8	126	-118
2	1996 IIHF European U18 Championship	3	0	0	3	6	70	-64
3	1997 IIHF European U18 Championship	5	0	0	5	6	96	-90
X	1998	DNE						
Total	3/31	13	0	0	13	20	292	-272

=== IIHF World U18 Championships ===
- 1999: Did not participate
- 2000: Did not qualify (2nd In European Division II Qualification Group B)
- 2001: 1st in Division III Qualification for 2002
- 2002: 8th in Division III
- 2003: 2nd in Division III Group B
- 2004: 6th in Division III
- 2005: 5th in Division III
- 2006: 6th in Division III
- 2007: 6th in Division III
- 2008: 2nd in Division III Group B
- 2009: 2nd in Division III Group B
- 2010: 2nd in Division III Group A
- 2011: 4th in Division III Group A
- 2012: Did not participate
- 2013: 3rd in Division III Group B
- 2014: 2nd in Division III Group B
- 2015: 1st in Division III Group B
- 2016: 2nd in Division III Group A
- 2017: 5th in Division III Group A
- 2018: 5th in Division III Group A
- 2019: 4th in Division III Group A
- 2020: Cancelled due to the COVID-19 pandemic
- 2021: Cancelled due to the COVID-19 pandemic
- 2022: 6th in Division III Group A
- 2023: 3rd in Division III Group A

=== Results ===
OTW and OTL (Since 2007) Suppose Draw.

#	Year	M	W	D	L	GF	GA	GD
X	1999	DNE						
1	2000	1	0	0	1	1	3	-2
2	2001	1	1	0	0	5	4	+1
3	2002	4	0	0	4	6	47	-41
4	2003	3	1	0	2	16	11	+5
5	2004	6	1	0	5	12	40	-28
6	2005	7	3	0	4	27	55	-28
7	2006	5	0	0	5	8	63	-55
8	2007	6	0	1	5	8	70	-62
9	2008	4	2	0	2	34	26	+8
10	2009	5	3	0	2	36	37	-1
11	2010	4	2	1	1	32	13	+19
12	2011	5	0	0	5	7	53	-46
X	2012	DNE						
13	2013	3	1	0	2	13	13	0
14	2014	2	1	0	1	6	4	+2
15	2015	2	2	0	0	14	5	+9
16	2016	5	3	1	1	21	13	+8
17	2017	5	1	0	4	19	39	-20
18	2018	5	2	0	3	11	14	-3
19	2019	5	3	0	2	15	14	+1
X	2020	Cancelled						
X	2021	Cancelled						
20	2022	5	0	1	4	8	24	-16
21	2023	TBD						
Total	21/25	83	26	4	53	299	524	-225

== Roster ==
#	Name	Pos	Date of Birth	Club
1	Berk Akın	GK	1996-11-14	(Turkey) B.B. Ankara SK
2	Eren Doru	D	1997-03-02	(Turkey) Kocaeli B.B. Kağıt SK
3	Emrah Savaş	F	1997-04-01	(Turkey)
4	Fatih Faner	D	1997-03-12	(Turkey) Erzurum Gençlik SK
5	Ömer Aksu	D	1997-11-26	(Turkey)
6	Abdülkadir İnanç	D	1995-09-05	(Turkey) Erzurum Gençlik SK
7	Tolga Tansel Oflaz	F	1996-06-18	(Turkey) Başkent Yıldızları
8	Mustafa Bahçe (A)	F	1997-11-25	(Turkey) B.B. Ankara SK
9	Berkant Göksel Oflaz	F	1996-06-18	(Turkey) Başkent Yıldızları
10	Mehmet Kiraz (C)	F	1996-07-13	(Turkey) B.B. Ankara SK
11	Egemen Küçüktaş	D	1995-04-01	(Turkey) Başkent Yıldızları
12	Ercan Kuntel	F	1997-05-03	(Turkey)
14	Can Kaya	F	1997-10-11	(Turkey) B.B. Ankara SK
15	Berk Üstün (A)	F	1996-04-24	(Turkey) Boğaziçi Paten K
16	Kaan Özdemir	F	1997-03-26	(Turkey)
17	Sefa Kavaz	F	1997-07-17	(Turkey) Erzurum Gençlik SK
18	Sefa Takar	F	1997-05-25	(Turkey) Erzurum Gençlik SK
20	Muhammed Karagül	GK	1997-06-01	(Turkey) Erzurum Gençlik SK
22	Burgaz Ayaz	F	1997-12-01	(Turkey)
24	Ömer Kars	F	1997-04-24	(Turkey) Erzurum Gençlik SK

== Notable players ==
- Berk Akın (GK), Best Goalkeeper - 2013 IIHF World U18 Championships-Division III Group B
- Fatih Faner (D), Best Player selected by team coach - 2013 IIHF World U18 Championships-Division III Group B
