= Serbia and Montenegro men's national under-18 ice hockey team =

The Serbia and Montenegro Men's National Under-18 Ice Hockey team was the men's national under-18 ice hockey team in Serbia and Montenegro. When Serbia and Montenegro split in 2006, it became the Serbia's Men's National Under-18 Ice Hockey team.

== International competitions ==
=== IIHF World U18 Championships ===
- 1999: 8th in Division I Europe
- 2000: 3rd in Division II Europe
- 2001: 7th in Division III
- 2002: 2nd in Division III
- 2003: 4th in Division II Group B
- 2004: 5th in Division II Group B
- 2005: 5th in Division II Group A
- 2006: 5th in Division II Group A
