= Uzbekistan men's national under-18 ice hockey team =

- Association: Uzbekistan Ice Hockey Federation
- General manager: (Russia) Gadel Gumerov
- Head coach: (Russia) Dmitri Makarov
- Assistants: (Uzbekistan) Abdurashid Musaliev
- Captain: Mukhammaddiyor Ganiev
- Top scorer: Jasurbek Rustamkhonov
- Team colours
- IIHF code: UZB
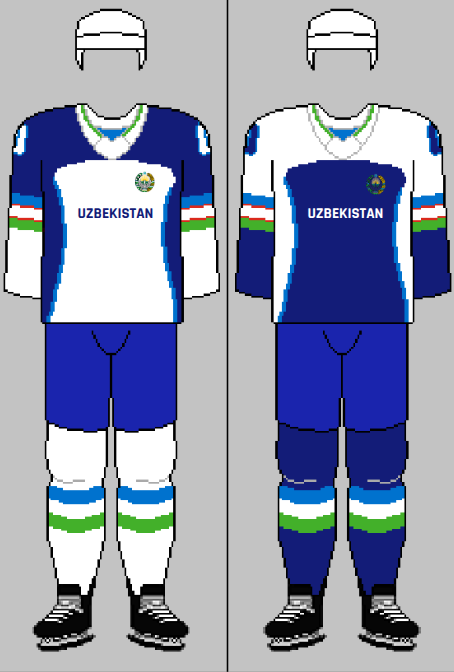

First international
- Uzbekistan 5–0 Turkmenistan (Ulaanbaatar, Mongolia; 11 March 2023)

Biggest win
- Uzbekistan 29–0 Malaysia (Tashkent, Uzbekistan; 25 April 2024)

Biggest defeat
- None

IIHF World U18 Championship
- Appearances: 2 (first in 2025)
- Best result: 35th (2026)

IIHF Asian Oceanic U18 Championship
- Appearances: 3 (first in 2023)
- Best result: (2023, 2024, 2026)

International record (W–L–T)
- 26–0–0

The Uzbekistan U-18 national ice hockey team is the U-18 national men's ice hockey team of Uzbekistan. They have competed in four international tournaments since 2023 and are associated with the Uzbekistan Ice Hockey Federation, and a member of the International Ice Hockey Federation.

== History ==
Uzbekistan's first U-18 tournament was played in 2023 at the 2023 IIHF U18 Asia and Oceania Championship, in Ulaanbaatar, Mongolia. They finished 5–0 and outscored their opponents 44-8 in a winning start for Uzbekistan.

The next year, Uzbekistan once again didn't compete in the world championships, but decided to play at the 2024 IIHF U18 Asia and Oceania Championship, hosted in Tashkent, and Samarkand along with 9 other Asian teams. Uzbekistan swept their group, outscoring their opponents 72–5, including a 17–0 win over Kuwait through one period, and 29-0 over Malaysia, still their largest ever victory. In the semi-finals, Uzbekistan won 12–0 against the United Arab Emirates, out shooting them 66–9, and went on to face Thailand. Uzbekistan defeated Thailand 2–1 in a competitive final to win their second straight IIHF Asian Oceanic U18 Championship.

In 2025, Uzbekistan Competed in the 2025 IIHF World U18 Championship Division III B. This was the first time Uzbekistan competed at the IIHF World Championships at any level. Uzbekistan continued their undefeated run going 5–0, with wins over: South Africa, Luxembourg, Turkmenistan, Bosnia and Herzegovina, and another close finale against Thailand, this time ending 3–2 for Uzbekistan after a go-ahead-goad by Jasurbek Rustamkhonov with 5:22 left in the 3rd period. Despite ageing out of the current roster, Rustamkhonov is still Uzbekistan's top scorer.

In 2026, Uzbekistan compeated in the 2025 IIHF World U18 Championship Division III A after previous promotion. Uzbekistan remained perfect, and was able to come up with victories against the hosts Hong Kong, New Zealand, Turkey, Bulgaria, and secured gold with a 6–3 over Israel. Despite earning gold and usually promotion, the reinstatement of Belarus keeps Uzbekistan in the 2027 Division III A.

Uzbekistan remains as one of the few undefeated teams in International Hockey.

== All-time record against other national teams ==
Last match update: 8 March 2026

Key
| Positive balance (more Wins) |
| Neutral balance (Wins = Losses) |
| Negative balance (more Losses) |

| Team | GP | W | L | GF | GA |
|---|---|---|---|---|---|
| Bosnia and Herzegovina | 1 | 1 | 0 | 11 | 3 |
| Bulgaria | 1 | 1 | 0 | 5 | 3 |
| Hong Kong | 1 | 1 | 0 | 6 | 2 |
| India | 1 | 1 | 0 | 15 | 1 |
| Indonesia | 1 | 1 | 0 | 13 | 0 |
| Iran | 2 | 2 | 0 | 33 | 1 |
| Israel | 1 | 1 | 0 | 6 | 3 |
| Kuwait (Note: Kuwait forfeited the game after the first period) | 1 | 1 | 0 | 17 | 0 |
| Kyrgyzstan | 2 | 2 | 0 | 7 | 4 |
| Luxembourg | 1 | 1 | 0 | 12 | 1 |
| Malaysia | 1 | 1 | 0 | 29 | 0 |
| Mongolia | 2 | 2 | 0 | 14 | 6 |
| New Zealand | 1 | 1 | 0 | 13 | 2 |
| South Africa | 1 | 1 | 0 | 12 | 0 |
| Thailand | 4 | 4 | 0 | 21 | 10 |
| Turkey | 1 | 1 | 0 | 7 | 6 |
| Turkmenistan | 2 | 2 | 0 | 13 | 2 |
| United Arab Emirates | 2 | 2 | 0 | 20 | 1 |
| Total | 26 | 26 | 0 | 233 | 45 |
