= 2025 IIHF World U18 Championship Division III =

2025 IIHF U18 World Championship Division III
Tournament details
- Host countries: Mexico; Thailand
- Venues: 2 (in 2 host cities)
- Dates: 2–8 March 2025 (A); 28 February – 6 March 2025 (B)
- Teams: 12

The 2025 IIHF U18 World Championship Division III consisted of two international under-18 ice hockey tournaments organized by the International Ice Hockey Federation. Divisions III A and III B represent the sixth and the seventh tier of the IIHF World U18 Championship.

== Division III A ==
2025 IIHF U18 World Championship Division III A

Tournament details
- Host country: Mexico
- City: Mexico City
- Venue: 1 (in 1 host city)
- Dates: 2–8 March 2025
- Teams: 6

Tournament statistics
- Games played: 15
- Goals scored: 154 (10.27 per game)
- Attendance: 6,909 (461 per game)
- Scoring leader: (Mexico) Nicolas Potts (19 points)

Official website
- www.iihf.com

The Division III Group A tournament was played in Mexico City, Mexico, from 2 to 8 March 2025.

=== Participating teams ===
Team	Qualification
Israel	Placed 6th in Division II B last year and were relegated
Mexico	Hosts; placed 2nd in Division III A last year
Turkey	Placed 3rd in Division III A last year
Iceland	Placed 4th in Division III A last year
New Zealand	Placed 5th in Division III A last year
Hong Kong	Placed 1st in Division III B last year and were promoted

=== Standings ===
Pos	Team	Pld	W	OTW	OTL	L	GF	GA	GD	Pts	Promotion or relegation
1	Mexico (H)	5	5	0	0	0	33	12	+21	15	Promoted to the 2026 Division II B
2	Turkey	5	3	0	0	2	25	24	+1	9	
3	Israel	5	2	1	0	2	31	27	+4	8	
4	Hong Kong	5	2	0	1	2	34	18	+16	7	
5	New Zealand	5	1	0	0	4	18	41	−23	3 (Note: Iceland 2–6 New Zealand)	
6	Iceland	5	1	0	0	4	13	32	−19	3	Relegated to the 2026 Division III B

Source: IIHF
Rules for classification: 1) points; 2) head-to-head points; 3) head-to-head goal difference; 4) head-to-head number of goals scored; 5) result against closest best-ranked team outside tied teams; 6) result against second-best ranked team outside tied teams; 7) seeding before tournament.
(H) Host

=== Match results ===
All times are local (Time in Mexico / Zona Centro – UTC-6).

2 March 2025; 13:00	Hong Kong	12–2 (2–1, 7–1, 3–0)	Iceland	Santa Fe Ice Rink, Mexico City; Attendance: 101

Game reference
12 min	Penalties	20 min
47	Shots	33

2 March 2025; 16:30	Turkey	7–5 (1–2, 5–2, 1–1)	Israel	Santa Fe Ice Rink, Mexico City; Attendance: 487

Game reference
6 min	Penalties	8 min
19	Shots	53

2 March 2025; 20:30	Mexico	10–2 (5–2, 3–0, 2–0)	New Zealand	Santa Fe Ice Rink, Mexico City; Attendance: 997

Game reference
10 min	Penalties	6 min
48	Shots	19

3 March 2025; 13:00	Israel	6–3 (4–0, 1–2, 1–1)	Iceland	Santa Fe Ice Rink, Mexico City; Attendance: 130

Game reference
14 min	Penalties	16 min
41	Shots	21

3 March 2025; 16:30	New Zealand	1–10 (0–4, 0–3, 1–3)	Hong Kong	Santa Fe Ice Rink, Mexico City; Attendance: 168

Game reference
14 min	Penalties	10 min
22	Shots	50

3 March 2025; 20:30	Mexico	8–1 (2–0, 3–1, 3–0)	Turkey	Santa Fe Ice Rink, Mexico City; Attendance: 720

Game reference
31 min	Penalties	8 min
42	Shots	19

5 March 2025; 13:30	Israel	9–5 (3–0, 3–1, 3–4)	New Zealand	Santa Fe Ice Rink, Mexico City; Attendance: 82

Game reference
10 min	Penalties	6 min
47	Shots	17

5 March 2025; 17:00	Turkey	3–4 (1–1, 0–0, 2–3)	Iceland	Santa Fe Ice Rink, Mexico City; Attendance: 131

Game reference
28 min	Penalties	14 min
37	Shots	52

5 March 2025; 20:30	Mexico	4–3 (2–1, 2–1, 0–1)	Hong Kong	Santa Fe Ice Rink, Mexico City; Attendance: 1,011

Game reference
12 min	Penalties	10 min
48	Shots	31

7 March 2025; 13:00	New Zealand	4–10 (2–2, 0–3, 2–5)	Turkey	Santa Fe Ice Rink, Mexico City; Attendance: 74

Game reference
6 min	Penalties	12 min
25	Shots	43

7 March 2025; 16:30	Hong Kong	6–7 OT (0–1, 4–2, 2–3) (OT: 0–1)	Israel	Santa Fe Ice Rink, Mexico City; Attendance: 350

Game reference
6 min	Penalties	6 min
26	Shots	35

7 March 2025; 20:30	Iceland	2–5 (1–2, 1–2, 0–1	Mexico	Santa Fe Ice Rink, Mexico City; Attendance: 1,070

Game reference
22 min	Penalties	20 min
25	Shots	28

8 March 2025; 13:00	Turkey	4–3 (1–0, 2–0, 1–3)	Hong Kong	Santa Fe Ice Rink, Mexico City; Attendance: 77

Game reference
12 min	Penalties	10 min
31	Shots	29

8 March 2025; 16:30	Iceland	2–6 (1–2, 1–2, 0–2)	New Zealand	Santa Fe Ice Rink, Mexico City; Attendance: 215

Game reference
8 min	Penalties	2 min
34	Shots	21

8 March 2025; 20:30	Israel	4–6 (0–1, 2–3, 2–2)	Mexico	Santa Fe Ice Rink, Mexico City; Attendance: 1,296

Game reference
32 min	Penalties	14 min
48	Shots	23

== Division III B ==
2025 IIHF U18 World Championship Division III B

Tournament details
- Host country: Thailand
- City: Bangkok
- Venue: 1 (in 1 host city)
- Dates: 28 February – 6 March 2025
- Teams: 6

Tournament statistics
- Games played: 15
- Goals scored: 166 (11.07 per game)
- Attendance: 5,105 (340 per game)
- Scoring leader: (Turkmenistan) Sultanhamit Vahitov (24 points)

Official website
- www.iihf.com

The Division III Group B tournament was played in Bangkok, Thailand, from 28 February to 6 March 2025.

=== Participating teams ===
Team	Qualification
Bosnia and Herzegovina	Placed 6th in Division III A last year and were relegated
Turkmenistan	Placed 2nd in Division III B last year
Thailand	Hosts; placed 3rd in Division III B last year
South Africa	Placed 4th in Division III B last year
Luxembourg	First participation in World Championship since 2023
Uzbekistan	First participation in World Championship

=== Standings ===
Pos	Team	Pld	W	OTW	OTL	L	GF	GA	GD	Pts	Promotion
1	Uzbekistan	5	5	0	0	0	46	8	+38	15	Promoted to the 2026 Division III A
2	Thailand (H)	5	4	0	0	1	40	6	+34	12	
3	Turkmenistan	5	3	0	0	2	36	23	+13	9	
4	Bosnia and Herzegovina	5	1	1	0	3	14	39	−25	5	
5	South Africa	5	1	0	0	4	18	47	−29	3	
6	Luxembourg	5	0	0	1	4	12	43	−31	1	

Source: IIHF
Rules for classification: 1) points; 2) head-to-head points; 3) head-to-head goal difference; 4) head-to-head number of goals scored; 5) result against closest best-ranked team outside tied teams; 6) result against second-best ranked team outside tied teams; 7) seeding before tournament.
(H) Host

=== Match results ===
All times are local (Time in Thailand – UTC+7).

28 February 2025; 13:00	Thailand	16–0 (4–0, 5–0, 7–0)	Bosnia and Herzegovina	Thailand International Ice Hockey Arena, Bangkok; Attendance: 525

Game reference
10 min	Penalties	41 min
60	Shots	13

28 February 2025; 16:30	Uzbekistan	12–0 (4–0, 6–0, 2–0)	South Africa	Thailand International Ice Hockey Arena, Bangkok; Attendance: 175

Game reference
29 min	Penalties	14 min
44	Shots	8

28 February 2025; 20:00	Turkmenistan	8–2 (1–0, 3–2, 4–0)	Luxembourg	Thailand International Ice Hockey Arena, Bangkok; Attendance: 155

Game reference
33 min	Penalties	14 min
34	Shots	37

1 March 2025; 13:00	Bosnia and Herzegovina	4–3 (0–1, 3–1, 1–1)	South Africa	Thailand International Ice Hockey Arena, Bangkok; Attendance: 210

Game reference
12 min	Penalties	14 min
43	Shots	28

1 March 2025; 16:30	Luxembourg	1–12 (1–7, 0–2, 0–3)	Uzbekistan	Thailand International Ice Hockey Arena, Bangkok; Attendance: 250

Game reference
4 min	Penalties	6 min
9	Shots	41

1 March 2025; 20:00	Turkmenistan	3–4 (1–0, 0–3, 2–1)	Thailand	Thailand International Ice Hockey Arena, Bangkok; Attendance: 550

Game reference
35 min	Penalties	31 min
28	Shots	53

3 March 2025; 13:00	Bosnia and Herzegovina	5–4 GWS (0–1, 3–1, 1–2) (OT: 0–0) (SO: 1–0)	Luxembourg	Thailand International Ice Hockey Arena, Bangkok; Attendance: 155

Game reference
4 min	Penalties	22 min
29	Shots	31

3 March 2025; 16:30	Turkmenistan	2–8 (2–4, 0–3, 0–1)	Uzbekistan	Thailand International Ice Hockey Arena, Bangkok; Attendance: 325

Game reference
6 min	Penalties	8 min
23	Shots	29

3 March 2025; 20:00	Thailand	8–0 (4–0, 1–0, 3–0)	South Africa	Thailand International Ice Hockey Arena, Bangkok; Attendance: 425

Game reference
8 min	Penalties	12 min
67	Shots	9

4 March 2025; 13:00	Uzbekistan	11–3 (2–1, 4–1, 5–1)	Bosnia and Herzegovina	Thailand International Ice Hockey Arena, Bangkok; Attendance: 250

Game reference
6 min	Penalties	8 min
53	Shots	10

4 March 2025; 16:30	South Africa	7–18 (3–5, 1–3, 3–10)	Turkmenistan	Thailand International Ice Hockey Arena, Bangkok; Attendance: 315

Game reference
16 min	Penalties	6 min
29	Shots	64

4 March 2025; 20:00	Luxembourg	0–10 (0–5, 0–2, 0–3)	Thailand	Thailand International Ice Hockey Arena, Bangkok; Attendance: 430

Game reference
20 min	Penalties	4 min
17	Shots	58

6 March 2025; 13:00	South Africa	8–5 (2–3, 2–2, 4–0)	Luxembourg	Thailand International Ice Hockey Arena, Bangkok; Attendance: 295

Game reference
12 min	Penalties	10 min
35	Shots	47

6 March 2025; 16:30	Bosnia and Herzegovina	2–5 (1–1, 1–0, 0–4)	Turkmenistan	Thailand International Ice Hockey Arena, Bangkok; Attendance: 390

Game reference
37 min	Penalties	10 min
36	Shots	43

6 March 2025; 20:00	Thailand	2–3 (1–1, 1–1, 0–1)	Uzbekistan	Thailand International Ice Hockey Arena, Bangkok; Attendance: 655

Game reference
8 min	Penalties	4 min
25	Shots	43
