= 2024 IIHF U18 Asia and Oceania Championship =

Tournament details
- Host country: Uzbekistan
- Venues: 2 (in 2 host cities)
- Dates: 23–30 April 2024
- Teams: 10

Final positions
- Champions: Uzbekistan (2nd title)
- Runners-up: Thailand
- Third place: Mongolia
- Fourth place: United Arab Emirates

Tournament statistics
- Scoring leader: (Mongolia) Davaanyamyn Lkhagvadorj (36 points)

Official website
- www.iihf.com

The 2024 IIHF U18 Asia and Oceania Championship was an international men's under-18 ice hockey tournament organized by the International Ice Hockey Federation (IIHF). The tournament took place from 23 to 30 April 2024 in Tashkent and Samarkand, Uzbekistan. It was the third under-18 edition of the event.

== Venues ==
Group A and Final Round	Group B
Humo Arena, Tashkent	Ice Rink Arena, Samarkand
Capacity: 12,500	Capacity: 1,800

== Preliminary round ==
All times are local (Uzbekistan Time – UTC+5).

=== Group A ===
Pos	Team	Pld	W	OTW	OTL	L	GF	GA	GD	Pts	Qualification
1	Uzbekistan (H)	4	4	0	0	0	72	5	+67	12	Semifinals
2	Thailand	4	3	0	0	1	118	7	+111	9	Semifinals
3	Iran	4	2	0	0	2	36	43	−7	6	Fifth place game
4	Malaysia	4	1	0	0	3	17	75	−58	3	Seventh place game
5	Kuwait	4	0	0	0	4	3	116	−113	0	Ninth place game

Source: IIHF
(H) Host

23 April 2024; 16:00	Kuwait	0–57 (0–17, 0–28, 0–12)	Thailand	Humo Arena, Tashkent; Attendance: 158

Game reference
10 min	Penalties	2 min
1	Shots	122

23 April 2024; 19:30	Iran	0–19 (0–5, 0–7, 0–7)	Uzbekistan	Humo Arena, Tashkent; Attendance: 1,500

Game reference
39 min	Penalties	45 min
8	Shots	79

24 April 2024; 19:30	Malaysia	17–2 (9–1, 5–1, 3–0)	Kuwait	Humo Arena, Tashkent; Attendance: 232

Game reference
12 min	Penalties	14 min
55	Shots	16

25 April 2024; 16:00	Thailand	23–0 (12–0, 6–0, 5–0)	Iran	Humo Arena, Tashkent; Attendance: 100

Game reference
2 min	Penalties	16 min
121	Shots	5

25 April 2024; 19:30	Uzbekistan	29–0 (9–0, 15–0, 5–0)	Malaysia	Humo Arena, Tashkent; Attendance: 330

Game reference
2 min	Penalties	4 min
96	Shots	3

26 April 2024; 19:30	Iran	25–1 (10–1, 7–0, 8–0)	Kuwait	Humo Arena, Tashkent; Attendance: 102

Game reference
14 min	Penalties	14 min
80	Shots	4

27 April 2024; 16:00	Kuwait	0–17 (forfeit)	Uzbekistan	Humo Arena, Tashkent

Game reference
2 min	Penalties	2 min
0	Shots	36

Kuwait forfeited the game after the 1st period

27 April 2024; 19:30	Thailand	33–0 (11–0, 10–0, 12–0)	Malaysia	Humo Arena, Tashkent; Attendance: 80

Game reference
12 min	Penalties	6 min
124	Shots	7

28 April 2024; 16:00	Uzbekistan	7–5 (3–1, 1–2, 3–2)	Thailand	Humo Arena, Tashkent

28 April 2024; 19:30	Malaysia	0–11 (0–5, 0–5, 0–1)	Iran	Humo Arena, Tashkent; Attendance: 103

Game reference
12 min	Penalties	8 min
11	Shots	43

=== Group B ===
Pos	Team	Pld	W	OTW	OTL	L	GF	GA	GD	Pts	Qualification
1	Mongolia	4	4	0	0	0	90	7	+83	12	Semifinals
2	United Arab Emirates	4	3	0	0	1	51	14	+37	9	Semifinals
3	India	4	2	0	0	2	7	53	−46	6	Fifth place game
4	Macau	4	1	0	0	3	5	71	−66	3	Seventh place game
5	Indonesia (Note: Team Indonesia forfeited all their games due to using ineligible players during the competition.)	4	0	0	0	4	4	12	−8	0	Ninth place game

Source: IIHF

23 April 2024; 16:00	Indonesia	0–1 (forfeit)	United Arab Emirates	Ice Rink, Samarkand

Indonesia had initially won 5–4 in overtime

23 April 2024; 19:30	India	0–32 (0–10, 0–9, 0–13)	Mongolia	Ice Rink, Samarkand

Game reference

24 April 2024; 19:30	Macau	1–0 (forfeit)	Indonesia	Ice Rink, Samarkand

Indonesia had initially won 19–0

25 April 2024; 16:00	United Arab Emirates	18–1 (7–0, 5–0, 6–1)	India	Ice Rink, Samarkand; Attendance: 150

Game reference
8 min	Penalties	12 min
64	Shots	6

25 April 2024; 19:30	Mongolia	37–0 (13–0, 12–0, 12–0)	Macau	Ice Rink, Samarkand; Attendance: 70

Game reference
6 min	Penalties	2 min
75	Shots	5

26 April 2024; 19:30	Indonesia	4–9 (forfeit) (2–3, 1–3, 1–3)	Mongolia	Ice Rink, Samarkand; Attendance: 250

Game reference
16 min	Penalties	2 min
16	Shots	62

27 April 2024; 14:00	United Arab Emirates	29–1 (9–0, 8–0, 12–1)	Macau	Ice Rink, Samarkand; Attendance: 150

Game reference
13 min	Penalties	6 min
74	Shots	11

27 April 2024; 17:30	India	1–0 (forfeit)	Indonesia	Ice Rink, Samarkand

Indonesia had initially won 14–2

28 April 2024; 11:00	Mongolia	12–3 (7–3, 1–0, 4–0)	United Arab Emirates	Ice Rink, Samarkand; Attendance: 300

Game reference
33 min	Penalties	37 min
42	Shots	20

28 April 2024; 14:30	Macau	3–5 (0–3, 2–1, 1–1)	India	Ice Rink, Samarkand; Attendance: 333

Game reference
4 min	Penalties	10 min
32	Shots	24

== Final round ==
=== Bracket ===
Semifinals
29 April
Uzbekistan	12
United Arab Emirates	0
29 April
Mongolia	4
Thailand	7

Final
30 April
Uzbekistan	2
Thailand	1
Third place game
30 April
Mongolia	4
United Arab Emirates	2

=== Semifinals ===
29 April 2024; 16:00	Uzbekistan	12–0 (4–0, 6–0, 2–0)	United Arab Emirates	Humo Arena, Tashkent; Attendance: 300

Game reference
6 min	Penalties	12 min
66	Shots	9

29 April 2024; 19:30	Mongolia	4–7 (0–1, 1–4, 3–2)	Thailand	Humo Arena, Tashkent; Attendance: 50

Game reference
12 min	Penalties	14 min
37	Shots	41

=== Ninth place game ===
29 April 2024; 12:30	Kuwait	1–0 (forfeit)	Indonesia	Humo Arena, Tashkent

=== Seventh place game ===
30 April 2024; 09:00	Malaysia	8–6 (2–2, 3–2, 3–2)	Macau	Humo Arena, Tashkent; Attendance: 100

Game reference
12 min	Penalties	10 min
39	Shots	30

=== Fifth place game ===
30 April 2024; 12:30	Iran	14–2 (6–0, 5–1, 3–1)	India	Humo Arena, Tashkent; Attendance: 87

Game reference
2 min	Penalties	8 min
65	Shots	17

=== Third place game ===
30 April 2024; 16:00	Mongolia	4–2 (2–0, 2–1, 0–1)	United Arab Emirates	Humo Arena, Tashkent; Attendance: 80

Game reference
10 min	Penalties	10 min
38	Shots	26

=== Final ===
30 April 2024; 19:30	Uzbekistan	2–1 (0–1, 1–0, 1–0)	Thailand	Humo Arena, Tashkent; Attendance: 1,550

Game reference
10 min	Penalties	14 min
36	Shots	28

== Final standings ==
The final standings of the tournament according to IIHF:

Pos	Team
1	Uzbekistan
2	Thailand
3	Mongolia
4	United Arab Emirates
5	Iran
6	India
7	Malaysia
8	Macau
9	Kuwait
10	Indonesia

== Ranking ==
Rank	Team	M	W	D	L	GF	GA	GD	Points
1	Uzbekistan	6	6	0	0	86	6	+80	18
2	Thailand	6	4	0	2	126	13	+113	12
3	Mongolia	6	5	0	1	98	16	+82	15
4	United Arab Emirates	6	3	0	3	53	30	+23	9
5	Iran	5	3	0	2	50	45	+5	9
6	India	5	2	0	3	9	67	-58	6
7	Malaysia	5	2	0	3	25	81	-56	6
8	Macau	5	1	0	4	11	79	-68	3
8	Kuwait	5	1	0	4	4	116	-112	3
8	Indonesia	5	0	0	5	4	13	-9	0

- Kuwait forfeited the game with Uzbekistan after the 1st period.
- Team Indonesia forfeited all their games due to using ineligible players during the competition after 3 wins and 1 loss.
