= 2007–08 Armenian Hockey League season =

Armenian ice hockey league season

The 2007–08 Armenian Hockey League season was the seventh season of the Armenian Hockey League, the top level of ice hockey in Armenia. Five teams participated in the league, and Urartu Yerevan won the championship.

== Standings ==
	Club
1.	Urartu Yerevan
2.	Dinamo Yerevan
3.	SCA Yerevan
4.	Shengavit Yerevan
5.	Shirak Gyumri
