= 2026 IIHF World U18 Championship Division III =

2026 IIHF U18 World Championship Division III
Tournament details
- Host countries: Hong Kong; Bosnia and Herzegovina
- Venues: 2 (in 2 host cities)
- Dates: 2–8 March 2026 (A); 13–19 February 2026 (B)
- Teams: 12

The 2026 IIHF U18 World Championship Division III consisted of two international under-18 ice hockey tournaments organized by the International Ice Hockey Federation. Divisions III A and III B represent the sixth and the seventh tier of the IIHF World U18 Championship.

== Division III A ==
2025 IIHF U18 World Championship Division III A

Tournament details
- Host country: Hong Kong
- City: Hong Kong
- Venue: 1 (in 1 host city)
- Dates: 2–8 March 2026
- Teams: 6

Tournament statistics
- Games played: 15
- Goals scored: 152 (10.13 per game)
- Attendance: 4,650 (310 per game)
- Scoring leader: (Turkey) Emin İnandı (20 points)

Official website
- www.iihf.com

The Division III Group A tournament will be played in Hong Kong, China, from 2 to 8 March 2026.

=== Participating teams ===
Team	Qualification
Bulgaria	Placed 6th in Division II B last year and were relegated
Turkey	Placed 2nd in Division III A last year
Israel	Placed 3rd in Division III A last year
Hong Kong	Hosts; placed 4th in Division III A last year
New Zealand	Placed 5th in Division III A last year
Uzbekistan	Placed 1st in Division III B last year and were promoted

=== Standings ===
Pos	Team	Pld	W	OTW	OTL	L	GF	GA	GD	Pts	Promotion or relegation
1	Uzbekistan	5	4	1	0	0	37	16	+21	14	
2	Hong Kong (H)	5	4	0	0	1	33	14	+19	12	
3	Israel	5	3	0	0	2	30	23	+7	9	
4	Turkey	5	2	0	1	2	29	25	+4	7	
5	Bulgaria	5	1	0	0	4	15	32	−17	3	
6	New Zealand	5	0	0	0	5	8	42	−34	0	Relegation to the 2027 Division III B

Source: IIHF
Rules for classification: 1) points; 2) head-to-head points; 3) head-to-head goal difference; 4) head-to-head number of goals scored; 5) result against closest best-ranked team outside tied teams; 6) result against second-best ranked team outside tied teams; 7) seeding before tournament.
(H) Host

=== Match results ===
All times are local (Hong Kong Time; UTC+8).

2 March 2026; 13:00	Israel	9–5 (2–1, 1–2, 6–2)	Bulgaria	DB Ice Rink; Attendance: 225

Game reference
4 min	Penalties	8 min
51	Shots	22

2 March 2026; 16:30	Turkey	10–2 (2–2, 4–0, 4–0)	New Zealand	DB Ice Rink; Attendance: 245

Game reference
14 min	Penalties	12 min
51	Shots	28

2 March 2026; 20:30	Uzbekistan	6–2 (2–1, 2–1, 2–0)	Hong Kong	DB Ice Rink; Attendance: 450

Game reference
8 min	Penalties	12 min
37	Shots	34

3 March 2026; 13:00	Turkey	5–6 (2–1, 2–1, 1–4)	Israel	DB Ice Rink; Attendance: 175

Game reference
8 min	Penalties	10 min
32	Shots	49

3 March 2026; 16:30	New Zealand	2–13 (1–5, 0–4, 1–4)	Uzbekistan	DB Ice Rink; Attendance: 230

Game reference
10 min	Penalties	8 min
19	Shots	65

3 March 2026; 20:30	Bulgaria	0–11 (0–3, 0–2, 0–6)	Hong Kong	DB Ice Rink; Attendance: 450

Game reference
4 min	Penalties	4 min
17	Shots	65

5 March 2026; 13:00	Bulgaria	5–3 (0–1, 3–1, 2–1)	New Zealand	DB Ice Rink; Attendance: 125

Game reference
2 min	Penalties	8 min
54	Shots	23

5 March 2026; 16:30	Turkey	6–7 OT (2–2, 1–4, 3–0) (OT: 0–1)	Uzbekistan	DB Ice Rink; Attendance: 270

Game reference
33 min	Penalties	12 min
45	Shots	36

5 March 2026; 20:30	Israel	4–6 (0–2, 1–3, 3–1)	Hong Kong	DB Ice Rink; Attendance: 475

Game reference
12 min	Penalties	47 min
61	Shots	47

6 March 2026; 13:00	Uzbekistan	5–3 (3–0, 1–2, 1–1)	Bulgaria	DB Ice Rink; Attendance: 130

Game reference
4 min	Penalties	8 min
41	Shots	15

6 March 2026; 16:30	New Zealand	1–8 (0–6, 1–0, 0–2)	Israel	DB Ice Rink; Attendance: 190

Game reference
2 min	Penalties	0 min
23	Shots	60

6 March 2026; 20:30	Hong Kong	8–4 (2–2, 4–2, 2–0)	Turkey	DB Ice Rink; Attendance: 500

Game reference
8 min	Penalties	6 min
47	Shots	39

8 March 2026; 13:00	Israel	3–6 (1–1, 1–4, 1–1)	Uzbekistan	DB Ice Rink; Attendance: 350

Game reference
6 min	Penalties	10 min
50	Shots	47

8 March 2026; 16:30	Bulgaria	2–4 (1–2, 1–1, 0–1)	Turkey	DB Ice Rink; Attendance: 235

Game reference
6 min	Penalties	10 min
34	Shots	42

8 March 2026; 20:30	Hong Kong	6–0 (1–0, 4–0, 1–0)	New Zealand	DB Ice Rink; Attendance: 600

Game reference
6 min	Penalties	8 min
77	Shots	15

== Division III B ==
2026 IIHF U18 World Championship Division III B

Tournament details
- Host country: Bosnia and Herzegovina
- City: Sarajevo
- Venue: 1 (in 1 host city)
- Dates: 13–19 February 2026
- Teams: 6

Tournament statistics
- Games played: 15
- Goals scored: 135 (9 per game)
- Attendance: 1,570 (105 per game)
- Scoring leader: (Thailand) Theetachthan Luang-On (16 points)

Official website
- www.iihf.com

The Division III Group B tournament was played in Sarajevo, Bosnia and Herzegovina, from 13 to 19 February 2026.

This tournament was played under a new format. The teams were divided into two groups of three using the serpentine system. In the group stage, each team from Group A faced all three opponents from Group B, and vice versa. The top two teams from each group advanced to the semifinals, which were played as A1 vs. A2, and B1 vs. B2.

=== Participating teams ===
Team	Qualification
Iceland	Placed 6th in Division III A last year and were relegated
Thailand	Placed 2nd in Division III B last year
Turkmenistan	Placed 3rd in Division III B last year
Bosnia and Herzegovina	Hosts; placed 4th in Division III B last year
South Africa	Placed 5th in Division III B last year
Luxembourg	placed 6th in Division III B last year

=== Group stage ===
==== Group A ====
Pos	Team	Pld	W	OTW	OTL	L	GF	GA	GD	Pts	Qualification
1	Iceland	3	2	0	0	1	19	6	+13	6	Semifinals
2	Bosnia and Herzegovina (H)	3	1	1	0	1	13	18	−5	5	Semifinals
3	South Africa	3	1	0	0	2	12	11	+1	3	Relegation round

Source: IIHF
Rules for classification: 1) points; 2) goal difference; 3) total goals; 4) seeding before tournament.
(H) Host

==== Group B ====
Pos	Team	Pld	W	OTW	OTL	L	GF	GA	GD	Pts	Qualification
1	Thailand	3	3	0	0	0	20	7	+13	9	Semifinals
2	Turkmenistan	3	1	0	0	2	5	11	−6	3	Semifinals
3	Luxembourg	3	0	0	1	2	10	26	−16	1	Relegation round

Source: IIHF
Rules for classification: 1) points; 2) goal difference; 3) total goals; 4) seeding before tournament.

==== Match results ====
All times are local (Central European Time; UTC+1).

13 February 2026; 12:30	South Africa	3–4 (1–1, 1–2, 1–1)	Turkmenistan	Skenderija Sports Arena; Attendance: 50

Game reference
72 min	Penalties	8 min
33	Shots	32

13 February 2026; 16:00	Luxembourg	1–12 (0–2, 0–4, 1–6)	Iceland	Skenderija Sports Arena; Attendance: 50

Game reference
33 min	Penalties	30 min
8	Shots	61

13 February 2026; 19:30	Bosnia and Herzegovina	3–12 (0–4, 2–2, 1–6)	Thailand	Skenderija Sports Arena; Attendance: 250

Game reference
16 min	Penalties	18 min
25	Shots	36

14 February 2026; 12:30	Iceland	5–1 (3–0, 2–1, 0–0)	Turkmenistan	Skenderija Sports Arena; Attendance: 50

Game reference
12 min	Penalties	18 min
55	Shots	21

14 February 2026; 16:00	Thailand	4–2 (2–0, 1–1, 1–1)	South Africa	Skenderija Sports Arena; Attendance: 50

Game reference
4 min	Penalties	14 min
43	Shots	19

14 February 2026; 19:30	Bosnia and Herzegovina	7–6 OT (5–0, 0–3, 1–3) (OT: 1–0)	Luxembourg	Skenderija Sports Arena; Attendance: 300

Game reference
10 min	Penalties	8 min
33	Shots	33

16 February 2026; 12:30	South Africa	7–3 (1–2, 2–0, 4–1)	Luxembourg	Skenderija Sports Arena; Attendance: 30

Game reference
12 min	Penalties	14 min
39	Shots	19

16 February 2026; 16:00	Iceland	2–4 (1–1, 0–1, 1–2)	Thailand	Skenderija Sports Arena; Attendance: 30

Game reference
37 min	Penalties	10 min
32	Shots	25

16 February 2026; 19:30	Turkmenistan	0–3 (0–0, 0–1, 0–2)	Bosnia and Herzegovina	Skenderija Sports Arena

Game reference
8 min	Penalties	6 min
21	Shots	49

=== Playoffs ===
==== Brackets ====
Semifinals
B1	Thailand	14
B2	Turkmenistan	0
A1	Iceland	8
A2	Bosnia and Herzegovina	2

Final
Thailand (OT)	4
Iceland	3
Third place game
Bosnia and Herzegovina	4
Turkmenistan	1

Relegation round
A3	South Africa	2	9	1
B3	Luxembourg	6	2	0

==== Relegation round ====
18 February 2026; 12:30	South Africa	2–6 (1–2, 0–3, 1–1)	Luxembourg	Skenderija Sports Arena; Attendance: 30

Game reference
12 min	Penalties	14 min
33	Shots	34

19 February 2026; 12:30	Luxembourg	2–9 (0–4, 1–1, 1–4)	South Africa	Skenderija Sports Arena; Attendance: 30

Game reference
4 min	Penalties	14 min
31	Shots	41

An extra overtime period was played following the conclusion of the game since both teams had won one game each. Latita Ngqola scored at 4:59 to win the relegation round for South Africa.

==== Semifinals ====
18 February 2026; 16:00	Thailand	14–0 (5–0, 5–0, 4–0)	Turkmenistan	Skenderija Sports Arena; Attendance: 30

Game reference
6 min	Penalties	16 min
58	Shots	12

18 February 2026; 19:30	Iceland	8–2 (3–2, 3–0, 2–0)	Bosnia and Herzegovina	Skenderija Sports Arena; Attendance: 200

Game reference
20 min	Penalties	10 min
45	Shots	23

==== Third place game ====
19 February 2026; 16:00	Bosnia and Herzegovina	4–1 (1–0, 3–0, 0–1)	Turkmenistan	Skenderija Sports Arena; Attendance: 100

Game reference
10 min	Penalties	20 min
28	Shots	25

==== Final ====
19 February 2026; 19:30	Thailand	4–3 OT (1–1, 0–1, 2–1) (OT: 1–0)	Iceland	Skenderija Sports Arena; Attendance: 70

Game reference
6 min	Penalties	10 min
27	Shots	36

Source: Match schedule

=== Final standings ===
Pos	Team	Pld	W	OTW	OTL	L	GF	GA	GD	Pts	Promotion or relegation
1	Thailand	5	4	1	0	0	38	10	+28	14	First place
2	Iceland	5	3	0	1	1	30	12	+18	10	Second place
3	Bosnia and Herzegovina	5	2	1	0	2	19	27	−8	8	Third place
4	Turkmenistan	5	1	0	0	4	6	29	−23	3	Fourth place
5	South Africa	5	2	0	0	3	24	19	+5	6	Fifth place
6	Luxembourg	5	1	0	1	3	18	38	−20	4	Sixth place, possible relegation

Source: IIHF
