= 2008–09 Armenian Hockey League season =

Hockey season in Armenia

The 2008–09 Armenian Hockey League season was the eighth season of the Armenian Hockey League, the top level of ice hockey in Armenia. Five teams participated in the league, and Urartu Yerevan won the championship.

== Regular season ==
	Club	GP	W	T	L	Goals	Pts
1.	Urartu Yerevan	16	14	0	2	104-27	42
2.	Dinamo Yerevan	16	13	0	3	86-40	39
3.	Shirak Gyumri	16	8	0	8	59-51	24
4.	SCA Yerevan	16	5	0	11	37-63	15
5.	Shengavit Yerevan	16	0	0	16	13-118	0

== Final ==
- Urartu Yerevan - Dinamo Yerevan (5-3, 6–2, 4–3)
