= 2000–01 Armenian Hockey League season =

Armenian ice hockey league season

The 2000–01 Armenian Hockey League season was the first season of the Armenian Hockey League, the top level of ice hockey in Armenia. Three teams participated in the league, and ASC Yerevan won the championship.

== Regular season ==
	Club	Pts
1.	ASC Yerevan	16
2.	Shengavit Yerevan	7
3.	Dinamo Yerevan	1

== Final ==
ASC Yerevan - Shengavit Yerevan (5-3, 3-1, 4-2)
