= International Armenian Ball Hockey Association =

Sports organization of Armenia

International Armenian Ball Hockey Association logo

The International Armenian Ball Hockey Association (IABHA) (Armenian: Գնդակով հոկեյի հայկական միջազգային ասոցիացիա, romanized: Gndakov hokeyi haykakan mijazgayin asots’iats’ia), is the regulating body of ball hockey in Armenia. The IABHA is registered as an international nonprofit organization and organizes Armenia's participation in international ball hockey events. The association accepts members from across the Armenian diaspora.

== History ==
The International Armenian Ball Hockey Association was established in 2012 and is currently governed by a board of directors. The IABHA is a full member of the International Street and Ball Hockey Federation. As of 2023, the IABHA has participated in five World Championships, and one Caribbean Championship. The association manages the Armenia men's national ball hockey team and conducts training programs. The head coach is Gabi Missakian.

== See also ==
- Armenian Hockey League
- Ice Hockey Federation of Armenia
- Ice hockey in Armenia
- Sport in Armenia
