= 2003–04 Armenian Hockey League season =

Armenian ice hockey league season

The 2003–04 Armenian Hockey League season was the third season of the Armenian Hockey League, the top level of ice hockey in Armenia. Four teams participated in the league, and Dinamo Yerevan won the championship.

== Standings ==
	Club
1.	Dinamo Yerevan
2.	BMA Yerevan
3.	Shengavit Yerevan
4.	Shirak Gyumri
