= 2025 IIHF World Championship Division IV =

Ice hockey world championships

Tournament details
- Host country: Armenia
- City: Yerevan
- Venue: 1 (in 1 host city)
- Dates: 13–19 April
- Teams: 6

Tournament statistics
- Games played: 15
- Goals scored: 231 (15.4 per game)
- Attendance: 3,380 (225 per game)
- Scoring leader: (Kuwait) Ilia Drozdetskikh (36 points)

Official website
- IIHF

The 2025 IIHF World Championship Division IV was an international ice hockey tournament run by the International Ice Hockey Federation.

The tournament was held in Yerevan, Armenia, from 13 to 19 to April 2025.

Uzbekistan won Division IV and was promoted to Division III.

== Participating teams ==
Team	Qualification
Iran	Placed 6th in Division III B in 2024 and was relegated.
Kuwait	Placed 2nd in Division IV in 2024.
Indonesia	Placed 3rd in Division IV in 2024.
Malaysia	Placed 4th in Division IV in 2024.
Armenia	Host, first participation since 2010.
Uzbekistan	First time participating.

== Match officials ==
Five referees and seven linesmen were selected for the tournament.

Referees	Linesmen
(Iran) Ramin Atighechi; (Japan) Kenji Kosaka; (Kazakhstan) Vladimir Yefremov; (Slovakia) Juraj Konc; (United Arab Emirates) Yahya Al-Jneibi	(Czech Republic) Vít Lederer; (Germany) Tom Giesen; (Hong Kong) Wong Chun Hang; (Indonesia) Andianto Hie; (Kazakhstan) Vladislav Zotov; (Malaysia) Edmond Ng; (Uzbekistan) David Prokofyev

== Standings ==
Pos	Team	Pld	W	OTW	OTL	L	GF	GA	GD	Pts	Promotion
1	Uzbekistan	5	4	0	1	0	79	10	+69	13	Promoted to the 2026 Division III B
2	Armenia (H)	5	3	1	1	0	53	11	+42	12	
3	Kuwait	5	3	1	0	1	56	32	+24	11	
4	Indonesia	5	2	0	0	3	17	60	−43	6	
5	Iran	5	1	0	0	4	6	42	−36	3	
6	Malaysia	5	0	0	0	5	20	76	−56	0	

Source: IIHF
Rules for classification: 1) points; 2) head-to-head points; 3) head-to-head goal difference; 4) head-to-head number of goals scored; 5) result against closest best-ranked team outside tied teams; 6) result against second-best ranked team outside tied teams; 7) seeding before tournament.
(H) Host

== Results ==
All times are local (UTC+4).

13 April 2025; 14:00	Indonesia	2–1 (1–0, 0–1, 1–0)	Iran	Ice Arena, Yerevan; Attendance: 211

Game reference

Izzan Rais
Goalies
Soheil Khalaj
Referee:
(Japan) Kenji Kosaka
Linesmen:
(Germany) Tom Giesen
(Hong Kong) Chun Hang Wong

Naga (Siregar) – 17:40	1–0
	1–1	24:55 – Farsad (Ghafoori, Mahdiyoun) (PP)
Wijaya (Prijanto, Siregar) (PP) – 44:04	2–1

4 min
Penalties
11 min
28
Shots
44

13 April 2025; 17:00	Kuwait	3–13 (0–4, 2–5, 1–4)	Uzbekistan	Ice Arena, Yerevan; Attendance: 233

Game reference

Rustam Irgashev
Goalies
Adam Barvik
Referee:
(Iran) Ramin Atighechi
Linesmen:
(Czech Republic) Vít Lederer
(Malaysia) Edmond Ng

	0–1	02:40 – Kravchenko (Maltsev, Jilov)
	0–2	05:16 – Kravchenko (Jilov, Maltsev)
	0–3	06:39 – Nazarevich (Kogan)
	0–4	16:11 – Kravchenko (Jilov) (PP2)
Budzevich (Drozdetskikh) – 22:56	1–4
	1–5	24:25 – Sinyavskiy (Jilov, Bagautdinov)
	1–6	27:02 – Azimov (Golubovich)
	1–7	28:28 – Rustamkhonov (Nazarevich)
Drozdetskikh (Budzevich) – 31:16	2–7
	2–8	34:08 – Maltsev (Dorofeev, Kravchenko) (PP)
	2–9	37:26 – Azimov (Maltsev)
	2–10	41:38 – Rasulov (Dorofeev)
	2–11	47:29 – Maltsev (Azimov)
	2–12	49:35 – Kogan (Kravchenko, Jilov)
Drozdetskikh (Al Mari, Tcibin) – 50:10	3–12
	3–13	50:29 – Azimov (Golubovich)

12 min
Penalties
6 min
22
Shots
81

13 April 2025; 20:00	Armenia	24–3 (9–1, 4–1, 11–1)	Malaysia	Ice Arena, Yerevan; Attendance: 462

Game reference

Artem Putulian
Dmitriy Mazanko
Goalies
Mathaeus Grason Yu
Muhammad Haikal
Referee:
(Slovakia) Juraj Konč
Linesmen:
(Indonesia) Andianto Hie
(Kazakhstan) Vladislav Zotov

Asatrian – 00:53	1–0
A. Kuznetsov (Manukian, Davtian) – 02:09	2–0
M. Kuznetsov (A. Kuznetsov, Manukian) – 04:43	3–0
Malakyan (Mikayelyan, Gevorgyan) – 05:04	4–0
M. Kuznetsov (Manukian) (PP) – 06:50	5–0
	5–1	07:46 – Azra (Fadzli, K. Amin)
M. Kuznetsov (Manukian, Malakyan) – 09:35	6–1
A. Kuznetsov (M. Kuznetsov, Davtian) (PP) – 14:56	7–1
Kovalenko (Saghatelian, Malakyan) – 17:14	8–1
A. Kuznetsov (Krivykh) – 18:27	9–1
Ambartsumian – 22:38	10–1
Ambartsumian (SH) – 26:07	11–1
Manukian (Khudiakov, Davtian) – 35:53	12–1
	12–2	37:20 – Azra
Manukian (M. Kuznetsov, A. Kuznetsov) (SH) – 39:39	13–2
A. Kuznetsov (Khudiakov, M. Kuznetsov) (SH) – 40:15	14–2
Manukian (M. Kuznetsov) (SH) – 41:06	15–2
Kovalenko (Asatrian, Saghatelian) – 41:55	16–2
A. Kuznetsov (Khudiakov) – 42:57	17–2
Saghatelian (Ivanov) – 43:19	18–2
Manukian (Khudiakov) – 44:45	19–2
	19–3	45:12 – Ananda
Kovalenko (Malakyan) – 45:31	20–3
Asatrian (Kovalenko, Saghatelian) – 45:55	21–3
A. Kuznetsov (M. Kuznetsov) – 51:38	22–3
Asatrian (Kovalenko, Saghatelian) (PP) – 55:48	23–3
Manukian (Kovalenko, M. Kuznetsov) – 58:27	24–3

29 min
Penalties
6 min
70
Shots
16

14 April 2025; 14:00	Kuwait	15–6 (2–1, 8–2, 5–3)	Indonesia	Ice Arena, Yerevan; Attendance: 32

Game reference

Adam Barvik
Zaid Al-Saeid
Goalies
Izzan Rais
Sangga Putra
Referee:
(Kazakhstan) Vladimir Yefremov
Linesmen:
(Germany) Tom Giesen
(Uzbekistan) David Prokofyev

Drozdetskikh (Budzevich, Tcibin) – 00:53	1–0
Budzevich (Drozdetskikh, Tcibin) (PP) – 03:04	2–0
	2–1	13:12 – Wijaya (Salomo, Kaykobad) (PP)
Tcibin (Drozdetskikh) – 20:17	3–1
Budzevich (Al Mari, Tcibin) – 20:49	4–1
	4–2	23:55 – Zea (Fadilla)
Budzevich (Tcibin) – 24:20	5–2
Drozdetskikh (Budzevich, Al Mari) – 28:53	6–2
Zidarevic (Vavra, Al Khashan) – 29:19	7–2
Tcibin (Al Mari, Drozdetskikh) – 33:17	8–2
Vavra (Al Khashan, Zidarevic) – 34:10	9–2
	9–3	37:41 – Hafiz (Naga)
Budzevich (Tcibin, Drozdetskikh) – 39:26	10–3
Budzevich (Al Mari, Khalaf) – 40:36	11–3
Zidarevic (Vavra, Al Awadhi) (SH) – 45:28	12–3
Al Daei (Al Khashram, Budzevich) – 46:13	13–3
	13–4	50:48 – Salomo (Wijaya)
Drozdetskikh (Tcibin) (SH) – 54:02	14–4
	14–5	54:42 – Naga (Bagaskara, Alqaeda) (PP)
	14–6	55:50 – Hafiz (Naga, Siregar) (PP)
Tcibin (Drozdetskikh, Budzevich) (SH) – 56:07	15–6

29 min
Penalties
2 min
80
Shots
24

14 April 2025; 17:00	Iran	5–1 (3–0, 0–1, 2–0)	Malaysia	Ice Arena, Yerevan; Attendance: 128

Game reference

Soheil Khalaj
Goalies
Muhammad Haikal
Mathaeus Grason Yu
Referee:
(United Arab Emirates) Yahya Al-Jneibi
Linesmen:
(Indonesia) Andianto Hie
(Czech Republic) Vít Lederer

Keyhanfar (Ghahar, Ghorbani) (PP) – 04:29	1–0
Hamzeh (Eslami, Tajik) – 12:54	2–0
Ghorbani (Jalali) – 18:55	3–0
	3–1	20:52 – Yu (Ananda, Azra) (PP)
Keyhanfar (Moghadasi, Korehei) – 48:49	4–1
Hamzeh (Farsad, Nagheli) – 50:26	5–1

14 min
Penalties
41 min
65
Shots
14

14 April 2025; 20:00	Uzbekistan	2–3 GWS (0–0, 2–2, 0–0) (OT: 0–0) (SO: 0–1)	Armenia	Ice Arena, Yerevan; Attendance: 489

Game reference

Rustam Irgashev
Goalies
Artem Putulian
Referee:
(Japan) Kenji Kosaka
Linesmen:
(Hong Kong) Chun Hang Wong
(Kazakhstan) Vladislav Zotov

	0–1	28:54 – Khudiakov (Kovalenko, Davtian)
Sinyavsky (Jilov) – 36:04	1–1
Rasulov (Rustamkhonov) – 36:37	2–1
	2–2	37:23 – M. Kuznetsov (Davtian) (PP2)

Kravchenko (miss)
Rustamkhonov (miss)
Nazarevich (miss)
Jilov (miss)
Shootout
(miss) Manukian
M.Kuznetsov
(miss) A. Kuznetsov
Kovalenko
8 min
Penalties
10 min
59
Shots
35

16 April 2025; 14:00	Iran	0–20 (0–7, 0–6, 0–7)	Uzbekistan	Ice Arena, Yerevan; Attendance: 56

Game reference

Soheil Khalaj
Alireza Mahdavi
Goalies
Rustam Irgashev
Aleksandr An
Referee:
(United Arab Emirates) Yahya Al-Jneibi
Linesmen:
(Indonesia) Andianto Hie
(Kazakhstan) Vladislav Zotov

0–1	02:16 – Golubovich (Dorofeev, Nazarevich)
0–2	03:14 – Kravchenko (Sinyavskiy, Jilov)
0–3	07:40 – Jilov (Sinyavskiy, Kravchenko)
0–4	10:28 – Maltsev (Azimov, Bagautdinov)
0–5	11:08 – Kogan (Nasirov, Nazarevich)
0–6	12:13 – Rakhimov (Sinyavskiy, Jilov)
0–7	15:56 – Kravchenko (Dorofeev, Jilov) (PP)
0–8	21:39 – Sinyavskiy (Dorofeev, Azimov) (PP)
0–9	26:10 – Sinyavskiy (Dorofeev, Maltsev) (PP)
0–10	26:52 – Kravchenko (Sinyavskiy, Jilov)
0–11	27:18 – Popov (Nasirov, Kogan)
0–12	30:14 – Sinyavskiy (Rakhimov, Kravchenko)
0–13	32:52 – Dadakhodjaev (Rustamkhonov)
0–14	46:30 – Sinyavskiy (Jilov, Nazarevich)
0–15	46:58 – Dorofeev (Golubovich, Rasulov)
0–16	49:25 – Kogan (Nasirov, Popov)
0–17	49:39 – Kravchenko (Jilov, Sinyavskiy)
0–18	52:02 – Rustamkhonov (Rasulov, Dorofeev)
0–19	52:50 – Azimov (Rustamkhonov, Nazarevich)
0–20	55:03 – Jilov (Kravchenko, Dorofeev) (PP)

8 min
Penalties
0 min
3
Shots
87

16 April 2025; 17:00	Indonesia	7–4 (2–0, 2–3, 3–1)	Malaysia	Ice Arena, Yerevan; Attendance: 73

Game reference

Izzan Rais
Goalies
Muhammad Haikal
Mathaeus Grason Yu
Referee:
(Iran) Ramin Atighechi
Linesmen:
(Germany) Tom Giesen
(Malaysia) Edmond Ng

Salomo (Kaykobad) (PP) – 05:38	1–0
Wijaya – 17:06	2–0
	2–1	24:42 – Ananda (SH)
	2–2	30:23 – Noor (Versluis, Ananda)
	2–3	31:58 – K. Amin (Fadzli)
Hafiz (Naga) – 33:47	3–3
Naga (Siregar) – 34:26	4–3
	4–4	40:32 – Azra (Ananda)
Hafiz – 41:01	5–4
Wijaya (Salomo, Praptasuganda) – 51:00	6–4
Praptasuganda (Naga, Kaykobad) – 52:16	7–4

41 min
Penalties
12 min
28
Shots
44

16 April 2025; 20:00	Kuwait	5–4 OT (2–0, 2–2, 0–2) (OT: 1–0)	Armenia	Ice Arena, Yerevan; Attendance: 512

Game reference

Adam Barvik
Goalies
Artem Putulian
Referee:
(Kazakhstan) Vladimir Yefremov
Linesmen:
(Czech Republic) Vít Lederer
(Uzbekistan) David Prokofyev

Drozdetskikh (Budzevich, Khalaf) – 11:46	1–0
Budzevich (Vavra, Drozdetskikh) (PP) – 18:53	2–0
Budzevich (Drozdetskikh) – 24:49	3–0
Zidarevic (Budzevich, Tcibin) (PP) – 26:34	4–0
	4–1	32:59 – Krivykh (Kovalenko, Ivanov)
	4–2	33:48 – A. Kuznetsov (Manukian, M. Kuznetsov) (EA)
	4–3	40:41 – Manukian
	4–4	57:45 – Manukian (M. Kuznetsov, Khudiakov) (PP)
Drozdetskikh (Tcibin) – 62:08	5–4

10 min
Penalties
24 min
22
Shots
70

17 April 2025; 14:00	Uzbekistan	26–1 (9–1, 10–0, 7–0)	Indonesia	Ice Arena, Yerevan; Attendance: 88

Game reference

Rustam Irgashev
Aleksandr An
Goalies
Izzan Rais
Sangga Putra
Referee:
(Kazakhstan) Vladimir Yefremov
Linesmen:
(Indonesia) Andianto Hie
(Hong Kong) Chun Hang Wong

Dorofeev (Golubovich, Khabibov) – 02:06	1–0
Kogan (Nasirov) – 04:35	2–0
Kravchenko (Sinyavskiy, Jilov) – 05:57	3–0
	3–1	07:25 – Salomo (Prijanto) (PP)
Azimov (Nazarevich, Dadakhodjaev) – 07:58	4–1
Dadakhodjaev (Rakhimov, Rustamkhonov) – 13:02	5–1
Jilov (Dorofeev, Kravchenko) (PP) – 14:46	6–1
Nazarevich – 15:41	7–1
Golubovich (Dorofeev) – 19:23	8–1
Petrosyan – 19:41	9–1
Nazarevich (Rasulov, Golubovich) (PP) – 21:11	10–1
Kravchenko (Jilov, Sinyavskiy) – 27:33	11–1
Dorofeev (Golubovich) – 27:44	12–1
Kravchenko (Jilov, Sinyavskiy) – 32:14	13–1
Rasulov (Dorofeev) – 32:34	14–1
Golubovich (Rasulov, Dorofeev) – 32:57	15–1
Popov (Nasirov) – 34:39	16–1
Kogan (Popov) – 35:37	17–1
Sinyavskiy (Kravchenko, Bagautdinov) – 37:03	18–1
Rustamkhonov (Azimov, Dadakhodjaev) – 39:34	19–1
Sinyavskiy (Kravchenko, Bagautdinov) – 40:24	20–1
Jilov (Sinyavskiy) – 40:36	21–1
Azimov (Dadakhodjaev, Rustamkhonov) – 43:47	22–1
Dorofeev (Golubovich) – 45:59	23–1
Rustamkhonov (Azimov, Maltsev) – 47:34	24–1
Jilov (Kravchenko, Rakhimov) – 52:07	25–1
Popov (Nasirov) – 54:54	26–1

4 min
Penalties
8 min
80
Shots
5

17 April 2025; 17:00	Malaysia	9–22 (2–5, 3–7, 4–10)	Kuwait	Ice Arena, Yerevan; Attendance: 57

Game reference

Mathaeus Grason Yu
Tengku Abdillah Azlly
Goalies
Zaid Al-Saeid
Referee:
(United Arab Emirates) Yahya Al-Jneibi
Linesmen:
(Germany) Tom Giesen
(Uzbekistan) David Prokofyev

	0–1	00:40 - Tcibin (Budzevich, Drozdetskikh)
Low (Manjohari, Hazurin) – 02:52	1–1
	1–2	09:42 – Drozdetskikh (Tcibin, Vavra) (PP)
	1–3	12:16 – Al Khashan (Al Ajmi)
	1–4	13:03 – Tcibin
	1–5	14:30 – Tcibin (Budzevich, Drozdetskikh)
Azra (Ananda, Noor) – 15:35	2–5
	2–6	22:18 – Zidarevic (Vavra) (SH)
Yu (A.R. Amin, Versluis) – 25:21	3–6
	3–7	27:43 – Drozdetskikh (Tcibin)
	3–8	31:28 – Al Duaij (Drozdetskikh, Al Mari)
Versluis (Fadzli) – 32:50	4–8
	4–9	33:11 – Drozdetskikh (Tcibin, Al Duaij)
	4–10	34:04 – Vavra (Al Maragi, Zidarevic)
	4–11	34:16 – Zidarevic (Vavra, Al Awadhi)
	4–12	37:44 – Budzevich (Drozdetskikh)
A.R. Amin (Ananda) – 39:24	5–12
	5–13	41:46 – Zidarevic (Al Awadhi, Vavra)
	5–14	44:02 – Zidarevic (Tcibin, Drozdetskikh) (PP)
	5–15	45:14 – Tcibin (Drozdetskikh, Budzevich)
	5–16	45:55 – Tcibin (Budzevich, Drozdetskikh)
Yu (Ananda, Azra) – 47:44	6–16
	6–17	49:49 – Tcibin
Fadzli (Versluis) – 51:14	7–17
Fadzli (Versluis, Ananda) (PP) – 53:19	8–17
	8–18	54:08 – Al Daei (Vavra, Zidarevic)
	8–19	55:39 – Al Maraqi
	8–20	56:40 – Al Mari (Tcibin, Drozdetskikh)
	8–21	57:18 – Zidarevic (Vavra, Al Awadhi)
	8–22	58:34 – Tcibin (Drozdetskikh) (SH2)
Azra (A.R. Amin) (PP2) – 59:15	9–22

4 min
Penalties
18 min
37
Shots
59

17 April 2025; 20:00	Armenia	8–0 (3–0, 3–0, 2–0)	Iran	Ice Arena, Yerevan; Attendance: 456

Game reference

Artem Putulian
Dmitriy Mazanko
Goalies
Soheil Khalaj
Referee:
(Slovakia) Juraj Konč
Linesmen:
(Czech Republic) Vít Lederer
(Malaysia) Edmond Ng

A. Kuznetsov (Manukian, Davtian) – 14:02	1–0
Manukian (A. Kuznetsov, Ambartsumian) – 16:12	2–0
Kovalenko (Asatrian, Lebedev) – 19:20	3–0
Asatrian (Malakyan, Saghatelian) – 30:26	4–0
Khudiakov (A. Kuznetsov, M. Kuznetsov) – 36:33	5–0
M. Kuznetsov (Manukian, Khudiakov) – 39:59	6–0
A. Kuznetsov (M. Kuznetsov, Krivykh) – 41:54	7–0
Khudiakov (M. Kuznetsov, Malakyan) – 45:47	8–0

27 min
Penalties
2 min
48
Shots
21

19 April 2025; 14:00	Malaysia	3–18 (2–11, 1–2, 0–5)	Uzbekistan	Ice Arena, Yerevan; Attendance: 38

Game reference

Tengku Abdillah Azlly
Muhammad Haikal
Goalies
Aleksandr An
Daniel Muratov
Referee:
(United Arab Emirates) Yahya Al-Jneibi
Linesmen:
(Hong Kong) Chun Hang Wong
(Kazakhstan) Vladislav Zotov

	0–1	01:46 – Azimov (Dadakhodjaev, Rustamkhonov)
	0–2	04:23 – Kravchenko (Sinyavskiy, Jilov)
	0–3	04:59 – Dorofeev (Rakhimov, Golubovich)
	0–4	06:52 – Nasirov (Kogan, Nazarevich)
	0–5	10:58 – Rustamkhonov (Azimov, Dadakhodjaev)
Goh (Versluis, Fadzli) – 12:29	1–5
	1–6	12:44 – Nazarevich (Golubovich)
	1–7	12:57 – Rasulov (Dorofeev, Golubovich)
Goh – 13:26	2–7
	2–8	13:36 – Kogan (Maltsev, Bagautdinov)
	2–9	15:38 – Kravchenko (Nazarevich, Jilov)
	2–10	15:47 – Nazarevich (Jilov, Sinyavskiy)
	2–11	19:12 – Kogan (Nasirov, Nazarevich)
	2–12	20:49 – Kravchenko (Sinyavskiy, Bagautdinov)
Fadzli (Goh, Versluis) – 25:20	3–12
	3–13	32:31 – Sinyavskiy (Kravchenko, Rakhimov)
	3–14	46:09 – Popov (Bagautdinov, Maltsev)
	3–15	47:30 – Sinyavskiy (Kravchenko, Jilov)
	3–16	50:15 – Rustamkhonov (Dadakhodjaev)
	3–17	51:56 – Jilov (Kravchenko, Sinyavskiy)
	3–18	53:19 – Dorofeev (Rasulov, Golubovich)

4 min
Penalties
4 min
9
Shots
75

19 April 2025; 17:00	Indonesia	1–14 (0–8, 0–2, 1–4)	Armenia	Ice Arena, Yerevan; Attendance: 476

Game reference

Izzan Rais
Goalies
Artem Putulian
Dmitriy Mazanko
Referee:
(Japan) Kenji Kosaka
Linesmen:
(Malaysia) Edmond Ng
(Uzbekistan) David Prokofyev

	0–1	00:17 – Kovalenko (Krivykh, A. Kuznetsov)
	0–2	05:50 – Khudiakov (Davtian, Asatrian)
	0–3	07:49 – M. Kuznetsov (Ivanov, Davtian) (PP)
	0–4	08:46 – A. Kuznetsov (Yenokyan, Egiazarian)
	0–5	12:40 – Krivykh (Kovalenko, M. Kuznetsov) (PP)
	0–6	13:51 – Khudiakov (Asatrian, Saghatelian) (PP)
	0–7	19:43 – Saghatelian (Asatrian, M. Kuznetsov)
	0–8	19:59 – Kovalenko (Egiazarian, Saghatelian)
	0–9	31:56 – Ambartsumian (Kovalenko, A. Kuznetsov)
	0–10	35:05 – Kuzminov (Davtian, Kovalenko)
Siregar (Naga, Hafiz) – 45:12	1–10
	1–11	49:01 – Krivykh (A. Kuznetsov)
	1–12	53:03 – Khudiakov (M. Kuznetsov, Lebedev)
	1–13	53:39 – A. Kuznetsov (M. Kuznetsov)
	1–14	57:34 – M. Kuznetsov (Krivykh, Kovalenko)

8 min
Penalties
8 min
15
Shots
56

19 April 2025; 20:00	Iran	0–11 (0–2, 0–5, 0–4)	Kuwait	Ice Arena, Yerevan; Attendance: 69

Game reference

Soheil Khalaj
Goalies
Adam Barvik
Referee:
(Slovakia) Juraj Konč
Linesmen:
(Germany) Tom Giesen
(Czech Republic) Vít Lederer

0–1	06:34 - Al Mari (Drozdetskikh, Tcibin)
0–2	10:32 – Tcibin (Drozdetskikh)
0–3	20:11 – Drozdetskikh (Tcibin)
0–4	22:35 – Tcibin (Drozdetskikh, Alasousi)
0–5	26:34 – Drozdetskikh (Tcibin, Al Mari)
0–6	33:39 – Al Mari (Drozdetskikh, Tcibin)
0–7	37:07 – Vavra
0–8	46:33 – Budzevich (Tcibin) (PP)
0–9	55:55 – Tcibin (Vavra, Drozdetskikh)
0–10	57:05 – Drozdetskikh (Tcibin, Vavra) (PP)
0–11	59:15 – Tcibin (Drozdetskikh, Budzevich)

6 min
Penalties
6 min
37
Shots
51

== Statistics ==
=== Scoring leaders ===
List shows the top skaters sorted by points, then goals.

Player	GP	G	A	Pts	+/−	PIM	POS
(Kuwait) Ilia Drozdetskikh	5	13	23	36	+29	8	F
(Kuwait) Anton Tcibin	5	14	21	35	+29	0	D
(Uzbekistan) Vadim Kravchenko	5	13	12	25	+25	0	F
(Uzbekistan) Vasiliy Jilov	5	6	19	25	+24	0	F
(Kuwait) Valery Budzevich	5	10	13	23	+24	6	F
(Uzbekistan) Pavel Sinyavskiy	5	10	13	23	+25	4	F
(Armenia) Maksim Kuznetsov	5	7	15	22	+23	0	F
(Uzbekistan) Egor Dorofeev	5	6	13	19	+15	0	F
(Armenia) Artem Kuznetsov	5	11	7	18	+22	0	F
(Armenia) Tigran Manukian	4	8	7	15	+13	0	F

GP = Games played; G = Goals; A = Assists; Pts = Points; +/− = Plus/Minus; PIM = Penalties in Minutes; POS = Position
Source: IIHF.com

=== Goaltending leaders ===
Only the top five goaltenders, based on save percentage, who have played at least 40% of their team's minutes, are included in this list.

Player	TOI	GA	GAA	SA	Sv%	SO
(Armenia) Artem Putulian	228:34	9	2.36	106	91.51	0
(Kuwait) Adam Barvik	214:18	19	5.32	203	90.64	1
(Uzbekistan) Rustam Irgashev	172:10	6	2.09	60	90.00	0
(Indonesia) Izzan Rais	252:35	41	9.74	248	83.47	0
(Iran) Soheil Khalaj	291:49	40	8.22	219	81.74	0

TOI = time on ice (minutes:seconds); SA = shots against; GA = goals against; GAA = goals against average; Sv% = save percentage; SO = shutouts
Source: IIHF.com

== Awards ==
Position	Player
Goaltender	(Armenia) Artem Putulian
Defenceman	(Kuwait) Anton Tcibin
Forward	(Uzbekistan) Vadim Kravchenko

== See also ==
- Ice Hockey Federation of Armenia
