= Armenia men's national under-18 ice hockey team =

The Armenia men's national under-18 ice hockey team is the men's national under-18 ice hockey team of Armenia. The team is managed by the Ice Hockey Federation of Armenia, a member of the International Ice Hockey Federation. The team represents Armenia at the IIHF World U18 Championships.

== International competitions ==
=== IIHF World U18 Championships ===
- 2005: 3rd in Division III Qualification
- 2008: 5th in Division III Group B

== See also ==
- Armenian Hockey League
- Armenia men's national junior ice hockey team
- Armenia national ice hockey team
- Ice hockey in Armenia
- Sport in Armenia
