= CHL Import Draft =

Annual junior ice hockey event

- Date: Annually in June or July
- Country: Canada and United States
- Inaugurated: 1992
- Major events: Non-Canadian/American player draft
- Organizer: Canadian Hockey League (CHL)
- Website: www.chl.ca/draft/

The CHL Import Draft is an annual event in which every team in the Canadian Hockey League (CHL) may select the rights to eligible import players. An import is classified as a player who does not have residency status in either Canada or the United States. The draft is conducted online, during the last week of June, or first week of July, following the NHL entry draft. Teams from the Western Hockey League, Ontario Hockey League, and Quebec Maritimes Junior Hockey League, systematically take turns making selections. Teams can have a maximum of two imports which may only be obtained through the draft. The draft is open to all position players, but a ban on drafting European goalkeepers was in effect from 2014 to 2017. As of the 2025 draft, 2,380 players have been selected, with many later going onto the National Hockey League.

== History and process ==
The CHL Import Draft began in 1992. It is an annual event in which every team in the Canadian Hockey League (CHL) may select the rights to eligible import players. An import is classified as a player who does not have residency status in either Canada or the United States. The draft is conducted online, during the last week of June, or first week of July, following the NHL entry draft. Teams from the Western Hockey League (WHL), Ontario Hockey League (OHL), and Quebec Maritimes Junior Hockey League (QMJHL), systematically take turns making selections in reverse order of the team's standings in the CHL from the previous season. Teams can have a maximum of two imports which may only be obtained through the draft, and teams must have an open roster space for an import player before a draft selection is made, otherwise they must pass on the opportunity. As of the 2025 draft, 2,380 players have been selected, with many later going onto the National Hockey League (NHL). The majority of imported players come from the Czech Republic, Russia, and Slovakia.

== Inherent risk assessment ==
The Import Draft has inherent risks that teams must assess, before making a draft pick which costs $2,000 up front. Drafted players may choose not to report, therefore teams want to be certain a player will. Potential draftees have often been previously chosen in the NHL entry draft, and thus have an incentive to report to a CHL team because NHL teams want prospects closer for development. Also, there is more exposure to scouts in North America for imports not drafted by an NHL team. Competition with the KHL Junior Draft for the same player is also an obstacle. Imported players usually prefer playing in the CHL instead of the United States Hockey League (USHL), due to the higher level of competition.

Most CHL teams have contacted few players in advance of the draft. Scouting these players is difficult as most teams do not employ European scouts, but rather rely on videos and limited exposure at international tournaments. Players may also have professional contracts in European domestic leagues. The current system can be compared to an auction, where teams are bidding for services in competition with these other leagues, and have to pay large release fees.

Once an import draftee reports to a CHL team, there is also risk involved in whether the player adapts to being far away from home, the ability to speak English or French, playing on smaller ice surfaces, and the more physical North American game. There is a year-long moratorium on trading the pick, once in the CHL, which is to prevent bidding for services by larger market clubs. One benefit of selecting an import player before he is drafted into the NHL, is that he is treated like a North American player in the sense that he will either have to play in the CHL or NHL, and not in the American Hockey League.

== Eligibility and residency ==
Teams may choose any player who meets age requirements, and resides outside of the normal territorial claims for the entry draft of the constituent leagues. To avoid the Import Draft, foreign-born players have come to play minor hockey in Canada or the United States and earn local status. Draft eligibility is based on the parents’ full-time residence, by looking at housing deeds, banking records, or lease agreements, rather than the length of time spent in the country. Cases for local status are dealt with individually by the CHL. Examples of foreign-born players classified as locals include David Levin from Israel, Daniel Sprong from the Netherlands, and Alex Galchenyuk who was born in Wisconsin of a Belarusian father. Examples of players denied local status include Ivan Provorov and Toronto Maple Leafs prospect Nikita Korostelev from Russia, and Tampa Bay Lightning prospect Dennis Yan, despite being born in Oregon.

Teams from the QMJHL have fewer American states to choose from compared to the WHL and OHL, and use the import draft to build competitive rosters. The New England states also see tough competition from NCAA Division I colleges for the same players.

Territorial claims of the Canadian Hockey League
League	Provinces & Territories	States
WHL	Alberta, British Columbia, Manitoba, Northwest Territories, Saskatchewan, Yukon	All states west of the Mississippi River, excluding Missouri
OHL	Ontario	All states east of the Mississippi River, plus Missouri, but excluding New England states
QMJHL	Quebec, New Brunswick, Nova Scotia; Prince Edward Island, Newfoundland and Labrador	All New England states

== European goalkeeper ban ==
On June 11, 2013, the CHL announced that the upcoming Import Draft would be the final opportunity to select European goalkeepers. Teams could draft 1994 or 1995 birth-year goalkeepers only in the first round of the 2013 Import Draft, and current import goalkeepers in the CHL would remain eligible to continue playing until the standard age limit. The CHL cited the need to improve Canadian goalkeeping as a reason behind the change. The move is seen as a response to Hockey Canada's recent inability to develop top notch goaltenders. The Canadian junior team had not won a World Junior Championship since 2009, which was blamed on poor goalkeeping. Other signs of Canada's goalkeeper weakness include: the 2013 CHL Goaltender of the Year award went to Patrik Bartosak of the Czech Republic, all three Vezina Trophy finalists in the 2012–13 NHL season were Europeans, and a Canadian had not been the first goalkeeper chosen in the NHL Entry Draft in five years. Arguments were made that Canadian goalkeepers were not getting a chance to develop, and that teams contending for a championship were drafting goaltenders from Europe. The change may actually benefit the banned goalkeepers, as statistics indicate that the best European goalkeepers have been developed in their own domestic leagues.

The CHL began reevaluating the ban in February 2018, in cooperation with Hockey Canada. Commissioner David Branch said that the ban was never viewed as a mistake, and its reversal was not trying to right a wrong; rather it was about comparing the development programs since put in place to best serve the interest of the Canadian goalkeeper. USA Hockey has implemented similar programs, and the USHL recently slackened its import player rules, allowing more Canadians and Europeans. The proposal to resume drafting European goalkeepers claims that it brings more competition, and forces Canadians to prove their talents against a broader pool. In the four NHL Entry Drafts since the ban was implemented, 36 goalkeepers have been selected from Europe, 26 from elsewhere in North America (National Collegiate Athletic Association, USHL, North American Hockey League), and 22 from the CHL. For the 2018 draft, the ban was lifted and European goalkeepers became eligible again for selection.

== Draft selections by origin ==
List of CHL Import Draft selections, organized by International Ice Hockey Federation member association of origin. (Updated as of the 2025 draft)

Nation	First pick	Last pick	Number of draft picks	Number of NHL players (Note: NHL totals indicate being on an active roster or dressed for a game, rather than a game played. eg. Levente Szuper from Hungary. The NHL player also may have been chosen in the CHL Import Draft, but did not play for the CHL team which drafted him. eg. Nik Antropov from Kazakhstan.)	Ref.
Armenia	2009	2009	1	0	
Austria	1992	2025	29	4	
Belarus	1992	2025	91	7	
Belgium	2008	2008	1	0	
Bulgaria	2022	2022	1	0	
Czechia	1992	2025	651	131	
Denmark	1993	2025	37	10	
Estonia	1994	1994	1	0	
Finland	1992	2025	159	32	
France	1992	2024	8	1	
Germany	1993	2025	93	12	
Hungary	1998	2025	3	1	
Israel	2008	2008	1 (Note: Kirill Polozov was drafted in 2008 as a Russian and later represented Israel in 2024.)	0	
Italy	1993	2025	8	0	
Japan	1993	2023	3	0	
Kazakhstan	1993	2025	13	2	
Kuwait	2003	2003	1	0	
Latvia	1992	2025	71	12	
Lithuania	1995	2025	4	1	
Mexico	2015	2015	1	0	
Netherlands	2015	2015	1	0	
Norway	1993	2025	25	4	
Poland	1994	2023	5	0	
Romania	2004	2014	3	0	
Russia (Note: Alexander Karmanov was born in Chisinau, Moldova, however as of September 2023 Moldova has ceased being a member organization of the IIHF due to a lack of ice hockey activity. Karmanov also has Russian citizenship.) (Note: Nikita Klepov was born in Deerfield Beach, Florida, but played youth hockey in Russia and is therefore considered Russian by the CHL.)	1992	2025	465	106	
Serbia	2002	2002	1	0	
Slovakia	1992	2025	341	60	
Slovenia	1997	2023	19	2	
Spain	2001	2001	1	0	
Sweden	1992	2025	170	46	
Switzerland	1997	2025	111	19	
Ukraine	1992	2025	53	3	
United Kingdom (Note: United Kingdom totals include both England and Wales.)	1993	2021	7 (Note: Some players were selected twice in the CHL Import Draft, when not reporting to the team that initially drafted them in a previous draft. eg. Stevie Lyle from Wales, drafted twice by the Plymouth Whalers.)	0	
Uzbekistan	2015	2015	1	0	
Totals			2,380	453	
