= 2006–07 Armenian Hockey League season =

Armenian ice hockey league season

The 2006–07 Armenian Hockey League season was the sixth season of the Armenian Hockey League, the top level of ice hockey in Armenia. Five teams participated in the league, and Urartu Yerevan won the championship.

== Regular season ==
| | Club | GP | W | T | L | Goals | Pts |
|---|---|---|---|---|---|---|---|
| 1. | Urartu Yerevan | 16 | 16 | 0 | 0 | 121-23 | 48 |
| 2. | HC Shengavit Yerevan | 16 | 11 | 0 | 5 | 68-43 | 33 |
| 3. | SCA Yerevan | 16 | 8 | 0 | 8 | 60-60 | 24 |
| 4. | HC Dinamo Yerevan | 16 | 5 | 0 | 11 | 38-73 | 15 |
| 5. | HC Shirak Gyumri | 16 | 0 | 0 | 16 | 18-106 | 0 |

== Final ==
- Urartu Yerevan - HC Shengavit Yerevan (3-0, 4-2)
