= 2009–10 Armenian Hockey League season =

Armenian ice hockey league season

The 2009–10 Armenian Hockey League season was the ninth season of the Armenian Hockey League. Urartu Yerevan won the Armenian championship for the fourth consecutive year.
