= 2002–03 Armenian Hockey League season =

Armenian ice hockey league season

The 2002–03 Armenian Hockey League season was the second season of the Armenian Hockey League, the first since 2001. Dinamo Yerevan won their first Armenian championship.
