= 2017 IIHF World U18 Championship Division III =

2017 IIHF U18 World Championship Division III

Tournament details
- Host countries: Taiwan; Mexico
- Venues: 2 (in 2 host cities)
- Dates: 21–27 March 2017; 17–19 March 2017
- Teams: 9

The 2017 IIHF World U18 Championship Division III was two international under-18 men's ice hockey tournaments organized by the International Ice Hockey Federation. The Division II A and Division II B tournaments represent the sixth and the seventh tier of the IIHF World U18 Championship.

== Division III A ==
2017 IIHF World U18 Championship Division III A
Tournament details
- Host country: Taiwan
- Venue: 1 (in 1 host city)
- Dates: 21–27 March
- Teams: 6

Tournament statistics
- Games played: 15
- Goals scored: 121 (8.07 per game)
- Attendance: 7,382 (492 per game)
- Scoring leader: (China) Huang Qianyi (20 points)

Official website
- IIHF.com

The Division III A tournament was played in Taipei, Taiwan, from 21 to 27 March 2017.

=== Participants ===
Team	Qualification
China	placed 6th in 2016 Division II B and were relegated
Turkey	placed 2nd in 2016 Division III A
Bulgaria	placed 3rd in 2016 Division III A
Israel	placed 4th in 2016 Division III A
Chinese Taipei	hosts; placed 5th in 2016 Division III A
New Zealand	placed 1st in 2016 Division III B and were promoted

=== Match officials ===
4 referees and 7 linesmen were selected for the tournament.

Referees

- (Netherlands) Jeronimus den Ridder
- (Latvia) Jevgeņijs Griškevičs
- (United Kingdom) Stefan Hogarth
- (Poland) Bartosz Kaczmarek

Linesmen

- (South Africa) Jonathan Mark Burger
- (Japan) Shunsuke Ichikawa
- (Canada) Dustin McCrank
- (Italy) Simone Mischiatti
- (Lithuania) Laurynas Stepankevičius
- (Belgium) Maarten van den Acker
- (Netherlands) Nick Verbruggen

=== Standings ===
Pos	Team	Pld	W	OTW	OTL	L	GF	GA	GD	Pts	Promotion or relegation
1	China	5	5	0	0	0	36	1	+35	15	Promoted to the 2018 Division II B
2	Israel	5	4	0	0	1	21	8	+13	12	
3	Chinese Taipei (H)	5	2	1	0	2	16	13	+3	8	
4	Bulgaria	5	2	0	0	3	18	18	0	6	
5	Turkey	5	1	0	0	4	19	39	−20	3	
6	New Zealand	5	0	0	1	4	11	42	−31	1	Relegated to the 2018 Division III B

Source: IIHF
Rules for classification: 1) points; 2) head-to-head points; 3) head-to-head goal difference; 4) head-to-head number of goals scored; 5) result against closest best-ranked team outside tied teams; 6) result against second-best ranked team outside tied teams; 7) seeding before tournament.
(H) Host

=== Results ===
All times are local. (National Standard Time – UTC+8)

21 March 2017; 13:00	Bulgaria	0–6 (0–6, 0–0, 0–0)	China	Taipei Arena, Taipei; Attendance: 200

Game reference
14 min	Penalties	22 min
19	Shots	44

21 March 2017; 16:30	New Zealand	2–8 (0–2, 0–3, 2–3)	Israel	Taipei Arena, Taipei; Attendance: 150

Game reference
6 min	Penalties	10 min
28	Shots	56

21 March 2017; 20:00	Turkey	1–8 (0–3, 0–0, 1–5)	Chinese Taipei	Taipei Arena, Taipei; Attendance: 537

Game reference
10 min	Penalties	20 min
32	Shots	34

22 March 2017; 13:00	Turkey	3–9 (1–2, 2–3, 0–4)	Bulgaria	Taipei Arena, Taipei; Attendance: 215

Game reference
27 min	Penalties	24 min
39	Shots	29

22 March 2017; 16:30	China	3–0 (1–0, 2–0, 0–0)	Israel	Taipei Arena, Taipei; Attendance: 258

Game reference
10 min	Penalties	6 min
39	Shots	25

22 March 2017; 20:00	Chinese Taipei	3–2 OT (0–0, 2–1, 0–1); OT: (1–0)	New Zealand	Taipei Arena, Taipei; Attendance: 495

Game reference
18 min	Penalties	20 min
59	Shots	33

24 March 2017; 13:00	Turkey	12–5 (3–1, 5–2, 4–2)	New Zealand	Taipei Arena, Taipei; Attendance: 229

Game reference
38 min	Penalties	20 min
42	Shots	35

24 March 2017; 16:30	Bulgaria	0–3 (0–3, 0–0, 0–0)	Israel	Taipei Arena, Taipei; Attendance: 254

Game reference
10 min	Penalties	14 min
40	Shots	24

24 March 2017; 20:00	China	4–0 (3–0, 0–0, 1–0)	Chinese Taipei	Taipei Arena, Taipei; Attendance: 978

Game reference
70 min	Penalties	12 min
41	Shots	36

25 March 2017; 13:00	New Zealand	0–12 (0–4, 0–3, 0–5)	China	Taipei Arena, Taipei; Attendance: 549

Game reference
14 min	Penalties	29 min
19	Shots	70

25 March 2017; 16:30	Israel	6–2 (3–0, 2–1, 1–1)	Turkey	Taipei Arena, Taipei; Attendance: 633

Game reference
10 min	Penalties	10 min
45	Shots	29

25 March 2017; 20:00	Chinese Taipei	4–2 (0–2, 1–0, 3–0)	Bulgaria	Taipei Arena, Taipei; Attendance: 1,023

Game reference
8 min	Penalties	52 min
47	Shots	35

27 March 2017; 13:00	China	11–1 (4–1, 2–0, 5–0)	Turkey	Taipei Arena, Taipei; Attendance: 211

Game reference
10 min	Penalties	10 min
69	Shots	16

27 March 2017; 16:30	Bulgaria	7–2 (1–1, 2–1, 4–0)	New Zealand	Taipei Arena, Taipei; Attendance: 327

Game reference
10 min	Penalties	8 min
37	Shots	30

27 March 2017; 20:00	Israel	4–1 (1–0, 2–0, 1–1)	Chinese Taipei	Taipei Arena, Taipei; Attendance: 1,323

Game reference
12 min	Penalties	6 min
44	Shots	25

== Division III B ==
2017 IIHF World U18 Championship Division III B
Tournament details
- Host country: Mexico
- Venue: 1 (in 1 host city)
- Dates: 17–19 March
- Teams: 3

Tournament statistics
- Games played: 3
- Goals scored: 26 (8.67 per game)
- Attendance: 900 (300 per game)
- Scoring leader: (Mexico) Jorge Ortiz (6 points)

Official website
- IIHF.com

The Division III B tournament was played in Mexico City, Mexico, from 17 to 19 March 2017.

=== Participants ===
Team	Qualification
Mexico	hosts; placed 6th in 2016 Division III A and were relegated
South Africa	placed 2nd in 2016 Division III B
Hong Kong	placed 3rd in 2016 Division III B

=== Match officials ===
2 referees and 3 linesmen were selected for the tournament.

Referees

- (United States) Sean Fernandez
- (Canada) Fraser Lawrence

Linesmen

- (United States) Ryan Madson
- (Canada) Kelsey Mahoney
- (Mexico) Sem Ramirez

=== Standings ===
Pos	Team	Pld	W	OTW	OTL	L	GF	GA	GD	Pts	Promotion
1	Mexico (H)	2	2	0	0	0	18	3	+15	6	Promoted to the 2018 Division III A
2	Hong Kong	2	1	0	0	1	4	13	−9	3	
3	South Africa	2	0	0	0	2	4	10	−6	0	

Source: IIHF
Rules for classification: 1) points; 2) head-to-head points; 3) head-to-head goal difference; 4) head-to-head number of goals scored; 5) result against closest best-ranked team outside tied teams; 6) result against second-best ranked team outside tied teams; 7) seeding before tournament.
(H) Host

=== Results ===
All times are local. (Central Standard Time – UTC–6)

17 March 2017; 20:30	Hong Kong	1–11 (0–3, 1–3, 0–5)	Mexico	Ice Dome, Mexico City; Attendance: 200

Game reference

Mathew Goldberg
Joshua Ho
Goalies
Gerardo García del Valle
Santiago Gómez
Referee:
(Canada) Fraser Lawrence
Linesmen:
(United States) Ryan Madson
(Canada) Kelsey Mahoney

	0–1	00:55 – Ramos (Díaz, Hagerman)
	0–2	04:49 – Ortiz (Ramos) (PP2)
	0–3	15:06 – Ariza
	0–4	28:38 – Cruz (Ortiz)
Au-Yeung (Ngan, J. Yiu) – 31:03	1–4
	1–5	31:57 – Cruz (Linares, Ortiz)
	1–6	37:25 – Cruz
	1–7	47:08 – Ortiz (Díaz)
	1–8	54:29 – Matsubara (Dunn)
	1–9	55:58 – Ariza (Rovalo, Rosales)
	1–10	57:20 – Valencia (Hagerman, Cruz)
	1–11	57:41 – Ortiz

6 min
Penalties
12 min
11
Shots
42

18 March 2017; 20:00	South Africa	2–3 (1–1, 0–0, 1–2)	Hong Kong	Ice Dome, Mexico City; Attendance: 100

Game reference

Alistair Bywater
Goalies
Joshua Ho
Referee:
(United States) Sean Fernandez
Linesmen:
(Canada) Kelsey Mahoney
(Mexico) Sem Ramirez

Birch – 16:08	1–0
	1–1	19:29 – Lo (Ngan)
	1–2	57:53 – Ngan
Johnson – 59:15	2–2
	2–3	59:40 – Lo (Li)

6 min
Penalties
2 min
35
Shots
14

19 March 2017; 19:00	Mexico	7–2 (3–0, 2–2, 2–0)	South Africa	Ice Dome, Mexico City; Attendance: 600

Game reference

Gerardo García del Valle
Goalies
Ryan Boyd
Referee:
(Canada) Fraser Lawrence
Linesmen:
(United States) Ryan Madson
(Canada) Kelsey Mahoney

Ortiz (Linares) – 01:02	1–0
Díaz – 06:02	2–0
Ramos (Urbano, Ariza) (PP) – 10:32	3–0
Urbano (Ramos) – 21:06	4–0
Rovalo (Ariza) – 23:51	5–0
	5–1	25:08 – Schuurman (de Jager) (PP2)
	5–2	36:49 – Schuurman (Vivier)
Urbano (Linares) – 50:06	6–2
Rovalo – 55:30	7–2

20 min
Penalties
31 min
41
Shots
29

== See also ==
- List of sporting events in Taiwan
