= 2010–11 Armenian Hockey League season =

Armenian ice hockey league season

The 2010–11 Armenian Hockey League season was the tenth season of the Armenian Hockey League. Urartu Yerevan won the league for the fifth consecutive year.
