= 2004–05 Armenian Hockey League season =

Sports season

The 2004–05 Armenian Hockey League season was the fourth season of the Armenian Hockey League, the top level of ice hockey in Armenia. Four teams participated in the league, and Dinamo Yerevan won the championship.

== Regular season ==
	Club	GP	W	T	L	Goals	Pts
1.	HC Dinamo Yerevan	12	11	1	0	78-24	23
2.	SCA Yerevan	12	8	1	3	81-35	17
3.	Shirak Gyumri	12	2	1	9	27-73	5'
4.	Shengavit Yerevan	12	1	1	10	33-87	3

== Playoffs ==
=== 3rd place ===
- Shirak Gyumri - Shengavit Yerevan (4-2, 2-3, 7-3)

=== Final ===
- HC Dinamo Yerevan - SCA Yerevan (3-6, 4-1, 3-1, 5-2)
