= Bakhtiyor Fazilov =

Uzbek businessman

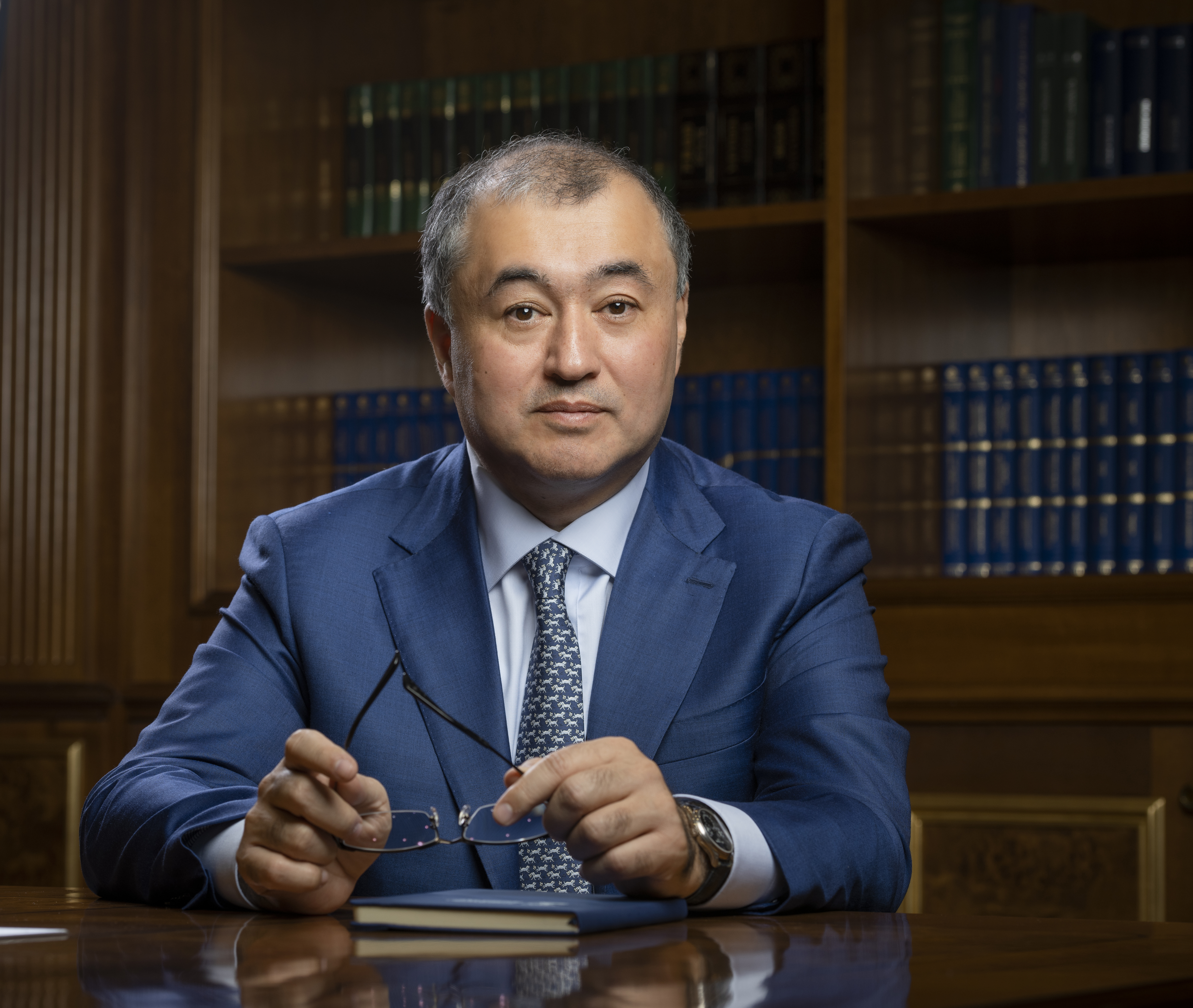
- Born: 30 July 1975 (age 51); Samarkand, Uzbekistan
- Occupations: Businessperson, entrepreneur
- Children: 3

Bakhtiyor Fazilov (born July 30, 1975) is an Uzbek businessman with a portfolio that includes the energy company Eriell, and the construction company Enter Engineering.

Fazilov created Eriell in 1999. Through deals with the Uzbek state-owned energy giant Uzbekneftegaz, Eriell gradually built a monopoly on the drilling of Uzbek oil and gas fields. Eriell entered the Russian market in 2008, making deals with Gazprom, Rosneft and Novatek, as well as selling a 46% share of the company to Gazprombank, the financial arm of the Russian state-owned energy giant Gazprom.

After the death of Former President of Uzbekistan Islam Karimov and the ascendancy of strongman Shavkat Mirziyoyev to the presidency in 2016, Fazilov's firms have prospered. Since 2017, the company has won billons of dollars' worth of contracts for the Uzbek state.

The ownership structure of Fazilov's companies is opaque. Investigative reporting have linked Fazilov to offshore companies in Cyprus, Belize and Jersey.

== Biography ==
Bakhtiyor Fazilov was born and raised in Samarkand. In 1992, after graduating from high school, he studied in the Faculty of International Economic Relations at Tashkent State University of Economics.

== Business career ==
Fazilov's first business venture was an import-export company for leather and food products.

Fazilov registered Eriell Corporation in Prague in 1999. The company initially sold drilling equipment to the Uzbek state before becoming a drilling company. By 2023, Eriell's parent company was based in the self-governing British dependency of Jersey.

Fazilov is a major shareholder in Enter Engineering, an industrial construction company founded in 2012 with over 25,000 employees. By 2019, Fazilov owned Enter Engineering through a Cypru-based company. Enter Engineering was the contractor for a 10,000 bed infectious diseases hospital near Tashkent that was built during the COVID pandemic but has remained as a permanent health facility. In 2022, Enter Engineering built Uzbekistan's largest tourist center, Silk Road Samarkand, which includes 8 luxury hotels, a congress center and a culture and entertainment complex, Eternal City.

In 2021, Fazilov became a co-owner of Jizzakh Petroleum, later Saneg. Saneg is the first company in Central Asia to establish a methane emissions reduction project.

After the opening of a new airport terminal in 2022, Fazilov was among the founders of Air Samarkand, which plans to fly to Turkey, Vietnam, Malaysia, Indonesia and China. Fazilov described the launch of the new airline as significant for the inbound tourism market, which he is involved in developing. He views Samarkand as a hub that can served as a transport crossroads, being relatively easy to reach by air from China, Western Europe and the Middle East.

Fazilov is the main beneficiary of Gazli Gas Storage, the operator of Uzbekistan's largest gas storage facility.

== Personal life ==
Fazilov is married and has three children. Fasilov has two family members in Uzbekistan's security services.

Fazilov is the president of the Uzbekistan Ice Hockey Federation, which held its first national championship in 2018. In October 2019, Uzbekistan was admitted as a member of the International Ice Hockey Federation. Fazilov is chairman of the World Society for the Preservation, Study and Popularization of the Cultural Heritage of Uzbekistan. He founded the MESCA Foundation (Medical Excellence and Science in Central Asia).

Fazilov's company was a partner in the construction of the Humo Arena in Tashkent, a 12,500 capacity sports venue that opened in 2019. Fazilov is a sponsor of the Humo Tashkent professional ice hockey team. He is also the owner of FC Surkhon Termez professional football club. The Eriell Group is renovating the Surkhon Arena stadium to meet the licensing standards of the Association of Football clubs.

In 2019, Fazilov was awarded Uzbekistan's "Selfless Service Order." In 2022, he won the Avicenna International Prize in Paris for his contribution to the preservation and study of Uzbek cultural heritage.

== See also ==
- Culture of Uzbekistan
- Economy of Uzbekistan
