= India men's national under-18 ice hockey team =

- Association: Ice Hockey Association of India
- Head coach: Amit Belwal
- Team colors
- IIHF code: IND

First international
- United Arab Emirates 31–1 India (Abu Dhabi, United Arab Emirates; 1 April 2012)

Biggest win
- India 5–0 Hong Kong (Abu Dhabi, United Arab Emirates; 2 April 2012)

Biggest defeat
- Mongolia 32–0 India (Tashkent, Uzbekistan; 23 April 2024)

IIHF U18 Challenge Cup of Asia
- Appearances: 2 (first in 2012)
- Best result: 4th (2012)

International record (W–L–T)
- 6–8–0

The India men's national under-18 ice hockey team is the men's national under-18 ice hockey team of the India. The team is controlled by the Ice Hockey Association of India, and a member of the International Ice Hockey Federation (IIHF).

== History ==
The Inda men's national under-18 ice hockey team played its first game in 2012 during the 2012 IIHF U18 Challenge Cup of Asia being held in Abu Dhabi, United Arab Emirates. India finished fourth after winning only one game against Hong Kong and losing their other three games against Malaysia, Thailand and the United Arab Emirates. The game against the United Arab Emirates was recorded as India's largest loss in international competition after they lost the game 1–31 until the defeat to Mongolia by the score of 0–32 in 2024.

== International competitions ==
- 2012 IIHF U18 Challenge Cup of Asia – 4th
- 2024 IIHF U18 Asia and Oceania Championship – 6th
- 2026 IIHF U18 Asia Cup – 5th

== See also ==
- India men's national ice hockey team
- India men's national junior ice hockey team
- India women's national ice hockey team
