= Figure Skating Federation of Armenia =

National governing body

Figure Skating Federation of Armenia logo

The Figure Skating Federation of Armenia (Armenian: Հայաստանի գեղասահքի ֆեդերացիա, romanized: Hayastani geghasahk’i federats’ia) is the regulating body of figure skating in Armenia, governed by the Armenian Olympic Committee. The headquarters of the federation is located in Yerevan.

== History ==
The Figure Skating Federation of Armenia was founded in 1994 and is currently led by Aram Vasyan. The Federation became a full member of the International Skating Union (ISU) in 1994. The Federation organizes Armenia's participation in the World Figure Skating Championships.

== ISU Junior Grand Prix in Armenia ==
The ISU Junior Grand Prix in Armenia is an international figure skating competition, organized and hosted by the Figure Skating Federation of Armenia. Medals may be awarded in the disciplines of men's singles, ladies' singles, pair skating, and ice dancing.

== See also ==
- International figure skating
- List of member federations of the International Skating Union
- Sport in Armenia
- Yerevan Figure Skating and Hockey Sports School
