= 2012 IIHF U18 Challenge Cup of Asia =

Tournament details
- Host country: United Arab Emirates
- Dates: 1–6 April 2012
- Teams: 5

Final positions
- Champions: Thailand (1st title)

Tournament statistics
- Games played: 10
- Goals scored: 126 (12.6 per game)

The 2012 IIHF U18 Challenge Cup of Asia was the first IIHF U18 Challenge Cup of Asia, an annual international ice hockey tournament held by the International Ice Hockey Federation (IIHF). It took place between 1 April and 6 April 2012 in Abu Dhabi, United Arab Emirates. Thailand won the tournament after winning all four of their round robin games and finishing first in the standings. The United Arab Emirates finished second, losing only to Thailand and Malaysia finished in third place.

== Overview ==
The 2012 IIHF U18 Challenge Cup of Asia began on 1 April 2012 in Abu Dhabi, United Arab Emirates with all of the games being played at Arena Abu Dhabi. The under-18 teams of India, Malaysia and the United Arab Emirates made their debut international appearances at the tournament while the Thailand under-18 returned to international competition, having last played in the 2002 IIHF Asian Oceanic U18 Championship. Thailand won the tournament after winning all four of their games and finishing first in the standings. The United Arab Emirates finished second, losing only to Thailand and Malaysia finished third after losing their games against Thailand and the United Arab Emirates. Phongphan Krongsakunsuk of Thailand finished as the tournaments leading scoring with 22 points including 15 goals and seven assists. Thailand's Wasunun Angkulpattanasuk finished as the leading goaltender with as save percentage of 90.00.

Hong Kong, also making their debut international under-18 competition, sent a select team that competed out of competition against the other four nations. Hong Kong was unable to compete in the tournament due to problems with player eligibility. The team won all four of their games against the other nations but the scores were officially recorded as 5–0 wins to the opposing teams.

== Standings ==
Pos	Team	Pld	W	OTW	OTL	L	GF	GA	GD	Pts
1	Thailand	4	4	0	0	0	52	4	+48	12
2	United Arab Emirates	4	3	0	0	1	46	9	+37	9
3	Malaysia	4	2	0	0	2	17	31	−14	6
4	India	4	1	0	0	3	11	62	−51	3
5	Hong Kong	4	0	0	0	4	0	20	−20	0

Source: IIHF

== Fixtures ==
All times local.

1 April 2012; 16:00	Thailand	19 – 1 (3–1, 9–0, 7–0)	Malaysia	Arena Abu Dhabi; Attendance: 123

Game reference

1 April 2012; 19:30	India	1 – 31 (1–9, 0–9, 0–13)	United Arab Emirates	Arena Abu Dhabi; Attendance: 145

Game reference

2 April 2012; 19:30	India	5 – 0 (forfeit)^{[I]}	Hong Kong	Arena Abu Dhabi; Attendance: 75

Game reference

3 April 2012; 16:00	United Arab Emirates	2 – 5 (1–3, 1–2, 0–0)	Thailand	Arena Abu Dhabi; Attendance: 125

Game reference

3 April 2012; 19:30	Hong Kong	0 – 5 (forfeit)^{[I]}	Malaysia	Arena Abu Dhabi; Attendance: 195

Game reference

4 April 2012; 19:30	Thailand	23 – 1 (6–0, 9–0, 8–1)	India	Arena Abu Dhabi; Attendance: 111

Game reference

5 April 2012; 16:00	United Arab Emirates	5 – 0 (forfeit)^{[I]}	Hong Kong	Arena Abu Dhabi; Attendance: 522

Game reference

5 April 2012; 19:30	Malaysia	8 – 4 (5–2, 2–1, 1–1)	India	Arena Abu Dhabi; Attendance: 303

Game reference

6 April 2012; 16:00	Hong Kong	0 – 5 (forfeit)^{[I]}	Thailand	Arena Abu Dhabi; Attendance: 102

Game reference

6 April 2012; 19:30	Malaysia	3 – 8 (1–2, 1–4, 1–2)	United Arab Emirates	Arena Abu Dhabi; Attendance: 547

Game reference

== Scoring leaders ==
List shows the top ten skaters sorted by points, then goals, assists, and the lower penalties in minutes.

Player	GP	G	A	Pts	+/-	PIM	POS
(Thailand) Phongphan Korngsakunsuk	3	15	7	22	+23	8	F
(Thailand) Hideki Nagayama	3	6	9	15	+20	0	F
(Thailand) Piyapong Krongsakunsuk	3	8	5	13	+18	8	F
(United Arab Emirates) Mohammed al-Dhaheri	3	9	3	12	+13	4	F
(Malaysia) Nural Badrul Arie Versluis	3	8	2	10	-6	10	F
(United Arab Emirates) Khalifa al-Mahrouqi	3	5	4	9	+12	0	F
(Thailand) Nitipol Sangbua	3	2	7	9	+13	4	F
(Thailand) Thinnaphat Bunman	3	4	4	4	+14	0	F
(United Arab Emirates) Ahmed al-Ketbi	3	3	5	8	+15	12	D
(Thailand) Tarin Sisaengsuwanchai	3	6	1	7	+10	4	F

== Leading goaltenders ==
Only the top goaltenders, based on save percentage, who have played at least 40% of their team's minutes are included in this list.

Player	MIP	SOG	GA	GAA	SVS%
(Thailand) Wasunun Angkulpattanasuk	171:45	40	4	1.40	90.00
(Malaysia) Shah Ilyas Abdul Shukor	168:56	109	26	9.23	76.15
(United Arab Emirates) Salem al-Alawi	160:00	31	8	3.00	74.19
(India) Gamandeep Singh	130:51	136	39	17.88	71.32

== Notes ==
I Hong Kong originally won the games 20–0 versus India, 26–0 Malaysia, 13–0 versus the United Arab Emirates and 9–0 versus Thailand before the games were declared forfeit at a score of 5–0 to the opposing teams.
