= 2018 IIHF World U18 Championship Division III =

2018 IIHF U18 World Championship Division III
Tournament details
- Host countries: Turkey; New Zealand
- Dates: 26 March – 1 April 2018; 26–28 April 2018
- Teams: 9

The 2018 IIHF World U18 Championship Division III was two international under-18 ice hockey tournaments organised by the International Ice Hockey Federation. The Division III A and Division III B tournaments represent the sixth and the seventh tier of the IIHF World U18 Championship.

== Division III A ==
2018 IIHF U18 World Championship Division III A

Tournament details
- Host country: Turkey
- Venue: 1 (in 1 host city)
- Dates: 26 March – 1 April 2018
- Teams: 6

Tournament statistics
- Games played: 15
- Goals scored: 108 (7.2 per game)

The Division III A tournament was played in Erzurum, Turkey, from 26 March to 1 April 2018.

=== Participants ===
Team	Qualification
Belgium	placed 6th in 2017 Division II B and were relegated
Israel	placed 2nd in 2017 Division III A
Chinese Taipei	placed 3rd in 2017 Division III A
Bulgaria	placed 4th in 2017 Division III A
Turkey	hosts; placed 5th in 2017 Division III A
Mexico	placed 1st in 2017 Division III B and were promoted

=== Final standings ===
Pos	Team	Pld	W	OTW	OTL	L	GF	GA	GD	Pts	Promotion or relegation
1	Belgium	5	4	0	0	1	35	8	+27	12	Promoted to the 2019 Division II B
2	Mexico	5	3	1	0	1	17	12	+5	11	
3	Bulgaria	5	2	0	1	2	17	19	−2	7	
4	Israel	5	1	1	1	2	12	13	−1	6 (Note: Israel 2–0 Turkey)	
5	Turkey (H)	5	2	0	0	3	11	14	−3	6	
6	Chinese Taipei	5	0	1	1	3	16	42	−26	3	Relegated to the 2019 Division III B

Source: IIHF
Rules for classification: 1) points; 2) head-to-head points; 3) head-to-head goal difference; 4) head-to-head number of goals scored; 5) result against closest best-ranked team outside tied teams; 6) result against second-best ranked team outside tied teams; 7) seeding before tournament.
(H) Host

=== Results ===
All times are local. (Further-eastern European Time – UTC+3)

26 March 2018; 13:00	Chinese Taipei	1–19 (0-4, 1-7, 0-8)	Belgium

Game reference

26 March 2018; 16:30	Mexico	4–2 (1-2, 1-0, 2-0)	Bulgaria

Game reference

26 March 2018; 20:00	Israel	2–0 (0-0, 1-0, 1-0)	Turkey

Game reference

27 March 2018; 13:00	Belgium	6–3 (0-1, 2-0, 4-2)	Bulgaria

Game reference

27 March 2018; 16:30	Israel	5–4 OT (1-1, 3-2, 0-1, 1-0)	Chinese Taipei

Game reference

27 March 2018; 20:00	Turkey	3–1 (0-1, 2-0, 1-0)	Mexico

Game reference

29 March 2018; 13:00	Israel	3–4 OT (1-1, 2-1, 0-1, 0-1)	Mexico

Game reference

29 March 2018; 16:30	Chinese Taipei	7–6 OT (3-2, 2-1, 1-3, 1-0)	Bulgaria

Game reference

29 March 2018; 20:00	Belgium	6–0 (1-0, 3-0, 2-0)	Turkey

Game reference

30 March 2018; 13:00	Bulgaria	3–1 (0-0, 2-1, 1-0)	Israel

Game reference

30 March 2018; 16:30	Mexico	3–2 (1-0, 1-1, 1-1)	Belgium

Game reference

30 March 2018; 20:00	Turkey	7–2 (1-0, 2-1, 4-1)	Chinese Taipei

Game reference

1 April 2018; 13:00	Chinese Taipei	2–5 (0-2, 0-3, 2-0)	Mexico

Game reference

1 April 2018; 16:30	Belgium	2–1 (1-1, 0-0, 1-0)	Israel

Game reference

1 April 2018; 20:00	Bulgaria	3–1 (1-0, 0-0, 2-1)	Turkey

Game reference

== Division III B ==
2018 IIHF U18 World Championship Division III B

Tournament details
- Host country: New Zealand
- Venue: 1 (in 1 host city)
- Dates: 26–28 April 2018
- Teams: 3

Tournament statistics
- Games played: 3
- Goals scored: 24 (8 per game)

The Division III B tournament was played in Queenstown, New Zealand, from 26 to 28 April 2018.

=== Participants ===
Team	Qualification
New Zealand	hosts; placed 6th in 2017 Division III A and were relegated
Hong Kong	placed 2nd in 2017 Division III B
South Africa	placed 3rd in 2017 Division III B

=== Final standings ===
Pos	Team	Pld	W	OTW	OTL	L	GF	GA	GD	Pts	Promotion
1	New Zealand (H)	2	2	0	0	0	12	6	+6	6	Promoted to the 2019 Division III A
2	Hong Kong	2	1	0	0	1	9	10	−1	3	
3	South Africa	2	0	0	0	2	3	8	−5	0	

Source: IIHF
Rules for classification: 1) points; 2) head-to-head points; 3) head-to-head goal difference; 4) head-to-head number of goals scored; 5) result against closest best-ranked team outside tied teams; 6) result against second-best ranked team outside tied teams; 7) seeding before tournament.
(H) Host

=== Results ===
All times are local. (New Zealand Standard Time – UTC+12)

26 April 2018; 19:00	South Africa	1–4 (1-1, 0-2, 0-1)	New Zealand

Game reference

27 April 2018; 19:00	Hong Kong	4–2 (1-2, 0-0, 3-0)	South Africa

Game reference

28 April 2018; 19:00	New Zealand	8–5 (2-1, 4-1, 2-3)	Hong Kong

Game reference
