= 2019 IIHF World U18 Championship Division III =

2019 IIHF U18 World Championship Division III
Tournament details
- Host countries: Bulgaria; South Africa
- Venue(s): 2 (in 2 host cities)
- Dates: 25–31 March 2019; 9–12 April 2019
- Teams: 10

The 2019 IIHF U18 World Championship Division III was two international under-18 ice hockey tournaments organised by the International Ice Hockey Federation. The Division III A and Division III B tournaments represent the sixth and the seventh tier of the IIHF World U18 Championship.

== Division III A ==
2019 IIHF U18 World Championship Division III A

Tournament details
- Host country: Bulgaria
- Venue(s): 1 (in 1 host city)
- Dates: 25–31 March
- Teams: 6

Tournament statistics
- Games played: 15
- Goals scored: 96 (6.4 per game)
- Attendance: 6,206 (414 per game)
- Scoring leader(s): (Iceland) Axel Orongan (16 points)

Official website
- Website

The Division III A tournament was played in Sofia, Bulgaria, from 25 to 31 March 2019. At the time of the tournament, Iceland was awarded second place; however, they ended up sharing the medal with Turkey.

=== Participants ===
Team	Qualification
Iceland	Placed 6th in Division II B and were relegated.
Mexico	Placed 2nd in Division III A last year.
Bulgaria	Host, placed 3rd in Division III A last year.
Israel	Placed 4th in Division III A last year.
Turkey	Placed 5th in Division III A last year.
New Zealand	Placed 1st in Division III B qualification last year.

=== Match officials ===
4 referees and 7 linesmen are selected for the tournament.

Referees	Linesmen
(Poland) Bartosz Kaczmarek; (Latvia) Andreis Kudrjasovs; (Malaysia) Yong Chun Lim; (Spain) Alexei Roshchyn	(Bulgaria) Martin Boyadjiev; (New Zealand) Edward Howard; (United Kingdom) Ilia Kiris; (China) Tiange Liu; (United States) Jonathan Sladek; (Belarus) Nazar Slezok; (Bulgaria) Vasiliy Vasilev

=== Standings ===
Pos	Team	Pld	W	OTW	OTL	L	GF	GA	GD	Pts	Promotion or relegation
1	Bulgaria (H)	5	4	1	0	0	21	11	+10	14	Promoted to the 2022 Division II B
2	Israel	5	2	1	1	1	17	13	+4	9 (Note: In head-to-head all three have 3 points, in head-to-head goal differential Israel is +1, Iceland +1, and Turkey –2. Israel defeated Iceland 4–2.)	
3	Iceland	5	3	0	0	2	23	16	+7	9	
4	Turkey	5	3	0	0	2	14	13	+1	9	
5	Mexico	5	0	1	0	4	8	20	−12	2 (Note: Mexico 5–4 (GWS) New Zealand)	
6	New Zealand	5	0	0	2	3	13	23	−10	2	Relegated to the 2022 Division III B

Source: IIHF
(H) Host

=== Results ===
All times are local (UTC+2).

25 March 2019; 14:00	Mexico	0–4 (0–3, 0–0, 0–1)	Turkey	Winter Sports Palace, Sofia; Attendance: 120

Game reference
10 min	Penalties	2 min
25	Shots	21

25 March 2019; 16:30	New Zealand	3–4 OT (1–1, 2–2, 0–0); OT: (0–1)	Israel	Winter Sports Palace, Sofia; Attendance: 139

Game reference
12 min	Penalties	14 min
31	Shots	23

25 March 2019; 20:00	Bulgaria	7–5 (2–1, 4–3, 1–1)	Iceland	Winter Sports Palace, Sofia; Attendance: 860

Game reference
14 min	Penalties	18 min
29	Shots	22

26 March 2019; 13:00	Iceland	2–4 (1–0, 1–2, 0–2)	Israel	Winter Sports Palace, Sofia; Attendance: 125

Game reference
24 min	Penalties	12 min
43	Shots	23

26 March 2019; 16:30	Turkey	3–2 (0–0, 2–1, 1–1)	New Zealand	Winter Sports Palace, Sofia; Attendance: 135

Game reference
4 min	Penalties	2 min
32	Shots	29

26 March 2019; 20:00	Mexico	1–2 (1–1, 0–1, 0–0)	Bulgaria	Winter Sports Palace, Sofia; Attendance: 580

Game reference
22 min	Penalties	10 min
22	Shots	30

28 March 2019; 13:00	Mexico	5–4 GWS (1–2, 2–1, 1–1); OT: (0–0); SO: (1–0)	New Zealand	Winter Sports Palace, Sofia; Attendance: 112

Game reference
8 min	Penalties	10 min
29	Shots	23

28 March 2019; 16:30	Iceland	5–2 (1–1, 0–1, 0–0)	Turkey	Winter Sports Palace, Sofia; Attendance: 130

Game reference
16 min	Penalties	22 min
35	Shots	27

28 March 2019; 20:00	Bulgaria	3–2 OT (0–0, 1–2, 1–0); OT: (1–0)	Israel	Winter Sports Palace, Sofia; Attendance: 650

Game reference
16 min	Penalties	10 min
40	Shots	15

29 March 2019; 13:00	New Zealand	3–6 (1–0, 0–5, 2–1)	Iceland	Winter Sports Palace, Sofia; Attendance: 110

Game reference
12 min	Penalties	22 min
18	Shots	37

29 March 2019; 16:30	Israel	5–2 (1–0, 2–1, 2–1)	Mexico	Winter Sports Palace, Sofia; Attendance: 125

Game reference
8 min	Penalties	38 min
24	Shots	17

29 March 2019; 20:00	Turkey	2–4 (0–1, 1–0, 1–3)	Bulgaria	Winter Sports Palace, Sofia; Attendance: 1,360

Game reference
6 min	Penalties	8 min
31	Shots	27

31 March 2019; 13:00	Israel	2–3 (1–1, 0–1, 1–1)	Turkey	Winter Sports Palace, Sofia; Attendance: 120

Game reference
33 min	Penalties	6 min
23	Shots	40

31 March 2019; 16:30	Bulgaria	5–1 (2–0, 1–0, 2–1)	New Zealand	Winter Sports Palace, Sofia; Attendance: 1,400

Game reference
18 min	Penalties	12 min
22	Shots	21

31 March 2019; 20:00	Iceland	5–0 (0–0, 2–0, 3–0)	Mexico	Winter Sports Palace, Sofia; Attendance: 240

Game reference
4 min	Penalties	10 min
36	Shots	18

=== Awards ===
Best Players Selected by the Directorate

- Goaltender: (Israel) Artem Loginov
- Defenceman: (Bulgaria) Nino Tomov
- Forward: (Turkey) İsmet Gökçen

Source: IIHF

== Division III B ==
2019 IIHF U18 World Championship Division III B

Tournament details
- Host country: South Africa
- Venue(s): 1 (in 1 host city)
- Dates: 9–12 April
- Teams: 4

Tournament statistics
- Games played: 6
- Goals scored: 54 (9 per game)
- Attendance: 740 (123 per game)
- Scoring leader(s): (Chinese Taipei) Chou Hung-li (9 points)

Official website
- Website

The Division III B tournament was played in Cape Town, South Africa, from 9 to 12 April 2019.

=== Participants ===
Team	Qualification
Chinese Taipei	Placed 6th in Division III A and were relegated.
Hong Kong	Placed 2nd in Division III B last year.
South Africa	Host, placed 3rd in Division III B last year.
Luxembourg	First time participating in tournament.

=== Match officials ===
3 referees and 4 linesmen are selected for the tournament.

Referees	Linesmen
(Russia) Viktor Birin; (South Korea) Lee Joo-hyun; (Denmark) Niclas Lundsgaard	(South Africa) Jonathan Burger; (Canada) Adam Harris; (Finland) Niko Jusi; (South Africa) Frank Radue

=== Standings ===
Pos	Team	Pld	W	OTW	OTL	L	GF	GA	GD	Pts	Promotion
1	Chinese Taipei	3	3	0	0	0	22	5	+17	9	Promoted to the 2022 Division III A
2	Hong Kong	3	2	0	0	1	11	15	−4	6	
3	South Africa (H)	3	0	1	0	2	13	15	−2	2	
4	Luxembourg	3	0	0	1	2	8	19	−11	1	

Source: IIHF
(H) Host

=== Results ===
All times are local (UTC+2).

9 April 2019; 14:00	Hong Kong	4–1 (0–0, 1–1, 3–0)	Luxembourg	Cape Town Ice Station, Cape Town; Attendance: 60

Game reference

Julian Mak
Goalies
Hugo Ansay
Referee:
(Russia) Viktor Birin
Linesmen:
(South Africa) Jonathan Burger
(South Africa) Frank Radue

Chu (Chang, Shum) (PP) – 30:59	1–0
	1–1	39:19 – Church (Meijer)
Chu (Shum) – 43:37	2–1
Yam (Shum) (PP) – 48:14	3–1
Chu (T. Ho) – 52:34	4–1

6 min
Penalties
12 min
41
Shots
19

9 April 2019; 19:00	South Africa	2–4 (1–1, 0–3, 1–0)	Chinese Taipei	Cape Town Ice Station, Cape Town; Attendance: 250

Game reference

Matthew Cleinwerck
Goalies
Hsaio Po-yu
Referee:
(South Korea) Lee Joo-hyun
Linesmen:
(Canada) Adam Harris
(Finland) Niko Jusi

	0–1	05:00 – Hsu (Chou, Peng)
R. Venter (EA) – 12:50	1–1
	1–2	28:02 – Chou (Wang W., Hsu) (PP)
	1–3	30:14 – Wang W. (Chou) (PP)
	1–4	35:35 – Chuang (Wu)
R. Venter (Meyer) (PP) – 54:28	2–4

16 min
Penalties
12 min
30
Shots
18

10 April 2019; 14:00	Chinese Taipei	9–2 (2–1, 4–1, 3–0)	Luxembourg	Cape Town Ice Station, Cape Town; Attendance: 50

Game reference
6 min	Penalties	10 min
38	Shots	22

10 April 2019; 18:00	Hong Kong	6–5 (1–0, 3–2, 2–3)	South Africa	Cape Town Ice Station, Cape Town; Attendance: 166

Game reference
12 min	Penalties	31 min
30	Shots	28

12 April 2019; 14:00	Chinese Taipei	9–1 (4–0, 1–0, 4–1)	Hong Kong	Cape Town Ice Station, Cape Town; Attendance: 75

Game reference
12 min	Penalties	74 min
34	Shots	14

12 April 2019; 18:00	Luxembourg	5–6 GWS (1–2, 1–1, 3–2); OT: (0–0); SO: (0–1)	South Africa	Cape Town Ice Station, Cape Town; Attendance: 139

Game reference
16 min	Penalties	8 min
23	Shots	30

=== Awards ===
Best Players Selected by the Directorate

- Goaltender: (Chinese Taipei) Hsiao Po-Yu
- Defenceman: (Luxembourg) David Church
- Forward: (Hong Kong) Ryan Chu

Source: IIHF
