= HC Dinamo Yerevan =

- City: Yerevan, Armenia
- League: Armenian Hockey League
- Founded: 2000

HC Dinamo Yerevan is an ice hockey team in Yerevan, Armenia. They play in the Armenian Hockey League, the top level of ice hockey in Armenia.

== History ==
The club was founded in 2000, and finished third in 2000–01 season. After the 2001–02 season was cancelled, Dinamo won three straight titles, in 2003, 2004, and 2005.

Since Urartu Yerevan joined the league for the 2005–06 season, Dinamo has not won another title, and their best result was second place in the 2007–08 and 2008–09 seasons.

== Achievements ==
- Armenian Hockey League champion (3): 2003, 2004, 2005.

== Results ==
- 2000-01 3rd place
- 2001-02 No championship
- 2002-03 1st place
- 2003-04 1st place
- 2004-05 1st place
- 2005-06 3rd place
- 2006-07 4th place
- 2007-08 2nd place
- 2008-09 2nd place

== See also ==
- Ice hockey in Armenia
- Ice Hockey Federation of Armenia
- Sport in Armenia
