= United Arab Emirates men's national under-18 ice hockey team =

- The United Arab Emirates uses their national emblem as the badge on the team's jerseys
- Association: UAE Ice Sports Federation
- Team colors
- IIHF code: UAE

First international
- United Arab Emirates 31 – 1 India (Abu Dhabi, United Arab Emirates; 1 April 2012)

Biggest win
- United Arab Emirates 31 – 1 India (Abu Dhabi, United Arab Emirates; 1 April 2012)

Biggest defeat
- Mongolia 12 – 3 United Arab Emirates (Samarkand, Uzbekistan; 28 April 2024)

IIHF U18 Challenge Cup of Asia
- Appearances: 1 (first in 2012)
- Best result: (2012)

International record (W–L–T)
- 3–1–0

The United Arab Emirates men's national under-18 ice hockey team is the men's national under-18 ice hockey team of the United Arab Emirates. The team is controlled by the UAE Ice Sports Federation, a member of the International Ice Hockey Federation.

== History ==
The United Arab Emirates men's national under-18 ice hockey team played its first game in 2012 during the 2012 IIHF U18 Challenge Cup of Asia being held in Abu Dhabi, United Arab Emirates. The United Arab Emirates finished in second place after winning their games against Hong Kong, India and Malaysia, only losing their fourth game against Thailand. Their opening game was against India which they won 31–1 was recorded as their largest ever win in international competition.

== International competitions ==
- 2012 IIHF U18 Challenge Cup of Asia. Finish: 2nd
