= Uzbekistan men's national ice hockey team =

Uzbekistan
- The emblem of Uzbekistan is the badge used on the players jerseys.
- Association: Uzbekistan Ice Hockey Federation
- General manager: Bakhodir Gafurov
- Head coach: Normunds Sējējs
- Assistants: Abdumajid Nasirov
- Captain: Javokhir Rasulov
- Most games: Artyom Golubovich (13)
- Top scorer: Vadim Kravchenko (32)
- Most points: Vadim Kravchenko (60)
- Team colors
- IIHF code: UZB
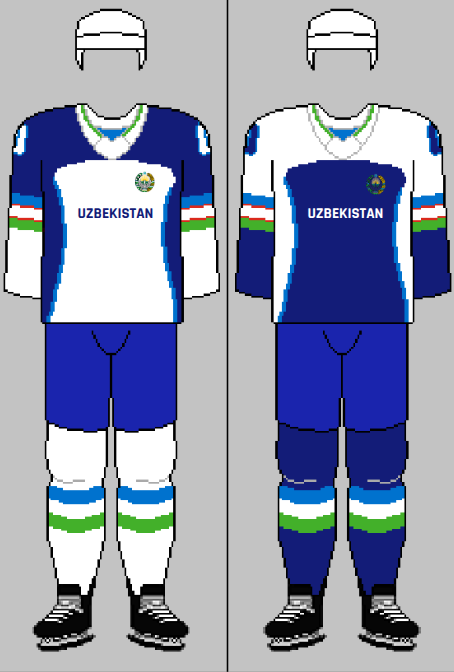

Ranking
- Current IIHF: 57 (3 June 2026)
- Highest IIHF: 57 (May 2025)

First international
- Uzbekistan 17–0 Bahrain (Kazan, Russia; 14 January 2023)

Biggest win
- Uzbekistan 26–1 Indonesia (Yerevan, Armenia; 17 April 2025); Uzbekistan 26–1 Mongolia (Hong Kong, China; 13 April 2026); Uzbekistan 28–3 Philippines (Hong Kong, China; 14 April 2026)

Biggest defeat
- Armenia 3–2 Uzbekistan (Yerevan, Armenia; 14 April 2025)

IIHF World Championships
- Appearances: 2 (first in 2025)
- Best result: 47th (2026)

International record (W–L–T)
- 10-1–0

The Uzbekistan national ice hockey team (Uzbek: Oʻzbekiston milliy xokkey terma jamoasi, Ўзбекистон миллий хоккей терма жамоаси) is the national men's ice hockey team of Uzbekistan. The team belongs to the Uzbekistan Ice Hockey Federation and has been an associate member of the International Ice Hockey Federation (IIHF) since 26 September 2019. An unofficial Uzbekistan selection took part in three Winter Spartakiads between 1978 and 1986. The national team made its IIHF World Championship debut in 2025 and immediately won Division IV. It currently ranks 57th in the IIHF World Ranking and 24th in the Asian Ranking.

== History ==
Uzbekistan, representing the Uzbek Soviet Socialist Republic, played its first game in 1978 during the Winter Spartakiad which was held in Pervouralsk, Soviet Union. They competed in six games against other regions and republics of the Soviet Union. The Uzbek SSR lost all of their games to Leningrad, the Tatar ASSR, Kuibyshev Region, the Latvian SSR and the Bashkir ASSR, but won their game against the Lithuanian SSR 6–1, but their largest recorded victory against club or other team did not count towards Uzbekistan's official international record. In 1982, the Uzbek SSR competed in their second Winter Spartakiad being held in Norilsk. They again competed in six games, again winning only once against the Lithuanian SSR. They lost their other five games against Moscow, Chelyabinsk Oblast, Kuibyshev Region, the Estonian SSR and the Latvian SSR, but their game against the Latvian SSR was recorded as their largest loss against club or other team also did not count. The Uzbek SSR competed in their last competition during the 1986 Winter Spartakiad being held in Krasnoyarsk. They competed in three games, losing all three against Lipetsk Oblast, the Latvian SSR and the Ukrainian SSR. Uzbekistan was inactive since the USSR dissolved in 1991, until 2023.

=== National team ===
Uzbekistan played an official game against other national team for the first time in 2023. At the 2023 Kazan Hockey Cup in Kazan, Russia, they defeated Bahrain 17–0, their largest victory against other national team. Although their last two games were played against clubs and other teams did not count, they defeated the Saudi Arabian club team, Jeddah Eagles, 4–2, and then a narrowly 3–2 loss to a mixed team from Algeria, Lebanon and Morocco.

== Tournament record ==
=== World Championships ===
Year	Host	Result	Pld	W	OTW	OTL	L
1954 through 1991		As part of the Soviet Union					
1992 through 2019		Not an IIHF member					
2020 through 2024		Did not enter					
2025	(Armenia) Yerevan	53rd place (1st in Division IV)	5	4	0	1	0
2026	Hong Kong	47th place (1st in Division III B)	5	5	0	0	0
Total			10	9	0	1	0

== All-time record against other national teams ==
Last match update: 19 April 2025

Key
Positive balance (more Wins)
Neutral balance (Wins = Losses)
Negative balance (more Losses)

Team	GP	W	T	L	GF	GA
Armenia	1	0	0	1	2	3
Bahrain	1	1	0	0	17	0
Hong Kong	1	1	0	0	9	4
Indonesia	1	1	0	0	26	1
Iran	1	1	0	0	20	0
Kuwait	1	1	0	0	13	3
Luxembourg	1	1	0	0	14	0
Malaysia	1	1	0	0	18	3
Mongolia	1	1	0	0	26	1
North Korea	1	1	0	0	20	3
Philippines	1	1	0	0	28	3
Total	11	10	0	1	193	21
