= Armenian Hockey League =

Ice hockey league in Armenia

- Current season, competition or edition: 2024–25 Armenian Hockey League season
- Sport: Ice hockey
- Founded: 2000
- Founder: Ice Hockey Federation of Armenia
- First season: 2000–01
- Country: Armenia
- Venue: Yerevan Figure Skating and Hockey Sports School
- Most recent champion: Ararat Yerevan (4)
- Most titles: Urartu Yerevan (8)

The Armenian Hockey League (AHL) (Armenian: Հայաստանի հոկեյի լիգա, romanized: Hayastani hokeyi liga) is the highest level of ice hockey competition in Armenia. The league was founded in 2000 and currently consists of five teams: Yerevan Lions, Sharks, Pyunik, Peppers, and Falcons.

== History ==
The first season of the league was the 2000-2001 season.

== Champions ==
Seasons include:

- 2000-2001 - ASC Yerevan
- 2001-2002 - No championship
- 2002-2003 - Dinamo Yerevan
- 2003-2004 - Dinamo Yerevan
- 2004-2005 - Dinamo Yerevan
- 2005-2006 - SKA Yerevan
- 2006-2007 - Urartu Yerevan
- 2007-2008 - Urartu Yerevan
- 2008-2009 - Urartu Yerevan
- 2009-2010 - Urartu Yerevan
- 2010-2011 - Urartu Yerevan
- 2011-2012 - Urartu Yerevan
- 2012-2013 - Ararat Yerevan
- 2013-2014 - Ararat Yerevan
- 2014-2015 - Urartu Yerevan
- 2015-2016 - Ararat Yerevan
- 2016-2017 - Ararat Yerevan
- 2017-2018 - Ararat Yerevan
- 2018-2019 - Urartu Yerevan

== See also ==
- Ice hockey by country
- Ice hockey in Armenia
- Ice Hockey Federation of Armenia
- Sport in Armenia
