= Uzbekistan Ice Hockey Federation =

Ice hockey governing body in Uzbekistan

Uzbekistan
- Association name: Uzbekistan Ice Hockey Federation
- Founded: 28 March 2018
- IIHF membership: 26 September 2019
- President: Bakhtiyor Fazilov

The Uzbekistan Ice Hockey Federation (UIHF) (Uzbek: Oʻzbekiston xokkey federatsiyasi, OXF, Ўзбекистон хоккей федерацияси, ОХФ) is the governing body of ice hockey in Uzbekistan.

== History ==
The Uzbekistan Ice Hockey Federation was founded on 28 March 2018, and was later accepted into the International Ice Hockey Federation (IIHF) on 26 September 2019, the fourth former Soviet Republic from Central Asia to join the IIHF after Kazakhstan, Kyrgyzstan and Turkmenistan. The current president of the UIHF is the Uzbek businessman Bakhtiyor Fazilov. In October 2025, they were elevated to a full member status of the IIHF.

== See also ==
- Uzbekistan Hockey League on Russian Wikipedia
- Uzbekistan national ice hockey team
- Uzbekistan men's national under-18 ice hockey team
