= Yerevan Figure Skating and Hockey Sports School =

School in Yerevan, Armenia

Coordinates: 40°09′18″N 44°27′48″E

Yerevan Figure Skating and Hockey Sports School (Armenian: Երևանի գեղասահքի և հոկեյի մարզադպրոց), is a figure skating centre and school in the Armenian capital Yerevan. The centre was opened in December 2015 and has a capacity of 538 seats. It is located on Admiral Isakov 27/10 Avenue, adjacent to the Yerevan Velodrome. The centre was named after the 10-time figure skating world champion and Russian politician Irina Rodnina. In 2019, the Yerevan City Council renamed the Irina Rodnina Figure Skating School to Yerevan Figure Skating and Hockey Sports School.

== Background ==
The first figure skating and ice hockey school in Yerevan was opened in 1971. However, the construction of the new centre was launched June 2014 and was completed in November 2015. It was financed by the Moscow-based "MonArch Group" headed by the Armenian businessman Sergei Hambardzumyan. The total construction cost was US$ 7.55 million. It was officially opened on 5 December 2015 with the presence of president Serzh Sargsyan and Irina Rodnina.

The total area of the 3-storied centre is 4,360 sq. meters, where the figure skating arena occupies 1,800 sq. meters. The seating capacity of the arena is 538 seats.

The Yerevan City Council is the owner and operator of the centre. Currently, the director of the centre is Meliné Avagyan.

In 2019, the Yerevan City Council renamed the Irina Rodnina Figure Skating School to Yerevan Figure Skating and Hockey Sports School. The bill was proposed by the Bright Alliance, which argued that Irina Rodnina participated in a pro-Azerbaijani rally in 2019, in Baku.

== See also ==
- Figure Skating Federation of Armenia
- Ice Hockey Federation of Armenia
- Ice hockey in Armenia
