= Malaysia men's national under-18 ice hockey team =

- Association: Malaysia Ice Hockey Federation
- General manager: (Malaysia) Su Fang Loh
- Head coach: (Malaysia) Khia Peng Tan
- Assistants: (Malaysia) Noor Hisham Bin Yahaya Yahaya
- Captain: Nurul Badrul Arie Versluis
- Team colors
- IIHF code: MAS

First international
- Thailand 19 – 1 Malaysia (Abu Dhabi, United Arab Emirates; 1 April 2012)

Biggest win
- Malaysia 13 – 7 Philippines (Bangkok, Thailand; 19 July 2023)

Biggest defeat
- Thailand 33 – 0 Malaysia (Tashkent, Uzbekistan; 27 April 2024)

IIHF U18 Challenge Cup of Asia
- Appearances: 1 (first in 2012)
- Best result: (2012)

International record (W–L–T)
- 2–2–0

The Malaysia men's national under-18 ice hockey team is the men's national under-18 ice hockey team of Malaysia. The team is controlled by the Malaysia Ice Hockey Federation, a member of the International Ice Hockey Federation.

== History ==
The Malaysia men's national under-18 ice hockey team played its first game in 2012 during the 2012 IIHF U18 Challenge Cup of Asia being held in Abu Dhabi, United Arab Emirates. Malaysia finished third after winning their games against Hong Kong and India but losing to Thailand and the United Arab Emirates. Their opening game of the tournament was against Thailand which they lost 1–19 was recorded as their largest ever loss in international competition.

== Roster ==
From the 2012 IIHF U18 Challenge Cup of Asia

#	Name	Pos	Date of birth
1	Shahrul Ilyas Abdul Shukor	G	28 May 1998
8	William Ang Wei Liang (A)	D	30 July 1996
7	Raz Azraai Hisham Azhar	D	29 August 1997
17	Muhammad Taufiq Azman	F	29 February 1996
30	Chua Boon Keong	G	6 January 1998
10	Jun Ming Low	F	29 August 1996
15	Aiman Zal Ariff Mohd Fadzul	F	22 February 1994
9	Aiman Zul Rafiq Mohd Fadzul	F	27 July 1997
12	Nor Haziq Fikri Nor Baharin	D	15 October 1997
16	Muhammad Syukri Shaharudin	D	11 May 1996
3	Edmund John Sibert (A)	F	12 September 1994
2	Nurul Badrul Arie Versluis (C)	F	9 August 1996
11	Ken Haniel Chin Liang Yap	D	6 February 1995

== International competitions ==
- 2012 IIHF U18 Challenge Cup of Asia. Finish: 3rd
