= Bosnia and Herzegovina men's national under-18 ice hockey team =

The Bosnia and Herzegovina men's national under-18 ice hockey team is the men's national under-18 ice hockey team of Bosnia and Herzegovina. The team is controlled by the Bosnia and Herzegovina Ice Hockey Federation, a member of the International Ice Hockey Federation. The team represents Bosnia and Herzegovina at the IIHF World U18 Championships.

== International competitions ==
=== IIHF World U18 Championships ===
- 2003: 3rd in Division III Group B
- 2004: 7th in Division III
- 2005: 2nd in Division III Qualification
