= Ice hockey in Armenia =

Ice hockey
- Country: Armenia
- Governing body: Ice Hockey Federation of Armenia
- National team(s): Men's national team; Women's national team

National competitions
- Armenian Hockey League

Ice hockey in Armenia is governed by the Ice Hockey Federation of Armenia.

== History ==
The Armenian Hockey League was founded in 2000. Armenian men's and junior national teams have participated at the IIHF World Championships. The country has been a member of the International Ice Hockey Federation since 22 September 1999.

== See also ==
- Ice hockey by country
- Sport in Armenia
- Yerevan Figure Skating and Hockey Sports School
