= Luxembourg men's national under-18 ice hockey team =

The Luxembourg men's national under-18 ice hockey team is the men's national under-18 ice hockey team of Luxembourg. The team is controlled by the Luxembourg Ice Hockey Federation, a member of the International Ice Hockey Federation. The team represents Luxembourg at the IIHF World U18 Championships.

== International competitions ==
=== IIHF European U18 Championships ===
- 1998: 8th in Group D

=== IIHF World U18 Championships ===
- 1999: 5th in Division II Europe
- 2000: 8th in Division II Europe
- 2019: 4th in Division III B
- 2022: 2nd in Division III B (Promotion to Division III A)
