= Ice Hockey Federation of Armenia =

National sports governing body

Armenia
- Association name: Ice Hockey Federation of Armenia
- IIHF membership: September 22, 1999
- President: Vahram Sargsyan
- IIHF men's ranking: 45

The Ice Hockey Federation of Armenia (Armenian: Հայաստանի հոկեյի ֆեդերացիա, romanized: Hayastani tap’oghakov hokeyi federats’ia), sometimes called the Armenian Ice Hockey Federation, is the Armenian national ice hockey federation. Its headquarters are based in Yerevan. The president, Vahram Sargsyan, is also the Chairman of the Armenian National Federation of Bandy.

== History ==
The Ice Hockey Federation of Armenia was established in 1999. The Armenian National Federation of Bandy is administered concurrently by President Vahram Sargsyan. The Federation is a full member of the Federation of International Bandy and an associate member of the International Ice Hockey Federation. The Federation organizes Armenia's participation in international hockey tournaments, as well as, training ice hockey athletes and coaches. The Federation conducts training from the Yerevan Figure Skating and Hockey Sports School. In October 2025, they were elevated to a full member status of the IIHF.

== Activities ==
The Federation directly oversees the Armenia men's national ice hockey team, the Armenia men's national junior ice hockey team, and the Armenia men's national under-18 ice hockey team.

In October 2013, the Federation signed a cooperation agreement with the Ice Hockey Federation of Russia.

== See also ==
- Armenian Hockey League
- Bandy
- Ice hockey in Armenia
- Ice hockey by country
- International Armenian Ball Hockey Association
- List of members of the International Ice Hockey Federation
- Sport in Armenia
