= Dinamo Yerevan =

Armenian sports association

Dinamo Yerevan (Armenian: Դինամո Երևան, romanized: Dinamo Yerevan) is a sports association from Yerevan, Armenia. It was founded in 1936.

The club teams include:

- FC Dinamo Yerevan - Football team
- HC Dinamo Yerevan - Hockey team

== See also ==
- Sport in Armenia
