= Urartu Yerevan =

- City: Yerevan, Armenia
- League: Armenian Hockey League
- Founded: 2005
- Website: Urartu Yerevan

Urartu Yerevan is an ice hockey team in Yerevan, Armenia. The team participates in the Armenian Hockey League.

Urartu was founded in 2005, and since then they have won all Armenian Hockey League seasons they've participated in.

== Season-by-season record ==
Season	GP	W	L	T	OTL	GF	GA	P	Results
2005-06	N/A	N/A	N/A	N/A	-	N/A	N/A	N/A	1st
2006-07	16	16	0	0	-	121	23	48	1st (Won Final)
2007-08	N/A	N/A	N/A	N/A	-	N/A	N/A	N/A	1st
2008-09	16	14	2	0	-	104	27	27	1st (Won Final)
2009-10	N/A	N/A	N/A	N/A	-	N/A	N/A	N/A	1st

== Achievements ==
- Armenian League
  - Champions (5): 2006, 2007, 2008, 2009, 2010

== See also ==
- Ice hockey in Armenia
- Ice Hockey Federation of Armenia
