= Hong Kong men's national under-18 ice hockey team =

- Hong Kong uses their national emblem as the badge on their teams' jerseys
- Association: Hong Kong, China Ice Hockey Association
- Head coach: (Hong Kong) Ng Ka-kin
- Assistants: (Hong Kong) Leung Kuen
- Captain: Christopher Wettling
- Team colors
- IIHF code: HKG

First international
- Turkey 5–2 Hong Kong (İzmit, Turkey; 13 February 2014)

Biggest win
- Hong Kong 11–0 Bulgaria (Hong Kong; 3 March 2026)

Biggest defeat
- Mexico 11–1 Hong Kong (Mexico City, Mexico; 17 March 2017)

IIHF U18 Challenge Cup of Asia
- Appearances: 1 (first in 2012)
- Best result: 5th (2012)

International record (W–L–T)
- 2–8–0

The Hong Kong men's national under-18 ice hockey team is the men's national under-18 ice hockey team of Hong Kong. The team is controlled by the Hong Kong, China Ice Hockey Association, a member of the International Ice Hockey Federation.

== History ==
The Hong Kong men's national under-18 ice hockey team played its first game in 2012 during the 2012 IIHF U18 Challenge Cup of Asia in Abu Dhabi, United Arab Emirates. Prior to the start of the tournament Hong Kong were disqualified and all of their games were declared forfeit due to problems with player eligibility. The team was allowed to play exhibition games during the tournament, however the results of the games did not count towards the standings with the scores being officially recorded as 5–0 wins to all the opposing teams. Hong Kong won all four of their exhibition games against the other teams in the tournament. The largest win was against Malaysia which they won 26–0.

== International competitions ==
- 2012 IIHF U18 Challenge Cup of Asia. Finish: 5th, officially disqualified

=== IIHF World U18 Championships ===
- 2014: 3rd in Division III Group B
- 2015: 3rd in Division III Group B
- 2016: 3rd in Division III Group B
- 2017: 2nd in Division III Group B
- 2018: 2nd in Division III Group B
- 2019: 2nd in Division III Group B
- 2020: Cancelled due to the COVID-19 pandemic
- 2021: Cancelled due to the COVID-19 pandemic
- 2022: Withdrawn
- 2023: 2nd in Division III Group B
- 2024: 1st in Division III Group B

== Roster ==
From the 2012 IIHF U18 Challenge Cup of Asia

| # | Name | Pos | Date of birth |
|---|---|---|---|
| 18 | Chow Pak Lun | D | 18 May 1995 |
| 88 | Justin Fan | F | 27 August 1997 |
| 10 | Jordan Sun Yin Ho (A) | F | 16 July 1995 |
| 41 | Lewis Shing Hei Ho | F | 20 February 1995 |
| 17 | Lau Chi Lok (A) | D | 28 December 1996 |
| 9 | Hui Yin Kenneth Leung | F | 24 November 1997 |
| 15 | Ka Chun Jason Lo | D | 7 April 1996 |
| 66 | Linus Kim Lo | F | 9 February 1997 |
| 30 | Ng Pak Woon | F | 17 April 1996 |
| 31 | Nathan Poon | F | 1 April 1994 |
| 29 | Philbert Poon | G | 9 October 1994 |
| 16 | Ching Lam Calvin So | F | 30 June 1995 |
| 19 | Justin Man Fung So | D | 12 March 1995 |
| 31 | Jeffrey Wing Cheong Tai | F | 6 September 1995 |
| 56 | Tang Cheuk Yin | F | 25 March 1996 |
| 8 | To Hei Yu | F | 18 December 1995 |
| 52 | Christopher Wettling (C) | D | 24 December 1994 |
| 23 | Wong Ka Ho | D | 23 November 1996 |
| 1 | Osbert Jie Ren Fan | G | 17 December 1996 |
