= Shengavit FC =

Shengavit
- Full name: Shengavit Football Club
- Founded: 1990; 35 years ago
- Dissolved: 2014; 11 years ago
Home colours	Away colours

Shengavit Football Club (Armenian: Շենգավիթ Ֆուտբոլային Ակումբ – Shengavit Futbolayin Akumb) was an Armenian football club from the Shengavit District of the capital Yerevan. The clubs existed between 1990 and 1993.

In 2008, the name of Shengavit was taken by Ulisses FC to become their reserve team at the Armenian First League. Shengavit as reserves of Ulisses FC, became champions of the 2008 and 2011 seasons of the Armenian First League.

== League record ==
Year	Club name	Division	Position	GP	W	D	L	GF	GA	GD	Pts
1990	Koshkagorts-Nairi	Soviet Lower Second League	8	22	7	4	11	33	53	-20	18
1991	Koshkagorts	Soviet Lower Second League	6	38	20	2	16	84	67	+17	42
1992	Shengavit	Armenian Premier League	14	22	13	5	4	53	31	+22	31
1993–2007	No Participation										
2008	Shengavit (Ulisses FC reserves)	Armenian First League	1	28	18	6	4	56	19	+37	60
2009	Shengavit (Ulisses FC reserves)	Armenian First League	2	24	16	4	4	59	32	+27	52
2010	Shengavit (Ulisses FC reserves)	Armenian First League	5	24	8	7	9	42	41	+1	31
2011	Shengavit (Ulisses FC reserves)	Armenian First League	1	24	17	2	5	53	24	+29	53
2012–13	Shengavit (Ulisses FC reserves)	Armenian First League	7	36	14	4	18	46	57	-11	46
2013–14	Shengavit (Ulisses FC reserves)	Armenian First League	6	32	9	9	14	47	59	-12	36
2014–present	No Participation										
