= 1991 IIHF European U18 Championship =

The 1991 IIHF European U18 Championship was the twenty-fourth playing of the IIHF European Junior Championships. The Soviets, playing for the last time as a unified nation, placed 2nd, and the Germans, playing for the first time as a unified nation, placed 5th (despite allowing 61 goals in 6 games).

== Group A ==
Played April 4–11 in Spišská Nová Ves and Prešov, Czechoslovakia.

=== First round ===
Group 1

Team	FIN	SWE	NOR	FRA	GF/GA	Points
1. Finland		5:2	14:0	8:0	27:2	6
2. Sweden	2:5		19:2	12:2	33:9	4
3. Norway	0:14	2:19		9:0	11:33	2
4. France	0:8	2:12	0:9		2:29	0

Group 2

Team	TCH	URS	GER	POL	GF/GA	Points
1. Czechoslovakia		3:3	7:0	13:1	23:4	5
2. Soviet Union	3:3		10:1	10:4	23:8	5
3. Germany	0:7	1:10		5:4	6:21	2
4. Poland	1:13	4:10	4:5		9:28	0

=== Final round ===
Championship round

Team	TCH	URS	FIN	SWE	GER	NOR	GF/GA	Points
1. Czechoslovakia		(3:3)	8:1	5:1	(7:0)	14:2	43:7	9
2. Soviet Union	(3:3)		5:4	5:0	(10:1)	9:1	32:9	9
3. Finland	1:8	4:5		(5:2)	15:0	(14:0)	39:21	6:
4. Sweden	1:5	0:5	(2:5)		19:3	(19:2)	41:20	4
5. Germany	(0:7)	(1:10)	0:15	3:19		9:5	13:57	2
6. Norway	2:14	1:9	(0:14)	(2:19)	6:9		11:65	0

7th place

Poland	6:2 (2:1, 2:1, 2:0)	8:3 (2:1, 3:2, 3:0)	France

France was relegated to Group B for 1992. The Soviet Union competed for the last time, Russia assumed their spot in Group A, while Latvia, Estonia, Lithuania, Belarus, and Ukraine, all began competing in Group C in 1993. Kazakhstan also began competing in 1993, but they participated in the Asian Junior Championships.

== Tournament Awards ==
- Top Scorer (Sweden) Peter Forsberg (17 points)
- Top Goalie: (Czechoslovakia) Milan Hnilicka
- Top Defenceman: (Czechoslovakia) Roman Hamrlík
- Top Forward: (Soviet Union) Alexei Kovalev

== Group B ==
Played March 23–30 in Jaca, Spain. The hosts were winless until they beat the Dutch on the final day, avoiding relegation.

=== First round ===
Group 1

Team	SUI	YUG	AUT	ESP	GF/GA	Points
1. Switzerland		5:2	6:2	6:2	17:6	6
2. Yugoslavia	2:5		6:2	8:1	16:8	4
3. Austria	2:6	2:6		6:1	10:13	2
4. Spain	2:6	1:8	1:6		4:20	0

Group 2

Team	ITA	DEN	ROM	NED	GF/GA	Points
1. Italy		3:1	9:1	4:1	16:3	6
2. Denmark	1:3		5:3	12:0	18:6	4
3. Romania	1:9	3:5		7:3	11:17	2
4. Netherlands	1:4	0:12	3:7		4:23	0

=== Final round ===
Championship round

Team	SUI	YUG	DEN	ITA	GF/GA	Points
1. Switzerland		(5:2)	8:0	9:0	22:2	6
2. Yugoslavia	(2:5)		3:5	6:4	11:14	2
3. Denmark	0:8	5:3		(1:3)	6:14	2
4. Italy	0:9	4:6	(3:1)		7:16	2

Placing round

Team	AUT	ROM	ESP	NED	GF/GA	Points
1. Austria		6:2	(6:1)	13:6	25:9	6
2. Romania	2:6		5:1	(7:3)	14:10	4
3. Spain	(1:6)	1:5		5:3	7:14	2
4. Netherlands	6:13	(3:7)	3:5		12:25	0

Switzerland was promoted to Group A and the Netherlands was relegated to Group C, for 1992.

== Group C ==
Played March 7–10, 1991 in Sofia, Bulgaria.

Team	GBR	BUL	HUN	BEL	GF/GA	Points
1. Great Britain		4:3	11:1	13:1	28:5	6
2. Bulgaria	3:4		5:4	21:1	29:9	4
3. Hungary	1:11	4:5		13:0	18:16	2
4. Belgium	1:13	1:21	0:13		2:47	0

Great Britain was promoted to Group B for 1992.
