= 1983 IIHF European U18 Championship =

The 1983 IIHF European U18 Championship was the sixteenth playing of the IIHF European Junior Championships.

== Group A ==
Played in Oslo, Norway from March 19–25, 1983.

=== First round ===
Group 1

Team	FIN	SWE	SUI	NOR	GF/GA	Points
1. Finland		4:3	10:0	12:1	26:4	6
2. Sweden	3:4		6:2	13:3	22:9	4
3. Switzerland	0:10	2:6		4:2	6:18	2
4. Norway	1:12	3:13	2:4		6:29	0

Group 2

Team	URS	TCH	FRG	FRA	GF/GA	Points
1. Soviet Union		6:3	8:0	18:4	32:7	6
2. Czechoslovakia	3:6		12:3	13:0	28:9	4
3. West Germany	0:8	3:12		5:1	8:21	2
4. France	4:18	0:13	1:5		5:36	0

=== Final round ===
Championship round

Team	URS	FIN	TCH	SWE	GF/GA	Points
1. Soviet Union		5:1	(6:3)	7:5	18:9	6
2. Finland	1:5		3:1	(4:3)	8:9	4
3. Czechoslovakia	(3:6)	1:3		4:2	8:11	2
4. Sweden	5:7	(3:4)	2:4		10:15	0

Placing round

Team	FRG	FRA	SUI	NOR	GF/GA	Points
1. West Germany		(5:1)	11:4	8:3	24:8	6
2. France	(1:5)		6:2	5:5	12:12	3
3. Switzerland	4:11	2:6		(4:2)	10:19	2
4. Norway	3:8	5:5	(2:4)		10:17	1

Norway was relegated to Group B for 1984.

== Tournament Awards ==
- Top Scorer (Soviet Union) Igor Vyazmikin (12 points)
- Top Goalie: (Finland) Jarmo Myllys
- Top Defenceman: (Czechoslovakia) Petr Svoboda
- Top Forward: (Soviet Union) Igor Vyazmikin

== Group B ==
Played in Zoetermeer, the Netherlands from March 21–27, 1983.

=== First round ===
Group 1

Team	DEN	ROM	POL	HUN	GF/GA	Points
1. Denmark		6:2	4:2	10:0	20:4	6
2. Romania	2:6		8:7	9:5	19:18	4
3. Poland	2:4	7:8		16:3	25:15	2
4. Hungary	0:10	5:9	3:16		8:35	0

Group 2

Team	NED	ITA	AUT	BUL	GF/GA	Points
1. Netherlands		5:1	6:5	7:0	18:6	6
2. Italy	1:5		8:5	5:5	14:15	3
3. Austria	5:6	5:8		7:1	17:15	2
4. Bulgaria	0:7	5:5	1:7		6:19	1

=== Final round ===
First round

Team	NED	DEN	ROM	ITA	GF/GA	Points
1. Netherlands		7:6	11:2	(5:1)	23:9	6
2. Denmark	6:7		(6:2)	8:4	20:13	4
3. Romania	2:11	(2:6)		12:4	16:21	2
4. Italy	(1:5)	4:8	4:12		9:25	0

Placing round

Team	AUT	POL	BUL	HUN	GF/GA	Points
1. Austria		8:3	(7:1)	9:5	24:9	6
2. Poland	3:8		9:1	(16:3)	28:12	4
3. Bulgaria	(1:7)	1:9		5:3	7:19	2
4. Hungary	5:9	(3:16)	3:5		11:30	0

The Netherlands was promoted to Group A and Hungary was relegated to Group C, for 1984.

== Group C ==
Played in Sarajevo, Yugoslavia from March 3–6, 1983.

Team	YUG	GBR	BEL	ESP	GF/GA	Points
1. Yugoslavia		7:4	7:3	7:3	21:10	6
2. Great Britain	4:7		7:1	2:2	13:10	3
3. Belgium	3:7	1:7		6:4	10:18	2
4. Spain	3:7	2:2	4:6		9:15	1

Yugoslavia was promoted to Group B for 1984.
