= 1986 IIHF European U18 Championship =

The 1986 IIHF European U18 Championship' was the nineteenth playing of the IIHF European Junior Championships.

== Group A ==
Played from April 3–9, in Düsseldorf, Ratingen, and Krefeld, West Germany. On the final day of the tournament, the Soviets played to a four all draw with the Swedes, leaving them in fourth place, out of the medals. In the twenty-four years that the Soviets played at the European Juniors (1968 to 1991), this is one and only time they finished out of the medals.

=== First round ===
Group 1

Team	FIN	SWE	NOR	ROM	GF/GA	Points
1. Finland		6:0	13:4	18:1	37:5	6
2. Sweden	0:6		3:3	23:1	26:10	3
3. Norway	4:13	3:3		8:5	15:21	3
4. Romania	1:18	1:23	5:8		7:49	0

Group 2

Team	TCH	URS	FRG	SUI	GF/GA	Points
1. Czechoslovakia		3:3	9:0	9:3	21:6	5
2. Soviet Union	3:3		10:1	5:2	18:6	5
3. West Germany	0:9	1:10		9:2	10:21	2
4. Switzerland	3:9	2:5	2:9		7:23	0

=== Final round ===
Championship round

Team	FIN	SWE	TCH	URS	GF/GA	Points
1. Finland		(6:0)	4:4	10:5	20:9	5
2. Sweden	(0:6)		4:3	4:4	8:13	3
3. Czechoslovakia	4:4	3:4		(3:3)	10:11	2
4. Soviet Union	5:10	4:4	(3:3)		12:17	2

Placing round

Team	FRG	SUI	NOR	ROM	GF/GA	Points
1. West Germany		(9:2)	3:2	6:3	18:7	6
2. Switzerland	(2:9)		4:2	7:2	13:13	4
3. Norway	2:3	2:4		(8:5)	12:12	2
4. Romania	3:6	2:7	(5:8)		10:21	0

Romania was relegated to Group B for 1987.

== Tournament Awards ==
- Top Scorer (Finland) Tero Toivola (17 points)
- Top Goalie: (Czechoslovakia) Radek Tóth
- Top Defenceman: (Finland) Kari Harila
- Top Forward: (Sweden) Morgan Samuelsson

== Group B ==
Played from March 16 to 22, 1986, in Aoste Italy.

=== First round ===
Group 1

Team	DEN	FRA	NED	ITA	GF/Ga	Points
1. Denmark		6:2	6:2	5:3	17:7	6
2. France	2:6		0:4	10:0	12:10	2
3. Netherlands	2:6	4:0		3:6	9:12	2
4. Italy	3:5	0:10	6:3		9:18	2

Group 2

Team	POL	BUL	YUG	AUT	GF/GA	Points
1. Poland		8:2	9:1	8:1	25:4	6
2. Bulgaria	2:8		9:5	4:2	15:15	4
3. Yugoslavia	1:9	5:9		8:3	14:21	2
4. Austria	1:8	2:4	3:8		6:20	0

=== Final round ===
Championship round

Team	POL	DEN	FRA	BUL	GF/GA	Points
1. Poland		15:3	12:2	(8:2)	35:7	6
2. Denmark	3:15		(6:2)	7:5	16:22	4
3. France	2:12	(2:6)		4:3	8:21	2
4. Bulgaria	(2:8)	5:7	3:4		10:19	0

Placing round

Team	ITA	YUG	AUT	NED	GF/GA	Points
1. Italy		5:0	2:2	(6:3)	13:5	5
2. Yugoslavia	0:5		(8:3)	8:5	16:13	4
3. Austria	2:2	(3:8)		5:3	10:13	3
4. Netherlands	(3:6)	5:8	3:5		11:19	0

Poland was promoted to Group A and the Netherlands were relegated to Group C, for 1987.

== Group C ==
Played December 28 to January 2, in Barcelona Spain.

Team	GBR	HUN	ESP	GF/GA	Points
1. Great Britain		3:4; 3:1	5:3; 6:3	17:11	6
2. Hungary	4:3; 1:3		1:4; 3:2	9:12	4
3. Spain	3:5; 3:6	4:1; 2:3		12:15	2

Great Britain was promoted to Group B for 1987.
