= 1987 IIHF European U18 Championship =

International ice hockey tournament

The 1987 IIHF European U18 Championship was the twentieth playing of the IIHF European Junior Championships.

== Group A ==
Played April 3–12, 1987, in Tampere, Kouvola, and Hämeenlinna, Finland. Sweden, Czechoslovakia, and the Soviet Union, finished tied atop the standings after seven games. Amongst the three, Sweden had the better goal differential in their head to head games, so they won the gold. The Czech's and Soviets still remained even, so the silver medal was awarded based on goals scored in the head to head games: six to four in favor of Czechoslovakia.

Team	SWE	TCH	URS	FIN	SUI	POL	NOR	FRG	GF/GA	Points	Tie 1 H2H Points	Tie 2 H2H GD	Tie 3 H2H GF
1. Sweden		4:1	0:1	5:2	14:1	13:0	6:0	9:0	51:5	12	2	+2	
2. Czechoslovakia	1:4		5:3	8:5	13:3	11:0	5:1	5:0	48:16	12	2	-1	6
3. Soviet Union	1:0	3:5		6:5	8:0	11:1	9:3	5:2	43:16	12	2	-1	4
4. Finland	2:5	5:8	5:6		4:0	9:0	9:0	7:2	41:21	8			
5. Switzerland	1:14	3:13	0:8	0:4		5:5	1:1	4:1	14:46	4			
6. Poland	0:13	0:11	1:11	0:9	5:5		3:2	4:4	13:55	4			
7. Norway	0:6	1:5	3:9	0:9	1:1	2:3		6:4	13:37	3			
8. West Germany	0:9	0:5	2:5	2:7	1:4	4:4	4:6		13:40	1			

West Germany was relegated to Group B for 1988.

== Tournament Awards ==
- Top Scorer (Czechoslovakia) Roman Horák (15 points)
- Top Goalie: (Sweden) Tommy Söderström
- Top Defenceman: (Soviet Union) Alexander Godynyuk
- Top Forward: (Czechoslovakia) Roman Horák

== Group B ==
Played April 3–9, 1987, in Bucharest, Romania

=== First round ===
Group 1

Team	ROM	ITA	GBR	BUL	GF/Ga	Points
1. Romania		6:3	13:2	2:4	19:5	4
2. Italy	3:6		6:1	4:2	9:7	2
3. Great Britain	2:13	1:6		2:9	3:19	0
NR Bulgaria	4:2	2:4	9:2		15:8	4

- Bulgaria would have been second in their group but they were disqualified for falsifying birthdates for some of their players. Their games did not count in the standings and they received no official ranking.

Group 2

Team	DEN	FRA	YUG	AUT	GF/GA	Points	Tie 1 H2H Points	Tie 2 H2H GD
1. Denmark		8:3	4:6	6:0	18:9	4	2	+3
2. France	3:8		8:4	3:2	14:14	4	2	-1
3. Yugoslavia	6:4	4:8		7:2	17:14	4	2	-2
4. Austria	0:6	2:3	2:7		4:16	0		

=== Final round ===
Championship round

Team	ROM	DEN	ITA	FRA	GF/GA	Points
1. Romania		7:4	(6:3)	6:4	19:11	6
2. Denmark	4:7		5:3	(8:3)	17:13	4
3. Italy	(3:6)	3:5		5:2	11:13	2
4. France	4:6	(3:8)	2:5		9:19	0

Placing round

Team	YUG	AUT	GBR	BUL	GF/GA	Points
1. Yugoslavia		(7:2)	7:2	–:–	14:4	4
2. Austria	(2:7)		5:4	–:–	7:11	2
3. Great Britain	2:7	4:5		(–:–)	6:12	0
NR Bulgaria	–:–	–:–	(–:–)		–:–	–

Romania was promoted to Group A and Bulgaria was relegated to Group C, for 1988.

== Group C ==
Played March 14–19, 1987, in Zoetermeer, the Netherlands.

Team	NED	HUN	BEL	GF	GA
1. Netherlands		8:3; 6:2	9:1; 9:1	32:7	8
2. Hungary	3:8; 2:6		10:3; 5:1	20:18	4
3. Belgium	1:9; 1:9	3:10; 1:5		6:33	0

The Netherlands was promoted to Group B for 1988.
