= 1980 IIHF European U18 Championship =

The 1980 IIHF European U18 Championship was the thirteenth playing of the IIHF European Junior Championships.

== Group A ==
Played in Hradec Králové, Czechoslovakia from April 1–7, 1980.

=== First round ===
Group 1

Team	TCH	SWE	POL	NOR	GF/GA	Points
1. Czechoslovakia		7:1	9:2	11:3	27:6	6
2. Sweden	1:7		7:2	9:0	17:9	4
3. Poland	2:9	2:7		6:4	10:20	2
4. Norway	3:11	0:9	4:6		7:26	0

Group 2

Team	URS	FIN	FRG	SUI	GF/GA	Points
1. Soviet Union		9:2	12:3	13:1	34:6	6
2. Finland	2:9		9:3	5:2	16:14	4
3. West Germany	3:12	3:9		4:3	10:24	2
4. Switzerland	1:13	2:5	3:4		6:22	0

=== Final round ===
Championship round

Team	URS	TCH	SWE	FIN	GF/GA	Points
1. Soviet Union		3:2	5:1	(9:2)	17:5	6
2. Czechoslovakia	2:3		(7:1)	6:3	15:7	4
3. Sweden	1:5	(1:7)		3:1	5:13	2
4. Finland	(2:9)	3:6	1:3		6:18	0

Placing round

Team	FRG	POL	SUI	NOR	GF/GA	Points
1. West Germany		8:3	(4:3)	8:3	20:9	6
2. Poland	3:8		5:2	(6:4)	14:14	4
3. Switzerland	(3:4)	2:5		8:3	13:12	2
4. Norway	3:8	(4:6)	3:8		10:22	0

Norway was relegated to Group B for 1981.

== Tournament Awards ==
- Top Scorer: (Soviet Union) Sergei Yashin (14 Points)
- Top Goalie: (Czechoslovakia) Jirí Steklík
- Top Defenceman: (Sweden) Peter Andersson
- Top Forward: (Soviet Union) Sergei Yashin

== Group B ==
Played in Jesenice, Yugoslavia from March 4–8, 1980.

=== First round ===
Group 1

Team	AUT	ROM	FRA	NED	GF/GA	Points
1. Austria		6:5	7:6	6:1	19:12	6
2. Romania	5:6		5:4	10:2	20:12	4
3. France	6:7	4:5		7:6	17:18	2
4. Netherlands	1:6	2:10	6:7		9:23	0

Group 2

Team	YUG	BUL	ITA	HUN	GF/GA	Points
1. Yugoslavia		7:6	3:3	7:5	27:14	5
2. Bulgaria	6:7		4:2	10:4	20:13	4
3. Italy	3:3	2:4		7:6	12:13	3
4. Hungary	5:7	4:10	6:7		15:24	0

=== Placing round ===
7th place	Hungary	11:3 (2:1, 5:0, 4:2)	Netherlands
5th place	France	6:3 (2:1, 2:2, 2:0)	Italy
3rd place	Bulgaria	4:2 (2:1, 0:0, 2:1)	Romania
Final	Austria	4:1 (1:1, 2:0, 1:0)	Yugoslavia

Austria was promoted to Group A, and the Netherlands was relegated to Group C, for 1981.

== Group C ==
Played in Frederikshavn, Denmark from March 29 to April 3, 1980.

Team	DEN	BEL	GBR	GF/GA	Points
1. Denmark		11:2; 10:0	17:2; 13:1	51:5	8
2. Belgium	2:11; 0:10		4:1; 7:8	13:30	2
3. Great Britain	2:17; 1:13	1:4; 8:7		12:41	2

Denmark was promoted to Group B for 1981.
