= 1984 IIHF European U18 Championship =

The 1984 IIHF European U18 Championship was the seventeenth playing of the IIHF European Junior Championships.

== Group A ==
Played in Rosenheim, Garmisch-Partenkirchen, Füssen and Bad Tölz, Bavaria, West Germany, from April 7–13, 1984.

=== First round ===
Group 1

Team	URS	SWE	FRG	NED	GF/GA	Points
1. Soviet Union		7:4	9:3	21:0	37:7	6
2. Sweden	4:7		11:0	18:0	33:7	4
3. West Germany	3:9	0:11		12:4	15:24	2
4. Netherlands	0:21	0:18	4:12		4:51	0

Group 2

Team	TCH	FIN	SUI	FRA	GF/GA	Points
1. Czechoslovakia		3:2	13:0	13:1	29:3	6
2. Finland	2:3		8:3	4:1	14:7	4
3. Switzerland	0:13	3:8		5:2	8:23	2
4. France	1:13	1:4	2:5		4:22	0

=== Final round ===
Championship round

Team	URS	TCH	SWE	FIN	GF/GA	Points
1. Soviet Union		4:2	(7:4)	9:2	20:8	6
2. Czechoslovakia	2:4		4:2	(3:2)	9:8	4
3. Sweden	(4:7)	2:4		6:2	12:13	2
4. Finland	2:9	(2:3)	2:6		6:18	0

Placing round

Team	FRG	SUI	FRA	NED	GF/GA	Points
1. West Germany		8:7	6:2	(12:4)	26:13	6
2. Switzerland	7:8		(5:2)	8:3	20:13	4
3. France	2:6	(2:5)		5:2	9:13	2
4. Netherlands	(4:12)	3:8	2:5		9:25	0

The Netherlands were relegated to Group B for 1985.

== Tournament Awards ==
- Top Scorer (Soviet Union) Igor Vyazmikin (16 points)
- Top Goalie: (Czechoslovakia) Jaroslav Landsmann
- Top Defenceman: (Soviet Union) Mikhail Tatarinov
- Top Forward: (Soviet Union) Alexander Semak

== Group B ==
Played in Herning, Denmark, from March 26 to April 1, 1984.

=== First round ===
Group 1

Team	NOR	AUT	YUG	ITA	GF/GA	Points
1. Norway		6:3	10:1	4:4	20:8	5
2. Austria	3:6		6:5	7:4	16:15	4
3. Yugoslavia	1:10	5:6		4:3	10:19	2
4. Italy	4:4	4:7	3:4		11:15	1

Group 2

Team	POL	ROM	DEN	BUL	GF/GA	Points
1. Poland		15:5	4:2	4:1	23:8	6
2. Romania	5:15		10:3	9:6	24:24	4
3. Denmark	2:4	3:10		7:3	12:17	2
4. Bulgaria	1:4	6:9	3:7		10:20	0

=== Final round ===
Championship round

Team	NOR	POL	AUT	ROM	GF/GA	Points
1. Norway		4:3	(6:3)	6:1	16:7	6
2. Poland	3:4		9:3	(15:5)	27:12	4
3. Austria	(3:6)	3:9		7:6	13:21	2
4. Romania	1:6	(5:15)	6:7		12:28	0

Placing round

Team	DEN	BUL	YUG	ITA	GF/GA	Points
1. Denmark		(7:3)	8:4	11:2	26:9	6
2. Bulgaria	(3:7)		4:3	3:3	10:13	3
3. Yugoslavia	4:8	3:4		(4:3)	11:15	2
4. Italy	2:11	3:3	(3:4)		8:18	1

Norway was promoted to Group A and Italy was relegated to Group C, for 1985.

== Group C ==
Played in Edinburgh and Kirkcaldy, Scotland, United Kingdom from April 21–27, 1984.

Team	HUN	GBR	BEL	ESP	GF/GA	Points
1. Hungary		11:5; 3:9	6:5; 6:3	10:2; 8:4	44:28	10
2. Great Britain	5:11; 9:3		4:8; 10:5	11:4; 6:3	45:34	8
3. Belgium	5:6; 3:6	8:4; 5:10		10:2; 8:2	39:30	6
4. Spain	2:10; 4:8	4:11; 3:6	2:10; 2:8		17:53	0

Hungary was promoted to Group B for 1985.
