= 1974 IIHF European U19 Championship =

The 1974 IIHF European U19 Championship was the seventh playing of the IIHF European Junior Championships.

== Group A ==
Played in Herisau, Switzerland, from March 22–30, 1974.

Team	SWE	URS	FIN	TCH	POL	SUI	GF/GA	Points
1. Sweden		4:1	5:2	11:2	15:3	21:1	56:9	10
2. Soviet Union	1:4		12:3	8:1	10:2	14:1	45:11	8
3. Finland	2:5	3:12		3:2	9:2	6:4	23:25	6
4. Czechoslovakia	2:11	1:8	2:3		7:3	15:1	27:26	4
5. Poland	3:15	2:10	2:9	3:7		5:3	15:44	2
6. Switzerland	1:21	1:14	4:6	1:15	3:5		10:61	0

Switzerland was relegated to Group B for 1975.

== Tournament Awards ==
- Top Scorer: (Sweden) Kent Nilsson (16 Points)
- Top Goalie: (Sweden) Åke Andersson
- Top Defenceman: (Czechoslovakia) Vladislav Vlček
- Top Forward: (Sweden) Thomas Gradin

== Group B ==
Played in Bucharest, Romania from March 9–20, 1974

=== First round ===
Group 1

Team	FRG	NOR	YUG	FRA	HUN	GF/GA	Points
1. West Germany		8:1	10:2	15:1	15:0	48:4	8
2. Norway	1:8		8:3	8:1	3:0	20:12	6
3. Yugoslavia	2:10	3:8		5:5	8:4	18:27	3
4. France	1:15	1:8	5:5		7:5	14:33	3
5. Hungary	0:15	0:3	4:8	5:7		9:33	0

Group 2

Team	ROM	BUL	DEN	AUT	ITA	GF/GA	Points
1. Romania		6:1	15:2	8:7	6:0	35:10	8
2. Bulgaria	1:6		5:5	12:0	7:1	25:12	5
3. Denmark	2:15	5:5		4:0	6:5	17:25	5
4. Austria	7:8	0:12	0:4		7:4	14:28	2
5. Italy	0:6	1:7	5:6	4:7		10:26	0

=== Placing round ===
9th place	Hungary	6:1 (1:0, 3:0, 2:1)	Italy
7th place	Austria	5:3 (3:2, 2:0, 0:1)	France
5th place	Denmark	5:3 (0:0, 2:2, 3:1)	Yugoslavia
3rd place	Bulgaria	8:2 (2:1, 2:0, 4:1)	Norway
Final	West Germany	10:3 (2:0, 4:1, 4:2)	Romania

West Germany was promoted to Group A for 1975.
