= 1975 IIHF European U19 Championship =

The 1975 IIHF European U19 Championship was the eighth playing of the IIHF European Junior Championships.

== Group A ==
Played in Grenoble, France from March 21–30, 1975.

Team	URS	TCH	SWE	FIN	POL	FRG	GF/GA	Points	Tie 1 H2H Points	Tie 2 H2H GD
1. Soviet Union		3:4	8:0	4:1	10:2	7:1	32:8	8	2	+7
2. Czechoslovakia	4:3		3:4	3:1	7:1	8:4	25:13	8	2	0
3. Sweden	0:8	4:3		6:1	11:2	15:3	36:17	8	2	-7
4. Finland	1:4	1:3	1:6		4:3	3:3	10:19	3		
5. Poland	2:10	1:7	2:11	3:4		6:2	14:34	2		
6. West Germany	1:7	4:8	3:15	3:3	2:6		13:39	1		

No team was relegated as it was decided to expand Group A from six to eight nations.

== Tournament Awards ==
- Top Scorer: (Sweden) Kent Nilsson (10 Points)
- Top Goalie: (Soviet Union) Sergei Babiriko
- Top Defenceman: (Sweden) Bjorn Johansson
- Top Forward: (Czechoslovakia) Karel Holý

== Group B ==
Played in Herisau, Switzerland, from March 15–22, 1975.

=== First round ===
Group 1

Team	SUI	YUG	DEN	AUT	GF/GA	Points
1. Switzerland		16:3	13:1	9:1	38:5	6
2. Yugoslavia	3:16		7:0	4:4	14:20	3
3. Denmark	1:13	0:7		10:1	11:21	2
4. Austria	1:9	4:4	1:10		6:23	1

Group 2

Team	BUL	ROM	NOR	FRA	GF/GA	Points
1. Bulgaria		5:5	5:1	10:3	20:9	5
2. Romania	5:5		4:4	5:5	14:14	3
3. Norway	1:5	4:4		4:3	9:12	3
4. France	3:10	5:5	3:4		11:19	1

=== Placing round ===
7th place	Austria	7:4 (2:1, 2:0, 3:3)	France
5th place	Norway	3:1 (2:1, 0:0, 1:0)	Denmark
3rd place	Yugoslavia	4:3 (0:1, 3:1, 1:1)	Romania
Final	Switzerland	7:6 (4:0, 2:4, 1:2)	Bulgaria

Both Switzerland and Bulgaria were promoted to Group A for 1976.
