= 1985 IIHF European U18 Championship =

The 1985 IIHF European U18 Championship was the eighteenth playing of the IIHF European Junior Championships.

== Group A ==
Played April 1–7, 1985, in Anglet France. For the first time, a nation other than the USSR, Czechoslovakia, Sweden, and Finland, finished in the top four. Norway defeated Finland three to two, and then hung on to tie the Germans five to five, earning them second in group 1 and an opportunity to play for their first medal. It would take another ten years for another nation to break through the four team monopoly, with the Germans placing 2nd in 1995.

=== First round ===
Group 1

Team	URS	NOR	FIN	FRG	GF/GA	Pkt.
1. Soviet Union		5:1	6:0	6:1	17:2	6
2. Norway	1:5		3:2	5:5	9:12	3
3. Finland	0:6	2:3		4:2	6:11	2
4. West Germany	1:6	5:5	2:4		8:15	1

Group 2

Team	SWE	TCH	SUI	FRA	GF/GA	Points
1. Sweden		5:3	7:1	15:0	27:4	6
2. Czechoslovakia	3:5		8:2	15:3	26:10	4
3. Switzerland	1:7	2:8		4:2	7:17	2
4. France	0:15	3:15	2:4		5:34	0

=== Final round ===
Championship round

Team	SWE	URS	TCH	NOR	GF/GA	Points
1. Sweden		1:1	(5:3)	11:0	17:4	5
2. Soviet Union	1:1		3:2	(5:1)	9:4	5
3. Czechoslovakia	(3:5)	2:3		8:2	13:10	2
4. Norway	0:11	(1:5)	2:8		3:24	0

Placing round

Team	FIN	FRG	SUI	FRA	GF/GA	Points
1. Finland		(4:2)	7:7	21:5	32:14	5
2. West Germany	(2:4)		2:1	10:0	14:5	4
3. Switzerland	7:7	1:2		(4:2)	12:11	3
4. France	5:21	0:10	(2:4)		7:35	0

France was relegated to Group B for 1986.

== Tournament Awards ==
- Top Scorer (Finland) Sami Wahlsten (13 points)
- Top Goalie: (Soviet Union) Artūrs Irbe
- Top Defenceman: (Czechoslovakia) Rudolf Záruba
- Top Forward: (Sweden) Ulf Dahlén

== Group B ==
Played March 24–30, 1985, in Sofia Bulgaria

=== First round ===
Group 1

Team	ROM	NED	DEN	HUN	GF/GA	Points
1. Romania		8:2	3:0	9:1	20:3	6
2. Netherlands	2:8		7:5	4:3	13:16	4
3. Denmark	0:3	5:7		9:5	14:15	2
4. Hungary	1:9	3:4	5:9		9:22	0

Group 2

Team	POL	BUL	AUT	YUG	GF/GA	Points
1. Poland		4:3	6:3	7:3	17:9	6
2. Bulgaria	3:4		7:2	5:4	14:10	4
3. Austria	3:6	2:7		6:1	11:14	2
4. Yugoslavia	3:7	4:5	1:6		8:18	0

=== Final round ===
Championship round

Team	ROM	POL	BUL	NED	GF/GA	Points
1. Romania		4:3	5:4	(8:2)	17:9	6
2. Poland	3:4		(4:3)	7:3	14:10	4
3. Bulgaria	4:5	(3:4)		4:3	11:12	2
4. Netherlands	(2:8)	3:7	3:4		8:19	0

Placing round

Team	DEN	AUT	YUG	HUN	GF/GA	Points
1. Denmark		5:4	6:5	(9:5)	20:14	6
2. Austria	4:5		(6:1)	5:2	15:8	4
3. Yugoslavia	5:6	(1:6)		3:1	9:13	2
4. Hungary	(5:9)	2:5	1:3		8:17	0

Romania was promoted to Group A and Hungary was relegated to Group C, for 1986.

== Group C ==
Played in Brixen Italy, from March 19–24, 1985.

Team	ITA	BEL	GBR	GF/GA	Points
1. Italy		4:0; 3:2	8:4; 5:8	20:14	6
2. Belgium	0:4; 2:3		5:2; 7:3	14:12	4
3. Great Britain	4:8; 8:5	2:5; 3:7		17:25	2

Italy was promoted to Group B for 1986.
