= 1979 IIHF European U18 Championship =

The 1979 IIHF European U18 Championship was the twelfth playing of the IIHF European Junior Championships.

== Group A ==
Played in Tychy and Katowice, Poland from March 31 to April 6, 1979.

=== First round ===
Group 1

| Team | TCH | FIN | POL | ITA | GF/GA | Points |
|---|---|---|---|---|---|---|
| 1. Czechoslovakia | | 5:1 | 3:0 | 17:0 | 25:1 | 6 |
| 2. Finland | 1:5 | | 5:2 | 28:0 | 34:7 | 4 |
| 3. Poland | 0:3 | 2:5 | | 8:0 | 10:8 | 2 |
| 4. Italy | 0:17 | 0:28 | 0:8 | | 0:53 | 0 |

Group 2

| Team | URS | SWE | SUI | FRG | GF/GA | Points |
|---|---|---|---|---|---|---|
| 1. Soviet Union | | 3:1 | 5:1 | 12:1 | 20:3 | 6 |
| 2. Sweden | 1:3 | | 6:2 | 10:1 | 17:6 | 4 |
| 3. Switzerland | 1:5 | 2:6 | | 6:5 | 9:16 | 2 |
| 4. West Germany | 1:12 | 1:10 | 5:6 | | 7:28 | 0 |

=== Final round ===
Championship round

| Team | TCH | FIN | URS | SWE | GF/GA | Points |
|---|---|---|---|---|---|---|
| 1. Czechoslovakia | | (5:1) | 5:4 | 3:2 | 13:7 | 6 |
| 2. Finland | (1:5) | | 3:1 | 8:0 | 12:6 | 4 |
| 3. Soviet Union | 4:5 | 1:3 | | (3:1) | 8:9 | 2 |
| 4. Sweden | 2:3 | 0:8 | (1:3) | | 3:14 | 0 |

Placing round

| Team | POL | SUI | FRG | ITA | GF/GA | Points |
|---|---|---|---|---|---|---|
| 1. Poland | | 5:3 | 4:1 | (8:0) | 17:4 | 6 |
| 2. Switzerland | 3:5 | | (6:5) | 9:0 | 18:10 | 4 |
| 3. West Germany | 1:4 | (5:6) | | 6:0 | 12:10 | 2 |
| 4. Italy | (0:8) | 0:9 | 0:6 | | 0:23 | 0 |

Italy was relegated to Group B for 1980.

== Tournament Awards ==
- Top Scorer: (Finland) Jose Pekkala (13 Points)
- Top Goalie: (Poland) Paweł Łukaszka
- Top Defenceman: (Finland) Timo Blomqvist
- Top Forward: (Czechoslovakia) Jan Ludvig

== Group B ==
Played in Miercurea Ciuc, Romania from March 4–8, 1979.

=== First round ===
Group 1

| Team | NOR | YUG | HUN | AUT | GF/GA | Points |
|---|---|---|---|---|---|---|
| 1. Norway | | 7:0 | 4:1 | 5:1 | 16:2 | 6 |
| 2. Yugoslavia | 0:7 | | 5:2 | 6:3 | 11:12 | 4 |
| 3. Hungary | 1:4 | 2:5 | | 8:8 | 11:17 | 1 |
| 4. Austria | 1:5 | 3:6 | 8:8 | | 12:19 | 1 |

Group 2

| Team | ROM | FRA | NED | DEN | GF/GA | Points |
|---|---|---|---|---|---|---|
| 1. Romania | | 5:1 | 9:2 | 12:1 | 26:4 | 6 |
| 2. France | 1:5 | | 4:1 | 6:1 | 11:7 | 4 |
| 3. Netherlands | 2:9 | 1:4 | | 8:2 | 11:17 | 2 |
| 4. Denmark | 1:12 | 1:6 | 2:8 | | 4:26 | 0 |

=== Placing round ===
| 7th place | Austria | 7:1 (2:0, 1:0, 4:0) | Denmark |
| 5th place | Netherlands | 8:4 (4:0, 3:2, 1:2) | Hungary |
| '3rd place | Yugoslavia | 5:4 (0:2, 4:2, 1:0) | France |
| Final | Norway | 5:3 (2:1, 1:0, 2:2) | Romania |

Norway was promoted to Group A, and Denmark was relegated to Group C, for 1980.

== Group C ==
Played in Sofia, Bulgaria from March 1–6, 1979.

| Team | BUL | ESP | GBR | GF/GA | Points |
|---|---|---|---|---|---|
| 1. Bulgaria | | 12:3; 6:2 | 10:0; 5:1 | 33:6 | 8 |
| 2. Spain | 3:12; 2:6 | | 5:4; 6:1 | 16:23 | 4 |
| 3. Great Britain | 0:10; 1:5 | 4:5; 1:6 | | 6:26 | 0 |

Bulgaria was promoted to Group B for 1980.
