= 1981 IIHF European U18 Championship =

The 1981 IIHF European U18 Championship was the fourteenth playing of the IIHF European Junior Championships.

== Group A ==
Played in Minsk, Belorussian SSR, USSR from April 2–8, 1981.

=== First round ===
Group 1

Team	TCH	SWE	SUI	POL	GF/GA	Points
1. Czechoslovakia		4:4	13:0	21:0	38:4	5
2. Sweden	4:4		9:2	20:3	33:9	5
3. Switzerland	0:13	2:9		7:2	9:24	2
4. Poland	0:21	3:20	2:7		5:48	0

Group 2

Team	URS	FIN	FRG	AUT	GF/GA	Points
1. Soviet Union		9:2	17:2	17:0	43:4	6
2. Finland	2:9		10:1	10:2	22:12	4
3. West Germany	2:17	1:10		2:0	5:27	2
4. Austria	0:17	2:10	0:2		2:29	0

=== Final round ===
Championship round

Team	URS	TCH	SWE	FIN	GF/GA	Points
1. Soviet Union		3:3	10:1	(9:2)	22:6	5
2. Czechoslovakia	3:3		(4:4)	4:3	11:10	4
3. Sweden	1:10	(4:4)		5:1	10:15	3
4. Finland	(2:9)	3:4	1:5		6:18	0

Placing round

Team	SUI	POL	FRG	AUT	GF/GA	Points
1. Switzerland		(7:2)	2:2	7:2	16:6	5
2. Poland	(2:7)		4:2	4:0	10:9	4
3. West Germany	2:2	2:4		(2:0)	6:6	3
4. Austria	2:7	0:4	(0:2)		2:13	0

Austria was relegated to Group B for 1982.

== Tournament Awards ==
- Top Scorer: (Soviet Union) Oleg Znarok and (Czechoslovakia) Vladimír Růžička (16 points)
- Top Goalie: (Sweden) Jakob Gustavsson
- Top Defenceman: (Czechoslovakia) Antonín Stavjaňa
- Top Forward: (Soviet Union) Leonid Trukhno

== Group B ==
Played in Miercurea Ciuc Romania from March 15–21, 1981.

=== First round ===
Group 1

Team	FRA	NOR	ROM	DEN	GF/GA	Points
1. France		4:2	4:3	11:4	19:9	6
2. Norway	2:4		11:2	8:3	21:9	4
3. Romania	3:4	2:11		7:5	12:20	2
4. Denmark	4:11	3:8	5:7		12:26	0

Group 2

Team	YUG	ITA	BUL	HUN	GF/GA	Points
1. Yugoslavia		5:4	9:4	5:1	19:9	6
2. Italy	4:5		8:3	6:3	18:11	4
3. Bulgaria	4:9	3:8		13:2	20:19	2
4. Hungary	1:5	3:6	2:13		6:24	0

=== Final round ===
Championship round

Team	FRA	NOR	YUG	ITA	GF/GA	Points
1. France		(4:2)	5:2	4:3	13:7	6
2. Norway	(2:4)		7:1	6:2	15:7	4
3. Yugoslavia	2:5	1:7		(5:4)	8:16	2
4. Italy	3:4	2:6	(4:5)		9:15	0

Placing round

Team	ROM	DEN	BUL	HUN	GF/GA	Points
1. Romania		(7:5)	11:0	12:3	30:8	6
2. Denmark	(5:7)		7:2	25:1	37:10	4
3. Bulgaria	0:11	2:7		(13:2)	15:20	2
4. Hungary	3:12	1:25	(2:13)		6:50	0

France was promoted to Group A, and Hungary was demoted to group C, for 1982.

== Group C ==
Played in Belgium and the Netherlands from March 19–24, 1981.

Team	NED	GBR	BEL	GF/GA	Points
1. Netherlands		13:1; 13:1	9:1; 14:2	49:5	8
2. Great Britain	1:13; 1:13		9:1; 4:4	15:31	3
3. Belgium	1:9; 2:14	1:9; 4:4		8:36	1

The Netherlands were promoted to Group B for 1982.
