= 1978 IIHF European U18 Championship =

The 1978 IIHF European U18 Championship was the eleventh playing of the IIHF European Junior Championships. This year's tournaments offered spectacular finishes in both Group A and Group B. In Group B's championship game, the Italians led with three minutes to play before the French tied it at two. Overtime was played in two five-minute halves, both teams scored once, and finally team Italy won in a shootout.

As great as that was, it still did not compare to the drama that Alpo Suhonen's Finnish team provided in winning Group A. Coming into the final game on January 2 in Helsinki, both Finland and the USSR had won all four previous games. Additionally, in the games that counted in the round robin final, they had both won by a combined total of eight to three. Coming into their last game, since a tie could not be settled by any rule, they would have to play overtime. It was decided that if there was a tie, they would play one full period, and then the second period (if still needed) would be sudden death." Tom Ratschunas, writing for "Total Hockey", stated that, "The overtime stage of the game with the Soviets is still the mother of all extended playing time in Finnish hockey." The Finns tied the game at three with just a few minutes left in regulation. Twice they tied it up in the first overtime, the second goal coming with just twenty seconds left. Just one minute and forty-two seconds into the second overtime, Jari Kurri scored on Dmitri Saprykhin to make the hosts victorious. An interesting side note to the Finnish triumph was that they played without their top defenceman, Reijo Ruotsalainen because he was chosen to play in the World Juniors, which were unfortunately played at the same time in Montreal.

== Group A ==
Played in Helsinki and Vantaa, Finland from December 27, 1977, to January 2, 1978.

=== First round ===
Group 1

Team	FIN	SWE	SUI	NOR	GF/GA	Points
1. Finland		2:1	10:7	11:1	23:9	6
2. Sweden	1:2		7:2	14:0	22:4	4
3. Switzerland	7:10	2:7		6:5	15:22	2
4. Norway	1:11	0:14	5:6		6:31	0

Group 2

Team	URS	TCH	POL	FRG	GF/GA	Points
1. Soviet Union		3:0	8:1	13:1	24:2	6
2. Czechoslovakia	0:3		8:2	13:1	21:6	4
3. Poland	1:8	2:8		5:3	8:19	2
4. West Germany	1:13	1:13	3:5		5:32	0

=== Final round ===
Championship round

Team	FIN	URS	SWE	TCH	GF/GA	Points
1. Finland		6:5 2o.t.	(2:1)	6:2	14:8	6
2. Soviet Union	5:6 2o.t.		5:3	(3:0)	13:9	4
3. Sweden	(1:2)	3:5		4:2	8:9	2
4. Czechoslovakia	2:6	(0:3)	2:4		4:13	0

=== Final Game Summary ===
January 2, 1978	Soviet Union	5 – 6 2ot (2–1, 1–1, 0–1, 2–2, 0–1)	Finland	Ice Hall, Helsinki; Attendance: 7 604

Shashov 4:32; Funikov 12:57; Funikov 37:12; Popikhin 73:53; Popikhin 78:17 / Goals / 19:59 Kurri; 39:09 Lepistö; 46:43 Huikari; 76:46 Laine; 79:49 Huikari; 81:42 Kurri

Placing round

Team	POL	SUI	FRG	NOR	GF/GA	Points
1. Poland		4:3	(5:3)	6:3	15:9	6
2. Switzerland	3:4		10:7	(6:5)	19:16	4
3. West Germany	(3:5)	7:10		2:1	12:16	2
4. Norway	3:6	(5:6)	1:2		9:14	0

Norway was relegated to Group B for 1979.

== Tournament Awards ==
- Top Scorer: (Switzerland) Henri Loher (15 Points)
- Top Goalie: (Finland) Jari Paavola
- Top Defenceman: (Soviet Union) Yevgeni Popikhin
- Top Forward: (Finland) Jari Kurri

== Group B ==
Played from March 1–5, 1978.

=== First round ===
Group 1

Played in Den Bosch, Netherlands.

Team	ITA	YUG	NED	DEN	GF/GA	Points
1. Italy		3:2	5:4	6:7	14:13	4
2. Yugoslavia	2:3		4:2	3:1	9:6	4
3. Netherlands	4:5	2:4		2:0	8:9	2
4. Denmark	7:6	1:3	0:2		8:11	2

Group 2

Played in Deurne, Belgium

Team	FRA	ROM	AUT	BEL	GF/GA	Points
1. France		4:4	6:1	10:1	20:8	5
2. Romania	4:4		5:5	12:1	21:10	4
3. Austria	1:6	5:5		16:0	22:11	3
4. Belgium	1:10	1:12	0:16		2:38	0

=== Placing round ===
7th place	Denmark	15:2 (5:1, 5:0, 5:1)	Belgium
5th place	Austria	5:3 (0:1, 0:0, 5:2)	Netherlands
3rd place	Romania	7:5 o.t. (1:2, 3:2, 1:1, 2:0)	Yugoslavia
Final	Italy	4:3 s.o. (0:0, 2:1, 0:1, 1:1, 1:0)	France

Italy was promoted to Group A, and Belgium was relegated to Group C, for 1979.

== Group C ==
Played in Sofia Bulgaria from January 20–26, 1979.

Team	HUN	BUL	ESP	GF/GA	Points
1. Hungary		2:2; 6:5	8:1; 5:5	21:13	6:2
2. Bulgaria	2:2; 5:6		9:2; 1:3	17:13	3:5
3. Spain	1:8; 5:5	2:9; 3:1		11:23	3:5

Hungary was promoted to Group B for 1979.
