= 1973 IIHF European U19 Championship =

Ice hockey tournament

The 1973 IIHF European U19 Championship was the sixth playing of the IIHF European Junior Championships.

== Group A ==
Played in Leningrad, USSR, from March 20–27, 1973.

Team	URS	SWE	TCH	FIN	SUI	FRG	GF/GA	Points
1. Soviet Union		6:2	8:2	13:0	10:2	16:2	53:8	10
2. Sweden	2:6		3:3	16:2	15:2	9:3	45:16	7
3. Czechoslovakia	2:8	3:3		3:2	12:3	7:3	27:19	7
4. Finland	0:13	2:16	2:3		7:0	7:3	18:35	4
5. Switzerland	2:10	2:15	3:12	0:7		5:3	12:47	2
6. West Germany	2:16	3:9	3:7	3:7	3:5		14:44	0

West Germany was relegated to Group B for 1974.

== Tournament Awards ==
- Top Scorer: (Soviet Union) Vladimir Golikov (15 Points)
- Top Goalie: (Sweden) Göran Högosta
- Top Defenceman: (Czechoslovakia) František Joun
- Top Forward: (Soviet Union) Viktor Zhluktov

== Group B ==
Played in the Netherlands in March–April 1973

=== First round ===
Group 1

Team	ITA	YUG	AUT	NOR	NED	GF/GA	Points
1. Italy		5:5	6:1	7:6	4:2	22:14	7
2. Yugoslavia	5:5		4:4	5:5	7:2	21:16	5
3. Austria	1:6	4:4		5:5	5:2	15:17	4
4. Norway	6:7	5:5	5:5		2:2	18:19	3
5. Netherlands	2:4	2:7	2:5	2:2		8:18	1

Group 2

Team	POL	ROM	FRA	DEN	BUL	GF/GA	Points
1. Poland		6:0	10:2	17:3	11:1	44:6	8
2. Romania	0:6		12:4	9:4	9:1	30:15	6
3. France	2:10	4:12		3:5	5:2	14:29	2
4. Denmark	3:17	4:9	5:3		1:3	13:32	2
5. Bulgaria	1:11	1:9	2:5	3:1		7:26	2

=== Placing round ===
9th place	Bulgaria	4:3	Netherlands
7th place	Norway	9:0 (3:0, 1:0, 5:0)	Denmark
5th place	France	7:4 (0:3, 3:1, 4:0)	Austria
3rd place	Yugoslavia	5:3 (1:2, 1:1, 3:0)	Romania
Final	Poland	12:6 (9:0, 1:2, 2:4)	Italy

Poland was promoted to Group A for 1974.
