= 1971 IIHF European U19 Championship =

The 1971 IIHF European U19 Championship was the fourth playing of the IIHF European Junior Championships.

== Group A ==
Played in Prešov, Czechoslovakia from December 27, 1970, to January 3, 1971.

Team	URS	SWE	TCH	FIN	FRG	NOR	GF/GA	Points
1. Soviet Union		5:3	6:2	7:0	12:0	16:0	46:5	10
2. Sweden	3:5		6:6	13:3	9:1	15:0	46:15	7
3. Czechoslovakia	2:6	6:6		5:4	8:0	19:3	40:19	7
4. Finland	0:7	3:13	4:5		14:4	9:2	30:31	4
5. West Germany	0:12	1:9	0:8	4:14		5:2	10:45	2
6. Norway	0:16	0:15	3:19	2:9	2:5		7:64	0

Norway should have been relegated to Group B for 1972, but were not because Romania declined their promotion.

== Tournament Awards ==
- Top Scorer: (Sweden) Martin Karlsson (17 Points)
- Top Goalie: (Soviet Union) Vladislav Tretiak
- Top Defenceman: (Finland) Pekka Rautakallio
- Top Forward: (Sweden) Martin Karlsson

== Group B ==
Played in Bucharest, Romania from December 27, 1970, to January 3, 1971.

Team	ROM	POL	DEN	HUN	BUL	GF/GA	Points
1. Romania		2:0	10:1	6:2	9:0	27:3	8
2. Poland	0:2		8:2	5:3	12:2	25:9	6
3. Denmark	1:10	2:8		3:3	5:4	11:25	3
4. Hungary	2:6	3:5	3:3		3:3	11:17	2
5. Bulgaria	0:9	2:12	4:5	3:3		9:29	1

Romania should have been promoted to Group A for 1972, but they declined.
