= 1976 IIHF European U19 Championship =

International ice hockey tournament

The 1976 IIHF European U19 Championship was the ninth playing of the IIHF European Junior Championships.

== Group A ==
Played in Kopřivnice and Opava, Czechoslovakia in March 21–29, 1976.

=== First round ===
Group 1

Team	URS	FIN	POL	TCH'B'	GF/GA	Points
1. Soviet Union		6:1	9:2	4:2	15:3	4
2. Finland	1:6		5:2		6:8	2
3. Poland	2:9	2:5		2:11	4:14	0
NR CzechoslovakiaB	2:4		11:2		13:6	2

- NOTE Bulgaria was supposed to participate in this group, but could not because of an epidemic of the Grippe. An under 18 Czech team filled in, but arrived too late to play their game against Finland. None of their games counted in the standings, so their totals are only shown for interest.

Group 2

Team	TCH	SWE	FRG	SUI	GF/GA	Points
1. Czechoslovakia		4:3	5:3	8:1	17:7	6
2. Sweden	3:4		7:2	8:1	18:7	4
3. West Germany	3:5	2:7		7:5	12:17	2
4. Switzerland	1:8	1:8	5:7		7:23	0

=== Final round ===
Championship round

Team	URS	SWE	FIN	TCH	GF/GA	Points
1. Soviet Union		2:2	(6:1)	7:4	15:7	5
2. Sweden	2:2		5:1	(3:4)	10:7	3
3. Finland	(1:6)	1:5		6:3	8:14	2
4. Czechoslovakia	4:7	(4:3)	3:6		11:16	2

Placing round

Team	FRG	POL	SUI	TCH'B'	GF/GA	Points
1. West Germany		11:5	(7:5)	1:10	18:10	4
2. Poland	5:11		8:4	(2:11)	13:15	2
3. Switzerland	(5:7)	4:8		2:16	9:15	0
NR CzechoslovakiaB	10:1	(11:2)	16:2		37:5	6

- The Czechoslovakia B games do not count in the standings. Bulgaria was relegated to Group B for 1977.

== Tournament Awards ==
- Top Scorer: (West Germany) Ernst Höfner (12 Points)
- Top Goalie: (Sweden) Pelle Lindbergh
- Top Defenceman: (Soviet Union) Viacheslav Fetisov
- Top Forward: (Soviet Union) Valeri Yevstifeyev

== Group B ==
Played in Bucharest and Ploiești, Romania from March 13–21, 1976

=== First round ===
Group 1

Team	ROM	NOR	FRA	ITA	ESP	GF/GA	Points
1. Romania		6:4	3:2	7:3	12:2	28:11	8
2. Norway	4:6		6:1	6:1	15:2	31:10	6
3. France	2:3	1:6		6:4	6:1	15:14	4
4. Italy	3:7	1:6	4:6		7:3	15:22	2
5. Spain	2:12	2:15	1:6	3:7		8:40	0

Group 2

Team	YUG	AUT	DEN	HUN	GF/GA	Points
1. Yugoslavia		4:0	9:0	12:0	25:0	6
2. Austria	0:4		4:0	6:2	10:6	4
3. Denmark	0:9	0:4		8:5	8:18	2
4. Hungary	0:12	2:6	5:8		7:26	0

=== Placing round ===
7th place	Italy	7:5 (0:1, 4:2, 3:2)	Hungary
5th place	Denmark	7:6 o.t. (4:1, 0:1, 2:4, 1:0)	France
3rd place	Austria	3:2 (1:0, 0:2, 2:0)	Norway
Final	Romania	6:2 (1:0, 2:0, 3:2)	Yugoslavia

- Results for the fifth and the seventh place games are taken from the International Ice Hockey Encyclopedia and disagree with the scores posted on passionhockey.com's archive page.

Romania was promoted to Group A for 1977.
