= 1990 IIHF European U18 Championship =

The 1990 IIHF European U18 Championship was the twenty-third playing of the IIHF European Junior Championships.

== Group A ==
Played April 4–11, 1990 in Örnsköldsvik and Sollefteå, Sweden.

=== First round ===
Group 1

| Team | SWE | URS | POL | FRG | GF/GA | Points |
|---|---|---|---|---|---|---|
| 1. Sweden | | 3:1 | 11:4 | 9:2 | 23:7 | 6 |
| 2. Soviet Union | 1:3 | | 7:0 | 14:1 | 22:4 | 4 |
| 3. Poland | 4:11 | 0:7 | | 8:6 | 12:24 | 2 |
| 4. West Germany | 2:9 | 1:14 | 6:8 | | 9:31 | 0 |

Group 2

| Team | TCH | FIN | NOR | SUI | GF/GA | Points |
|---|---|---|---|---|---|---|
| 1. Czechoslovakia | | 6:2 | 9:1 | 7:0 | 22:3 | 6 |
| 2. Finland | 2:6 | | 7:2 | 6:0 | 15:8 | 4 |
| 3. Norway | 1:9 | 2:7 | | 8:4 | 11:20 | 2 |
| 4. Switzerland | 0:7 | 0:6 | 4:8 | | 4:21 | 0 |

=== Final round ===
Championship round

| Team | SWE | URS | TCH | FIN | NOR | POL | GF/GA | Points |
|---|---|---|---|---|---|---|---|---|
| 1. Sweden | | (3:1) | 3:3 | 2:1 | 7:0 | (11:4) | 26:9 | 9 |
| 2. Soviet Union | (1:3) | | 5:2 | 9:1 | 12:5 | (7:0) | 34:11 | 8 |
| 3. Czechoslovakia | 3:3 | 2:5 | | (6:2) | (9:1) | 13:2 | 34:13 | 7 |
| 4. Finland | 1:2 | 1:9 | (2:6) | | (7:2) | 8:4 | 19:24 | 4 |
| 5. Norway | 0:7 | 5:12 | (1:9) | (2:7) | | 12:2 | 20:37 | 2 |
| 6. Poland | (4:11) | (0:7) | 2:13 | 4:8 | 2:12 | | 12:51 | 0 |

7th place

| West Germany | 5:2 (0:1, 4:1, 1:0) | 1:4 (0:1, 1:2, 0:1) | 4:3 (3:1, 1:1, 0:1) | Switzerland |

Switzerland was relegated to Group B for 1991.

- Following the reunification of Germany, the Federal Republic of Germany ceased being referred to as West Germany and, starting in 1991, was simply referred to as Germany

== Tournament Awards ==
- Top Scorer (Soviet Union) Vyacheslav Kozlov (19 points)
- Top Goalie: (Sweden) Rolf Wanhainen
- Top Defenceman: (Czechoslovakia) Ivan Droppa
- Top Forward: (Soviet Union) Vyacheslav Kozlov

== Group B ==
Played March 21–30, 1990 in Val Gardena, Italy.

| Team | FRA | ITA | ROM | YUG | AUT | DEN | NED | ESP | GF/GA | Points |
|---|---|---|---|---|---|---|---|---|---|---|
| 1. France | | 3:2 | 1:1 | 6:1 | 5:3 | 5:5 | 14:3 | 17:1 | 51:16 | 12 |
| 2. Italy | 2:3 | | 5:5 | 7:3 | 6:0 | 9:6 | 6:2 | 10:1 | 45:20 | 11 |
| 3. Romania | 1:1 | 5:5 | | 5:5 | 4:2 | 5:2 | 6:1 | 8:5 | 34:21 | 11 |
| 4. Yugoslavia | 1:6 | 3:7 | 5:5 | | 4:2 | 6:5 | 1:1 | 6:5 | 26:31 | 8 |
| 5. Austria | 3:5 | 0:6 | 2:4 | 2:4 | | 4:2 | 7:3 | 7:2 | 25:26 | 6 |
| 6. Denmark | 5:5 | 6:9 | 2:5 | 5:6 | 2:4 | | 2:1 | 12:3 | 34:33 | 5 |
| 7. Netherlands | 3:14 | 2:6 | 1:6 | 1:1 | 3:7 | 1:2 | | 5:4 | 16:40 | 3 |
| 8. Spain | 1:17 | 1:10 | 5:8 | 5:6 | 2:7 | 3:12 | 4:5 | | 21:65 | 0 |

Undefeated France was promoted to Group A for 1991. Spain should have been relegated to Group C, however, their replacement East Germany did not exist by 1991 so the Spaniards stayed up in Group B.

== Group C ==
Played March 8–11, 1990 in Sofia, Bulgaria. East Germany, just a few months before reunification, won the tournament easily. They had last participated in Group A in 1968.

| Team | GDR | HUN | GBR | BUL | GF/GA | Points |
|---|---|---|---|---|---|---|
| 1. East Germany | | 9:4 | 10:0 | 16:0 | 35:4 | 6 |
| 2. Hungary | 4:9 | | 7:1 | 5:4 | 16:14 | 4 |
| 3. Great Britain | 0:10 | 1:7 | | 6:3 | 7:20 | 2 |
| 4. Bulgaria | 0:16 | 4:5 | 3:6 | | 7:27 | 0 |

No team was promoted; East Germany won the right to proceed to Group B, but did not exist by 1991.
