= 1970 IIHF European U19 Championship =

The 1970 IIHF European U19 Championship was the third playing of the IIHF European Junior Championships.

== Group A ==
Played in Geneva, Switzerland from December 26, 1969, to January 2, 1970.

Team	URS	TCH	SWE	FIN	FRG	SUI	GF/GA	Points
1. Soviet Union		5:3	6:5	7:1	9:1	14:1	41:11	10
2. Czechoslovakia	3:5		3:2	3:1	5:2	12:2	26:12	8
3. Sweden	5:6	2:3		6:0	10:1	20:0	43:10	6
4. Finland	1:7	1:3	0:6		6:0	5:2	13:18	4
5. West Germany	1:9	2:5	1:10	0:6		7:3	11:33	2
6. Switzerland	1:14	2:12	0:20	2:5	3:7		8:58	0

Switzerland was relegated for 1971.

== Tournament Awards ==
- Top Scorer: (Soviet Union) Yuri Savtsillo (10 Points)
- Top Goalie: (West Germany) Anton Kehle
- Top Defenceman: (Czechoslovakia) Miroslav Dvorak
- Top Forward: (Sweden) Anders Hedberg

== Group B ==
Played in Kapfenberg, Leoben, and Bruck, Austria, from December 26, 1969, to January 2, 1970.

=== First round ===
Group 1

Team	NOR	ROM	AUT	HUN	GF/GA	Points
1. Norway		1:1	5:5	7:3	13:9	4
2. Romania	1:1		1:1	3:0	5:2	4
3. Austria	5:5	1:1		2:1	8:7	4
4. Hungary	3:7	0:3	1:2		4:12	0

Group 2

Bulgaria was to play in this group but forfeited. The Yugoslavian goaltender played without a mask, and was hit in the face by a shot in their game against Poland, in part explaining the 20 to 0 score.

Team	ITA	POL	YUG	GF/GA	Points
1. Italy		7:5	3:2	10:7	4
2. Poland	5:7		20:0	25:7	2
3. Yugoslavia	2:3	0:20		2:23	0

=== Placing round ===
5th place	Austria	3:0 (1:0, 0:0, 2:0)	Yugoslavia
3rd place	Poland	7:1 (0:1, 2:0, 5:0)	Romania
Final	Norway	8:0 (1:0, 1:0, 6:0)	Italy

Norway was promoted to Group A for 1971.
