= 1972 IIHF European U19 Championship =

Ice Hockey tournament

The 1972 IIHF European U19 Championship was the fifth playing of the IIHF European Junior Championships.

== Group A ==
Played in Boden, Luleå, and Skellefteå, Sweden, from March 26 to April 2, 1972

Team	SWE	URS	TCH	FIN	FRG	NOR	GF/GA	Points
1. Sweden		4:1	6:4	5:1	6:2	11:2	32:10	10
2. Soviet Union	1:4		4:2	8:2	9:4	8:2	30:14	8
3. Czechoslovakia	4:6	2:4		4:1	17:2	10:1	37:14	6
4. Finland	1:5	2:8	1:4		6:5	9:2	19:24	4
5. West Germany	2:6	4:9	2:17	5:6		6:4	19:42	2
6. Norway	2:11	2:8	1:10	2:9	4:6		11:44	0

Norway was relegated to Group B for 1973.

== Tournament Awards ==
- Top Scorer: (Sweden) Håkan Dahllöf (10 Points)
- Top Goalie: (Sweden) Krister Sterner
- Top Defenceman: (Soviet Union) Boris Verigin
- Top Forward: (Czechoslovakia) Zdeněk Paulík

== Group B ==
Played in Lyss, Switzerland from March 25–30, 1972.

=== First round ===
Group 1

Team	POL	YUG	ITA	AUT	NED	GF/GA	Points
1. Poland		9:3	5:1	6:2	9:1	29:7	8
2. Yugoslavia	3:9		5:4	6:1	7:6	21:20	6
3. Italy	1:5	4:5		4:5	12:4	21:19	2
4. Austria	2:6	1:6	5:4		3:5	11:21	2:6
5. Netherlands	1:9	6:7	4:12	5:3		16:31	2

Group 2

Team	SUI	ROM	HUN	DEN	FRA	GF/GA	Points
1. Switzerland		6:4	3:2	9:2	15:0	33:8	8
2. Romania	4:6		6:4	7:1	7:2	24:13	6
3. Hungary	2:3	4:6		7:3	4:1	17:13	4
4. Denmark	2:9	1:7	3:7		3:0	9:23	2
5. France	0:15	2:7	1:4	0:3		3:29	0

=== Placing round ===
9th place	Netherlands	9:3 (2:3, 4:0, 3:0)	France
7th place	Austria	6:3 (2:0, 1:1, 3:2)	Denmark
5th place	Italy	5:3 (1:3, 4:0, 0:0)	Hungary
3rd place	Yugoslavia	5:4 (3:1, 0:1, 2:2)	Romania
Final	Switzerland	4:2 (1:1, 2:1, 1:0)	Poland

Switzerland was promoted to Group A for 1973.
