= 1968 IIHF European U19 Championship =

The 1968 IIHF European U19 Championship was the first official edition of the IIHF European Junior Championships. Tampere in Finland hosted the six team tournament from 26 December 1967 to 3 January 1968. Finland were qualified as hosts; the other five participants were qualified through the playoffs, played in November and December 1967.

== Qualification ==
10 November 1967	Switzerland	1–3 (1-0, 0-2, 0-1)	East Germany	Schaffhausen

12 November 1967	East Germany	10–1 (4-0, 1-0, 5-1)	Switzerland	Crimmitschau

East Germany qualified for the main tournament.

26 November 1967	Norway	1–18 (1-5, 0-5, 0-8)	Sweden	Sarpsborg

27 November 1967	Norway	0–17 (0-6, 0-5, 0-6)	Sweden	Oslo

Sweden qualified for the main tournament.

2 December 1967	France	1–16 (0-2, 1-4, 0-10)	Poland	Reims

3 December 1967	France	6–6 (1-4, 2-0, 3-2)	Poland	Reims

Poland qualified for the main tournament.

2 December 1967	Soviet Union	9–1 (2-0, 4-0, 3-1)	Bulgaria	Reims

4 December 1967	Soviet Union	4–0 (0-0, 1-0, 3-0)	Bulgaria	Reims

Soviet Union qualified for the main tournament.

West Germany	not played	Czechoslovakia

West Germany	not played	Czechoslovakia

West Germany withdrew. Czechoslovakia qualified for the main tournament.

== Tournament ==
Team	TCH	URS	SWE	FIN	POL	GDR	GF/GA	Points
1. Czechoslovakia		4:3	5:2	8:5	14:4	15:0	46:14	10
2. Soviet Union	3:4		6:4	5:2	16:2	9:2	39:14	8
3. Sweden	2:5	4:6		4:2	5:5	21:1	36:19	5
4. Finland	5:8	2:5	2:4		9:1	8:3	26:21	4
5. Poland	4:14	2:16	5:5	1:9		7:2	19:46	3
6. East Germany	0:15	2:9	1:21	3:8	2:7		8:60	0

East Germany was relegated to Group B for 1969.

== Tournament Awards ==
- Top Scorer: (Poland) Walenty Ziętara (scored 11 goals)
- Top Goalie: (Czechoslovakia) Jiří Crha
- Top Defenceman: (Soviet Union) Valeri Vasiliev
- Top Forward: (Poland) Walenty Ziętara
