= 1969 IIHF European U19 Championship =

The 1969 IIHF European U19 Championship was the second playing of the IIHF European Junior Championships.

== Group A ==
Played in Garmisch-Partenkirchen, Bavaria, West Germany, from December 26, 1968, to January 2, 1969.

Team	URS	SWE	TCH	FIN	FRG	POL	GF/GA	Points
1. Soviet Union		7:3	2:2	15:2	10:2	12:3	46:12	9
2. Sweden	3:7		5:4	8:3	6:2	15:1	37:17	8
3. Czechoslovakia	2:2	4:5		4:0	4:1	14:0	28:8	7
4. Finland	2:15	3:8	0:4		4:7	9:3	18:37	2
5. West Germany	2:10	2:6	1:4	7:4		3:4	15:28	2
6. Poland	3:12	1:15	0:14	3:9	4:3		11:53	2

Poland was relegated to Group B for 1970.

== Tournament Awards ==
- Top Scorer: (Soviet Union) Alexander Maltsev (17 Points)
- Top Goalie: (Czechoslovakia) Jiří Crha
- Top Defenceman: (Sweden) Börje Salming
- Top Forward: (Soviet Union) Alexander Maltsev

== Group B ==
Played in Geneva, Switzerland, from March 8–14, 1969.

Team	SUI	HUN	YUG	AUT	GF/GA	Points
1. Switzerland		12:2	10:4	4:0	26:6	6
2. Hungary	2:12		8:4	4:1	14:17	4
3. Yugoslavia	4:10	4:8		7:0	15:18	2
4. Austria	0:4	1:4	0:7		1:15	0

Switzerland was promoted to Group A for 1970.
