= Sergei Yashin =

Russian ice hockey player (1962–2022)

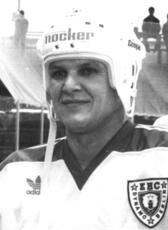
- Sergei Yashin in 1990
- Born: 6 March 1962 Penza, Russian SFSR, Soviet Union
- Died: 12 April 2022 (aged 60)
- Height: 5 ft 11 in (180 cm)
- Weight: 205 lb (93 kg; 14 st 9 lb)
- Position: Left wing
- Shot: Left
- Played for: HC Dynamo Moscow; EHC Dynamo Berlin; HC Davos; SKA Saint Petersburg; HC Neftekhimik Nizhnekamsk
- National team: Soviet Union
- NHL draft: 141st overall, 1989; Edmonton Oilers
- Playing career: 1978–2001

Sergei Anatolyevich Yashin (Russian: Сергей Анатольевич Яшин; 6 March 1962 – 12 April 2022) was a Soviet and Russian professional ice hockey left winger.

Yashin played in the Soviet Championship League for HC Dynamo Moscow, the Eishockey-Bundesliga for EHC Dynamo Berlin, and the Russian Superleague for SKA Saint Petersburg. He was also a member of the Soviet Union men's national ice hockey team and played in the 1988 Winter Olympics where he won a gold medal.

Yashin was inducted into the Russian and Soviet Hockey Hall of Fame in 1988. He died on 12 April 2022, at the age of 60.

== Honours ==
=== National ===
HC Dynamo Moscow

- Soviet Ice Hockey League winner: 1989–90; runner-up: 1979–80, 1984–85, 1985–86, 1986–87, 1988–89; third place: 1980–81, 1981–82, 1982–83, 1987–88

=== International ===
Soviet Union

- Olympic Games winner: 1988
- Ice Hockey World Championships ^{winner}: 1986, 1989; third place: 1985

Soviet Union U21

- IIHF World Junior Championship third place: 1981

Soviet Union U18

- IIHF European Junior Championships winner: 1980; third place: 1979

== Career statistics ==
=== Regular season and playoffs ===
			Regular season					Playoffs
Season	Team	League	GP	G	A	Pts	PIM	GP	G	A	Pts	PIM
1978–79	Dizel Penza	USSR II	1	0	0	0	4	—	—	—	—	—
1979–80	Dizel Penza	USSR II	26	4	3	7	20	—	—	—	—	—
1979–80	Dynamo Moscow	USSR	2	0	1	1	0	—	—	—	—	—
1980–81	Dynamo Moscow	USSR	24	2	6	8	6	—	—	—	—	—
1981–82	Dynamo Moscow	USSR	41	13	13	26	4	—	—	—	—	—
1982–83	Dynamo Moscow	USSR	43	17	6	23	36	—	—	—	—	—
1983–84	Dynamo Moscow	USSR	34	16	9	25	22	—	—	—	—	—
1984–85	Dynamo Moscow	USSR	40	15	20	35	32	—	—	—	—	—
1985–86	Dynamo Moscow	USSR	40	14	19	33	26	—	—	—	—	—
1986–87	Dynamo Moscow	USSR	40	6	11	17	36	—	—	—	—	—
1987–88	Dynamo Moscow	USSR	47	13	11	24	34	—	—	—	—	—
1988–89	Dynamo Moscow	USSR	44	18	10	28	30	—	—	—	—	—
1989–90	Dynamo Moscow	USSR	48	14	16	30	14	—	—	—	—	—
1989–90	Dynamo Moscow 2	USSR III	1	0	0	0	0	—	—	—	—	—
1990–91	EHC Dynamo Berlin	1.GBun	37	26	21	47	34	8	1	7	8	6
1991–92	HC Davos	NDB	30	30	25	55	26	—	—	—	—	—
1992–93	SKA Saint Petersburg	IHL	21	5	3	8	8	—	—	—	—	—
1992–93	EHC Essen-West	DEU II	21	18	20	38	20	5	4	7	11	8
1993–94	EHC Essen-West	DEU II	50	31	33	64	26	—	—	—	—	—
1994–95	EC Wilhelmshaven-Stickhausen	DEU II	47	47	45	92	22	—	—	—	—	—
1995–96	EC Wilhelmshaven-Stickhausen	DEU II	44	33	54	87	24	—	—	—	—	—
1996–97	EC Wilhelmshaven-Stickhausen	DEU II	51	28	59	87	20	—	—	—	—	—
1997–98	Neftekhimik Nizhnekamsk	RSL	32	4	5	9	20	—	—	—	—	—
1998–99	ERC Selb	DEU III	2	0	0	0	0	—	—	—	—	—
1999–2000	EC Wilhelmshaven-Stickhausen	DEU II	37	6	10	16	22	—	—	—	—	—
2000–01	EC Wilhelmshaven-Stickhausen	DEU II	1	0	0	0	0	—	—	—	—	—
USSR totals			403	128	122	250	240	—	—	—	—	—
DEU II totals			251	163	221	384	134	5	4	7	11	8

=== International ===
Year	Team	Event	GP	G	A	Pts	PIM
1979	Soviet Union	EJC	5	6	1	7	4
1980	Soviet Union	EJC	5	7	7	14	4
1981	Soviet Union	WJC	5	5	1	6	4
1982	Soviet Union	WJC	7	5	2	7	2
1984	Soviet Union	CC	6	0	4	4	0
1985	Soviet Union	WC	7	2	1	3	8
1986	Soviet Union	WC	10	2	1	3	4
1988	Soviet Union	OG	8	3	1	4	4
1989	Soviet Union	WC	10	0	2	2	4
Junior totals			22	23	11	34	14
Senior totals			41	7	9	16	20
