= Milan Hnilička =

Czech ice hockey player

Milan Hnilička MP
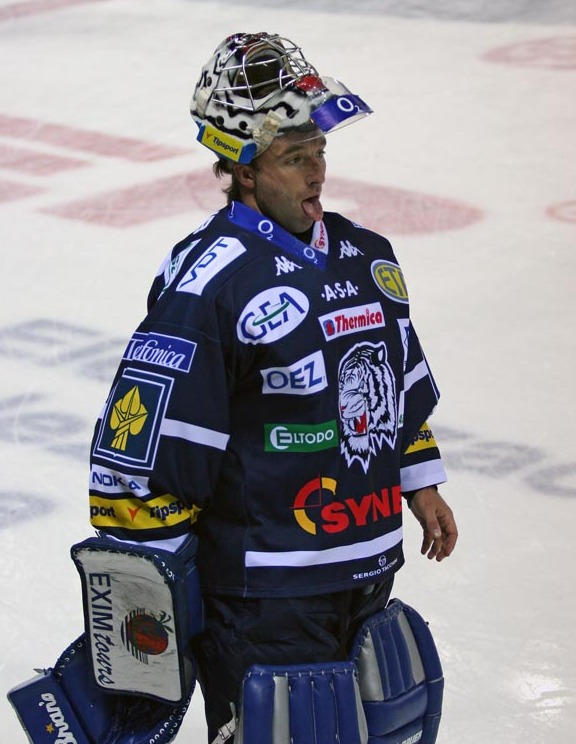

Member of the Chamber of Deputies
- In office 21 October 2017 – 26 January 2021

Personal details
- Born: 25 June 1973 (age 52) Litoměřice, Czechoslovakia
Ice hockey career
- Height: 6 ft 0 in (183 cm)
- Weight: 194 lb (88 kg; 13 st 12 lb)
- Position: Goaltender
- Caught: Left
- Played for: Kladno; Sparta Praha; New York Rangers; Atlanta Thrashers; Los Angeles Kings; Bílí Tygři Liberec; Salavat Yulaev Ufa; Slavia Praha
- National team: Czechoslovakia and Czech Republic
- NHL draft: 70th overall, 1991; New York Islanders
- Playing career: 1989–2010

Milan Hnilička (born June 25, 1973) is a Czech former professional ice hockey player and politician. He played in the National Hockey League (NHL) for the New York Rangers, Atlanta Thrashers and the Los Angeles Kings. He was a member of the Chamber of Deputies since 2017, but resigned in January 2021, after attending a party in breach of coronavirus restrictions. He was drafted 70th overall by the New York Islanders in the 1991 NHL entry draft. In 2000, Hnilička won the Calder Cup while playing for the Hartford Wolf Pack of the American Hockey League (AHL). He announced his retirement in August 2010. Internationally, Hnilička represented the Czechoslovak national junior team and the Czech national senior team at multiple tournaments.

== Playing career ==
Hnilička played for Poldi SONP Kladno in the Czechoslovak Extraliga for several years. At the 1991 NHL entry draft he was selected 70th overall by the New York Islanders, and moved to North America in 1992, spending one season in major junior with the Swift Current Broncos of the Western Hockey League (WHL), helping them reach the 1993 Memorial Cup. He then spent two seasons in the minor leagues before returning to the Czech Extraliga, where he played a further four seasons. Signed by the New York Rangers of the National Hockey League (NHL) in 1999, he made his NHL debut on October 14, 1999, against the Pittsburgh Penguins. He played two games for the Rangers, spending the majority of the season with their American Hockey League (AHL) affiliate, the Hartford Wolf Pack, winning the Calder Cup with them as AHL champions.

Signing as a free agent with the Atlanta Thrashers, he spent three seasons with them, before being traded to the Los Angeles Kings in 2003. Hnilička mainly played for the Kings' AHL affiliate, the Manchester Monarchs, appearing in two games for the Kings. He returned to the Czech Republic in 2004 and played five seasons with Bílí Tygři Liberec, as well as briefly playing for Salavat Yulaev Ufa of the Russian Superleague in the 2007–08 season. Hnilička's last games were during the 2009–10 season when he played three games for Slavia Praha. He holds the Atlanta Thrashers/Winnipeg Jets franchise record for saves in one game with 53 that he achieved on 18 December 2001, against the Boston Bruins.

== International play ==
Hnilička played his first game for the Czechoslovak junior team in 1990 at the 1990 European Junior Championships, winning a bronze medal. He played again for the Czechoslovak junior team at the 1991 World Junior Championships, again winning bronze. He was named to the Czechoslovak senior team for both the 1991 Canada Cup and 1991 World Championships, but did not play in either tournament. Hnilička's final tournament for Czechoslovakia was in the 1992 World Junior Championships, where the team finished fifth.

With the dissolution of Czechoslovakia he began to represent the Czech national team, playing in seven World Championships and the 1998 and 2006 Winter Olympics (though he did not play in 1998). He won gold at the 1999, 2001, and 2005 World Championships, as well as a silver medal in 2006 and bronze in both 1997 and 1998.

== Career statistics ==
=== Regular season and playoffs ===
			Regular season									Playoffs
Season	Team	League	GP	W	L	T	MIN	GA	SO	GAA	SV%	GP	W	L	MIN	GA	SO	GAA	SV%
1988–89	Poldi SONP Kladno	CSSR U18	34	—	—	—	—	—	2.51	.921	—	—	—	—	—	—	—	—
1989–90	Poldi SONP Kladno	CSSR	24	—	—	—	1,113	70	—	3.77	—	—	—	—	—	—	—	—	—
1990–91	Poldi SONP Kladno	CSSR	40	—	—	—	2,122	98	—	2.80	.902	—	—	—	—	—	—	—	—
1991–92	Poldi SONP Kladno	CSSR	38	—	—	—	2,066	128	—	3.73	—	—	—	—	—	—	—	—	—
1992–93	Swift Current Broncos	WHL	65	46	12	2	3,679	206	2	3.36	.896	17	12	5	1,017	54	2	3.19	.911
1992–93	Swift Current Broncos	M-Cup	—	—	—	—	—	—	—	—	—	4	—	—	—	—	—	4.72	—
1993–94	Richmond Renegades	ECHL	43	18	16	5	2,299	155	4	4.05	.883	—	—	—	—	—	—	—	—
1993–94	Salt Lake Golden Eagles	IHL	8	5	1	0	378	25	0	3.97	.892	—	—	—	—	—	—	—	—
1994–95	Denver Grizzlies	IHL	15	9	4	1	798	47	1	3.53	.890	—	—	—	—	—	—	—	—
1995–96	Poldi Kladno	CZE	33	16	12	5	1,895	151	1	4.78	.868	8	3	5	492	24	0	2.93	.916
1996–97	Poldi Kladno	CZE	48	20	17	11	2,741	120	4	2.63	.928	3	0	3	150	14	0	5.60	.863
1997–98	Sparta Praha	CZE	49	25	14	10	2,498	90	6	2.16	.943	11	5	6	631	33	0	3.14	.912
1998–99	Sparta Praha	CZE	50	27	15	8	2,876	109	4	2.27	.925	8	5	3	501	12	2	1.44	.960
1999–00	New York Rangers	NHL	2	0	1	0	86	5	0	3.49	.886	—	—	—	—	—	—	—	—
1999–00	Hartford Wolf Pack	AHL	36	22	11	0	1,979	71	5	2.15	.928	3	0	1	99	6	0	3.64	.854
2000–01	Atlanta Thrashers	NHL	36	12	19	2	1,879	105	2	3.35	.890	—	—	—	—	—	—	—	—
2001–02	Atlanta Thrashers	NHL	60	13	33	10	3,367	179	3	3.19	.908	—	—	—	—	—	—	—	—
2002–03	Atlanta Thrashers	NHL	21	4	13	1	1,097	65	0	3.56	.893	—	—	—	—	—	—	—	—
2002–03	Chicago Wolves	AHL	15	11	2	1	838	33	1	2.36	.922	—	—	—	—	—	—	—	—
2003–04	Los Angeles Kings	NHL	2	0	1	0	80	5	0	3.76	.881	—	—	—	—	—	—	—	—
2003–04	Manchester Monarchs	AHL	20	8	10	0	1,022	44	1	2.58	.908	2	0	2	127	5	0	2.37	.914
2004–05	Bílí Tygři Liberec	CZE	46	28	16	2	2,740	106	5	2.32	.928	12	5	7	702	32	0	2.74	.927
2005–06	Bílí Tygři Liberec	CZE	45	29	11	5	2,644	75	6	1.70	.940	4	1	3	158	10	0	3.80	.861
2006–07	Bílí Tygři Liberec	CZE	40	28	12	—	2,370	73	4	1.85	.943	12	5	7	716	34	0	2.85	.916
2007–08	Bílí Tygři Liberec	CZE	15	11	4	—	890	30	2	2.02	.937	—	—	—	—	—	—	—	—
2007–08	Salavat Yulaev Ufa	RSL	9	—	—	—	560	18	1	1.93	.918	1	1	—	—	59	0	3.02	.885
2008–09	Bílí Tygři Liberec	CZE	22	9	13	—	1,243	66	0	3.19	.910	—	—	—	—	—	—	—	—
2009–10	Slavia Praha	CZE	3	0	3	—	178	13	0	4.38	.833	—	—	—	—	—	—	—	—
CZE totals			351	193	117	41	20,075	833	32	2.49	.925	58	24	34	3,350	159	2	2.85	.919
NHL totals			121	29	67	13	6,509	359	5	3.31	.900	—	—	—	—	—	—	—	—

=== International ===
Olympic medal record

Men's ice hockey
Gold medal – first place	1998 Nagano	Team
Bronze medal – third place	2006 Torino	Team

Year	Team	Event	GP	W	L	T	MIN	GA	SO	GAA	SV%
1990	Czechoslovakia	EJC	4	—	—	—	—	—	—	2.78	.864
1991	Czechoslovakia	WJC	5	4	1	0	269	14	1	3.12	—
1991	Czechoslovakia	EJC	—	—	—	—	—	—	—	—	—
1991	Czechoslovakia	WC	DNP	—	—	—	—	—	—	—	—
1991	Czechoslovakia	CC	DNP	—	—	—	—	—	—	—	—
1992	Czechoslovakia	WJC	6	—	—	—	329	20	0	3.65	.853
1992	Czechoslovakia	WC	DNP	—	—	—	—	—	—	—	—
1997	Czech Republic	WC	1	1	0	0	60	3	0	3.00	.885
1998	Czech Republic	OG	DNP	—	—	—	—	—	—	—	—
1998	Czech Republic	WC	8	4	1	2	430	10	2	1.39	.940
1999	Czech Republic	WC	9	—	—	—	429	16	1	2.24	.911
2001	Czech Republic	WC	9	8	0	1	541	13	1	1.44	.952
2002	Czech Republic	WC	5	4	1	0	299	9	1	1.81	.917
2005	Czech Republic	WC	1	1	0	0	60	0	1	0.00	1.000
2006	Czech Republic	OG	3	1	1	0	128	6	0	2.82	.878
2006	Czech Republic	WC	9	5	2	2	548	24	0	2.63	.893
2008	Czech Republic	WC	6	3	3	—	371	16	1	2.59	.878
Senior totals			57	—	—	—	2,866	97	7	2.03	—
