= Finland men's national under-18 ice hockey team =

Finland
- Nickname: Pikkuleijonat (The little Lions)
- Association: Suomen jääkiekkoliitto
- Head coach: (Finland) Jussi Ahokas
- Team colors
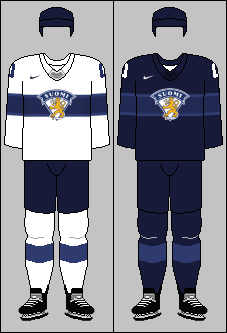

First international
- Finland 10–1 East Germany (Yaroslavl, Soviet Union; 1 April 1967); Sweden 8–1 Finland (Bremerhaven, West Germany; 1 April 1977)

Biggest win
- Finland 28–0 Italy (Tychy, Poland; 1 April 1979)

Biggest defeat
- Soviet Union 14–2 Finland (Bremerhaven, West Germany; 2 April 1977)

IIHF World U18 Championship
- Appearances: 23 (first in 1999)
- Best result: Gold: 1999, 2000, 2016, 2018

Medal record

World U18 Championships
Gold medal – first place	1999 Germany	
Gold medal – first place	2000 Switzerland	
Gold medal – first place	2016 USA	
Gold medal – first place	2018 Russia	
Silver medal – second place	2006 Sweden	
Silver medal – second place	2015 Switzerland	
Silver medal – second place	2017 Slovakia	
Bronze medal – third place	2001 Finland	
Bronze medal – third place	2009 USA	
Bronze medal – third place	2010 Belarus	
Bronze medal – third place	2013 Russia	
Bronze medal – third place	2022 Germany	

Ivan Hlinka Memorial Tournament
Silver medal – second place	2007 Czech Republic/Slovakia	
Silver medal – second place	2012 Czech Republic/Slovakia	
Bronze medal – third place	1996 Canada	
Bronze medal – third place	2005 Czech Republic/Slovakia	
Bronze medal – third place	2022 Canada	
Bronze medal – third place	2026 Canada	

IIHF European Junior Championships
Gold medal – first place	1978 Finland	
Gold medal – first place	1986 West Germany	
Gold medal – first place	1995 Germany	
Gold medal – first place	1997 Czech Republic	
Silver medal – second place	1967 Soviet union	
Silver medal – second place	1979 Poland	
Silver medal – second place	1983 Norway	
Silver medal – second place	1988 Czechoslovakia	
Silver medal – second place	1996 Russia	
Silver medal – second place	1998 Sweden	
Bronze medal – third place	1974 Switzerland	
Bronze medal – third place	1976 Czechoslovakia	
Bronze medal – third place	1989 Soviet Union	
Bronze medal – third place	1991 Czechoslovakia	

Medal record

World U-17 Hockey Challenge
Gold medal – first place	1990 Canada	
Silver medal – second place	1995 Canada	
Silver medal – second place	2018 Canada	
Bronze medal – third place	1998 Canada	
Bronze medal – third place	2022 Canada	

European Youth Olympic Winter Festival
Gold medal – first place	1999 Slovakia	Team
Gold medal – first place	2013 Romania	Team
Gold medal – first place	2022 Finland	Team
Silver medal – second place	2007 Spain	Team
Silver medal – second place	2011 Czech Republic	Team
Bronze medal – third place	1997 Sweden	Team
Bronze medal – third place	2001 Finland	Team
Bronze medal – third place	2003 Slovenia	Team
Bronze medal – third place	2009 Poland	Team
Bronze medal – third place	2015 Austria\Liechtenstein	Team
Bronze medal – third place	2019 Bosnia and Herzegovina	Team
Bronze medal – third place	2023 Italy	Team

The Finland men's national under-18 ice hockey team is the men's national under-18 ice hockey team of Finland. The team is controlled by the Finnish Ice Hockey Association, a member of the International Ice Hockey Federation. The team represents Finland at the IIHF World U18 Championships.

== International competitions ==
=== IIHF European U18 / U19 Championships ===
Tournament	Rank
(Soviet Union) 1967 Yaroslavl, Russian SFSR	2nd place, silver medalist(s)
(Finland) 1968 Tampere	4th
(West Germany) 1969 Garmisch-Partenkirchen / Bavaria	4th
(Switzerland) 1970 Geneva	4th
(Czechoslovakia) 1971 Prešov, Slovak SR	4th
(Sweden) 1972 Boden / Luleå / Skellefteå	4th
(Soviet Union) 1973 Leningrad, Russian SFSR	4th
(Switzerland) 1974 Herisau / Appenzell / Ausserrhoden	3rd place, bronze medalist(s)
(France) 1975 Grenoble	4th
(Czechoslovakia) 1976 Kopřivnice / Opava, Czech SR	3rd place, bronze medalist(s)
(West Germany) 1977 Bremerhaven / Bremen	4th
(Finland) 1978 Vantaa	1st place, gold medalist(s)
(Poland) 1979 Tychy / Katowice	2nd place, silver medalist(s)
(Czechoslovakia) 1980 Brno / Hradec Králové, Czech SR	4th
(Soviet Union) 1981 Minsk, Belorussian SSR	4th
(Sweden) 1982 Ängelholm / Tyringe	4th
(Norway) 1983 Oslo	2nd place, silver medalist(s)
(West Germany) 1984 Rosenheim / Garmisch-Partenkirchen / Füssen / Bad Tölz / Bavaria	4th
(France) 1985 Anglet	5th
(West Germany) 1986 Düsseldorf / Ratingen / Krefeld / North Rhine-Westphalia	1st place, gold medalist(s)
(Finland) 1987 Tampere / Kouvola / Hämeenlinna	4th
(Czechoslovakia) 1988 Frýdek-Místek / Vsetín / Olomouc / Přerov, Czech SR	2nd place, silver medalist(s)
(Soviet Union) 1989 Kiev, Ukrainian SSR	3rd place, bronze medalist(s)
(Sweden) 1990 Örnsköldsvik / Sollefteå	4th
(Czechoslovakia) 1991 Spišská Nová Ves / Prešov, Slovak SR	3rd place, bronze medalist(s)
(Norway) 1992 Lillehammer / Hamar	4th
(Poland) 1993 Nowy Targ / Oswiecim	4th
(Finland) 1994 Jyväskylä	4th
(Germany) 1995 Berlin	1st place, gold medalist(s)
(Russia) 1996 Ufa	2nd place, silver medalist(s)
(Czech Republic) 1997 Znojmo / Třebíč	1st place, gold medalist(s)
(Sweden) 1998 Malung / Mora	2nd place, silver medalist(s)

=== IIHF World U18 Championships ===
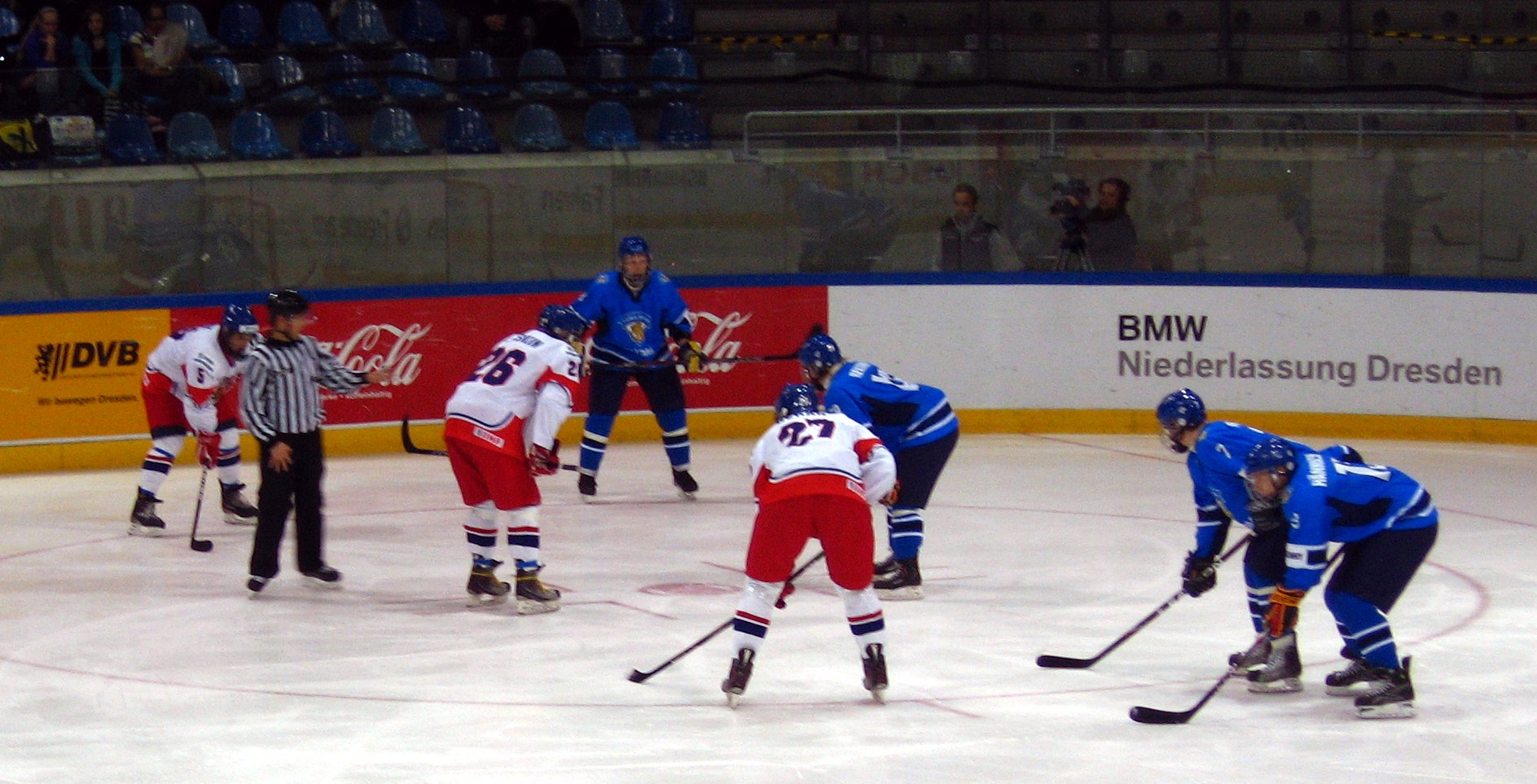
Finland U18 against Czech Republic U18 in 2011

Tournament	Rank
(Germany) 1999 Füssen / Kaufbeuren	1st place, gold medalist(s)
(Switzerland) 2000 Kloten / Weinfelden	1st place, gold medalist(s)
(Finland) 2001 Heinola / Helsinki / Lahti	3rd place, bronze medalist(s)
(Slovakia) 2002 Piešťany / Trnava	4th
(Russia) 2003 Yaroslavl	7th
(Belarus) 2004 Minsk	7th
(Czech Republic) 2005 České Budějovice / Plzeň	7th
(Sweden) 2006 Ängelholm / Halmstad	2nd place, silver medalist(s)
(Finland) 2007 Tampere / Rauma	7th
(Russia) 2008 Kazan	6th
(United States) 2009 Fargo	3rd place, bronze medalist(s)
(Belarus) 2010 Minsk / Babruysk	3rd place, bronze medalist(s)
(Germany) 2011 Crimmitschau / Dresden	5th
(Czech Republic) 2012 Brno / Znojmo / Břeclav	4th
(Russia) 2013 Sochi	3rd place, bronze medalist(s)
(Finland) 2014 Lappeenranta / Imatra	6th
(Switzerland) 2015 Zug / Lucerne	2nd place, silver medalist(s)
(United States) 2016 Grand Forks	1st place, gold medalist(s)
(Slovakia) 2017 Poprad / Spišská Nová Ves	2nd place, silver medalist(s)
(Russia) 2018 Chelyabinsk / Magnitogorsk	1st place, gold medalist(s)
(Sweden) 2019 Örnsköldsvik / Umeå	7th
(United States) 2020 Plymouth / Ann Arbor	Cancelled
(United States) 2021 Frisco / Plano	4th
(Germany) 2022 Landshut / Kaufbeuren	3rd place, bronze medalist(s)
(Switzerland) 2023 Basel / Porrentruy	5th
(Finland) 2024 Espoo / Vantaa	5th
(United States) 2025 Frisco / Allen	5th
(Slovakia) 2026 Trenčín / Bratislava	7th
(United States) 2027 Duluth	
