= 1977 IIHF European U18 Championship =

The 1977 IIHF European U18 Championship was the tenth playing of the IIHF European Junior Championships. With the creation of the World Junior Hockey Championships, which used players under the age of 20, the European championships adjusted the age limitation to being under 18.

== Group A ==
Played in Bremerhaven, West Germany from April 1–10, 1977. Romania was to participate but withdrew (and forfeited) in the aftermath of the earthquake that hit the area in March of that year.

Team	SWE	TCH	URS	FIN	SUI	FRG	POL	GF/GA	Points
1. Sweden		4:0	5:2	8:1	13:2	15:1	13:1	58:7	12
2. Czechoslovakia	0:4		5:3	10:1	15:3	10:1	9:1	49:13	10
3. Soviet Union	2:5	3:5		14:2	6:4	7:3	17:0	49:19	8
4. Finland	1:8	1:10	2:14		11:2	8:3	8:1	31:38	6
5. Switzerland	2:13	3:15	4:6	2:11		2:2	8:5	21:52	3
6. West Germany	1:15	1:10	3:7	3:8	2:2		4:3	14:45	3
7. Poland	1:13	1:9	0:17	1:8	5:8	3:4		11:59	0

Romania, after withdrawing, was relegated to Group B for 1978.

== Tournament Awards ==
- Top Scorer: (Sweden) Conny Silfverberg (17 Points)
- Top Goalie: (Sweden) Pelle Lindbergh
- Top Defenceman: (Czechoslovakia) Peter Slanina
- Top Forward: (Sweden) Conny Silfverberg

== Group B ==
Played in Bilbao and San Sebastián, Spain from March 30 to April 4, 1977.

=== First round ===
Group 1

Team	YUG	DEN	FRA	ESP	GF/GA	Points
1. Yugoslavia		4:2	7:2	10:2	21:6	6
2. Denmark	2:4		12:3	10:1	24:8	4
3. France	2:7	3:12		6:2	11:21	2
4. Spain	2:10	1:10	2:6		5:26	0

Group 2

Team	NOR	AUT	ITA	NED	GF/GA	Points
1. Norway		6:3	6:1	3:2	15:6	6
2. Austria	3:6		3:2	8:5	14:13	4
3. Italy	1:6	2:3		3:2	6:11	2
4. Netherlands	2:3	5:8	2:3		9:14	0

=== Placing round ===
7th place	Netherlands	7:3 (4:0, 2:1, 1:2)	Spain
5th place	Italy	4:3 o.t. (1:1, 2:1, 0:1, 1:0)	France
3rd place	Denmark	5:2 (2:1, 1:1, 2:0)	Austria
Final	Norway	4:1 (0:0, 1:1, 3:0)	Yugoslavia

Norway was promoted to group A, and Spain was relegated to the new Group C, for 1978.

== Bibliography ==
- Complete results
- Duplacey, James (1998). Total Hockey: The official encyclopedia of the National Hockey League. Total Sports. pp. 530–2.
