= 1967 European U19 Championship =

The 1967 European U19 Championship was an unofficial playing of the IIHF European U19 Championships. The tournament was held in Yaroslavl, Soviet Union from March 15–24, 1967. The official championships started in 1968.

== Group A ==
Team	URS	SWE	POL	HUN	GF/GA	Points
1. Soviet Union		4:1	13:0	19:0	36:1	6
2. Sweden	1:4		11:0	17:2	29:6	4
3. Poland	0:13	0:11		9:1	9:25	2
4. Hungary	0:19	2:17	1:9		3:45	0

== Group B ==
Team	FIN	TCH	DDR	ROU	GF/GA	Points
1. Finland		6:4	10:1	14:1	30:6	6
2. Czechoslovakia	4:6		5:2	10:1	19:9	4
3. East Germany	1:10	2:5		4:2	7:17	2
4. Romania	1:14	1:10	2:4		4:28	0

== Final round ==
Team	URS	FIN	SWE	TCH	GF/GA	Points
1. Soviet Union		2:0	(4:1)	4:6	10:8	4
2. Finland	0:2		6:6	(6:4)	12:12	3
3. Sweden	(1:4)	6:6		4:2	11:12	3
4. Czechoslovakia	6:4	(4:6)	2:4		12:14	2
