= Alexei Kovalev =

Russian ice hockey player (born 1973)

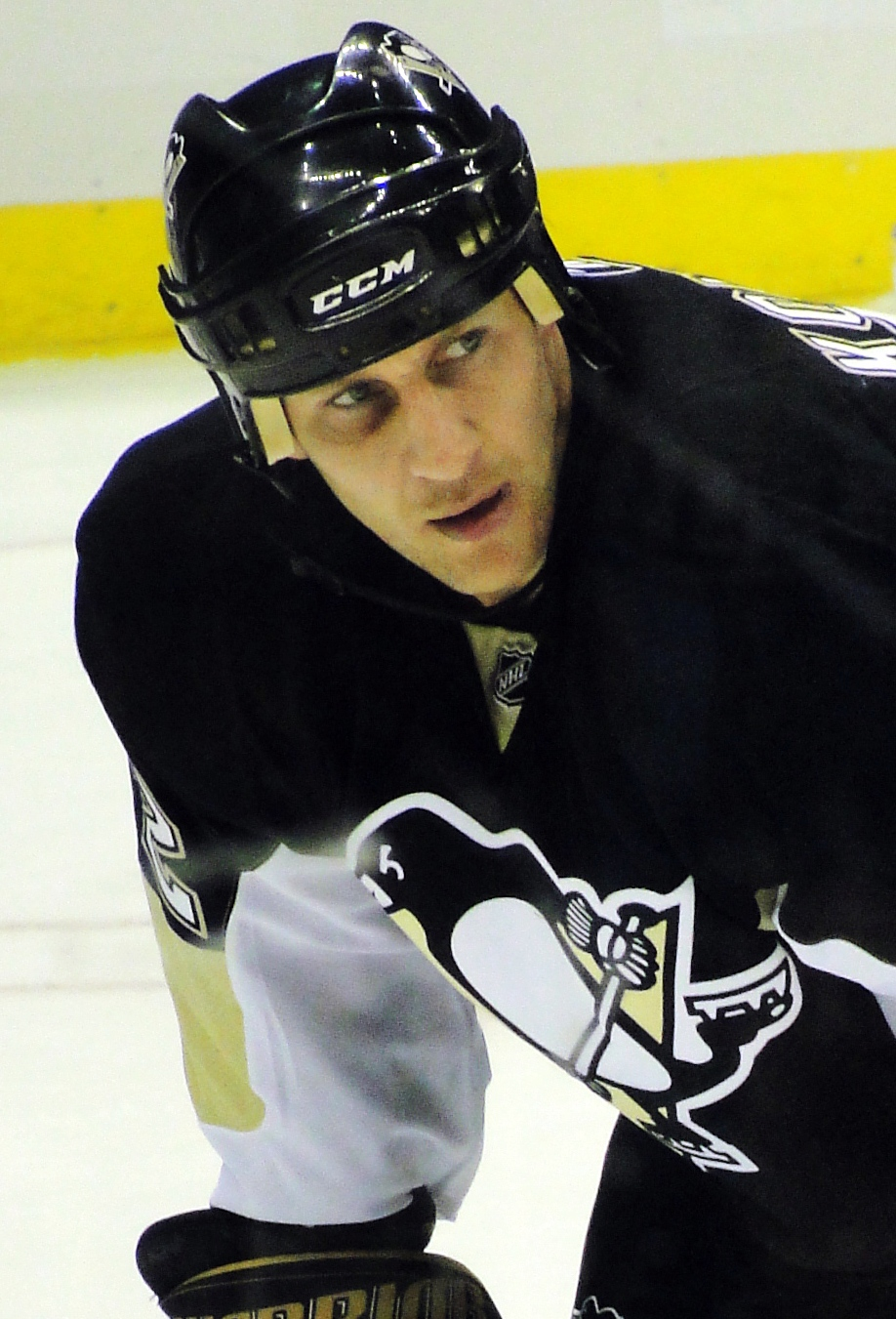
- Kovalev with the Pittsburgh Penguins in 2011
- Born: 24 February 1973 (age 53) Tolyatti, Russian SFSR, Soviet Union
- Height: 6 ft 2 in (188 cm)
- Weight: 222 lb (101 kg; 15 st 12 lb)
- Position: Right wing
- Shot: Left
- Played for: Dynamo Moscow; New York Rangers; Lada Togliatti; Pittsburgh Penguins; Montreal Canadiens; Ak Bars Kazan; Ottawa Senators; Atlant Moscow Oblast; Florida Panthers
- National team: Unified Team and Russia
- NHL draft: 15th overall, 1991; New York Rangers
- Playing career: 1989–2017

Alexei Vyacheslavovich Kovalev (Russian: Алексей Вячеславович Ковалёв, IPA: [ɐlʲɪkˈsʲej vʲɪtɕɪˈslavəvʲɪtɕ kəvɐˈlʲɵf]; born 24 February 1973) is a Russian former professional ice hockey coach, executive and former professional player.

During his career, he played in over 1,300 National Hockey League (NHL) games over 18 seasons for the New York Rangers, Pittsburgh Penguins, Montreal Canadiens, Ottawa Senators, and Florida Panthers between 1992 and 2013. He was originally drafted by the Rangers and won a Stanley Cup with them in 1994.

Kovalev also played in the Kontinental Hockey League (KHL) with Atlant Moscow Oblast, and was last active with EHC Visp of Switzerland's National League B.

== Playing career ==
Kovalev was drafted by the New York Rangers in the first round, 15th overall, of the 1991 NHL entry draft. He became the first Russian-born player to be drafted in the first round in the history of the NHL as well as the first Soviet player to be drafted in the first round. Best known for his stickhandling skills, deking ability and wrist shot, he became an important part of the Rangers' 1994 Stanley Cup run, finishing with the third-most points for New York in the 1994 playoffs. Kovalev, Alexander Karpovtsev, Sergei Nemchinov and Sergei Zubov were the first Russians to have their names engraved on the Stanley Cup. The Rangers' Stanley Cup win is well remembered in Europe because of the first Russian names on the Stanley Cup, as MSG Network broadcaster Al Trautwig said in his essay, Garden of Dreams.

During the 1994–95 NHL lockout, Kovalev returned to Russia to play for his hometown team Lada Togliatti, the defending International Hockey League champion from 1994. Kovalev scored eight goals and eight assists in 12 games. He also participated in Lada Togliatti's 30th anniversary game, and scored a hat-trick for the Lada veterans team.

Just 14 games into the 1998–99 season, on 25 November 1998, Kovalev was traded, along with Harry York, to the Pittsburgh Penguins in exchange for Petr Nedvěd, Sean Pronger and Chris Tamer. While only putting up 46 points in 63 games with the Penguins, he managed a strong effort with 12 points in 10 post-season games. In the next two seasons, he recorded two of his best seasons in the NHL with 76 and 95 points, respectively.

In a trade to mainly reduce their salary, Pittsburgh sent Kovalev back to the Rangers on 10 February 2003. He was sent, along with Dan LaCouture, Janne Laukkanen and Mike Wilson, for Mikael Samuelsson, Rico Fata, Joel Bouchard, Richard Lintner and cash.

On 13 March 2004, Kovalev was traded to the Montreal Canadiens for Jozef Balej and a second-round draft pick in the 2004 NHL entry draft. While only managing three points in 12 games in the regular season, Kovalev broke out in the 2004 playoffs, registering six goals and ten points in 11 games.

Kovalev spent the 2004–05 NHL lockout playing for Ak Bars Kazan, in the Russian Superleague (RSL), where he registered 23 points in 35 games. He then played for Russia at the 2005 World Championships in Austria, and was named the tournament's best forward.

As an unrestricted free agent, Kovalev opted to re-sign with Montreal on a four-year contract paying $4.5 million annually just prior to the start of the 2005–06 season, on 3 August. He scored his 300th career goal and recorded his 700th point on 20 December 2005, against Dominik Hašek in a 4–3 win against the Ottawa Senators.

In 2006, Warrior signed Kovalev to endorse their hockey sticks. Warrior designed a custom shaft known as the AK27.

In 2007, Kovalev sparked controversy when he allegedly criticized his team, coaching staff and the Montreal media in an interview with a Russian reporter in his native language. During that 2006–07 season, he amassed only 18 goals and 29 assists for a total of 47 points.

During the 2007–08 season, Kovalev found a resurgence playing alongside linemates Andrei Kostitsyn and Tomáš Plekanec, recording a total of 35 goals, 49 assists for a total of 84 points in 82 games. As of the season's completion, he stood at the 94th spot of the top 100 all-time NHL scorers. Due to his inspired play, Kovalev was awarded the Canadiens' captaincy on two occasions during the season, replacing the injured Saku Koivu in his absence.

The following season, in 2008–09, Kovalev was named captain of the Eastern Conference at the 2009 NHL All-Star game in Montreal, and won Most Valuable Player honors as a result of his two goals, assist and game-winning shootout goal. Late in the season with the Canadiens, Kovalev scored his 100th goal with the club on 31 March 2009, against former teammate and Canadiens goaltender Cristobal Huet of the Chicago Blackhawks. At the end of the week, he was named the NHL's First Star for the Week ending 5 April after scoring two goals and seven assists, helping lead the Canadiens to three wins during that time.

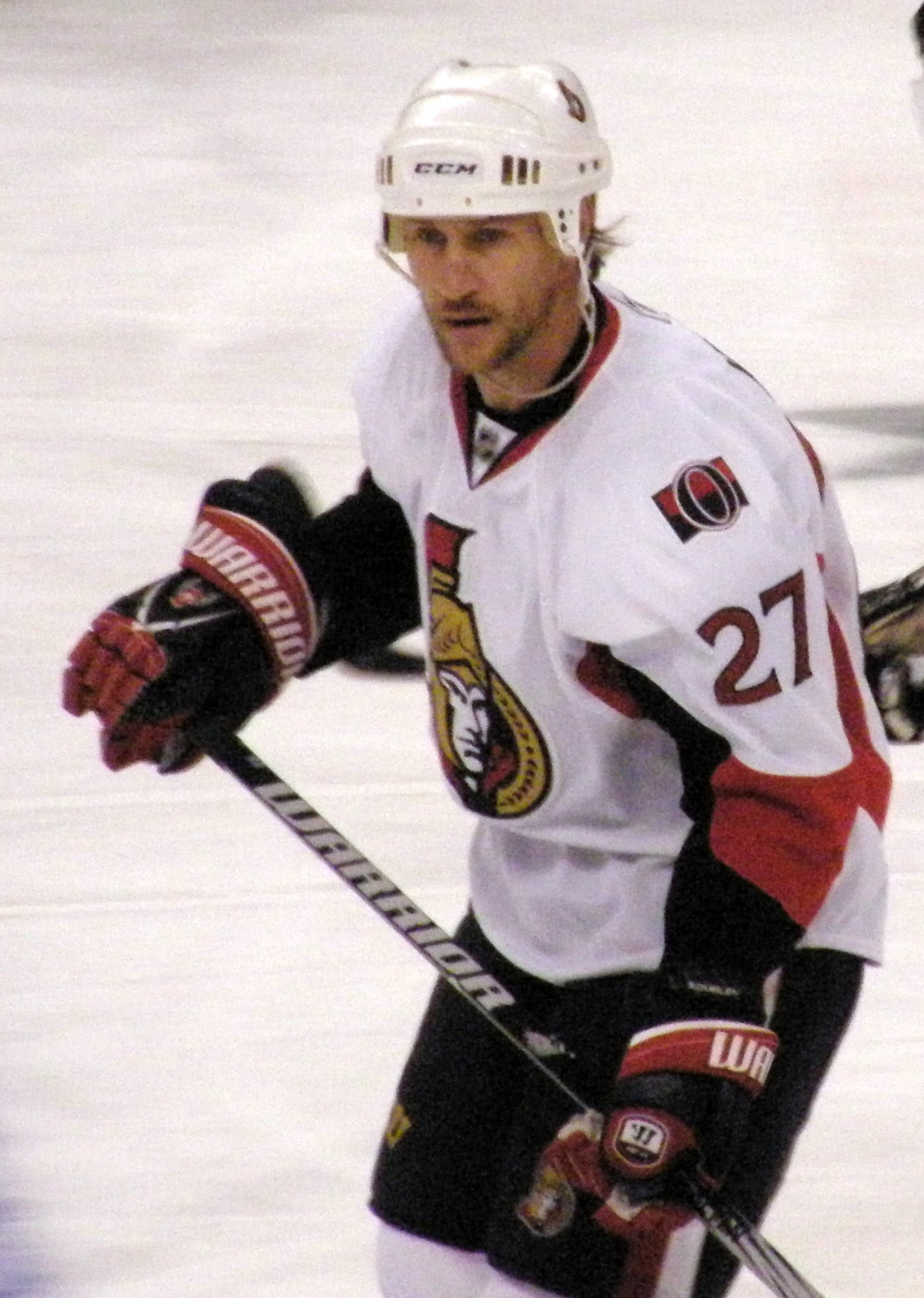
Kovalev with the Ottawa Senators.

On 6 July 2009, Kovalev signed a two-year, $10 million contract with the Ottawa Senators as an unrestricted free agent. On 25 December 2009, Kovalev was excluded from the main roster for the Russian team for the 2010 Winter Olympics, to the surprise of fellow countryman Evgeni Malkin (though he was selected as a reserve by Team Russia in case an injury occurred during the tournament). On 3 January 2010, Kovalev scored a career-high four goals in a 7–4 win against the Philadelphia Flyers.

On 22 November 2010, Kovalev netted his sixth goal of the season, scoring his 1,000th point in his career, notching the goal at exactly 10:00 of the first period against the Los Angeles Kings.

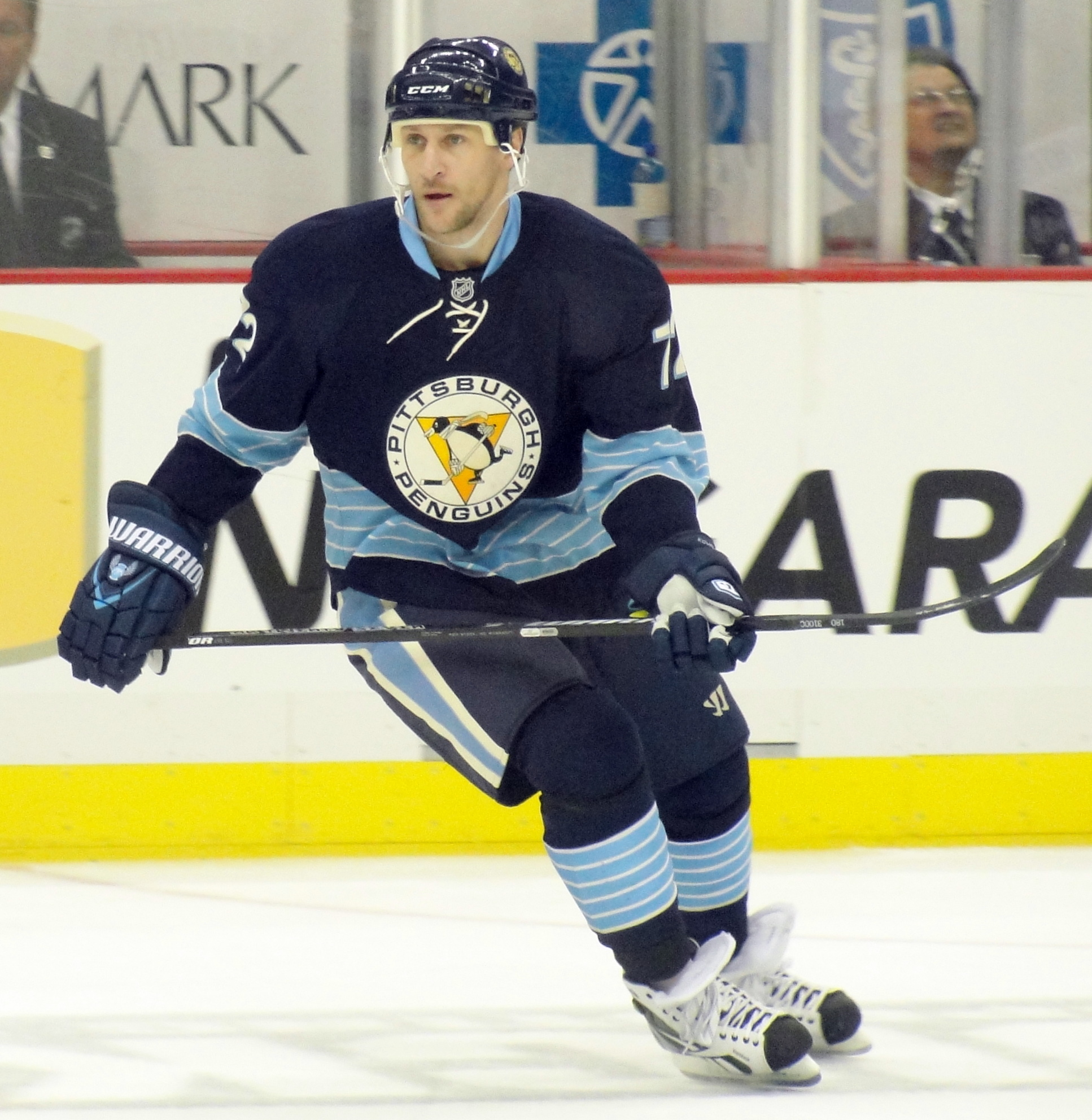
Kovalev during his second tenure with the Penguins in March 2011.

On 24 February 2011, his 38th birthday, Kovalev waived his no-trade clause to be traded back to the Pittsburgh Penguins in exchange for a conditional seventh-round draft pick. The pick would have been upgraded to the sixth round if the Penguins had reached the second round of the playoffs, which they did not. At the time of the trade, the Penguins were without 12 of their regular players, including Sidney Crosby and Evgeni Malkin. Upon his return to Pittsburgh, Kovalev took up jersey number 72, as his original jersey number 27 was already in use by Craig Adams.

Kovalev's return to Pittsburgh was brief, as General Manager Ray Shero announced on 28 May 2011, that he had no intention of re-signing the underachieving forward.

After failing to sign with an NHL team for the 2011–12 season, Kovalev returned to Russia to play with the Atlant Moscow Oblast in the Kontinental Hockey League (KHL). In June 2012, he was released from the two-year deal he signed with Atlant Moscow Oblast, at which point he declared his desire to return to the NHL. "Hopefully, I'll find an NHL team," Kovalev told the Montreal Gazette.

After the 2012–13 NHL lockout, Kovalev was given a tryout by the Florida Panthers, eventually signing a one-year contract with the team. "You could see how talented they are and they want to be in this League. All I want to do is help them. …I know I can match anyone in this locker room. I can still play this game," Kovalev said about the Panthers. In his first game as a Panther, Kovalev scored a goal and recorded two assists, one of the latter of which was an assist on teammate Jonathan Huberdeau's first career NHL goal.

On 21 March 2013, Kovalev officially announced his retirement from professional hockey. At that point, he had not played for the Panthers since a loss to the Pittsburgh Penguins on 22 February.

However, Kovalev's retirement lasted less than three months. Swiss National League B (NLB) team EHC Visp announced on 10 June 2013, that they had signed him to a one-year contract with an option for a second year. He appeared in 44 regular season games, notching 22 goals and 30 assists for 52 points and winning Swiss NLB championship.

On 3 July 2014, Kovalev again announced his retirement from professional hockey at the age of 41.

On 30 January 2016, Kovalev revealed that he was yet again considering a return to professional ice hockey in the NHL. He referenced Jaromír Jágr, who is of similar age to him, as his reason to believe a comeback was possible. A team specifically mentioned was the Canadiens, however no team reached out to him.

Kovalev made a return to professional ice hockey on 18 October 2016, playing again for EHC Visp, the team he has become general manager of, after forward William Rapuzzi became injured before the day of the game. Kovalev gathered an assist on a goal by Jon Rheault, and finished the game with 14 penalty minutes, after receiving a game misconduct and being ejected from the game in the third period, for a hit from behind. Kovalev had been taking part in team practices since the beginning of the season.

== Coaching career ==
In March 2016, it was announced that Kovalev has signed with EHC Visp of the Swiss National League B to become general manager of the club.

Kovalev was hired as an assistant coach for HC Kunlun Red Star of the Kontinental Hockey League (KHL) in 2018. He was named head coach in 2020.

== Accomplishments ==
- First Soviet player to be drafted in the first round; 15th Overall, First Round, 1991
- One of the first four Russian players (along with Alexander Karpovtsev, Sergei Nemchinov, and Sergei Zubov) to have his name engraved on the Stanley Cup;
- First Russian player to be a captain of an All-Star Team;
- Captain of the 2009 NHL Eastern Conference All-Star Team;
- Most Valuable Player of the 2009 NHL All-Star Game;
- 23 November 2010, recorded 1,000th (and 1,001st) career point(s) against the Los Angeles Kings, scoring a goal and an assist;
- Most NHL games played by a player born and trained in the Soviet Union (1,316).

== Personal life ==
At the age of eight, Kovalev himself was diagnosed with a heart disorder that prevented him from playing hockey for two years while he underwent treatment.

Kovalev is a licensed aircraft pilot. He has a step-sister, Adel Bukary, and a brother, Maxim Kovalev.

== Charity work ==
In October 2006, he unveiled the Kovy's Kids Suite at the Bell Centre to give children with heart conditions the opportunity to attend hockey games at the Bell Centre. In March 2008, Kovalev released a two-disc DVD titled My Hockey Tips and Training Methods. He donated 100 percent of the DVD sale profits to charities that promote cardiac care for children.

== Career statistics ==
=== Regular season and playoffs ===
			Regular season					Playoffs
Season	Team	League	GP	G	A	Pts	PIM	GP	G	A	Pts	PIM
1989–90	Dynamo Moscow	USSR	1	0	0	0	0	—	—	—	—	—
1990–91	Dynamo Moscow	USSR	18	1	2	3	4	—	—	—	—	—
1990–91	Dynamo–2 Moscow	USSR-3	21	16	9	25	20	—	—	—	—	—
1991–92	Dynamo Moscow	CIS	26	16	8	24	16	7	1	1	2	4
1991–92	Dynamo–2 Moscow	CIS-3	4	5	0	5	12	—	—	—	—	—
1992–93	New York Rangers	NHL	65	20	18	38	79	—	—	—	—	—
1992–93	Binghamton Rangers	AHL	13	13	11	24	35	9	3	5	8	14
1993–94	New York Rangers	NHL	76	23	33	56	154	23	9	12	21	18
1994–95	Lada Togliatti	IHL	12	8	8	16	49	—	—	—	—	—
1994–95	New York Rangers	NHL	48	13	15	28	30	10	4	7	11	10
1995–96	New York Rangers	NHL	81	24	34	58	98	11	3	4	7	14
1996–97	New York Rangers	NHL	45	13	22	35	42	—	—	—	—	—
1997–98	New York Rangers	NHL	73	23	30	53	44	—	—	—	—	—
1998–99	New York Rangers	NHL	14	3	4	7	12	—	—	—	—	—
1998–99	Pittsburgh Penguins	NHL	63	20	26	46	37	10	5	7	12	14
1999–00	Pittsburgh Penguins	NHL	82	26	40	66	94	11	1	5	6	10
2000–01	Pittsburgh Penguins	NHL	79	44	51	95	96	18	5	5	10	16
2001–02	Pittsburgh Penguins	NHL	67	32	44	76	80	—	—	—	—	—
2002–03	Pittsburgh Penguins	NHL	54	27	37	64	50	—	—	—	—	—
2002–03	New York Rangers	NHL	24	10	3	13	20	—	—	—	—	—
2003–04	New York Rangers	NHL	66	13	29	42	54	—	—	—	—	—
2003–04	Montreal Canadiens	NHL	12	1	2	3	12	11	6	4	10	8
2004–05	Ak Bars Kazan	RSL	35	10	12	22	80	4	0	0	0	8
2005–06	Montreal Canadiens	NHL	69	23	42	65	76	6	4	3	7	4
2006–07	Montreal Canadiens	NHL	73	18	29	47	78	—	—	—	—	—
2007–08	Montreal Canadiens	NHL	82	35	49	84	70	12	5	6	11	8
2008–09	Montreal Canadiens	NHL	78	26	39	65	74	4	2	1	3	2
2009–10	Ottawa Senators	NHL	77	18	31	49	54	—	—	—	—	—
2010–11	Ottawa Senators	NHL	54	14	13	27	28	—	—	—	—	—
2010–11	Pittsburgh Penguins	NHL	20	2	5	7	16	7	1	1	2	10
2011–12	Atlant Moscow Oblast	KHL	22	1	5	6	16	—	—	—	—	—
2012–13	Florida Panthers	NHL	14	2	3	5	6	—	—	—	—	—
2013–14	EHC Visp	NLB	44	22	30	52	82	11	7	8	15	37
2016–17	EHC Visp	NLB	11	3	7	10	24	—	—	—	—	—
NHL totals			1,316	430	599	1,029	1,304	123	45	55	100	114

=== International ===
Medal record

Ice hockey

Representing Russia

Olympic Games
Bronze medal – third place	2002 Salt Lake City	

World Championships
Bronze medal – third place	2005 Austria	

Representing Unified Team

Winter Olympics
Gold medal – first place	1992 Albertville	

World Junior Championship

Representing CIS
Gold medal – first place	1992 Germany	

European Junior Championship
Silver medal – second place	1991 Czechoslovakia	
Silver medal – second place	1990 Sweden	

Year	Team	Event	GP	G	A	Pts	PIM
1990	Soviet Union	EJC	6	4	3	7	6
1991	Soviet Union	EJC	6	8	3	11	22
1992	CIS	WJC	7	5	5	10	2
1992	Unified Team	OLY	8	1	2	3	14
1992	Russia	WC	6	0	1	1	0
1996	Russia	WCH	5	2	1	3	8
1998	Russia	WC	6	5	2	7	14
2002	Russia	OLY	6	3	1	4	4
2004	Russia	WCH	4	2	1	3	4
2005	Russia	WC	9	3	4	7	16
2006	Russia	OLY	8	4	2	6	4
Junior totals			19	17	11	28	30
Senior totals			52	20	14	34	64

== Awards and achievements ==
=== NHL ===
- NHL All-Star Game – 2001, 2003, 2009
- NHL Second All-Star Team – 2008
- NHL All-Star Game MVP Award – 2009
- The Hockey News – Saku Koivu Award (Comeback Player of the Year): 2008
- Stanley Cup champion – 1994 (New York Rangers)
- NHL's First Star of the Month – (February 2001)
- NHL's First Star of the Week – (30 March – 5 April 2009)
- NHL's Offensive Player of the Week – (6–12 November 2000); (5–11 November 2001).
- Molson Cup Award (monthly) winner – November 2005, November 2007 to February 2008.
- Molson Cup Award (season) winner – 2008

=== International ===
- 1992 Winter Olympics – Gold Medal (Ice Hockey)
- 2002 Winter Olympics – Bronze Medal (Ice Hockey)
- 2005 IIHF World Championship – Best Forward

== Transactions ==
- 23 June 1991 — New York Rangers first-round draft choice (15th overall) in the NHL Entry Draft.
- 25 November 1998 — Traded by the New York Rangers, along with Harry York, to the Pittsburgh Penguins in exchange for Petr Nedvěd, Sean Pronger and Chris Tamer.
- 10 February 2003 — Traded by the Pittsburgh Penguins, along with Mike Wilson, Janne Laukkanen and Dan LaCouture, to the New York Rangers in exchange for Joel Bouchard, Richard Lintner, Rico Fata, Mikael Samuelsson and a fourth-round draft pick.
- 2 March 2004 — Traded by the New York Rangers to the Montreal Canadiens in exchange for Jozef Balej and Montreal's 2004 second-round draft choice.
- 6 July 2009 — Signed a two-year $9.95 million deal with the Ottawa Senators.
- 24 February 2011 — Traded by the Ottawa Senators to the Pittsburgh Penguins for Pittsburgh's conditional 7th round draft pick in the 2011 NHL Draft.
- 18 January 2013 — Signed a one-year, $1 million (+300K signing bonus) contract with the Florida Panthers.

== See also ==
- List of NHL players with 1,000 games played
- List of NHL players with 1,000 points

Awards and achievements
Preceded by Michael Stewart	New York Rangers first-round draft pick 1991	Succeeded by Peter Ferraro
