= IIHF European Junior Championships =

Former international junior ice hockey tournament

- Status: defunct
- Genre: sports event
- Date: March–April
- Frequency: annual
- Location: various
- Inaugurated: 1967
- Most recent: 1998
- Organiser: IIHF

The IIHF European Junior Championships were an annual ice hockey tournament organized by the International Ice Hockey Federation and held from 1968 to 1998, with an unofficial tournament being held in 1967. The tournament was played as a U19 tournament from 1968 to 1976. In 1977, the IIHF created the IIHF World Junior Championships, and the U19 championships became U18. The tournament was dominated by the Russians (and Soviets), Czechs (and Czechoslovaks), Swedes and Finns, winning all but two of the medals in the 31 years it was held.

The U18 Championships remained strong until 1999, when the new IIHF World U18 Championships were introduced, thus rendering the U18 European Championships redundant. Two European Divisions continued until 2000, but were tiered qualifiers, alongside Asian Divisions, with promotion and relegation to the World Group B.

== Champions ==
=== U19 ===
Year	Gold	Silver	Bronze	Host
1967 (unofficial)	Soviet Union	Finland	Sweden	Yaroslavl, Russian SFSR, Soviet Union
1968	Czechoslovakia	Soviet Union	Sweden	Tampere, Finland
1969	Soviet Union	Sweden	Czechoslovakia	Garmisch-Partenkirchen, Bavaria, West Germany
1970	Soviet Union	Czechoslovakia	Sweden	Geneva, Switzerland
1971	Soviet Union	Sweden	Czechoslovakia	Prešov, Slovak SR, Czechoslovakia
1972	Sweden	Soviet Union	Czechoslovakia	Boden, Luleå, Skellefteå, Sweden
1973	Soviet Union	Sweden	Czechoslovakia	Leningrad, Russian SFSR, Soviet Union
1974	Sweden	Soviet Union	Finland	Herisau, Appenzell Ausserrhoden, Switzerland
1975	Soviet Union	Czechoslovakia	Sweden	Grenoble, France
1976	Soviet Union	Sweden	Finland	Kopřivnice, Opava, Czech SR, Czechoslovakia

=== U18 ===
Year	Gold	Silver	Bronze	Host
1977	Sweden	Czechoslovakia	Soviet Union	Bremerhaven, Bremen, West Germany
1978	Finland	Soviet Union	Sweden	Helsinki, Vantaa, Finland
1979	Czechoslovakia	Finland	Soviet Union	Tychy, Katowice, Poland
1980	Soviet Union	Czechoslovakia	Sweden	Hradec Králové, Czech SR, Czechoslovakia
1981	Soviet Union	Czechoslovakia	Sweden	Minsk, Belorussian SSR, Soviet Union
1982	Sweden	Czechoslovakia	Soviet Union	Ängelholm, Tyringe, Sweden
1983	Soviet Union	Finland	Czechoslovakia	Oslo, Norway
1984	Soviet Union	Czechoslovakia	Sweden	Rosenheim, Garmisch-Partenkirchen, Füssen, Bad Tölz, Bavaria, West Germany
1985	Sweden	Soviet Union	Czechoslovakia	Anglet, France
1986	Finland	Sweden	Czechoslovakia	Düsseldorf, Ratingen, Krefeld, North Rhine-Westphalia, West Germany
1987	Sweden	Czechoslovakia	Soviet Union	Tampere, Kouvola, Hämeenlinna, Finland
1988	Czechoslovakia	Finland	Soviet Union	Frýdek-Místek, Vsetín, Olomouc, Přerov, Czech SR, Czechoslovakia
1989	Soviet Union	Czechoslovakia	Finland	Kyiv, Ukrainian SSR, Soviet Union
1990	Sweden	Soviet Union	Czechoslovakia	Örnsköldsvik, Sollefteå, Sweden
1991	Czechoslovakia	Soviet Union	Finland	Spišská Nová Ves, Prešov, Slovak SR, Czechoslovakia
1992	Czechoslovakia	Sweden	Russia	Lillehammer, Hamar, Norway
1993	Sweden	Russia	Czech Republic	Nowy Targ, Oświęcim, Poland
1994	Sweden	Russia	Czech Republic	Jyväskylä, Finland
1995	Finland	Germany	Sweden	Berlin, Germany
1996	Russia	Finland	Sweden	Ufa, Russia
1997	Finland	Sweden	Switzerland	Znojmo, Třebíč, Czech Republic
1998	Sweden	Finland	Russia	Malung, Mora, Sweden

== Medal table ==
Country	(gold) Gold	(silver) Silver	(bronze) Bronze	Medals
Russia; Soviet Union	1; 11; 12	2; 7; 9	2; 5; 7	5; 23; 28
Sweden	10	7	9	26
Czech Republic; Czechoslovakia	0; 5; 5	0; 9; 9	2; 8; 10	2; 22; 24
Finland	4	5	4	13
Germany	0	1	0	1
Switzerland	0	0	1	1

== Medals 1968-1998 (Including Precursors) ==
Exclude 1967 European U19 Championship.

Rank	Nation	Gold	Silver	Bronze	Total
1	Russia	12	9	7	28
2	Sweden	10	7	9	26
3	Czech Republic	5	9	10	24
4	Finland	4	5	4	13
5	Germany	0	1	0	1
6	Switzerland	0	0	1	1
Totals (6 entries)		31	31	31	93

== European Division I (Qualifier for World Group B) ==
Year	Gold	Silver	Bronze	Host
1999	Latvia	Slovenia	Lithuania	Romania
2000	Kazakhstan	Estonia	Slovenia	Slovenia

== Overall participation totals ==
Over the history of the tournament there were 31 'A', 30 'B', 21 'C', and 4 'D' championships
In 1976 Group 'A' grew from six members to eight.

Team	Group A	Group B	Group C	Group D	Total
Austria	1	25	3	—	29
Belarus	2	3	1	—	6
Belgium	–	1	9	1	11
Bulgaria	1	13	8	4	26
Croatia	—	–	4	1	5
Czech Republic	6	—	—	—	6
Czechoslovakia	25	—	—	—	25
Denmark	–	27	1	—	28
East Germany	1	–	1	—	2
Estonia	—	–	6	–	6
Finland	31	—	—	—	31
France	5	22	—	—	27
Germany	27	3	—	—	30
Great Britain	–	5	15	–	20
Greece	—	—	—	1	1
Hungary	–	17	10	—	27
Iceland	—	—	–	2	2
Israel	—	–	–	4	4
Italy	2	24	1	—	25
Kazakhstan	–	–	–	1	1
Latvia	–	–	6	—	6
Lithuania	–	–	5	1	6
Luxembourg	—	—	–	1	1
Netherlands	1	14	6	3	24
Norway	16	13	—	—	29
Poland	18	13	—	—	31
Romania	4	23	2	–	29
Russia	7	—	—	—	7
Serbia and Montenegro	—	—	1	3	4
Slovakia	3	1	2	—	6
Slovenia	–	1	5	—	6
Soviet Union	24	—	—	—	24
Spain	—	7	10	2	19
Sweden	31	—	—	—	31
Switzerland	24	5	—	—	29
Turkey	—	—	–	3	3
Ukraine	2	1	3	—	6
Yugoslavia	–	22	1	—	23

- Former nations are italicized and listed separately from nations that continued in their stead.
- In Group A participation totals include withdrawals (or forfeitures) by Bulgaria, Poland and Romania. Likewise Greece's only appearance is listed despite not being official because of forfeit.

== See also ==
- European Ice Hockey Championships
- Ice Hockey European Championships
- European Curling Championships
- European Bandy Championships
- IIHF European Women Championships
- Euro Hockey Tour
- IIHF World Junior Championship (U20)
- IIHF World U18 Championship
- IIHF World Women's U18 Championship
- World U-17 Hockey Challenge
- World Junior A Challenge
- IIHF Asian Oceanic U18 Championships
- IIHF Asia and Oceania Championship
- IIHF European Women's Champions Cup
- European Women's Hockey League
- 2023–24 Euro Hockey Tour (women)
- Euro Hockey Challenge
- Euro Ice Hockey Challenge
- IIHF European Cup (1965–1996)
- European Hockey League (1996–2000)
- Champions Hockey League (2008–09)
- European Trophy (2010–2013)
- Champions Hockey League (Since 2014)
- IIHF Continental Cup
- Junior Club World Cup
