= East Germany men's national under-18 ice hockey team =

East Germany
- IIHF code: GDR

First international
- Finland 10–1 East Germany (Yaroslavl, Soviet Union; 1967)

Biggest win
- East Germany 16–0 Bulgaria (Sofia, Bulgaria; 1990)

Biggest defeat
- Sweden 21–1 East Germany (Tampere, Finland; 1968)

The East Germany national under-18 ice hockey team was the men's national under-18 ice hockey team in East Germany. It ceased to exist after the Reunification of Germany in 1990.

The team made two appearances at the IIHF European Junior Championships, finishing 6th in 1968 and winning Group C in 1990. They also participated at the unofficial 1967 European U19 Championship.

== International competitions ==
=== IIHF European U18/U19 Championships ===
- 1967 (unofficial): 3rd in Group B
- 1968: 6th place
- 1969-1989: did not participate
- 1990: 1st in Group C
