= Soviet Union men's national under-18 ice hockey team =

National ice hockey team of the Soviet Union

Soviet Union (USSR / СССР)
- IIHF code: URS
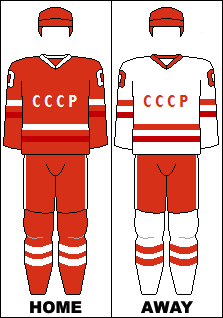

Medal record

IIHF European Junior Championships
Gold medal – first place	1967 Soviet Union	
Gold medal – first place	1969 West Germany	
Gold medal – first place	1970 Switzerland	
Gold medal – first place	1971 Czechoslovakia	
Gold medal – first place	1973 Soviet Union	
Gold medal – first place	1975 France	
Gold medal – first place	1976 Czechoslovakia	
Gold medal – first place	1980 Czechoslovakia	
Gold medal – first place	1981 Soviet Union	
Gold medal – first place	1983 Norway	
Gold medal – first place	1984 West Germany	
Gold medal – first place	1989 Soviet Union	
Silver medal – second place	1968 Finland	
Silver medal – second place	1972 Sweden	
Silver medal – second place	1974 France	
Silver medal – second place	1978 Finland	
Silver medal – second place	1985 France	
Silver medal – second place	1990 Sweden	
Silver medal – second place	1991 Czechoslovakia	
Bronze medal – third place	1977 West Germany	
Bronze medal – third place	1979 Poland	
Bronze medal – third place	1982 Sweden	
Bronze medal – third place	1987 Finland	
Bronze medal – third place	1988 Czechoslovakia	

The Soviet Union men's national under-18 ice hockey team was the men's national under-18 ice hockey team in the Soviet Union. It was succeeded by the Russia men's national under-18 ice hockey team in 1992.

The team won a total of 23 medals at the IIHF European Junior Championships, including 11 gold, seven silver, and five bronze medals. They also won gold at the unofficial 1967 European U19 Championship.

== International competitions ==
=== IIHF European U18/U19 Championships ===
- 1967 (unofficial): (gold) 1st place
- 1968: (silver) 2nd place
- 1969: (gold) 1st place
- 1970: (gold) 1st place
- 1971: (gold) 1st place
- 1972: (silver) 2nd place
- 1973: (gold) 1st place
- 1974: (silver) 2nd place
- 1975: (gold) 1st place
- 1976: (gold) 1st place
- 1977: (bronze) 3rd place
- 1978: (silver) 2nd place
- 1979: (bronze) 3rd place
- 1980: (gold) 1st place
- 1981: (gold) 1st place
- 1982: (bronze) 3rd place
- 1983: (gold) 1st place
- 1984: (gold) 1st place
- 1985: (silver) 2nd place
- 1986: 4th place
- 1987: (bronze) 3rd place
- 1988: (bronze) 3rd place
- 1989: (gold) 1st place
- 1990: (silver) 2nd place
- 1991: (silver) 2nd place
