= Sweden men's national under-18 ice hockey team =

Men's national under-18 ice hockey team representing Sweden

Sweden
- Nickname: Småkronorna (The Small Crowns)
- Association: Swedish Ice Hockey Association
- Top scorer: William Nylander (16)
- Team colors
- IIHF code: SWE

IIHF World U18 Championship
- Appearances: 24 (first in 1999)
- Best result: Gold: 3 - 2019, 2022, 2026

Medal record

World U18 Championships
Gold medal – first place	2019 Sweden	
Gold medal – first place	2022 Germany	
Gold medal – first place	2026 Slovakia	
Silver medal – second place	1999 Germany	
Silver medal – second place	2010 Belarus	
Silver medal – second place	2011 Germany	
Silver medal – second place	2012 Czech Republic	
Silver medal – second place	2016 USA	
Silver medal – second place	2023 Switzerland	
Silver medal – second place	2025 United States	
Bronze medal – third place	2000 Switzerland	
Bronze medal – third place	2005 Czech Republic	
Bronze medal – third place	2007 Finland	
Bronze medal – third place	2018 Russia	
Bronze medal – third place	2021 USA	
Bronze medal – third place	2024 Finland	

Hlinka Gretzky Cup
Gold medal – first place	2007	
Silver medal – second place	2011	
Silver medal – second place	2015	
Silver medal – second place	2018	
Silver medal – second place	2025	
Bronze medal – third place	2004	
Bronze medal – third place	2008	
Bronze medal – third place	2009	
Bronze medal – third place	2010	
Bronze medal – third place	2012	
Bronze medal – third place	2017	
Bronze medal – third place	2019	
Bronze medal – third place	2024	

World U-17 Hockey Challenge
Gold medal – first place	2013 Canada	
Gold medal – first place	2016 Canada	
Silver medal – second place	1988 Canada	
Silver medal – second place	1997 Canada	
Bronze medal – third place	2010 Canada	
Bronze medal – third place	2014 Canada	
Bronze medal – third place	2015 Canada	
Bronze medal – third place	2018 Canada	

IIHF European Junior Championships
Gold medal – first place	1972 Sweden	
Gold medal – first place	1974 Switzerland	
Gold medal – first place	1977 West Germany	
Gold medal – first place	1982 Sweden	
Gold medal – first place	1985 France	
Gold medal – first place	1987 Finland	
Gold medal – first place	1990 Sweden	
Gold medal – first place	1993 Poland	
Gold medal – first place	1994 Finland	
Gold medal – first place	1998 Sweden	
Silver medal – second place	1969 West Germany	
Silver medal – second place	1971 Czechoslovakia	
Silver medal – second place	1973 Soviet Union	
Silver medal – second place	1976 Czechoslovakia	
Silver medal – second place	1986 Finland	
Silver medal – second place	1992 Norway	
Bronze medal – third place	1967 Soviet union	
Bronze medal – third place	1968 Finland	
Bronze medal – third place	1970 Switzerland	
Bronze medal – third place	1970 France	
Bronze medal – third place	1978 Finland	
Bronze medal – third place	1980 Czechoslovakia	
Bronze medal – third place	1981 Soviet Union	
Bronze medal – third place	1984 West Germany	
Bronze medal – third place	1995 Germany	
Bronze medal – third place	1996 Russia	

The Sweden men's national under-18 ice hockey team or Småkronorna (Small Crowns in Swedish) is the men's national under-18 ice hockey team of Sweden. The team is controlled by the Swedish Ice Hockey Association, a member of the International Ice Hockey Federation. The team represents Sweden at the IIHF World U18 Championships and the Hlinka Gretzky Cup. Sweden won its first gold medal in 2019.

== International competitions ==
=== IIHF European U18/U19 Championships ===
- 1967 (unofficial): (bronze) 3rd place
- 1968: (bronze) Bronze
- 1969: (silver) Silver
- 1970: (bronze) Bronze
- 1971: (silver) Silver
- 1972: (gold) Gold
- 1973: (silver) Silver
- 1974: (gold) Gold
- 1975: (bronze) Bronze
- 1976: (silver) Silver
- 1977: (gold) Gold
- 1978: (bronze) Bronze
- 1979: 4th place
- 1980: (bronze) Bronze
- 1981: (bronze) Bronze
- 1982: (gold) Gold
- 1983: 4th place
- 1984: (bronze) Bronze
- 1985: (gold) Gold
- 1986: (silver) Silver
- 1987: (gold) Gold
- 1988: 4th place
- 1989: 4th place
- 1990: (gold) Gold
- 1991: 4th place
- 1992: (silver) Silver
- 1993: (gold) Gold
- 1994: (gold) Gold
- 1995: (bronze) Bronze
- 1996: (bronze) Bronze
- 1997: (silver) Silver
- 1998: (gold) Gold

=== IIHF World U18 Championships ===
- 1999: (silver) Silver
- 2000: (bronze) Bronze
- 2001: 7th place
- 2002: 9th place
- 2003: 5th place
- 2004: 5th place
- 2005: (bronze) Bronze
- 2006: 6th place
- 2007: (bronze) Bronze
- 2008: 4th place
- 2009: 5th place
- 2010: (silver) Silver
- 2011: (silver) Silver
- 2012: (silver) Silver
- 2013: 5th place
- 2014: 4th place
- 2015: 8th place
- 2016: (silver) Silver
- 2017: 4th place
- 2018: (bronze) Bronze
- 2019: (gold) Gold
- 2020: Cancelled due to the COVID-19 pandemic
- 2021: (bronze) Bronze
- 2022: (gold) Gold
- 2023: (silver) Silver
- 2024: (bronze) Bronze
- 2025: (silver) Silver
- 2026: (gold) Gold
