= Bulgaria men's national under-18 ice hockey team =

The Bulgaria men's national under-18 ice hockey team is the men's national under-18 ice hockey team of Bulgaria. The team is controlled by the Bulgarian Ice Hockey Federation, a member of the International Ice Hockey Federation. The team represents Bulgaria at the IIHF World U18 Championships.

== International competitions ==
=== IIHF World U18 Championships ===
- 1999: 6th in Division II Europe
- 2000: 6th in Division II Europe
- 2001: 6th in Division III
- 2002: 7th in Division III
- 2003: 6th in Division II Group A
- 2004: 4th in Division III
- 2005: 6th in Division III
- 2006: 5th in Division III
- 2007: Did not qualify
- 2008: 4th in Division III Group B
- 2009: 4th in Division III Group B
- 2010: 4th in Division III Group A
- 2011: 3rd in Division III Group A
- 2012: 4th in Division III
- 2013: 4th in Division III Group A
- 2014: 4th in Division III Group A
- 2015: 3rd in Division III Group A
- 2016: 3rd in Division III Group A
- 2017: 4th in Division III Group A
- 2018: 3rd in Division III Group A
- 2019: 1st in Division III Group A
- 2020: Cancelled due to the COVID-19 pandemic
- 2021: Cancelled due to the COVID-19 pandemic
- 2022: 4th in Division II Group B
- 2023: 4th in Division II Group B
