= Hungary men's national under-18 ice hockey team =

The Hungary men's national under-18 ice hockey team is the men's national under-18 ice hockey team of Hungary. The team is controlled by the Hungarian Ice Hockey Federation, a member of the International Ice Hockey Federation. The team represents Hungary at the IIHF World U18 Championships.

== International competitions ==
=== IIHF World U18 Championships ===
- 1999: 7th in Pool B
- 2000: 4th in Division I Europe
- 2001: 7th in Division II
- 2002: 6th in Division II
- 2003: 2nd in Division II Group B
- 2004: 2nd in Division II Group A
- 2005: 1st in Division II Group A
- 2006: 6th in Division I Group A
- 2007: 2nd in Division II Group A
- 2008: 1st in Division II Group B
- 2009: 3rd in Division I Group A
- 2010: 2nd in Division I Group B
- 2011: 4th in Division I Group A
- 2012: 6th in Division I Group B
- 2013: 1st in Division II Group A
- 2014: 1st in Division I Group B
- 2015: 6th in Division I Group A
- 2016: 1st in Division I Group B
- 2017: 6th in Division I Group A
- 2018: 3rd in Division I Group B
- 2019: 3rd in Division I Group B
- 2020:Cancelled due to the coronavirus pandemic
- 2021:Cancelled due to the coronavirus pandemic
- 2022: 1st in Division I Group B
- 2023: 4th in Division I Group A
- 2024: 4th in Division I Group A
- 2025: 5th in Division I Group A
- 2026: 4th in Division I Group A
