= Yugoslavia men's national under-18 ice hockey team =

The Yugoslavia men's national under-18 ice hockey team was the men's national under-18 ice hockey team in the Socialist Federal Republic of Yugoslavia. It was succeeded by the Serbia and Montenegro men's national under-18 ice hockey team.

== International competitions ==
=== IIHF European U18/U19 Championships ===
- 1969: 3rd in Group B
- 1970: 6th in Group B
- 1971: did not participate
- 1972: 3rd in Group B
- 1973: 3rd in Group B
- 1974: 6th in Group B
- 1975: 3rd in Group B
- 1976: 2nd in Group B
- 1977: 2nd in Group B
- 1978: 4th in Group B
- 1979: 3rd in Group B
- 1980: 2nd in Group B
- 1981: 3rd in Group B
- 1982: 8th in Group B
- 1983: 1st in Group C
- 1984: 7th in Group B
- 1985: 7th in Group B
- 1986: 6th in Group B
- 1987: 5th in Group B
- 1988: 3rd in Group B
- 1989: 7th in Group B
- 1990: 4th in Group B
- 1991: 2nd in Group B
- 1992: 8th in Group B
