= Czechoslovakia men's national under-18 ice hockey team =

May 20th, 1996. Philadelphia PA

The Czechoslovakia men's national under-18 ice hockey team was the men's under-18 ice hockey team that represented Czechoslovakia at international competitions. It was succeeded by the Czech Republic men's national under-18 ice hockey team in 1993.

The team won a total of 22 medals at the IIHF European Junior Championships, including five gold, nine silver, and eight bronze medals. They finished in 4th place at the unofficial 1967 European U19 Championship.

== International competitions ==
=== IIHF European U18/U19 Championships ===
- 1967 (unofficial): 4th place
- 1968: (gold) 1st place
- 1969: (bronze) 3rd place
- 1970: (silver) 2nd place
- 1971: (bronze) 3rd place
- 1972: (bronze) 3rd place
- 1973: (bronze) 3rd place
- 1974: 4th place
- 1975: (silver) 2nd place
- 1976: 4th place
- 1977: (silver) 2nd place
- 1978: 4th place
- 1979: (gold) 1st place
- 1980: (silver) 2nd place
- 1981: (silver) 2nd place
- 1982: (silver) 2nd place
- 1983: (bronze) 3rd place
- 1984: (silver) 2nd place
- 1985: (bronze) 3rd place
- 1986: (bronze) 3rd place
- 1987: (silver) 2nd place
- 1988: (gold) 1st place
- 1989: (silver) 2nd place
- 1990: (bronze) 3rd place
- 1991: (gold) 1st place
- 1992: (gold) 1st place
