= List of San Jose Sharks draft picks =

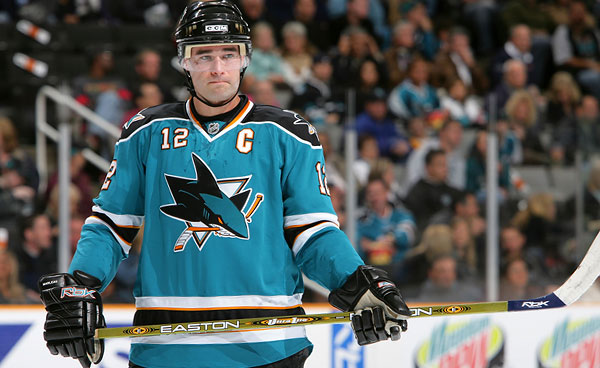
The Sharks selected Patrick Marleau second overall in the 1997 NHL entry draft.

This is a complete list of ice hockey players who were drafted in the National Hockey League Entry Draft by the San Jose Sharks franchise. It includes every player who was drafted, regardless of whether they played for the team. The Sharks came into existence in 1991 when the NHL expanded into northern California as a compromise to the owners of the Minnesota North Stars, who wanted to relocate the team into the area.

== Key ==
Played at least one game with the Sharks
Spent entire NHL career with the Sharks

General terms and abbreviations
Term or abbreviation	Definition
Draft	The year that the player was selected
Round	The round of the draft in which the player was selected
Pick	The overall position in the draft at which the player was selected
S	Supplemental draft selection

Position abbreviations
Abbreviation	Definition
G	Goaltender
D	Defense
LW	Left Wing
C	Center
RW	Right Wing
F	Forward

Abbreviations for statistical columns
Abbreviation	Definition
Pos	Position
GP	Games played
G	Goals
A	Assists
Pts	Points
PIM	Penalties in minutes
W	Wins
L	Losses
T	Ties
OT	Overtime/shootout losses
GAA	Goals against average
—	Does not apply

== Draft picks ==
Statistics are complete as of the 2025–26 NHL season and show each player's career regular season totals in the NHL. Wins, losses, ties, overtime losses and goals against average apply to goaltenders and are used only for players at that position.

Draft	Round	Pick	Player	Nationality	Pos	GP	G	A	Pts	PIM	W	L	T	OT	GAA
1991	1	2	Pat Falloon	Canada	RW	575	143	179	322	141	—	—	—	—	—
1991	2	23	Ray Whitney	Canada	LW	1330	385	679	1064	465	—	—	—	—	—
1991	2	30	Sandis Ozolinsh	Latvia	D	875	167	397	564	638	—	—	—	—	—
1991	3	45	Dody Wood	Canada	LW	106	8	10	18	471	—	—	—	—	—
1991	4	67	Kerry Toporowski	Canada	D	—	—	—	—	—	—	—	—	—	—
1991	5	89	Dan Ryder	Canada	G	—	—	—	—	—	—	—	—	—	—
1991	6	111	Fredrik Nilsson	Sweden	LW	—	—	—	—	—	—	—	—	—	—
1991	7	133	Jaroslav Otevrel	Czech Republic	LW	16	3	4	7	2	—	—	—	—	—
1991	8	155	Dean Grillo	United States	C	—	—	—	—	—	—	—	—	—	—
1991	9	177	Corwin Saurdiff	United States	G	—	—	—	—	—	—	—	—	—	—
1991	10	199	Dale Craigwell	Canada	C	98	11	18	29	28	—	—	—	—	—
1991	11	221	Aaron Kriss	United States	D	—	—	—	—	—	—	—	—	—	—
1991	12	243	Mikhail Kravets	Russia	RW	2	0	0	0	0	—	—	—	—	—
1991	S	1	Jeff McLean	Canada	C	6	1	0	1	0	—	—	—	—	—
1991	S	7	Mark Beaufait	United States	C	5	1	0	1	0	—	—	—	—	—
1992	1	3	Mike Rathje	Canada	D	768	30	150	180	491	—	—	—	—	—
1992	1	10	Andrei Nazarov	Russia	LW	571	53	71	124	1409	—	—	—	—	—
1992	3	51	Alexander Cherbayev	Russia	RW	—	—	—	—	—	—	—	—	—	—
1992	4	75	Jan Caloun	Czech Republic	RW	24	8	6	14	2	—	—	—	—	—
1992	5	99	Marcus Ragnarsson	Sweden	D	632	37	140	177	482	—	—	—	—	—
1992	6	123	Michal Sykora	Czech Republic	D	267	15	54	69	185	—	—	—	—	—
1992	7	147	Eric Bellerose	Canada	LW	—	—	—	—	—	—	—	—	—	—
1992	8	171	Ryan Smith	Canada	D	—	—	—	—	—	—	—	—	—	—
1992	9	195	Chris Burns	Canada	G	—	—	—	—	—	—	—	—	—	—
1992	10	219	Alex Kholomeyev	Russia	RW	—	—	—	—	—	—	—	—	—	—
1992	11	243	Viktors Ignatjev	Latvia	D	11	0	1	1	6	—	—	—	—	—
1992	S	3	Brian Konowalchuk	United States	C	—	—	—	—	—	—	—	—	—	—
1993	1	6	Viktor Kozlov	Russia	C	897	198	339	537	248	—	—	—	—	—
1993	2	28	Shean Donovan	Canada	RW	951	112	129	241	705	—	—	—	—	—
1993	2	45	Vlastimil Kroupa	Czech Republic	D	105	4	19	23	66	—	—	—	—	—
1993	3	58	Ville Peltonen	Finland	W	382	52	96	148	119	—	—	—	—	—
1993	4	80	Alexander Osadchy	Russia	D	—	—	—	—	—	—	—	—	—	—
1993	5	106	Andrei Buschan	Ukraine	D	—	—	—	—	—	—	—	—	—	—
1993	6	132	Petri Varis	Finland	LW	1	0	0	0	0	—	—	—	—	—
1993	6	154	Fredrik Oduya	Sweden	D	—	—	—	—	—	—	—	—	—	—
1993	7	158	Anatoli Filatov	Kazakhstan	F	—	—	—	—	—	—	—	—	—	—
1993	8	184	Todd Holt	Canada	RW	—	—	—	—	—	—	—	—	—	—
1993	9	210	Jonas Forsberg	Sweden	G	—	—	—	—	—	—	—	—	—	—
1993	10	236	Jeff Salajko	Canada	G	—	—	—	—	—	—	—	—	—	—
1993	11	262	Jamie Matthews	Canada	C	—	—	—	—	—	—	—	—	—	—
1993	S	2	Dean Sylvester	United States	RW	96	21	16	37	32	—	—	—	—	—
1994	1	11	Jeff Friesen	Canada	LW	893	218	298	516	488	—	—	—	—	—
1994	2	37	Angel Nikolov	Czech Republic	D	—	—	—	—	—	—	—	—	—	—
1994	3	66	Alexei Yegorov	Russia	RW	11	3	3	6	2	—	—	—	—	—
1994	4	89	Vaclav Varada	Czech Republic	LW	493	58	125	183	410	—	—	—	—	—
1994	5	115	Brian Swanson	United States	C	70	4	13	17	16	—	—	—	—	—
1994	6	141	Alexander Korolyuk	Russia	RW	296	62	80	142	140	—	—	—	—	—
1994	7	167	Sergei Gorbachev	Russia	F	—	—	—	—	—	—	—	—	—	—
1994	8	193	Eric Landry	Canada	RW	—	—	—	—	—	—	—	—	—	—
1994	9	219	Evgeni Nabokov	Russia	G	697	1	15	16	118	353	227	29	57	2.44
1994	10	240	Tomas Pisa	Czech Republic	LW	—	—	—	—	—	—	—	—	—	—
1994	10	245	Aniket Dhadphale	United States	LW	—	—	—	—	—	—	—	—	—	—
1994	11	271	David Beauregard	Canada	LW	—	—	—	—	—	—	—	—	—	—
1995	1	12	Teemu Riihijarvi	Finland	RW	—	—	—	—	—	—	—	—	—	—
1995	2	38	Peter Roed	United States	C	—	—	—	—	—	—	—	—	—	—
1995	3	64	Marko Makinen	Finland	LW	—	—	—	—	—	—	—	—	—	—
1995	4	90	Vesa Toskala	Finland	G	266	0	10	10	16	129	82	5	25	2.76
1995	5	116	Miikka Kiprusoff	Finland	G	624	0	10	10	47	319	213	7	64	2.49
1995	5	130	Michal Bros	Czech Republic	F	—	—	—	—	—	—	—	—	—	—
1995	6	140	Timo Hakanen	Finland	C	—	—	—	—	—	—	—	—	—	—
1995	6	142	Jaroslav Kudrna	Czech Republic	LW	—	—	—	—	—	—	—	—	—	—
1995	7	167	Brad Mehalko	Canada	LW	—	—	—	—	—	—	—	—	—	—
1995	7	168	Robert Jindrich	Czech Republic	D	—	—	—	—	—	—	—	—	—	—
1995	8	194	Ryan Kraft	United States	LW	7	0	1	1	0	—	—	—	—	—
1995	9	220	Mikko Markkanen	Finland	RW	—	—	—	—	—	—	—	—	—	—
1996	1	2	Andrei Zyuzin	Russia	D	496	38	82	120	446	—	—	—	—	—
1996	1	21	Marco Sturm	Germany	C	938	242	245	487	446	—	—	—	—	—
1996	3	55	Terry Friesen	Canada	G	—	—	—	—	—	—	—	—	—	—
1996	4	102	Matt Bradley	Canada	RW	675	59	90	149	562	—	—	—	—	—
1996	6	137	Michel Larocque	Canada	G	3	0	0	0	0	0	2	0	—	3.55
1996	7	164	Jake Deadmarsh	Canada	D	—	—	—	—	—	—	—	—	—	—
1996	8	191	Cory Cyrenne	Canada	C	—	—	—	—	—	—	—	—	—	—
1996	9	217	David Thibeault	Canada	LW	—	—	—	—	—	—	—	—	—	—
1997	1	2	Patrick Marleau	Canada	LW	1779	566	631	1197	527	—	—	—	—	—
1997	1	23	Scott Hannan	Canada	D	1055	38	179	217	625	—	—	—	—	—
1997	4	82	Adam Colagiacomo	Canada	RW	—	—	—	—	—	—	—	—	—	—
1997	5	107	Adam Spylo	Canada	RW	—	—	—	—	—	—	—	—	—	—
1997	7	163	Joe Dusbabek	United States	RW	—	—	—	—	—	—	—	—	—	—
1997	8	192	Cam Severson	Canada	LW	37	3	0	3	63	—	—	—	—	—
1997	9	219	Mark Smith	Canada	C	377	23	47	70	457	—	—	—	—	—
1998	1	3	Brad Stuart	Canada	D	1056	80	255	335	565	—	—	—	—	—
1998	2	29	Jonathan Cheechoo	Canada	RW	501	170	135	305	324	—	—	—	—	—
1998	3	65	Eric Laplante	Canada	LW	—	—	—	—	—	—	—	—	—	—
1998	4	98	Rob Davison	Canada	D	219	3	15	18	321	—	—	—	—	—
1998	4	104	Miroslav Zalesak	Slovakia	RW	12	1	2	3	0	—	—	—	—	—
1998	5	127	Brandon Coalter	Canada	LW	—	—	—	—	—	—	—	—	—	—
1998	5	145	Mikael Samuelsson	Sweden	RW	699	149	197	346	370	—	—	—	—	—
1998	7	185	Robert Mulick	Canada	D	—	—	—	—	—	—	—	—	—	—
1998	8	212	Jim Fahey	United States	D	92	1	24	25	67	—	—	—	—	—
1999	1	14	Jeff Jillson	United States	D	140	9	32	41	96	—	—	—	—	—
1999	3	82	Mark Concannon	United States	F	—	—	—	—	—	—	—	—	—	—
1999	4	111	Willie Levesque	United States	W	—	—	—	—	—	—	—	—	—	—
1999	5	155	Niko Dimitrakos	United States	W	158	24	38	62	95	—	—	—	—	—
1999	8	229	Eric Betournay	Canada	C	—	—	—	—	—	—	—	—	—	—
1999	8	241	Douglas Murray	Sweden	D	518	7	57	64	412	—	—	—	—	—
1999	9	257	Hannes Hyvonen	Finland	RW	42	4	5	9	22	—	—	—	—	—
2000	2	41	Tero Maatta	Finland	D	—	—	—	—	—	—	—	—	—	—
2000	4	104	Jon DiSalvatore	United States	LW	6	0	0	0	4	—	—	—	—	—
2000	5	142	Michal Pinc	Czech Republic	C	—	—	—	—	—	—	—	—	—	—
2000	5	166	Nolan Schaefer	Canada	G	7	0	0	0	2	5	1	—	0	1.88
2000	6	183	Michal Macho	Slovakia	RW	—	—	—	—	—	—	—	—	—	—
2000	8	246	Chad Wiseman	Canada	LW	9	1	1	2	8	—	—	—	—	—
2000	8	256	Pasi Saarinen	Finland	D	—	—	—	—	—	—	—	—	—	—
2001	1	20	Marcel Goc	Germany	C	636	75	113	188	157	—	—	—	—	—
2001	4	106	Christian Ehrhoff	Germany	D	789	74	265	339	517	—	—	—	—	—
2001	4	107	Dimitri Patzold	Germany	G	3	0	0	0	0	0	0	—	0	5.45
2001	5	140	Tomas Plihal	Czech Republic	LW	89	7	9	16	26	—	—	—	—	—
2001	6	175	Ryane Clowe	Canada	LW	491	112	197	309	618	—	—	—	—	—
2001	6	182	Tom Cavanagh	United States	C	18	1	2	3	4	—	—	—	—	—
2002	1	27	Mike Morris	United States	F	—	—	—	—	—	—	—	—	—	—
2002	2	52	Dan Spang	United States	D	—	—	—	—	—	—	—	—	—	—
2002	3	86	Jonas Fiedler	Czech Republic	RW	—	—	—	—	—	—	—	—	—	—
2002	5	139	Kris Newbury	Canada	C	76	4	6	10	139	—	—	—	—	—
2002	5	163	Tom Walsh	United States	D	—	—	—	—	—	—	—	—	—	—
2002	7	217	Tim Conboy	United States	RW	59	0	6	6	121	—	—	—	—	—
2002	9	288	Michael Hutchins	United States	D	—	—	—	—	—	—	—	—	—	—
2003	1	6	Milan Michalek	Czech Republic	LW	747	208	238	446	394	—	—	—	—	—
2003	1	16	Steve Bernier	Canada	RW	637	105	125	230	300	—	—	—	—	—
2003	2	43	Josh Hennessy	United States	C	23	1	0	1	6	—	—	—	—	—
2003	2	47	Matt Carle	United States	D	730	45	238	283	251	—	—	—	—	—
2003	5	139	Patrick Ehelechner	Germany	G	—	—	—	—	—	—	—	—	—	—
2003	7	201	Jonathan Tremblay	Canada	RW	—	—	—	—	—	—	—	—	—	—
2003	7	205	Joe Pavelski	United States	C	1332	476	592	1068	458	—	—	—	—	—
2003	7	216	Kai Hospelt	Germany	F	—	—	—	—	—	—	—	—	—	—
2003	8	236	Alexander Hult	Sweden	C	—	—	—	—	—	—	—	—	—	—
2003	9	267	Brian O'Hanley	United States	D	—	—	—	—	—	—	—	—	—	—
2003	9	276	Carter Lee	United States	F	—	—	—	—	—	—	—	—	—	—
2004	1	22	Lukas Kaspar	Czech Republic	LW	16	2	2	4	8	—	—	—	—	—
2004	3	94	Thomas Greiss	Germany	G	368	0	4	4	16	162	130	—	37	2.77
2004	4	126	Torrey Mitchell	Canada	C	666	67	85	152	351	—	—	—	—	—
2004	4	129	Jason Churchill	Canada	G	—	—	—	—	—	—	—	—	—	—
2004	5	153	Steven Zalewski	United States	C	10	0	0	0	0	—	—	—	—	—
2004	7	201	Michael Vernace	Canada	D	22	0	1	1	10	—	—	—	—	—
2004	7	225	Dave MacDonald	Canada	D	—	—	—	—	—	—	—	—	—	—
2004	8	234	Derek MacIntyre	United States	G	—	—	—	—	—	—	—	—	—	—
2004	9	288	Brian Mahoney-Wilson	United States	G	—	—	—	—	—	—	—	—	—	—
2004	9	289	Christian Jensen	United States	D	—	—	—	—	—	—	—	—	—	—
2005	1	8	Devin Setoguchi	Canada	RW	516	131	130	261	177	—	—	—	—	—
2005	2	35	Marc-Edouard Vlasic	Canada	D	1323	84	295	379	472	—	—	—	—	—
2005	4	112	Alex Stalock	United States	G	179	0	4	4	28	70	65	—	20	2.70
2005	5	140	Taylor Dakers	Canada	G	—	—	—	—	—	—	—	—	—	—
2005	5	149	Derek Joslin	Canada	D	116	4	12	16	63	—	—	—	—	—
2005	5	162	P. J. Fenton	United States	F	—	—	—	—	—	—	—	—	—	—
2005	6	183	Will Colbert	Canada	D	—	—	—	—	—	—	—	—	—	—
2005	6	193	Tony Lucia	United States	LW	—	—	—	—	—	—	—	—	—	—
2006	1	16	Ty Wishart	Canada	D	26	1	5	6	10	—	—	—	—	—
2006	2	36	Jamie McGinn	Canada	LW	617	117	103	220	267	—	—	—	—	—
2006	4	98	James DeLory	Canada	D	—	—	—	—	—	—	—	—	—	—
2006	5	143	Ashton Rome	Canada	RW	—	—	—	—	—	—	—	—	—	—
2006	7	202	John McCarthy	United States	LW	88	3	3	6	22	—	—	—	—	—
2006	7	203	Jay Barriball	United States	F	—	—	—	—	—	—	—	—	—	—
2007	1	9	Logan Couture	Canada	C	933	323	378	701	255	—	—	—	—	—
2007	1	28	Nick Petrecki	United States	D	1	0	0	0	0	—	—	—	—	—
2007	3	83	Timo Pielmeier	Germany	G	1	0	0	0	0	0	0	—	0	7.50
2007	3	91	Tyson Sexsmith	Canada	G	—	—	—	—	—	—	—	—	—	—
2007	6	165	Patrik Zackrisson	Sweden	W	—	—	—	—	—	—	—	—	—	—
2007	6	173	Nick Bonino	United States	C	868	159	199	358	251	—	—	—	—	—
2007	7	201	Justin Braun	United States	D	842	34	165	199	317	—	—	—	—	—
2007	7	203	Frazer McLaren	Canada	LW	102	4	7	11	264	—	—	—	—	—
2008	3	62	Justin Daniels	United States	C	—	—	—	—	—	—	—	—	—	—
2008	4	92	Samuel Groulx	Canada	D	—	—	—	—	—	—	—	—	—	—
2008	4	106	Harri Sateri	Finland	G	15	0	0	0	0	6	6	—	1	3.41
2008	5	146	Julien Demers	Canada	D	—	—	—	—	—	—	—	—	—	—
2008	6	177	Tommy Wingels	United States	C	448	62	81	143	254	—	—	—	—	—
2008	7	186	Jason Demers	Canada	D	700	45	169	214	407	—	—	—	—	—
2008	7	194	Drew Daniels	United States	RW	—	—	—	—	—	—	—	—	—	—
2009	2	43	William Wrenn	United States	D	—	—	—	—	—	—	—	—	—	—
2009	2	57	Taylor Doherty	Canada	D	—	—	—	—	—	—	—	—	—	—
2009	5	147	Phil Varone	Canada	C	97	8	9	17	26	—	—	—	—	—
2009	7	189	Marek Viedensky	Slovakia	C	—	—	—	—	—	—	—	—	—	—
2009	7	207	Dominik Bielke	Germany	D	—	—	—	—	—	—	—	—	—	—
2010	1	28	Charlie Coyle	United States	F	1032	209	334	543	369	—	—	—	—	—
2010	3	88	Max Gaede	United States	RW	—	—	—	—	—	—	—	—	—	—
2010	5	127	Cody Ferriero	United States	C	—	—	—	—	—	—	—	—	—	—
2010	5	129	Freddie Hamilton	Canada	C	75	4	2	6	12	—	—	—	—	—
2010	5	136	Isaac MacLeod	Canada	D	—	—	—	—	—	—	—	—	—	—
2010	6	136	Konrad Abeltshauser	Germany	D	—	—	—	—	—	—	—	—	—	—
2010	7	188	Lee Moffie	United States	D	—	—	—	—	—	—	—	—	—	—
2010	7	200	Chris Crane	United States	F	—	—	—	—	—	—	—	—	—	—
2011	2	47	Matt Nieto	United States	LW	705	87	119	206	129	—	—	—	—	—
2011	3	89	Justin Sefton	Canada	D	—	—	—	—	—	—	—	—	—	—
2011	5	133	Sean Kuraly	United States	C	644	70	105	175	384	—	—	—	—	—
2011	6	166	Daniil Sobchenko	Russia	C	—	—	—	—	—	—	—	—	—	—
2011	6	179	Dylan DeMelo	Canada	D	718	23	159	182	343	—	—	—	—	—
2011	7	194	Colin Blackwell	United States	C	368	45	61	106	113	—	—	—	—	—
2012	1	17	Tomas Hertl	Czech Republic	C	873	279	331	607	315	—	—	—	—	—
2012	2	55	Chris Tierney	Canada	C	649	80	168	248	135	—	—	—	—	—
2012	4	109	Christophe Lalancette	Canada	RW	—	—	—	—	—	—	—	—	—	—
2012	5	138	Danny O'Regan	United States	C	30	1	5	6	2	—	—	—	—	—
2012	6	168	Cliff Watson	United States	D	—	—	—	—	—	—	—	—	—	—
2012	7	198	Joakim Ryan	Sweden	D	145	4	20	24	33	—	—	—	—	—
2013	1	18	Mirco Mueller	Switzerland	D	185	5	23	28	61	—	—	—	—	—
2013	2	49	Gabryel Boudreau	Canada	LW	—	—	—	—	—	—	—	—	—	—
2013	4	117	Fredrik Bergvik	Sweden	G	—	—	—	—	—	—	—	—	—	—
2013	5	141	Michael Brodzinski	United States	D	—	—	—	—	—	—	—	—	—	—
2013	5	151	Gage Ausmus	United States	D	—	—	—	—	—	—	—	—	—	—
2013	7	201	Jake Jackson	United States	C	—	—	—	—	—	—	—	—	—	—
2013	7	207	Emil Galimov	Russia	LW	—	—	—	—	—	—	—	—	—	—
2014	1	27	Nikolay Goldobin	Russia	LW	125	19	27	46	24	—	—	—	—	—
2014	2	46	Julius Bergman	Sweden	D	—	—	—	—	—	—	—	—	—	—
2014	2	53	Noah Rod	Switzerland	RW	—	—	—	—	—	—	—	—	—	—
2014	3	72	Alex Schoenborn	United States	RW	—	—	—	—	—	—	—	—	—	—
2014	3	81	Dylan Sadowy	Canada	LW	—	—	—	—	—	—	—	—	—	—
2014	4	102	Alexis Vanier	Canada	D	—	—	—	—	—	—	—	—	—	—
2014	5	149	Rourke Chartier	Canada	C	56	3	1	4	16	—	—	—	—	—
2014	6	171	Kevin Labanc	United States	RW	512	84	153	237	229	—	—	—	—	—
2015	1	9	Timo Meier	Switzerland	RW	698	241	238	479	402	—	—	—	—	—
2015	2	31	Jeremy Roy	Canada	D	—	—	—	—	—	—	—	—	—	—
2015	3	86	Mike Robinson	United States	G	—	—	—	—	—	—	—	—	—	—
2015	4	106	Adam Helewka	Canada	LW	—	—	—	—	—	—	—	—	—	—
2015	4	130	Karlis Cukste	Latvia	D	—	—	—	—	—	—	—	—	—	—
2015	5	142	Rudolfs Balcers	Latvia	LW	170	28	34	62	50	—	—	—	—	—
2015	6	160	Adam Parsells	United States	D	—	—	—	—	—	—	—	—	—	—
2015	7	190	Marcus Vela	Canada	C	—	—	—	—	—	—	—	—	—	—
2015	7	193	Jake Kupsky	United States	G	—	—	—	—	—	—	—	—	—	—
2016	2	60	Dylan Gambrell	United States	C	233	17	23	40	79	—	—	—	—	—
2016	4	111	Noah Gregor	Canada	C	330	40	39	79	142	—	—	—	—	—
2016	5	150	Manuel Wiederer	Switzerland	C	—	—	—	—	—	—	—	—	—	—
2016	6	180	Mark Shoemaker	Canada	D	—	—	—	—	—	—	—	—	—	—
2016	7	210	Joachim Blichfeld	Denmark	LW	8	1	0	1	14	—	—	—	—	—
2017	1	19	Josh Norris	United States	C	283	104	88	192	129	—	—	—	—	—
2017	2	49	Mario Ferraro	Canada	D	490	24	90	114	216	—	—	—	—	—
2017	4	102	Scott Reedy	United States	C	35	7	2	9	10	—	—	—	—	—
2017	6	159	Jacob McGrew	United States	RW	—	—	—	—	—	—	—	—	—	—
2017	6	185	Sasha Chmelevski	United States	C	24	0	10	10	6	—	—	—	—	—
2017	7	212	Ivan Chekhovich	Russia	LW	4	0	1	1	0	—	—	—	—	—
2018	1	21	Ryan Merkley	Canada	D	39	1	5	6	8	—	—	—	—	—
2018	3	87	Linus Karlsson	Sweden	C	108	23	23	41	48	—	—	—	—	—
2018	4	102	Jasper Weatherby	United States	C	50	5	6	11	18	—	—	—	—	—
2018	6	176	Zachary Emond	Canada	G	—	—	—	—	—	—	—	—	—	—
2018	6	182	John Leonard	United States	LW	81	8	13	21	4	—	—	—	—	—
2019	2	48	Artemi Kniazev	Russia	D	1	0	0	0	0	—	—	—	—	—
2019	2	55	Dillon Hamaliuk	Canada	LW	—	—	—	—	—	—	—	—	—	—
2019	4	108	Yegor Spiridonov	Russia	C	—	—	—	—	—	—	—	—	—	—
2019	6	164	Timur Ibragimov	Russia	LW	—	—	—	—	—	—	—	—	—	—
2019	6	184	Santeri Hatakka	Finland	D	21	0	4	4	6	—	—	—	—	—
2020	1	31	Ozzy Wiesblatt	Canada	RW	5	0	1	1	0	—	—	—	—	—
2020	2	38	Thomas Bordeleau	United States	C	44	6	12	18	18	—	—	—	—	—
2020	3	56	Tristen Robins	Canada	RW	3	0	0	0	0	—	—	—	—	—
2020	4	87	Danil Gushchin	Russia	LW	18	2	3	5	6	—	—	—	—	—
2020	4	98	Brandon Coe	Canada	RW	—	—	—	—	—	—	—	—	—	—
2020	7	196	Alex Young	Canada	C	—	—	—	—	—	—	—	—	—	—
2020	7	201	Adam Raska	Czech Republic	RW	13	0	0	0	7	—	—	—	—	—
2020	7	206	Linus Oberg	Sweden	C	—	—	—	—	—	—	—	—	—	—
2020	7	210	Timofey Spitserov	Russia	RW	—	—	—	—	—	—	—	—	—	—
2021	1	7	William Eklund	Sweden	LW	252	50	113	163	99	—	—	—	—	—
2021	3	81	Benjamin Gaudreau	Canada	G	—	—	—	—	—	—	—	—	—	—
2021	4	103	Gannon Laroque	Canada	D	—	—	—	—	—	—	—	—	—	—
2021	4	121	Ethan Cardwell	Canada	RW	13	2	0	2	4	—	—	—	—	—
2021	5	135	Artem Guryev	Russia	D	—	—	—	—	—	—	—	—	—	—
2021	5	156	Max Mccue	Canada	C	—	—	—	—	—	—	—	—	—	—
2021	6	167	Liam Gilmartin	United States	LW	—	—	—	—	—	—	—	—	—	—
2021	6	177	Theo Jacobsson	Sweden	C	—	—	—	—	—	—	—	—	—	—
2021	7	199	Evgenii Kashnikov	Russia	D	—	—	—	—	—	—	—	—	—	—
2022	1	27	Filip Bystedt	Sweden	C	—	—	—	—	—	—	—	—	—	—
2022	2	34	Cameron Lund	United States	C	11	2	1	3	4	—	—	—	—	—
2022	2	45	Mattias Havelid	Sweden	D	—	—	—	—	—	—	—	—	—	—
2022	3	76	Michael Fisher	United States	D	—	—	—	—	—	—	—	—	—	—
2022	4	108	Mason Beaupit	Canada	G	—	—	—	—	—	—	—	—	—	—
2022	5	140	Jake Furlong	Canada	D	—	—	—	—	—	—	—	—	—	—
2022	6	172	Joey Muldowney	United States	RW	—	—	—	—	—	—	—	—	—	—
2022	7	195	Eli Barnett	Canada	D	—	—	—	—	—	—	—	—	—	—
2022	7	217	Reese Laubach	United States	C	—	—	—	—	—	—	—	—	—	—
2023	1	4	Will Smith	United States	C	143	42	62	104	34	—	—	—	—	—
2023	1	26	Quentin Musty	United States	LW	—	—	—	—	—	—	—	—	—	—
2023	2	36	Kasper Halttunen	Finland	RW	—	—	—	—	—	—	—	—	—	—
2023	3	71	Brandon Svoboda	United States	C	—	—	—	—	—	—	—	—	—	—
2023	4	123	Luca Cagnoni	Canada	D	9	0	2	2	10	—	—	—	—	—
2023	5	130	Axel Landen	Sweden	D	—	—	—	—	—	—	—	—	—	—
2023	5	132	Eric Pohlkamp	United States	D	—	—	—	—	—	—	—	—	—	—
2023	7	196	David Klee	United States	F	—	—	—	—	—	—	—	—	—	—
2023	7	203	Yegor Rimashevsky	Russia	F	—	—	—	—	—	—	—	—	—	—
2024	1	1	Macklin Celebrini	Canada	C	152	70	108	178	72	—	—	—	—	—
2024	1	11	Sam Dickinson	Canada	D	72	1	13	14	22	—	—	—	—	—
2024	2	33	Igor Chernyshov	Russia	LW	28	9	10	19	6	—	—	—	—	—
2024	2	53	Leo Sahlin Wallenius	Sweden	D	—	—	—	—	—	—	—	—	—	—
2024	3	82	Carson Wetsch	Canada	RW	—	—	—	—	—	—	—	—	—	—
2024	4	116	Christian Kirsch	Switzerland	G	—	—	—	—	—	—	—	—	—	—
2024	5	131	Colton Roberts	Canada	D	—	—	—	—	—	—	—	—	—	—
2024	5	143	Nate Misskey	Canada	D	—	—	—	—	—	—	—	—	—	—
2024	7	194	Yaroslav Korostelyov	Russia	G	—	—	—	—	—	—	—	—	—	—
2025	1	2	Michael Misa	Canada	C	45	9	12	21	10	—	—	—	—	—
2025	1	30	Joshua Ravensbergen	Canada	G	—	—	—	—	—	—	—	—	—	—
2025	2	33	Haoxi Wang	China	D	—	—	—	—	—	—	—	—	—	—
2025	2	53	Cole McKinney	United States	C	—	—	—	—	—	—	—	—	—	—
2025	3	95	Teddy Mutryn	United States	C	—	—	—	—	—	—	—	—	—	—
2025	4	115	Ilyas Magomedsultanov	Russia	D	—	—	—	—	—	—	—	—	—	—
2025	4	124	Zachary Sharp	United States	D	—	—	—	—	—	—	—	—	—	—
2025	5	150	Max Heise	Canada	C	—	—	—	—	—	—	—	—	—	—
2025	7	210	Richard Gallant	United States	C	—	—	—	—	—	—	—	—	—	—
2026	1	2	Ivar Stenberg	Sweden	LW	—	—	—	—	—	—	—	—	—	—
2026	1	9	Keaton Verhoeff	Canada	D	—	—	—	—	—	—	—	—	—	—
2026	1	21	Ryan Lin	Canada	D	—	—	—	—	—	—	—	—	—	—
2026	4	127	Brady Knowling	Canada	G	—	—	—	—	—	—	—	—	—	—
2026	6	174	Jake Gustafson	United States	C	—	—	—	—	—	—	—	—	—	—
2026	7	201	Alexander Karmanov	Moldova	D	—	—	—	—	—	—	—	—	—	—

== See also ==
- 1991 NHL Dispersal and Expansion Drafts
