= Tomi Hirvonen =

Finnish ice hockey player (born 1977)

- Born: January 11, 1977 (age 49) Tampere, Finland
- Height: 5 ft 10 in (178 cm)
- Weight: 187 lb (85 kg; 13 st 5 lb)
- Position: Center
- Shot: Left
- Played for: Ilves; JYP Jyväskylä; Lahti Pelicans; Skellefteå AIK
- NHL draft: 207th overall, 1995; Colorado Avalanche
- Playing career: 1995–2006

Tomi Hirvonen (born January 11, 1977) is a Finnish former professional ice hockey forward who spent most of his career playing in the Finnish Liiga.

He was drafted by the Colorado Avalanche 207th overall in the 1995 NHL entry draft however never signed a contract to play in North America. He played with Ilves for majority of his professional career, concluding an 11-year career at the end of the 2005–06 season.

== Career statistics ==
=== Regular season and playoffs ===
			Regular season					Playoffs
Season	Team	League	GP	G	A	Pts	PIM	GP	G	A	Pts	PIM
1993–94	Ilves	FIN U18	28	13	14	27	96	—	—	—	—	—
1993–94	Ilves	FIN U20	1	0	0	0	0	—	—	—	—	—
1994–95	Ilves	FIN U18	6	1	5	6	14	—	—	—	—	—
1994–95	Ilves	FIN U20	28	9	13	22	30	8	4	2	6	14
1995–96	Ilves	FIN U20	5	2	2	4	37	—	—	—	—	—
1995–96	Ilves	SM-l	28	1	0	1	24	—	—	—	—	—
1995–96	KOOVEE	FIN.2	7	4	1	5	26	—	—	—	—	—
1996–97	Ilves	FIN U20	3	2	3	5	2	—	—	—	—	—
1996–97	Ilves	SM-l	40	0	7	7	22	6	0	0	0	4
1997–98	Ilves	SM-l	48	10	12	22	54	9	0	0	0	2
1998–99	Ilves	SM-l	50	5	15	20	94	4	0	0	0	8
1999–2000	Ilves	SM-l	45	4	7	11	62	3	0	1	1	6
2000–01	JYP	SM-l	52	5	8	13	76	—	—	—	—	—
2001–02	JYP	SM-l	55	9	10	19	53	—	—	—	—	—
2002–03	Pelicans	SM-l	52	7	9	16	81	—	—	—	—	—
2003–04	Skellefteå AIK	Allsv	46	21	21	42	36	10	0	1	1	4
2004–05	Skellefteå AIK	Allsv	29	8	18	26	50	10	4	5	9	16
2005–06	Ilves	SM-l	26	2	3	5	2	—	—	—	—	—
Liiga totals			396	43	71	114	478	22	0	1	1	20

=== International ===
Year	Team	Event	Result	GP	G	A	Pts	PIM
1995	Finland	EJC18	1st place, gold medalist(s)	5	1	3	4	6
1996	Finland	WJC	6th	6	1	2	3	27
1997	Finland	WJC	5th	6	1	1	2	4
Junior totals				17	3	6	9	37
