= T-Blades =

Type of hockey skate blade

T-Blades are a type of hockey skate blade manufactured by the German company T-Blade GmbH. Unlike tradition skate blades, T-blades are replaced when worn out. The manufacturer of the T-Blade states that "Compared to conventional skate blades, the T-Blade runner lasts 4-5 times longer." The T-Blade is held to the skate chassis by a stabilizer and six screws which require a special three-pronged wrench. The blades are sold pre-sharpened.

Former NHL players who used of T-Blades at some point include Jochen Hecht of the Buffalo Sabres, Dennis Seidenberg of the New York Islanders, Marcel Goc of the Nashville Predators, and Christian Ehrhoff of the Buffalo Sabres.
