= Riihijärvi =

Riihijärvi is a Finnish surname. Notable people with the surname include:

- Juha Riihijärvi (born 1969), Finnish ice hockey player
- Teemu Riihijärvi (born 1977), Finnish ice hockey player
