= Markkanen =

Markkanen is a Finnish surname. Notable people with the surname include:

- Gregory Markkanen, American politician
- Jussi Markkanen (born 1975), Finnish ice hockey goaltender
- Matti Markkanen (1887–1942), Finnish gymnast
- Mikko Markkanen (born 1977), Finnish hockey player
- Väinö Markkanen (1929–2022), Finnish sports shooter
- A family of Finnish sportspeople:
  - Pekka Markkanen (born 1967), basketball player
  - Eero Markkanen (born 1991), older son, footballer
  - Lauri Markkanen (born 1997), younger son, basketball player
