= Alexei Vasiliev (ice hockey, born 1977) =

Russian ice hockey player

- Born: September 1, 1977 (age 47); Yaroslavl, Russian SFSR, Soviet Union
- Height: 6 ft 1 in (185 cm)
- Weight: 192 lb (87 kg; 13 st 10 lb)
- Position: Defence
- Shot: Left
- Played for: Lokomotiv Yaroslavl; New York Rangers; Torpedo Nizhny Novgorod
- NHL draft: 110th overall, 1995; New York Rangers
- Playing career: 1993–2015

Alexei Sergeyevich Vasiliev (Russian: Васильев, Алексей Сергеевич; born September 1, 1977) is a Russian former ice hockey defenseman. He played in one National Hockey League game for the New York Rangers during the 1999–00 NHL season, going scoreless and receiving two penalty minutes in a contest against the Montreal Canadiens.

Vasiliev also spent 12 seasons playing for Lokomotiv Yaroslavl in the Russian Superleague and KHL. His contract was not renewed for the 2011–12 KHL season, which saved his life as he was not in the 2011 Lokomotiv Yaroslavl plane crash that killed the majority of the team.

== Career statistics ==
=== Regular season and playoffs ===
			Regular season					Playoffs
Season	Team	League	GP	G	A	Pts	PIM	GP	G	A	Pts	PIM
1992–93	Yarinterkom Yaroslavl	RUS-2	6	0	0	0	8	—	—	—	—	—
1993–94	Torpedo Yaroslavl	RUS	2	0	1	1	4	—	—	—	—	—
1993–94	Torpedo–2 Yaroslavl	RUS-3	42	6	3	9	24	—	—	—	—	—
1994–95	Torpedo Yaroslavl	RUS	1	0	0	0	0	—	—	—	—	—
1994–95	Torpedo–2 Yaroslavl	RUS-2	47	3	2	5	10	—	—	—	—	—
1995–96	Torpedo Yaroslavl	RUS	40	4	7	11	4	—	—	—	—	—
1995–96	Torpedo–2 Yaroslavl	RUS-2	6	0	0	0	0	—	—	—	—	—
1996–97	Torpedo Yaroslavl	RSL	44	2	8	10	10	9	1	1	2	8
1998–99	Hartford Wolf Pack	AHL	75	8	19	27	24	6	0	1	1	2
1999–00	New York Rangers	NHL	1	0	0	0	2	—	—	—	—	—
1999–00	Hartford Wolf Pack	AHL	75	10	28	38	20	15	3	1	4	2
2000–01	Milwaukee Admirals	IHL	69	6	12	18	20	4	0	0	0	2
2001–02	Lokomotiv Yaroslavl	RSL	51	5	11	16	40	9	1	1	2	2
2002–03	Lokomotiv Yaroslavl	RSL	51	2	9	11	16	10	2	0	2	0
2003–04	Lokomotiv Yaroslavl	RSL	60	5	8	13	20	3	0	0	0	4
2004–05	Lokomotiv Yaroslavl	RSL	60	5	12	17	16	9	2	2	4	2
2005–06	Lokomotiv Yaroslavl	RSL	51	6	8	14	22	11	1	1	2	0
2006–07	Lokomotiv Yaroslavl	RSL	54	4	10	14	32	7	0	2	2	2
2007–08	Lokomotiv Yaroslavl	RSL	57	4	10	14	28	16	0	0	0	12
2008–09	Lokomotiv Yaroslavl	KHL	55	5	18	23	24	19	1	4	5	16
2009–10	Lokomotiv Yaroslavl	KHL	56	5	13	18	12	17	0	6	6	4
2010–11	Lokomotiv Yaroslavl	KHL	53	1	7	8	16	15	1	0	1	4
2011–12	Torpedo Nizhny Novgorod	KHL	31	2	6	8	10	12	0	4	4	4
2012–13	Torpedo Nizhny Novgorod	KHL	48	6	8	14	22	—	—	—	—	—
2013–14	Lokomotiv Yaroslavl	KHL	46	5	3	8	8	18	0	2	2	2
2014–15	Lokomotiv Yaroslavl	KHL	56	3	3	6	30	6	0	0	0	0
RUS/RSL totals			471	37	84	121	192	74	7	7	14	30
KHL totals			345	27	58	85	122	87	6	12	18	30
NHL totals			1	0	0	0	2	—	—	—	—	—

=== International ===
Year	Team	Event	GP	G	A	Pts	PIM
1995	Russia	EJC	5	0	1	1	2
1996	Russia	WJC	7	2	0	2	2
1997	Russia	WJC	6	0	0	0	2
Junior totals			18	2	1	3	6

== See also ==
- List of players who played only one game in the NHL
