= Alexei Kolkunov =

Russian ice hockey player

- Born: 3 February 1977 (age 49) Belgorod, Russian SFSR, Soviet Union
- Height: 6 ft 2 in (188 cm)
- Weight: 215 lb (98 kg; 15 st 5 lb)
- Position: Centre
- Shot: Left
- Played for: Krylya Sovetov Moscow; Syracuse Crunch; Wilkes-Barre/Scranton Penguins; Wheeling Nailers; Ak-Bars Kazan; Spartak Moscow; CSKA Moscow; Torpedo Nizhny Novgorod; Vityaz Chekhov; Khimik Voskresensk
- NHL draft: 154th overall, 1995; Pittsburgh Penguins
- Playing career: 1998–2011

Alexei Kolkunov (born 3 February 1977) is a Russian former professional ice hockey forward.

== Career ==
Kolkunov played one season with Krylja Sovetov of the Russian Superleague before being selected by the Pittsburgh Penguins 154th overall in the 1995 NHL entry draft. He would remain in Russia until the completion of the 1997-98 RSL season. On 13 July 1998, the Penguins signed Kolkunov to a three-year contract. Several months later, he attended camp with the Penguins but was later assigned to the Syracuse Crunch, who were the Penguins' AHL affiliate at the time. Kolkunov would remain in North America until the start of the 2000-01 ECHL season, where he chose to go home after eight games instead of continuing to play with the Wheeling Nailers. Kolkunov would finish the season with Ak Bars Kazan of the RSL.

Kolkunov has remained in Russia, playing in the KHL, the second-tier VHL, and the third-tier RHL from 2000 until 2010 before signing a one-year contract with Yertis Pavlodar of the Kazakhstan Vyschaya Liga.

== Career statistics ==
=== Regular season and playoffs ===
			Regular season					Playoffs
Season	Team	League	GP	G	A	Pts	PIM	GP	G	A	Pts	PIM
1993–94	Krylya Sovetov–2 Moscow	RUS.3	38	3	4	7	18	—	—	—	—	—
1994–95	Krylya Sovetov Moscow	IHL	7	0	0	0	0	4	1	0	1	0
1994–95	Krylya Sovetov–2 Moscow	RUS.2	39	10	9	19	42	—	—	—	—	—
1995–96	Krylya Sovetov Moscow	IHL	43	9	3	12	35	—	—	—	—	—
1995–96	Krylya Sovetov–2 Moscow	RUS.2	2	0	3	3	0	—	—	—	—	—
1996–97	Krylya Sovetov Moscow	RSL	44	9	16	25	36	2	0	0	0	4
1997–98	Krylya Sovetov Moscow	RSL	20	6	4	10	22	—	—	—	—	—
1997–98	Ak Bars Kazan	RSL	—	—	—	—	—	7	1	3	4	2
1998–99	Syracuse Crunch	AHL	55	5	13	18	20	—	—	—	—	—
1999–2000	Wilkes–Barre/Scranton Penguins	AHL	75	12	25	37	33	—	—	—	—	—
2000–01	Wheeling Nailers	ECHL	8	1	2	3	4	—	—	—	—	—
2000–01	Ak Bars Kazan	RSL	7	0	0	0	6	—	—	—	—	—
2000–01	Ak Bars–2 Kazan	RUS.3	2	3	1	4	0	—	—	—	—	—
2001–02	Spartak Moscow	RSL	28	2	1	3	12	—	—	—	—	—
2001–02	Spartak–2 Moscow	RUS.3	5	0	8	8	2	—	—	—	—	—
2001–02	CSKA Moscow	RSL	12	1	2	3	8	—	—	—	—	—
2002–03	CSKA Moscow	RSL	49	10	6	16	20	—	—	—	—	—
2003–04	CSKA Moscow	RSL	53	4	3	7	16	—	—	—	—	—
2003–04	CSKA–2 Moscow	RUS.3	2	0	0	0	0	—	—	—	—	—
2004–05	Torpedo Nizhny Novgorod	RUS.2	34	0	8	8	45	15	4	3	7	4
2005–06	Vityaz Chekhov	RSL	47	3	2	5	38	—	—	—	—	—
2006–07	Vityaz Chekhov	RSL	34	1	2	3	30	1	0	0	0	0
2006–07	Vityaz–2 Chekhov	RUS.3	11	0	3	3	6	—	—	—	—	—
2007–08	Khimik Voskresensk	RUS.2	24	3	9	12	24	14	4	1	5	4
2008–09	Khimik Voskresensk	KHL	32	1	5	6	26	—	—	—	—	—
2009–10	Titan Klin	RUS.2	34	6	6	12	32	13	2	1	3	24
2010–11	Ertis Pavlodar	KAZ	39	6	16	22	12	14	2	6	8	4
IHL & RSL totals			344	45	39	84	223	14	2	3	5	6
RUS.2 totals			133	19	35	54	143	42	10	5	15	32
AHL totals			130	17	38	55	53	—	—	—	—	—

=== International ===
Year	Team	Event	GP	G	A	Pts	PIM
1995	Russia	EJC	5	1	1	2	4
1996	Russia	WJC	6	0	0	0	2
1997	Russia	WJC	6	4	4	8	6
Junior totals			17	5	5	10	12
