= Teemu Riihijärvi =

Finnish ice hockey player (born 1977)

- Born: March 1, 1977 (age 49) Espoo, Finland
- Height: 6 ft 6 in (198 cm)
- Weight: 214 lb (97 kg; 15 st 4 lb)
- Position: Forward
- Played for: Espoo Blues; Pelicans; SaiPa; Lukko; Södertälje SK
- NHL draft: 12th overall, 1995; San Jose Sharks
- Playing career: 1993–2006

Teemu Riihijärvi (born March 1, 1977) is a Finnish former professional ice hockey forward. He was drafted in the first round, twelfth overall, of the 1995 NHL entry draft by the San Jose Sharks. He never appeared in an NHL game.

== Career statistics ==
=== Regular season and playoffs ===
			Regular season					Playoffs
Season	Team	League	GP	G	A	Pts	PIM	GP	G	A	Pts	PIM
1993–94	Kiekko-Espoo	FIN U18	10	5	6	11	8	—	—	—	—	—
1993–94	Kiekko-Espoo	FIN U20	29	8	5	13	22	—	—	—	—	—
1993–94	Kiekko-Espoo	SM-l	13	1	1	2	6	—	—	—	—	—
1994–95	Kiekko-Espoo	FIN U18	4	2	3	5	12	—	—	—	—	—
1994–95	Kiekko-Espoo	FIN U20	30	10	4	14	50	—	—	—	—	—
1994–95	Kiekko-Espoo	SM-l	13	1	0	1	4	—	—	—	—	—
1995–96	Kiekko-Espoo	FIN U20	19	2	4	6	46	—	—	—	—	—
1995–96	Kiekko-Espoo	SM-l	2	0	0	0	0	—	—	—	—	—
1995–96	Haukat	FIN.2	4	0	0	0	2	—	—	—	—	—
1996–97	Kiekko-Espoo	FIN U20	5	2	4	6	6	—	—	—	—	—
1996–97	Kiekko-Espoo	SM-l	47	3	1	4	8	4	0	0	0	2
1997–98	Kiekko-Espoo	SM-l	12	0	1	1	6	—	—	—	—	—
1997–98	Lukko	FIN U20	2	0	0	0	2	—	—	—	—	—
1997–98	Lukko	SM-l	37	5	3	8	61	—	—	—	—	—
1998–99	Blues	SM-l	52	2	4	6	75	4	0	0	0	0
1999–2000	Pelicans	SM-l	26	6	2	8	38	—	—	—	—	—
2000–01	Pelicans	SM-l	51	4	14	18	56	3	0	0	0	0
2001–02	Pelicans	SM-l	37	2	3	5	24	3	0	0	0	2
2002–03	SaiPa	SM-l	50	8	10	18	65	—	—	—	—	—
2003–04	Södertälje SK	SEL	34	5	6	11	48	—	—	—	—	—
2004–05	Södertälje SK	SEL	50	5	4	9	96	10	0	0	0	4
2005–06	Blues	SM-l	5	0	1	1	0	—	—	—	—	—
SM-l totals			346	32	40	72	343	14	0	0	0	4

=== International ===
Year	Team	Event	GP	G	A	Pts	PIM
1994	Finland	EJC	5	1	0	1	4
1995	Finland	EJC	4	0	2	2	10
1996	Finland	WJC	6	2	1	3	8
1997	Finland	WJC	6	0	0	0	2
Junior totals			21	3	3	6	24

Preceded by Jeff Friesen	San Jose Sharks first-round draft pick 1995	Succeeded by Andrei Zyuzin
