= Richard Rochefort =

Canadian ice hockey player

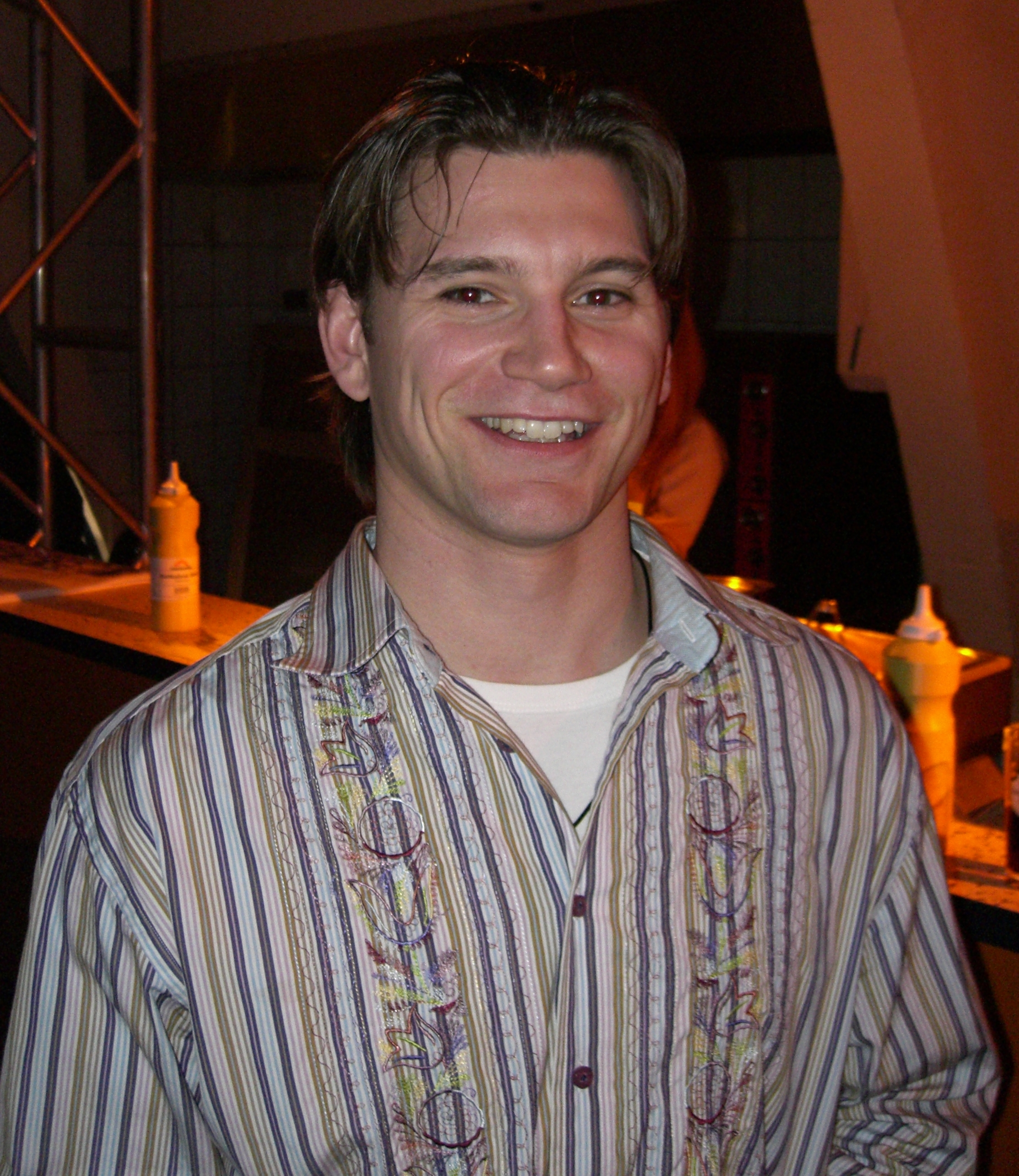
- Born: January 7, 1977 (age 49) North Bay, Ontario, Canada
- Height: 5 ft 10 in (178 cm)
- Weight: 190 lb (86 kg; 13 st 8 lb)
- Position: Centre/Defence
- Shot: Right
- ALH team Former teams: Nikkō Ice Bucks; Albany River Rats (AHL)
- NHL draft: 174th overall, 1995; New Jersey Devils
- Playing career: 1997–2011

Richard Rochefort (born January 7, 1977) is a Canadian former professional ice hockey player who played for Nikkō Ice Bucks of the Asia League Ice Hockey (ALIH). He was selected by the New Jersey Devils in the 7th round (174th overall) of the 1995 NHL entry draft.

Rochefort was a nominee for the 2001–02 Fred T. Hunt Memorial Award for the American Hockey League player demonstrating dedication, determination, and sportsmanship.

== Career statistics ==
			Regular season					Playoffs
Season	Team	League	GP	G	A	Pts	PIM	GP	G	A	Pts	PIM
1993–94	Waterloo Siskins	MWJHL	45	21	32	53	41	—	—	—	—	—
1994–95	Sudbury Wolves	OHL	57	21	44	65	26	13	3	7	10	6
1995–96	Sudbury Wolves	OHL	56	25	40	65	38	—	—	—	—	—
1996–97	Sudbury Wolves	OHL	28	18	24	42	40	—	—	—	—	—
1996–97	Sarnia Sting	OHL	18	5	23	28	23	12	3	9	12	8
1997–98	Albany River Rats	AHL	59	7	14	21	16	13	1	0	1	4
1998–99	Albany River Rats	AHL	70	16	10	26	26	5	1	0	1	0
1999–2000	Albany River Rats	AHL	55	12	12	24	22	5	0	0	0	0
2000–01	Albany River Rats	AHL	75	16	24	40	18	—	—	—	—	—
2001–02	Albany River Rats	AHL	59	15	13	28	12	—	—	—	—	—
2002–03	Ässät	SM-l	33	5	6	11	36	—	—	—	—	—
2002–03	HC Ambrì–Piotta	NLA	4	1	3	4	2	4	0	2	2	2
2003–04	Herning Blue Fox	DEN	31	13	11	24	32	—	—	—	—	—
2004–05	HC Fassa	ITA	30	14	28	42	42	4	1	2	3	2
2005–06	Lausitzer Füchse	GER.2	39	8	19	27	61	—	—	—	—	—
2005–06	Ritten Sport	ITA	9	5	4	9	22	8	3	1	4	14
2006–07	Iserlohn Roosters	DEL	50	8	17	25	56	—	—	—	—	—
2007–08	Seibu Prince Rabbits	ALH	21	3	10	13	61	4	0	2	2	4
2008–09	Seibu Prince Rabbits	ALH	34	7	17	24	46	10	1	3	4	32
2009–10	Augsburger Panther	DEL	5	0	2	2	0	5	0	0	0	9
2010–11	Nikkō Ice Bucks	ALH	34	8	17	25	40	—	—	—	—	—
AHL totals			318	66	73	139	94	23	2	0	2	4
