= Marty Wilford =

Canadian ice hockey player

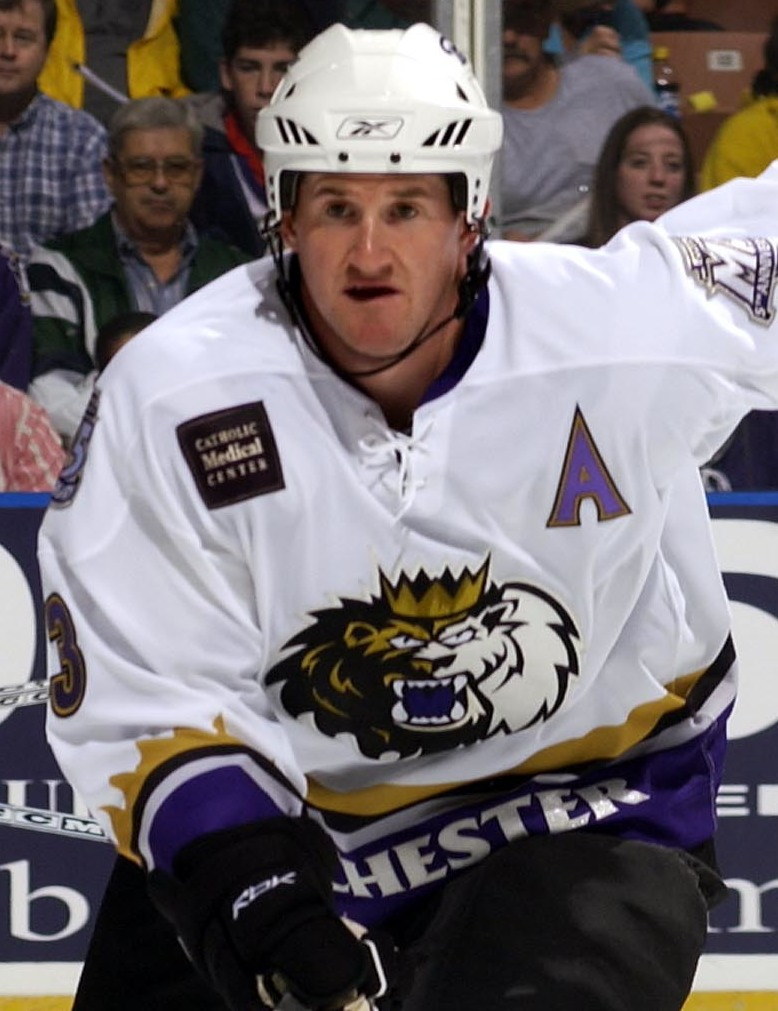
- Wilford with the Manchester Monarchs during the 2005-06 season
- Born: April 17, 1977 (age 49) St. Thomas. Ontario, Canada
- Height: 6 ft 1 in (185 cm)
- Weight: 195 lb (88 kg; 13 st 13 lb)
- Position: Defence
- Shot: Left
- Played for: AHL; Norfolk Admirals; St. John's Maple Leafs; Milwaukee Admirals; Hartford Wolf Pack; Manchester Monarchs; Iowa Stars; IHL; Indianapolis Ice; Cleveland Lumberjacks; Houston Aeros; ECHL; Columbus Chill; Europe; Hamburg Freezers; Iserlohn Roosters; HC Fassa
- NHL draft: 149th overall, 1995; Chicago Blackhawks
- Playing career: 1997–2011

Marty Wilford (born April 17, 1977) is a Canadian former professional ice hockey defenceman. He was selected by the Chicago Blackhawks in the 6th round (149th overall) of the 1995 NHL entry draft.

In August 2011 Wilford began his coaching career as an assistant coach with the Syracuse Crunch of the American Hockey League. Since 2021 he has served as an Assistant Coach for the Buffalo Sabres. He is married to Michelle Wilford.

== Career statistics ==
			Regular season					Playoffs
Season	Team	League	GP	G	A	Pts	PIM	GP	G	A	Pts	PIM
1993–94	Peterborough Petes	OPJHL	40	3	19	22	107	—	—	—	—	—
1994–95	Oshawa Generals	OHL	63	1	6	7	95	7	1	1	2	4
1995–96	Oshawa Generals	OHL	65	3	24	27	107	5	0	1	1	4
1996–97	Oshawa Generals	OHL	62	19	43	62	126	16	2	18	20	28
1997–98	Columbus Chill	ECHL	46	8	27	35	123	—	—	—	—	—
1997–98	Indianapolis Ice	IHL	26	0	4	4	16	—	—	—	—	—
1998–99	Indianapolis Ice	IHL	80	3	13	16	116	7	0	1	1	16
1999–2000	Cleveland Lumberjacks	IHL	7	0	3	3	24	—	—	—	—	—
1999–2000	Houston Aeros	IHL	45	0	9	9	30	11	2	2	4	18
2000–01	Norfolk Admirals	AHL	80	7	41	48	102	9	1	5	6	8
2001–02	St. John's Maple Leafs	AHL	60	4	21	25	70	—	—	—	—	—
2001–02	Milwaukee Admirals	AHL	8	1	3	4	12	—	—	—	—	—
2001–02	Hartford Wolf Pack	AHL	9	0	2	2	2	10	3	3	6	4
2002–03	Norfolk Admirals	AHL	80	13	35	48	87	9	0	3	3	16
2003–04	Norfolk Admirals	AHL	80	5	35	40	67	8	0	3	3	18
2004–05	Norfolk Admirals	AHL	78	7	30	37	80	6	0	4	4	15
2005–06	Manchester Monarchs	AHL	79	5	36	41	81	7	0	3	3	19
2006–07	Iowa Stars	AHL	65	5	25	30	72	12	0	2	2	18
2007–08	Hamburg Freezers	DEL	46	8	34	42	70	8	0	3	3	20
2008–09	Iserlohn Roosters	DEL	52	5	26	31	72	—	—	—	—	—
2009–10	Iserlohn Roosters	DEL	55	3	38	41	126	—	—	—	—	—
2010–11	HC Fassa	Italy	39	3	23	26	54	4	1	1	2	33
AHL totals			539	47	228	275	573	61	4	23	27	98
IHL totals			158	3	29	32	186	18	2	3	5	34
DEL totals			153	16	98	114	268	8	0	3	3	20
