= Jan Snopek =

Czech ice hockey player

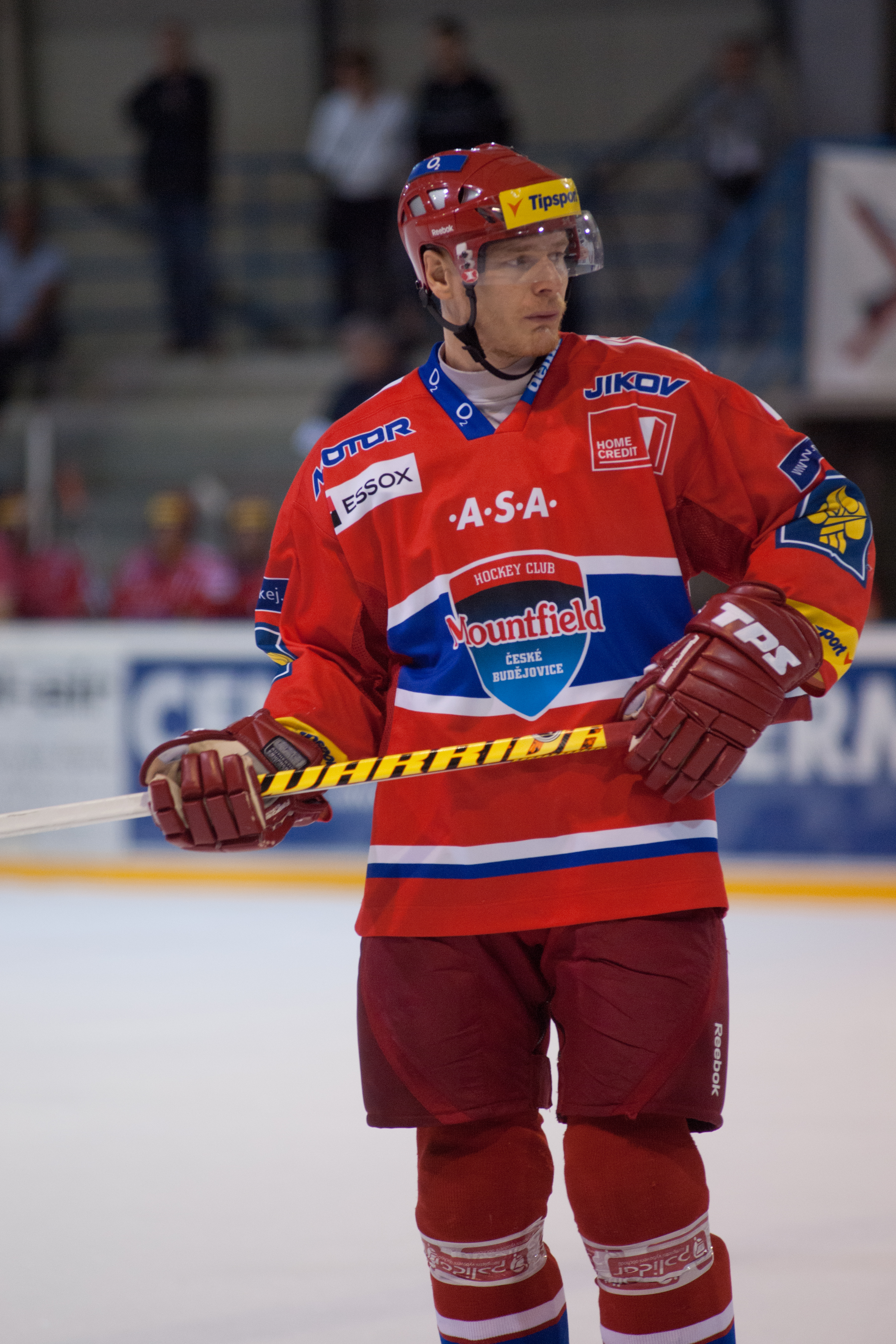
- Born: June 21, 1976 (age 49) Prague, Czechoslovakia
- Height: 6 ft 4 in (193 cm)
- Weight: 223 lb (101 kg; 15 st 13 lb)
- Position: Defence
- Shot: Right
- Czech Extraliga team: HC České Budějovice
- NHL draft: 109th overall, 1995; Edmonton Oilers
- Playing career: 1997–2014

Jan Snopek (born June 21, 1976) is a Czech former professional ice hockey defenceman. He was selected by the Edmonton Oilers in the 5th round (109th overall) of the 1995 NHL entry draft.

Snopek played with HC České Budějovice in the Czech Extraliga during the 2010–11 Czech Extraliga season.

== Career statistics ==
			Regular season					Playoffs
Season	Team	League	GP	G	A	Pts	PIM	GP	G	A	Pts	PIM
1993–94	Oshawa Generals	OHL	52	0	5	5	51	—	—	—	—	—
1994–95	Oshawa Generals	OHL	63	14	30	44	97	7	0	1	1	4
1995–96	Oshawa Generals	OHL	64	7	28	35	79	5	0	0	0	2
1996–97	Oshawa Generals	OHL	57	10	32	42	103	15	2	7	9	24
1996–97	HC Becherovka Karlovy Vary	CZE.2
1997–98	Västerås IK	SEL	34	2	7	9	42	—	—	—	—	—
1997–98	Saint John Flames	AHL	2	0	0	0	0	—	—	—	—	—
1998–99	HC Becherovka Karlovy Vary	ELH	46	0	4	4	83	—	—	—	—	—
1999–2000	HC Becherovka Karlovy Vary	ELH	49	3	9	12	46	—	—	—	—	—
2000–01	HC Slavia Praha	ELH	51	5	6	11	82	11	0	2	2	6
2001–02	HC Slavia Praha	ELH	36	0	5	5	66	9	0	0	0	8
2002–03	HC JME Znojemští Orli	ELH	52	7	10	17	92	6	2	0	2	30
2003–04	HC JME Znojemští Orli	ELH	51	5	7	12	136	7	1	0	1	6
2004–05	HC Moeller Pardubice	ELH	50	5	21	26	60	16	2	1	3	36
2005–06	HC Moeller Pardubice	ELH	52	3	9	12	104	—	—	—	—	—
2006–07	HC Moeller Pardubice	ELH	48	2	6	8	132	18	1	2	3	34
2007–08	HC Moeller Pardubice	ELH	52	4	9	13	94	—	—	—	—	—
2008–09	HC Moeller Pardubice	ELH	52	2	7	9	92	7	0	0	0	43
2009–10	HC VCES Hradec Králové	ELH	52	4	8	12	112	5	0	1	1	6
2010–11	HC VCES Hradec Králové	ELH	42	2	12	14	46	—	—	—	—	—
2010–11	Kärpät	SM-l	18	2	2	4	26	3	1	0	1	4
2011–12	Kärpät	SM-l	57	1	9	10	52	4	0	0	0	4
2012–13	Beibarys Atyrau	KAZ	15	0	4	4	28	—	—	—	—	—
2012–13	Stjernen Hockey	NOR	16	0	1	1	46	—	—	—	—	—
2012–13	Hockey Milano Rossoblu	ITA	3	0	0	0	2	6	1	0	1	4
2013–14	WSV Sterzing Broncos	ITA	4	0	1	1	6	—	—	—	—	—
ELH totals			633	42	113	155	1145	79	6	6	12	169
