= Mikko Markkanen =

Finnish ice hockey player

- Born: January 9, 1977 (age 49) Turku, Finland
- Height: 5 ft 10 in (178 cm)
- Weight: 176 lb (80 kg; 12 st 8 lb)
- Position: Right Wing
- Shot: Right
- Played for: TuTo (Mestis)
- NHL draft: 220th overall, 1995; San Jose Sharks
- Playing career: 1994–2003

Mikko Markkanen (born 9 January 1977) is a Finnish ice hockey player who spent all of his playing years in the I-Divisioona and Mestis second-level league in Finland. He was drafted into the National Hockey League by the San Jose Sharks in the ninth round in the 1995 NHL entry draft. He is not related to Finnish goaltender Jussi Markkanen

== Career statistics ==
=== Regular season and playoffs ===
			Regular season					Playoffs
Season	Team	League	GP	G	A	Pts	PIM	GP	G	A	Pts	PIM
1993–94	TPS	FIN U18	10	5	4	9	18	1	0	2	2	0
1993–94	TPS	FIN U20	33	8	4	12	16	5	1	0	1	2
1994–95	TPS	FIN U18	11	7	5	12	12	4	1	3	4	2
1994–95	TPS	FIN U20	32	10	8	18	28	—	—	—	—	—
1995–96	TPS	FIN U20	7	2	3	5	16	—	—	—	—	—
1995–96	Kiekko–67	FIN.2	38	9	11	20	34	6	1	1	2	6
1996–97	Kiekko–67	FIN.2	43	15	3	18	51	—	—	—	—	—
1997–98	TUTO Hockey	FIN U20	1	1	1	2	0	—	—	—	—	—
1997–98	TUTO Hockey	FIN.2	24	2	4	6	12	—	—	—	—	—
1998–99	Trondheim Black Panthers	NOR	40	7	7	14	12	—	—	—	—	—
1999–2000	Hermes	FIN.2	10	1	1	2	6	—	—	—	—	—
1999–2000	Ahmat Hyvinkää	FIN.2	35	11	9	20	38	—	—	—	—	—
2000–01	TUTO Hockey	Mestis	44	22	11	33	36	10	3	2	5	31
2001–02	TUTO Hockey	Mestis	31	5	6	11	40	4	0	0	0	4
2002–03	TUTO Hockey	Mestis	40	11	5	16	24	—	—	—	—	—
FIN.2/Mestis totals			266	76	51	127	241	20	4	3	7	41

=== International ===
Year	Team	Event	GP	G	A	Pts	PIM
1994	Finland	U17	—	—	—	—	—
1995	Finland	EJC	5	3	4	7	0
Junior totals			5	3	4	7	0
