= Ian MacNeil (ice hockey) =

Canadian ice hockey player

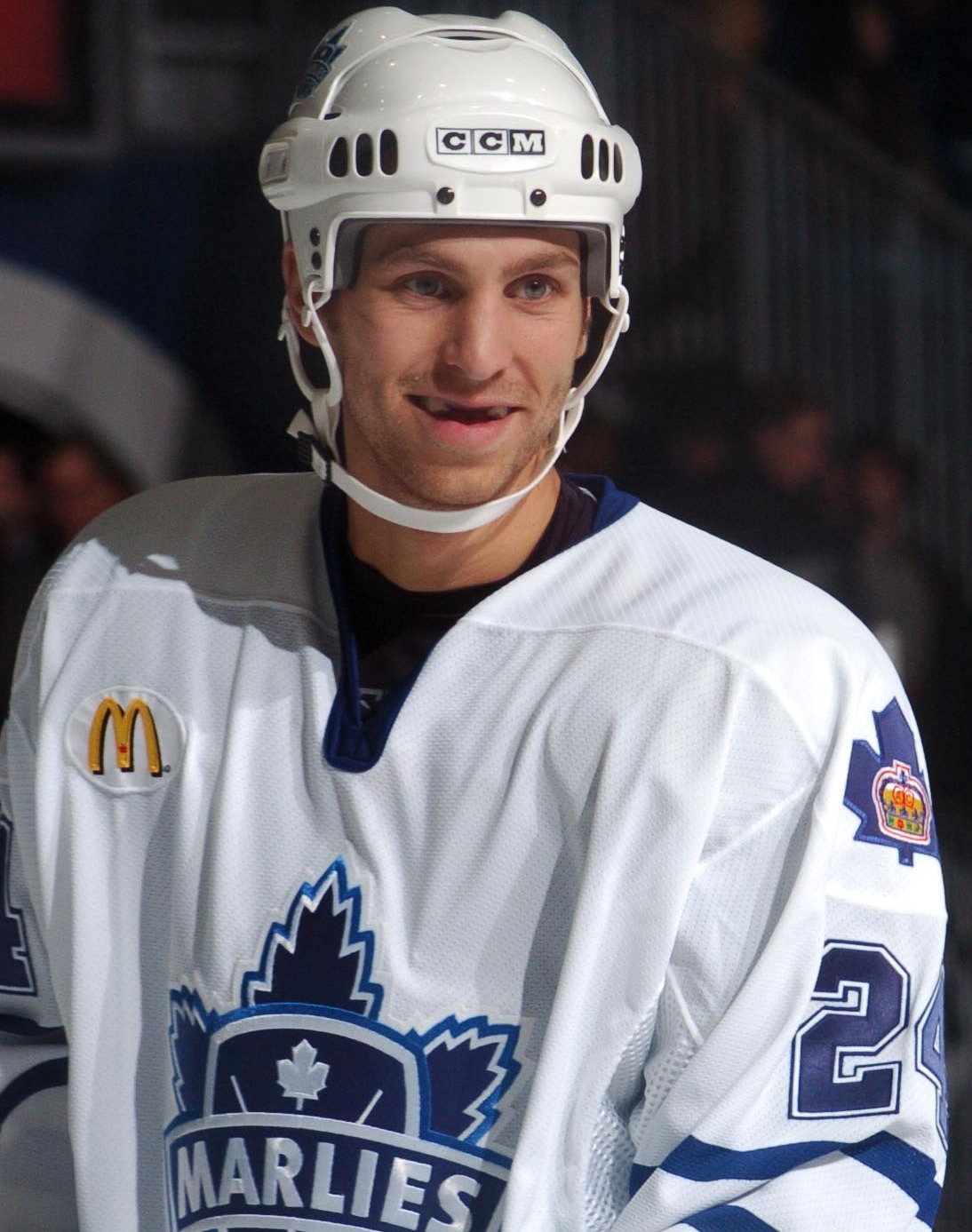
- MacNeil with the Toronto Marlies in 2005
- Born: April 27, 1977 (age 47); Halifax, Nova Scotia, Canada
- Height: 6 ft 2 in (188 cm)
- Weight: 185 lb (84 kg; 13 st 3 lb)
- Position: Centre
- Shot: Left
- Played for: Philadelphia Flyers; Vienna Capitals; Lørenskog IK
- NHL draft: 85th overall, 1995; Hartford Whalers
- Playing career: 1997–2010

Ian MacNeil (born April 27, 1977) is a Canadian former professional ice hockey centre. He played two games in the National Hockey League (NHL) with the Philadelphia Flyers during the 2002–03 season. The rest of his career, which lasted from 1997 to 2010, was spent in the minor leagues and then in Europe.

== Playing career ==
After many years in the AHL, MacNeil played for a short time in Germany. Following a short stint with the AHL team Toronto Marlies, MacNeil found a new home in Europe again. MacNeil last played for the Heilbronner Falken in the 2nd Bundesliga.

== Career statistics ==
=== Regular season and playoffs ===
			Regular season					Playoffs
Season	Team	League	GP	G	A	Pts	PIM	GP	G	A	Pts	PIM
1994–95	Oshawa Generals	OHL	60	7	21	28	62	7	0	2	2	0
1995–96	Oshawa Generals	OHL	49	15	17	32	54	5	1	2	3	8
1996–97	Oshawa Generals	OHL	64	23	20	43	96	18	2	3	5	37
1996–97	Oshawa Generals	M-Cup	—	—	—	—	—	4	2	0	2	6
1997–98	Beast of New Haven	AHL	68	12	21	33	67	3	1	0	1	10
1998–99	Beast of New Haven	AHL	47	6	4	10	62	—	—	—	—	—
1999–00	Cincinnati Cyclones	IHL	81	19	18	37	100	11	3	2	5	25
2000–01	Cincinnati Cyclones	IHL	82	17	22	39	139	5	0	1	1	4
2001–02	Lowell Lock Monsters	AHL	79	14	20	34	128	2	0	1	1	4
2002–03	Philadelphia Flyers	NHL	2	0	0	0	0	—	—	—	—	—
2002–03	Philadelphia Phantoms	AHL	71	10	13	23	132	—	—	—	—	—
2003–04	Philadelphia Phantoms	AHL	71	13	15	28	151	12	2	6	8	34
2004–05	SERC Wild Wings	GER-2	48	21	31	52	175	7	2	2	4	12
2005–06	Toronto Marlies	AHL	20	1	1	2	32	—	—	—	—	—
2005–06	Vienna Capitals	EBEL	24	8	15	23	78	—	—	—	—	—
2006–07	Vaasan Sport	FIN-2	17	9	11	20	26	—	—	—	—	—
2007–08	HC Sierre-Anniviers	NLB	3	3	4	7	2	—	—	—	—	—
2007–08	Lausanne HC	NLB	3	0	0	0	6	—	—	—	—	—
2007–08	Vaasan Sport	FIN-2	31	15	17	32	85	3	1	0	1	14
2008–09	Heilbronner Falken	GER-2	36	13	20	33	71	6	4	4	8	18
2009–10	Lørenskog IK	NOR	29	9	7	16	46	5	2	0	2	18
AHL totals			356	56	74	130	572	17	3	7	10	48
NHL totals			2	0	0	0	0	—	—	—	—	—
