= Igor Melyakov =

Russian ice hockey player

- Born: December 23, 1976 (age 49) Lipetsk, USSR
- Height: 5 ft 11 in (180 cm)
- Weight: 198 lb (90 kg; 14 st 2 lb)
- Position: Forward
- Shot: Left
- Played for: RSL; Yaroslavl Torpedo; Torpedo Nizhny Novgorod; Metallurg Novokuznetsk
- NHL draft: 137th overall, 1995; Los Angeles Kings
- Playing career: 1993–2011

Igor Melyakov (born December 23, 1976) is a Russian professional ice hockey forward. He was selected by Los Angeles Kings in the 6th round (137th overall) of the 1995 NHL entry draft. Melyakov played 1993-2008 in the Russian Superleague.

== Career statistics ==
=== Regular season and playoffs ===
			Regular season					Playoffs
Season	Team	League	GP	G	A	Pts	PIM	GP	G	A	Pts	PIM
1993–94	Torpedo Yaroslavl	IHL	39	3	4	7	10	4	0	0	0	0
1993–94	Torpedo–2 Yaroslavl	RUS.3	4	0	0	0	0	—	—	—	—	—
1994–95	Torpedo Yaroslavl	IHL	50	6	8	14	34	4	0	1	1	0
1994–95	Torpedo–2 Yaroslavl	RUS.2	1	0	1	1	0	—	—	—	—	—
1995–96	Torpedo Yaroslavl	IHL	48	2	5	7	6	3	0	0	0	2
1995–96	Torpedo–2 Yaroslavl	RUS.2	4	2	0	2	0	—	—	—	—	—
1996–97	Torpedo Yaroslavl	RSL	8	0	0	0	0	—	—	—	—	—
1996–97	Torpedo Nizhny Novgorod	RSL	12	3	2	5	10	—	—	—	—	—
1996–97	Torpedo–2 Nizhny Novgorod	RUS.3	3	1	2	3	0	—	—	—	—	—
1997–98	Torpedo Nizhny Novgorod	RSL	13	3	3	6	6	—	—	—	—	—
1998–99	Torpedo Nizhny Novgorod	RUS.2	36	13	16	29	12	—	—	—	—	—
1999–2000	Torpedo Nizhny Novgorod	RSL	34	1	8	9	10	5	1	0	1	4
1999–2000	Torpedo–2 Nizhny Novgorod	RUS.3	1	0	0	0	0	—	—	—	—	—
2000–01	Torpedo Nizhny Novgorod	RSL	25	2	3	5	8	—	—	—	—	—
2000–01	Torpedo–2 Nizhny Novgorod	RUS.3	1	0	2	2	0	—	—	—	—	—
2001–02	HC Lipetsk	RUS.2	56	12	32	44	90	14	5	5	10	4
2002–03	Khimik Voskresensk	RUS.2	38	6	20	26	14	10	3	2	5	2
2003–04	Torpedo Nizhny Novgorod	RSL	45	5	10	15	18	—	—	—	—	—
2003–04	Torpedo–2 Nizhny Novgorod	RUS.3	4	1	6	7	4	—	—	—	—	—
2004–05	Torpedo Nizhny Novgorod	RUS.2	52	14	30	44	32	11	2	4	6	18
2005–06	Metallurg Novokuznetsk	RSL	25	7	8	15	10	3	0	0	0	2
2006–07	Metallurg Novokuznetsk	RSL	22	0	1	1	8	—	—	—	—	—
2006–07	Torpedo Nizhny Novgorod	RUS.2	16	2	6	8	10	12	2	5	7	6
2006–07	Torpedo–2 Nizhny Novgorod	RUS.3	2	3	4	7	2	—	—	—	—	—
2007–08	Torpedo Nizhny Novgorod	RSL	8	1	0	1	6	—	—	—	—	—
2007–08	Torpedo–2 Nizhny Novgorod	RUS.3	3	1	5	6	2	—	—	—	—	—
2007–08	Zauralie Kurgan	RUS.2	24	2	11	13	38	—	—	—	—	—
2008–09	Zauralie Kurgan	RUS.2	46	3	22	25	32	—	—	—	—	—
2009–10	Titan Klin	RUS.2	54	10	25	35	30	13	2	4	6	6
2010–11	Titan Klin	RUS.3	44	7	15	22	26	—	—	—	—	—
IHL & RSL totals			329	35	50	85	126	19	1	1	2	8
RUS.2 totals			327	64	163	227	258	60	14	18	32	36

=== International ===
Year	Team	Event	GP	G	A	Pts	PIM
1994	Russia	EJC	5	1	0	1	4
1995	Russia	WJC	7	6	1	7	2
1996	Russia	WJC	7	1	6	7	6
Junior totals			19	8	7	15	12
