= Sergei Voronov (ice hockey) =

Ice hockey player (1971-)

- Born: 5 February 1971 (age 55) Moscow, Russian SFSR, Soviet Union
- Height: 6 ft 2 in (188 cm)
- Weight: 200 lb (91 kg; 14 st 4 lb)
- Position: Defence
- Shot: Left
- Played for: Dynamo Moscow; Hampton Roads Admirals; Cleveland Lumberjacks; Las Vegas Thunder; Slovan Bratislava; Milano Vipers; Metallurg Magnitogorsk; HC Sibir Novosibirsk
- NHL draft: 206th overall, 1995; Pittsburgh Penguins
- Playing career: 1992–2008

Sergei Voronov (born 5 February 1971) is a Russian former professional hockey defenseman who was active from 1992 until 2008. Voronov was drafted by the Pittsburgh Penguins in the 1995 NHL entry draft, selected in the eighth round (206th overall).

== Career ==
Voronov started his career with HC Dynamo Moscow, playing three years with the club before being drafted by the Pittsburgh Penguins in the 1995 NHL Entry Draft. Voronov attended Pittsburgh Penguins training camp and was initially assigned to the Penguins' IHL affiliate in Cleveland, but after two games with the Lumberjacks he was reassigned to the Penguins' ECHL affiliate in Hampton Roads. After a solid rookie season where Voronov led all Admirals' defensemen with a +24, Voronov quickly fell out of favor with the Admirals, with assistant coach Al MacIssac calling Voronov "the squad's weakest link" and that "he may have cost us the game." Voronov was scratched for game 2 of the Renegades/Admirals series and only returned to the lineup for one additional game during the series.

Despite a poor playoff series against the Renegades during his rookie season, Voronov was reassigned to the Penguins to the Las Vegas Thunder of the International Hockey League to replace Kevin Dahl, who had been recently recalled by the Phoenix Coyotes and were the primary affiliate of the Thunder. General Manager Bob Strumm said he liked the addition of Voronov, saying that he added a "hacking and whacking element that had been missing since the trade of Jeff Ricciardi." While assigned to the Thunder, Voronov was reunited with former Dynamo teammate Alexei Yashin, who were on the same team during the 1992–93 season. Voronov remained with the Thunder for the remainder of the season, scoring six points in 40 games but did not play any games in the postseason. After two seasons in the North American minor leagues, Voronov returned to Russia.

Voronov spent the next 10 out of his 11 seasons in Russia, including four seasons in the Russian Superleague, where he won a championship with the Metallurg Magnitogorsk during the 2000–01 season. He joined Titan Klin of the VHL in 2004 and remained with the team until his retirement in 2008.

Since his retirement, Voronov became an assistant coach with HC MVD and later became head coach of Buran Voronezh.

== Notable achievements ==
- 2000-01, Russian Superleague champion

== Career statistics ==
			Regular season					Playoffs
Season	Team	League	GP	G	A	Pts	PIM	GP	G	A	Pts	PIM
1989–90	Dynamo–2 Moscow	URS.3	51	2	2	4	82	—	—	—	—	—
1990–91	Dynamo–2 Moscow	URS.3	58	6	3	9	117	—	—	—	—	—
1991–92	Dizelist Penza	CIS.2	56	7	7	14	56	—	—	—	—	—
1992–93	Dynamo Moscow	RUS	36	1	0	1	25	10	0	0	0	27
1992–93	Dynamo–2 Moscow	RUS.2	8	2	0	2	14	—	—	—	—	—
1993–94	Dynamo Moscow	RUS	51	5	6	11	72	7	1	0	1	10
1993–94	Dynamo–2 Moscow	RUS.3	2	1	0	1	4	—	—	—	—	—
1994–95	Dynamo Moscow	RUS	44	3	4	7	80	12	4	1	5	26
1994–95	Dynamo–2 Moscow	RUS.2	1	0	0	0	0	—	—	—	—	—
1995–96	Cleveland Lumberjacks	IHL	2	0	0	0	4	—	—	—	—	—
1995–96	Hampton Roads Admirals	ECHL	57	6	23	29	241	2	0	0	0	6
1996–97	Las Vegas Thunder	IHL	40	2	4	6	99	—	—	—	—	—
1997–98	Dynamo Moscow	RSL	12	0	3	3	8	—	—	—	—	—
1997–98	Dynamo–2 Moscow	RUS.2	4	1	2	3	4	—	—	—	—	—
1997–98	HC Slovan Bratislava	SVK	10	0	1	1	4	—	—	—	—	—
1998–99	Severstal Cherepovets	RSL	32	4	6	10	105	2	0	1	1	2
1999–2000	Hockey Club Junior Milano Vipers	—	32	6	23	29	90	—	—	—	—	—
2000–01	Metallurg Magnitogorsk	RSL	42	1	5	6	85	12	0	2	2	14
2001–02	Metallurg Magnitogorsk	RSL	47	1	5	6	83	9	0	0	0	4
2002–03	Sibir Novosibirsk	RSL	49	7	7	14	84	—	—	—	—	—
2003–04	Krylia Sovetov Moscow	RUS.2	28	0	4	4	40	1	0	0	0	2
2003–04	Krylia Sovetov–2 Moscow	RUS.3	2	0	1	1	2	—	—	—	—	—
2003–04	Titan Klin	EEHL	2	1	1	2	27	—	—	—	—	—
2004–05	Titan Klin	RUS.3	44	3	5	8	75	—	—	—	—	—
2005–06	Titan Klin	RUS.3	69	7	15	22	74	—	—	—	—	—
2006–07	Titan Klin	RUS.2	26	3	8	11	75	—	—	—	—	—
2006–07	Titan–2 Klin	RUS.4	4	0	1	1	2	—	—	—	—	—
2007–08	Titan Klin	RUS.2	30	2	2	4	20	—	—	—	—	—
2007–08	Titan–2 Klin	RUS.4	4	1	2	3	10	—	—	—	—	—
RUS & RSL totals			313	22	36	58	542	52	5	4	9	83
RUS.2 totals			97	8	16	24	153	1	0	0	0	2
