= 1995 NHL entry draft =

1995 North American ice hockey draft

General information
- Date: July 8, 1995
- Location: Northlands Coliseum; Edmonton, Alberta, Canada

Overview
- 234 total selections in 9 rounds
- First selection: (United States) Bryan Berard (Ottawa Senators)
- Hall of Famers: 1: RW Jarome Iginla

The 1995 NHL entry draft was the 33rd draft for the National Hockey League. It was held on July 8, 1995 at Northlands Coliseum in Edmonton.

The drafting order was now set partially by a lottery system whereby teams would not be guaranteed first pick if they finished last. Instead, a draft lottery was instituted in which the winner of the lottery could move up a maximum of four spots in the first-round draft order, meaning only the five worst teams, based on regular season points in a given season, could pick first in the draft, and no team in the non-playoff group could move down more than one place. The Los Angeles Kings won the lottery, and thus moved up four spots from seventh to third. The last-place finishers, the Ottawa Senators did not lose the first overall pick through the lottery and picked Bryan Berard. The first three selections were all defencemen. The top two picks swapped teams in a trade the following year.

The last active players in the NHL from this draft class were Shane Doan and Jarome Iginla, who both played their last NHL games in the 2016–17 season.

== Selections by round ==
Club teams are located in North America unless otherwise noted.

=== Round one ===
= NHL All-Star team ·	= NHL All-Star (Note: Players are identified as an All-Star if they were selected for the All-Star game at any time in their career.) ·	= NHL All-Star and NHL All-Star team ·	= Hall of Famers

#	Player	Nationality	NHL team	College/junior/club team
1	Bryan Berard (D)	United States	Ottawa Senators	Detroit Jr. Red Wings (OHL)
2	Wade Redden (D)	Canada	New York Islanders	Brandon Wheat Kings (WHL)
3	Aki Berg (D)	Finland	Los Angeles Kings	TPS (Finland)
4	Chad Kilger (LW)	Canada	Mighty Ducks of Anaheim	Kingston Frontenacs (OHL)
5	Daymond Langkow (C)	Canada	Tampa Bay Lightning	Tri-City Americans (WHL)
6	Steve Kelly (C)	Canada	Edmonton Oilers	Prince Albert Raiders (WHL)
7	Shane Doan (RW)	Canada	Winnipeg Jets	Kamloops Blazers (WHL)
8	Terry Ryan (LW)	Canada	Montreal Canadiens	Tri-City Americans (WHL)
9	Kyle McLaren (D)	Canada	Boston Bruins (from Hartford)^{1}	Tacoma Rockets (WHL)
10	Radek Dvorak (RW)	Czech Republic	Florida Panthers	HC Ceske Budejovice (Czech Republic)
11	Jarome Iginla (RW)	Canada	Dallas Stars	Kamloops Blazers (WHL)
12	Teemu Riihijarvi (LW)	Finland	San Jose Sharks	Kiekko-Espoo (Finland)
13	Jean-Sebastien Giguere (G)	Canada	Hartford Whalers (from New York Rangers)^{2}	Halifax Mooseheads (QMJHL)
14	Jay McKee (D)	Canada	Buffalo Sabres (from Vancouver)^{3}	Niagara Falls Thunder (OHL)
15	Jeff Ware (D)	Canada	Toronto Maple Leafs	Oshawa Generals (OHL)
16	Martin Biron (G)	Canada	Buffalo Sabres	Beauport Harfangs (QMJHL)
17	Brad Church (LW)	Canada	Washington Capitals	Prince Albert Raiders (WHL)
18	Petr Sykora (RW)	Czech Republic	New Jersey Devils	Detroit Vipers (IHL)
19	Dmitri Nabokov (RW)	Russia	Chicago Blackhawks	Krylya Sovetov (Russia)
20	Denis Gauthier (D)	Canada	Calgary Flames	Drummondville Voltigeurs (QMJHL)
21	Sean Brown (D)	Canada	Boston Bruins	Belleville Bulls (OHL)
22	Brian Boucher (G)	United States	Philadelphia Flyers	Tri-City Americans (WHL)
23	Miika Elomo (C)	Finland	Washington Capitals (from St. Louis)^{4}	Kiekko-67 Turku (Finland)
24	Aleksey Morozov (RW)	Russia	Pittsburgh Penguins	Krylya Sovetov (Russia)
25	Marc Denis (G)	Canada	Colorado Avalanche	Chicoutimi Sagueneens (QMJHL)
26	Maxim Kuznetsov (D)	Russia	Detroit Red Wings	Dynamo Moscow (Russia)

1. Hartford's first-round pick went to Boston as the result of a trade on August 26, 1994 that sent Glen Wesley to Hartford in exchange for first-round picks of the 1996 entry draft and the 1997 entry draft along with this pick.
2. The Rangers' first-round pick went to Hartford as the result of a trade on March 23, 1995 that sent Pat Verbeek to the Rangers in exchange for Glen Featherstone, Michael Stewart, a fourth-round in the 1996 entry draft and this pick.
3. Vancouver's fifth-round pick went to Buffalo as the result of a trade on July 8, 1995 that sent Alexander Mogilny and a fifth-round pick in the 1995 entry draft to Vancouver in exchange for Michael Peca, Mike Wilson and this pick.
4. Washington acquired this pick with first-round picks in the 1991 entry draft, 1992 entry draft, 1993 entry draft and 1994 entry draft as compensation on July 16, 1990 after St. Louis signed free agent Scott Stevens.

=== Round two ===
#	Player	Nationality	NHL team	College/junior/club team
27	Marc Moro (D)	Canada	Ottawa Senators	Kingston Frontenacs (OHL)
28	Jan Hlavac (LW)	Czech Republic	New York Islanders	Sparta Prague (Czech Republic)
29	Brian Wesenberg (RW)	Canada	Mighty Ducks of Anaheim	Guelph Storm (OHL)
30	Mike McBain (D)	Canada	Tampa Bay Lightning	Red Deer Rebels (WHL)
31	Georges Laraque (RW)	Canada	Edmonton Oilers	Saint-Jean Lynx (QMJHL)
32	Marc Chouinard (C)	Canada	Winnipeg Jets	Beauport Harfangs (QMJHL)
33	Donald MacLean (C)	Canada	Los Angeles Kings	Beauport Harfangs (QMJHL)
34	Jason Doig (D)	Canada	Winnipeg Jets (from Montreal)^{1}	Laval Titan College Francais (QMJHL)
35	Sergei Fedotov (D)	Russia	Hartford Whalers	Dynamo Moscow (Russia)
36	Aaron MacDonald (G)	Canada	Florida Panthers	Swift Current Broncos (WHL)
37	Patrick Cote (LW)	Canada	Dallas Stars	Beauport Harfangs (QMJHL)
38	Peter Roed (C)	United States	San Jose Sharks	White Bear Lake High School (USHS–MN)
39	Christian Dube (C)	Canada	New York Rangers	Sherbrooke Faucons (QMJHL)
40	Chris McAllister (LW)	Canada	Vancouver Canucks	Saskatoon Blades (WHL)
41	D. J. Smith (D)	Canada	New York Islanders (from Toronto)^{2}	Windsor Spitfires (OHL)
42	Mark Dutiaume (LW)	Canada	Buffalo Sabres	Brandon Wheat Kings (WHL)
43	Dwayne Hay (LW)	Canada	Washington Capitals	Guelph Storm (OHL)
44	Nathan Perrott (RW)	Canada	New Jersey Devils	Oshawa Generals (OHL)
45	Christian Laflamme (D)	Canada	Chicago Blackhawks	Beauport Harfangs (QMJHL)
46	Pavel Smirnov (C)	Russia	Calgary Flames	Molot Perm (Russia)
47	Paxton Schafer (G)	Canada	Boston Bruins	Medicine Hat Tigers (WHL)
48	Shane Kenny (D)	Canada	Philadelphia Flyers	Owen Sound Platers (OHL)
49	Jochen Hecht (C)	Germany	St. Louis Blues	Adler Mannheim (Germany)
50	Pavel Rosa (RW)	Czech Republic	Los Angeles Kings (from Pittsburgh)^{3}	HC Litvinov (Czech Republic)
51	Nic Beaudoin (LW)	Canada	Colorado Avalanche	Detroit Jr. Red Wings (OHL)
52	Philippe Audet (LW)	Canada	Detroit Red Wings	Granby Bisons (QMJHL)

1. Montreal's second-round pick went to Winnipeg as the result of a trade on July 8, 1995 that sent Stephan Quintal to Montreal in exchange for this pick.
2. Toronto's second-round pick went to the Islanders as the result of a trade on June 28, 1994 that sent the Islanders' third-round pick in the 1994 entry draft to Toronto in exchange for this pick.
3. Pittsburgh's second-round pick went to Los Angeles as the result of a trade on July 29, 1994 that sent Luc Robitaille to Pittsburgh in exchange for Rick Tocchet and this pick.

=== Round three ===
#	Player	Nationality	NHL team	College/junior/club team
53	Brad Larsen (LW)	Canada	Ottawa Senators	Swift Current Broncos (WHL)
54	Ryan Pepperall (RW)	Canada	Toronto Maple Leafs (from New York Islanders)^{1}	Kitchener Rangers (OHL)
55	Mike Leclerc (LW)	Canada	Mighty Ducks of Anaheim	Brandon Wheat Kings (WHL)
56	Shane Willis (LW)	Canada	Tampa Bay Lightning	Prince Albert Raiders (WHL)
57	Lukas Zib (D)	Czech Republic	Edmonton Oilers	HC Ceske Budejovice (Czech Republic)
58	Darryl Laplante (C)	Canada	Detroit Red Wings (from Winnipeg)^{2}	Moose Jaw Warriors (WHL)
59	Vladimir Tsyplakov (LW)	Belarus	Los Angeles Kings	Fort Wayne Komets (IHL)
60	Miloslav Guren (D)	Czech Republic	Montreal Canadiens	RI OKNA Zlin (Czech Republic)
61	Larry Courville (LW)	Canada	Vancouver Canucks (from Hartford via Chicago)^{3}	Oshawa Generals (OHL)
62	Mike O'Grady (D)	Canada	Florida Panthers	Lethbridge Hurricanes (WHL)
63	Petr Buzek (D)	Czech Republic	Dallas Stars	Dukla Jihlava (Czech Republic)
64	Marko Makinen (LW)	Finland	San Jose Sharks	TPS (Finland)
65	Mike Martin (D)	Canada	New York Rangers	Windsor Spitfires (OHL)
66	Peter Schaefer (LW)	Canada	Vancouver Canucks	Brandon Wheat Kings (WHL)
67	Brad Isbister (LW)	Canada	Winnipeg Jets (from Toronto)^{4}	Portland Winter Hawks (WHL)
68	Mathieu Sunderland (RW)	Canada	Buffalo Sabres	Drummondville Voltigeurs (QMJHL)
69	Sergei Gusev (D)	Russia	Dallas Stars (from Washington via Winnipeg)^{5}	Mayak Samara (Russia)
70	Sergei Vyshedkevich (D)	Russia	New Jersey Devils	Dynamo Moscow (Russia)
71	Kevin McKay (D)	Canada	Chicago Blackhawks (from Chicago via Winnipeg)^{6}	Moose Jaw Warriors (WHL)
72	Rocky Thompson (RW)	Canada	Calgary Flames	Medicine Hat Tigers (WHL)
73	Bill McCauley (D)	United States	Boston Bruins	Detroit Jr. Red Wings (OHL)
74	Martin Hohenberger (LW)	Austria	Montreal Canadiens (from Philadelphia)^{7}	Prince George Cougars (WHL)
75	Scott Roche (G)	Canada	St. Louis Blues	North Bay Centennials (OHL)
76	Jean-Sebastien Aubin (G)	Canada	Pittsburgh Penguins	Sherbrooke Faucons (QMJHL)
77	John Tripp (RW)	Canada	Colorado Avalanche	Oshawa Generals (OHL)
78	David Gosselin (LW)	Canada	New Jersey Devils (from Detroit)^{8}	Sherbrooke Faucons (QMJHL)

1. The Islanders' third-round pick went to Toronto as the result of a trade on April 6, 1995 that sent Eric Fichaud to the Islanders in exchange for Benoit Hogue, a fifth-round pick in the 1996 entry draft and this pick.
2. Winnipeg's third-round pick went to Detroit as the result of a trade on May 25, 1994 that sent Sheldon Kennedy to Winnipeg in exchange for this pick.
3. Chicago's third-round pick went to Vancouver as the result of a trade on April 7, 1995 that sent Gerald Diduck to Chicago in exchange for Bogdan Savenko and this pick.
  Chicago previously acquired this pick as the result of a trade with Hartford on March 11, 1993 that sent the Frantisek Kucera and Jocelyn Lemieux to Hartford in exchange for Randy Cunneyworth, Gary Suter and this pick.
4. Toronto's third-round pick went to Winnipeg as the result of a trade on April 7, 1995 that sent Tie Domi to Toronto in exchange for Mike Eastwood and this pick.
5. Winnipeg's third-round pick went to Dallas as the result of a trade on July 8, 1995 that sent a second-round pick in the 1995 entry draft to Winnipeg in exchange for this pick.
  Winnipeg previously acquired this pick as the result of a trade on April 7, 1995 that sent Mike Eagles and Igor Ulanov to Washington in exchange for a fifth-round pick in the 1995 entry draft and this pick.
6. Chicago's third-round pick was re-acquired as the result of a trade on June 3, 1994 that sent Neil Wilkinson to Winnipeg in exchange for this pick.
  Chicago's third-round pick went to Winnipeg as the result of a trade on March 21, 1994 that sent Paul Ysebaert to Chicago in exchange for this pick.
7. Philadelphia's third-round pick went to Montreal as the result of a trade on February 9, 1995 that sent Eric Desjardins, Gilbert Dionne and John LeClair to Philadelphia in exchange for Mark Recchi and this pick.
8. Detroit's third-round pick went to New Jersey as the result of a trade on April 3, 1995 that sent Vyacheslav Fetisov to Detroit in exchange for this pick.

=== Round four ===
#	Player	Nationality	NHL team	College/junior/club team
79	Alyn McCauley (C)	Canada	New Jersey Devils (from Ottawa)^{1}	Ottawa 67's (OHL)
80	Dave Duerden (LW)	Canada	Florida Panthers (from New York Islanders)^{2}	Peterborough Petes (OHL)
81	Tomi Kallio (RW)	Finland	Colorado Avalanche (from Anaheim)^{3}	Kiekko-67 Turku (Finland)
82	Chris Van Dyk (D)	Canada	Chicago Blackhawks (from Tampa Bay via Anaheim)^{4}	Windsor Spitfires (OHL)
83	Mike Minard (G)	Canada	Edmonton Oilers	Chilliwack Chiefs (BCJHL)
84	Justin Kurtz (D)	Canada	Winnipeg Jets	Brandon Wheat Kings (WHL)
85	Ian MacNeil (C)	Canada	Hartford Whalers (from Los Angeles)^{5}	Oshawa Generals (OHL)
86	Jonathan Delisle (RW)	Canada	Montreal Canadiens	Hull Olympiques (QMJHL)
87	Sami Kapanen (RW)	Finland	Hartford Whalers	HIFK (Finland)
88	Daniel Tjarnqvist (D)	Sweden	Florida Panthers	Rogle BK (Sweden)
89	Kevin Bolibruck (D)	Canada	Ottawa Senators (from Dallas via Florida)^{6}	Peterborough Petes (OHL)
90	Vesa Toskala (G)	Finland	San Jose Sharks	Ilves (Finland)
91	Marc Savard (C)	Canada	New York Rangers	Oshawa Generals (OHL)
92	Lloyd Shaw (D)	Canada	Vancouver Canucks	Seattle Thunderbirds (WHL)
93	Sebastien Charpentier (G)	Canada	Washington Capitals (from Toronto)^{7}	Laval Titan College Francais (QMJHL)
94	Matt Davidson (RW)	Canada	Buffalo Sabres	Portland Winter Hawks (WHL)
95	Joel Theriault (D)	Canada	Washington Capitals	Beauport Harfangs (QMJHL)
96	Henrik Rehnberg (D)	Sweden	New Jersey Devils	Farjestad BK (Sweden)
97	Pavel Kriz (D)	Czech Republic	Chicago Blackhawks	Tri-City Americans (WHL)
98	Jan Labraaten (LW)	Sweden	Calgary Flames	Farjestad BK (Sweden)
99	Cameron Mann (RW)	Canada	Boston Bruins	Peterborough Petes (OHL)
100	Radovan Somik (RW)	Slovakia	Philadelphia Flyers (from Philadelphia via Tampa Bay)^{8}	Martimex ZTS Martin (Slovakia)
101	Michal Handzus (C)	Slovakia	St. Louis Blues	Iskra Banska Bystrica (Slovakia)
102	Oleg Belov (C)	Russia	Pittsburgh Penguins	CSKA Moscow (Russia)
103	Kevin Boyd (LW)	Canada	Ottawa Senators (from Colorado)^{9}	London Knights (OHL)
104	Anatoli Ustyugov (LW)	Russia	Detroit Red Wings	Torpedo Yaroslavl (Russia)

1. Ottawa's fourth-round pick went to New Jersey as the result of a trade on July 8, 1995 that sent Jaroslav Modry to Ottawa in exchange for this pick.
2. The Islanders' fourth-round pick went to Florida as the result of a trade on March 3, 1995 that sent Brent Severyn to the Islanders in exchange for this pick.
3. Anaheim's fourth-round pick went to Quebec as the result of a trade on February 20, 1994 that sent John Tanner to Anaheim in exchange for this pick.
4. Anaheim's fourth-round pick went to Chicago as the result of a trade on July 12, 1994 that sent Robert Dirk to Anaheim in exchange for this pick.
  Anaheim previously acquired this pick as the result of a trade with Tampa Bay on June 29, 1994 that sent a third-round pick in 1994 entry draft to Anaheim in exchange for a third-round pick in 1994 entry draft and this pick.
5. Los Angeles' fourth-round pick went to Hartford as the result of a trade on May 31, 1995 that sent Jan Vopat to Los Angeles in exchange for this pick.
6. Florida's fourth-round pick went to Ottawa as the result of a trade on January 6, 1994 that sent Bob Kudelski to Florida in exchange for Evgeny Davydov, Scott Levins, a sixth-round pick in the 1994 entry draft and this pick.
  Florida previously acquired this pick as the result of a trade with Dallas on December 16, 1993 that sent Jim McKenzie to Dallas in exchange for a fourth-round pick in 1994 entry draft or 1995 entry draft (this pick).
7. Toronto's fourth-round pick went to Washington as the result of a trade on February 10, 1995 that sent Warren Rychel to Toronto in exchange for this pick.
8. Philadelphia's fourth-round pick was re-acquired as the result of a trade on September 6, 1994 that sent Alex Selivanov to Tampa Bay in exchange for this pick.
  Philadelphia's fourth-round pick went to Tampa Bay as the result of a trade on March 18, 1994 that sent Rob DiMaio to Philadelphia in exchange for Jim Cummins and this pick.
9. Colorado's fourth-round pick went to Ottawa as the result of a trade on April 7, 1995 that sent Bill Huard to Quebec in exchange for rights to Mika Stromberg and this pick. Quebec relocated to Denver to become the Colorado Avalanche after the 1994–95 NHL season.

=== Round five ===
#	Player	Nationality	NHL team	College/junior/club team
105	Benoit Gratton (C)	Canada	Washington Capitals (from Ottawa)^{1}	Laval Titan College Francais (QMJHL)
106	Vladimir Orszagh (RW)	Slovakia	New York Islanders	Iskra Banska Bystrica (Slovakia)
107	Igor Nikulin (RW)	Russia	Mighty Ducks of Anaheim	HC Severstal (Russia)
108	Konstantin Golokhvastov (RW)	Russia	Tampa Bay Lightning (from Tampa Bay via St. Louis, Tampa Bay and Washington)^{2}	Dynamo Moscow (Russia)
109	Jan Snopek (D)	Czech Republic	Edmonton Oilers	Oshawa Generals (OHL)
110	Alexei Vasiliev (D)	Russia	New York Rangers (from Winnipeg)^{3}	Torpedo Yaroslavl (Russia)
111	Marian Menhart (D)	Czech Republic	Buffalo Sabres (from Los Angeles)^{4}	HC Litvinov (Czech Republic)
112	Niklas Anger (RW)	Sweden	Montreal Canadiens	Djurgardens IF (Sweden)
113	Hugh Hamilton (D)	Canada	Hartford Whalers	Spokane Chiefs (WHL)
114	Francois Cloutier (LW)	Canada	Florida Panthers	Hull Olympiques (QMJHL)
115	Wade Strand (D)	Canada	Dallas Stars	Regina Pats (WHL)
116	Miikka Kiprusoff (G)	Finland	San Jose Sharks	TPS Jr. (Finland)
117	Dale Purinton (D)	United States	New York Rangers	Tacoma Rockets (WHL)
118	Jason Morgan (C)	Canada	Los Angeles Kings (from Vancouver via Dallas)^{5}	Kingston Frontenacs (OHL)
119	Kevin Popp (D)	Canada	Buffalo Sabres (from Toronto)^{6}	Seattle Thunderbirds (WHL)
120	Todd Norman (LW)	Canada	Vancouver Canucks (from Buffalo)^{7}	Guelph Storm (OHL)
121	Brian Elder (G)	Canada	Winnipeg Jets (from Washington)^{8}	Brandon Wheat Kings (WHL)
122	Chris Mason (G)	Canada	New Jersey Devils	Prince George Cougars (WHL)
123	Daniel Bienvenue (LW)	Canada	Buffalo Sabres (from Chicago)^{9}	Val-d'Or Foreurs (QMJHL)
124	Joel Cort (D)	Canada	Washington Capitals (from Calgary)^{10}	Guelph Storm (OHL)
125	Chad Wilchynski (D)	Canada	Detroit Red Wings (from Boston)^{11}	Regina Pats (WHL)
126	Dave Arsenault (G)	Canada	Detroit Red Wings (from Philadelphia)^{12}	Drummondville Voltigeurs (QMJHL)
127	Jeffrey Ambrosio (LW)	Canada	St. Louis Blues	Belleville Bulls (OHL)
128	Jan Hrdina (C)	Czech Republic	Pittsburgh Penguins	Seattle Thunderbirds (WHL)
129	Brent Johnson (G)	United States	Colorado Avalanche	Owen Sound Platers (OHL)
130	Michal Bros (C)	Czech Republic	San Jose Sharks (from Detroit)^{13}	HC Olomouc (Czech Republic)

1. Ottawa's fifth-round pick went to Washington as the result of a trade on January 18, 1995 that sent Don Beaupre to Ottawa in exchange for this pick.
2. Tampa Bay's fifth-round pick was re-acquired as the result of a trade on March 21, 1994, that sent Joe Reekie to Washington in exchange for Enrico Ciccone and a conditional fifth round pick (this pick). Conditions of this draft pick are unknown.
  Tampa Bay's fifth-round pick went to Washington as the result of a trade on October 22, 1993 that sent Pat Elynuik to Tampa Bay in exchange for a conditional fifth round pick (this pick). Conditions of this draft pick are unknown.
  Tampa Bay's fourth-round pick was re-acquired as the result of a trade on January 28, 1993, that sent Basil McRae, Doug Crossman and a fourth-round pick in the 1996 entry draft to St. Louis in exchange for Jason Ruff, Tampa Bay's fourth-round pick in 1994 entry draft, sixth-round pick in 1996 entry draft and this pick.
  Tampa Bay's fifth-round pick went to St. Louis as the result of a trade on June 19, 1992 that sent Pat Jablonski, Darin Kimble, Rob Robinson and Steve Tuttle to Tampa Bay in exchange for Tampa Bay's fourth-round pick in the 1994 entry draft, a sixth-round pick in the 1996 entry draft and this pick.
3. Winnipeg's fifth-round pick went to the Rangers as the result of a trade on June 7, 1995 that sent Ed Olczyk to Winnipeg in exchange for this pick.
4. Los Angeles' fifth-round pick went to Buffalo as the result of a trade on February 14, 1995 that sent Philippe Boucher, Grant Fuhr and Denis Tsygurov to Los Angeles in exchange for Charlie Huddy, Robb Stauber, Alexei Zhitnik and this pick.
5. Dallas' fifth-round pick went to Los Angeles as the result of a trade on June 7, 1995 that sent Jeff Mitchell to Dallas in exchange for this pick.
  Dallas previously acquired this pick as the result of a trade on April 7, 1995 that sent Russ Courtnall to Vancouver in exchange for Greg Adams, Dan Kesa and this pick.
6. Toronto's fifth-round pick went to Buffalo as the result of a trade on February 2, 1993 that sent Dave Andreychuk, Daren Puppa and Buffalo's first-round pick in the 1993 entry draft to Buffalo in exchange for Grant Fuhr and this pick.
7. Buffalo's fifth-round pick went to Vancouver as the result of a trade on July 8, 1995 that sent Michael Peca, Mike Wilson and a first-round pick in the 1995 entry draft to Buffalo in exchange for Alexander Mogilny and this pick.
8. Washington's fifth-round pick went to Winnipeg as the result of a trade on April 7, 1995 that sent Mike Eagles and Igor Ulanov to Washington in exchange for a third-round pick in the 1995 entry draft and this pick.
9. Chicago's fifth-round pick went to Buffalo as the result of a trade on October 26, 1993 that sent Keith Carney and a sixth-round pick in the 1995 entry draft to Chicago in exchange for Craig Muni and this pick.
10. Calgary's fifth-round pick went to Washington as the result of a trade on April 7, 1995 that sent Rick Tabaracci to Calgary in exchange for this pick.
11. Boston's fifth-round pick went to Detroit as the result of a trade on January 17, 1994 that sent Vincent Riendeau to Boston in exchange for this pick.
12. Philadelphia's fifth-round pick went to Detroit as the result of a trade on September 9, 1993 that sent Stewart Malgunas to Philadelphia in exchange for this pick.
13. Detroit's fifth-round pick went to San Jose as the result of a trade on February 27, 1995 that sent Bob Errey to Detroit in exchange for this pick.

=== Round six ===
#	Player	Nationality	NHL team	College/junior/club team
131	David Hruska (RW)	Czech Republic	Ottawa Senators	Sokolov (Czech Republic)
132	Dmitri Tertyshny (D)	Russia	Philadelphia Flyers (from the Islanders)^{1}	Traktor Chelyabinsk (Russia)
133	Peter Leboutillier (RW)	Canada	Mighty Ducks of Anaheim	Red Deer Rebels (WHL)
134	Eduard Pershin (C)	Russia	Tampa Bay Lightning	Moscow Dynamo (Russia)
135	Jamie Sokolsky (D)	Canada	Philadelphia Flyers (from Edmonton)^{2}	Belleville Bulls (OHL)
136	Sylvain Daigle (G)	Canada	Winnipeg Jets	Shawinigan Cataractes (QMJHL)
137	Igor Melyakov (RW)	Russia	Los Angeles Kings	Torpedo Yaroslavl (Russia)
138	Boyd Olson (C)	Canada	Montreal Canadiens	Tri-City Americans (WHL)
139	Doug Bonner (G)	United States	Toronto Maple Leafs (from Hartford)^{3}	Seattle Thunderbirds (WHL)
140	Timo Hakanen (C)	Finland	San Jose Sharks (from Florida)^{4}	Assat Jr. (Finland)
141	Dominic Marleau (D)	Canada	Dallas Stars	Victoriaville Tigres (QMJHL)
142	Jaroslav Kudrna (LW)	Czech Republic	San Jose Sharks	Penticton Panthers (BCJHL)
143	Peter Slamiar (RW)	Slovakia	New York Rangers	HKm Zvolen Jr. (Slovakia)
144	Brent Sopel (D)	Canada	Vancouver Canucks	Swift Current Broncos (WHL)
145	Yannick Tremblay (D)	Canada	Toronto Maple Leafs	Beauport Harfangs (QMJHL)
146	Marc Magliarditi (G)	United States	Chicago Blackhawks (from Buffalo)^{5}	Des Moines Buccaneers (USHL)
147	Frederick Jobin (LW)	Canada	Washington Capitals	Laval Titan College Francais (QMJHL)
148	Adam Young (D)	Canada	New Jersey Devils	Windsor Spitfires (OHL)
149	Marty Wilford (D)	Canada	Chicago Blackhawks	Oshawa Generals (OHL)
150	Clarke Wilm (C)	Canada	Calgary Flames	Saskatoon Blades (WHL)
151	Evgeny Shaldybin (D)	Russia	Boston Bruins	Yaroslavl Torpedo (Russia)
152	Martin Spanhel (LW)	Czech Republic	Philadelphia Flyers	RI OKNA Zlin Jr. (Czech Republic)
153	Denis Hamel (LW)	Canada	St. Louis Blues (from St. Louis via Anaheim)^{6}	Chicoutimi Sagueneens (QMJHL)
154	Alexei Kolkunov (C)	Russia	Pittsburgh Penguins	Krylya Sovetov (Russia)
155	John Cirjak (RW)	Canada	Colorado Avalanche	Spokane Chiefs (WHL)
156	Tyler Perry (C)	Canada	Detroit Red Wings	Seattle Thunderbirds (WHL)

1. The Islanders' sixth-round pick went to Philadelphia as the result of a trade on September 22, 1994 that sent Tommy Soderstrom to the Islanders in exchange for Ron Hextall and this pick.
2. Edmonton's sixth-round pick went to Philadelphia as the result of a trade on March 13, 1995 that sent Ryan McGill to Edmonton in exchange for Brad Zavisha and this pick.
3. Hartford's sixth-round pick went to Toronto as the result of a trade on January 25, 1994 that sent Ted Crowley to Hartford in exchange for Mark Greig and this pick.
4. Florida's sixth-round pick went to San Jose as the result of a trade on April 7, 1995 that sent Gaetan Duchesne to Florida in exchange for this pick.
5. Buffalo's sixth-round pick went to Chicago as the result of a trade on October 26, 1993 that sent Craig Muni and a fifth-round pick in the 1995 entry draft to Buffalo in exchange for Keith Carney and this pick.
6. St. Louis' sixth-round pick (# 153 overall) was re-acquired as the result of a trade on July 8, 1995, that sent a sixth-round pick (# 149 overall) in the 1995 entry draft to Anaheim in exchange for this pick.
  St. Louis' sixth-round pick went to Anaheim as the result of a trade on March 21, 1993 that sent Alexei Kasatonov to St. Louis in exchange for Maxim Bets and this pick.

=== Round seven ===
#	Player	Nationality	NHL team	College/junior/club team
157	Benoit Larose (D)	Canada	Los Angeles Kings (from Ottawa)^{1}	Sherbrooke Faucons (QMJHL)
158	Andrew Taylor (LW)	Canada	New York Islanders	Detroit Jr. Red Wings (OHL)
159	Mike LaPlante (D)	Canada	Mighty Ducks of Anaheim	Calgary Royals (AJHL)
160	Cory Murphy (D)	Canada	Tampa Bay Lightning	Sault Ste. Marie Greyhounds (OHL)
161	Martin Cerven (C)	Slovakia	Edmonton Oilers	Dukla Trencin (Slovakia)
162	Paul Traynor (D)	Canada	Winnipeg Jets	Kitchener Rangers (OHL)
163	Juha Vuorivirta (C)	Finland	Los Angeles Kings	Tappara (Finland)
164	Stephane Robidas (D)	Canada	Montreal Canadiens	Shawinigan Cataractes (QMJHL)
165	Byron Ritchie (C)	Canada	Hartford Whalers	Lethbridge Hurricanes (WHL)
166	Peter Worrell (LW)	Canada	Florida Panthers	Hull Olympiques (QMJHL)
167	Brad Mehalko (RW)	Canada	San Jose Sharks (from Dallas)^{2}	Lethbridge Hurricanes (WHL)
168	Robert Jindrich (D)	Czech Republic	San Jose Sharks	Interconnex Plzen (Czech Republic)
169	Jeff Heil (G)	United States	New York Rangers	University of Wisconsin–River Falls (WCHA)
170	Stu Boedker (C)	Canada	Vancouver Canucks	Colorado College (WCHA)
171	Marek Melenovsky (C)	Czech Republic	Toronto Maple Leafs	Dukla Jihlava Jr. (Czech Republic)
172	Brian Scott (LW)	Canada	Buffalo Sabres	Kitchener Rangers (OHL)
173	Jeff Dewar (RW)	Canada	Dallas Stars (from Washington)^{3}	Moose Jaw Warriors (WHL)
174	Richard Rochefort (C)	Canada	New Jersey Devils	Sudbury Wolves (OHL)
175	Steve Tardif (C)	Canada	Chicago Blackhawks	Drummondville Voltigeurs (QMJHL)
176	Ryan Gillis (D)	Canada	Calgary Flames	North Bay Centennials (OHL)
177	Per-Johan Axelsson (LW)	Sweden	Boston Bruins	Vastra Frolunda HC (Sweden)
178	Martin Streit (RW)	Czech Republic	Philadelphia Flyers	HC Olomouc (Czech.)
179	Jean-Luc Grand-Pierre (D)	Canada	St. Louis Blues	Val-d'Or Foreurs (QMJHL)
180	Derrick Pyke (RW)	Canada	Pittsburgh Penguins	Halifax Mooseheads (QMJHL)
181	Dan Smith (D)	Canada	Colorado Avalanche	University of British Columbia (CIAU)
182	Per Eklund (RW)	Sweden	Detroit Red Wings	Djurgardens IF (Sweden)

1. Ottawa's seventh-round pick went to Los Angeles as the result of a trade on June 25, 1994 that sent Jim Paek to Ottawa in exchange for this pick.
2. Dallas' seventh-round pick went to San Jose as the result of a trade on March 19, 1994 that sent Mike Lalor and Doug Zmolek to Dallas in exchange for Ulf Dahlen and this pick.
3. Washington's seventh-round pick went to Dallas as the result of a trade on March 21, 1994 that sent Jim Johnson to Washington in exchange for Alan May and this pick.

=== Round eight ===
#	Player	Nationality	NHL team	College/junior/club team
183	Kaj Linna (D)	Finland	Ottawa Senators	Boston University (Hockey East)
184	Ray Schultz (D)	Canada	Ottawa Senators (from NY Islanders via Boston)^{1}	Tri-City Americans (WHL)
185	Igor Karpenko (G)	UKR	Mighty Ducks of Anaheim	Sokil Kyiv (Ukraine)
186	Joe Cardarelli (LW)	Canada	Tampa Bay Lightning	Spokane Chiefs (WHL)
187	Stephen Douglas (D)	Canada	Edmonton Oilers	Niagara Falls Thunder (OHL)
188	Jaroslav Obsut (D)	Slovakia	Winnipeg Jets	North Battleford North Stars (SJHL)
189	Fredrik Loven (C)	Sweden	Winnipeg Jets (from Los Angeles)^{2}	Djurgardens IF (Sweden)
190	Greg Hart (RW)	Canada	Montreal Canadiens	Kamloops Blazers (WHL)
191	Milan Kostolny (RW)	Slovakia	Hartford Whalers	Detroit Jr. Red Wings (OHL)
192	Filip Kuba (D)	Czech Republic	Florida Panthers	HC Vitkovice (Czech Republic)
193	Anatoli Koveshnikov (LW)	UKR	Dallas Stars	Sokil Kyiv (Ukraine)
194	Ryan Kraft (C)	United States	San Jose Sharks	University of Minnesota (WCHA)
195	Ilya Gorokhov (D)	Russia	New York Rangers	Torpedo Yaroslavl (Russia)
196	Tyler Willis (RW)	Canada	Vancouver Canucks	Swift Current Broncos (WHL)
197	Mark Murphy (LW)	United States	Toronto Maple Leafs	Stratford Cullitons (MWJBHL)
198	Mike Zanutto (C)	Canada	Buffalo Sabres	Oshawa Generals (OHL)
199	Vasili Turkovsky (D)	Russia	Washington Capitals	CSKA Moscow (Russia)
200	Frederic Henry (G)	Canada	New Jersey Devils	Granby Bisons (QMJHL)
201	Casey Hankinson (LW)	United States	Chicago Blackhawks	University of Minnesota (WCHA)
202	Sergei Luchinkin (C)	Russia	Dallas Stars (from Calgary)^{3}	Dynamo Moscow (Russia)
203	Sergei Zhukov (D)	Russia	Boston Bruins	Torpedo Yaroslavl (Russia)
204	Ruslan Shafikov (C)	Russia	Philadelphia Flyers	Salavat Yulaev Ufa (Russia)
205	Derek Bekar (C)	Canada	St. Louis Blues	Powell River Paper Kings (BCJHL)
206	Sergei Voronov (D)	Russia	Pittsburgh Penguins	Dynamo Moscow (Russia)
207	Tomi Hirvonen (C)	Finland	Colorado Avalanche	Ilves Jrs. (Finland)
208	Andrei Samokhvalov (RW)	Kazakhstan	Detroit Red Wings	Torpedo Ust-Kamenogorsk (Kazakhstan)

1. Boston's eight-round pick went to Ottawa as the result of a trade on April 7, 1995 that sent Craig Billington to Boston in exchange for this pick..
  Boston previously acquired this pick as the result of a trade on February 10, 1995 that sent Paul Stanton to the Islanders in exchange for this pick.
2. Los Angeles' eighth-round pick went to Winnipeg as the result of a trade on March 27, 1995 that sent Arto Blomsten to Los Angeles in exchange for a conditional pick in the 1995 entry draft and this pick. Conditions of the draft pick are unknown and no pick was taken.
3. Calgary's eighth-round pick went to Dallas as the result of a trade on April 7, 1995 that sent Alan May to Calgary in exchange for this pick.

=== Round nine ===
#	Player	Nationality	NHL team	College/junior/club team
209	Libor Zabransky (D)	Czech Republic	St. Louis Blues (from Ottawa)^{1}	HC Ceske Budejovice (Czech Republic)
210	David MacDonald (G)	Canada	New York Islanders	Sudbury Wolves (OHL)
211	Mike Broda (LW)	Canada	New York Islanders (from Anaheim)^{2}	Moose Jaw Warriors (WHL)
212	Zac Bierk (G)	Canada	Tampa Bay Lightning	Peterborough Petes (OHL)
213	Jiri Antonin (D)	Czech Republic	Edmonton Oilers	HC Pardubice (Czech Republic)
214	Rob DeCiantis (C)	Canada	Winnipeg Jets	Kitchener Rangers (OHL)
215	Brian Stewart (D)	Canada	Los Angeles Kings	Sault Ste. Marie Greyhounds (OHL)
216	Eric Houde (C)	Canada	Montreal Canadiens	Halifax Mooseheads (QMJHL)
217	Mike Rucinski (D)	United States	Hartford Whalers	Detroit Jr. Red Wings (OHL)
218	David Lemanowicz (G)	Canada	Florida Panthers	Spokane Chiefs (WHL)
219	Steve Lowe (C)	Canada	Dallas Stars	Sault Ste. Marie Greyhounds (OHL)
220	Mikko Markkanen (RW)	Finland	San Jose Sharks	TPS Jr. (Finland)
221	Bob Maudie (C)	Canada	New York Rangers	Kamloops Blazers (WHL)
222	Jason Cugnet (G)	Canada	Vancouver Canucks	Kelowna Spartans (BCJHL)
223	Danny Markov (D)	Russia	Toronto Maple Leafs	Spartak Moscow (Russia)
224	Rob Skrlac (LW)	Canada	Buffalo Sabres	Kamloops Blazers (WHL)
225	Scott Swanson (D)	United States	Washington Capitals	Omaha Lancers (USHL)
226	Colin O'Hara (D)	Canada	New Jersey Devils	Winnipeg Blues (MJHL)
227	Michael Pittman (C)	Canada	Chicago Blackhawks	Guelph Storm (OHL)
228	Chris George (RW)	Canada	Colorado Avalanche (from Calgary)^{3}	Sarnia Sting (OHL)
229	Jonathan Murphy (D)	Canada	Boston Bruins	Peterborough Petes (OHL)
230	Jeff Lank (D)	Canada	Philadelphia Flyers	Prince Albert Raiders (WHL)
231	Erik Kaminski (C)	United States	Ottawa Senators (from St. Louis)^{4}	Cleveland Jr. Barons (NAHL)
232	Frank Ivankovic (G)	Canada	Pittsburgh Penguins	Oshawa Generals (OHL)
233	Steve Shirreffs (D)	United States	Calgary Flames (from Colorado)^{5}	Hotchkiss School (USHS–CT)
234	David Engblom (C)	Sweden	Detroit Red Wings	Vallentuna (Sweden)

1. Ottawa's ninth-round pick went to St. Louis as the result of a trade on April 7, 1995 that sent Daniel Laperriere and a ninth-round pick in the 1995 entry draft to Ottawa in exchange for this pick.
2. Anaheim's ninth-round pick went to the Islanders as the result of a trade on August 31, 1994 that sent Darren Van Impe to Anaheim in exchange for this pick.
3. Calgary's ninth-round pick went to Colorado as the result of a trade on July 7, 1995 that sent David Ling and a ninth-round pick in the 1995 entry draft to Calgary in exchange for this pick.
4. St. Louis' ninth-round pick went to Ottawa as the result of a trade on April 7, 1995 that sent a ninth-round pick in the 1995 entry draft to St. Louis in exchange for Daniel Laperriere and this pick.
5. Colorado's ninth-round pick went to Calgary as the result of a trade on July 7, 1995 that sent a ninth-round pick in the 1995 entry draft to Calgary in exchange for David Ling and this pick.

== Draftees based on nationality ==
Rank	Country	Number	Percent
	North America	155	66.2%
1	Canada	139	59.4%
4	United States	16	6.8%
	Europe	79	33.8%
2	Russia	24	10.7%
3	Czech Republic	21	9.0%
5	Finland	13	5.6%
6	Sweden	8	3.4%
7	Slovakia	7	3.0%
8	Ukraine	2	0.9%
9	Austria	1	0.4%
9	Belarus	1	0.4%
9	Germany	1	0.4%
9	Kazakhstan	1	0.4%

== See also ==
- 1995–96 NHL season
- List of NHL players
