= Jochen Hecht =

German ice hockey player and coach

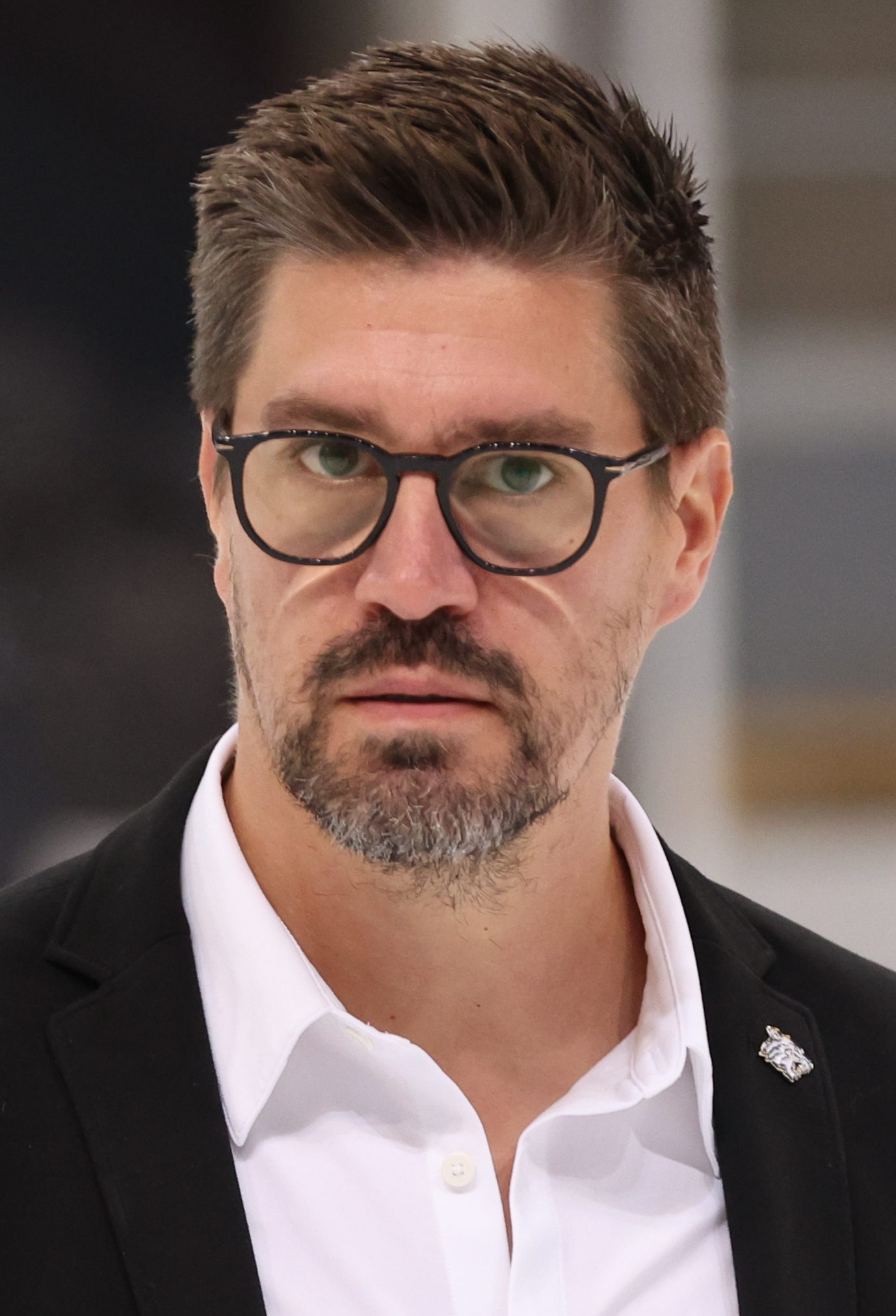
- Hecht in September 2024
- Born: 21 June 1977 (age 48) Mannheim, West Germany
- Height: 6 ft 1 in (185 cm)
- Weight: 198 lb (90 kg; 14 st 2 lb)
- Position: Left wing
- Shot: Left
- Played for: Adler Mannheim; St. Louis Blues; Edmonton Oilers; Buffalo Sabres
- National team: Germany
- NHL draft: 49th overall, 1995; St. Louis Blues
- Playing career: 1994–2016

Jochen Thomas Hecht (German: /hɛçt/) (born 21 June 1977) is a German ice hockey coach and a former professional ice hockey player. He has been serving as assistant coach for Adler Mannheim since March 2022.

Hecht played 833 games in the National Hockey League (NHL) for the St. Louis Blues, Edmonton Oilers and Buffalo Sabres and also began and finished his career with Adler Mannheim of the Deutsche Eishockey Liga (DEL).

== Playing career ==
As a youth, Hecht played in the 1990 and 1991 Quebec International Pee-Wee Hockey Tournaments with a team from Baden-Württemberg.

The St. Louis Blues selected Hecht in the second round, 49th overall, of the 1995 NHL entry draft from Adler Mannheim of the Deutsche Eishockey Liga (DEL). Hecht played two full seasons for the Blues, compiling 32 goals and 46 assists before being dealt, along with Marty Reasoner and Jan Horáček, to the Edmonton Oilers for Doug Weight and Michel Riesen on 1 July 2001.

After appearing in a full season with the Oilers, Hecht was traded to the Buffalo Sabres in exchange for the 31st and 36th picks in the 2002 NHL entry draft. As a Sabre, Hecht had his most successful NHL season, in terms of points scored, in 2006–07 with 56 points (19 goals, 37 assists).

Hecht was chosen as the captain for the month of October 2007 and later during February 2008. He is the second German-born player to captain an NHL team – Walt Tkaczuk was the first. The C was rotated monthly during the 2007–08 season. On 16 October 2007, Hecht agreed to a four-year, $14.1 million contract extension, which kept him in Buffalo until the 2011–12 season. Hecht scored his 300th career point on 26 October 2007, when he scored against Florida Panthers' goaltender Tomáš Vokoun.

Hecht returned to the city of Mannheim with the Sabres to play against Adler in an exhibition game on 4 October 2011. Hecht, who was recovering from an injury and did not play, received a standing ovation upon skating onto the ice in pre-game practice.

After being injured in January 2012 with a concussion, Hecht missed the remainder of the season and ended the year as a free agent. Several months into the 2012–13 NHL lockout, and after consulting with German doctors (who determined that some of his symptoms were neck-related), he rejoined Adler, joining Sabres linemate Jason Pominville, who joined Adler as a lockout player. After the lockout ended, he re-signed with the Sabres to a one-year, $1 million deal.

On 26 April 2013, Hecht announced his retirement from the NHL to reporters in the locker room following the Sabres' final regular season game against the New York Islanders.

Following his retirement from the NHL, Hecht announced his intention to return to Mannheim to finish out his career. In 2015, he won his third German championship with the Adler squad. The first two titles came before his NHL career, in 1997 and 1998. Hecht played a total of three additional years in Germany before retiring from professional hockey in 2016.

== International play ==
Hecht appeared in four games with Team Germany at the 2002 Winter Olympics in Salt Lake City, Utah. He scored a goal and an assist as Germany finished eighth. He had been named to the team for the 2006 Winter Olympics in Turin, Italy. He was injured, however, in his last NHL game before the Olympic break and was unable to play. He played in four World Junior Ice Hockey Championships for Team Germany between 1994 and 1997, and shares the record for most games played in World Junior Ice Hockey Championships together with Switzerland's Björn Christen.

== Coaching career ==
Hecht was named player development coach for Adler Mannheim on August 2, 2016. He served as assistant to Marco Sturm, head coach of the German men's national team, during the 2016 Deutschland-Cup. In July 2017, Hecht was promoted to the assistant coach position at Adler Mannheim and parted company with the club in May 2018 to take care of getting his coaching licenses. Hecht also worked for German TV as ice hockey pundit, on March 29, 2022, he returned to Adler Mannheim as assistant coach.

== Career statistics ==
=== Regular season and playoffs ===
			Regular season					Playoffs
Season	Team	League	GP	G	A	Pts	PIM	GP	G	A	Pts	PIM
1993–94	Mannheimer ERC	DEU U20	28	27	13	40	103	—	—	—	—	—
1994–95	Adler Mannheim	DEL	43	11	12	23	68	10	5	4	9	12
1995–96	Adler Mannheim	DEL	44	12	16	28	68	8	3	2	5	6
1996–97	Adler Mannheim	DEL	46	21	21	42	38	10	1	1	2	14
1997–98	Adler Mannheim	DEL	45	8	21	29	42	10	2	1	3	14
1998–99	Worcester IceCats	AHL	74	21	35	56	48	4	1	1	2	2
1998–99	St. Louis Blues	NHL	3	0	0	0	0	5	2	0	2	0
1999–2000	St. Louis Blues	NHL	63	13	21	34	28	7	4	6	10	0
2000–01	St. Louis Blues	NHL	72	19	25	44	48	15	2	4	6	4
2001–02	Edmonton Oilers	NHL	82	16	24	40	60	—	—	—	—	—
2002–03	Buffalo Sabres	NHL	49	10	16	26	30	—	—	—	—	—
2003–04	Buffalo Sabres	NHL	64	15	37	52	49	—	—	—	—	—
2004–05	Adler Mannheim	DEL	48	16	34	50	151	14	10	10	20	14
2005–06	Buffalo Sabres	NHL	64	18	24	42	34	15	2	6	8	8
2006–07	Buffalo Sabres	NHL	76	19	37	56	39	16	4	1	5	10
2007–08	Buffalo Sabres	NHL	75	22	27	49	38	—	—	—	—	—
2008–09	Buffalo Sabres	NHL	70	12	15	27	33	—	—	—	—	—
2009–10	Buffalo Sabres	NHL	79	21	21	42	35	—	—	—	—	—
2010–11	Buffalo Sabres	NHL	67	12	17	29	40	1	0	1	1	0
2011–12	Buffalo Sabres	NHL	22	4	4	8	6	—	—	—	—	—
2012–13	Adler Mannheim	DEL	6	5	8	13	8	—	—	—	—	—
2012–13	Buffalo Sabres	NHL	47	5	9	14	18	—	—	—	—	—
2013–14	Adler Mannheim	DEL	49	15	21	36	62	5	0	1	1	4
2014–15	Adler Mannheim	DEL	35	11	9	20	44	15	3	12	15	14
2015–16	Adler Mannheim	DEL	40	6	19	25	108	3	1	0	1	8
DEL totals			356	105	161	266	589	75	25	31	56	86
NHL totals			833	186	277	463	458	59	14	18	32	24

=== International ===
Year	Team	Event	GP	G	A	Pts	PIM
1994	Germany	WJC	7	0	0	0	4
1994	Germany	EJC	5	6	2	8	18
1995	Germany	WJC	7	5	3	8	18
1995	Germany	EJC	5	3	3	6	18
1996	Germany	WJC	6	1	4	5	18
1996	Germany	WC	6	1	2	3	8
1996	Germany	WCH	4	1	0	1	2
1997	Germany	WJC	6	0	2	2	4
1997	Germany	WC	8	2	0	2	6
1998	Germany	OG	4	1	0	1	6
1998	Germany	WC	6	1	1	2	2
2002	Germany	OG	4	1	1	2	2
2004	Germany	WC	6	3	0	3	4
2004	Germany	WCH	4	1	0	1	2
2005	Germany	WC	6	3	1	4	6
2009	Germany	WC	6	1	0	1	4
2010	Germany	OG	4	0	1	1	2
Junior totals			36	15	14	29	80
Senior totals			58	15	6	21	44

Awards and achievements
Preceded by Daniel Briere; Chris Drury	Buffalo Sabres captain October 2007	Succeeded by Toni Lydman
Preceded by Jaroslav Spacek	Buffalo Sabres captain February 2008	Succeeded by Jason Pominville
