= 1995–96 I-Divisioona season =

The 1995–96 I-Divisioona season was the 22nd season of the I-Divisioona, the second level of Finnish ice hockey. 16 teams participated in the league, and twelve qualified for the playoffs. Hermes Kokkola, SaiPa Lappeenranta and FoPS Forssa qualified for the promotion/relegation round of the SM-liiga.

== Regular season ==
| | Club | GP | W | T | L | GF–GA | Pts |
|---|---|---|---|---|---|---|---|
| 1. | Hermes Kokkola | 44 | 30 | 3 | 11 | 176:130 | 63 |
| 2. | SaiPa Lappeenranta | 44 | 28 | 4 | 12 | 188:124 | 60 |
| 3. | Kiekko-67 Turku | 44 | 29 | 2 | 13 | 163:112 | 60 |
| 4. | FoPS Forssa | 44 | 28 | 3 | 13 | 223:128 | 59 |
| 5. | Karhut | 44 | 25 | 7 | 12 | 166:123 | 57 |
| 6. | Reipas Lahti | 44 | 24 | 2 | 18 | 175:136 | 50 |
| 7. | SaPKo Savonlinna | 44 | 21 | 5 | 18 | 150:133 | 47 |
| 8. | Kärpät Oulu | 44 | 21 | 4 | 19 | 180:165 | 46 |
| 9. | PiTa Helsinki | 44 | 19 | 6 | 19 | 139:139 | 44 |
| 10. | Haukat Järvenpää | 44 | 19 | 5 | 20 | 177:178 | 43 |
| 11. | Titaanit Kotka | 44 | 19 | 5 | 20 | 152:162 | 43 |
| 12. | KooKoo Kouvola | 44 | 19 | 4 | 21 | 187:196 | 42 |
| 13. | Koo-Vee | 44 | 18 | 3 | 23 | 166:171 | 39 |
| 14. | Ketterä Imatra | 44 | 9 | 8 | 27 | 118:178 | 26 |
| 15. | Diskos Jyväskylä | 44 | 9 | 3 | 32 | 113:199 | 21 |
| 16. | Junkkarit Kalajoki | 44 | 2 | 0 | 42 | 102:301 | 4 |

== Playoffs ==
=== First round ===
1st games

- Hermes - KooKoo 6-1
- SaiPa - Titaanit 8-5
- Kiekko-67 - Haukat 2:3
- Reipas - SaPKo 5-4 OT

2nd games

- KooKoo - Hermes 5-2
- Titaanit - SaiPa 2-5
- Haukat - Kiekko-67 4:5
- SaPKo - Reipas 3-2

3rd games

- Hermes - KooKoo 6-5 OT
- Kiekko-67 - Haukat 3:2
- Reipas - SaPKo 3-5

FoPS and K-Karhut also qualified for the second round.

=== Second round ===
1st games

- Hermes - SaPKo 2:1
- SaiPa - K-Karhut 8:4
- Kiekko-67 - FoPS 2:5

2nd games

- SaPKo - Hermes 11:1
- K-Karhut - SaiPa 2:4
- FoPS - Kiekko-67 5:4

3rd games

- Hermes - SaPKo 6:1
- SaiPa - K-Karhut 6:1
- Kiekko-67 - FoPS 2:7

4th games

- SaPKo - Hermes 1-6
