= 1995 IIHF European U18 Championship =

The 1995 IIHF European U18 Championship was the twenty-eighth playing of the IIHF European Junior Championships.

== Group A ==
Played from April 10 to 16 in Berlin, Germany. Led by Jochen Hecht and Marco Sturm the hosts made history, and very nearly won the tournament. For the second time in tournament history, someone other than the Swedes, Finns, Russians, or Czechs finished in the top four. And for the first time, someone else than those four won a medal. Team Germany opened by tying the Czechs, then followed that up by actually beating the Russians. Their only loss was to tournament champion Finland, and they still had a chance for gold on the last day of the tournament.

=== First round ===
Group 1

Team	SWE	FIN	SUI	BLR	GF/Ga	Points
1. Sweden		3:2	4:3	10:3	17:8	6
2. Finland	2:3		6:1	7:2	15:6	4
3. Switzerland	3:4	1:6		4:1	8:11	2
4. Belarus	3:10	2:7	1:4		6:21	0

Group 2

Team	GER	RUS	CZE	NOR	GF/GA	Points
1. Germany		3:2	4:4	4:1	11:7	5
2. Russia	2:3		4:3	6:1	12:7	4
3. Czech Republic	4:4	3:4		16:0	23:8	3
4. Norway	1:4	1:6	0:16		2:26	0

=== Final round ===
Championship round

Team	FIN	GER	SWE	RUS	GF/GA	Points
1. Finland		5:3	(2:3)	4:2	11:8	4
2. Germany	3:5		3:3	(3:2)	9:10	3
3. Sweden	(3:2)	3:3		2:6	8:11	3
4. Russia	2:4	(2:3)	6:2		10:9	2

Placing round

Team	CZE	SUI	BLR	NOR	GF/GA	Points
1. Czech Republic		3:2	11:1	(16:0)	30:3	6
2. Switzerland	2:3		(4:1)	4:2	10:6	4
3. Belarus	1:11	(1:4)		4:4	6:19	1
4. Norway	(0:16)	2:4	4:4		6:24	1

Norway was relegated to Group B for 1996.

== Tournament Awards ==
- Top Scorer (Czech Republic) Pavel Rosa (11 points)
- Top Goalie: (Germany) Kai Fischer
- Top Defenceman: (Finland) Jaako Niskavaara
- Top Forward: (Russia) Sergei Samsonov

== Group B ==
Played from March 25 to the 31st, in Senica and Skalica, Slovakia. The hosts dominated all five of their games leaving no doubt that they belonged at the top level of European junior hockey.

=== First round ===
Group 1

Team	SVK	POL	ITA	AUT	GF/GA	Points
1. Slovakia		9:1	7:0	10:1	26:2	6
2. Poland	1:9		9:1	7:5	17:15	4
3. Italy	0:7	1:9		5:3	6:19	2
4. Austria	1:10	5:7	3:5		9:22	0

Group 2

Team	DEN	HUN	FRA	ROM	GF/GA	Points
1. Denmark		7:4	6:1	9:3	22:8	6
2. Hungary	4:7		4:4	5:1	13:12	3
3. France	1:6	4:4		3:1	8:11	3
4. Romania	3:9	1:5	1:3		5:17	0

=== Final round ===
Championship round

Team	SVK	POL	DEN	HUN	GF/GA	Points
1. Slovakia		(9:1)	13:1	19:0	41:2	6
2. Poland	(1:9)		6:3	7:3	14:15	4
3. Denmark	1:13	3:6		(7:4)	11:23	2
4. Hungary	0:19	3:7	(4:7)		7:33	0

Placing round

Team	ITA	FRA	ROM	AUT	GF/GA	Points
1. Italy		6:5	9:1	(5:3)	20:9	6
2. France	5:6		(3:1)	6:2	14:9	4
3. Romania	1:9	(1:3)		5:2	7:14	2
4. Austria	(3:5)	2:6	2:5		7:16	0

Slovakia was promoted to Group A and Austria was relegated to Group C, for 1996.

== C1 Group ==
Played from March 24 to the 30th, in Kyiv Ukraine. Ukraine, Latvia, and Slovenia finished in a tie for first, equal on head-to-head points, Ukraine and Latvia were still even on head-to-head goal differential, so overall goal differential was used to establish first place.

Team	UKR	LAT	SLO	GBR	EST	ESP	GF/GA	Points	Tie 1 H2H Points	Tie 2 H2H GD	Tie 3 Overall GD
1. Ukraine		5:2	3:4	8:3	19:2	16:1	51:12	8	2	+2	+39
2. Latvia	2:5		6:1	5:0	8:0	12:1	33:7	8	2	+2	+26
3. Slovenia	4:3	1:6		7:1	9:1	17:0	38:11	8	2	-4	
4. Great Britain	3:8	0:5	1:7		2:1	16:0	22:21	4			
5. Estonia	2:19	0:8	1:9	1:2		5:0	9:38	2			
6. Spain	1:16	1:12	0:17	0:16	0:5		2:66	0			

Ukraine was promoted to Group B. No team was relegated as the six team C1 was expanded to an eight team Group C.

== C2 Group ==
Played from March 11 to 17, in Elektrenai, Lithuania.

=== First round ===
Group 1

Team	NED	YUG	BUL	GF/GA	Points
1. Netherlands		6:4	7:2	13:6	4
2. Yugoslavia	4:6		6:3	10:9	2
3. Bulgaria	2:7	3:6		5:13	0

Group 2

Team	LTU	CRO	ISR	TUR	GF/GA	Points
1. Lithuania		4:3	14:2	39:0	57:5	6
2. Croatia	3:4		9:0	37:0	49:4	4
3. Israel	2:14	0:9		15:1	17:24	2
4. Turkey	0:39	0:37	1:15		5:91	0

=== Final round ===
Championship round

Team	LTU	CRO	NED	YUG	GF/GA	Points
1. Lithuania		(4:3)	4:2	8:3	16:8	6
2. Croatia	(3:4)		4:1	8:4	15:9	4
3. Netherlands	2:4	1:4		(6:4)	9:12	2
4. Yugoslavia	3:8	4:8	(4:6)		11:22	0

Placing round

Team	ISR	BUL	TUR	GF/GA	Points
1. Israel		5:2	(15:1)	20:3	4
2. Bulgaria	2:5		20:2	22:7	2
3. Turkey	(1:15)	2:20		3:35	0

Both Lithuania and Croatia were promoted to Group C, everyone else stayed in what would be called Group D, in 1996.
