= 1998 IIHF European U18 Championship =

Ice hockey tournament

The 1998 IIHF European U18 Championship was the thirty-first playing of the IIHF European Junior Championships.

== Group A ==
Played April 11 to the 19th in Malung and Mora, Sweden. The hosts, led by twins Daniel and Henrik Sedin, won their tenth European Junior title.

=== First round ===
Group 1

Team	RUS	FIN	CZE	NOR	GF/GA	Points
1. Russia		4:1	2:2	5:1	11:4	5
2. Finland	1:4		7:2	8:0	16:6	4
3. Czech Republic	2:2	2:7		12:1	16:10	3
4. Norway	1:5	0:8	1:12		2:25	0

Group 2

Team	SWE	SUI	SVK	UKR	GF/GA	Points
1. Sweden		6:0	5:3	13:1	24:4	6
2. Switzerland	0:6		4:1	5:1	9:8	4
3. Slovakia	3:5	1:4		5:1	9:10	2
4. Ukraine	1:13	1:5	1:5		3:23	0

=== Final round ===
The Czechs had the very unfortunate distinction of finishing tied for first, and actually finishing completely out of the medals. Coming into the final game against the Russians, the Swedes could lose or tie, and finish fourth, win by one or two goals and finish third, win by three and finish second, or win by four or more and be the champions. They led five to one after two, and played a scoreless third to clinch gold.

Championship round

Team	SWE	FIN	RUS	CZE	SUI	SVK	GF/GA	Points	Tie 1 H2H Points	Tie 2 H2H GD	Tie 3 H2H Points	Tie 4 Overall GD
1. Sweden		2:2	5:1	4:6	(6:0)	(5:3)	22:12	7	3	+2	1	+10
2. Finland	2:2		(1:4)	(7:2)	3:2	4:2	17:12	7	3	+2	1	+5
3. Russia	1:5	(4:1)		(2:2)	4:0	2:1	13:9	7	3	-1		
4. Czech Republic	6:4	(2:7)	(2:2)		7:1	5:3	21:17	7	3	-3		
5. Switzerland	(0:6)	2:3	0:4	1:7		(4:1)	7:20	2				
6. Slovakia	(3:5)	2:4	1:2	3:5	(1:4)		10:20	0				

7th place

Norway	1:2 (0:0, 0:1, 1:1)	4:3 (2:1, 2:1, 0:1)	5:2 (3:0, 2:1, 0:1)	Ukraine

- No team was relegated, all eight nations were joined by Group B winner, Germany, and the United States to participate in the first IIHF World U18 Championships.

== Tournament awards ==
- Top scorer (Sweden) Daniel Sedin (11 points)
- Top goalie: (Finland) Kristian Antila
- Top defenceman: (Finland) Mikko Jokela
- Top forward: (Sweden) Daniel Sedin

== Group B ==
Played April 5 to the 12th in Füssen and Memmingen Germany. The hosts did not dominate, but still won all their games, to return to the top level.

=== First round ===
Group 1

Team	GER	BLR	DEN	GBR	GF/GA	Points
1. Germany		4:2	4:3	5:0	13:5	6
2. Belarus	2:4		6:3	4:0	12:7	4
3. Denmark	3:4	3:6		5:1	11:11	2
4. Great Britain	0:5	0:4	1:5		1:14	0

Group 2

Team	POL	ITA	HUN	FRA	GF/GA	Points
1. Poland		4:1	5:4	2:1	11:6	6
2. Italy	1:4		4:1	3:1	8:6	4
3. Hungary	4:5	1:4		5:1	10:10	2
4. France	1:2	1:3	1:5		3:10	0

=== Final round ===
Championship round

Team	GER	ITA	POL	HUN	BLR	DEN	GF/GA	Points
1. Germany		5:2	4:0	4:1	(4:2)	(4:3)	21:8	10
2. Italy	2:5		(1:4)	(4:1)	2:0	9:1	18:11	6
3. Poland	0:4	(4:1)		(5:4)	5:8	6:6	20:23	5
4. Hungary	1:4	(1:4)	(4:5)		2:1	12:9	20:23	4
5. Belarus	(2:4)	0:2	8:5	1:2		(6:3)	17:16	4
6. Denmark	(3:4)	1:9	6:6	9:12	(3:6)		22:37	1

7th place

France	11:1 (3:0, 6:1, 2:0)	5:2 (1:0, 2:0, 2:2)	Great Britain

- Germany was promoted to Group A of the IIHF World U18 Championships. The remaining seven nations were joined by Group C winner Austria to form Group B of the IIHF World U18 Championships.

== Group C ==
Played March 16 to the 20th in Zagreb, Croatia. On final day the host Croats had to face Yugoslavia to determine who would be relegated. Because of the expansion of the top tier to ten teams, it did not matter in the end, but it was a very tense affair at the time.

=== First round ===
Group 1

Team	AUT	SLO	ROM	YUG	GF/GA	Points
1. Austria		5:3	15:3	13:1	33:7	6
2. Slovenia	3:5		9:1	10:0	22:6	4
3. Romania	3:15	1:9		6:3	10:27	2
4. Yugoslavia	1:13	0:10	3:6		4:29	0

Group 2

Team	LAT	LTU	EST	CRO	GF/GA	Points
1. Latvia		6:1	7:0	10:4	23:5	6
2. Lithuania	1:6		4:1	7:6	12:13	4
3. Estonia	0:7	1:4		4:2	5:13	2
4. Croatia	4:10	6:7	2:4		12:21	0

=== Placing round ===
7th place	Croatia	5:3 (1:1, 2:1, 2:1)	Yugoslavia
5th place	Romania	5:0 forfeit	Estonia
3rd place	Lithuania	3:2 (0:1, 2:1, 1:0)	Slovenia
Final	Austria	4:3 (0:2, 2:1, 2:0)	Latvia

- Austria was promoted to Group B of the IIHF World U18 Championships. No nation was relegated, the remaining Group C nations would take part in Division I of the 1999 U18 European Championships.

== Group D ==
Played from March 3–9 in Luxembourg. Two new entrants participated this year, the hosts, and Kazakhstan. The Kazakhs switched from playing in the Asian junior tournament, to the European. The Kazakh squad was a much better team than was suited for this level, scoring over 150 goals in five games. The Dutch were the only ones to lose by less than fifteen to the Kazakhs. Leading the team, a young Nik Antropov collected 54 points.

=== First round ===
Group 1

Team	NED	BEL	BUL	ISR	GF/GA	Points
1. Netherlands		7:3	12:0	12:0	31:3	6
2. Belgium	3:7		12:1	8:0	23:8	4
3. Bulgaria	0:12	1:12		3:2	4:26	2
4. Israel	0:12	0:8	2:3		2:23	0

Group 2

Team	KAZ	ESP	ISL	LUX	GF/GA	Points
1. Kazakhstan		19:2	63:0	39:0	121:2	6
2. Spain	2:19		4:1	17:2	23:22	4
3. Iceland	0:63	1:4		4:2	5:69	2
4. Luxembourg	0:39	2:17	2:4		4:60	0

=== Final round ===
Championship round

Team	KAZ	NED	BEL	ESP	GF/GA	Points
1. Kazakhstan		14:1	20:1	(19:2)	53:4	6
2. Netherlands	1:14		(7:3)	4:1	12:18	4
3. Belgium	1:20	(3:7)		5:3	9:30	2
4. Spain	(2:19)	1:4	3:5		6:28	0

Placing round

Team	BUL	ISR	ISL	LUX	GF/GA	Points
1. Bulgaria		(3:2)	9:2	5:2	17:6	6
2. Israel	(2:3)		4:4	4:1	10:8	3
3. Iceland	2:9	4:4		(4:2)	10:15	3
4. Luxembourg	2:5	1:4	(2:4)		5:13	0

- Kazakhstan was promoted to the newly titled Division I of the 1999 U18 European Championships.
