= 2003 IIHF World U18 Championship Division I =

International ice hockey competition

Tournament details
- Host countries: Latvia; France
- Dates: 22–28 March 2003; 23–29 March 2003
- Teams: 12

The 2003 IIHF World U18 Championship Division I was a pair of international under-18 ice hockey tournaments run by the International Ice Hockey Federation. The Division I tournaments made up the second level of competition at the 2003 IIHF World U18 Championships. The Group A tournament took place between 23 and 29 March 2003 in Ventspils, Latvia and the Group B tournament took place between 22 and 28 March 2003 in Briançon, France. Denmark and Norway won the Group A and Group B tournaments respectively and gained promotion to the Championship Division for the 2004 IIHF World U18 Championships. While Great Britain finished last in Group A and Ukraine last in Group B and were both relegated to Division II for 2004.

== Group A tournament ==
The Group A tournament began on 23 March 2003 in Ventspils, Latvia. Denmark, Japan, Latvia and Slovenia all returned to compete in this year's Division I tournament after missing promotion to the Championship Division at the previous years World Championship. Great Britain gained promotion to Division I after finishing third in last years Division II tournament and Germany was relegated from the Championship Division after failing to survive the relegation round at the 2002 IIHF World U18 Championships. Denmark won the tournament after finishing first in the group standings and gained promotion to the Championship Division for the 2004 IIHF World U18 Championships. Germany finished second losing only to Denmark and Slovenia finished in third place. Great Britain finished in last place after losing all five of their games and were relegated back to Division II for the 2004 IIHF World U18 Championships. Martin Nielsen of Denmark finished as the top scorer of the tournament with eleven points including four goals and seven assists. Japan's Kaku Asari finished the tournament as the leading goaltender based on save percentage.

=== Standings ===
Pos	Team	Pld	W	D	L	GF	GA	GD	Pts	Promotion or relegation
1	Denmark	5	4	1	0	31	12	+19	9	Promoted to the Championship Division for 2004
2	Germany	5	4	0	1	34	8	+26	8	
3	Slovenia	5	3	0	2	24	27	−3	6	
4	Latvia	5	1	2	2	14	15	−1	4	
5	Japan	5	1	1	3	15	19	−4	3	
6	Great Britain	5	0	0	5	8	45	−37	0	Relegated to Division II for 2004

Source: IIHF

=== Fixtures ===
All times local.

23 March 2003; 13:00	Denmark	10 – 4 (6–2, 3–1, 1–1)	Slovenia	Ventspils; Attendance: 300

Game reference

23 March 2003; 16:30	Latvia	1 – 1 (0–1, 0–0, 1–0)	Japan	Ventspils; Attendance: 1000

Game reference

23 March 2003; 20:00	Great Britain	0 – 13 (0–3, 0–5, 0–5)	Germany	Ventspils; Attendance: 300

Game reference

24 March 2003; 13:00	Slovenia	7 – 2 (1–1, 5–0, 1–1)	Japan	Ventspils; Attendance: 300

Game reference

24 March 2003; 16:30	Germany	3 – 4 (2–1, 1–2, 0–1)	Denmark	Ventspils; Attendance: 300

Game reference

24 March 2003; 20:00	Latvia	6 – 2 (1–0, 3–0, 2–2)	Great Britain	Ventspils; Attendance: 910

Game reference

26 March 2003; 13:00	Great Britain	2 – 11 (1–3, 0–4, 1–4)	Denmark	Ventspils; Attendance: 300

Game reference

26 March 2003; 16:30	Germany	4 – 1 (2–1, 2–0, 0–0)	Japan	Ventspils; Attendance: 300

Game reference

26 March 2003; 20:00	Slovenia	6 – 4 (0–1, 2–2, 4–1)	Latvia	Ventspils; Attendance: 1000

Game reference

27 March 2003; 13:00	Denmark	4 – 1 (2–0, 2–1, 0–0)	Japan	Ventspils; Attendance: 398

Game reference

27 March 2003; 16:30	Slovenia	5 – 1 (0–0, 3–1, 2–0)	Great Britain	Ventspils; Attendance: 300

Game reference

27 March 2003; 20:00	Latvia	1 – 4 (0–1, 1–0, 0–3)	Germany	Ventspils; Attendance: 1000

Game reference

29 March 2003; 11:00	Japan	10 – 3 (5–0, 1–2, 4–1)	Great Britain	Ventspils; Attendance: 300

Game reference

29 March 2003; 14:30	Germany	10 – 2 (3–0, 4–1, 3–1)	Slovenia	Ventspils; Attendance: 300

Game reference

29 March 2003; 18:00	Latvia	2 – 2 (1–1, 1–1, 0–0)	Denmark	Ventspils; Attendance: 1000

Game reference

=== Scoring leaders ===
List shows the top ten skaters sorted by points, then goals.

Player	GP	G	A	Pts	+/-	PIM	POS
(Denmark) Martin Nielsen	5	4	7	11	+6	4	F
(Germany) Kai Hospelt	5	7	3	10	+4	4	F
(Denmark) Nicolaj Nedermark	5	4	5	9	+4	4	F
(Germany) Marcus Kink	5	5	3	8	+8	6	F
(Germany) Uli Maurer	5	3	5	8	+7	22	F
(Germany) Fabio Carciola	5	4	3	7	+5	2	F
(Denmark) Jannik Hansen	5	2	5	7	+6	14	F
(Slovenia) Rok Pajic	5	3	3	6	+3	14	F
(Denmark) Jakob Petersen Vorup	5	2	4	6	+4	0	F
(Slovenia) Ziga Svete	5	1	5	6	+1	10	D

=== Leading goaltenders ===
Only the top five goaltenders, based on save percentage, who have played 40% of their team's minutes are included in this list.

Player	MIP	SOG	GA	GAA	SVS%	SO
(Japan) Kaku Asari	180:00	131	9	3.00	93.13	0
(Denmark) Sebastian Dahm	180:00	80	8	2.67	90.00	0
(Latvia) Mārtiņš Raitums	300:00	150	15	3.00	90.00	0
(Germany) Danny aus den Birken	180:00	54	6	2.00	88.89	1
(United Kingdom) David Lawrence	175:12	177	24	8.22	86.44	0

== Group B tournament ==
The Group B tournament began on 22 March 2003 in Briançon, France. Austria and Italy both returned to compete in this year's Division I tournament after missing promotion to the Championship Division at the previous years World Championship. France and Poland gained promotion to Division I after finishing first and second respectively in last years Division II tournament and Norway and Ukraine were relegated from the Championship Division after failing to survive the relegation round at the 2002 IIHF World U18 Championships. Norway won the tournament after finishing first in the group standings and gained promotion to the Championship Division for the 2004 IIHF World U18 Championships. Poland finished second after winning three of their games and drawing the fourth and Italy finished in third place. Ukraine finished in last place after finishing last in the group standings and were relegated to Division II for the 2004 IIHF World U18 Championships. Marcin Kolusz of Poland finished as the top scorer of the tournament with seven points including four goals and three assists. Poland's Bartosz Stepokura finished the tournament as the leading goaltender based on save percentage.

=== Standings ===
Pos	Team	Pld	W	D	L	GF	GA	GD	Pts	Promotion or relegation
1	Norway	5	4	1	0	22	13	+9	9	Promoted to the Championship Division for 2004
2	Poland	5	3	1	1	11	14	−3	7	
3	Italy	5	2	1	2	15	13	+2	5	
4	France	5	2	0	3	20	17	+3	4	
5	Austria	5	1	1	3	15	18	−3	3	
6	Ukraine	5	1	0	4	16	24	−8	2	Relegated to Division II for 2004

Source: IIHF

=== Fixtures ===
All times local.

22 March 2003; 13:00	Poland	2 – 2 (1–1, 1–0, 0–1)	Norway	Briançon; Attendance: 407

Game reference

22 March 2003; 16:30	Italy	4 – 0 (1–0, 0–0, 3–0)	Ukraine	Briançon; Attendance: 462

Game reference

22 March 2003; 20:00	France	6 – 4 (1–3, 3–1, 2–0)	Austria	Briançon; Attendance: 1743

Game reference

22 March 2003; 13:00	Norway	5 – 2 (0–0, 3–1, 2–1)	Italy	Briançon; Attendance: 434

Game reference

23 March 2003; 16:30	Austria	1 – 2 (0–1, 0–1, 1–0)	Poland	Briançon; Attendance: 326

Game reference

23 March 2003; 20:00	Ukraine	1 – 7 (1–1, 0–4, 0–2)	France	Briançon; Attendance: 1372

Game reference

25 March 2003; 13:00	Poland	4 – 3 (2–2, 1–0, 1–1)	Italy	Briançon; Attendance: 889

Game reference

25 March 2003; 16:30	Ukraine	5 – 6 (0–1, 2–3, 3–2)	Austria	Briançon; Attendance: 756

Game reference

25 March 2003; 20:00	Norway	4 – 2 (2–1, 1–1, 1–0)	France	Briançon; Attendance: 1707

Game reference

26 March 2003; 13:00	Ukraine	6 – 0 (1–0, 5–0, 0–0)	Poland	Briançon; Attendance: 417

Game reference

26 March 2003; 16:30	Austria	3 – 4 (1–1, 1–1, 1–2)	Norway	Briançon; Attendance: 512

Game reference

26 March 2003; 20:00	Italy	5 – 3 (1–0, 2–0, 2–3)	France	Briançon; Attendance: 1728

Game reference

28 March 2003; 13:00	Austria	1 – 1 (0–0, 1–0, 0–1)	Italy	Briançon; Attendance: 545

Game reference

28 March 2003; 16:30	Norway	7 – 4 (3–1, 3–3, 1–0)	Ukraine	Briançon; Attendance: 548

Game reference

28 March 2003; 20:00	France	2 – 3 (1–0, 0–0, 1–3)	Poland	Briançon; Attendance: 2003

Game reference

=== Scoring leaders ===
List shows the top ten skaters sorted by points, then goals.

Player	GP	G	A	Pts	+/-	PIM	POS
(Poland) Marcin Kolusz	5	4	3	7	+2	0	F
(Austria) Rafael Rotter	5	3	4	7	+4	2	F
(Ukraine) Vitaliy Kyrychenko	5	3	3	6	–2	4	F
(Norway) Mathias Trygg	5	3	2	5	+2	0	F
(France) Lionel Wiotte	5	3	2	5	+1	0	F
(Norway) Lars Erik Hesbråten	5	3	2	5	+1	2	F
(Poland) Sebastian Kowalowka	5	3	2	5	+2	4	F
(Norway) Mathis Olimb	5	3	2	5	+1	4	F
(Italy) Claudio Mantese	5	3	2	5	+2	6	F
(Norway) Martin Røymark	5	2	3	5	+1	0	F

=== Leading goaltenders ===
Only the top five goaltenders, based on save percentage, who have played 40% of their team's minutes are included in this list.

Player	MIP	SOG	GA	GAA	SVS%	SO
(Poland) Bartosz Stepokura	267:02	153	11	2.47	92.81	0
(Italy) Renè Baur	280:00	139	11	2.36	92.09	1
(Norway) Mathias Gundersen	240:00	95	11	2.75	88.42	0
(Austria) Mathias Lange	240:00	120	14	3.50	88.33	0
(Ukraine) Sergiy Gavrylyuk	122:35	69	9	4.41	86.96	0
