= 2012 IIHF World U18 Championship Division I =

2012 IIHF U18 World Championship Division I

Tournament details
- Host countries: Slovakia; Hungary
- Venue(s): 2 (in 2 host cities)
- Dates: 11–17 April 2012
- Teams: 12

The 2012 IIHF U18 World Championship Division I was two international under-18 ice hockey tournaments organised by the International Ice Hockey Federation. In 2012, a new format was introduced to the IIHF World U18 Championships, therefore Division I A and Division I B now represent the second and the third tier of the IIHF World U18 Championships.

== Division I A ==
The Division I A tournament was played in Piešťany, Slovakia, from 11 to 17 April 2012.

=== Participants ===
Team	Qualification
Norway	Placed 9th in 2011 Top Division and were relegated
Slovakia	Hosts, placed 10th in 2011 Top Division and were relegated
Italy	Placed 2nd in 2011 Division I (Group A)
Slovenia	Placed 2nd in 2011 Division I (Group B)
Japan	Not participated in 2011; placed 3rd in 2010 Division I (Group A)
France	Placed 3rd in 2011 Division I (Group B)

=== Final standings ===
Pos	Team	Pld	W	OTW	OTL	L	GF	GA	GD	Pts	Promotion or relegation
1	Slovakia	5	5	0	0	0	30	6	+24	15	Promoted to the 2013 Top Division
2	Norway	5	3	0	0	2	22	20	+2	9	
3	Italy	5	1	1	2	1	17	20	−3	7	
4	France	5	1	1	0	3	12	19	−7	5	
5	Slovenia	5	1	1	0	3	12	21	−9	5	
6	Japan	5	1	0	1	3	14	21	−7	4	Relegated to the 2013 Division I B

Source: IIHF

=== Results ===
All times are local. (Central European Summer Time – UTC+2)

11 April 2012; 12:00	Japan	2–3 (0–0, 0–1, 2–2)	Slovenia	Zimný štadión Piešťany, Piešťany

Game reference

11 April 2012; 15:30	France	1–6 (0–3, 0–2, 1–1)	Norway	Zimný štadión Piešťany, Piešťany

Game reference

11 April 2012; 19:00	Italy	0–5 (0–1, 0–1, 0–3)	Slovakia	Zimný štadión Piešťany, Piešťany

Game reference

12 April 2012; 12:00	Slovenia	2–4 (2–2, 0–2, 0–0)	France	Zimný štadión Piešťany, Piešťany

Game reference

12 April 2012; 15:30	Norway	3–6 (1–1, 1–1, 1–4)	Italy	Zimný štadión Piešťany, Piešťany

Game reference

12 April 2012; 19:00	Slovakia	4–1 (0–0, 3–1, 1–0)	Japan	Zimný štadión Piešťany, Piešťany

Game reference

14 April 2012; 12:00	France	4–3 GWS (1–1, 0–2, 2–0) (0–0, 1–0)	Italy	Zimný štadión Piešťany, Piešťany

Game reference

14 April 2012; 15:30	Norway	7–3 (5–0, 0–1, 2–2)	Japan	Zimný štadión Piešťany, Piešťany

Game reference

14 April 2012; 19:00	Slovakia	8–2 (1–1, 2–1, 5–0)	Slovenia	Zimný štadión Piešťany, Piešťany

Game reference

15 April 2012; 12:00	Italy	5–4 OT (1–2, 2–0, 1–2) (1–0)	Japan	Zimný štadión Piešťany, Piešťany

Game reference

15 April 2012; 15:30	Slovenia	1–4 (1–1, 0–1, 0–2)	Norway	Zimný štadión Piešťany, Piešťany

Game reference

15 April 2012; 19:00	Slovakia	4–1 (1–1, 1–0, 2–0)	France	Zimný štadión Piešťany, Piešťany

Game reference

17 April 2012; 11:30	Japan	4–2 (1–1, 2–0, 1–1)	France	Zimný štadión Piešťany, Piešťany

Game reference

17 April 2012; 14:45	Slovenia	4–3 GWS (0–2, 0–1, 3–0) (0–0, 1–0)	Italy	Zimný štadión Piešťany, Piešťany

Game reference

17 April 2012; 18:15	Norway	2–9 (1–3, 1–2, 0–4)	Slovakia	Zimný štadión Piešťany, Piešťany

Game reference

== Division I B ==
The Division I B tournament was played in Székesfehérvár, Hungary, from 11 to 17 April 2012.

=== Participants ===
Team	Qualification
Kazakhstan	Placed 3rd in 2011 Division I (Group A)
Belarus	Placed 4th in 2011 Division I (Group B)
Hungary	Hosts, placed 4th in 2011 Division I (Group A)
Poland	Placed 5th in 2011 Division I (Group B)
Austria	Placed 1st in 2011 Division II (Group A) and were promoted
Ukraine	Placed 1st in 2011 Division II (Group B) and were promoted

=== Final standings ===
Pos	Team	Pld	W	OTW	OTL	L	GF	GA	GD	Pts	Promotion or relegation
1	Belarus	5	5	0	0	0	28	9	+19	15	Promoted to the 2013 Division I A
2	Kazakhstan	5	3	1	0	1	27	16	+11	11	
3	Austria	5	2	1	0	2	21	21	0	8	
4	Ukraine	5	1	1	1	2	20	26	−6	6	
5	Poland	5	0	1	1	3	13	30	−17	3	
6	Hungary	5	0	0	2	3	13	20	−7	2	Relegated to the 2013 Division II A

Source: IIHF

=== Results ===
All times are local. (Central European Summer Time – UTC+2)

11 April 2012; 12:30	Poland	0–7 (0–2, 0–4, 0–1)	Belarus	Ifjabb Ocskay Gábor Ice Hall, Székesfehérvár

Game reference

11 April 2012; 16:00	Ukraine	4–5 OT (1–0, 1–3, 2–1) (0–1)	Kazakhstan	Ifjabb Ocskay Gábor Ice Hall, Székesfehérvár

Game reference

11 April 2012; 19:30	Austria	5–4 GWS (1–1, 1–2, 2–1) (0–0, 1–0)	Hungary	Ifjabb Ocskay Gábor Ice Hall, Székesfehérvár

Game reference

12 April 2012; 12:30	Kazakhstan	7–1 (4–1, 0–0, 3–0)	Poland	Ifjabb Ocskay Gábor Ice Hall, Székesfehérvár

Game reference

12 April 2012; 16:00	Belarus	5–1 (2–0, 3–0, 0–1)	Austria	Ifjabb Ocskay Gábor Ice Hall, Székesfehérvár

Game reference

12 April 2012; 19:30	Hungary	3–5 (0–2, 1–2, 2–1)	Ukraine	Ifjabb Ocskay Gábor Ice Hall, Székesfehérvár

Game reference

14 April 2012; 12:30	Kazakhstan	7–4 (2–0, 3–0, 2–4)	Austria	Ifjabb Ocskay Gábor Ice Hall, Székesfehérvár

Game reference

14 April 2012; 16:00	Ukraine	7–6 GWS (3–2, 2–2, 1–2) (0–0, 1–0)	Poland	Ifjabb Ocskay Gábor Ice Hall, Székesfehérvár

Game reference

14 April 2012; 19:30	Belarus	3–2 (0–0, 0–2, 3–0)	Hungary	Ifjabb Ocskay Gábor Ice Hall, Székesfehérvár

Game reference

15 April 2012; 12:30	Poland	2–6 (0–0, 2–1, 0–5)	Austria	Ifjabb Ocskay Gábor Ice Hall, Székesfehérvár

Game reference

15 April 2012; 16:00	Belarus	7–1 (0–0, 2–0, 5–1)	Ukraine	Ifjabb Ocskay Gábor Ice Hall, Székesfehérvár

Game reference

15 April 2012; 19:30	Hungary	1–3 (0–1, 0–1, 1–1)	Kazakhstan	Ifjabb Ocskay Gábor Ice Hall, Székesfehérvár

Game reference

17 April 2012; 12:30	Austria	5–3 (0–1, 0–1, 5–1)	Ukraine	Ifjabb Ocskay Gábor Ice Hall, Székesfehérvár

Game reference

17 April 2012; 16:00	Kazakhstan	5–6 (4–3, 0–3, 1–0)	Belarus	Ifjabb Ocskay Gábor Ice Hall, Székesfehérvár

Game reference

17 April 2012; 19:30	Hungary	3–4 GWS (1–2, 1–1, 1–0) (0–0, 0–1)	Poland	Ifjabb Ocskay Gábor Ice Hall, Székesfehérvár

Game reference
