= 1999 IIHF World U18 Championships =

1999 IIHF World U18 Championship
Tournament details
- Host country: Germany
- Venue(s): 2 (in 2 host cities)
- Dates: April 8 to 18, 1999
- Teams: 10

Final positions
- Champions: Finland

Tournament statistics
- Scoring leader(s): (Sweden) Mikael Berg (10 points)

The 1999 IIHF World U18 Championships was the first of its kind. It was held between April 8 and 18, 1999, in Füssen and Kaufbeuren, Germany. It replaced the European Under 18 Championship at the top two levels (which had run since 1977), by including one nation, the United States. Below the top two levels (Divisions A & B) two tiers of European divisions played, as well as two tiers of Asian divisions.

== Division A ==
=== First round ===
Group A
Pos	Team	Pld	W	D	L	GF	GA	Pts	SWE	SUI	CZE	UKR	GER
1	Sweden	4	3	1	0	22	8	7		3–0	4–4	10–2	5–2
2	Switzerland	4	3	0	1	10	6	6	0–3		3–2	4–1	3–0
3	Czech Republic	4	2	1	1	16	10	5	4–4	2–3		4–2	6–1
4	Ukraine	4	1	0	3	8	20	2	2–10	1–4	1–6		4–0
5	Germany	4	0	0	4	4	16	0	2–5	0–3	2–4	0–4	

Group B
Pos	Team	Pld	W	D	L	GF	GA	Pts	FIN	SVK	RUS	USA	NOR
1	Finland	4	4	0	0	21	5	8		3–2	3–1	5–0	10–2
2	Slovakia	4	3	0	1	18	10	6	2–3		3–2	6–5	7–0
3	Russia	4	2	0	2	13	9	4	1–3	2–3		2–1	8–2
4	United States	4	1	0	3	16	15	2	0–5	5–6	1–2		10–2
5	Norway	4	0	0	4	6	35	0	2–10	0–7	2–8	2–10	

=== 7-10 place ===
Pos	Team	Pld	W	D	L	GF	GA	Pts	USA	UKR	GER	NOR
1	United States	3	3	0	0	22	2	6		6–0	6–0	(10–2)
2	Ukraine	3	2	0	1	7	6	4	0–6		(4–0)	3–0
3	Germany	3	1	0	2	4	12	2	0–6	(0–4)		4–2
4	Norway	3	0	0	3	4	17	0	(2–10)	0–3	2–4	

=== 1-6 place ===
Pos	Team	Pld	W	D	L	GF	GA	Pts	FIN	SWE	SVK	SUI	CZE	RUS
1	Finland	5	3	1	1	12	12	7		2–2	(3–2)	1–6	3–1	(3–1)
2	Sweden	5	2	2	1	15	10	6	2–2		4–1	(3–0)	(4–4)	2–3
3	Slovakia	5	3	0	2	13	12	6	(2–3)	1–4		6–3	1–0	(3–2)
4	Switzerland	5	3	0	2	16	13	6	6–1	(0–3)	3–6		(3–2)	4–1
5	Czech Republic	5	1	1	3	12	13	3	1–3	(4–4)	0–1	(2–3)		5–2
6	Russia	5	1	0	4	9	17	2	(1–3)	3–2	(2–3)	1–4	2–5	

=== Final standings ===
1. Finland
2. Sweden
3. Slovakia
4. Switzerland
5. Czech Republic
6. Russia
7. United States
8. Ukraine
9. Germany
10. Norway

Norway was relegated to Division B for 2000.

== Division B ==
Group A
Pos	Team	Pld	W	D	L	GF	GA	Pts	BLR	DAN	ITA	GBR
1	Belarus	3	3	0	0	23	6	6		10–4	5–1	8–1
2	Denmark	3	1	1	1	16	16	3	4–10		4–4	8–2
3	Italy	3	1	1	1	11	11	3	1–5	4–4		6–2
4	Great Britain	3	0	0	3	5	22	0	1–8	2–6	2–8	

Group B
Pos	Team	Pld	W	D	L	GF	GA	Pts	AUT	POL	FRA	HUN
1	Austria	3	2	1	0	23	5	5		6–0	3–3	14–2
2	Poland	3	2	0	1	13	11	4	0–6		5–3	8–2
3	France	3	1	1	1	15	10	3	3–3	3–5		9–2
4	Hungary	3	0	0	3	6	31	0	2–14	2–8	2–9	

=== Final round ===
5th-8th place
Pos	Team	Pld	W	D	L	GF	GA	Pts	ITA	FRA	HUN	GBR
1	Italy	3	3	0	0	17	4	6		4–1	7–1	(6–2)
2	France	3	2	0	1	15	7	4	1–4		(9–2)	5–1
3	Hungary	3	1	0	2	7	19	2	1–7	(2–9)		4–3
4	Great Britain	3	0	0	3	6	15	0	(2–6)	1–5	3–4	

Final round
Pos	Team	Pld	W	D	L	GF	GA	Pts	BLR	AUT	POL	DAN
1	Belarus	3	1	2	0	15	9	4		2–2	3–3	(10–4)
2	Austria	3	1	1	1	11	7	3	2–2		(6–0)	3–5
3	Poland	3	1	1	1	6	11	3	3–3	(0–6)		3–2
4	Denmark	3	1	0	2	11	16	2	(4–10)	5–3	2–3	

==== Final ranking ====
RF	Team
1	Belarus
2	Austria
3	Poland
4	Denmark
5	Italy
6	France
7	Hungary
8	Great Britain

Belarus was promoted to Division A, and both Hungary and Great Britain were relegated to the European Division I, for 2000.

== European Championships Division I ==
=== First round ===
Group A
Pos	Team	GF	GA	Pts	LAT	EST	ROM	YUG
1	Latvia	41	5	6–0		6–2	11–2	24–1
2	Estonia	21	8	4–2	2–6		9–1	10–1
3	Romania	11	23	2–4	2–11	1–9		8–3
4	Yugoslavia	5	42	0–6	1–24	1–10	3–8	

Group B
Pos	Team	GF	GA	Pts	SLO	LTU	KAZ	CRO
1	Slovenia	22	9	6–0		6–4	6–2	10–3
2	Lithuania	13	9	4–2	4–6		5–0	4–3
3	Kazakhstan	12	13	2–4	2–6	0–5		10–2
4	Croatia	8	24	0–6	3–10	3–4	2–10	

=== Placing round ===
7th place
20 January 1999	Bucharest	Croatia	–	Yugoslavia	14–2 (3–2,4–0,7–0)
5th place
20 January 1999	Bucharest	Romania	–	Kazakhstan	0–15 (0–4,0–7,0–4)
3rd place
20 January 1999	Bucharest	Lithuania	–	Estonia	10–1 (2–1,5–0,3–0)
Final
20 January 1999	Bucharest	Latvia	–	Slovenia	5–1 (2–0,2–1,1–0)

Latvia was promoted to Division B, and both Croatia and Yugoslavia were relegated to the European Division II, for 2000.

== European Championships Division II ==
=== First round ===
Group A
Pos	Team	GF	GA	Pts	NED	ISR	BUL	IRL
1	Netherlands	64	2	6–0		10–2	12–0	42–0
2	Israel	29	14	4–2	2–10		8–3	19–1
3	Bulgaria	12	22	2–4	0–12	3–8		9–2
4	Ireland	3	70	0–6	0–42	1–19	2–9	

Group B
Pos	Team	GF	GA	Pts	ESP	BEL	LUX	ISL
1	Spain	23	4	6–0		5–2	8–1	10–1
2	Belgium	20	6	4–2	2–5		8–1	10–0
3	Luxembourg	4	16	2–4	1–8	1–8		2–0
4	Iceland	1	22	0–6	1–10	0–10	0–2	

=== Placing round ===
5th-8th place
Pos	Team	GF	GA	Pts	LUX	BUL	ISL	IRL
1	Luxembourg	17	5	4–2		4–5	(2–0)	11–0
2	Bulgaria	19	12	4–2	5–4		5–6	(9–2)
3	Iceland	20	7	4–2	(0–2)	6–5		14–0
4	Ireland	2	34	0–6	0–11	(2–9)	0–14	

1st-4th place
Pos	Team	GF	GA	Pts	ESP	NED	BEL	ISR
1	Spain	19	7	5–1		3–3	(5–2)	11–2
2	Netherlands	14	6	4–2	3–3		1–1	(10–2)
3	Belgium	17	7	3–3	(2–5)	1–1		14–1
4	Israel	5	35	0–6	2–11	(2–10)	1–14	

Spain was promoted to the European Division I for 2000.

== Asia-Oceania Division I ==
Pos	Team	GF	GA	Pts	JPN	KOR	CHN	AUS
1	Japan	36	5	6–0		8–4	13–1	15–0
2	South Korea	24	11	4–2	4–8		6–3	14–0
3	China	15	19	2–4	1–13	3–6		11–0
4	Australia	0	40	0–6	0–15	0–14	0–11	

Japan was promoted to Division B for 2000.

== Asia-Oceania Division II ==
=== First round ===
Pos	Team	GF	GA	Pts	PRK	RSA	NZL	TPE
1	North Korea	56	3	6–0		9–3	23–0	24–0
2	South Africa	38	10	4–2	3–9		1–0	34–1
3	New Zealand	20	27	2–4	0–23	0–1		20–3
4	Chinese Taipei	4	78	0–6	0–24	1–34	3–20	

=== Semi-finals ===
- North Korea 29 - 0 Chinese Taipei
- South Africa 15 - 0 New Zealand

=== Finals ===
- 3rd place: New Zealand 26 - 4 Chinese Taipei
- 1st place: North Korea 9 - 1 South Africa

North Korea was promoted to Asia-Oceania Division I for 2000.

== All-Star Team ==
Source: EliteProspects

- Ari Ahonen (Goaltender)
- David Jobin (Defence)
- Niklas Kronwall (Defence)
- Mikko Hyytiä (Centre)
- Marián Gáborík (Winger)
- Milan Bartovič (Winger)

Preceded by –	IIHF World U18 Championships; 1999	Succeeded by 2000 World U18
