= 2013 IIHF World U18 Championship Division I =

2013 IIHF U18 World Championship Division I

Tournament details
- Host countries: Italy; Poland
- Venues: 2 (in 2 host cities)
- Dates: 7–13 April 2013; 14–20 April 2013
- Teams: 12

The 2013 IIHF U18 World Championship Division I was two international under-18 ice hockey tournaments organised by the International Ice Hockey Federation. The Division I A and Division I B tournaments represent the second and the third tier of the IIHF World U18 Championships.

== Division I A ==
The Division I A tournament was played in Asiago, Italy, from 7 to 13 April 2013. Danish goalie George Sørensen scored a goal against France, joining Anton Khudobin as the only goaltenders ever to accomplish this feat in an IIHF event.

=== Participants ===
Team	Qualification
Denmark	placed 10th in 2012 Top Division and were relegated
Norway	placed 2nd in 2012 Division I A
Italy	hosts, placed 3rd in 2012 Division I A
France	placed 4th in 2012 Division I A
Slovenia	placed 5th in 2012 Division I A
Belarus	placed 1st in 2012 Division I B and were promoted

=== Final standings ===
Pos	Team	Pld	W	OTW	OTL	L	GF	GA	GD	Pts	Promotion or relegation
1	Denmark	5	4	1	0	0	22	6	+16	14	Promoted to the 2014 Top Division
2	Norway	5	4	0	0	1	31	15	+16	12	
3	Italy	5	2	0	1	2	11	24	−13	7	
4	Belarus	5	2	0	1	2	17	15	+2	7	
5	France	5	1	1	0	3	14	19	−5	5	
6	Slovenia	5	0	0	0	5	8	24	−16	0	Relegated to the 2014 Division I B

Source: IIHF

=== Results ===
All times are local. (Central European Summer Time – UTC+2)

7 April 2013; 13:15	France	2–3 (2–0, 0–0, 0–3)	Norway	PalaOdegar, Asiago

Game reference

7 April 2013; 16:45	Belarus	2–3 GWS (0–1, 1–0, 1–1) (OT: 0–0) (SO: 0–1)	Denmark	PalaOdegar, Asiago

Game reference

7 April 2013; 20:30	Slovenia	2–3 (1–0, 1–1, 0–2)	Italy	PalaOdegar, Asiago

Game reference

8 April 2013; 13:15	Denmark	5–1 (1–0, 0–0, 4–1)	France	PalaOdegar, Asiago

Game reference

8 April 2013; 16:45	Norway	7–3 (1–1, 2–1, 4–1)	Slovenia	PalaOdegar, Asiago

Game reference

8 April 2013; 20:30	Italy	4–1 (2–0, 1–0, 1–1)	Belarus	PalaOdegar, Asiago

Game reference

10 April 2013; 13:15	Denmark	3–0 (1–0, 2–0, 0–0)	Slovenia	PalaOdegar, Asiago

Game reference

10 April 2013; 16:45	Belarus	6–1 (3–0, 2–1, 1–0)	France	PalaOdegar, Asiago

Game reference

11 April 2013; 20:30	Norway	12–1 (4–0, 4–1, 4–0)	Italy	PalaOdegar, Asiago

Game reference

11 April 2013; 13:15	Norway	6–3 (2–2, 3–0, 1–1)	Belarus	PalaOdegar, Asiago

Game reference

11 April 2013; 16:45	France	6–2 (2–2, 2–2, 2–0)	Slovenia	PalaOdegar, Asiago

Game reference

11 April 2013; 20:30	Italy	0–5 (0–0, 0–4, 0–1)	Denmark	PalaOdegar, Asiago

Game reference

13 April 2013; 13:15	Slovenia	1–5 (0–0, 0–2, 1–3)	Belarus	PalaOdegar, Asiago

Game reference

13 April 2013; 16:45	Denmark	6–3 (2–1, 0–2, 4–0)	Norway	PalaOdegar, Asiago

Game reference

13 April 2013; 20:30	Italy	3–4 GWS (0–2, 1–1, 2–0) (OT: 0–0) (SO: 0–2)	France	PalaOdegar, Asiago

Game reference

== Division I B ==
The Division I B tournament was played in Tychy, Poland, from 14 to 20 April 2013.

=== Participants ===
Team	Qualification
Japan	placed 6th in 2012 Division I A and were relegated
Kazakhstan	placed 2nd in 2012 Division I B
Austria	placed 3rd in 2012 Division I B
Ukraine	placed 4th in 2012 Division I B
Poland	hosts, placed 5th in 2012 Division I B
South Korea	placed 1st in 2012 Division II A and were promoted

=== Final standings ===
Pos	Team	Pld	W	OTW	OTL	L	GF	GA	GD	Pts	Promotion or relegation
1	Kazakhstan	5	5	0	0	0	34	11	+23	15	Promoted to the 2014 Division I A
2	Japan	5	3	0	0	2	23	18	+5	9	
3	Austria	5	3	0	0	2	21	18	+3	9	
4	Poland	5	3	0	0	2	18	21	−3	9	
5	Ukraine	5	1	0	0	4	17	24	−7	3	
6	South Korea	5	0	0	0	5	8	29	−21	0	Relegated to the 2014 Division II A

Source: IIHF

=== Results ===
All times are local. (Central European Summer Time – UTC+2)

14 April 2013; 13:00	Ukraine	0–8 (0–2, 0–1, 0–5)	Kazakhstan	Winter Stadium, Tychy

Game reference

14 April 2013; 16:30	South Korea	1–4 (0–1, 0–1, 1–2)	Austria	Winter Stadium, Tychy

Game reference

14 April 2013; 20:00	Poland	5–3 (2–1, 2–2, 1–0)	Japan	Winter Stadium, Tychy

Game reference

15 April 2013; 13:00	Kazakhstan	10–1 (5–0, 2–1, 3–0)	South Korea	Winter Stadium, Tychy

Game reference

15 April 2013; 16:30	Japan	5–4 (1–2, 3–1, 1–1)	Ukraine	Winter Stadium, Tychy

Game reference

15 April 2013; 20:00	Austria	8–1 (3–0, 0–1, 5–0)	Poland	Winter Stadium, Tychy

Game reference

17 April 2013; 13:00	Japan	4–2 (0–1, 1–0, 3–1)	South Korea	Winter Stadium, Tychy

Game reference

17 April 2013; 16:30	Kazakhstan	5–1 (1–0, 1–1, 3–0)	Austria	Winter Stadium, Tychy

Game reference

17 April 2013; 20:00	Poland	3–2 (1–0, 2–1, 0–1)	Ukraine	Winter Stadium, Tychy

Game reference

18 April 2013; 13:00	Austria	1–6 (1–1, 0–1, 0–4)	Japan	Winter Stadium, Tychy

Game reference

18 April 2013; 16:30	Ukraine	6–1 (3–0, 2–0, 1–1)	South Korea	Winter Stadium, Tychy

Game reference

18 April 2013; 20:00	Kazakhstan	5–4 (1–1, 1–1, 3–2)	Poland	Winter Stadium, Tychy

Game reference

20 April 2013; 13:00	Austria	7–5 (0–2, 3–1, 4–2)	Ukraine	Winter Stadium, Tychy

Game reference

20 April 2013; 16:30	Japan	5–6 (1–4, 2–1, 2–1)	Kazakhstan	Winter Stadium, Tychy

Game reference

20 April 2013; 20:00	South Korea	3–5 (0–1, 2–2, 1–2)	Poland	Winter Stadium, Tychy

Game reference
