= 2003 IIHF World U18 Championships =

2003 IIHF World U18 Championship

Tournament details
- Host country: Russia
- Venues: 2 (in 1 host city)
- Dates: April 8–18, 2003
- Teams: 10

Final positions
- Champions: Canada (1st title)

Tournament statistics
- Games played: 31
- Goals scored: 225 (7.26 per game)
- Attendance: 90,150 (2,908 per game)
- Scoring leader: (Belarus) Kanstantsin Zakharov (16 points)

The 2003 IIHF World U18 Championships were held in Yaroslavl, Russia. The championships began on April 8, 2003, and finished on April 18, 2003. Games were played at Arena 2000 and Avtodizel Arena in Yaroslavl. Canada defeated Slovakia 3–0 in the final to claim the gold medal, while Russia defeated the United States 6–3 to capture the bronze medal.

== Championship results ==
=== Preliminary round ===
==== Group A ====
Team	Pld	W	L	D	GF	GA	GD	Pts
United States	4	3	0	1	11	7	+4	7
Slovakia	4	3	1	0	18	9	+9	6
Sweden	4	1	2	1	15	13	+2	3
Finland	4	1	2	1	14	15	−1	3
Belarus	4	0	3	1	14	28	−14	1

Source: IIHF

==== Group B ====
Team	Pld	W	L	D	GF	GA	GD	Pts
Russia	4	4	0	0	27	8	+19	8
Canada	4	2	1	1	19	10	+9	5
Czech Republic	4	2	1	1	14	11	+3	5
Switzerland	4	1	3	0	17	23	−6	2
Kazakhstan	4	0	4	0	6	31	−25	0

Source: IIHF

=== Relegation round ===
Team	Pld	W	L	D	GF	GA	GD	Pts
Finland	3	2	0	1	15	12	+3	5
Belarus	3	2	1	0	19	17	+2	4
Switzerland	3	1	1	1	18	9	+9	3
Kazakhstan	3	0	3	0	12	26	−14	0

Source: IIHF

Note: Matches Switzerland 13-2 Kazakhstan and Finland 8–6 Belarus from the preliminary round (on April 13, 2003 and April 14, 2003 respectively) are included as well since these results carry forward

=== Final round ===
Quarter finals
A2	Slovakia	2
B3	Czech Republic	1
B2	Canada	8
A3	Sweden	1

Semi finals
B1	Russia	1
QF1	Slovakia	2
A1	United States	1
QF2	Canada	2

Final
SF1	Slovakia	0
SF2	Canada	3

Russia beat United States for the Bronze medal 6–3.
Sweden beat Czech Republic for 5th place 3–2 in Overtime.

=== Final standings ===
Rk.	Team
1st place, gold medalist(s)	Canada
2nd place, silver medalist(s)	Slovakia
3rd place, bronze medalist(s)	Russia
4	United States
5	Sweden
6	Czech Republic
7	Finland
8	Belarus
9	Switzerland
10	Kazakhstan

Switzerland and Kazakhstan are relegated to Division I for the 2004 IIHF World U18 Championships.

== Division I ==
Division I consisted of two separate tournaments. The Group A tournament was held between 23 and 29 March 2003 in Ventspils, Latvia and the Group B tournament was held between 22 and 28 March 2003 in Briançon, France. Denmark and Norway won the Group A and Group B tournaments respectively and gained promotion to the Championship Division for the 2004 IIHF World U18 Championships. While Great Britain finished last in Group A and Ukraine last in Group B and were both relegated to Division II for 2004.

Final standings

Group A

1. Denmark — promoted to the Championship Division for 2004
2. Germany
3. Slovenia
4. Latvia
5. Japan
6. Great Britain — relegated to Division II for 2004

Group B

1. Norway — promoted to the Championship Division for 2004
2. Poland
3. Italy
4. France
5. Austria
6. Ukraine — relegated to Division II for 2004

== Division II ==
Division II consisted of two separate tournaments. The Group A tournament was held between 17 and 23 March 2003 in Tallinn, Estonia and the Group B tournament was held between 5 and 11 March 2003 in Belgrade, Federal Republic of Yugoslavia. South Korea and Romania won the Group A and Group B tournaments respectively and gained promotion to Division I for the 2004 IIHF World U18 Championships. While Bulgaria finished last in Group A and South Africa last in Group B and were both relegated to Division III for 2004.

Final standings

Group A

1. South Korea — promoted to Division I for 2004
2. Estonia
3. Croatia
4. Belgium
5. Spain
6. Bulgaria — relegated to Division III for 2004

Group B

1. Romania — promoted to Division I for 2004
2. Hungary
3. Netherlands
4. Yugoslavia
5. Lithuania
6. South Africa — relegated to Division III for 2004

== Division III ==
Division III consisted of two separate tournaments. The Group A tournament was held between 5 and 8 March 2003 in Mexico City, Mexico and the Group B tournament was held between 6 and 9 February 2003 in Sarajevo, Bosnia and Herzegovina. Australia and Iceland won the Group A and Group B tournaments respectively and gained promotion to Division II for the 2004 IIHF World U18 Championships.

Final standings

Group A

1. Australia — promoted to Division II for 2004
2. Mexico
3. China
4. New Zealand

Group B

1. Iceland — promoted to Division II for 2004
2. Turkey
3. Bosnia and Herzegovina
4. Israel
