= Kai Hospelt =

German ice hockey player (born 1985)

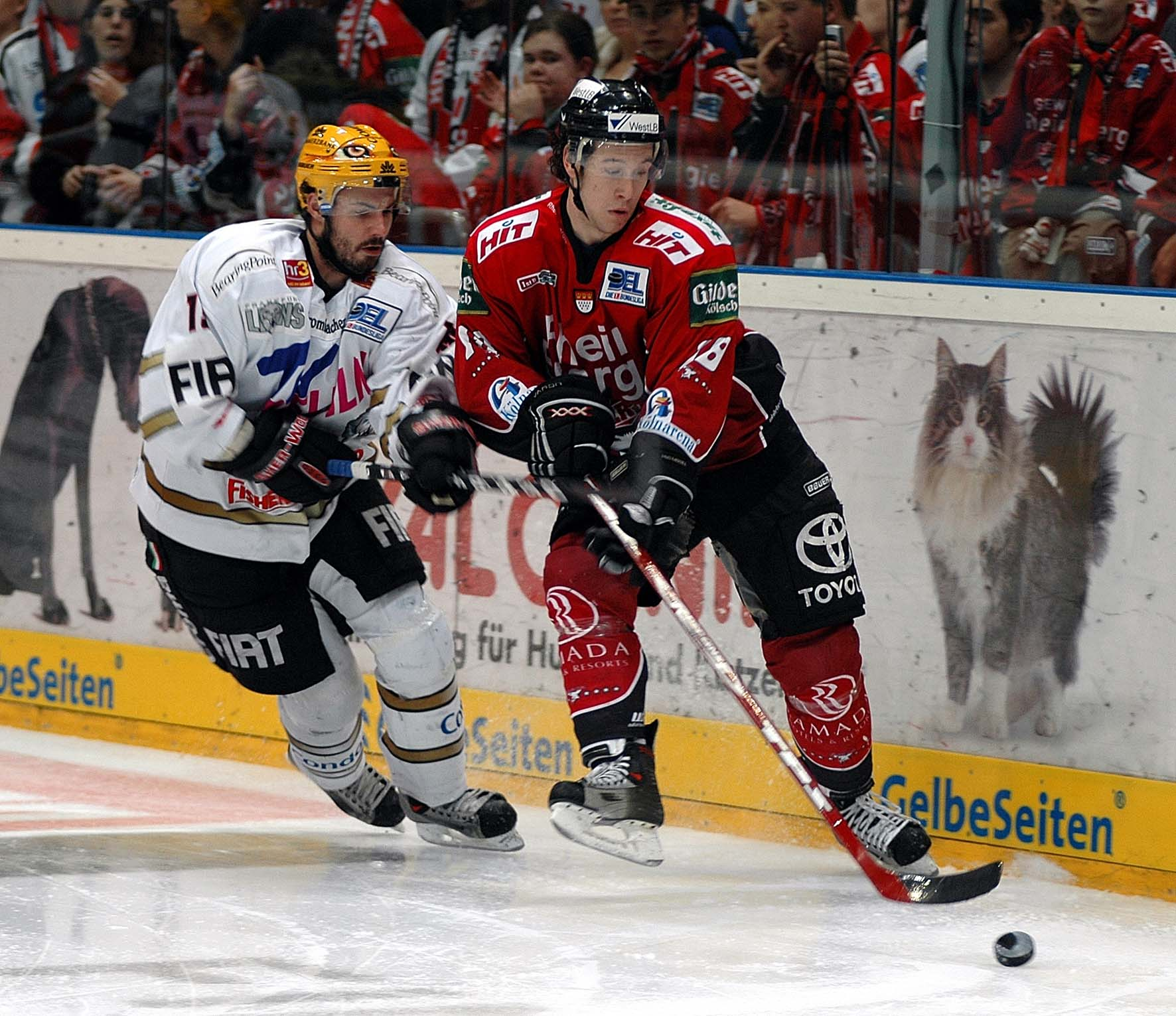
- Born: August 23, 1985 (age 40) Cologne, West Germany
- Height: 6 ft 1 in (185 cm)
- Weight: 190 lb (86 kg; 13 st 8 lb)
- Position: Forward
- Shot: Left
- DEL2 team Former teams: Ravensburg Towerstars; Kölner Haie; Grizzly Adams Wolfsburg; Adler Mannheim; Krefeld Pinguine
- National team: Germany
- NHL draft: 216th overall, 2003; San Jose Sharks
- Playing career: 2002–2021

Kai Hospelt (born August 23, 1985) is a German professional ice hockey player who last played for the Ravensburg Towerstars of the DEL2. He was an Olympian at the 2010 Olympic Winter Games in Vancouver, British Columbia, Canada.

== Playing career ==
Kai Hospelt's career started in 2002 in the Deutsche Eishockey Liga for his hometown Kölner Haie. After his first year in the DEL he was drafted by the San Jose Sharks in the 2003 NHL entry draft. Hospelt never made it to the Sharks squad, but played for five more seasons in Cologne. After six total seasons with the Sharks, he moved onto the Grizzly Adams Wolfsburg where he spent five seasons and his last two as Captain of the Grizzly Adams until the conclusion of the 2012–13 season.

On April 12, 2013, at the conclusion of his contract with Wolfsburg, Hospelt signed a three-year contract with Adler Mannheim. Following the 2015–16 campaign, he returned to his hometown team Kölner Haie.

Hospelt played a further three seasons with Kölner Haie before leaving the club as a free agent following the 2018–19 season. He agreed to a one-year contract with his fourth DEL club, Krefeld Pinguine, on April 17, 2019.

== International play ==
Hospelt has represented Germany's national team on numerous occasions. Twice (in 2002 and 2003) he played for Team Germany in the IIHF World U18 Championships. Three times (in 2003, 2004, and 2005) he represented them in the World Junior Championships. Six times (in 2009, 2010, 2011, 2012, 2014, 2015) he suited up for the national team in the World Championships. The largest honour came in 2010, when he suited up in the Olympic Games in Vancouver in 2010 and score one assist in four games as Germany fell in the qualification round. Having won 115 caps for the German men's national team, he announced his retirement from international ice hockey in July 2017.

== Career statistics ==
=== Regular season and playoffs ===
			Regular season					Playoffs
Season	Team	League	GP	G	A	Pts	PIM	GP	G	A	Pts	PIM
2000–01	Kölner Haie	DNL	38	25	18	43	16	—	—	—	—	—
2001–02	Kölner Haie	DNL	40	51	55	106	10	5	6	2	8	4
2002–03	Kölner Haie	DNL	29	39	42	81	20	3	2	5	7	2
2002–03	Kölner Haie	DEL	21	0	2	2	0	6	0	1	1	0
2003–04	Kölner Haie	DEL	47	2	2	4	18	6	0	0	0	2
2004–05	Kölner Haie	DEL	23	1	1	2	6	—	—	—	—	—
2005–06	Kölner Haie	DEL	47	5	5	10	12	9	1	1	2	0
2006–07	Kölner Haie	DEL	50	6	9	15	20	9	0	0	0	4
2007–08	Kölner Haie	DEL	17	2	4	6	4	14	0	1	1	2
2008–09	Grizzly Adams Wolfsburg	DEL	52	11	16	27	42	10	1	2	3	4
2009–10	Grizzly Adams Wolfsburg	DEL	53	20	21	41	14	7	4	4	8	4
2010–11	Grizzly Adams Wolfsburg	DEL	52	13	16	29	30	9	4	3	7	2
2011–12	Grizzly Adams Wolfsburg	DEL	52	25	25	50	35	4	1	2	3	0
2012–13	Grizzly Adams Wolfsburg	DEL	51	21	21	42	14	12	2	1	3	8
2013–14	Adler Mannheim	DEL	30	8	9	17	8	5	3	0	3	0
2014–15	Adler Mannheim	DEL	52	11	20	31	10	15	5	9	14	10
2015–16	Adler Mannheim	DEL	50	10	14	24	14	3	0	4	4	0
2016–17	Kölner Haie	DEL	51	11	16	27	10	7	1	1	2	0
2017–18	Kölner Haie	DEL	52	7	15	22	4	6	0	2	2	0
2018–19	Kölner Haie	DEL	48	4	10	14	20	11	0	0	0	0
2019–20	Krefeld Pinguine	DEL	34	3	7	10	10	—	—	—	—	—
2020–21	Ravensburg Towerstars	DEL2	42	10	12	22	8	7	0	4	4	14
DEL totals			782	160	213	373	271	133	22	31	53	36

=== International ===
Year	Team	Event	GP	G	A	Pts	PIM
2002	Germany	WJC18	8	0	0	0	2
2003	Germany	WJC	6	0	1	1	0
2003	Germany	WJC18 D1	5	7	3	10	4
2004	Germany	WJC D1	5	2	2	4	2
2005	Germany	WJC	6	0	0	0	6
2009	Germany	WC	6	0	1	1	2
2010	Germany	OG	4	0	1	1	2
2010	Germany	WC	9	0	2	2	2
2011	Germany	WC	7	1	2	3	4
2012	Germany	WC	7	1	3	4	4
2013	Germany	OGQ	3	0	0	0	0
2014	Germany	WC	7	2	3	5	2
2015	Germany	WC	7	0	1	1	4
Junior totals			30	9	6	15	14
Senior totals			50	4	13	17	20
