= 2022 IIHF World U18 Championship Division I =

2022 IIHF U18 World Championship Division I
Tournament details
- Host countries: Slovakia; Italy
- Venues: 2 (in 2 host cities)
- Dates: 11–17 April (Group A); 25 April – 1 May (Group B)
- Teams: 12

The 2022 IIHF U18 World Championship Division I was two international under-18 ice hockey tournaments organised by the International Ice Hockey Federation. The Division I A and Division I B tournaments represent the second and the third tier of the IIHF World U18 Championship.

== Division I A ==
2022 IIHF U18 World Championship Division I A

Tournament details
- Host country: Slovakia
- Venue: 1 (in 1 host city)
- Dates: 11–17 April
- Teams: 6

Tournament statistics
- Games played: 15
- Goals scored: 106 (7.07 per game)
- Attendance: 14,396 (960 per game)
- Scoring leader: (Norway) Martin Johnsen (14 points)

The Division I A tournament was played in Piešťany, Slovakia, from 11 to 17 April 2022.

=== Participants ===
Team	Qualification
Slovakia	hosts, placed 10th in 2019 Top Division and were relegated
Kazakhstan	placed 2nd in 2019 Division I A
Denmark	placed 3rd in 2019 Division I A
Norway	placed 4th in 2019 Division I A
France	placed 5th in 2019 Division I A
Japan	placed 1st in 2019 Division I B and were promoted

=== Standings ===
Pos	Team	Pld	W	OTW	OTL	L	GF	GA	GD	Pts	Promotion
1	Slovakia (H)	5	5	0	0	0	27	11	+16	15	Promoted to the 2023 Top Division
2	Norway	5	4	0	0	1	26	12	+14	12	Promoted to the 2023 Top Division
3	France	5	3	0	0	2	16	17	−1	9	
4	Kazakhstan	5	2	0	0	3	15	23	−8	6	
5	Denmark	5	1	0	0	4	14	16	−2	3	
6	Japan	5	0	0	0	5	8	27	−19	0	

Source: IIHF
Rules for classification: 1) points; 2) head-to-head points; 3) head-to-head goal difference; 4) head-to-head number of goals scored; 5) result against closest best-ranked team outside tied teams; 6) result against second-best ranked team outside tied teams; 7) seeding before tournament.
(H) Host

=== Results ===
All times are local (UTC+2).

11 April 2022; 12:00	France	4–3 (2–1, 0–1, 2–1)	Denmark	Easton Arena, Piešťany; Attendance: 112

Game reference
16 min	Penalties	14 min
23	Shots	38

11 April 2022; 15:30	Norway	9–2 (2–0, 2–1, 5–1)	Kazakhstan	Easton Arena, Piešťany; Attendance: 105

Game reference
8 min	Penalties	10 min
29	Shots	38

11 April 2022; 19:00	Japan	2–8 (0–2, 1–4, 1–2)	Slovakia	Easton Arena, Piešťany; Attendance: 1,714

Game reference
6 min	Penalties	8 min
15	Shots	53

12 April 2022; 12:00	Kazakhstan	2–4 (0–0, 1–2, 1–2)	France	Easton Arena, Piešťany; Attendance: 90

Game reference
8 min	Penalties	10 min
42	Shots	36

12 April 2022; 15:30	Denmark	6–1 (1–1, 2–0, 3–0)	Japan	Easton Arena, Piešťany; Attendance: 110

Game reference
8 min	Penalties	8 min
35	Shots	24

12 April 2022; 19:00	Slovakia	5–2 (1–2, 3–0, 1–0)	Norway	Easton Arena, Piešťany; Attendance: 2,646

Game reference
14 min	Penalties	18 min
35	Shots	29

14 April 2022; 12:00	Japan	2–5 (1–2, 0–1, 1–2)	Norway	Easton Arena, Piešťany; Attendance: 139

Game reference
12 min	Penalties	10 min
29	Shots	38

14 April 2022; 15:30	Kazakhstan	4–2 (0–0, 2–1, 2–1)	Denmark	Easton Arena, Piešťany; Attendance: 182

Game reference
8 min	Penalties	8 min
33	Shots	19

14 April 2022; 19:00	Slovakia	6–3 (1–0, 3–3, 2–0)	France	Easton Arena, Piešťany; Attendance: 2,738

Game reference
6 min	Penalties	10 min
51	Shots	28

15 April 2022; 12:00	Kazakhstan	4–3 (0–2, 1–0, 3–1)	Japan	Easton Arena, Piešťany; Attendance: 183

Game reference
12 min	Penalties	14 min
34	Shots	21

15 April 2022; 15:30	Norway	6–1 (4–1, 1–0, 1–0)	France	Easton Arena, Piešťany; Attendance: 374

Game reference
14 min	Penalties	14 min
37	Shots	16

15 April 2022; 19:00	Denmark	1–3 (1–1, 0–0, 0–2)	Slovakia	Easton Arena, Piešťany; Attendance: 2,738

Game reference
10 min	Penalties	10 min
17	Shots	35

17 April 2022; 12:00	France	4–0 (0–0, 1–0, 3–0)	Japan	Easton Arena, Piešťany; Attendance: 168

Game reference
8 min	Penalties	6 min
28	Shots	28

17 April 2022; 15:30	Denmark	2–4 (0–1, 1–1, 1–2)	Norway	Easton Arena, Piešťany; Attendance: 319

Game reference
18 min	Penalties	35 min
25	Shots	26

17 April 2022; 19:00	Slovakia	5–3 (1–0, 1–1, 3–2)	Kazakhstan	Easton Arena, Piešťany; Attendance: 2,778

Game reference
12 min	Penalties	8 min
32	Shots	27

== Division I B ==
2022 IIHF U18 World Championship Division I B

Tournament details
- Host country: Italy
- Venue: 1 (in 1 host city)
- Dates: 25 April – 1 May
- Teams: 6

Tournament statistics
- Games played: 15
- Goals scored: 98 (6.53 per game)
- Attendance: 3,229 (215 per game)
- Scoring leader: (Ukraine) Mykyta Sydorenko (10 points)

The Division I B tournament was played in Asiago, Italy, from 25 April to 1 May 2022.

=== Participants ===
Team	Qualification
Ukraine	placed 6th in 2019 Division I A and were relegated
Austria	placed 2nd in 2019 Division I B
Hungary	placed 3rd in 2019 Division I B
Italy	hosts, placed 4th in 2019 Division I B
Slovenia	placed 5th in 2019 Division I B
Poland	placed 1st in 2019 Division II A and were promoted

=== Standings ===
Pos	Team	Pld	W	OTW	OTL	L	GF	GA	GD	Pts	Promotion
1	Hungary	5	5	0	0	0	19	3	+16	15	Promoted to the 2023 Division I A
2	Ukraine	5	4	0	0	1	30	11	+19	12	Promoted to the 2023 Division I A
3	Italy (H)	5	3	0	0	2	15	18	−3	9	
4	Slovenia	5	2	0	0	3	12	12	0	6	
5	Austria	5	1	0	0	4	11	24	−13	3	
6	Poland	5	0	0	0	5	11	30	−19	0	

Source: IIHF
Rules for classification: 1) points; 2) head-to-head points; 3) head-to-head goal difference; 4) head-to-head number of goals scored; 5) result against closest best-ranked team outside tied teams; 6) result against second-best ranked team outside tied teams; 7) seeding before tournament.
(H) Host

=== Results ===
All times are local (UTC+2).

25 April 2022; 12:30	Poland	1–6 (0–1, 0–1, 1–4)	Ukraine	Pala Hodegart, Asiago; Attendance: 70

Game reference
4 min	Penalties	12 min
21	Shots	33

25 April 2022; 16:00	Slovenia	0–3 (0–1, 0–1, 0–1)	Hungary	Pala Hodegart, Asiago; Attendance: 110

Game reference
2 min	Penalties	4 min
28	Shots	25

25 April 2022; 19:30	Italy	2–1 (1–1, 1–0, 0–0)	Austria	Pala Hodegart, Asiago; Attendance: 363

Game reference
10 min	Penalties	8 min
30	Shots	45

26 April 2022; 12:30	Hungary	5–2 (2–0, 1–1, 2–1)	Poland	Pala Hodegart, Asiago; Attendance: 107

Game reference
10 min	Penalties	4 min
27	Shots	23

26 April 2022; 16:00	Austria	1–4 (0–2, 1–2, 0–0)	Slovenia	Pala Hodegart, Asiago; Attendance: 86

Game reference
37 min	Penalties	12 min
27	Shots	25

26 April 2022; 19:30	Ukraine	6–3 (1–2, 4–1, 1–0)	Italy	Pala Hodegart, Asiago; Attendance: 250

Game reference
4 min	Penalties	8 min
40	Shots	25

28 April 2022; 12:30	Austria	0–4 (0–2, 0–1, 0–1)	Hungary	Pala Hodegart, Asiago; Attendance: 110

Game reference
10 min	Penalties	12 min
22	Shots	21

28 April 2022; 16:00	Poland	5–8 (2–3, 1–4, 2–1)	Italy	Pala Hodegart, Asiago; Attendance: 190

Game reference
10 min	Penalties	12 min
28	Shots	27

28 April 2022; 19:30	Ukraine	5–1 (0–0, 2–1, 3–0)	Slovenia	Pala Hodegart, Asiago; Attendance: 200

Game reference
8 min	Penalties	12 min
32	Shots	26

29 April 2022; 12:30	Austria	5–2 (1–0, 3–2, 1–0)	Poland	Pala Hodegart, Asiago; Attendance: 136

Game reference
6 min	Penalties	10 min
45	Shots	14

29 April 2022; 16:00	Hungary	2–1 (0–0, 0–1, 2–0)	Ukraine	Pala Hodegart, Asiago; Attendance: 313

Game reference
8 min	Penalties	8 min
20	Shots	34

29 April 2022; 19:30	Italy	2–1 (0–1, 0–0, 2–0)	Slovenia	Pala Hodegart, Asiago; Attendance: 430

Game reference
4 min	Penalties	10 min
24	Shots	21

1 May 2022; 12:30	Ukraine	12–4 (4–0, 5–2, 3–2)	Austria	Pala Hodegart, Asiago; Attendance: 344

Game reference
10 min	Penalties	39 min
39	Shots	32

1 May 2022; 16:00	Slovenia	6–1 (3–0, 1–1, 2–0)	Poland	Pala Hodegart, Asiago

Game reference
8 min	Penalties	14 min
23	Shots	14

1 May 2022; 19:30	Hungary	5–0 (0–0, 2–0, 3–0)	Italy	Pala Hodegart, Asiago; Attendance: 520

Game reference
12 min	Penalties	8 min
23	Shots	24
