= Marcus Kink =

German ice hockey player (born 1985)

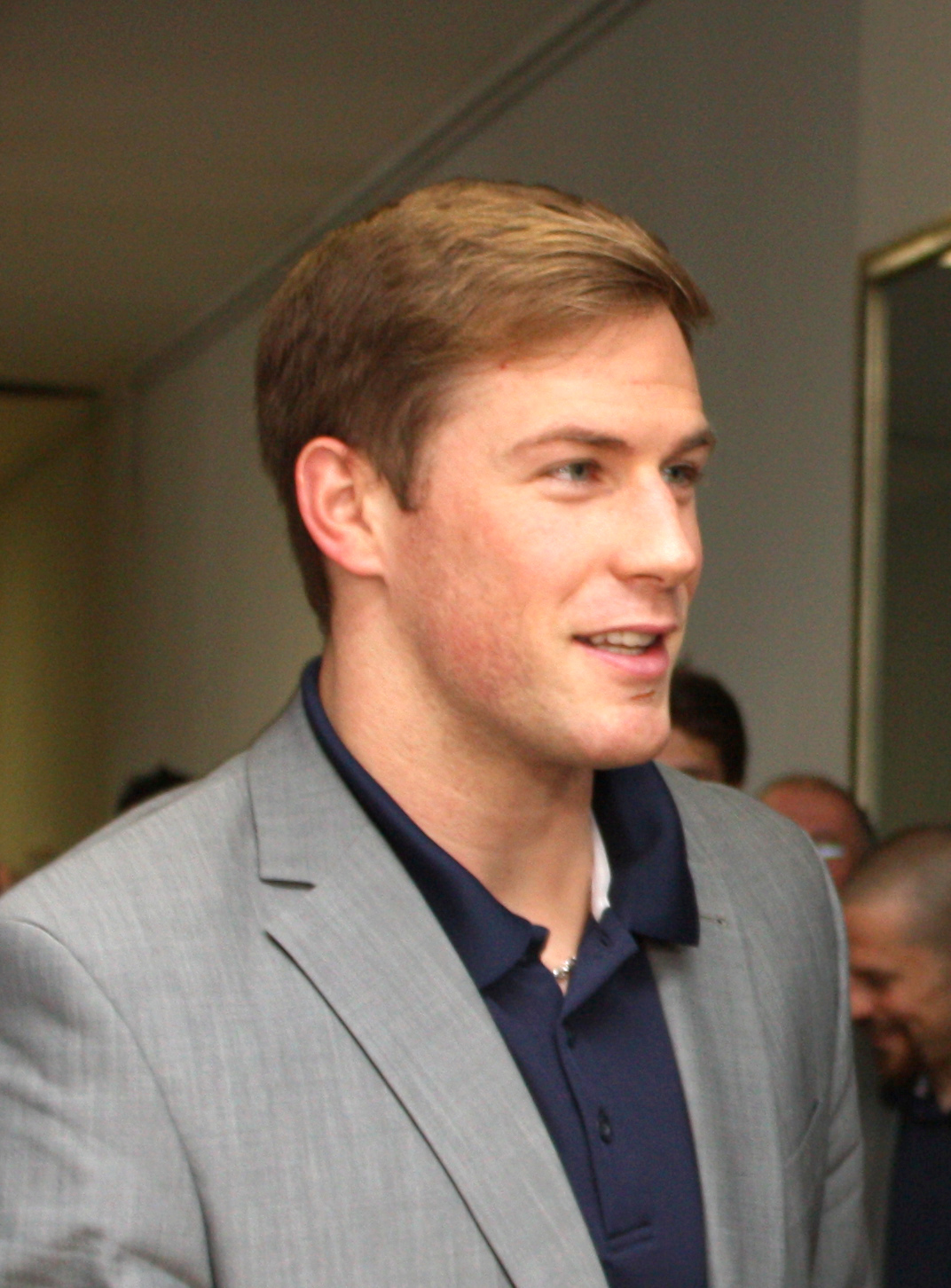
- Born: 13 January 1985 (age 40); Düsseldorf, West Germany
- Height: 6 ft 1 in (185 cm)
- Weight: 214 lb (97 kg; 15 st 4 lb)
- Position: Left wing
- Shot: Left
- DEL team Former teams: Adler Mannheim; Kölner Haie
- National team: Germany
- Playing career: 2001–2019

Marcus Kink (born 13 January 1985) is a German professional ice hockey forward who is currently playing as the Captain for Adler Mannheim in the Deutsche Eishockey Liga (DEL).

He has represented the German national team in numerous IIHF World Championships tournaments and was nominated to the Olympic Games in 2018.

== Career statistics ==
=== Regular season and playoffs ===
			Regular season					Playoffs
Season	Team	League	GP	G	A	Pts	PIM	GP	G	A	Pts	PIM
2000–01	SC Riessersee	DNL	40	29	43	72	56	2	0	3	3	14
2001–02	SC Riessersee	DNL	42	48	67	115	128	—	—	—	—	—
2001–02	SC Riessersee	2.GBun	6	0	0	0	0	—	—	—	—	—
2002–03	Kölner Haie	DEL	40	1	2	3	10	4	0	0	0	0
2002–03	EV Duisburg	2.GBun	13	2	4	6	8	—	—	—	—	—
2003–04	Kölner Haie	DEL	47	2	2	4	28	4	0	0	0	25
2004–05	Adler Mannheim	DEL	39	2	5	7	14	14	1	1	2	20
2004–05	Heilbronner Falken	3.GBun	6	0	3	3	35	—	—	—	—	—
2005–06	Adler Mannheim	DEL	45	5	8	13	72	—	—	—	—	—
2005–06	Heilbronner Falken	3.GBun	1	0	0	0	4	—	—	—	—	—
2006–07	Adler Mannheim	DEL	32	1	4	5	18	11	0	0	0	2
2006–07	Heilbronner Falken	3.GBun	2	0	0	0	0	—	—	—	—	—
2007–08	Adler Mannheim	DEL	47	3	5	8	62	5	0	0	0	2
2007–08	Heilbronner Falken	2.GBun	11	2	4	6	12	5	2	5	7	10
2008–09	Adler Mannheim	DEL	50	5	13	18	70	9	1	4	5	8
2009–10	Adler Mannheim	DEL	53	7	19	26	75	2	0	0	0	0
2010–11	Adler Mannheim	DEL	51	4	15	19	52	6	1	3	4	16
2011–12	Adler Mannheim	DEL	47	9	13	22	116	14	3	1	4	2
2012–13	Adler Mannheim	DEL	52	11	9	20	65	6	0	0	0	0
2013–14	Adler Mannheim	DEL	52	13	13	26	83	5	0	0	0	2
2014–15	Adler Mannheim	DEL	46	11	16	27	98	15	2	2	4	6
2015–16	Adler Mannheim	DEL	38	2	7	9	47	3	0	1	1	2
2016–17	Adler Mannheim	DEL	51	8	9	17	44	7	1	1	2	8
2017–18	Adler Mannheim	DEL	51	3	16	19	22	10	2	2	4	18
2018–19	Adler Mannheim	DEL	46	3	7	10	38	5	0	1	1	2
DEL totals			787	90	163	253	914	120	11	16	27	113

=== International ===
Medal record

Representing Germany

Ice hockey

Olympic Games
Silver medal – second place	2018 Pyeongchang	

Year	Team	Event	Result	GP	G	A	Pts	PIM
2002	Germany	WJC18	10th	8	1	0	1	24
2003	Germany	WJC	9th	6	0	0	0	18
2003	Germany	WJC18 D1	13th	5	5	3	8	6
2004	Germany	WJC D1	12th	5	5	5	10	6
2005	Germany	WJC	9th	6	1	1	2	8
2011	Germany	WC	7th	3	0	2	2	4
2012	Germany	WC	12th	6	1	0	1	2
2013	Germany	OGQ	NQ	3	0	0	0	2
2013	Germany	WC	9th	7	3	0	3	4
2014	Germany	WC	14th	6	0	0	0	4
2015	Germany	WC	10th	7	1	0	1	4
2016	Germany	WC	7th	8	0	0	0	4
2016	Germany	OGQ	Q	3	0	1	1	6
2017	Germany	WC	8th	8	0	2	2	4
2018	Germany	OG	2nd place, silver medalist(s)	7	0	1	1	0
Junior totals				30	12	9	21	62
Senior totals				58	5	6	11	34

== Awards and honours ==
Award	Year
DEL
All-Star Game	2005
Champion (Adler Mannheim)	2007, 2015, 2019
