= 2014 IIHF World U18 Championship Division I =

2014 IIHF U18 World Championship Division I

Tournament details
- Host countries: France; Hungary
- Venues: 2 (in 2 host cities)
- Dates: 13–19 April 2014
- Teams: 12

The 2014 IIHF U18 World Championship Division I was two international under-18 ice hockey tournaments organised by the International Ice Hockey Federation. The Division I A and Division I B tournaments represent the second and the third tier of the IIHF World U18 Championship.

== Division I A ==
The Division I A tournament was played in Nice, France, from 13 to 19 April 2014.

=== Participants ===
Team	Qualification
Latvia	placed 10th in 2013 Top Division and were relegated
Norway	placed 2nd in 2013 Division I A
Italy	placed 3rd in 2013 Division I A
Belarus	placed 4th in 2013 Division I A
France	hosts, placed 5th in 2013 Division I A
Kazakhstan	placed 1st in 2013 Division I B and were promoted

=== Final standings ===
Pos	Team	Pld	W	OTW	OTL	L	GF	GA	GD	Pts	Promotion or relegation
1	Latvia	5	4	0	0	1	20	11	+9	12	Promoted to the 2015 Top Division
2	Norway	5	3	1	0	1	26	12	+14	11	
3	Kazakhstan	5	3	0	1	1	17	11	+6	10	
4	Belarus	5	2	1	1	1	15	12	+3	9	
5	France	5	1	0	0	4	9	22	−13	3	
6	Italy	5	0	0	0	5	8	27	−19	0	Relegated to the 2015 Division I B

Source: IIHF

=== Results ===
All times are local. (Central European Summer Time – UTC+2)

13 April 2014; 12:30	Kazakhstan	2–5 (1–0, 1–1, 0–4)	Latvia	Palais des Sports, Nice; Attendance: 120

Game reference

13 April 2014; 16:00	Belarus	4–5 GWS (1–2, 1–2, 2–0) (OT: 0–0) (SO: 0–1)	Norway	Palais des Sports, Nice; Attendance: 272

Game reference

13 April 2014; 19:30	France	5–3 (2–2, 2–1, 1–0)	Italy	Palais des Sports, Nice; Attendance: 1,055

Game reference

14 April 2014; 12:30	Latvia	3–2 (1–1, 1–0, 1–1)	Belarus	Palais des Sports, Nice; Attendance: 482

Game reference

14 April 2014; 16:00	Italy	1–5 (0–1, 0–3, 1–1)	Kazakhstan	Palais des Sports, Nice; Attendance: 75

Game reference

14 April 2014; 19:30	Norway	6–1 (1–1, 2–0, 3–0)	France	Palais des Sports, Nice; Attendance: 916

Game reference

16 April 2014; 12:30	Norway	9–0 (3–0, 2–0, 4–0)	Italy	Palais des Sports, Nice; Attendance: 83

Game reference

16 April 2014; 16:00	Kazakhstan	1–2 GWS (0–1, 0–0, 1–0) (OT: 0–0) (SO: 0–1)	Belarus	Palais des Sports, Nice; Attendance: 118

Game reference

16 April 2014; 19:30	Latvia	5–1 (2–1, 3–0, 0–0)	France	Palais des Sports, Nice; Attendance: 857

Game reference

17 April 2014; 12:30	Norway	2–5 (1–0, 0–2, 1–3)	Kazakhstan	Palais des Sports, Nice; Attendance: 1,022

Game reference

17 April 2014; 16:00	Italy	2–5 (0–0, 1–2, 1–3)	Latvia	Palais des Sports, Nice; Attendance: 64

Game reference

17 April 2014; 19:30	Belarus	4–1 (0–0, 0–1, 4–0)	France	Palais des Sports, Nice; Attendance: 603

Game reference

19 April 2014; 12:30	Italy	2–3 (0–1, 1–1, 1–1)	Belarus	Palais des Sports, Nice; Attendance: 78

Game reference

19 April 2014; 16:00	Latvia	2–4 (1–0, 1–1, 0–3)	Norway	Palais des Sports, Nice; Attendance: 595

Game reference

19 April 2014; 19:30	France	1–4 (1–0, 0–1, 0–3)	Kazakhstan	Palais des Sports, Nice

Game reference

== Division I B ==
The Division I B tournament was played in Székesfehérvár, Hungary, from 13 to 19 April 2014.

=== Participants ===
Team	Qualification
Slovenia	placed 6th in 2013 Division I A and were relegated
Japan	placed 2nd in 2013 Division I B
Austria	placed 3rd in 2013 Division I B
Poland	placed 4th in 2013 Division I B
Ukraine	placed 5th in 2013 Division I B
Hungary	hosts, placed 1st in 2013 Division II A and were promoted

=== Final standings ===
Pos	Team	Pld	W	OTW	OTL	L	GF	GA	GD	Pts	Promotion or relegation
1	Hungary	5	5	0	0	0	35	10	+25	15	Promoted to the 2015 Division I A
2	Austria	5	3	0	0	2	15	10	+5	9	
3	Slovenia	5	3	0	0	2	15	16	−1	9	
4	Japan	5	3	0	0	2	22	20	+2	9	
5	Ukraine	5	1	0	0	4	15	16	−1	3	
6	Poland	5	0	0	0	5	5	35	−30	0	Relegated to the 2015 Division II A

Source: IIHF

=== Results ===
All times are local. (Central European Summer Time – UTC+2)

13 April 2014; 13:00	Poland	2–8 (1–3, 1–3, 0–2)	Japan	Ifjabb Ocskai Gábor Jégcsarnok, Székesfehérvár; Attendance: 145

Game reference

13 April 2014; 16:30	Hungary	6–1 (2–1, 1–0, 3–0)	Slovenia	Ifjabb Ocskai Gábor Jégcsarnok, Székesfehérvár; Attendance: 1,050

Game reference

13 April 2014; 20:00	Ukraine	2–3 (1–1, 1–2, 0–0)	Austria	Ifjabb Ocskai Gábor Jégcsarnok, Székesfehérvár; Attendance: 156

Game reference

14 April 2014; 13:00	Slovenia	4–3 (2–1, 1–2, 1–0)	Poland	Ifjabb Ocskai Gábor Jégcsarnok, Székesfehérvár; Attendance: 197

Game reference

14 April 2014; 16:30	Austria	2–6 (2–1, 0–2, 0–3)	Hungary	Ifjabb Ocskai Gábor Jégcsarnok, Székesfehérvár; Attendance: 1,500

Game reference

14 April 2014; 20:00	Japan	4–2 (1–0, 1–0, 2–2)	Ukraine	Ifjabb Ocskai Gábor Jégcsarnok, Székesfehérvár; Attendance: 120

Game reference

16 April 2014; 13:00	Slovenia	5–2 (3–0, 1–1, 1–1)	Ukraine	Ifjabb Ocskai Gábor Jégcsarnok, Székesfehérvár; Attendance: 90

Game reference

16 April 2014; 16:30	Hungary	11–0 (3–0, 4–0, 4–0)	Poland	Ifjabb Ocskai Gábor Jégcsarnok, Székesfehérvár; Attendance: 1,650

Game reference

16 April 2014; 20:00	Japan	1–4 (0–1, 1–3, 0–0)	Austria	Ifjabb Ocskai Gábor Jégcsarnok, Székesfehérvár; Attendance: 126

Game reference

17 April 2014; 13:00	Poland	0–6 (0–0, 0–4, 0–2)	Ukraine	Ifjabb Ocskai Gábor Jégcsarnok, Székesfehérvár; Attendance: 90

Game reference

17 April 2014; 16:30	Japan	4–8 (2–2, 0–3, 2–3)	Hungary	Ifjabb Ocskai Gábor Jégcsarnok, Székesfehérvár; Attendance: 2,100

Game reference

17 April 2014; 20:00	Austria	0–1 (0–0, 0–1, 0–0)	Slovenia	Ifjabb Ocskai Gábor Jégcsarnok, Székesfehérvár; Attendance: 116

Game reference

19 April 2014; 13:00	Slovenia	4–5 (1–1, 3–2, 0–2)	Japan	Ifjabb Ocskai Gábor Jégcsarnok, Székesfehérvár; Attendance: 370

Game reference

19 April 2014; 16:30	Ukraine	3–4 (2–2, 1–1, 0–1)	Hungary	Ifjabb Ocskai Gábor Jégcsarnok, Székesfehérvár; Attendance: 2,150

Game reference

19 April 2014; 20:00	Austria	6–0 (2–0, 1–0, 3–0)	Poland	Ifjabb Ocskai Gábor Jégcsarnok, Székesfehérvár

Game reference
