= 2008 IIHF World U18 Championship Division I =

International ice hockey competition

Tournament details
- Host countries: Poland; Latvia
- Venues: 2 (in 2 host cities)
- Dates: 2–8 April 2008
- Teams: 12

The 2008 IIHF World U18 Championship Division I was an international under-18 ice hockey competition organised by the International Ice Hockey Federation. Both Division I tournaments made up the second level of the 2008 IIHF World U18 Championships. The Group A tournament was played in Toruń, Poland, and the Group B tournament was played in Riga, Latvia, both from 2 to 8 April 2008. The Czech Republic and Norway won the Group A and B tournaments respectively and gained promotion to the Top Division of the 2009 IIHF World U18 Championships.

== Group A ==
The Group A tournament was played in Toruń, Poland, from 2 to 8 April 2008.

=== Final standings ===
Pos	Team	Pld	W	OTW	OTL	L	GF	GA	GD	Pts	Promotion or relegation
1	Czech Republic	5	5	0	0	0	36	5	+31	15	Promoted to the 2009 Top Division
2	Kazakhstan	5	3	0	0	2	19	13	+6	9	
3	Lithuania	5	2	0	0	3	13	26	−13	6	
4	Poland	5	2	0	0	3	7	18	−11	6	
5	Ukraine	5	2	0	0	3	8	12	−4	6	
6	Slovenia	5	1	0	0	4	15	24	−9	3	Relegated to the 2009 Division II

Source: IIHF

=== Results ===
All times are local.

2 April 2008; 13:00	Ukraine	0–2 (0–1, 0–0, 0–1)	Kazakhstan	Arena Toruń, Toruń

Game reference

2 April 2008; 16:30	Lithuania	1–7 (1–2, 0–2, 0–3)	Czech Republic	Arena Toruń, Toruń

Game reference

2 April 2008; 20:00	Poland	0–5 (0–2, 0–2, 0–1)	Slovenia	Arena Toruń, Toruń

Game reference

3 April 2008; 13:00	Kazakhstan	9–0 (3–0, 4–0, 2–0)	Lithuania	Arena Toruń, Toruń

Game reference

3 April 2008; 16:30	Slovenia	1–3 (0–1, 0–2, 1–0)	Ukraine	Arena Toruń, Toruń

Game reference

3 April 2008; 20:00	Czech Republic	9–0 (3–0, 4–0, 2–0)	Poland	Arena Toruń, Toruń

Game reference

5 April 2008; 13:00	Slovenia	2–7 (1–1, 1–4, 0–2)	Kazakhstan	Arena Toruń, Toruń

Game reference

5 April 2008; 16:30	Lithuania	2–3 (1–1, 0–1, 1–1)	Poland	Arena Toruń, Toruń

Game reference

5 April 2008; 20:00	Czech Republic	5–2 (1–0, 2–2, 2–0)	Ukraine	Arena Toruń, Toruń

Game reference

6 April 2008; 13:00	Slovenia	5–6 (1–2, 4–1, 0–3)	Lithuania	Arena Toruń, Toruń

Game reference

6 April 2008; 16:30	Poland	0–1 (0–0, 0–0, 0–1)	Ukraine	Arena Toruń, Toruń

Game reference

6 April 2008; 20:00	Kazakhstan	0–7 (0–0, 0–2, 0–5)	Czech Republic	Arena Toruń, Toruń

Game reference

8 April 2008; 12:30	Ukraine	2–4 (1–2, 1–0, 0–2)	Lithuania	Arena Toruń, Toruń

Game reference

8 April 2008; 16:00	Czech Republic	8–2 (2–0, 5–1, 1–1)	Slovenia	Arena Toruń, Toruń

Game reference

8 April 2008; 19:30	Kazakhstan	1–4 (0–2, 1–2, 0–0)	Poland	Arena Toruń, Toruń

Game reference

== Group B ==
The Group B tournament was played in Riga, Latvia, from 2 to 8 April 2008.

=== Final standings ===
Pos	Team	Pld	W	OTW	OTL	L	GF	GA	GD	Pts	Promotion or relegation
1	Norway	5	5	0	0	0	15	3	+12	15	Promoted to the 2009 Top Division
2	Latvia	5	4	0	0	1	21	2	+19	12	
3	Austria	5	2	1	0	2	11	6	+5	8	
4	Italy	5	2	0	1	2	17	10	+7	7	
5	Japan	5	1	0	0	4	12	26	−14	3	
6	Netherlands	5	0	0	0	5	4	33	−29	0	Relegated to the 2009 Division II

Source: IIHF

=== Results ===
All times are local.

2 April 2008; 13:00	Austria	1–2 (0–0, 1–2, 0–0)	Norway	Arena Riga, Riga

Game reference

2 April 2008; 16:30	Italy	4–3 (2–0, 1–2, 1–1)	Japan	Arena Riga, Riga

Game reference

2 April 2008; 20:00	Netherlands	0–7 (0–3, 0–1, 0–3)	Latvia	Arena Riga, Riga

Game reference

3 April 2008; 13:00	Japan	1–6 (0–2, 0–0, 1–4)	Austria	Arena Riga, Riga

Game reference

3 April 2008; 16:30	Norway	7–0 (2–0, 4–0, 1–0)	Netherlands	Arena Riga, Riga

Game reference

3 April 2008; 20:00	Latvia	3–1 (2–0, 0–0, 1–1)	Italy	Arena Riga, Riga

Game reference

5 April 2008; 13:00	Netherlands	0–10 (0–2, 0–2, 0–6)	Italy	Arena Riga, Riga

Game reference

5 April 2008; 16:30	Japan	1–3 (0–0, 0–1, 1–2)	Norway	Arena Riga, Riga

Game reference

5 April 2008; 20:00	Latvia	2–0 (1–0, 1–0, 0–0)	Austria	Arena Riga, Riga

Game reference

6 April 2008; 13:00	Japan	7–4 (3–0, 2–0, 2–4)	Netherlands	Arena Riga, Riga

Game reference

6 April 2008; 16:30	Italy	1–2 GWS (0–0, 1–1, 0–0, 0–0, 0–1)	Austria	Arena Riga, Riga

Game reference

6 April 2008; 20:00	Norway	1–0 (0–0, 1–0, 0–0)	Latvia	Arena Riga, Riga

Game reference

8 April 2008; 12:30	Norway	2–1 (2–1, 0–0, 0–0)	Italy	Arena Riga, Riga

Game reference

8 April 2008; 16:00	Austria	2–0 (2–0, 0–0, 0–0)	Netherlands	Arena Riga, Riga

Game reference

8 April 2008; 19:30	Latvia	9–0 (1–0, 5–0, 3–0)	Japan	Arena Riga, Riga

Game reference
