= 2000 IIHF World U18 Championships =

2000 IIHF World U18 Championship

Tournament details
- Host country: Switzerland
- Venue(s): 2 (in 2 host cities)
- Dates: April 14–24, 2000
- Teams: 10

Final positions
- Champions: Finland (2nd title)
- Runner-up: Russia
- Third place: Sweden
- Fourth place: Switzerland

Tournament statistics
- Games played: 31
- Goals scored: 216 (6.97 per game)
- Attendance: 33,988 (1,096 per game)
- Scoring leader(s): (Russia) Yegor Shastin (11 points)

The 2000 IIHF World U18 Championships were held in Kloten and Weinfelden, Switzerland. The championships ran between April 14 and April 24, 2000. Games were played at Eishalle Schluefweg in Kloten and Sportanlage Güttingersreuti in Weinfelden. Finland defeated Russia 3–1 in the final to win the gold medal, while Sweden defeated Switzerland 7–1 to capture the bronze medal.

== Championship results ==
=== Preliminary round ===
==== Group A ====
Pos	Team	Pld	W	L	D	GF	GA	GD	Pts
1	Sweden	4	4	0	0	21	5	+16	8
2	Switzerland	4	3	1	0	18	12	+6	6
3	Czech Republic	4	2	2	0	15	12	+3	4
4	Germany	4	0	3	1	8	15	−7	1
5	Ukraine	4	0	3	1	6	24	−18	1

Source: IIHF

==== Group B ====
Pos	Team	Pld	W	L	D	GF	GA	GD	Pts
1	Russia	4	4	0	0	33	4	+29	8
2	Finland	4	3	1	0	19	9	+10	6
3	Slovakia	4	2	2	0	12	10	+2	4
4	United States	4	1	3	0	13	13	0	2
5	Belarus	4	0	4	0	4	45	−41	0

Source: IIHF

=== Relegation Round ===
Pos	Team	Pld	W	L	D	GF	GA	GD	Pts
1	Germany	3	2	0	1	17	5	+12	5
2	United States	3	2	1	0	16	4	+12	4
3	Ukraine	3	1	1	1	12	13	−1	3
4	Belarus	3	0	3	0	4	27	−23	0

Source: IIHF

Note: The following matches from the preliminary round carry forward to the relegation round:

- April 18, 2000: Ukraine 4–4 Germany
- April 18, 2000: Belarus 1–9 United States

=== Final round ===
Quarterfinals
A2	Switzerland	3
B3	Slovakia	0
B2	Finland	3
A3	Czech Republic	0

Semifinals
B1	Russia	4
A2	Switzerland	1
A1	Sweden	2
B2	Finland	4

Final
B1	Russia	1
B2	Finland	3
Third place
A1	Sweden	7
A2	Switzerland	1

==== Quarterfinals ====
April 21, 2000	Switzerland	3–0	Slovakia	Eishalle Schluefweg, Kloten; Attendance: 3,177

April 21, 2000	Finland	3–0	Czech Republic	Eishalle Schluefweg, Kloten; Attendance: 968

==== Semifinals ====
April 22, 2000	Sweden	2–4	Finland	Eishalle Schluefweg, Kloten; Attendance: 864

April 22, 2000	Russia	4–1	Switzerland	Eishalle Schluefweg, Kloten; Attendance: 4,131

==== Fifth place game ====
April 24, 2000	Slovakia	4–3 (SO)	Czech Republic	Sportanlage Güttingersreuti, Weinfelden; Attendance: 300

==== Bronze medal game ====
April 24, 2000	Sweden	7–1	Switzerland	Eishalle Schluefweg, Kloten; Attendance: 3,633

==== Gold medal game ====
April 24, 2000	Russia	1–3	Finland	Eishalle Schluefweg, Kloten; Attendance: 3,288

=== Final standings ===
Rk.	Team
1st place, gold medalist(s)	Finland
2nd place, silver medalist(s)	Russia
3rd place, bronze medalist(s)	Sweden
4	Switzerland
5	Slovakia
6	Czech Republic
7	Germany
8	United States
9	Ukraine
10	Belarus

Belarus is relegated to Division I for the 2001 IIHF World U18 Championships.

=== Scoring leaders ===
Player	Country	GP	G	A	Pts	PIM
Yegor Shastin	Russia	6	7	4	11	4
Sven Helfenstein	Switzerland	7	5	6	11	2
Jens Karlsson	Sweden	6	5	4	9	20
Marian Gaborik	Slovakia	6	6	2	8	12
Tuomo Ruutu	Finland	7	6	2	8	0
Martin Samuelsson	Sweden	6	3	5	8	6
Alexandr Svitov	Russia	6	3	5	8	8
Janne Jokila	Finland	7	3	5	8	8
Pavel Vorobiev	Russia	6	2	6	8	10
Thibaut Monnet	Switzerland	7	4	3	7	6

Source: IIHF

=== Goaltending leaders ===
(minimum 40% team's total ice time)

Player	Country	MINS	GA	Sv%	GAA	SO
Kari Lehtonen	Finland	307:11	9	96.30	1.76	1
Travis Weber	United States	150:39	2	96.00	0.80	1
Andrei Medvedev	Russia	180:00	4	95.60	1.33	0
Sergei Mylnikov	Russia	180:00	4	95.12	1.33	1
Henrik Lundqvist	Sweden	240:00	9	93.88	2.25	0

Source: IIHF

== Group B ==
=== First round ===
Group A
Pos	Team	Pld	W	D	L	GF	GA	GD	Pts	JPN	NOR	ITA	DEN
1	Japan	3	2	1	0	9	5	+4	5		3–2	3–3	3–0
2	Norway	3	2	0	1	19	8	+11	4	2–3		8–1	9–4
3	Italy	3	1	1	1	9	15	−6	3	3–3	1–8		5–4
4	Denmark	3	0	0	3	8	17	−9	0	0–3	4–9	4–5	

Source: IIHF

Group B
Pos	Team	Pld	W	D	L	GF	GA	GD	Pts	AUT	LAT	POL	FRA
1	Austria	3	2	1	0	14	8	+6	5		3–3	5–4	6–1
2	Latvia	3	1	2	0	12	10	+2	4	3–3		4–4	5–3
3	Poland	3	1	1	1	13	13	0	3	4–5	4–4		5–4
4	France	3	0	0	3	8	16	−8	0	1–6	3–5	4–5	

Source: IIHF

=== Final round ===
5th-8th place
Pos	Team	Pld	W	D	L	GF	GA	GD	Pts	DEN	ITA	POL	FRA
1	Denmark	3	2	0	1	18	12	+6	4		(4–5)	9–4	5–3
2	Italy	3	2	0	1	11	8	+3	4	(5–4)		2–3	4–1
3	Poland	3	2	0	1	12	15	−3	4	4–9	3–2		(5–4)
4	France	3	0	0	3	8	14	−6	0	3–5	1–4	(4–5)	

Source: IIHF

1st-4th place
Pos	Team	Pld	W	D	L	GF	GA	GD	Pts	NOR	AUT	LAT	JPN
1	Norway	3	2	0	1	10	7	+3	4		3–2	5–2	(2–3)
2	Austria	3	1	1	1	10	8	+2	3	2–3		(3–3)	5–2
3	Latvia	3	1	1	1	10	10	0	3	2–5	(3–3)		5–2
4	Japan	3	1	0	2	7	12	−5	2	(3–2)	2–5	2–5	

Source: IIHF

=== Final ranking ===
Rank	Team
1	Norway
2	Austria
3	Latvia
4	Japan
5	Denmark
6	Italy
7	Poland
8	France

== European Championships Division I ==
=== First round ===
Group A
Pos	Team	Pld	W	D	L	GF	GA	GD	Pts	EST	HUN	LTU	ESP
1	Estonia	3	3	0	0	21	7	+14	6		6–5	7–1	8–1
2	Hungary	3	2	0	1	24	13	+11	4	5–6		9–3	10–4
3	Lithuania	3	1	0	2	14	23	−9	2	1–7	3–9		10–7
4	Spain	3	0	0	3	12	28	−16	0	1–8	4–10	7–10	

Source: IIHF

Group B
Pos	Team	Pld	W	D	L	GF	GA	GD	Pts	KAZ	SLO	GBR	ROM
1	Kazakhstan	3	3	0	0	32	5	+27	6		6–4	8–0	18–1
2	Slovenia	3	2	0	1	21	9	+12	4	4–6		8–3	9–0
3	Great Britain	3	1	0	2	10	18	−8	2	0–8	3–8		7–2
4	Romania	3	0	0	3	3	34	−31	0	1–18	0–9	2–7	

Source: IIHF

=== Placing round ===
7th place
24 March 2000	Maribor	Romania	–	Spain	7:2 (2:0,4:1,1:1)
5th place
24 March 2000	Maribor	Great Britain	–	Lithuania	5:4 n.P. (1:2,2:1,1:1,0:0,1:0)
3rd place
24 March 2000	Maribor	Slovenia	–	Hungary	13:0 (4:0,4:0,5:0)
Final
24 March 2000	Maribor	Kazakhstan	–	Estonia	4:2 (1:1,2:1,1:0)

== European Championships Division II Qualification ==
=== Group A (in Reykjavík, Iceland) ===
26 November 1999	Reykjavík	Iceland	–	Ireland	13:2 (2:0,7:0,4:2)
27 November 1999	Reykjavík	Iceland	–	Ireland	12:3 (3:0,2:3,7:0)

=== Group B (in Sofia, Bulgaria) ===
4 March 2000	Sofia	South Africa	–	Turkey	3:1 (0:0,1:1,2:0)

== European Championships Division II ==
=== First round ===
Group A
Pos	Team	Pld	W	D	L	GF	GA	GD	Pts	CRO	BUL	LUX
1	Croatia	2	2	0	0	38	0	+38	4		18–0	20–0
2	Bulgaria	2	1	0	1	3	20	−17	2	0–18		3–2
3	Luxembourg	2	0	0	2	2	23	−21	0	0–20	2–3	

Source: IIHF

Group B
Pos	Team	Pld	W	D	L	GF	GA	GD	Pts	YUG	ISR	ISL
1	Yugoslavia	2	2	0	0	13	10	+3	4		8–6	5–4
2	Israel	2	1	0	1	10	10	0	2	6–8		4–2
3	Iceland	2	0	0	2	6	9	−3	0	4–5	2–4	

Source: IIHF

Group C
Pos	Team	Pld	W	D	L	GF	GA	GD	Pts	NED	BEL	RSA
1	Netherlands	2	2	0	0	12	3	+9	4		3–1	9–2
2	Belgium	2	1	0	1	8	4	+4	2	1–3		7–1
3	South Africa	2	0	0	2	3	16	−13	0	2–9	1–7	

Source: IIHF

=== Placing round ===
7th-9th place
Pos	Team	Pld	W	D	L	GF	GA	GD	Pts	RSA	LUX	ISL
1	South Africa	2	1	1	0	6	4	+2	3		3–1	3–3
2	Luxembourg	2	1	0	1	9	8	+1	2	1–3		8–5
3	Iceland	2	0	1	1	8	11	−3	1	3–3	5–8	

Source: IIHF

4th-6th place
Pos	Team	Pld	W	D	L	GF	GA	GD	Pts	BEL	ISR	BUL
1	Belgium	2	2	0	0	13	3	+10	4		5–3	8–0
2	Israel	2	1	0	1	10	9	+1	2	3–5		7–4
3	Bulgaria	2	0	0	2	4	15	−11	0	0–8	4–7	

Source: IIHF

1st-3rd place
Pos	Team	Pld	W	D	L	GF	GA	GD	Pts	CRO	NED	YUG
1	Croatia	2	2	0	0	19	6	+13	4		8–2	11–4
2	Netherlands	2	1	0	1	10	9	+1	2	2–8		8–1
3	Yugoslavia	2	0	0	2	5	19	−14	0	4–11	1–8	

Source: IIHF
