= Ice hockey at the 2015 European Youth Olympic Winter Festival =

2015 European Youth Olympic Winter Festival – Ice hockey

Tournament details
- Host country: Austria
- Venue(s): 1 (in 1 host city)
- Dates: 26–30 January 2015
- Teams: 6

Final positions
- Champions: Russia
- Runner-up: Czech Republic
- Third place: Finland
- Fourth place: Switzerland

Ice hockey at the 2015 European Youth Olympic Winter Festival was held at the Montafon Aktivpark in Schruns, Austria from 26 to 30 January 2015. Six countries participated in this event.

== Group stage ==
All times are local (UTC+1).

=== Group A ===
Team	GP	W	OTW	OTL	L	GF	GA	DIF	Pts
Czech Republic	2	2	0	0	0	11	3	+8	6
Switzerland	2	0	1	0	1	4	9	−5	2
Slovakia	2	0	0	1	1	2	5	-3	1

26 January 2015; 15:00	Czech Republic	8–2 (2–1, 4–0, 2–1)	Switzerland	Montafon Aktivpark; Attendance: 350

Game reference

27 January 2015; 15:00	Switzerland	2–1 OT (1–1, 0–0, 0–0) (OT: 1–0)	Slovakia	Montafon Aktivpark; Attendance: 800

Game reference

28 January 2015; 15:00	Slovakia	1–3 (0–2, 1–0, 0–1)	Czech Republic	Montafon Aktivpark; Attendance: 500

Game reference

== Group B ==
Team	GP	W	OTW	OTL	L	GF	GA	DIF	Pts
Russia	2	2	0	0	0	8	2	+6	6
Finland	2	1	0	0	1	12	4	+8	3
Austria	2	0	0	0	2	1	15	-14	0

26 January 2015; 18:30	Russia	3–2 (1–1, 1–0, 1–1)	Finland	Montafon Aktivpark; Attendance: 800

Game reference

27 January 2015; 18:30	Austria	0–5 (0–2, 0–3, 0–0)	Russia	Montafon Aktivpark; Attendance: 800

Game reference

28 January 2015; 18:30	Finland	10–1 (4–0, 2–0, 4–1)	Austria	Montafon Aktivpark; Attendance: 800

Game reference

== Knockout stage ==
=== Fifth place game ===
29 January 2015; 15:00	Slovakia	9–1 (3–0, 3–0, 3–1)	Austria	Montafon Aktivpark; Attendance: 800

Game reference

=== Bronze medal game ===
29 January 2015; 18:30	Switzerland	2–4 (1–2, 0–2, 1–0)	Finland	Montafon Aktivpark; Attendance: 800

Game reference

=== Final ===
30 January 2015; 15:00	Czech Republic	5–9 (1–2, 2–2, 2–5)	Russia	Montafon Aktivpark; Attendance: 1,500

Game reference
45 min	Penalties	37 min
40	Shots	37
