= Hyytiä =

Hyytiä is a Finnish surname. Notable people with the surname include:

- Ensio Hyytiä (1938–2019), Finnish ski jumper
- Mikko Hyytiä (born 1981), Finnish ice hockey player
