= 2002 World Ice Hockey Championships =

2002 World Ice Hockey Championships may refer to:

- 2002 Men's Ice Hockey World Championships
- 2002 World Junior Ice Hockey Championships
- 2002 IIHF World U18 Championships
