= France men's national under-18 ice hockey team =

France
- Nickname: Les Bleus (The Blues)
- Association: Fédération Française de Hockey sur Glace
- Team colors
- IIHF code: FRA

IIHF World U18 Championship
- Appearances: 1 (first in 2018)

The France men's national under-18 ice hockey team is the men's national under-18 ice hockey team of France. The team is controlled by the French Ice Hockey Federation, a member of the International Ice Hockey Federation. The team represents France at the IIHF World U18 Championships.

== International competitions ==
=== IIHF World U18 Championships ===
- 1999: 6th in Pool B
- 2000: 8th in Pool B
- 2001: 2nd in Division II
- 2002: 1st in Division II
- 2003: 4th in Division I Group B
- 2004: 5th in Division I Group B
- 2005: 4th in Division I Group A
- 2006: 4th in Division I Group A
- 2007: 6th in Division I Group A
- 2008: 1st in Division II Group A
- 2009: 4th in Division I Group B
- 2010: 4th in Division I Group A
- 2011: 3rd in Division I Group B
- 2012: 4th in Division IA
- 2013: 5th in Division IA
- 2014: 5th in Division IA
- 2015: 3rd in Division IA
- 2016: 4th in Division IA
- 2017: 1st in Division IA
- 2018: 10th
- 2019: 5th in Division IA
- 2020: Cancelled due to the COVID-19 pandemic
- 2021: Cancelled due to the COVID-19 pandemic
- 2022: 3rd in Division IA
- 2023: 6th in Division IA
- 2024: 4th in Division I Group B
