= Ukraine men's national under-18 ice hockey team =

The Ukraine men's national under-18 ice hockey team is the men's national under-18 ice hockey team of Ukraine. The team is controlled by the Ice Hockey Federation of Ukraine, a member of the International Ice Hockey Federation. The team represents Ukraine at the IIHF World U18 Championships.

== International competitions ==
=== IIHF World U18 Championships ===
- 1999: 8th place
- 2000: 9th place
- 2001: 10th place
- 2002: 12th place
- 2003: 6th in Division I Group B
- 2004: 1st in Division II Group B
- 2005: 3rd in Division I Group B
- 2006: 5th in Division I Group B
- 2007: 5th in Division I Group B
- 2008: 5th in Division I Group A
- 2009: 6th in Division I Group A
- 2010: 2nd in Division II Group B
- 2011: 1st in Division II Group B
- 2012: 4th in Division IB
- 2013: 5th in Division IB
- 2014: 5th in Division IB
- 2015: 4th in Division IB
- 2016: 3rd in Division IB
- 2017: 5th in Division IB
- 2018: 1st in Division IB
- 2019: 5th in Division IA
- 2020: Cancelled due to the COVID-19 pandemic
- 2021: Cancelled due to the COVID-19 pandemic
- 2022: 2nd in Division IB
- 2023: 5th in Division IA
- 2024: 2nd in Division IA
- 2025: 2nd in Division IA
- 2026: 3rd in Division IA
