= Italy men's national under-18 ice hockey team =

Italy
- Nickname: Gli Azzurrini (The Little Blues)
- Association: Federazione Italiana Sport del Ghiaccio
- Team colors
- IIHF code: ITA
Home colours	Away colours

Ranking
- Current IIHF: 18
- Highest IIHF: 13 (2007)
- Lowest IIHF: 19 (first in 2004)

Biggest defeat
- Finland 28–0 Italy (Tychy, Poland; 1 April 1979)

The Italy men's national under-18 ice hockey team is the men's national under-18 ice hockey team of Italy. The team is controlled by the Federazione Italiana Sport del Ghiaccio, a member of the International Ice Hockey Federation. The team represents Italy at the IIHF World U18 Championships.

== International competitions ==
=== IIHF World U18 Championships ===
- 1999: 5th in Pool B
- 2000: 6th in Pool B
- 2001: 6th in Division I
- 2002: 5th in Division I
- 2003:: 3rd in Division I Group B
- 2004: 3rd in Division I Group B
- 2005: 6th in Division I Group B
- 2006: 1st in Division I Group A
- 2007: 4th in Division I Group A
- 2008: 4th in Division I Group B
- 2009: 6th in Division I Group B
- 2010: 1st in Division I Group A
- 2011: 2nd in Division I Group A
- 2012: 3rd in Division IA
- 2013: 3rd in Division IA
- 2014: 6th in Division IA
- 2015: 5th in Division IB
- 2016: 5th in Division IB
- 2017: 4th in Division IB
- 2018: 5th in Division IB
- 2019: 4th in Division IB
- 2020: Cancelled due to the COVID-19 pandemic
- 2021: Cancelled due to the COVID-19 pandemic
- 2022: 3rd in Division IB
- 2023: 3rd in Division IB
- 2024: 6th in Division IB
- 2025: 1st in Division IIA
- 2026: 1st in Division IB
