= Mikko Hyytiä =

Finnish ice hockey player

- Born: July 12, 1981 (age 45) Jyväskylä, Finland
- Height: 6 ft 0 in (183 cm)
- Weight: 194 lb (88 kg; 13 st 12 lb)
- Position: Centre
- Shot: Left
- Played for: JYP Jyväskylä ( SM-liiga)
- NHL draft: 225th overall, 1999; Montreal Canadiens
- Playing career: 2000–2001

Mikko Hyytiä (born July 12, 1981) is a Finnish professional ice hockey player who played with JYP Jyväskylä in the SM-liiga during the 2000–01 season. He was selected by the Montreal Canadiens in the 8th round (225th overall) of the 1999 NHL entry draft.

== Awards and honours ==
Award	Year
IIHF World U18 Championships All-Star Team	1999
