= Norway men's national under-18 ice hockey team =

National under-18 men's ice hockey team located in Norway

The Norway men's national under-18 ice hockey team is the men's national under-18 ice hockey team of Norway. The team is controlled by the Norwegian Ice Hockey Association, a member of the International Ice Hockey Federation. The team represents Norway at the IIHF World U18 Championships.

== International competitions ==
=== IIHF European U18 / U19 Championships ===
Tournament	Rank
(Austria) 1970 Kapfenberg / Leoben / Bruck	(1st in Group B)
(Czechoslovakia) 1971 Prešov, Slovak SR	6th
(Sweden) 1972 Boden / Luleå / Skellefteå	6th
(Netherlands) 1973	(7th in Group B)
(Romania) 1974 Bucharest	(4th in Group B)
(Switzerland) 1975 Herisau	(5th in Group B)
(Romania) 1976 Bucharest / Ploiești	(4th in Group B)
(Spain) 1977 Bilbao / San Sebastián	(1st in Group B)
(Finland) 1978 Helsinki / Vantaa	8th
(Romania) 1979 Miercurea Ciuc	(1st in Group B)
(Czechoslovakia) 1980 Brno / Hradec Králové, Czech SR	8th
(Romania) 1981 Miercurea Ciuc	(2nd in Group B)
(Bulgaria) 1982 Sofia	(1st in Group B)
(Norway) 1983 Oslo	8th
(Denmark) 1984 Herning	(1st in Group B)
(France) 1985 Anglet	4th
(West Germany) 1986 Düsseldorf / Ratingen / Krefeld / North Rhine-Westphalia	7th
(Finland) 1987 Tampere / Kouvola / Hämeenlinna	7th
(Czechoslovakia) 1988 Frýdek-Místek / Vsetín / Olomouc / Přerov, Czech SR	5th
(Soviet Union) 1989 Kiev, Ukrainian SSR	7th
(Sweden) 1990 Örnsköldsvik / Sollefteå	5th
(Czechoslovakia) 1991 Spišská Nová Ves / Prešov, Slovak SR	6th
(Norway) 1992 Lillehammer / Hamar	7th
(Poland) 1993 Nowy Targ / Oswiecim	5th
(Finland) 1994 Jyväskylä	7th
(Germany) 1995 Berlin	8th
(Poland) 1996 Tychy / Sosnowiec	(4th in Group B)
(Slovenia) 1997 Maribor / Celje	(1st in Group B)
(Sweden) 1998 Malung / Mora	7th

=== IIHF World U18 Championships ===
Tournament	Rank
(Germany) 1999 Füssen / Kaufbeuren	10th
(Switzerland) 2000 Kloten / Weinfelden	(1st in Group B)
(Finland) 2001 Heinola / Helsinki / Lahti	9th
(Slovakia) 2002 Piešťany / Trnava	11th
(France) 2003 Briançon	(1st in Division I Group B)
(Belarus) 2004 Minsk	10th
(Poland) 2005 Sosnowiec	(1st in Division I Group B)
(Sweden) 2006 Ängelholm / Halmstad	10th
(Poland) 2007 Sanok	(3rd in Division I Group B)
(Latvia) 2008 Riga	(1st in Division I Group B)
(United States) 2009 Fargo	9th
(Denmark) 2010 Herning	(1st in Division I Group A)
(Germany) 2011 Crimmitschau / Dresden	9th
(Slovakia) 2012 Piešťany	(2nd in Division I Group A)
(Italy) 2013 Asiago	(2nd in Division I Group A)
(France) 2014 Nice	(2nd in Division I Group A)
(Hungary) 2015 Debrecen	(4th in Division I Group A)
(Belarus) 2016 Minsk	(5th in Division I Group A)
(Slovenia) 2017 Bled	(4th in Division I Group A)
(Latvia) 2018 Riga	(5th in Division I Group A)
(France) 2019 Grenoble	(4th in Division I Group A)
(Slovakia) 2020 Spišská Nová Ves	Cancelled (Division I Group A)
(Slovakia) 2021 Spišská Nová Ves	Cancelled (Division I Group A)
(Slovakia) 2022 Piešťany	(2nd in Division I Group A)
(Switzerland) 2023 Basel / Porrentruy	9th
(Finland) 2024 Espoo / Vantaa	9th
(United States) 2025 Frisco / Allen	9th
(Slovakia) 2026 Trenčín / Bratislava	9th
