= 2002 IIHF World U18 Championships =

2002 IIHF World U18 Championship

Tournament details
- Host country: Slovakia
- Venues: 2 (in 2 host cities)
- Dates: April 11–21, 2002
- Teams: 12

Final positions
- Champions: United States (1st title)
- Runners-up: Russia
- Third place: Czech Republic
- Fourth place: Finland

Tournament statistics
- Games played: 48
- Goals scored: 328 (6.83 per game)
- Attendance: 93,914 (1,957 per game)
- Scoring leader: (Russia) Alexander Ovechkin (18 points)

The 2002 IIHF World U18 Championships were held in Piešťany and Trnava, Slovakia. The championships began on April 11, 2002, and finished on April 21, 2002. Games were played at Zimny Stadion in Piešťany and Zimny Stadion in Trnava. The United States finished first in the final round to capture the gold, while Russia and the Czech Republic captured the silver and bronze medal respectively. USA and Russia played the last game of the final round to determine the medals. Needing to beat Russia by two goals, USA led 2–1 with a minute remaining. They pulled their goalie, leading to Zach Parise's gold medal-winning goal with thirty seconds remaining.

== Championship results ==
=== Preliminary round ===
==== Group A ====
Pos	Team	Pld	W	L	D	GF	GA	GD	Pts
1	Russia	5	5	0	0	34	10	+24	10
2	Czech Republic	5	4	1	0	25	12	+13	8
3	Canada	5	3	2	0	21	17	+4	6
4	Norway	5	1	3	1	13	23	−10	3
5	Slovakia	5	1	4	0	10	19	−9	2
6	Germany	5	0	4	1	7	29	−22	1

Source: IIHF

Results

11 April 2002; 13:00	Norway	2–2 (0–1, 2–1, 0–0)	Germany

11 April 2002; 16:30	Slovakia	1–5 (0–2, 0–2, 1–1)	Czech Republic

11 April 2002; 20:00	Canada	4–8 (3–2, 1–2, 0–4)	Russia

12 April 2002; 13:00	Czech Republic	7–4 (2–1, 2–2, 3–1)	Norway

12 April 2002; 16:30	Russia	6–1 (2–0, 2–1, 2–0)	Slovakia

12 April 2002; 20:00	Germany	1–9 (0–2, 1–3, 0–4)	Canada

14 April 2002; 13:00	Czech Republic	6–1 (4–0, 2–1, 0–0)	Germany

14 April 2002; 16:30	Canada	3–1 (2–0, 1–1, 0–0)	Slovakia

14 April 2002; 20:00	Russia	7–0 (1–0, 2–0, 4–0)	Norway

15 April 2002; 13:00	Czech Republic	4–1 (0–1, 1–0, 3–0)	Canada

15 April 2002; 16:30	Slovakia	3–4 (2–2, 0–0, 1–2)	Norway

15 April 2002; 20:00	Germany	2–8 (2–2, 0–3, 0–3)	Russia

17 April 2002; 10:00	Norway	3–4 (2–2, 0–0, 1–2)	Canada

17 April 2002; 13:30	Russia	5–3 (1–2, 3–0, 1–1)	Czech Republic

17 April 2002; 17:00	Germany	1–4 (1–2, 0–1, 0–1)	Slovakia

==== Group B ====
Pos	Team	Pld	W	L	D	GF	GA	GD	Pts
1	United States	5	5	0	0	33	5	+28	10
2	Finland	5	4	1	0	22	7	+15	8
3	Belarus	5	2	3	0	14	21	−7	4
4	Sweden	5	2	3	0	16	16	0	4
5	Switzerland	5	2	3	0	18	21	−3	4
6	Ukraine	5	0	5	0	4	37	−33	0

Source: IIHF

Results

11 April 2002; 13:00	Belarus	0–9 (0–2, 0–1, 0–6)	United States

11 April 2002; 16:30	Sweden	0–2 (0–0, 0–1, 0–1)	Finland

11 April 2002; 20:00	Ukraine	0–10 (0–4, 0–2, 0–4)	Switzerland

12 April 2002; 13:00	Finland	4–3 (1–0, 1–1, 2–2)	Belarus

12 April 2002; 16:30	Switzerland	3–2 (2–1, 0–1, 1–0)	Sweden

12 April 2002; 20:00	United States	10–0 (2–0, 3–0, 5–0)	Ukraine

14 April 2002; 13:00	Ukraine	3–8 (1–3, 2–3, 0–2)	Sweden

14 April 2002; 16:30	Switzerland	3–6 (1–1, 1–1, 1–4)	Belarus

14 April 2002; 20:00	Finland	2–3 (1–1, 0–0, 1–2)	United States

15 April 2002; 13:00	Sweden	4–2 (1–1, 1–0, 2–1)	Belarus

15 April 2002; 16:30	Finland	6–0 (0–0, 3–0, 3–0)	Ukraine

15 April 2002; 20:00	United States	5–1 (2–1, 2–0, 1–0)	Switzerland

17 April 2002; 10:00	Belarus	3–1 (2–1, 1–0, 0–0)	Ukraine

17 April 2002; 13:30	United States	6–2 (1–0, 1–1, 4–1)	Sweden

17 April 2002; 17:00	Switzerland	1–8 (1–3, 0–2, 0–3)	Finland

=== Relegation Round ===
Pos	Team	Pld	W	L	D	GF	GA	GD	Pts
1	Switzerland	5	5	0	0	28	6	+22	10
2	Slovakia	5	3	2	0	15	11	+4	6
3	Sweden	5	3	2	0	20	13	+7	6
4	Germany	5	1	3	1	9	16	−7	3
5	Norway	5	1	3	1	12	20	−8	3
6	Ukraine	5	1	4	0	9	27	−18	2

Source: IIHF

Note: The following matches from the preliminary round carry forward to the relegation round:

- April 11, 2004: Norway 2–2 Germany
- April 11, 2004: Ukraine 0–10 Switzerland
- April 12, 2004: Switzerland 3–2 Sweden
- April 14, 2004: Ukraine 3–8 Sweden
- April 15, 2004: Slovakia 3–4 Norway
- April 17, 2004: Germany 1–4 Slovakia

Results

18 April 2002; 13:00	Sweden	4–0 (2–0, 0–0, 2–0)	Germany

18 April 2002; 16:30	Norway	2–7 (0–3, 1–3, 1–1)	Switzerland

18 April 2002; 20:00	Slovakia	3–0 (2–0, 1–0, 0–0)	Ukraine

20 April 2002; 11:00	Switzerland	5–2 (0–1, 2–1, 3–0)	Germany

20 April 2002; 14:30	Ukraine	5–2 (1–1, 2–0, 2–1)	Norway

20 April 2002; 18:00	Sweden	3–5 (1–3, 2–1, 0–1)	Slovakia

21 April 2002; 11:00	Germany	4–1 (1–0, 3–0, 0–1)	Ukraine

21 April 2002; 14:30	Slovakia	0–3 (0–0, 0–3, 0–0)	Switzerland

21 April 2002; 18:00	Norway	2–3 (0–1, 2–1, 0–1)	Sweden

=== Final round ===
Pos	Team	Pld	W	L	D	GF	GA	GD	Pts
1	United States	5	4	1	0	27	7	+20	8
2	Russia	5	4	1	0	29	13	+16	8
3	Czech Republic	5	4	1	0	17	9	+8	8
4	Finland	5	2	3	0	14	15	−1	4
5	Belarus	5	1	4	0	9	32	−23	2
6	Canada	5	0	5	0	12	30	−18	0

Source: IIHF

Note: The following matches from the preliminary round carry forward to the final round:

- April 11, 2004: Belarus 0–9 United States
- April 11, 2004: Canada 4–8 Russia
- April 12, 2004: Finland 4–3 Belarus
- April 14, 2004: Finland 2–3 United States
- April 15, 2004: Czech Republic 4–1 Canada
- April 17, 2004: Russia 5–3 Czech Republic

Results

18 April 2002; 13:00	Czech Republic	5–1 (1–0, 2–1, 2–0)	Belarus

18 April 2002; 16:30	United States	10–3 (2–1, 5–2, 3–0)	Canada

18 April 2002; 20:00	Russia	4–3 (2–2, 1–1, 1–0)	Finland

20 April 2002; 12:00	Finland	3–1 (0–1, 1–0, 2–0)	Canada

20 April 2002; 15:30	United States	0–1 (0–0, 0–1, 0–0)	Czech Republic

20 April 2002; 19:00	Belarus	0–11 (0–2, 0–7, 0–2)	Russia

21 April 2002; 12:00	Czech Republic	4–2 (1–0, 1–1, 2–1)	Finland

21 April 2002; 15:30	Canada	3–5 (1–3, 2–0, 0–2)	Belarus

21 April 2002; 19:00	Russia	1–3 (0–2, 0–0, 1–1)	United States

=== Final standings ===
Rk.	Team
1st place, gold medalist(s)	United States
2nd place, silver medalist(s)	Russia
3rd place, bronze medalist(s)	Czech Republic
4	Finland
5	Belarus
6	Canada
7	Switzerland
8	Slovakia
9	Sweden
10	Germany
11	Norway
12	Ukraine

Germany, Norway, and Ukraine are relegated to Division I for the 2003 IIHF World U18 Championships.

== Division I ==
The Division I tournament was played in Celje and Maribor, Slovenia, from 23 to 29 March 2002. With the temporary expansion of the top level to twelve teams because of the late inclusion of Canada, Division I was left short one team. France, the previous year's runner up in Division II was invited, but failed to respond, so the tournament was played with only seven teams.

=== First round ===
Group A (in Celje)
Pos	Team	Pld	W	D	L	GF	GA	GD	Pts	KAZ	AUT	ITA
1	Kazakhstan	2	2	0	0	12	2	+10	4		6–1	6–1
2	Austria	2	1	0	1	4	7	−3	2	1–6		3–1
3	Italy	2	0	0	2	2	9	−7	0	1–6	1–3	

Source: IIHF

Group B (in Maribor)
Pos	Team	Pld	W	D	L	GF	GA	GD	Pts	SLO	LAT	DAN	JPN
1	Slovenia	3	2	1	0	11	6	+5	5		4–2	3–0	4–4
2	Latvia	3	1	1	1	8	8	0	3	2–4		4–2	2–2
3	Denmark	3	1	0	2	8	11	−3	2	0–3	2–4		6–4
4	Japan	3	0	2	1	10	12	−2	2	4–4	2–2	4–6	

Source: IIHF

=== Consolation round (Places 5–7) ===
(in Celje)
Pos	Team	Pld	W	D	L	GF	GA	GD	Pts	ITA	DAN	JPN
1	Italy	2	1	0	1	7	6	+1	2		4–2	3–4
2	Denmark	2	1	0	1	8	8	0	2	2–4		(6–4)
3	Japan	2	1	0	1	8	9	−1	2	4–3	(4–6)	

Source: IIHF

=== Play-off ===
Results

27 March 2002; 15:30	Kazakhstan	4–1 (1–1, 3–0, 0–0)	Latvia

27 March 2002; 19:00	Slovenia	3 – 2 OT (0–1, 1–1, 1–0) (1–0)	Austria

29 March 2002; 15:30	Latvia	1–4 (1–1, 0–2, 0–1)	Austria

29 March 2002; 19:00	Slovenia	2–5 (1–0, 1–3, 0–2)	Kazakhstan

Kazakhstan were promoted to the top level, and no team was relegated for the 2003 IIHF World U18 Championships.

== Division II ==
The Division II tournament was played in Briançon, France, from 22 to 29 March 2002. With North Korea's absence, Romania (the previous year's Division III runners-up) gained a late promotion into this tournament.

=== First round ===
Group A
Pos	Team	Pld	W	D	L	GF	GA	GD	Pts	FRA	GBR	CRO	ROM
1	France	3	3	0	0	47	1	+46	6		10–0	17–1	20–0
2	Great Britain	3	2	0	1	16	11	+5	4	0–10		8–1	8–0
3	Croatia	3	1	0	2	9	27	−18	2	1–17	1–8		7–2
4	Romania	3	0	0	3	2	35	−33	0	0–20	0–8	2–7	

Source: IIHF

Group B
Pos	Team	Pld	W	D	L	GF	GA	GD	Pts	POL	EST	NED	HUN
1	Poland	3	3	0	0	25	3	+22	6		9–1	9–1	7–1
2	Estonia	3	2	0	1	13	11	+2	4	1–9		7–0	5–2
3	Netherlands	3	1	0	2	4	18	−14	2	1–9	0–7		3–2
4	Hungary	3	0	0	3	5	15	−10	0	1–7	2–5	2–3	

Source: IIHF

=== Play-off round and Consolation round ===
Pos	Team	Pld	W	D	L	GF	GA	GD	Pts	FRA	POL	GBR	EST
1	France	3	3	0	0	36	1	+35	6		12–1	(10–0)	14–0
2	Poland	3	2	0	1	20	15	+5	4	1–12		10–2	(9–1)
3	Great Britain	3	1	0	2	10	22	−12	2	(0–10)	2–10		8–2
4	Estonia	3	0	0	3	3	31	−28	0	0–14	(1–9)	2–8	

Source: IIHF

Pos	Team	Pld	W	D	L	GF	GA	GD	Pts	NED	HUN	CRO	ROM
1	Netherlands	3	3	0	0	12	7	+5	6		(3–2)	6–3	3–2
2	Hungary	3	2	0	1	13	7	+6	4	(2–3)		6–2	5–2
3	Croatia	3	1	0	2	12	14	−2	2	3–6	2–6		(7–2)
4	Romania	3	0	0	3	6	15	−9	0	2–3	2–5	(2–7)	

Source: IIHF

With the forthcoming reorganization into twelve team divisions, France, Poland, and Great Britain were all promoted to Division I, and no team was relegated for the 2003 IIHF World U18 Championships.

== Division III ==
The Division III tournament was played in Elektrėnai and Kaunas, Lithuania, from 5 to 9 March 2002.

=== First round ===
Group A (in Elektrėnai)
Pos	Team	Pld	W	D	L	GF	GA	GD	Pts	KOR	BEL	LTU	BUL
1	South Korea	3	3	0	0	36	1	+35	6		14–1	11–0	11–0
2	Belgium	3	2	0	1	11	19	−8	4	1–14		6–4	4–1
3	Lithuania	3	1	0	2	11	18	−7	2	0–11	4–6		7–1
4	Bulgaria	3	0	0	3	2	22	−20	0	0–11	1–4	1–7	

Source: IIHF

Group B (in Kaunas)
Pos	Team	Pld	W	D	L	GF	GA	GD	Pts	YUG	ESP	RSA	TUR
1	Yugoslavia	3	3	0	0	42	5	+37	6		6–3	20–2	16–0
2	Spain	3	1	1	1	27	12	+15	3	3–6		4–4	20–2
3	South Africa	3	1	1	1	11	25	−14	3	2–20	4–4		5–1
4	Turkey	3	0	0	3	3	41	−38	0	0–16	2–20	1–5	

Source: IIHF

With the forthcoming reorganization into twelve team divisions, everyone but Turkey were promoted to Division II, and no team was relegated for the 2003 IIHF World U18 Championships.

=== Play-off round ===
Results

9 March 2002; 14:00	Bulgaria	6–3 (2–1, 3–0, 1–2)	Turkey	Kaunas

9 March 2002; 18:00	Lithuania	3–5 (3–0, 0–3, 0–2)	South Africa	Kaunas

9 March 2002; 14:00	Belgium	4–7 (0–1, 2–4, 2–2)	Spain	Elektrėnai

9 March 2002; 18:00	South Korea	11–1 (3–1, 4–0, 4–0)	Yugoslavia	Elektrėnai

== See also ==
- 2002 World Junior Championships
