= Slovenia men's national under-18 ice hockey team =

The Slovenia men's national under-18 ice hockey team is the men's national under-18 ice hockey team of Slovenia. The team is controlled by the Ice Hockey Federation of Slovenia, which is a member of the International Ice Hockey Federation. The team represents Slovenia at the IIHF World U18 Championships.

== International competitions ==
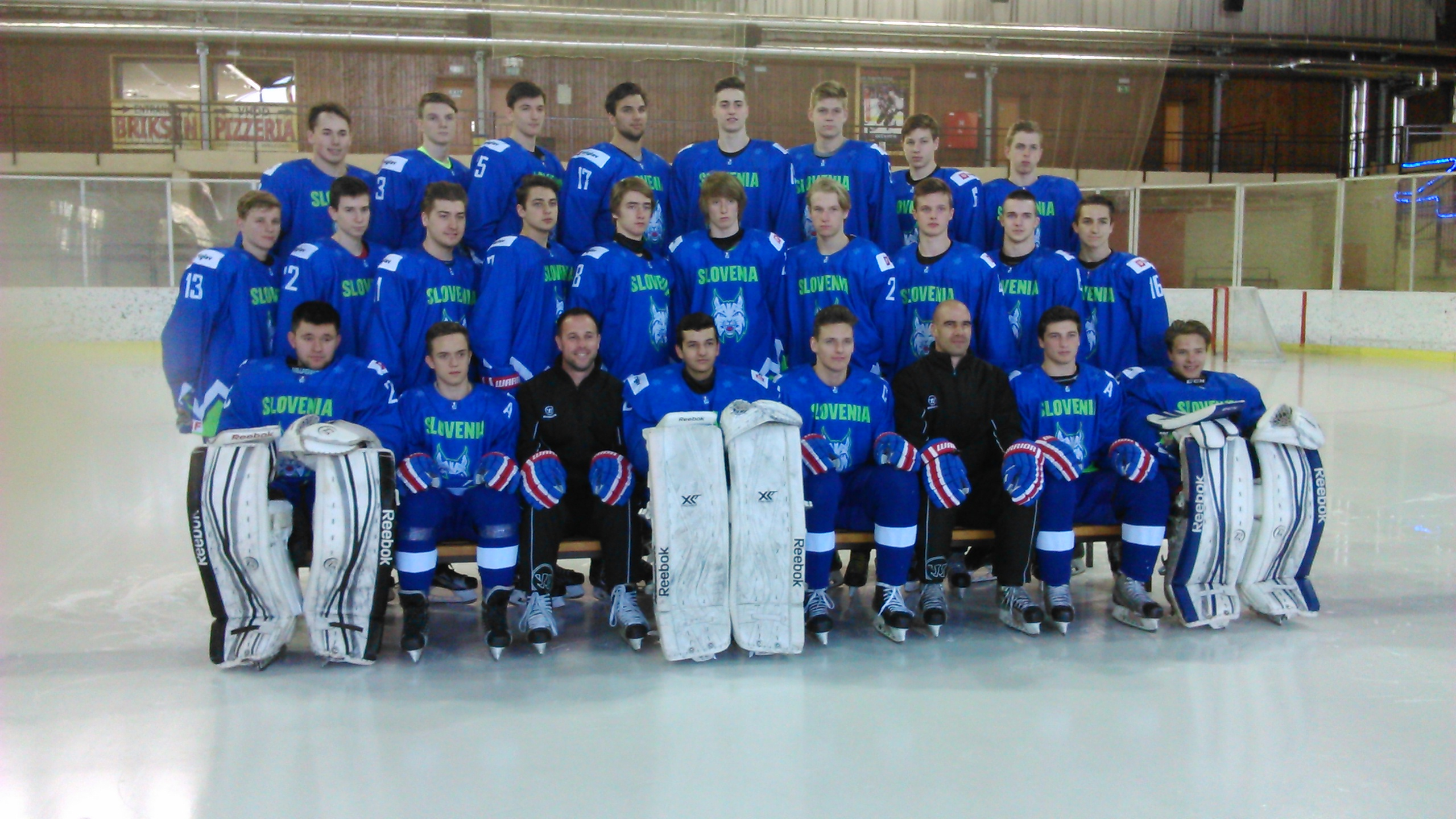
The Slovenian under-18 team in 2016

=== IIHF World U18 Championships ===
- 1999: 2nd in Division I Europe
- 2000: 3rd in Division I Europe
- 2001: 1st in Division II
- 2002: 2nd in Division I
- 2003: 3rd in Division I Group A
- 2004: 2nd in Division I Group A
- 2005: 2nd in Division I Group A
- 2006: 2nd in Division I Group A
- 2007: 2nd in Division I Group A
- 2008: 6th in Division I Group A
- 2009: 2nd in Division I Group A
- 2010: 1st in Division I Group B
- 2011: 2nd in Division I Group B
- 2012: 5th in Division IA
- 2013: 6th in Division IA
- 2014: 3rd in Division IB
- 2015: 2nd in Division IB
- 2016: 4th in Division IA
- 2017: 1st in Division IB
- 2018: 6th in Division IA
- 2019: 5th in Division IB
- 2020: Cancelled due to the COVID-19 pandemic
- 2021: Cancelled due to the COVID-19 pandemic
- 2022: 4th in Division IB
- 2023: 2nd in Division IB
- 2024: 1st in Division IB
- 2025: 4th in Division IA
