= Belarus men's national under-18 ice hockey team =

The Belarus men's national under-18 ice hockey team is the men's national under-18 ice hockey team of Belarus. The team is controlled by the Belarus Ice Hockey Federation, a member of the International Ice Hockey Federation. The team represented Belarus at the IIHF World U18 Championships.

Due to the 2022 Russian invasion of Ukraine, the International Ice Hockey Federation banned all Belarusian national and club teams from its events indefinitely, and Hockey Canada banned Belarus’s “participation in events held in Canada that do not fall under the IIHF’s jurisdiction.”

== International competitions ==
=== IIHF World U18 Championships ===
- 1999: 11th (1st in Division I)
- 2000: 10th
- 2001: 11th (1st in Division I)
- 2002: 5th
- 2003: 8th
- 2004: 9th
- 2005: 11th (1st in Division I)
- 2006: 9th
- 2007: 12th (2nd in Division I)
- 2008: 9th
- 2009: 11th (1st in Division I)
- 2010: 10th
- 2011: 17th (7th in Division I)
- 2012: 17th (1st in Division IB)
- 2013: 14th (4th in Division IA)
- 2014: 14th (4th in Division IA)
- 2015: 12th (2nd in Division IA)
- 2016: 11th (1st in Division IA)
- 2017: 9th
- 2018: 8th
- 2019: 5th
- 2020: Cancelled due to the COVID-19 pandemic
- 2021: 6th
- 2022: Expelled
- 2023: Expelled
- 2024: Expelled
- 2025: Expelled
- 2026: Expelled
- 2027:

== WJC U18 Championship Record (1999–2021) ==
Opponent	Pld	W	OTW	D	OTL	L	GF	GA
United States	9	0	0	1	0	8	8	69
Kazakhstan	8	7	1	0	0	0	42	22
Sweden	8	0	0	0	0	8	13	42
France	7	5	0	0	1	1	37	12
Latvia	7	4	0	0	1	2	26	17
Switzerland	7	4	0	0	1	2	31	23
Denmark	7	3	0	0	2	2	36	26
Finland	7	1	0	0	0	6	21	40
Austria	6	3	0	2	0	1	27	14
Norway	6	2	1	1	1	1	26	25
Canada	6	1	0	0	0	5	16	45
Slovakia	5	1	0	0	0	4	7	26
Russia	5	0	0	0	0	5	2	46
Poland	4	3	0	1	0	0	22	5
Slovenia	4	3	0	0	0	1	20	12
Ukraine	4	3	0	0	0	1	18	10
Italy	4	2	1	0	0	1	14	11
Czech Republic	4	0	0	0	0	4	11	20
Hungary	3	2	1	0	0	0	15	8
Germany	3	1	0	0	0	2	6	18
Great Britain	2	2	0	0	0	0	13	1
North Korea	1	1	0	0	0	0	9	1
South Korea	1	1	0	0	0	0	8	0
Lithuania	1	1	0	0	0	0	3	0
Japan	1	1	0	0	0	0	3	2
Total:	120	52	4	5	6	53	434	491
