= Poland men's national under-18 ice hockey team =

The Poland men's national under-18 ice hockey team is the men's national under-18 ice hockey team of Poland. The team is controlled by the Polish Ice Hockey Federation, a member of the International Ice Hockey Federation. The team represents Poland at the IIHF World U18 Championships.

Poland hosted the 1996 IIHF European U18 Championship in Sosnowiec and Tychy. Polish player Leszek Laszkiewicz was the leading scorer in Group B, with nine goals and 13 points he was named to the event's all-star team.

== International competitions ==
=== IIHF European Junior Championships ===
- 1977: 7th in Group A
- 1978: 5th in Group A
- 1979: 5th in Group A
- 1980: 6th in Group A
- 1981: 6th in Group A
- 1982: withdrew from Group A
- 1983: 6th in Group B
- 1984: 2nd in Group B
- 1985: 2nd in Group B
- 1986: 1st in Group B
- 1987: 6th in Group A
- 1988: 7th in Group A
- 1989: 1st in Group B
- 1990: 6th in Group A
- 1991: 7th in Group A
- 1992: 6th in Group A
- 1993: 7th in Group A
- 1994: 8th in Group A
- 1995: 2nd in Group B
- 1996: 5th in Group B
- 1997: 2nd in Group B
- 1998: 3rd in Group B

=== IIHF World U18 Championships ===
- 1999: 3rd in Pool B
- 2000: 7th in Pool B
- 2001: 3rd in Division II
- 2002: 2nd in Division II
- 2003: 2nd in Division I Group B
- 2004: 5th in Division I Group A
- 2005: 4th in Division I Group B
- 2006: 4th in Division I Group B
- 2007: 4th in Division I Group A
- 2008: 4th in Division I Group A
- 2009: 2nd in Division I Group A
- 2010: 3rd in Division I Group B
- 2011: 5th in Division I Group B
- 2012: 5th in Division IB
- 2013: 4th in Division IB
- 2014: 6th in Division IB
- 2015: 2nd in Division IIA
- 2016: 1st in Division IIA
- 2017: 6th in Division IB
- 2018: 3rd in Division IIA
- 2019: 1st in Division IIA
- 2020: Cancelled due to the COVID-19 pandemic
- 2021: Cancelled due to the COVID-19 pandemic
- 2022: 6th in Division IB
- 2023: 6th in Division IB
- 2024: 1st in Division IIA
- 2025: 1st in Division I Group B
- 2026: 6th in Division I Group A
