= Germany men's national under-18 ice hockey team =

Germany
- Nickname: Träger der Adler (Bearers of the Eagle)
- Association: Deutscher Eishockey-Bund
- Team colors
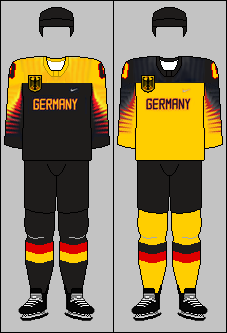

First international
- Germany 2–10 Soviet Union (Füssen, West Germany; 26 December 1969)

IIHF World U18 Championship
- Appearances: 23 (first in 1999)

The Germany men's national under-18 ice hockey team is the men's national under-18 ice hockey team of Germany. The team is controlled by the German Ice Hockey Federation, a member of the International Ice Hockey Federation. The team represents Germany at the IIHF World U18 Championships.

== International competitions ==
=== IIHF European U18/U19 Championships ===
- 1968: Forfeited qualification games
- 1969: 5th place
- 1970: 5th place
- 1971: 5th place
- 1972: 5th place
- 1973: 6th place
- 1974: 1st in Group B
- 1975: 6th place
- 1976: 5th place
- 1977: 6th place
- 1978: 7th place
- 1979: 7th place
- 1980: 5th place
- 1981: 7th place
- 1982: 6th place
- 1983: 5th place
- 1984: 5th place
- 1985: 6th place
- 1986: 5th place
- 1987: 8th place
- 1988: 1st in Group B
- 1989: 5th place
- 1990: 7th place
- 1991: 5th place
- 1992: 5th place
- 1993: 6th place
- 1994: 6th place
- 1995: (silver) 2nd place
- 1996: 6th place
- 1997: 8th place
- 1998: 1st in Group B

=== IIHF World U18 Championships ===
- 1999: 9th place
- 2000: 7th place
- 2001: 5th place
- 2002: 10th place
- 2003: 2nd in Division I Group A
- 2004: 1st in Division I Group B
- 2005: 8th place
- 2006: 8th place
- 2007: 8th place
- 2008: 5th place
- 2009: 10th place
- 2010: 1st in Division I Group B
- 2011: 6th place
- 2012: 6th place
- 2013: 8th place
- 2014: 9th place
- 2015: 10th place
- 2016: 2nd in Division I Group A
- 2017: 5th in Division I Group A
- 2018: 2nd in Division I Group A
- 2019: 1st in Division I Group A
- 2020: Cancelled due to the COVID-19 pandemic
- 2021: 10th place
- 2022: 8th place
- 2023: 10th place
- 2024: 1st in Division I Group A
- 2025: 6th place
- 2026: 10th place
