= Latvia men's national under-18 ice hockey team =

The Latvia men's national under-18 ice hockey team is the men's national under-18 ice hockey team of Latvia. The team is controlled by the Latvian Ice Hockey Federation, a member of the International Ice Hockey Federation. The team represents Latvia at the IIHF World U18 Championships. Latvia's best appearance at the IIHF World U18 Championships is in 2026, where Latvia won USA in quarter-finals with a result of 5-2 sending Latvia to semi-finals. Latvia did lose to Slovakia in the semi-finals with a result of 0-1, sending Slovakia to gold medal game, but Latvia to bronze medal game. Latvia played against Czechia in bronze medal game and did lose with result of 4-1 claiming fourth place.

== International competitions ==
=== IIHF World U18 Championships ===
- 1999: 1st in Division I Europe
- 2000: 3rd in Pool B
- 2001: 4th in Division I
- 2002: 4th in Division I
- 2003: 4th in Division I Group A
- 2004: 4th in Division I Group A
- 2005: 4th in Division I Group A
- 2006: 1st in Division I Group B
- 2007: 10th place
- 2008: 2nd in Division I Group B
- 2009: 1st in Division I Group B
- 2010: 9th place
- 2011: 1st in Division I Group A
- 2012: 9th place
- 2013: 10th place
- 2014: 1st in Division I Group A
- 2015: 9th place
- 2016: 9th place
- 2017: 10th place
- 2018: 1st in Division I Group A
- 2019: 8th place
- 2020: Cancelled due to the COVID-19 pandemic
- 2021: 9th place
- 2022: 7th place
- 2023: 8th place
- 2024: 8th place
- 2025: 8th place
- 2026: 4th place
