= Ice hockey at the 2006 Winter Olympics – Men's tournament =

2006 Winter Olympics
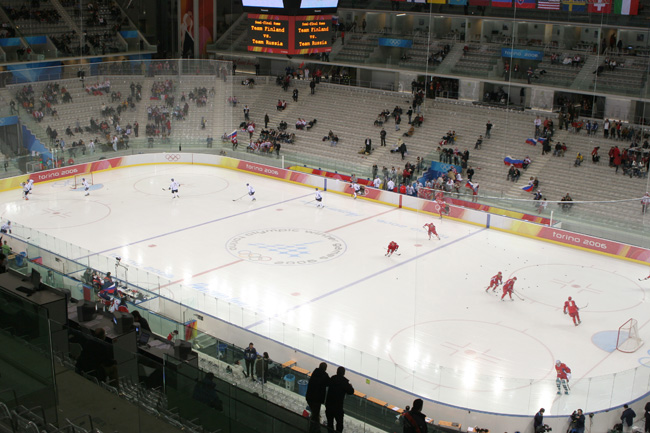
- Finland vs Russia in the semifinals

Tournament details
- Host country: Italy
- Venues: 2 (in 1 host city)
- Dates: 15–26 February
- Teams: 12

Final positions
- Champions: Sweden (2nd title)
- Runners-up: Finland
- Third place: Czech Republic
- Fourth place: Russia

Tournament statistics
- Games played: 38
- Goals scored: 206 (5.42 per game)
- Attendance: 236,013 (6,211 per game)
- Scoring leader: (Finland) Teemu Selänne (11 points)

Awards
- MVP: (Finland) Antero Niittymäki

The men's tournament in ice hockey at the 2006 Winter Olympics was held in Turin, Italy, from 15 to 26 February. Twelve teams competed, with Sweden winning the gold medal, Finland winning silver and the Czech Republic winning bronze. It was the third Olympic tournament to feature National Hockey League (NHL) players and the tenth best-on-best hockey tournament in history. American defenseman Chris Chelios set a standard for the longest time between his first Olympic ice hockey tournament and his last–he had competed twenty-two years earlier at the 1984 Olympics. The old record was set by Swiss hockey player Bibi Torriani, who had played twenty years after his debut (1928 and 1948).

The tournament format was changed from the 1998 and 2002 tournaments to a format similar to the 1992 and 1994 tournaments. The number of teams was reduced from 14 to 12, which were split into two groups in the preliminary stage (which followed a round robin format). Each team played the other teams in their group once. The top four teams from each group advanced to the quarter-finals.

The tournament is also notable for the lacklustre performance of defending champion Canada, which lost two group stage games (including a shock defeat to Switzerland) before being eliminated by Russia in the quarter-finals. There were allegations that Sweden intentionally lost their final group game against Slovakia to set up a quarterfinal against Switzerland.

In the semi-finals, Sweden defeated the Czech Republic and Finland beat Russia. Sweden won its second ice hockey gold, and first in a best-on-best competition, over Finland 3–2 in the final and the Czech Republic won the bronze medal. Three months later, Sweden won the 2006 World Championships and became the first team to win the Olympic and World Championship gold in the same year.

== Qualification ==
Canada, Sweden, Slovakia, Czech Republic, Finland, United States, Russia and Germany qualified as the top eight teams in the IIHF World Ranking in 2004. Italy qualified as host team. The remaining three teams qualified from qualification tournaments.

Event	Date	Location	Vacancies	Qualified
Host	19 June 1999	(South Korea) Seoul	1	Italy
2004 IIHF World Ranking	26 March 2001 – 9 May 2004	(Czech Republic) Prague and Ostrava	8	Canada; Sweden; Slovakia; Czech Republic; Finland; United States; Russia; Germany
Final qualification tournament	10–13 February 2005	(Switzerland) Kloten	1	Switzerland
Final qualification tournament	10–13 February 2005	(Latvia) Riga	1	Latvia
Final qualification tournament	10–13 February 2005	(Austria) Klagenfurt	1	Kazakhstan
Total			12	

Notes

1. ^{a} 2004 IIHF World Ranking were comprising the following events: 2001 World Championship, 2002 Winter Olympic Games, 2002 World Championship, 2003 World Championship and 2004 World Championship
2. ^{b} Prague and Ostrava were the sites for 2004 IIHF World Championship; at the conclusion of the tournament the ranking were finalized with regards to the qualification slots.

== Preliminary round ==
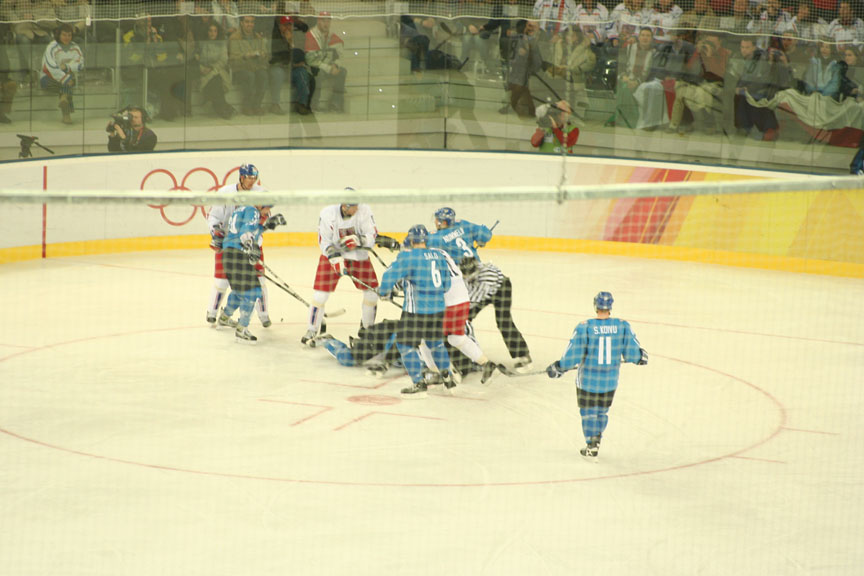
Czech Republic vs Finland

All times are local (UTC+1).

=== Group A ===
Pos	Team	Pld	W	D	L	GF	GA	GD	Pts	Qualification
1	Finland	5	5	0	0	19	2	+17	10	Quarterfinals
2	Switzerland	5	2	2	1	10	12	−2	6	Quarterfinals
3	Canada	5	3	0	2	15	9	+6	6	Quarterfinals
4	Czech Republic	5	2	0	3	14	12	+2	4	Quarterfinals
5	Germany	5	0	2	3	7	16	−9	2	
6	Italy (H)	5	0	2	3	9	23	−14	2	

Source: IIHF
(H) Hosts

15 February 2006; 13:05	Italy	2–7 (0–1, 2–5, 0–1)	Canada	Palasport Olimpico, Turin; Attendance: 8,575

Game reference

Jason Muzzatti
Goalies
Martin Brodeur
Referee:
(Sweden) Thomas Andersson
Linesmen:
(Slovakia) Miroslav Halecký
(Russia) Sergei Shelyanin

	0–1	5:33 – J. Iginla (T. Bertuzzi, J. Sakic) (PP)
J. Cirone (G. Scandella) (PP) – 20:43	1–1
	1–2	21:55 – D. Heatley (M. St. Louis, V. Lecavalier)
	1–3	25:38 – S. Doan (C. Pronger, B. Richards)
	1–4	26:04 – J. Iginla (J. Sakic) (PP)
	1–5	33:53 – M. St. Louis (D. Heatley, V. Lecavalier)
	1–6	34:38 – B. Richards (S. Doan, T. Bertuzzi)
J. Parco (T. Tuzzolino) – 38:08	2–6
	2–7	43:39 – J. Thornton (S. Gagné) (PP)

20 min
Penalties
12 min
20
Shots
50

15 February 2006; 15:35	Switzerland	0–5 (0–1, 0–4, 0–0)	Finland	Torino Esposizioni, Turin; Attendance: 2,960

Game reference

Martin Gerber (out 40:00)
David Aebischer (in 40:00)
Goalies
Antero Niittymäki
Referee:
(Canada) Don Van Massenhoven
Linesmen:
(Sweden) Joacim Karlsson
(United States) Thor Nelson

0–1	13:07 – O. Jokinen (V. Peltonen) (PP)
0–2	23:35 – T. Numminen (T. Selänne, J. Lehtinen) (PP)
0–3	28:04 – O. Jokinen (V. Peltonen, J. Jokinen) (PP)
0–4	33:25 – T. Selänne (S. Koivu)
0–5	39:25 – T. Selänne (J. Lehtinen, O. Jokinen)

10 min
Penalties
8 min
24
Shots
37

15 February 2006; 17:05	Germany	1–4 (1–0, 0–2, 0–2)	Czech Republic	Palasport Olimpico, Turin; Attendance: 6,463

Game reference

Olaf Kölzig
Goalies
Dominik Hašek (out 9:25)
Tomáš Vokoun (in 9:25)
Referee:
(Canada) Dan Marouelli
Linesmen:
(United States) Kevin Redding
(United States) Tony Sericolo

T. Boos (A. Sulzer) (PP) – 19:10	1–0
	1–1	21:02 – T. Kaberle (P. Kubina, T. Vokoun) (PP)
	1–2	23:38 – T. Kaberle (M. Straka, J. Jágr) (PP)
	1–3	57:47 – J. Jágr
	1–4	59:32 – D. Výborný (EN)

10 min
Penalties
12 min
25
Shots
34

16 February 2006; 12:05	Finland	6–0 (0–0, 4–0, 2–0)	Italy	Palasport Olimpico, Turin; Attendance: 7,776

Game reference

Fredrik Norrena
Goalies
Günther Hell
Referee:
(Russia) Vyacheslav Bulanov
Linesmen:
(Slovakia) Milan Mášik
(United States) Kevin Redding

J. Lehtinen (T. Numminen) (PP) – 21:49	1–0
S. Koivu (T. Numminen) (PP) – 23:51	2–0
J. Jokinen (P. Nummelin, S. Salo) (PP) – 30:11	3–0
V. Peltonen (P. Nummelin) (PP) – 38:25	4–0
T. Selänne (S. Koivu, S. Salo) (PP2) – 52:07	5–0
T. Selänne (J. Lehtinen) – 55:08	6–0

4 min
Penalties
22 min
51
Shots
16

16 February 2006; 13:05	Czech Republic	2–3 (0–1, 1–1, 1–1)	Switzerland	Torino Esposizioni, Turin; Attendance: 3,400

Game reference

Tomáš Vokoun
Goalies
David Aebischer
Referee:
(United States) Dennis LaRue
Linesmen:
(United States) Tony Sericolo
(Russia) Sergei Shelyanin

	0–1	5:11 – T. Ziegler (I. Rüthemann)
J. Jágr (M. Straka, V. Prospal) – 22:55	1–1
	1–2	29:44 – T. Paterlini (SH)
M. Židlický (A. Hemský, M. Ručinský) – 41:00	2–2
	2–3	46:42 – M. Streit (M. Seger, M. Plüss) (PP)

14 min
Penalties
20 min
42
Shots
19

16 February 2006; 20:05	Canada	5–1 (3–0, 1–1, 1–0)	Germany	Palasport Olimpico, Turin; Attendance: 8,554

Game reference

Roberto Luongo
Goalies
Thomas Greiss
Referee:
(Sweden) Christer Lärking
Linesmen:
(Slovakia) Miroslav Halecký
(United States) Thor Nelson

W. Redden (S. Gagné, J. Thornton) – 4:52	1–0
J. Sakic (T. Bertuzzi, R. Nash) (PP) – 7:29	2–0
S. Gagné (R. Regehr, B. Richards) – 10:49	3–0
	3–1	29:13 – C. Ehrhoff (C. Schubert, S. Ustorf)
D. Heatley (A. Foote) – 35:37	4–1
S. Doan (R. Smyth) – 59:26	5–1

24 min
Penalties
18 min
40
Shots
12

18 February 2006; 13:05	Italy	3–3 (1–0, 0–1, 2–2)	Germany	Palasport Olimpico, Turin; Attendance: 8,908

Game reference

Jason Muzzatti
Goalies
Olaf Kölzig
Referee:
(Finland) Timo Favorin
Linesmen:
(Sweden) Joacim Karlsson
(Slovakia) Milan Mášik

J. Parco (T. Iob) – 2:03	1–0
	1–1	26:21 – T. Martinec (T. Boos)
T. Iob (J. Parco, G. de Bettin) – 44:27	2–1
	2–2	47:16 – S. Felski (D. Kreutzer)
C. Borgatello (G. de Bettin, M. Chitaroni) (SH) – 58:28	3–2
	3–3	58:43 – M. Goc (D. Kreutzer, E. Lewandowski) (PP)

18 min
Penalties
16 min
21
Shots
34

18 February 2006; 15:35	Canada	0–2 (0–1, 0–1, 0–0)	Switzerland	Torino Esposizioni, Turin; Attendance: 4,769

Game reference
Martin Brodeur	Goalies	Martin Gerber	Referee: (Russia) Vyacheslav Bulanov; Linesmen: (Slovakia) Miroslav Halecký (United States) Kevin Redding
0–1 / 18:19 – P. DiPietro (P. Della Rossa); 0–2 / 28:47 – P. DiPietro (G. Bezina, M. Streit) (PP2)			Referee: (Russia) Vyacheslav Bulanov; Linesmen: (Slovakia) Miroslav Halecký (United States) Kevin Redding
34 min	Penalties	42 min	Referee: (Russia) Vyacheslav Bulanov; Linesmen: (Slovakia) Miroslav Halecký (United States) Kevin Redding
49	Shots	18	Referee: (Russia) Vyacheslav Bulanov; Linesmen: (Slovakia) Miroslav Halecký (United States) Kevin Redding

18 February 2006; 21:05	Czech Republic	2–4 (1–1, 1–1, 0–2)	Finland	Palasport Olimpico, Turin; Attendance: 8,705

Game reference

Tomáš Vokoun
Goalies
Antero Niittymäki
Referee:
(Sweden) Thomas Andersson
Linesmen:
(United States) Tony Sericolo
(Russia) Sergei Shelyanin

M. Židlický (R. Lang, M. Hejduk) (PP) – 8:25	1–0
	1–1	14:14 – O. Jokinen (S. Koivu, V. Peltonen)
	1–2	35:02 – J. Lehtinen (K. Timonen) (PP)
M. Židlický (R. Lang, J. Špaček) (PP2) – 38:17	2–2
	2–3	40:30 – T. Selänne (J. Lehtinen, S. Koivu)
	2–4	48:33 – J. Lehtinen (S. Koivu, T. Selänne)

12 min
Penalties
39 min
39
Shots
32

19 February 2006; 12:05	Germany	2–2 (0–0, 1–2, 1–0)	Switzerland	Palasport Olimpico, Turin; Attendance: 8,756

Game reference

Olaf Kölzig
Goalies
David Aebischer
Referee:
(Canada) Don Van Massenhoven
Linesmen:
(United States) Kevin Redding
(Russia) Sergei Shelyanin

S. Felski (C. Ehrhoff) – 22:20	1–0
	1–1	28:17 – F. Conne (P. Fischer)
	1–2	38:05 – P. DiPietro (P. Della Rossa)
T. Boos (E. Lewandowski) – 52:09	2–2

8 min
Penalties
8 min
28
Shots
25

19 February 2006; 20:05	Czech Republic	4–1 (2–0, 1–0, 1–1)	Italy	Palasport Olimpico, Turin; Attendance: 8,776

Game reference

Tomáš Vokoun
Goalies
Günther Hell (out 27:32)
Jason Muzzatti (in 27:32)
Referee:
(Russia) Vyacheslav Bulanov
Linesmen:
(Slovakia) Miroslav Halecký
(Sweden) Joacim Karlsson

M. Hejduk (D. Výborný, T. Kaberle) – 12:57	1–0
V. Prospal (J. Jágr, M. Straka) – 14:20	2–0
V. Prospal (M. Straka) (SH) – 28:36	3–0
	3–1	57:53 – J. Parco (G. de Bettin, T. Iob)
V. Prospal (M. Straka, T. Vokoun) (EN) – 58:40	4–1

20 min
Penalties
58 min
43
Shots
16

19 February 2006; 21:05	Finland	2–0 (2–0, 0–0, 0–0)	Canada	Torino Esposizioni, Turin; Attendance: 4,420

Game reference
Antero Niittymäki	Goalies	Roberto Luongo	Referee: (Czech Republic) Vladimír Šindler; Linesmen: (Slovakia) Milan Mášik (United States) Thor Nelson
T. Selänne (S. Koivu) – 11:14 / 1–0; N. Kapanen (V. Nieminen, K. Timonen) – 15:02 / 2–0			Referee: (Czech Republic) Vladimír Šindler; Linesmen: (Slovakia) Milan Mášik (United States) Thor Nelson
6 min	Penalties	12 min	Referee: (Czech Republic) Vladimír Šindler; Linesmen: (Slovakia) Milan Mášik (United States) Thor Nelson
30	Shots	24	Referee: (Czech Republic) Vladimír Šindler; Linesmen: (Slovakia) Milan Mášik (United States) Thor Nelson

21 February 2006; 12:35	Switzerland	3–3 (2–1, 0–1, 1–1)	Italy	Palasport Olimpico, Turin; Attendance: 8,529

Game reference

David Aebischer
Goalies
Jason Muzzatti
Referee:
(United States) Dennis LaRue
Linesmen:
(Slovakia) Milan Mášik
(United States) Tony Sericolo

R. Lemm (G. Bezina, S. Blindenbacher) (PP) − 3:06	1–0
P. Fischer (M. Plüss) – 6:33	2–0
	2–1	15:41 – J. Busillo (B. Nardella) (PP)
	2–2	20:53 – C. Trevisani (J. Cirone, J. Busillo) (PP)
	2–3	46:13 – T. Iob (G. de Bettin)
I. Rüthemann – 56:38	3–3

14 min
Penalties
10 min
25
Shots
35

21 February 2006; 15:35	Finland	2–0 (1–0, 1–0, 0–0)	Germany	Torino Esposizioni, Turin; Attendance: 2,430

Game reference
Fredrik Norrena	Goalies	Robert Müller	Referee: (Switzerland) Danny Kurmann; Linesmen: (Slovakia) Miroslav Halecký (United States) Kevin Redding
N. Kapanen (N. Hagman, S. Koivu) (PP) – 2:35 / 1–0; S. Koivu (J. Lehtinen, T. Selänne) – 39:39 / 2–0			Referee: (Switzerland) Danny Kurmann; Linesmen: (Slovakia) Miroslav Halecký (United States) Kevin Redding
6 min	Penalties	18 min	Referee: (Switzerland) Danny Kurmann; Linesmen: (Slovakia) Miroslav Halecký (United States) Kevin Redding
25	Shots	18	Referee: (Switzerland) Danny Kurmann; Linesmen: (Slovakia) Miroslav Halecký (United States) Kevin Redding

21 February 2006; 16:35	Canada	3–2 (3–0, 0–1, 0–1)	Czech Republic	Palasport Olimpico, Turin; Attendance: 9,126

Game reference

Martin Brodeur
Goalies
Tomáš Vokoun (out 20:00)
Milan Hnilička (in 20:00)
Referee:
(Canada) Dan Marouelli
Linesmen:
(Sweden) Joacim Karlsson
(United States) Thor Nelson

B. Richards (J. Iginla, C. Pronger) – 7:37	1–0
M. St. Louis (V. Lecavalier, R. Blake) (PP) – 11:19	2–0
C. Pronger (J. Thornton) – 19:24	3–0
	3–1	33:46 – P. Kubina (J. Jágr, M. Ručinský) (PP)
	3–2	42:41 – P. Čajánek (T. Kaberle, A. Hemský)

8 min
Penalties
4 min
16
Shots
33

=== Group B ===
Pos	Team	Pld	W	D	L	GF	GA	GD	Pts	Qualification
1	Slovakia	5	5	0	0	18	8	+10	10	Quarterfinals
2	Russia	5	4	0	1	23	11	+12	8	Quarterfinals
3	Sweden	5	3	0	2	15	12	+3	6	Quarterfinals
4	United States	5	1	1	3	13	13	0	3	Quarterfinals
5	Kazakhstan	5	1	0	4	9	16	−7	2	
6	Latvia	5	0	1	4	11	29	−18	1	

Source: IIHF

15 February 2006; 11:35	Kazakhstan	2–7 (0–3, 1–4, 1–0)	Sweden	Torino Esposizioni, Turin; Attendance: 2,200

Game reference

Vitali Yeremeyev
Goalies
Stefan Liv
Referee:
(Czech Republic) Vladimír Šindler
Linesmen:
(Finland) Stefan Fonselius
(Canada) Pierre Racicot

	0–1	7:45 – D. Tjärnqvist (J. Jönsson, T. Holmström)
	0–2	10:46 – D. Alfredsson (PP)
	0–3	16:06 – H. Sedin (M. Samuelsson, D. Sedin)
E. Koreshkov (SH) – 20:17	1–3
	1–4	28:47 – P. Axelsson (S. Påhlsson, M. Öhlund)
	1–5	31:08 – M. Sundin (C. Bäckman, F. Modin) (PP)
	1–6	35:31 – D. Sedin (M. Öhlund, H. Sedin)
	1–7	36:21 – D. Tjärnqvist (P. Axelsson, S. Påhlsson)
V. Antipin (D. Upper) – 48:33	2–7

18 min
Penalties
6 min
14
Shots
34

15 February 2006; 20:05	Russia	3–5 (2–1, 1–2, 0–2)	Slovakia	Torino Esposizioni, Turin; Attendance: 3,800

Game reference

Ilya Bryzgalov
Goalies
Peter Budaj
Referee:
(Canada) Paul Devorski
Linesmen:
(Canada) Derek Doucette
(Finland) Antti Hämäläinen

	0–1	9:07 – P. Demitra (Mari. Hossa, R. Suchý)
P. Datsyuk (D. Markov) – 10:00	1–1
A. Kovalev (P. Datsyuk, I. Kovalchuk) – 12:38	2–1
	2–2	25:51 – L. Višňovský (P. Demitra) (PP)
A. Ovechkin (S. Gonchar, F. Tyutin) (PP) – 30:03	3–2
	3–3	33:05 – P. Bondra (A. Meszároš, Z. Chára) (PP)
	3–4	56:32 – M. Gáborík
	3–5	59:31 – M. Gáborík

16 min
Penalties
10 min
23
Shots
36

15 February 2006; 21:05	Latvia	3–3 (1–2, 2–0, 0–1)	United States	Palasport Olimpico, Turin; Attendance: 7,851

Game reference

Artūrs Irbe
Goalies
John Grahame
Referee:
(Finland) Timo Favorin
Linesmen:
(Germany) Thomas Gemeinhardt
(Canada) Steve Miller

	0–1	9:44 – B. Gionta (J. Liles, S. Gomez) (PP)
	0–2	10:38 – C. Conroy
A. Ņiživijs (S. Ozoliņš) – 13:15	1–2
A. Tribuncovs (S. Ozoliņš, A. Ņiživijs) (PP) – 35:04	2–2
H. Vasiļjevs (R. Laviņš) – 35:44	3–2
	3–3	42:01 – J. Leopold (B. Hedican, C. Conroy)

16 min
Penalties
16 min
25
Shots
42

16 February 2006; 16:05	Sweden	0–5 (0–0, 0–3, 0–2)	Russia	Palasport Olimpico, Turin; Attendance: 8,545

Game reference

Henrik Lundqvist
Goalies
Evgeni Nabokov
Referee:
(Canada) Don Van Massenhoven
Linesmen:
(Czech Republic) Petr Blümel
(Canada) Steve Miller

0–1	27:13 – A. Kovalev (A. Markov) (PP)
0–2	28:05 – A. Ovechkin (A. Yashin)
0–3	38:58 – M. Sushinsky (E. Malkin, S. Zhukov)
0–4	50:31 – V. Kozlov (A. Frolov, A. Korolyuk)
0–5	54:04 – M. Afinogenov (P. Datsyuk)

20 min
Penalties
16 min
24
Shots
32

16 February 2006; 17:05	Slovakia	6–3 (4–1, 1–2, 1–0)	Latvia	Torino Esposizioni, Turin; Attendance: 2,960

Game reference

Ján Lašák
Goalies
Artūrs Irbe
Referee:
(Switzerland) Danny Kurmann
Linesmen:
(Finland) Stefan Fonselius
(Canada) Pierre Racicot

R. Zedník (L. Višňovský) – 5:23	1–0
R. Petrovický (T. Surový, A. Meszároš) – 5:43	2–0
	2–1	6:27 – S. Ozoliņš (M. Cipulis, G. Panteļejevs)
P. Demitra (Mari. Hossa) (SH) – 7:54	3–1
Mari. Hossa – 13:17	4–1
	4–2	20:54 – M. Cipulis (A. Cipruss, G. Panteļejevs)
	4–3	26:51 – A. Ņiživijs (K. Skrastiņš)
Z. Chára (Mari. Hossa) – 33:49	5–3
Mari. Hossa (M. Gáborík) – 49:04	6–3

12 min
Penalties
8 min
25
Shots
28

16 February 2006; 21:05	United States	4–1 (3–0, 0–0, 1–1)	Kazakhstan	Torino Esposizioni, Turin; Attendance: 3,400

Game reference

Rick DiPietro
Goalies
Vitali Kolesnik
Referee:
(Sweden) Thomas Andersson
Linesmen:
(Canada) Derek Doucette
(Finland) Antti Hämäläinen

B. Guerin (C. Drury) – 1:34	1–0
B. Rolston (D. Weight) (PP) – 8:31	2–0
B. Gionta (J. Liles, S. Gomez) (PP) – 16:50	3–0
	3–1	51:02 – E. Koreshkov (A. Vassilchenko) (PP)
M. Modano (E. Cole) – 51:53	4–1

10 min
Penalties
20 min
36
Shots
12

18 February 2006; 11:35	Kazakhstan	0–1 (0–0, 0–1, 0–0)	Russia	Torino Esposizioni, Turin; Attendance: 3,660

Game reference
Vitali Yeremeyev	Goalies	Evgeni Nabokov	Referee: (Sweden) Christer Lärking; Linesmen: (Finland) Stefan Fonselius (Germany) Thomas Gemeinhardt
0–1 / 31:38 – A. Kharitonov (M. Sushinsky, E. Malkin)			Referee: (Sweden) Christer Lärking; Linesmen: (Finland) Stefan Fonselius (Germany) Thomas Gemeinhardt
26 min	Penalties	12 min	Referee: (Sweden) Christer Lärking; Linesmen: (Finland) Stefan Fonselius (Germany) Thomas Gemeinhardt
24	Shots	50	Referee: (Sweden) Christer Lärking; Linesmen: (Finland) Stefan Fonselius (Germany) Thomas Gemeinhardt

18 February 2006; 17:05	Sweden	6–1 (1–0, 4–0, 1–1)	Latvia	Palasport Olimpico, Turin; Attendance: 8,795

Game reference

Henrik Lundqvist
Goalies
Sergejs Naumovs
Referee:
(Canada) Paul Devorski
Linesmen:
(Canada) Derek Doucette
(Finland) Antti Hämäläinen

S. Påhlsson (P. Forsberg) – 14:20	1–0
N. Lidström (H. Zetterberg) (PP) – 22:22	2–0
D. Alfredsson (K. Jönsson) (PP) – 24:59	3–0
P. Axelsson (P. Forsberg) (PP) – 25:17	4–0
H. Zetterberg (T. Holmström) – 27:58	5–0
D. Alfredsson (M. Sundin, N. Lidström) – 44:48	6–0
	6–1	49:10 – M. Ziediņš (A. Ņiživijs, S. Ozoliņš)

6 min
Penalties
14 min
40
Shots
14

18 February 2006; 20:05	Slovakia	2–1 (0–0, 1–1, 1–0)	United States	Torino Esposizioni, Turin; Attendance: 4,697

Game reference

Peter Budaj
Goalies
Rick DiPietro
Referee:
(Canada) Dan Marouelli
Linesmen:
(Czech Republic) Petr Blümel
(Canada) Pierre Racicot

Mari. Hossa (P. Demitra, M. Gáborík) (PP) – 34:20	1–0
	1–1	38:24 – B. Rolston (B. Rafalski, S. Gomez) (PP)
P. Bondra (M. Šatan, R. Kapuš) – 41:48	2–1

8 min
Penalties
16 min
21
Shots
30

19 February 2006; 13:05	Russia	9–2 (3–1, 3–0, 3–1)	Latvia	Torino Esposizioni, Turin; Attendance: 4,310

Game reference

Evgeni Nabokov (out 40:00)
Maxim Sokolov (in 40:00)
Goalies
Artūrs Irbe (out 27:58)
Edgars Masaļskis (in 27:58)
Referee:
(United States) Dennis LaRue
Linesmen:
(Czech Republic) Petr Blümel
(Finland) Stefan Fonselius

I. Kovalchuk (A. Kovalev, D. Markov) – 7:26	1–0
M. Sushinsky (A. Kharitonov, S. Gonchar) (PP2) – 9:15	2–0
	2–1	9:55 – A. Cipruss (SH)
I. Kovalchuk (P. Datsyuk) – 12:36	3–1
I. Kovalchuk (A. Kovalev, P. Datsyuk) – 23:32	4–1
V. Kozlov (A. Yashin) – 25:45	5–1
I. Kovalchuk (P. Datsyuk) – 35:16	6–1
A. Yashin (V. Kozlov, S. Zhukov) – 41:58	7–1
E. Malkin (M. Sushinsky, V. Vishnevski) – 47:32	8–1
A. Ovechkin (V. Kozlov, A. Yashin) – 56:27	9–1
	9–2	58:04 – M. Rēdlihs (A. Bērziņš)

16 min
Penalties
18 min
39
Shots
11

19 February 2006; 16:05	Slovakia	2–1 (0–1, 1–0, 1–0)	Kazakhstan	Palasport Olimpico, Turin; Attendance: 9,160

Game reference

Karol Križan
Goalies
Vitali Kolesnik
Referee:
(Switzerland) Danny Kurmann
Linesmen:
(Canada) Derek Doucette
(Finland) Antti Hämäläinen

	0–1	16:16 – E. Koreshkov (A. Koreshkov, A. Savenkov) (PP)
P. Bondra (R. Kapuš, M. Jurčina) (PP) – 39:50	1–1
Mari. Hossa (P. Demitra, M. Gáborík) – 48:09	2–1

12 min
Penalties
20 min
27
Shots
19

19 February 2006; 17:05	United States	1–2 (1–1, 0–0, 0–1)	Sweden	Torino Esposizioni, Turin; Attendance: 4,450

Game reference

Rick DiPietro
Goalies
Henrik Lundqvist
Referee:
(Canada) Dan Marouelli
Linesmen:
(Germany) Thomas Gemeinhardt
(Canada) Steve Miller

	0–1	7:05 – D. Alfredsson (K. Jönsson, M. Sundin)
M. Modano (C. Conroy, C. Chelios) – 17:31	1–1
	1–2	44:22 – M. Samuelsson (D. Alfredsson, M. Sundin) (PP)

14 min
Penalties
12 min
25
Shots
26

21 February 2006; 11:35	Latvia	2–5 (1–1, 0–1, 1–3)	Kazakhstan	Torino Esposizioni, Turin; Attendance: 2,300

Game reference

Sergejs Naumovs
Goalies
Vitali Yeremeyev
Referee:
(Sweden) Christer Lärking
Linesmen:
(Canada) Derek Doucette
(Germany) Thomas Gemeinhardt

	0–1	7:20 – A. Koreshkov (E. Koreshkov)
L. Tambijevs (A. Ņiživijs) (PP) – 15:13	1–1
	1–2	35:04 – N. Antropov (E. Koreshkov)
A. Cipruss (G. Panteļejevs, A. Tribuncovs) – 45:04	2–2
	2–3	52:33 – S. Alexandrov (F. Polishchuk, A. Troschinsky)
	2–4	54:53 – E. Koreshkov (PS)
	2–5	58:08 – E. Koreshkov (A. Koreshkov)

14 min
Penalties
6 min
32
Shots
30

21 February 2006; 20:05	Sweden	0–3 (0–1, 0–0, 0–2)	Slovakia	Torino Esposizioni, Turin; Attendance: 4,250

Game reference

Mikael Tellqvist
Goalies
Karol Križan
Referee:
(Finland) Timo Favorin
Linesmen:
(Czech Republic) Petr Blümel
(Canada) Pierre Racicot

0–1	15:51 – P. Bondra (M. Šatan)
0–2	46:16 – Mari. Hossa (P. Demitra, M. Gáborík)
0–3	58:58 – R. Suchý (P. Demitra, Mari. Hossa)

14 min
Penalties
10 min
17
Shots
31

21 February 2006; 20:35	United States	4–5 (1–2, 1–1, 2–2)	Russia	Palasport Olimpico, Turin; Attendance: 9,378

Game reference

Robert Esche
Goalies
Evgeni Nabokov (out 20:00)
Maxim Sokolov (in 20:00)
Referee:
(Canada) Paul Devorski
Linesmen:
(Finland) Stefan Fonselius
(Canada) Steve Miller

	0–1	9:27 – A. Korolyuk
	0–2	10:41 – E. Malkin (D. Kasparaitis) (SH)
B. Rolston (C. Conroy) (PP) – 18:38	1–2
	1–3	35:00 – A. Markov (P. Datsyuk, M. Sushinsky)
B. Gionta (S. Gomez, D. Weight) (PP) – 39:01	2–3
S. Gomez (M. Schneider, B. Rolston) (PP) – 45:00	3–3
	3–4	49:55 – A. Ovechkin (E. Malkin, D. Kasparaitis)
E. Cole (M. Knuble, C. Drury) – 50:38	4–4
	4–5	51:52 – A. Kovalev (P. Datsyuk, E. Malkin)

8 min
Penalties
14 min
34
Shots
21

== Playoff round ==
=== Bracket ===
Quarterfinals
22 February
Finland	4
United States	3
22 February
Russia	2
Canada	0
22 February
Switzerland	2
Sweden	6
22 February
Slovakia	1
Czech Republic	3

Semifinals
24 February
Finland	4
Russia	0
24 February
Sweden	7
Czech Republic	3

Gold medal game
26 February
Finland	2
Sweden	3
Bronze medal game
25 February
Russia	0
Czech Republic	3

=== Quarterfinals ===
22 February 2006; 16:35	Switzerland	2–6 (1–2, 0–3, 1–1)	Sweden	Torino Esposizioni, Turin; Attendance: 2,970

Game reference

Martin Gerber
Goalies
Henrik Lundqvist
Referee:
(Canada) Dan Marouelli
Linesmen:
(United States) Thor Nelson
(Russia) Sergei Shelyanin

	0–1	3:05 – H. Sedin (D. Sedin, N. Lidström)
M. Streit (P. Della Rossa, M. Plüss) – 8:37	1–1
	1–2	13:49 – F. Modin (P. Forsberg, D. Alfredsson) (PP)
	1–3	22:17 – H. Zetterberg (T. Holmström, K. Jönsson)
	1–4	29:07 – M. Sundin (N. Lidström, D. Alfredsson) (PP)
	1–5	32:52 – M. Sundin (P. Forsberg, D. Tjärnqvist)
R. Lemm (I. Rüthemann) – 40:49	2–5
	2–6	48:36 − S. Påhlsson (D. Alfredsson, P. Axelsson)

8 min
Penalties
2 min
29
Shots
27

22 February 2006; 17:35	Finland	4–3 (2–1, 2–1, 0–1)	United States	Palasport Olimpico, Turin; Attendance: 6,691

Game reference

Antero Niittymäki
Goalies
Rick DiPietro
Referee:
(Canada) Paul Devorski
Linesmen:
(Slovakia) Milan Mášik
(Canada) Steve Miller

V. Peltonen (J. Jokinen, S. Salo) – 9:33	1–0
S. Salo (SH) − 12:01	2–0
	2–1	13:14 – M. Knuble (M. Schneider, D. Weight)
	2–2	21:29 − M. Schneider (B. Rafalski, C. Conroy) (PP)
O. Jokinen (V. Peltonen) (PP) – 25:06	3–2
O. Jokinen (PP2) – 37:10	4–2
	4–3	55:33 – B. Gionta (C. Drury, E. Cole)

16 min
Penalties
30 min
25
Shots
28

22 February 2006; 20:35	Russia	2–0 (0–0, 0–0, 2–0)	Canada	Torino Esposizioni, Turin; Attendance: 4,130

Game reference
Evgeni Nabokov	Goalies	Martin Brodeur	Referee: (United States) Dennis LaRue; Linesmen: (Sweden) Joacim Karlsson (United States) Tony Sericolo
A. Ovechkin (V. Kozlov) (PP) – 41:30 / 1–0; A. Kovalev (A. Markov) (PP) – 59:37 / 2–0			Referee: (United States) Dennis LaRue; Linesmen: (Sweden) Joacim Karlsson (United States) Tony Sericolo
41 min	Penalties	18 min	Referee: (United States) Dennis LaRue; Linesmen: (Sweden) Joacim Karlsson (United States) Tony Sericolo
33	Shots	27	Referee: (United States) Dennis LaRue; Linesmen: (Sweden) Joacim Karlsson (United States) Tony Sericolo

22 February 2006; 21:35	Slovakia	1–3 (0–1, 0–1, 1–1)	Czech Republic	Palasport Olimpico, Turin; Attendance: 6,893

Game reference

Peter Budaj
Goalies
Milan Hnilička
Referee:
(Canada) Don Van Massenhoven
Linesmen:
(Finland) Stefan Fonselius
(Canada) Pierre Racicot

	0–1	12:51 – M. Ručinský (SH)
	0–2	28:41 – M. Hejduk (F. Kaberle, M. Ručinský)
M. Gáborík (Mari. Hossa) – 43:38	1–2
	1–3	59:57 − M. Straka (EN)

8 min
Penalties
14 min
21
Shots
28

=== Semifinals ===
24 February 2006; 16:35	Sweden	7–3 (2–1, 4–2, 1–0)	Czech Republic	Palasport Olimpico, Turin; Attendance: 8,071

Game reference

Henrik Lundqvist
Goalies
Milan Hnilička (out 27:54)
Tomáš Vokoun (in 27:54)
Referee:
(Canada) Dan Marouelli
Linesmen:
(Finland) Antti Hämäläinen
(Canada) Pierre Racicot

F. Modin (M. Sundin, P. Forsberg) – 0:34	1–0
	1–1	3:11 – F. Kuba (M. Straka, V. Prospal)
P. Axelsson (N. Lidström, N. Kronwall) – 13:37	2–1
H. Sedin (D. Sedin) – 21:16	3–1
C. Bäckman (D. Alfredsson) – 23:54	4–1
J. Jönsson (K. Jönsson, M. Samuelsson) (PP) – 27:54	5–1
	5–2	30:40 – A. Hemský (J. Jágr, M. Židlický) (PP)
	5–3	31:25 – V. Prospal (D. Výborný)
D. Alfredsson (P. Axelsson) – 39:00	6–3
T. Holmström (H. Zetterberg) – 56:05	7–3

8 min
Penalties
6 min
32
Shots
24

24 February 2006; 21:05	Finland	4–0 (1–0, 2–0, 1–0)	Russia	Palasport Olimpico, Turin; Attendance: 8,702

Game reference

Antero Niittymäki
Goalies
Evgeni Nabokov
Referee:
(Canada) Don Van Massenhoven
Linesmen:
(Slovakia) Milan Mášik
(United States) Tony Sericolo

V. Peltonen (K. Timonen) (PP) – 6:13	1–0
T. Lydman (S. Koivu) – 29:33	2–0
S. Koivu (K. Timonen, T. Selänne) (PP) – 33:51	3–0
O. Jokinen (V. Peltonen, N. Kapanen) – 49:17	4–0

8 min
Penalties
16 min
30
Shots
21

=== Bronze medal game ===
25 February 2006; 20:35	Russia	0–3 (0–1, 0–1, 0–1)	Czech Republic	Palasport Olimpico, Turin; Attendance: 8,379

Game reference

Evgeni Nabokov
Goalies
Tomáš Vokoun
Referee:
(Sweden) Thomas Andersson
Linesmen:
(Sweden) Joacim Karlsson
(Canada) Steve Miller

0–1	4:48 – M. Erat (D. Výborný, R. Lang)
0–2	26:36 – M. Židlický (J. Jágr, R. Lang) (PP)
0–3	59:52 – M. Straka (M. Erat) (EN)

41 min
Penalties
14 min
28
Shots
15

=== Gold medal game ===
26 February 2006; 14:05	Finland	2–3 (1–0, 1–2, 0–1)	Sweden	Palasport Olimpico, Turin; Attendance: 8,274

Game reference

Antero Niittymäki
Goalies
Henrik Lundqvist
Referee:
(Canada) Paul Devorski
Linesmen:
(Slovakia) Milan Mášik
(United States) Thor Nelson

K. Timonen (T. Selänne) (PP) – 14:45	1–0
	1–1	24:42 – H. Zetterberg (M. Samuelsson, C. Bäckman) (PP)
	1–2	33:24 – N. Kronwall (H. Zetterberg) (PP)
V. Peltonen (J. Jokinen, O. Jokinen) – 35:00	2–2
	2–3	40:10 – N. Lidström (M. Sundin, P. Forsberg)

14 min
Penalties
14 min
27
Shots
28

== Final ranking ==
Rank	Team
1st place, gold medalist(s)	Sweden
2nd place, silver medalist(s)	Finland
3rd place, bronze medalist(s)	Czech Republic
4	Russia
5	Slovakia
6	Switzerland
7	Canada
8	United States
9	Kazakhstan
10	Germany
11	Italy
12	Latvia

== Statistics ==
=== Average age ===
Team USA was the oldest team in the tournament, averaging 31 years and 8 months. Team Germany was the youngest team in the tournament, averaging 26 years and 7 months. Gold medalists Team Sweden averaged 29 years and 7 months. Tournament average was 29 years and 2 months.

=== Scoring leaders ===
List shows the top ten skaters sorted by points, then goals.

Player	GP	G	A	Pts	+/−	PIM	POS
(Finland) Teemu Selänne	8	6	5	11	+7	4	F
(Finland) Saku Koivu	8	3	8	11	+5	12	F
(Sweden) Daniel Alfredsson	8	5	5	10	+2	4	F
(Slovakia) Marián Hossa	6	5	5	10	+9	4	F
(Finland) Ville Peltonen	8	4	5	9	+4	6	F
(Finland) Olli Jokinen	8	6	2	8	+5	2	F
(Finland) Jere Lehtinen	8	3	5	8	+6	0	F
(Sweden) Mats Sundin	8	3	5	8	+1	4	F
(Czech Republic) Martin Straka	8	2	6	8	+4	6	F
(Russia) Pavel Datsyuk	8	1	7	8	+5	10	F

GP = Games played; G = Goals; A = Assists; Pts = Points; +/− = Plus–minus; PIM = Penalties in minutes; POS = Position
Source: IIHF

=== Leading goaltenders ===
Only the top five goaltenders, based on save percentage, who have played at least 40% of their team's minutes, are included in this list.

Player	TOI	GA	GAA	SA	Sv%	SO
(Finland) Antero Niittymäki	358:51	8	1.34	164	95.12	3
(Russia) Evgeni Nabokov	359:27	8	1.34	134	94.03	3
(Switzerland) David Aebischer	200:00	7	2.10	117	94.02	0
(Slovakia) Peter Budaj	179:24	6	2.01	79	92.41	0
(Canada) Martin Brodeur	238:40	8	2.01	104	92.31	0

TOI = Time on Ice (minutes:seconds); SA = Shots against; GA = Goals against; GAA = Goals against average; Sv% = Save percentage; SO = Shutouts
Source: IIHF

== Awards ==
- Media All-Stars
  - Goaltender: (Finland) Antero Niittymäki
  - Defencemen: (Sweden) Nicklas Lidström, (Finland) Kimmo Timonen
  - Forwards: (Finland) Saku Koivu, (Finland) Teemu Selänne, (Russia) Alexander Ovechkin

Source: IIHF

- Most Valuable Player: (Finland) Antero Niittymäki
- Best players selected by the directorate:
  - Best Goaltender: (Finland) Antero Niittymäki
  - Best Defenceman: (Sweden) Kenny Jönsson
  - Best Forward: (Finland) Teemu Selänne

Source: IIHF

== Controversy ==
=== Allegations of Sweden throwing a game ===
Allegations have surfaced of the Swedish team throwing a game against Slovakia so the Swedes would face Switzerland instead of Canada or the Czech Republic. Shortly before the game, Sweden coach Bengt-Åke Gustafsson was reported to have publicly contemplated tanking in order to avoid those teams, saying about Canada and the Czechs, "One is cholera, the other the plague". During the game itself, one reportedly suspect sequence came when Sweden had an extended five-on-three powerplay with five stars on the ice—Peter Forsberg, Mats Sundin, Daniel Alfredsson, Nicklas Lidström and Fredrik Modin—and failed to put a shot on net. Sports Illustrated writer Michael Farber would say about this particular powerplay, "If the Swedes had passed the puck any more, their next opponent would have been the Washington Generals". "[They] were even afraid to shoot!", Russian coach Vladimir Krikunov said. The IIHF supervisor "didn't see anything special" about the game.

As part of a subsequent interview about Sweden's gold medal win over five years later, Forsberg was interpreted to insinuate that Sweden lost their preliminary round game against Slovakia on purpose, so as to draw Switzerland as their quarterfinal opponent, rather than Canada or the Czech Republic. Swedish forward Henrik Sedin, who played alongside Forsberg on the 2006 team denied the notion while adding that Forsberg's comments in the interview were misconstrued.
