= Daniel Tjärnqvist =

Swedish ice hockey player

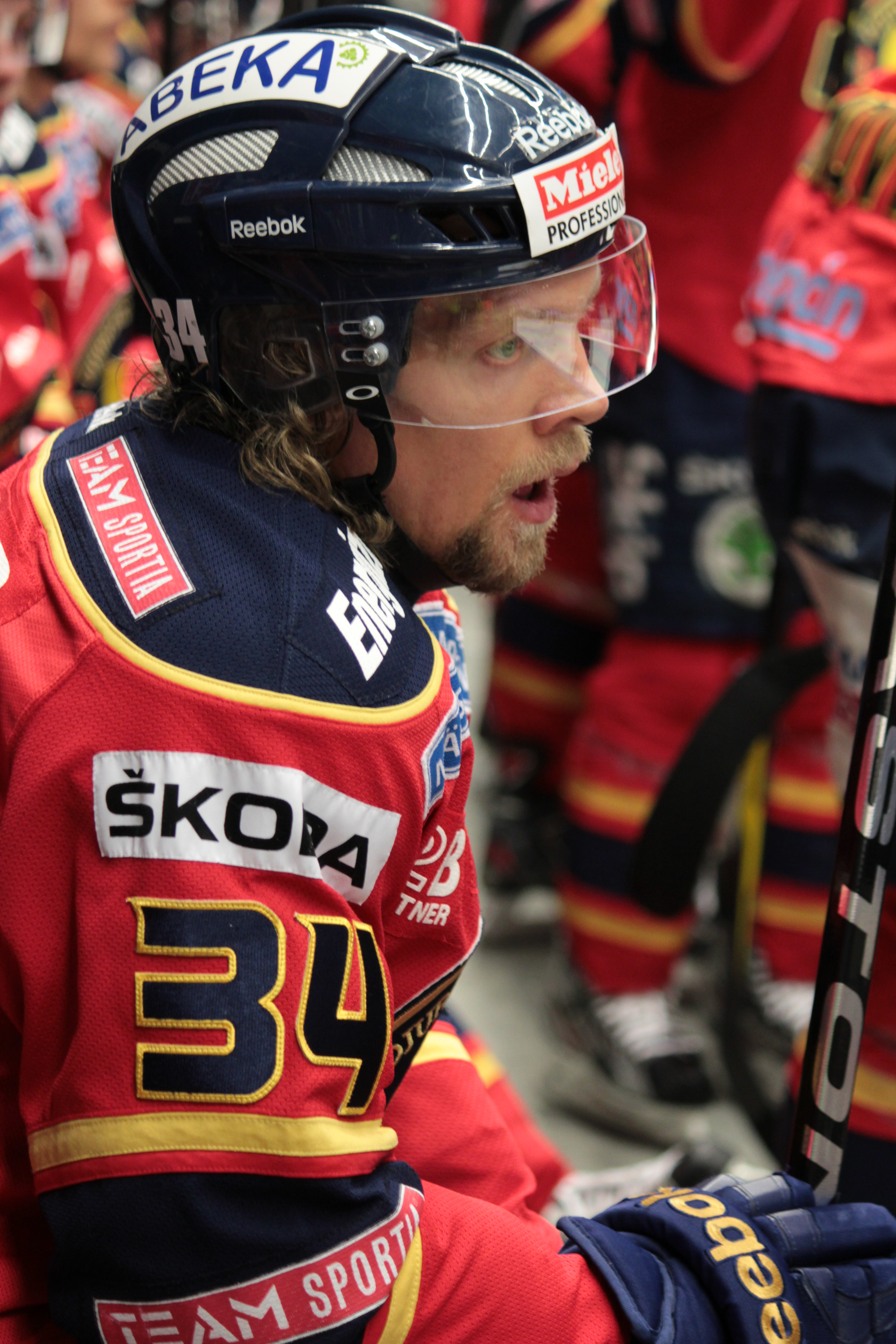
- Born: October 14, 1976 (age 50) Umeå, Sweden
- Height: 6 ft 1 in (185 cm)
- Weight: 207 lb (94 kg; 14 st 11 lb)
- Position: Defence
- Shot: Left
- Played for: Rögle; Djurgårdens IF; Atlanta Thrashers; Minnesota Wild; Edmonton Oilers; Colorado Avalanche; Lokomotiv Yaroslavl; Kölner Haie
- National team: Sweden
- NHL draft: 88th overall, 1995; Florida Panthers
- Playing career: 1994–2015

Daniel Carl Tjärnqvist (born October 14, 1976) is a Swedish former professional ice hockey defenceman who played in the National Hockey League (NHL) with the Atlanta Thrashers, Minnesota Wild, Edmonton Oilers and the Colorado Avalanche. His younger brother, Mathias, is an assistant coach in Malmö Redhawks in the Swedish elite league Elitserien.

== Playing career ==
Tjärnqvist was drafted by the Florida Panthers as their fourth-round pick, 88th overall, in the 1995 NHL entry draft; however, Tjärnqvist never played a game for the team {{citation needed}}.

After four years with Djurgården in the Swedish Elitserien, Tjärnqvist spent three seasons with the Atlanta Thrashers in the National Hockey League; after the 2004–05 lockout he played for the Minnesota Wild.

On July 6, 2006, Tjärnqvist signed a one-year deal with the Edmonton Oilers. Daniel established himself in the Oilers defense until he was beset with a pubic bone injury, missing the majority of the 2006–07 NHL season. Tjärnqvist, a free agent, then spent the 2007–08 season in the Russian Super League reportedly signing with Ak Bars Kazan, before formally signing a contract with Lokomotiv Yaroslavl.

On July 3, 2008, with the option to remain in Russia, Tjärnqvist instead came back for a second stint in the NHL, signing a one-year contract with the Colorado Avalanche. Tjärnqvist was used primarily as a reserve defenseman before succumbing to a concussion to end his 2008–09 campaign.

On May 24, 2009, Tjärnqvist signed a one-year contract to return to Russia with his previous team, Lokomotiv Yaroslavl of the KHL, for the 2009–10 season. Establishing himself as Lokomotiv's best defensive defender, he appeared in 54 games, notching 10 points and adding 3 more in Yaroslavl's run to the Western Conference finals. On June 18, 2010, he was re-signed by the KHL team to a further one-year deal.

On June 27, 2011, Tjärnqvist returned to Djurgården in Swedish Elitserien signing a one plus one optional year contract. As an Alternate captain with the club, he was primarily used as a stay at home defenseman and produced 14 points in 45 games during the 2011–12 season.

On May 12, 2012, Tjärnqvist opted not to extend his contract in Sweden and signed a one-year deal with a German club, Kölner Haie, of the DEL. Upon spending the 2014–15 season with Haie, Tjärnqvist sat out the following season as a free agent before announcing his retirement from professional hockey on June 1, 2016.

== Records ==
- First Swedish player to win the SM-liiga (1997).

== Career statistics ==
=== Regular season and playoffs ===
			Regular season					Playoffs
Season	Team	League	GP	G	A	Pts	PIM	GP	G	A	Pts	PIM
1993–94	Rögle BK	J20	—	—	—	—	—	—	—	—	—	—
1994–95	Rögle BK	J20	11	1	5	6	8	—	—	—	—	—
1994–95	Rögle BK	SEL	18	0	1	1	2	—	—	—	—	—
1994–95	Rögle BK	Allsv	15	2	4	6	0	11	4	0	4	0
1995–96	Rögle BK	SEL	22	1	7	8	6	—	—	—	—	—
1995–96	Rögle BK	Allsv	18	5	16	21	6	11	1	4	5	4
1996–97	Jokerit	FIN U20	2	1	0	1	0	—	—	—	—	—
1996–97	Jokerit	SM-l	44	3	8	11	4	9	0	3	3	4
1997–98	Djurgårdens IF	SEL	40	5	9	14	12	15	1	1	2	2
1998–99	Djurgårdens IF	SEL	40	4	3	7	16	4	0	0	0	2
1999–00	Djurgårdens IF	SEL	42	3	16	19	8	5	0	0	0	2
2000–01	Djurgårdens IF	SEL	45	9	17	26	26	16	6	5	11	2
2001–02	Atlanta Thrashers	NHL	75	2	16	18	14	—	—	—	—	—
2002–03	Atlanta Thrashers	NHL	75	3	12	15	26	—	—	—	—	—
2003–04	Atlanta Thrashers	NHL	68	5	15	20	20	—	—	—	—	—
2004–05	Djurgårdens IF	SEL	49	12	12	24	30	12	2	5	7	10
2005–06	Minnesota Wild	NHL	60	3	15	18	32	—	—	—	—	—
2006–07	Edmonton Oilers	NHL	37	3	12	15	30	—	—	—	—	—
2007–08	Lokomotiv Yaroslavl	RSL	18	1	2	3	14	8	0	4	4	4
2008–09	Colorado Avalanche	NHL	37	2	2	4	8	—	—	—	—	—
2009–10	Lokomotiv Yaroslavl	KHL	54	3	7	10	26	17	0	3	3	8
2010–11	Lokomotiv Yaroslavl	KHL	24	3	4	7	12	10	3	3	6	12
2011–12	Djurgårdens IF	SEL	45	4	10	14	22	—	—	—	—	—
2012–13	Kölner Haie	DEL	49	6	22	28	51	5	0	2	2	2
2013–14	Kölner Haie	DEL	52	5	12	17	41	7	0	0	0	2
2014–15	Kölner Haie	DEL	51	2	8	10	20	—	—	—	—	—
SEL totals			301	38	75	113	122	62	12	12	24	20
KHL totals			78	6	11	17	38	27	3	6	9	20
NHL totals			352	18	72	90	130	—	—	—	—	—

=== International ===
Medal record

Representing Sweden

Olympic Games
Gold medal – first place	2006 Turin	

World Championships
Silver medal – second place	2003 Helsinki	
Silver medal – second place	2004 Prague	
Bronze medal – third place	2001 Cologne	
Bronze medal – third place	2002 Gothenburg	

World Junior Championships
Silver medal – second place	1996 Boston	
Bronze medal – third place	1995 Alberta	

European Junior Championships
Silver medal – second place	1994 Jyväskylä	

Year	Team	Event	Result	GP	G	A	Pts	PIM
1994	Sweden	EJC	1st place, gold medalist(s)	5	2	1	3	0
1995	Sweden	WJC	3rd place, bronze medalist(s)	7	0	0	0	2
1996	Sweden	WJC	2nd place, silver medalist(s)	5	2	2	4	0
2000	Sweden	WC	7th	7	1	1	2	0
2001	Sweden	WC	3rd place, bronze medalist(s)	9	0	6	6	6
2002	Sweden	WC	3rd place, bronze medalist(s)	9	2	3	5	0
2003	Sweden	WC	2nd place, silver medalist(s)	8	1	2	3	2
2004	Sweden	WC	2nd place, silver medalist(s)	9	1	1	2	0
2004	Sweden	WCH	5th	3	0	0	0	2
2006	Sweden	OG	1st place, gold medalist(s)	8	2	1	3	4
Junior totals				17	4	4	8	2
Senior totals				53	7	13	20	14

== Awards ==
- SM-liiga champion with Jokerit in 1997.
- Elitserien playoff winner with Djurgården in 2000 and 2001.
- World Championship's Best Defenceman in 2002.
- Olympic gold medal at the 2006 Turin Olympics.

== See also ==
- Notable families in the NHL
