= Tomáš Vokoun =

Czech ice hockey player (born 1976)

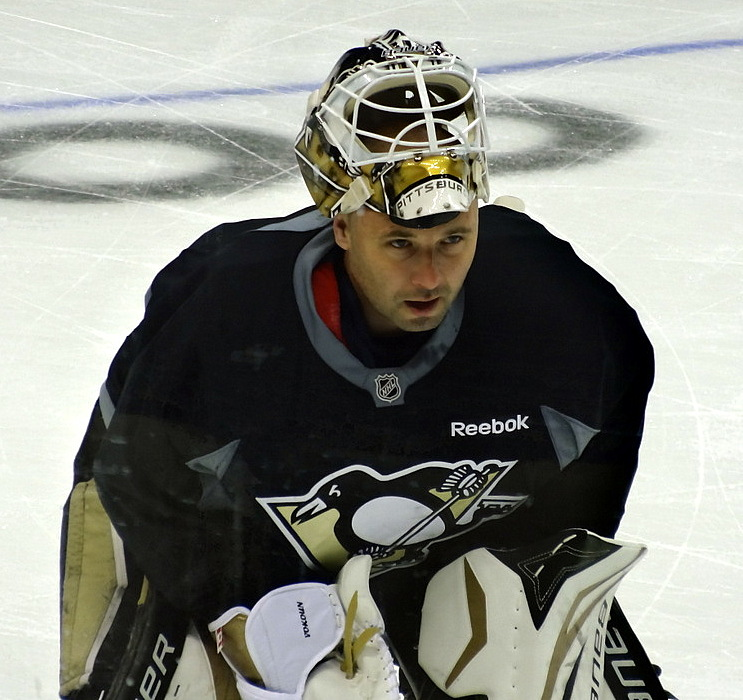
- Vokoun with the Pittsburgh Penguins in 2013
- Born: 2 July 1976 (age 50) Karlovy Vary, Czechoslovakia
- Height: 6 ft 0 in (183 cm)
- Weight: 195 lb (88 kg; 13 st 13 lb)
- Position: Goaltender
- Caught: Right
- Played for: HC Kladno; Montreal Canadiens; Nashville Predators; HC Znojemsti Orli Znojmo; HIFK; Florida Panthers; Washington Capitals; Pittsburgh Penguins
- National team: Czech Republic
- NHL draft: 226th overall, 1994; Montreal Canadiens
- Playing career: 1995–2014

Tomáš Vokoun (Czech pronunciation: [ˈtomaːʃ ˈvokoun]; born 2 July 1976) is a Czech former professional ice hockey goaltender who played in the National Hockey League (NHL) from 1997 to 2013, mainly with the Nashville Predators. He was selected by the Montreal Canadiens in the ninth round, 226th overall, in the 1994 NHL entry draft, and played one game for the team, as well as playing with the Florida Panthers, Washington Capitals, and Pittsburgh Penguins. Internationally, Vokoun played for the Czech national team at several tournaments, including the 2006 and 2010 Winter Olympics, winning a bronze medal in 2006, as well as gold medals at the 2005 and 2010 World Championships.

== Playing career ==
=== Early career (1994–1998) ===
Vokoun was drafted by the Montreal Canadiens in the ninth round of the 1994 NHL entry draft, 226th overall. He remained in the Czech Republic for another year, playing with Poldi Kladno.

Vokoun moved to North America for the 1995–96 season and played for the Wheeling Thunderbirds of the ECHL. He was called up to the Fredericton Canadiens of the American Hockey League (AHL) and played one playoff game. Having proven himself in the ECHL, Vokoun spent the 1996–97 season in Fredericton and played in his only game for Montreal; it was not a stellar debut, however, as he allowed four goals in only 20 minutes of play against the Philadelphia Flyers.

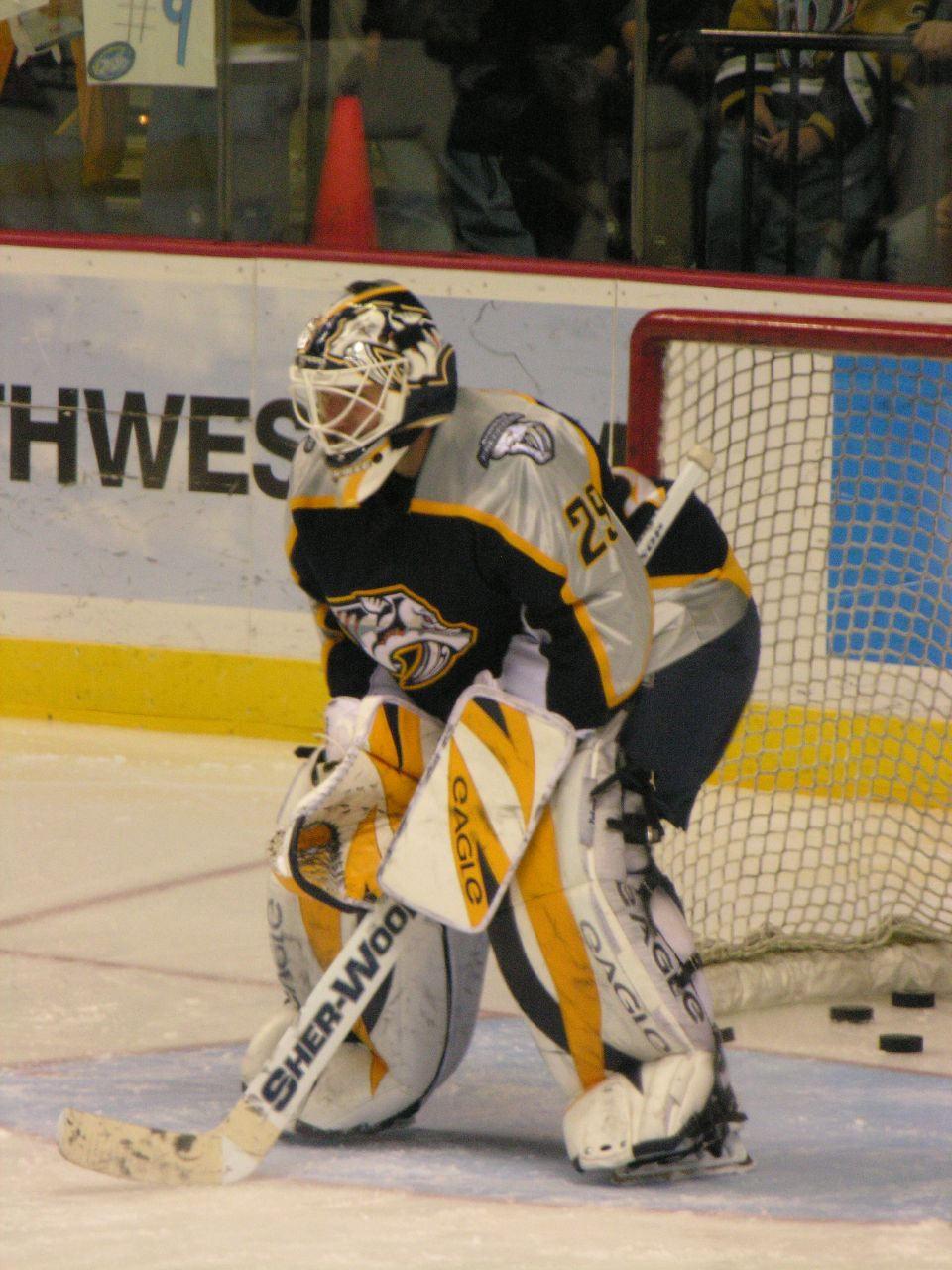
Vokoun playing for the Nashville Predators

=== Nashville Predators (1998–2007) ===
After another season with the Fredericton Canadiens, Vokoun was chosen by the Nashville Predators in the 1998 NHL Expansion Draft on 26 June 1998.

Vokoun played 37 games for Nashville in their debut season and played nine games for the Milwaukee Admirals in the International Hockey League (IHL). Although he again split time between the two clubs the following season, by 2000, Vokoun established himself in the NHL, though he initially only saw limited action as the back-up to starter Mike Dunham. In 2002, Dunham was traded to the New York Rangers for Marek Židlický, Tomáš Klouček and Rem Murray, effectively awarding Vokoun the starting job.

Vokoun's play was solid enough in 2003–04 to send him to the All-Star Game for the first time, and his goaltending was a major factor in the Predators' first-ever playoff berth that season. The team lost in six games to the Detroit Red Wings in the first round. In game 4 of that series, played in Nashville, Vokoun earned the first-ever playoff shutout in franchise history, stopping 41 Red Wing shots.

During the 2004–05 NHL lockout, Vokoun played 19 regular season games for HIFK in the Finnish SM-liiga, posting a .940 save percentage. In the playoffs, Vokoun did not perform as well, posting an .846 save percentage in four games, the worst in the league in that year's playoffs.

On 10 April 2006, the Predators announced Vokoun was afflicted by thrombophlebitis of the pelvis, a blood-clotting condition. He missed the team's remaining regular season games and the entire playoffs while he recovered by taking blood-thinning drugs and avoiding physical activity. Back-up goaltender Chris Mason took his place as the starter, but the Predators failed to advance in the playoffs, again losing in the quarter-finals. On 24 July 2006, Vokoun was cleared to resume his career and returned for the 2006–07 NHL season. However, at the beginning of the season, Vokoun injured his thumb during a game and was required to have surgery. Pins were put in this thumb, and he played with the pins and a brace on his thumb.

=== Florida Panthers (2007–2011) ===
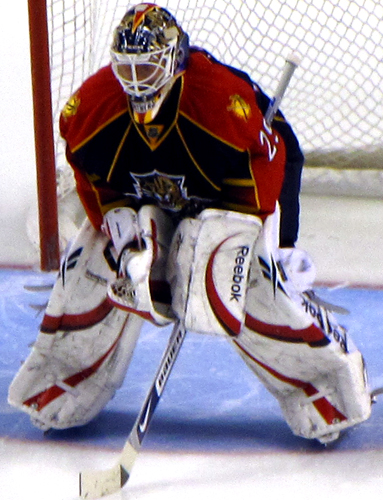
Vokoun with the Panthers in 2009.

On the day of the 2007 NHL entry draft, Vokoun was traded to the Florida Panthers in exchange for a first-round selection in the 2008 NHL entry draft, a second-round selection in the 2007 draft (58th overall) and a conditional second-round selection in either 2007 or 2008. Vokoun's nine-year tenure in Nashville had him setting many of the Predators' goaltending records, all of which were overtaken by Pekka Rinne in the following decade.

Vokoun was selected to play for the Eastern Conference team in the 2008 NHL All Star Game in Atlanta.

During the 2008–09 NHL season, Vokoun recorded 26 wins for the Panthers as they battled for their first playoff berth since 2000. Although they ultimately fell short, the Panthers' being in position to qualify was due in large part to the goaltending of Vokoun and fellow goaltender Craig Anderson.

Vokoun was injured by teammate Keith Ballard in a game on 30 November 2009, when Ballard hit Vokoun with an errant stick in the head. Vokoun was carried off the ice on a stretcher and was treated at a nearby hospital for an ear laceration. Vokoun had just given up a goal to Ilya Kovalchuk of the Atlanta Thrashers and Ballard went to break his stick on the goal post in frustration, but caught Vokoun instead.

=== Washington and Pittsburgh (2011–2014) ===
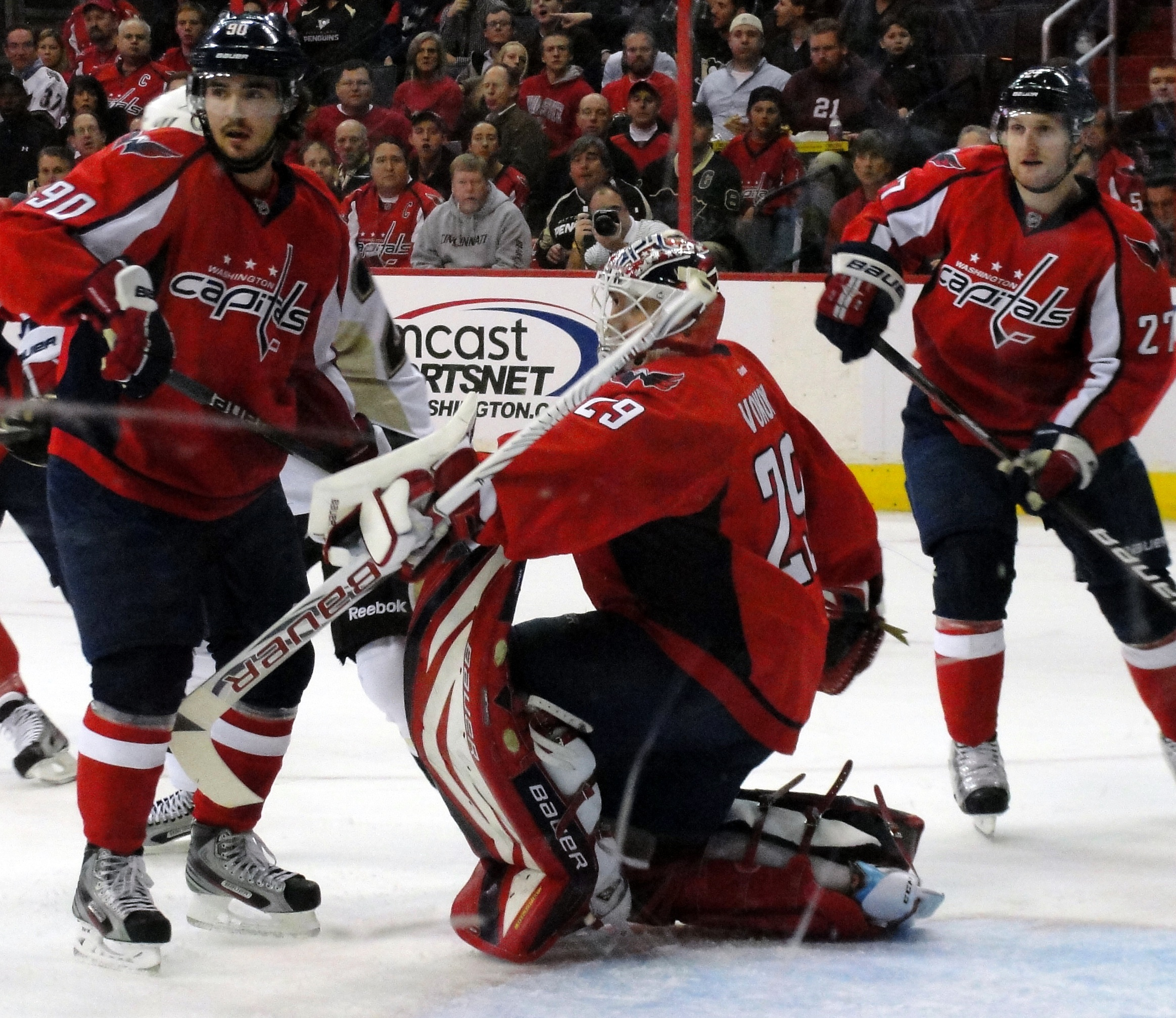
Vokoun with the Capitals in 2012.

Vokoun signed a one-year contract with the Washington Capitals on 2 July 2011 worth $1.5 million. Vokoun had a rough 2011–12 NHL season with the Capitals, as it was plagued by injury and inconsistent performance.

With Washington resorting to youngster Braden Holtby as their starting goaltender, Vokoun was traded to the Pittsburgh Penguins on 4 June 2012 in exchange for a seventh-round pick in the 2012 NHL entry draft. The following day, Vokoun signed to a two-year, $4 million contract. Since his customary sweater number 29 was being worn by Marc-André Fleury, Vokoun opted to wear number 92 with the Penguins; he became the first goaltender since Daren Puppa to wear a sweater number from 90 to 98.

On 30 March 2013, Vokoun set a personal best and Pittsburgh Penguins individual franchise record shutout streak of 187:30. He had two consecutive shutouts (on 28 March against the Winnipeg Jets and on 30 March against the New York Islanders) and a combined shutout with Marc-André Fleury on 26 March against the Montreal Canadiens. Vokoun played the third period to complete the shutout after Fleury was injured at the end of the second period. On 9 May 2013, Vokoun made his first playoff start in six seasons, a 31-save shutout against the New York Islanders in Game 5 of the Eastern Conference Quarter-finals.

Vokoun was sidelined indefinitely after undergoing surgery to dissolve another blood clot in his pelvis during the 2013 pre-season. On 21 January 2014, it was reported Vokoun would begin skating in practice again, with no timetable as to his possible return. On 15 December 2014, Vokoun announced his retirement.

== International play ==
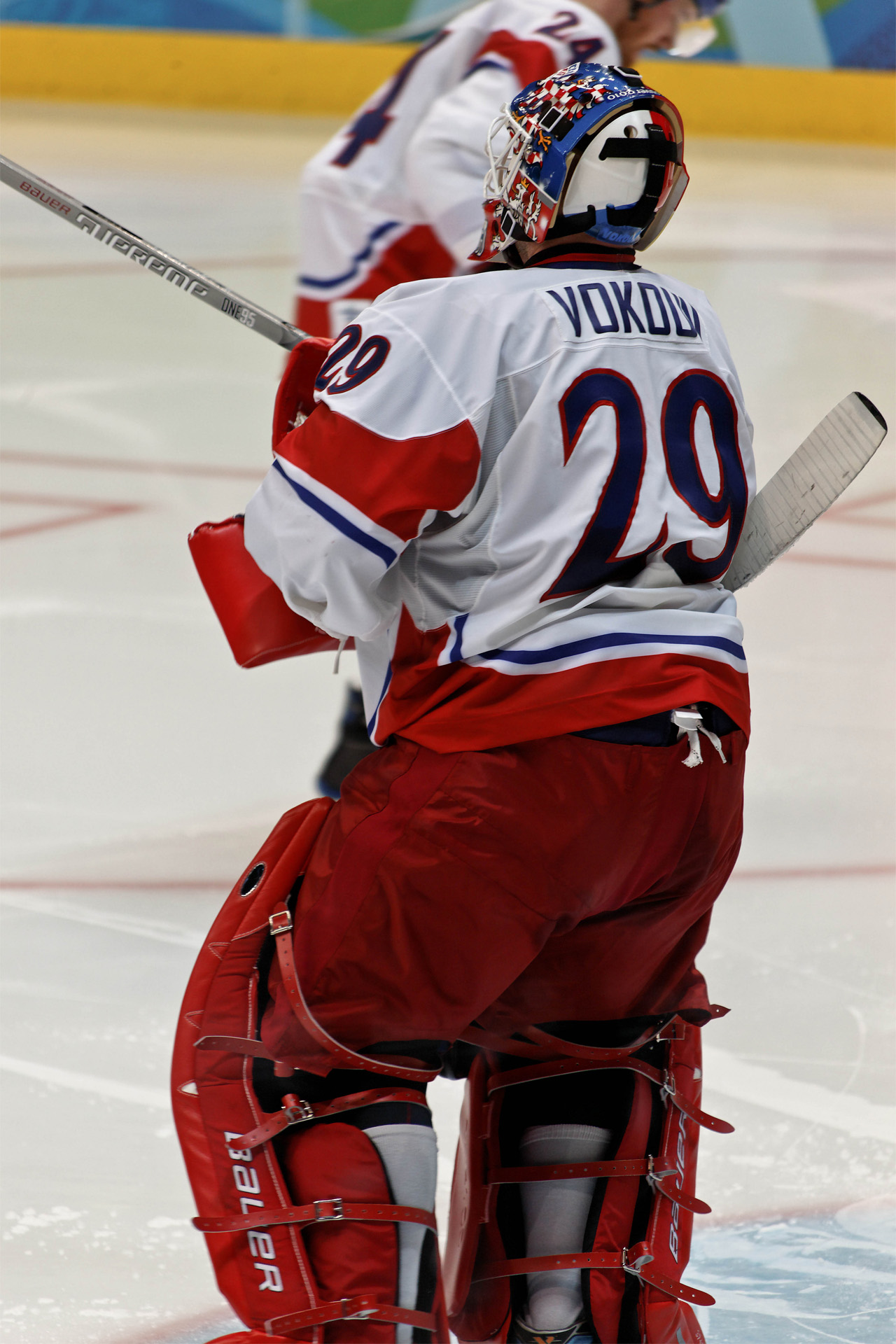
- Vokoun during the 2010 Olympics

Medal record

Representing Czech Republic

Men's ice hockey

Olympic Games
Bronze medal – third place	2006 Turin	

World Championships
Gold medal – first place	2005 Vienna	
Gold medal – first place	2010 Cologne	

World Cup
Bronze medal – third place	2004 Toronto	

European Junior Championships
Bronze medal – third place	1994 Jyväskylä	

Vokoun has represented the Czech Republic many times over the course of his playing career. His first international experience came with the under-20 team at the 1996 World Junior Ice Hockey Championships, where the Czechs finished in fourth place. His first senior experience came at the 2003 IIHF World Championship, where the Czechs again finished in fourth place. Overall, he has played for the Czechs at four IIHF World Championships, two Winter Olympic Games and also in the 2004 World Cup of Hockey. He backstopped the Czechs to a third-place finish at the World Cup, gold medals at the 2005 and 2010 World Championships and won bronze with the team at the 2006 Olympics in Turin.

== Awards and records ==
- Selected to play in the 2004 NHL All-Star Game.
- Selected to play in the 2008 NHL All-Star Game.

== Career statistics ==
=== Regular season and playoffs ===
			Regular season										Playoffs
Season	Team	League	GP	W	L	T	OTL	MIN	GA	SO	GAA	SV%	GP	W	L	MIN	GA	SO	GAA	SV%
1993–94	Poldi SONP Kladno	ELH	2	1	1	0	—	60	5	0	5.00	.839	2	2	0	120	14	0	7.00	.811
1994–95	Poldi SONP Kladno	ELH	26	13	9	4	—	1334	68	0	3.06	.915	5	2	3	241	19	0	4.75	.872
1995–96	Wheeling Thunderbirds	ECHL	35	20	10	2	—	1912	117	0	3.67	.881	7	4	3	436	19	0	2.61	.903
1995–96	Fredericton Canadiens	AHL	—	—	—	—	—	—	—	—	—	—	1	0	1	59	4	0	4.07	.879
1996–97	Montreal Canadiens	NHL	1	0	0	0	—	20	4	0	12.00	.714	—	—	—	—	—	—	—	—
1996–97	Fredericton Canadiens	AHL	47	12	26	7	—	2645	154	2	3.49	.902	—	—	—	—	—	—	—	—
1997–98	Fredericton Canadiens	AHL	31	13	13	2	—	1735	90	0	3.11	.907	—	—	—	—	—	—	—	—
1998–99	Nashville Predators	NHL	37	12	18	4	—	1954	96	1	2.95	.908	—	—	—	—	—	—	—	—
1998–99	Milwaukee Admirals	IHL	9	3	2	4	—	539	22	1	2.45	.920	2	0	2	149	8	0	3.22	.909
1999–00	Nashville Predators	NHL	33	9	20	1	—	1879	87	1	2.78	.904	—	—	—	—	—	—	—	—
1999–00	Milwaukee Admirals	IHL	7	5	2	0	—	364	17	0	2.80	.921	—	—	—	—	—	—	—	—
2000–01	Nashville Predators	NHL	37	13	17	5	—	2088	85	2	2.44	.910	—	—	—	—	—	—	—	—
2001–02	Nashville Predators	NHL	29	5	14	4	—	1471	66	2	2.69	.903	—	—	—	—	—	—	—	—
2002–03	Nashville Predators	NHL	69	25	31	11	—	3974	146	3	2.20	.918	—	—	—	—	—	—	—	—
2003–04	Nashville Predators	NHL	73	34	29	10	—	4221	178	3	2.53	.909	6	2	4	356	12	1	2.02	.939
2004–05	HC Znojemští Orli	ELH	27	10	14	3	—	1599	69	3	2.59	.927	—	—	—	—	—	—	—	—
2004–05	HIFK	SM-l	19	11	4	4	—	1149	35	2	1.83	.940	4	0	3	205	12	0	3.51	.846
2005–06	Nashville Predators	NHL	61	36	18	—	7	3600	160	4	2.67	.919	—	—	—	—	—	—	—	—
2006–07	Nashville Predators	NHL	44	27	12	—	4	2601	104	5	2.40	.920	5	1	4	323	16	0	2.96	.902
2007–08	Florida Panthers	NHL	69	30	29	—	8	4030	180	4	2.68	.919	—	—	—	—	—	—	—	—
2008–09	Florida Panthers	NHL	59	26	23	—	6	3324	138	6	2.49	.926	—	—	—	—	—	—	—	—
2009–10	Florida Panthers	NHL	63	23	28	—	11	3695	157	7	2.55	.925	—	—	—	—	—	—	—	—
2010–11	Florida Panthers	NHL	57	22	28	—	5	3224	137	6	2.55	.922	—	—	—	—	—	—	—	—
2011–12	Washington Capitals	NHL	48	25	17	—	2	2583	108	4	2.51	.917	—	—	—	—	—	—	—	—
2012–13	Pittsburgh Penguins	NHL	20	13	4	—	0	1029	42	3	2.45	.919	11	6	5	685	23	1	2.01	.933
2013–14	Wilkes–Barre/Scranton Penguins	AHL	2	1	1	—	0	124	5	0	2.41	.891	—	—	—	—	—	—	—	—
NHL totals			700	300	288	35	43	39,695	1,688	51	2.56	.917	22	9	13	1,365	51	2	2.24	.928

=== International ===
Year	Team	Event	GP	W	L	T	MIN	GA	SO	GAA	SV%
1994	Czech Republic	EJC	5	—	—	—	300	11	—	2.20	.916
1996	Czech Republic	WJC	6	2	2	2	356	21	1	3.54	.877
2003	Czech Republic	WC	7	4	1	1	389	14	1	2.16	.925
2004	Czech Republic	WC	6	5	1	0	370	7	2	1.14	.944
2004	Czech Republic	WCH	5	2	3	0	303	15	0	2.96	.881
2005	Czech Republic	WC	8	7	1	0	499	9	2	1.08	.953
2006	Czech Republic	OLY	7	3	3	0	342	14	1	2.46	.897
2010	Czech Republic	OLY	5	3	2	0	304	9	0	1.78	.936
2010	Czech Republic	WC	8	7	1	0	496	13	0	1.57	.944
Senior totals			46	31	12	1	2703	81	6	1.80	.928

Awards and achievements
Preceded by Patrik Eliáš	Golden Hockey Stick; 2010	Succeeded by Jaromír Jágr
