= Christian Bäckman =

Swedish ice hockey player (born 1980)

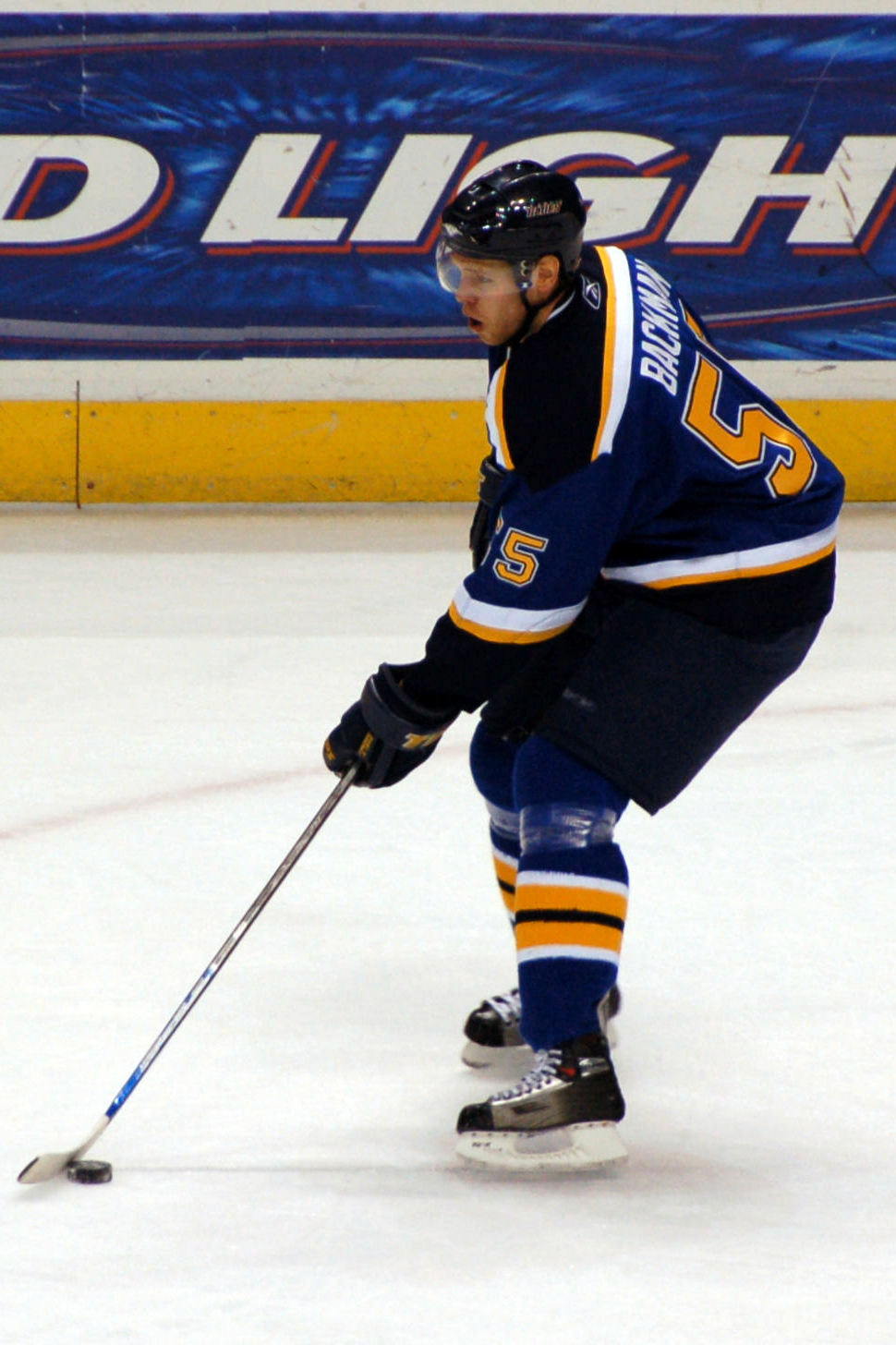
- Born: 28 April 1980 (age 46) Alingsås, Sweden
- Height: 6 ft 4 in (193 cm)
- Weight: 210 lb (95 kg; 15 st 0 lb)
- Position: Defence
- Shot: Left
- Played for: Frölunda HC; St. Louis Blues; New York Rangers; Columbus Blue Jackets
- National team: Sweden
- NHL draft: 24th overall, 1998; St. Louis Blues
- Playing career: 1998–2015

Christian Rune Bäckman (born 28 April 1980) is a Swedish former professional ice hockey defenceman. He played over 300 games in the National Hockey League (NHL) with the St. Louis Blues, New York Rangers and Columbus Blue Jackets, and spent the latter part of his career with Frölunda HC of the Swedish Hockey League (SHL).

== Playing career ==
Bäckman was drafted by St. Louis Blues in the 1998 NHL entry draft, 1st round, 24th overall. It was not until the 2002–03 NHL season that he got a contract for play in the NHL. He only played four games for St. Louis in his first season, spending the rest of the season playing for Worcester Ice Cats in the American Hockey League (AHL). Between 2003–04 and 2007–08 he was a regular for St. Louis recording 64 points (19 goals, 45 assists), and 130 penalty minutes in 228 games.

During the 2004–05 NHL lockout Bäckman played for his Swedish youth club Frölunda in Elitserien where he totalled 19 points in 50 games, winning the Elitserien playoffs.

St. Louis announced on 10 August 2006 that the club re-signed Bäckman for a multi-year contract, although no contract details were released. According to Swedish newspaper Aftonbladet the contract gave Bäckman 50 million Swedish kronor (approx. $7 million) over three years.

On 26 February 2008, Bäckman was traded to the New York Rangers in exchange for a 4th round draft pick. On 2 March 2008, in his second game as a Ranger, Bäckman scored his first goal as a Ranger on Antero Niittymäki of the Philadelphia Flyers, off assists from Brendan Shanahan and Scott Gomez.

On 2 July 2008, Bäckman was traded, along with Fedor Tyutin, to the Columbus Blue Jackets for Nikolai Zherdev and Dan Fritsche. In October 2009, Bäckman signalled the conclusion of his North American career by signing with Frölunda HC.

== Personal life ==
Bäckman was born 1980 in Alingsås. He has two siblings. He grew up in mostly Alingsås but moved to Gothenburg to start his ice hockey career.

Bäckman is married to Jeanette Bäckman. Together they have three children. He spends his off-season in Gothenburg.

== Career statistics ==
=== Regular season and playoffs ===
			Regular season					Playoffs
Season	Team	League	GP	G	A	Pts	PIM	GP	G	A	Pts	PIM
1996–97	Västra Frölunda HC	J20	26	2	5	7	16	—	—	—	—	—
1997–98	Västra Frölunda HC	J20	28	5	14	19	12	—	—	—	—	—
1998–99	Västra Frölunda HC	J20	9	0	4	4	12	—	—	—	—	—
1998–99	Västra Frölunda HC	SEL	49	0	4	4	4	4	0	0	0	0
1999–00	Västra Frölunda HC	J20	3	1	1	2	0	3	1	1	2	0
1999–00	Västra Frölunda HC	SEL	27	1	0	1	14	5	0	0	0	0
1999–00	Gislaveds SK	SWE-2	21	5	2	7	8	—	—	—	—	—
2000–01	Västra Frölunda HC	SEL	50	1	10	11	32	3	0	2	2	2
2001–02	Västra Frölunda HC	SEL	44	7	4	11	38	10	0	0	0	8
2002–03	St. Louis Blues	NHL	4	0	0	0	0	—	—	—	—	—
2002–03	Worcester IceCats	AHL	72	8	19	27	66	3	0	1	1	5
2003–04	St. Louis Blues	NHL	66	5	13	18	16	5	0	2	2	4
2003–04	Worcester IceCats	AHL	4	1	2	3	2	—	—	—	—	—
2004–05	Frölunda HC	SEL	50	4	15	19	40	14	2	7	9	10
2005–06	St. Louis Blues	NHL	52	6	12	18	48	—	—	—	—	—
2006–07	St. Louis Blues	NHL	61	7	11	18	36	—	—	—	—	—
2007–08	St. Louis Blues	NHL	45	1	9	10	30	—	—	—	—	—
2007–08	New York Rangers	NHL	18	2	6	8	20	8	0	0	0	12
2008–09	Columbus Blue Jackets	NHL	56	2	5	7	32	—	—	—	—	—
2009–10	Frölunda HC	SEL	47	10	18	28	46	7	1	2	3	6
2010–11	Frölunda HC	SEL	21	4	13	17	8	—	—	—	—	—
2011–12	Frölunda HC	SEL	55	11	16	27	48	6	0	2	2	2
2012–13	Frölunda HC	SEL	57	7	15	22	36	6	1	3	4	0
2013–14	Frölunda HC	SHL	50	2	5	7	36	7	1	1	2	2
2014–15	Frölunda HC	SHL	33	4	3	7	16	13	0	2	2	8
SEL/SHL totals			480	51	103	154	318	75	5	19	24	38
NHL totals			302	23	56	79	182	13	0	2	2	16

=== International ===
Medal record

Representing Sweden

Olympics
Gold medal – first place	2006 Turin	

World Championships
Silver medal – second place	2004 Czech Republic	
Bronze medal – third place	2010 Germany	

European Junior Championship
Gold medal – first place	1998 Sweden	
Silver medal – second place	1997 Czech Republic	

Year	Team	Event	GP	G	A	Pts	PIM
1997	Sweden	EJC18	4	0	0	0	2
1998	Sweden	EJC18	6	2	6	8	2
1999	Sweden	WJC	6	0	3	3	0
2000	Sweden	WJC	7	1	1	2	6
2004	Sweden	WC	9	1	2	3	6
2005	Sweden	WC	9	1	1	2	6
2006	Sweden	OLY	8	1	2	3	6
2010	Sweden	WC	9	0	3	3	10
Junior totals			23	3	10	13	10
Senior totals			35	3	8	11	28

== Awards and honors ==
Award	Year
SHL
All-Star Team	2005
Le Mat trophy (Frölunda HC)	2005

Awards and achievements
Preceded by Marty Reasoner	St. Louis Blues first-round draft pick 1998	Succeeded by Barret Jackman
