= 2004 National Hockey League All-Star Game =

Professional ice hockey exhibition game

2004 NHL All-Star Game
	1	2	3	Total
East	1	4	1	6
West	1	2	1	4
- Date: February 8, 2004
- Arena: Xcel Energy Center
- City: Saint Paul
- MVP: Joe Sakic (Colorado)
- Attendance: 19,434

The 2004 National Hockey League All-Star Game was held on February 8, 2004, at the Xcel Energy Center in Saint Paul, home of the Minnesota Wild. The Eastern Conference defeated the Western Conference 6–4. This was the final All-Star Game until 2007.

== All-Star weekend ==
=== Events ===
The city of Saint Paul in honor of the All Star Game being held built the Ice Castle for the first time in over 20 years at the Saint Paul Winter Carnival right across the street from the Xcel Energy Center.

=== NHL YoungStars Game ===
The YoungStars game, featuring rosters composed entirely of rookies and some second-year players, saw the Western Conference YoungStars defeat the Eastern Conference 7–3. Anaheim's Joffrey Lupul scored a hat trick, San Jose's Jonathan Cheechoo picked up four assists and Colorado goaltender Philippe Sauve was named the Game MVP, stopping 18 of 21 shots. It is notable that instead of a regular 5-on-5 hockey game, the YoungStars game is played in a four-on-four format with each roster consisting of six forwards, four defencemen, and one goaltender. The game was played in three 10-minute running-clock periods and a four-minute intermission between each period.

=== SuperSkills Competition ===
The Eastern Conference were the overall victors of the SuperSkills Competition, in which select all-stars compete in various competitions, including a shootout, a relay race and a fastest skater competition. The East defeated the West 13–6. Panthers goaltender Roberto Luongo won the Goaltenders Competition, Islanders defenceman Adrian Aucoin won the Hardest Shot competition and Devils defenceman Scott Niedermayer won the Fastest Skater competition.

==== Individual event winners ====
- Puck Control Relay – Rick Nash (Columbus Blue Jackets)
- Fastest Skater – Scott Niedermayer (New Jersey Devils) - 13.783 seconds
- Accuracy Shooting – Jeremy Roenick (Philadelphia Flyers) - 4 hits, 4 shots
- Hardest Shot – Adrian Aucoin (New York Islanders) - 102.2 mph
- Goaltenders Competition – Roberto Luongo (Florida Panthers) - 1 GA, 12 shots

== The game ==
The Eastern Conference were struck with injuries as Scott Stevens and Wade Redden were forced to pull out of the game. Brian Rafalski and Pavel Kubina replaced the defensemen, respectively, putting the starting rosters at Ilya Kovalchuk, Joe Thornton and Martin St. Louis on offense, Scott Niedermayer and Stevens injury replacement Brian Rafalski on defense and Martin Brodeur in goal for the East, and Todd Bertuzzi, Mike Modano and Bill Guerin on offense, Rob Blake and Nicklas Lidstrom on defense and Marty Turco in goal for the West.

The Eastern Conference cruised to a 6–4 victory on goals by Adrian Aucoin, Daniel Alfredsson (who scored twice), Mark Messier, Gary Roberts and Ilya Kovalchuk. However, it was Joe Sakic of the Western Conference who walked away with MVP honors as he scored a hat trick. Coyotes forward Shane Doan also scored for the West.

== Rosters ==
	Eastern Conference	Western Conference
Head coach	(Canada) Pat Quinn (Toronto Maple Leafs)	(Canada) Dave Lewis (Detroit Red Wings)
Assistant coach	(Canada) Ken Hitchcock (Philadelphia Flyers)	(Canada) Marc Crawford (Vancouver Canucks)
Lineup	Starting lineup: (Russia) 17 - LW Ilya Kovalchuk (Atlanta Thrashers); (Canada) 19 - C Joe Thornton (Boston Bruins); (Canada) 26 - RW Martin St. Louis (Tampa Bay Lightning); (Canada) 27 - D Scott Niedermayer (New Jersey Devils) - (C); (United States) 28 - D Brian Rafalski (New Jersey Devils); (Canada) 30 - G Martin Brodeur (New Jersey Devils); Reserves: (Canada) 1 - G Roberto Luongo (Florida Panthers); (Canada) 3 - D Adrian Aucoin (New York Islanders); (Canada) 7 - LW Gary Roberts (Toronto Maple Leafs); (Sweden) 9 - RW Daniel Alfredsson (Ottawa Senators); (Canada) 11 - C Mark Messier (New York Rangers); (Sweden) 13 - C Mats Sundin (Toronto Maple Leafs); (Czech Republic) 20 - C Robert Lang (Washington Capitals); (Czech Republic) 23 - D Pavel Kubina (Tampa Bay Lightning); (Canada) 25 - C Keith Primeau (Philadelphia Flyers); (Canada) 44 - D Sheldon Souray (Montreal Canadiens); (Canada) 45 - D Nick Boynton (Boston Bruins); (Canada) 60 - G Jose Theodore (Montreal Canadiens); (Czech Republic) 68 - RW Jaromir Jagr (New York Rangers); (Canada) 72 - RW Glen Murray (Boston Bruins); (United States) 97 - C Jeremy Roenick (Philadelphia Flyers)	Starting lineup: (Canada) 44 - LW Todd Bertuzzi (Vancouver Canucks); (United States) 9 - C Mike Modano (Dallas Stars); (United States) 13 - RW Bill Guerin (Dallas Stars); (Canada) 4 - D Rob Blake (Colorado Avalanche); (Sweden) 5 - D Nicklas Lidstrom (Detroit Red Wings); (Canada) 35 - G Marty Turco (Dallas Stars); Reserves: (United States) 7 - LW Keith Tkachuk (St. Louis Blues); (Canada) 12 - RW Jarome Iginla (Calgary Flames); (Sweden) 14 - D Mattias Norstrom (Los Angeles Kings); (Czech Republic) 17 - D Filip Kuba (Minnesota Wild); (Canada) 19 - C Joe Sakic (Colorado Avalanche); (Canada) 20 - RW Shane Doan (Phoenix Coyotes); (Canada) 21 - C Patrick Marleau (San Jose Sharks); (Canada) 24 - D Chris Pronger (St. Louis Blues); (Russia) 26 - C Pavel Datsyuk (Detroit Red Wings); (Czech Republic) 29 - G Tomas Vokoun (Nashville Predators); (Canada) 30 - G Dwayne Roloson (Minnesota Wild); (Canada) 40 - LW Alex Tanguay (Colorado Avalanche); (Finland) 45 - D Kimmo Timonen (Nashville Predators); (Canada) 61 - LW Rick Nash (Columbus Blue Jackets); (Sweden) 91 - LW Markus Naslund (Vancouver Canucks) - (C)

== Uniforms ==
For the first time, the NHL used All-Star uniforms inspired by the host team, and opted to go with a retro flavor. The uniforms were distinct for the lack of white - the Eastern Conference uniforms were cream-colored (officially the Minnesota Wild's "Minnesota Wheat" color) with red trim, while the Western Conference wore green jerseys with cream trim. In a departure from the overall retro theme of the uniforms, the names on the back of the jersey were in the Kabel typeface used by the Toronto Maple Leafs at the time.

== Summary ==
	Eastern Conference	Western Conference
Final score	6	4
Scoring summary	Aucoin (Jagr, Messier) 5:44 1st; Alfredsson (unassisted) 0:51 2nd; Messier (Niedermayer, Lang) 13:48 2nd; Roberts (Alfredsson, Sundin) 14:41 2nd; Alfredsson (2) (Sundin, Roberts) 18:04 2nd (GWG); Kovalchuk (Souray) 4:03 3rd	Sakic (Naslund, Bertuzzi) 13:37 1st; Sakic (2) (Naslund, Bertuzzi) 5:44 2nd; Doan (Lidstrom, Tkachuk) 13:02 2nd; Sakic (3) (Naslund) 7:22 3rd
Penalties	none	none
Shots on goal	10–12–7–29	11–12–9–32
Win/loss	W - Jose Theodore	L - Tomas Vokoun

- Referees: Blaine Angus, Stephen Walkom
- Linesmen: Scott Driscoll, Thor Nelson
- Television: ABC, CBC, SRC

== Notes ==
- ^1 Scott Stevens was voted as a starter, but was unable to play due to injury. Brian Rafalski was selected as his replacement in the starting lineup.
- ^2 Wade Redden was selected, but was unable to play due to injury. Pavel Kubina was named as his replacement.
- ^3 Marian Hossa was selected, but was unable to play due to injury. Glen Murray was selected as his replacement.
