= 1994 IIHF European U18 Championship =

The 1994 IIHF European U18 Championship was the twenty-seventh playing of the IIHF European Junior Championships.

== Group A ==
Played from April 17 to the 24th in Jyväskylä, Finland.

=== First round ===
Group 1

Team	SWE	FIN	SUI	NOR	GF/GA	Points
1. Sweden		6:3	6:2	15:0	27:5	6
2. Finland	3:6		8:2	5:1	16:9	4
3. Switzerland	2:6	2:8		3:3	7:17	1
4. Norway	0:15	1:5	3:3		4:23	1

Group 2

Team	CZE	RUS	GER	POL	GF/GA	Points
1. Czech Republic		3:3	7:2	13:0	23:5	5
2. Russia	3:3		8:4	8:2	19:9	5
3. Germany	2:7	4:8		13:2	19:17	2
4. Poland	0:13	2:8	2:13		4:34	0

=== Final round ===
Championship round

Team	SWE	RUS	CZE	FIN	GF/GA	Points
1. Sweden		4:4	5:2	(6:3)	15:9	5
2. Russia	4:4		(3:3)	4:2	11:9	4
3. Czech Republic	2:5	(3:3)		6:1	11:9	3
4. Finland	(3:6)	2:4	1:6		6:16	0

Placing round

Team	SUI	GER	NOR	POL	GF/GA	Points
1. Switzerland		7:2	(3:3)	6:1	16:6	5
2. Germany	2:7		5:3	(13:2)	20:12	4
3. Norway	(3:3)	3:5		5:5	11:13	2
4. Poland	1:6	(2:13)	5:5		8:24	1

Poland was relegated to Group B for 1995.

== Tournament Awards ==
- Top Scorer (Russia) Dmitri Klevakin (13 points)
- Top Goalie: (Czech Republic) Tomáš Vokoun
- Top Defenceman: (Sweden) Mattias Öhlund
- Top Forward: (Sweden) Johan Davidsson

== Group B ==
Played from March 28 until April 3, 1994, in Székesfehérvár, Hungary.

=== First round ===
Group

Team	AUT	BLR	ITA	ROM	GF/GA	Points
1. Austria		7:4	6:2	5:2	18:8	6
2. Belarus	4:7		2:2	9:1	15:10	3
3. Italy	2:6	2:2		3:0	7:8	3
4. Romania	2:5	1:9	0:3		3:17	0

Group 2

Team	HUN	DEN	FRA	ESP	GF/GA	Points
1. Hungary		3:2	6:3	16:0	25:5	6
2. Denmark	2:3		7:5	11:1	20:9	4
3. France	3:6	5:7		7:4	15:17	2
4. Spain	0:16	1:11	4:7		5:34	0

=== Final round ===
Championship round

Team	BLR	HUN	DEN	AUT	GF/GA	Points
1. Belarus		5:3	7:5	(4:7)	16:15	4
2. Hungary	3:5		(3:2)	7:2	13:9	4
3. Denmark	5:7	(2:3)		6:1	13:11	2
4. Austria	(7:4)	2:7	1:6		10:17	2

Placing round

Team	ITA	ROM	FRA	ESP	GF/GA	Points
1. Italy		(3:0)	4:1	6:0	13:1	6
2. Romania	(0:3)		3:3	7:2	10:8	3
3. France	1:4	3:3		(7:4)	11:11	3
4. Spain	0:6	2:7	(4:7)		6:20	0

Belarus was promoted to Group A and Spain was relegated to Group C1 for 1995.

== Group C ==
Played from March 18 to the 27th, 1994 in Bled, Slovenia.

=== First round ===
Group 1

Team	LAT	UKR	GBR	CRO	BUL	GF/GA	Points
1. Latvia		6:5	15:0	15:1	38:0	74:6	8
2. Ukraine	5:6		22:2	16:0	20:0	63:8	6
3. Great Britain	0:15	2:22		3:2	15:1	20:40	4
4. Croatia	1:15	0:16	2:3		13:1	16:35	2
5. Bulgaria	0:38	0:20	1:15	1:13		2:86	0

Group 2

Team	SVK	SLO	EST	LTU	NED	GF/GA	Points
1. Slovakia		11:1	34:0	24:3	29:4	98:8	8
2. Slovenia	1:11		11:0	10:1	13:1	35:13	6
3. Estonia	0:34	0:11		5:2	7:2	12:49	4
4. Lithuania	3:24	1:10	2:5		8:2	14:41	2
5. Netherlands	4:29	1:13	2:7	2:8		9:57	0

=== Final round ===
Championship round

Team	SVK	LAT	SLO	UKR	GF/GA	Points
1. Slovakia		9:4	(11:1)	4:2	24:7	6
2. Latvia	4:9		7:0	(6:5)	17:14	4
3. Slovenia	(1:11)	0:7		4:2	5:20	2
4. Ukraine	2:4	(5:6)	2:4		9:14	0

Placing round

Team	EST	GBR	LTU	CRO	GF/GA	Points
1. Estonia		11:4	(5:2)	4:3	20:9	6
2. Great Britain	4:11		5:4	(3:2)	12:17	4
3. Lithuania	(2:5)	4:5		7:4	13:14	2
4. Croatia	3:4	(2:3)	4:7		9:14	0

9th place

Netherlands	6:2 (2:0, 2:1, 2:1)	Bulgaria

Slovakia was promoted to Group B for 1995. Lithuania, Croatia, the Netherlands, and Bulgaria were in essence relegated, as Group C would be divided into two tiers for 1995.
