= Don Van Massenhoven =

Canadian ice hockey referee

Dan Van Massenhoven
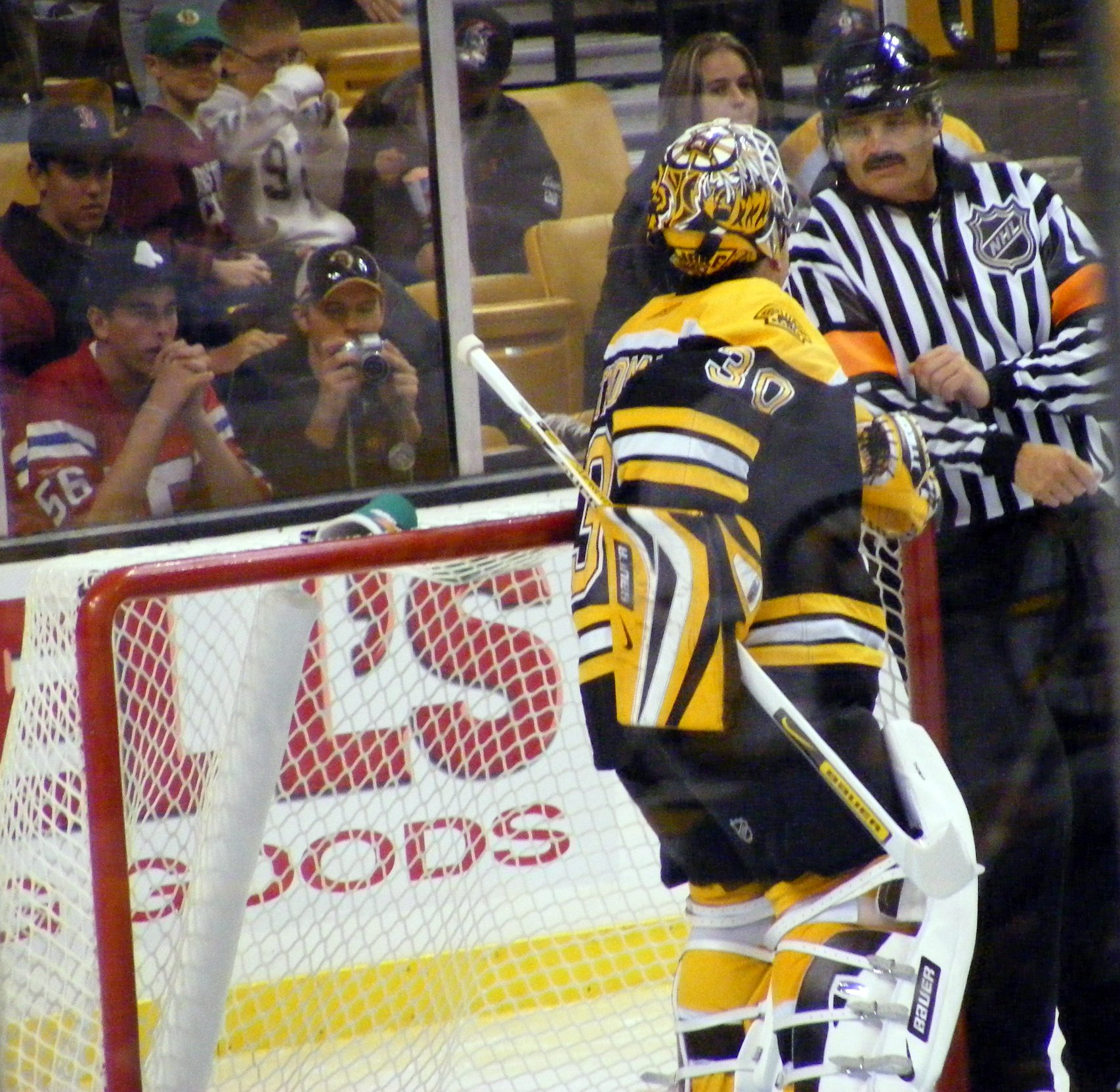
- Don Van Massenhoven (right) with Tim Thomas in 2008
- Born: July 17, 1960 (age 65); Strathroy, Ontario, Canada

Don Van Massenhoven (born July 17, 1960) is a Canadian retired National Hockey League referee whose career started during the 1993–94 NHL season. He wore uniform number 21.

== Career ==
Before he became an NHL referee, Van Massenhoven was a police officer. During the 2004–05 NHL lockout, he was a car salesman in his hometown of Strathroy, Ontario.

Van Massenhoven was one of two referees (Dan O'Halloran was the other) during a November 21, 2005, game between the Nashville Predators and the Detroit Red Wings at the Joe Louis Arena where Jiri Fischer suddenly suffered a seizure and went into cardiac arrest. The game was later postponed because of what happened and was made up on January 23, 2006.

Van Massenhoven officiated his last game on April 4, 2014, between the Buffalo Sabres and the Detroit Red Wings. It was at his request to work his final game at Joe Louis Arena. He officiated 1,366 games over his career.
