= Marek Židlický =

Czech ice hockey player (born 1977)

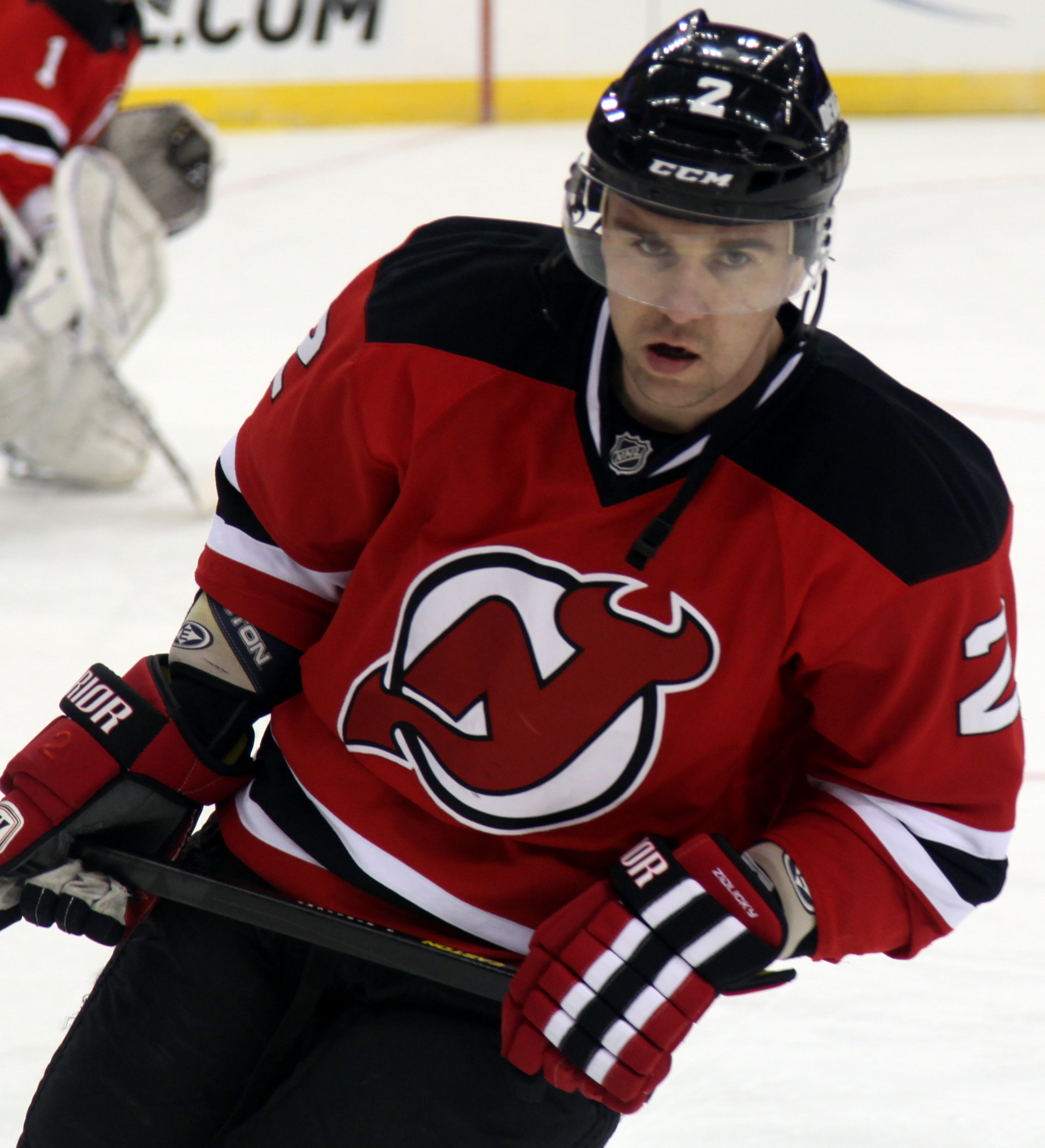
- Židlický with the New Jersey Devils in 2013
- Born: 3 February 1977 (age 49) Most, Czechoslovakia
- Height: 5 ft 11 in (180 cm)
- Weight: 190 lb (86 kg; 13 st 8 lb)
- Position: Defence
- Shot: Right
- Played for: HC Kladno; Helsingin IFK; Nashville Predators; Minnesota Wild; New Jersey Devils; Detroit Red Wings; New York Islanders
- National team: Czech Republic
- NHL draft: 176th overall, 2001; New York Rangers
- Playing career: 1994–2016

Marek Židlický (Czech pronunciation: [ˈmarɛk ˈʒɪdlɪtskiː]; born 3 February 1977) is a Czech former professional ice hockey player who played in the National Hockey League (NHL). He was selected in the sixth round, 176th overall, by the New York Rangers in the 2001 NHL entry draft.

== Playing career ==
Marek Židlický was selected 176th overall, in the sixth round of the 2001 NHL entry draft on June 24, 2001. He was selected as the sixth choice of the New York Rangers. Židlický had a very strong 2000–01 season with HIFK of the Finnish SM-liiga, ranking third on his team in assists (25) and tied for second on his team in points (37). He also led the league in points by a defenceman. This was enough for the Rangers to draft him in the NHL entry draft that next summer.

Židlický and the Rangers, however, could never agree to contract terms. The major sticking point was that Židlický wanted a one-way contract which would pay him the same amount of money regardless of whether he was playing in the NHL or the American Hockey League (AHL). He wanted this contract because he was worried about the depth of the Rangers and did not want to spend too much time in the minor leagues. The Rangers, however, would not agree to such a deal and only offered a two-way contract, one that would pay him at a lower rate if he played in the AHL. Because of these contract differences, Židlický opted to stay in Finland and continue playing for HIFK.

Židlický had two more very strong years for HIFK leading the team in points in 2001–02 with 40 points. The next season, he tied for the team lead in points with 47. Realizing that Židlický would not come to North America to play without a one-way contract and unwilling to give him one, the Rangers traded him, along with Rem Murray and Tomáš Klouček, for goaltender Mike Dunham on December 12, 2002, to the Nashville Predators.

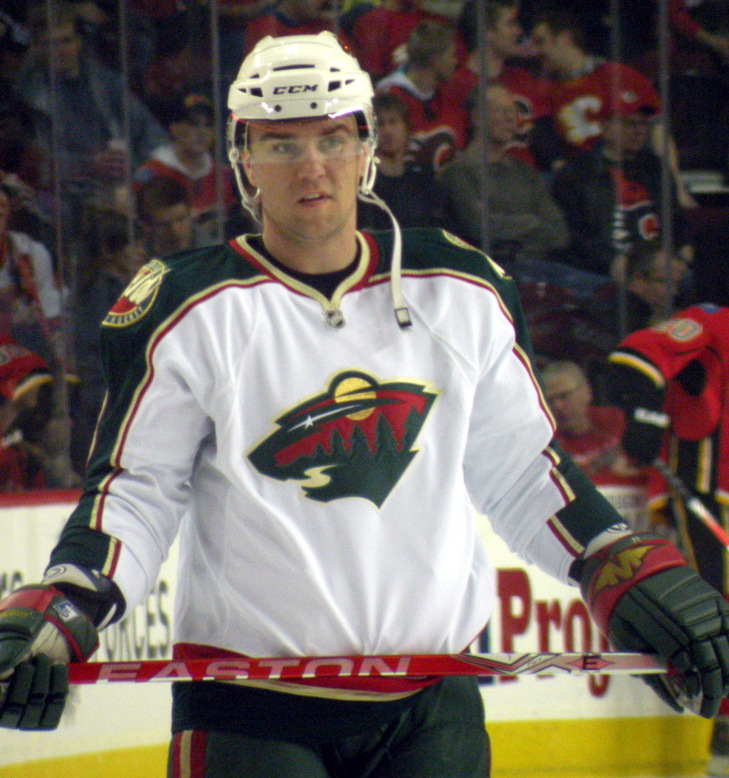
Židlický as a member of the Minnesota Wild

Židlický joined the Predators in Nashville for the 2003–04 season, which proved to be a very successful season for Židlický. He recorded his first NHL point in his NHL debut on October 10, 2003, in a 3–1 win over the Mighty Ducks of Anaheim. He scored his first NHL goal the next day in the second period of a 3–1 loss to the Dallas Stars. He became the first Predator to play all 82 games in his first season in the league (he was not considered a rookie because of his age).

Židlický was injured when he was checked in the opening minutes of the first ever Predators playoff game against the Detroit Red Wings. He suffered a concussion and was unable to return for any more games in the playoff series. During the 2004–05 NHL lockout, Židlický returned to play for HIFK in Helsinki. On May 8, 2006, it was announced that the Predators and Židlický had agreed on terms for a new four-year contract worth $13.5 million.

On July 1, 2008, Židlický was traded to the Minnesota Wild for Ryan Jones and a second-round draft pick in the 2009 NHL entry draft. During his second season with the Wild, Židlický was re-signed to a three-year contract extension on March 2, 2010.

On February 24, 2012, Židlický was traded to the New Jersey Devils from the Minnesota Wild in exchange for Kurtis Foster, Nick Palmieri, Stephane Veilleux, a Washington Capitals' second-round draft pick in 2012 and a conditional pick in 2013. In July 2013, he was re-signed by the Devils. On June 3, 2014, Zidlicky was re-signed by the Devils to a one-year contract worth $3 million, plus $1 million with incentives.

On March 2, 2015, the Devils traded Židlický to the Detroit Red Wings for a conditional third-round pick in the 2016 NHL Draft. Initially, the Red Wings were nearing a trade with the Toronto Maple Leafs for captain Dion Phaneuf, however, the deal fell through at the last minute, forcing the Red Wings to look elsewhere for a defenceman. The Red Wings were in need of a veteran right-handed shot to fit in on their powerplay, and Židlický filled this quota almost immediately after arriving in Detroit. During his first game with the Red Wings on March 4, Židlický scored the game-winning overtime goal, in a 2–1 win over the New York Rangers.

On September 18, 2015, Židlický signed as a free agent to a one-year contract with the New York Islanders.

== Records ==
- Nashville Predators franchise record for assists in a game (5)
- Nashville Predators franchise record for power play points in a season (35)

== Career statistics ==
=== Regular season and playoffs ===
			Regular season					Playoffs
Season	Team	League	GP	G	A	Pts	PIM	GP	G	A	Pts	PIM
1994–95	Poldi SONP Kladno	ELH	30	2	2	4	36	11	1	1	2	12
1995–96	HC Poldi Kladno	ELH	37	4	5	9	74	7	1	1	2	8
1996–97	HC Poldi Kladno	ELH	49	5	16	21	60	2	0	0	0	0
1997–98	HC Velvana Kladno	ELH	51	2	13	15	119	—	—	—	—	—
1998–99	HC Velvana Kladno	ELH	50	10	12	22	92	—	—	—	—	—
1999–2000	HIFK	SM-l	47	4	16	20	66	9	3	2	5	24
2000–01	HIFK	SM-l	51	12	25	37	146	5	0	1	1	6
2001–02	HIFK	SM-l	56	11	29	40	107	—	—	—	—	—
2002–03	HIFK	SM-l	54	10	37	47	79	4	0	0	0	4
2003–04	Nashville Predators	NHL	82	14	39	53	82	1	0	0	0	0
2004–05	HIFK	SM-l	49	11	20	31	91	5	0	3	3	14
2005–06	Nashville Predators	NHL	67	12	37	49	82	2	0	1	1	2
2006–07	Nashville Predators	NHL	79	4	26	30	72	5	0	2	2	4
2007–08	Nashville Predators	NHL	79	5	38	43	63	6	0	3	3	8
2008–09	Minnesota Wild	NHL	76	12	30	42	76	—	—	—	—	—
2009–10	Minnesota Wild	NHL	78	6	37	43	67	—	—	—	—	—
2010–11	Minnesota Wild	NHL	46	7	17	24	30	—	—	—	—	—
2011–12	Minnesota Wild	NHL	41	0	14	14	24	—	—	—	—	—
2011–12	New Jersey Devils	NHL	22	2	6	8	10	24	1	8	9	22
2012–13	Rytíři Kladno	ELH	25	3	22	25	28	—	—	—	—	—
2012–13	New Jersey Devils	NHL	48	4	15	19	38	—	—	—	—	—
2013–14	New Jersey Devils	NHL	81	12	30	42	60	—	—	—	—	—
2014–15	New Jersey Devils	NHL	63	4	19	23	42	—	—	—	—	—
2014–15	Detroit Red Wings	NHL	21	3	8	11	14	6	0	0	0	4
2015–16	New York Islanders	NHL	53	4	12	16	20	5	0	1	1	4
ELH totals			242	26	70	96	409	20	2	2	4	20
SM-l totals			257	48	127	175	489	23	3	6	9	48
NHL totals			836	89	328	417	680	49	1	15	16	44

=== International ===
Medal record

Representing Czech Republic

Olympic Games
Bronze medal – third place	2006 Turin	

World Championships
Gold medal – first place	2005 Vienna	
Bronze medal – third place	2011 Bratislava	

Year	Team	Event	GP	G	A	Pts	PIM
1995	Czech Republic	WJC	7	0	2	2	31
1996	Czech Republic	WJC	7	0	5	5	12
2004	Czech Republic	WCH	5	3	1	4	2
2005	Czech Republic	WC	9	1	3	4	18
2006	Czech Republic	OG	7	4	1	5	16
2007	Czech Republic	WC	7	1	5	6	6
2008	Czech Republic	WC	7	1	4	5	6
2009	Czech Republic	WC	7	0	1	1	6
2010	Czech Republic	OG	5	0	5	5	2
2011	Czech Republic	WC	9	1	4	5	6
2013	Czech Republic	WC	2	0	0	0	0
2014	Czech Republic	OG	5	2	2	4	8
Junior totals			14	0	7	7	43
Senior totals			63	13	26	39	70
