= Thor Nelson =

American ice hockey official

Thor Eric Nelson (born January 6, 1968, in Westminster, California but grew up in Minot, North Dakota) is an American former National Hockey League linesman, who wore uniform number 80. He has worked the Stanley Cup Playoffs, the 2004 NHL All-Star Game, 2006 Winter Olympics and the 2010 Olympics. Nelson retired in 2013, under doctors' orders due to post-concussion syndrome.
