= Dan Marouelli =

Canadian ice hockey official (born 1955)

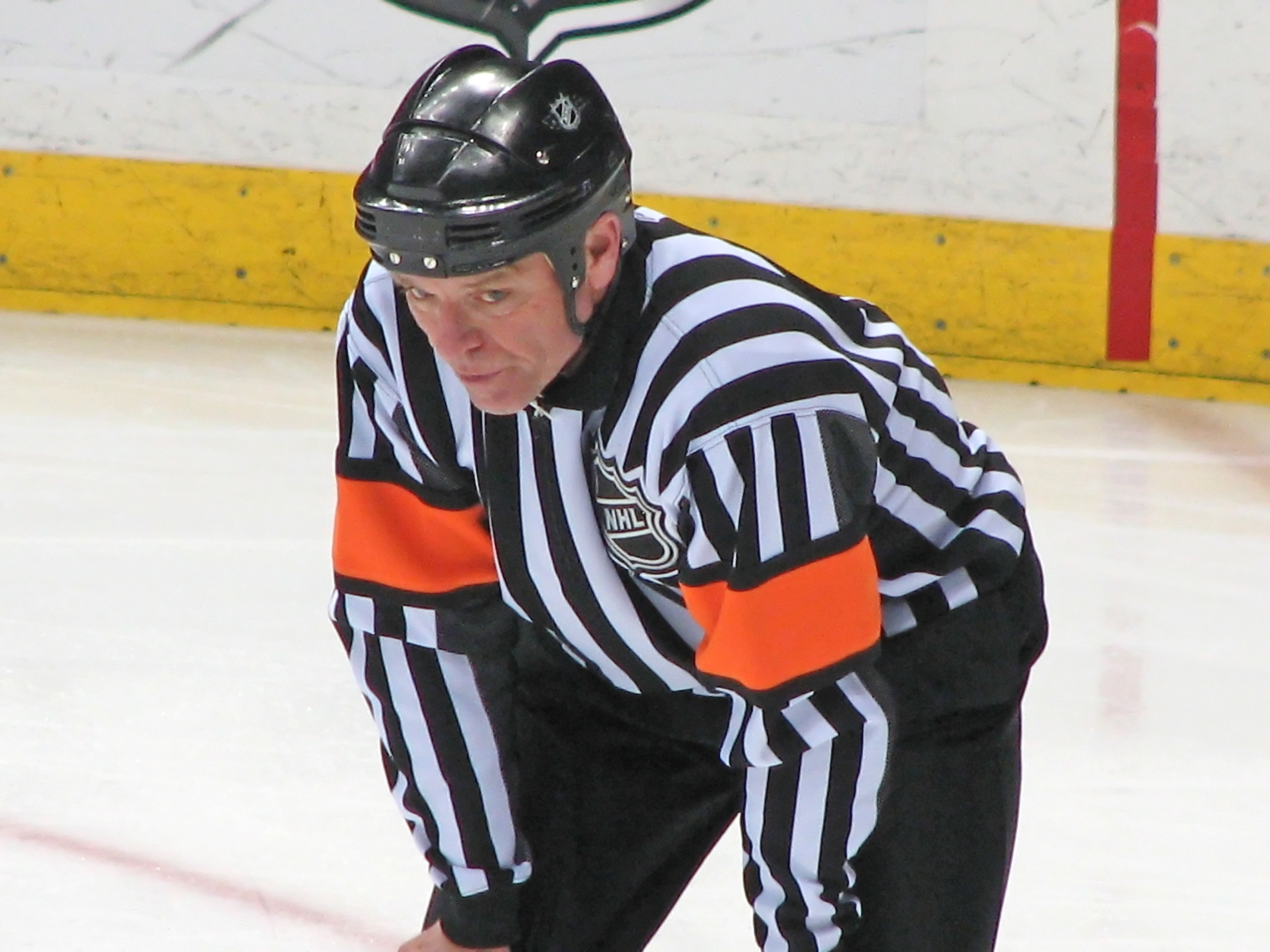
- Marouelli refereeing a game between the Edmonton Oilers and Ducks in 2007
- Born: Dan Marouelli; July 16, 1955 (age 70); Edmonton, Alberta, Canada
- Occupation: National Hockey League referee

Dan Marouelli (born July 16, 1955, in Edmonton, Alberta) is a former National Hockey League referee, who wore uniform number 6 from the 1994–95 NHL season until his retirement.

== Career ==
Marouelli's NHL career started on November 2, 1984, and wore a helmet while refereeing NHL games starting from the 1996–97 NHL season.

On November 29, 2008, he officiated his 1,500th game between the Toronto Maple Leafs and Philadelphia Flyers. On April 10, 2010, he officiated his last NHL game, between the Toronto Maple Leafs and Montreal Canadiens. At the conclusion of the game, both teams showed their appreciation for his long career by shaking his hand. In total, he officiated 1,622 regular season games and 187 playoff games.

In August 2010, Marouelli signed as an assistant coach with the Penetang Kings of the Georgian Mid-Ontario Junior C Hockey League.
