= Jeeno Thitikul =

Thai professional golfer (born 2003)

Jeeno Thitikul อาฒยา ฐิติกุล
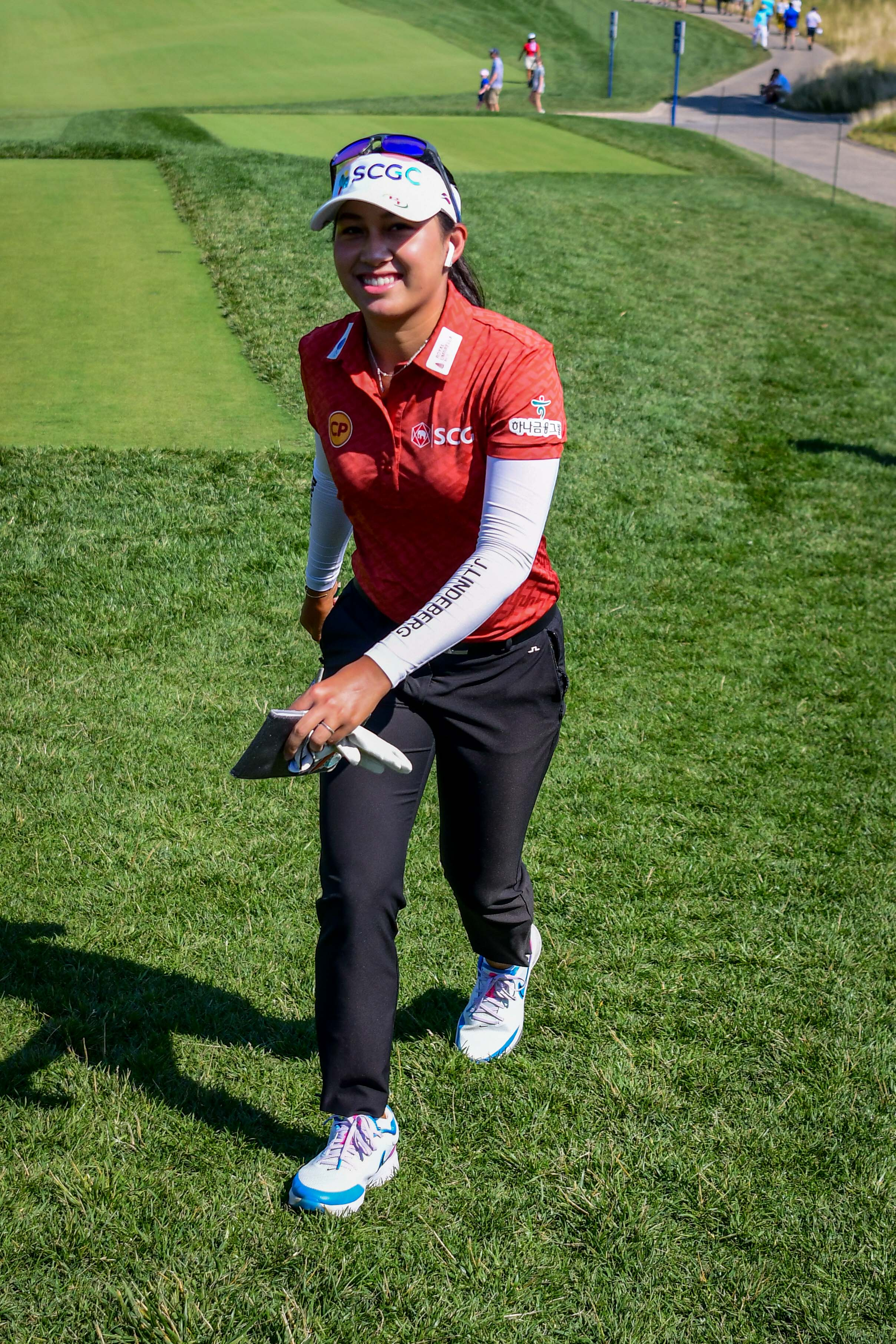
- Thitikul in 2022

Personal information
- Nickname: Jeen / Jeeno
- Nationality: Thailand
- Born: 20 February 2003 (age 23) Ban Pong district, Ratchaburi, Thailand
- Height: 1.62 m (5 ft 4 in)

Career
- Sport: Golf
- Turned professional: 2020
- Current tours: Ladies European Tour (joined 2020); LPGA Tour (joined 2022)
- Professional wins: 25

Number of wins by tour
- LPGA Tour: 12
- Ladies European Tour: 5
- Ladies Asian Golf Tour: 1
- Other: 9

Best results in LPGA major championships
- Chevron Championship: T4: 2023
- Women's PGA C'ship: 4th/T4: 2022, 2025
- U.S. Women's Open: T6: 2024
- Women's British Open: T4: 2026
- Evian Championship: 2nd: 2025

Achievements and awards
- LPGA Tour Money Winner: 2024, 2025, 2026
- LPGA Tour Player of the Year: 2025
- LPGA Vare Trophy: 2023, 2025
- AON Risk Reward Challenge: 2024
- LPGA Tour Rookie of the Year: 2022
- Ladies European Tour Player of the Year: 2021
- Ladies European Tour Order of Merit: 2021
- Ladies European Tour Rookie of the Year: 2021
- Thai LPGA Tour Order of Merit: 2020
- GWAA Female Player of the Year: 2025
Medal record
Women's golf
Representing Thailand
Youth Olympic Games
Gold medal – first place	2018 Buenos Aires	Mixed team
SEA Games
Gold medal – first place	2017 Kuala Lumpur	Individual
Gold medal – first place	2017 Kuala Lumpur	Team
Bronze medal – third place	2019 Philippines	Team

Atthaya "Jeeno" Thitikul (Thai: อาฒยา ฐิติกุล, RTGS: Atthaya Thitikun, pronounced [ʔàːt.tʰā.jāː tʰì(ʔ).tì(ʔ).kūn]; born 20 February 2003) is a Thai professional golfer who plays on the U.S.-based LPGA Tour and the Ladies European Tour. Until 2023, she was the youngest golfer ever to win a professional golf tournament at aged 14 years, 4 months and 19 days after winning the Ladies European Thailand Championship as an amateur on 9 July 2017. She was the number one ranked women's amateur golfer in the world for a total of 12 weeks, rising to the top on two occasions, the first time on 26 June 2019.

On 27 March 2022, Thitikul won for the first time on the LPGA Tour at the JTBC Classic. While still age 19 in September 2022, Thitikul had two wins on the professional LPGA Tour and four wins on the Ladies European Tour.

On 31 October 2022, Thitikul became the number one ranked golfer in the Women's World Golf Rankings, and was considered to be the fastest rising star in golf at the time. On 10 November, she was named the 2022 LPGA Tour Rookie of the Year.

In November 2024 and 2025, she won the CME Group Tour Championship, earning a prize of $4 million each year, while also leading the LPGA money list in 2025, and recording the lowest scoring average in LPGA history (68.68) – her second time winning the Vare Trophy (2023).

Thitikul returned to the number one position of the Women's World Golf Rankings in August 2025.

== Early life ==
Thitikul was born on 20 February 2003 in Ban Pong, Ratchaburi, to Montree and Siriwan Thitikul. She began playing golf at age six after her father offered her a choice between golf and tennis. After viewing both sports on YouTube, she chose golf.

Thitikul attended Sarasas Witaed Nakhonpathom School in Nakhon Pathom, from which she later graduated. She has been known by the nicknames "Jeen" and "Jeeno".

== Amateur career ==
=== 2017 ===
On 23 February, 3 days after her 14th birthday, Thitikul made her first appearance at the Honda LPGA Thailand on the LPGA Tour, where she finished 37th out of the 66 competitors. She had earned her place in the field when she finished runner-up in the Thailand Amateur Open the previous August when she was just 13 years and 6 months old. After competing in the LPGA event, she won the Taiwan Amateur Open in June.

Her emergence onto the international golf scene came with her victory at Ladies European Thailand Championship on the Ladies European Tour as an amateur on 9 July. This win made her the youngest person ever to win a professional golf tour event at age 14 years, 4 months and 19 days old. She held the record until April 2023, when Louise Uma Landgraf won the Terre Blanche Ladies Open aged 14 years, 2 months and 18 days. The previous record belonged to Canadian Brooke Henderson who won the 2012 Canadian Women's Tour aged 14 years, 9 months, and 3 days. Her amateur status meant that she could not claim the first prize of 45,000 euros for winning but it gave her the entries into both the Women's British Open and the Evian Championship in France. She missed the cut at the British Open by a shot but made the cut at the Evian Championship, playing the final two rounds and finishing in 64th place.

Thitikul also competed at the Junior Dutch Open in July. In the final round, she carded a course-record 8-under-par round to win the tournament by eight clear shots. In August, she won an individual gold medal and was part of the Thailand team that won another gold in the team event at the SEA Games in Malaysia.

=== 2018 ===
In February, Thitikul competed in the Women's Amateur Asia-Pacific Championship in Singapore, just as she turned 15. She was part of a four-way tie in the final round but went onto to win the title. Her victory earned her a place in the HSBC Women's Champions on the same course, plus entries into the ANA Inspiration at Mission Hills, California and for a place in the British Open, for a second year running.

At the HSBC event, she was the joint youngest starter of the championship at 15 years and 9 months, the exact same age at which Singapore's Amanda Tan competed in 2014. She carded a bogey-free final round of six-under par 66 to finish tied for eighth. At the ANA Inspiration in March, she finished in a tie for 30th place and earned low amateur honours.

In August, she was the only amateur to make the cut at the Woman's British Open and won the Smyth Salver, low amateur award. On 15 September, she broke the course record at World Junior Girls Championship on Camelot Golf and Country Club in Ottawa with a score of 12-under-par 60 in the final round to win the title by 2 strokes.

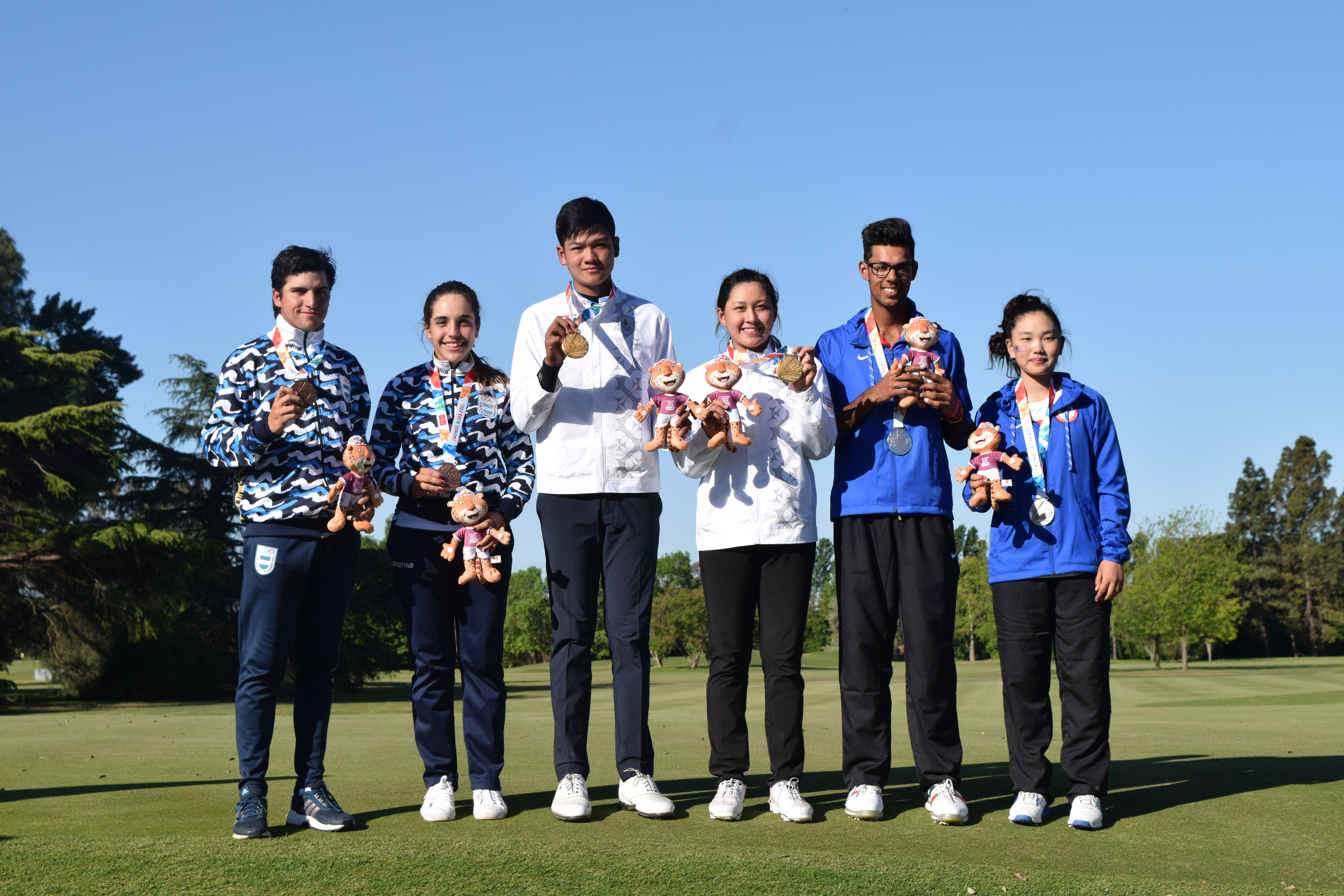
Thitikul (third from right) in the victory ceremony at the 2018 Summer Youth Olympics

At the 2018 Summer Youth Olympics in Buenos Aires, Thitikul teamed with Vanchai Luangnitikul to win the mixed team gold medal for Thailand.

=== 2019 ===
On 24 June, Thitikul won the Ladies European Thailand Championship for the second time in three years. She finished with a five-under-par 67 to win by five shots from Esther Henseleit. Following her win, Thitikul was ranked 1st in the world on the women's World Amateur Golf Ranking on 26 June and then again from October 2019 until January 2020 before turning professional. In August, she won the back-to-back Smyth Salver, low amateur honour, at the Women's British Open after finishing in a tie for 29th place at Woburn. In December, she represented Thailand at the 2019 SEA Games. She won a bronze medal in the women's team event.

== Professional career ==
=== 2020 ===
Thitikul began her professional career in January 2020, competing in several events held in Australia. One notable performance included a fourth-place finish at the Women's NSW Open.

The global COVID-19 pandemic caused a pause in the golf season, but after its resumption in July, Thitikul secured her first professional victory at the Thai LPGA Tour's 3rd Singha-SAT Thai LPGA Championship. Her season culminated in five total wins on the Thai LPGA Tour, while securing the top spot on the tour's money list.

=== 2021 ===
In May, Thitikul finished runner-up at the Honda LPGA Thailand, one stroke behind Ariya Jutanugarn.

On 27 June, Thitikul won the Tipsport Czech Ladies Open for her third Ladies European Tour title and her first as a professional. The following month, she finished fifth at the Evian Championship, then the best result of her career in a major championship.

In August, Thitikul tied for second at the Trust Golf Women's Scottish Open, marking her seventh consecutive top-five finish in a Ladies European Tour event. In September, she won the VP Bank Swiss Ladies Open, her fourth LET title and second victory of the season. She overcame a four-stroke deficit after 36 holes to defeat Marianne Skarpnord by one stroke.

Thitikul finished her first full LET season with two victories, three runner-up finishes and nine additional top-ten finishes. She won both the Race to Costa del Sol and the Rookie of the Year award, becoming the youngest winner of the season-long ranking and the fourth player to win both honors in the same season. She was also named the Players' Player of the Year.

In December, Thitikul finished third at LPGA Q-Series, earning LPGA Tour membership for the 2022 season.

=== 2022 ===
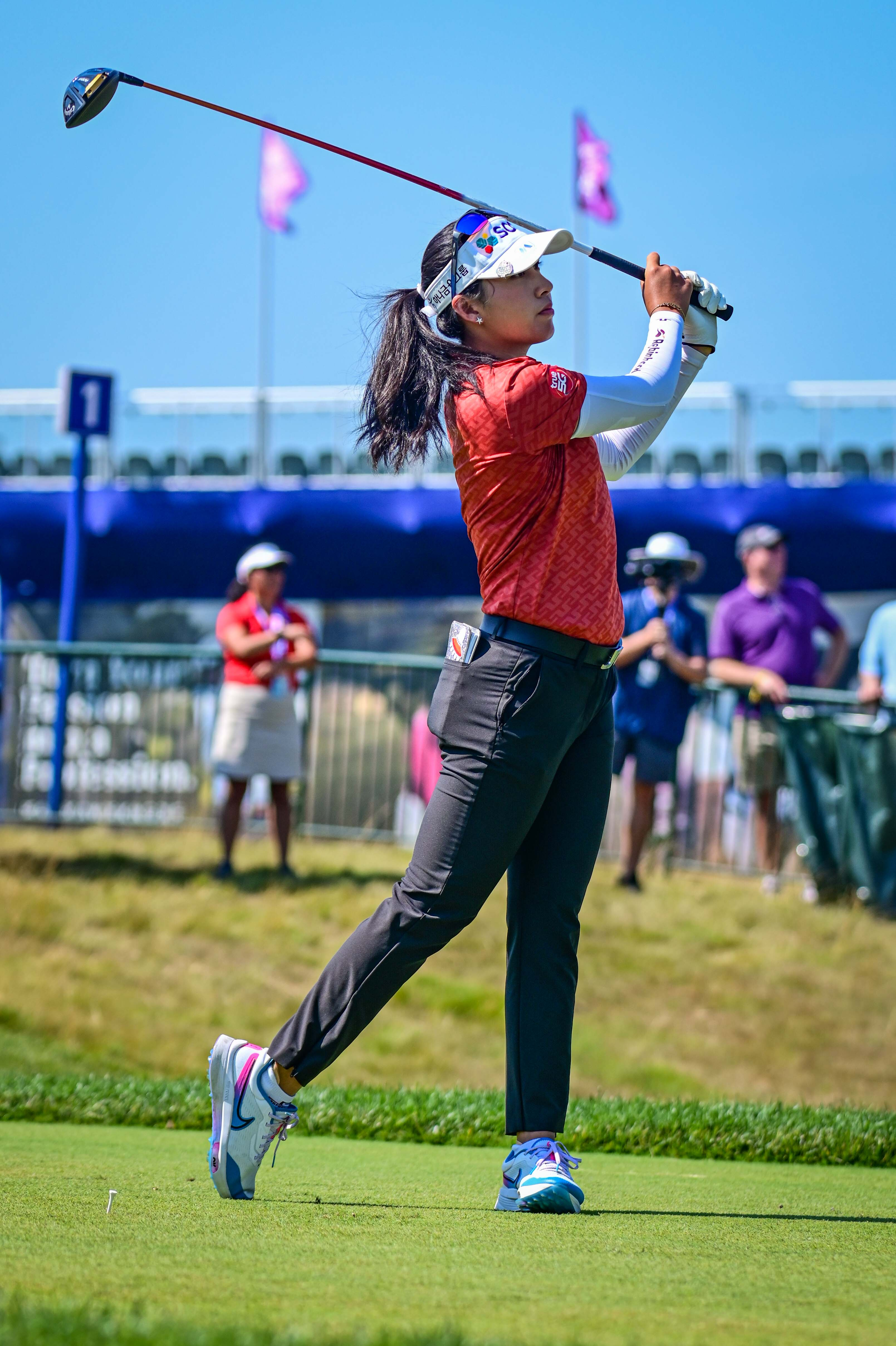
Thitikul at the 2022 KPMG Women's PGA Championship

In her rookie season on the LPGA Tour, Thitikul won her first LPGA Tour title at the JTBC Classic on 27 March, in her fifth start as a Tour member. She closed with an 8-under-par 64 to overcome a six-stroke deficit after 54 holes and defeated Nanna Koerstz Madsen on the second playoff hole.

In September, Thitikul won her second LPGA Tour title at the Walmart NW Arkansas Championship, defeating Danielle Kang with a birdie on the second playoff hole.

On 31 October, Thitikul reached world No. 1 for the first time. At age 19, she became the second-youngest player to attain the top ranking, after Lydia Ko, and the second Thai player to do so, after Ariya Jutanugarn. On 10 November, she was named the LPGA Tour Rookie of the Year, becoming the third Thai player to win the award.

=== 2023 ===
In May, Thitikul was part of the Thai team that won the 2023 International Crown, Thailand's first title in the competition. She defeated Stephanie Kyriacou 4 and 2 in her singles match as Thailand swept Australia in the final.

Although she did not win an individual LPGA Tour event during the season, Thitikul recorded a tour-leading 13 top-10 finishes. In October, she finished runner-up to Céline Boutier at the Maybank Championship after a nine-hole playoff, which tied for the second-longest sudden-death playoff in LPGA Tour history.

Thitikul concluded the LPGA Tour season by winning her first Vare Trophy with a scoring average of 69.533 over 75 rounds. She became the second Thai player to win the award, after Ariya Jutanugarn in 2018, and the first player in the award's 70-year history to do so without winning a tournament that season.

In December, Thitikul won the individual title at the Simone Asia Pacific Cup on the Ladies Asian Tour by seven strokes and partnered with Jaravee Boonchant to win the team competition for Thailand.

=== 2024 ===
In June, Thitikul teamed with Ruoning Yin to win the Dow Championship, a two-player team stroke-play event.

Following her victory at the Dow Championship, Thitikul began competing under her nickname "Jeeno" instead of her given name Atthaya. She said that she considered "Jeeno" more distinctive and easier for people to remember.

In November, Thitikul won the season-long Aon Risk Reward Challenge, earning a $1 million prize. Later that month, she won the season-ending CME Group Tour Championship, closing with a 7-under-par 65 to finish at 22 under and defeat Angel Yin by one stroke. Thitikul overturned a two-stroke deficit over the final two holes with an eagle on the par-5 17th and a birdie on the 18th, earning the $4 million winner's prize.

=== 2025 ===
Thitikul opened her 2025 season by winning the PIF Saudi Ladies International on the Ladies European Tour in February. In May, she won the Mizuho Americas Open for her fifth LPGA Tour title.

In July, Thitikul finished runner-up at The Amundi Evian Championship, her best result in a major championship. She lost to Grace Kim on the second hole of a sudden-death playoff. On 4 August, she returned to No. 1 in the Women's World Golf Rankings for the second time in her career, having first held the position in 2022.

In October, Thitikul won the Buick LPGA Shanghai, defeating Minami Katsu in a five-hole playoff.

Thitikul concluded the season by defending her CME Group Tour Championship title, finishing at 26 under par to defeat Pajaree Anannarukarn by four strokes. The victory was her third LPGA Tour title of the season and seventh of her career. She also won the Race to the CME Globe, her first Player of the Year award, her second Vare Trophy, and the LPGA money title. Her scoring average of 68.681 set an LPGA Tour single-season record, surpassing the previous mark of 68.697 set by Annika Sörenstam in 2002.

=== 2026 ===
On 22 February, Thitikul secured her eighth LPGA Tour title by winning the Honda LPGA Thailand at the Siam Country Club in Pattaya, marking her first LPGA victory in her home country. Competing as the World No. 1, she finished the tournament with a 24-under-par 264, defeating Japan's Chizzy Iwai by one stroke. This victory made Thitikul the third Thai golfer to win the event, following Ariya Jutanugarn and Patty Tavatanakit.

In May, Thitikul successfully defended her title at the Mizuho Americas Open. She shot a final-round 69 to finish at 13-under-par 275 at Mountain Ridge Country Club in New Jersey, defeating China's Yin Ruoning by four strokes.

In August, Thitikul won the Standard Portland Classic for her third LPGA Tour title of the season and tenth of her career. She shot a final-round 64 to finish at 22-under-par 266, one stroke ahead of fellow Thai players Chanettee Wannasaen and Arpichaya Yubol.

Thitikul won the Lotte Championship by three shots in October for her fourth win of the season. The victory took her career earnings past $20 million and moved her into fifth place on the LPGA Tour's all-time money list.

== Records and achievements ==
- On 9 July 2017, Thitikul became the youngest person to win a professional golf tournament, winning the Ladies European Thailand Championship at age 14 years, 4 months and 19 days. She held the record until April 2023, when Louise Uma Landgraf won the Terre Blanche Ladies Open at age 14 years, 2 months and 18 days.
- In November 2021, Thitikul became the youngest winner of the Ladies European Tour's Race to Costa del Sol, finishing the season at age 18 years, 9 months and 8 days.
- On 31 October 2022, Thitikul became the second-youngest player to reach No. 1 in the Women's World Golf Rankings, after Lydia Ko.
- In 2025, Thitikul set an LPGA Tour single-season scoring record with an average of 68.681, surpassing the previous mark of 68.697 set by Annika Sörenstam in 2002.
- In 2025, Thitikul also set the LPGA Tour record for official earnings in a single season, with $7,578,330, breaking her own record from the previous season.
- On 10 May 2026, Thitikul became the fastest player in LPGA Tour history to reach $18 million in official career earnings. She also held the records for the fastest to reach each earnings milestone from $8 million through $18 million.

== Personal life ==
=== Friendship with Yin Ruoning ===
Thitikul is good friends with fellow LPGA Tour player Yin Ruoning, with their friendship beginning in November 2023 according to Yin. The pair went on to win the 2024 Dow Championship as a team. After the tournament, Thitikul described Yin as "just what I wanted [her] to be" in a partner and "like my best friend out there", and credited Yin with allowing her to feel comfortable while playing.

== Amateur wins ==
- 2016 Singapore Junior Golf Championship qualifier, TGA-Singha Junior Ranking #6, TGA-Singha Junior Ranking #1, TGA-Singha Junior Ranking #3, TGA-Singha Junior Ranking #4, Singha Thailand Junior World Golf Championship qualifier, Singha Thailand Junior World Championships
- 2017 Taiwan Amateur Championship, Dutch International Junior Open, SEA Games (women's individual), Santi Cup, Pondok Indah International Junior Championship
- 2018 National Team Ranking #2, Women's Amateur Asia-Pacific, National Team Ranking #4, Queen Sirikit Cup, National Team Ranking #5, World Junior Girls Championship
- 2019 National Team Ranking #4, Thailand Ladies Amateur Open, National Team Ranking #5, World Junior Girls Championship

== Professional wins (25) ==
=== LPGA Tour wins (12) ===
Legend
Major championships (0)
Other LPGA Tour (11)

#	Date	Tournament	Winning score	To par	Margin of victory	Runner(s)-up	Winner's share ($)	Ref.
1	27 Mar 2022	JTBC Classic	69-70-69-64=272	−16	Playoff	(Denmark) Nanna Koerstz Madsen	225,000	
2	25 Sep 2022	Walmart NW Arkansas Championship	67-61-68=196	−17	Playoff	(United States) Danielle Kang	345,000	
3	30 Jun 2024	Dow Championship (with (China) Yin Ruoning)	64-66-66-62=258	−22	1 stroke	(United States) Ally Ewing and (United States) Jennifer Kupcho	366,082 (each)	
4	24 Nov 2024	CME Group Tour Championship	71-67-63-65=266	−22	1 stroke	(United States) Angel Yin	4,000,000	
5	11 May 2025	Mizuho Americas Open	64-73-65-69=271	−17	4 strokes	(France) Céline Boutier	450,000	
6	12 Oct 2025	Buick LPGA Shanghai	65-70-66-63=264	−24	Playoff	(Japan) Minami Katsu	330,000	
7	23 Nov 2025	CME Group Tour Championship (2)	67-63-64-68=262	−26	4 strokes	(Thailand) Pajaree Anannarukarn	4,000,000	
8	22 Feb 2026	Honda LPGA Thailand	67-63-66-68=264	−24	1 stroke	(Japan) Chizzy Iwai	270,000	
9	10 May 2026	Mizuho Americas Open (2)	67-69-70-69=275	−13	4 strokes	(China) Yin Ruoning	487,500	
10	16 Aug 2026	Standard Portland Classic	68-67-67-64=266	−22	1 stroke	(Thailand) Chanettee Wannasaen (Thailand) Arpichaya Yubol	300,000	
11	4 Oct 2026	Lotte Championship	67-65-67-68=267	−21	3 strokes	(South Korea) Ina Yoon	450,000	
12	22 Nov 2026	CME Group Tour Championship (3)	65-67-67-65=264	−24	2 strokes	(Japan) Akie Iwai	4,000,000	

LPGA Tour playoff record (3–2)

#	Year	Tournament	Opponent	Result	Ref.
1	2022	JTBC Classic	(Denmark) Nanna Koerstz Madsen	Won with bogey on second extra hole	
2	2022	Walmart NW Arkansas Championship	(United States) Danielle Kang	Won with birdie on second extra hole	
3	2023	Maybank Championship	(France) Céline Boutier	Lost to birdie on ninth extra hole	
4	2025	Amundi Evian Championship	(Australia) Grace Kim	Lost to eagle on second extra hole	
5	2025	Buick LPGA Shanghai	(Japan) Minami Katsu	Won with birdie on fifth extra hole	

=== Ladies European Tour wins (5) ===
#	Date	Tournament	Winning score	To par	Margin of victory	Runner-up	Winner's share (€)	Ref.
1	9 Jul 2017	Ladies European Thailand Championship (Note: Thitikul won as an amateur)	70-71-70-72=283	−5	2 strokes	(Mexico) Ana Menendez	–	
2	23 Jul 2019	Ladies European Thailand Championship (2)	69-67-63-67=266	−22	5 strokes	(Germany) Esther Henseleit	–	
3	27 Jun 2021	Tipsport Czech Ladies Open	68-68-65=201	−15	1 stroke	(Spain) Nuria Iturrioz	30,000	
4	11 Sep 2021	VP Bank Swiss Ladies Open	68-66-66=200	−16	1 stroke	(Norway) Marianne Skarpnord	30,000	
5	15 Feb 2025	PIF Saudi Ladies International	67-64-69=200	−16	4 strokes	(South Korea) Lee So-mi	675,000	

Ladies European Tour playoff record (0–2)

#	Year	Tournament	Opponent	Result	Ref.
1	2021	Aramco Team Series – London	(Norway) Marianne Skarpnord	Lost to birdie on second extra hole	
2	2025	Amundi Evian Championship	(Australia) Grace Kim	Lost to eagle on second extra hole	

=== Ladies Asian Tour wins (1) ===
#	Date	Tournament	Winning score	To par	Margin of victory	Runner-up	Winner's share ($)	Ref.
1	23 Dec 2023	Simone Asia Pacific Cup	68-65-69=202	−14	7 strokes	(South Korea) Lee Da-yeon	110,000	

=== Thai LPGA Tour wins (7) ===
#	Date	Tournament	Winning score	To par	Margin of victory	Runner(s)-up	Winner's share (฿)	Ref.
1	9 Jul 2017	Ladies European Thailand Championship	70-71-70-72=283	−5	2 strokes	(Mexico) Ana Menendez	–	
2	23 Jul 2019	Ladies European Thailand Championship (2)	69-67-63-67=266	−22	5 strokes	(Germany) Esther Henseleit	–	
3	24 Jul 2020	3rd Singha-SAT Thai LPGA Championship	66-66-67=199	−17	2 strokes	(Thailand) Dolnapa Phudthipinij	120,000	
4	19 Sep 2020	6th Singha-SAT Thai LPGA Championship	66-72-69=207	−9	1 stroke	(Thailand) Supamas Sangchan	120,000	
5	10 Oct 2020	7th Singha-SAT Thai LPGA Championship	67-70-68=205	−11	3 strokes	(Thailand) Chonlada Chayanun (Thailand) Prima Thammaraks	120,000	
6	31 Oct 2020	8th Singha-SAT Thai LPGA Championship	67-67-67=201	−15	4 strokes	(Thailand) Kultida Pramphun	120,000	
7	20 Nov 2020	Muang Thai Insurance Thailand LPGA Masters	66-68-66=200	−16	5 strokes	(Thailand) Pimkwan Chookaew (a)	600,000	

=== Other wins (2) ===
- 2021 Phoenix Ladies Classic
- 2023 Simone Asia Pacific Cup - team (with Jaravee Boonchant)

== Results in LPGA majors ==
Results not in chronological order.

Tournament	2017	2018	2019	2020	2021	2022	2023	2024	2025	2026
Chevron Championship		T30LA				T17	T4	12	T24	CUT
U.S. Women's Open						T24	CUT	T6	CUT	T28
Women's PGA Championship						4	CUT	T52	T4	T8
The Evian Championship	T64			NT	5	T8	T9	CUT	2	T10
Women's British Open	CUT	T64LA	T29LA		T48	T7	T36	T17	T30	T4

Top 10
Did not play

LA = low amateur
CUT = missed the half-way cut
NT = no tournament
T = tied

=== Summary ===
Tournament	Wins	2nd	3rd	Top-5	Top-10	Top-25	Events	Cuts made
Chevron Championship	0	0	0	1	1	4	6	5
U.S. Women's Open	0	0	0	0	1	2	5	3
Women's PGA Championship	0	0	0	2	3	3	5	4
The Evian Championship	0	1	0	2	5	5	7	6
Women's British Open	0	0	0	1	2	3	9	8
Totals	0	1	0	6	12	17	32	26

- Most consecutive cuts made – 12 (2017 Evian – 2023 Chevron)
- Longest streak of top-10s – 4 (2022 Women's PGA – 2023 Chevron)

== Ladies European Tour career summary ==
Year	Tournaments played	Cuts made	Wins	2nd	3rd	Top 10s	Best finish	Earnings (€)	Money list rank	Scoring average	Scoring rank
2017	3	2	1	0	0	1	1	–	n/a	71.78	n/a (Note: Insufficient rounds played to rank)
2018	1	1	0	0	0	0	T64	–	n/a	75.00	n/a
2019	2	2	1	0	0	1	1	–	n/a	68.75	n/a
2020	1	1	0	0	0	1	T4	8,505	95	69.50	n/a
2021	17	17	2	2	2	14	1	602,042	2	69.58	2
2025	3	3	1	1	0	2	1	1,383,554	1	69.00	n/a
Totals (Note: Official as of 2021 season)	25	24	5	2	2	17	1	1,252,042	2		

== LPGA Tour career summary ==
Year	Tournaments played	Cuts made*	Wins	2nd	3rd	Top 10s	Best finish	Earnings ($)	Money list rank	Scoring average	Scoring rank
2017 (Note: Competed as an amateur; events excluded from totals)	3	2	0	0	0	0	T37	–	n/a	72.00	n/a
2018	4	4	0	0	0	1	T8	–	n/a	71.88	n/a
2019	2	2	0	0	0	0	T29	–	n/a	71.50	n/a
2021	5	5	0	2	0	4	2	n/a	n/a	68.95	n/a
2022	26	25	2	0	0	16	1	2,193,642	5	69.46	3
2023	21	18	0	2	1	13	2	1,538,119	17	69.53	1
2024	17	15	2	2	0	12	1	6,059,309	1	69.33	1
2025	20	19	3	4	1	14	1	7,578,330	1	68.68	1
2026	17	15	4			10	1	2,840,611	3	69.71	4
Totals^	100	92	11	10	2	65	1	20,210,011	5		

^ Official as of 4 October 2026
* Includes match play and other tournaments without a cut

== World ranking ==
Position in Women's World Golf Rankings at the end of each calendar year.

Year	World ranking	Source
2017	352	
2018	245	
2019	229	
2020	275	
2021	19	
2022	3	
2023	9	
2024	4	
2025	1	
2026	2^	

^ As of 5 October 2026

== Team appearances ==
Amateur

- Patsy Hankins Trophy (representing Asia/Pacific): 2018 (winners)
- SEA Games (representing Thailand): 2017 (winners), 2019
- Youth Olympic Games (representing Thailand): 2018 (winners)
- World Junior Girls Championship (representing Thailand): 2018, 2019
- Asian Games (representing Thailand): 2018
- Amata Friendship Cup (representing Thailand): 2018 (winners)
- Queen Sirikit Cup (representing Thailand): 2016, 2017, 2018

Professional

- International Crown (representing Thailand): 2023 (winners), 2025
