= Thailand LPGA Masters =

Golf tournament in Thailand

Tournament information
- Location: Khon Kaen, Thailand
- Established: 2013
- Course: Singha Park Khon Kaen GC
- Par: 72
- Tours: Thai LPGA Tour; Taiwan LPGA Tour (2022–2023); ALPG Tour (2016–2019); China LPGA Tour (2017–2019)
- Format: Stroke play (54 holes)
- Prize fund: ฿4 million
- Month played: September

Tournament record score
- Aggregate: 198 Patcharajutar Kongkraphan (2022)
- To par: −18 as above

Current champion
- (Thailand) Budsabakorn Sukapan

The Thailand LPGA Masters is a women's professional golf tournament held in Thailand. It was first played on the Thai LPGA Tour in 2013. In 2016, the tournament was co-sanctioned by the ALPG Tour. From 2017 to 2019, it was co-sanctioned by both the China LPGA Tour and the ALPG Tour, and from 2022 to 2023 it was also co-sanctioned by the Taiwan LPGA Tour.

== Tournament names ==
- 2013–2014: Thailand LPGA Masters
- 2015, 2017–2018: PTT Thailand LPGA Masters
- 2016: Idemitsu-SAT Thailand LPGA Masters
- 2019: Trust Golf Thailand LPGA Masters
- 2020: Muang Thai Insurance Thailand LPGA Masters
- 2021–2023: BGC Thailand LPGA Masters
- 2024–present: Singha-SAT Thai LPGA Masters

== Winners ==
| Internationally co-sanctioned event |
| Thai LPGA Tour event |

| # | Year | Tour(s) (Note: THAI − Thai LPGA Tour; TLPGA − Taiwan LPGA Tour; CLPGA − China LPGA Tour; ALPG − ALPG Tour.) | Winner | Score | To par | Margin of victory | Runner(s)-up | Purse (฿) | Venue | Ref. |
Singha-SAT Thai LPGA Masters
| 14th | 2026 | THAI | (Thailand) Budsabakorn Sukapan | 209 | −7 | 1 stroke | (Thailand) Sherman Santiwiwatthanaphong | 4,000,000 | Singha Park Khon Kaen GC | |
| 13th | 2025 | THAI | (Philippines) Florence Yvon Bisera | 211 | −5 | 1 stroke | (Thailand) Nattarika Sensai | 4,000,000 | Singha Park Khon Kaen GC | |
| 12th | 2024 | THAI | (Thailand) Patcharajutar Kongkraphan (2) | 204 | −12 | 5 strokes | (Thailand) Kamonwan Lueamsri | 4,000,000 | Royal Hua Hin GC | |
BGC Thailand LPGA Masters
| 11th | 2023 | THAI, TLPGA | (Thailand) Wassawan Sangkapong | 205 | −11 | 1 stroke | (Thailand) Thanita Muangkhumsakul | 4,000,000 | Black Mountain GC | |
| 10th | 2022 | THAI, TLPGA | (Thailand) Patcharajutar Kongkraphan | 198 | −18 | 1 stroke | (Thailand) Chonlada Chayanun | 4,000,000 | Black Mountain GC | |
| 9th | 2021 | THAI | (Thailand) Jaravee Boonchant | 204 | −12 | 1 stroke | (Thailand) Chanettee Wannasaen | 4,000,000 | Panya Indra GC | |
Muang Thai Insurance Thailand LPGA Masters
| 8th | 2020 | THAI | (Thailand) Atthaya Thitikul | 200 | −16 | 5 strokes | (Thailand) Pimkwan Chookaew (a) | 4,000,000 | Watermill GC | |
Trust Golf Thailand LPGA Masters
| 7th | 2019 | THAI, CLPGA, ALPG | (China) Zhang Weiwei | 204 | −12 | 2 strokes | (Thailand) Patcharajutar Kongkraphan | 4,000,000 | Panya Indra GC | |
PTT Thailand LPGA Masters
| 6th | 2018 | THAI, CLPGA, ALPG | (Thailand) Parinda Phokan | 202 | −14 | 6 strokes | (Thailand) Kultida Pramphun (a) | 4,000,000 | Panya Indra GC | |
| 5th | 2017 | THAI, CLPGA, ALPG | (Thailand) Saranporn Langkulgasettrin | 211 | −5 | 1 stroke | (Thailand) Budsabakorn Sukapan (Thailand) Parinda Phokan (Thailand) Ploychompoo Wilairungrueng | 4,000,000 | Panya Indra GC | |
Idemitsu-SAT Thailand LPGA Masters
| 4th | 2016 | THAI, ALPG | (Thailand) Pannarat Thanapolboonyaras | 204 | −12 | 3 strokes | (Thailand) Benyapa Niphatsophon | 4,000,000 | Panya Indra GC | |
PTT Thailand LPGA Masters
| 3rd | 2015 | THAI | (Thailand) Pornanong Phatlum (3) | 207 | −9 | 2 strokes | (Thailand) Budsabakorn Sukapan | 3,000,000 | Panya Indra GC | |
Thailand LPGA Masters
| 2nd | 2014 | THAI | (Thailand) Pornanong Phatlum (2) | 207 | −9 | 4 strokes | (Thailand) Rungthiwa Pangjan (Thailand) Nontaya Srisawang | 3,000,000 | Panya Indra GC | |
| 1st | 2013 | THAI | (Thailand) Pornanong Phatlum | 207 | −9 | 1 stroke | (Thailand) Thidapa Suwannapura | 1,500,000 | Panya Indra GC | |
