= Cholcheva Wongras =

Thai professional golfer (born 2007)

Personal information
- Nickname: Arpo
- Nationality: Thailand
- Born: 20 March 2007 (age 19) Chiang Mai, Thailand

Career
- Sport: Golf
- Turned professional: 2022
- Current tours: Thai LPGA Tour; WPGA Tour of Australasia; Epson Tour
- Professional wins: 5

Number of wins by tour
- Epson Tour: 1
- Other: 4

Achievements and awards
- Thai LPGA Tour Order of Merit: 2024, 2025
- WPGA Tour of Australasia Order of Merit: 2025

Cholcheva Wongras (Thai: ชลชีวา วงษรัศม์; born 20 March 2007), nicknamed Arpo, is a Thai professional golfer. She has won on the Thai LPGA Tour, the Taiwan LPGA Tour, and the Epson Tour, and has competed on the WPGA Tour of Australasia.

Her career achievements include winning the Thai LPGA Tour Order of Merit in 2024 and 2025, the WPGA Tour of Australasia Order of Merit in 2025, and her first Epson Tour title at the 2026 Reliance Matrix Championship, where she set an Epson Tour 72-hole scoring record.

== Professional career ==
Wongras turned professional in 2022. In May 2024, she won her first professional title at the Singha-SAT Bangkok Ladies Championship on the Thai LPGA Tour, finishing at 18-under-par 198, three strokes ahead of Chonlada Chayanun. She added a second Thai LPGA Tour title in July 2024 at the Singha-NSDF Pattaya Ladies Championship, defeating Sherman Santiwiwatthanaphong in a sudden-death playoff. She won the Thai LPGA Tour Order of Merit in 2024.

In March 2025, Wongras finished third at the Australian Women's Classic on the Ladies European Tour. Later that month, she finished runner-up at the World Sand Greens Championship on the WPGA Tour of Australasia for the second consecutive year. In April, she won the Singha-NSDF Pattaya Ladies Open on the Thai LPGA Tour after a final-round 62, finishing at 14-under-par 202.

Later in 2025, Wongras won her first Taiwan LPGA Tour title at the Kenda Tires TLPGA Open, finishing at 15-under-par 201. She also made an LPGA Tour appearance at the 2025 Maybank Championship after qualifying through the ASEAN Qualifier. She won the WPGA Tour of Australasia Order of Merit for the 2025 season and the Thai LPGA Tour Order of Merit for the second consecutive year.

Wongras joined the Epson Tour in 2026. In May, she won the Reliance Matrix Championship for her first Epson Tour title, finishing at 26-under-par 262 and setting an Epson Tour 72-hole scoring record. Her second-round 61 tied the tour's 18-hole scoring record, and her 36-hole total of 18-under-par tied the tour's 36-hole scoring record. She recorded five top-10 finishes during her rookie season and finished sixth in the Race for the Card standings, earning LPGA Tour membership for the 2027 season.

== Professional wins (5) ==
=== Epson Tour wins (1) ===
#	Date	Tournament	Winning score	To par	Margin of victory	Runner-up	Winner's share ($)	Ref.
1	10 May 2026	Reliance Matrix Championship	65-61-69-67=262	−26	5 strokes	(China) Zeng Liqi	37,500	

=== Thai LPGA Tour wins (3) ===
#	Date	Tournament	Winning score	To par	Margin of victory	Runner-up	Winner's share (฿)	Ref.
1	31 May 2024	Singha-SAT Bangkok Ladies Championship	64-63-71=198	−18	3 strokes	(Thailand) Chonlada Chayanun	156,000	
2	19 Jul 2024	Singha-NSDF Pattaya Ladies Championship	71-70-67=208	−8	Playoff	(Thailand) Sherman Santiwiwatthanaphong	156,000	
3	25 Apr 2025	Singha-NSDF Pattaya Ladies Open	69-71-62=202	−14	2 strokes	(Thailand) Nemittra Juntanaket	260,000	

=== Taiwan LPGA Tour wins (1) ===
#	Date	Tournament	Winning score	To par	Margin of victory	Runners-up	Winner's share (NT$)	Ref.
1	26 Sep 2025	Kenda Tires TLPGA Open	66-66-69=201	−15	5 strokes	(Taiwan) Ching Huang, (Taiwan) Min Lee (Thailand) Patcharajutar Kongkraphan, (Taiwan) Yu-Ju Chen	720,000	
