= Pornanong Phatlum =

Thai professional golfer (born 1989)

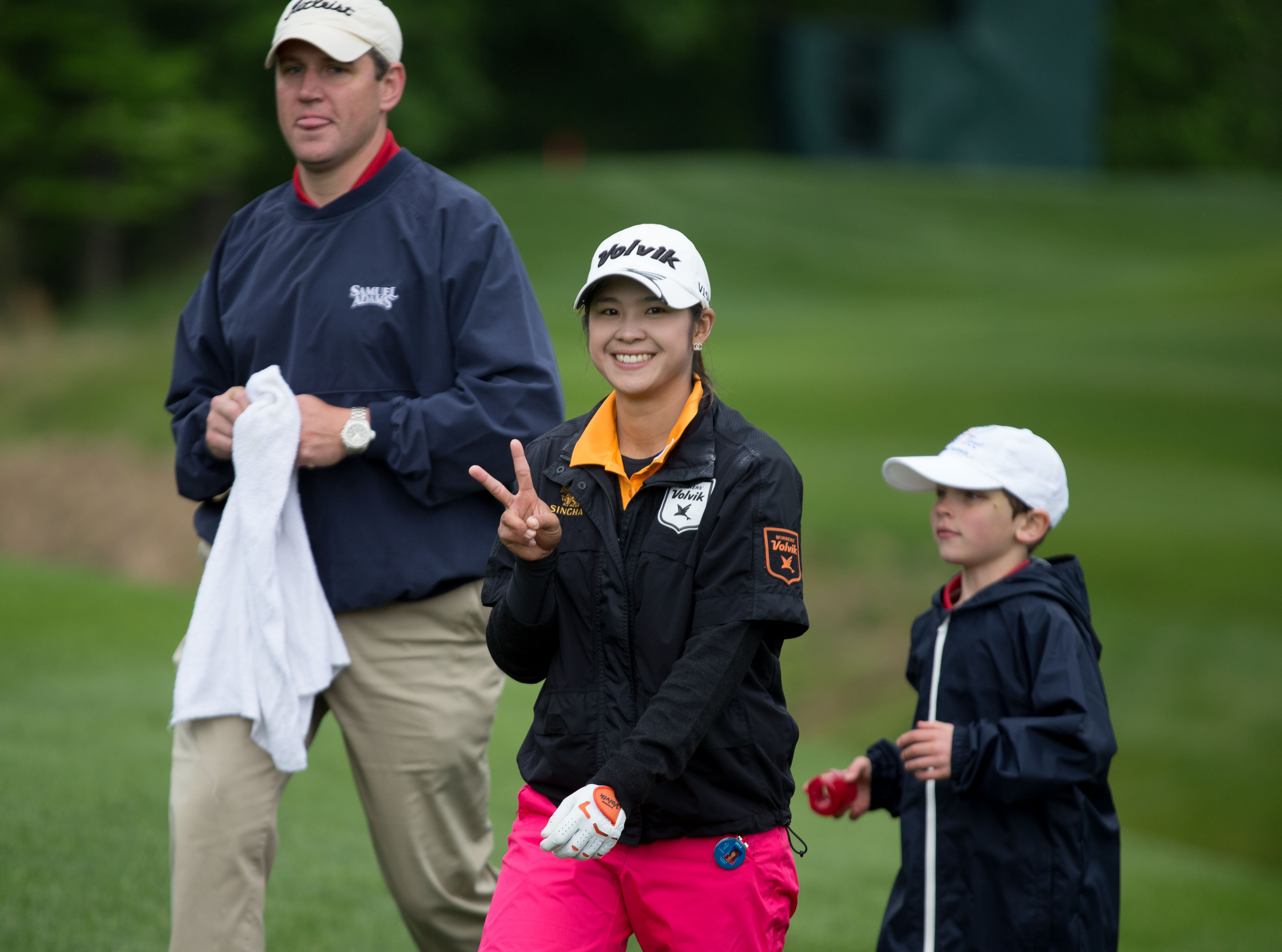
- Phatlum in 2013

Personal information
- Nickname: Waen (แหวน)
- Nationality: Thailand
- Born: 4 December 1989 (age 36) Khon Kaen, Thailand
- Height: 5 ft 3 in (1.60 m)

Career
- Sport: Golf
- College: Chaiyaphum Rajabhat University
- Turned professional: 2006
- Current tour: LPGA Tour (joined 2009)
- Former tour: Ladies Asian Golf Tour
- Professional wins: 23

Number of wins by tour
- Ladies European Tour: 3
- Ladies Asian Golf Tour: 9
- Epson Tour: 1
- Other: 11

Best results in LPGA major championships
- Chevron Championship: T13: 2013
- Women's PGA C'ship: T14: 2019
- U.S. Women's Open: T7: 2014
- Women's British Open: 2nd: 2018
- Evian Championship: T20: 2015

Pornanong Phatlum (Thai: พรอนงค์ เพชรล้ำ; born 4 December 1989) is a Thai professional golfer who has competed on the LPGA Tour and Ladies European Tour (LET). She has won three LET titles and is a four-time winner of the Hero Women's Indian Open (2008, 2009, 2012 and 2026). Her best finish in a major championship was runner-up at the 2018 Women's British Open, where she held the lead after 54 holes.

Phatlum won the 2006 Hong Kong Ladies Masters as an amateur before turning professional later that year. She began her professional career on the Ladies Asian Golf Tour and joined the LPGA Tour in 2009. In 2024, she won her first Epson Tour title and regained LPGA Tour membership for the following season. She has also represented Thailand at the 2016 Summer Olympics and in three editions of the International Crown.

== Early life and amateur career ==
Phatlum was born in Khon Kaen, Thailand, and attended Chaiyaphum Rajabhat University. She began playing golf at the age of nine and has credited her father as the person who most influenced her golfing career.

As an amateur, Phatlum competed on the Ladies Asian Golf Tour, finishing tied for 16th at the 2005 Phuket Ladies Masters. She also represented Thailand at the Queen Sirikit Cup in 2005.

In February 2006, she won the Hong Kong Ladies Masters, a professional tournament, while still an amateur. She recorded rounds of 70, 73 and 73 for a three-under-par total of 216, finishing one stroke ahead of Russamee Gulyanamitta and Zhong Xiaolong.

== Professional career ==
=== Early professional career (2006–2011) ===
Phatlum turned professional in February 2006, shortly after winning the Hong Kong Ladies Masters. She initially competed primarily on the Ladies Asian Golf Tour, where she recorded several victories during the early years of her career.

In February 2008, she won the Thailand Ladies Open at The Vintage Club, recording a total of 208, eight-under-par, to finish two strokes ahead of Frances Bondad and Kim Hae-jung. The following month, she claimed the DLF Women's Indian Open, finishing at four-under-par 212, four strokes ahead of the runners-up. Later that year, Phatlum tied for 34th at the LPGA Final Qualifying Tournament, earning playing status on the LPGA Tour for the 2009 season.

Phatlum began competing on the LPGA Tour in 2009. During the same year, she successfully defended her title at the DLF Women's Indian Open, winning by two strokes over Kim Hae-jung. She also competed on the Futures Tour in 2009 and 2010, finishing 10th on the 2010 money list with six top-10 finishes.

In January 2011, Phatlum won the Hitachi Ladies Classic in Taiwan with a five-under-par total of 211, eight strokes ahead of Miki Saiki. On the LPGA Tour, her best results that season included tied-13th finishes at the Honda LPGA Thailand and the RR Donnelley LPGA Founders Cup.

=== International success (2012–2017) ===
In December 2012, Phatlum claimed her first Ladies European Tour title at the Hero Women's Indian Open, an event co-sanctioned by the LET and the Ladies Asian Golf Tour. She finished at 13-under-par 203, four strokes ahead of Caroline Hedwall, to secure her third victory in the tournament after her previous wins in 2008 and 2009. Earlier that year, she also won the HSBC Brazil Cup, an unofficial LPGA Tour event, defeating Amy Hung by four strokes.

In 2013, Phatlum recorded several strong performances on the LPGA Tour, including a runner-up finish at the Mobile Bay LPGA Classic, where she shot a final-round 63. In December, she won her second Ladies European Tour title at the Omega Dubai Ladies Masters. A closing round of 66 gave her a 15-under-par total of 273, one stroke ahead of world number three Stacy Lewis.

Phatlum also continued to compete on regional tours. She won the Hitachi Ladies Classic in Taiwan in three consecutive years from 2013 to 2015, bringing her total number of victories at the event to four. On the Thai LPGA Tour, she won five titles between 2012 and 2016, including three consecutive Thailand LPGA Masters titles from 2013 to 2015 and the Bangchak Thai LPGA Open in 2016.

On the LPGA Tour, Phatlum recorded seven top-10 finishes during the 2014 season. In March 2016, she finished runner-up at the HSBC Women's Champions in Singapore, shooting a final-round 68 for a 15-under-par total of 273, four strokes behind Jang Ha-na. She finished the 2016 LPGA Tour season with five top-10 finishes.

Phatlum represented Thailand in the women's individual golf competition at the 2016 Summer Olympics in Rio de Janeiro, finishing tied for 25th. She also represented her country at the International Crown in 2014, 2016, and 2018.

=== 2018 Women's British Open ===
Phatlum achieved her best result in a major championship at the 2018 Women's British Open, held at Royal Lytham & St Annes Golf Club in England. After opening with consecutive rounds of 67, she held the outright lead at the halfway stage. A third-round 69 left her at 13-under-par 203, one stroke ahead of England's Georgia Hall entering the final round.

Phatlum and Hall were closely matched during the final round, but Hall took the lead with a birdie at the 16th hole. Phatlum then made a double bogey at the 17th, allowing Hall to extend her advantage. Phatlum closed with a two-under-par 70 to finish second at 15-under-par 273, two strokes behind Hall, who claimed her first major title. It remains Phatlum's best finish in a major championship.

=== Later career (2019–2026) ===
Phatlum continued to compete on the LPGA Tour in the following seasons. Her results included a fourth-place finish at the 2022 Walmart NW Arkansas Championship and a tied-10th finish at the same event in 2023.

In 2024, Phatlum returned to the Epson Tour, recording four top-10 finishes in ten starts. In August, she won the Wildhorse Ladies Golf Classic in Pendleton, Oregon, for her first Epson Tour title. She recorded rounds of 65, 66 and 64 to finish at 21-under-par 195, two strokes ahead of Amy Lee, and broke the tournament's 54-hole scoring record. She finished 12th in the Epson Tour's Race for the Card standings, earning LPGA Tour membership for the 2025 season.

During the 2025 LPGA Tour season, Phatlum competed in 15 events and recorded a season-best tied-10th finish at the Lotte Championship.

In October 2026, Phatlum won the Hero Women's Indian Open for the fourth time, following victories in 2008, 2009 and 2012. She shot a final-round 65 to finish at 11-under-par 277, four strokes ahead of Vani Kapoor. The victory marked her third Ladies European Tour title and her first since 2013.

== Professional wins (23) ==
=== Ladies European Tour wins (3) ===
No.	Date	Tournament	Winning score	To par	Margin of victory	Runner-up	Ref.
1	2 Dec 2012	Hero Women's Indian Open^{1}	72-65-66=203	−13	4 strokes	(Sweden) Caroline Hedwall	
2	7 Dec 2013	Omega Dubai Ladies Masters	68-70-69-66=273	−15	1 stroke	(United States) Stacy Lewis	
3	25 Oct 2026	Hero Women's Indian Open (2)	72-71-69-65=277	−11	4 strokes	(India) Vani Kapoor	

^{1} Co-sanctioned by the Ladies Asian Golf Tour.

=== Ladies Asian Golf Tour wins (9) ===
No.	Date	Tournament	Winning score	To par	Margin of victory	Runner-up	Ref.
1	10 Feb 2006	Hong Kong Ladies Masters (as an amateur)	70-73-73=216	−3	1 stroke	(Thailand) Russamee Gulyanamitta, (China) Zhong Xiaolong	
2	22 Feb 2008	Thailand Ladies Open	65-73-70=208	−8	2 strokes	(Australia) Frances Bondad, (South Korea) Kim Hae-jung	
3	26 Mar 2008	DLF Women's Indian Open	70-70-72=212	−4	4 strokes	(Taiwan) Wei Yun-jye, (Japan) Yuki Sakurai	
4	27 Feb 2009	DLF Women's Indian Open (2)	68-72-68=208	−8	2 strokes	(South Korea) Kim Hae-jung	
5	23 Jan 2011	Hitachi Ladies Classic	69-72-70=211	−5	8 strokes	(Japan) Miki Saiki	
6	2 Dec 2012	Hero Women's Indian Open^{1} (3)	72-65-66=203	−13	4 strokes	(Sweden) Caroline Hedwall	
7	20 Jan 2013	Hitachi Ladies Classic (2)	67-72-71=210	−6	2 strokes	(Thailand) Patcharajutar Kongkraphan	
8	12 Jan 2014	Hitachi Ladies Classic (3)	70-69-69=208	−8	5 strokes	(Taiwan) Pei-Yun Chien	
9	11 Jan 2015	Hitachi Ladies Classic (4)	71-71-72=214	−2	3 strokes	(Taiwan) Chen Meng-chu, (Taiwan) Teresa Lu	

^{1} Co-sanctioned by the Ladies European Tour.

=== Epson Tour wins (1) ===
No.	Date	Tournament	Winning score	To par	Margin of victory	Runner-up	Ref.
1	18 Aug 2024	Wildhorse Ladies Golf Classic	65-66-64=195	−21	2 strokes	(United States) Amy Lee	

=== All Thailand Golf Tour wins (5) ===
- 2006 Singha Pattaya Open, Singha E-San Open
- 2011 Singha Masters, Singha Classic
- 2013 Singha Hua Hin Open

=== Thai LPGA Tour wins (5) ===
No.	Date	Tournament	Winning score	To par	Margin of victory	Runner-up	Ref.
1	28 Dec 2012	6th Singha-SAT Thai LPGA Championship	202	−14	2 strokes	(Thailand) Nontaya Srisawang	
2	16 Aug 2013	Thailand LPGA Masters	207	−9	1 stroke	(Thailand) Thidapa Suwannapura	
3	5 Sep 2014	Thailand LPGA Masters (2)	207	−9	4 strokes	(Thailand) Rungthiwa Pangjan, (Thailand) Nontaya Srisawang	
4	18 Sep 2015	PTT Thailand LPGA Masters (3)	207	−9	2 strokes	(Thailand) Budsabakorn Sukapan	
5	19 Feb 2016	Bangchak Thai LPGA Open	205	−11	1 stroke	(Thailand) Sherman Santiwiwatthanaphong	

=== Other wins (1) ===
- 2012 HSBC Brazil Cup (unofficial LPGA Tour event)

== Results in LPGA majors ==
Results not in chronological order.

Tournament	2010	2011	2012	2013	2014	2015	2016	2017	2018	2019
Chevron Championship		72	T56	T13	T39	T64	CUT	T27	15	T26
Women's PGA Championship		T25	T36	T44	CUT	CUT	CUT	CUT	CUT	T14
U.S. Women's Open	CUT		T28	T46	T7	CUT	T32	T39	CUT	T16
The Evian Championship ^				T52	CUT	T20	T55	T26	T61	CUT
Women's British Open		CUT	CUT	CUT	T27	CUT	CUT	CUT	2	T44

Tournament	2020	2021	2022	2023	2024	2025	2026
Chevron Championship	CUT	T50	T44	CUT		CUT	CUT
U.S. Women's Open	CUT	CUT	CUT				
Women's PGA Championship	T48	CUT	T54	T39	CUT	CUT	T53
The Evian Championship ^	NT	T54	T31				CUT
Women's British Open		CUT					

^ The Evian Championship was added as a major in 2013

Top 10
Did not play

CUT = missed the half-way cut
NT = no tournament
T = tied

=== Summary ===
Tournament	Wins	2nd	3rd	Top-5	Top-10	Top-25	Events	Cuts made
Chevron Championship	0	0	0	0	0	2	15	10
Women's PGA Championship	0	0	0	0	0	2	16	8
U.S. Women's Open	0	0	0	0	1	2	12	6
The Evian Championship	0	0	0	0	0	1	10	7
Women's British Open	0	1	0	1	1	1	10	3
Totals	0	1	0	1	2	8	63	34

- Most consecutive cuts made – 5 (2018 British – 2019 PGA)
- Longest streak of top-10s – 1 (twice)

== LPGA Tour career summary ==
Year	Tournaments played	Cuts made	Wins	2nd	3rd	Top 10s	Best finish	Earnings ($)	Money list rank	Scoring average	Scoring rank
2009	5	4	0	0	0	0	T37	16,113	n/a	72.38	n/a
2010	1	0	0	0	0	0	MC	0	n/a	79.00	n/a
2011	17	15	0	0	0	0	T13	149,657	57	72.55	43
2012	26	20	0	0	0	0	T12	217,557	55	72.43	52
2013	25	22	0	0	2	7	3	600,210	23	71.36	27
2014	26	22	0	1	1	7	2	735,031	20	71.36	20
2015	28	21	0	1	1	3	T2	445,383	38	71.56	38
2016	27	24	0	1	0	5	2	617,724	30	71.15	32
2017	28	22	0	0	0	3	4	447,393	45	71.39	51
2018	27	21	0	1	0	2	2	534,304	43	71.66	62
2019	24	17	0	0	0	0	T14	318,027	64	71.49	67
2020	12	7	0	0	0	0	T25	58,924	102	72.30	81
2021	25	14	0	0	0	1	T6	167,410	89	71.77	84
2022	27	21	0	0	0	1	4	438,951	59	71.45	76
2023	21	13	0	0	0	1	T10	189,480	100	71.97	99
2024	10	5	0	0	0	0	T29	45,129	164	71.60	n/a
2025	15	9	0	0	0	1	T10	189,723	108	71.58	78

- Official through the 2025 season

== Epson Tour summary ==
Year	Tournaments played	Cuts made	Wins	2nd	3rd	Top 10s	Best finish	Earnings ($)	Money list rank	Scoring average	Scoring rank
2009	13	10	0	1	0	2	T2	16,981	35	72.83	28
2010	15	12	0	1	1	6	T2	39,261	10	70.76	4
2024	10	9	1	1	0	4	1	88,458	10	69.58	1

== Team appearances ==
Amateur

- Queen Sirikit Cup (representing Thailand): 2005

Professional

- International Crown (representing Thailand): 2014, 2016, 2018
- Amata Friendship Cup (representing Thailand): 2018 (winners)
