= Wassawan Sangkapong =

Thai professional golfer (born 1997)

Personal information
- Nickname: Mim
- Nationality: Thailand
- Born: 29 May 1997 (age 29) Nonthaburi, Thailand
- Height: 175 cm (5 ft 9 in)

Career
- Sport: Golf
- College: Gardner–Webb University; North Carolina State University
- Turned professional: 2020
- Current tours: Ladies European Tour; Thai LPGA Tour
- Professional wins: 2

Wassawan Sangkapong (Thai: วรรษวัลย์ สังขพงษ์; born 29 May 1997), also known as Mim Sangkapong, is a Thai professional golfer. She has played on the Ladies European Tour and has won twice on the Thai LPGA Tour.

== Amateur career ==
Sangkapong is from Nonthaburi, Thailand. She attended Mahidol University International Demonstration School in Nakhon Pathom province. She began playing golf after discovering a driving range during the 2011 Thailand floods.

She attended Gardner–Webb University as a freshman in 2016–17 and during the fall of 2017, before transferring to North Carolina State University in the spring of 2018. At NC State, she competed for the NC State Wolfpack women's golf team through the 2019–20 season.

== Professional career ==
Sangkapong turned professional in 2020 after graduating from college and returning to Thailand during the COVID-19 pandemic. At 2021 Ladies European Tour Q-School, she finished tied for 37th at the Final Qualifier to earn Category 15 status for the 2022 season.

In March 2023, Sangkapong won the SAT–NSDF Thai LPGA Classic on the Thai LPGA Tour at Royal Hills Golf Resort and Spa in Nakhon Nayok province. She finished at eight-under-par and won by four strokes.

In September 2023, Sangkapong won the BGC Thailand LPGA Masters, a Thai LPGA Tour and Taiwan LPGA Tour co-sanctioned event. She finished at 11-under-par and won by one stroke.

== Professional wins (2) ==
=== Thai LPGA Tour wins (2) ===
No.	Date	Tournament	Winning score	To par	Margin of victory	Runner-up	Ref.
1	10 Mar 2023	SAT–NSDF Thai LPGA Classic	69-70-69=208	−8	4 strokes	(Thailand) Cholcheva Wongras	
2	8 Sep 2023	BGC Thailand LPGA Masters^{1}	72-67-66=205	−11	1 stroke	(Thailand) Thanita Muangkhumsakul	

^{1} Co-sanctioned by the Taiwan LPGA Tour

=== Taiwan LPGA Tour wins (1) ===
No.	Date	Tournament	Winning score	To par	Margin of victory	Runner-up	Ref.
1	8 Sep 2023	BGC Thailand LPGA Masters^{1}	72-67-66=205	−11	1 stroke	(Thailand) Thanita Muangkhumsakul	

^{1} Co-sanctioned by the Thai LPGA Tour
