= Ladies European Thailand Championship =

Coordinates: 12.8160°N 100.9539°E

Tournament information
- Location: Pattaya, Thailand
- Established: 2017
- Courses: Phoenix Gold Golf & Country Club
- Par: 72
- Tours: Ladies European Tour; Thai LPGA Tour
- Format: Stroke play
- Prize fund: €300,000
- Month played: June

Current champion
- (Thailand) Atthaya Thitikul

Location in Thailand

The Ladies European Thailand Championship is a professional golf tournament on the Ladies European Tour and Thai LPGA Tour, first played in 2017.

Atthaya Thitikul became the youngest ever winner on the Ladies European Tour by claiming victory in the 2017 championship on 9 July 2017, aged 14 years, 4 months and 19 days, beating the previous record held by Lydia Ko who won the 2013 New Zealand Women's Open as an amateur aged 15 years, 9 months and 17 days. Due to Thitikul's amateur status the top prize of €45,000 went to second placed Ana Menéndez of Mexico.

== Winners ==
| Year | Winner | Country | Score | Margin of victory | Runner-up | Winner's share (€) |
|---|---|---|---|---|---|---|
| 2019 | Atthaya Thitikul (a) (2) | Thailand | 266 (−22) | 5 strokes | (Germany) Esther Henseleit | 45,000 |
| 2018 | Kanyalak Preedasuttijit | Thailand | 273 (−15) | 1 stroke | (South Korea) Selin Hyun (a) | 45,000 |
| 2017 | Atthaya Thitikul (a) | Thailand | 283 (−5) | 2 strokes | (Mexico) Ana Menéndez | 45,000 |
