= Thai LPGA Tour =

Women's professional golf tour

- Sport: Golf
- Founded: 2008
- Country: Thailand
- Related competitions: Thailand LPGA Masters
- Website: thailandlpga.or.th

The Thai LPGA Tour is a women's professional golf tour in Thailand, organized by the Thailand Ladies Professional Golf Association. Founded in 2008, the tour operates as a domestic tournament circuit for female professional golfers in Thailand.

The tour expanded during the 2010s with support from the Sports Authority of Thailand and private sponsors. Its season-ending tournament, the Thailand LPGA Masters, became a co-sanctioned event with international tours and awarded Women's World Golf Rankings points. In December 2022, the Thai LPGA Tour was added to the Women's World Golf Rankings system, with ranking points awarded from the 2023 season.

== History ==
The Thailand Ladies Professional Golf Association was founded in 2008, with Somporn Juangroongruangkit serving as its first president. In its early years, the Thai LPGA organized four to six tournaments per year. The tour expanded in 2013 with support from the Sports Authority of Thailand, which allocated prize-money support for seven Thai LPGA events.

The Thailand LPGA Masters became the tour's season-ending tournament and was later sanctioned by international tours, including the ALPG Tour and the China LPGA Tour. The tournament awarded Women's World Golf Rankings points during its co-sanctioned period. In December 2022, the Thai LPGA Tour was added to the Women's World Golf Rankings system, with ranking points awarded to tour events beginning in 2023.

== Schedule and results ==
=== 2026 season ===
Date	Tournament	Location	Purse (฿)	Winner (Note: The number in brackets after each winner's name is the number of Thai LPGA Tour events she had won up to and including that tournament. This information is only shown for Thai LPGA Tour members.)	WWGR points	Ref
22 Mar	Singha-SAT Royal Hua Hin Ladies Championship	Prachuap Khiri Khan	1,500,000	(Thailand) Navaporn Soontreeyapas (2)	2.0	
12 Apr	Singha-SAT Ladies Open	Chiang Mai	2,000,000	(Thailand) Navaporn Soontreeyapas (3)	1.9	
8 May	Singha-NSDF Nakhon Nayok Ladies Championship	Nakhon Nayok	1,500,000	(Thailand) Achiraya Sriwong (a) (2)	2.0	
5 Jun	Singha-SAT Ladies Championship	Prachuap Khiri Khan	1,500,000	(Thailand) Achiraya Sriwong (a) (3)	1.7	
19 Jun	Singha-SAT Chonburi Ladies Championship	Chonburi	2,000,000	(Thailand) Thitaree Visavapattamawan (a) (1)	2.1	
10 Jul	Singha-NSDF Ladies Championship	Samut Prakan	1,500,000	(Thailand) Kultida Pramphun (3)	2.3	
24 Jul	Singha-NSDF Ladies Open	Bangkok	1,500,000	(Thailand) Jaravee Boonchant (2)	2.3	
7 Aug	Singha-NSDF Chonburi Ladies Championship	Chonburi	1,500,000	(Thailand) Pattharat Rattanawan (2)	2.2	
4 Sep	Singha-SAT Prachin Buri Ladies Championship	Prachinburi	1,500,000	(Thailand) Achiraya Sriwong (4)	1.9	
19 Sep	Singha-SAT Thai LPGA Masters	Khon Kaen	4,000,000	(Thailand) Budsabakorn Sukapan (5)	2.0	

=== 2025 season ===
Date	Tournament	Location	Purse (฿)	Winner	WWGR points	Ref
6 Mar	Singha-SAT Nakhon Ratchasima Ladies Championship	Nakhon Ratchasima	1,500,000	(Thailand) Thanita Muangkhumsakul (4)	2	
21 Mar	Singha-SAT Prachin Buri Ladies Championship	Prachinburi	1,500,000	(Thailand) Kritchanya Kaopattanaskul (a) (1)	2	
11 Apr	Singha-NSDF Chonburi Ladies Championship	Chonburi	1,500,000	(Thailand) Patcharajutar Kongkraphan (12)	3	
25 Apr	Singha-NSDF Pattaya Ladies Open	Chonburi	2,000,000	(Thailand) Cholcheva Wongras (3)	3	
18 May	Singha-SAT Experience at Trang An Open	Vietnam	1,500,000	(Vietnam) Lê Chúc An (a) (1)	2	
6 Jun	Singha-SAT Nakhon Nayok Ladies Championship	Nakhon Nayok	1,500,000	(Thailand) Kan Bunnabodee (2)	2	
20 Jun	Singha-NSDF Royal Hua Hin Ladies Championship	Prachuap Khiri Khan	1,500,000	(Thailand) Thanaporn Palitwanon (1)	3	
25 Jul	Singha-SAT Thai LPGA Ladies Open	Chiang Mai	2,000,000	(Thailand) Eila Galitsky (a) (2)	2	
29 Aug	Singha-NSDF Bangkok Ladies Championship	Nakhon Nayok	1,500,000	(Thailand) Achiraya Sriwong (a) (1)	3	
20 Sep	Singha-SAT Thai LPGA Masters	Khon Kaen	4,000,000	(Philippines) Florence Yvon Bisera (1)	3	

=== 2024 season ===
Date	Tournament	Location	Purse (฿)	Winner	WWGR points	Ref
19 Apr	Singha-SAT Hua Hin Ladies Championship	Prachuap Khiri Khan	1,200,000	(Thailand) Tunrada Piddon (1)	2	
24 May	Singha-SAT Nakhon Nayok Ladies Championship	Nakhon Nayok	1,200,000	(Thailand) Navaporn Soontreeyapas (1)	2	
31 May	Singha-SAT Bangkok Ladies Championship	Nakhon Nayok	1,200,000	(Thailand) Cholcheva Wongras (1)	2	
5 Jul	Singha-NSDF Royal Hua Hin 100th	Prachuap Khiri Khan	2,500,000	(Thailand) Pakin Kawinpakorn (1)	2	
19 Jul	Singha-NSDF Pattaya Ladies Championship	Chonburi	1,200,000	(Thailand) Cholcheva Wongras (2)	2	
2 Aug	Singha-SAT Prachin Buri Ladies Championship	Prachinburi	1,200,000	(Thailand) Pattharat Rattanawan (1)	2	
23 Aug	Singha-NSDF Lamphun Ladies Championship	Lamphun	1,200,000	(Thailand) Patcharajutar Kongkraphan (10)	3	
30 Aug	Singha-SAT Thai LPGA Ladies Open	Chiang Mai	2,500,000	(Thailand) Budsabakorn Sukapan (4)	3	
13 Sep	Singha-NSDF Muan Suen	Khon Kaen	1,200,000	(Thailand) Eila Galitsky (a) (1)	2	
21 Sep	Singha-SAT Thai LPGA Masters	Prachuap Khiri Khan	4,000,000	(Thailand) Patcharajutar Kongkraphan (11)	3	

=== 2023 season ===
Date	Tournament	Location	Purse (฿)	Winner	WWGR points	Other tours (Note: TLPGA − Taiwan LPGA Tour.)	Ref
3 Feb	BGC Championship	Nakhon Nayok	1,200,000	(Thailand) Natthakritta Vongtaveelap (4)	2		
17 Feb	NSDF Ladies Classic	Chonburi	1,200,000	(Thailand) Natthakritta Vongtaveelap (5)	2		
10 Mar	SAT-NSDF Thai LPGA Classic	Nakhon Nayok	1,200,000	(Thailand) Wassawan Sangkapong (1)	2		
31 Mar	Singha Pattaya Ladies Open	Chonburi	2,500,000	(Thailand) Arpichaya Yubol (9)	2		
28 Apr	Singha-BGC Muan Suen	Khon Kaen	1,200,000	(Thailand) Punpaka Phuntumabamrung (2)	2		
5 May	Singha-BGC Classic	Nakhon Ratchasima	1,200,000	(Thailand) Patcharajutar Kongkraphan (8)	2		
9 Jun	Thai LPGA Classic	Samut Prakan	1,200,000	(Thailand) Budsabakorn Sukapan (3)	2		
14 Jul	SAT-NSDF Ladies Open	Ratchaburi	1,200,000	(Thailand) Nicha Kanpai (a) (1)	2		
11 Aug	Thai LPGA Championship	Prachuap Khiri Khan	2,500,000	(Thailand) Patcharajutar Kongkraphan (9)	2		
8 Sep	BGC Thailand LPGA Masters	Prachuap Khiri Khan	4,000,000	(Thailand) Wassawan Sangkapong (2)	3	TLPGA	

=== 2022 season ===
Date	Tournament	Location	Purse (฿)	Winner	Other tours (Note: TLPGA − Taiwan LPGA Tour.)	Ref.
18 Mar	BGC 1st Thai LPGA Championship	Nakhon Nayok	2,500,000	(Thailand) Saraporn Chamchoi (2)		
1 Apr	SAT-NSDF 2nd Thai LPGA Championship	Lopburi	1,200,000	(Thailand) Natthakritta Vongtaveelap (a) (3)		
22 Apr	Singha Pattaya Ladies Open	Chonburi	2,500,000	(Thailand) Chanettee Wannasaen (1)		
13 May	SAT-NSDF 3rd Thai LPGA Championship	Nakhon Pathom	1,200,000	(Thailand) Kultida Pramphun (2)		
27 May	Singha-BGC 4th Thai LPGA Championship	Nakhon Nayok	1,200,000	(Thailand) Aunchisa Utama (2)		
10 Jun	SAT-NSDF 5th Thai LPGA Championship	Kanchanaburi	1,200,000	(Thailand) Chanettee Wannasaen (2)		
1 Jul	Singha-BGC 6th Thai LPGA Championship	Khon Kaen	1,200,000	(Thailand) Wannasiri Sirisampant (1)		
26 Jul	Muang Thai Insurance; 7th Thai LPGA Championship	Phetchaburi	1,200,000	(Thailand) Patcharajutar Kongkraphan (5)		
5 Aug	Central Group 8th Thai LPGA Championship	Samut Prakan	1,200,000	(Thailand) Patcharajutar Kongkraphan (6)		
9 Sep	BGC Thailand LPGA Masters	Prachuap Khiri Khan	4,000,000	(Thailand) Patcharajutar Kongkraphan (7)	TLPGA	

=== 2021 season ===
Date	Tournament	Location	Purse (฿)	Winner	Ref.
2 Jul	SAT-NSDF 1st Thai LPGA Championship	Kanchanaburi	1,200,000	(Thailand) Patcharajutar Kongkraphan (4)	
16 Jul	Singha-BGC Narai 2nd Thai LPGA Championship	Lopburi	1,200,000	(Thailand) Natthakritta Vongtaveelap (a) (1)	
27 Aug	BGC 3rd Thai LPGA Championship	Khon Kaen	1,200,000	(Thailand) Sherman Santiwiwatthanaphong (2)	
2 Sep	Singha-BGC 4th Thai LPGA Championship	Khon Kaen	1,200,000	(Thailand) Natthakritta Vongtaveelap (a) (2)	
24 Sep	BGC-Betagro 5th Thai LPGA Championship	Prachuap Khiri Khan	1,200,000	(Thailand) Sherman Santiwiwatthanaphong (3)	
1 Oct	Muang Thai Insurance 6th Thai LPGA Championship	Phetchaburi	1,200,000	(Thailand) Trichat Cheenglab (2)	
22 Oct	Singha-BGC 7th Thai LPGA Championship	Nakhon Nayok	1,200,000	(Thailand) Arpichaya Yubol (7)	
29 Oct	Singha-BGC 8th Thai LPGA Championship	Nakhon Nayok	1,200,000	(Thailand) Arpichaya Yubol (8)	
12 Nov	BGC-Betagro Thai LPGA Super Six Match Play	Prachuap Khiri Khan	1,200,000	(Thailand) Chonlada Chayanun (3)	
3 Dec	BGC Thailand LPGA Masters	Bangkok	4,000,000	(Thailand) Jaravee Boonchant (1)	

=== 2020 season ===
Date	Tournament	Location	Purse (฿)	Winner	Ref.
15 Feb	1st Singha-SAT Thai LPGA Championship	Bangkok	1,000,000	(Thailand) Parinda Phokan (7)	
10 Jul	2nd Singha-SAT Thai LPGA Championship	Prachuap Khiri Khan	1,400,000	(Thailand) Kan Bunnabodee (a) (1)	
24 Jul	3rd Singha-SAT Thai LPGA Championship	Prachinburi	1,000,000	(Thailand) Atthaya Thitikul (3)	
8 Aug	4th Singha-SAT Thai LPGA Championship	Nakhon Nayok	1,000,000	(Thailand) Wichanee Meechai (2)	
29 Aug	5th Singha-SAT Thai LPGA Championship	Nakhon Nayok	1,000,000	(Thailand) Panitta Yusabai (1)	
19 Sep	6th Singha-SAT Thai LPGA Championship	Nakhon Ratchasima	1,000,000	(Thailand) Atthaya Thitikul (4)	
10 Oct	7th Singha-SAT Thai LPGA Championship	Khon Kaen	1,000,000	(Thailand) Atthaya Thitikul (5)	
31 Oct	8th Singha-SAT Thai LPGA Championship	Prachinburi	1,000,000	(Thailand) Atthaya Thitikul (6)	
20 Nov	Muang Thai Insurance Thailand LPGA Masters	Nakhon Nayok	4,000,000	(Thailand) Atthaya Thitikul (7)	

=== 2019 season ===
Date	Tournament	Location	Purse (฿)	Winner	Other tours (Note: ALPG − ALPG Tour, CLPGA − China LPGA Tour, LET − Ladies European Tour.)	Ref
1 Mar	1st Singha-SAT Thai LPGA Championship	Prachinburi	1,000,000	(Thailand) Supamas Sangchan (2)		
15 Mar	2nd Singha-SAT Thai LPGA Championship	Nakhon Nayok	1,000,000	(Thailand) Kultida Pramphun (1)		
5 Apr	3rd Singha-SAT Thai LPGA Championship	Rayong	1,000,000	(Thailand) Arpichaya Yubol (6)		
26 Apr	4th Singha-SAT Thai LPGA Championship	Nakhon Ratchasima	1,000,000	(Thailand) Chonlada Chayanun (1)		
16 May	5th Singha-SAT Thai LPGA Championship	Phetchaburi	1,000,000	(Thailand) Trichat Cheenglab (1)		
23 Jun	Ladies European Thailand Championship	Chonburi	€300,000	(Thailand) Atthaya Thitikul (a) (2)	LET	
12 Jul	6th Singha-SAT Thai LPGA Championship	Khon Kaen	1,000,000	(Thailand) Chommapat Pongthanarak (1)		
26 Jul	7th Singha-SAT Thai LPGA Championship	Prachuap Khiri Khan	1,000,000	(Thailand) Kusuma Meechai (1)		
9 Aug	8th Singha-SAT Thai LPGA Championship	Nakhon Nayok	1,000,000	(Thailand) Chonlada Chayanun (2)		
6 Sep	Trust Golf Thailand LPGA Masters	Bangkok	4,000,000	(China) Zhang Weiwei (n/a)	ALPG, CLPGA	

=== 2018 season ===
Date	Tournament	Location	Purse (฿)	Winner	Other tours (Note: ALPG − ALPG Tour, CLPGA − China LPGA Tour, LET − Ladies European Tour.)	Ref
16 Mar	1st Singha-SAT Thai LPGA Championship	Nakhon Nayok	1,000,000	(Thailand) Manuschaya Zeemakorn (a) (1)		
6 Apr	2nd Singha-SAT Thai LPGA Championship	Prachinburi	1,000,000	(Thailand) Wanchana Poruangrong (3)		
20 Apr	3rd Singha-SAT Thai LPGA Championship	Nakhon Ratchasima	1,000,000	(Thailand) Parinda Phokan (5)		
3 May	4th Singha-SAT Thai LPGA Championship	Prachuap Khiri Khan	1,000,000	(Thailand) Arpichaya Yubol (1)		
8 Jun	5th Singha-SAT Thai LPGA Championship	Rayong	1,000,000	(Thailand) Arpichaya Yubol (2)		
24 Jun	Ladies European Thailand Championship	Chonburi	€300,000	(Thailand) Kanyalak Preedasuttijit (2)	LET	
13 Jul	6th Singha-SAT Thai LPGA Championship	Prachuap Khiri Khan	1,000,000	(Thailand) Arpichaya Yubol (3)		
3 Aug	7th Singha-SAT Thai LPGA Championship	Khon Kaen	1,000,000	(Thailand) Arpichaya Yubol (4)		
17 Aug	8th Singha-SAT Thai LPGA Championship	Chiang Mai	1,000,000	(Thailand) Arpichaya Yubol (5)		
21 Sep	PTT Thailand LPGA Masters	Bangkok	4,000,000	(Thailand) Parinda Phokan (6)	ALPG, CLPGA	

=== 2017 season ===
Date	Tournament	Location	Purse (฿)	Winner	Other tours (Note: ALPG − ALPG Tour, CLPGA − China LPGA Tour, LET − Ladies European Tour.)	Ref
28 Apr	1st Singha-SAT-Toyota Thai LPGA Championship	Nakhon Nayok	1,000,000	(Thailand) Pajaree Anannarukarn (a) (4)		
26 May	2nd Singha-SAT-Toyota Thai LPGA Championship	Nakhon Ratchasima	1,000,000	(Thailand) Kanyalak Preedasuttijit (1)		
22 Jun	3rd Singha-SAT-Toyota Thai LPGA Championship	Prachuap Khiri Khan	1,000,000	(Thailand) Renuka Suksukont (1)		
9 Jul	Ladies European Thailand Championship	Chonburi	€300,000	(Thailand) Atthaya Thitikul (a) (1)	LET	
14 Jul	4th Singha-SAT-Toyota Thai LPGA Championship	Prachinburi	1,000,000	(Thailand) Parinda Phokan (2)		
28 Jul	5th Singha-SAT-Toyota Thai LPGA Championship	Prachuap Khiri Khan	1,000,000	(Thailand) Parinda Phokan (3)		
11 Aug	6th Singha-SAT-Toyota Thai LPGA Championship	Prachinburi	1,000,000	(Thailand) Dussavi Soopimjit (1)		
18 Aug	7th Singha-SAT-Toyota Thai LPGA Championship	Chiang Mai	1,000,000	(Thailand) Budsabakorn Sukapan (2)		
1 Sep	8th Singha-SAT-Toyota Thai LPGA Championship	Rayong	1,000,000	(Thailand) Parinda Phokan (4)		
15 Sep	PTT Thailand LPGA Masters	Bangkok	4,000,000	(Thailand) Saranporn Langkulgasettrin (2)	ALPG, CLPGA	

=== 2016 season ===
Date	Tournament	Location	Purse (฿)	Winner	Other tours (Note: ALPG − ALPG Tour)	Ref
19 Feb	Bangchak Thai LPGA Open	Bangkok	1,000,000	(Thailand) Pornanong Phatlum (5)		
7 Apr	1st Singha-SAT Thai LPGA Championship	Nakhon Ratchasima	800,000	(Thailand) Kanphanitnan Muangkhumsakul (3)		
29 Apr	2nd Singha-SAT Thai LPGA Championship	Nakhon Nayok	800,000	(Thailand) Pajaree Anannarukarn (a) (2)		
27 May	3rd Singha-SAT Thai LPGA Championship	Bangkok	800,000	(Thailand) Chakansim Khamborn (a) (1)		
17 Jun	4th Singha-SAT Thai LPGA Championship	Prachuap Khiri Khan	800,000	(Thailand) Dolnapa Phudthipinij (1)		
1 Jul	5th Singha-SAT Thai LPGA Championship	Prachinburi	800,000	(Thailand) Pajaree Anannarukarn (a) (3)		
22 Jul	6th Singha-SAT Thai LPGA Championship	Prachuap Khiri Khan	800,000	(Thailand) Pinrath Loomboonruang (1)		
5 Aug	7th Singha-SAT Thai LPGA Championship	Khon Kaen	800,000	(Thailand) Wanchana Poruangrong (2)		
19 Aug	8th Singha-SAT Thai LPGA Championship	Chiang Mai	800,000	(Thailand) Saranporn Langkulgasettrin (1)		
23 Sep	Idemitsu-SAT Thailand LPGA Masters	Bangkok	4,000,000	(Thailand) Pannarat Thanapolboonyaras (1)	ALPG	

=== 2015 season ===
Date	Tournament	Location	Purse (฿)	Winner	Ref
9 Jan	1st Singha-SAT Thai LPGA Championship	Bangkok	800,000	(Thailand) Pavarisa Yoktuan (3)	
20 Feb	2nd Singha-SAT Thai LPGA Championship	Nakhon Ratchasima	800,000	(Thailand) Onnarin Sattayabanphot (1)	
13 Mar	3rd Singha-SAT Thai LPGA Championship	Prachinburi	800,000	(Thailand) Jaruporn Palakawong Na Ayutthaya (2)	
3 Apr	4th Singha-SAT Thai LPGA Championship	Prachuap Khiri Khan	800,000	(Thailand) Kanphanitnan Muangkhumsakul (2)	
15 May	5th Singha-SAT Thai LPGA Championship	Nakhon Nayok	800,000	(Thailand) Parinda Phokan (a) (1)	
3 Jul	Bangchak Thai LPGA Open	Bangkok	1,000,000	(Thailand) Punpaka Phuntumabamrung (1)	
17 Jul	6th Singha-SAT Thai LPGA Championship	Prachuap Khiri Khan	800,000	(Thailand) Supamas Sangchan (1)	
31 Jul	7th Singha-SAT Thai LPGA Championship	Khon Kaen	800,000	(Thailand) Wanchana Poruangrong (1)	
21 Aug	8th Singha-SAT Thai LPGA Championship	Chiang Mai	800,000	(Thailand) Pathamaporn Ariyamatepreecha (1)	
18 Sep	PTT Thailand LPGA Masters	Bangkok	3,000,000	(Thailand) Pornanong Phatlum (4)	

=== 2014 season ===
Date	Tournament	Location	Purse (฿)	Winner	Ref
20 Dec 2013	1st Singha-SAT Thai LPGA Championship	Nakhon Nayok	500,000	(Thailand) Saraporn Chamchoi (1)	
31 Jan	2nd Singha-SAT Thai LPGA Championship	Bangkok	500,000	(Thailand) Budsabakorn Sukapan (a) (1)	
14 Feb	3rd Singha-SAT Thai LPGA Championship	Nakhon Ratchasima	500,000	(Philippines) Dottie Ardina (1)	
14 Mar	4th Singha-SAT Thai LPGA Championship	Prachinburi	500,000	(Thailand) Pajaree Anannarukarn (a) (1)	
25 Apr	5th Singha-SAT Thai LPGA Championship	Bangkok	500,000	(Thailand) Pavarisa Yoktuan (2)	
16 May	6th Singha-SAT Thai LPGA Championship	Prachuap Khiri Khan	500,000	(Thailand) Pimpadsorn Sangkagaro (1)	
12 Jun	7th Singha-SAT Thai LPGA Championship	Prachuap Khiri Khan	500,000	(Thailand) Benyapa Niphatsophon (a) (1)	
4 Jul	8th Singha-SAT Thai LPGA Championship	Nakhon Nayok	500,000	(Thailand) Sherman Santiwiwatthanaphong (1)	
25 Jul	9th Singha-SAT Thai LPGA Championship	Prachinburi	500,000	(Thailand) Wad Phaewchimplee (a) (1)	
8 Aug	10th Singha-SAT Thai LPGA Championship	Nakhon Ratchasima	500,000	(Thailand) Pimpadsorn Sangkagaro (2)	
5 Sep	Thailand LPGA Masters	Bangkok	3,000,000	(Thailand) Pornanong Phatlum (3)	

=== 2013 season ===
Date	Tournament	Location	Purse (฿)	Winner	Ref
8 Feb	1st Singha-SAT Thai LPGA Championship	Nakhon Ratchasima	500,000	(Thailand) Patcharajutar Kongkraphan (3)	
3 Apr	2nd Singha-SAT Thai LPGA Championship	Prachuap Khiri Khan	500,000	(Thailand) Nontaya Srisawang (6)	
17 May	3rd Singha-SAT Thai LPGA Championship	Bangkok	500,000	(Thailand) Wichanee Meechai (1)	
7 Jun	4th Singha-SAT Thai LPGA Championship	Prachuap Khiri Khan	500,000	(Thailand) Jaruporn Palakawong Na Ayutthaya (1)	
5 Jul	5th Singha-SAT Thai LPGA Championship	Nakhon Nayok	500,000	(Thailand) Kanphanitnan Muangkhumsakul (1)	
16 Aug	Thailand LPGA Masters	Bangkok	1,500,000	(Thailand) Pornanong Phatlum (2)	
6 Sep	6th Singha-SAT Thai LPGA Championship	Nakhon Ratchasima	500,000	(Thailand) Pavarisa Yoktuan (1)	
20 Sep	7th Singha-SAT Thai LPGA Championship	Nakhon Nayok	500,000	(Philippines) Jayvie Agojo (1)	

=== 2012 season ===
Date	Tournament	Location	Purse (฿)	Winner	Ref
27 Apr	1st Singha-SAT Thai LPGA Championship	Bangkok	500,000	(Thailand) Patcharajutar Kongkraphan (2)	
18 May	2nd Singha-SAT Thai LPGA Championship	Samut Prakan	500,000	(Thailand) Nontaya Srisawang (3)	
29 Jun	3rd Singha-SAT Thai LPGA Championship	Bangkok	500,000	(Thailand) Nontaya Srisawang (4)	
31 Aug	4th Singha-SAT Thai LPGA Championship	Samut Prakan	500,000	(Thailand) Nontaya Srisawang (5)	
28 Sep	5th Singha-SAT Thai LPGA Championship	Bangkok	500,000	(Thailand) Aunchisa Utama (1)	
28 Dec	6th Singha-SAT Thai LPGA Championship	Bangkok	500,000	(Thailand) Pornanong Phatlum (1)	

=== 2011 season ===
Date	Tournament	Location	Purse (฿)	Winner	Ref
13 May	1st SAT-Thai LPGA Championship	Chonburi	500,000	(Thailand) Porani Chutichai (2)	
14 Jul	2nd SAT-Thai LPGA Championship	Chonburi	500,000	(Thailand) Patcharajutar Kongkraphan (1)	
25 Aug	3rd SAT-Thai LPGA Championship	Chonburi	500,000	(Thailand) Titiya Plucksataporn (1)	
28 Sep	4th SAT-Thai LPGA Championship	Nakhon Nayok	500,000	(Thailand) Tiranan Yoopan (2)	

=== 2010 season ===
Date	Tournament	Location	Purse (฿)	Winner	Ref
5 Mar	1st SAT-TLPGA Championship	Chonburi	500,000	(Thailand) Nontaya Srisawang (2)	
18 Jun	2nd SAT-TLPGA Championship	Chonburi	500,000	(Thailand) Thidapa Suwannapura (a) (1)	
15 Jul	3rd SAT-TLPGA Championship	Chonburi	500,000	(Thailand) Tanaporn Kongkiatkrai (1)	
19 Aug	4th SAT-TLPGA Championship	Chonburi	500,000	(Thailand) Narisara Kerdrit (1)	
16 Sep	5th SAT-TLPGA Championship	Nakhon Nayok	500,000	(Thailand) Yupaporn Kawinpakorn (a) (1)	
5 Nov	6th SAT-TLPGA Championship	Chonburi	500,000	(Thailand) Russamee Gulyanamitta (1)	

=== 2009 season ===
Date	Tournament	Location	Purse (฿)	Winner	Ref
	Singha Thai LPGA Championship	Chonburi		(Thailand) Ornthana Chuenarrom (1)	
2 Apr	Thai Summit TLPGA Championship	Chonburi	300,000	(Thailand) Nontaya Srisawang (1)	
12 Jun	2nd Thai LPGA Championship	Chonburi		(Thailand) Tiranan Yoopan (1)	
20 Aug	Thai TLPGA Open	Chonburi	1,000,000	(Malaysia) Jean Chua (1)	
22 Oct	Cario Thai LPGA Championship	Chonburi		(Thailand) Porani Chutichai (1)	

== Order of Merit winners ==
Year	Player	Earnings (฿)	Ref
2026	(Thailand) Navaporn Soontreeyapas	674,917	
2025	(Thailand) Cholcheva Wongras	679,375	
2024	(Thailand) Cholcheva Wongras	760,716	
2023	(Thailand) Patcharajutar Kongkraphan	1,035,304	
2022	(Thailand) Patcharajutar Kongkraphan	1,450,650	
2021	(Thailand) Patcharajutar Kongkraphan	671,033	
2020	(Thailand) Atthaya Thitikul	697,650	
2019	(Thailand) Chonlada Chayanun	488,224	
2018	(Thailand) Arpichaya Yubol	795,389	
2017	(Thailand) Parinda Phokan	748,528	
2016	(Thailand) Saranporn Langkulgasettrin	553,610	
2015	(Thailand) Supamas Sangchan	374,970	
2014	(Thailand) Kanphanitnan Muangkhumsakul	291,508	
2013	(Thailand) Pavarisa Yoktuan	203,033	
