= Trust Golf Links Series =

Golf tournament

Tournament information
- Location: United Kingdom
- Established: 2022
- Course: Ramside Hall GC
- Par: 73
- Tour: LET Access Series
- Format: 54-hole Stroke play
- Prize fund: €40,000
- Month played: July

Tournament record score
- Aggregate: 206 Arpichaya Yubol
- To par: –11 Chanettee Wannasaen

Current champion
- (Austria) Katharina Muehlbauer

The Trust Golf Links Series is a series of women's professional golf tournaments on the LET Access Series, held in the United Kingdom.

The inaugural series in 2022 was held at Ramside Hall in England and Musselburgh in Scotland, while the 2023 tournaments were both held at Ramside Hall in the North of England.

In 2022, the top two players earned starts in the Trust Golf Women's Scottish Open.

== Winners ==
Year	Date	Venue	Winner	Score	Margin of victory	Runner(s)-up	Prize fund (€)
2022	8 Jul	Ramside Hall	(Thailand) Chanettee Wannasaen	−11 (71-64-73=208)	3 strokes	(Thailand) Arpichaya Yubol	40,000
2022	16 Jul	Musselburgh	(Thailand) Arpichaya Yubol	−10 (71-68-67=206)	5 strokes	(Netherlands) Lauren Holmey (a) (Germany) Patricia Isabel Schmidt	40,000
2023	21 Jul	Ramside Hall	(England) Lianna Bailey	−6 (71-67-75=213)	1 stroke	(Republic of Ireland) Lauren Walsh	40,000
2023	26 Jul	Ramside Hall	(Austria) Katharina Muehlbauer	−10 (68-70-68=206)	3 strokes	(England) Hannah Screen	40,000
