= Pannarat Thanapolboonyaras =

Thai professional golfer

Personal information
- Nickname: Saipan
- Nationality: Thailand
- Born: 29 December 1997 (age 28) Roi Et, Thailand
- Height: 170 cm (5 ft 7 in)

Career
- Sport: Golf
- Turned professional: 2015
- Current tours: LPGA Tour (joined 2016); Symetra Tour
- Professional wins: 4

Number of wins by tour
- WPGA Tour of Australasia: 1
- Other: 3

Best results in LPGA major championships
- Chevron Championship: CUT: 2019
- Women's PGA C'ship: T33: 2018
- U.S. Women's Open: CUT: 2019
- Women's British Open: T22: 2018
- Evian Championship: T26: 2018

Pannarat Thanapolboonyaras (Thai: ปัณณรัตน์ ธนพลบุญรัศมิ์; born 29 December 1997) is a Thai professional golfer playing on the LPGA Tour.

== Professional career ==
Thanapolboonyaras turned professional in 2015. In December 2015, she finished tied for 15th place at the final stage LPGA Qualifying Tournament to earn LPGA Membership for the 2016 season. On the 2016 LPGA Tour, she was the youngest player on the tour. She played 18 events and made seven cuts. She recorded a career-best finish on the LPGA Tour at the Manulife LPGA Classic in Ontario, Canada with a tied for 22nd place.

On 23 September 2016, Thanapolboonyaras claimed her first ALPG Tour win at the Thailand LPGA Masters which was co-sanctioned by the Thai LPGA Tour. In 2017, she was on the top of the Ladies Asian Golf Tour money list.

In 2018, Thanapolboonyaras played 23 events on the LPGA Tour and made nine cuts. She recorded the first top-10 finish of her LPGA Tour career at the Blue Bay LPGA in China where she tied for 10th place.

== Amateur wins ==
- 2011 Singha Junior World Championship
- 2012 Singha Thailand Junior World
- 2013 TGA-Singha Junior Ranking 2

== Professional wins (4) ==
=== ALPG Tour wins (1) ===
- 2016 Thailand LPGA Masters^

^ Co-sanctioned by the Thai LPGA Tour

=== Thai LPGA Tour wins (1) ===
- 2016 Thailand LPGA Masters†

† Co-sanctioned by the ALPG Tour

=== All Thailand Golf Tour wins (1) ===
- 2015 Singha E-San Open (as an amateur)

=== JLPGA Step Up Tour wins (2) ===
- 2023 ECC Ladies Golf Tournament, Kanehide Miyarabi Open

== Results in LPGA majors ==
Results not in chronological order before 2019

Tournament	2016	2017	2018	2019	2020	2021
Chevron Championship				CUT		
U.S. Women's Open				CUT		
Women's PGA Championship	CUT	CUT	T33	CUT		
The Evian Championship			T26		NT	
Women's British Open			T22			CUT

Did not play

CUT = missed the half-way cut
NT = no tournament
"T" = tied

== Team appearances ==
Amateur

- Espirito Santo Trophy (representing Thailand): 2014

Professional

- Amata Friendship Cup (representing Thailand): 2018 (winners)
