= Patcharajutar Kongkraphan =

Thai professional golfer

Personal information
- Nickname: PK
- Nationality: Thailand
- Born: 14 February 1992 (age 34) Khon Kaen, Thailand
- Height: 173 cm (5 ft 8 in)

Career
- Sport: Golf
- Turned professional: 2009
- Current tours: China LPGA Tour; Taiwan LPGA Tour; Thai LPGA Tour; LPGA of Korea Tour (from 2026)
- Former tours: LPGA Tour (2012–2019); Epson Tour
- Professional wins: 37

Number of wins by tour
- Ladies Asian Golf Tour: 1
- Epson Tour: 1
- Other: 35

Best results in LPGA major championships
- Chevron Championship: CUT: 2015, 2016
- Women's PGA C'ship: 73rd: 2015
- U.S. Women's Open: CUT: 2013
- Women's British Open: CUT: 2014
- Evian Championship: CUT: 2014, 2015, 2016

Achievements and awards
- Symetra Tour Player of the Year: 2013
- Thai LPGA Tour Order of Merit: 2021, 2022, 2023
Medal record
Asian Games
Gold medal – first place	2022 Hangzhou	Team
SEA Games
Gold medal – first place	2007 Nakhon Ratchasima	Individual
Gold medal – first place	2007 Nakhon Ratchasima	Team

Patcharajutar Kongkraphan (Thai: พัชรจุฑา คงกระพันธ์; born 14 February 1992), also known as P.K. Kongkraphan, is a Thai professional golfer. She has competed on the LPGA Tour, Epson Tour, China LPGA Tour, Taiwan LPGA Tour and Thai LPGA Tour. Kongkraphan was the Symetra Tour Player of the Year in 2013 and has represented Thailand at the Asian Games and SEA Games, winning team gold at the 2022 Asian Games and individual and team gold medals at the 2007 SEA Games.

== Early life ==
Kongkraphan was born on 14 February 1992. She started playing golf at the age of 5 years old.

== Amateur career ==
As an amateur, Kongkraphan represented Thailand at the 2006 Asian Games, where the Thai women's team finished seventh. At the 2007 SEA Games, she won gold medals in the women's individual and team events.She also represented Thailand at the 2008 Espirito Santo Trophy.

== Professional career ==
Kongkraphan turned professional in November 2009. In 2011, she finished tied for 29th at the LPGA Qualifying Tournament to earn LPGA membership for the 2012 season.

In 2012, she played three events on the LPGA Tour, with her best finish being tied for 45th at the Jamie Farr Toledo Classic. She also won the Enjoy Jakarta Indonesia Ladies Open on the Ladies Asian Golf Tour.

In 2013, she competed mainly on the Symetra Tour. She won the Northeast Delta Dental International and recorded five top-10 finishes. Kongkraphan topped the tour's money list, was named Symetra Tour Player of the Year, and earned LPGA Tour status for the 2014 season.

In 2014, Kongkraphan made 11 cuts from 24 starts on the LPGA Tour. She recorded her first two LPGA top-10 finishes, tying for seventh at both the Pure Silk-Bahamas LPGA Classic and the Swinging Skirts LPGA Classic, and carded a career-low round of 64 in the final round of the Manulife Financial LPGA Classic.

In 2015, she played 21 LPGA Tour events and made 11 cuts. She made the cut in a major championship for the first time at the 2015 Women's PGA Championship, finishing 73rd. In 2016, she made 11 cuts from 23 LPGA starts, with a season-best finish of tied for ninth at the Meijer LPGA Classic. She continued to play on the LPGA Tour through 2019.

After her LPGA Tour tenure, Kongkraphan returned mainly to Asian professional circuits. In 2021, she won the SAT-NSDF 1st Thai LPGA Championship and finished first on the Thai LPGA Tour Order of Merit.

In 2022, she won three consecutive events on the Thai LPGA Tour, including the season-ending BGC Thailand LPGA Masters, and retained the Order of Merit title. She remained among the leading players on the Thai LPGA Tour, winning further events in 2023 and 2024.

Kongkraphan also had success on the Taiwan LPGA Tour, including a win at the 2024 ICTSI Luisita Ladies International. In 2025, she won six Taiwan LPGA Tour events, including the CTBC Ladies Open, TrustGolf Asian Mixed #3 and Taiwan Mobile Ladies Open. At the Trust Golf Asian Mixed Match 3 at Lake View Resort and Golf Club in Cha-am, she closed with a final-round 61 and finished at 21-under-par 192, two strokes ahead of Poom Saksansin.

== Professional wins (37) ==
=== Epson Tour wins (1) ===
No.	Date	Tournament	Winning score	To par	Margin of victory	Runner-up	Ref.
1	21 Jul 2013	Northeast Delta Dental International	68-68-71=207	−9	Playoff	(United States) Michelle Shin	

=== Ladies Asian Golf Tour wins (1) ===
No.	Date	Tournament	Winning score	To par	Margin of victory	Runner-up	Ref.
1	20 Oct 2012	Enjoy Jakarta Indonesia Ladies Open	209	−7	3 strokes	(Taiwan) Hsieh Yu-ling	

=== All Thailand Golf Tour wins (3) ===
No.	Date	Tournament	Winning score	To par	Margin of victory	Runner-up	Ref.
1	5 Jul 2009	Singha Classic					
2	20 Dec 2009	Singha Championship					
3	1 Jul 2011	Singha E-San Open	208	−8	3 strokes	(Thailand) Panuma Wittayakorrakomol	

=== Thai LPGA Tour wins (12) ===
No.	Date	Tournament	Winning score	To par	Margin of victory	Runner(s)-up	Ref.
1	14 Jul 2011	2nd SAT-Thai LPGA; Championship	207	−9			
2	27 Apr 2012	1st Singha-SAT; Thai LPGA Championship	68-70-69=207	−9	3 strokes	(Thailand) Thidapa Suwannapura	
3	8 Feb 2013	1st Singha-SAT; Thai LPGA Championship	68-73-66=207	−9	1 stroke	(Thailand) Chantima Galyanamitta	
4	2 Jul 2021	SAT-NSDF 1st Thai LPGA Championship	67-67-71=205	−11	1 stroke	(Thailand) Natthakritta Vongtaveelap (a)	
5	22 Jul 2022	Muang Thai Insurance 7th Thai LPGA Championship	69-65-63=197	−19	3 strokes	(Thailand) Chonlada Chayanun	
6	5 Aug 2022	Central Group 8th Thai LPGA Championship	67-68-71=206	−10	Playoff	(Thailand) Chonlada Chayanun	
7	9 Sep 2022	BGC Thailand LPGA Masters^{1}	68-64-66=198	−18	1 stroke	(Thailand) Chonlada Chayanun	
8	5 May 2023	Singha-BGC Classic	66-72-68=206	−10	2 strokes	(Thailand) Supamas Sangchan	
9	11 Aug 2023	Thai LPGA Championship	70-70-73=213	−3	Playoff	(Thailand) Phannarai Meesom-us	
10	23 Aug 2024	Singha-NSDF Lamphun; Ladies Championship	68-70-69=207	−9	3 strokes	(Thailand) Pattharat Rattanawan	
11	21 Sep 2024	Singha-SAT Thai LPGA Masters	69-67-68=204	−12	5 strokes	(Thailand) Kamonwan Lueamsri	
12	11 Apr 2025	Singha-NSDF Chonburi; Ladies Championship	70-69-70=209	−7	Playoff	(Thailand) Prima Thammaraks, (Thailand) Thanita Muangkhumsakul	

^{1}Co-sanctioned by the Taiwan LPGA Tour

=== China LPGA Tour wins (4) ===
No.	Date	Tournament	Winning score	To par	Margin of victory	Runner(s)-up	Ref.
1	5 Jun 2010	Orient Shanghai Classic	72-72-65=209	−7	2 strokes	(China) Li Jiayun	
2	3 Jul 2010	Orient Beijing Pearl Championship	69-76-69=214	−2	1 stroke	(Taiwan) Yu Pei Lin	
3	28 May 2011	Beijing Pearl Challenge	70-70-68=208	−8	4 strokes	(Thailand) Porani Chutichai, (Taiwan) Yao Hsuan-yu	
4	24 Jun 2011	Caofeidian Challenge	71-72-69=212	−4	1 stroke	(Thailand) Thidapa Suwannapura	

=== Taiwan LPGA Tour wins (14) ===
No.	Date	Tournament	Winning score	To par	Margin of victory	Runner(s)-up	Ref.
1	9 Sep 2022	BGC Thailand LPGA Masters^{1}	68-64-66=198	−18	1 stroke	(Thailand) Chonlada Chayanun	
2	20 May 2023	WPG Ladies Open	67-71-68=206	−10	3 strokes	(Taiwan) Shih Cheng-hsuan	
3	29 Jun 2023	Friends of TLPGA Open	74-75-64=213	−3	2 strokes	(Taiwan) Wenny Chang, (Thailand) Samaporn Khangkhun, (Taiwan) Chen Ing-Jie	
4	4 Aug 2023	GRIN Cup Charity Open	68-72-68=208	−8	10 strokes	(Thailand) Kornkamol Sukaree	
5	25 Apr 2024	ICTSI Luisita; Ladies International	71-66-74=211	−5	3 strokes	(Philippines) Harmie Constantino, (Taiwan) Wu Chih-yun, (Taiwan) Chen Hsuan	
6	18 May 2024	WPG Ladies Open	67-74-69-67=277	−11	4 strokes	(Japan) Yuna Arakawa, (Taiwan) Wang Li-ning, (Taiwan) Shih Cheng-hsuan, (Taiwan) An Ho-yu	
7	18 Oct 2024	Jing-Mao Ladies Open	69-69-70=208	−11	2 strokes	(Taiwan) An Ho-yu, (Thailand) Wannasiri Sirisampant	
8	8 Nov 2024	Sampo Ladies Open; Xiu Ju Cup	70-68-71=209	−7	1 stroke	(Taiwan) Jessica Peng	
9	17 May 2025	CTBC Ladies Open^{2}	70-68-68=206	−10	3 strokes	(Thailand) Chonlada Chayanun, (Thailand) Chayanit Wangmahaporn	
10	6 Jun 2025	Taiwan Prosperity; Ladies Open	70-70-70=210	−9	1 stroke	(Thailand) Prima Thammaraks, (Thailand) Nanthikarn Raksachat	
11	22 Aug 2025	Trust Golf Asian Mixed #3^{3}	67-64-61=192	−21	2 strokes	(Thailand) Poom Saksansin	
12	17 Oct 2025	Jing-Mao Ladies Open	66-68-68=202	−14	Playoff	(Taiwan) Yu Han-hsuan, (Taiwan) Chang Ya-chi	
13	12 Dec 2025	Taya Group Ladies Open	67-70-69=206	−10	Playoff	(Taiwan) Tsai Pei-ying	
14	19 Dec 2025	Taiwan Mobile; Ladies Open	70-69-70=209	−7	1 stroke	(South Korea) Jeong Seul-gi	

^{1}Co-sanctioned by the Thai LPGA Tour
^{2}Co-sanctioned by the LPGA of Japan Step Up Tour
^{3}Mixed event with the Taiwan PGA Tour

=== JLPGA Step Up Tour wins (1) ===
No.	Date	Tournament	Winning score	To par	Margin of victory	Runner(s)-up	Ref.
1	17 May 2025	CTBC Ladies Open^{1}	70-68-68=206	−10	3 strokes	(Thailand) Chonlada Chayanun, (Thailand) Chayanit Wangmahaporn	

^{1}Co-sanctioned by the Taiwan LPGA Tour

=== Thai WPGA Tour wins (3) ===
No.	Date	Tournament	Winning score	To par	Margin of victory	Runner(s)-up	Ref.
1	15 Jul 2022	4th SAT−TWT Open; Road To World Ranking	68-69-69=206	−10	5 strokes	(Thailand) Ornnicha Konsunthea	
2	29 Jul 2022	5th SAT−TWT Open; Road To World Ranking	70-70-65=205	−11	2 strokes	(Thailand) Aunchisa Utama, (Philippines) Princess Mary Superal	
3	2 Sep 2022	7th SAT−TWT Open; Road To World Ranking	68-65-65=198	−18	5 strokes	(Thailand) Arpichaya Yubol	

== Results in LPGA majors ==
Results not in chronological order.

Tournament	2013	2014	2015	2016	2017	2018	2019
The Chevron Championship			CUT	CUT			
U.S. Women's Open	CUT						
Women's PGA Championship			73	CUT		CUT	CUT
The Evian Championship		CUT	CUT	CUT			
Women's British Open		CUT	WD				

Did not play

CUT = missed the half-way cut
WD = withdrew
T = tied

== Team appearances ==
- Asian Games (representing Thailand): 2006, 2022 (winners)
- SEA Games (representing Thailand): 2007 (winners)
- Espirito Santo Trophy (representing Thailand): 2008
