= Reliance Matrix Championship =

Golf tournament in Nevada

Tournament information
- Location: Las Vegas, Nevada
- Established: 2025
- Course: Spanish Trail Country Club
- Par: 72
- Length: 6,735 yards (6,158 m)
- Tour: Epson Tour
- Format: Stroke play (72 holes)
- Prize fund: $250,000
- Month played: May

Tournament record score
- Aggregate: 262 Cholcheva Wongras (2026)
- To par: −26 as above

Current champion
- (Thailand) Cholcheva Wongras

Location map
- Location in Nevada Spanish Trail Country Club (Nevada)

The Reliance Matrix Championship is a professional golf tournament on the Epson Tour, the official qualifying tour of the LPGA. Established in 2025, the event is held at Spanish Trail Country Club in Las Vegas, Nevada. The tournament was announced in January 2025 as a new Epson Tour event and the tour's first stop in Las Vegas.

The inaugural tournament was played from May 1 to 4, 2025, with a $250,000 purse and a 72-hole format. It was the Epson Tour's debut in Southern Nevada.

In 2025, Yana Wilson won the inaugural event for her first Epson Tour victory. In 2026, rookie Cholcheva Wongras won the tournament by five strokes and set a new tour 72-hole scoring record at 26-under par.

== Course ==
The tournament is played at Spanish Trail Country Club, a 27-hole private golf facility in Las Vegas designed by Robert Trent Jones Jr. The tournament utilizes a composite 18-hole course consisting of the Canyon and Lakes nines. The facility also serves as the home course for the UNLV women's golf team.

From 1986 to 1990, Spanish Trail Country Club was a host venue for the Las Vegas Invitational on the PGA Tour. For the 2026 event, the course was set to a total length of 6,735 yards (6,158 m) with a par of 72.

== Winners ==
Year	Winner	Score	To par	Margin of victory	Runner(s)-up	Purse ($)	Winner's share ($)	Ref.
2026	(Thailand) Cholcheva Wongras	262	−26	5 strokes	(China) Zeng Liqi	250,000	37,500	
2025	(United States) Yana Wilson	271	−17	2 strokes	(China) Mohan Du	250,000	37,500	

Note: Green highlight indicates scoring records.

== Tournament records ==
Year	Player	Score	Round	Ref.
2026	(Thailand) Cholcheva Wongras	61 (−11)	2nd	
