= Zhang Weiwei (golfer) =

Chinese professional golfer

Personal information
- Nationality: China
- Born: 15 March 1997 (age 29) Hubei, China
- Height: 5 ft 4 in (163 cm)

Career
- Sport: Golf
- Turned professional: 2017
- Current tours: LPGA Tour (joined 2022); Epson Tour (joined 2021); LPGA of Japan Tour (joined 2017); China LPGA Tour (joined 2015)
- Professional wins: 6

Number of wins by tour
- WPGA Tour of Australasia: 1
- Other: 5

Best results in LPGA major championships
- Chevron Championship: T13: 2024
- Women's PGA C'ship: T37: 2026
- U.S. Women's Open: CUT: 2017, 2026
- Women's British Open: T49: 2024
- Evian Championship: T70: 2025

Zhang Weiwei (born 15 March 1997) is a Chinese professional golfer and LPGA Tour player. She has five titles on the China LPGA Tour, including the 2019 Trust Golf Thailand LPGA Masters.

== Career ==
Zhang was born in Hubei and started playing golf at 9 years old. She moved to Hainan and began playing on the China LPGA Tour (CLPGA) in 2015. In her rookie season, she was runner-up behind Babe Liu at the Zhuhai Classic, and tied for third at the Bank of Qingdao Golden Mountain Challenge.

In 2017, she won her first title on the CLPGA, the Zhuhai Hengqin Phoenix Tree Building Challenge. She played on the LPGA of Japan Tour in 2017 and 2018, where her best finish was a tie for 5th at the 2018 Yamaha Ladies Open Katsuragi. She also won a title on the Japan Step Up Tour, the development circuit. She shot a hole-in-one in the third round of the 2017 Earth Mondahmin Cup.

Back on the CLPGA in 2019, Zhang collected a record four titles. With her win at the Trust Golf Thailand LPGA Masters she became the first player to win four times in one season on the CLPGA.

In 2021, Zhang joined the Epson Tour, where she recorded four top-10 finishes including a runner-up finish at the Prasco Charity Championship. At the end of the year she finished T35 in the LPGA Q-School to earn membership for the 2022 LPGA Tour, where her season-best result was a tie for 10th at the Portland Classic. She kept her card for 2023 by finishing T38 at Q-Series.

== Professional wins (6) ==
=== China LPGA Tour wins (5) ===
- 2017 (1) Zhuhai Hengqin Phoenix Tree Building Challenge
- 2019 (4) Hangzhou International Championship, Orient Masters Wuhan Challenge, Le Coq Sportif Beijing Ladies Classic, Trust Golf Thailand LPGA Masters^

^ Co-sanctioned by China LPGA Tour, ALPG Tour and Thai LPGA Tour.

=== ALPG Tour wins (1) ===
- 2019 Trust Golf Thailand LPGA Masters^

=== Thai LPGA Tour wins (1) ===
- 2019 Trust Golf Thailand LPGA Masters^

=== Japan Step Up Tour (1) ===
- 2017 Sky Ladies ABC Cup

== Results in LPGA majors ==
Results not in chronological order.

Tournament	2017	2018	2019	2020	2021	2022	2023	2024	2025	2026
Chevron Championship								T13	T14	T67
U.S. Women's Open	CUT									CUT
Women's PGA Championship								CUT	CUT	T37
The Evian Championship				NT				CUT	T70	CUT
Women's British Open								T49	CUT	CUT

Did not play

CUT = missed the half-way cut
NT = no tournament
T = tied

== Team appearances ==
Amateur

- Espirito Santo Trophy (representing China): 2012

Professional

- International Crown (representing China): 2025
