= Golf at the 2022 Asian Games – Women's team =

Golf – Women's team at the 2022 Asian Games
- Venue: West Lake International Golf Course
- Date: 28 September 2023 – 1 October 2023
- Competitors: 37 from 14 nations

Medalists
gold medal	Thailand; Eila Galitsky; Patcharajutar Kongkraphan; Arpichaya Yubol
silver medal	South Korea; Yoo Hyun-jo; Lim Ji-yoo; Kim Min-sol
bronze medal	China; Yin Ruoning; Liu Yu; Lin Xiyu

The women's individual competition at the 2022 Asian Games in Hangzhou, China was held from 28 September to 1 October 2023 at the West Lake International Golf Course.

== Schedule ==
All times are China Standard Time (UTC+08:00)

Date	Time	Event
Saturday, 28 September 2023	10:30	Round 1
Sunday, 29 September 2023	10:30	Round 2
Monday, 30 September 2023	10:00	Round 3
Tuesday, 1 October 2023	07:30	Round 4

== Results ==
Rank	Team	Round				Total	To par
Rank	Team	1	2	3	4	Total	To par
1st place, gold medalist(s)	Thailand (THA)	136	132	136	138	542	−34
	Arpichaya Yubol	67	65	69	68		
	Patcharajutar Kongkraphan	~~69~~	67	~~70~~	70		
	Eila Galitsky	69	~~70~~	67	~~73~~		
2nd place, silver medalist(s)	South Korea (KOR)	137	140	135	136	548	−28
	Yoo Hyun-jo	68	~~73~~	66	65		
	Kim Min-sol	69	68	69	~~71~~		
	Lim Ji-yoo	~~70~~	72	~~72~~	71		
3rd place, bronze medalist(s)	China (CHN)	134	133	139	146	552	−24
	Lin Xiyu	~~67~~	67	68	73		
	Yin Ruoning	67	66	~~74~~	73		
	Liu Yu	67	~~68~~	71	~~74~~		
4	India (IND)	138	134	131	151	554	−22
	Aditi Ashok	67	66	61	~~77~~		
	Pranavi Sharath Urs	71	68	70	75		
	Avani Prashanth	~~72~~	~~69~~	~~74~~	76		
5	Japan (JPN)	134	139	139	147	559	−17
	Mamika Shinchi	69	70	71	70		
	Mizuki Hashimoto	~~70~~	69	~~76~~	~~82~~		
	Saki Baba	65	~~72~~	68	77		
6	Chinese Taipei (TPE)	139	139	141	150	569	−7
	Huang Ting-Hsuan	68	~~73~~	69	~~76~~		
	Chien Pei-Yun	71	70	~~72~~	76		
	Tsai Pei-Ying	~~73~~	69	72	74		
7	Hong Kong (HKG)	142	140	146	143	571	−5
	Sophie Han	71	~~70~~	73	~~72~~		
	Arianna Lau	71	70	73	72		
	Chan Tsz Ching	~~73~~	70	~~74~~	71		
8	Singapore (SGP)	143	139	146	151	579	+3
	Koh Sock Hwee	69	70	75	~~77~~		
	Amanda Tan	74	69	71	75		
	Aloysa Margiela Mabutas Atienza	~~76~~	~~77~~	~~79~~	76		
9	Philippines (PHI)	140	146			286	−2
	Rianne Mikhaela Malixi	68	70				
	Lois Kaye Go	72	76				
10	Vietnam (VIE)	149	155			304	+16
	Ngo Bao Nghi	74	75				
	Le Chuc An	75	80				
11	Kazakhstan (KAZ)	157	152			309	+21
	Rivekka Jumagulova	76	72				
	Albina Agayeva	81	80				
	Islamiya Abeldi	~~82~~	~~85~~				
12	Pakistan (PAK)	162	157			319	+31
	Parkha Ijaz	78	77				
	Rimsha Ijaz	84	80				
13	Nepal (NEP)	180	174			354	+66
	Kashmira Shah	92	83				
	Susma Sigdel	88	91				
14	Mongolia (MGL)	183	176			359	+71
	Telmen Khasar	90	84				
	Ichinnorov Dolgorsuren	93	92				
