= Natthakritta Vongtaveelap =

Thai professional golfer

Personal information
- Nickname: Sim
- Nationality: Thailand
- Born: 8 November 2002 (age 23) Bangkok, Thailand
- Height: 6 ft 0 in (183 cm)

Career
- Sport: Golf
- Turned professional: 2022
- Current tours: China LPGA Tour; Thai LPGA Tour
- Former tour: LPGA Tour
- Professional wins: 6

Best results in LPGA major championships
- Chevron Championship: CUT: 2023
- Women's PGA C'ship: CUT: 2023
- U.S. Women's Open: DQ: 2023
- Women's British Open: DNP
- Evian Championship: DNP
Medal record
Women's golf
Representing Thailand
SEA Games
Gold medal – first place	2021 Hanoi	Individual
Gold medal – first place	2021 Hanoi	Team

Natthakritta Vongtaveelap (Thai: ณัฐกฤตา วงศ์ทวีลาภ; born 8 November 2002) is a Thai professional golfer playing on the LPGA Tour.

== Early life and amateur career ==
Born in 2002, Vongtaveelap began playing golf at a very young age. As an amateur, she had a very successful career and got the titles at several events, including the 2021 and 2022 Singha Thailand Amateur Open, 2021 Singha Thailand Amateur Match Play Championship, and 2022 Singha Thailand Amateur Match Play Championship. She also ended up as a runner-up twice in the 2021 and 2022 Women's Amateur Asia-Pacific Championship.

In May 2022, she represented Thailand at the 2021 SEA Games and won two gold medals.

== Professional career ==
Vongtaveelap turned professional in November 2022. In December 2022, she finished tied for 28th at the LPGA Q-Series to earn her LPGA Tour membership for the 2023 season.

=== 2023 ===
Vongtaveelap won her first event as a pro on the Thai LPGA Tour at the BGC Championship in February 2023. Two weeks later, she triumphed for her second consecutive Thai LPGA title at the NSDF Ladies Classic.

In late February, she made her LPGA debut at the Honda LPGA Thailand after winning the qualifying tournament in January and got the sponsor invitation. she took a four-shot lead at 20-under-par after 54 holes and attempted to be the first LPGA member to win on her first LPGA start but lost to Lilia Vu by one stroke in the final round. This runner-up finish made her moved into the top 100 on the Women's World Golf Rankings for the first time with a rank of 91.

In July, Vongtaveelap was disqualified from the first round of the U.S. Women's Open after her caddie, Jinsup Kim, used a distance-measuring device on multiple holes.

== Amateur wins ==
- 2018 TGA-Singha Junior Golf Champion, TGA-Singha Junior Ranking #2, FCG Callaway World Championship, TGA-Singha Junior Ranking #4, TGA-Singha Junior Golf Championship
- 2019 National Team Ranking #3, TGA-Singha Junior Ranking #3, TGA-Singha Junior Ranking #5
- 2020 National Team Ranking #1, Thailand Junior Development Tour Master Championship, TGA-Singha Junior Ranking #2, TGA-Singha Junior Ranking #3, TGA-Singha Junior Ranking #4, TGA-Singha Junior Ranking #5
- 2021 National Team Ranking #1, National Team Ranking #2, National Team Ranking #3, TGA-Singha Junior Ranking #6, National Team Ranking #4, National Team Ranking #5, National Team Ranking #6, Winner Amateur Championship, National Team Ranking #7, Singha Thailand Amateur Match Play Championship, Singha Thailand Amateur Open, Singha Thailand Ladies Amateur Open
- 2022 National Team Ranking #1, National Team Ranking #2, Singha Thailand Amateur Match Play Championship, SEA Games (women's individual), Singha Thailand Amateur Open

== Professional wins (6) ==
=== Thai LPGA Tour wins (5) ===
- 2021 (2) Singha-BGC Narai 2nd Thai LPGA Championship,^{[1]} Singha-BGC 4th Thai LPGA Championship^{[1]}
- 2022 (1) SAT-NSDF 2nd Thai LPGA Championship^{[1]}
- 2023 (2) BGC Championship, NSDF Ladies Classic

^{1} Vongtaveelap won the event as an amateur.

=== China LPGA Tour wins (1) ===
- 2026 (1) Chongqing Women's Open

== Results in LPGA majors ==
! Tournament	2023
Chevron Championship	CUT
Women's PGA Championship	CUT
U.S. Women's Open	DQ
The Evian Championship	
Women's British Open	

Did not play

CUT = missed the half-way cut
DQ = disqualified
"T" = tied

=== Summary ===
Tournament	Wins	2nd	3rd	Top-5	Top-10	Top-25	Events	Cuts made
Chevron Championship	0	0	0	0	0	0	1	0
Women's PGA Championship	0	0	0	0	0	0	1	0
U.S. Women's Open	0	0	0	0	0	0	1	0
The Evian Championship	0	0	0	0	0	0	0	0
Women's British Open	0	0	0	0	0	0	0	0
Totals	0	0	0	0	0	0	3	0

== World ranking ==
Position in Women's World Golf Rankings at the end of each calendar year.

Year	World ranking	Source
2022	756	
2023	134	
2024	252	
2025	761	

== Team appearances ==
- SEA Games (representing Thailand): 2021 (winners)
- Queen Sirikit Cup (representing Thailand): 2018, 2019, 2022
