= Aunchisa Utama =

Thai professional golfer

Personal information
- Nickname: Jan
- Nationality: Thailand
- Born: 27 December 1990 (age 35) Bangkok, Thailand
- Height: 162 cm (5 ft 4 in)

Career
- Sport: Golf
- College: Ramkhamhaeng University
- Turned professional: 2012
- Current tour: Ladies European Tour (joined 2024)
- Professional wins: 4

Number of wins by tour
- Ladies European Tour: 1
- Other: 3

Best results in LPGA major championships
- Chevron Championship: DNP
- Women's PGA C'ship: DNP
- U.S. Women's Open: DNP
- Women's British Open: T61: 2026
- Evian Championship: DNP

Aunchisa Utama (Thai: อัญชิสา อุตมะ; born 27 December 1990) is a Thai professional golfer who competes on the Ladies European Tour (LET). She won the Dutch Ladies Open in 2026 for her first Ladies European Tour title. She has also won twice on the Thai LPGA Tour and finished runner-up at the 2024 Joburg Ladies Open.

== Amateur career ==
Utama represented Ramkhamhaeng University as an amateur. In January 2011, she won the women's individual title and was part of the team that won the women's team title at the 38th Thailand University Games. In December, she won the women's individual title at the inaugural Asian University Golf Championship. Later that month, she won the women's event at the B-Ing TPC Championships on the All Thailand Golf Tour as an amateur.

== Professional career ==
Utama turned professional in 2012. In September that year, she won the fifth Singha-SAT Thai LPGA Championship at Panya Indra Golf Club, finishing at five-under-par 211 for her first Thai LPGA Tour title.

In May 2022, Utama won the Singha-BGC Thai LPGA Championship at Royal Hills Golf Resort and Spa. She finished regulation play tied with Princess Mary Superal at six-under-par 210 and won on the second playoff hole. In May 2023, she finished runner-up to Denwit Boriboonsub in a playoff at the Thailand Mixed Cup. In December, she finished third at the final stage of Ladies European Tour qualifying school and earned playing status for the 2024 season.

In April 2024, during her first season on the Ladies European Tour, Utama finished second at the Joburg Ladies Open, seven strokes behind Chiara Tamburlini.

In June 2026, Utama won her first Ladies European Tour title at the Dutch Ladies Open. She closed with a six-under-par 66 to finish at nine-under 207, then defeated Norway's Dorthea Forbrigd with a birdie on the first playoff hole. The victory earned her a place in the 2026 AIG Women's Open, her first major championship appearance. She made the cut and finished tied for 61st at 11-over-par 295.

== Professional wins (4) ==
=== Ladies European Tour wins (1) ===
No.	Date	Tournament	Winning score	To par	Margin of victory	Runner-up	Ref.
1	21 Jun 2026	Dutch Ladies Open	70-71-66=207	−9	Playoff	(Norway) Dorthea Forbrigd	

Ladies European Tour playoff record (1–0)

No.	Year	Tournament	Opponents	Result
1	2026	Dutch Ladies Open	(Norway) Dorthea Forbrigd	Won with birdie on first extra hole

=== Thai LPGA Tour wins (2) ===
No.	Date	Tournament	Winning score	To par	Margin of victory	Runner-up	Ref.
1	28 Sep 2012	5th Singha-SAT Thai LPGA Championship	211	−5	2 strokes	(Thailand) Pitsaon Chaichompoo (a)	
2	27 May 2022	Singha-BGC 4th Thai LPGA Championship	67-71-72=210	−6	Playoff	(Philippines) Princess Mary Superal	

=== All Thailand Golf Tour wins (1) ===
- 2011 (1) B-Ing TPC Championships (as an amateur)

== Results in LPGA majors ==
Tournament	2026
Chevron Championship	
U.S. Women's Open	
Women's PGA Championship	
The Evian Championship	
Women's British Open	T61

Did not play

"T" = tied
