= Chanettee Wannasaen =

Thai professional golfer (born 2004)

Personal information
- Nickname: Proud
- Nationality: Thailand
- Born: 16 April 2004 (age 22) Chiang Mai, Thailand
- Height: 5 ft 2 in (157 cm)

Career
- Sport: Golf
- Turned professional: 2021
- Current tour: LPGA Tour (since 2023)
- Former tours: Epson Tour; LET Access Series; Thai LPGA Tour
- Professional wins: 10

Number of wins by tour
- LPGA Tour: 2
- Other: 8

Best results in LPGA major championships
- Chevron Championship: T18: 2025
- Women's PGA C'ship: T2: 2025
- U.S. Women's Open: CUT: 2024, 2025, 2026
- Women's British Open: T20: 2026
- Evian Championship: T17: 2024

Chanettee Wannasaen (Thai: ชเนตตี วรรณแสน; born 16 April 2004) is a Thai professional golfer playing on the LPGA Tour.

Wannasaen turned professional in 2021. In 2022, she won six tournaments in Thailand and one on the LET Access Series. She secured her first LPGA Tour victory at the 2023 Portland Classic as a Monday qualifier. She later won the 2024 Dana Open and tied for second at the 2025 Women's PGA Championship, her best finish in a major championship.

== Early life ==
Wannasaen was born on 16 April 2004 in Chiang Mai, Thailand.

== Professional career ==
Wannasaen turned professional in 2021. She won the national qualifier tournament to play in the Honda LPGA Thailand in both 2021 and 2022.

=== 2022 ===
In 2022, Wannasaen won six tournaments in Thailand, including the first three events of the Thailand Mixed series. On 8 July, she won the Trust Golf Links Series on the LET Access Series at Ramside Hall Golf Club in Durham, England. Later that month, she tied for 24th at the Trust Golf Women's Scottish Open and earned a place in the Women's British Open. In December, she tied for sixth at the qualifying school to earn her card for the 2023 LPGA Tour.

=== 2023 ===
On 3 September, Wannasaen won her first LPGA Tour title at the Portland Classic. Entering the field as a Monday qualifier, she shot a tournament record 26-under-par 262 to win by four strokes over Lin Xiyu. She became the third Monday qualifier to win on the LPGA Tour, and the first since Brooke Henderson in 2015. Prior to this event, Wannasaen was ranked 367th in the Women's World Golf Rankings; following the victory, her ranking rose to 52nd.

=== 2024 ===
In July 2024, Wannasaen won her second LPGA Tour title at the Dana Open in Ohio. She finished at 20-under-par 264, winning by one stroke over Ryu Hae-ran. She concluded the 2024 season with four top-10 finishes and surpassed $1 million in season earnings for the first time.

=== 2025 ===
In June 2025, Wannasaen tied for second place at the 2025 Women's PGA Championship in Texas. She finished at 1-under-par 287, three strokes behind champion Minjee Lee. This result marked her first top-10 finish in a major championship. Later in the year, she represented Thailand at the 2025 International Crown and recorded a total of three top-10 finishes over the season.

== Amateur wins ==
- 2019 Singha Thailand Amateur Match Play Championship
- 2020 National Team Ranking #5, National Team Ranking #6

== Professional wins (10) ==
=== LPGA Tour wins (2) ===
Legend
Major championships (0)
Other LPGA Tour (2)

No.	Date	Tournament	Winning score	To par	Margin of victory	Runner-up	Winner's share ($)
1	3 Sep 2023	Portland Classic	68-66-65-63=262	−26	4 strokes	(China) Lin Xiyu	225,000
2	21 Jul 2024	Dana Open	66-65-66-67=264	−20	1 stroke	(South Korea) Ryu Hae-ran	262,500

=== LET Access Series wins (1) ===
No.	Date	Tournament	Winning score	To par	Margin of victory	Runner-up
1	8 Jul 2022	Trust Golf Links Series - Ramside Hall	71-64-73=208	−11	3 strokes	(Thailand) Arpichaya Yubol

=== Thai LPGA Tour wins (2) ===
- 2022 (2) Singha Pattaya Ladies Open, SAT-NSDF 5th Thai LPGA Championship

=== Other wins (5) ===
- 2021 (1) SAT-TWT Open Road to World Ranking
- 2022 (4) Thailand Mixed #1, Thailand Mixed #2, Thailand Mixed #3, SAT-TWT Open Road to World Ranking

== Results in LPGA majors ==
Results not in chronological order.

Tournament	2022	2023	2024	2025	2026
Chevron Championship			T46	T18	CUT
U.S. Women's Open			CUT	CUT	CUT
Women's PGA Championship			CUT	T2	CUT
The Evian Championship			T17	T43	CUT
Women's British Open	CUT		CUT	CUT	T20

Top 10
Did not play

CUT = missed the half-way cut
"T" = tied

=== Summary ===
Tournament	Wins	2nd	3rd	Top-5	Top-10	Top-25	Events	Cuts made
Chevron Championship	0	0	0	0	0	1	3	2
U.S. Women's Open	0	0	0	0	0	0	3	0
Women's PGA Championship	0	1	0	1	1	1	3	1
The Evian Championship	0	0	0	0	0	1	3	2
Women's British Open	0	0	0	0	0	1	4	1
Totals	0	1	0	1	1	4	16	6

- Most consecutive cuts made – 2 (2025 Women's PGA – 2025 Evian)
- Longest streak of top-10s – 1 (once)

== LPGA Tour career summary ==
Year	Tournaments played	Cuts made*	Wins	2nd	3rd	Top 10s	Best finish	Earnings ($)	Money list rank	Scoring average	Scoring rank
2021	2	1	0	0	0	0	T57	n/a	n/a	72.67	n/a
2022	3	2	0	0	0	0	T24	n/a	n/a	71.10	n/a
2023	21	12	1	0	0	1	1	387,585	73	71.24	58
2024	29	22	1	0	2	4	1	1,002,989	34	71.43	59
2025	24	18	0	1	0	3	T2	1,423,567	25	71.51	72
Totals^	74 (2023)	52	2	1	2	8	1	2,814,141	174		

^Official as of 2025 season
*Includes matchplay and other tournaments without a cut.

== World ranking ==
Position in Women's World Golf Rankings at the end of each calendar year.

Year	World ranking	Source
2021	1,134	
2022	363	
2023	43	
2024	46	
2025	54	

== Team appearances ==
Amateur

- Queen Sirikit Cup (representing Thailand): 2019

Professional

- International Crown (representing Thailand): 2025
