= Arpichaya Yubol =

Thai professional golfer (born 2002)

Personal information
- Nickname: Piano
- Nationality: Thailand
- Born: 3 May 2002 (age 24) Saraburi, Thailand

Career
- Sport: Golf
- Turned professional: 2017
- Current tours: Thai LPGA Tour; LPGA Tour (joined 2023)
- Former tour: LET Access Series
- Professional wins: 14

Best results in LPGA major championships
- Chevron Championship: CUT: 2023, 2025
- Women's PGA C'ship: T45: 2025
- U.S. Women's Open: 5th: 2024
- Women's British Open: T36: 2026
- Evian Championship: T41: 2026

Achievements and awards
- Thai LPGA Tour Order of Merit: 2018
Medal record
Women's golf
Representing Thailand
Asian Games
Gold medal – first place	2022 Hangzhou	Individual
Gold medal – first place	2022 Hangzhou	Team

Arpichaya Yubol (Thai: อาภิชญา ยุบล; born 3 May 2002) is a Thai professional golfer who plays on the LPGA Tour.

Yubol turned professional in 2017 and became one of the leading players on the Thai LPGA Tour the following year, winning five consecutive events and the season-long Order of Merit at the age of 16. She later won on the LET Access Series at the 2022 Trust Golf Links Series - Musselburgh and represented Thailand at the 2022 Asian Games in Hangzhou, where she won gold medals in the individual and team events. Her best finish in a major championship is a tie for fifth at the 2024 U.S. Women's Open. On the LPGA Tour, her best results are runner-up finishes at the Riviera Maya Open and ShopRite LPGA Classic in 2026.

== Early life ==
Yubol was born on 3 May 2002 in Saraburi, Thailand.

== Professional career ==
Yubol began her professional golf career in 2017 at age 15, achieving early success on the Thai LPGA Tour in 2018 by winning five consecutive titles, which led to her securing the season-long Order of Merit at just 16 years old.

In 2022, Yubol continued her ascent by winning decisively at the Trust Golf Links Series at Musselburgh Golf Club on the LET Access Series with a five-stroke margin. Later that year, she successfully passed the LPGA Qualifying School, earning her place on the LPGA Tour for the 2023 season.

At the 2022 Asian Games in Hangzhou, Yubol achieved notable success, winning two gold medals for Thailand in both the Individual and Team competitions, alongside teammates Eila Galitsky and Patcharajutar Kongkraphan. Her victory in the individual event was unexpected, as the previously dominant Indian golfer Aditi Ashok faced challenges in the final round. Yubol's consistent performance throughout the tournament underscored her emerging prominence in international golf.

The 2024 U.S. Women's Open represented a significant achievement for Yubol, as she achieved her highest LPGA Tour finish to date, tying for fifth place despite starting the tournament ranked 245th in the world. In May 2026, Yubol achieved her career-best finish on the LPGA Tour by securing solo second place at the Riviera Maya Open in Mexico, finishing four strokes behind Nelly Korda. Later that month, she recorded her second runner-up finish of the 2026 season at the ShopRite LPGA Classic, closing with a five-under-par 66 to finish alone in second place, one stroke behind Céline Boutier. During the second round, she was assessed a one-stroke slow-play penalty, with her Saturday score changed from 73 to 74.

== Amateur wins ==
- 2017 Singapore Junior Championship

== Professional wins (14) ==
=== LET Access Series wins (1) ===
No.	Date	Tournament	Winning score	Margin of victory	Runners-up
1	16 Jul 2022	Trust Golf Links Series - Musselburgh	−10 (71-68-67=206)	5 strokes	(Netherlands) Lauren Holmey (a), (Germany) Patricia Isabel Schmidt

=== Taiwan LPGA Tour wins (1) ===
- 2019 (1) ICTSI Manila Golf Ladies Masters

=== Thai LPGA Tour wins (9) ===
- 2018 (5) 4th Singha-SAT Thai LPGA Championship, 5th Singha-SAT Thai LPGA Championship, 6th Singha-SAT Thai LPGA Championship, 7th Singha-SAT Thai LPGA Championship, 8th Singha-SAT Thai LPGA Championship
- 2019 (1) 3rd Singha-SAT Thai LPGA Championship
- 2021 (2) Singha-BGC 7th Thai LPGA Championship, Singha-BGC 8th Thai LPGA Championship
- 2023 (1) Singha Pattaya Ladies Open

=== Other wins (3) ===
- 2021 (1) Thailand Mixed #1
- 2022 (2) 8th SAT-TWT Open Road to World Ranking, Thailand Mixed #5

== Results in LPGA majors ==
Tournament	2023	2024	2025	2026
Chevron Championship	CUT		CUT	
U.S. Women's Open		5	CUT	
Women's PGA Championship	CUT	T46	T45	CUT
The Evian Championship		67	CUT	T41
Women's British Open	CUT	T49	T58	T36

Top 10
Did not play

CUT = missed the half-way cut
"T" = tied

== LPGA Tour career summary ==
Year	Tournaments played	Cuts made*	Wins	2nd	3rd	Top 10s	Best finish	Earnings ($)	Money list rank	Scoring average	Scoring rank
2023	17	10	0	0	0	0	T13	170,127	107	71.56	77
2024	28	20	0	0	0	4	T4	1,063,203	33	71.29	53
2025	24	15	0	0	0	1	T9	310,348	86	72.12	107
Totals^	69	45	0	0	0	5	T4	1,543,678	260		

^Official as of 2025 season
*Includes matchplay and other tournaments without a cut.

== World ranking ==
Position in Women's World Golf Rankings at the end of each calendar year.

Year	World ranking	Source
2017	1,092	
2018	696	
2019	364	
2022	479	
2023	211	
2024	87	
2025	149	

== Team appearances ==
- Asian Games (representing Thailand): 2022 (winners)
