= Sherman Santiwiwatthanaphong =

Thai professional golfer

Personal information
- Nickname: Champagne
- Nationality: Thailand
- Born: 9 November 1996 (age 29) Nong Khai (modern-day Bueng Kan), Thailand
- Height: 5 ft 4 in (163 cm)

Career
- Sport: Golf
- Turned professional: 2014
- Current tour: Epson Tour
- Former tour: LPGA Tour
- Professional wins: 9

Number of wins by tour
- Ladies Asian Golf Tour: 1
- Epson Tour: 2
- Other: 6

Best results in LPGA major championships
- Chevron Championship: DNP
- Women's PGA C'ship: CUT: 2017, 2018
- U.S. Women's Open: DNP
- Women's British Open: CUT: 2018
- Evian Championship: 71st: 2018

Sherman Santiwiwatthanaphong (Thai: เฌอมาลย์ สันติวิวัฒนพงศ์; born 9 November 1996) is a Thai professional golfer playing on the Epson Tour.

== Early life and amateur career ==
Santiwiwatthanaphong started playing golf at the age of 13. She enjoys watching movies. She is also known by her nickname, "Champagne".

In 2013, Santiwiwatthanaphong secured her first professional win on her 17th birthday when she won the PTT Global Chemical Thailand Ladies Open on the Ladies Asian Golf Tour as an amateur.

== Professional career ==
Santiwiwatthanaphong turned professional in 2014. In 2015, she played 14 events in her rookie year on the Symetra Tour. She recorded four top-10 finishes including her maiden win at the season-ending Symetra Tour Championship.

In 2016, Santiwiwatthanaphong mainly played on the Symetra Tour which she made 17 cuts from 19 starts with seven top-ten finishes. She claimed her second Symetra Tour title at the Island Resort Championship and finished sixth on the money list to earn LPGA membership for the 2017 season.

In 2017, Santiwiwatthanaphong played in 21 LPGA Tour events and recorded a season-best at the Thornberry Creek LPGA Classic with a tied for 11th place.

In 2018, Santiwiwatthanaphong made ten cuts from 21 starts on the LPGA Tour, including her career-best at the Kingsmill Championship that she finished tied for seventh. She also made the cut at the 2018 Evian Championship and finished 71st.

In 2019, Santiwiwatthanaphong played 18 tournaments on the LPGA Tour and made three cuts. She shotted her career-best round of 8-under 63 in the first round at the Walmart NW Arkansas Championship.

== Amateur wins ==
this list may be incomplete

- 2013 Thailand Ladies Amateur

== Professional wins (9) ==
=== Ladies Asian Golf Tour wins (1) ===
No.	Date	Tournament	Winning score	To par	Margin of victory	Runners-up
1	9 Nov 2013	PTT Global Chemical Thailand Ladies Open (as an amateur)	70-75-68=213	−3	1 stroke	(Thailand) Pornanong Phatlum, (Thailand) Ornnicha Kosunthea (a)

=== Symetra Tour wins (2) ===
- 2015 (1) Symetra Tour Championship
- 2016 (1) Island Resort Championship

=== All Thailand Golf Tour wins (1) ===
- 2013 (1) Singha Classic (as an amateur)

=== Thai LPGA Tour wins (3) ===
- 2014 (1) 8th Singha-SAT Thai LPGA Championship
- 2021 (2) BGC 3rd Thai LPGA Championship, BGC-Betagro 5th Thai LPGA Championship

=== China LPGA Tour wins (1) ===
- 2023 (1) Mitsubishi Heavy Industries Championship

=== Taiwan LPGA Tour wins (1) ===
- 2026 (1) CTBC Ladies Open^{1}

^{1}Co-sanctioned by the JLPGA Step Up Tour

== Results in LPGA majors ==
Results not in chronological order.

Tournament	2017	2018
The Chevron Championship		
U.S. Women's Open		
Women's PGA Championship	CUT	CUT
The Evian Championship	CUT	71
Women's British Open		CUT

Did not play

CUT = missed the half-way cut

== Team appearances ==
Amateur

- Queen Sirikit Cup (representing Thailand): 2014

Professional

- International Crown (representing Thailand): 2018
