= Chonlada Chayanun =

Thai professional golfer

Personal information
- Nationality: Thailand
- Born: 5 December 1992 (age 33) Nakhon Ratchasima, Thailand
- Height: 163 cm (5 ft 4 in)

Career
- Sport: Golf
- College: Iowa State University
- Turned professional: 2015
- Current tours: China LPGA Tour; Taiwan LPGA Tour; Thai LPGA Tour
- Former tour: Epson Tour
- Professional wins: 6

Achievements and awards
- Thai LPGA Tour Order of Merit: 2019

Chonlada Chayanun (Thai: ชลดา ชยณรรย์; born 5 December 1992) is a Thai professional golfer. She played college golf at Iowa State University, where she was a two-time First-Team All-Big 12 selection and tied for seventh at the 2014 NCAA Championship.

Chayanun has won six individual professional events across the China LPGA Tour, Taiwan LPGA Tour and Thai LPGA Tour. She was also part of Team Hillier, which won the team competition at the 2022 Aramco Team Series – Bangkok.

== Amateur career ==
Chayanun attended Iowa State University and played for the Iowa State Cyclones women's golf team. In the 2014–15 season, she played in all 11 tournaments, led the team with a 73.38 stroke average, recorded four top-10 finishes and was named First-Team All-Big 12 and First-Team Academic All-Big 12.

At the 2014 NCAA Championship, Chayanun tied for seventh after rounds of 72-69-69-72. Iowa State described the result as the best NCAA postseason finish by a player in the program's history at the time. She was also named Iowa State Female Athlete of the Year and was listed by Iowa State as holding school records including season stroke average, career stroke average, 54-hole score and 18-hole score.

== Professional career ==
Chayanun turned professional in 2015. In March 2018, she won her first professional victory at the Hengqin Phoenix Tree Building Orient Golf Challenge on the China LPGA Tour. She finished at 211, five-under-par, after rounds of 70, 72 and 69, and won in a playoff at Phoenix Tree Orient Golf Club in Zhuhai, Guangdong.

In September 2018, she won the CTBC Ladies Open on the Taiwan LPGA Tour at Tong Hwa Golf & Country Club in Taiwan. She finished at 209, seven-under-par, one stroke ahead of Vivian Hou and Hana Wakimoto.

Chayanun won twice on the Thai LPGA Tourin 2019. In April, she won the 4th Singha-SAT Thai LPGA Championship at Rancho Charnvee Resort & Country Club in Nakhon Ratchasima, finishing four strokes ahead of Chorphaka Jaengkit. In August, she won the 8th Singha-SAT Thai LPGA Championship at Watermill Golf Club and Resort in Nakhon Nayok with a score of 205, 11-under-par. The victory moved her to the top of the Thai LPGA Tour Order of Merit for the 2019 season.

In November 2021, Chayanun won the BGC-Betagro Thai LPGA Super Six Match Play at Royal Hua Hin Golf Club in Prachuap Khiri Khan, defeating Yupaporn Kawinpakorn 1 up in the final.

In May 2022, Chayanun was part of Team Hillier, captained by Whitney Hillier, which won the team competition at the Aramco Team Series – Bangkok. The team finished at 31-under-par, three strokes ahead of Team Simmermacher.

In September 2023, Chayanun won the Kenda Tire TLPGA Open on the Taiwan LPGA Tour at Taifong Golf Club. She finished at 209, seven-under-par, two strokes ahead of Huang Ching and Chen Tzu-han.

== Professional wins (6) ==
=== China LPGA Tour wins (1) ===
No.	Date	Tournament	Winning score	To par	Margin of victory	Runner(s)-up	Ref.
1	24 Mar 2018	Hengqin Phoenix Tree Building Orient Golf Challenge	70-72-69=211	−5	Playoff	(China) Ying Luo, (Thailand) Wanchana Poruangrong, (South Korea) Seo Ji-hyun, (China) Xiang Sui	

=== Taiwan LPGA Tour wins (2) ===
No.	Date	Tournament	Winning score	To par	Margin of victory	Runner(s)-up	Ref.
1	1 Sep 2018	CTBC Ladies Open	70-71-68=209	−7	1 stroke	(Taiwan) Vivian Hou (a), (Japan) Hana Wakimoto	
2	22 Sep 2023	Kenda Tire TLPGA Open	69-69-71=209	−7	2 strokes	(Taiwan) Chen Tzu-han, (Taiwan) Huang Ching	

=== Thai LPGA Tour wins (3) ===
No.	Date	Tournament	Winning score	To par	Margin of victory	Runner(s)-up	Ref.
1	26 Apr 2019	4th Singha-SAT Thai LPGA Championship	68-66-69=203	−13	4 strokes	(Thailand) Chorphaka Jaengkit	
2	9 Aug 2019	8th Singha-SAT Thai LPGA Championship	65-71-69=205	−11	1 stroke	(Thailand) Panchalika Arphamongkol (a), (Thailand) Patcharajutar Kongkraphan, (Thailand) Onkanok Soisuwan	
3	12 Nov 2021	BGC-Betagro Thai LPGA Super Six Match Play	1 up			(Thailand) Yupaporn Kawinpakorn	
