= 2009 IIHF World U18 Championships =

2009 IIHF World U18 Championship

Tournament details
- Host country: United States
- Venues: 2 (in 2 host cities)
- Dates: April 9–19, 2009
- Teams: 10

Final positions
- Champions: United States (4th title)
- Runners-up: Russia
- Third place: Finland
- Fourth place: Canada

Tournament statistics
- Games played: 31
- Goals scored: 252 (8.13 per game)
- Attendance: 44,779 (1,444 per game)
- Scoring leader: (Finland) Toni Rajala (19 points)

The 2009 IIHF World U18 Championships were held in Fargo, North Dakota and Moorhead, Minnesota, United States. The championships ran from April 9 to April 19, 2009. Games were played at the Urban Plains Center in Fargo and the Moorhead Sports Center in Moorhead. Fargo-Moorhead defeated Providence, Rhode Island and St. Cloud, Minnesota for the rights to host the event.

The United States, as the host country, won their third gold medal in five years, defeating Russia 5–0 in the final. Finland rounded out the podium with a 5–4 shootout win over Canada in the bronze medal game.

== Top Division ==
=== Preliminary round ===
==== Group A ====
Pos	Team	Pld	W	OTW	OTL	L	GF	GA	GD	Pts	Qualification
1	Canada	4	3	1	0	0	27	8	+19	11	Semifinals
2	Sweden	4	3	0	0	1	25	8	+17	9	Quarterfinals
3	Czech Republic	4	1	0	1	2	12	17	−5	4	Quarterfinals
4	Switzerland	4	1	0	0	3	11	28	−17	3	Relegation round
5	Germany	4	1	0	0	3	13	27	−14	3	Relegation round

Source: IIHF

April 9, 2009; 16:00	Czech Republic	0–7 (0–3, 0–3, 0–1)	Sweden	Moorhead Sports Center – Moorhead, Minnesota; Attendance: 136

Game reference

Filip Novotný
Marek Mazanec
Goalies
Robin Lehner
Referees:
(Norway) Owe Luthcke
(United States) Travis Smith
Linesmen:
(United States) Johnathan Morrison
(Finland) Sakari Suominen

0–1	9:19 – Järnkrok (Erixon, Lander)
0–2	12:15 – Josefson (Pääjärvi, Ekman-Larsson) (SH)
0–3	19:14 – Pääjärvi (Klingberg, Josefson)
0–4	21:29 – Erixon (Järnkrok)
0–5	31:12 – Pääjärvi (Josefson, Ekman-Larsson) (PP)
0–6	39:11 – Styrman (Järnkrok) (PP)
0-7	47:11 – Klingberg (Bertilsson, Josefson) (PP)

24 min
Penalties
34 min
20
Shots
51

April 9, 2009; 16:30	Germany	2–11 (1–1, 0–7, 1–3)	Canada	Urban Plains Center – Fargo, North Dakota; Attendance: 1389

Game reference

Dustin Haloschan
Lukas Steinhauer
Goalies
Michael Zador
Referees:
(Czech Republic) Martin Franco
(Slovakia) Jozef Kubuš
Linesmen:
(United States) Paul Carnathan
(Slovakia) Miroslav Valach

	0–1	9:55 – Froese (Elliott, Després) (PP)
Plachta (El-Sayed) (PP) – 9:55	1–1
	1–2	21:49 – McFarland (Gudbranson)
	1–3	22:37 – Froese (Hamilton)
	1–4	26:59 – Werek (Gudbranson, Kassian) (PP)
	1–5	31:44 – Ferraro (Hishon)
	1–6	34:10 – Werek (O'Reilly, Kassian)
	1–7	35:05 – Eakin (Mitchell, de Haan)
	1–8	39:07 – Froese (Hamilton)
Ohmann (Huefner, Brandl) (PP) – 41:40	2–8
	2–9	45:27 – Connolly (Hamilton)
	2–10	49:43 – Eakin (Kassain, Werek)
	2–11	54:06 – Hamilton (Froese) (PP)

10 min
Penalties
6 min
20
Shots
37

April 10, 2009; 19:30	Switzerland	2–6 (0–1, 2–4, 0–1)	Czech Republic	Moorhead Sports Center; Attendance: 623

Game reference

Benjamin Conz
Goalies
Marek Mazanec
Referees:
(United States) Keith Kaval
(Finland) Aleksi Rantala
Linesmen:
(Japan) Shinichi Takizawa
(Sweden) Fredrik Ulriksson

	0–1	05:26 – Honejsek (Culek)
Haas (Loeffel, Schäppi (PP) – 23:56	1–1
	1–2	26:19 – Jeřábek (Hlinka) (SH)
	1–3	35:29 – Polášek (Hlinka)
Scherwey (Niederreiter) (PP) – 27:24	2–3
	2–4	37:45 – Rachůnek (PP)
	2–5	38:16 – Heřman (Růžička) (PP)
	2–6	42:25 – Horák (Jeřábek)

6 min
Penalties
24 min
29
Shots
38

April 11, 2009; 16:00	Sweden	5–4 (2–1, 2–1, 1–2)	Germany	Moorhead Sports Center; Attendance: 196

Game reference

Robin Lehner
Goalies
Lukas Steinhauer
Referees:
(Czech Republic) Milan Minář
(Switzerland) Daniel Stricker
Linesmen:
(Czech Republic) Jaromír Bláha
(Japan) Shinichi Takizawa

	0–1	04:20 – El-Sayed (Steinhauer)
Järnkrok (Erixon, Lander) (PP) – 08:17	1–1
Lander (Järnkrok, Erixon) – 19:40	2–1
Cehlin (Pääjärvi) – 21:38	3–1
	3–2	26:51 – Kühnhackl (Plachta) (SH)
Landeskog (Lander, Erixon) – 29:48	4–2
Pääjärvi (Ekman-Larsson) – 44:27	5–2
	5–3	47:36 – Steinhauer (Hauner) (PP)
	5–4	50:16 – El-Sayed (Hauner, Plachta) (PP)

55 min
Penalties
20 min
50
Shots
37

April 11, 2009; 16:00	Canada	8–1 (2–1, 3–0, 3–0)	Switzerland	Urban Plains Center; Attendance: 1,516

Game reference

April 12, 2009; 17:00	Germany	4–3 (2–0, 1–1, 1–2)	Czech Republic	Moorhead Sports Center; Attendance: 156

Game reference

April 13, 2009; 16:00	Sweden	11–0 (3–0, 5–0, 3–0)	Switzerland	Moorhead Sports Center; Attendance: 151

Game reference

April 13, 2009; 16:00	Czech Republic	3–4 OT (1–0, 2–0, 0–3) (0–1)	Canada	Urban Plains Center; Attendance: 1,307

Game reference

April 14, 2009; 16:00	Switzerland	8–3 (1–0, 4–2, 3–1)	Germany	Moorhead Sports Center; Attendance: 99

Game reference

April 14, 2009; 16:00	Canada	4–2 (2–0, 1–2, 1–0)	Sweden	Urban Plains Center; Attendance: 1,543

Game reference

Michael Zador
Goalies
Robin Lehner
Referees:
(United States) Keith Kaval
(United States) Travis Smith
Linesmen:
(Germany) Andreas Kowert
(United States) Johnathan Morrison

Froese (Connolly, Hamilton) – 17:13	1–0
Hishon (McFarland) – 17:49	2–0
	2–1	23:30 – Landeskog (Wallén, Erixon) (PP)
Hishon (Holland, McFarland) – 25:00	3–1
	3–2	31:40 – Erixon (Järnkrok, Wallén) (PP)
Connolly (de Haan) (ENG) – 59:44	4–2

12 min
Penalties
12 min
43
Shots
38

==== Group B ====
Pos	Team	Pld	W	OTW	OTL	L	GF	GA	GD	Pts	Qualification
1	Finland	4	3	0	0	1	27	9	+18	9	Semifinals
2	United States	4	3	0	0	1	29	9	+20	9	Quarterfinals
3	Russia	4	3	0	0	1	25	15	+10	9	Quarterfinals
4	Slovakia	4	1	0	0	3	7	28	−21	3	Relegation round
5	Norway	4	0	0	0	4	4	31	−27	0	Relegation round

Source: IIHF

April 9, 2009; 19:30	Finland	7–4 (2–2, 4–2, 1–0)	Russia	Moorhead Sports Center; Attendance: 271

Game reference

Joni Ortio
Goalies
Igor Bobkov
Referees:
(Canada) Darcy Burchell
(Switzerland) Daniel Stricker
Linesmen:
(Canada) Matt MacPherson
(Sweden) Fredrik Ulriksson

	0–1	8:34 – Burmistrov (Kitsyn, Kuznetsov)
	0–2	15:08 – Tarasenko (Kabanov, Chvanov)
Haula (Kumpulainen) – 16:27	1–2
Pulkkinen (Vatanen, Rajala) (PP) – 19:10	2–2
Pulkkinen (Rajala, Granlund) (PP) – 21:32	3–2
Nättinen (Pakarinen) – 23:41	4–2
Rajala (Kivistö) – 26:08	5–2
	5–3	27:16 – Kabanov (Tarasenko)
Aaltonen (Vatanen, Granlund) (PP) – 31:53	6–3
	6–4	32:42 – Tarasenko (Chvanov, Kabanov)
Rajala (Granlund, Aaltonen) (PP) – 45:30	7–4

12 min
Penalties
34 min
41
Shots
34

April 9, 2009; 20:00	Norway	0–8 (0–2, 0–3, 0–3)	United States	Urban Plains Center; Attendance: 2,678

Game reference

Lars Volden
Goalies
Adam Murray
Jack Campbell
Referees:
(Slovakia) Daniel Konc
(Czech Republic) Milan Minar
Linesmen:
(Czech Republic) Jaromír Bláha
(Russia) Alexei Medvedev

0–1	08:32 – Ryan (Bourque, Mattson)
0–2	12:21 – Treais (Bourque)
0–3	36:21 – Nieto (Fowler) (PP)
0–4	38:40 – Lynch (Morin)
0–5	39:13 – D'Amigo (Morin, Lynch)
0–6	47:08 – Lynch (D'Amigo)
0–7	47:53 – Zucker (Brown)
0–8	48:50 – Morin (Fowler) (PP)

28 min
Penalties
12 min
16
Shots
65

April 10, 2009; 19:30	Slovakia	5–2 (0–0, 3–0, 2–2)	Norway	Urban Plains Center; Attendance: 2,999

Game reference

April 11, 2009; 19:30	Russia	7–2 (1–0, 4–1, 2–1)	Slovakia	Moorhead Sports Center; Attendance: 249

Game reference

April 11, 2009; 19:30	United States	4–3 (2–0, 2–0, 0–3)	Finland	Urban Plains Center; Attendance: 3,166

Game reference

April 12, 2009; 17:00	Norway	1–8 (0–4, 0–1, 1–3)	Russia	Urban Plains Center; Attendance: 1,594

Game reference

April 13, 2009; 19:30	Finland	10–1 (3–0, 6–1, 1–0)	Norway	Moorhead Sports Center; Attendance: 154

Game reference

April 13, 2009; 19:30	United States	12–0 (3–0, 4–0, 5–0)	Slovakia	Urban Plains Center; Attendance: 2,040

Game reference

April 14, 2009; 19:30	Slovakia	0–7 (0–3, 0–2, 0–2)	Finland	Moorhead Sports Center; Attendance: 137

Game reference

April 14, 2009; 19:30	Russia	6–5 (0–2, 3–1, 3–2)	United States	Urban Plains Center; Attendance: 3,584

Game reference

=== Relegation round ===
Pos	Team	Pld	W	OTW	OTL	L	GF	GA	GD	Pts	Qualification
1	Slovakia	3	2	0	1	0	13	9	+4	7	
2	Switzerland	3	2	0	0	1	17	10	+7	6	
3	Norway	3	1	0	0	2	10	14	−4	3	Relegated to the 2010 Division I
4	Germany	3	0	1	0	2	10	17	−7	2	Relegated to the 2010 Division I

Source: IIHF

==== Results ====
Note: The following matches from the preliminary round carry forward to the relegation round:

- April 10, 2009: Slovakia 5-2 Norway
- April 14, 2009: Switzerland 8–3 Germany

April 16, 2009; 19:30	Switzerland	7–3 (3–1, 4–1, 0–1)	Norway	Moorhead Sports Center; Attendance: 94

Game reference

April 17, 2009; 19:30	Slovakia	4–5 GWS (0–2, 1–2, 3–0) (0–0, 0–1)	Germany	Moorhead Sports Center; Attendance: 93

Game reference

April 18, 2009; 16:00	Switzerland	2–4 (0–0, 2–2, 0–2)	Slovakia	Moorhead Sports Center; Attendance: 82

Game reference

April 18, 2009; 19:30	Germany	2–5 (1–1, 0–2, 1–2)	Norway	Moorhead Sports Center; Attendance: 105

Game reference

=== Final round ===
Quarterfinals
A2	Sweden	1
B3	Russia	4
B2	United States	6
A3	Czech Republic	2

Semifinals
B1	Finland	0
B3	Russia	4
A1	Canada	1
B2	United States	2
5th place match
A2	Sweden	4
A3	Czech Republic	2

Final
B2	United States	5
B3	Russia	0
3rd place match
A1	Canada	4
B1	Finland (GWS)	5

==== Quarterfinals ====
April 16, 2009; 16:00	Sweden	1–4 (1–0, 0–2, 0–2)	Russia	Urban Plains Center; Attendance: 1,456

Game reference

Robin Lehner
Goalies
Igor Bobkov
Referees:
(Slovakia) Daniel Konc
(Czech Republic) Milan Minar
Linesmen:
(Czech Republic) Jaromír Bláha
(United States) Jonathan Morrison

Josefson (Ekman-Larsson, Wallén) – 16:31	1–0
	1–1	25:09 – Orlov (Zaitsev, Burmistrov) (PP)
	1–2	39:15 – Kabanov (Tarasenko)
	1–3	43:19 – Burmistrov (Kuznetsov) (SH)
	1–4	51:50 – Kuznetsov (PS)

16 min
Penalties
16 min
45
Shots
31

April 16, 2009; 19:30	United States	6–2 (2–1, 4–0, 0–1)	Czech Republic	Urban Plains Center; Attendance: 2,049

Game reference

==== Semifinals ====
April 17, 2009; 16:00	Finland	0–4 (0–0, 0–2, 0–2)	Russia	Urban Plains Center; Attendance: 1,551

Game reference

April 17, 2009; 19:30	Canada	1–2 (0–0, 1–0, 0–2)	United States	Urban Plains Center; Attendance: 4,906

Game reference

==== Fifth place game ====
April 18, 2009; 19:30	Sweden	4–2 (0–1, 3–0, 1–1)	Czech Republic	Urban Plains Center; Attendance: 1,672

Game reference

==== Bronze medal game ====
April 19, 2009; 15:00	Canada	4–5 GWS (3–1, 1–1, 0–2) (0–0, 0–1)	Finland	Urban Plains Center; Attendance: 3,860

Game reference

==== Gold medal game ====
April 19, 2009; 19:00	United States	5–0 (2–0, 1–0, 2–0)	Russia	Urban Plains Center; Attendance: 4,923

Game reference

=== Final standings ===
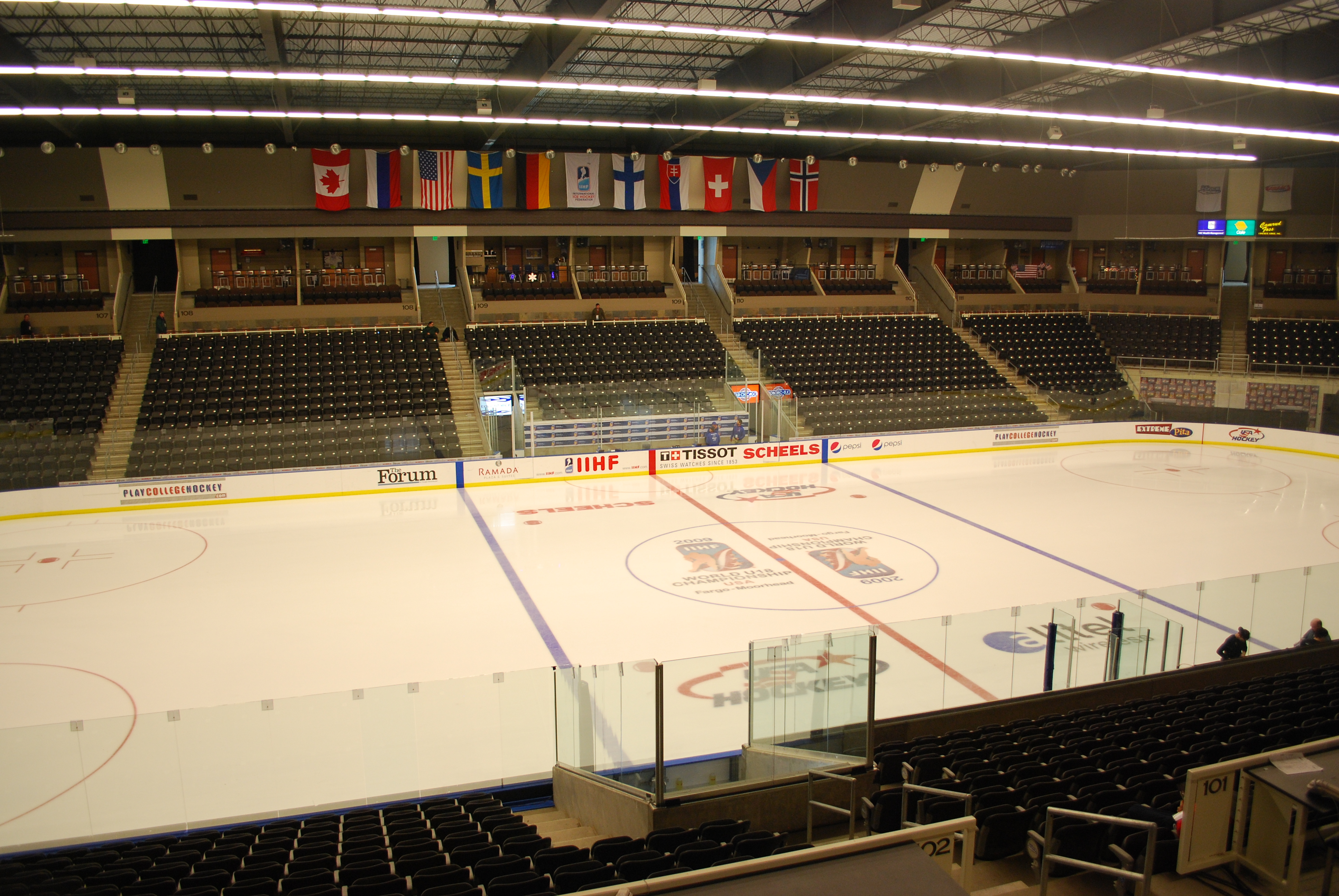
Urban Plains Center

Rk.	Team
1st place, gold medalist(s)	United States
2nd place, silver medalist(s)	Russia
3rd place, bronze medalist(s)	Finland
4	Canada
5	Sweden
6	Czech Republic
7	Slovakia
8	Switzerland
9	Norway
10	Germany

Norway and Germany are relegated to Division I for the 2010 IIHF World U18 Championships.

=== Leading scorers ===
Player	Country	GP	G	A	Pts	+/-	PIM
Toni Rajala	Finland	6	10	9	19	+10	6
Vladimir Tarasenko	Russia	7	8	7	15	+7	6
Teemu Pulkkinen	Finland	6	7	6	13	+9	4
Yevgeni Kuznetsov	Russia	7	6	7	13	+7	10
Jerry D'Amigo	United States	7	4	9	13	+5	8
Mikael Granlund	Finland	6	2	11	13	+9	0
Magnus Paajarvi Svensson	Sweden	6	6	6	12	+6	0
Alexander Burmistrov	Russia	7	4	7	11	+7	6
Kirill Kabanov	Russia	7	4	7	11	+5	18
Jeremy Morin	United States	7	6	4	10	+6	8

=== Top goaltenders ===
Player	Country	GP	Min	GAA	SV%	SO
Jack Campbell	United States	5	240:58	0.75	.967	2
Michael Zador	Canada	6	371:10	2.42	.931	0
Igor Bobkov	Russia	6	360:00	3.33	.927	1
Robin Lehner	Sweden	4	235:42	2.80	.916	1
Joni Ortio	Finland	5	308:55	2.91	.903	1

== Division I ==
=== Group A ===
The tournament was played in Minsk, Belarus between April 6 and April 12, 2009.

Pos	Team	Pld	W	OTW	OTL	L	GF	GA	GD	Pts	Promotion or relegation
1	Belarus	5	4	1	0	0	23	6	+17	14	Promoted to the 2010 Top Division
2	Poland	5	2	2	0	1	25	13	+12	10	
3	Hungary	5	3	0	1	1	19	18	+1	10	
4	Kazakhstan	5	2	0	1	2	16	21	−5	7	
5	Lithuania	5	1	0	1	3	13	16	−3	4	
6	Ukraine	5	0	0	0	5	7	29	−22	0	Relegated to the 2010 Division II

Source: IIHF

=== Group B ===
The tournament was played in Asiago, Italy between March 29 and April 5, 2009.

Pos	Team	Pld	W	OTW	OTL	L	GF	GA	GD	Pts	Promotion or relegation
1	Latvia	5	4	0	0	1	18	10	+8	12	Promoted to the 2010 Top Division
2	Denmark	5	3	0	1	1	15	7	+8	10	
3	Austria	5	2	2	0	1	21	20	+1	10	
4	France	5	1	1	1	2	15	17	−2	6	
5	Japan	5	0	2	1	2	13	16	−3	5	
6	Italy	5	0	0	2	3	8	20	−12	2	Relegated to the 2010 Division II

Source: IIHF

== Division II ==
=== Group A ===
The tournament was played in Maribor, Slovenia between March 22 and March 28, 2009.

Pos	Team	Pld	W	OTW	OTL	L	GF	GA	GD	Pts	Promotion or relegation
1	South Korea	5	5	0	0	0	30	4	+26	15	Promoted to the 2010 Division I
2	Slovenia	5	4	0	0	1	42	5	+37	12	
3	Romania	5	3	0	0	2	23	20	+3	9	
4	Croatia	5	2	0	0	3	23	27	−4	6	
5	Spain	5	1	0	0	4	12	27	−15	3	
6	Mexico	5	0	0	0	5	3	50	−47	0	Relegated to the 2010 Division III

Source: IIHF

=== Group B ===
The tournament was played in Narva, Estonia between March 16 and March 22, 2009.

Pos	Team	Pld	W	OTW	OTL	L	GF	GA	GD	Pts	Promotion or relegation
1	Great Britain	5	5	0	0	0	46	11	+35	15	Promoted to the 2010 Division I
2	Estonia	5	3	1	0	1	22	14	+8	11	
3	Belgium	5	1	2	1	1	23	19	+4	8	
4	Netherlands	5	2	0	1	2	34	22	+12	7	
5	Serbia	5	1	0	1	3	16	35	−19	4	
6	China	5	0	0	0	5	9	49	−40	0	Relegated to the 2010 Division III

Source: IIHF

== Division III ==
=== Group A ===
The tournament was played in Taipei, Taiwan (Republic of China) between February 27 and March 5, 2009.

Pos	Team	Pld	W	OTW	OTL	L	GF	GA	GD	Pts	Promotion
1	Australia	4	4	0	0	0	63	3	+60	12	Promoted to the 2010 Division II
2	New Zealand	4	3	0	0	1	28	12	+16	9	
3	Chinese Taipei	4	2	0	0	2	28	14	+14	6	
4	South Africa	4	1	0	0	3	19	32	−13	3	
5	Mongolia	4	0	0	0	4	4	81	−77	0	

Source: IIHF

=== Group B ===
The tournament was played in Erzurum, Turkey between March 9 and March 15, 2009.

Position	Team	Promotion
1	Iceland	Promoted to the 2010 IIHF World U18 Championship Division II
2	Turkey	
3	Ireland	
4	Bulgaria	

== See also ==
- List of sporting events in Taiwan

== See also ==
- 2009 IIHF World U18 Championship Division I
- 2009 IIHF World U18 Championship Division II
- 2009 IIHF World U18 Championship Division III
- 2009 World Junior Ice Hockey Championships
- 2009 World U-17 Hockey Challenge
