= 2009 IIHF World U18 Championship Division III =

Ice hockey competition

Tournament details
- Host countries: Taiwan; Turkey
- Venues: 2 (in 2 host cities)
- Dates: 27 February – 5 March 2009; 9–15 March 2009
- Teams: 9

The 2009 IIHF World U18 Championship Division III was an international under-18 ice hockey competition organised by the International Ice Hockey Federation. Both Division III tournaments made up the fourth level of competition of the 2009 IIHF World U18 Championships. The Group A tournament took place between 27 February and 5 March 2009 in Taipei, Taiwan and the Group B tournament took place between 9 and 15 March 2009 in Erzurum, Turkey. Australia and Iceland won the Group A and B tournaments respectively and gained promotion to Division II of the 2010 IIHF World U18 Championships.

== Group A ==
The Group A tournament was played in Taipei, Taiwan at Annex Ice Rink from 27 February to 5 March 2009.

=== Final standings ===
Pos	Team	Pld	W	OTW	OTL	L	GF	GA	GD	Pts	Promotion
1	Australia	4	4	0	0	0	63	3	+60	12	Promoted to the 2010 Division II
2	New Zealand	4	3	0	0	1	28	12	+16	9	
3	Chinese Taipei	4	2	0	0	2	28	14	+14	6	
4	South Africa	4	1	0	0	3	19	32	−13	3	
5	Mongolia	4	0	0	0	4	4	81	−77	0	

Source: IIHF

=== Results ===
All times are local.

February 27, 2009; 16:00	New Zealand	0–7	Australia	Annex Ice Rink; Attendance: 250

	Referee: R van Gameren (Germany)
Goals / W Darge (PP) 04:52; B Cliff (PP) 06:50; S Best (PP) 10:10; W Darge (EQ) 20:24; E Sewell (EQ) 30:57; R Outred (EQ) 42:59; B Cliff (PP) 55:00	Referee: R van Gameren (Germany)

February 27, 2009; 19:00	Chinese Taipei	17–0	Mongolia	Annex Ice Rink; Attendance: 730

	Referee: Park GJ (South Korea)
Juan KF (EQ) 06:04; Weng T (EQ) 06:33; Yeh CY (EQ) 09:20; Shih KY (EQ) 15:44; Weng T (PP) 19:32; Weng T (SH) 26:44; Liu YL (EQ) 29:11; Yang CH (EQ) 32:36; Shen YL (EQ) 32:45; Juan KF (PP) 39:13; Juan KF (EQ) 41:01; Chen JT (EQ) 43:15; Shen YL (EQ) 44:21; Chao YT (PP) 50:23; Tseng HC (EQ) 54:35; Liao WC (EQ) 56:56; Liao WC (EQ) 57:14 / Goals	Referee: Park GJ (South Korea)

February 28, 2009; 16:00	Australia	16–1	South Africa	Annex Ice Rink; Attendance: 600

	Referee: K Hokkanen (Japan)
R Outred (EQ) 09:27; M Wetini (EQ) 15:10; W Darge (EQ) 15:48; W Darge (PP) 16:41; S Best (PP) 23.20; M Wong (PP) 27:52; S Best (PP) 34:00; A McKenzie (EQ) 34:08; A McKenzie (EQ) 37:53; S Best (PP) 44:35; J McFadden (PP) 45:10; W Darge (EQ) 46:05; K Dolling (EQ) 47:30; W Darge (PP) 54:35; C McPhail (PP) 58:22; A McKenzie (EQ) 59:41 / Goals / U Samaai(EQ) 32:14	Referee: K Hokkanen (Japan)

February 28, 2009; 19:00	Chinese Taipei	1–4	New Zealand	Annex Ice Rink; Attendance: 1,000

	Referee: R van Gameren (Germany)
Liu YL (SH) 57:35 / Goals / J Carr (EQ) 08:11; C McDermid (SH) 23:41; C Dale (EQ) 31:11; C McDermid (EQ) 41:06	Referee: R van Gameren (Germany)

March 2, 2009; 16:00	Australia	33–0	Mongolia	Annex Ice Rink; Attendance: 150

	Referee: Park GJ (South Korea)
W Darge (EQ) 00:53; W Darge (EQ) 04:15; J McFadden (EQ) 04:53; K Dolling (EQ) 10:29; R Outred (EQ) 10:41; E Sewell (EQ) 11:45; B Cliff (EQ) 12:09; J McFadden (EQ) 13:04; E Sewell (EQ) 15:32; A McKenzie (EQ) 16:16; S Best (EQ) 17:16; J Kyros (EQ) 17:46; S Best (EQ) 18:20; A McKenzie (EQ) 21:40; B Cliff (EQ) 23:56; J Kyros (EQ) 25:07; S Renner (EQ) 26:44; S McGregor (EQ) 30:33; K Dolling (EQ) 31:29; W Darge (EQ) 34:07; R McLeod (EQ) 34:22; W Darge (EQ) 38:27; W Darge (EQ) 38:45; K Dolling (EQ) 41:11; W Darge (EQ) 44:00; J McFadden (EQ) 47:15; C Vickers (PP) 51:35; S Austin (EQ) 52:34; A McKenzie (EQ) 53:11; W Darge (EQ) 53:38; B Funes (EQ) 58:17; C Vickers (EQ) 59:14; R Outred (EQ) 59:53 / Goals	Referee: Park GJ (South Korea)

March 2, 2009; 19:00	New Zealand	5–3	South Africa	Annex Ice Rink; Attendance: 240

	Referee: K Hokkanen (Japan)
H King (EQ) 36:34; J Carr (EQ) 47:25; D Dunlop (PP) 50:10; M Frear (PP) 55:07; G Lloyd (EQ) 56:10 / Goals / U Samaai (PP) 29:43; U Samaai (SH) 30:52; C Labuschagne (PP) 51:54	Referee: K Hokkanen (Japan)

March 3, 2009; 16:00	Mongolia	1–19	New Zealand	Annex Ice Rink; Attendance: 100

	Referee: K Hokkanen (Japan)
Z Batdorj (PP) 43:12 / Goals / J Challis (PP) 04:31; J Challis (PP) 13:38; H King (PP) 14:02; A Gouldstone (PP) 25:19; L Pickering (EQ) 27:22; D Dickson (EQ) 29:01; D Dunlop (EQ) 30:30; H Dunlop (PP) 34:15; G Lloyd (EQ) 35:14; J Challis (EQ) 36:08; H Dunlop (EQ) 37:04; J Challis (PP) 38:34; D Dickson (EQ) 39:24; J Challis (EQ) 47:00; D Dunlop (EQ) 47:29; D Dickson (PP) 60:13; J Challis (EQ) 51:11; C McDermid (EQ) 54:38; M Attwell (PP) 58:54	Referee: K Hokkanen (Japan)

March 3, 2009; 19:00	South Africa	3–8	Chinese Taipei	Annex Ice Rink; Attendance: 700

	Referee: R van Gameren (Germany)
C Labuschagne (EQ) 18:24; K van Rooyen (EQ) 36:20; C Nebe (PP) 58:18 / Goals / Hsiao PY (PP) 05:25; Shih KY (EQ) 16:07; Tseng HC (EQ) 32:22; Juan KF (EQ) 33:33; Tseng HC (PP) 35:03; Liao WC (EQ) 35:42; Juan KF (EQ) 39:30; Weng T (EQ) 56:17	Referee: R van Gameren (Germany)

March 5, 2009; 16:00	South Africa	12–3	Mongolia	Annex Ice Rink; Attendance: 120

	Referee: R van Gameren (Germany)
C Labuschagne (PP) 05:15; J Goodwin (EQ) 11:28; U Samaai (SH) 13:54; Kyle van Rooyen (EQ) 17:08; U Samaai (SH) 20:50; C Labuschagne (EQ) 29:50; C Labuschagne (EQ) 32:06; C Labuschagne (EQ) 32:31; C Williams (SH) 45:44; W du Preez (EQ) 54:38; C Labuschagne (EQ) 55:03; J Johnson (PP) 57:51 / Goals / S Zagdjav (EQ) 27:11; A Ganbat (EQ) 38:45; T Dondov (EQ) 40:54	Referee: R van Gameren (Germany)

March 5, 2009; 19:00	Australia	7–2	Chinese Taipei	Annex Ice Rink; Attendance: 1,200

	Referee: Park GJ (South Korea)
W Darge (EQ) 29:28; W Darge (EQ) 29:34; K Dolling (EQ) 30:20; B Cliff (PP) 32:25; W Darge (EQ) 36:17; E Sewell (EQ) 39:52; W Darge (PP) 56:37 / Goals / Liu YL (PP) 12:25; Juan KF (PP) 17:29	Referee: Park GJ (South Korea)

== Group B ==
The Group B tournament was played in Erzurum, Turkey at GSIM Yenişehir Ice Hockey Hall from 9 to 15 March 2009.

=== Group stage ===
Pos	Team	Pld	W	OTW	OTL	L	GF	GA	GD	Pts	Qualification
1	Iceland	3	3	0	0	0	48	1	+47	9	Semifinals
2	Turkey	3	2	0	0	1	25	26	−1	6	Semifinals
3	Ireland	3	1	0	0	2	9	39	−30	3	Semifinals
4	Bulgaria	3	0	0	0	3	8	24	−16	0	Semifinals

Source: IIHF

All times are local.

March 9, 2009; 15:30	Bulgaria	0–11	Iceland	GSIM Yenişehir Ice Hockey Hall; Attendance: 200

	Referee: L. Gergely (Romania)
Goals / E Thormodsson (PP) 06:12; E Thormodsson (EQ) 16:36; O Bjornsson (EQ) 22:13; O Bjornsson (EQ) 28:13; O Bjornsson (PP) 34:56; E Thormodsson (EQ) 40:07; E Thormodsson (PP) 41:50; B Sigurdarson (PP) 42:00; R Palsson (PP) 51:31; B Sigurdarson (EQ) 57:22; E Thormodsson (EQ) 58:39	Referee: L. Gergely (Romania)

March 9, 2009; 19:00	Turkey	16–4	Ireland	GSIM Yenişehir Ice Hockey Hall; Attendance: 2,220

	Referee: A Sevruk (Ukraine)
S Gumus (EQ) 04:36; M Dalgic (EQ) 04:43; B Aksoy (EQ) 09:21; M Dalgic (EQ) 13:08; A Oguz (EQ) 17:21; B Aksoy (EQ) 17:30; C Baykan (SH) 19:22; S Gumus (EQ) 21:01; B Kosemen (EQ) 22:01; S Gumus (EQ) 30:09; M Dalgic (EQ) 30:17; C Baykan (PP) 31:48; S Gumus (EQ) 39:00; Y Halil (EQ) 45:48; S Yildirim (SH) 51:24; S Gumus (EQ) 53:28 / Goals / J McCrainor (PP) 23:11; C Grimason (EQ) 30:26; S Balmer (EQ) 47:16; C Grimason (EQ) 48:20	Referee: A Sevruk (Ukraine)

March 10, 2009; 15:30	Iceland	19–0	Ireland	GSIM Yenişehir Ice Hockey Hall; Attendance: 225

	Referee: V Krcelic (Croatia)
I Eliasson (PP) 01:40; B Sigurleifsson (EQ) 05:24; T Omarsson (PP) 06:50; B Sigurdarson (EQ) 07:57; A Sverrisson (EQ) 10:40; H Leifsson (EQ) 11:00; O Bjornsson (PP) 18:03; E Thormodsson (SH) 22:53; E Thormodsson (PP) 28:07; E Thormodsson (EQ) 28:18; E Thormodsson (EQ) 39:36; A Sverrisson (EQ) 39:45; B Sigurdarson (SH) 44:17; H Leifsson (PP) 46:06; G Sigurdsson (EQ) 46:23; E Thormodsson (PP) 55:50; G Sigurdsson (EQ) 56:10; O Bjornsson (PP) 58:51; H Gudmundsson (EQ) 59:53 / Goals	Referee: V Krcelic (Croatia)

March 10, 2009; 19:00	Turkey	8–4	Bulgaria	GSIM Yenişehir Ice Hockey Hall; Attendance: 2,100

	Referee: L. Gergely (Romania)
M Dalgic (EQ) 01:46; Y Halil (SH) 05:42; B Kosemen (EQ) 11:25; B Kosemen (EQ) 24:13; Y Halil (EQ) 35:40; C Baykan (PP) 45:42; S Yildirim (PP) 49:09; Y Halil (SH) 50:54 / Goals / P Mihov (EQ) 10:43; N Inzhevatov (PP) 16:11; T Kraynyanov (PP) 58:05; N Inzhevatov (EQ) 58:59	Referee: L. Gergely (Romania)

March 12, 2009; 15:30	Ireland	5–4	Bulgaria	GSIM Yenişehir Ice Hockey Hall; Attendance: 573

	Referee: Andriy Sevruk (Ukraine)
C Grimason (PP) 31:51; A Morris (EQ) 37:11; N McEvoy (EQ) 52:30; C Grimason (EQ) 52:55; C Grimason (PP) 59:27 / Goals / Dimitar Miloshev (EQ) 02:41; T Kraynyanov (PP) 23:27; P Mihov (PP) 30:53; Dimitar Miloshev (EQ) 32:20	Referee: Andriy Sevruk (Ukraine)

March 12, 2009; 19:00	Iceland	18–1	Turkey	GSIM Yenişehir Ice Hockey Hall; Attendance: 2,350

	Referee: V Krcelic (Croatia)
A Sverrisson (EQ) 01:25; E Thormodsson (EQ) 04:01; B Sigurdarson (PP) 06:13; E Thormodsson (SH) 09:41; E Thormodsson (SH) 14:31; E Thormodsson (PS) 16:34; B Sigurdarson (EQ) 21:42; B Sigurdarson (EQ) 24:17; G Sigurdsson (EQ) 25:39; S Sigrbjornsson (EQ) 28:20; E Thormodsson (EQ) 30:47; E Thormodsson (EQ) 36:27; B Sigurdarson (SH) 45:06; A Ingason (EQ) 52:54; A Ingason (EQ) 53:35; T Omarsson (EQ) 53:54; O Bjornsson (PP) 55:31; E Thormodsson (EQ) 59:59 / Goals / B Kosemen (EQ) 03:50	Referee: V Krcelic (Croatia)

=== Playoffs ===
Semifinals
1	Iceland	15
4	Bulgaria	2
2	Turkey	9
3	Ireland	3

Final
1	Iceland	8
2	Turkey	2
Third place match
3	Ireland	6
4	Bulgaria	3

==== Semifinals ====
March 13, 2009; 15:30	Iceland	15–2	Bulgaria	GSIM Yenişehir Ice Hockey Hall; Attendance: 150

	Referee: L. Gergely (Romania)
O Gronholm (EQ) 06:37; A Ingason (EQ) 07:32; G Sigurdsson (EQ) 08:18; A Ingason (EQ) 17:23; O Bjornsson (EQ) 23:20; E Thormodsson (EQ) 24:40; S Sigrbjornsson (EQ) 30:43; G Sigurdsson (EQ) 39:52; B Sigurdarson (EQ) 40:18; O Bjornsson (EQ) 41:19; E Thormodsson (SH) 43:43; B Sigurdarson (SH) 45:00; H Leifsson (EQ) 45:28; S Sigrbjornsson (EQ) 51:52; E Thormodsson (EQ) 55:47 / Goals / M Nikolov (PP) 14:57; M Nikolov (PP) 38:01	Referee: L. Gergely (Romania)

March 13, 2009; 19:00	Turkey	9–3	Ireland	GSIM Yenişehir Ice Hockey Hall; Attendance: 2,155

	Referee: V Krcelic (Croatia)
B Kosemen (EQ) 00:40; S Yildirim(EQ) 02:33; C Baykan (EQ) 08:58; S Gumus (EQ) 14:55; B Kosemen (PP) 17:14; S Gumus (SH) 21:48; S Yildirim (EQ) 24:10; S Yildirim (PP) 24:46; Y Halil (PP) 35:19 / Goals / C Grimason (EQ) 04:29; C Grimason (EQ) 39:17; S Balmer (SH) 49:23	Referee: V Krcelic (Croatia)

==== Third place game ====
March 15, 2009; 13:30	Ireland	6–3	Bulgaria	GSIM Yenişehir Ice Hockey Hall; Attendance: 187

	Referee: V Krcelic (Croatia)
C Grimason (EQ) 09:53; C Grimason (PP) 12:57; A Morris (EQ) 27:52; R Larkin (EQ) 33:06; C Grimason (EQ) 33:31; R Larkin (EQ) 39:48 / Goals / D Miloshev (EQ) 05:16; D Miloshev (EQ) 15:03; P Mihov (PP) 52:50	Referee: V Krcelic (Croatia)

==== Final game ====
March 15, 2009; 17:00	Iceland	8–2	Turkey	GSIM Yenişehir Ice Hockey Hall; Attendance: 2,497

	Referee: L. Gergely (Romania)
O Bjornsson (EQ) 00:45; E Thormodsson (EQ) 03:45; O Bjornsson (PP) 18:23; K Gunnlaugsson (EQ) 18:56; J Leifsson (EQ) 19:20; E Thormodsson (SH) 32:59; B Sigurdarson (EQ) 41:04; O Bjornsson (EQ) 47:37 / Goals / S Gumus (EQ) 22:17; S Gumus (EQ) 55:38	Referee: L. Gergely (Romania)

=== Final standings ===
Position	Team	Promotion
1	Iceland	Promoted to the 2010 IIHF World U18 Championship Division II
2	Turkey	
3	Ireland	
4	Bulgaria	

== See also ==
- List of sporting events in Taiwan
