= Radim (given name) =

Radim is a Slavic origin male given name. Derived from the Slavic elements rad care, joy and mer great, famous. The second element has also been associated with mir meaning peace or world. Nicknames are Radya, Radimek, Dima, Radek. Pronounced RAHD-yeem (shortly).

== Name Days ==
- Czech: 25 August
- Slovak: 14 January

== Notable Czech bearers ==
- Radim Běleš (born 1973), Paralympic athlete
- Radim Bičánek (born 1975), ice hockey player
- Radim Breite (born 1989), footballer
- Radim Drejsl (1923–1953), composer, pianist and conductor
- Radim Gaudentius (c. 970 – c. 1020), saint, Archbishop of Gniezno and the first Polish archbishop
- Radim Heřman (born 1991), ice hockey player
- Radim Hladík (1946–2016), guitarist
- Radim Holub (born 1975), footballer
- Radim Hruška (born 1984), ice hockey player
- Radim Jančura (born 1972), businessman
- Radim Kopecký (born 1985), footballer
- Radim Kořínek (born 1973), cyclist
- Radim Kučera (born 1974), footballer
- Radim Kucharczyk (born 1979), ice hockey player
- Radim Mrtka (born 2007), ice hockey player
- Radim Nečas (born 1969), footballer
- Radim Nečas (born 1988), footballer
- Radim Nepožitek (born 1988), footballer
- Radim Novák (born 1978), footballer
- Radim Nyč (born 1966), cross country skier
- Radim Ostrčil (born 1989), ice hockey player
- Radim Palouš (1924–2015), filosof, pedagog, mluvčí Charity 77 a rektor University Karlovy v letech 1990–1994
- Radim Řezník (born 1989), footballer
- Radim Rulík (born 1965), ice hockey coach
- Radim Sablik (born 1974), footballer
- Radim Šimek (born 1992), ice hockey player
- Radim Skuhrovec (born 1974), ice hockey player
- Radim Uzel (1940–2022), sexologist
- Radim Vrbata (born 1981), ice hockey player
- Radim Wozniak (born 1978), footballer

== Other ==
- Radim Gaudentius, the first Archbishop of Gniezno

== See also ==
- Radzim (disambiguation)
