= Tim Bozon =

French ice hockey player

- Born: March 24, 1994 (age 32) St. Louis, Missouri, U.S.
- Height: 6 ft 1 in (185 cm)
- Weight: 183 lb (83 kg; 13 st 1 lb)
- Position: Left wing
- Shoots: Left
- NL team Former teams: Genève-Servette HC; EHC Kloten; Lausanne HC
- National team: France
- NHL draft: 64th overall, 2012; Montreal Canadiens
- Playing career: 2015–present

Timothé Phillipe Bozon (French pronunciation: [timɔte filip bozɔ̃]; born March 24, 1994) is an American-born French professional ice hockey player who is a left winger for Genève-Servette HC of the National League (NL). He was selected in the third round, 64th overall, by the Montreal Canadiens in the 2012 NHL entry draft.

Bozon was born in St. Louis, Missouri, where his father, Philippe, played for the St. Louis Blues, but was raised in France. As a teenager, Bozon moved to Switzerland to further his hockey career, before moving again to Canada after the Kamloops Blazers of the Western Hockey League (WHL) selected him in the 2011 CHL Import Draft. During his third season with the Blazers, Bozon was traded to the Kootenay Ice.

Internationally, he has played for the French national junior team in several tournaments, and joined the French national senior team for the 2013 IIHF World Championships. In early 2014, Bozon contracted a life-threatening meningococcal infection, though ultimately recovered.

== Playing career ==
=== Junior ===
Bozon grew up in Germany and Switzerland while his father, Philippe, played professionally in those countries, and began to play hockey himself in Mannheim while Philippe was a member of Adler Mannheim of the Deutsche Eishockey Liga (DEL). When Philippe moved to Switzerland, Bozon followed, and was a player for the junior clubs of Genève-Servette HC, the Kloten Flyers and HC Lugano.

At age 15, Bozon decided he wanted to follow the path of Nino Niederreiter, a fellow Swiss junior player who had just moved to North America at age 17 and joined a team in the Canadian Hockey League (CHL) to further his career. Bozon wanted to eventually play in the National Hockey League (NHL) and realized there were more scouts following teams in the CHL, which oversees three major junior hockey leagues in Canada and the United States. He had preferred to play for a team in the Ontario Hockey League (OHL), but was instead selected by the Kamloops Blazers of the Western Hockey League (WHL), twenty-seventh overall at the 2011 CHL Import Draft.

He joined the Blazers for the 2011–12 season, recording 36 goals and 35 assists for 71 points in the same number of games. His goal total was the most among all WHL rookies, whereas his points second among rookies and third overall on the Blazers. Bozon was recognised for his efforts by being named the WHL's Western Conference nominee for the Jim Piggott Memorial Trophy as WHL Rookie of the Year. He also was a co-recipient of the Blazers' own Rookie of the Year, along with goaltender Cole Cheveldave.

Midway through the season, Bozon was ranked 39th overall amongst North American-based skaters for the 2012 NHL entry draft by the NHL Central Scouting Bureau. When the final rankings for the draft were released at the conclusion of the season, Bozon was listed 42nd overall for North American skaters. At the draft, he was selected in the third round, 64th overall, by the Montreal Canadiens. Bozon was excited to be selected by the Canadiens, who are the only NHL team based in a predominantly French-speaking city.

Bozon recorded 36 goals and 91 points in 69 games during the 2012–13 season, finishing second on the Blazers in scoring and tied for eighth overall in the WHL. In the playoffs Bozon scored six points in eight games; a fractured wrist kept him out of most of the Blazers' playoff games.

On May 30, 2013, Bozon signed a three-year entry-level contract with the Canadiens. He was returned by the Canadiens to the Blazers for a third year with the team prior to the start of the 2013–14 season. After starting the season with the Blazers, where he was fifth in team scoring with seven points in thirteen games, Bozon was traded to the Kootenay Ice on October 22, 2013. The Blazers, who also sent defenceman Landon Cross, received Colin Shirley, Matt Thomas, and three draft picks in return.

Bozon's season was ended prematurely due to a diagnosis of Neisseria meningitidis on March 1, 2014; at that point he had recorded 62 points in 50 games for Kooteney. His illness caused him to lose 40 pounds (18 kg); he had difficulty speaking and had to re-learn how to walk. As he recovered, he resumed skating in June 2014 and by September, he attended the Canadiens' rookie camp. Bozon participated in the Canadiens main training camp, and later played three exhibition games with their American Hockey League (AHL) affiliate Hamilton Bulldogs; however it was decided that in consideration of the time missed due to his illness, it would be best for Bozon's development for him to play a final major junior season, and he was assigned to Kootenay for the 2014–15 season, where he appeared in 57 games and finished fourth on the team in scoring with 63 points.

=== Professional ===
After the conclusion of the WHL season, Bozon was assigned to the Bulldogs and made his professional debut, appearing in one game for the team. For the 2015–16 season, he was assigned to the St. John's IceCaps, as the Canadiens relocated the Bulldogs to St. John's, Newfoundland. He split the season with both St. John's, where he played 41 games and had 8 points, and the Canadiens' ECHL affiliate, the Brampton Beast, where he had 9 points in 15 games.

On October 6, 2016, prior to the 2016–17 season, Bozon was traded to the Florida Panthers in exchange for Jonathan Racine. He was immediately assigned to the Springfield Thunderbirds of the AHL for their inaugural season, and spent the season between them and the Manchester Monarchs of the ECHL, scoring 15 points in 43 games for Springfield, and another 6 points in 14 games for the Monarchs.

At the end of the season, and with his NHL contract over, Bozon signed a contract with Kloten to return to Switzerland. Because he played junior in the Swiss system, Bozon would not count against the team's import limit, despite being French. At the end of his first season with Kloten, the team got relegated to the Swiss League and Bozon was immediately released. Bozon tallied 12 points in 44 games and posted a poor -13 rating.

On July 17, 2018, Bozon followed in his dad's footsteps by joining Genève-Servette HC on a one-year deal. On February 7, 2019, Bozon was signed to a two-year contract extension by Geneva through the 2020–21 season. On November 30, 2019, Bozon cross-checked Mark Arcobello from behind who fell head first into the boards. The action resulted in a game misconduct for Bozon, along with both a four-game suspension and CHF 6,400 fine.

On September 14, 2020, Bozon and teammate Petr Čajka were traded to Lausanne HC in exchange for Joel Vermin.

== International play ==
Born in the United States and raised in Switzerland by French parents, Bozon possesses both American and French citizenship. However, he chose to play internationally for the France national team, as both his father and grandfather did. Regarding this choice, Bozon said: "All of my family are French, and my grandfather and father played for France's national team. It's why I play too."

At the 2011 IIHF World U18 Division I Championship, he helped France to a third-place finish, the first time the French under-18 team had ever won a medal in an International Ice Hockey Federation (IIHF) tournament. His six points in five games were tied for eleventh overall in tournament scoring and tied for the lead on the French team. Bozon declined to participate in the 2012 World Junior Division IB Championships due to a desire to remain in North America and help the Blazers.

Bozon made his debut for the French national senior team at the 2013 IIHF World Championship. His first game came against Slovakia and he recorded an assist. Collectively, he played in five of France's seven games during the tournament and finished with the one assist.

Bozon was named to the French national team coached by his dad for the 2019 IIHF World Championship in Slovakia. France lost all its 7 games and would be relegated to Division IA the following year.

== Personal life ==
Bozon's father Philippe, was the first French-born and -raised player in the NHL, and spent parts of four seasons with the St. Louis Blues between 1991 until 1994. Philippe returned to Europe in 1994, and played for teams in France, Germany and Switzerland. He participated in four Olympics for France and became a coach after his playing career ended; in recognition of his international play, he was inducted into the International Ice Hockey Federation (IIHF) Hall of Fame in 2008.

Bozon was raised in Lugano, Switzerland, along with his older sister Allison (b. 1992) and younger brother Kévin (b. 1995). His mother, Hélène Barbier, was an alpine skier. Bozon's grandfather, Alain, also played hockey, and captained the French national team in the 1960s and was inducted into the French Ice Hockey Hall of Fame in 2012. Aside from English, Bozon speaks French, Italian and German.

On March 1, 2014, the day after a game against the Saskatoon Blades, Bozon was admitted to Royal University Hospital in Saskatoon, Saskatchewan, where he was diagnosed with Neisseria meningitidis. He spent four weeks in hospital, some of it in a medically induced coma, before being released on March 28, 2014.

== Career statistics ==
=== Regular season and playoffs ===
			Regular season					Playoffs
Season	Team	League	GP	G	A	Pts	PIM	GP	G	A	Pts	PIM
2007–08	Genève-Servette U15	Swiss U15	31	30	24	54	24	—	—	—	—	—
2007–08	Genève-Servette U17	Swiss U17	4	4	2	6	0	—	—	—	—	—
2008–09	Genève-Servette U15	Swiss U15	12	15	5	20	24	—	—	—	—	—
2008–09	Genève-Servette U17	Swiss U17	29	15	8	23	18	—	—	—	—	—
2009–10	Kloten Flyers	Swiss U17	30	26	29	55	22	10	2	4	6	10
2009–10	Kloten Flyers	Elte Jr. A	3	2	0	2	4	—	—	—	—	—
2010–11	Kloten Flyers	Elite Jr. A	3	1	0	1	0	—	—	—	—	—
2010–11	Lugano U17	Swiss U17	8	8	9	17	18	5	2	1	3	22
2010–11	HC Lugano U20	Elite Jr. A	27	16	13	29	24	3	1	1	2	0
2011–12	Kamloops Blazers	WHL	71	36	35	71	40	11	5	0	5	11
2012–13	Kamloops Blazers	WHL	69	36	55	91	58	8	4	2	6	10
2013–14	Kamloops Blazers	WHL	13	3	4	7	13	—	—	—	—	—
2013–14	Kootenay Ice	WHL	50	30	32	62	34	7	3	6	9	6
2014–15	Kootenay Ice	WHL	57	35	28	63	19	—	—	—	—	—
2014–15	Hamilton Bulldogs	AHL	1	0	0	0	0	—	—	—	—	—
2015–16	St. John's IceCaps	AHL	41	5	3	8	14	—	—	—	—	—
2015–16	Brampton Beast	ECHL	15	3	6	9	2	—	—	—	—	—
2016–17	Springfield Thunderbirds	AHL	43	8	7	15	24	—	—	—	—	—
2016–17	Manchester Monarchs	ECHL	14	3	3	6	0	—	—	—	—	—
2017–18	EHC Kloten	NL	44	7	5	12	41	—	—	—	—	—
2018–19	Genève-Servette	NL	42	4	10	14	10	6	1	1	2	2
2019–20	Genève-Servette	NL	42	7	7	14	31	—	—	—	—	—
2020–21	Lausanne HC	NL	47	10	5	15	24	3	0	0	0	27
2021–22	Lausanne HC	NL	50	6	11	17	14	7	1	2	3	4
2022–23	Lausanne HC	NL	46	9	8	17	8	—	—	—	—	—
2023–24	Lausanne HC	NL	51	16	12	28	8	18	3	4	7	58
2024–25	Lausanne HC	NL	52	13	13	26	18	13	4	6	10	4
NL totals			374	72	71	143	154	58	9	16	25	126

=== International ===
Year	Team	Event	Result	GP	G	A	Pts	PIM
2010	France	U18 DI	DNQ	5	0	1	1	0
2011	France	U18 DI	DNQ	5	3	3	6	2
2013	France	WC	13th	5	0	1	1	0
2016	France	WC	14th	6	0	0	0	2
2019	France	WC	15th	7	0	4	4	2
2021	France	OGQ	DNQ	3	0	2	2	0
2022	France	WC	12th	7	0	4	4	2
2023	France	WC	12th	7	1	4	5	0
2024	France	WC	14th	7	0	2	2	2
2024	France	OGQ	DNQ	3	2	1	3	0
2025	France	WC	16th	6	2	1	3	0
Junior totals				10	3	4	7	2
Senior totals				51	5	19	24	8
