= 2013 IIHF World U18 Championship Division III =

2013 IIHF U18 World Championship Division III

Tournament details
- Host countries: Taiwan; Turkey
- Dates: 11–16 March 2013; 7–10 February 2013
- Teams: 9

The 2013 IIHF U18 World Championship Division III was two international under-18 ice hockey tournaments organised by the International Ice Hockey Federation. The Division III A and Division III B tournaments represent the sixth and the seventh tier of the IIHF World U18 Championships.

== Division III A ==
The Division III A tournament was played in Taipei City, Taiwan, from 11 to 16 March 2013.

=== Participants ===
Team	Qualification
China	placed 6th in 2012 Division II B and were relegated
New Zealand	placed 2nd in 2012 Division III A
Mexico	placed 3rd in 2012 Division III A
Bulgaria	placed 4th in 2012 Division III A
Chinese Taipei	hosts, placed 5th in 2012 Division III A

=== Final standings ===
Pos	Team	Pld	W	OTW	OTL	L	GF	GA	GD	Pts	Promotion
1	China	4	4	0	0	0	34	3	+31	12	Promoted to the 2014 Division II B
2	New Zealand	4	3	0	0	1	20	12	+8	9	
3	Chinese Taipei	4	2	0	0	2	16	19	−3	6	
4	Bulgaria	4	1	0	0	3	8	32	−24	3	
5	Mexico	4	0	0	0	4	3	15	−12	0	

Source: IIHF

=== Results ===
All times are local. (National Standard Time – UTC+8)

11 March 2013; 15:00	Chinese Taipei	4–9 (1–3, 1–2, 2–4)	New Zealand	Annex Ice Rink, Taipei City

Game reference

Fu-Hsiang Kuei
Goalies
Jakeb Dix
Referee:
(Japan) Hideki Yamauchi
Linesmen:
(South Korea) Hong Hyun-kook
(Canada) Benoit Martineau

Shao-Hung Hsu (Po-Yun Hsiao) – SH 08:40	1–0
	1–1	09:13 PP – Oliver Hay (Lachlan Frear)
	1–2	16:34 – Richard Dawson
	1–3	18:58 PP – Aaron Henderson (Oliver Hay)
Chi-Lun Hung (Tzu-Chieh Lin) – 22:25	2–3
	2–4	25:30 PP – Maxwell Macharg (Callum Burns)
	2–5	36:24 – Tomas Heather (Oliver Hay, Frazer Ellis)
	2–6	40:47 – Benedict Roth (Tomas Heather, Maxwell Macharg)
	2–7	47:26 – Aaron Henderson (Oliver Hay, Frazer Ellis)
Tzu-Chieh Lin (Chi-Lun Hung) – 52:17	3–7
	3–8	52:57 – Joseph Orr
Wei-Lun Yin (Ching Kuan) – PP 54:31	4–8
	4–9	58:57 – Frazer Ellis (Aaron Henderson)

12 min
Penalties
12 min
56
Shots
62

11 March 2013; 19:00	Mexico	0–6 (0–2, 0–1, 0–3)	China	Annex Ice Rink, Taipei City

Game reference

Richard Albrecht
Goalies
Sun Zehao
Referee:
(Canada) Jamie Miller
Linesmen:
(United States) Judson Ritter
(Australia) Mitchell Waters

0–1	07:38 PP – Zhang Zesen (Zuo Tianyou)
0–2	09:58 – Wang Shaofeng (Zhang Shuchao)
0–3	36:16 – Ji Peng (Xiang Xudong)
0–4	44:19 – Zuo Tianyou
0–5	57:18 – Xiang Xudong (Zhang Shuchao, Ji Peng)
0–6	59:34 SH – Li Hang

26 min
Penalties
34 min
9
Shots
75

12 March 2013; 19:00	Bulgaria	2–9 (0–3, 0–4, 2–2)	Chinese Taipei	Annex Ice Rink, Taipei City

Game reference

Stefan Yurukov
Goalies
Fu-Hsiang Kuei
Referee:
(South Korea) Mun Jae-hyung
Linesmen:
(New Zealand) Braden O'Loughlin
(Australia) Mitchell Waters

	0–1	05:32 – Li-Te Wang (Po-Yun Hsiao)
	0–2	11:44 – Yi-Wei Chiu (You-Chen Chen)
	0–3	19:05 PP – Po-Yun Hsiao (Yu-Wei Lin)
	0–4	21:22 SH – Shao-Hung Hsu (Po-Yun Hsiao)
	0–5	23:29 PP – Li-Te Wang (Shao-Hung Hsu, Po-Yun Hsiao)
	0–6	33:01 – Wei-Lun Yin
	0–7	39:17 – Tse-Wei CHANG (Shang-Yu Tu)
	0–8	47:36 PP – Ching Kuan
	0–9	50:30 – Shang-Yu Tu (Shao-Hung Hsu)
Dimitar Mahmudiev (Veselin Dikov) – 56:14	1–9
Maksim Eftimov (Dimitar Mahmudiev) – PP 59:50	2–9

24 min
Penalties
18 min
24
Shots
60

13 March 2013; 15:30	China	14–0 (6–0, 2–0, 6–0)	Bulgaria	Annex Ice Rink, Taipei City

Game reference

Sun Zehao
Goalies
Dimitar Videnov
Referee:
(South Korea) Mun Jae-hyung
Linesmen:
(South Korea) Hong Hyun-kook
(New Zealand) Braden O'Loughlin

Zhu Ziyang (Ji Peng, Xiang Xudong) – 01:47	1–0
Xiang Xudong (Zhu Ziyang) – 04:29	2–0
Zhang Shuchao (Zhang Wenqinghuai) – 09:51	3–0
Wu Jiasiteng – 14:58	4–0
Zhu Ziyang (Ji Peng, Xiang Xudong) – 15:47	5–0
Zhang Shuchao (Li Hang) – 19:58	6–0
Zhu Ziyang (Xiang Xudong, Ji Peng) – 26:40	7–0
Zuo Tianyou – 36:18	8–0
Zuo Tianyou – SH 46:17	9–0
Xiang Xudong (Zhu Ziyang, Ji Peng) – 49:38	10–0
Zhang Shuchao (Liu Yongshen) – 50:22	11–0
Zhang Zesen (Zuo Tianyou) – 50:55	12–0
Zhu Ziyang (Xiang Xudong) – 51:05	13–0
Ji Peng – 55:17	14–0

16 min
Penalties
6 min
57
Shots
19

13 March 2013; 19:00	New Zealand	2–0 (0–0, 2–0, 0–0)	Mexico	Annex Ice Rink, Taipei City

Game reference
Daniel Lee	Goalies	Richard Albrecht	Referee: (Japan) Hideki Yamauchi; Linesmen: (Canada) Benoit Martineau (United States) Judson Ritter
Maxwell Macharg (Callum Burns) – 24:28 / 1–0; Lachlan Frear (Frazer Ellis) – PP 30:57 / 2–0			Referee: (Japan) Hideki Yamauchi; Linesmen: (Canada) Benoit Martineau (United States) Judson Ritter
37 min	Penalties	20 min	Referee: (Japan) Hideki Yamauchi; Linesmen: (Canada) Benoit Martineau (United States) Judson Ritter
42	Shots	22	Referee: (Japan) Hideki Yamauchi; Linesmen: (Canada) Benoit Martineau (United States) Judson Ritter

14 March 2013; 19:00	Chinese Taipei	0–8 (0–2, 0–2, 0–4)	China	Annex Ice Rink, Taipei City

Game reference

Fu-Hsiang Kuei
Goalies
Sun Zehao
Referee:
(Canada) Jamie Miller
Linesmen:
(South Korea) Hong Hyun-kook
(Australia) Mitchell Waters

0–1	05:41 – Li Hang (Liu Qing, Zhang Wenqinghuai)
0–2	40:46 PP – Zhang Shuchao
0–3	22:18 – Zuo Tianyou (Zhang Zhen)
0–4	31:44 PP – Liu Yongshen
0–5	45:21 – Zhang Wenqinghuai (Liu Yongshen)
0–6	46:20 – Zhang Zesen (Lu Hengnan)
0–7	52:20 – Ji Peng
0–8	56:26 – Liu Yongshen (Huang Peng, Zhang Shuchao)

14 min
Penalties
35 min
23
Shots
49

15 March 2013; 15:30	Mexico	0–3 (0–1, 0–2, 0–0)	Chinese Taipei	Annex Ice Rink, Taipei City

Game reference

Richard Albrecht
Goalies
Fu-Hsiang Kuei
Referee:
(Japan) Hideki Yamauchi
Linesmen:
(New Zealand) Braden O'Loughlin
(United States) Judson Ritter

0–1	10:40 – Hou-Chung Ti (Chi-Ting Lai)
0–2	24:09 – Wei-Lun Yin (Ching Kuan)
0–3	33:49 PP – Shao-Hung Hsu (Po-Yun Hsiao)

24 min
Penalties
16 min
13
Shots
52

15 March 2013; 19:00	New Zealand	6–2 (0–0, 1–1, 5–1)	Bulgaria	Annex Ice Rink, Taipei City

Game reference

Jakeb Dix
Goalies
Dimitar Videnov
Referee:
(Canada) Jamie Miller
Linesmen:
(South Korea) Hong Hyun-kook
(Canada) Benoit Martineau

	0–1	23:32 PP – Veselin Dikov (Vasil Videnov, Maksim Eftimov)
Liam Dallimore (Keegan Maisey) – 37:18	1–1
	1–2	46:06 – Valentin Botsev (Tomislav Georgiev)
Benedict Roth (Frazer Ellis, Aaron Henderson) – PP 48:47	2–2
Tomas Heather (Maxwell Macharg, Richard Dawson) – PP 50:10	3–2
Oliver Hay (Frazer Ellis) – 55:52	4–2
Maxwell Macharg (Richard Dawson) – 56:13	5–2
Joseph Orr (Maxwell Macharg) – 57:41	6–2

28 min
Penalties
10 min
42
Shots
20

16 March 2013; 15:00	Bulgaria	4–3; 2–1, 1–2, 1–0	Mexico	Annex Ice Rink, Taipei City

Game reference

Dimitar Videnov
Goalies
Richard Albrecht
Referee:
(South Korea) Mun Jae-hyung
Linesmen:
(New Zealand) Braden O'Loughlin
(Australia) Mitchell Waters

Tomislav Georgiev (Momchil Krastev, Kristian Semkov) – 04:13	1–0
	1–1	08:39 – Miguel Navarro (Fabian Alva)
Maksim Eftimov – 16:44	2–1
	2–2	25:57 – Arturo Garcia
Veselin Dikov (Momchil Krastev) – 26:45	3–2
	3–3	33:25 – David Barron (Daniel Benbassat)
Maksim Eftimov (Tomislav Georgiev, Veselin Dikov) – 47:55	4–3

4 min
Penalties
10 min
31
Shots
26

16 March 2013; 19:00	China	6–3; 0–1, 5–2, 1–0	New Zealand	Annex Ice Rink, Taipei City

Game reference

Sun Zehao
Goalies
Daniel Lee
Referee:
(Japan) Hideki Yamauchi
Linesmen:
(Canada) Benoit Martineau
(United States) Judson Ritter

	0–1	04:03 – Frazer Ellis (Oliver Hay)
Zhu Ziyang (Xiang Xudong) – PP 22:01	1–1
Zuo Tianyou – 24:58	2–1
Zhang Zesen – 29:12	3–1
Liu Yongshen (Liu Qing) – PP 33:07	4–1
Lu Hengnan – 33:52	5–1
	5–2	34:40 – Keegan Maisey
	5:3	39:03 SH – Joshua Louw
Li Hang – ENG 58:26	6:3

22 min
Penalties
26 min
54
Shots
34

=== Awards ===
==== Best Players Selected by the Directorate ====
Award	No.	Name	Team
Best Goalkeeper	1	Sun Zehao	China
Best Defenseman	5	Ching Kuan	Chinese Taipei
Best Forward	22	Ji Peng	China

==== Best Players of Each Team Selected by Coaches ====
Team	No.	Name
Bulgaria	8	Maksim Eftimov
China	22	Ji Peng
Mexico	20	Richard Albrecht
New Zealand	10	Callum Burns
Chinese Taipei	7	Po-Yun Hsiao

== Division III B ==
The Division III B tournament was played in İzmit, Turkey, from 7 to 10 February 2013.

=== Participants ===
Team	Qualification
South Africa	placed 6th in 2012 Division III A and were relegated
Ireland	
Israel	
Turkey	hosts

=== Final standings ===
Pos	Team	Pld	W	OTW	OTL	L	GF	GA	GD	Pts	Promotion
1	Israel	3	3	0	0	0	25	4	+21	9	Promoted to the 2014 Division III A
2	South Africa	3	2	0	0	1	14	7	+7	6	
3	Turkey	3	1	0	0	2	13	13	0	3	
4	Ireland	3	0	0	0	3	6	34	−28	0	

Source: IIHF

=== Results ===
All times are local. (Eastern European Time – UTC+2)

7 February 2013; 15:00	Israel	16–2 (6–1, 4–0, 6–1)	Ireland	K.B.B. Ice Arena, İzmit; Attendance: 150

Game reference

Dan Amar
Goalies
Adam Roche
Referee:
(Iceland) Olafur Osaldsson
Linesmen:
(Turkey) Onur Ozturk
(Turkey) Argun Ture

A. Ibragimov – 02:02	1–0
R. Vainshtein (B. Zimmerman, T. May) – SH 07:49	2–0
B. Zimmerman – 11:01	3–0
A. Ibragimov (R. Aharonovich, T. Rafaely) – 11:59	4–0
	4–1	12:51 – S. Coleman
Y. Rosenthal (O. Kafri) – PP 17:13	5–1
Y. Levy (B. Zimmerman, Y. Rosenthal) – 17:34	6–1
R. Aharonovich (I. Chen) – 27:33	7–1
Y. Feigin (I. Chen) – 32:01	8–1
T. May (Y. Rosenthal, Y. Levy) – PP 34:57	9–1
D. Boudnikov (R. Vainshtein) – 36:39	10–1
Y. Levy (B. Driz, D. Boudnikov) – 47:04	11–1
	11–2	49:18 – S. Donnelly
U. Gindi – 52:52	12–2
B. Zimmerman (Y. Rosenthal, O. Kafri) – 54:13	13–2
Y. Rosenthal (R. Vainshtein) – 54:59	14–2
A. Ibragimov (R. Aharonovich) – 56:56	15–2
A. Ibragimov – 57:05	16–2

4 min
Penalties
10 min
48
Shots
4

7 February 2013; 18:30	Turkey	2–5 (0–3, 0–1, 2–1)	South Africa	K.B.B. Ice Arena, İzmit; Attendance: 212

Game reference

Berk Akin
Goalies
Charl Pretorius
Referee:
(Romania) Valentin Lascar
Linesmen:
(Belarus) Vadzim Yazerski
(Romania) Alexandru Butucel

	0–1	08:58 – W. Krotz (L. Stringer)
	0–2	13:07 PP – S. dr Preez (D. Compton)
	0–3	13:53 – K. Austin (R. Young)
	0–4	27:31 – S. du Preez (D. Verwey)
M. Kiraz – 47:13	1–4
K. Ozdemir – 49:30	2–4
	2–5	53:39 – S. du Preez (D. Verwey)

16 min
Penalties
20 min
23
Shots
22

9 February 2013; 15:00	South Africa	8–2 (4–0, 2–2, 2–0)	Ireland	K.B.B. Ice Arena, İzmit; Attendance: 322

Game reference

Marcello Strydom
Goalies
Anthony Coy
Referee:
(Iceland) Olafur Osaldsson
Linesmen:
(Turkey) Onur Ozturk
(Turkey) Argun Ture

W. Krotz (R. Fourie) – 02:23	1–0
S. du Preez – 08:28	2–0
A. Obery – 09:44	3–0
D. Compton (D. Verwey, K. Thornton) – 17:12	4–0
	4–1	21:24 – S. Coleman (C. Redmond)
R. Fourie – PP 27:12	5–1
	5–2	28:40 – S. Coleman (C. Redmond, J. McGailey)
S. du Preez (W. Krotz, L. Stringer) – PP 32:43	6–2
W. Krotz (R. Fourie, A. Obery) – PP 46:51	7–2
L. Stringer – PP 53:13	8–2

18 min
Penalties
26 min
50
Shots
18

9 February 2013; 18:30	Israel	6–1 (0–0, 2–1, 4–0)	Turkey	K.B.B. Ice Arena, İzmit; Attendance: 1,155

Game reference

Nadav Noy
Goalies
Berk Akin
Referee:
(Kazakhstan) Eduard Ibatulin
Linesmen:
(Belarus) Vadzim Yazerski
(Romania) Alexandru Butucel

	0–1	35:02 – A. Inanic (M. Kiraz)
B. Zimmerman – PP 38:31 PP	1–1
Y. Rosenthal (D. Gotshtein) – PP 39:46	2–1
Y. Rosenthal (B. Zimmerman) – PP 40:27	3–1
Y. Rosenthal (B. Zimmerman) – 49:11	4–1
B. Zimmerman (Y. Rosenthal, R. Vainshtein) – 55:46	5–1
D. Boudnikov – PP 59:51	6–1

18 min
Penalties
16 min
55
Shots
21

10 February 2013; 15:00	South Africa	1–3 (0–1, 0–1, 1–1)	Israel	K.B.B. Ice Arena, İzmit; Attendance: 123

Game reference

Charl Pretorius
Goalies
Nadav Noy
Referee:
(Kazakhstan) Eduard Ibatulin
Linesmen:
(Turkey) Onur Ozturk
(Turkey) Argun Ture

	0–1	19:33 – R. Vainshtein (Y. Rosenthal, B. Zimmerman)
	0–2	39:35 – R. Aharonovich
G. Bremner – 53:16	1–2
	1–3	55:30 – B. Zimmerman (B. Driz)

6 min
Penalties
14 min
11
Shots
26

10 February 2013; 18:30	Turkey	10–2 (3–1, 2–0, 5–1)	Ireland	K.B.B. Ice Arena, İzmit; Attendance: 609

Game reference

Berk Akin
Goalies
Christian McEvoy
Referee:
(Romania) Valentin Lascar
Linesmen:
(Belarus) Vadzim Yazerski
(Romania) Alexandru Butucel

	0–1	03:59 – C. Redmond
M. Kiraz (E. Doru) – SH 05:41	1–1
S. Takar (S. Kavas, A. Inanc) – 07:12	2–1
K. Ozdemir (E. Savas) – 14:21	3–1
A. Inanc – PP 27:39	4–1
F. Faner – SH 33:06	5–1
M. Kiraz – 46:17	6–1
	6–2	53:45 – C. Redmond
K. Ozdemir (M. Kiraz) – 54:51	7–2
B. Ustun (K. Ozdemir, F. Faner) – PP 56:53	8–2
M. Kiraz (B. Ustun, F. Faner) – SH 58:31	9–2
B. Ustun (M. Kiraz) – PP 59:46	10–2

40 min
Penalties
28 min
56
Shots
25

=== Awards ===
Award	No.	Name	Team
Man Of The Match	22	Shane Donnelly	Ireland

==== Best Players Selected by the Directorate ====
Award	No.	Name	Team
Best Goalkeeper	1	Berk Akin	Turkey
Best Defenseman	12	Luke Stringer	South Africa
Best Forward	24	Bar Zimmerman	Israel

==== Best Players of Each Team Selected by Coaches ====
Team	No.	Name
Ireland	8	Conor Fleming
Israel	15	Yuval Rosenthal
South Africa	6	Wesley Krotz
Turkey	4	Fatih Faner

== See also ==
- List of sporting events in Taiwan
