= 2010 IIHF World U18 Championship Division III =

Tournament details
- Host countries: Turkey; Mexico
- Venues: 2 (in 2 host cities)
- Dates: 8–14 March 2010; 14–20 March 2010
- Teams: 10

The 2010 IIHF World U18 Championship Division III was an international under-18 ice hockey competition organised by the International Ice Hockey Federation. Both Division III tournaments made up the fourth level of the IIHF World U18 Championships. The Group A tournament was played in Erzurum, Turkey, and the Group B tournament was played in Monterrey, Mexico. China and New Zealand won the Group A and B tournaments respectively and gained promotion to the Division II of the 2011 IIHF World U18 Championships.

== Group A ==
The Group A tournament was played in Erzurum, Turkey, from 8 to 14 March 2010.

=== Final standings ===
Pos	Team	Pld	W	OTW	OTL	L	GF	GA	GD	Pts	Promotion
1	China	4	4	0	0	0	53	11	+42	12	Promoted to the 2011 Division II
2	Turkey	4	2	1	0	1	33	13	+20	8	
3	Chinese Taipei	4	2	0	0	2	30	18	+12	6	
4	Bulgaria	4	1	0	1	2	24	22	+2	4	
5	Mongolia	4	0	0	0	4	2	78	−76	0	

Source: IIHF

=== Results ===
All times are local (EET – UTC+02:00).

8 March 2010; 15:30	China	12–3 (3–1, 3–1, 6–1)	Bulgaria	GSIM Ice Arena, Erzurum

Game reference

8 March 2010; 19:00	Turkey	5–3 (1–1, 3–1, 1–1)	Chinese Taipei	GSIM Ice Arena, Erzurum

Game reference

9 March 2010; 15:30	Mongolia	1–18 (0–6, 1–7, 0–5)	Chinese Taipei	GSIM Ice Arena, Erzurum

Game reference

9 March 2010; 19:00	Bulgaria	4–5 OT (0–1, 2–3, 2–0) (0–1)	Turkey	GSIM Ice Arena, Erzurum

Game reference

10 March 2010; 19:00	China	27–0 (8–0, 14–0, 5–0)	Mongolia	GSIM Ice Arena, Erzurum

Game reference

11 March 2010; 19:00	Turkey	19–1 (7–0, 7–1, 5–0)	Mongolia	GSIM Ice Arena, Erzurum

Game reference

12 March 2010; 15:30	Chinese Taipei	4–9 (2–4, 2–2, 0–3)	China	GSIM Ice Arena, Erzurum

Game reference

12 March 2010; 19:00	Bulgaria	14–0 (4–0, 4–0, 6–0)	Mongolia	GSIM Ice Arena, Erzurum

Game reference

14 March 2010; 13:30	Chinese Taipei	5–3 (1–1, 3–2, 1–0)	Bulgaria	GSIM Ice Arena, Erzurum

Game reference

14 March 2010; 17:00	Turkey	4–5 (0–0, 2–1, 2–4)	China	GSIM Ice Arena, Erzurum

Game reference

== Group B ==
The Group B tournament was played in Monterrey, Mexico, from 14 to 20 March 2010.

=== Final standings ===
Pos	Team	Pld	W	OTW	OTL	L	GF	GA	GD	Pts	Promotion
1	New Zealand	4	4	0	0	0	26	16	+10	12	Promoted to the 2011 Division II
2	Mexico	4	3	0	0	1	15	11	+4	9	
3	South Africa	4	1	1	0	2	15	14	+1	5	
4	Israel	4	1	0	1	2	21	16	+5	4	
5	Ireland	4	0	0	0	4	6	26	−20	0	

Source: IIHF

=== Results ===
All times are local (CST – UTC−06:00).

14 March 2010; 16:00	New Zealand	9–8 (5–2, 0–3, 4–3)	Israel	Ice Complex, Monterrey

Game reference

14 March 2010; 19:30	Ireland	2–4 (1–3, 1–1, 0–0)	Mexico	Ice Complex, Monterrey

Game reference

15 March 2010; 16:00	New Zealand	7–2 (2–0, 1–2, 4–0)	Ireland	Ice Complex, Monterrey

Game reference

15 March 2010; 19:30	Mexico	4–2 (1–0, 2–0, 1–2)	South Africa	Ice Complex, Monterrey

Game reference

17 March 2010; 16:00	Ireland	2–7 (1–1, 0–3, 1–3)	South Africa	Ice Complex, Monterrey

Game reference

17 March 2010; 19:30	Israel	2–3 (0–3, 0–0, 2–0)	Mexico	Ice Complex, Monterrey

Game reference

19 March 2010; 16:00	Israel	8–0 (1–0, 4–0, 3–0)	Ireland	Ice Complex, Monterrey

Game reference

19 March 2010; 19:30	South Africa	2–5 (1–0, 1–4, 0–1)	New Zealand	Ice Complex, Monterrey

Game reference

20 March 2010; 16:00	South Africa	4–3 GWS (2–1, 1–0, 0–2) (0–0, 1–0)	Israel	Ice Complex, Monterrey

Game reference

20 March 2010; 19:30	Mexico	4–5 (3–0, 1–2, 0–3)	New Zealand	Ice Complex, Monterrey

Game reference

== See also ==
- 2010 IIHF World U18 Championships
- 2010 IIHF World U18 Championship Division I
- 2010 IIHF World U18 Championship Division II
