= 2004 IIHF World U18 Championship Division III =

Tournament details
- Host country: Bulgaria
- Dates: 6 – 14 March 2004
- Teams: 7

Tournament statistics
- Games played: 21

The 2004 IIHF World U18 Championship Division III was an international under-18 ice hockey tournament run by the International Ice Hockey Federation. The Division III tournament made up the fourth level of competition at the 2004 IIHF World U18 Championships and took place between 6 and 14 March 2004 in Sofia, Bulgaria. The tournament was won by Mexico who upon winning gained promotion, along with South Africa who finished in second place, to Division II of the 2005 IIHF World U18 Championships.

== Overview ==
The 2004 IIHF World U18 Championship Division III began on 6 March 2004 in Sofia, Bulgaria. Bosnia and Herzegovina, Israel, Mexico, New Zealand and Turkey returned to compete in the Division III competition after missing promotion at the previous years World Championships. Bulgaria and South Africa entered the Division III competition after being relegated from the Division II tournaments of the 2003 World U18 Championships. Mexico finished first after winning all six of their games and gained promotion to Division II of the 2005 IIHF World U18 Championships. South Africa who finished in second place also gained promotion to Division II and New Zealand finished in third place missing out on promotion only by goal difference. Turkey and Bosnia and Herzegovina finished in sixth and seventh place and were relegated to the 2005 IIHF World U18 Championship Division III Qualification tournament. Eduardo Glennie of Mexico finished as the tournaments top scorer after recording 20 points including 13 goals and seven assists.

== Standings ==
Pos	Team	Pld	W	D	L	GF	GA	GD	Pts	Promotion or relegation
1	Mexico	6	6	0	0	41	4	+37	12	Promoted to Division II for 2005
2	South Africa	6	4	1	1	40	11	+29	9	Promoted to Division II for 2005
3	New Zealand	6	4	1	1	28	6	+22	9	
4	Bulgaria	6	3	0	3	22	22	0	6	
5	Israel	6	2	0	4	15	28	−13	4	
6	Turkey	6	1	0	5	12	40	−28	2	Relegated to Division III Qualification for 2005
7	Bosnia and Herzegovina	6	0	0	6	7	54	−47	0	Relegated to Division III Qualification for 2005

=== Fixtures ===
All times local.

6 March 2004; 12:00	Bulgaria	1–4 (0–0, 0–2, 1–2)	New Zealand	Winter Sports Palace

Game reference

6 March 2004; 15:00	Mexico	10–0 (2–0, 5–0, 3–0)	Israel	Winter Sports Palace

Game reference

6 March 2004; 18:00	Turkey	7–3 (4–0, 2–1, 1–2)	Bosnia and Herzegovina	Winter Sports Palace

Game reference

7 March 2004; 12:00	New Zealand	2–2 (0–1, 1–0, 1–1)	South Africa	Winter Sports Palace

Game reference

7 March 2004; 15:00	Israel	1–7 (0–2, 1–3, 0–2)	Bulgaria	Winter Sports Palace

Game reference

7 March 2004; 18:00	Bosnia and Herzegovina	1–10 (0–1, 0–2, 1–7)	Mexico	Winter Sports Palace

Game reference

8 March 2004; 12:00	South Africa	6–4 (5–1, 0–1, 1–2)	Israel	Winter Sports Palace

Game reference

8 March 2004; 15:00	Turkey	0–8 (0–1, 0–3, 0–4)	New Zealand	Winter Sports Palace

Game reference

8 March 2004; 18:00	Bulgaria	7–2 (5–1, 1–1, 1–0)	Bosnia and Herzegovina	Winter Sports Palace

Game reference

10 March 2004; 12:00	New Zealand	0–2 (0–1, 0–1, 0–0)	Mexico	Winter Sports Palace

Game reference

10 March 2004; 15:00	Israel	4–1 (2–0, 2–1, 0–0)	Turkey	Winter Sports Palace

Game reference

10 March 2004; 18:00	Bosnia and Herzegovina	0–14 (0–4, 0–2, 0–8)	South Africa	Winter Sports Palace

Game reference

11 March 2004; 12:00	Israel	1–3 (0–0, 1–1, 0–2)	New Zealand	Winter Sports Palace

Game reference

11 March 2004; 15:00	South Africa	10–1 (2–0, 5–0, 3–1)	Turkey	Winter Sports Palace

Game reference

11 March 2004; 18:00	Bulgaria	1–6 (0–4, 0–1, 1–1)	Mexico	Winter Sports Palace

Game reference

13 March 2004; 12:00	New Zealand	11–0 (5–0, 1–0, 5–0)	Bosnia and Herzegovina	Winter Sports Palace

Game reference

13 March 2004; 15:00	Turkey	3–6 (0–3, 1–1, 2–2)	Bulgaria	Winter Sports Palace

Game reference

13 March 2004; 18:00	Mexico	4–2 (0–1, 2–0, 2–1)	South Africa	Winter Sports Palace

Game reference

14 March 2004; 11:00	Bosnia and Herzegovina	1–5 (0–1, 1–1, 0–3)	Israel	Winter Sports Palace

Game reference

14 March 2004; 15:00	Mexico	9–0 (3–0, 3–0, 3–0)	Turkey	Winter Sports Palace

Game reference

14 March 2004; 18:00	South Africa	6–0 (2–0, 2–0, 2–0)	Bulgaria	Winter Sports Palace

Game reference

== Scoring leaders ==
List shows the top ten skaters sorted by points, then goals.

Player	GP	G	A	Pts	+/−	PIM	POS
(Mexico) Eduardo Glennie	6	13	7	20	+21	4	F
(Mexico) Cristofer Kello	6	12	7	19	+21	4	F
(South Africa) Matthew Cornforth	6	8	6	14	+14	10	F
(South Africa) Johann Genis	6	6	8	14	+13	2	F
(South Africa) Ian Ashworth	6	6	7	13	+13	2	D
(Israel) Oren Zamir	6	11	1	12	−3	0	F
(Mexico) Santiago Sierra	6	4	8	12	+13	29	F
(Bulgaria) Martin Boyadjiev	6	10	1	11	+5	2	F
(Mexico) Marin Ramos	6	6	5	11	+11	12	F
(New Zealand) Hayden Argyle	6	7	2	9	+8	26	D
