= 2010 IIHF World U18 Championship Division II =

Tournament details
- Host countries: Estonia; Ukraine
- Venue(s): 2 (in 2 host cities)
- Dates: 13–19 March 2010; 22–28 March 2010
- Teams: 12

The 2010 IIHF World U18 Championship Division II was an international under-18 ice hockey competition organised by the International Ice Hockey Federation. Both Division II tournaments made up the third level of the IIHF World U18 Championships. The Group A tournament was played in Narva, Estonia, and the Group B tournament was played in Kyiv, Ukraine. Italy and Slovenia won the Group A and B tournaments respectively and gained promotion to the Division I of the 2011 IIHF World U18 Championships.

== Group A ==
The Group A tournament was played in Narva, Estonia, from 13 to 19 March 2010.

=== Final standings ===
Pos	Team	Pld	W	OTW	OTL	L	GF	GA	GD	Pts	Promotion or relegation
1	Italy	5	5	0	0	0	55	3	+52	15	Promoted to the 2011 Division I
2	Romania	5	3	0	1	1	22	23	−1	10	
3	Croatia	5	1	3	0	1	20	16	+4	9	
4	Serbia	5	1	0	1	3	11	19	−8	4	
5	Estonia	5	1	0	1	3	17	32	−15	4	
6	Iceland	5	1	0	0	4	12	44	−32	3	Relegated to the 2011 Division III

Source: IIHF

=== Results ===
All times are local (EET - UTC+02:00).

13 March 2010; 13:00	Iceland	2–9 (1–2, 0–6, 1–1)	Croatia	Kreenholm Ice Hall, Narva

Game reference

13 March 2010; 16:30	Romania	0–11 (0–6, 0–3, 0–2)	Italy	Kreenholm Ice Hall, Narva

Game reference

13 March 2010; 20:00	Estonia	0–3 (0–2, 0–0, 0–1)	Serbia	Kreenholm Ice Hall, Narva

Game reference

14 March 2010; 13:00	Italy	6–0 (1–0, 2–0, 3–0)	Croatia	Kreenholm Ice Hall, Narva

Game reference

14 March 2010; 16:30	Serbia	2–4 (1–0, 1–3, 0–1)	Iceland	Kreenholm Ice Hall, Narva

Game reference

14 March 2010; 20:00	Estonia	4–10 (2–4, 1–4, 1–2)	Romania	Kreenholm Ice Hall, Narva

Game reference

16 March 2010; 13:00	Italy	9–2 (6–0, 1–0, 2–2)	Serbia	Kreenholm Ice Hall, Narva

Game reference

16 March 2010; 16:30	Romania	3–4 GWS (0–0, 2–1, 1–2) (0–0, 0–1)	Croatia	Kreenholm Ice Hall, Narva

Game reference

16 March 2010; 20:00	Estonia	10–3 (4–2, 3–1, 3–0)	Iceland	Kreenholm Ice Hall, Narva

Game reference

17 March 2010; 13:00	Serbia	1–2 (0–0, 0–1, 1–1)	Romania	Kreenholm Ice Hall, Narva

Game reference

17 March 2010; 16:30	Iceland	0–16 (0–4, 0–7, 0–5)	Italy	Kreenholm Ice Hall, Narva

Game reference

17 March 2010; 20:00	Croatia	3–2 GWS (1–1, 1–1, 0–0) ( 0–0, 1–0)	Estonia	Kreenholm Ice Hall, Narva

Game reference

19 March 2010; 13:00	Romania	7–3 (2–1, 2–1, 3–1)	Iceland	Kreenholm Ice Hall, Narva

Game reference

19 March 2010; 16:30	Croatia	4–3 GWS (1–0, 1–1, 1–2) (0–0, 1–0)	Serbia	Kreenholm Ice Hall, Narva

Game reference

19 March 2010; 20:00	Italy	13–1 (6–1, 7–0, 0–0)	Estonia	Kreenholm Ice Hall, Narva

Game reference

== Group B ==
The Group B tournament was played in Kyiv, Ukraine, from 22 to 28 March 2010.

=== Final standings ===
Pos	Team	Pld	W	OTW	OTL	L	GF	GA	GD	Pts	Promotion or relegation
1	Slovenia	5	5	0	0	0	63	4	+59	15	Promoted to the 2011 Division I
2	Ukraine	5	4	0	0	1	26	3	+23	12	
3	Spain	5	2	1	0	2	17	22	−5	8	
4	Netherlands	5	2	0	1	2	14	27	−13	7	
5	Belgium	5	0	1	0	4	7	41	−34	2	
6	Australia	5	0	0	1	4	7	37	−30	1	Relegated to the 2011 Division III

Source: IIHF

=== Results ===
All times are local (EET - UTC+02:00) / 28.03.2010 (EEST - UTC+03:00).

22 March 2010; 13:00	Australia	1–5 (1–0, 0–1, 0–4)	Netherlands	Terminal Arena, Kyiv

Game reference

22 March 2010; 16:30	Slovenia	9–2 (2–0, 4–1, 3–1)	Spain	Terminal Arena, Kyiv

Game reference

22 March 2010; 20:00	Belgium	0–8 (0–3, 0–2, 0–3)	Ukraine	Terminal Arena, Kyiv

Game reference

23 March 2010; 15:00	Spain	6–3 (1–1, 3–1, 2–1)	Australia	Terminal Arena, Kyiv

Game reference

23 March 2010; 18:30	Slovenia	19–0 (6–0, 7–0, 6–0)	Belgium	Terminal Arena, Kyiv

Game reference

24 March 2010; 18:30	Ukraine	7–0 (1–0, 3–0, 3–0)	Netherlands	Terminal Arena, Kyiv

Game reference

25 March 2010; 13:00	Slovenia	19–0 (9–0, 5–0, 5–0)	Australia	Terminal Arena, Kyiv

Game reference

25 March 2010; 16:30	Belgium	2–6 (2–2, 0–3, 0–1)	Netherlands	Terminal Arena, Kyiv

Game reference

25 March 2010; 20:00	Ukraine	7–1 (2–0, 2–0, 3–1)	Spain	Terminal Arena, Kyiv

Game reference

26 March 2010; 18:30	Spain	5–1 (1–1, 2–0, 2–0)	Belgium	Terminal Arena, Kyiv

Game reference

27 March 2010; 15:00	Netherlands	1–14 (0–5, 1–4, 0–5)	Slovenia	Terminal Arena, Kyiv

Game reference

27 March 2010; 18:30	Australia	0–3 (0–1, 0–0, 0–2)	Ukraine	Terminal Arena, Kyiv

Game reference

28 March 2010; 12:00	Netherlands	2–3 OT (1–1, 1–1, 0–0) (0–1)	Spain	Terminal Arena, Kyiv

Game reference

28 March 2010; 15:30	Belgium	4–3 OT (0–1, 1–2, 2–0) (1–0)	Australia	Terminal Arena, Kyiv

Game reference

28 March 2010; 19:00	Ukraine	1–2 (0–2, 0–0, 1–0)	Slovenia	Terminal Arena, Kyiv

Game reference

== See also ==
- 2010 IIHF World U18 Championships
- 2010 IIHF World U18 Championship Division I
- 2010 IIHF World U18 Championship Division III
