= 2011 IIHF World U18 Championship Division III =

Tournament details
- Host countries: Taiwan; Mexico
- Venues: 2 (in 2 host cities)
- Dates: 11–17 April 2011; 13–20 March 2011
- Teams: 9

The 2011 IIHF World U18 Championship Division III was an international under-18 ice hockey competition organised by the International Ice Hockey Federation. Both Division III tournaments made up the fourth level of the IIHF World U18 Championships. The Group A tournament was played in Taipei, Taiwan, and the Group B tournament was played in Mexico City, Mexico. Australia and Iceland won the Group A and B tournaments respectively and gained promotion to the Division II of the 2012 IIHF World U18 Championships.

== Group A ==
The Group A tournament was played in Taipei, Taiwan, from 11 to 17 April 2011. Prior to the start of the tournament, the Mongolian national team announced they would withdraw, citing financial reasons. Group A played a round-robin schedule followed by a classification round.

=== Group standings ===
| Pos | Team | Pld | W | OTW | OTL | L | GF | GA | GD | Pts | Qualification |
|---|---|---|---|---|---|---|---|---|---|---|---|
| 1 | Australia | 3 | 3 | 0 | 0 | 0 | 29 | 2 | +27 | 9 | Semifinals |
| 2 | Bulgaria | 3 | 2 | 0 | 0 | 1 | 16 | 11 | +5 | 6 | Semifinals |
| 3 | Chinese Taipei | 3 | 1 | 0 | 0 | 2 | 12 | 11 | +1 | 3 | Semifinals |
| 4 | Turkey | 3 | 0 | 0 | 0 | 3 | 4 | 37 | −33 | 0 | Semifinals |

Source: IIHF

=== Results ===
All times are local (Taipei Time/UTC+8).

| 11 April 2011; 15:30 | Turkey | 2–11 (0–2, 2–5, 0–4) | Bulgaria | Annex Ice Rink, Taipei |

Game reference

| 11 April 2011; 19:30 | Chinese Taipei | 1–5 (0–1, 0–0, 1–4) | Australia | Annex Ice Rink, Taipei |

Game reference

| 12 April 2011; 15:30 | Turkey | 2–9 (2–4, 0–4, 0–1) | Chinese Taipei | Annex Ice Rink, Taipei |

Game reference

| 12 April 2011; 19:00 | Australia | 7–1 (3–0, 3–1, 1–0) | Bulgaria | Annex Ice Rink, Taipei |

Game reference

| 14 April 2011; 15:30 | Australia | 17–0 (7–0, 6–0, 4–0) | Turkey | Annex Ice Rink, Taipei |

Game reference

| 14 April 2011; 19:00 | Bulgaria | 4–2 (1–0, 1–1, 2–1) | Chinese Taipei | Annex Ice Rink, Taipei |

Game reference

=== Playoffs ===
Semifinals
1 | Australia | 12
4 | Turkey | 1
2 | Bulgaria | 5
3 | Chinese Taipei | 6

Final
1 | Australia | 6
3 | Chinese Taipei | 2
Third place match
2 | Bulgaria | 4
4 | Turkey | 2

==== Semifinals ====
| 15 April 2011; 15:30 | Australia | 12–1 (4–0, 3–0, 5–1) | Turkey | Annex Ice Rink, Taipei |

Game reference

| 15 April 2011; 19:00 | Bulgaria | 5–6 (2–3, 3–0, 0–3) | Chinese Taipei | Annex Ice Rink, Taipei |

Game reference

==== Third place match ====
| 17 April 2011; 13:30 | Bulgaria | 4–2 (1–2, 2–0, 1–0) | Turkey | Annex Ice Rink, Taipei |

Game reference

==== Final ====
| 17 April 2011; 17:00 | Australia | 6–2 (0–0, 5–0, 1–2) | Chinese Taipei | Annex Ice Rink, Taipei |

Game reference

== Group B ==
The Group B tournament was played in Mexico City, Mexico, from 13 to 20 March 2011.

=== Final standings ===
| Pos | Team | Pld | W | OTW | OTL | L | GF | GA | GD | Pts | Promotion |
|---|---|---|---|---|---|---|---|---|---|---|---|
| 1 | Iceland | 4 | 3 | 1 | 0 | 0 | 52 | 5 | +47 | 11 | Promoted to the 2012 Division II |
| 2 | Mexico | 4 | 3 | 0 | 1 | 0 | 30 | 8 | +22 | 10 | |
| 3 | South Africa | 4 | 2 | 0 | 0 | 2 | 19 | 25 | −6 | 6 | |
| 4 | Israel | 4 | 1 | 0 | 0 | 3 | 17 | 24 | −7 | 3 | |
| 5 | Ireland | 4 | 0 | 0 | 0 | 4 | 3 | 59 | −56 | 0 | |

Source: IIHF

=== Results ===
All times are local (Central Time Zone/UTC−6).

| 13 March 2011; 16:00 | Ireland | 1–13 (0–4, 1–5, 0–4) | South Africa | Lomas Verdes Rink, Mexico City |

Game reference

| 13 March 2011; 20:00 | Israel | 3–7 (3–2, 0–3, 0–2) | Mexico | Lomas Verdes Rink, Mexico City |

Game reference

| 14 March 2011; 16:00 | Iceland | 12–0 (4–0, 2–0, 6–0) | Israel | Lomas Verdes Rink, Mexico City |

Game reference

| 14 March 2011; 19:30 | Mexico | 12–0 (8–0, 0–0, 4–0) | Ireland | Lomas Verdes Rink, Mexico City |

Game reference

| 16 March 2011; 16:00 | Iceland | 22–0 (12–0, 5–0, 5–0) | Ireland | Lomas Verdes Rink, Mexico City |

Game reference

| 16 March 2011; 19:30 | Mexico | 8–1 (2–1, 3–0, 3–0) | South Africa | Lomas Verdes Rink, Mexico City |

Game reference

| 18 March 2011; 16:00 | South Africa | 2–14 (1–3, 0–7, 1–4) | Iceland | Lomas Verdes Rink, Mexico City |

Game reference

| 18 March 2011; 19:30 | Israel | 12–2 (10–0, 2–0, 0–2) | Ireland | Lomas Verdes Rink, Mexico City |

Game reference

| 19 March 2011; 16:00 | South Africa | 3–2 (2–1, 0–1, 1–0) | Israel | Lomas Verdes Rink, Mexico City |

Game reference

| 19 March 2011; 19:30 | Iceland | 4–3 GWS (3–1, 0–2, 0–0, 0–0, 1–0) | Mexico | Lomas Verdes Rink, Mexico City |

Game reference

== See also ==
- 2011 IIHF World U18 Championships
- 2011 IIHF World U18 Championship Division I
- 2011 IIHF World U18 Championship Division II
- List of sporting events in Taiwan
