= 2012 IIHF World U18 Championship Division III =

2012 IIHF U18 World Championship Division III

Tournament details
- Host country: Bulgaria
- Venue: 1 (in 1 host city)
- Dates: 12–18 March 2012
- Teams: 6

Tournament statistics
- Games played: 15
- Goals scored: 157 (10.47 per game)
- Scoring leader: Yoren de Smet

The 2012 IIHF U18 World Championship Division III was an international under-18 ice hockey tournament organised by the International Ice Hockey Federation. In 2012, a new format was introduced to the IIHF World U18 Championships, therefore Division III now represents the sixth tier of the IIHF World U18 Championships. The Division III tournament was played in Sofia, Bulgaria, from 12 to 18 March 2012.

== Participants ==
Team	Qualification
New Zealand	Placed 6th in 2011 Division II (Group A) and were relegated
Belgium	Placed 6th in 2011 Division II (Group B) and were relegated
Bulgaria	Hosts, placed 2nd in 2011 Division III (Group A)
Mexico	Placed 2nd in 2011 Division III (Group B)
Chinese Taipei	Placed 3rd in 2011 Division III (Group A)
South Africa	Placed 3rd in 2011 Division III (Group B)

== Final standings ==
Pos	Team	Pld	W	OTW	OTL	L	GF	GA	GD	Pts	Promotion or relegation
1	Belgium	5	5	0	0	0	48	12	+36	15	Promoted to the 2013 Division II B
2	New Zealand	5	4	0	0	1	33	13	+20	12	
3	Mexico	5	3	0	0	2	24	15	+9	9	
4	Bulgaria	5	2	0	0	3	27	23	+4	6	
5	Chinese Taipei	5	1	0	0	4	19	26	−7	3	
6	South Africa	5	0	0	0	5	6	68	−62	0	Relegated to the 2013 Division III B

Source: IIHF

== Results ==
All times are local. (Eastern European Time – UTC+2)

12 March 2012; 12:00	Mexico	2–5 (1–1, 0–0, 1–4)	Belgium	Winter Sports Palace, Sofia

Game reference

12 March 2012; 15:30	South Africa	0–11 (0–6, 0–2, 0–3)	Chinese Taipei	Winter Sports Palace, Sofia

Game reference

12 March 2012; 19:00	New Zealand	5–2 (1–0, 1–1, 3–1)	Bulgaria	Winter Sports Palace, Sofia

Game reference

13 March 2012; 12:00	Belgium	9–1 (1–0, 5–0, 3–1)	Chinese Taipei	Winter Sports Palace, Sofia

Game reference

13 March 2012; 15:30	New Zealand	3–2 (0–1, 2–1, 1–0)	Mexico	Winter Sports Palace, Sofia

Game reference

13 March 2012; 19:00	Bulgaria	13–1 (6–0, 5–0, 2–1)	South Africa	Winter Sports Palace, Sofia

Game reference

15 March 2012; 12:00	New Zealand	18–0 (6–0, 6–0, 6–0)	South Africa	Winter Sports Palace, Sofia

Game reference

15 March 2012; 15:30	Mexico	7–2 (5–0, 0–1, 2–1)	Chinese Taipei	Winter Sports Palace, Sofia

Game reference

15 March 2012; 19:00	Belgium	9–5 (2–3, 3–2, 4–0)	Bulgaria	Winter Sports Palace, Sofia

Game reference

16 March 2012; 12:00	Chinese Taipei	1–4 (0–1, 1–3, 0–0)	New Zealand	Winter Sports Palace, Sofia

Game reference

16 March 2012; 15:30	South Africa	1–17 (0–5, 1–4, 0–8)	Belgium	Winter Sports Palace, Sofia

Game reference

16 March 2012; 19:00	Bulgaria	1–4 (0–1, 1–2, 0–1)	Mexico	Winter Sports Palace, Sofia

Game reference

18 March 2012; 12:00	Mexico	9–4 (1–1, 5–1, 3–2)	South Africa	Winter Sports Palace, Sofia

Game reference

18 March 2012; 15:30	Chinese Taipei	4–6 (0–1, 2–3, 2–2)	Bulgaria	Winter Sports Palace, Sofia

Game reference

18 March 2012; 19:00	Belgium	8–3 (2–1, 5–0, 1–2)	New Zealand	Winter Sports Palace, Sofia

Game reference
