= Jonathan Racine =

Canadian ice hockey player (born 1993)

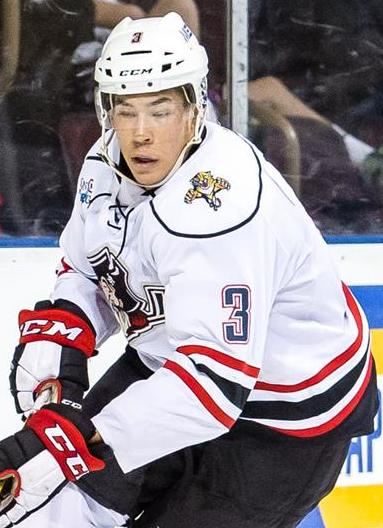
- Racine with the Portland Pirates in 2015
- Born: May 28, 1993 (age 33) Montreal, Quebec, Canada
- Height: 6 ft 2 in (188 cm)
- Weight: 202 lb (92 kg; 14 st 6 lb)
- Position: Defence
- Shoots: Left
- Allsv team Former teams: HC Vita Hästen; Florida Panthers; Tappara; HC TWK Innsbruck
- NHL draft: 87th overall, 2011; Florida Panthers
- Playing career: 2013–present

Jonathan Racine (born May 28, 1993) is a Canadian professional ice hockey defenceman who is currently playing with Guildford Flames in the United Kingdom’s Elite Ice Hockey League. Racine was selected by the Florida Panthers in the third round (87th overall) of the 2011 NHL entry draft.

== Playing career ==
On April 3, 2013, the Florida Panthers of the NHL signed Racine a three-year entry-level contract and he began his professional career in the American Hockey League (AHL) with the San Antonio Rampage.

On April 1, 2014, Racine was recalled to the Florida Panthers where he skated 15:35 in his NHL debut against the New York Islanders before being returned the following day to San Antonio.

Prior to the 2016–17 season, Racine was traded by the Panthers to the Montreal Canadiens in exchange for Tim Bozon on October 8, 2016. He was immediately assigned to begin the year with AHL affiliate, the St. John's IceCaps. He appeared in just 26 games with the IceCaps for 3 assists, before he was traded again, along with a 6th round pick in the 2017 NHL entry draft to the Tampa Bay Lightning for defenseman Nikita Nesterov on January 26, 2017. Racine was assigned to play out the remainder of the season with the Lightning's AHL affiliate, the Syracuse Crunch.

As a free agent from the Lightning, Racine received limited NHL interest. On September 27, 2017, he was announced to have signed an AHL professional try-out contract to attend the Ontario Reign training camp. He was later revealed to have signed an AHL contract with the Reign upon his reassignment to the Manchester Monarchs of the ECHL on October 1, 2017.

Approaching his sixth full professional season in 2018–19, Racine opted to continue his career in signing a one-year ECHL contract with the Brampton Beast on October 4, 2018. He was later loaned to AHL affiliate, the Belleville Senators and later signed to a AHL contract for the remainder of the season on November 6, 2018. He made 9 appearances with Belleville, contributing with 1 goal.

As a free agent from the Senators, Racine opted to continue his career in the ECHL, agreeing to terms with the Maine Mariners on October 1, 2019. He was loaned to the AHL, signing a professional try-out with the Stockton Heat, affiliate to the Calgary Flames on December 10, 2019.

After 7 games with the Heat, Racine left the team and North America, agreeing to a contract for the remainder of the season with Finnish club, Tappara of the Liiga on February 15, 2020.

After spending the 2020–21 season in Austria with HC TWK Innsbruck of the ICE Hockey League, Racine continued his European career by agreeing to a one-year contract with Swedish second division club, HC Vita Hästen of the HockeyAllsvenskan, on June 11, 2021.

== Career statistics ==
=== Regular season and playoffs ===
			Regular season					Playoffs
Season	Team	League	GP	G	A	Pts	PIM	GP	G	A	Pts	PIM
2009–10	Shawinigan Cataractes	QMJHL	55	0	4	4	43	6	0	0	0	0
2010–11	Shawinigan Cataractes	QMJHL	68	2	5	7	86	12	0	1	1	22
2011–12	Shawinigan Cataractes	QMJHL	61	3	10	13	107	11	1	5	6	22
2012–13	Moncton Wildcats	QMJHL	61	8	13	21	138	5	0	0	0	7
2012–13	San Antonio Rampage	AHL	8	0	0	0	4	—	—	—	—	—
2013–14	San Antonio Rampage	AHL	51	0	6	6	91	—	—	—	—	—
2013–14	Florida Panthers	NHL	1	0	0	0	2	—	—	—	—	—
2014–15	San Antonio Rampage	AHL	70	0	7	7	149	3	0	1	1	4
2015–16	Portland Pirates	AHL	69	1	8	9	89	5	0	0	0	4
2016–17	St. John's IceCaps	AHL	26	0	3	3	58	—	—	—	—	—
2016–17	Syracuse Crunch	AHL	29	1	2	3	78	5	1	1	2	2
2017–18	Manchester Monarchs	ECHL	20	1	3	4	41	—	—	—	—	—
2017–18	Ontario Reign	AHL	6	0	0	0	22	—	—	—	—	—
2018–19	Brampton Beast	ECHL	44	7	13	20	103	6	1	2	3	39
2018–19	Belleville Senators	AHL	9	1	0	1	13	—	—	—	—	—
2019–20	Maine Mariners	ECHL	15	0	6	6	35	—	—	—	—	—
2019–20	Stockton Heat	AHL	7	0	0	0	11	—	—	—	—	—
2019–20	Tappara	Liiga	5	0	1	1	2	—	—	—	—	—
2020–21	HC TWK Innsbruck	ICEHL	44	4	13	17	70	—	—	—	—	—
2021–22	HC Vita Hästen	Allsv	42	1	8	9	46	—	—	—	—	—
2022–23	Herning Blue Fox	Denmark	16	0	5	5	10	—	—	—	—	—
NHL totals			1	0	0	0	2	—	—	—	—	—

=== International ===
Year	Team	Event	Result	GP	G	A	Pts	PIM
2010	Canada Quebec	U17	6th	5	0	0	0	4
Junior totals				5	0	0	0	4
