= 2014 IIHF World U18 Championship Division III =

2014 IIHF U18 World Championship Division III

Tournament details
- Host countries: Bulgaria; Turkey
- Venues: 2 (in 2 host cities)
- Dates: 24–30 March 2014; 13–15 February 2014
- Teams: 9

The 2014 IIHF U18 World Championship Division III was two international under-18 ice hockey tournaments organised by the International Ice Hockey Federation. The Division III A and Division III B tournaments represent the sixth and the seventh tier of the IIHF World U18 Championship.

== Division III A ==
The Division III A tournament was played in Sofia, Bulgaria, from 24 to 30 March 2014.

=== Participants ===
Team	Qualification
Australia	placed 6th in 2013 Division II B and were relegated
New Zealand	placed 2nd in 2013 Division III A
Chinese Taipei	placed 3rd in 2013 Division III A
Bulgaria	hosts, placed 4th in 2013 Division III A
Mexico	placed 5th in 2013 Division III A
Israel	placed 1st in 2013 Division III B and were promoted

=== Final standings ===
Pos	Team	Pld	W	OTW	OTL	L	GF	GA	GD	Pts	Promotion or relegation
1	Australia	5	4	0	0	1	14	6	+8	12	Promoted to the 2015 Division II B
2	Israel	5	3	0	0	2	25	15	+10	9	
3	Chinese Taipei	5	2	1	0	2	12	13	−1	8	
4	Bulgaria	5	2	0	0	3	11	17	−6	6	
5	Mexico	5	2	0	0	3	13	10	+3	6	
6	New Zealand	5	1	0	1	3	9	23	−14	4	Relegated to the 2015 Division III B

Source: IIHF

=== Results ===
All times are local. (Eastern European Time – UTC+2 / 30 March 2014: Eastern European Summer Time – UTC+3)

24 March 2014; 13:00	New Zealand	2–7 (0–0, 1–6, 1–1)	Israel	Winter Sports Palace, Sofia

Game reference

24 March 2014; 16:30	Chinese Taipei	1–2 (0–0, 0–2, 1–0)	Australia	Winter Sports Palace, Sofia

Game reference

24 March 2014; 20:00	Mexico	2–3 (0–1, 1–0, 1–2)	Bulgaria	Winter Sports Palace, Sofia

Game reference

25 March 2014; 13:00	New Zealand	2–3 GWS (0–1, 0–0, 2–1) (0–0, 0–1)	Chinese Taipei	Winter Sports Palace, Sofia

Game reference

25 March 2014; 16:30	Israel	2–5 (0–1, 1–3, 1–1)	Mexico	Winter Sports Palace, Sofia

Game reference

25 March 2014; 20:00	Australia	0–1 (0–0, 0–0, 0–1)	Bulgaria	Winter Sports Palace, Sofia

Game reference

27 March 2014; 13:00	Australia	3–2 (2–1, 0–0, 1–1)	Israel	Winter Sports Palace, Sofia

Game reference

27 March 2014; 16:30	New Zealand	0–3 (0–1, 0–0, 0–2)	Mexico	Winter Sports Palace, Sofia

Game reference

27 March 2014; 20:00	Chinese Taipei	3–1 (0–1, 0–0, 3–0)	Bulgaria	Winter Sports Palace, Sofia

Game reference

28 March 2014; 13:00	Mexico	2–3 (0–1, 1–2, 1–0)	Australia	Winter Sports Palace, Sofia

Game reference

28 March 2014; 16:30	Israel	7–3 (1–2, 1–0, 5–1)	Chinese Taipei	Winter Sports Palace, Sofia

Game reference

28 March 2014; 20:00	Bulgaria	4–5 (2–2, 1–1, 1–2)	New Zealand	Winter Sports Palace, Sofia

Game reference

30 March 2014; 13:00	Chinese Taipei	2–1 (00–, 0–1, 2–0)	Mexico	Winter Sports Palace, Sofia

Game reference

30 March 2014; 16:30	Bulgaria	2–7 (1–3, 0–2, 1–2)	Israel	Winter Sports Palace, Sofia

Game reference

30 March 2014; 20:00	Australia	6–0 (3–0, 3–0, 0–0)	New Zealand	Winter Sports Palace, Sofia

Game reference

== Division III B ==
The Division III B tournament was played in İzmit, Turkey, from 13 to 15 February 2014.

=== Participants ===
Team	Qualification
South Africa	placed 2nd in 2013 Division III B
Turkey	hosts, placed 3rd in 2013 Division III B
Hong Kong	(first U18 WCh participation ever)

=== Final standings ===
Pos	Team	Pld	W	OTW	OTL	L	GF	GA	GD	Pts	Promotion
1	South Africa	2	2	0	0	0	10	4	+6	6	Promoted to the 2015 Division III A
2	Turkey	2	1	0	0	1	6	4	+2	3	
3	Hong Kong	2	0	0	0	2	5	13	−8	0	

Source: IIHF

=== Results ===
All times are local. (Eastern European Time – UTC+2)

13 February 2014; 19:00	Turkey	5–2 (2–0, 0–1, 3–1)	Hong Kong	K.B.B. Ice Arena, İzmit

Game reference

14 February 2014; 15:00	Hong Kong	3–8 (1–1, 2–3, 0–4)	South Africa	K.B.B. Ice Arena, İzmit

Game reference

15 February 2014; 15:00	South Africa	2–1 (0–0, 0–1, 2–0)	Turkey	K.B.B. Ice Arena, İzmit

Game reference
