= New Zealand men's national under-18 ice hockey team =

The New Zealand men's national under-18 ice hockey team is the men's national under-18 ice hockey team of New Zealand. The team is controlled by the New Zealand Ice Hockey Federation, a member of the International Ice Hockey Federation. The team represents New Zealand at the IIHF World U18 Championships.

== International competitions ==
=== IIHF Asian Oceanic U18 Championships ===
- 1998: 5th place
- 1999: 3rd in Division II
- 2000: 1st in Division II
- 2001: 4th place
- 2002: (bronze) 3rd place

=== IIHF World U18 Championships ===
- 2003: 4th in Division III Group A
- 2004: 3rd in Division III
- 2005: 4th in Division III
- 2006: 4th in Division III
- 2007: 4th in Division III
- 2008: 3rd in Division III Group A
- 2009: 2nd in Division III Group A
- 2010: 1st in Division III Group B
- 2011: 6th in Division II Group A
- 2012: 2nd in Division III
- 2013: 2nd in Division III Group A
- 2014: 6th in Division III Group A
- 2015: 2nd in Division III Group B
- 2016: 1st in Division III Group B
- 2017: 6th in Division III Group A
- 2018: 1st in Division III Group B
- 2019: 6th in Division III Group A
- 2020: Cancelled due to the COVID-19 pandemic
- 2021: Cancelled due to the COVID-19 pandemic
- 2022: Withdrawn
- 2023: 1st in Division III Group B
- 2024: 5th in Division III Group A
- 2025: 5th in Division III Group A
- 2026: 6th in Division III Group A
