= Palandöken Ice Skating Hall =

Ice hockey venue in Erzurum, Turkey

- Interactive map of Palandöken Ice Skating Hall
- Full name: Palandöken Buz Pateni Salonu
- Former names: GSIM Yenişehir Ice Hockey Hall; Erzurum Ice Skating Hall
- Location: Ebu İshak Cad., Hacı Ahmet Baba Mah., Palandöken, Erzurum, Turkey
- Coordinates: 39.88732°N 41.25761°E
- Owner: Erzurum Youth and Sport Directorate (GSİM)
- Capacity: 2,000

Construction
- Opened: 2008

Website
- erzurum.gsb.gov.tr

Palandöken Ice Skating Hall (Turkish: Palandöken Buz Pateni Salonu), formerly GSIM Yenişehir Ice Hockey Hall (Turkish: GSİM Yenişehir Buz Hokey Salonu) or Erzurum Ice Skating Hall (Turkish: Erzurum Buz Pateni Salonu), is an indoor ice skating and ice hockey rink located at Ahmet Baba neighborhood of Palandöken district in Erzurum, eastern Turkey. It was opened in 2008.

Owned by the Youth and Sport Directorate of Erzurum Province (GSIM), the venue has a seating capacity of 2,000 spectators. The rink hosts also figure skating and short track speed skating events in addition to ice hockey games.

== International events hosted ==
- 11th World Ice Hockey U18 Championships-Division III – Group B Tournament – March 9–15, 2009.
- 12th World Ice Hockey U18 Championships-Division III – Group A Tournament – March 8–14, 2010.
- 25th Winter Universiade – Figure skating – February 1–5, 2011.
- 2017 European Youth Olympic Winter Festival – February 12–17, 2017

== See also ==
- Erzurum GSIM Ice Arena
