= Radzim =

Radzim may refer to the following places in Poland:

- Radzim, a former fortress near Starczanowo, Poznań County (west-central Poland)
- Radzim, Kuyavian-Pomeranian Voivodeship (north-central Poland)
- Radzim, West Pomeranian Voivodeship (north-west Poland)

== See also ==
- Radim (disambiguation)
