= Radim =

Radim may refer to:

== Places in the Czech Republic ==
- Radim (Jičín District), a municipality and village in the Hradec Králové Region
- Radim (Kolín District), a municipality and village in the Central Bohemian Region
- Radim, a village and part of Brantice in the Moravian-Silesian Region
- Radim, a village and part of Luže (Chrudim District) in the Pardubice Region

== Names ==
- Radim (given name), Slavic origin male given name
