= 2011 IIHF World U18 Championship Division II =

Tournament details
- Host countries: Romania; Ukraine
- Venue(s): 2 (in 2 host cities)
- Dates: 19–25 March 2011; 27 March – 2 April 2011
- Teams: 12

The 2011 IIHF World U18 Championship Division II was an international under-18 ice hockey competition organised by the International Ice Hockey Federation. Both Division II tournaments made up the third level of the IIHF World U18 Championships. The Group A tournament was played in Braşov, Romania, and the Group B tournament was played in Donetsk, Ukraine. Austria and Ukraine won the Group A and B tournaments respectively and gained promotion to the Division I of the 2012 IIHF World U18 Championships.

== Group A ==
The Group A tournament was played in Braşov, Romania, from 19 to 25 March 2011.

=== Final standings ===
Pos	Team	Pld	W	OTW	OTL	L	GF	GA	GD	Pts	Promotion or relegation
1	Austria	5	5	0	0	0	56	3	+53	15	Promoted to the 2012 Division I
2	Romania	5	3	1	0	1	26	12	+14	11	
3	Croatia	5	3	0	1	1	28	9	+19	10	
4	Estonia	5	2	0	0	3	33	25	+8	6	
5	Serbia	5	1	0	0	4	6	43	−37	3	
6	New Zealand	5	0	0	0	5	1	58	−57	0	Relegated to the 2012 Division III

Source: IIHF

=== Results ===
All times are local (EET – UTC+02:00).

19 March 2011; 13:00	New Zealand	1–4 (0–1, 1–2, 0–1)	Serbia	Braşov Arena, Braşov

Game reference

19 March 2011; 16:30	Croatia	1–5 (1–4, 0–1, 0–0)	Austria	Braşov Arena, Braşov

Game reference

19 March 2011; 20:00	Romania	8–1 (2–1, 3–0, 3–0)	Estonia	Braşov Arena, Braşov

Game reference

20 March 2011; 13:00	Austria	12–0 (2–0, 6–0, 4–0)	Serbia	Braşov Arena, Braşov

Game reference

20 March 2011; 16:30	Estonia	14–0 (5–0, 2–0, 7–0)	New Zealand	Braşov Arena, Braşov

Game reference

20 March 2011; 20:00	Romania	3–2 (GWS) (1–0, 1–1, 0–1, 0–0, 1–0)	Croatia	Braşov Arena, Braşov

Game reference

22 March 2011; 13:00	Austria	10–0 (5–0, 4–0, 1–0)	Estonia	Braşov Arena, Braşov

Game reference

22 March 2011; 16:30	Croatia	7–0 (2–0, 4–0, 1–0)	Serbia	Braşov Arena, Braşov

Game reference

22 March 2011; 20:00	Romania	7–0 (2–0, 2–0, 3–0)	New Zealand	Braşov Arena, Braşov

Game reference

23 March 2011; 13:00	Estonia	1–6 (1–2, 0–2, 0–2)	Croatia	Braşov Arena, Braşov

Game reference

23 March 2011; 16:30	New Zealand	0–21 (0–7, 0–6, 0–8)	Austria	Braşov Arena, Braşov

Game reference

23 March 2011; 20:00	Serbia	1–6 (0–2, 0–2, 1–2)	Romania	Braşov Arena, Braşov

Game reference

25 March 2011; 13:00	Croatia	12–0 (2–0, 5–0, 5–0)	New Zealand	Braşov Arena, Braşov

Game reference

25 March 2011; 16:30	Serbia	1–17 (1–7, 0–5, 0–5)	Estonia	Braşov Arena, Braşov

Game reference

25 March 2011; 20:00	Austria	8–2 (4–0, 3–1, 1–1)	Romania	Braşov Arena, Braşov

Game reference

== Group B ==
The Group B tournament was played in Donetsk, Ukraine, from 27 March to 2 April 2011.

=== Final standings ===
Pos	Team	Pld	W	OTW	OTL	L	GF	GA	GD	Pts	Promotion or relegation
1	Ukraine	5	5	0	0	0	51	7	+44	15	Promoted to the 2012 Division I
2	Netherlands	5	3	1	0	1	19	11	+8	11	
3	Lithuania	5	3	0	0	2	44	15	+29	9	
4	Spain	5	2	0	1	2	19	21	−2	7	
5	China	5	1	0	0	4	13	47	−34	3	
6	Belgium	5	0	0	0	5	8	53	−45	0	Relegated to the 2012 Division III

Source: IIHF

=== Results ===
All times are local (EEST – UTC+03:00).

27 March 2011; 13:00	China	1–2 (0–1, 0–0, 1–1)	Netherlands	Druzhba Palace of Sports, Donetsk

Game reference

27 March 2011; 16:30	Spain	3–5 (0–2, 1–2, 2–1)	Lithuania	Druzhba Palace of Sports, Donetsk

Game reference

27 March 2011; 20:00	Ukraine	12–1 (2–0, 7–1, 3–0)	Belgium	Druzhba Palace of Sports, Donetsk

Game reference

28 March 2011; 13:00	Lithuania	3–4 (1–3, 2–0, 0–1)	Netherlands	Druzhba Palace of Sports, Donetsk

Game reference

28 March 2011; 16:30	Belgium	4–7 (3–3, 1–2, 0–2)	China	Druzhba Palace of Sports, Donetsk

Game reference

28 March 2011; 20:00	Ukraine	11–1 (3–1, 4–0, 4–0)	Spain	Druzhba Palace of Sports, Donetsk

Game reference

30 March 2011; 13:00	Lithuania	15–0 (8–0, 5–0, 2–0)	Belgium	Druzhba Palace of Sports, Donetsk

Game reference

30 March 2011; 16:30	Spain	1–2 (OT) (0–1, 0–0, 1–0, 0–1)	Netherlands	Druzhba Palace of Sports, Donetsk

Game reference

30 March 2011; 20:00	Ukraine	18–1 (4–0, 4–1, 10–0)	China	Druzhba Palace of Sports, Donetsk

Game reference

31 March 2011; 13:00	Belgium	1–10 (1–2, 0–6, 0–2)	Spain	Druzhba Palace of Sports, Donetsk

Game reference

31 March 2011; 16:30	China	2–19 (0–5, 0–8, 2–6)	Lithuania	Druzhba Palace of Sports, Donetsk

Game reference

31 March 2011; 20:00	Netherlands	2–4 (2–0, 0–2, 0–2)	Ukraine	Druzhba Palace of Sports, Donetsk

Game reference

2 April 2011; 12:00	Spain	4–2 (0–0, 3–0, 1–2)	China	Druzhba Palace of Sports, Donetsk

Game reference

2 April 2011; 15:30	Netherlands	9–2 (1–0, 3–2, 5–0)	Belgium	Druzhba Palace of Sports, Donetsk

Game reference

2 April 2011; 19:00	Lithuania	2–6 (0–1, 1–3, 1–2)	Ukraine	Druzhba Palace of Sports, Donetsk

Game reference

== See also ==
- 2011 IIHF World U18 Championships
- 2011 IIHF World U18 Championship Division I
- 2011 IIHF World U18 Championship Division III
