= Dan Růžička =

Czech ice hockey player

- Born: December 31, 1991 (age 33)
- Height: 5 ft 11 in (180 cm)
- Weight: 187 lb (85 kg; 13 st 5 lb)
- Position: Defence
- Shoots: Right
- Czech Extraliga team: HC Plzeň
- Playing career: 2010–present

Dan Růžička (born December 31, 1991) is a Czech professional ice hockey defenceman. He played with HC Plzeň in the Czech Extraliga during the 2010–11 Czech Extraliga season.
