= Radim Skuhrovec =

Czech ice hockey player

- Born: May 11, 1974 (age 51)
- Height: 6 ft 2 in (188 cm)
- Weight: 207 lb (94 kg; 14 st 11 lb)
- Position: Defence
- Shot: Left
- Czech Extraliga team: HC Litvínov
- Playing career: 1993–2012

Radim Skuhrovec (born May 11, 1974) was a Czech professional ice hockey defenceman. He played with HC Litvínov in the Czech Extraliga during the 2010–11 Czech Extraliga season. He wear number 44

== Career statistics ==
			Regular season					Playoffs
Season	Team	League	GP	G	A	Pts	PIM	GP	G	A	Pts	PIM
1993–94	TJ Slovan Děčín	Czech3	—	—	—	—	—	—	—	—	—	—
1994–95	HC Litvínov B	Czech3	11	2	1	3	—	—	—	—	—	—
1994–95	HC Slovan Ústí nad Labem	Czech2	—	2	2	4	—	—	—	—	—	—
1995–96	HC Slovan Ústí nad Labem	Czech2	35	2	5	7	52	—	—	—	—	—
1996–97	HC Slovan Ústí nad Labem	Czech2	43	1	2	3	—	—	—	—	—	—
1997–98	HC Slovan Ústí nad Labem	Czech3	—	—	—	—	—	—	—	—	—	—
1997–98	HC MBL Olomouc	Czech2	36	1	4	5	—	—	—	—	—	—
1998–99	SK Kadaň	Czech2	30	6	7	13	79	—	—	—	—	—
1999–00	HC Kladno	Czech	42	1	1	2	40	—	—	—	—	—
2000–01	HC Kladno	Czech	46	5	6	11	71	—	—	—	—	—
2000–01	KLH Chomutov	Czech2	1	0	1	1	0	—	—	—	—	—
2001–02	HC Kladno	Czech	35	2	1	3	67	—	—	—	—	—
2002–03	HC Kladno	Czech	38	1	12	13	109	10	1	0	1	4
2003–04	HC Chemopetrol	Czech	13	0	4	4	10	—	—	—	—	—
2003–04	HC Slovan Ústečtí Lvi	Czech2	40	1	15	16	64	8	1	2	3	37
2004–05	HC Chemopetrol	Czech	51	3	3	6	44	4	1	0	1	31
2005–06	HC Chemopetrol	Czech	45	3	8	11	46	—	—	—	—	—
2006–07	HC Chemopetrol	Czech	52	5	2	7	54	—	—	—	—	—
2007–08	HC Litvínov	Czech	52	4	2	6	74	5	0	0	0	2
2008–09	HC Litvínov	Czech	44	0	2	2	34	4	0	0	0	14
2009–10	HC Litvínov	Czech	50	0	7	7	77	2	0	0	0	0
2010–11	HC Litvínov	Czech	52	1	4	5	51	10	0	1	1	8
2011–12	HC Litvínov	Czech	47	0	0	0	18	—	—	—	—	—
Czech totals			529	24	40	64	586	25	1	1	2	55
