= 2010 IIHF World U18 Championship Division I =

Tournament details
- Host countries: Denmark; Poland
- Venues: 2 (in 2 host cities)
- Dates: 12–18 April 2010; 11–17 April 2010
- Teams: 12

The 2010 IIHF World U18 Championship Division I was an international under-18 ice hockey competition organised by the International Ice Hockey Federation. Both Division I tournaments made up the second level of the 2010 IIHF World U18 Championships. The Group A tournament was played in Herning, Denmark, and the Group B tournament was played in Krynica-Zdrój, Poland. Norway and Germany won the Group A and B tournaments respectively and gained promotion to the Top Division of the 2011 IIHF World U18 Championships.

== Group A ==
The Group A tournament was played in Herning, Denmark, from 12 to 18 April 2010.

=== Final standings ===
Pos	Team	Pld	W	OTW	OTL	L	GF	GA	GD	Pts	Promotion or relegation
1	Norway	5	4	0	0	1	33	15	+18	12	Promoted to the 2011 Top Division
2	Denmark	5	4	0	0	1	34	14	+20	12	
3	Japan	5	3	0	0	2	27	25	+2	9	
4	France	5	3	0	0	2	21	21	0	9	
5	South Korea	5	0	1	0	4	18	45	−27	2	
6	Austria	5	0	0	1	4	12	25	−13	1	Relegated to the 2011 Division II

Source: IIHF

=== Results ===
All times are local (UTC+2).

12 April 2010; 13:15	South Korea	2–10 (0–3, 0–4, 2–3)	Norway	Herning Arena

Game reference

12 April 2010; 16:45	Japan	7–5 (2–1, 4–3, 1–1)	Austria	Herning Arena

Game reference

12 April 2010; 20:15	France	4–7 (0–2, 2–2, 2–3)	Denmark	Herning Arena

Game reference

13 April 2010; 13:15	Austria	3–4 GWS (2–0, 1–2, 0–1) (0–0, 0–1)	South Korea	Herning Arena

Game reference

13 April 2010; 16:45	Norway	4–5 (1–1, 1–1, 2–3)	France	Herning Arena

Game reference

13 April 2010; 20:15	Denmark	7–1 (2–1, 3–0, 2–0)	Japan	Herning Arena

Game reference

15 April 2010; 13:15	Norway	8–3 (3–1, 2–0, 3–2)	Japan	Herning Arena

Game reference

15 April 2010; 16:45	South Korea	4–7 (0–3, 4–2, 0–2)	France	Herning Arena

Game reference

15 April 2010; 20:15	Denmark	3–1 (1–0, 2–0, 0–1)	Austria	Herning Arena

Game reference

16 April 2010; 13:15	France	0–4 (0–1, 0–1, 0–2)	Japan	Herning Arena

Game reference

16 April 2010; 16:45	Austria	1–6 (0–3, 1–3, 0–0)	Norway	Herning Arena

Game reference

16 April 2010; 20:15	Denmark	13–3 (5–1, 4–1, 4–1)	South Korea	Herning Arena

Game reference

18 April 2010; 13:15	Austria	2–5 (1–0, 1–2, 0–3)	France	Herning Arena

Game reference

18 April 2010; 16:45	Japan	12–5 (3–2, 5–2, 4–1)	South Korea	Herning Arena

Game reference

18 April 2010; 20:15	Norway	5–4 (1–1, 0–2, 4–1)	Denmark	Herning Arena

Game reference

== Group B ==
The Group B tournament was played in Krynica-Zdrój, Poland, from 11 to 17 April 2010.

=== Final standings ===
Pos	Team	Pld	W	OTW	OTL	L	GF	GA	GD	Pts	Promotion or relegation
1	Germany	5	5	0	0	0	51	2	+49	15	Promoted to the 2011 Top Division
2	Hungary	5	3	0	1	1	19	17	+2	10	
3	Poland	5	3	0	0	2	21	21	0	9	
4	Kazakhstan	5	2	0	0	3	9	16	−7	6	
5	Great Britain	5	1	1	0	3	13	24	−11	5	
6	Lithuania	5	0	0	0	5	6	39	−33	0	Relegated to the 2011 Division II

Source: IIHF

=== Results ===
All times are local (UTC+2).

11 April 2010; 13:00	Lithuania	2–7 (0–5, 1–2, 1–0)	Hungary	Krynica Ice Stadium

Game reference

11 April 2010; 16:30	Great Britain	0–9 (0–1, 0–4, 0–4)	Germany	Krynica Ice Stadium

Game reference

11 April 2010; 20:00	Kazakhstan	0–2 (0–2, 0–0, 0–0)	Poland	Krynica Ice Stadium

Game reference

12 April 2010; 13:00	Hungary	4–5 GWS (2–1, 0–1, 2–2) (0–0, 0–1)	Great Britain	Krynica Ice Stadium

Game reference

12 April 2010; 16:30	Germany	11–1 (3–1, 5–0, 3–0)	Kazakhstan	Krynica Ice Stadium

Game reference

12 April 2010; 20:00	Poland	8–1 (6–1, 0–0, 2–0)	Lithuania	Krynica Ice Stadium

Game reference

14 April 2010; 13:00	Germany	15–0 (6–0, 5–0, 4–0)	Lithuania	Krynica Ice Stadium

Game reference

14 April 2010; 16:30	Great Britain	0–1 (0–1, 0–0, 0–0)	Kazakhstan	Krynica Ice Stadium

Game reference

14 April 2010; 20:00	Poland	3–5 (1–1, 2–1, 0–3)	Hungary	Krynica Ice Stadium

Game reference

15 April 2010; 13:00	Kazakhstan	6–1 (0–0, 1–0, 5–1)	Lithuania	Krynica Ice Stadium

Game reference

15 April 2010; 16:00	Hungary	1–6 (0–2, 0–2, 1–2)	Germany	Krynica Ice Stadium

Game reference

15 April 2010; 20:00	Poland	8–5 (0–1, 2–3, 6–1)	Great Britain	Krynica Ice Stadium

Game reference

17 April 2010; 13:00	Hungary	2–1 (1–1, 1–0, 0–0)	Kazakhstan	Krynica Ice Stadium

Game reference

17 April 2010; 16:30	Lithuania	2–3 (1–1, 1–2, 0–0)	Great Britain	Krynica Ice Stadium

Game reference

17 April 2010; 20:00	Germany	10–0 (5–0, 3–0, 2–0)	Poland	Krynica Ice Stadium

Game reference

== See also ==
- 2010 IIHF World U18 Championships
- 2010 IIHF World U18 Championship Division II
- 2010 IIHF World U18 Championship Division III
