= Aiden Morris =

English cricketer (born 1993)

Personal information
- Full name: Aiden Joseph Morris
- Born: 25 April 1993 (age 33); Nottingham, Nottinghamshire, England
- Batting: Right-handed
- Bowling: Right-arm medium-fast

Domestic team information
- Years: Team
- 2012–2013: Loughborough MCCU

Career statistics
Competition	First-class
Matches	2
Runs scored	33
Batting average	11.00
100s/50s	–/–
Top score	18*
Balls bowled	162
Wickets	2
Bowling average	53.50
5 wickets in innings	–
10 wickets in match	–
Best bowling	1/47
Catches/stumpings	1/–
- Source: Cricinfo, 6 August 2020

Aiden Joseph Morris (born 25 April 1993) is an English former first-class cricketer.

Morris was born at Nottingham in April 1993. He was educated at Loughborough Grammar School, before going up to Loughborough University. While studying at Loughborough, he made two appearances in first-class cricket for Loughborough MCCU, both against Hampshire in 2012 and 2013. He scored 23 runs in his two matches, with a high score of 18 not out, in addition to taking 2 wickets with right-arm medium-fast bowling.
