= Radim Heřman =

Czech ice hockey player

- Born: April 13, 1991 (age 33)
- Height: 6 ft 1 in (185 cm)
- Weight: 187 lb (85 kg; 13 st 5 lb)
- Position: Forward
- Shoots: Right
- team Former teams: Free agent HC České Budějovice
- Playing career: 2010–present

Radim Heřman (born April 13, 1991) is a Czech professional ice hockey forward. He is currently a free agent having last played for HC Tábor of the Czech 2.liga.

Heřman played two games with HC České Budějovice in the Czech Extraliga during the 2010–11 season.
