= 2011 IIHF World U18 Championship Division I =

Tournament details
- Host countries: Latvia; Slovenia
- Venue(s): 2 (in 2 host cities)
- Dates: 11–17 April 2011; 10–16 April 2011
- Teams: 11

The 2011 IIHF World U18 Championship Division I was an international under-18 ice hockey competition organised by the International Ice Hockey Federation. Both Division I tournaments made up the second level of the 2011 IIHF World U18 Championships. The Group A tournament was played in Riga, Latvia, and the Group B tournament was played in Maribor, Slovenia. On 29 March 2011, Japan withdrew from the tournament due to the 2011 Japan earthquake. Latvia and Denmark won the Group A and B tournaments respectively and gained promotion to the Top Division of the 2012 IIHF World U18 Championships.

== Group A ==
The Group A tournament was played in Riga, Latvia, from 11 to 17 April 2011.

=== Final standings ===
Pos	Team	Pld	W	OTW	OTL	L	GF	GA	GD	Pts	Promotion or relegation
1	Latvia	4	4	0	0	0	21	2	+19	12	Promoted to the 2012 Top Division
2	Italy	4	3	0	0	1	16	9	+7	9	
3	Kazakhstan	4	1	1	0	2	12	19	−7	5	
4	Hungary	4	1	0	1	2	10	16	−6	4	
5	Great Britain	4	0	0	0	4	12	25	−13	0	Relegated to the 2012 Division II
–	Japan (Note: Japan withdrew before the tournament due to the 2011 Tōhoku earthquake and tsunami.)	0	0	0	0	0	0	0	0	0	Withdrawn

Source: IIHF

=== Results ===
All times are local (EEST/UTC+3).

11 April 2011; 16:30	Kazakhstan	3–2 (OT) (0–1, 1–1, 1–0, 1–0)	Hungary	Arena Riga, Riga

Game reference

11 April 2011; 20:00	Italy	0–3 (0–0, 0–2, 0–1)	Latvia	Arena Riga, Riga

Game reference

12 April 2011; 16:30	Hungary	7–3 (3–0, 2–1, 2–2)	Great Britain	Arena Riga, Riga

Game reference

12 April 2011; 20:00	Latvia	8–1 (3–0, 1–0, 4–1)	Kazakhstan	Arena Riga, Riga

Game reference

14 April 2011; 16:30	Italy	4–2 (2–0, 1–1, 1–1)	Kazakhstan	Arena Riga, Riga

Game reference

14 April 2011; 20:00	Latvia	5–1 (1–0, 3–0, 1–1)	Great Britain	Arena Riga, Riga

Game reference

15 April 2011; 16:30	Hungary	1–5 (0–1, 1–2, 0–2)	Italy	Arena Riga, Riga

Game reference

15 April 2011; 20:00	Kazakhstan	6–5 (0–3, 1–1, 5–1)	Great Britain	Arena Riga, Riga

Game reference

17 April 2011; 16:30	Great Britain	3–7 (0–5, 2–1, 1–1)	Italy	Arena Riga, Riga

Game reference

17 April 2011; 20:00	Latvia	5–0 (3–0, 1–0, 1–0)	Hungary	Arena Riga, Riga

Game reference

== Group B ==
The Group B tournament was played in Maribor, Slovenia, from 10 to 16 April 2011.

=== Final standings ===
Pos	Team	Pld	W	OTW	OTL	L	GF	GA	GD	Pts	Promotion or relegation
1	Denmark	5	4	0	0	1	31	10	+21	12	Promoted to the 2012 Top Division
2	Slovenia	5	4	0	0	1	18	14	+4	12	
3	France	5	2	1	0	2	19	11	+8	8	
4	Belarus	5	2	0	1	2	25	13	+12	7	
5	Poland	5	2	0	0	3	12	20	−8	6	
6	South Korea	5	0	0	0	5	11	48	−37	0	Relegated to the 2012 Division II

Source: IIHF

=== Results ===
All times are local (CEST/UTC+2).

10 April 2011; 13:00	South Korea	3–7 (2–2, 1–4, 0–1)	Poland	Tabor Ice Hall, Maribor

Game reference

10 April 2011; 16:30	France	2–1 (0–1, 1–0, 1–0)	Denmark	Tabor Ice Hall, Maribor

Game reference

10 April 2011; 20:00	Slovenia	4–3 (0–2, 2–1, 2–0)	Belarus	Tabor Ice Hall, Maribor

Game reference

11 April 2011; 15:00	Belarus	3–4 (GWS) (1–0, 0–3, 2–0, 0–0, 0–1)	France	Tabor Ice Hall, Maribor

Game reference

11 April 2011; 18:30	Denmark	16–2 (6–1, 7–1, 3–0)	South Korea	Tabor Ice Hall, Maribor

Game reference

12 April 2011; 18:30	Poland	0–2 (0–1, 0–0, 0–1)	Slovenia	Tabor Ice Hall, Maribor

Game reference

13 April 2011; 13:00	Belarus	8–0 (3–0, 3–0, 2–0)	South Korea	Tabor Ice Hall, Maribor

Game reference

13 April 2011; 16:30	Denmark	6–2 (2–0, 2–1, 2–1)	Poland	Tabor Ice Hall, Maribor

Game reference

13 April 2011; 20:00	Slovenia	4–2 (1–1, 0–1, 3–0)	France	Tabor Ice Hall, Maribor

Game reference

14 April 2011; 18:30	France	10–1 (6–0, 3–0, 1–1)	South Korea	Tabor Ice Hall, Maribor

Game reference

15 April 2011; 15:00	Poland	1–8 (0–4, 1–1, 0–3)	Belarus	Tabor Ice Hall, Maribor

Game reference

15 April 2011; 18:30	Denmark	4–1 (1–1, 2–0, 1–0)	Slovenia	Tabor Ice Hall, Maribor

Game reference

16 April 2011; 12:00	Poland	2–1 (0–1, 1–0, 1–0)	France	Tabor Ice Hall, Maribor

Game reference

16 April 2011; 15:30	Belarus	3–4 (0–1, 2–2, 1–1)	Denmark	Tabor Ice Hall, Maribor

Game reference

16 April 2011; 19:00	South Korea	5–7 (2–2, 1–2, 2–3)	Slovenia	Tabor Ice Hall, Maribor

Game reference

== See also ==
- 2011 IIHF World U18 Championships
- 2011 IIHF World U18 Championship Division II
- 2011 IIHF World U18 Championship Division III
