= Iceland men's national under-18 ice hockey team =

The Iceland men's national under-18 ice hockey team is the men's national under-18 ice hockey team of Iceland. The team is controlled by Ice Hockey Iceland, a member of the International Ice Hockey Federation. The team represents Iceland at the IIHF World U18 Championships.

== International competitions ==
=== IIHF World U18 Championships ===
- 1999: 7th in Division II Europe
- 2000: 9th in Division II Europe
- 2001: Did not qualify for Division III
- 2002: Did not participate
- 2003: 1st in Division III Group B
- 2004: 5th in Division II Group A
- 2005: 5th in Division II Group B
- 2006: 6th in Division II Group B
- 2007: 3rd in Division III
- 2008: 2nd in Division III Group B
- 2009: 1st in Division III Group B
- 2010: 6th in Division II Group A
- 2011: 1st in Division III Group B
- 2012: 4th in Division II Group B
- 2013: 5th in Division II Group B
- 2014: 6th in Division II Group B
- 2015: 1st in Division III Group A
- 2016: 4th in Division II Group B
- 2017: 5th in Division II Group B
- 2018: 6th in Division II Group B
- 2019: 2nd in Division III Group A
- 2020: Cancelled due to the COVID-19 pandemic
- 2021: Cancelled due to the COVID-19 pandemic
- 2022: 3rd in Division III Group A
- 2023: 2nd in Division III Group A
