= Ireland men's national under-18 ice hockey team =

The Ireland men's national under-18 ice hockey team is the men's national under-18 ice hockey team of Ireland. The team is controlled by the Irish Ice Hockey Association, a member of the International Ice Hockey Federation. The team represents Ireland at the IIHF World U18 Championships.

== International competitions ==
=== IIHF World U18 Championships ===
- 1999: 8th in European Division II (relegated)
- 2000: Lost in Qualification to European Division II (did not qualify)
- 2001–2008: Did not participate
- 2009: 3rd in Division III Group B
- 2010: 5th in Division III Group B
- 2011: 5th in Division III Group B
- 2012: Did not participate
- 2013: 4th in Division III Group B
- 2014–2017: Did not participate
