= Mexico men's national under-18 ice hockey team =

The Mexico men's national under-18 ice hockey team is the men's national under-18 ice hockey team of Mexico. The team is controlled by the Mexico Ice Hockey Federation, a member of the International Ice Hockey Federation. The team represents Mexico at the IIHF World U18 Championships.

== International competitions ==
=== IIHF Asian Oceanic U18 Championships ===
- 1991: 5th place

=== IIHF World U18 Championships ===
- 2003: 2nd in Division III Group A
- 2004: 1st in Division III
- 2005: 4th in Division II Group B
- 2006: 5th in Division II Group B
- 2007: 6th in Division II Group A
- 2008: 1st in Division III Group A
- 2009: 6th in Division II Group A
- 2010: 2nd in Division III Group B
- 2011: 2nd in Division III Group B
- 2012: 3rd in Division III
- 2013: 5th in Division III Group A
- 2014: 5th in Division III Group A
- 2015: 2nd in Division III Group A
- 2016: 6th in Division III Group A
- 2017: 1st in Division III Group B
- 2018: 2nd in Division III Group A
- 2019: 5th in Division III Group A
- 2020: Cancelled due to the COVID-19 pandemic
- 2021: Cancelled due to the COVID-19 pandemic
- 2022: 5th in Division III Group A
- 2023: 4th in Division III Group A
- 2024: 2nd in Division III Group A
- 2025: 1st in Division III Group A
- 2026: 2nd in Division II Group A
