= 2010 IIHF World U18 Championships =

2010 IIHF World U18 Championship

Tournament details
- Host country: Belarus
- Venues: 3 (in 2 host cities)
- Dates: April 13–23, 2010
- Teams: 10

Final positions
- Champions: United States (5th title)
- Runners-up: Sweden
- Third place: Finland
- Fourth place: Russia

Tournament statistics
- Games played: 30
- Goals scored: 207 (6.9 per game)
- Scoring leader(s): Teemu Pulkkinen (10 goals, 5 assists)

The 2010 IIHF World U18 Championships was the 12th edition of the IIHF World U18 Championship. The tournament was held in Minsk and Babruysk, Belarus, between April 13 and April 23, 2010. Tournament games were played at the Minsk Sports Palace in Minsk and the Babruysk Arena in Babruysk. The Final was played at the newly opened Minsk-Arena.

The United States won the gold medal for the second consecutive year, with a 3–1 victory over Sweden in the final game. The gold medal was the fifth for the United States since the tournament began in 1999; Sweden matched their best ever performance up to this point with a silver medal.

== Top Division ==
=== Preliminary Round ===
==== Group A ====
Pos	Team	Pld	W	OTW	OTL	L	GF	GA	GD	Pts	Qualification
1	Sweden	4	4	0	0	0	26	8	+18	12	Semifinals
2	United States	4	3	0	0	1	19	6	+13	9	Quarterfinals
3	Switzerland	4	2	0	0	2	9	18	−9	6	Quarterfinals
4	Canada	4	1	0	0	3	16	16	0	3	Relegation Round
5	Belarus	4	0	0	0	4	6	28	−22	0	Relegation Round

Source: IIHF

===== Fixtures =====
The Group A games took place in Bobruisk, Belarus, between April 13 and April 18.

All times local.

April 13; 15:00	Canada	1–3 (0–2, 1–0, 0–1)	Switzerland	Bobruisk Arena; Attendance: 2100

Game reference

Calvin Pickard
Goalies
Lukas Meili
Referees:
(Finland) Antti Boman
(Russia) Viktor Gashilov

	0 – 1	9:38 – G. Hofmann (D. Trutmann)
	0 – 2	17:33 – S. Guerra (Trutmann) (PP)
29:41 – Q. Howden (J. Weal)	1 – 2
	1 – 3	59:55 – J. Vermin (D. Kukan, Haas) (EN)

4 min
Penalties
6 min
34
Shots
33

April 13; 19:00	Sweden	4–2 (0–1, 1–1, 3–0)	United States	Bobruisk Arena; Attendance: 4100

Game reference

Johan Gustafsson
Goalies
Jack Campbell
Referees:
(Czech Republic) Martin Frano
(Finland) Sami Partanen

	0 – 1	3:36 – C. Balisy (M. Nieto, J. Faulk) (PP)
	0 – 2	22:24 – B. Saad (S. Johns)
33:32 – J. Larsson (V. Berglind (PP)	1 – 2
46:29 – H. Snall (M. Friberg)	2 – 2
49:14 – J. Larsson (P. Granberg)	3 – 2
59:41 – V. Rask (J. Larsson, L. Rensfeldt) (EN)	4 – 2

16 min
Penalties
12 min
31
Shots
28

April 14; 15:30	Switzerland	1–5 (1–1, 0–2, 0–2)	United States	Bobruisk Arena; Attendance: 2700

Game reference

Dennis Saikkonen
Goalies
Jack Campbell
Referees:
(Slovakia) Josef Kubus
(Latvia) Eduards Odins

11:58 – G. Hofmann (D. Sutter)	1 – 0
	1 – 1	12:25 – A. Czarnik (R. Grimaldi, L. Moffatt)
	1 – 2	24:01 – A. Czarnik (A. Clendening, J. Campbell)
	1 – 3	39:46 – B. Arnold (J. Faulk, B. Rust)
	1 – 4	48:41 – A. Clendening (R. Grimaldi)
	1 – 5	52:03 – J. Zucker (N. Shore, A. Clendening)

8 min
Penalties
18 min
23
Shots
29

April 14; 19:00	Sweden	7–0 (0–0, 5–0, 2–0)	Belarus	Bobruisk Arena; Attendance: 6200

Game reference

Jonas Gunnarsson
Goalies
Yan Shelepnev
Referees:
(Finland) Antti Boman
(Russia) Viktor Gashilov

20:56 – L. Rensfeldt (M. Friberg, J. Larsson) (PP)	1 – 0
23:59 – L. Rensfeldt (D. Mannberg, J. Larsson)	2 – 0
31:08 – A. Larsson (L. Rensfeldt, Berglind) (PP)	3 – 0
33:49 – M. Friberg (V. Berglind, L. Rensfeldt) (PP)	4 – 0
35:29 – J. Larsson	5 – 0
40:52 – J. Larsson (V. Berglind, A. Larsson) (PP)	6 – 0
44:36 – E. Thorell (S. Ottosson, A. Pettersson)	7 – 0

16 min
Penalties
26 min
46
Shots
8

April 15; 19:00	Belarus	3–11 (1–4, 2–2, 0–5)	Canada	Bobruisk Arena; Attendance: 7000

Game reference

Sergei Stepanov
Yan Shelepnev
Goalies
Calvin Pickard
Kent Simpson
Referees:
(Czech Republic) Martin Frano
(Slovakia) Jozef Kubus

	0 – 1	3:31 – B. Connolly
	0 – 2	5:00 – J. McFarland (J. Weal, G. McKegg)
	0 – 3	5:24 – R. O'Connor (G. Desjardins, M. Reinhart)
13:02 – Levsha	1 – 3
	1 – 4	14:26 – Q. Howden (B. Beukeboom) (SH)
20:24 – Kardashev (Lemachko, Lopachuk) (PP2)	2 – 4
24:22 – Zhevlochenko (Leonov) (PP)	3 – 4
	3 – 5	28:12 – J. McFarland (R. O'Connor) (PP)
	3 – 6	34:39 – R. O'Connor (G. McKegg) (PP)
	3 – 7	42:55 – M. Bournival (S. Silas)
	3 – 8	44:39 – G. McKegg (PP)
	3 – 9	45:01 – R. Spooner (G. Schemtisch, F. Hamilton)
	3 – 10	52:08 – J. Weal (SH)
	3 – 11	56:24 – J. McFarland (J. Weal, G. McKegg)

16 min
Penalties
45 min
26
Shots
42

April 16; 15:30	Switzerland	2–10 (0–2, 1–4, 1–4)	Sweden	Bobruisk Arena; Attendance: 2000

Game reference

Lukas Meili, Dennis Saikkonen
Goalies
Johan Gustafsson
Referees:
(Czech Republic) Martin Frano
(Latvia) Eduards Odins

	0 – 1	10:22 – J. Vestin (H. Snall)
	0 – 2	13:58 – J. Larsson (D. Mannberg, V. Berglind)
22:40 – D. Lammer (R. Kuonen, M. Leu)	1 – 2
	1 – 3	23:21 – M. Friberg (J. Larsson)
	1 – 4	29:33 – J. Vestin (J. Larsson)
	1 – 5	30:11 – L. Rensfeldt (D. Mannberg)
	1 – 6	35:39 – V. Rask (J. Nermark)
	1 – 7	44:13 – J. Larsson (L. Rensfeldt, J. Brodin) (PP)
44:59 – L. Martschini (D. Sutter, S. Bärtschi)	2 – 7
	2 – 8	48:06 – E. Thorell (J. Nordström, D. Mannberg)
	2 – 9	53:51 – Thorell (J. Nordström, F. Claesson)
	2 – 10	54:11 – H. Snall (L. Rensfeldt, J. Larsson)

10 min
Penalties
12 min
16
Shots
43

April 16; 19:00	United States	5–0 (3–0, 1–0, 1–0)	Canada	Bobruisk Arena; Attendance: 4500

Game reference

Jack Campbell
Goalies
Calvin Pickard
Referees:
(Finland) Antti Boman
(Finland) Sami Partanen

5:35 – J. Zucker (B. Saad, N. Shore)	1 – 0
6:58 – B. Rust (C. Balisy, J. Merrill) (PP)	2 – 0
17:09 – J. Zucker (A. Clendening) (PP)	3 – 0
37:08 – A. Watson (C. Brickley)	4 – 0
46:02 – B. Rust (B. Arnold, M. Nieto)	5 – 0

20 min
Penalties
16 min
38
Shots
30

April 17; 19:00	Belarus	2–3 (0–2, 1–0, 1–1)	Switzerland	Bobruisk Arena; Attendance: 6500

Game reference

Yan Shelepnev
Goalies
Lukas Meili
Referees:
(Russia) Viktor Gashilov
(Slovakia) Jozef Kubus

	0 – 1	10:41 – S. Guerra (D. Trutmann, S. Andrighetto)
	0 – 2	19:01 – S. Bärtschi (D. Trutmann) (PP)
23:34 – Gavrus (Lopachuk, Leonov) (PP)	1 – 2
42:56 – Lopachuk (Parfeyevets) <PP)	2 – 2
	2 – 3	58:28 – C. Hächler (J. Vermin, S. Andrighetto)

16 min
Penalties
24 min
27
Shots
30

April 18; 15:30	Canada	4–5 (0–2, 0–2, 4–1)	Sweden	Bobruisk Arena; Attendance: 3500

Game reference

Kent Simpson
Calvin Pickard
Goalies
Jonas Gunnarsson
Referees:
(Czech Republic) Martin Frano
(Latvia) Eduards Odins

	0 – 1	4:07 – V. Rask (J. Nermark)
	0 – 2	10:54 – Vestin (V. Berglind, M. Friberg) (PP)
	0 – 3	29:11 – L. Rensfeldt (P. Nemeth)
	0 – 4	39:45 – M. Granlund (P. Nemeth, V. Rask) (PP)
42:02 – R. O'Connor (S. Silas, G. McKegg)	1 – 4
44:58 – C. Thomas (G. McKegg, S. Shipley)	2 – 4
	2 – 5	46:15 – M. Granlund (V. Rask, J. Nermark)
54:37 – F. Hamilton (Q. Howden)	3 – 5
58:13 – Q. Howden (F. Hamilton, J. Weal)	4 – 5

32 min
Penalties
18 min
19
Shots
30

April 18; 19:00	United States	7–1 (2–0, 3–1, 2–0)	Belarus	Bobruisk Arena; Attendance: 7000

Game reference

Andy Iles
Goalies
Anton Ahres
Referees:
(Finland) Antti Boman
(Finland) Sami Partanen

17:50 – B. Saad (J. Zucker, N. Shore)	1 – 0
19:46 – A. Watson (C. Brickley, S. Johns)	2 – 0
24:31 – R. Grimaldi (S. Johns)	3 – 0
27:54 – A. Clendening (B. Saad)	4 – 0
34:29 – L. Moffatt (J. Tinordi, R. Grimaldi)	5 – 0
	5 – 1	35:32 – Abmiotka (Zhevlochenko, Lopachuk) (PP)
40:52 – B. Rust (N. Shore) (PP)	6 – 1
44:39 – J. Zucker (R. Grimaldi, A. Clendening) (PP)	7 – 1

12 min
Penalties
35 min
46
Shots
18

==== Group B ====
Pos	Team	Pld	W	OTW	OTL	L	GF	GA	GD	Pts	Qualification
1	Finland	4	3	1	0	0	21	11	+10	11	Semifinals
2	Russia	4	3	0	0	1	20	7	+13	9	Quarterfinals
3	Czech Republic	4	2	0	1	1	13	15	−2	7	Quarterfinals
4	Slovakia	4	1	0	0	3	10	15	−5	3	Relegation Round
5	Latvia	4	0	0	0	4	9	25	−16	0	Relegation Round

Source: IIHF

===== Fixtures =====
The Group B games took place in Minsk, Belarus, between April 13 and April 18.

All times local.

April 13; 15:00	Finland	7–2 (2–1, 4–1, 1–0)	Latvia	Minsk Palace; Attendance: 450

Game reference

Jonathan Iilahti
Goalies
Kristers Gudļevskis
Referees:
(Belarus) Maxim Sidorenko
(Canada) Pat Smith

6:25 – T. Pulkkinen (J. Donskoi, Mi. Granlund)	1 – 0
	1 – 1	13:51 – N. Kolesnikovs (Nimanis) (PP2)
15:46 – M. Salmivirta (T. Rautianinen, M. Partanen)	2 – 1
24:02 – T. Pulkkinen (Mi. Granlund) (PP)	3 – 1
35:13 – T. Rautiainen (Mi. Granlund, M. Partanen)	4 – 1
36:36 – J. Hakanpää (T. Pulkkinen, R. Väkiparta) (PP)	5 – 1
	5 – 2	38:47 – M. Diļevka (A. Kuzmenkovs) (SH)
39:53 – M. Hovinen (T. Pulkkinen, Mi. Granlund) (PP2)	6 – 2
57:27 – M. Teppo (M. Partanen, M. Granlund) (PP2)	7 – 2

30 min
Penalties
20 min
35
Shots
29

April 13; 19:00	Czech Republic	1–4 (0–1, 1–1, 0–2)	Russia	Minsk Palace; Attendance: 2300

Game reference

Libor Kašík
Goalies
Sergei Kostenko
Referees:
(Germany) Stephan Bauer
(Sweden) Pehr Claesson

	0 – 1	7:01 – S. Barbashev (R. Berdnikov)
	0 – 2	29:45 – M. Shalunov (V. Kartayev, R. Berdnikov)
39:10 – M. Vachovec (B. Jank, M. Frk) (PP)	1 – 2
	1 – 3	48:49 – V. Antipin (M. Shalunov, S. Stepanov) (PP2)
	1 – 4	57:00 – V. Namestnikov (E. Kuznetsov, S. Barbashev)

14 min
Penalties
16 min
15
Shots
40

April 14; 15:30	Latvia	0–9 (0–2, 0–4, 0–3)	Russia	Minsk Palace; Attendance: 2000

Game reference

Vadims Miščuks
Kristers Gudļevskis
Goalies
Andrei Vasilevski
Referees:
(United States) Scott Bokal
(Germany) Richard Schuetz

0 – 1	5:09 – N. Nesterov (Z. Arzamastsev) (PP)
0 – 2	7:32 – V. Namestnikov (S. Barbarshev)
0 – 3	20:29 – E. Kuznetsov (E. Gurkin, S. Barbashev)
0 – 4	22:23 – V. Namestnikov (Z. Arzamastsev, S. Barbashev)
0 – 5	25:51 – V. Namestnikov (E. Galimov)
0 – 6	33:17 – G. Zheldakov (V. Namestnikov) (PP)
0 – 7	40:23 – E. Kuznetsov (S. Barbashev)
0 – 8	43:42 – E. Kuznetsov (S. Stepanov)
0 – 9	57:49 – M. Shalunov

10 min
Penalties
12 min
18
Shots
50

April 14; 19:00	Czech Republic	4–3 (1–0, 2–0, 1–3)	Slovakia	Minsk Palace; Attendance: 2600

Game reference

Libor Kašík
Goalies
Dominik Riečický
Referees:
(Belarus) Maxim Sidorenko
(Canada) Pat Smith

19:46 – M. Vachovec (P. Holík, Frk) (PP2)	1 – 0
21:37 – P. Zámorský (M. Frk, B. Jank)	2 – 0
27:46 – M. Frk	3 – 0
	3 – 1	54:05 – B. Mráz (J. Rožnik, M. Tvrdoň) (PP)
55:49 – D. Uher (P. Zámorský, D. Dvořáček)	4 – 1
	4 – 2	56:15 –D. Šimčák (M. Toman)
	4 – 3	59:55 – D. Šimčák (B. Mráz, D. Bondra) (PP)

10 min
Penalties
10 min
24
Shots
22

April 15; 19:00	Slovakia	2–5 (0–1, 2–1, 0–3)	Finland	Minsk Palace; Attendance: 2500

Game reference

Dominik Riečický
Goalies
Jonathan Iilahti
Referees:
(Sweden) Pehr Claesson
(Germany) Richard Schuetz

	0 – 1	9:46 – Mi. Granlund (J. Donskoi, T. Pulkkinen)
32:47 – L. Cingeľ (Šimčák, M. Toman)	1 – 1
37:46 – M. Murček (V. Daras, J. Rožnik)	2 – 1
	2 – 2	39:17 – T. Pulkkinen (K. Mäkinen, J. Donskoi) (PP)
	2 – 3	47:23 – T. Pulkkinen (Mi. Granlund)
	2 – 4	56:41 – O. Paajanen (M. Åsten, R. Hämäläinen)
	2 – 5	59:46 – Mi. Granlund (J. Donskoi, T. Pulkkinen)

14 min
Penalties
6 min
19
Shots
35

April 16; 15:30	Latvia	4–5 (0–1, 1–2, 3–2)	Czech Republic	Minsk Palace; Attendance: 2500

Game reference

Kristers Gudļevskis
Goalies
Roman Will
Referees:
(Germany) Stephan Bauer
(Germany) Richard Schuetz

	0 – 1	15:56 – P. Holík (T. Filippi, M. Frk)
	0 – 2	22:17 – P. Holík (M. Frk, D. Žovinec)
25:20 – K. Pelšs (M. Diļevka, K. Freibergs)	1 – 2
	1 – 3	32:01 – P. Holík (M. Vachovec) (PP)
	1 – 4	41:08 – J. Sekáč (P. Lenoch)
45:45 – M. Diļevka (Dasutins, A. Kuzmenkovs) (PP)	2 – 4
52:58 – M. Diļevka (A. Kuzmenkovs, E. Siksna)	3 – 4
	3 – 5	54:14 – F. Hantak (D. Uher, D. Dvořáček)
57:53 – Straupe (N. Kolesnikovs)	4 – 5

20 min
Penalties
12 min
25
Shots
26

April 16; 19:00	Russia	4–5 (1–1, 0–2, 3–2)	Finland	Minsk Palace; Attendance: 3000

Game reference

Sergei Kostenko
Andrei Vasilevski
Goalies
Jonathan Iilahti
Referees:
(Belarus) Maxim Sidorenko
(Canada) Pat Smith

	0 – 1	1:55 – Ma. Granlund (M. Salomaki)
7:47 – E. Galimov (R. Lyubimov, Z. Arzamastsev)	1 – 1
	1 – 2	22:29 – T. Pulkkinen (Mi. Granlund, J. Donskoi) (PP)
	1 – 3	26:16 – T. Pulkkinen (J. Donskoi)
50:09 – E. Kuznetsov	2 – 3
52:13 – V. Namestnikov (E. Kuznetsov, S. Barbashev)	3 – 3
	3 – 4	53:14 – K. Makinen (Ma. Granlund)
	3 – 5	57:48 – M. Åsten (Teppo) (EN)
59:11 – S. Barbashev (V. Antipin, E. Kuznetsov)	4 – 5

14 min
Penalties
14 min
37
Shots
23

April 17; 19:00	Slovakia	4–3 (1–0, 2–2, 1–1)	Latvia	Minsk Palace; Attendance: 3100

Game reference

Dominik Riečický
Goalies
Kristers Gudļevskis
Referees:
(United States) Scott Bokal
(Sweden) Pehr Claesson

13:50 – D. Šimčák (M. Toman) (PP)	1 – 0
21:48 – T. Matoušek (Krempaský)	2 – 0
34:32 – M. Toman (L. Cingeľ)	3 – 0
	3 – 1	39:36 – Z. Girgensons (Straupe)
	3 – 2	39:52 – A. Kuzmenkovs (M. Diļevka)
	3 – 3	51:36 – K. Freibergs (A. Kuzmenkovs) (PP)
59:20 – M. Tvrdoň (M. Marinčin)	4 – 3

22 min
Penalties
12 min
39
Shots
34

April 18; 15:30	Russia	3–1 (3–1, 0–0, 0–0)	Slovakia	Minsk Palace; Attendance: 3100

Game reference

Sergei Kostenko
Goalies
Dominik Riečický
Referees:
(Germany) Stephan Bauer
(Germany) Richard Schuetz

00:39 – N. Nesterov (V. Namestnikov)	1–0
05:54 – E. Gurkin (R. Berdnikov, G. Zheldakov)	2–0
	2–1	15:08 – T. Matoušek (B. Krempaský)
17:53 – E. Gurkin (R. Berdnikov, E. Kuznetsov)	3–1

8 min
Penalties
14 min
32
Shots
20

April 18; 19:00	Finland	4 – 3 GWS (0–1, 1–2, 2–0, 0–0, 1–0)	Czech Republic	Minsk Palace; Attendance: 3000

Game reference

Jonathan Iilahti
Goalies
Libor Kašík
Referees:
(United States) Scott Bokal
(Sweden) Pehr Claesson

	0 – 1	1:19 – P. Holík
22:35 – P. Halinen (Ma. Granlund)	1 – 1
	1 – 2	24:53 – B. Jank (M. Vachovec) (PP)
	1 – 3	33:21 – J. Sekáč
45:57 – Mi. Granlund (J. Donskoi, T. Pulkkinen (PP)	2 – 3
56:02 – M. Partanen (M. Salmivirta)	3 – 3
65:00 – J. Donskoi (GWG)	4 – 3

8 min
Penalties
10 min
36
Shots
26

=== Relegation round ===
Pos	Team	Pld	W	OTW	OTL	L	GF	GA	GD	Pts	Qualification or relegation
1	Canada	3	3	0	0	0	20	6	+14	9	Qualified for the 2011 IIHF World U18 Championship
2	Slovakia	3	2	0	0	1	11	8	+3	6	Qualified for the 2011 IIHF World U18 Championship
3	Latvia	3	0	1	0	2	9	13	−4	2	Relegated to 2011 IIHF U18 World Championship Division I
4	Belarus	3	0	0	1	2	8	21	−13	1	Relegated to 2011 IIHF U18 World Championship Division I

Source: IIHF

==== Results ====
Note: The following matches from the preliminary round carry forward to the relegation round:

- April 15, 2010: Canada 11–3 Belarus
- April 17, 2010: Slovakia 4–3 Latvia

April 20; 19:00	Slovakia	5–1 (1–0, 2–1, 2–0)	Belarus	Bobruisk Arena; Attendance: 6000

Game reference

Dominik Riečický
Goalies
Yan Shelepnev
Anton Ahres
Referees:
(Germany) Stephan Bauer
(United States) Scott Bokal

0:19 – P. Trška (D. Šimčák, M. Toman)	1–0
20:40 – L. Cingeľ (D. Šimčák)	2–0
33:30 – M. Marinčin (M. Murček)	3–0
	3–1	38:48 – Ageyenko (Dalidovich, Skabelka) (PP)
56:07 – M. Tvrdoň (D. Bondra)	4–1
59:44 – M. Tvrdoň (D. Bondra, P. Trška) (PP)	5–1

8 min
Penalties
8 min
30
Shots
23

April 21; 19:00	Canada	5–1 (2–0, 1–1, 2–0)	Latvia	Bobruisk Arena; Attendance: 3200

Game reference

Calvin Pickard
Goalies
Kristers Gudļevskis
Referees:
(Finland) Antti Boman
(Finland) Sami Partanen

12:36 – J. Weal (F. Hamilton)	1–0
13:27 – M. Sgarbossa (M. Bournival, G. Desjardins)	2–0
26:11 – M. Bournival (G. Desjardins, M. Sgarbossa)	3–0
	3–1	39:42 – E. Siksna (A. Kuzmenkovs, K. Pelšs) (PP)
48:47 – J. McFarland (J. Weal, R. O'Connor) (PP2)	4–1
55:28 – J. Weal (F. Hamilton, Q. Howden)	5–1

14 min
Penalties
30 min
39
Shots
16

April 22; 15:30	Canada	4–2 (4–0, 0–1, 0–1)	Slovakia	Bobruisk Arena; Attendance: 2000

Game reference

Calvin Pickard
Goalies
Dominik Riečický
Referees:
(Sweden) Pehr Claesson
(Russia) Viktor Gashilov

1:01 – S. Shipley (C. Thomas, G. McKegg)	1–0
14:24 – Q. Howden (E. Gudbranson, F. Hamilton)	2–0
18:58 – R. Spooner (J. Weal, J. McFarland) (PP2)	3–0
19:09 – C. Thomas (S. Shipley) (PP)	4–0
	4–1	26:51 – M. Marinčin (L. Cingeľ) (PP2)
	4–2	46:13 – M. Kalináč (B. Krempaský, P. Trška)

22 min
Penalties
22 min
42
Shots
19

April 22; 19:00	Belarus	4–5 GWS (1–1, 1–2, 2–1, 0–0, 0–1)	Latvia	Bobruisk Arena; Attendance: 6000

Game reference

Anton Ahres
Goalies
Kristers Gudļevskis
Referees:
(Czech Republic) Martin Frano
(Germany) Richard Schuetz

12:50 – Zhevlochenko (Leonov, Lopachuk) (PP)	1–0
	1–1	13:21 – Kurmis (Z. Girgensons, Straupe)
	1–2	27:12 – Daustins (Upenieks, Lavins)
	1–3	33:57 – Dudins (Ziemins, Upenieks)
35:31 – Lopachuk (Levsha)	2–3
40:40 – Leonov (Zhevlochenko)	3–3
46:13 – Levsha (Lopachuk, Abimotka)	4–3
	4–4	55:53 – K. Pelšs
	4–5	65:00 – Z. Girgensons (GWG)

12 min
Penalties
14 min
37
Shots
30

=== Final round ===
Quarterfinals
A2	United States	6
B3	Czech Republic	0
B2	Russia	4
A3	Switzerland	3

Semifinals
B1	Finland	0
A2	United States	5
A1	Sweden	3
B2	Russia	1

Final
A2	United States	3
A1	Sweden	1
Third place match
B1	Finland	5
B2	Russia	1

==== Quarterfinals ====
April 20, 2010; 15:30	United States	6–0 (2–0, 3–0, 1–0)	Czech Republic	Minsk Palace; Attendance: 3000

Game reference

Jack Campbell
Goalies
Libor Kašík, Roman Will
Referees:
(Russia) Viktor Gashilov
(Slovakia) Jozef Kubus

13:34 – B. Saad (J. Zucker, D. Forbort)	1 – 0
15:56 – A. Czarnik (R. Grimaldi)	2 – 0
31:44 – A. Czarnik (A. Clendening, A. Watson)	3 – 0
36:53 – N. Shore (C. Balisy, A. Clendening)	4 – 0
37:13 – A. Czarnik (C. Brickley, R. Grimaldi)	5 – 0
43:36 – B. Rust (A. Watson, N. Shore)	6 – 0

18 min
Penalties
18 min
36
Shots
11

April 20, 2010; 19:00	Russia	4–3 (2–0, 1–0, 1–3)	Switzerland	Minsk Palace; Attendance: 3200

Game reference

Andrei Vasilevski
Goalies
Lukas Meili
Referees:
(Belarus) Maxim Sidorenko
(Canada) Pat Smith

05:45 – E. Kuznetsov	1 – 0
08:16 – M. Shalunov (E. Gurkin)	2 – 0
30:15 – R. Berdnikov (Stepanov, E. Kuznetsov)	3 – 0
42:16 – R. Berdnikov (E. Kuznetsov, V. Kartayev)	4 – 0
	4 – 1	55:07 – Schmutz (Kukan)
	4 – 2	55:42 – Leuenberger (Martschini, Trutmann)
	4 – 3	58:56 – Hofmann (Bartschi)

6 min
Penalties
8 min
33
Shots
29

==== Semifinals ====
April 21, 2010; 15:30	Finland	0–5 (0–1, 0–2, 0–2)	United States	Minsk Palace; Attendance: 1200

Game reference

Jonathan Iilahti
Goalies
Jack Campbell
Referees:
(Belarus) Maxim Sidorenko
(Canada) Pat Smith

0 – 1	05:44 – N. Shore (B. Saad)
0 – 2	26:19 – M. Nieto (B. Rust, J. Campbell)
0 – 3	39:59 – A. Clendening (N. Shore, C. Brickley)
0 – 4	49:22 – N. Shore (J. Faulk)
0 – 5	50:56 – J. Tinordi (B. Arnold, M. Nieto)

6 min
Penalties
10 min
14
Shots
27

April 21, 2010; 19:00	Sweden	3–1 (1–1, 0–0, 2–0)	Russia	Minsk Palace; Attendance: 3150

Game reference

Johan Gustafsson
Goalies
Andrei Vasilevski
Referees:
(Slovakia) Jozef Kubus
(Latvia) Eduards Odins

	0 – 1	8:07 – V. Kartayev (E. Kuznetsov) (PP)
12:58 – L. Rensfeldt (V. Berglind, J. Larsson) (PP)	1 – 1
48:32 – A. Larsson (J. Larsson, L. Rensfeldt) (PP)	2 – 1
49:52 – M. Granlund (J. Vestin)	3 – 1

22 min
Penalties
22 min
35
Shots
21

==== Fifth place game ====
April 22, 2010; 19:00	Czech Republic	5–6 (0–1, 4–4, 1–1)	Switzerland	Minsk Palace; Attendance: 2200

Game reference

Roman Will
Libor Kašík
Goalies
Lukas Meili
Referees:
(United States) Scott Bokal
(Latvia) Eduards Odins

	0 – 1	18:00 – Lammer (Rexha)
20:44 – P. Holík (M. Vachovec) (SH)	1 – 1
	1 – 2	21:01 – Hofmann (Schmutz, Andrighetto)
	1 – 3	26:24 – Hofmann (Kukan, Martschini) (PP)
27:55 – T. Filippi (J. Klimíček)	2 – 3
	2 – 4	28:40 – Lammer (Vermin)
32:25 – M. Frk (P. Holík)	3 – 4
33:25 – J. Sekáč (B. Jank, D. Koudela)	4 – 4
	4 – 5	39:25 – Vermin (Lammer)
	4 – 6	43:08 – Vermin (Haas, Lammer)
59:26 – J. Sekáč (B. Jank, J. Klimíček) (SH)	5 – 6

18 min
Penalties
4 min
35
Shots
36

==== Bronze medal game ====
April 23, 2010; 15:00	Finland	5–1 (0–0, 1–0, 4–1)	Russia	Minsk Palace; Attendance: 2220

Game reference

Jonathan Iilahti
Goalies
Andrei Vasilevski
Referees:
(Sweden) Pehr Claesson
(Czech Republic) Martin Frano

35:17 – T. Pulkkinen (J. Hakanpää) (PP)	1 – 0
42:33 – Mi. Granlund (Ma. Granlund) (PP)	2 – 0
47:52 – J. Donskoi (Mi. Granlund, R. Väkiparta)	3 – 0
49:39 – T. Pulkkinen (Ma. Granlund, Mi. Granlund) (PP)	4 – 0
55:00 – T. Pulkkinen (Mi. Granlund)	5 – 0
	5 – 1	58:41 – E. Galimov (P. Kulikov) (SH)

87 min
Penalties
95 min
27
Shots
19

==== Gold medal game ====
April 23, 2010; 19:00	Sweden	1–3 (0–1, 0–2, 1–0)	United States	Minsk-Arena; Attendance: 12820

Game reference

Johan Gustafsson
Goalies
Jack Campbell
Referees:
(Germany) Stephan Bauer
(Finland) Sami Partanen

	0 – 1	2:10 – L. Moffatt (D. Forbort, R. Grimaldi)
	0 – 2	27:31 – J. Faulk (N. Shore, A. Czarnik)
	0 – 3	33:47 – R. Grimaldi (J. Zucker, A. Clendening) (PP)
46:54 – L. Rensfeldt (J. Brodin, S. Ottosson)	1 – 3

8 min
Penalties
29 min
34
Shots
33

=== Tournament awards ===
Best players selected by the directorate

- Best Goalkeeper: Jack Campbell United States
- Best Forward: Teemu Pulkkinen Finland
- Best Defenseman: Adam Larsson Sweden

=== Scoring leaders ===
List shows the top skaters sorted by points, then goals.

Player	GP	G	A	Pts	+/−	PIM
(Finland) Teemu Pulkkinen	6	10	5	15	−2	10
(Sweden) Johan Larsson	5	6	8	14	+8	0
(Finland) Mikael Granlund	6	4	9	13	0	4
(Sweden) Ludvig Rensfeldt	6	6	6	12	+7	4
(Russia) Evgeny Kuznetsov	7	5	7	12	+8	6
(United States) Adam Clendening	7	3	7	10	+9	4
(United States) Nick Shore	7	3	7	10	+7	0
(United States) Rocco Grimaldi	7	2	8	10	+6	6
(Canada) Jordan Weal	6	3	6	9	+8	30
(Russia) Sergei Barbashev	7	2	6	8	+5	6
(Finland) Joonas Donskoi	6	1	7	8	−1	0

GP = Games played; G = Goals; A = Assists; Pts = Points; +/− = Plus/minus; PIM = Penalties in minutes; POS = Position
Source: IIHF.com

=== Leading goaltenders ===
Only the top five goaltenders, based on save percentage, who have played 40% of their team's minutes are included in this list.

Player	TOI	SA	GA	GAA	Sv%	SO
(United States) Jack Campbell	359:39	143	5	0.83	96.50	3
(Sweden) Johan Gustafsson	238:10	98	8	2.02	91.84	0
(Russia) Andrei Vasilevskiy	272:03	116	12	2.65	89.66	1
(Slovakia) Dominik Riecicky	359:38	190	20	3.34	89.47	0
(Canada) Calvin Pickard	313:50	141	15	2.87	89.36	0

TOI = Time on ice (minutes:seconds); SA = Shots against; GA = Goals against; GAA = Goals against average; Sv% = Save percentage; SO = Shutouts
Source: IIHF.com

=== Final standings ===
Rk.	Team
1st place, gold medalist(s)	United States
2nd place, silver medalist(s)	Sweden
3rd place, bronze medalist(s)	Finland
4	Russia
5	Switzerland
6	Czech Republic
7	Canada
8	Slovakia
9	Latvia
10	Belarus

Belarus and Latvia were relegated to Division I for the 2011 IIHF World U18 Championships.

== Division I ==
=== Group A ===
The tournament was played in Herning, Denmark, between April 12 and April 18, 2010.

Pos	Team	Pld	W	OTW	OTL	L	GF	GA	GD	Pts	Promotion or relegation
1	Norway	5	4	0	0	1	33	15	+18	12	Promoted to the 2011 Top Division
2	Denmark	5	4	0	0	1	34	14	+20	12	
3	Japan	5	3	0	0	2	27	25	+2	9	
4	France	5	3	0	0	2	21	21	0	9	
5	South Korea	5	0	1	0	4	18	45	−27	2	
6	Austria	5	0	0	1	4	12	25	−13	1	Relegated to the 2011 Division II

Source: IIHF

=== Group B ===
The tournament was played in Krynica-Zdrój, Poland, between April 11 and April 17, 2010.

Pos	Team	Pld	W	OTW	OTL	L	GF	GA	GD	Pts	Promotion or relegation
1	Germany	5	5	0	0	0	51	2	+49	15	Promoted to the 2011 Top Division
2	Hungary	5	3	0	1	1	19	17	+2	10	
3	Poland	5	3	0	0	2	21	21	0	9	
4	Kazakhstan	5	2	0	0	3	9	16	−7	6	
5	Great Britain	5	1	1	0	3	13	24	−11	5	
6	Lithuania	5	0	0	0	5	6	39	−33	0	Relegated to the 2011 Division II

Source: IIHF

== Division II ==
=== Group A ===
The tournament was played in Narva, Estonia, between March 13 and March 19, 2010.

Pos	Team	Pld	W	OTW	OTL	L	GF	GA	GD	Pts	Promotion or relegation
1	Italy	5	5	0	0	0	55	3	+52	15	Promoted to the 2011 Division I
2	Romania	5	3	0	1	1	22	23	−1	10	
3	Croatia	5	1	3	0	1	20	16	+4	9	
4	Serbia	5	1	0	1	3	11	19	−8	4	
5	Estonia	5	1	0	1	3	17	32	−15	4	
6	Iceland	5	1	0	0	4	12	44	−32	3	Relegated to the 2011 Division III

Source: IIHF

=== Group B ===
The tournament was played in Kyiv, Ukraine, between March 22 and March 28, 2010.

Pos	Team	Pld	W	OTW	OTL	L	GF	GA	GD	Pts	Promotion or relegation
1	Slovenia	5	5	0	0	0	63	4	+59	15	Promoted to the 2011 Division I
2	Ukraine	5	4	0	0	1	26	3	+23	12	
3	Spain	5	2	1	0	2	17	22	−5	8	
4	Netherlands	5	2	0	1	2	14	27	−13	7	
5	Belgium	5	0	1	0	4	7	41	−34	2	
6	Australia	5	0	0	1	4	7	37	−30	1	Relegated to the 2011 Division III

Source: IIHF

== Division III ==
=== Group A ===
The tournament was played in Erzurum, Turkey, between March 8 and March 14, 2010.

Pos	Team	Pld	W	OTW	OTL	L	GF	GA	GD	Pts	Promotion
1	China	4	4	0	0	0	53	11	+42	12	Promoted to the 2011 Division II
2	Turkey	4	2	1	0	1	33	13	+20	8	
3	Chinese Taipei	4	2	0	0	2	30	18	+12	6	
4	Bulgaria	4	1	0	1	2	24	22	+2	4	
5	Mongolia	4	0	0	0	4	2	78	−76	0	

Source: IIHF

=== Group B ===
The tournament was played in Monterrey, Mexico, between March 14 and March 20, 2010.

Pos	Team	Pld	W	OTW	OTL	L	GF	GA	GD	Pts	Promotion
1	New Zealand	4	4	0	0	0	26	16	+10	12	Promoted to the 2011 Division II
2	Mexico	4	3	0	0	1	15	11	+4	9	
3	South Africa	4	1	1	0	2	15	14	+1	5	
4	Israel	4	1	0	1	2	21	16	+5	4	
5	Ireland	4	0	0	0	4	6	26	−20	0	

Source: IIHF

== See also ==
- 2010 IIHF World U18 Championship Division I
- 2010 IIHF World U18 Championship Division II
- 2010 IIHF World U18 Championship Division III
- 2010 World Junior Ice Hockey Championships
- 2010 World U-17 Hockey Challenge
