= Ottosson =

Ottosson is a surname. Notable people with the surname include:

- Anna Ottosson (born 1976), Swedish alpine skier, 2006 Winter Olympics bronze medallist
- Jan Ottosson (born 1960), former Swedish Cross-country skier
- Kjell-Arne Ottosson (born 1975), Swedish politician
- Kristofer Ottosson (born 1976), Swedish former professional ice hockey player
- Paul N. J. Ottosson (born 1966), Swedish sound engineer
- Sebastian Ottosson (born 1992), Swedish professional ice hockey player
- Ulf Ottosson (born 1968), retired Swedish football striker
