= Chase Balisy =

American ice hockey player (born 1992)

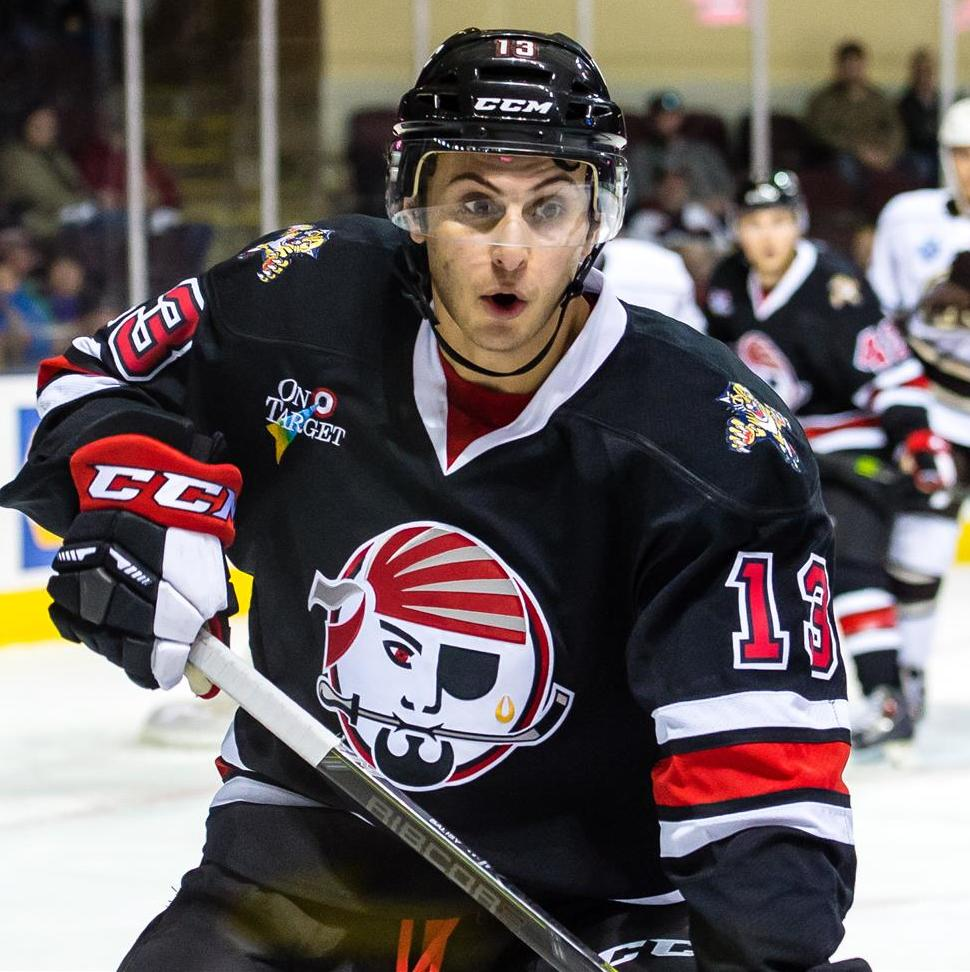
- Balisy in 2015
- Born: February 2, 1992 (age 34) Fullerton, California, U.S.
- Height: 5 ft 11 in (180 cm)
- Weight: 180 lb (82 kg; 12 st 12 lb)
- Position: Right wing
- Shot: Left
- Played for: Florida Panthers; Straubing Tigers
- NHL draft: 170th overall, 2011; Nashville Predators
- Playing career: 2014–2022

Chasen Nicholas Balisy (born February 2, 1992) is an American former professional ice hockey forward who played for the Florida Panthers in the National Hockey League (NHL) and was originally drafted by the Nashville Predators, 170th overall, in the 2011 NHL entry draft.

== Playing career ==
Balisy played three seasons within the USA Hockey National Team Development Program before committing to play collegiate hockey with Western Michigan University then of the Central Collegiate Hockey Association. In his freshman year with the Broncos in the 2010–11 season, he was selected to the CCHA All-Rookie team having contributing with 12 goals and 30 points in 42 games. Balisy gained NHL attention and was selected in the 6th round, 170th overall, in the 2011 NHL entry draft by the Nashville Predators.

At the conclusion of his senior season with the Broncos in the 2013–14 season, Balisy rights were relinquished by the Nashville Predators, entitling him to free agency. On August 28, 2014, he agreed to a one-year American Hockey League (AHL) contract with the St. John's IceCaps, affiliate to the Winnipeg Jets. In his professional debut season with the IceCaps in 2014–15, Balisy was instrumental in the IceCaps offense, leading the team with 21 goals and finishing with 44 points in 73 games.

On June 2, 2015, Balisy was signed to his first NHL contract, agreeing to a two-year, entry-level deal with the Florida Panthers.

In the 2017–18 season, Balisy was assigned by Florida to the Springfield Thunderbirds in the AHL before he received his first recall by the Panthers on October 27, 2017. He made his NHL debut with Florida the following day in a 3-2 shootout defeat to the Detroit Red Wings on October 29, 2017.

As a free agent from the Panthers in the off-season, Balisy signed a one-year, two-way contract with the Ottawa Senators on August 10, 2018.

At the conclusion of his contract with the Senators, Balisy opted for a move abroad, signing a one-year deal as a free agent with German club, Straubing Tigers of the Deutsche Eishockey Liga (DEL), on July 19, 2019.

Balisy remained with the Straubing Tigers for three seasons before concluding his eight-year professional career following the 2021-22 season to return to home state, California.

== Career statistics ==
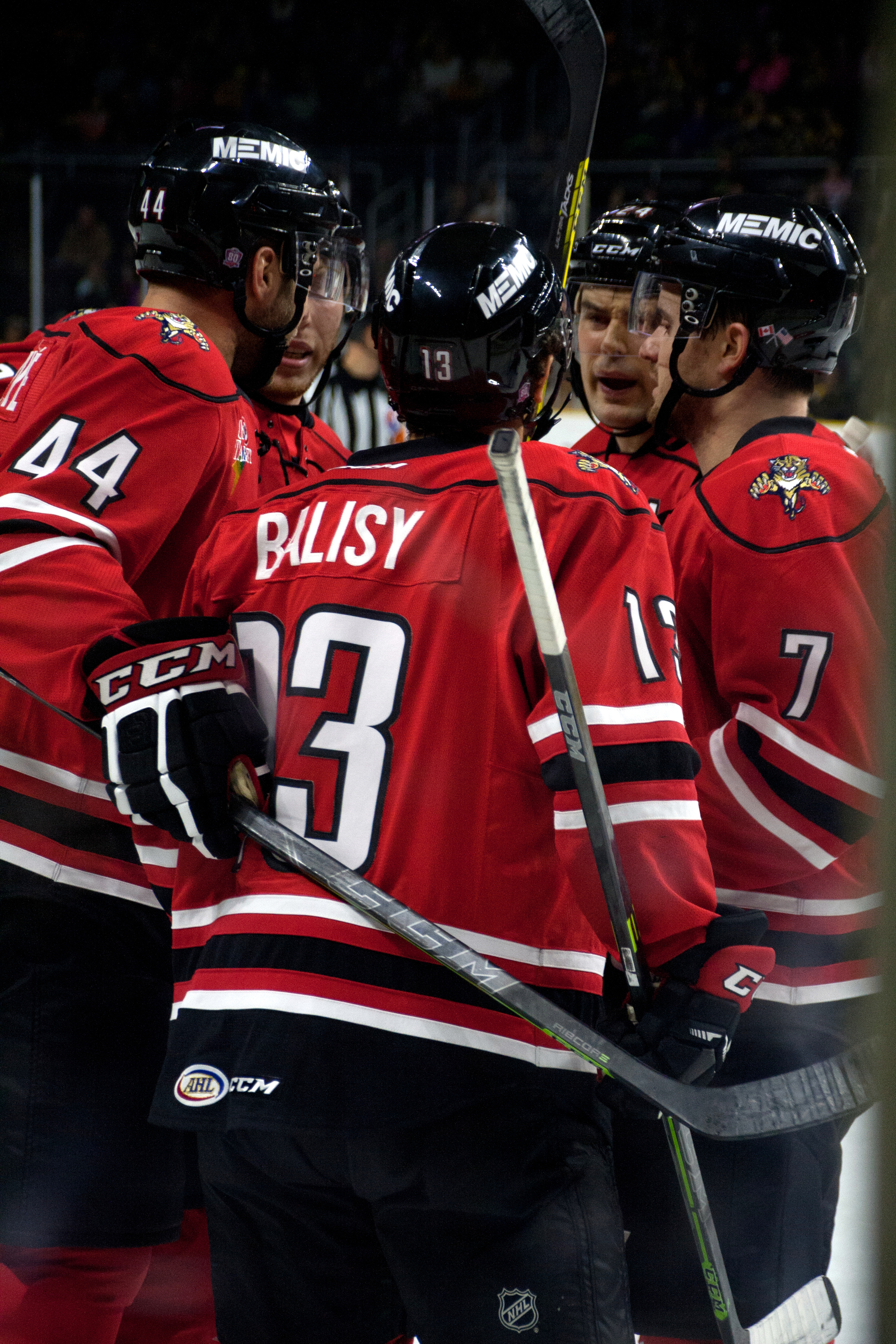
Balisy during his tenure with the Portland Pirates in 2015.

=== Regular season and playoffs ===
			Regular season					Playoffs
Season	Team	League	GP	G	A	Pts	PIM	GP	G	A	Pts	PIM
2009–10	Toronto Jr. Canadiens	GTMMHL	80	40	110	150	22	—	—	—	—	—
2008–09	U.S. National Development Team	NAHL	42	8	14	22	8	9	0	3	3	0
2009–10	U.S. National Development Team	USHL	28	5	6	11	8	—	—	—	—	—
2010–11	Western Michigan University	CCHA	42	12	18	30	12	—	—	—	—	—
2011–12	Western Michigan University	CCHA	41	13	24	37	35	—	—	—	—	—
2012–13	Western Michigan University	CCHA	38	11	14	25	12	—	—	—	—	—
2013–14	Western Michigan University	NCHC	40	13	24	37	14	—	—	—	—	—
2014–15	St. John's IceCaps	AHL	73	21	23	44	30	—	—	—	—	—
2015–16	Portland Pirates	AHL	69	9	17	26	12	2	0	1	1	0
2016–17	Springfield Thunderbirds	AHL	76	17	28	45	26	—	—	—	—	—
2017–18	Springfield Thunderbirds	AHL	67	14	21	35	61	—	—	—	—	—
2017–18	Florida Panthers	NHL	8	0	0	0	0	—	—	—	—	—
2018–19	Belleville Senators	AHL	76	7	15	22	36	—	—	—	—	—
2019–20	Straubing Tigers	DEL	52	8	22	30	26	—	—	—	—	—
2020–21	Straubing Tigers	DEL	37	10	9	19	26	3	0	1	1	4
2021–22	Straubing Tigers	DEL	54	4	25	29	35	4	0	1	1	4
NHL totals			8	0	0	0	0	—	—	—	—	—
DEL totals			143	22	56	78	87	7	0	2	2	8

=== International ===
Year	Team	Event	Result	GP	G	A	Pts	PIM
2010	United States	U18	1st place, gold medalist(s)	7	1	2	3	4
Junior totals				7	1	2	3	4

== Awards and honours ==
Award	Year
College
CCHA All-Rookie Team	2011
NCHC Second All-Star Team	2014
