= Lukáš Cingeľ =

Slovak ice hockey player (born 1992)

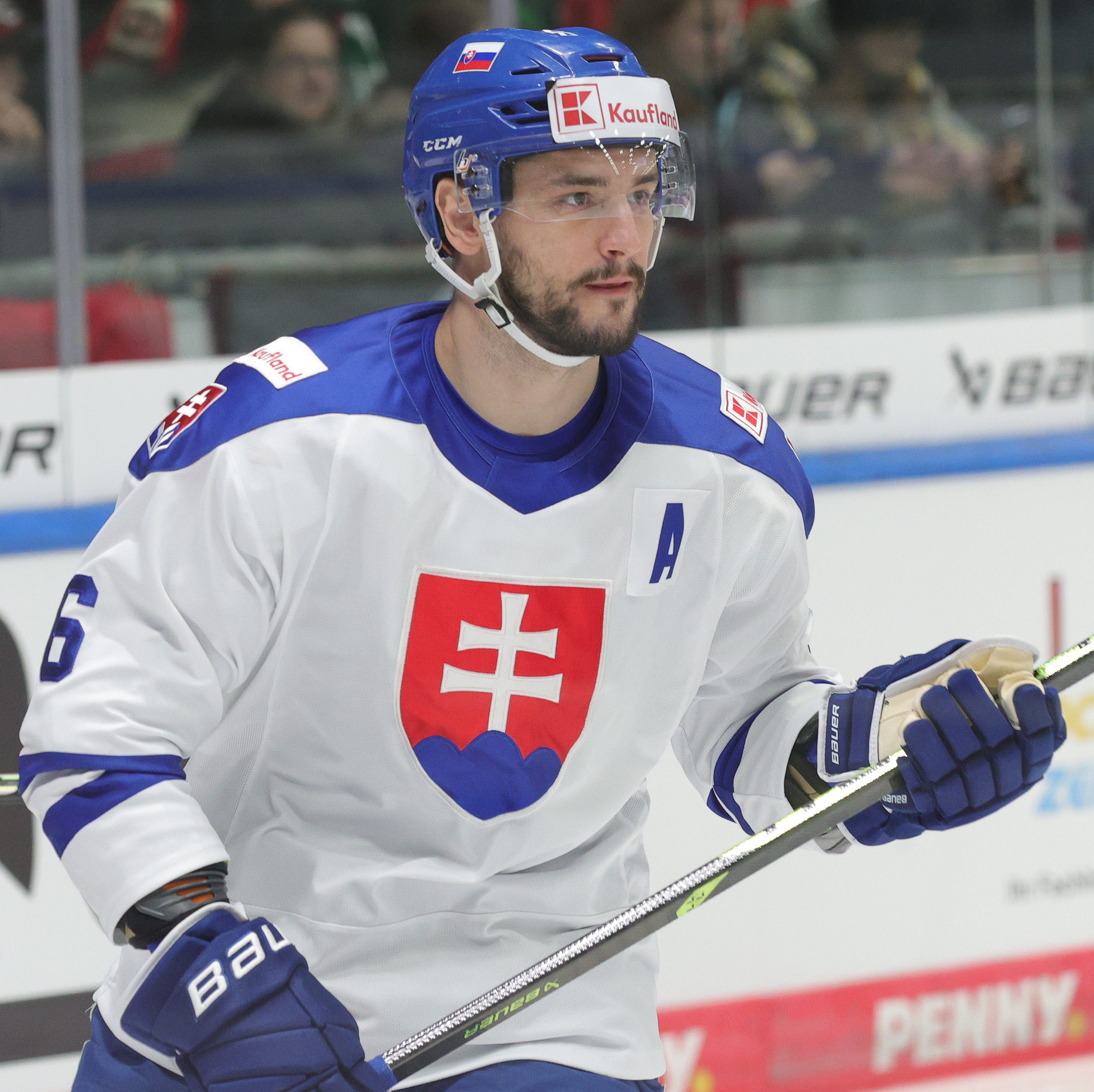
- Born: June 10, 1992 (age 34) Žilina, Czechoslovakia
- Height: 6 ft 2 in (188 cm)
- Weight: 205 lb (93 kg; 14 st 9 lb)
- Position: Forward
- Shoots: Left
- ELH team Former teams: HC Kometa Brno; MsHK Žilina; HK Orange 20; HC Lev Praha; HC Litoměřice; HC Sparta Praha; Mountfield HK
- National team: Slovakia
- Playing career: 2009–present

Lukáš Cingeľ (born 10 June 1992) is a Slovak professional ice hockey player who is a forward for HC Kometa Brno of the Czech Extraliga (ELH).

He participated for Slovakia at the 2017 IIHF World Championship.

== Career statistics ==
=== Regular season and playoffs ===
			Regular season					Playoffs
Season	Team	League	GP	G	A	Pts	PIM	GP	G	A	Pts	PIM
2006–07	MsHK Žilina	SVK U18	4	1	1	2	0	—	—	—	—	—
2007–08	MsHK Žilina	SVK U18	53	18	21	39	38	—	—	—	—	—
2008–09	MsHK Žilina	SVK U18	21	13	12	25	33	—	—	—	—	—
2008–09	MsHK Žilina	SVK U20	36	7	4	11	18	—	—	—	—	—
2009–10	MsHK Žilina	SVK U20	8	1	4	5	6	—	—	—	—	—
2009–10	MsHK Žilina	SVK	2	0	0	0	0	—	—	—	—	—
2009–10	HK Orange 20	SVK	32	2	4	6	10	—	—	—	—	—
2010–11	Baie–Comeau Drakkar	QMJHL	68	18	32	50	16	—	—	—	—	—
2011–12	Baie–Comeau Drakkar	QMJHL	63	18	20	38	24	8	4	2	6	4
2012–13	HC Lev Praha	KHL	15	1	0	1	2	3	0	0	0	0
2012–13	HC Stadion Litoměřice	CZE.2	6	2	1	3	2	—	—	—	—	—
2013–14	HC Lev Praha	KHL	41	2	2	4	6	18	2	1	3	2
2013–14	HC Stadion Litoměřice	CZE.2	4	2	1	3	0	—	—	—	—	—
2014–15	HC Sparta Praha	ELH	39	13	10	23	18	6	1	0	1	4
2015–16	HC Sparta Praha	ELH	23	6	6	12	10	4	0	1	1	0
2016–17	HC Sparta Praha	ELH	50	8	12	20	16	4	0	1	1	2
2017–18	Mountfield HK	ELH	49	7	15	22	16	13	3	1	4	2
2018–19	Mountfield HK	ELH	46	12	11	23	20	4	0	1	1	2
2019–20	Mountfield HK	ELH	52	14	14	28	12	2	0	0	0	2
2020–21	Mountfield HK	ELH	46	6	17	23	18	2	0	0	0	0
2021–22	Mountfield HK	ELH	29	4	7	11	11	5	0	2	2	0
2022–23	Mountfield HK	ELH	51	11	21	32	20	4	2	0	2	0
2023–24	HC Kometa Brno	ELH	52	14	24	38	20	6	1	1	2	2
2024–25	HC Kometa Brno	ELH	52	11	16	27	14	18	4	3	7	8
2025–26	HC Kometa Brno	ELH	46	9	6	15	12	8	0	2	2	8
SVK totals			34	2	4	6	10	—	—	—	—	—
KHL totals			56	3	2	5	8	21	2	1	3	2
ELH totals			535	115	159	274	187	76	11	12	23	30

=== International ===
Year	Team	Event	Result	GP	G	A	Pts	PIM
2009	Slovakia	IH18	6th	4	3	3	6	0
2010	Slovakia	WJC18	8th	6	2	2	4	6
2017	Slovakia	WC	14th	7	0	1	1	2
2018	Slovakia	OG	11th	4	0	0	0	2
2018	Slovakia	WC	9th	7	0	0	0	0
2024	Slovakia	WC	7th	8	3	1	4	0
2024	Slovakia	OGQ	Q	3	0	2	2	0
2026	Slovakia	OG	4th	6	0	1	1	2
Junior totals				10	5	5	10	6
Senior totals				35	3	5	8	6
