= Viktor Antipin =

Russian ice hockey player (born 1992)

Victor Antipin
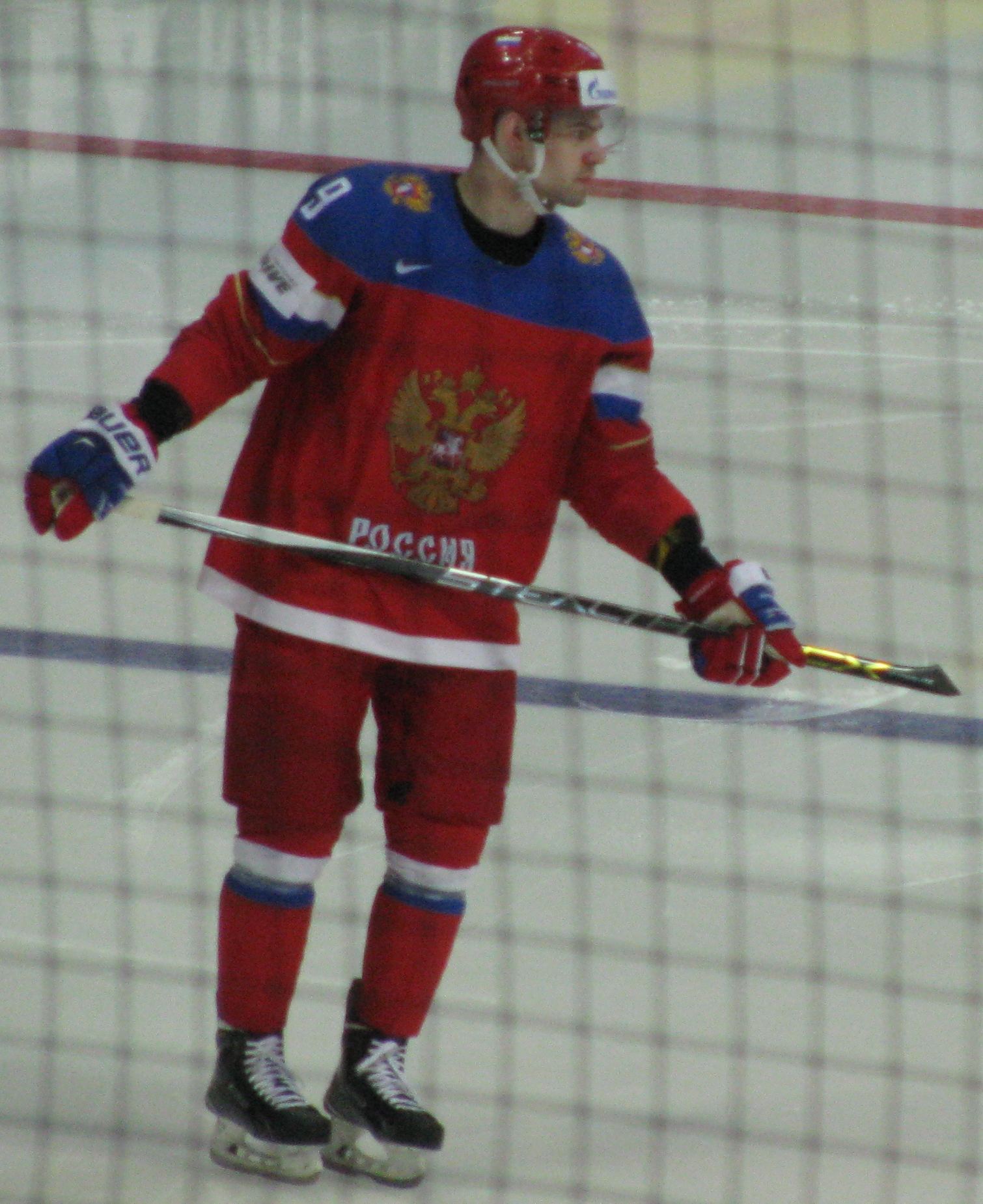
- Born: 6 December 1992 (age 33) Oskemen, Kazakhstan
- Height: 5 ft 11 in (180 cm)
- Weight: 176 lb (80 kg; 12 st 8 lb)
- Position: Defence
- Shoots: Left
- KHL team Former teams: Free agent Metallurg Magnitogorsk; Buffalo Sabres; SKA Saint Petersburg; HC Vityaz; Salavat Yulaev Ufa; Traktor Chelyabinsk; Barys Astana; Lada Togliatti; Amur Khabarovsk
- National team: Russia
- NHL draft: Undrafted
- Playing career: 2011–present

Victor Vladimirovich Antipin (Cyrillic: Виктор Владимирович Антипин; born 6 December 1992) is a Kazakh-born Russian professional ice hockey defenceman who is currently an unrestricted free agent. He most recently played under contract with Amur Khabarovsk in the Kontinental Hockey League (KHL). He has previously played in the National Hockey League (NHL) with the Buffalo Sabres. He is the son of Vladimir Antipin.

== Playing career ==
Antipin joined the youth team of Metallurg Magnitogorsk as a 16-year-old in the 2008–09 season. He made his debut in the Kontinental Hockey League on the blueline with Magnitogorsk in the 2010–11 season, appearing in 2 games.

After six seasons and two Gagarin Cups with Metallurg Magnitogorsk, following the 2016–17 season, Antipin terminated his contract with the club in order to pursue his NHL ambitions on 1 May 2017. He later signed a one-year, entry-level contract with the Buffalo Sabres on 25 May 2017. Antipin recorded his first NHL point on 24 October 2017 against the Detroit Red Wings. Antipin missed 13 games in January due to an illness. On 31 March 2018 Antipin was hit by Nashville Predators forward Scott Hartnell, suffering a concussion and broken nose from the hit. He was ruled out indefinitely for the rest of the season.

As a restricted free agent, Antipin was not qualified by the Sabres due to his falling on the depth chart. On 2 July 2018, Antipin opted to return to former club, Metallurg Magnitogorsk of the KHL, agreeing to an optional three-year contract.

After two seasons in his return to Magnitogorsk, Antipin left as a free agent and signed an improved two-year contract with SKA Saint Petersburg on 7 May 2020.

Following his first full season with SKA Saint Petersburg in 2020–21, Antipin was traded, alongside Miro Aaltonen, to HC Vityaz in exchange for four prospects on 15 June 2021. Antipin began the 2021–22 season with Vityaz, posting 3 assists through 28 games before he was again on the move after he was traded to Salavat Yulaev Ufa in exchange for Yevgeni Lisovets on 19 November 2021.

On 8 May 2023, Antipin was signed as a free agent to a one-year contract with Traktor Chelyabinsk for the 2023–24 season. After a lone season in Chelyabinsk, Antipin left at the conclusion of his contract and went on to play in his home country, Kazakhstan, for the first time. He joined Barys Astana of the KHL on a one-year contract, on 23 August 2024.

== International play ==
Antipin played the 2009 World Junior A Challenge where he won the bronze medal with the Russian U18 team. He later played for Russian U18 national team in the 2010 IIHF World U18 Championships where the team finished in fourth place. Antipin played for the silver medal-winning Russian U20 national team in the 2012 World Junior Ice Hockey Championships, and later played for Russian men's national team in 2015, 2016 and 2017 world championships.

== Career statistics ==
=== Regular season and playoffs ===
			Regular season					Playoffs
Season	Team	League	GP	G	A	Pts	PIM	GP	G	A	Pts	PIM
2009–10	Stalnye Lisy	MHL	39	2	9	11	22	5	0	0	0	2
2010–11	Stalnye Lisy	MHL	44	4	10	14	68	17	4	2	6	8
2010–11	Metallurg Magnitogorsk	KHL	2	0	0	0	0	—	—	—	—	—
2011–12	Stalnye Lisy	MHL	40	6	19	25	18	11	2	4	6	0
2012–13	Metallurg Magnitogorsk	KHL	50	10	11	21	8	7	1	2	3	0
2013–14	Metallurg Magnitogorsk	KHL	45	9	8	17	16	21	4	5	9	25
2014–15	Metallurg Magnitogorsk	KHL	54	5	16	21	4	10	2	5	7	0
2015–16	Metallurg Magnitogorsk	KHL	56	6	9	15	8	23	3	4	7	8
2016–17	Metallurg Magnitogorsk	KHL	59	6	18	24	8	18	7	4	11	2
2017–18	Buffalo Sabres	NHL	47	0	10	10	18	—	—	—	—	—
2018–19	Metallurg Magnitogorsk	KHL	55	11	16	27	8	6	0	3	3	4
2019–20	Metallurg Magnitogorsk	KHL	60	5	14	19	10	5	0	0	0	2
2020–21	SKA Saint Petersburg	KHL	53	2	9	11	10	15	0	1	1	2
2021–22	HC Vityaz	KHL	28	0	3	3	10	—	—	—	—	—
2021–22	Salavat Yulaev Ufa	KHL	14	0	1	1	4	4	0	1	1	2
2022–23	Salavat Yulaev Ufa	KHL	59	1	7	8	10	6	0	0	0	0
2023–24	Traktor Chelyabinsk	KHL	55	4	13	17	10	14	1	2	3	6
2024–25	Barys Astana	KHL	24	1	5	6	4	—	—	—	—	—
2025–26	Lada Togliatti	KHL	23	0	3	3	7	—	—	—	—	—
2025–26	Amur Khabarovsk	KHL	6	0	0	0	2	—	—	—	—	—
KHL totals			643	60	133	193	119	129	18	27	45	51
NHL totals			47	0	10	10	18	—	—	—	—	—

Medal record

Representing Russia

Ice hockey

World Championships
Silver medal – second place	2015 Czech Republic	
Bronze medal – third place	2016 Russia	
Bronze medal – third place	2017 Germany/France	

World Junior Championships
Silver medal – second place	2012 Canada	

=== International ===
Year	Team	Event	Result	GP	G	A	Pts	PIM
2010	Russia	WJC18	4th	7	1	1	2	6
2012	Russia	WJC	2nd place, silver medalist(s)	7	0	2	2	2
2015	Russia	WC	2nd place, silver medalist(s)	10	0	3	3	2
2016	Russia	WC	3rd place, bronze medalist(s)	6	0	1	1	6
2017	Russia	WC	3rd place, bronze medalist(s)	10	0	4	4	0
Junior totals				14	1	3	4	8
Senior totals				26	0	8	8	8

== Awards and honors ==
Award	Year
MHL
All-Star Game	2011
KHL
All-Star Game	2013
Gagarin Cup	2014, 2016
Gentleman Award	2015
