= Michal Murček =

Slovak ice hockey player

- Born: 29 January 1992 (age 34) Martin, Czechoslovakia
- Height: 5 ft 11 in (180 cm)
- Weight: 181 lb (82 kg; 12 st 13 lb)
- Position: Centre
- Shoots: Left
- Slovak 1. Liga team Former teams: HK Martin; MHK Dolný Kubín; HK Orange 20; HC Prievidza; HKM Zvolen; Nynäshamns IF; Nacka HK; Moss Hockey; HK Poprad; HC 07 Detva; HC Košice; MHk 32 Liptovský Mikuláš
- Playing career: 2009–present

Michal Murček (born 29 January 1992) is former Slovak professional ice hockey player in the past playing for example for HK Martin of the Slovak 1. Liga.

== Career statistics ==
=== Regular season and playoffs ===
| | | | Regular season | | | | | Playoffs |
| Season | Team | League | GP | G | A | Pts | PIM | GP | G | A | Pts | PIM |

=== International ===
| Year | Team | Event | Result | GP | G | A | Pts | PIM |
|---|---|---|---|---|---|---|---|---|
| 2010 | Slovakia | WJC18 | 8th | 6 | 1 | 1 | 2 | 2 |
| Junior totals | | | | 6 | 1 | 1 | 2 | 2 |
