= Jonathan Iilahti =

Finnish ice hockey player and coach

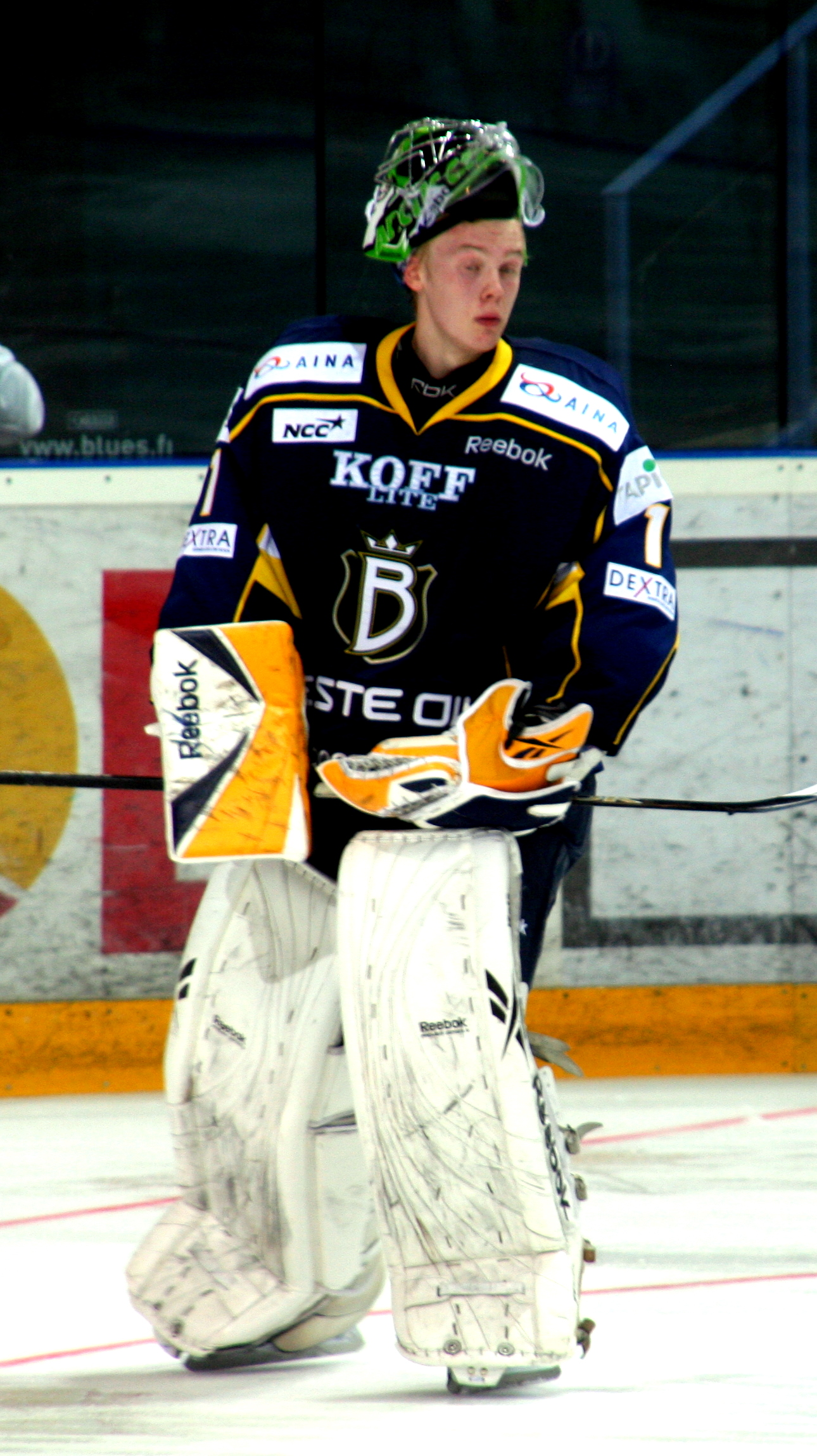
- Born: 27 April 1992 (age 34) Vaasa, Finland
- Height: 6 ft 1 in (185 cm)
- Weight: 176 lb (80 kg; 12 st 8 lb)
- Played for: Blues; Timrå IK; Sport; KalPa
- NHL draft: 175th overall, 2010; Vancouver Canucks
- Playing career: 2011–2021

Jonathan Iilahti (born 27 April 1992) is a Finnish ice hockey coach and former goaltender, currently serving as the goaltending coach of Vaasan Sport Naiset in the Naisten Liiga and as the Vaasan Sportin Juniorit director of coaching for the under-15 to under-19 age group.

== Career ==
He belonged to the same Espoo Blues junior ice hockey program as Mikko Koskinen. Iliahti would be selected 175th overall by the Vancouver Canucks in the 2010 NHL entry draft and then selected 39th overall by the Vancouver Giants in the 2011 CHL Import Draft. However, he chose to remain in Finland.

He made his SM-liiga debut for Blues during the 2011–12 SM-liiga season. After a spell in the second-tier Mestis with Sport, Iilahti moved to Sweden in 2013, joining Timrå IK of the second-tier HockeyAllsvenskan. After two seasons, he dropped down to the third-tier Hockeyettan with spells at Tranås AIF and Södertälje SK. He then had a brief spell back at HockeyAllsvenskan for Modo Hockey before returning to Finland with Mestis team Jokipojat.

Iilahti made a return to Finland's top-tier league, now known as Liiga, during the 2017–18 Liiga season with Sport, playing 16 games. He spent the 2018–19 season with KalPa of Liiga and IPK of Mestis.

== Career statistics ==
| Season | Team | League | GP | MIN | GA | SO | GAA | SV% |
|---|---|---|---|---|---|---|---|---|
| 2011–12 | Blues | SM-liiga | 4 | 160 | 9 | 0 | 3.38 | .889 |
| 2011–12 | Sport | Mestis | 12 | 733 | 22 | 2 | 1.80 | .934 |
| 2012–13 | Sport | Mestis | 24 | 1362 | 61 | 0 | 2.69 | .898 |
| 2013–14 | Timrå IK | HockeyAllsvenskan | 21 | 1222 | 42 | 4 | 2.06 | .918 |
| 2014–15 | Timrå IK | HockeyAllsvenskan | 2 | 100 | 3 | 0 | 1.80 | .937 |
| 2015–16 | Tranås AIF | Hockeyettan | 2 | - | - | - | 3.04 | .897 |
| 2015–16 | Södertälje SK | Hockeyettan | 3 | - | - | - | 3.34 | .907 |
| 2016–17 | Jokipojat | Mestis | - | - | - | - | - | - |

Jonathan Iilahti
Medal record

Representing Finland

Ice hockey

IIHF World U18 Championships
| Bronze medal – third place | 2010 Belarus | |
