= Dávid Bondra =

American-Slovak ice hockey player

- Born: 26 August 1992 (age 33) Annapolis, Maryland, U.S.
- Height: 180 cm (5 ft 11 in)
- Weight: 86 kg (190 lb; 13 st 8 lb)
- Position: Right wing
- Shot: Left
- Played for: HK Poprad; Kunlun Red Star; HC Kometa Brno; Bratislava Capitals
- National team: Slovakia
- Playing career: 2016–2022

Dávid Bondra (born 26 August 1992) is an American-born Slovak former professional ice hockey player.

== Personal life ==
Bondra was born in Annapolis, Maryland, when his father, Peter, was a member of the Washington Capitals. He spent the majority of his youth in the United States where his father played for a multitude of teams.

== Playing career ==
=== College ===
Dávid was a forward at Michigan State University for the Spartans men's ice hockey team. He scored 1 goal over his Michigan State tenure, and was able to tack up 48 healthy scratches. His brother, Nick, was beginning his collegiate career at Amherst College in 2017.

=== Professional ===
Bondra was selected 21st overall in the 2010 KHL draft. Bondra made his professional debut playing for HK Poprad of the Slovak Tipsport Liga. Bondra retired from professional hockey in 2022.

== International play ==
Bondra also played for Slovakia in the 2018 Men's World Ice Hockey Championships. He was not selected to play for the Slovak Olympic team, which won the bronze medal in the 2022 Winter Olympics.

== Career statistics ==
=== Regular season and playoffs ===
			Regular season					Playoffs
Season	Team	League	GP	G	A	Pts	PIM	GP	G	A	Pts	PIM
2005–06	Washington Little Caps 16U	AYHL 16U	5	5	2	7	4	—	—	—	—	—
2006–07	Team Maryland Bantam Major	AYBHL	22	17	15	32	20	—	—	—	—	—
2007–08	Team Maryland 16U	AYHL 16U	22	6	13	19	2	—	—	—	—	—
2008–09	Washington Jr. Nationals	AtJHL	38	13	4	17	22	—	—	—	—	—
2009–10	Washington Jr. Nationals	AtJHL	40	22	29	51	44	2	0	0	0	2
2010–11	Chicago Steel	USHL	58	4	5	9	18	—	—	—	—	—
2011–12	Chilliwack Chiefs	BCHL	59	22	41	63	37	6	0	1	1	4
2012–13	Michigan State Univ.	NCAA	35	0	3	3	10	—	—	—	—	—
2013–14	Michigan State Univ.	NCAA	5	1	0	1	2	—	—	—	—	—
2014–15	Michigan State Univ.	NCAA	15	0	1	1	4	—	—	—	—	—
2015–16	Michigan State Univ.	NCAA	13	0	0	0	2	—	—	—	—	—
2016–17	HK Poprad	Slovak	52	9	11	20	14	4	0	0	0	2
2017–18	HK Poprad	Slovak	53	6	12	18	32	4	1	1	2	12
2018–19	HK Poprad	Slovak	53	22	13	35	34	12	2	4	6	4
2019–20	Kunlun Red Star	KHL	18	1	2	3	6	—	—	—	—	—
2020–21	Kunlun Red Star	KHL	15	1	1	2	2	—	—	—	—	—
2020–21	HC Kometa Brno	Czech	30	4	2	6	18	9	0	1	1	24
2021–22	Bratislava Capitals	ICEHL	13	3	2	5	27	—	—	—	—	—
2021–22	HK Poprad	Slovak	32	9	8	17	32	7	0	1	1	6
KHL totals			33	2	3	5	8	—	—	—	—	—
Slovak totals			190	46	44	90	112	27	3	6	9	24

=== International ===
Year	Team	Event	Result	GP	G	A	Pts	PIM
2009	Slovakia	U17	8th	5	1	3	4	8
2010	Slovakia	WJC18	8th	6	0	3	3	16
2018	Slovakia	WC	9th	7	1	1	2	0
2019	Slovakia	WC	9th	2	1	0	1	0
Junior totals				11	1	6	7	24
Senior totals				9	2	1	3	0
