= Peter Trška =

Slovak ice hockey player

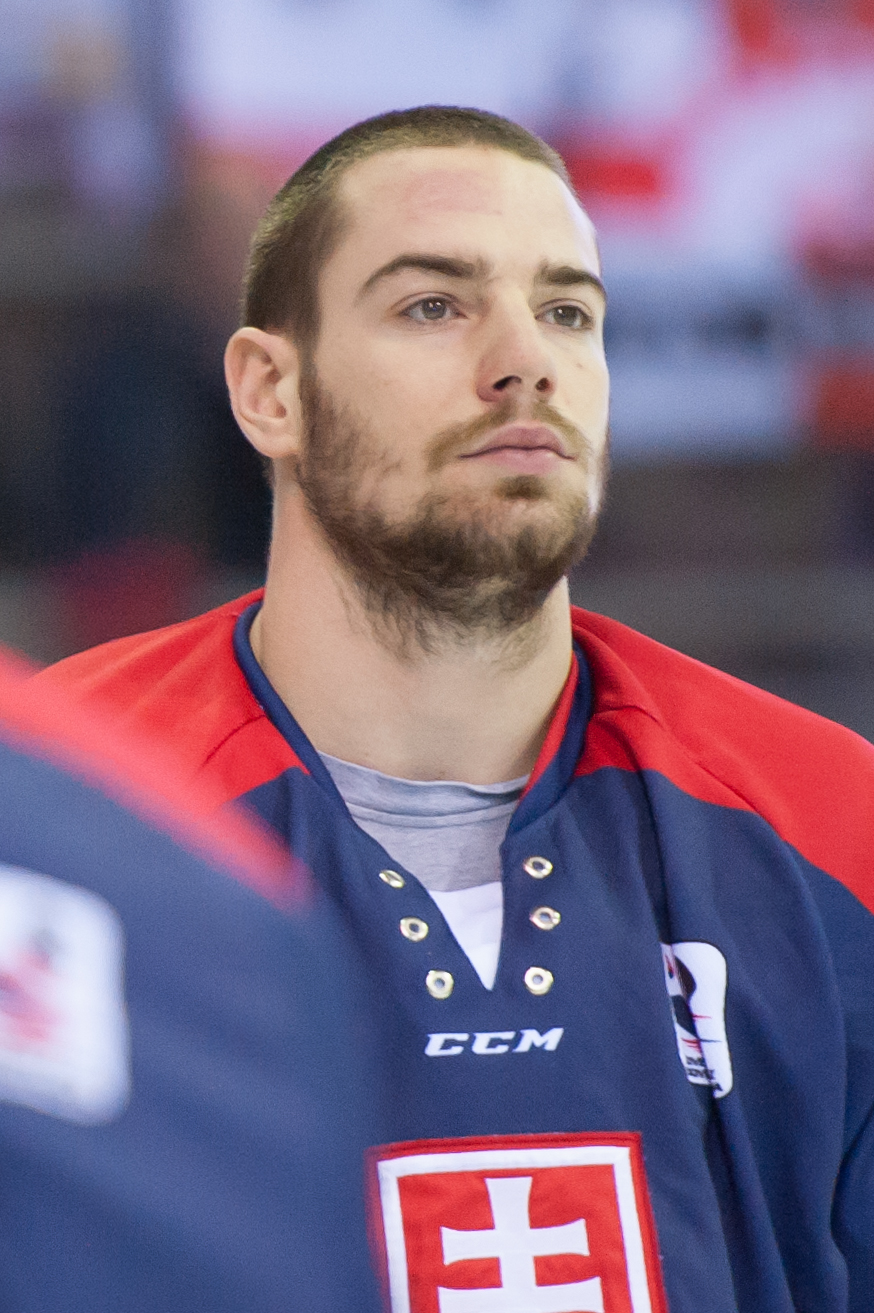
- Born: 1 June 1992 (age 32); Dubnica nad Váhom, Czechoslovakia
- Height: 6 ft 0 in (183 cm)
- Weight: 194 lb (88 kg; 13 st 12 lb)
- Position: Defence
- Shoots: Left
- DEL2 team Former teams: Selber Wölfe; Fischtown Pinguins; VHK Vsetín; HC Slovan Bratislava; HK Orange 20; HK 36 Skalica; BK Mladá Boleslav; HC Benátky nad Jizerou; HC Kometa Brno; HC Vítkovice Ridera; PSG Berani Zlín
- National team: Slovakia
- NHL draft: Undrafted
- Playing career: 2009–present

Peter Trška (born 1 June 1992) is a Slovak professional ice hockey defenceman who currently plays for Selber Wölfe of the Deutsche Eishockey Liga 2 (DEL2).

== Career statistics ==
=== Regular season and playoffs ===
			Regular season					Playoffs
Season	Team	League	GP	G	A	Pts	PIM	GP	G	A	Pts	PIM

=== International ===
Year	Team	Event	Result	GP	G	A	Pts	PIM
2010	Slovakia	WJC18	8th	6	1	2	3	8
2011	Slovakia	WJC	8th	6	0	0	0	4
2012	Slovakia	WJC	6th	6	0	0	0	6
2017	Slovakia	WC	14th	6	0	0	0	8
Junior totals				18	1	2	3	18
Senior totals				6	0	0	0	8
