= Adam Pettersson =

Swedish ice hockey player

- Born: January 13, 1992 (age 34) Skellefteå, Sweden
- Height: 6 ft 0 in (183 cm)
- Weight: 186 lb (84 kg; 13 st 4 lb)
- Position: Centre
- Shot: Left
- Played for: Skellefteå AIK; Brynäs IF; MoDo Hockey
- Playing career: 2009–2024

Adam Pettersson (born January 13, 1992) is a Swedish former professional ice hockey player. He most recently played with MoDo Hockey then of the Swedish Hockey League (SHL).

== Playing career ==
The Central Scouting Bureau ranked Pettersson ninth among European Skaters for the 2010 NHL entry draft, however he went undrafted. Pettersson spent the first 10 years of his professional career within hometown club, Skellefteå AIK of the SHL, before leaving as a free agent following the 2019–20 season.

On 14 April 2020, he agreed to a two-year contract to continue in the SHL with Brynäs IF.

In July 2025, Pettersson announced his retirement after missing the 2024-25 season with injury.

== Career statistics ==
=== Regular season and playoffs ===
			Regular season					Playoffs
Season	Team	League	GP	G	A	Pts	PIM	GP	G	A	Pts	PIM
2007–08	Skellefteå AIK	J20	4	0	1	1	2	—	—	—	—	—
2008–09	Skellefteå AIK	J20	28	5	9	14	24	5	0	0	0	2
2009–10	Skellefteå AIK	J20	37	11	20	31	40	4	0	0	0	6
2009–10	Skellefteå AIK	SEL	8	0	0	0	0	—	—	—	—	—
2010–11	Skellefteå AIK	J20	24	8	9	17	49	5	2	1	3	2
2010–11	Skellefteå AIK	SEL	22	1	1	2	2	1	0	0	0	0
2010–11	IF Sundsvall Hockey	Allsv	11	3	0	3	2	—	—	—	—	—
2011–12	IF Sundsvall Hockey	Allsv	52	10	19	29	81	10	3	5	8	28
2011–12	Skellefteå AIK	SEL	—	—	—	—	—	2	0	0	0	0
2012–13	Skellefteå AIK	SEL	53	3	4	7	24	12	0	1	1	2
2013–14	Skellefteå AIK	SHL	49	3	7	10	16	14	1	2	3	33
2014–15	Skellefteå AIK	SHL	53	8	14	22	18	11	0	0	0	0
2015–16	Skellefteå AIK	SHL	52	8	14	22	12	12	0	1	1	6
2016–17	Skellefteå AIK	SHL	51	7	13	20	22	7	0	2	2	2
2017–18	Skellefteå AIK	SHL	52	10	13	23	28	14	1	2	3	4
2018–19	Skellefteå AIK	SHL	52	5	12	17	18	6	0	1	1	0
2019–20	Skellefteå AIK	SHL	52	5	8	13	30	—	—	—	—	—
2020–21	Brynäs IF	SHL	42	5	8	13	14	—	—	—	—	—
2021–22	Brynäs IF	SHL	46	4	4	8	12	3	0	0	0	4
2022–23	MoDo Hockey	Allsv	48	7	20	27	28	17	2	5	7	6
2023–24	MoDo Hockey	SHL	45	2	2	4	20	—	—	—	—	—
SHL totals			577	61	100	161	216	82	2	9	11	51

Medal record

Representing Sweden

IIHF World U18 Championships
Silver medal – second place	2010 Belarus	

=== International ===
Year	Team	Event	Result	GP	G	A	Pts	PIM
2010	Sweden	U18	2nd place, silver medalist(s)	6	0	1	1	4
Junior totals				6	0	1	1	4

== Awards and honors ==
Award	Year
SHL
Le Mat Trophy (Skellefteå AIK)	2013, 2014
