= Connor Brickley =

American ice hockey player (born 1992)

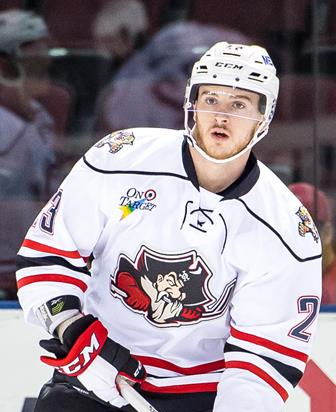
- Born: February 25, 1992 (age 34) Everett, Massachusetts, U.S.
- Height: 5 ft 10 in (178 cm)
- Weight: 203 lb (92 kg; 14 st 7 lb)
- Position: Center
- Shot: Left
- Played for: Florida Panthers; New York Rangers; EC Red Bull Salzburg
- NHL draft: 50th overall, 2010; Florida Panthers
- Playing career: 2014–2020

Connor Brickley (born February 25, 1992) is an American former professional hockey center, who played with the Florida Panthers and the New York Rangers in the National Hockey League (NHL). He was selected in the second round, 50th overall, by the Florida Panthers in the 2010 NHL entry draft.

== Playing career ==
After playing junior hockey with the Des Moines Buccaneers and the U.S. National Development Team in the United States Hockey League, Brickley committed to a collegiate career with the University of Vermont of the Hockey East.

Upon completion of his senior year with the Catamounts, he was immediately assigned to the Panthers' AHL affiliate, the San Antonio Rampage on an amateur try-out contract to make his professional debut to end the 2013–14 season. Brickley was signed to a two-year entry-level contract with the Florida Panthers on April 21, 2014.

In his first full professional season with the Rampage in the 2014–15 season, Brickley adapted quickly the professional circuit in amassing 22 goals and 47 points in 73 games. After a strong off-season of development, Brickley impressed at his second Panthers training camp and made the club's opening night roster to begin the 2015–16 season. He made his NHL debut with the Panthers in a 7-1 victory over the Philadelphia Flyers on October 10, 2015. In his third game, Brickley recorded his first NHL goal, and point, in a 4-1 victory over the Carolina Hurricanes on October 13, 2015.

Approaching the beginning of the 2016–17 season, Brickley was traded by the Panthers to the Carolina Hurricanes in exchange for Brody Sutter on October 11, 2016. He was directly assigned to AHL affiliate, the Charlotte Checkers. Over the duration of the season, Brickley posted 15 goals and 26 points in 69 games with the Checkers.

On June 21, 2017, Brickley was selected from the Hurricanes at the 2017 NHL Expansion Draft by the Vegas Golden Knights. The Hurricanes also dealt a fifth-round selection in 2017 to Vegas in order for Brickley to be the agreed choice as he was a pending unrestricted free agent. On July 1, he returned to the Panthers on a one-year, two-way contract. Brickley returned to the NHL in the 2017–18 season, remaining on the roster for the full season. In 44 games with the Panthers and used in a checking line role, Brickley scored 4 goals and 12 points.

As a free agent at the conclusion of his contract, Brickley left the Panthers to sign a one-year, two-way contract with the Nashville Predators on July 1, 2018. After attending the Predators training camp, Brickley was assigned to begin the 2018–19 season with AHL affiliate, the Milwaukee Admirals. In a top-nine forward role, Brickley posted 7 goals and 11 points in 39 games with the Admirals, before he was traded by the Predators to the New York Rangers in exchange for Cole Schneider on January 14, 2019.

As a member of the New York Rangers, Brickley played 14 games, with 1 goal and 3 assists. His lone NHL goal of the 2018–19 season came against the Carolina Hurricanes on February 19.

Unable to garner another NHL contract as a free agent from the Rangers, Brickley went un-signed over the summer before opting to play in Europe by agreeing to a one-year contract with Austrian club, EC Red Bull Salzburg of the EBEL, on October 26, 2019.

== Personal ==
Brickley is the son of Robin and Craig Brickley, who played collegiate hockey with the University of Pennsylvania in the 1970s. He is the cousin of Boston Bruins longtime broadcasting announcer and former NHL player Andy Brickley. He is also a cousin of Daniel Brickley.

On November 9, 2021, Brickley was named the head coach of Nauset Regional High School's boys hockey program, in North Eastham, Massachusetts.

He joined the Chatham Fire Department on March 21, 2022.

== Career statistics ==
=== Regular season and playoffs ===
			Regular season					Playoffs
Season	Team	League	GP	G	A	Pts	PIM	GP	G	A	Pts	PIM
2008–09	Belmont Hill School	USHS	30	17	18	35	60	—	—	—	—	—
2009–10	Des Moines Buccaneers	USHL	52	22	21	43	68	—	—	—	—	—
2009–10	U.S. National Development Team	USDP	14	2	5	7	6	—	—	—	—	—
2010–11	University of Vermont	HE	35	4	9	13	33	—	—	—	—	—
2011–12	University of Vermont	HE	23	9	3	12	16	—	—	—	—	—
2012–13	University of Vermont	HE	24	3	5	8	31	—	—	—	—	—
2013–14	University of Vermont	HE	35	5	10	15	49	—	—	—	—	—
2013–14	San Antonio Rampage	AHL	8	1	1	2	4	—	—	—	—	—
2014–15	San Antonio Rampage	AHL	73	22	25	47	66	3	1	1	2	0
2015–16	Florida Panthers	NHL	23	1	4	5	14	—	—	—	—	—
2015–16	Portland Pirates	AHL	45	12	15	27	26	5	0	1	1	2
2016–17	Charlotte Checkers	AHL	69	15	11	26	57	5	2	2	4	0
2017–18	Florida Panthers	NHL	44	4	8	12	19	—	—	—	—	—
2018–19	Milwaukee Admirals	AHL	39	7	4	11	18	—	—	—	—	—
2018–19	Hartford Wolf Pack	AHL	13	2	4	6	2	—	—	—	—	—
2018–19	New York Rangers	NHL	14	1	3	4	9	—	—	—	—	—
2019–20	EC Red Bull Salzburg	EBEL	33	15	11	26	18	3	1	2	3	2
NHL totals			81	6	15	21	42	—	—	—	—	—

=== International ===
Year	Team	Event	Result	GP	G	A	Pts	PIM
2010	United States	U18	1st place, gold medalist(s)	7	0	4	4	4
2012	United States	WJC	7th	3	0	0	0	0
Junior totals				10	0	4	4	4
