= Ludvig Rensfeldt =

Swedish ice hockey player (born 1992)

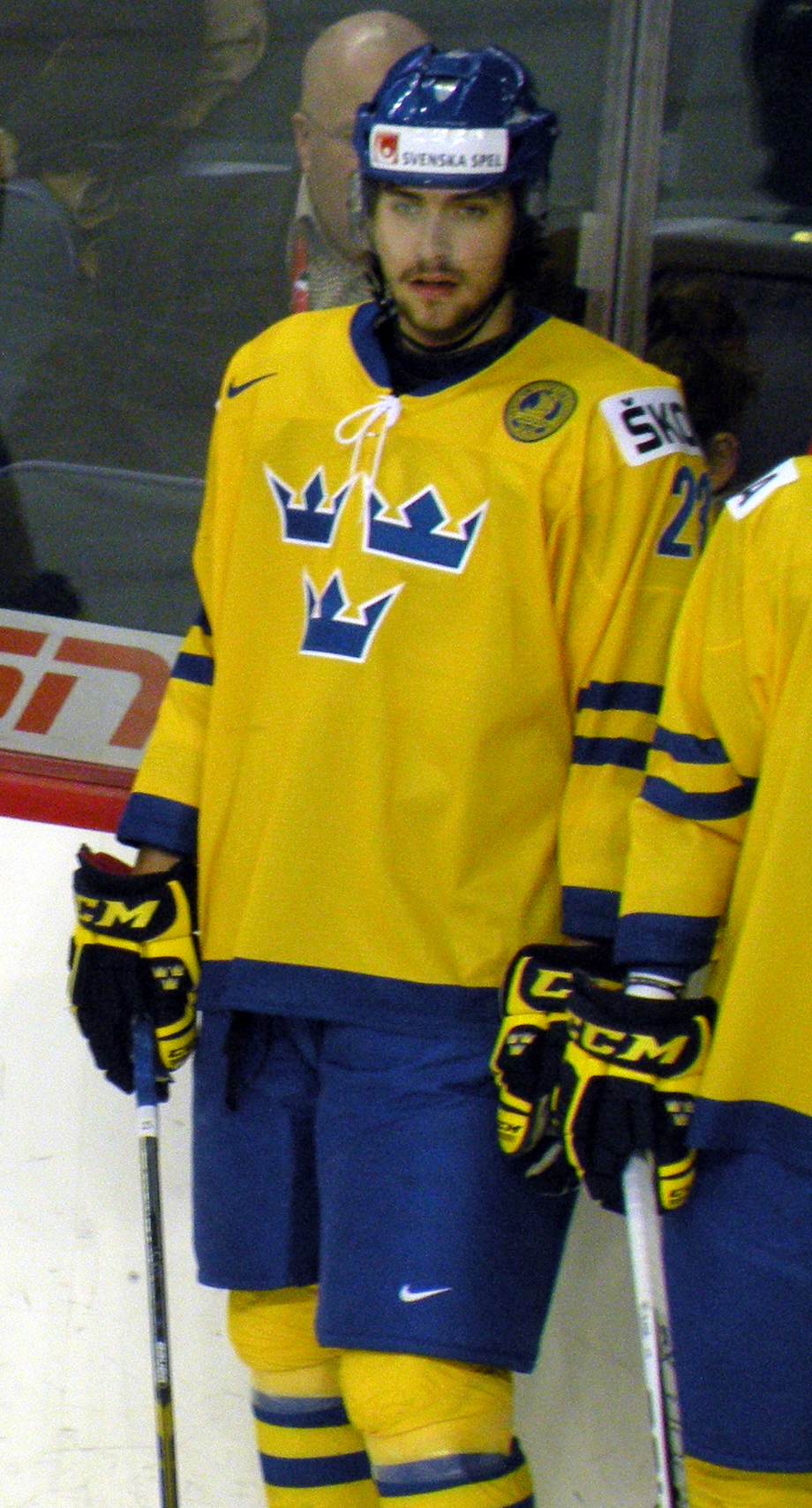
- Ludvig Rensfeldt with Sweden during the 2012 World Junior Championship in Calgary, Alberta, Canada
- Born: January 29, 1992 (age 34) Gävle, Sweden
- Height: 6 ft 3 in (191 cm)
- Weight: 198 lb (90 kg; 14 st 2 lb)
- Position: Left Wing
- Shoots: Left
- SHL team Former teams: Djurgårdens IF; Brynäs IF; Rögle BK; Timrå IK; Örebro HK
- NHL draft: 35th overall, 2010; Chicago Blackhawks
- Playing career: 2010–present

Ludvig Rensfeldt (born January 29, 1992) is a Swedish ice hockey player, currently playing with Djurgårdens IF in the Swedish Hockey League (SHL). He was drafted in the second round, 35th overall by the Chicago Blackhawks as the first Swedish player selected in the 2010 NHL entry draft.

== Playing career ==
Rensfeldt recorded his first Elitserien point with Brynäs IF on November 25, 2010 with an assist on a goal by Alexander Sundström.

Rensfeldt played for Sarnia Sting of the Ontario Hockey League (OHL) during the 2011–12 season, scoring 22 goals and 43 points in 58 games. In the OHL playoffs he scored 5 points in 6 games before the Sarnia Sting team was eliminated in the Conference Quarter-finals.

Following the 2018–19 season, having played with Timrå IK in their lone season stint in the SHL, Rensfeldt left the club upon relegation and continued in the SHL in signing a two-year contract with Örebro HK on 27 May 2019.

== International play ==
Medal record

Representing Sweden

Ice hockey

World Junior Championships
| Gold medal – first place | 2012 Calgary | |

In the 2010 U18 World Junior Championships, Sweden got a silver medal after losing the finals against the United States. Ludvig finished fourth in the tournament in points, second on his team in points to Brynäs teammate Johan Larsson.

== Career statistics ==
=== Regular season and playoffs ===
| | | | Regular season | | | | | Playoffs |
| Season | Team | League | GP | G | A | Pts | PIM | GP | G | A | Pts | PIM |
|---|---|---|---|---|---|---|---|---|---|---|---|---|
| 2008–09 | Brynäs IF | J20 | 2 | 0 | 0 | 0 | 2 | 1 | 0 | 0 | 0 | 0 |
| 2009–10 | Brynäs IF | J20 | 39 | 21 | 29 | 50 | 37 | 5 | 3 | 0 | 3 | 0 |
| 2010–11 | Brynäs IF | J20 | 26 | 17 | 19 | 36 | 12 | 1 | 0 | 0 | 0 | 0 |
| 2010–11 | Brynäs IF | SEL | 16 | 0 | 1 | 1 | 0 | 5 | 0 | 0 | 0 | 2 |
| 2010–11 | Bofors IK | Allsv | 11 | 5 | 2 | 7 | 4 | — | — | — | — | — |
| 2011–12 | Sarnia Sting | OHL | 58 | 22 | 21 | 43 | 18 | 4 | 2 | 2 | 4 | 0 |
| 2012–13 | Malmö Redhawks | Allsv | 52 | 9 | 30 | 39 | 32 | — | — | — | — | — |
| 2013–14 | Malmö Redhawks | Allsv | 47 | 7 | 7 | 14 | 14 | 10 | 1 | 0 | 1 | 2 |
| 2014–15 | Rögle BK | Allsv | 48 | 16 | 11 | 27 | 12 | 10 | 3 | 6 | 9 | 2 |
| 2015–16 | Rögle BK | SHL | 52 | 15 | 12 | 27 | 16 | — | — | — | — | — |
| 2016–17 | Rögle BK | SHL | 48 | 13 | 18 | 31 | 10 | — | — | — | — | — |
| 2017–18 | Rögle BK | SHL | 52 | 10 | 14 | 24 | 22 | — | — | — | — | — |
| 2018–19 | Timrå IK | SHL | 49 | 9 | 16 | 25 | 10 | — | — | — | — | — |
| 2019–20 | Örebro HK | SHL | 52 | 8 | 7 | 15 | 12 | — | — | — | — | — |
| 2020–21 | Örebro HK | SHL | 50 | 8 | 12 | 20 | 36 | 9 | 0 | 0 | 0 | 8 |
| 2021–22 | Djurgårdens IF | SHL | 52 | 14 | 17 | 31 | 24 | — | — | — | — | — |
| 2022–23 | Djurgårdens IF | Allsv | 41 | 9 | 15 | 24 | 16 | 17 | 1 | 3 | 4 | 4 |
| 2023–24 | Djurgårdens IF | Allsv | 51 | 8 | 16 | 24 | 18 | 15 | 6 | 4 | 10 | 6 |
| 2024–25 | Djurgårdens IF | Allsv | 52 | 9 | 11 | 20 | 16 | 16 | 1 | 8 | 9 | 2 |
| SHL totals | | | 371 | 77 | 97 | 174 | 130 | 14 | 0 | 0 | 0 | 10 |

=== International ===
| Year | Team | Event | Result | GP | G | A | Pts | PIM |
|---|---|---|---|---|---|---|---|---|
| 2010 | Sweden | U18 | 2nd place, silver medalist(s) | 6 | 6 | 6 | 12 | 4 |
| 2012 | Sweden | WJC | 1st place, gold medalist(s) | 6 | 1 | 5 | 6 | 6 |
| Junior totals | | | | 12 | 7 | 11 | 18 | 10 |

== Awards and honors ==
| Award | Year |
|---|---|
SHL
| Rookie of the Year | 2016 |

Awards and achievements
| Preceded by Marcus Sörensen | Winner of the SHL Rookie of the Year award 2016 | Succeeded by Andreas Borgman |
