= Emil Galimov =

Russian ice hockey player (born 1992)

- Born: 9 May 1992 (age 34) Nizhnekamsk, Russia
- Height: 6 ft 2 in (188 cm)
- Weight: 179 lb (81 kg; 12 st 11 lb)
- Position: Forward
- Shoots: Left
- VHL team Former teams: Metallurg Novokuznetsk; Neftekhimik Nizhnekamsk; Lokomotiv Yaroslavl; Ak Bars Kazan; SKA Saint Petersburg; Avangard Omsk; Barys Astana
- National team: Russia
- NHL draft: 207th overall, 2013; San Jose Sharks
- Playing career: 2010–present

Emil Galimov (Tatar: Эмиль Габделнур улы Галимов, born 9 May 1992) is a Russian professional ice hockey player of Tatar descent. He is currently playing with Metallurg Novokuznetsk of the Supreme Hockey League (VHL). Galimov was selected by the San Jose Sharks in the 7th round (207th overall) of the 2013 NHL entry draft.

== Playing career ==
Galimov made his Kontinental Hockey League debut playing with HC Neftekhimik Nizhnekamsk during the 2010–11 KHL season.

Galimov moved to Lokomotiv Yaroslavl, spending six seasons with the club, before he was traded in a return for a second stint with his original club, Neftekhimik Nizhnekamsk prior to the 2017–18 season on August 16, 2017. In the 2018–19 season, Galimov was selected to captain Nizhnekamsk, posting 8 goals and 15 points in 50 games.

On May 6, 2019, Galimov left Nizhnekamsk for the second occasion, signing a one-year contract as a free agent with Ak Bars Kazan. In the 2019–20 season, Galimov rebounded offensively in Kazan, recording 14 goals in 47 games. He registered 3 post-season goals in just 4 games before the season was cancelled due to COVID-19.

On May 1, 2020, Galimov agreed to a two-year contract as a free agent with SKA Saint Petersburg. In 2022 Galimov signed a four-year contract with SKA.

After a brief stint with Avangard Omsk, Galimov was signed to a one-year contract with Barys Astana for the 2025–26 season on 11 August 2025.

== Career statistics ==
=== Regular season and playoffs ===
			Regular season					Playoffs
Season	Team	League	GP	G	A	Pts	PIM	GP	G	A	Pts	PIM
2009–10	Reaktor	MHL	32	6	4	10	69	1	0	1	1	0
2010–11	Reaktor	MHL	27	11	7	18	34	5	3	0	3	27
2010–11	Neftekhimik Nizhnekamsk	KHL	18	1	1	2	4	—	—	—	—	—
2011–12	Reaktor	MHL	9	5	4	9	33	—	—	—	—	—
2011–12	Neftekhimik Nizhnekamsk	KHL	8	0	0	0	2	—	—	—	—	—
2011–12	Lokomotiv Yaroslavl	VHL	17	9	4	13	12	10	2	3	5	10
2011–12	Loko Yaroslavl	MHL	8	4	5	9	2	—	—	—	—	—
2012–13	Lokomotiv Yaroslavl	KHL	33	7	13	20	10	6	0	2	2	6
2012–13	Lokomotiv Yaroslavl-2	VHL	5	4	1	5	4	—	—	—	—	—
2012–13	Loko Yaroslavl	MHL	2	1	1	2	2	—	—	—	—	—
2013–14	Lokomotiv Yaroslavl	KHL	43	6	5	11	24	18	1	3	4	8
2014–15	Lokomotiv Yaroslavl	KHL	54	9	9	18	26	6	0	2	2	8
2015–16	Lokomotiv Yaroslavl	KHL	49	9	14	23	52	5	0	1	1	2
2016–17	Lokomotiv Yaroslavl	KHL	42	5	4	9	24	4	0	1	1	6
2017–18	Neftekhimik Nizhnekamsk	KHL	46	15	14	29	38	—	—	—	—	—
2018–19	Neftekhimik Nizhnekamsk	KHL	50	8	7	15	30	—	—	—	—	—
2019–20	Ak Bars Kazan	KHL	47	14	7	21	57	4	3	1	4	4
2020–21	SKA Saint Petersburg	KHL	29	8	8	16	14	16	4	6	10	4
2021–22	SKA Saint Petersburg	KHL	36	4	6	10	14	13	1	4	5	4
2022–23	SKA Saint Petersburg	KHL	27	8	6	14	14	12	3	0	3	6
2023–24	SKA Saint Petersburg	KHL	20	1	4	5	6	8	1	1	2	10
2024–25	SKA-Neva	VHL	10	3	4	7	6	—	—	—	—	—
2024–25	Avangard Omsk	KHL	15	4	4	8	4	1	0	0	0	0
2025–26	Barys Astana	KHL	33	3	8	11	34	—	—	—	—	—
KHL totals			550	102	110	212	353	93	13	21	34	58

Medal record

Ice hockey

Representing Russia

World Junior A Challenge
Bronze medal – third place	2009 Summerside	

=== International ===
Year	Team	Event	Result	GP	G	A	Pts	PIM
2009	Russia	IH18	2nd place, silver medalist(s)	4	1	2	3	4
2010	Russia	U18	4th	7	2	1	3	6
2021	ROC	WC	5th	8	1	1	2	4
Junior totals				11	3	3	6	10
Senior totals				8	1	1	2	4
