= Ryan O'Connor (ice hockey) =

Canadian ice hockey player (born 1992)

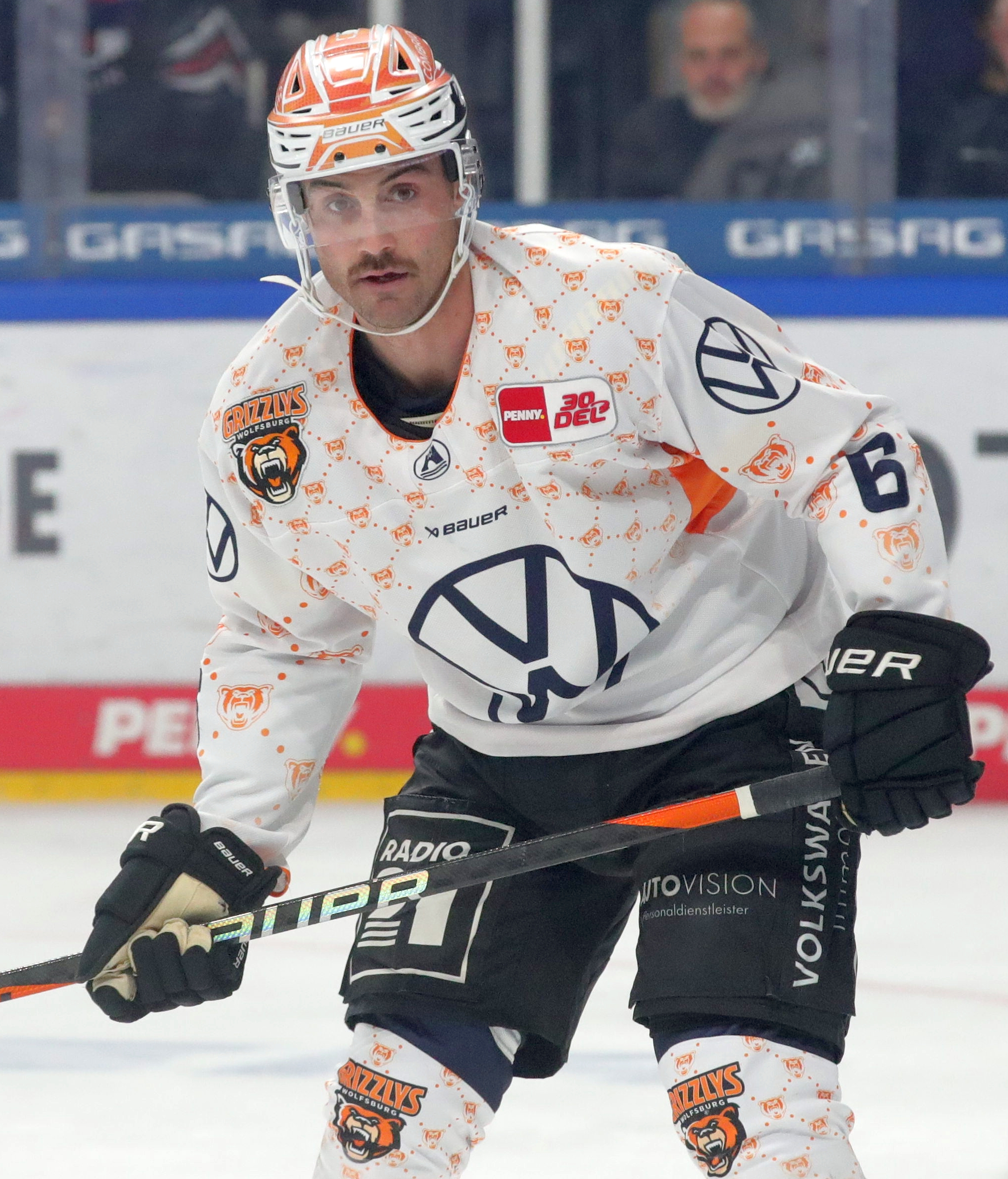
- Ryan O'Connor, 2023
- Born: January 12, 1992 (age 34) Hamilton, Ontario, Canada
- Height: 5 ft 11 in (180 cm)
- Weight: 192 lb (87 kg; 13 st 10 lb)
- Position: Defence
- Shoots: Right
- Slovak Extraliga team Former teams: HC Slovan Bratislava; HC Davos; KHL Medveščak Zagreb; Espoo Blues; KooKoo; HIFK; Iserlohn Roosters; Grizzlys Wolfsburg
- NHL draft: Undrafted
- Playing career: 2013–present

Ryan O'Connor (born January 12, 1992) is a Canadian professional ice hockey defenceman. He is currently playing with HC Slovan Bratislava of the Slovak Extraliga.

== Playing career ==
O'Connor played major junior hockey in the Ontario Hockey League with the Barrie Colts and Saginaw Spirit. Undrafted, O'Connor made his Kontinental Hockey League (KHL) debut playing with KHL Medveščak during the 2013–14 season, on loan from HC Davos of the Swiss National League A

On July 21, 2014, O'Connor continued his career abroad in agreeing to a one-year contract with Finnish Liiga club, the Espoo Blues.

Following the 2018–19 season, his third with HIFK, O'Connor left the Liiga as a free agent, securing a one-year contract with German club, the Iserlohn Roosters of the DEL, on April 23, 2019.

O'Connor remained with the Roosters for four seasons before leaving the club as a free agent to continue in the DEL with the Grizzlys Wolfsburg on a two-year contract on May 10, 2023.
