= Bohumil Jank =

Czech ice hockey player

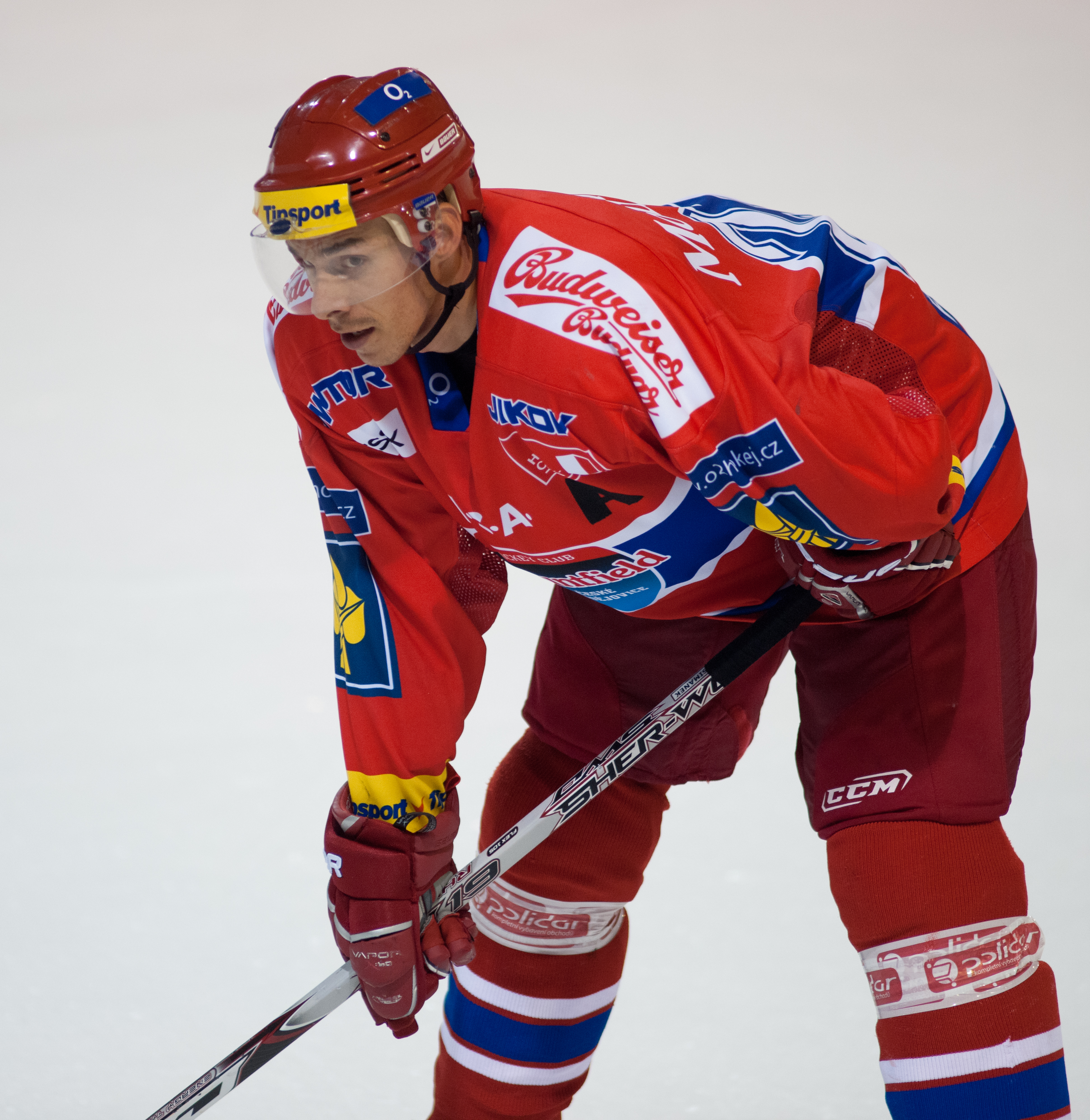
- Born: 6 July 1992 (age 34) Milevsko, Czechoslovakia
- Height: 6 ft 2 in (188 cm)
- Weight: 192 lb (87 kg; 13 st 10 lb)
- Position: Defence
- Shoots: Left
- Czech Extraliga team Former teams: Mountfield HK; HC České Budějovice; HC Lev Poprad; HC Oceláři Třinec; Piráti Chomutov; HC Plzeň
- National team: Czech Republic
- NHL draft: Undrafted
- Playing career: 2009–present

Bohumil Jank (born 6 July 1992) is a Czech professional ice hockey defenceman playing for Mountfield HK of the Czech Extraliga.

Jank has previously played for HC České Budějovice, HC Oceláři Třinec, Piráti Chomutov and HC Plzeň. He has also played in the Kontinental Hockey League for HC Lev Poprad.

== Career statistics ==
			Regular season					Playoffs
Season	Team	League	GP	G	A	Pts	PIM	GP	G	A	Pts	PIM
2009–10	HC České Budějovice	Czech Extraliga	9	0	0	0	2	-	-	-	-	-
2010–11	HC České Budějovice	Czech Extraliga	11	0	1	1	4	-	-	-	-	-
2010–11	Victoriaville Tigres	QMJHL	20	0	12	12	21	9	0	2	2	16
			.	.	.	.	.	.	.	.	.	.
