= Michal Vachovec =

Czech ice hockey player

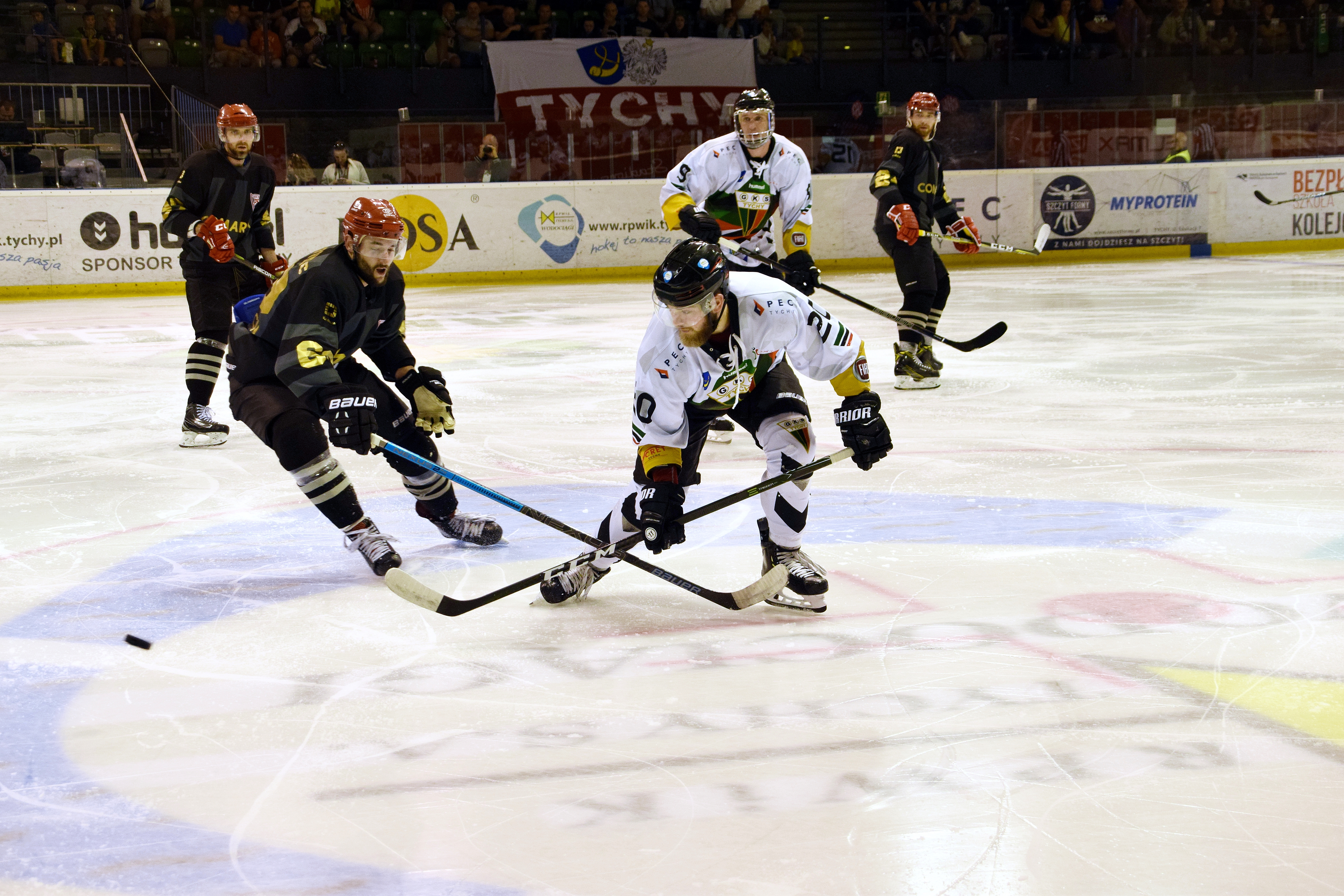
- 20
- Born: July 15, 1992 (age 33) Karlovy Vary, Czechoslovakia
- Height: 6 ft 2 in (188 cm)
- Weight: 185 lb (84 kg; 13 st 3 lb)
- Position: Forward
- Shoots: Left
- Czech Extraliga team: HC Karlovy Vary
- Playing career: 2010–present

Michal Vachovec (born July 15, 1992) is a Czech professional ice hockey player who currently plays with KS Cracovia of the Polska Hokej League
