= Daniel Mannberg =

Swedish ice hockey player

- Born: December 27, 1992 (age 32); Boden, Sweden
- Height: 5 ft 9 in (175 cm)
- Weight: 172 lb (78 kg; 12 st 4 lb)
- Position: Forward
- Shoots: Right
- Allsv team Former teams: Modo Hockey; Luleå HF; Brynäs IF
- Playing career: 2010–present

Daniel Mannberg (born December 27, 1992) is a Swedish professional ice hockey player currently under contract with Modo Hockey of the HockeyAllsvenskan (Allsv).

He originally played with Luleå HF in the Elitserien during the 2010–11 Elitserien season. He has also featured with Brynäs IF in the SHL.
