= Mattias Granlund =

Swedish ice hockey player

- Born: June 14, 1992 (age 33) Glommersträsk, Sweden
- Height: 5 ft 11 in (180 cm)
- Weight: 185 lb (84 kg; 13 st 3 lb)
- Position: Left wing
- Shot: Left
- Played for: Skellefteå AIK; Karlskrona HK
- Playing career: 2010–2021

Mattias Granlund (born June 14, 1992) is a Swedish former professional ice hockey player who played in the Swedish Hockey League (SHL).

== Playing career ==
Granlund played with Skellefteå AIK in the Elitserien during the 2010–11 Elitserien season. Granlund later moved down a division to play with Swedish team IK Oskarshamn in Hockeyallsvenskan.
