= Miihkali Teppo =

Finnish ice hockey player

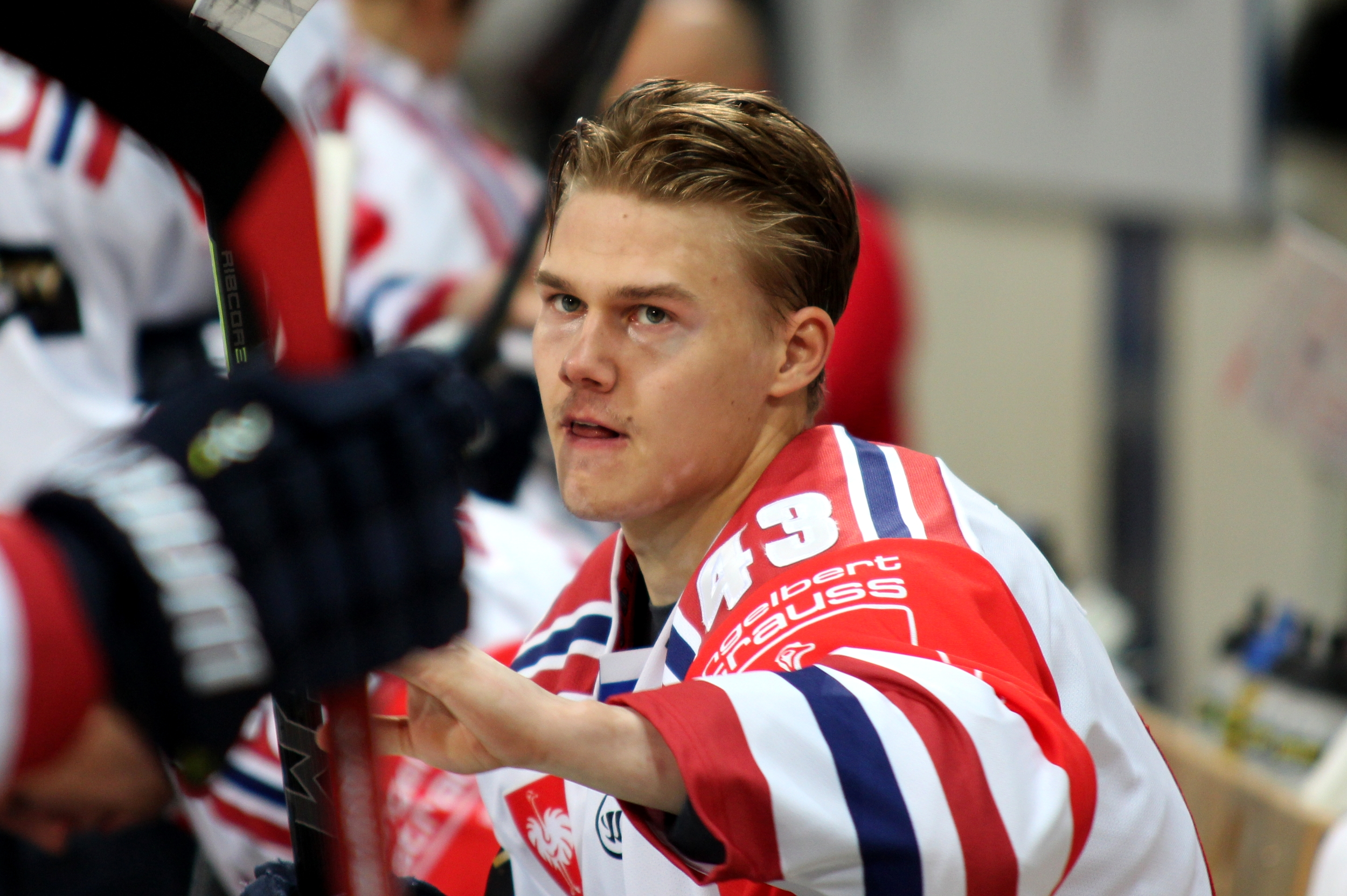
- Born: December 28, 1992 (age 33) Helsinki, Finland
- Height: 6 ft 1 in (185 cm)
- Weight: 179 lb (81 kg; 12 st 11 lb)
- Position: Defence
- Shoots: Left
- EIHL team Former teams: Glasgow Clan; HIFK; KooKoo; Pelicans; Oulun Kärpät; Sparta Sarpsborg
- NHL draft: Undrafted
- Playing career: 2011–present

Miihkali Teppo (born December 28, 1992) is a Finnish ice hockey defenceman. He is currently playing with UK Elite Ice Hockey League (EIHL) side Glasgow Clan. Teppo previously iced in the Finnish Liiga with HIFK, KooKoo, Pelicans and Oulun Kärpät.

Teppo made his Liiga debut playing with HIFK during the 2013–14 Liiga season.

After a spell in Norway with Sparta Sarpsborg, Teppo joined Glasgow Clan ahead of the 2025–26 season.
