= Konsta Mäkinen =

Finnish ice hockey player

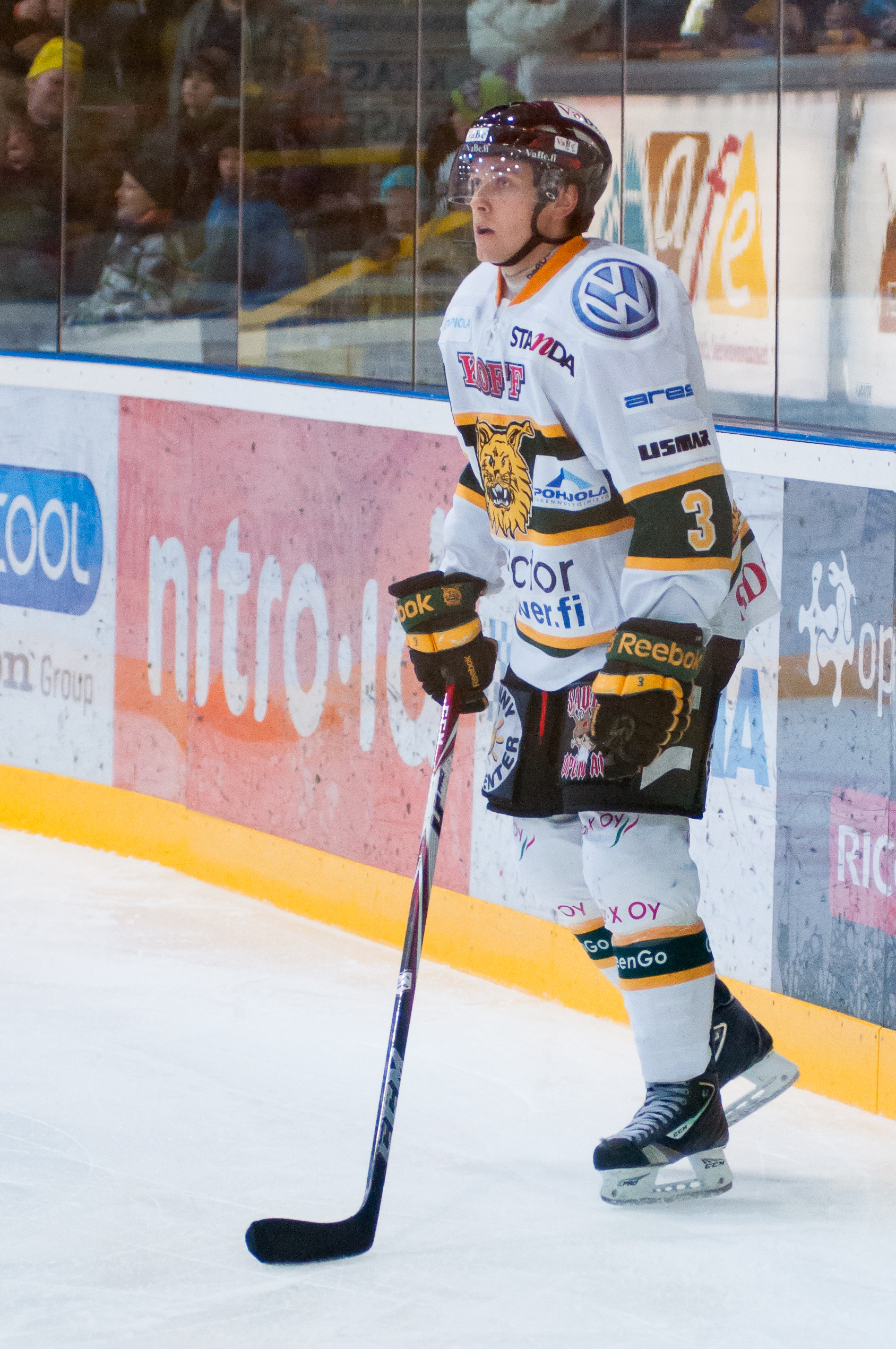
- Born: January 19, 1992 (age 33); Tampere, Finland
- Height: 5 ft 9 in (175 cm)
- Weight: 165 lb (75 kg; 11 st 11 lb)
- Position: Defence
- Shoots: Left
- EliteHockey Ligaen team: Storhamar Hockey
- NHL draft: Undrafted
- Playing career: 2010–present

Konsta Mäkinen (born January 19, 1992) is a Finnish professional Ice Hockey Defenceman. He currently plays for Storhamar Hockey of the Norwegian EliteHockey Ligaen.

== Career ==
He made his Liiga debut playing with Ilves during the 2010–11 SM-liiga season.
