= Roope Hämäläinen =

Finnish ice hockey player

- Born: 18 August 1992 (age 32); Lappeenranta, Finland
- Height: 5 ft 10 in (178 cm)
- Weight: 179 lb (81 kg; 12 st 11 lb)
- Position: Centre
- Shot: Left
- Played for: SaiPa; Mikkelin Jukurit; Jokipojat
- NHL draft: Undrafted
- Playing career: 2009–2019

Roope Hämäläinen (born August 18, 1992) is a Finnish retired professional ice hockey player. During a career which spanned from 2009 to 2019, he played in the Liiga with SaiPa and in the Mestis with Mikkelin Jukurit and Jokipojat.

Hämäläinen made his Liiga debut playing with SaiPa during the 2009–10 SM-liiga season.
