= Victor Berglind =

Swedish ice hockey player

- Born: October 2, 1992 (age 32); Karlstad, Sweden
- Height: 5 ft 11 in (180 cm)
- Weight: 181 lb (82 kg; 12 st 13 lb)
- Position: Defence
- Shot: Right
- Played for: Arvika HC; Brynäs IF; IF Sundsvall Hockey; Djurgårdens IF; Rögle BK; IK Oskarshamn; BIK Karlskoga; Forshaga IF
- Playing career: 2009–2023

Victor Berglind (born October 2, 1992) is a Swedish professional ice hockey defenceman who currently plays for BIK Karlskoga of the HockeyAllsvenskan.

Berglind previously played in the Elitserien for Brynäs IF.

== Career statistics ==
| | | | Regular season | | | | | Playoffs |
| Season | Team | League | GP | G | A | Pts | PIM | GP | G | A | Pts | PIM |
|---|---|---|---|---|---|---|---|---|---|---|---|---|
| 2006–07 | Arvika HC | Division 2 | 1 | 0 | 0 | 0 | 0 | — | — | — | — | — |
| 2007–08 | Arvika HC | Division 2 | 20 | 5 | 4 | 9 | 16 | — | — | — | — | — |
| 2008–09 | Brynäs IF J18 | J18 Elit | 17 | 5 | 14 | 19 | 20 | — | — | — | — | — |
| 2008–09 | Brynäs IF J18 | J18 Allsvenskan | 7 | 3 | 4 | 7 | 29 | 3 | 1 | 1 | 2 | 0 |
| 2008–09 | Brynäs IF J20 | J20 SuperElit | 12 | 1 | 1 | 2 | 8 | 1 | 0 | 0 | 0 | 0 |
| 2009–10 | Brynäs IF J18 | J18 Elit | 2 | 1 | 2 | 3 | 8 | — | — | — | — | — |
| 2009–10 | Brynäs IF J18 | J18 Allsvenskan | 3 | 1 | 1 | 2 | 2 | 3 | 4 | 4 | 8 | 2 |
| 2009–10 | Brynäs IF J20 | J20 SuperElit | 30 | 6 | 15 | 21 | 85 | 3 | 0 | 1 | 1 | 2 |
| 2009–10 | Brynäs IF | Elitserien | 11 | 0 | 1 | 1 | 2 | — | — | — | — | — |
| 2010–11 | Brynäs IF J20 | J20 SuperElit | 36 | 10 | 23 | 33 | 54 | 2 | 0 | 0 | 0 | 8 |
| 2010–11 | Brynäs IF | Elitserien | 18 | 1 | 0 | 1 | 2 | 1 | 0 | 0 | 0 | 0 |
| 2011–12 | Brynäs IF J20 | J20 SuperElit | 5 | 0 | 1 | 1 | 6 | — | — | — | — | — |
| 2011–12 | Brynäs IF | Elitserien | 5 | 0 | 0 | 0 | 0 | — | — | — | — | — |
| 2011–12 | IF Sundsvall Hockey | HockeyAllsvenskan | 31 | 1 | 8 | 9 | 6 | — | — | — | — | — |
| 2012–13 | Brynäs IF J20 | J20 SuperElit | 1 | 0 | 0 | 0 | 0 | — | — | — | — | — |
| 2012–13 | Brynäs IF | Elitserien | 37 | 3 | 2 | 5 | 8 | 4 | 0 | 0 | 0 | 0 |
| 2012–13 | Djurgårdens IF | HockeyAllsvenskan | 3 | 0 | 0 | 0 | 4 | — | — | — | — | — |
| 2013–14 | Rögle BK | HockeyAllsvenskan | 49 | 7 | 13 | 20 | 38 | 12 | 0 | 3 | 3 | 0 |
| 2014–15 | Rögle BK | HockeyAllsvenskan | 22 | 2 | 3 | 5 | 4 | — | — | — | — | — |
| 2014–15 | IK Oskarshamn | HockeyAllsvenskan | 19 | 1 | 4 | 5 | 14 | — | — | — | — | — |
| 2015–16 | BIK Karlskoga | HockeyAllsvenskan | 46 | 4 | 16 | 20 | 16 | 4 | 0 | 0 | 0 | 2 |
| 2016–17 | BIK Karlskoga | HockeyAllsvenskan | 48 | 3 | 15 | 18 | 35 | 7 | 1 | 1 | 2 | 4 |
| 2017–18 | BIK Karlskoga | HockeyAllsvenskan | 28 | 1 | 6 | 7 | 4 | — | — | — | — | — |
| 2018–19 | BIK Karlskoga | HockeyAllsvenskan | 48 | 3 | 13 | 16 | 20 | 1 | 0 | 0 | 0 | 0 |
| 2019–20 | BIK Karlskoga | HockeyAllsvenskan | 31 | 1 | 8 | 9 | 14 | 1 | 0 | 0 | 0 | 0 |
| 2020–21 | BIK Karlskoga | HockeyAllsvenskan | 33 | 0 | 6 | 6 | 18 | 11 | 1 | 3 | 4 | 4 |
| 2021–22 | Forshaga IF | Hockeyettan | 35 | 2 | 18 | 20 | 34 | — | — | — | — | — |
| 2022–23 | Arvika HC | Division 2 | 13 | 5 | 6 | 11 | 8 | — | — | — | — | — |
| Elitserien totals | | | 71 | 4 | 3 | 7 | 12 | 5 | 0 | 0 | 0 | 0 |
| HockeyAllsvenskan totals | | | 358 | 23 | 92 | 115 | 173 | 35 | 2 | 7 | 9 | 10 |
