= Dušan Žovinec =

Czech ice hockey player

- Born: October 5, 1992 (age 32); Prague, Czechoslovakia
- Height: 5 ft 11 in (180 cm)
- Weight: 168 lb (76 kg; 12 st 0 lb)
- Position: Defence
- Shoots: Left
- Maxa Liga team: HC Stadion Litoměřice
- Playing career: 2011–present

Dušan Žovinec (born October 5, 1992) is a Czech professional ice hockey player. He played with HC Sparta Praha in the Czech Extraliga during the 2010–11 Czech Extraliga postseason.
