= Vladislav Kartayev =

Russian ice hockey player

- Born: February 10, 1992 (age 33) Chelyabinsk, Russia
- Height: 6 ft 2 in (188 cm)
- Weight: 165 lb (75 kg; 11 st 11 lb)
- Position: Forward
- Shoots: Left
- KHL team Former teams: Free agent Salavat Yulaev Ufa; Lokomotiv Yaroslavl; Metallurg Novokuznetsk
- Playing career: 2011–present

Vladislav Dimitrievich Kartaev (Картаев, Владислав Дмитриевич; born February 10, 1992) is a Russian ice hockey player. He is currently an unrestricted free agent who most recently played with Salavat Yulaev Ufa of the Kontinental Hockey League (KHL).

Kartaev made his Kontinental Hockey League (KHL) debut playing with Salavat Yulaev during the 2010–11 KHL season.
