= Stefan Stepanov =

Russian ice hockey player

- Born: September 23, 1992 (age 33) Ekaterinburg, Russia
- Height: 6 ft 1 in (185 cm)
- Weight: 176 lb (80 kg; 12 st 8 lb)
- Position: Defence
- Shoots: Left
- KHL team Former teams: Free Agent; CSKA Moscow; Avtomobilist Yekaterinburg; Albany Devils; Atlant Moscow Oblast
- NHL draft: Undrafted
- Playing career: 2010–present

Stefan Stepanov (born September 23, 1992) is a Russian professional ice hockey defenceman. He became an unrestricted free agent after playing with Atlant Moscow Oblast of the Kontinental Hockey League (KHL). Stepanov was a first round selection in the 2009 KHL Junior Draft.

Stepanov made his Kontinental Hockey League (KHL) debut playing with HC CSKA Moscow during the 2010–11 KHL season.
