= David Dvořáček =

Czech ice hockey player

- Born: June 4, 1992 (age 32); Brno, Czechoslovakia
- Height: 5 ft 11 in (180 cm)
- Weight: 176 lb (80 kg; 12 st 8 lb)
- Position: Forward
- Shoots: Left
- Czech team Former teams: HC Sparta Praha; Tappara
- Playing career: 2010–present

David Dvořáček (born June 4, 1992) is a Czech professional ice hockey player. He is currently playing for HC Sparta Praha of the Czech Extraliga.

Dvořáček made his Czech Extraliga debut playing with HC Sparta Praha during the 2014-15 Czech Extraliga season. He also played two games in the SM-liiga for Tappara during the 2010–11 season.
