= Sebastian Ottosson =

Swedish ice hockey player

- Born: February 7, 1992 (age 33) Karlskrona, Sweden
- Height: 5 ft 10 in (178 cm)
- Weight: 187 lb (85 kg; 13 st 5 lb)
- Position: Forward
- Shoots: Right
- Division 1 team Former teams: Kallinge/Ronneby; Elitserien; Linköpings HC
- NHL draft: Undrafted
- Playing career: 2010–present

Sebastian Ottosson (born February 7, 1992) is a Swedish professional ice hockey player. He is currently playing in Sweden's Division 1 with Kallinge/Ronneby.

Ottosson made his Elitserien debut playing with Linköpings HC during the 2009–10 Elitserien season.

In 2017 he played for Melbourne Ice in the Australian Ice Hockey League (AIHL), winning the Goodall Cup.
