= List of sporting events in Taiwan =

This is a list of international sporting events in Taiwan.

== Multi-sport events ==
Year	Location	Event
2000	Taipei	2000 Asia Pacific Deaf Games
2002	Taipei	2002 International Children's Games
2007	Taipei	2007 World Wheelchair and Amputee Games
2009	Kaohsiung	2009 World Games
2009	Taipei	2009 Summer Deaflympics
2015	Taoyuan	2015 Asia Pacific Deaf Games
2016	New Taipei	2016 International Children's Games
2017	Taipei	2017 Summer Universiade
2025	Taipei and New Taipei	2025 Summer World Masters Games
2026	Hualien	2026 International Children's Games

== Archery ==
Year	Location	Event
1998	Taipei	1998 World University Archery Championships
2008	Tainan	2008 World University Archery Championships
2013	Taipei	2013 Asian Archery Championships

== Association football, futsal, minifootball ==
Year	Location	Sport	Event
1977	Taipei	Association football	1977 AFC Women's Championship
1986	Kaohsiung	Association football	1986 OFC U-16/U-17 Championship
2001	New Taipei	Association football	2001 AFC Women's Championship
2004	Taipei and Taoyuan City	Futsal	2004 FIFA Futsal World Championship
2005	Taipei	Association football	2005 East Asian Football Championship (Preliminary Competition)
2006	Taipei	Association football	2006 Taipei International Invitational Futsal Tournament
2007	Taipei	Association football	Damien Knabben Cup
2008	Taipei	Association football	2008 AFC President's Cup (Group B)
2010	Kaohsiung	Association football	2010 East Asian Football Championship (Preliminary Competition)
2010	Tainan	Association football	2010 EAFF Women's Football Championship (Semi-Final Competition)
2011	Kaohsiung	Association football	2011 AFC President's Cup
2017	Taipei	Association football	CTFA International Tournament
2018	Taipei and New Taipei	Futsal	2018 AFC Futsal Championship
2025	Taipei	Minifootball (Six-a-side)	2025 Asian Mini Football Championship

== Athletics ==
Year	Location	Event
1988	Tainan	1988 Asia Masters Athletics Championships
2012	Taipei	2012 Asia Masters Athletics Championships
2014	Taipei	2014 Asian Junior Athletics Championships

== Badminton ==
Year	Location	Event
2001	Taipei	2001 Asian Junior Badminton Championships
2005	Hsinchu	2005 IBAD Para-Badminton World Championships
2007	Taipei	2007 BWF World Senior Championships
2010	New Taipei	2010 BWF Super Series Finals
2010	Taipei	2010 World University Badminton Championships
2011	Taoyuan	2011 BWF World Junior Championships
2013	Taipei	2013 Badminton Asia Championships
2014	Taipei	2014 Asian Junior Badminton Championships

== Baseball ==
Year	Location	Event
1962	Taipei	1962 Asian Baseball Championship
1969	Taipei	1969 Asian Baseball Championship
1997	Hsinchu	1997 World Youth Baseball Championship
1997	Taipei	1997 Asian Baseball Championship
1999	Kaohsiung	1999 World Junior Baseball Championship
2001	Taipei	2001 U-18 Asian Baseball Championship
2001	New Taipei (Xinzhuang)	2001 Asian Baseball Championship
2001	Taipei, New Taipei, Chiayi, and Kaohsiung	2001 Baseball World Cup
2003	Kaohsiung	2003 World Youth Baseball Championship
2004	Tainan	2004 World University Baseball Championship
2004	Taipei	2004 World Junior Baseball Championship
2006	Taichung	2006 Intercontinental Cup
2006	Taipei	2006 Women's Baseball World Cup
2007	Taichung	2007 U-18 Asian Baseball Championship
2007	Taipei, New Taipei, Taichung, and Yunlin (Douliu)	2007 Baseball World Cup
2007	Taichung	2007 Asian Baseball Championship
2008	Taichung	2008 Summer Olympics Baseball Final Qualifying Tournament
2009	Taichung	2009 World Youth Baseball Championship
2010	Taichung and Yunlin (Douliu)	2010 Intercontinental Cup
2010	Taichung	2010 CPBL–KBO Club Championship
2011	Taichung	2011 Asia Series
2012	Taichung	2012 Asian Baseball Championship
2012	New Taipei	2013 World Baseball Classic – Qualifier 4
2013	Taichung	2013 World Baseball Classic (Pool B)
2013	Taichung and Yunlin (Douliu)	2013 18U Baseball World Cup
2013	Taichung, Taoyuan	2013 Asia Series
2014	Taichung	2014 U-21 Baseball World Cup
2015	Taichung	2015 Asian Baseball Championship
2015	Taichung, Taipei, Taoyuan, and Yunlin (Douliu)	2015 WBSC Premier12 (Group A, Group B and Quarterfinals)
2016	Taichung	2016 U-18 Asian Baseball Championship
2017	Taipei and New Taipei	2017 Asian Baseball Championship
2018	Chiayi	2018 World University Baseball Championship
2019	Taichung and Yunlin (Douliu)	2019 Asian Baseball Championship
2019	Taichung and Taoyuan	2019 WBSC Premier12 (Opening Round - Group B)
2022	Taipei, Taichung, and Yunlin (Douliu)	2022 U-23 Baseball World Cup
2023^{1}	Taichung	2023 World Baseball Classic (Pool A)
2023	Taipei, Taichung	2023 U-18 Baseball World Cup
2023	Taipei, New Taipei, Taichung	2023 Asian Baseball Championship
2024	Taipei, New Taipei, Taoyuan	2024 U-18 Asian Baseball Championship
2024	Taipei	2024 WBSC Premier12 (Opening Round - Group B)
2026	Taipei	2026 World Baseball Classic qualification (Pool A)
2026	Tainan	2027 Women's Baseball World Cup (Group Stage)
2026	Taipei, New Taipei	2026 U-18 Asian Baseball Championship

^{1} The 2021 World Baseball Classic was originally scheduled for 2021, but has been rescheduled to 2023 due to the COVID-19 pandemic.

== Baseball5 ==
Year	Location	Event
2025	Taipei	2025 Youth Baseball5 Asia Cup

== Basketball ==
Year	Location	Event
1963	Taipei	1963 ABC Championship
1968	Taipei	1968 ABC Championship for Women
1972	Taipei	1972 ABC Championship for Women
2002	Taipei	2002 ABC Under-18 Championship for Women
2004	Taipei	2004 FIBA Asia Stanković Cup

== Boxing ==
Year	Location	Event
2005	Kaohsiung	2005 Asian Women's Amateur Boxing Championships
2015	Taipei	2015 AIBA Women's Junior/Youth World Boxing Championships

== Canoeing ==
Year	Location	Event
2003	Tainan	2003 Asian Canoe Polo Championships
2003	Nantou (Shuili)	2003 Asian Canoe Slalom Championships
2009	Hualien	2009 Asian Canoe Polo Championships
2013	Nantou (Shuili)	2013 Asian Canoe Slalom Championships

== Climbing ==
Year	Location	Event
1998	Taoyuan	1998 IFSC Climbing Asian Championships (L + S)
2001	New Taipei	2001 IFSC Climbing Asian Championships (B)
2006	Kaohsiung	2006 IFSC Climbing Asian Championships (L + B + S)

== Cycle Polo ==
Year	Location	Event
2015	Kaohsiung	2015 Asia Hardcourt Bike Polo Championship
2016	Kaohsiung	2016 Asia Hardcourt Bike Polo Championship
2025	New Taipei City	2025 World Hardcourt Bike Polo Championship

== Figure skating ==
Year	Location	Event
2006	Taipei	2006–07 ISU Junior Grand Prix
2007	Taipei	2007 Asian Open Figure Skating Trophy
2011	Taipei	2011 Four Continents Figure Skating Championships
2012	Taipei	2012 Asian Open Figure Skating Trophy
2014	Taipei	2014 Asian Open Figure Skating Trophy
2014	Taipei	2014 Four Continents Figure Skating Championships
2016	Taipei	2016 Four Continents Figure Skating Championships
2017	Taipei	2017 World Junior Figure Skating Championships
2018	Taipei	2018 Four Continents Figure Skating Championships
2024	Taipei	2024 World Junior Figure Skating Championships

== Golf ==
Year	Location	Event
1967	New Taipei	1967 Nomura Cup
1989	New Taipei	1989 Nomura Cup
2000	New Taipei	2000 Queen Sirikit Cup
2001	Taiwan	BMW Asian Open
2002	Taiwan	BMW Asian Open
2002	Taoyuan	2002 World University Golf Championship
2007	Taoyuan	2007 Nomura Cup
2013	Taoyuan	2013 Queen Sirikit Cup

== Ice hockey ==
Year	Location	Event
2009	Taipei	2009 IIHF World U18 Championship Division III (Group A)
2010	Taipei	2010 IIHF Challenge Cup of Asia
2011	Taipei	2011 IIHF World U18 Championship Division III (Group A)
2013	Taipei	2013 IIHF World U18 Championship Division III (Group A)
2015	Taipei	2015 IIHF World U18 Championship Division III (Group A)
2015	Taipei	2015 IIHF Challenge Cup of Asia
2015	Taipei	2015 IIHF Women's Challenge Cup of Asia Division I
2016	Taipei	2016 IIHF Women's Challenge Cup of Asia Division I
2017	Taipei	2017 IIHF World U18 Championship Division III (Group A)
2017	Taipei	2017 IIHF Women's World Championship Division II (Division II B Qualification)

== Martial arts ==
Year	Location	Sport	Event
1970	Kaohsiung	Judo	1970 Asian Judo Championships
1980	Taipei	Taekwondo	1980 Asian Taekwondo Championships
1982	Taipei	Karate	1982 World Karate Championships
1990	Taipei	Taekwondo	1990 Asian Taekwondo Championships
1993	Taipei	Karate	1993 Asian Karate Championships
1996	Taichung	Karate	1996 Asian Cadet, Junior and U-21yrs Karate Championships
2004	Taoyuan	Karate	2004 Asian Karate Championships
2006	Taipei	Kendo	2006 World Kendo Championship
2008	Taipei	Judo	2008 East Asian Judo Championships
2009	Taipei	Judo	2009 Asian Judo Championships
2014	Taipei	Taekwondo	2014 World Taekwondo Junior Championships
2016	Taoyuan	Wushu	2016 Asian Wushu Championships
2018	Taoyuan	Taekwondo	2018 World Taekwondo Grand Prix (Series 3)

== Pool ==
Year	Location	Sport	Event
1992	Taipei	Nine-ball	1992 WPA World Pool Championship / 1992 WPA Women's World Pool Championship
1995	Taipei	Nine-ball	1995 WPA World Pool Championship / 1995 WPA Women's World Pool Championship
1998	Taipei	Nine-ball	1998 WPA World Nine-ball Championship / 1998 WPA Women's World Nine-ball Championship
2002	Kaohsiung	Nine-ball	2002 WPA Women's World Nine-ball Championship
2004	Taipei	Nine-ball	2004 WPA World Nine-ball Championship
2005	Kaohsiung	Nine-ball	2005 WPA World Nine-ball Championship
2006	Taipei	Nine-ball	2006 WPA Women's World Nine-ball Championship
2007	Taoyuan	Nine-ball	2007 WPA Women's World Nine-ball Championship
2008	Taipei	Nine-ball	2008 WPA Women's World Nine-ball Championship

== Rowing ==
Year	Location	Event
1997	Taiwan	1997 Asian Rowing Championships
2009	Yilan	2009 Asian Rowing Championships

== Rugby ==
Year	Location	Event
1980	Taipei	1980 ARFU Asian Rugby Championship
1996	Taipei	1996 ARFU Asian Rugby Championship
2013	Kaohsiung	2013 U-19 Asia Rugby Championship
2018	Taipei	2018 U-19 Asia Rugby Championship
2019	Kaohsiung	2019 U-19 Asia Rugby Championship

== Softball ==
Year	Location	Event
1969	Taipei	1969 Asian Women's Softball Championship
1982	Taipei	1982 Women's Softball World Championship
1999	Taipei	1999 Junior Women's Softball World Championship
2006	Tainan	2006 World University Softball Championship
2011	Nantou	2011 Asian Women's Softball Championship
2017	Taichung	2017 Asian Women's Softball Championship
2019	Tainan	2019 U-12 Softball World Cup
2021	Taichung	2021 U-12 Softball World Cup
2023	Nantou	2023 U-15 Women Softball Asian Cup
2025	Nantou	2025 U-15 Women Softball Asian Cup

== Soft tennis ==
Year	Location	Event
1977	Taichung	1977 World Soft Tennis Championships
1983	Taichung	1983 World Soft Tennis Championships
1999	Taipei	1999 World Soft Tennis Championships
2012	Chiayi	2012 Asian Soft Tennis Championship

== Squash ==
Year	Location	Event
2006	Taipei	2006 Asian Squash Championships (Individual and Team)
2016	New Taipei	2016 Asian Squash Team Championships

== Table tennis ==
Year	Location	Event
1994	Taipei	1994 ITTF Men's World Cup
1998	Taipei	1998 ITTF Women's World Cup
2002	Taipei	2002 World Para Table Tennis Championships
2019	Taichung	2019 Asian Para Table Tennis Championships

== Tchoukball ==
Year	Location	Event
1984	Taiwan	1984 World Tchoukball Championships
2004	Taiwan	2004 World Youth Tchoukball Championships
2004	Taiwan	2004 World Tchoukball Championships
2006	Taiwan	2006 Asia Pacific Tchoukball Championships
2008	Taiwan	2008 Asia Pacific Tchoukball Championships
2011	Taiwan	2011 Asia Pacific University Tchoukball Championships
2013	Taiwan	2013 World Youth Tchoukball Championships
2014	Taiwan	2014 Asia Pacific Tchoukball Championships
2015	Taiwan	2015 World Tchoukball Championships
2016	Taiwan	2016 Asia Pacific Youth Tchoukball Championships
2017	Taiwan	2017 World Beach Tchoukball Championships
2019	Taiwan	2019 Asia Pacific University Tchoukball Championships

== Tennis ==
Year	Location	Event
2024	Taipei	2024 Davis Cup qualifying round

== Volleyball ==
Year	Location	Event
1999	Chiayi	1999 Asian Youth Boys Volleyball Championship
2008	Taipei	2008 Asian Junior Women's Volleyball Championship
2009	Miaoli	2009 FIVB Volleyball World Grand Prix (Group D)
2011	Taipei	2011 Asian Women's Volleyball Championship
2014	Taipei	2014 Asian Women's U19 Volleyball Championship
2015	Taipei	2015 Asian Men's Club Volleyball Championship
2016	Kaohsiung	2016 Asian Men's U20 Volleyball Championship
2018	Taipei	2018 Asian Men's Volleyball Cup
2019	Taipei	2019 Asian Men's Club Volleyball Championship
2023	Taipei	2023 Asian Men's Volleyball Challenge Cup

== Other sporting events ==
Year	Location	Sport	Event
1997	Taipei	Wrestling	1997 Asian Wrestling Championships (Women)
2001	Kaohsiung and Taichung	Cycling	2001 Asian Cycling Championships
2007	Taipei	Handball	2007 Asian Women's Youth Handball Championship
2008	Taipei	K-1	K-1 World Grand Prix 2008 in Taipei
2008	Changhua	Gateball	2008 Asia Gateball Championship
2010	Taipei	Speed skating	2010 World Junior Short Track Speed Skating Championships
2013	Kaohsiung	Pentathlon	2013 World Modern Pentathlon Championships
2019	Taoyuan	Shooting sports	2019 Asian Airgun Championships
2023	Taipei	Korfball	2023 IKF World Korfball Championship
2026	Taipei	Tug of war	2026 TWIF Indoor World Championships
2026	Hualien	Dragon boat	2026 Club Crew World Championships (CCWC)

== Mind Sports ==
Year	Location	Sport	Event
1984	Taipei	Go (game)	1984 World Youth Go Championship
1985	Taipei	Go	1985 World Youth Go Championship
1986	Taipei	Go	1986 World Youth Go Championship
1997	Nantou	Go	1997 World Youth Go Championship
2010	Penghu	Go	2010 World Youth Go Championship
2017	Taipei	Renju	2017 Renju World Championship

== Recurring sporting events ==
Year	Location	Sport	Event
1977–	New Taipei, Taipei, and Kaohsiung	Basketball	William Jones Cup
1979–	New Taipei	Marathon	New Taipei City Wan Jin Shi Marathon
1980–	Taipei	Badminton	Taipei Open
1986–	Taipei	Marathon	Taipei Marathon
1987–	New Taipei (Tamsui)	Golf	Mercuries Taiwan Masters
2000–	Hualien	Marathon	Taroko Gorge International Marathon
2003–	Taiwan	Cycling	Tour de Taiwan
2007–	Tainan	Marathon	Tainan Historical Capital International Half Marathon
2008–	Taipei	Tennis	Taipei Open
2010–	Kaohsiung	Marathon	Kaohsiung Fubon Marathon
2011–	Taipei (2011 - 2013), Tainan (2014 -)	Baseball	U-12 Baseball World Cup
2012–	Hualien, Nantou	Cycling	Taiwan KOM Challenge
2012–	Taichung, and Yunlin (Douliu)	Baseball	Asia Winter Baseball League
2012–	Kaohsiung	Tennis	Kaohsiung Challenger
2014–	Taipei	Tennis	Santaizi ATP Challenger
2020–	Taoyuan	Golf	Wistron Ladies Open
2023–	Kaohsiung	Badminton	Kaohsiung Masters

== Former recurring sporting events ==
Year	Location	Sport	Event
1965–2006	Taiwan	Golf	Taiwan Open
1977–1992	Taipei	Tennis	Taipei Grand Prix
1986–1994	Taipei	Tennis	Taipei Women's Championships
2010–2011	Kaohsiung	Association football	Long Teng Cup
2011–	Taoyuan, New Taipei, Taipei	Golf	LPGA Taiwan Championship
2011–	New Taipei, Taichung, Kaohsiung	Baseball	MLB Taiwan All-Star Series
2015–2016	Taipei	Badminton	Chinese Taipei Masters
2016–2018	Kaohsiung and Taipei	Tennis	WTA Taiwan Open

== Cancelled sporting events ==
Year	Location	Sport	Event
2012	Taoyuan	Baseball	2012 World University Baseball Championship
2019	Taipei	Figure skating	Asian Open Figure Skating Classic
2019	Taipei	Multi-sport	2019 World Combat Games
2019	Taichung	Multi-sport	2019 East Asian Youth Games

== See also ==
- Sport in Taiwan
- List of stadiums in Taiwan
