= Cocona Sakurai =

Japanese professional golfer (born 2004)

Kokona "Cocona" Sakurai 櫻井 心那
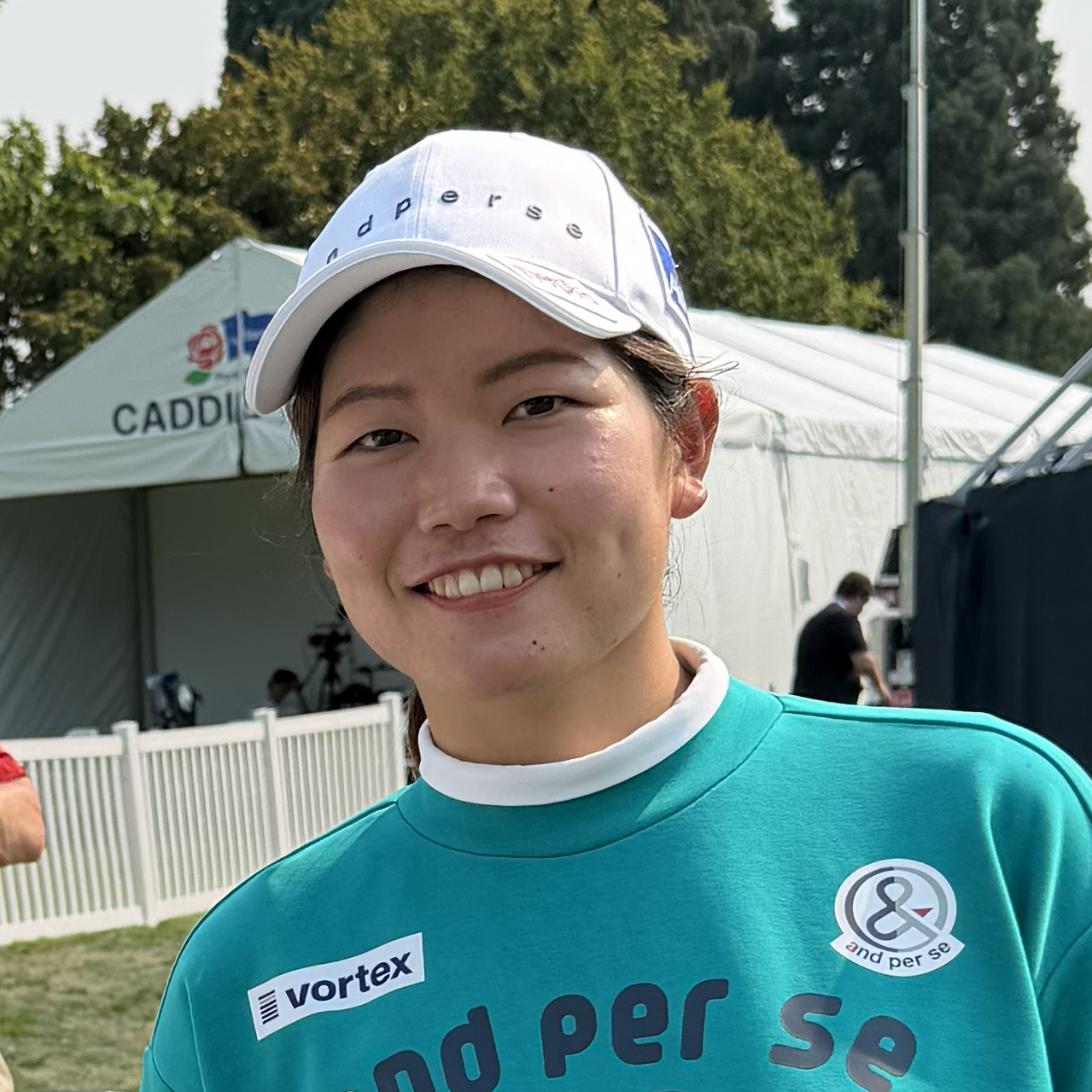
- Cocona in August 2026

Personal information
- Full name: Kokona Sakurai
- Nicknames: Cocona, Koko-chan
- Nationality: Japan
- Born: 13 February 2004 (age 22) Nagasaki City, Nagasaki Prefecture, Kyushu, Japan
- Height: 166 cm (5 ft 5 in)

Career
- Sport: Golf
- Turned professional: 2022
- Current tours: LPGA; LPGA of Japan Tour
- Professional wins: 11

Number of wins by tour
- LPGA of Japan Tour: 5
- Other: 6

Best results in LPGA major championships
- Chevron Championship: DNP
- Women's PGA C'ship: DNP
- U.S. Women's Open: CUT: 2024
- Women's British Open: T50: 2023
- Evian Championship: DNP

Achievements and awards
- 1st Place in LPGA of Japan StepUp Tour Prize Money Ranking: 2022
- GTPA Rookie of the Year: 2023
- JLPGA Fighting Spirit Award: 2023
- Green Hat Award of the Kyushu-Okinawa District: 2024

Kokona "Cocona" Sakurai (櫻井 心那, Sakurai Kokona) (born 13 February 2004) is a Japanese professional golfer and is of the Diamond Generation (2003 school year generation) of women's golf. She plays on the LPGA Tour, under the registered name of Cocona Sakurai, and the LPGA of Japan Tour (JLPGA), where she has five wins. She holds the record for most wins in a season (five in 2022) for the LPGA of Japan StepUp Tour,

== Early life and amateur career ==
Sakurai, the youngest of a family of five with two older brothers, was born in Nagasaki City, Nagasaki Prefecture, Kyushu, Japan.

Sakurai started playing golf at the age of six along with Go, a brother one year her senior, out of admiration of Ryo Ishikawa whom she saw playing in person.

While attending Yamazato Elementary School, Sakurai won the 9th Kyushu Elementary Student Golf Tournament in 2015 (6th grade).

After entering Yamazato Junior High School in 2016 (7th grade), Sakurai came in second in the Kyushu Junior High School Golf Championship Spring Tournament. In 2017 (8th grade), she placed third in the Kyushu Junior High School Golf Championship and second in the Kyushu Junior High School Golf Championship Spring Tournament. In 2018 (9th grade), she settled for second place in the Kyushu Junior High School Golf Championship, the Kyushu Junior Golf Championship (12-14 years old), and the Kyushu Junior High School Golf Championship Spring Tournament. In 2018, she made a professional tournament debut by participating in the LPGA of Japan StepUp Tour, Kyushu Mirai Construction Group Ladies Tournament, but unfortunately fell two strokes short of the cut-line.

As a junior (11th grade) of Nagasaki Nihon University High School, Sakurai won the 1st OBS Kyushu Girls Junior Golf Tournament (2020) and then the 2nd OBS Kyushu Girls Junior Golf Tournament as a senior (12th grade, 2021) the following year to make it two years in a row. As the winner of the OBS Kyushu Women's Junior Golf Tournament, she was granted exemption for the Fundokin Ladies Tournament on the LPGA of Japan StepUp Tour, and finished tied for 43rd place in 2020 and tied for 27th place in 2021. In the following week, in 2021, she competed in the Kyushu Mirai Construction Group Ladies Golf Tournament Madonoume Cup and finished tied for 41st place. In her senior year, she also won the 51st Kyushu Women's Championship, the 40th Kyushu Junior Golf Championship (Competition), the two major women's Kyushu amateur titles, and then the National High School Golf Championship Individual Division to become the high school women's national champion. Her first JLPGA tournament was the 2021 Hoken no Madoguchi Ladies Tournament, but she was not able to make the cut. In the fall of the same year, she passed the LPGA of Japan Tour Player Certification Test on her first try at the age of 17, with a 12th-place tie finish, and was officially accepted as a LPGA of Japan Tour member of the 94th class on 1 Jan. 2022.

== Professional career ==
=== 2022 ===
Managing only 117th place in the QT (qualifying test) rankings, Sakurai played the 2022 season on the LPGA of Japan StepUp Tour, which is the lower developmental circuit for players without LPGA of Japan Tour exemptions, as the main field of professional competition.

Sakurai started her pro career with a 3rd-place tie at the Rashink･NINGINEER/RKB Ladies tournament (29-30 March). In June, she won the ECC Ladies Golf Tournament (1–3 June), her first professional tournament win with a 13-under par score, shaking off same-age rival Haruka Kawasaki.

At the Hokkaido Meiji Cup (5–7 August), only in her second entry in a tournament of the LPGA of Japan Tour after becoming a pro, she began the final day in the final group for the first time and tied for 1st place with a birdie at hole 17 on the final day. However, she lost out to the winner Min-Young Lee, who birdied the final hole, to finish in a 2nd-place tie.

Sakurai's first overseas tournament was the Simone Asia Pacific Cup (18–20 August, Indonesia), where she finished in a 4th-place tie in the individual competition (70-75-68=213) and 5th place in the team competition teaming up with Maria Shinohara. Through her experience there, she began showing interest in playing in the LPGA.

She won the Sanyoshimbun Ladies Cup (16–18 September) and The Chugoku Shimbun Chupea Ladies Cup (22–24 September) back-to-back. After placing a 26th-place tie in the next match, she won the Kanehide Miyarabi Open (6–8 October) and then the Japan-Taiwan Friendship Udon-Ken Ladies Golf Tournament (14–16 October) for another two straight titles, making it 4 wins in a span of only 5 weeks.

Overall, she won five tournaments, the most seasonal wins in the history of the LPGA of Japan StepUp Tour, in only 16 tournaments. She is also the youngest player ever to be ranked first in total prize money for a season, earning over 25,000,000 yen, also the most ever in a season, for the LPGA of Japan StepUp Tour. In addition to her victories, she had five top-10 finishes and never failed to make the cut. In the second half of the final day of the Japan-Taiwan Friendship Udon-Ken Ladies Golf Tournament, where she had a total score of 63, she shot a 28, including two eagles for the latter half, setting a record for the lowest half score on the LPGA of Japan StepUp Tour.

Besides her accomplishments on the LPGA of Japan StepUp Tour, she played in five LPGA of Japan Tour tournaments, made one top-5 finish, was 92nd in earnings, and was 94th in Mercedes point rankings.

At the JLPGA Awards 2022, Sakurai was awarded for her 1st place finish in the LPGA of Japan StepUp Tour Money Rankings.

=== 2023 ===
In January, Sakurai won the Hitachi Ladies Classic of the LPGA of Taiwan Tour (6–8 January), her second overseas tour event, beating out Wu Chia-yen.

In February, Sakurai signed an affiliation agreement with the Nitori Corporation.

In March, Sakurai signed a management contract with the Cross-Bee Sports Agency. She also signed a sportswear contract with the "and per se" brand.

Having finished first in prize money in the LPGA of Japan StepUp Tour the previous year, Sakurai was awarded LPGA of Japan Tour exemption for the first half of the 2023 season. She started off the season missing the cut in the first two tournaments but gradually caught on and she recorded her first top-10 finish at the KKT Cup Vantelin Ladies Open (14-16 April), finishing tied for 5th place.

At the Shiseido Ladies Open (29 June – 2 July), Sakurai started off the final day one stroke behind the leaders. Consecutive birdies at the 17th and 18th holes on the final day enabled her to catch up with the then-new leader Shiho Kuwaki at 10-under par (71, 71,69, 69 = 278) and she won the playoff on the second hole for her first win on the LPGA of Japan Tour. With this win, she was awarded an exemption for the remainder of the season and the following season.

Four weeks later at the Rakuten Super Ladies (27–30 July), Sakurai started off the final day in second place, two strokes behind the leader, and she shot a 66 to come from behind to win her second tournament with a score of twenty-one under par (67, 69, 65, 66 = 267). With this win, at the age of 19 years and 167 days old, she became the 4th youngest player, behind Ai Miyazato, Nasa Hataoka and Yuka Saso, to gain 2 career LPGA of Japan Tour wins. She also shot 11 consecutive rounds in the 60s from the second round of the Daito Kentaku e-Heya Net Ladies (20–23 July) tournament through the Rakuten Super Ladies and the Hokkaido Meiji Cup (4–6 August) tournaments to the second round of the CAT Ladies tournament (18–20 August), tying the all-time record set by Yui Kawamoto in 2019.

On 3 August, Sakurai was informed that she had qualified for the AIG Women's Open (10–13 August) by the category of the top 50 of the Rolex world rankings due to higher rankers qualifying through other means. She started off the first round at 2 under-par for a 7th-place tie, but could not hold on and finished at 5 over-par for a 50th-place tie.

At the Golf 5 Ladies Tournament (1–3 September), Sakurai started play in the final group on the final day, trailing by one stroke. After 17 holes she was tied with Miyū Yamashita who had already holed out and Sakura Koiwai who was in the same final group at nine under par. She birdied the final hole to take over the sole lead and win her third tournament, again as a come-from-behind victory with a score of ten under par (69, 68, 69 = 206). With this win, she became the 3rd youngest player, behind Miyazato, and Hataoka at the age of 19 years and 202 days old to gain three career LPGA of Japan Tour wins.

At the Fujitsu Ladies Golf Tournament (13–15 October), with a forecast for heavy rain suggesting rainout on the third and final day, Sakurai scored a birdie on the crucial final hole on the second day to finish off with a self-record tie of 63 with nine birdies and no bogeys, taking the sole lead overcoming a three-stroke deficit. On the final day, the tournament was suspended immediately after start-off due to heavy rainfall and later rained out, and thus she earned her fourth win with a score of twelve under par (69, 63 = 132). With this win, she raised her world ranking to 45th place (16 October 2023).

With the four come-from-behind triumphs, Sakurai became only the third teenager along with Miyazato (8) and Hataoka (5, including an LPGA win) to win four or more LPGA or LPGA of Japan Tour titles, and second only to Miyazato (5 in 2004) in seasonal victories by a teenager. With the 4 wins, she was also runner-up in the number of titles to season champion Yamashita who recorded 5, with the final one coming in the final tournament of the 2023 season to break the tie with Sakurai at 4.

Sakurai finished the year competing in 37 tournaments with 4 wins and 8 other top 10 finishes. She was 6th in prize money and 5th in Mercedes point rankings, and she earned her first priority seed for the following year.

Sakurai was selected as a member of the 6-member JLPGA team of the Hitachi 3Tours Championship (10 December) and contributed to their victory.

Sakurai was also awarded with the GTPA Rookie of the Year Award that was given to the season best LPGA of Japanese member within two years of their debut, and a JLPGA Fighting Spirit Award for her performance, which she narrowly missing out on the Annual Queen Award.

=== 2024 ===
On 23 March, Sakurai scored her first hole-in-one after turning pro on the second day of the Axa Ladies Golf Tournament (22–24 March) at hole 2 (par-3, 11th hole due to an in-start).

In late May, Sakurai participated in her first U.S. Women's Open (30 May – 2 June), qualifying via her top-75 in the Rolex world ranking. She shot scores of 75 and 74 for a 9-over-par 76th place tie finish, and was 1 stroke shy of the cut line.

After an underwhelming first half of the season, Sakurai shot a 65 on the first day of the Minebea–Mitsumi Ladies Hokkaido Shimbun Cup (4–7 July) to round out the day at a tie for first place, her first-ever first-day top finish. She ended up in sole 2nd place, with a score of fourteen under par (65, 71, 69, 69 = 274), four strokes behind the winner Haruka Kawasaki. This was her second runner-up finish, the previous one coming in 2022, her rookie year. The group of Sakurai, Kawasaki, and Amiyu Ozeki happened to be the first final day final group to consist of members having passed the JLPGA Player Certification Test in the same year and being of the same age group.

Sakurai qualified for the final major of the year, the AIG Women's Open (22–25 August) via the category of the top 50 of the Women's World Golf Rankings by virtue of higher-rankers qualifying through other criteria. She shot 82, her worst since becoming a pro, then 78 for a total of 160 (+16), and missed the cut.

At the Fujitsu Ladies Golf Tournament (11–13 October), competing as the defending champion, Sakurai entered play on the final day in first place (tied) for the first time on the LPGA of Japan Tour with a score of ten under par. Although she had a slow start, she showed a strong second half to catch up with Miyū Yamashita, who eventually won the tournament by winning the playoff and Ayaka Furue who finished in 2nd place, to briefly tie for the lead at 13 under par. However, she was unable to improve her score thereafter and ended up in a 3rd place tie with a score of 9 under par (65, 69, 70 = 204).

Sakurai finished the year competing in 34 tournaments with 5 top 10 finishes. She was 27th in prize money and 28th in Mercedes point rankings, and she earned her second consecutive priority seed. By making the top 30 in point rankings, she automatically qualified for the 2025 Japan Women's Open Golf Championship.

=== 2025 ===
Starting from a 6th place tie at 6 under par on the final day of the Earth Mondahmin Cup (26–29 June), Sakurai stretched her score to eleven under par with five front-nine birdies and tied for the lead during play at holes 11 and 12. However, with three back-nine bogeys, she ended up in a 5th-place tie at 8 under par (70, 73, 67, 70 = 280).

At the CAT Ladies tournament (22–24 August), with veteran JLPGA player Yumiko Yoshida as her caddie, Sakurai scored a seven-under-par 65 for a 1st place tie on day 1, and a two-under-par 70 on day two to take the sole lead. This was the first time for her to start the final day alone at the top. She had a tough final day, falling three strokes off the lead after 11 holes, but managed to hold on for a six-way tie after 17 holes. On the final hole, her bunker recovery shot missed a chip-in-eagle by a mere few inches, and she had to settle for an easy ensuing birdie that eventually turned out to be enough to break the tie for a nine under par score (65, 70, 72 = 207), securing her fifth win, her first wire-to-wire win, to end a two-year drought.

In the Qualifying Stage (15–18 October, Plantation Golf & Country Club, Venice, Florida) for next season's LPGA Tour card, Sakurai recorded a 64 (8 birdies), tied for the best score of the final day, and finished with a total of fourteen under par (69, 71, 70, 64 = 274) with under par scores through all four days. She moved up from a tie for 15th place the previous day to a tie for first place to qualify for the Final Qualifying Stage.

Sakurai finished the year competing in 32 tournaments with 1 win and 2 other top 5 finishes. She was 34th in prize money and 42th in Mercedes point rankings, and she earned her third consecutive priority seed.

At the LPGA Q-Series Final Qualifying Stage (4–9 December, RTJ Magnolia Grove GC, Mobile, Alabama, USA), Sakurai overcame illness that could have led to her withdrawal had not the first day been postponed due to heavy rain to finish in a 10th place tie with a score of 8 under par (69, 69, 69, 71 = 278) in a tournament shortened from 90 to 72 holes due to repeated heavy rain and bad course conditions, and successfully earned her LPGA Tour card for eligibility for the coming season. Thus, just as she qualified for the LPGA of Japan Tour on her first attempt, Sakurai has also qualified for the LPGA Tour on her first bid.

=== 2026 ===
On 2 March, Oji Holdings announced that they had signed an affiliation agreement with Sakurai.

Sakurai's rookie LPGA season was cut short after the Lotte Championship (1–4 October) with 27.080 CME points and a ranking of 169th place. She took place in 14 tournaments and made the cut 5 times, with her best outing being 42nd place tie at the Riviera Maya Open at Mayakoba (30 April – 3 May).

== Personal life ==
Sakurai's parents named her Kokona (心那) with the hope that she would grow up to be a good-hearted and gentle person, with the original meanings of "koko" or more generally "kokoro" (心) being “mind” and “na” (那) being "beauty" and "richness." She is known for her two small but distinctive beauty marks, one on the left side of her chin and the other by her nose, also on the left, and a large dimple on her left cheek.

Her brother Go has become a PGA of Japan Tour certified teaching professional after graduating from Chuo University.

Sakurai has been an admirer of fellow golfer Kim Hyo-joo, and her sentiments towards her became stronger ever since seeing her play in person at the Simone Asia Pacific Cup in 2022. Her power meal is Japanese-style grilled eel (kabayaki). She likes confectionery made with red bean paste with the bean skin removed. She listens to Japanese pop music and is a big fan of the Japanese idol girl group Sakurazaka46, and goes to their concerts in her off-season. She likes to play Animal Crossing and has played Pokémon (video game series) games since she was a child.

Personal sponsors are Oji Holdings, the National Federation of Agricultural Cooperative Associations (Zen-Noh), the Vortex Corporation, the Axa Life Insurance Company, the PCA Corporation, and Shimabara Tenobe Somen (Shimate).

== Amateur wins ==
- 2015 9th Kyushu Elementary Student Golf Tournament
- 2020 1st OBS Kyushu Junior Golf Tournament
- 2021 2nd OBS Kyushu Junior Golf Tournament, 51st Kyushu Women's Championship Competition, 40th Kyushu Junior Golf Championship Competition, National High School Golf Championship Tournament

== Professional wins (11) ==
=== LPGA of Japan Tour wins (5) ===
No.	Date	Tournament	Winning score	To par	Margin of victory	Runner(s)-up
1	2 Jul 2023	Shiseido Ladies Open	71-71-68-68=278	−10	Playoff	(Japan) Shiho Kuwaki
2	30 Jul 2023	Rakuten Super Ladies	67-69-65-66=267	−21	1 stroke	(South Korea) Lee Min-young
3	3 Sep 2023	Golf5 Ladies	69-68-69=206	−10	1 stroke	(Japan) Sakura Koiwai (Japan) Miyū Yamashita
4	15 Oct 2023	Fujitsu Ladies^{a}	69-63=132	−12	1 stroke	(Japan) Miyuu Abe (Japan) Chisato Iwai
5	24 Aug 2025	CAT Ladies	65-70-72=207	−9	1 stroke	(Japan) Saiki Fujita (Japan) Sora Kamiya (Japan) Megumi Kido (Japan) Shiho Kuwaki (Japan) Kana Nagai

^{a} Tournament shortened due to adverse conditions.

=== LPGA of Japan Step Up Tour wins (5) ===
No.	Date	Tournament	Winning score	To par	Margin of victory	Runner(s)-up
1	3 Jun 2022	ECC Ladies Golf Tournament	68-67-68=203	−13	2 strokes	(Japan) Yuka Nii (Japan) Haruka Kawasaki
2	18 Sep 2022	Sanyoshimbun Ladies Cup	68-65-68=201	−15	5 strokes	(Japan) Maria Shinohara (Japan) Yumeka Kobayashi (Japan) Naruha Miyata
3	24 Sep 2022	Chugoku Shimbun Chupea Ladies Cup	70-65-70=205	−11	1 stroke	(Japan) Fumie Tsune
4	8 Oct 2022	Kanehide Miyarabi Open	66-68-72=206	−10	3 strokes	(Japan) Yukari Nishiyama
5	16 Oct 2022	Japan-Taiwan Friendship Udon-Ken Ladies Golf Tournament^{a}	67-69-63=199	−17	7 strokes	(Japan) Ririna Staiano (Japan) Yukari Nishiyama

^{a} Co-sanctioned by the Taiwan LPGA Tour.

=== LPGA of Taiwan Tour wins (2) ===
No.	Date	Tournament	Winning score	To par	Margin of victory	Runner(s)-up
1	16 Oct 2022	Japan-Taiwan Friendship Udon-Ken Ladies Golf Tournament^{a}	67-69-63=199	−17	7 strokes	(Japan) Ririna Staiano (Japan) Yukari Nishiyama
2	8 Jan 2023	Hitachi Ladies Classic	70-71-67=208	−8	2 strokes	(Taiwan) Chia-Yen Wu

^{a} Co-sanctioned by the LPGA of Japan Step Up Tour.

== Results in LPGA majors ==
Tournament	2023	2024
Chevron Championship		
U.S. Women's Open		CUT
Women's PGA Championship		
The Evian Championship		
Women's British Open	T50	CUT

Did not play

CUT = missed the half-way cut
T = tied

== World ranking ==
Position in Women's World Golf Rankings at the end of each calendar year.

Year	Ranking	Source
2022	154	
2023	51	
2024	120	
2025	193	
