= Damien Knabben Cup =

The Damien Knabben Cup Futsal Invitational Tournament in Taipei (Chinese: 克拉本室內五人制足球邀請賽), or simply Damien Knabben Cup, is an invitational futsal tournament held by Taipei Futsal Association. It started from 2006, under the name Taipei International Invitational Futsal Tournament (Chinese: 台北國際五人制足球邀請賽). In 2007, it was renamed to Damien Knabben Cup in remembrance of Damien Knabben, the late manager of Chinese Taipei national futsal team who died on April 2, 2006.

== Summaries ==
Year	Winner	Runner-up	Third Place	Fourth Place
2006; Details	(Japan) D.C. Asahikawa	(Chinese Taipei) Taipei City	Chinese Taipei	Macau
2007; Details	(Chinese Taipei) Taipei City	(Belgium) ZVK Eisden Dorp	Thailand	International United

== See also ==
- List of sporting events in Taiwan
