= 2006 Taipei International Invitational Futsal Tournament =

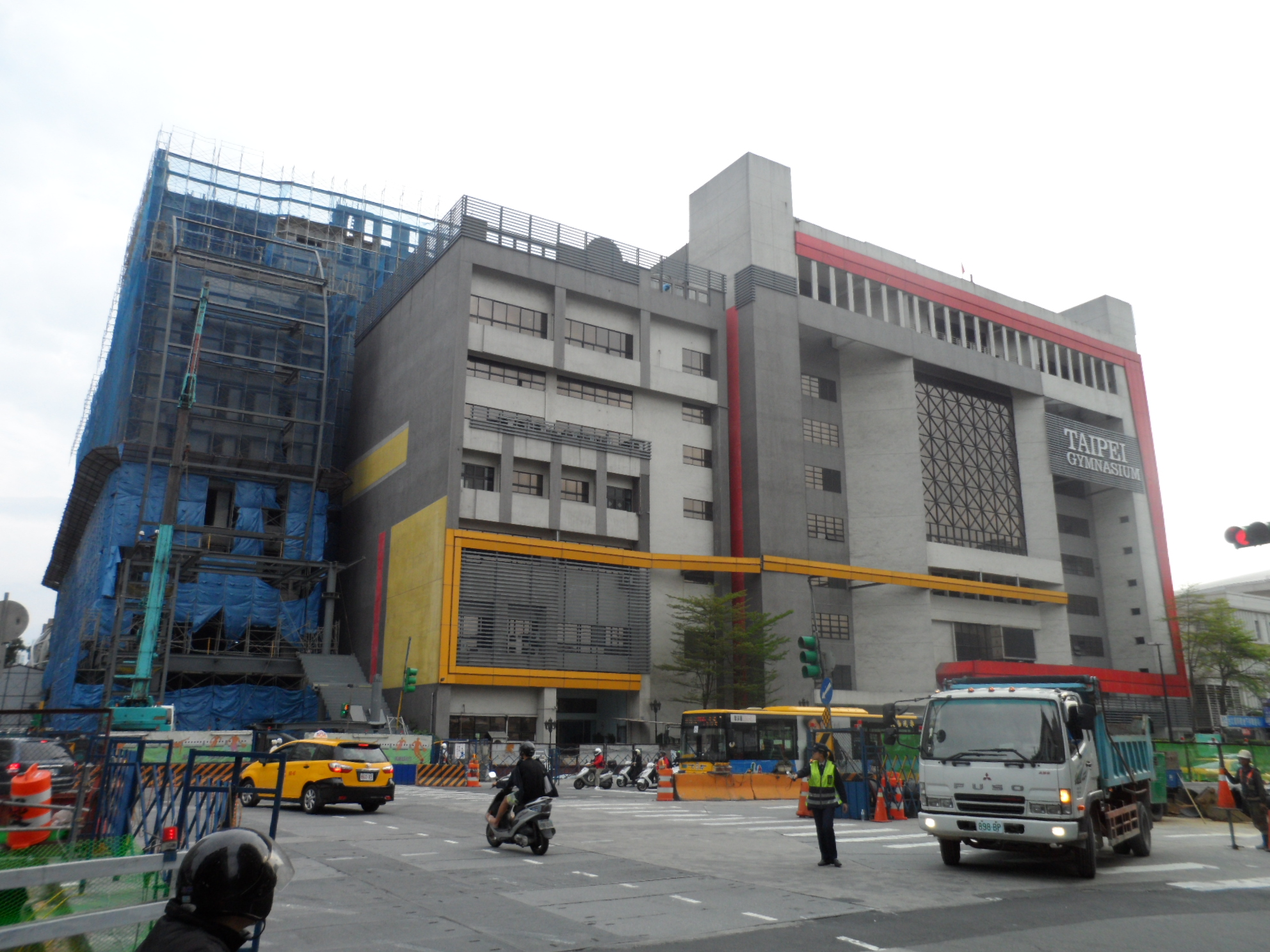
Taipei Gymnasium

The Taipei International Invitational Futsal Tournament (Chinese: 台北國際五人制足球邀請賽) was held from October 27 to October 29, 2006 at Taipei Gymnasium in Taipei, Taiwan. It was the first international futsal event in Taipei after holding the 2004 FIFA Futsal World Championship. Finally, Japanese D.C Asahikawa Futsal Club beat Macau, Chinese Taipei, and Taipei Select team and won the first place.

Before the tournament was held, the organizers originally wanted to invite Korea national team as well as Macau national team and D.C Asahikawa. However, the Korea team declined the invitation, and thus Taipei Futsal Association's select team was included as the replacement.

In December, Chinese Taipei Football Association was fined US$ 10,000 by AFC Disciplinary Committee for failing to seek the AFC’s approval for the tournament which violates Article 11-V (Tournaments) of the Regulations governing the application of AFC Statutes ‘All tournaments involving more than two local or national teams (clubs or representative teams) which belong to difference member associations must be approved by the Confederation.'

== Tournament table ==
Pos	Team	Pld	W	D	L	GF	GA	GD	Pts
1	D.C Asahikawa (Japan)	3	3	0	0	26	4	+22	9
2	Taipei Select	3	2	0	1	8	8	0	6
3	Chinese Taipei	3	1	0	2	5	9	−4	3
4	Macau	3	0	0	3	0	18	−18	0

== Results ==
October 27, 2006
18:00

Taipei Select	2 - 8	D.C Asahikawa
Wang Chi-cheng (王吉成) 15'; Ho Kuo-chen (何國禎) ?'	(Results)	Y. Saga (嵯峨祐太) 16'; T. Takayama (高山剛寬) 19'; Y. Sakashi (酒師幸裕) 19'; H. Sasaki (佐佐木洋文) 22'; Y. Saga (嵯峨祐太) 29'; N. Arai (荒井紀弘) ?' ? ?' ? ?'

Taipei Gymnasium, Taipei

October 27, 2006
20:00

Chinese Taipei	3 - 0	Macau
Chang Yung-hsien (張永憲) 11'; Wang Chih-sheng (王志聖) 16'; Wang Yung-lun (王庸倫) 35'	(Results)

Taipei Gymnasium, Taipei

October 28, 2006
16:00

D.C Asahikawa	11 - 0	Macau
T. Takayama (高山剛寬) 2'; Y. Sakashi (酒師幸裕) 8'; T. Takayama (高山剛寬) ?'; T. Takayama (高山剛寬) 34'; Y. Sakashi (酒師幸裕) ?'; Y. Saga (嵯峨祐太) ?'; Y. Saga (嵯峨祐太) ?' ? ?' ? ?' ? ?' ? ?'	(Results)

Taipei Gymnasium, Taipei

October 28, 2006
18:00

Chinese Taipei	0 - 2	Taipei Select
	(Results)	Tseng Ching-yao (曾敬耀) 20'; Tseng Ching-yao (曾敬耀) 36'

Taipei Gymnasium, Taipei

October 29, 2006
16:00

Taipei Select	4 - 0	Macau
Chen Chia-ho (陳嘉和) 8'; Tseng Ching-yao (曾敬耀) 18'; Chen Chia-ho (陳嘉和) 26'; Chang Chien-ying (張仟縈) 38'	(Results)

Taipei Gymnasium, Taipei

October 29, 2006
18:00

Chinese Taipei	2 - 7	D.C Asahikawa
Chang Fu-hsiang (張福祥) 18'; Chang Fu-hsiang (張福祥) 37'	(Results)	Y. Saga (嵯峨祐太) 1'; Y. Saga (嵯峨祐太) 5'; N. Oda (太田二郎) 12'; D. Kanno (菅野大祐) 31'; Y. Saga (嵯峨祐太) 32'; H. Sasaki (佐佐木洋文) ?'; H. Sasaki (佐佐木洋文) 39'

Taipei Gymnasium, Taipei

== See also ==
- Chinese Taipei Football Association
- Taipei Football Association
- Macau Football Association
- List of sporting events in Taiwan
