= Asian Judo Championships =

Judo competition

- Current event or competition: 2026 Asian Judo Championships

Competition details
- Discipline: Judo
- Type: Annual
- Organiser: Judo Union of Asia (JUA)

History
- Most wins: Japan - 349 medals (166 gold medals)
- Most recent: 2026 Ordos City
- Next edition: 2027 Kuwait City

Asian Judo Championships is the Judo Asian Championship organized by the Judo Union of Asia.

The men's tournament began in 1966 and was held approximately every four years, until 1991, when it became an annual event (except in the years when the Asian Games have been held.) The women's tournament was first staged in 1981, and it has been held with the men's tournament every year, except in 1984/5.

== List of tournaments ==
Tournaments
Year	Date	competition		City and host country	Venue	# Countries	# Athletes	Ref.
Year	Date	♂	♀	City and host country	Venue	# Countries	# Athletes	Ref.
1966	28–29 May	●	-	Manila, Philippines	Rizal Memorial Coliseum	8	29	
1970	29–31 May	●	-	Kaohsiung, Taiwan	Kaohsiung Gymnasium			
1974	30 October–4 November	●	-	Seoul, South Korea	Jangchung Arena			
1981	15–18 July	●	●	Jakarta, Indonesia	Senayan Basketball Hall		10	
1984	1–4 April	●	-	Kuwait City, Kuwait		14		
1985	23–24 March	-	●	Tokyo, Japan	Kodokan			
1988	19–22 July	●	●	Damascus, Syria				
1991	9–10 November	●	●	Osaka, Japan	Osaka Prefectural Gymnasium	17	157	
1993	13–14 November	●	●	Macau	Macau Forum	19	182	
1995	20–22 November	●	●	New Delhi, India	Indira Gandhi Arena	21		
1996	9–10 November	●	●	Ho Chi Minh City, Vietnam	Phan Dinh Phung Stadium			
1997	22–23 November	●	●	Manila, Philippines	Ninoy Aquino Stadium			
1999	25–26 June	●	●	Wenzhou, China				
2000	26–28 May	●	●	Osaka, Japan	Osaka Municipal Central Gymnasium	29		
2001	14–15 April	●	●	Ulaanbaatar, Mongolia	National Wrestling Hall	20	148	
2003	31 October – 1 November	●	●	Jeju, South Korea	Halla Gymnasium			
2004	15–16 May	●	●	Almaty, Kazakhstan	Baluan Sholak Palace of Culture and Sports	22		
2005	14–15 May	●	●	Tashkent, Uzbekistan	Yunusobod Sports Hall			
2007	17–18 May	●	●	Kuwait City, Kuwait	Qadsia Sports Hall			
2008	26–27 April	●	●	Jeju, South Korea	Halla Gymnasium			
2009	23–24 May	●	●	Taipei, Taiwan	Taipei Arena			
2010	22 April	●	●	Guangzhou, China		32	242	
2011	5–7 April	●	●	Abu Dhabi, United Arab Emirates	UAE WJJ Federation Hall	30	209	
2012	27–29 April	●	●	Tashkent, Uzbekistan	Uzbekistan Sport Hall	26	107	
2013	19–21 April	●	●	Bangkok, Thailand	Bangkok Youth Centre	28	218	
2015	13–15 May	●	●	Kuwait City, Kuwait	Al-Qadsia Indoor Stadium	30	206	
2016	14–16 April	●	●	Tashkent, Uzbekistan	Uzbekistan Sport Hall	31	233	
2017	26–28 May	●	●	Hong Kong, China	Hong Kong Velodrome	29	244	
2019 (Note: Asian-Pacific Judo Championships)	20–23 April	●	●	Fujairah, United Arab Emirates	Fujairah Centre	39	271	
2021	4–9 April	●	●	Bishkek, Kyrgyzstan	Sport Venue Gazprom	29	182	
2022	4–7 August	●	●	Nur-Sultan, Kazakhstan	Zhaksylyk Ushkempirov Martial Arts Palace	17	168	
2024	20–23 April	●	●	Hong Kong, China	Star Hall, KITEC	36	273	
2025	24–28 April	●	●	Bangkok, Thailand	MCC Hall	29	289	
2026	16–19 April	●	●	Ordos City, China	Ordos Sports Development Center Gymnasium	19	197	
2027	19–22 April	●	●	Kuwait City, Kuwait				

== Judo Team Asian Championships ==
Year	Location	Men			Women		
Year	Location	Gold	Silver	Bronze	Gold	Silver	Bronze
2011	Abu Dhabi, United Arab Emirates	South Korea	Japan	Kazakhstan; Uzbekistan	Japan	Mongolia	South Korea; China
2012	Tashkent, Uzbekistan	South Korea	Japan	Kazakhstan; Uzbekistan	Japan	Mongolia	South Korea; Chinese Taipei
2013	Bangkok, Thailand	South Korea	Japan	Mongolia; Kazakhstan	Japan	Mongolia	South Korea; Kazakhstan
2015	Kuwait City, Kuwait	Japan	Uzbekistan	Kazakhstan; South Korea	Japan	South Korea	Chinese Taipei; Mongolia
2016	Tashkent, Uzbekistan	Uzbekistan	Mongolia	Japan; Kazakhstan	Japan	Mongolia	China; Kazakhstan
2017	Hong Kong, Hong Kong	South Korea	Mongolia	Iran; Japan	Japan	Mongolia	Chinese Taipei; South Korea

=== Mixed Team ===
Year	Location	Gold	Silver	Bronze	
2019	Fujairah, United Arab Emirates	Japan	South Korea	Mongolia	China
2021	Bishkek, Kyrgyzstan	South Korea	Kazakhstan	Uzbekistan	China
2022	Nur-Sultan, Kazakhstan	Japan	Mongolia	Kazakhstan	China
2024	Hong Kong, China	Japan	Mongolia	Kazakhstan	Uzbekistan
2025	Bangkok, Thailand	Japan	Uzbekistan	South Korea	Mongolia

== Medal table ==
Rank	Nation	Gold	Silver	Bronze	Total
1	Japan	166	83	100	349
2	South Korea	87	90	122	299
3	China	54	35	96	185
4	Mongolia	22	42	90	154
5	Uzbekistan	15	18	52	85
6	Kazakhstan	14	24	77	115
7	North Korea	12	20	31	63
8	Iran	12	14	28	54
9	Chinese Taipei	2	30	73	105
10	Tajikistan	2	10	11	23
11	Hong Kong	1	2	7	10
12	United Arab Emirates	1	0	2	3
13	Indonesia	0	4	15	19
14	India	0	4	11	15
14	Kyrgyzstan	0	4	11	15
16	Turkmenistan	0	3	9	12
17	Kuwait	0	0	10	10
17	Philippines	0	0	10	10
19	Syria	0	0	4	4
20	Australia	0	0	3	3
21	Pakistan	0	0	2	2
21	Thailand	0	0	2	2
23	Bangladesh	0	0	1	1
23	Lebanon	0	0	1	1
23	Malaysia	0	0	1	1
23	Myanmar	0	0	1	1
23	Singapore	0	0	1	1
23	Vietnam	0	0	1	1
Totals (28 entries)		388	383	772	1,543
