= 1980 Asian Taekwondo Championships =

- Venue: Municipal Gymnasium
- Location: Taipei, Taiwan
- Dates: 14–16 November 1980

Champions
- Men: South Korea

The 1980 Asian Taekwondo Championships were the 4th edition of the Asian Taekwondo Championships, and were held in Taipei from 14 to 16 November, 1980.

== Medal summary ==
Event	Gold	Silver	Bronze
Finweight (−48 kg)	Lee Jin-woo; South Korea	Su Chen-chia; Taiwan	Chia Pheng Pheng; Singapore
Finweight (−48 kg)	Lee Jin-woo; South Korea	Su Chen-chia; Taiwan	Li Chi Hung; Hong Kong
Flyweight (−52 kg)	Yang Ki-mo; South Korea	Cheok Siew Ghee; Singapore	Wu Han-chie; Taiwan
Flyweight (−52 kg)	Yang Ki-mo; South Korea	Cheok Siew Ghee; Singapore	Nasser Al-Dmoor; Jordan
Bantamweight (−56 kg)	Choi Seong-yong; South Korea	Lie Shun-long; Taiwan	Moussa Bediwi; Jordan
Bantamweight (−56 kg)	Choi Seong-yong; South Korea	Lie Shun-long; Taiwan	None awarded
Featherweight (−60 kg)	Lee Jun-kul; South Korea	Lie Kau-ming; Taiwan	Li Ping Hong; Hong Kong
Featherweight (−60 kg)	Lee Jun-kul; South Korea	Lie Kau-ming; Taiwan	Roy Tang; Singapore
Lightweight (−64 kg)	Kim Yong-kuk; South Korea	Lee Hong-hsian; Taiwan	Mohammad Mubarak Mahdi; Jordan
Lightweight (−64 kg)	Kim Yong-kuk; South Korea	Lee Hong-hsian; Taiwan	Angelo Pablo Sahagan; Guam
Welterweight (−68 kg)	Kim Jung-gook; South Korea	Jerry Finley; Guam	Wang Chien-hsie; Taiwan
Welterweight (−68 kg)	Kim Jung-gook; South Korea	Jerry Finley; Guam	Richard Goh; Singapore
Light middleweight (−73 kg)	Oh Il-nam; South Korea	Wang Chi-chad; Taiwan	Najeh Ibrahim; Jordan
Light middleweight (−73 kg)	Oh Il-nam; South Korea	Wang Chi-chad; Taiwan	Brunei
Middleweight (−78 kg)	Huang Ming-te; Taiwan	Jo Nam-jae; South Korea	Ahmad Al-Waneh; Jordan
Middleweight (−78 kg)	Huang Ming-te; Taiwan	Jo Nam-jae; South Korea	Lin King Wan; Hong Kong
Light heavyweight (−84 kg)	Jung Chan; South Korea	Kassem Duwailan; Jordan	None awarded
Light heavyweight (−84 kg)	Jung Chan; South Korea	Kassem Duwailan; Jordan	None awarded
Heavyweight (+84 kg)	Kang Yong-ku; South Korea	Suen Hsin-nen; Taiwan	Low Fang Lian; Singapore
Heavyweight (+84 kg)	Kang Yong-ku; South Korea	Suen Hsin-nen; Taiwan	None awarded

== Medal table ==
Rank	Nation	Gold	Silver	Bronze	Total
1	South Korea	9	1	0	10
2	Taiwan	1	6	2	9
3	Jordan	0	1	5	6
4	Singapore	0	1	4	5
5	Guam	0	1	1	2
6	Hong Kong	0	0	3	3
7	Brunei	0	0	1	1
Totals (7 entries)		10	10	16	36

== See also ==
- List of sporting events in Taiwan
