= Pei-Yun Chien =

Taiwanese professional golfer

Personal information
- Nationality: Chinese Taipei
- Born: 22 October 1990 (age 36) Taipei, Taiwan
- Height: 5 ft 5 in (165 cm)

Career
- Sport: Golf
- Turned professional: 2012
- Current tours: LPGA Tour (joined 2017); Taiwan LPGA Tour
- Former tour: Symetra Tour (joined 2012)
- Professional wins: 7

Number of wins by tour
- Epson Tour: 3
- Other: 4

Best results in LPGA major championships
- Chevron Championship: T40: 2024
- Women's PGA C'ship: T21: 2022
- U.S. Women's Open: T50: 2019
- Women's British Open: T71: 2024
- Evian Championship: T7: 2024

Achievements and awards
- Taiwan LPGA Tour Order of Merit winner: 2014, 2024

Pei-Yun Chien (born 22 October 1990) is a Taiwanese professional golfer who plays on the LPGA Tour.

== Early life and amateur career ==
Chien started playing golf at the age of 12.

== Professional career ==
Chien played on the Symetra Tour in 2012 before focusing on playing in Asia, where she won the 2014 Taiwan LPGA Tour Order of Merit.

In 2016, she returned to the Symetra Tour and won the inaugural Kansas City Championship to finish 10th on the Symetra Tour money list and earn LPGA status for 2017. In her LPGA Tour rookie season, she tied for 3rd at the Marathon Classic and finished seventh in the rookie of the year standings. In 2018, she had a season-best finish of a tie for 6th at the Lotte Championship.

In Taiwan, where she won the 2020 Taiwan Mobile Ladies Open and the 2021 Hitachi Ladies Classic, and was runner-up at the event the following year, behind Tsai Pei-Ying. In 2021, she played on the Epson Tour, earning a win at the Circling Raven Championship. She tied for 4th at the LPGA Q-Series to return to the LPGA Tour for the 2022 season. She finished tied 4th at the 2022 ISPS Handa World Invitational.

In 2023, Chien shot a 5-under-par round of 67 to lead after the first round at the Chevron Championship ahead of six golfers, including world number 2 Nelly Korda. In September, she led the Kroger Queen City Championship, before finishing in a tie for 5th.

== Professional wins (7) ==
=== Symetra Tour wins (3) ===
No.	Date	Tournament	Winning score	To par	Margin of victory	Runner(s)-up	Ref.
1	31 Jul 2016	Kansas City Championship^{a}	68-67=135	−9	1 stroke	(United States) Jackie Stoelting (United States) Emma Talley	
2	4 Oct 2020	Symetra Classic	64-68-70=202	−14	1 stroke	(United States) Lucy Li	
3	29 Aug 2021	Circling Raven Championship	67-65-68=200	−16	1 stroke	(United States) Demi Runas	

^{a} Tournament shortened to 36 holes due to inclement weather.

=== Taiwan LPGA Tour wins (4) ===
No.	Date	Tournament	Winning score	To par	Margin of victory	Runner(s)-up	Ref.
1	25 Dec 2020	Taiwan Mobile Ladies Open	67-69-70=206	−10	8 strokes	(Taiwan) Hsu Wei-ling	
2	10 Jan 2021	Hitachi Ladies Classic	68-65-69=202	−14	7 strokes	(Taiwan) Yu-Sang Hou (a)	
3	31 Dec 2022	CTBC Invitational	74-73-72=219	+3	2 strokes	(Taiwan) Wu Chia-yen	
4	7 Jan 2024	Hitachi Air Conditioning Ladies Classic	72-68-67=207	−9	2 strokes	(Taiwan) Babe Liu	

== Results in LPGA majors ==
Results not in chronological order.

Tournament	2016	2017	2018	2019	2020	2021	2022	2023	2024	2025	2026
Chevron Championship		CUT	CUT	CUT				T49	T40	T76	T59
U.S. Women's Open	CUT	CUT	CUT	T50							CUT
Women's PGA Championship		CUT	CUT	T60	CUT		T21	CUT	T35	T61	
The Evian Championship		T40	72		NT		CUT	T36	T7	T43	
Women's British Open		CUT			CUT		CUT	CUT	T71	CUT	

Top 10
Did not play

CUT = missed the half-way cut
NT = no tournament
"T" = tied

=== Summary ===
Tournament	Wins	2nd	3rd	Top-5	Top-10	Top-25	Events	Cuts made
Chevron Championship	0	0	0	0	0	0	7	4
U.S. Women's Open	0	0	0	0	0	0	5	1
Women's PGA Championship	0	0	0	0	0	1	8	4
The Evian Championship	0	0	0	0	1	1	6	5
Women's British Open	0	0	0	0	0	0	6	1
Totals	0	0	0	0	1	2	32	15
