= 2019 LPGA of Korea Tour =

The 2019 LPGA of Korea Tour was the 42nd season of the LPGA of Korea Tour, the professional golf tour for women operated by the Korea Ladies Professional Golf' Association. The season began at Twin Doves Golf Club in Vietnam in December 2018, and ended at Woojeong Hills Country Club in Cheonan.

== Schedule ==
The number in parentheses after winners' names show the player's total number wins in official money individual events on the LPGA of Korea Tour, including that event.

Dates	Tournament	Host city	Prize fund (KRW)	Winner	WWGR pts	Notes
Dec 7–9	Hyosung Championship	(Vietnam) Binh Duong	700,000,000	(South Korea) Park Ji-young (2)	18.0	
Jan 17–20	Taiwan Women's Golf Open	(Taiwan) Kaohsiung	US$800,000	(South Korea) Jeon Mi-jeong (3)	18.5	New tournament Co-sanctioned with LPGA of Taiwan
Apr 4–7	Lotte Rent-a-Car Women's Open	(South Korea) Seogwipo	600,000,000	(South Korea) Cho A-yean (1)	17.0	
Apr 12–14	Celltrion Queens Masters	(South Korea) Ulsan	800,000,000	(South Korea) Cho Jeong-min (4)	17.5	New tournament
Apr 19–21	Nexen-Saintnine Masters	(South Korea) Gimhae	600,000,000	(South Korea) Lee Seong-yeoun (1)	17.0	
Apr 25–28	**CreaS F&C KLPGA Championship**	(South Korea) Yangju	1,000,000,000	(South Korea) Choi Hye-jin (5)	19.0	
May 3–5	KyoChon Honey Ladies Open	(South Korea) Yeoju	500,000,000	(South Korea) Park So-yeon (1)	16.0	
May 10–12	NH Investment & Securities Ladies Championship	(South Korea) Yongin	700,000,000	(South Korea) Choi Hye-jin (6)	18.0	
May 15–19	Doosan Match Play Championship	(South Korea) Chuncheon	700,000,000	(South Korea) Kim Ji-hyun (1)	19.0	
May 24–26	E1 Charity Open	(South Korea) Icheon	800,000,000	(South Korea) Lim Eun-bin (1)	18.0	
May 31 – Jun 2	Lotte Cantata Ladies Open	(South Korea) Seogwipo	600,000,000	(South Korea) Kim Bo-ah (2)	17.5	
Jun 7–9	S-Oil Championship	(South Korea) Jeju	700,000,000	(South Korea) Choi Hye-jin (7)	16.5	
Jun 13–16	**Kia Motors Korea Women's Open Championship**	(South Korea) Incheon	1,000,000,000	(South Korea) Lee Da-yeon (3)	19.0	
Jun 20–23	BC Card-Hankyung Ladies Cup	(South Korea) Pocheon	700,000,000	(South Korea) Cho Jeong-min (5)	18.5	
Jun 28–30	McCol-Yongpyong Resort Open	(South Korea) Pyeongchang	600,000,000	(South Korea) Choi Hye-jin (8)	17.0	
Jul 5–7	Asiana Airlines Open	(China) Weihai	700,000,000	(South Korea) Lee Da-yeon (4)	17.5	Co-sanctioned with China LPGA Tour
Jul 12–14	MY Munyoung Queens Park Championship	(South Korea) Yeoju	600,000,000	(South Korea) Kim A-lim (2)	18.5	
Aug 9–11	Jeju Samdasoo Masters	(South Korea) Jeju	800,000,000	(South Korea) Ryu Hae-ran (1)	19.5	
Aug 16–18	Bogner MBN Ladies Open	(South Korea) Yangpyeong	600,000,000	(South Korea) Park Min-ji (3)	18.0	
Aug 22–25	High1 Resort Ladies Open	(South Korea) Jeongseon	800,000,000	(South Korea) Lim Hee-jeong (1)	18.0	
Aug 29 – Sep 1	**Hanwha Classic**	(South Korea) Chuncheon	1,400,000,000	(South Korea) Park Chae-yoon (2)	20.5	
Sep 6–8	KG-Edaily Ladies Open	(South Korea) Yongin	600,000,000	(South Korea) Park Gyo-rin (1)	18.0	
Sep 19–22	All for You-Renoma Championship	(South Korea) Icheon	800,000,000	(South Korea) Lim Hee-jeong (2)	18.5	
Sep 27–29	OK! Savings Bank Pak Se-ri Invitational	(South Korea) Chuncheon	800,000,000	(South Korea) Cho A-yean (2)	19.0	
Oct 3–6	Hana Financial Group Championship	(South Korea) Incheon	1,500,000,000	(South Korea) Jang Ha-na (11)	24.0	New tournament
Oct 10–13	**Hite Jinro Championship**	(South Korea) Yeoju	1,000,000,000	(South Korea) Ko Jin-young (11)	22.0	
Oct 17–20	**KB Financial Star Championship**	(South Korea) Icheon	1,000,000,000	(South Korea) Lim Hee-jeong (3)	19.5	
Oct 24–27	BMW Ladies Championship	(South Korea) Busan	US$2,000.000	(South Korea) Jang Ha-na (12)	56.0	Co-sanctioned with LPGA Tour
Oct 31 – Nov 3	SK Networks Seokyung Ladies Classic	(South Korea) Seogwipo	800,000,000	(South Korea) Choi Hye-jin (9)	19.0	
Nov 8–10	ADT CAPS Championship	(South Korea) Cheonan	600,000,000	(South Korea) Ahn Song-yi (1)	19.0	
Nov 16–17	LF Hazzys Point Championship	(South Korea) Jangheung	170,000,000	(South Korea) Lee So-young	n/a	Unofficial tournament
Nov 29 – Dec 1	Orange Life Champions Trophy Park In-bee Invitational	(South Korea) Gyeongju	1,200,000,000	(South Korea) KLPGA Tour	n/a	Team match play, KLPGA v LPGA Tour Korean players

Events in bold are majors.
