= Taipei Gymnasium =

Gymnasium in Songshan, Taipei, Taiwan

- 臺北體育館
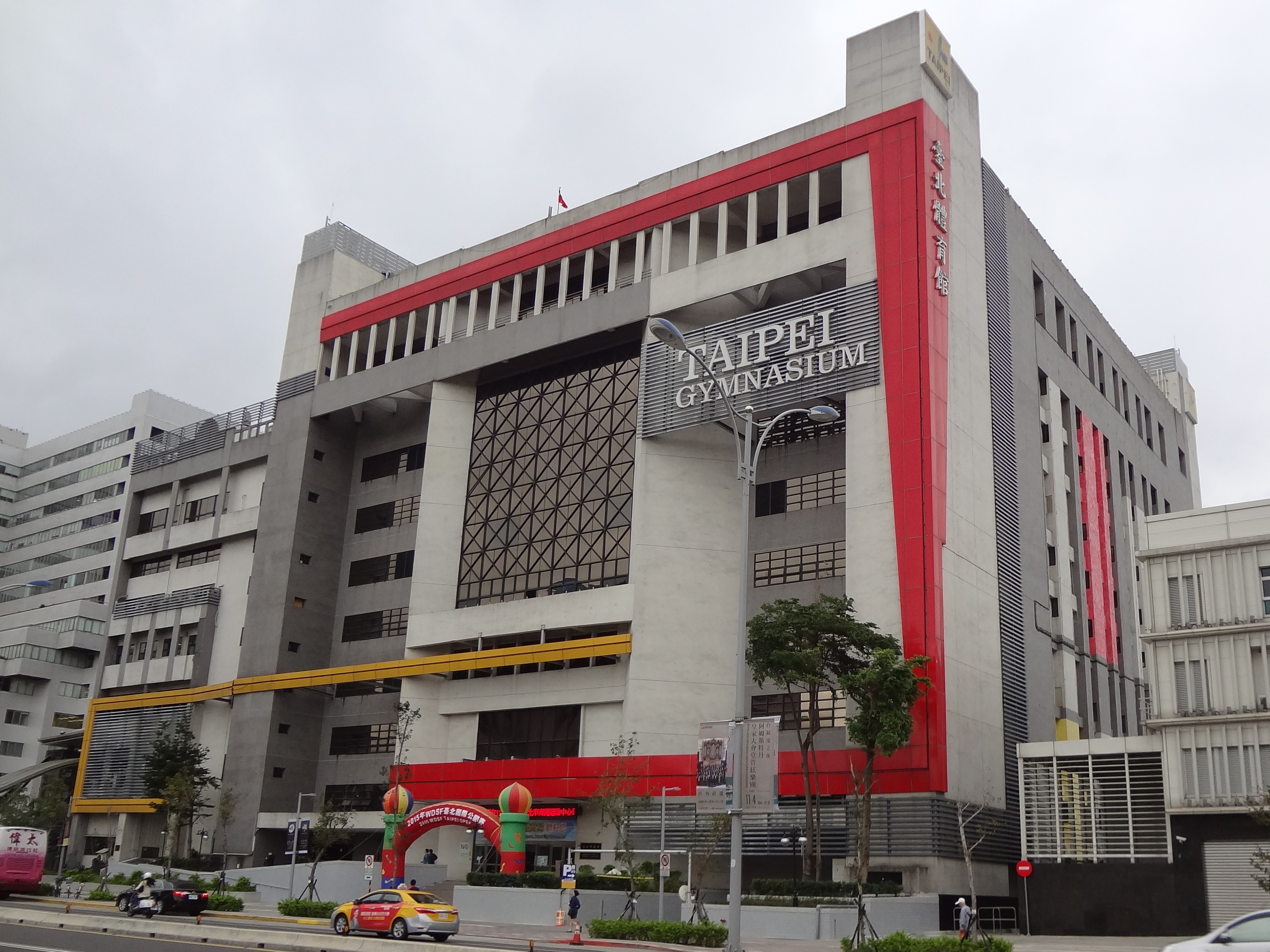
- Interactive map of Taipei Gymnasium
- Location: Songshan, Taipei, Taiwan
- Coordinates: 25°03′04.7″N 121°33′07.5″E
- Owner: Taipei City Government
- Capacity: 2,300 visitors
- Type: gymnasium

Construction
- Opened: 1994

The Taipei Gymnasium (traditional Chinese: 臺北體育館; simplified Chinese: 台北体育馆; pinyin: Táiběi Tǐyùguǎn) is a gymnasium in Songshan District, Taipei, Taiwan.

== History ==
The gymnasium was opened in 1994 and renovated in 2008.

== Architecture ==
The gymnasium is housed in a 7-story building with a total floor area of 5,128 m^{2}. It consists of facilities and equipment for ball games, conference room, audio center, classrooms for martial arts and aerobic, offices, badminton and billiard room. Ball games area has 1,340 seating capacity and badminton area has 1,000 seating capacity. The building also consists of two basement floors.

== Sporting events ==
Several major sporting events had been fully or partially held in Taipei Gymnasium, such as:

- 2006 Taipei International Invitational Futsal Tournament
- 2009 Summer Deaflympics
- 2014 Taipei City International Boxing Tournament
- 2014 William Jones Cup
- 2017 Summer Universiade
- 2023 Asian Men's Volleyball Challenge Cup

== Transport ==
The gymnasium is accessible from Taipei Arena Station of the Taipei Metro.

== See also ==
- Sports in Taiwan
