= 2010 CPBL–KBO Club Championship =

The CPBL–KBO Club Championship 2010 was contested between the champions of Chinese Professional Baseball League's Taiwan Series, and the Korea Baseball Organization's Korean Series on Saturday, 4–5 November 2010. The game was played at the Taichung Intercontinental Baseball Stadium. The two-game title ended in a draw.

== Game summary ==
=== Game 1 (2010) ===
Team	1	2	3	4	5	6	7	8	9	R	H	E
SK Wyverns	0	1	1	0	0	0	0	0	0	2	8	0
Brother Elephants	0	1	0	0	0	0	0	0	2	3	6	0
WP: Carlos Castiyo LP: Song Eun-bum; Home runs: BR: None; SK: Lee Ho-joon (1)

=== Game 2 (2010) ===
Team	1	2	3	4	5	6	7	8	9	R	H	E
Brother Elephants	0	0	0	0	0	0	0	2	0	2	7	2
SK Wyverns	0	0	0	0	0	2	3	0	X	5	8	2
WP: Ken Kadokura LP: Jim Magrane

== See also ==
- List of sporting events in Taiwan
