= Taiwan LPGA Tour =

Women's professional golf tour

- Sport: Golf
- Founded: 2003
- President: Yi-Chen Liu
- Country: Taiwan
- Headquarters: Taipei
- Website: tlpga.org.tw/en

The Taiwan LPGA Tour is a professional golf tour for women organized by the Taiwan Ladies Professional Golfers' Association (TLPGA).

== History ==
The Taiwan Professional Golf Association (TPGA) formed a "Ladies Committee" that organized three small golf tournaments for the golf ladies in 2000. The following year the committee became independent from the TPGA and was renamed the Taiwan Ladies Professional Golf Association (TLPGA). The longest running tournament is the TLPGA & Royal Open which was founded in 2002 and takes place annually at the Royal Golf Club. The Taiwan LPGA Tour was launched in 2003 and the Order of Merit was first implemented in 2006.

=== Cooperation ===
In 2011, the TLPGA began a cooperation with the Ladies Asian Golf Tour (LAGT) and several tournaments including the TLPGA & Royal Open, the Hitachi Ladies Classic and the Taifong Ladies Open appeared on the LAGT schedule, and since 2015 the reverse is true for the Hong Kong Ladies Open. In 2016, TLPGA co-sanctioned two tournaments, the Florida's Natural Charity Classic and Chico's Patty Berg Memorial, with the Symetra Tour. That year the TLPGA total purse grew to TWD 199 million. Since 2017, TLPGA co-sanctions the Japan Taiwan Friendship Udon-Ken Ladies Golf Tournament with the LPGA of Japan Step Up Tour, and beginning in 2019 TLPGA and LPGA of Korea co-sanctions the Taiwan Women's Golf Open with a purse of US$800,000.

Starting in 2011, Taiwan also hosts the LPGA Taiwan Championship, an LPGA Tour event with a purse of US$2.2 million.

=== WWGR ===
In 2014, TLPGA received official recognition from the Women's World Golf Rankings, and performances on the Taiwan LPGA Tour carry WWGR points like the eight other major women's tours (LPGA, JLPGA, KLPGA, LET, ALPG, China LPGA Tour, Symetra Tour and LET Access Series).

== Schedule and results ==
=== 2026 season ===
The following table lists official events during the 2026 season.

Date	Tournament	Location	Purse (NT$)	Winner	WWGR points	Other tours (Note: FUT − Epson Tour; JLPGA − LPGA of Japan Tour; JSU − LPGA of Japan Step Up Tour; LET − Ladies European Tour; LPGT − Ladies Philippine Golf Tour.)
6 Feb	ICTSI Philippines Ladies Master	Philippines	US$200,000	(Taiwan) Huang Ching	3.40	LPGT
15 Mar	Taiwan Foxconn Ladies Golf Tournament	Taoyuan	US$2,000,000	(Japan) Fuka Suga	18.52	JLPGA
17 Apr	Nan-Tou Golf and Country Club Futures	Nantou	1,200,000	(Japan) Yuria Sonoda	1.90	
23 Apr	KGI Bank TLPGA Futures	Taoyuan	1,500,000	(Taiwan) Shih Cheng-hsuan	2.10	
16 May	CTBC Ladies Open	Taoyuan	¥50,000,000	(Thailand) Sherman Santiwiwatthanaphong	3.70	JSU
24 May	WPG Ladies Open	Taoyuan	15,000,000	(Taiwan) Tsai Pei-ying	6.00	
5 Jun	Taiwan Prosperity Ladies Open	Changhua	3,000,000	(Taiwan) Yu Han-hsuan	3.00	
14 Jun	FireKeepers Casino Hotel Championship	United States	US$200,000	(United States) Lauryn Nguyen	3.30	FUT
21 Jun	Great Lakes Championship	United States	US$250,000	(Mexico) Lauren Olivares	3.40	FUT
26 Jun	Friends of TLPGA & Royal Open	Hsinchu	6,000,000	(Thailand) Pakin Kawinpakorn	2.70	
7 Aug	YTS and Suncity Futures	Hsinchu	1,200,000	(Japan) Harumi Yoshikuwa	2.10	
4 Sep	Strait Cup Ladies Classic	China	CN¥800,000	(Thailand) Budsabakorn Sukapan	3.10	CLPGA
25 Sep	Kenda Tire TLPGA Open	Taichung	4,000,000	(Taiwan) Vivian Hou	2.70	
15 Oct	KGI Bank TLPGA Futures	Changhua	1,500,000	(Thailand) Pakin Kawinpakorn	2.00	
1 Nov	Wistron Ladies Open	Taoyuan	US$1,000,000	(South Africa) Casandra Alexander	14.90	LET
13 Nov	Sampo Ladies Open	Tainan	7,500,000	(Taiwan) Lin Jie-en	3.00	
27 Nov	Party Golfers Ladies Open	Hsinchu	5,000,000			
11 Dec	TAYA Group Ladies Open	Tainan	10,000,000			
18 Dec	Taiwan Mobile Ladies Open	Changhua	10,000,000			

=== 2025 season ===
The following table lists official events during the 2025 season.

Date	Tournament	Location	Purse (NT$)	Winner	WWGR points	Other tours (Note: FUT − Epson Tour; JSU − LPGA of Japan Step Up Tour; KLPGA − Korea Ladies Professional Golf Association; LET − Ladies European Tour; LPGT − Ladies Philippine Golf Tour; TWN − Taiwan PGA Tour.)
12 Jan	Hitachi Air Conditioning Ladies Classic	Taoyuan	10,000,000	(Taiwan) Tsai Pei-ying	4	
14 Feb	ICTSI Worldwide Link Philippines Ladies Master	Philippines	US$200,000	(South Korea) Kim Ka-young	4	LPGT
2 Mar	Foxconn TLPGA Players Championship	Taoyuan	US$1,500,000	(South Korea) Hwang You-min	17.5	
17 Apr	HTCA Supreme Invitational	Hsinchu	5,000,000	(Taiwan) Sammy Liu	2	
10 May	WPG Ladies Open	Taoyuan	15,000,000	(Taiwan) Min Lee	6	
17 May	CTBC Ladies Open	Taoyuan	¥50,000,000	(Thailand) Patcharajutar Kongkraphan	4	JSU
6 Jun	Taiwan Prosperity Ladies Open	Changhua	3,000,000	(Thailand) Patcharajutar Kongkraphan	3	
8 Jun	FireKeepers Casino Hotel Championship	United States	US$225,000	(United States) Samantha Wagner	4	FUT
15 Jun	Great Lakes Championship	United States	US$250,000	(United States) Riley Smyth	4	FUT
19 Jun	Yichen Futures	Hsinchu	1,200,000	(Taiwan) Jan Tseng	2	
4 Jul	Friends of TLPGA Open	Hsinchu	3,500,000	(Taiwan) Teresa Lu	3	
26 Jul	Trust Golf Asian Mixed #1	Thailand	฿5,000,000	(Thailand) Thanyakon Khrongpha (n/a)	3 (Note: WWGR points at the Trust Golf Asian Mixed #1 were awarded based on the women's results only. Budsabakorn Sukapan was the highest-finishing woman and was awarded the 3 points.)	TWN (Note: Mixed event)
8 Aug	YTS and Suncity Futures	Hsinchu	1,200,000	(Taiwan) Jessica Peng	2	
16 Aug	Trust Golf Asian Mixed #2	Thailand	฿5,000,000	(Thailand) Tawit Polthai (n/a)	3 (Note: WWGR points at the Trust Golf Asian Mixed #2 were awarded based on the women's results only. Cholcheva Wongras was the highest-finishing woman and was awarded the 3 points.)	TWN
22 Aug	Trust Golf Asian Mixed #3	Thailand	฿5,000,000	(Thailand) Patcharajutar Kongkraphan	3	TWN
26 Sep	Kenda Tire TLPGA Open	Taichung	4,000,000	(Thailand) Cholcheva Wongras	3	
17 Oct	Jing-Mao Ladies Open	Hsinchu	3,000,000	(Thailand) Patcharajutar Kongkraphan	3	
26 Oct	Wistron Ladies Open	Taoyuan	US$1,000,000	(Taiwan) Yani Tseng	16	LET
7 Nov	Sampo Ladies Open	Tainan	7,500,000	(Taiwan) Chen Chih-min	3	
21 Nov	Party Golfers Ladies Open	Hsinchu	5,000,000	(Taiwan) Wenny Chang	4	
12 Dec	TAYA Group Ladies Open	Tainan	10,000,000	(Thailand) Patcharajutar Kongkraphan	4	
19 Dec	Taiwan Mobile Ladies Open	Changhua	10,000,000	(Thailand) Patcharajutar Kongkraphan	5	KLPGA (Note: Co-sanctioned by the Korea Ladies Professional Golf Association, but not listed as an official event on the 2025 LPGA of Korea Tour schedule.)

=== 2024 season ===
The following table lists official events during the 2024 season.

Date	Tournament	Location	Purse (NT$)	Winner	WWGR points	Other tours (Note: FUT − Epson Tour; JSU − LPGA of Japan Step Up Tour; LET − Ladies European Tour; LPGT − Ladies Philippine Golf Tour.)
7 Jan	Hitachi Air Conditioning Ladies Classic	Kaohsiung	10,000,000	(Taiwan) Pei-Yun Chien	4	
25 Feb	Foxconn TLPGA Players Championship	Taoyuan	US$1,000,000	(Japan) Haruka Kawasaki	14	
24 Apr	ICTSI Luisita Ladies International	Philippines	US$100,000	(Thailand) Patcharajutar Kongkraphan	2	LPGT
11 May	CTBC Ladies Open	Taoyuan	¥30,000,000	(Taiwan) Hsuan Chen	4	JSU
18 May	WPG Ladies Open	Taoyuan	12,000,000	(Thailand) Patcharajutar Kongkraphan	3	
7 Jun	Taiwan Prosperity Ladies Open	Hsinchu	3,000,000	(Taiwan) Shih Cheng-hsuan	3	
16 Jun	Otter Creek Championship	United States	US$300,000	(United States) Savannah Vilaubi	5	FUT
23 Jun	Island Resort Championship	United States	US$262,500	(South Korea) Joo Soo-bin	6	FUT
2 Aug	Friends of TLPGA Open	New Taipei	3,500,000	(Taiwan) Wenny Chang	3	
13 Sep	Kenda Tire TLPGA Open	Taichung	3,000,000	(Thailand) Ornnicha Konsunthea	3	
27 Sep	Da Da Digital Ladies Open	New Taipei	3,000,000	(Taiwan) Wenny Chang	3	
13 Oct	Wistron Ladies Open	Taoyuan	US$1,000,000	(Switzerland) Chiara Tamburlini	12	LET
18 Oct	Jing-Mao Ladies Open	Hsinchu	3,000,000	(Thailand) Patcharajutar Kongkraphan	3	
8 Nov	Sampo Ladies Open	Tainan	6,000,000	(Thailand) Patcharajutar Kongkraphan	3	
15 Nov	Party Golfers Ladies Open	Hsinchu	5,000,000	(Taiwan) Chen Ling-jie	3	
13 Dec	TAYA Group Ladies Open	Tainan	6,000,000	(Taiwan) Tsai Pei-ying	3	
20 Dec	Taiwan Mobile Ladies Open	Changhua	8,000,000	(Taiwan) Hsu Wei-ling	4	

=== 2023 season ===
The following table lists official events during the 2023 season.

Date	Tournament	Location	Purse (NT$)	Winner	WWGR points	Other tours (Note: FUT − Epson Tour; JSU − LPGA of Japan Step Up Tour; LPGT − Ladies Philippine Golf Tour; THAILPGA − Thai LPGA Tour.)
8 Jan	Hitachi Ladies Classic	Taoyuan	10,000,000	(Japan) Cocona Sakurai	4	
24 Feb	Anvaya Cove Ladies International	Philippines	US$100,000	(Philippines) Bianca Pagdanganan	2	LPGT
13 May	CTBC Ladies Open	Taoyuan	¥30,000,000	(Japan) Mio Kotaki	3	JSU
20 May	WPG Ladies Open	Taoyuan	10,000,000	(Thailand) Patcharajutar Kongkraphan	3	
11 Jun	FireKeepers Casino Hotel Championship	United States	US$200,000	(China) Siyun Liu	4	FUT
25 Jun	Island Resort Championship	United States	US$225,000	(Taiwan) Tsai Ching Tseng	4	FUT
29 Jun	Friends of TLPGA Open	New Taipei	3,000,000	(Thailand) Patcharajutar Kongkraphan	2	
27 Jul	Jing-Mao Ladies Open	Hsinchu	3,000,000	(Taiwan) Juliana Hung	3	
4 Aug	GRIN Cup Charity Open	New Taipei	3,300,000	(Thailand) Patcharajutar Kongkraphan	3	
8 Sep	BGC Thailand LPGA Masters	Thailand	฿4,000,000	(Thailand) Wassawan Sangkapong	3	THAILPGA
22 Sep	Kenda Tire TLPGA Open	Changhua	3,000,000	(Thailand) Chonlada Chayanun	2	
29 Sep	Da Da Digital Ladies Open	New Taipei	3,000,000	(Taiwan) Chang Ya-chun	2	
15 Oct	Udon-Ken Ladies Golf Tournament	Japan	¥20,000,000	(Japan) Seira Oki	3	JSU
29 Oct	Wistron Ladies Open	Taoyuan	US$800,000	(Taiwan) Vivian Hou	6	
10 Nov	Party Golfers Ladies Open	Hsinchu	4,000,000	(Taiwan) Chen Ling-jie	3	
17 Nov	Sampo Ladies Open	Tainan	4,500,000	(Taiwan) Wang Li-ning	3	
22 Dec	Taiwan Mobile Ladies Open	Changhua	5,000,000	(Taiwan) Juliana Hung	3	

=== 2022 season ===
The following table lists official events during the 2022 season.

Date	Tournament	Location	Purse (NT$)	Winner	WWGR points	Other tours (Note: FUT − Epson Tour; JSU − LPGA of Japan Step Up Tour; THAILPGA − Thai LPGA Tour.)
9 Jan	Hitachi Ladies Classic	Taoyuan	10,000,000	(Taiwan) Tsai Pei-ying	6	
21 May	WPG Ladies Open	Taoyuan	10,000,000	(Taiwan) Hsin Lee	2	
10 Jun	Jing-Mao Ladies Open	Hsinchu	3,000,000	(Taiwan) Hsin Lee	2	
18 Jun	Ann Arbor's Road to the LPGA	United States	US$200,000	(Finland) Kiira Riihijarvi	4	FUT
26 Jun	Island Resort Championship	United States	US$200,000	(Taiwan) Ssu-Chia Cheng	3	FUT
30 Jul	GRIN Cup Charity Open	New Taipei	3,300,000	(Taiwan) Juliana Hung	2	
9 Sep	BGC Thailand LPGA Masters	Thailand	฿4,000,000	(Thailand) Patcharajutar Kongkraphan	2	THAILPGA
23 Sep	Kenda Tire TLPGA Open	Changhua	3,000,000	(Taiwan) Juliana Hung	2	
30 Sep	Da Da Digital Ladies Open	New Taipei	3,000,000	(Taiwan) Chen Yu-ju	2	
16 Oct	Udon-Ken Ladies Golf Tournament	Japan	¥20,000,000	(Japan) Cocona Sakurai	3	JSU
11 Nov	Sampo Ladies Open	Tainan	4,000,000	(Taiwan) Tsai-ching Tseng	2	
18 Nov	Party Golfers Ladies Open	Hsinchu	3,500,000	(Taiwan) Sammy Liu	2	
17 Dec	Wistron Ladies Open	Taoyuan	US$500,000	(Taiwan) Chang Ya-chun	3	
23 Dec	Taiwan Mobile Ladies Open	New Taipei	5,000,000	(Taiwan) Wu Chia-yen	3	
31 Dec	CTBC Invitational	Kaohsiung	5,000,000	(Taiwan) Pei-Yun Chien	3	

=== 2021 season ===
The following table lists official events during the 2021 season.

Date	Tournament	Location	Purse (NT$)	Winner	WWGR points
10 Jan	Hitachi Ladies Classic	Taoyuan	10,000,000	(Taiwan) Pei-Yun Chien	6
10 Sep	Kenda Tire TLPGA Open	Changhua	3,000,000	(Taiwan) Juliana Hung	2
26 Sep	CTBC Invitational	New Taipei	5,000,000	(Taiwan) Wu Chia-yen	2
8 Oct	Sampo Ladies Open	New Taipei	4,000,000	(Taiwan) Juliana Hung	2
23 Oct	Wistron Ladies Open	Taoyuan	10,000,000	(Taiwan) Wu Chia-yen	2
5 Nov	Party Golfers Ladies Open	Hsinchu	3,000,000	(Taiwan) Wu Chia-yen	2
3 Dec	WPG Ladies Open	Taoyuan	6,000,000	(Taiwan) Min Lee	3
24 Dec	Taiwan Mobile Ladies Open	New Taipei	5,000,000	(Taiwan) Wei-Ling Hsu	3

== Order of Merit ==
The Order of Merit was first launched by the TLPGA in 2006. From 2006 to 2011, it was based on points. Beginning in 2012, it has been based on prize money, denominated in New Taiwan dollars.

Year	Winner	Points
2006	(Taiwan) Weng Yvonne	667
2007	(Taiwan) Tai Yu-chuan	493
2008	(Taiwan) Shih Huei-ju	655
2009	(Taiwan) Tseng Hsiu-feng	942
2010	(Taiwan) Chen Hsien-hua	861
2011	(Taiwan) Yu Pei-lin	949
Year	Winner	Prize money (NT$)
2012	(Taiwan) Teresa Lu	4,460,000
2013	(Taiwan) Lu Ya-huei	1,981,538
2014	(Taiwan) Pei-Yun Chien	3,524,823
2015	(Taiwan) Kuo Ai-chen	2,932,332
2016	(Taiwan) Candie Kung	2,255,160
2017	(Taiwan) Min Lee	3,038,241
2018	(Taiwan) Chen Yu-ju	2,585,203
2019	(Taiwan) Tsai Pei-ying	4,204,254
2020	(Taiwan) Chen Yu-ju	2,784,100
2021	(Taiwan) Wu Chia-yen	4,903,850
2022	(Taiwan) Chang Ya-chun	3,618,392
2023	(Taiwan) Chang Ya-chun	2,929,241
2024	(Taiwan) Pei-Yun Chien	2,658,000
2025	(Taiwan) Yani Tseng	6,081,600

== See also ==
- LPGA Taiwan Championship (LPGA Tour)
- Taiwan Ladies Open (Ladies European Tour)
