= 2015 IIHF World U18 Championship Division III =

2015 IIHF U18 World Championship Division III

Tournament details
- Host countries: Taiwan; New Zealand
- Venues: 2 (in 2 host cities)
- Dates: 22–28 March 2015; 17–19 March 2015
- Teams: 9

The 2015 IIHF U18 World Championship Division III was two international under-18 ice hockey tournaments organised by the International Ice Hockey Federation. The Division III A and Division III B tournaments represent the sixth and the seventh tier of the IIHF World U18 Championship.

== Division III A ==
The Division III A tournament was played in Taipei City, Taiwan, from 22 to 28 March 2015.

=== Participants ===
Team	Qualification
Iceland	Placed 6th in 2014 Division II B and were relegated
Israel	Placed 2nd in 2014 Division III A
Chinese Taipei	Hosts, placed 3rd in 2014 Division III A
Bulgaria	Placed 4th in 2014 Division III A
Mexico	Placed 5th in 2014 Division III A
South Africa	Placed 1st in 2014 Division III B and were promoted

=== Standings ===
Pos	Team	Pld	W	OTW	OTL	L	GF	GA	GD	Pts	Promotion or relegation
1	Iceland	5	3	2	0	0	19	13	+6	13	Promoted to the 2016 Division II B
2	Mexico	5	1	2	2	0	17	10	+7	9	
3	Bulgaria	5	2	0	2	1	14	12	+2	8	
4	Chinese Taipei	5	2	1	0	2	28	16	+12	8	
5	Israel	5	2	0	1	2	16	15	+1	7	
6	South Africa	5	0	0	0	5	7	35	−28	0	Relegated to the 2016 Division III B

Source: IIHF

=== Results ===
All times are local. (National Standard Time – UTC+8)

22 March 2015; 13:00	Israel	1–2 OT (0–0, 0–1, 1–0, 0–1)	Mexico	Annex Ice Rink, Taipei City; Attendance: 252

Game reference
Benhar 49' / Goals / Beremjo 32', 62'

22 March 2015; 16:30	South Africa	0–5 (0–0, 0–2, 0–3)	Bulgaria	Annex Ice Rink, Taipei City; Attendance: 189

Game reference
Goals / Georgiev 37'; Semkok 39'; Dilkov 46'; Gatchey 49'; Genkov 52'

22 March 2015; 20:00	Chinese Taipei	1–3 (0–1, 0–1, 1–1)	Iceland	Annex Ice Rink, Taipei City; Attendance: 672

Game reference
Olafsson 14', 27'; Kristinsson 59' / Goals / Chiang 53'

23 March 2015; 13:00	Iceland	5–4 GWS (3–3, 0–1, 1–0, 0–0, 1–0)	Bulgaria	Annex Ice Rink, Taipei City; Attendance: 121

Game reference
Sverrisson 4'; Induss 5', 58'; Olafsson 6'; Arnason 64' / Goals / Georgiev 2'; Dilkov 10', 17'; Davidov 27'

23 March 2015; 16:30	Mexico	8–1 (5–0, 2–1, 1–0)	South Africa	Annex Ice Rink, Taipei City; Attendance: 154

Game reference
Beremjo 1', 12', 14', 22', 29'; Ramos 17'; Samano 59' / Goals / Ruthven 36'

23 March 2015; 20:00	Israel	6–8 (2–2, 3–2, 1–4)	Chinese Taipei	Annex Ice Rink, Taipei City; Attendance: 456

Game reference
Chu 3', 33', 40', 59'; Huang 13'; Chang 28'; Wang 40'; Chiang 45' / Goals / Revniaga 6'; Kafri 18', 23'; Bash 29'; Natalchenko 34'; Avrahaham 44'

25 March 2015; 13:00	Israel	5–2 (3–0, 1–2, 1–0)	South Africa	Annex Ice Rink, Taipei City; Attendance: 125

Game reference
Ignatovich 3', 5', 14'; Revniaga 33'; Avrahaham 50' / Goals / Compton 20', 35'

25 March 2015; 16:30	Iceland	3–2 GWS (0–1, 1–1, 1–0, 0–0, 1–0)	Mexico	Annex Ice Rink, Taipei City; Attendance: 232

Game reference
Olafsson 22'; Induss 59', 65' / Goals / Ramos 2'; Najera 38'

25 March 2015; 20:00	Chinese Taipei	3–4 (0–0, 2–3, 1–1)	Bulgaria	Annex Ice Rink, Taipei City; Attendance: 612

Game reference
Chiang 22'; Yin 37'; Huang 51' / Goals / Dikov 20'; Tchaliov 29'; Davidov 32'; Dilkov 45'

26 March 2015; 13:00	South Africa	4–5 (2–2, 1–0, 1–3)	Iceland	Annex Ice Rink, Taipei City; Attendance: 82

Game reference
Bremner 5', 58'; Schuurman 7'; Compton 21' / Goals / Kristveigarson 1'; Induss 18', 57'; Maack 50'; Kristinsson 56'

26 March 2015; 16:30	Bulgaria	0–2 (0–1, 0–0, 0–1)	Israel	Annex Ice Rink, Taipei City; Attendance: 102

Game reference
Goals / Bash 2'; Revniaga 49'

26 March 2015; 20:00	Mexico	3–4 OT (0–2, 1–1, 2–0, 0–1)	Chinese Taipei	Annex Ice Rink, Taipei City; Attendance: 513

Game reference
Beremjo 34'; Pierece 49', 59' / Goals / Tang 3'; Chu 10', 24'; Chen 63'

28 March 2015; 13:00	Bulgaria	1–2 GWS (0–0, 1–0, 0–1, 0–0, 0–1)	Mexico	Annex Ice Rink, Taipei City; Attendance: 278

Game reference
Dikov 21' / Goals / Aguierre 59'; Beremjo 65'

28 March 2015; 16:30	Iceland	3–2 (2–0, 1–2, 0–0)	Israel	Annex Ice Rink, Taipei City; Attendance: 359

Game reference
Altason 11'; Induss 14'; Sigrunarsson 23' / Goals / Sever 32'; Hoffman 33'

28 March 2015; 20:00	Chinese Taipei	12–0 (2–0, 3–0, 7–0)	South Africa	Annex Ice Rink, Taipei City; Attendance: 794

Game reference
Hsu 8', 57'; Liu 10', 56'; Chu 25', 29', 37', 40', 45', 55'; Chen 44'; Lu 48' / Goals

== Division III B ==
The Division III B tournament was played in Auckland, New Zealand, from 17 to 19 March 2015.

=== Participants ===
Team	Qualification
New Zealand	Hosts, placed 6th in 2014 Division III B and were relegated
Turkey	Placed 2nd in 2014 Division III B
Hong Kong	Placed 3rd in 2014 Division III B

=== Standings ===
Pos	Team	Pld	W	OTW	OTL	L	GF	GA	GD	Pts	Promotion or relegation
1	Turkey	2	2	0	0	0	14	5	+9	6	Promoted to the 2016 Division III A
2	New Zealand	2	1	0	0	1	12	10	+2	3	
3	Hong Kong	2	0	0	0	2	6	17	−11	0	

Source: IIHF

=== Results ===
All times are local. (New Zealand Daylight Time – UTC+13)

17 March 2015; 19:15	Hong Kong	5–8 (1–3, 2–1, 2–4)	New Zealand	Paradice Botany, Auckland; Attendance: 500

Game reference

Han Jonathan Yifeng
Goalies
Michael Jessup
Referee:
(United Kingdom) Dean Smith
Linesmen:
(United Kingdom) Oliver Finch
(Japan) Kensuke Kanazawa

	0–1	R. Vortanov (T. Carson-Pratt, H. Macharg) – 09:03
Cheng C.J.P. (Lo L.K., Lui H.M.H) – 9:29	1–1
	1–2	B. Harford – 16:33
	1–3	H. Johnston (R. Vortanov, H. Macharg) (PP) – 19:13
Lo L.K. (Lui H.M.H.) – 22:22	2–3
Cheng C.P.J. (Tse C.J.) (PP) – 34:44	3–3
	3–4	H. Macharg (B. Harford) (SH) – 37:21
Lo L.K. (Lui H.M.H.) – 41:15	4–4
	4–5	R. Vortanov – 44:51
	4–6	M. Kennedy (S. Brown) (SH) – 49:25
	4–7	H. Macharg (T. Carson-Pratt, T. Pugh) (SH) – 54:08
	4–8	S. Brown (M. Kennedy, T. Rooney) (SH) – 54:39
Lui H.M.H. (Tsang H.Y., Tse C.J.) (PP) – 57:12	5–8

6 min
Penalties
22 min
36
Shots
40

18 March 2015; 19:00	Turkey	9–1 (3–0, 5–0, 1–1)	Hong Kong	Paradice Botany, Auckland; Attendance: 200

Game reference

Muhammad Karagul
Goalies
Han Jonathan Yifeng
Referee:
(Japan) Shinichi Takizawa
Linesmen:
(United Kingdom) Oliver Finch
(New Zealand) Chris Watson

E. Ulas – 8:22	1–0
S. Kavaz (SH) – 19:05	2–0
H. Salt (O. Kars, F. Faner) (SH) – 19:31	3–0
C. Kaya (E. Savas) – 20:51	4–0
S. Bingol (B. Kizilkaya) – 22:37	5–0
B. Kizilkaya (F. Faner, H. Secer) – 31:36	6–0
F. Taygar (H. Secer) – 32:19	7–0
F. Taygar (H. Secer) – 35:52	8–0
	8–1	Cheng C.P.J. (Lee C.K.) – 49:39
C. Kaya (H. Secer) – 57:17	9–1

12 min
Penalties
8 min
52
Shots
17

19 March 2015; 19:00	New Zealand	4–5 (1–2, 1–1, 2–2)	Turkey	Paradice Botany, Auckland; Attendance: 700

Game reference

Michael Jessup
Goalies
Muhammad Karagul
Referee:
(United Kingdom) Dean Smith
Linesmen:
(Japan) Kensuke Kanazawa
(New Zealand) Chris Watson

L. Fraser (M. Rawiri) (PP) – 03:57	1–0
	1–1	S. Takar (S. Kavaz) (PP) – 07:33
	1–2	O. Kars (F. Faner, S. Kavaz) (PP) – 17:08
	1–3	S. Bingol (Y. Kars, F. Taygar) – 21:30
T. Carson-Pratt – 31:12	2–3
M. Kennedy (H. Macharg) (PP2) – 44:10	3–3
S. Brown (T. Rooney) – 46:42	4–3
	4–4	S. Kavaz (O. Kars) – 52:58
	4–5	B. Kizilkaya (H. Secer) – 53:56

24 min
Penalties
20 min
27
Shots
34

== See also ==
- List of sporting events in Taiwan
