= Tainan Historical Capital International Half Marathon =

Annual half marathon held in Tainan, Taiwan

- The Tainan Historical Capital International Half Marathon logo
- Location: Anping District, Tainan, Taiwan
- Event type: Road running
- Distance: Half marathon, Quarter marathon, 5K run
- Established: April 15, 2007; 19 years ago
- Website: www.tainanhalfmarathon.com

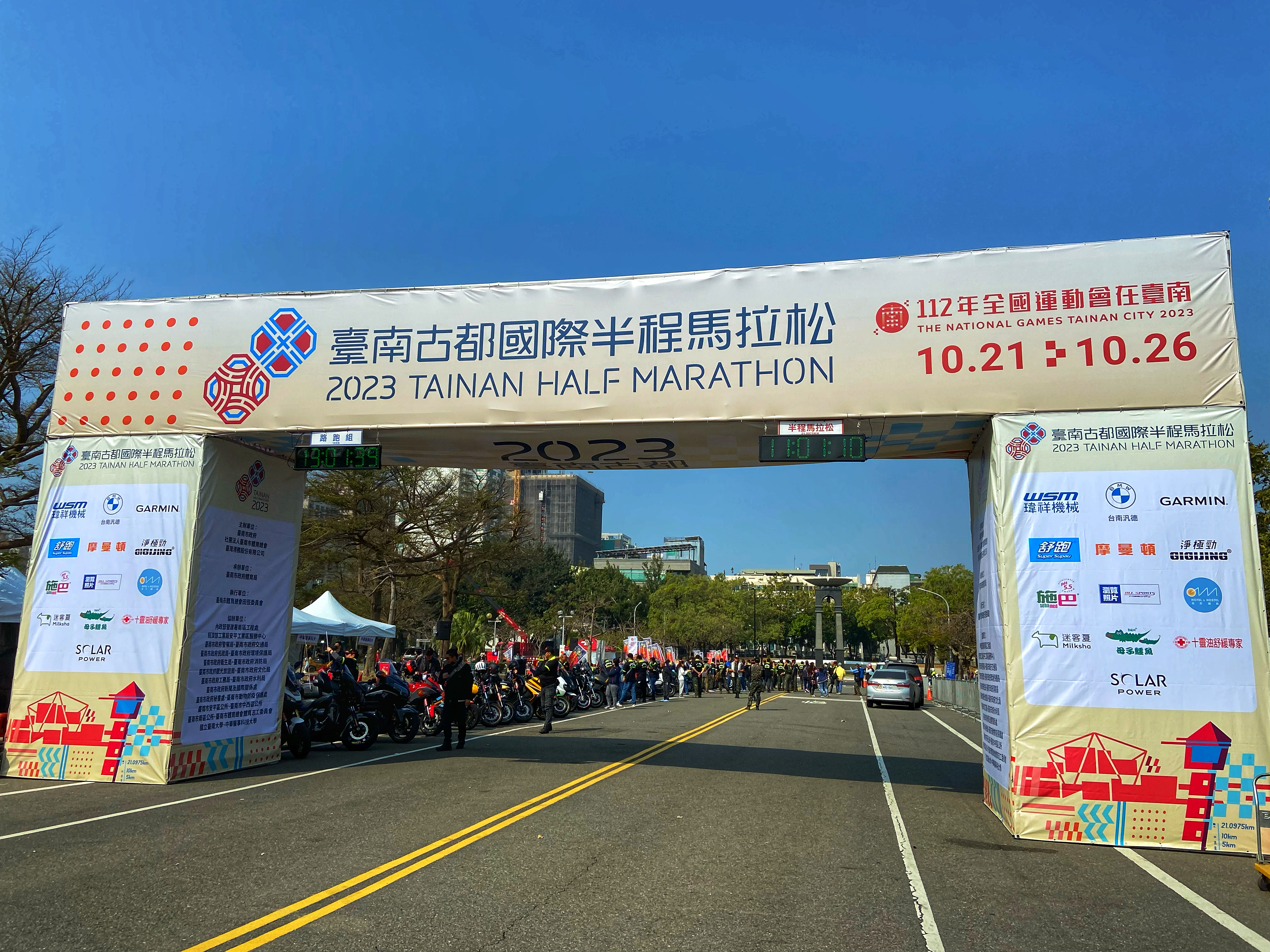
Start point of 2023 race

The Tainan Historical Capital International Half Marathon (Chinese: 臺南古都國際半程馬拉松), which began in 2007, is an annual half marathon held in Tainan, Taiwan. The race, which is being organized by the Chinese Taipei Athletics Association and the Tainan City Government, is currently preparing to apply for World Athletics Label Road Races status.

== Records ==
Marathon (The division was dissolved following the 2019 event)

- Men:
- Women:

Half Marathon

- Men:
- Women:

Quarter Marathon (The division was added to the 2019 event)

- Men:
- Women:

== Past winners ==
Course record (in bold)

=== Marathon ===
Year	Male athlete	Time (h:m:s)	Female athlete	Time (h:m:s)	Rf.
2007	Bernard Mutai (KEN)	2:21:11	Okasna Khokhlova (RUS)	3:03:09	
2008	Bernard Mutai (KEN)	2:18:01	Li Shiao-yu (TWN)	3:06:49	
2009	Bernard Mutai (KEN)	2:22:01	Tatyana Perepelkina (RUS)	2:55:41	
2010	Karanja Elijah Muturi (KEN)	2:16:39	Carolyne Chemutai Komen (KEN)	2:49:06	
2011	Karanja Elijah Muturi (KEN)	2:31:37	Carolyne Chemutai Komen (KEN)	2:50:36	
2012	Richard Mutua Mutisya (KEN)	2:35:08	Li Shiao-yu (TWN)	3:00:25	
2013					
2014	Chirchir Jackson Kiprotich (KEN)	2:25:49	Hsieh Chien-ho (TWN)	2:48:27	
2015	John Kiprop Samoei (KEN)		Immaculate Chemutai (UGA)		
2016	Bernard Mwendia Muthoni (KEN)	2:22:42	Cecilia Wayua Michael (KEN)	2:48:16	
2017	Mbuni Edward Omwoyo (KEN)	2:26:32	Gathingi Hannah Wadera (KEN)	2:50:22	
2018	Bernard Mwendia Muthoni (KEN)				
2019	David Kipkoech Kisang (KEN)	2:26:45	Monica Watetu Ndiritu (KEN)	2:43:49	

=== Half marathon ===
Year	Male athlete	Time (h:m:s)	Female athlete	Time (h:m:s)	Rf.
2007					
2008					
2009					
2010					
2011					
2012	Wang Chiu-chun (TWN)	1:13:43	Chen Shu-hua (TWN)	1:22:57	
2013					
2014					
2015					
2016			You Ya-jyun (TWN)		
2017					
2018					
2019	Wu Jui-en (TWN)	1:12:58	Su Feng-ting (TWN)	1:20:40	
2020	Tan Huong-leong (MAS)	1:09:53	Hsieh Chien-ho (TWN)	1:18:05	
2021	**Canceled due to the COVID-19 pandemic**				
2022	Chou Ting-yin (TWN)	1:09:01	Su Feng-ting (TWN)	1:19:46	
2023	Stephen Kimemia Njogu (KEN)	1:07:04	Chang Chih-hsuan (TWN)	1:19:35	

=== Quarter marathon ===
Year	Male athlete	Time (h:m:s)	Female athlete	Time (h:m:s)	Rf.
2019					
2020	Gu Chien-hung (TWN)	00:32:49	You Ya-jyun (TWN)	00:36:25	
2021	**Canceled due to the COVID-19 pandemic**				
2022	Li Lee-chun (TWN)	00:30:46	You Ya-jyun (TWN)	00:35:55	
2023	Tsai Yung-hsu (TWN)		Tung Chia-chi (TWN)		

== See also ==
- List of sporting events in Taiwan
