= 2016 IIHF World U18 Championship Division III =

2016 IIHF U18 World Championship Division IIII

Tournament details
- Host countries: Bulgaria; South Africa
- Venues: 2 (in 2 host cities)
- Dates: 14–20 March 2016; 14–19 February 2016
- Teams: 12

The 2016 IIHF World U18 Championship Division III Group A and 2016 IIHF World U18 Championship Division III Group B were a pair of international under-18 men's ice hockey tournaments run by the International Ice Hockey Federation. The Group A and Group B tournaments made up the sixth and seventh level of competition at the 2016 IIHF World U18 Championships. The Group A tournament took place between 14 March and 20 March 2016 in Sofia, Bulgaria. The tournament was won by Australia who gained promotion back to Division II Group B for 2017 while Mexico finished last and was relegated to Division III Group B for 2017. The Group B tournament took place from 14 February to 19 February 2016 in Cape Town, South Africa. New Zealand won the tournament and gained promotion to Division III Group A for 2017.

== Division III Group A tournament ==
2016 IIHF World U18 Championship Division III Group A
Tournament details
- Host country: Bulgaria
- Venue: 1 (in 1 host city)
- Dates: 14–20 March 2016
- Teams: 6

Tournament statistics
- Games played: 15
- Goals scored: 109 (7.27 per game)
- Attendance: 11,180 (745 per game)
- Scoring leader: (Turkey) Ferhat Bakal

The Division III Group A tournament began on 14 March 2016 in Sofia, Bulgaria at the Winter Sports Palace. Bulgaria, Chinese Taipei, Israel and Mexico returned to compete in Division III Group A after missing promotion in the 2015 tournament. Turkey gained promotion to Division III Group A after finishing first in last years Division III Group B tournament and Australia was relegated from Division II Group B after finishing last in the 2015 tournament.

Australia won the tournament after winning four of their five games, finishing first in the group standings and gained promotion back to Division II Group B for the 2017 IIHF World U18 Championships. Turkey finished in second place, one point behind Australia, and Bulgaria in third place. Mexico finished the tournament in last place after losing all five of their games and was relegated to Division III Group B for 2017. Turkey's Ferhat Bakal finished as the top scorer of the tournament with 14 points and Tolga Bozaci led the tournament in goaltending with a save percentage of 91.95. Bakal was also named the best forward by the IIHF directorate. Raz Werner of Israel was named the best goaltender of the tournament and Bulgaria's Atanas Genkov was named best defenceman.

=== Participants ===
Team	Qualification
Australia	placed 6th in 2015 Division II B and were relegated
Mexico	placed 2nd in 2015 Division III A
Bulgaria	hosts; placed 3rd in 2015 Division III A
Chinese Taipei	placed 4th in 2015 Division III A
Israel	placed 5th in 2015 Division III A
Turkey	placed 1st in 2015 Division III B and were promoted

=== Standings ===
Pos	Team	Pld	W	OTW	OTL	L	GF	GA	GD	Pts	Promotion or relegation
1	Australia	5	4	0	0	1	25	22	+3	12	Promoted to the 2017 Division II B
2	Turkey	5	3	1	0	1	22	13	+9	11	
3	Bulgaria	5	3	0	0	2	20	13	+7	9	
4	Israel	5	2	1	0	2	15	15	0	8	
5	Chinese Taipei	5	1	0	2	2	17	26	−9	5	
6	Mexico	5	0	0	0	5	10	20	−10	0	Relegated to the 2017 Division III B

Source: IIHF

=== Fixtures ===
All times are local. (EET – UTC+2)

14 March 2016; 13:00	Mexico	1–3 (0–0, 1–2, 0–1)	Israel	Winter Sports Palace; Attendance: 258

Game reference
6 min	Penalties	12 min
28	Shots	21

14 March 2016; 16:30	Turkey	5 – 4 OT (4–1, 0–1, 0–2, 1–0)	Chinese Taipei	Winter Sports Palace; Attendance: 268

Game reference
8 min	Penalties	18 min
37	Shots	37

14 March 2016; 20:00	Bulgaria	3–4 (1–2, 1–1, 1–1)	Australia	Winter Sports Palace; Attendance: 1,150

Game reference
12 min	Penalties	12 min
33	Shots	32

15 March 2016; 13:00	Israel	1–4 (0–1, 0–2, 1–1)	Turkey	Winter Sports Palace; Attendance: 125

Game reference
18 min	Penalties	12 min
26	Shots	40

15 March 2016; 16:30	Australia	6–3 (1–1, 1–2, 4–0)	Chinese Taipei	Winter Sports Palace; Attendance: 369

Game reference
6 min	Penalties	4 min
36	Shots	18

15 March 2016; 20:00	Mexico	2–4 (0–1, 1–0, 1–3)	Bulgaria	Winter Sports Palace; Attendance: 1,850

Game reference
6 min	Penalties	16 min
31	Shots	22

17 March 2016; 13:00	Mexico	1–4 (0–2, 0–0, 1–2)	Turkey	Winter Sports Palace; Attendance: 100

Game reference
2 min	Penalties	10 min
19	Shots	26

17 March 2016; 16:30	Australia	4–3 (2–1, 0–0, 2–2)	Israel	Winter Sports Palace; Attendance: 365

Game reference
29 min	Penalties	6 min
35	Shots	27

17 March 2016; 20:00	Bulgaria	9–3 (4–0, 3–2, 2–1)	Chinese Taipei	Winter Sports Palace; Attendance: 1,890

Game reference
26 min	Penalties	8 min
36	Shots	22

18 March 2016; 13:00	Turkey	9–6 (4–0, 2–4, 3–2)	Australia	Winter Sports Palace; Attendance: 230

Game reference
8 min	Penalties	6 min
46	Shots	39

18 March 2016; 16:30	Chinese Taipei	4–2 (1–2, 1–0, 2–0)	Mexico	Winter Sports Palace; Attendance: 190

Game reference
8 min	Penalties	12 min
23	Shots	24

18 March 2016; 20:00	Israel	4–3 (3–3, 1–0, 0–0)	Bulgaria	Winter Sports Palace; Attendance: 1,800

Game reference
12 min	Penalties	8 min
22	Shots	32

20 March 2016; 13:00	Chinese Taipei	3 – 4 SO (0–0, 1–2, 2–1, 0–0, 0–1)	Israel	Winter Sports Palace; Attendance: 140

Game reference
10 min	Penalties	4 min
28	Shots	40

20 March 2016; 16:30	Bulgaria	1–0 (0–0, 1–0, 0–0)	Turkey	Winter Sports Palace; Attendance: 1,995

Game reference
33 min	Penalties	6 min
30	Shots	22

20 March 2016; 20:00	Australia	5–4 (0–1, 1–1, 4–2)	Mexico	Winter Sports Palace; Attendance: 450

Game reference
6 min	Penalties	4 min
25	Shots	19

=== Scoring leaders ===
List shows the top ten skaters sorted by points, then goals.

Player	GP	G	A	Pts	+/-	PIM	POS
(Turkey) Ferhat Bakal	5	9	5	14	+11	2	F
(Australia) Ellesse Carini	5	6	7	13	+7	4	F
(Chinese Taipei) Wei Chiang	5	4	7	11	−2	0	F
(Australia) Thomas Steven	5	6	4	10	+4	2	F
(Australia) Liam Manwarring	5	5	5	10	+6	29	F
(Mexico) Jorge Perez	5	7	2	9	−3	4	F
(Bulgaria) Veselin Dikov	5	5	4	9	+2	43	F
(Israel) Tom Ignatovich	5	4	5	9	+6	8	F
(Turkey) Hakan Salt	5	4	5	9	+10	2	F
(Israel) Mark Revniaga	5	4	4	8	+3	2	F

=== Leading goaltenders ===
Only the top five goaltenders, based on save percentage, who have played at least 40% of their team's minutes are included in this list.

Player	MIP	SOG	GA	GAA	SVS%	SO
(Turkey) Tolga Bozaci	300:11	149	12	2.40	91.95	0
(Israel) Raz Werner	304:15	162	14	2.76	91.36	0
(Bulgaria) Aleksandar Tomov	295:32	129	13	2.64	89.92	1
(Chinese Taipei) Sheng-Chun Huang	248:06	136	16	3.87	88.24	0
(Mexico) Leonardo Chavez	119:08	47	6	3.02	87.23	0

== Division III Group B tournament ==
2016 IIHF World U18 Championship Division III Group B
Tournament details
- Host country: South Africa
- Venue: 1 (in 1 host city)
- Dates: 14–19 February 2016
- Teams: 3

Tournament statistics
- Games played: 6
- Goals scored: 53 (8.83 per game)
- Attendance: 1,751 (292 per game)
- Scoring leader: (New Zealand) Benjamin Harford

The Division III Group B tournament began on 14 February 2016 in Cape Town, South Africa at the Ice Station. Hong Kong and New Zealand returned to compete in Division III Group B after missing promotion in the 2015 tournament. South Africa entered the competition after being relegated from Division III Group A in 2015.

New Zealand won the tournament after winning all four of their games, finishing first in the group standings and gained promotion to Division III Group A for the 2017 IIHF World U18 Championships. South Africa and Hong Kong both completed the tournament with three points each, with South Africa taking second place with a better goal difference. New Zealand's Benjamin Harford finished as the top scorer of the tournament with eleven points and James Moore led the tournament in goaltending with a save percentage of 92.98. Harford was also named the best forward of the tournament and Moore best goaltender by the IIHF directorate. Thomas Pugh of New Zealand was named best defenceman.

=== Participants ===
Team	Qualification
South Africa	hosts; placed 6th in 2015 Division III A and were relegated
New Zealand	placed 2nd in 2015 Division III B
Hong Kong	placed 3rd in 2015 Division III B

=== Standings ===
Pos	Team	Pld	W	OTW	OTL	L	GF	GA	GD	Pts	Promotion or relegation
1	New Zealand	4	4	0	0	0	30	9	+21	12	Promoted to the 2017 Division II A
2	South Africa	4	1	0	0	3	11	19	−8	3	
3	Hong Kong	4	1	0	0	3	12	25	−13	3	

Source: IIHF

=== Fixtures ===
All times are local. (SAST – UTC+2)

14 February 2016; 20:00	Hong Kong	3–6 (1–4, 2–1, 0–1)	South Africa	Ice Station; Attendance: 400

Game reference
			Referee: (France) Laurent Garbay; Linesmen: (France) Jeremie Douchy (Hungary) Barna Kis-Király
6 min	Penalties	26 min	Referee: (France) Laurent Garbay; Linesmen: (France) Jeremie Douchy (Hungary) Barna Kis-Király
35	Shots	23	Referee: (France) Laurent Garbay; Linesmen: (France) Jeremie Douchy (Hungary) Barna Kis-Király

15 February 2016; 20:00	New Zealand	8–4 (5–1, 0–1, 3–2)	Hong Kong	Ice Station; Attendance: 126

Game reference
			Referee: (Hungary) Daniel Rencz; Linesmen: (South Africa) Jonathan Burger (France) Jeremie Douchy
62 min	Penalties	40 min	Referee: (Hungary) Daniel Rencz; Linesmen: (South Africa) Jonathan Burger (France) Jeremie Douchy
47	Shots	35	Referee: (Hungary) Daniel Rencz; Linesmen: (South Africa) Jonathan Burger (France) Jeremie Douchy

16 February 2016; 17:45	South Africa	1–6 (0–3, 1–3, 0–0)	New Zealand	Ice Station; Attendance: 253

Game reference
			Referee: (France) Laurent Garbay; Linesmen: (South Africa) Jonathan Burger (Hungary) Barna Kis-Király
45 min	Penalties	32 min	Referee: (France) Laurent Garbay; Linesmen: (South Africa) Jonathan Burger (Hungary) Barna Kis-Király
30	Shots	40	Referee: (France) Laurent Garbay; Linesmen: (South Africa) Jonathan Burger (Hungary) Barna Kis-Király

17 February 2016; 17:45	Hong Kong	3–2 (1–1, 1–1, 1–0)	South Africa	Ice Station; Attendance: 289

Game reference
			Referee: (Hungary) Daniel Rencz; Linesmen: (France) Jeremie Douchy (Hungary) Barna Kis-Király
16 min	Penalties	12 min	Referee: (Hungary) Daniel Rencz; Linesmen: (France) Jeremie Douchy (Hungary) Barna Kis-Király
31	Shots	26	Referee: (Hungary) Daniel Rencz; Linesmen: (France) Jeremie Douchy (Hungary) Barna Kis-Király

18 February 2016; 17:45	New Zealand	9–2 (3–0, 5–0, 1–2)	Hong Kong	Ice Station; Attendance: 94

Game reference
			Referee: (France) Laurent Garbay; Linesmen: (South Africa) Jonathan Burger (France) Jeremie Douchy
4 min	Penalties	6 min	Referee: (France) Laurent Garbay; Linesmen: (South Africa) Jonathan Burger (France) Jeremie Douchy
56	Shots	28	Referee: (France) Laurent Garbay; Linesmen: (South Africa) Jonathan Burger (France) Jeremie Douchy

19 February 2016; 17:45	South Africa	2–7 (0–3, 0–1, 2–3)	New Zealand	Ice Station; Attendance: 589

Game reference
			Referee: (Hungary) Daniel Rencz; Linesmen: (South Africa) Jonathan Burger (Hungary) Barna Kis-Király
35 min	Penalties	16 min	Referee: (Hungary) Daniel Rencz; Linesmen: (South Africa) Jonathan Burger (Hungary) Barna Kis-Király
29	Shots	33	Referee: (Hungary) Daniel Rencz; Linesmen: (South Africa) Jonathan Burger (Hungary) Barna Kis-Király

=== Scoring leaders ===
List shows the top ten skaters sorted by points, then goals.

Player	GP	G	A	Pts	+/-	PIM	POS
(New Zealand) Benjamin Harford	4	7	4	11	+13	24	F
(New Zealand) Shaun Brown	4	4	4	8	+12	6	F
(Hong Kong) Hing Yui Tsang	4	4	4	8	−6	18	F
(New Zealand) Logan Fraser	4	2	6	8	+3	14	F
(New Zealand) Alexander Egan	4	3	4	7	−1	12	F
(New Zealand) Mak Rawiri	4	5	1	6	+1	2	F
(New Zealand) Rom van Stolk	4	3	1	4	+5	2	F
(Hong Kong) Ho Ming Herman Lui	4	1	3	4	−9	14	F
(South Africa) Luke Vivier	4	3	0	3	0	0	F
(South Africa) Aidan Beukes	4	2	1	3	+1	6	F
(Hong Kong) Hing Wing Tsang	4	2	1	3	−8	6	F

=== Leading goaltenders ===
Only the top goaltenders, based on save percentage, who have played at least 40% of their team's minutes are included in this list.

Player	MIP	SOG	GA	GAA	SVS%	SO
(New Zealand) James Moore	120:00	57	4	2.00	92.98	0
(New Zealand) Taylor Goodall	120:00	65	5	2.50	92.31	0
(South Africa) Ryan Boyd	166:55	96	13	4.67	86.46	0
(Hong Kong) Joshua Sun Ho Ho	152:57	101	18	7.06	82.18	0
