= Yu-Chiang Hou =

Taiwanese professional golfer

Personal information
- Nickname: Vivian
- Nationality: Taiwan
- Born: c. 2000

Career
- Sport: Golf
- College: University of Arizona
- Turned professional: 2022
- Current tours: Epson Tour; Taiwan LPGA Tour
- Former tour: LPGA Tour
- Professional wins: 5

Yu-Chiang "Vivian" Hou (born c. 2000) is a Taiwanese professional golfer.

== Amateur career ==
Hou reached number one on the World Amateur Golf Ranking in 2020. She played college golf at the University of Arizona. She was the runner up at the 2021 U.S. Women's Amateur. Her sister Yu-Sang Hou was her teammate at Arizona and her caddy. She won three professional events while still an amateur.

== Professional career ==
Hou turned professional in 2022. She earned status on the LPGA Tour for the 2022 season via the LPGA Q-Series.

== Amateur wins ==
- 2014 National Middle School - Junior High Championship
- 2016 Victorian Junior Masters
- 2018 Third Selection Tournament for Asian Games National Squad

== Professional wins (5) ==
=== Taiwan LPGA Tour wins (4) ===
- 2018 TLPGA Ladies Open - Nan Pao (as an amateur)
- 2019 ICTSI Pradera Verde Ladies Classic (as an amateur)
- 2023 Wistron Ladies Open
- 2026 Kenda Tire TLPGA Open

=== China LPGA Tour wins (1) ===
- 2019 Zhangjiagang Shuangshan Challenge (as an amateur)

== Team appearances ==
Amateur

- Patsy Hankins Trophy (representing Asia/Pacific): 2018 (winners)
