= Damien Knabben =

Belgian futsal coach (1941–2006)

Damien Knabben (May 6, 1941 – April 2, 2006), born in Genk, was a Belgian futsal coach. He managed the Belgium national futsal team and the Chinese Taipei national futsal team. He was also a FIFA and UEFA futsal instructor.

== See also ==
- Damien Knabben Cup
