= 1970 Asian Judo Championships =

Judo competition

The 1970 Asian Judo Championships were held in Kaohsiung, Taiwan.

== Medal overview ==
=== Men's events ===
Event	Gold	Silver	Bronze
Lightweight (63 kg)	Takao Kawaguchi (JPN)	Yoon Gong-Hwa (KOR)	Chi (ROC)
Lightweight (63 kg)	Takao Kawaguchi (JPN)	Yoon Gong-Hwa (KOR)	Hardjasa (INA)
Middleweight (70 kg)	Toyokazu Nomura (JPN)	Kim Dae-Geun (KOR)	Geronimo Dyogi (PHI)
Middleweight (70 kg)	Toyokazu Nomura (JPN)	Kim Dae-Geun (KOR)	Huang (ROC)
Middleweight (80 kg)	Choi Kyu-Bon (KOR)	Seichi Goto (JPN)	Narzal Garcia (PHI)
Middleweight (80 kg)	Choi Kyu-Bon (KOR)	Seichi Goto (JPN)	Huang (ROC)
Middleweight (93 kg)	Tsukio Kawahara (JPN)	Hsu (ROC)	Chyung Lee-Su (KOR)
Middleweight (93 kg)	Tsukio Kawahara (JPN)	Hsu (ROC)	Fernando Garcia (PHI)
Heavyweight (+93 kg)	Kazuhiro Ninomiya (JPN)	Chyung Sam-Hyun (KOR)	Zheng (ROC)
Heavyweight (+93 kg)	Kazuhiro Ninomiya (JPN)	Chyung Sam-Hyun (KOR)	Kan (SIN)
Openweight	Motoki Nishimura (JPN)	Tsukio Kawahara (JPN)	Hsu (ROC)
Openweight	Motoki Nishimura (JPN)	Tsukio Kawahara (JPN)	Chyung Sam-Hyun (KOR)

=== Medals table ===
Rank	Nation	Gold	Silver	Bronze	Total
1	Japan	5	2	0	7
2	South Korea	1	3	2	6
3	Republic of China	0	1	5	6
4	Philippines	0	0	3	3
5	Indonesia	0	0	1	1
5	Singapore	0	0	1	1
Totals (6 entries)		6	6	12	24

== See also ==
- List of sporting events in Taiwan
