= Taiwan Women's Golf Open =

Golf tournament

Tournament information
- Location: Kaohsiung City, Taiwan
- Established: 2019
- Course: Hsin Yi Golf Club
- Par: 72
- Tours: Taiwan LPGA Tour; LPGA of Korea Tour
- Format: Stroke play
- Prize fund: $800,000
- Month played: January

Current champion
- (South Korea) Jeon Mi-jeong

Location map
- Location in Taiwan

The Taiwan Women's Golf Open is a golf tournament on the Taiwan LPGA Tour and LPGA of Korea Tour hosted in Taiwan since 2019. It is played at Hsin Yi Golf Club in Kaohsiung City.

The 72-hole stroke play tournament features a field of 108, which is cut down to 60 for the third round. It has a purse of US$800,000, the largest on the Taiwan LPGA Tour, and is sponsored by Seoul Broadcasting System.

Play at the inaugural event was suspended for a while in the morning due to poor visibility caused by fog. Thailand's Wannasiri Sirisampant made a hole-in-one on the 13th hole, and won a Hublot watch worth NT$400,000.

The event was cancelled for several years due to the COVID-19 pandemic and ongoing travel restrictions.

== Winners ==
| Year | Tour(s) (Note: KLPGA − LPGA of Korea Tour; TLPGA − Taiwan LPGA Tour.) | Winner | Country | Score | Margin of victory | Runner(s)-up | WWGR points | Ref |
Taiwan Women's Golf Open with SBS Golf
2020–2022: No tournament due to the COVID-19 pandemic
| 2019 | KLPGA · TLPGA | Jeon Mi-jeong | South Korea | 276 (−12) | 1 stroke | (South Korea) Kim Si-won (Chinese Taipei) Tsai Pei-ying | 18.5 | |

== See also ==
- LPGA Taiwan Championship
- Taiwan Ladies Open
