= Wistron Ladies Open =

Professional golf tournament in Taiwan

Coordinates: 24.880°N 121.155°E

Tournament information
- Location: Taoyuan, Taiwan
- Established: 2020
- Courses: Sunrise Golf & Country Club
- Par: 72
- Length: 6,413 yd (5,864 m)
- Tours: Ladies European Tour; Taiwan LPGA Tour
- Format: Stroke play
- Prize fund: US$1,200,000
- Month played: October

Current champion
- (South Africa) Casandra Alexander

Location map
- Location in East Asia Location in Taiwan

The Wistron Ladies Open is a professional golf tournament on the Taiwan LPGA Tour first played in 2020. It became co-sanctioned by the Ladies European Tour in 2024.

The tournament, held at Sunrise Golf and Country Club near Taoyuan, Taiwan ahead of the Hero Women's Indian Open, is one of 12 LET events in 2024 to feature a prize fund of at least $1 million.

== Winners ==
Year	Tour(s) (Note: TLPGA − Taiwan LPGA Tour; LET − Ladies European Tour.)	Winner	Country	Score	To par	Margin of victory	Runner(s)-up	Purse ($)	Ref
2026	TLPGA; LET	Casandra Alexander	South Africa	64-71-68-64=267	−21	3 strokes	(England) Hannah Screen	1,200,000	
2025	TLPGA; LET	Yani Tseng	Taiwan	63-67=130	−14	4 strokes	(New Zealand) Amelia Garvey	1,000,000	
2024	TLPGA; LET	Chiara Tamburlini	Switzerland	66-73-68-69=276	−12	4 strokes	(Taiwan) Yu-Sang Hou	1,000,000	
2023	TLPGA	Vivian Hou	Taiwan	67-73-71-66=277	–11	1 stroke	(Philippines) Bianca Pagdanganan	800,000	
2022	TLPGA	Ya-Chun Chang	Taiwan	74-71=145	+1	1 stroke	(Taiwan) Ho-yu An (Taiwan) Phoebe Yao	500,000	
2021	TLPGA	Wu Chia-yen	Taiwan	71-65-68=204	–12	5 strokes	(Taiwan) Cheng-Hsuan Shih	NT$10,000,000	
2020	TLPGA	Cheng-Hsuan Shih	Taiwan	70-71-72=213	–3	1 stroke	(Taiwan) Ssu-Chia Cheng	NT$6,000,000	

== See also ==
- Sunrise Cup World Team Championship
