= Taipei Futsal Association =

- 台北市五人制足球協會
- Abbreviation: TPFSA
- Formation: 10 February 2006
- Type: Sports club
- Website: www.tpfa-futsal.org.tw

Taipei Futsal Association (TPFSA; Chinese: 台北市五人制足球協會) was established by the Taipei City Government in Taipei, Taiwan, on 14 January 2006. Its purpose is to promote futsal activities and to make relating development plans. Its creation was spearheaded by coach Zhang Zhaolu, a futsal coach at Qingjiang Elementary School.

The group began collaborating with futsal teams in Fujian in 2006. The first futsal competitions between China and Taiwan were held in 2011.

== See also ==
- Taipei Football Association
- Damien Knabben Cup
