= Wu Chia-yen (golfer) =

Taiwanese professional golfer

Personal information
- Nationality: Chinese Taipei
- Born: 25 March 2004 (age 22) Taipei, Taiwan
- Height: 155 cm (5 ft 1 in)
- Weight: 52 kg (115 lb)

Career
- Sport: Golf
- Turned professional: 2020
- Current tours: LPGA of Japan Tour (joined 2023); Taiwan LPGA Tour (joined 2018)
- Professional wins: 12

Number of wins by tour
- LPGA of Japan Tour: 2
- Other: 10

Wu Chia-yen (吳佳晏, born 25 March 2004) is a Taiwanese professional golfer who plays on the LPGA of Japan Tour.

== Amateur career ==
In the quarter-finals of the 2017 U.S. Women's Amateur, Wu prevailed over Lauren Stephenson to win in a 30-hole match, the longest in United States Golf Association history. It broke the previous record of 28 holes set at the 1930 U.S. Amateur and 1960 U.S. Junior Amateur.

At only 13 years and four months, she became the youngest player in history to advance to the semi-finals of the U.S. Women's Amateur.

== Professional career ==
Wu turned professional in 2020 and won seven times on the Taiwan LPGA Tour before joining the LPGA of Japan Tour in 2023, where she quickly secured three victories on the tour's development circuit, the Step Up Tour. By the end of 2023, she had advanced to 152nd in the Women's World Golf Rankings, and was the second highest ranked Taiwanese player behind Chien Pei-yun.

Wu won the Daio Paper Elleair Ladies Open in 2025, her first title on the LPGA of Japan Tour.

== Amateur wins ==
- 2018 Swinging Skirts Dream Cup - Spring, International Ladies Amateur Golf Championship, Yeangder Amateur Classic Leg 2
- 2019 Yeangder Amateur Classic Leg 5
- 2020 Yeangder Amateur Classic Leg 9

== Professional wins (12) ==
=== LPGA of Japan Tour wins (2) ===
No.	Date	Tournament	Winning score	To par	Margin of victory	Runner(s)-up	Ref.
1	23 Nov 2025	Daio Paper Elleair Ladies Open	69-67-66-67=269	−15	3 strokes	(Japan) Shuri Sakuma	
2	12 Apr 2026	Fujifilm Studio Alice Ladies Open	68-68-70=206	−10	2 strokes	(Japan) Akie Iwai (Japan) Shuri Sakuma	

=== Taiwan LPGA Tour wins (7) ===
No.	Date	Tournament	Winning score	To par	Margin of victory	Runner(s)-up	Ref.
1	5 Oct 2018	Party Golfer Ladies Open (as an amateur)	67-71-71=209	−7	1 stroke	(Taiwan) Liu Yi-chen	
2	23 Jul 2020	WPG Ladies Open	67-69-68=204	−12	1 stroke	(Taiwan) Phoebe Yao	
3	27 Aug 2020	Yichen Future Open	65-70-68=203	−13	5 strokes	(Taiwan) Chen Hsuan (Taiwan) Chang Ya-chun (a)	
4	26 Sep 2021	CTBC Invitational	20 holes			(Taiwan) Jessica Peng	
5	15 Oct 2021	Wistron Ladies Open	71-65-68=204	−12	5 strokes	(Taiwan) Shih Cheng-hsuan	
6	5 Nov 2021	Party Golfers Ladies Open	67-64-70=201	−15	12 strokes	(Taiwan) Tsai Hsin-en (Taiwan) Lee Hsin	
7	23 Dec 2022	Taiwan Mobile Ladies Open	65-67-67=199	−17	5 strokes	(Taiwan) Hou Yu-sang	

=== LPGA of Japan Step Up Tour wins (3) ===
No.	Date	Tournament	Winning score	To par	Margin of victory	Runner(s)-up	Ref.
1	18 Jun 2023	Yupiteru Shizuoka Shimbun & Shizuoka Broadcasting System Ladies	70-69-67=206	−10	5 strokes	(Japan) Yuki Ichinose (Japan) Seira Oki	
2	28 Jul 2023	Castrol Ladies	68-65-68=201	−15	2 strokes	(Japan) Mitsuki Kobayashi	
3	23 Sep 2023	Chugoku Shimbun Chupea Ladies Cup	70-70-66=206	−10	2 strokes	(Japan) Riko Inoue (Japan) Rena Ishikawa	
