= Taipei Football Association =

- 台北市足球協會
- Abbreviation: TFA
- Headquarters: Taipei, Taiwan
- Website: www.tfa-soccer.org.tw

The Taipei Football Association (TFA; Chinese: 台北市足球協會; pinyin: Táiběi Shì Zúqiú Xiéhuì) is the governing body of football in Taipei, Taiwan.

== Activities ==
- Summer and winter futsal tournaments
- Spring and autumn football tournaments for primary- and junior-high-school students
- Football summer and winter camps

== See also ==
- Chinese Taipei Football Association
- Taipei Futsal Association
