= 2009 World Junior Ice Hockey Championships rosters =

== Top Division ==
=== Group A ===
==== Canada ====
- Head coach: (Canada) Pat Quinn

Pos.	No.	Player	Team	NHL Rights
GK	31	Chet Pickard	(United States) Tri-City Americans	Nashville Predators
GK	30	Dustin Tokarski	(United States) Spokane Chiefs	Tampa Bay Lightning
D	32	Keith Aulie	(Canada) Brandon Wheat Kings	Calgary Flames
D	8	Ryan Ellis	(Canada) Windsor Spitfires
D	17	Cody Goloubef	(United States) University of Wisconsin	Columbus Blue Jackets
D	4	Thomas Hickey (C)	(United States) Seattle Thunderbirds	Los Angeles Kings
D	3	Tyler Myers	(Canada) Kelowna Rockets	Buffalo Sabres
D	10	Alex Pietrangelo	(Canada) Niagara IceDogs	St. Louis Blues
D	5	P. K. Subban	(Canada) Belleville Bulls	Montreal Canadiens
D	2	Colten Teubert	(Canada) Regina Pats	Los Angeles Kings
F	24	Jamie Benn	(Canada) Kelowna Rockets	Dallas Stars
F	11	Zach Boychuk	(Canada) Lethbridge Hurricanes	Carolina Hurricanes
F	28	Patrice Cormier	(Canada) Rimouski Océanic	New Jersey Devils
F	15	Stefan Della Rovere	(Canada) Barrie Colts	Washington Capitals
F	25	Christopher DiDomenico	(Canada) Saint John Sea Dogs	Toronto Maple Leafs
F	14	Jordan Eberle	(Canada) Regina Pats	Edmonton Oilers
F	22	Tyler Ennis	(Canada) Medicine Hat Tigers	Buffalo Sabres
F	7	Angelo Esposito	(Canada) Le Club de Hockey Junior de Montréal	Atlanta Thrashers
F	18	Cody Hodgson	(Canada) Brampton Battalion	Vancouver Canucks
F	29	Evander Kane	(Canada) Vancouver Giants
F	12	Brett Sonne	(Canada) Calgary Hitmen	St. Louis Blues
F	19	John Tavares	(Canada) Oshawa Generals

==== Czech Republic ====
- Head coach: (Czech Republic) Marek Sýkora

Pos.	No.	Player	Team	NHL Rights
GK	1	Dominik Furch	(Czech Republic) HC Slavia Praha
GK	2	Tomáš Vosvrda	(Czech Republic) HC Vítkovice
D	5	Milan Dóczy	(Canada) Owen Sound Attack
D	3	Radko Gudas	(Czech Republic) HC Berounští Medvědi
D	19	Michal Jordán	(United States) Plymouth Whalers	Carolina Hurricanes
D	15	Tomáš Knotek	(Canada) Halifax Mooseheads
D	23	Tomáš Kundrátek	(Canada) Medicine Hat Tigers	New York Rangers
D	6	Martin Parýzek	(Canada) Ottawa 67s
D	4	Jan Piskáček	(Canada) Cape Breton Screaming Eagles
D	7	David Stich	(Canada) Saint John Sea Dogs
F	21	Rudolf Červený	(Canada) Regina Pats
F	24	Jan Eberle	(Czech Republic) HC Berounští Medvědi
F	9	Jan Káňa	(Czech Republic) HC Vítkovice
F	18	Tomáš Kubalík	(Czech Republic) HC Plzeň	Columbus Blue Jackets
F	16	Štěpan Novotný	(Canada) Kelowna Rockets
F	11	Zdeněk Okal	(Canada) Medicine Hat Tigers
F	10	Ondřej Roman	(Czech Republic) HC Vítkovice	Dallas Stars
F	17	Vladimír Růžička	(Czech Republic) HC Slavia Praha	Phoenix Coyotes
F	27	Petr Strapáč	(Czech Republic) HC Vítkovice
F	20	Roman Szturc	(Czech Republic) HC Vítkovice
F	22	Radim Valchár	(United States) Portland Winter Hawks
F	28	Tomáš Vincour	(Canada) Edmonton Oil Kings

==== Germany ====
- Head coach: (Germany) Ernst Höfner

Pos.	No.	Player	Team	NHL Rights
GK	30	Philipp Grubauer	(Canada) Belleville Bulls
GK	1	Timo Pielmeier	(Canada) Shawinigan Cataractes	San Jose Sharks
D	7	Sinan Akdag	(Germany) Krefeld Pinguine
D	29	Dominik Bielke	(Germany) Eisbären Berlin
D	20	Benedikt Brückner	(Germany) Heilbronner Falken
D	27	Florian Müller	(Germany) EV Landshut
D	13	Marko Nowak	(Germany) DEG Metro Stars
D	10	Denis Reul	(United States) Lewiston Maineiacs	Boston Bruins
D	4	Tim Schüle	(Germany) DEG Metro Stars
D	12	Armin Wurm	(Germany) EV Füssen
F	23	Gerrit Fauser	(Canada) Gatineau Olympiques
F	5	Simon Fischhaber	(Canada) Sault Ste. Marie Greyhounds
F	9	Jerome Flaake	(Germany) Kölner Haie	Toronto Maple Leafs
F	26	Maximilian Forster	(Germany) EV Landshut
F	6	André Huebscher	(Germany) Krefeld Pinguine
F	28	Conor Morrison	(Canada) Salmon Arm Silverbacks
F	14	Alexander Oblinger	(Germany) Eisbären Berlin
F	19	Patrick Pohl	(Germany) Eisbären Berlin
F	22	Toni Ritter	(Canada) Le Club de Hockey Junior de Montréal
F	25	Steven Rupprich	(Germany) Iserlohn Roosters
F	24	Daniel Weiß	(Germany) Eisbären Berlin
F	11	David Wolf	(Germany) ETC Crimmitschau

==== Kazakhstan ====
- Head coach: (Russia) Oleg Bolyakin

Pos.	No.	Player	Team
GK	1	Maxim Gryaznov	(Kazakhstan) Sary Arka Karaganda
GK	20	Andrei Yankov	(Kazakhstan) Kaztsink-Torpedo Ust-Kamenogorsk
D	14	Evgeny Bolyakin	(Russia) Amur Khabarovsk
D	12	Viktor Ivashin	(Kazakhstan) Kaztsink-Torpedo Ust-Kamenogorsk
D	5	Andrei Korovkin	(Kazakhstan) Kaztsink-Torpedo Ust-Kamenogorsk
D	22	Leonid Metalnikov	(Kazakhstan) Kaztsink-Torpedo Ust-Kamenogorsk
D	19	Igor Netessov	(Russia) Yantar Seversk
D	7	Nikolay Safonov	(Kazakhstan) Gornyak Rudny
D	8	Vitaliy Svistunov	(Kazakhstan) Kaztsink-Torpedo Ust-Kamenogorsk
D	4	Dmitry Tikhonov	(Kazakhstan) Sary Arka Karaganda
F	3	Igor Denissenko	(Kazakhstan) Kaztsink-Torpedo Ust-Kamenogorsk
F	17	Vyacheslav Fedossenko	(Kazakhstan) Kaztsink-Torpedo Ust-Kamenogorsk
F	10	Nikita Ivanov	(Russia) Krylia Sovetov Moscow
F	13	Alexander Kaznacheyev	(Kazakhstan) Kaztsink-Torpedo Ust-Kamenogorsk
F	11	Mikhail Lazorenko	(Kazakhstan) Kaztsink-Torpedo Ust-Kamenogorsk
F	18	Eduard Mazula	(Kazakhstan) Kaztsink-Torpedo Ust-Kamenogorsk
F	9	Alexandr Nurek	(Kazakhstan) Kaztsink-Torpedo Ust-Kamenogorsk
F	27	Oleg Onichshenko	(Kazakhstan) Kaztsink-Torpedo Ust-Kamenogorsk
F	26	Konstantin Savenkov	(Kazakhstan) Kaztsink-Torpedo Ust-Kamenogorsk
F	21	Yakov Vorobyov	(Kazakhstan) Kaztsink-Torpedo Ust-Kamenogorsk

==== United States ====
- Head coach: (United States) Ron Rolston

Position	Jersey number	Name	Height (cm)	Weight (kg)	Birthdate	Birthplace	2008-09 team	NHL rights, if any
G	30	Thomas McCollum	188	93	7 December 1989	(New York (state)) Sanborn, New York	(Canada) Guelph Storm	(United States) Detroit Red Wings
G	1	Josh Unice	183	79	24 June 1989	Holland, Ohio	(Canada) Kitchener Rangers	(United States) Chicago Blackhawks
D	24	Jonathon Blum	185	84	30 January 1989	Rancho Santa Margarita, California	(Canada) Vancouver Giants	(United States) Nashville Predators
D	28	Ian Cole	185	99	21 February 1989	Ann Arbor, Michigan	(United States) University of Notre Dame	(United States) St. Louis Blues
D	4	Cade Fairchild	178	84	15 January 1989	Duluth, Minnesota	(United States) University of Minnesota	(United States) St. Louis Blues
D	20	Blake Kessel	188	92	13 April 1989	Madison, Wisconsin	(United States) University of New Hampshire	(United States) New York Islanders
D	17	Ryan McDonagh	185	94	13 June 1989	Arden Hills, Minnesota	(United States) University of Wisconsin-Madison	(United States) New York Rangers
D	5	Teddy Ruth	183	93	14 February 1989	Naperville, Illinois	(United States) University of Notre Dame	(United States) Columbus Blue Jackets
D	8	Kevin Shattenkirk	180	87	29 January 1989	(New York (state)) New Rochelle, New York	(United States) Boston University	(United States) Colorado Avalanche
F	27	Drayson Bowman	185	88	8 March 1989	Littleton, Colorado	(United States) Spokane Chiefs	(United States) Carolina Hurricanes
F	12	Jimmy Hayes	191	93	21 November 1989	Dorchester, Boston, Massachusetts	(United States) Boston College	(Canada) Toronto Maple Leafs
F	11	Mike Hoeffel	191	88	9 April 1989	North Oaks, Minnesota	(United States) University of Minnesota	(United States) New Jersey Devils
F	10	Tyler Johnson	175	79	29 July 1990	(Washington (state)) Spokane, Washington	(United States) Spokane Chiefs	None
F	18	Danny Kristo	180	82	18 June 1990	Eden Prairie, Minnesota	(United States) Omaha Lancers	(Canada) Montreal Canadiens
F	15	Jim O'Brien	188	86	29 January 1989	Maplewood, Minnesota	(United States) Seattle Thunderbirds	(Canada) Ottawa Senators
F	7	Aaron Palushaj	183	84	7 September 1989	Northville, Michigan	(United States) University of Michigan	(United States) St. Louis Blues
F	9	Matt Rust	178	88	23 March 1989	Bloomfield Hills, Michigan	(United States) University of Michigan	(United States) Florida Panthers
F	19	Jordan Schroeder	175	83	29 September 1990	Prior Lake, Minnesota	(United States) University of Minnesota	None
F	25	Eric Tangradi	191	97	10 February 1989	Philadelphia, Pennsylvania	(Canada) Belleville Bulls	(United States) Anaheim Ducks
F	21	James van Riemsdyk	191	95	4 May 1989	Middletown, New Jersey	(United States) University of New Hampshire	(United States) Philadelphia Flyers
F	14	Mitch Wahl	183	86	22 January 1990	Seal Beach, California	(United States) Spokane Chiefs	(Canada) Calgary Flames
F	33	Colin Wilson	185	97	20 October 1989	Greenwich, Connecticut	(United States) Boston University	(United States) Nashville Predators

=== Group B ===
==== Finland ====
- Head coach: (Finland) Jukka Rautakorpi

Pos.	No.	Player	Team	NHL Rights
GK		Juha Metsola	(Canada) Lethbridge Hurricanes
GK		Harri Säteri	(Finland) Tappara	San Jose Sharks
D		Ari Gröndahl	(Finland) Blues
D		Joonas Järvinen	(Finland) TPS
D		Jesse Jyrkkiö	(Finland) Ässät
D		Tommi Kivistö	(Canada) Red Deer Rebels
D		Ilari Melart	(Finland) HIFK
D		Jyri Niemi	(Canada) Saskatoon Blades	New York Islanders
D		Kristian Näkyvä	(Finland) Blues
D		Veli-Matti Vittasmäki	(Finland) TPS
F		Mikael Granlund	(Finland) Kärpät
F		Teemu Hartikainen	(Finland) KalPa	Edmonton Oilers
F		Jani-Petteri Helenius	(Finland) Jokerit
F		Nestori Lähde	(Finland) Tappara
F		Sami Lähteenmäki	(Finland) LeKi
F		Jani Lajunen	(Finland) Blues	Nashville Predators
F		Niclas Lucenius	(Finland) Tappara	Atlanta Thrashers
F		Joonas Nättinen	(Finland) Blues
F		Eetu Pöysti	(Finland) HIFK
F		Toni Rajala	(Finland) Ilves
F		Joonas Rask	(Finland) Ilves
F		Antti Roppo	(Finland) LeKi
F		Tomi Sallinen	(Finland) Blues

==== Latvia ====
- Head coach: (Latvia) Andrejs Maticins

Pos.	No.	Player	Team
GK	1	Nauris Enkuzens	(Latvia) SK LSPA/Riga
GK	30	Raimonds Ermics	(Latvia) HK Prizma Riga
D	29	Ralfs Freibergs	(Latvia) HK Prizma Riga
D	6	Martinš Gipters	(Latvia) SK LSPA/Riga
D	26	Kriss Grundmanis	(Latvia) HK Riga 2000
D	3	Alberts Ilisko	(Sweden) Nynäshamns IF
D	4	Gvido Kauss	(Latvia) HK Riga 2000
D	20	Kristaps Kuplais	(Latvia) SK LSPA/Riga
D	5	Aldis Pizans	Latvia ASK/Ogre
D	8	Janis Smits	(Sweden) Nynäshamns IF
F	25	Lauris Bajaruns	(Latvia) Latgale Daugavpils
F	24	Roberts Bukarts	(Russia) Krylya Sovetov Moscow
F	21	Ronald Cinks	(Latvia) HK Riga 2000
F	15	Koba Jass	(Latvia) ASK/Ogre
F	14	Roberts Jekimovs	(Sweden) Brynäs IF
F	27	Edgars Lipsbergs	(United States) Topeka Roadrunners
F	24	Artjoms Ogorodnikovs	(Latvia) ASK/Ogre
F	16	Janis Ozolins	(Latvia) HK Riga 2000
F	22	Vitalijs Pavlovs	(Latvia) DHK Latgale
F	13	Gunars Skvorcovs	(Latvia) HK Liepājas Metalurgs
F	19	Janis Straupe	(Latvia) HK Riga 2000
F	28	Edgars Ulescenko	(Latvia) ASK/Ogre

==== Russia ====
- Head coach: (Russia) Sergei Nemchinov

Pos.	No.	Player	Team	NHL Rights
GK	20	Danila Alistratov	(Russia) Traktor Chelyabinsk
GK	1	Vadim Zhelobnyuk	(Russia) Dynamo Moscow
D	27	Maxim Chudinov	(Russia) Severstal Cherepovets
D	2	Igor Golovkov	(Russia) Dynamo Moscow
D	5	Maxim Goncharov	(Russia) CSKA Moscow	Phoenix Coyotes
D	14	Dinar Khafizullin	(Russia) Neftyanik Almetievsk
D	3	Dmitry Kulikov	(Canada) Drummondville Voltigeurs
D	6	Mikhail Pashnin	(Russia) Mechel Chelyabinsk
D	8	Vasily Tokranov	(Russia) Neftyanik Aletievsk
D	24	Vyacheslav Voynov	(United States) Manchester Monarchs	Los Angeles Kings
F	16	Sergei Andronov	(Russia) Lada Tolyatti
F	10	Pavel Chernov	(Russia) Atlant Moscow
F	26	Evgeny Dadonov	(Russia) Traktor Chelyabinsk	Florida Panthers
F	28	Nikita Filatov	(United States) Syracuse Crunch	Columbus Blue Jackets
F	15	Evgeni Grachev	(Canada) Brampton Battalion	New York Rangers
F	9	Dmitry Klopov	(Russia) Torpedo Nizhny Novgorod
F	21	Nikita Klyukin	(Russia) Lokomotiv Yaroslavl
F	13	Alexander Komaristy	(Russia) Yuzhni Ural Orsk
F	23	Sergey Korostin	(Canada) Peterborough Petes	Dallas Stars
F	18	Dmitry Kugryshev	(Canada) Quebec Remparts	Washington Capitals
F	31	Kirill Petrov	(Russia) Ak Bars Kazan	New York Islanders
F	29	Alexei Potapov	(Russia) Torpedo Nizhny Novgorod

==== Slovakia ====
- Head coach: (Slovakia) Stefan Mikes

Pos.	No.	Player	Team	NHL Rights
GK	2	Jaroslav Janus	(United States) Erie Otters
GK	30	Zdenko Kotvan	(Slovakia) Orange 20 Puchov
D	19	Ján Brejčák	(Slovakia) Orange 20 Puchov
D	7	Marek Ďaloga	(Slovakia) Orange 20 Puchov
D	25	Radek Deyl	(Slovakia) Orange 20 Puchov
D	6	Michal Šiška	(Canada) Kamloops Blazers
D	3	Martin Štajnoch	(Slovakia) Orange 20 Puchov
D	8	Juraj Valach	(Slovakia) HKm Zvolen
D	16	Matúš Vizváry	(Slovakia) Orange 20 Puchov
F	12	Adam Bezák	(Slovakia) Orange 20 Puchov
F	17	Marek Hrivík	(Slovakia) Orange 20 Puchov
F	9	Peter Kopecký	(Slovakia) Orange 20 Puchov
F	22	Milan Kytnár	(Canada) Saskatoon Blades	Edmonton Oilers
F	29	Marek Mertel	(Slovakia) Orange 20 Puchov
F	18	Jozef Molnár	(Slovakia) Orange 20 Puchov
F	28	Richard Pánik	(Czech Republic) HC Oceláři Třinec
F	15	Ondrej Rusnák	(Slovakia) Orange 20 Puchov
F	14	Tomáš Tatar	(Slovakia) HKm Zvolen
F	21	Radoslav Tybor	(Slovakia) Orange 20 Puchov
F	10	Martin Uhnák	(Slovakia) Orange 20 Puchov
F	23	Marek Viedenský	(Canada) Prince George Cougars
F	27	Tomáš Vyletelka	(Slovakia) Orange 20 Puchov

==== Sweden ====
- Head coach: (Sweden) Pär Mårts

Pos.	No.	Player	Team	NHL Rights
GK	25	Jacob Markström	(Sweden) Brynäs IF	Florida Panthers
GK	30	Mark Owuya	(Sweden) Djurgårdens IF
D	8	Viktor Ekbom	(Sweden) Linköpings HC
D	3	Sebastian Erixon	(Sweden) Timrå IK
D	16	Tim Erixon	(Sweden) Skellefteå AIK
D	28	Carl Gustafsson	(Sweden) Djurgårdens IF
D	4	Victor Hedman	(Sweden) Modo Hockey
D	5	Erik Karlsson	(Sweden) Frölunda HC	Ottawa Senators
D	7	David Rundblad	(Sweden) Skellefteå AIK
D	6	Nichlas Torp	(Sweden) HV71	Montreal Canadiens
F	18	Joakim Andersson	(Sweden) Frölunda HC	Detroit Red Wings
F	22	Mikael Backlund	(Sweden) VIK Västerås HK	Calgary Flames
F	29	Simon Hjalmarsson	(Sweden) Borås HC	St. Louis Blues
F	11	Marcus Johansson	(Sweden) Färjestad BK
F	26	Jacob Josefson	(Sweden) Djurgårdens IF
F	23	Nicklas Lasu	(Sweden) Frölunda HC	Atlanta Thrashers
F	9	Oscar Möller	(United States) Los Angeles Kings	Los Angeles Kings
F	17	Anton Persson	(Sweden) Brynäs IF
F	20	André Petersson	(Sweden) HV71	Ottawa Senators
F	21	Magnus Pääjärvi-Svensson	(Sweden) Timrå IK
F	10	Mattias Tedenby	(Sweden) HV71	New Jersey Devils
F	24	David Ullström	(Sweden) HV71	New York Islanders

== NHL prospects by team ==
There were 72 NHL-drafted prospects playing in the tournament. In addition, six of the top-ten ranked players in the 2009 draft participated. The Latvian and Kazakh teams did not have any NHL prospects on their rosters.

Team	Prospects
St. Louis Blues	6
Columbus Blue Jackets	4
Los Angeles Kings	4
Montreal Canadiens	4
Nashville Predators	4
New York Islanders	4
Atlanta Thrashers	3
Calgary Flames	3
Carolina Hurricanes	3
Dallas Stars	3
Edmonton Oilers	3
Florida Panthers	3
New Jersey Devils	3
Ottawa Senators	3
Toronto Maple Leafs	3
Buffalo Sabres	2
Detroit Red Wings	2
New York Rangers	2
Phoenix Coyotes	2
San Jose Sharks	2
Washington Capitals	2
Anaheim Ducks	1
Boston Bruins	1
Chicago Blackhawks	1
Colorado Avalanche	1
Philadelphia Flyers	1
Tampa Bay Lightning	1
Vancouver Canucks	1
Minnesota Wild	0
Pittsburgh Penguins	0

== See also ==
- 2009 World Junior Ice Hockey Championships
- 2009 World Junior Ice Hockey Championships - Division I
- 2009 World Junior Ice Hockey Championships - Division II
