= 2009 World Junior Ice Hockey Championships =

2009 edition of the World Junior Ice Hockey Championships

2009 IIHF World U20 Championship

Tournament details
- Host country: Canada
- City: Ottawa
- Venue(s): Scotiabank Place and Ottawa Civic Centre (in 1 host city)
- Dates: December 26, 2008 – January 5, 2009
- Teams: 10

Final positions
- Champions: Canada (15th title)
- Runners-up: Sweden
- Third place: Russia
- Fourth place: Slovakia

Tournament statistics
- Games played: 31
- Goals scored: 241 (7.77 per game)
- Attendance: 453,282 (14,622 per game)
- Scoring leader: (Canada) Cody Hodgson (16 points)

Awards
- MVP: (Canada) John Tavares

The 2009 World Junior Ice Hockey Championships (2009 WJHC) was the 33rd edition of the Ice Hockey World Junior Championship and was played in Ottawa, Ontario, Canada, between December 26, 2008, and January 5, 2009. Games were held at the Ottawa Civic Centre and Scotiabank Place. The tournament set a record for WJC attendance at 453,282. Canada won the gold medal for a record-tying fifth consecutive time. No country would win back-to-back gold until the 2023 World Junior Ice Hockey Championships when Canada won the 2022 and 2023 tournaments respectively.

== Bid process ==
Five potential bid groups formally submitted their bids before the March 31, 2006, deadline and made their final presentations to the selection committee in Calgary on April 18, 2006:

- Joint bid from Calgary and Edmonton, Alberta;
- Montreal, Quebec;
- Ottawa, Ontario;
- Toronto, Ontario; and
- Saskatoon and Regina, Saskatchewan

On May 3, 2006, Hockey Canada and the Canadian Hockey League announced that Ottawa was chosen to host the 2009 tournament.

== Venues ==
Scotiabank Place Capacity: 19,153	Ottawa Civic Centre Capacity: 9,862
Canada – Ottawa	Canada – Ottawa

== Top Division ==
=== Preliminary round ===
==== Group A ====
Pos	Team	Pld	W	OTW	OTL	L	GF	GA	GD	Pts	Qualification
1	Canada	4	4	0	0	0	35	6	+29	12	Semifinals
2	United States	4	3	0	0	1	28	12	+16	9	Quarterfinals
3	Czech Republic	4	2	0	0	2	20	14	+6	6	Quarterfinals
4	Germany	4	1	0	0	3	12	19	−7	3	Relegation round
5	Kazakhstan	4	0	0	0	4	2	46	−44	0	Relegation round

Source: IIHF

Results

All times are local (Eastern Time Zone – UTC−5).

December 26, 2008; 15:30	Germany	2–8 (1–2, 0–3, 1–3)	United States	Scotiabank Place (capacity: 19,153); Attendance: 18,795 (98.1%)

Game reference

Timo Pielmeier
Philipp Grubauer
Goalies
Tom McCollum
Referees:
(Russia) Sergei Kulakov
(Slovakia) Peter Ország
Linesmen:
(Russia) Alexei Mikhel
(Slovakia) Milan Novák

	0–1	08:23 – Wilson (Shattenkirk) (PP)
Ritter (Rupprich) – 12:08	1–1
	1–2	17:51 – Bowman (O'Brien, Wahl)
	1–3	20:20 – Schroeder
	1–4	32:43 – van Riemsdyk (Wilson, Schroeder) (PP)
	1–5	34:27 – Johnson (Hoeffel, McDonagh)
	1–6	40:35 – van Riemsdyk (Wilson, Schroeder)
	1–7	46:26 – Bowman (Wahl)
Pohl (Flaake) – 53:51	2–7
	2–8	59:59 – Rust

18 min
Penalties
22 min
18
Shots
46

December 26, 2008; 19:30	Canada	8–1 (1–0, 4–0, 3–1)	Czech Republic	Scotiabank Place (capacity: 19,153); Attendance: 19,622 (102.4%)

Game reference

Dustin Tokarski
Goalies
Tomáš Vošvrda
Dominik Furch
Referees:
(Finland) Tom Laaksonen
(Finland) Jari Levonen
Linesmen:
(Sweden) Leo Takula
(Finland) Jussi Terho

Tavares (Eberle, Ellis (PP) – 19:56	1–0
Tavares (Eberle, Hodgson) (PP) – 22:09	2–0
Esposito (Tavares) – 27:08	3–0
Ellis (Boychuk, Hodgson) – 28:13	4–0
Ennis (Sonne) – 33:33	5–0
DiDomenico (Ennis, Boychuk) – 42:08	6–0
Boychuk – 48:18	7–0
Pietrangelo (Ellis, DiDomenico) – 51:51	8–0
	8–1	58:00 – Káňa (Roman)

6 min
Penalties
10 min
37
Shots
22

December 27, 2008; 15:30	Kazakhstan	0–9 (0–3, 0–4, 0–2)	Germany	Scotiabank Place (capacity: 19,153); Attendance: 18,305 (95.6%)

Game reference

Andrei Yankov
Maxim Gryaznov
Goalies
Timo Pielmeier

0–1	04:43 – Fischhaber (Fauser)
0–2	08:31 – Flaake (Weiss, Pohl)
0–3	18:45 – Huebscher (Fauser, Fischhaber)
0–4	21:52 – Weiss
0–5	22:06 – Rupprich (Ritter, Huebscher)
0–6	23:16 – Fauser (Forster, Oblinger)
0–7	27:56 – Nowak (Flaake)
0–8	51:21 – Flaake (Pohl)
0–9	57:15 – Morrison (Fischhaber, Fauser)

14 min
Penalties
10 min
17
Shots
52

December 28, 2008; 15:30	Kazakhstan	0–15 (0–4, 0–5, 0–6)	Canada	Scotiabank Place (capacity: 19,153); Attendance: 19,176 (100.1%)

Game reference

Andrei Yankov
Maxim Gryaznov
Goalies
Chet Pickard
Referees:
(Russia) Vyacheslav Bulanov
(Russia) Sergei Golikov
Linesmen:
(Germany) Thomas Gemeinhardt
(Russia) Alexei Mikhel

0–1	01:29 – Eberle (Hodgson)
0–2	08:48 – Benn (Pietrangelo) (PP)
0–3	15:53 – Benn (Tavares, Hodgson) (PP)
0–4	17:26 – Subban (Tavares)
0–5	21:36 – Hodgson (Subban)
0–6	24:11 – DiDomenico (Hickey, Ennis) (PP)
0–7	24:41 – Benn (Subban, Ennis)
0–8	32:32 – Ennis (Benn, DiDomenico) (PP)
0–9	34:52 – Tavares (Hodgson, Eberle) (PP)
0–10	40:50 – Kane (Cormier, Aulie)
0–11	51:29 – Tavares
0–12	52:15 – Hodgson (Eberle, Boychuk)
0–13	54:17 – Subban (Hodgson) (PP)
0–14	56:02 – Della Rovere (Kane, Hickey) (PP)
0–15	59:17 – Myers (Benn, Goloubef) (PP)

43 min
Penalties
2 min
11
Shots
69

December 28, 2008; 19:30	United States	4–3 (1–0, 2–1, 1–2)	Czech Republic	Scotiabank Place (capacity: 19,153); Attendance: 19,847 (103.6%)

Game reference
J. Schroeder (K. Shattenkirk, C. Wilson) (PP1) – 13:00; M. Rust (J. Blum) – 31:46; J. van Riemsdyk (K. Shattenkirk, J. Schroeder) (PP1) – 38:34; J. Schroeder (J. van Riemsdyk) – 43:43 / Goals / 25:14 – O. Roman (Z. Okál, R. Gudas); 47:02 – M. Parýzek (R. Szturc, T. Kubalík); 56:43 – (PP1) J. Káňa (T. Kundrátek, O. Roman)
14 min	Penalties	6 min
27	Shots	27

December 29, 2008; 19:30	Germany	1–5 (0–1, 1–1, 0–3)	Canada	Scotiabank Place (capacity: 19,153); Attendance: 19,326 (100.9%)

Game reference

Philipp Grubauer
Goalies
Chet Pickard

	0–1	07:21 – Boychuk (Ennis, Ellis) (PP)
	0–2	25:57 – Benn (Tavares, Ellis) (PP)
Wolf (Akdag, Morrison) (PP) – 28:40	1–2
	1–3	41:04 – Kane (Subban)
	1–4	51:25 – Tavares (Hodgson, Eberle) (PP)
	1–5	55:57 – Boychuk (DiDomenico, Pietrangelo) (PP)

37 min
Penalties
12 min
13
Shots
49

December 30, 2008; 15:30	Czech Republic	6–0 (2–0, 1–0, 3–0)	Germany	Scotiabank Place (capacity: 19,153); Attendance: 17,976 (93.9%)

Game reference
David Štich (PP1) 13:19; Zdeněk Okál (PP1) 15:23; Ondřej Roman 35:58; Tomáš Knotek 44:02; Radko Gudas (PP1) 47:56; Ondřej Roman 49:13 / Goals

December 30, 2008; 19:30	United States	12–0 (3–0, 5–0, 4–0)	Kazakhstan	Scotiabank Place (capacity: 19,153); Attendance: 18,288 (95.5%)

Game reference
Ian Cole (PP1) 16:27; Aaron Palushaj 17:07; Drayson Bowman 18:59; Colin Wilson 20:52; Colin Wilson 21:11; James van Riemsdyk (PP1) 25:34; Danny Kristo 27:12; Aaron Palushaj (PP1) 32:28; Mike Hoeffel (PP2) 50:08; Jimmy Hayes 53:59; Mitch Wahl 55:02; Matt Rust 59:55 / Goals

December 31, 2008; 15:30	Czech Republic	10–2 (6–1, 4–0, 0–1)	Kazakhstan	Scotiabank Place (capacity: 19,153); Attendance: 17,664 (92.2%)

Game reference
Tomáš Knotek 01:49; Roman Szturc 05:48; Jan Káňa 08:17; Vladimír Růžička 10:14; Vladimír Růžička 12:51; Tomáš Knotek (PP1) 15:51; Zdeněk Okál 25:55; Jan Káňa (PP1) 26:31; Jan Káňa 32:34; Jan Káňa (PP1) 36:00 / Goals / 07:17 Oleg Onichshenko; 51:08 (SH1) Konstantin Savenkov

December 31, 2008; 19:30	Canada	7–4 (3–3, 2–1, 2–0)	United States	Scotiabank Place (capacity: 19,153); Attendance: 20,223 (105.6%)

Game reference

Dustin Tokarski
Goalies
Tom McCollum

	0–1	03:49 – Shattenkirk
	0–2	07:15 – Hayes (Palushaj, Tangradi) (PP)
	0–3	12:35 – O'Brien (Shattenkirk, Bowman)
Tavares (PP) (Hodgson, Subban) – 14:55	1–3
Tavares – 15:43	2–3
Eberle (PP) (Hodgson, Subban) – 18:10	3–3
Boychuk (Hickey, DiDomenico) (PP) 20:37	4–3
	4–4	23:40 – Blum (Schroeder, Fairchild) (PP)
Hodgson (Ellis, Subban) (PP) – 26:56	5–4
Tavares (Esposito) (ENG) – 59:13	6–4
Ennis (ENG) – 59:50	7–4

20 min
Penalties
24 min
29
Shots
27

==== Group B ====
Pos	Team	Pld	W	OTW	OTL	L	GF	GA	GD	Pts	Qualification
1	Sweden	4	4	0	0	0	21	3	+18	12	Semifinals
2	Russia	4	3	0	0	1	17	9	+8	9	Quarterfinals
3	Slovakia	4	1	1	0	2	12	15	−3	5	Quarterfinals
4	Finland	4	1	0	1	2	10	12	−2	4	Relegation round
5	Latvia	4	0	0	0	4	5	26	−21	0	Relegation round

Source: IIHF

Results

All times are local (Eastern Time Zone – UTC−5).

December 26, 2008; 14:30	Latvia	1–4 (0–1, 0–1, 1–2)	Russia	Ottawa Civic Centre (capacity: 9,862); Attendance: 9,441 (95.7%)

Game reference
Jānis Ozoliņš 58:03 / Goals / 16:56 (PP1) Vyacheslav Voinov; 31:38 Pavel Chernov; 47:01 Maxim Goncharov; 59:48 Dmitri Klopov

December 26, 2008; 18:30	Finland	1–3 (0–2, 1–0, 0–1)	Sweden	Ottawa Civic Centre (capacity: 9,862); Attendance: 9,658 (97.9%)

Game reference

Harri Säteri
Goalies
Jacob Markström
Referees:
(Canada) Guy Pellerin
(Switzerland) Brent Reiber
Linesmen:
(Czech Republic) František Kalivoda
(Canada) Sylvain Losier

	0–1	09:15 – Johansson (Ullström)
	0–2	12:38 – Rundblad (Petersson, Ullström)
Rajala – 21:12	1–2
	1–3	59:20 – Backlund (ENG)

8 min
Penalties
8 min
21
Shots
28

December 27, 2008; 18:30	Slovakia	7–2 (2–2, 3–0, 2–0)	Latvia	Ottawa Civic Centre (capacity: 9,862); Attendance: 9,370 (95.0%)

Game reference
Radoslav Tybor (PP1) 01:54; Ondrej Rusnák (PP1) 16:26; Marek Hrivík 33:20; Ondrej Rusnák (PP1) 33:58; Radoslav Tybor 38:21; Tomáš Tatar 42:12; Adam Bezák (SH1) 47:34 / Goals / 07:29 Jānis Straupe; 14:05 (PP1) Ronalds Cinks

December 28, 2008; 14:30	Russia	5–2 (3–1, 1–1, 1–0)	Finland	Ottawa Civic Centre (capacity: 9,862); Attendance: 9,715 (98.5%)

Game reference
Nikita Filatov 07:56; Evgeni Dadonov 08:34; Dmitri Klopov 11:29; Nikita Filatov 29:56; Dmitri Klopov (PP1) 58:14 / Goals / 05:10 Jani Lajunen; 23:55 (PP1) Joonas Nättinen

December 28, 2008; 18:30	Sweden	3–1 (2–0, 1–0, 0–1)	Slovakia	Ottawa Civic Centre (capacity: 9,862); Attendance: 9,726 (98.6%)

Game reference
Simon Hjalmarsson 01:02; Mikael Backlund (PP1) 14:42; Erik Karlsson 33:30 / Goals / 45:33 (PP1) Martin Uhnák

December 29, 2008; 14:30	Latvia	1–10 (1–5, 0–1, 0–4)	Sweden	Ottawa Civic Centre (capacity: 9,862); Attendance: 9,622 (97.6%)

Game reference
Roberts Jekimovs 19:53 / Goals / 02:13 (PP1) Mattias Tedenby; 09:15 Magnus Pääjärvi-Svensson; 13:42 André Petersson; 17:39 Magnus Pääjärvi-Svensson; 19:10 Nicklas Lasu; 26:31 Simon Hjalmarsson; 40:33 Joakim Andersson; 41:33 (PP1) Erik Karlsson; 48:31 (PP1) David Ullström; 49:18 Nicklas Lasu

December 30, 2008; 14:30	Russia	8–1 (2–1, 4–0, 2–0)	Slovakia	Ottawa Civic Centre (capacity: 9,862); Attendance: 9,419 (95.5%)

Game reference
Nikita Filatov 2:12; Maxim Goncharov (PP1) 18:34; Maxim Goncharov 21:05; Nikita Filatov (PP1) 24:29; Igor Golovkov 28:32; Nikita Filatov (PP1) 29:15; Sergei Andronov 55:37; Sergei Korostin 56:52 / Goals / 13:12 Adam Bezák

December 30, 2008; 18:30	Finland	5–1 (2–0, 3–1, 0–0)	Latvia	Ottawa Civic Centre (capacity: 9,862); Attendance: 9,376 (95.1%)

Game reference
Tomi Sallinen (PP1) 02:03; Nestori Lähde 14:25; Mikael Granlund 23:58; Mikael Granlund (PP2) 27:17; Antti Roppo 30:34 / Goals / 34:03 (PP2) Roberts Jekimovs

December 31, 2008; 14:30	Sweden	5–0 (4–0, 0–0, 1–0)	Russia	Ottawa Civic Centre (capacity: 9,862); Attendance: 9,675 (98.1%)

Game reference
André Petersson 05:01; Simon Hjalmarsson 10:00; André Petersson (PP1) 16:50; Mikael Backlund (PP1) 17:31; Marcus Johansson 43:55 / Goals

December 31, 2008; 18:30	Slovakia	3–2 GWS (0–0, 1–2, 1–0); OT: 0–0, GWS: 1–0	Finland	Ottawa Civic Centre (capacity: 9,862); Attendance: 9,312 (94.4%)

Game reference
Richard Pánik (PP1) 30:36; Adam Bezák 48:32; Tomáš Tatar (GWG) 65:00 / Goals / 24:40 (PP2) Niclas Lucenius; 37:37 Nestori Lähde

=== Relegation round ===
The results from matches between teams from the same group in the preliminary round are carried forward to this round.

Pos	Team	Pld	W	OTW	OTL	L	GF	GA	GD	Pts	Relegation
7	Finland	3	3	0	0	0	15	3	+12	9	
8	Latvia	3	2	0	0	1	15	7	+8	6	
9	Germany	3	1	0	0	2	11	10	+1	3	Relegated to the 2010 Division I
10	Kazakhstan	3	0	0	0	3	2	23	−21	0	Relegated to the 2010 Division I

Source: IIHF

==== Results ====
All times are local (Eastern Time Zone – UTC−5).

January 2, 2009; 18:30	Germany	1–7 (1–1, 0–5, 0–1)	Latvia	Ottawa Civic Centre (capacity: 9,862); Attendance: 9,888 (100.2%)

Game reference
Daniel Weiß 7:06 / Goals / 7:34 Roberts Bukarts; 25:23 Roberts Bukarts; 27:55 Jānis Straupe; 28:57 Roberts Bukarts; 29:28 (SH1) Vitālijs Pavlovs; 36:01 Aldis Pizāns; 44:44 Ronalds Cinks

January 3, 2009; 18:30	Finland	7–1 (3–0, 2–1, 2–0)	Kazakhstan	Ottawa Civic Centre (capacity: 9,862); Attendance: 9,180 (93.1%)

Game reference
Jyri Niemi 00:22; Joonas Rask 06:29; Tomi Sallinen 16:32; Antti Roppo (SH1) 27:26; Teemu Hartikainen (PP1) 39:09; Toni Rajala (PP2) 44:33; Teemu Hartikainen (PP1) 54:13 / Goals / 21:03 Konstantin Savenkov

January 4, 2009; 14:30	Finland	3–1 (2–0, 0–1, 1–0)	Germany	Ottawa Civic Centre (capacity: 9,862); Attendance: 9,192 (93.2%)

Game reference
Tommi Kivistö 12:40; Teemu Hartikainen 13:02; Jyri Niemi (PP1) 41:31 / Goals / 29:39 Jerome Flaake

January 4, 2009; 18:30	Latvia	7–1 (1–0, 1–0, 5–1)	Kazakhstan	Ottawa Civic Centre (capacity: 9,862); Attendance: 9,173 (93.0%)

Game reference
Roberts Jekimovs 12:53; Jānis Ozoliņš 29:10; Roberts Bukarts (SH1) 41:34; Artjoms Ogorodņikovs 48:43; Ralfs Freibergs 55:15; Artjoms Ogorodņikovs (PP1) 57:58; Roberts Jekimovs (PP1) 59:49 / Goals / 55:01 Konstantin Savenkov

=== Final round ===
==== Bracket ====
Quarter-Finals
A2	United States	3
B3	Slovakia	5
B2	Russia	5
A3	Czech Republic	1

Semi-Finals
B3	Slovakia	3
B1	Sweden	5
B2	Russia	5
A1	Canada (GWS)	6

Gold Medal Game
B1	Sweden	1
A1	Canada	5
Bronze Medal Game
B3	Slovakia	2
B2	Russia	5

==== Quarterfinals ====
January 2, 2009; 15:30	United States	3–5 (1–3, 0–0, 2–2)	Slovakia	Scotiabank Place (capacity: 19,153); Attendance: 18,042 (94.2%)

Game reference
Ian Cole (PP1) 12:01; Jonathon Blum (PP1) 45:31; James van Riemsdyk 58:42 / Goals / 11:05 Adam Bezák; 13:41 Tomáš Tatar; 17:53 Jozef Molnár; 51:38 Richard Pánik; 57:46 (ENG) Tomáš Tatar

January 2, 2009; 19:30	Russia	5–1 (1–0, 0–0, 4–1)	Czech Republic	Scotiabank Place (capacity: 19,153); Attendance: 18,753 (97.9%)

Game reference
Sergei Andronov (PP1) 11:53; Nikita Filatov 41:25; Evgeny Grachev (SH2) 47:26; Evgeni Dadonov 54:02; Pavel Chernov (PP1) 59:29 / Goals / 48:01 (PP2) Radko Gudas

==== Semifinals ====
January 3, 2009; 15:30	Sweden	5–3 (0–1, 1–1, 4–1)	Slovakia	Scotiabank Place (capacity: 19,153); Attendance: 18,112 (94.6%)

Game reference
Mikael Backlund 30:19; Mikael Backlund (PP1) 47:04; David Ullström 48:52; Simon Hjalmarsson 51:42; Oscar Möller (ENG) 58:43 / Goals / 19:56 (PP1) Marek Mertel; 35:47 Tomáš Tatar; 55:58 Tomáš Tatar

January 3, 2009; 19:30	Canada	6–5 GWS (2–2, 1–0, 2–3); OT: 0–0, GWS: 1–0	Russia	Scotiabank Place (capacity: 19,153); Attendance: 19,327 (100.9%)

Game reference
Brett Sonne 02:02; Patrice Cormier 07:04; Jordan Eberle (PP1) 36:40; Angelo Esposito (SH1) 45:44; Jordan Eberle 59:55; Jordan Eberle (GWG) 70:00 / Goals / 05:18 Maxim Goncharov; 07:20 Dmitri Klopov; 40:51 Evgeny Grachev; 46:22 (PP2) Sergei Andronov; 57:40 Dmitri Klopov

==== 5th place playoff ====
January 4, 2009; 19:30	United States	3–2 OT (1–0, 0–0, 1–2); OT: 1–0	Czech Republic	Scotiabank Place (capacity: 19,153); Attendance: 17,936 (93.6%)

Game reference
Eric Tangradi 08:36; Cade Fairchild 53:02; James van Riemsdyk 62:49 / Goals / 42:23 Zdeněk Okál; 50:59 Ondřej Roman

==== 3rd place playoff ====
January 5, 2009; 15:30	Russia	5–2 (1–0, 2–1, 2–1)	Slovakia	Scotiabank Place (capacity: 19,153); Attendance: 18,763 (98.0%)

Game reference
04:30 Pavel Chernov; 25:56 Maxim Goncharov; 39:28 Nikita Filatov; 51:11 Nikita Filatov; 58:07 (ENG) Dmitri Kugryshev / Goals / Martin Štajnoch 30:14; Tomáš Tatar (PP1) 57:01

==== Final ====
January 5, 2009; 19:30	Canada	5–1 (1–0, 1–0, 3–1)	Sweden	Scotiabank Place (capacity: 19,153); Attendance: 20,380 (106.4%)

Game reference
00:38 P. K. Subban (PP1); 24:06 Angelo Esposito; 40:33 Cody Hodgson (PP1); 58:07 (ENG) Jordan Eberle; 59:28 (ENG) Cody Hodgson / Goals / Joakim Andersson 48:30

=== Top 10 scorers ===
Pos	Player	Country	GP	G	A	Pts	+/-	PIM
1	Cody Hodgson	Canada	6	5	11	16	+8	2
2	John Tavares	Canada	6	8	7	15	+7	0
3	Jordan Eberle	Canada	6	6	7	13	+9	2
4	Nikita Filatov	Russia	7	8	3	11	+3	6
5	Tomáš Tatar	Slovakia	7	7	4	11	-2	4
6	Jordan Schroeder	United States	6	3	8	11	+1	2
7	James van Riemsdyk	United States	6	6	4	10	+1	4
8	Jan Káňa	Czech Republic	6	6	3	9	+2	0
9	Teemu Hartikainen	Finland	6	3	6	9	+4	4
9	P. K. Subban	Canada	6	3	6	9	+12	6
9	Colin Wilson	United States	6	3	6	9	+1	4

GP = Games played; G = Goals; A = Assists; Pts = Points; +/− = Plus/minus; PIM = Penalties In Minutes

=== Goaltending leaders ===
(minimum 40% team's total ice time)

Pos	Player	Country	MINS	GA	Sv%	GAA	SO
1	Jacob Markström	Sweden	298	8	.943	1.61	1
2	Juha Metsola	Finland	245	6	.939	1.47	0
3	Vadim Zhelobnyuk	Russia	292	11	.925	2.26	0
4	Dustin Tokarski	Canada	248	11	.906	2.65	1
5	Nauris Enkuzens	Latvia	346	25	.903	4.33	0

TOI = Time on ice (minutes:seconds); SA = Shots against; GA = Goals against; GAA = Goals against average; Sv% = Save percentage; SO = Shutouts Source:
09:50, 6 January 2009 (UTC)

=== Tournament awards ===
Most Valuable Player

- (Canada) John Tavares

All-star team

- Goaltender: (Slovakia) Jaroslav Janus
- Defencemen: (Canada) P. K. Subban, (Sweden) Erik Karlsson
- Forwards: (Canada) John Tavares, (Canada) Cody Hodgson, (Russia) Nikita Filatov

IIHF best player awards

- Goaltender: (Sweden) Jacob Markström
- Defenceman: (Sweden) Erik Karlsson
- Forward: (Canada) John Tavares

=== Final standings ===
	Team
1st place, gold medalist(s)	Canada
2nd place, silver medalist(s)	Sweden
3rd place, bronze medalist(s)	Russia
4th	Slovakia
5th	United States
6th	Czech Republic
7th	Finland
8th	Latvia
9th	Germany
10th	Kazakhstan

Relegated to the 2010 Division I

== Division I ==
The Division I Championships were played between December 14 and December 20, 2008, in Herisau, Switzerland (Group A), and between December 15 and December 21, 2008 in Aalborg, Denmark (Group B).

=== Group A ===
Pos	Team	Pld	W	OTW	OTL	L	GF	GA	GD	Pts	Promotion or relegation
1	Switzerland (H)	5	5	0	0	0	31	7	+24	15	Promoted to the 2010 Top Division
2	Belarus	5	4	0	0	1	39	7	+32	12	
3	France	5	3	0	0	2	33	17	+16	9	
4	Slovenia	5	2	0	0	3	31	17	+14	6	
5	Poland	5	1	0	0	4	7	23	−16	3	
6	Estonia	5	0	0	0	5	6	76	−70	0	Relegated to the 2010 Division II

Source: IIHF
(H) Host

=== Group B ===
Pos	Team	Pld	W	OTW	OTL	L	GF	GA	GD	Pts	Promotion or relegation
1	Austria	5	4	0	1	0	28	9	+19	13	Promoted to the 2010 Top Division
2	Denmark (H)	5	4	0	0	1	16	13	+3	12	
3	Norway	5	2	1	0	2	14	17	−3	8	
4	Italy	5	2	1	0	2	14	10	+4	8	
5	Ukraine	5	1	0	0	4	10	16	−6	3	
6	Hungary	5	0	0	1	4	11	28	−17	1	Relegated to the 2010 Division II

Source: IIHF
(H) Host

== Division II ==
The Division II Championships were played between December 15 and December 21, 2008, in Miercurea Ciuc, Romania (Group A), and between January 10 and January 15, 2009 in Logroño, Spain (Group B).

=== Group A ===
Pos	Team	Pld	W	OTW	OTL	L	GF	GA	GD	Pts	Promotion
1	Japan	5	4	0	0	1	45	11	+34	12	Promoted to the 2010 Division I
2	Lithuania	5	4	0	0	1	35	9	+26	12	
3	South Korea	5	2	2	0	1	19	18	+1	10	
4	Belgium	5	2	0	0	3	17	32	−15	6	
5	Serbia	5	0	1	1	3	10	33	−23	3	
6	Romania (H)	5	0	0	2	3	9	32	−23	2	

Source: IIHF
(H) Host

=== Group B ===
China, having been relegated to Division III in 2008, was returned to Division II after New Zealand forfeited due to finances.

Pos	Team	Pld	W	OTW	OTL	L	GF	GA	GD	Pts	Promotion
1	Croatia	5	5	0	0	0	34	15	+19	15	Promoted to the 2010 Division I
2	Great Britain	5	4	0	0	1	29	10	+19	12	
3	Netherlands	5	3	0	0	2	28	12	+16	9	
4	Mexico	5	2	0	0	3	11	27	−16	6	
5	Spain (H)	5	1	0	0	4	12	19	−7	3	
6	China	5	0	0	0	5	9	40	−31	0	

Source: IIHF
(H) Host

== Division III ==
The Division III tournament was to have been played in North Korea, but was cancelled. The Division III was scheduled to include the following:

Team	Qualification
Iceland	Placed 6th in Division II Group A last year and was relegated.
China	Placed 6th in Division II Group B last year and was relegated, but returned to Division II after New Zealand forfeited.
Australia	Placed 4th in Division III last year.
Turkey	Placed 6th in Division III last year.
Bulgaria	Placed 7th in Division III last year.
North Korea	Hosts, first appearance since 1993.
