= Tybor =

Tybor is a surname. Notable people with the surname include:

- Patrik Tybor (born 1987), Slovak cyclist
- Radoslav Tybor (born 1989), Slovak ice hockey player
