= Ondřej Roman =

Czech professional ice hockey forward (born 1989)

- Born: 8 February 1989 (age 37) Ostrava, Czechoslovakia
- Height: 6 ft 0 in (183 cm)
- Weight: 185 lb (84 kg; 13 st 3 lb)
- Position: Left wing
- Shoots: Left
- ELH team Former teams: HC Dynamo Pardubice; Texas Stars; San Antonio Rampage; Avtomobilist Yekaterinburg; HC Vítkovice Steel; Ilves
- NHL draft: 136th overall, 2007; Dallas Stars
- Playing career: 2006–present

Ondřej Roman (born 8 February 1989) is a Czech professional ice hockey forward currently playing for HC Dynamo Pardubice of the Czech Extraliga (ELH). He was a first round selection, 23rd overall by Avtomobilist Yekaterinburg in the 2009 KHL Junior Draft.

== Playing career ==
Roman made his professional debut in the 2005–06 season, in his native Czech Extraliga with his junior club, HC Vítkovice. The following season harbouring NHL ambitions he moved to North America to play major junior hockey in the Western Hockey League with the Spokane Chiefs. After his rookie season, Roman was selected 136th overall in the 2007 NHL entry draft by the Dallas Stars.

Roman returned to the Czech Republic for a second stint with his original club, HC Vítkovice. During his second season with the Steelers in 2009–10, on 29 January 2010, Roman was signed by the Dallas Stars to a three-year entry-level contract. Roman reported the next year to the Stars' American Hockey League affiliate, the Texas Stars. In his first professional North American season, Roman appeared in 72 games with Texas, contributing with a career high 22 points.

During the 2011–12 season, unable to gain traction on his debut AHL season, Roman was traded by the Stars to the Florida Panthers in exchange for Angelo Esposito on 13 January 2012. He was immediately assigned to AHL affiliate, the San Antonio Rampage. Roman finished out the remaining year of his contract with the Panthers by returning again to HC Vítkovice. Marking the end of his NHL aspirations, Roman signed a new contract extension to continue with the Steel on a two-year deal.

With three productive seasons in the Czech Extraliga, Roman signed a two-year contract in the KHL with his draft team, Avtomobilist Yekaterinburg on 13 May 2015.

== Career statistics ==
=== Regular season and playoffs ===
			Regular season					Playoffs
Season	Team	League	GP	G	A	Pts	PIM	GP	G	A	Pts	PIM
2003–04	HC Sareza Ostrava	CZE U18	55	38	27	65	61	—	—	—	—	—
2004–05	HC Vítkovice	CZE U18	2	0	3	3	2	—	—	—	—	—
2004–05	HC Vítkovice	CZE U20	30	8	3	11	12	—	—	—	—	—
2004–05	HC Sareza Ostrava	CZE U20	7	2	2	4	6	—	—	—	—	—
2005–06	HC Vítkovice Steel	CZE U18	—	—	—	—	—	4	1	8	9	0
2005–06	HC Vítkovice Steel	CZE U20	46	17	27	44	42	5	0	3	3	4
2005–06	HC Vítkovice Steel	ELH	1	0	0	0	0	—	—	—	—	—
2006–07	Spokane Chiefs	WHL	70	4	44	48	42	6	1	4	5	0
2007–08	Spokane Chiefs	WHL	72	15	46	61	28	21	9	11	20	6
2008–09	Spokane Chiefs	WHL	32	10	22	32	19	12	1	4	5	10
2008–09	HC Vítkovice Steel	CZE U20	4	1	3	4	0	—	—	—	—	—
2008–09	HC Vítkovice Steel	ELH	26	3	6	9	2	—	—	—	—	—
2009–10	HC Vítkovice Steel	CZE U20	10	9	17	26	8	—	—	—	—	—
2009–10	HC Vítkovice Steel	ELH	26	1	2	3	6	—	—	—	—	—
2009–10	HC Havířov Panthers	CZE.2	56	9	19	28	22	—	—	—	—	—
2010–11	Texas Stars	AHL	72	8	14	22	32	2	0	1	1	0
2011–12	Texas Stars	AHL	24	1	4	5	4	—	—	—	—	—
2011–12	Idaho Steelheads	ECHL	6	2	4	6	2	—	—	—	—	—
2011–12	San Antonio Rampage	AHL	16	1	2	3	2	—	—	—	—	—
2011–12	Cincinnati Cyclones	ECHL	3	1	1	2	2	—	—	—	—	—
2012–13	HC Vítkovice Steel	ELH	52	8	26	34	34	11	3	7	10	2
2013–14	HC Vítkovice Steel	ELH	51	13	35	48	44	8	0	3	3	2
2014–15	HC Vítkovice Steel	ELH	52	13	28	41	48	3	1	2	3	0
2015–16	Avtomobilist Yekaterinburg	KHL	32	2	6	8	8	—	—	—	—	—
2016–17	HC Vítkovice Ridera	ELH	52	13	17	30	24	5	1	0	1	2
2017–18	HC Vítkovice Ridera	ELH	49	10	23	33	45	4	2	1	3	2
2018–19	HC Vítkovice Ridera	ELH	50	14	26	40	20	7	0	4	4	2
2019–20	HC Vítkovice Ridera	ELH	45	14	19	33	28	—	—	—	—	—
2020–21	Ilves	Liiga	12	1	3	4	0	—	—	—	—	—
2020–21	HC Dynamo Pardubice	ELH	28	4	6	10	8	8	2	1	3	0
2021–22	HC Dynamo Pardubice	ELH	33	1	4	5	8	—	—	—	—	—
2022–23	Dragons de Rouen	FRA	27	9	16	25	4	—	—	—	—	—
2022–23	BK Mladá Boleslav	ELH	12	2	5	7	2	4	0	1	1	0
2023–24	BK Mladá Boleslav	ELH	49	8	15	23	18	—	—	—	—	—
2024–25	HC RT TORAX Poruba 2011	CZE.2	50	9	28	37	16	5	3	2	5	4
2025–26	HC RT TORAX Poruba 2011	CZE.2	45	13	23	36	22	—	—	—	—	—
ELH totals			526	107	209	316	287	50	9	19	28	10

=== International ===
Year	Team	Event	Result	GP	G	A	Pts	PIM
2006	Czech Republic	WJC18	3rd place, bronze medalist(s)	7	0	1	1	2
2007	Czech Republic	WJC18	9th	6	2	4	6	0
2009	Czech Republic	WJC	6th	6	4	4	8	0
Junior totals				19	6	9	15	2
