= Angelo Esposito =

Canadian ice hockey player (born 1989)

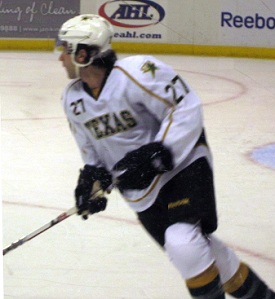
- Esposito with the Texas Stars in 2012
- Born: February 20, 1989 (age 37) Montreal, Quebec, Canada
- Height: 6 ft 1 in (185 cm)
- Weight: 190 lb (86 kg; 13 st 8 lb)
- Position: Centre
- Shot: Left
- Played for: Chicago Wolves; San Antonio Rampage; Texas Stars; Lahti Pelicans; Milano Rossoblu; SG Cortina; České Budějovice Motor
- NHL draft: 20th overall, 2007; Pittsburgh Penguins
- Playing career: 2008–2017

Angelo Esposito (born February 20, 1989) is a Canadian real estate investor, landlord, and former professional ice hockey player. Esposito was drafted in the first round (20th overall) by the Pittsburgh Penguins in the 2007 NHL entry draft.

== Playing career ==
=== QMJHL ===
Esposito's Quebec Major Junior Hockey League (QMJHL) career started in controversy. He was considered a possible first overall draft choice in the QMJHL, but told all general managers that he intended to play college hockey in the NCAA. As a result, he was passed up by the first ten picks in the QMJHL Draft. Just minutes before the Val-d'Or Foreurs were slated to make their pick, at eleventh overall, the Quebec Remparts announced that they had traded several players and draft choices to get the Foreurs' drafting position and selected Esposito.

Esposito began his QMJHL rookie season, in 2005–06, centering the first line. Esposito scored in his first regular season game on his very first shift against the Rimouski Océanic. By mid-season, Esposito was selected QMJHL Rookie of the Month twice and the Offensive Player of the Week once. He finished his rookie campaign with 98 points, second among QMJHL's rookies, behind Claude Giroux, and was named the league rookie of the year. Along with wingers Mathieu Melanson (86 points) and Alexander Radulov (152 points), the Remparts' first line was the most productive scoring line in the entire league. Despite losing in the President's Cup final series 4–2 to the Moncton Wildcats, Esposito and the Remparts earned a berth in the 2006 Memorial Cup as runner up to the tournament hosts.

Impressing many in his major junior rookie season, Esposito was touted early as a possible first-overall pick for the 2007 NHL entry draft. He had, in fact, already drawn comparisons to former Remparts star Guy Lafleur. However, declining offensive production at the junior level – his points total fell from 98 to 79 – led to him eventually being picked twentieth overall by the Pittsburgh Penguins.

On February 26, 2008, the Penguins traded his NHL rights to the Atlanta Thrashers along with Colby Armstrong, Erik Christensen, and a 2008 first-round draft pick in a trade-deadline deal for Marián Hossa and Pascal Dupuis.

=== Professional ===
At the conclusion of his 2007–08 season with the Remparts, he made his professional debut with the Chicago Wolves of the American Hockey League (AHL). In the off-season, he was traded in the QMJHL by the Remparts to the Montreal Juniors on June 7, 2008. After a strong start with the Montreal Juniors, Esposito was named to Team Canada and competed in the U20 World Championships, scoring the game-winning goal against Sweden in the gold medal game. After returning from the World Juniors, Esposito tore his ACL in his right knee, causing him to miss the rest of the season. After only 12 games in the American Hockey League (AHL) with the Chicago wolves in 2009, Esposito re-tore his ACL causing him to require a second knee surgery.

On July 8, 2011, he was traded to the Florida Panthers in exchange for Kenndal McArdle. On January 13, 2012, he was traded to the Dallas Stars for Ondřej Roman. After the 2011–2012 season was over Esposito became an unrestricted free agent.

On July 26, 2012, he signed a one-year contract with Finnish hockey club Pelicans from Lahti. After producing 7 points in 29 games in the 2012–13 season with the Pelicans, Esposito was mutually released from the remainder of his contract and immediately moved to play in Italy with Hockey Milano Rossoblu from Milan on January 17, 2013.

On July 21, 2014, Esposito returned to North America and signed a one-year contract in the ECHL with the Fort Wayne Komets. After the season opening game of the 2014–15 season with the Komets, Esposito decided to take a hiatus from hockey and Fort Wayne waived and released him from his contract.

After taking a years hiatus from professional hockey, Esposito returned to Italy signing a one-year contract with SG Cortina of the AlpsHL on September 5, 2015. He finished the season with 38 points in 31 games. During the 2016-17 season, Esposito had a 9-game stint with České Budějovice Motor of the Czech 2nd league before he suffered a concussion while playing with the team. He only scored 1 goal in the 9 games he played with the team and at the end of the season Esposito retired from professional hockey.

== International play ==
Medal record

Representing Canada

Ice hockey

World Junior Championships
Gold medal – first place	2009 Canada	

Ivan Hlinka Memorial Tournament
Gold medal – first place	2006 Czech Republic	

World U17 Hockey Challenge
Gold medal – first place	2006 Canada	

Esposito competed for Team Quebec as captain during his QMJHL rookie season in the 2006 World U-17 Hockey Challenge, capturing gold. Later that year, he also captained Team Canada's under-18 squad at the 2006 Ivan Hlinka Memorial Tournament and won another gold medal. After three years of being cut from Team Canada's World Junior Championships selection camp, he eventually made the team for the 2009 World Junior Championships in Ottawa. He scored 4 points in 6 games, including the game-winning goal in the gold medal game, helping Team Canada to its record-tying fifth straight gold medal.

== Post–playing career ==
=== Real estate investor ===
Esposito currently works in the Quebec area as a real estate investor and landlord. He first bought property in 2015, but continued to buy more soon after.

=== Politics ===
==== 2019 federal election ====
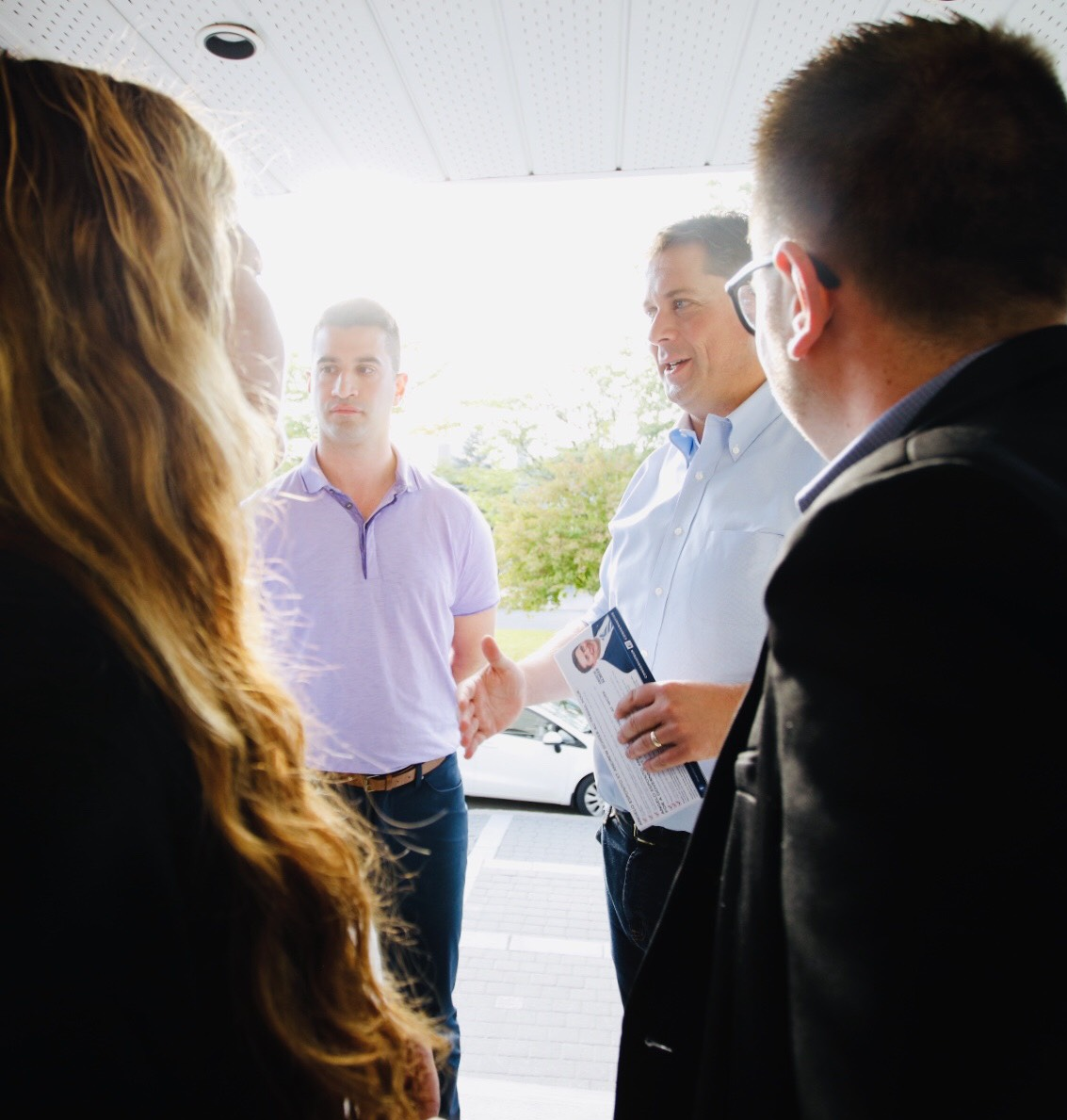
Esposito with Andrew Scheer in 2019.

Esposito was the candidate for the Conservative Party in the riding of Alfred-Pellan for the 2019 Canadian federal election. In the 2019 election, Esposito got 5,917 votes, which gave him 10.90% of the vote.

==== Electoral record ====
2019 Canadian federal election: Alfred-Pellan
Party	Candidate	Votes	%	±%	Expenditures
Liberal	Angelo Iacono	26,015	47.90	+3.39	$97,523.02
Bloc Québécois	Michel Lachance	15,549	28.63	+10.80	$16,657.44
Conservative	Angelo Esposito	5,917	10.90	-0.45	none listed
New Democratic	Andriana Kocini	4,109	7.57	-16.41	$443.23
Green	Marguerite Howells	1,958	3.61	+1.63	$0.00
People's	Mathieu Couture	471	0.87		$6,000.82
Pour l'Indépendance du Québec	Julius Buté	177	0.33		$0.00
Independent	Dwayne Cappelletti	113	0.21		$582.53
Total valid votes/expense limit		54,309	98.24		
Total rejected ballots		973	1.76	+0.54	
Turnout		55,282	69.90	+2.59	
Eligible voters		79,083			
Liberal hold		Swing		-3.71	
Source: Elections Canada

== Personal life ==
Born in Montreal and raised in Mount Royal, Quebec, Esposito grew up figure skating before beginning to play organized hockey at the age of six. At ten-years-old, he made the decision between the two sports to focus on hockey. He attended high school first at Selwyn House School then Shattuck-Saint Mary's in Faribault, Minnesota, following in the footsteps of such NHL stars as Sidney Crosby, Zach Parise and Jonathan Toews.

Despite his last name, famous in hockey circles, Esposito is not related to Hockey Hall of Famers Phil and Tony Esposito. He does, however, have uncles named Phil and Tony, in addition to sharing Phil Esposito's jersey number 7 and February 20 birth date.

== Career statistics ==
=== Regular season and playoffs ===
			Regular season					Playoffs
Season	Team	League	GP	G	A	Pts	PIM	GP	G	A	Pts	PIM
2004–05	Shattuck-Saint Mary's	Midget AAA	68	31	35	66	47	—	—	—	—	—
2005–06	Quebec Remparts	QMJHL	57	39	59	98	45	23	6	5	11	4
2006–07	Quebec Remparts	QMJHL	60	27	52	79	63	5	4	3	7	2
2007–08	Quebec Remparts	QMJHL	56	30	39	69	69	11	4	6	10	6
2007–08	Chicago Wolves	AHL	1	0	0	0	0	—	—	—	—	—
2008–09	Montreal Juniors	QMJHL	35	24	18	42	25	—	—	—	—	—
2009–10	Chicago Wolves	AHL	12	0	4	4	2	—	—	—	—	—
2010–11	Chicago Wolves	AHL	57	3	10	13	35	—	—	—	—	—
2011–12	San Antonio Rampage	AHL	16	2	3	5	8	—	—	—	—	—
2011–12	Cincinnati Cyclones	ECHL	3	0	1	1	0	—	—	—	—	—
2011–12	Texas Stars	AHL	38	5	11	16	19	—	—	—	—	—
2012–13	Lahti Pelicans	SM-l	29	3	4	7	10	—	—	—	—	—
2012–13	Milano Rossoblu	ITA	5	1	3	4	2	—	—	—	—	—
2013–14	HC Bolzano	EBEL	35	1	7	8	14	13	0	0	0	0
2014–15	Fort Wayne Komets	ECHL	1	0	0	0	2	—	—	—	—	—
2015–16	SG Cortina	ITA	31	15	23	38	26	4	0	1	1	4
2016–17	Motor České Budějovice	CZE.2	9	1	0	1	8	—	—	—	—	—
AHL totals			124	10	28	38	64	—	—	—	—	—

=== International ===
Year	Team	Event	Result	GP	G	A	Pts	PIM
2006	Canada Quebec	WHC17	1st place, gold medalist(s)	6	3	1	4	0
2007	Canada	WJC18	1st place, gold medalist(s)	6	3	3	6	0
2009	Canada	WJC	1st place, gold medalist(s)	6	3	1	4	4
Junior totals				18	9	5	14	4

== Awards ==
QMJHL

- Named Player of the Week for September 26 – October 2, 2005.
- Named Rookie of the Month for October and November 2005.
- Awarded the Michel Bergeron Trophy (offensive rookie of the year) in 2006
- Named to the QMJHL All-Rookie Team in 2006.

Awards and achievements
Preceded by Jordan Staal	Pittsburgh Penguins first-round draft pick 2007	Succeeded by Simon Després
