= Tim Schüle =

German ice hockey player

Tim Schuele
- Born: November 9, 1990 (age 35) Bietigheim-Bissingen, Germany
- Height: 6 ft 0 in (183 cm)
- Weight: 196 lb (89 kg; 14 st 0 lb)
- Position: Defence
- Shoots: Left
- DEL team Former teams: Augsburger Panther; Düsseldorfer EG; Thomas Sabo Ice Tigers; Bietigheim Steelers
- Playing career: 2008–present

Tim Schuele (born November 9, 1990) is a German professional ice hockey defenceman currently playing for Augsburger Panther in the Deutsche Eishockey Liga (DEL).

Schuele returned to Düsseldorfer EG after he previously played five seasons with the Thomas Sabo Ice Tigers. He joined the Löwen Frankfurt in 2017

Following four seasons playing with hometown club, Bietigheim Steelers, Schüle left the club after relegation to the DEL2 and signed a one-year contract to remain in the DEL with Augsburger Panther on 5 April 2023.
