= Nikita Filatov =

Russian ice hockey player (born 1990)

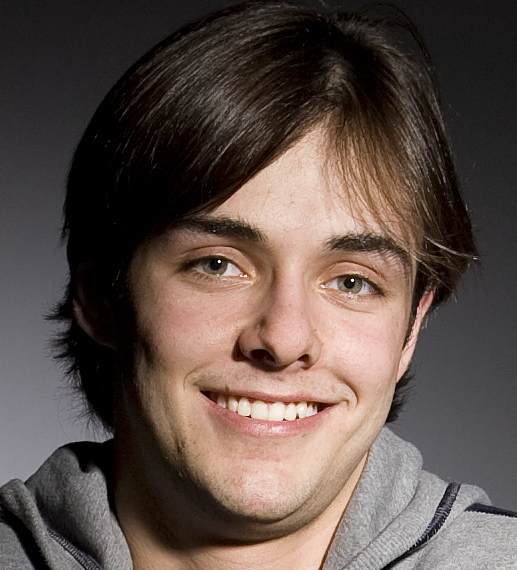
- Filatov in 2010
- Born: May 25, 1990 (age 36) Moscow, Soviet Union
- Height: 6 ft 0 in (183 cm)
- Weight: 190 lb (86 kg; 13 st 8 lb)
- Position: Left wing
- Shot: Right
- Played for: CSKA Moscow; Columbus Blue Jackets; Ottawa Senators; Salavat Yulaev Ufa; Yugra Khanty-Mansiysk; Torpedo Nizhny Novgorod; Admiral Vladivostok; Dynamo Moscow; Lada Togliatti; Neftekhimik Nizhnekamsk; Spartak Moscow
- NHL draft: 6th overall, 2008; Columbus Blue Jackets
- Playing career: 2007–2019

Nikita Vasilyevich Filatov (Никита Васильевич Филатов; born May 25, 1990) is a Russian former professional ice hockey player who was a left winger in the Kontinental Hockey League (KHL). Prior to 2012, Filatov played in North America for the Ottawa Senators and Columbus Blue Jackets of the National Hockey League (NHL).

At the 2008 NHL entry draft, Filatov was selected sixth overall by the Blue Jackets. Filatov was the top-ranked European skater by the NHL Central Scouting Bureau. Filatov played two seasons with the Blue Jackets organization. During the 2009–10 season, Filatov was unhappy with his situation in Columbus and was loaned to CSKA Moscow for the remainder of the season. At the 2011 NHL entry draft, the Blue Jackets then traded him to Ottawa in exchange for a third-round draft pick. In December 2011, the Senators loaned Filatov to CSKA Moscow for the balance of the 2011–12 season. The following season, Filatov signed with Salavat Yulaev. The Senators chose not to tender Filatov a qualifying offer, making him a free agent.

Filatov has represented Russia in international hockey at two World U18 Championships, winning gold and silver medals, and three World Junior Championships, where he has won two bronze medals. He was named to the Tournament All-Star Team at the 2008 World U18 Championships and the 2009 World Junior Championships.

== Playing career ==
=== Junior ===
Filatov played minor and junior hockey in the CSKA Red Army hockey system from the age of 13. At the age of 15 during the 2005–06 season, he made his debut for CSKA-2—the club's junior team—where he continued to play during the 2006–07 season, and averaged more than three points per game. In the same season, Filatov made his international debut for Russia at the World Under 18 Championship.

During the 2007–08 season, Filatov made his professional Russian Superleague (RSL) debut with CSKA, seeing limited action in five games. He spent the majority of the season playing at the junior level in Russia. With his CSKA junior team, Filatov played in 23 games, scoring 23 goals and providing 24 assists. Leading up to the 2008 NHL entry draft, the League's annual meeting at which the rights to amateur players are divided among teams, the NHL's Central Scouting Bureau ranked Filatov as the top European skater in their mid-term and final rankings. After the 2007–08 season, Filatov was selected sixth overall at the Draft by the Columbus Blue Jackets.

Filatov was also the first overall selection in the 2008 Canadian Hockey League Import Draft, selected by the Sudbury Wolves of the Ontario Hockey League (OHL). Sudbury General Manager Mike Foligno was comfortable with the risks of not knowing whether Filatov would play at junior or professional level when he came to North America. Blue Jackets general manager Scott Howson would not guarantee Filatov a place on their team, saying, "We've already told Nikita that we'll see how things go in training camp and we'll decide what's best for him."

=== Professional ===
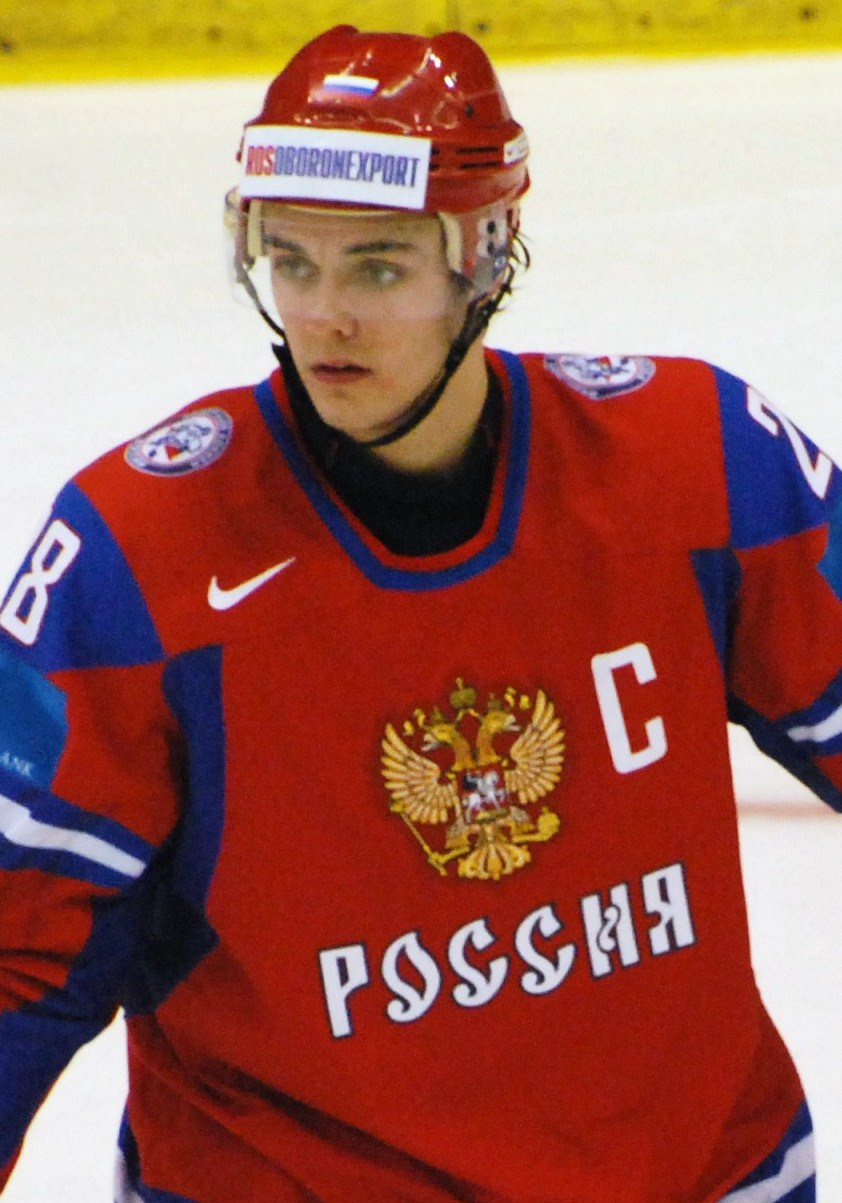
Filatov with the Russian national under-20 team at the 2010 World Junior Hockey Championship.

After being drafted by the Blue Jackets, Filatov signed a three-year contract with the club on July 10, 2008. His base salary for the contract was $875,000, with bonus clauses that could bring the value as high as $1.35 million per season. His signing with Columbus created some controversy within the Kontinental Hockey League (KHL), however, as League President Alexander Medvedev claimed that the Blue Jackets owed CSKA Moscow compensation of at least $1.5 million for signing Filatov. Medvedev claimed that although the term of the contract had expired, under Russian law it did not terminate until an indemnity amount had been negotiated. The Blue Jackets and Filatov believed that giving his club 30 days notice was sufficient to terminate the contract. CSKA threatened to withhold Filatov's transfer card, thus impeding his ability to play in another league, but Filatov, his lawyers and the Blue Jackets believed they had followed the necessary tenets of Russian law. Filatov's contract was one of six reviewed by the International Ice Hockey Federation (IIHF) in an attempt to mediate the disputes between the KHL and NHL. During this investigation, the players were unable to play international hockey sanctioned by the IIHF. In September, the KHL dropped its opposition to Filatov's contract with the Blue Jackets, and he received his transfer.

Filatov did not make the team after attending training camp with the Blue Jackets, instead making his North American professional debut for the Blue Jackets' American Hockey League (AHL) affiliate, the Syracuse Crunch. On October 15, 2008, however, Filatov was called up to the NHL, playing in his first game and scoring his first goal with the Blue Jackets on October 17 against the Nashville Predators. For the rest of the 2008–09 season, Filatov split time between the AHL and the NHL. He played eight games with the Blue Jackets, finishing the season with four goals. He became the first Blue Jackets rookie to record a hat-trick in the January 10, 2009, game against the Minnesota Wild. At the end of the season, Filatov had played 39 games with the Crunch in the AHL, scoring 16 goals and 16 assists. For his performances, he was named as a starter for the PlanetUSA team in the 2009 AHL All-Star Game.

At the start of the 2009–10 season, Filatov made the Blue Jackets roster after training camp. Although healthy, he did not play in six of the team's first 18 games, a decision made by Columbus head coach Ken Hitchcock. Filatov was unhappy with his playing time and role on the team under Hitchcock and requested to be transferred back to his Russian club team. Hitchcock and the Blue Jackets coaching staff tried to improve Filatov's attention to defensive aspects of the game. The Blue Jackets management agreed to Filatov's request to return to Russia for the remainder of the season. This arrangement resulted from direct dealings between the Blue Jackets and CSKA Moscow, where Filatov's salary was paid by the Russian club, and the Blue Jackets retained his rights. Shortly after his return to Russia, Filatov set a KHL record by scoring the game-winning goal in three consecutive games. He was named the league's best newcomer (defined by the KHL as "a player born in 1987 or later, who has played no more than 20 top-level matches in previous national tournaments") for November, and the league's best rookie for the 11th week of the season. In his shortened season in Russia, Filatov played 26 games, scoring nine goals and adding 13 assists. Initial statements by both sides indicated the player would return to Columbus after the 2009–10 season, but after returning to Russia, Filatov was less clear about his intentions for the 2010–11 season, stating, "I hope I'll be back next year, but right now, it's really hard to say because it will again be a tough decision." Howson did not comment on Filatov's stance, except to say that he expected Filatov to be at the team's training camp prior to the 2010–11 season. Subsequently, Filatov stated after the 2009–10 season that he intended to return to Columbus for training camp.

During the off-season, the Blue Jackets sent development coach Tyler Wright to Russia to train with Filatov to assess his readiness for the upcoming season, and to communicate the team's desire to work with him. Blue Jackets head coach Scott Arniel was pleased to see Filatov arrive in Columbus six weeks ahead of the team's 2010–11 season, allowing him a chance to mend relationships with his teammates who may have been annoyed by Filatov's departure. Howson said the team never doubted Filatov's skill: "Nikita has the skill and the ability to play in a top-six role." Arniel was optimistic about Filatov's return to the team, offering him a clean slate and a chance to earn a spot on one of the team's top two lines. After speaking with his friend Sergei Shirokov (who played for Arniel on the Manitoba Moose), Filatov was optimistic about working with Columbus's new head coach. Filatov started the season with the Blue Jackets at the NHL level and recorded seven assists in 23 games. In December 2010, Filatov was demoted to the AHL and spent the remainder of the season with the Springfield Falcons—Columbus's new AHL affiliate. With the Falcons, he played in 36 games, scoring nine goals and adding 11 assists.

At the 2011 NHL entry draft, Columbus severed their ties with Filatov, trading him to the Ottawa Senators in exchange for a third-round pick. Filatov left his family vacationing in the Dominican Republic and joined the Senators for their development camp at Scotiabank Place in Ottawa. He made the Senators out of training camp, but was a healthy scratch several times, splitting his time with Ottawa and the Binghamton Senators of the AHL. In November 2011, the Ottawa Citizen's Allen Panzeri reported from sources in Columbus that Filatov had refused to play the style the Blue Jackets asked of him, saying to his coach, "Filly [Filatov] don't do rebounds." In December, the Senators offered Filatov the choice to play the rest of the season with CSKA Moscow of the KHL and Filatov agreed. Senators general manager Bryan Murray suggested it was better for his development as Murray felt that Filatov needed to work on becoming stronger and compete harder to make it in the NHL. Head coach Paul MacLean felt Filatov's struggles in the NHL were surprising, considering he had 12 points in 15 games in the AHL. Filatov himself stated that he had to get better. MacLean had hoped that Filatov would have stayed and worked on his game in Binghamton, but Murray explained that it was more lucrative for Filatov to play in the KHL than at Binghamton, and did not block the transfer. Filatov did not immediately agree to terms with CSKA. For a few days it appeared that Filatov would not sign a contract with CSKA, so the Senators assigned him to Binghamton and threatened to suspend him in order to remove him from the Senators' salary cap. On December 18, 2011, Filatov agreed to a contract with CSKA Moscow.

Despite Filatov leaving for the KHL, the Senators still had hopes to develop Filatov. His contract was ready to expire in June 2012, and the Senators planned to make a qualifying contract offer to Filatov to retain his NHL rights. However, in May 2012, Filatov chose to stay in the KHL and agreed to a one-year contract with Salavat Yulaev Ufa. After he signed with Salavat Yulaev, the Senators chose to not make the offer, making him an unrestricted free agent. After three seasons in the NHL, Filatov left with only six goals and eight assists in 53 NHL games. Stephen Whyno of The Globe and Mail identified him as one of the top five biggest "draft busts" in recent NHL history. Hockey's Future also rated Filatov a bust. He later said that financial considerations were the main factor in his decision to no longer play in North America.

In the 2012–13 season, Filatov played in 47 games with Salavat Yulaev, scoring ten goals and adding 11 assists. Salavat Yulaev qualified for the 2013 Gagarin Cup playoffs, where Filatov had three goals and three assists in 13 games played. After winning a seven-game series against Metallurg Magnitogorsk, the team was eliminated by Ak Bars Kazan, four games to three. He remained with Salavat for the 2013–14 season, recording 13 goals and seven assists in 35 regular season games and one goal in the postseason. Salavat won two series in the 2014 playoffs before being defeated by Metallurg Magnitogorsk, the eventual KHL champions. Filatov played for two teams in 2014–15: after four games with Yugra, he spent the rest of the season with Torpedo Nizhny Novgorod, scoring five goals and assisting on 11 others in his 42 combined regular season appearances. He had one assist in four postseason games, as Torpedo lost in the first round to Gagarin Cup winners SKA Saint Petersburg.

Filatov did not stay with Torpedo for the 2015–16 season; he instead played for his fifth and sixth career KHL teams. After five games with Admiral Vladivostok, in which he recorded one assist, he joined HC Dynamo Moscow and had three assists in 21 games. In 2016–17, Filatov played for HC Lada Togliatti and posted career-highs in goals (19) and assists (21). Following the 2017–18 season in which Filatov split between HC Lada Togliatti and HC Neftekhimik Nizhnekamsk, Filatov left as a free agent in the off-season and continued his journeyman career in the KHL by agreeing to a one-year deal with HC Spartak Moscow on June 4, 2018. In the 2018–19 season, Filatov made a positive start to the campaign, posting 8 points in 15 games with Spartak before he was traded in a return to Salavat Yulaev Ufa in exchange for Artyom Fyodorov on November 16, 2018. In 7 games with Salavat Yulaev Ufa, he did not record a point.

Following the completion of the 2018–19 season, Filatov ended his professional playing career, transitioning to becoming a player agent under the guidance of notable agent, Sergei Isakov.

== International play ==
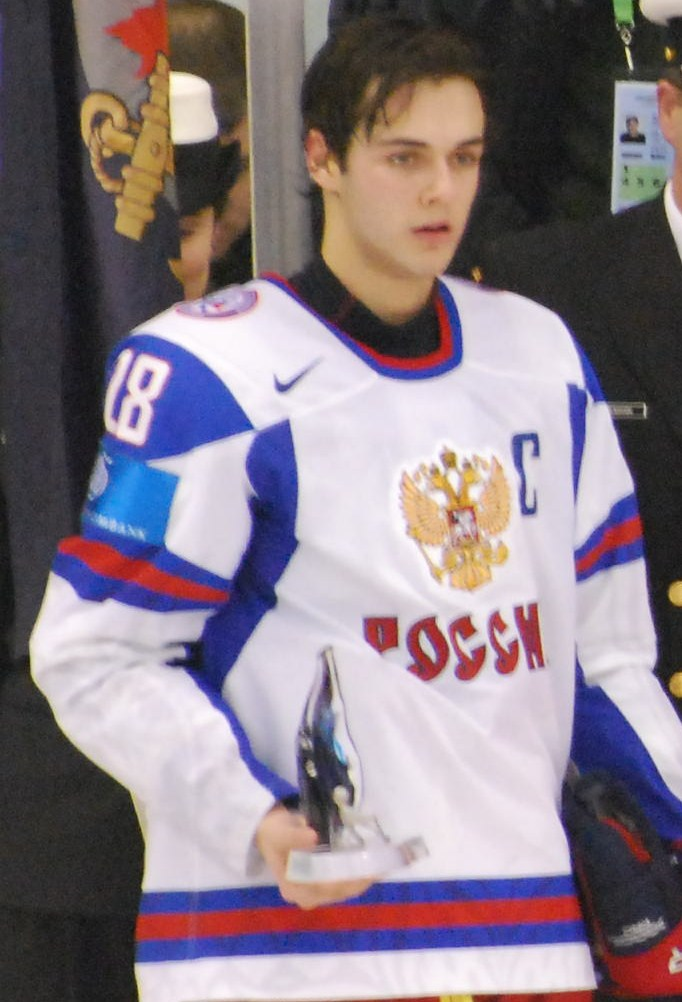
- Filatov accepts his player of the game award during the 2010 World Junior Hockey Championship.

Medal record

Ice hockey

Representing Russia

World Junior Championship
Bronze medal – third place	2009 Canada	
Bronze medal – third place	2008 Czech Republic	

IIHF U18 Championship
Silver medal – second place	2008 Russia	
Gold medal – first place	2007 Finland	

Filatov has played extensively for Russia's national teams in under-18 and under-20 tournaments. His first IIHF competition for Russia was the 2007 U18 Championship held in Finland. Russia won a gold medal in that tournament, and as an underaged player, Filatov contributed four goals and five assists in seven games. He led the Russian team in total points and was second to Alexei Cherepanov in goals scored. After this tournament, Russia's coaches named Filatov as one of the team's three best players. Filatov also played at the 2008 U18 Championship held in his native Russia. Filatov captained the team to a silver medal, scoring three goals and adding six assists. He was named to the Tournament All-Star Team.

At the 2008 World Junior Championship Filatov made his debut with Russia's under-20 junior squad. At the tournament, he scored four goals and added five assists, leading the Russian squad in total points and placing second to Viktor Tikhonov in goals scored. The Russian team captured bronze at the tournament after defeating the United States 4–2. Filatov scored two goals in the bronze medal game, and was named Russia's best player of the game by the IIHF.

The AHL's Syracuse Crunch released Filatov to participate in the 2009 World Junior Championship held in Ottawa. Filatov served as Russia's captain for the tournament. In seven games at the tournament, he scored eight goals and added three assists, which tied him for fourth in tournament scoring. The Russian team again captured the bronze medal, this time by defeating Slovakia 5–2. Filatov was named best player of the game for a preliminary round game against Finland and for the bronze medal game against Slovakia, and he was named to the Tournament All-Star Team.

After returning to Russia early in the 2009–10 season, Filatov had the opportunity to compete in a third World Junior Championship at the 2010 tournament held in Saskatchewan, Canada. As in 2009, he served as Russia's team captain. During preliminary round play, Filatov was named best player for Russia in their game against Finland. The tournament was a disappointment for the Russians after they lost to Switzerland in the quarterfinals. Prior to the fifth place game against the Czech Republic, Filatov was stripped of his captaincy and replaced by teammate Kirill Petrov after criticizing the team personnel during a media scrum. After participating in three World Junior Championships, Filatov is tied with Evgeny Kuznetsov as Russia's all-time leading scorer at the event—both forwards finished their junior careers with 26 points.

== Playing style ==
Scouting reports on Filatov were mixed in advance of the 2008 NHL Entry Draft. Sergei Nemchinov, head coach of Russia's national junior team, said of Filatov, "He definitely has an NHL upside because he can score, is a well-rounded player and is responsible in the defensive zone." Independent scouting service Red Line Report at one point declared Filatov "the next best thing to Steven Stamkos" (who was eventually selected first overall in the 2008 Draft). McKeen's Hockey scouts described him as a cross between Ilya Kovalchuk and Maxim Afinogenov. His strengths included his skating and vision, as well as the inclination to play at high intensity. The NHL's Director of European Scouting, Goran Stubb, assessed Filatov's NHL readiness as, "Nikita is a leader, has a great attitude, an excellent work ethic and tons of talent." Other scouts were not as impressed with his defensive game, preferring to focus on his offensive abilities. Off the ice, Filatov does not train in a traditional gym or weight room, preferring to run outside in sand and lift objects such as trees and boulders.

== Personal life ==
Filatov was born in Moscow, Russia, to parents Vasily and Yelena. He speaks fluent English due in large part to his mother—an English teacher who used to give him lessons at home. When he started playing professional hockey in North America for Syracuse, his mother stayed for several weeks to help him get acclimated to his new surroundings.

== Career statistics ==
=== Regular season and playoffs ===
			Regular season					Playoffs
Season	Team	League	GP	G	A	Pts	PIM	GP	G	A	Pts	PIM
2005–06	CSKA–2 Moscow	RUS.3	6	6	7	13	4	—	—	—	—	—
2006–07	CSKA–2 Moscow	RUS.3	29	13	9	22	32	—	—	—	—	—
2007–08	CSKA–2 Moscow	RUS.3	23	24	23	47	62	11	14	9	23	28
2007–08	CSKA Moscow	RSL	5	0	0	0	0	—	—	—	—	—
2008–09	Columbus Blue Jackets	NHL	8	4	0	4	0	—	—	—	—	—
2008–09	Syracuse Crunch	AHL	39	16	16	32	24	—	—	—	—	—
2009–10	Columbus Blue Jackets	NHL	13	2	0	2	8	—	—	—	—	—
2009–10	CSKA Moscow	KHL	26	9	13	22	16	3	0	1	1	4
2010–11	Springfield Falcons	AHL	36	9	11	20	20	—	—	—	—	—
2010–11	Columbus Blue Jackets	NHL	23	0	7	7	8	—	—	—	—	—
2011–12	Ottawa Senators	NHL	9	0	1	1	4	—	—	—	—	—
2011–12	Binghamton Senators	AHL	15	7	5	12	12	—	—	—	—	—
2011–12	CSKA Moscow	KHL	18	4	4	8	12	5	0	1	1	4
2011–12	Krasnaya Armiya	MHL	1	1	2	3	2	2	1	0	1	4
2012–13	Salavat Yulaev Ufa	KHL	47	10	11	21	24	13	3	3	6	6
2013–14	Salavat Yulaev Ufa	KHL	35	13	7	20	18	5	1	0	1	0
2014–15	Yugra Khanty-Mansiysk	KHL	4	1	0	1	4	—	—	—	—	—
2014–15	Torpedo Nizhny Novgorod	KHL	38	4	11	15	14	4	0	1	1	2
2015–16	Admiral Vladivostok	KHL	5	0	1	1	2	—	—	—	—	—
2015–16	Dynamo Moscow	KHL	21	0	3	3	8	—	—	—	—	—
2015–16	Dynamo Balashikha	VHL	9	3	3	6	64	—	—	—	—	—
2016–17	Lada Togliatti	KHL	57	19	21	40	60	—	—	—	—	—
2017–18	Lada Togliatti	KHL	23	3	4	7	48	—	—	—	—	—
2017–18	Neftekhimik Nizhnekamsk	KHL	8	3	3	6	27	4	0	1	1	0
2018–19	Spartak Moscow	KHL	15	3	5	8	8	—	—	—	—	—
2018–19	Salavat Yulaev Ufa	KHL	7	0	0	0	0	—	—	—	—	—
2018–19	Toros Neftekamsk	VHL	16	6	9	15	24	7	0	0	0	4
NHL totals			53	6	8	14	20	—	—	—	—	—
KHL totals			304	69	83	152	241	34	4	7	11	16

=== International ===
Year	Team	Event	Result	GP	G	A	Pts	PIM
2007	Russia	WJC18	1st place, gold medalist(s)	7	4	5	9	6
2007	Russia	U18	3rd place, bronze medalist(s)	4	2	1	3	8
2008	Russia	WJC	3rd place, bronze medalist(s)	7	4	5	9	10
2008	Russia	WJC18	2nd place, silver medalist(s)	6	3	6	9	29
2009	Russia	WJC	3rd place, bronze medalist(s)	7	8	3	11	6
2010	Russia	WJC	6th	6	1	5	6	6
Junior totals				37	22	25	47	65

Statistics Sources

== Awards ==
=== International ===
Award	Year
World U18 Championships Top Three Player for Team Russia	2007
World U18 Championships Tournament All Star Team	2008
World Junior Championships Player of the Game	2008 vs. United States; 2009 vs. Finland; 2009 vs. Slovakia; 2010 vs. Finland
World Junior Championships Tournament All Star Team	2009

=== Professional ===
Award	Year
KHL Rookie of the Week	Week of November 22, 2009
KHL Best Newcomer of the Month	November 2009

Awards and achievements
Preceded by Jakub Voracek	Columbus Blue Jackets first-round draft pick 2008	Succeeded by John Moore
