= Roberts Jekimovs =

Latvian ice hockey player

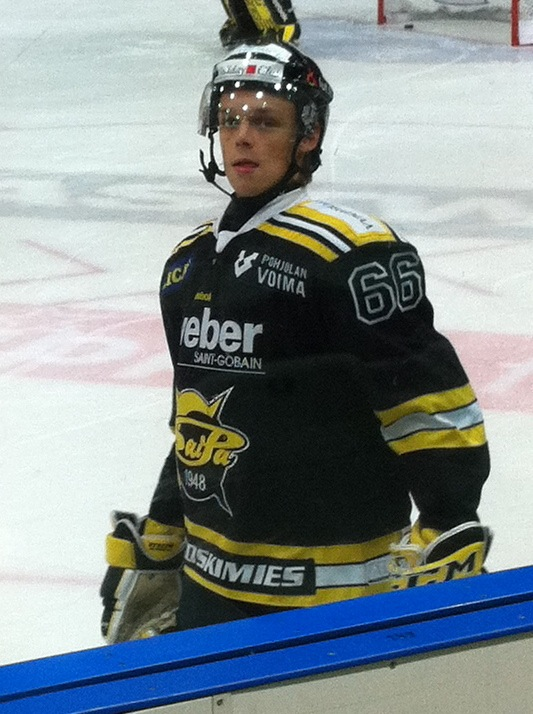
- Born: November 11, 1989 (age 36) Riga, Latvian SSR, Soviet Union
- Height: 5 ft 11 in (180 cm)
- Weight: 165 lb (75 kg; 11 st 11 lb)
- Position: Winger
- Shoots: Left
- Latvia team Former teams: Prizma Riga; SK Riga 20; SK LSPA/Riga; Dinamo-Juniors Riga; Kiekko-Pojat; SaiPa; Ilves; Graz 99ers Atlant Moscow Oblast; Gentofte Stars; Herning Blue Fox; Frederikshavn White Hawks; Rapaces de Gap; Remparts de Tours; HK Zemgale/LBTU; HK Kurbads
- National team: Latvia
- NHL draft: Undrafted
- Playing career: 2005–present

Roberts Jekimovs (born November 11, 1989, in Riga, Latvian SSR, Soviet Union) is a Latvian professional ice hockey forward who plays for Prizma Riga of the Latvian Hockey Higher League.

== Playing career ==
Jekimovs began playing in his native Latvia, playing for SK Riga 20 and SK LSPA/Riga from 2005 to 2008. He then spent a year playing in Sweden for Brynäs IF's J20 team in SuperElit before splitting the 2009–10 season with Dinamo-Juniors Riga in the Belarusian Extraleague and for Jokipojat of Mestis in Finland.

In 2011, Jekimovs signed with SaiPa of the SM-liiga where he managed 7 goals and 13 assists in 43 games. He was re-signed for a second season with SaiPa the following year and improved his scoring from the previous season, notching up 16 goals in 54 games. On April 17, 2013, he joined Ilves but was not able to recapture the same level of form he achieved while at SaiPa, scoring just 5 goals and 6 assists in 39 games, and was briefly loaned out to Mestis club Lempäälän Kisa.

On September 25, 2014, Jekimovs agreed to a try-out contract with Austrian club, Graz 99ers of the EBEL. After just 8 games with the 99ers, Jekimovs opted to sign a contract in the Kontinental Hockey League after his rights were traded from Dinamo Riga with Atlant Moscow Oblast on December 24, 2014. He would however only feature in two games for the team.

On September 1, 2015, Jekimovs returned to Latvia to sign for Prizma Riga but played just two games before leaving to join Gentofte Stars of the Metal Ligaen in Denmark 14 days later. He would spend the next two seasons in Denmark, spending the 2016–17 season with the Herning Blue Fox and the 2017–18 season with the Frederikshavn White Hawks.

On August 30, 2018, Jekimovs moved to France and signed for Rapaces de Gap of the Ligue Magnus. He re-signed for a second season with the team in May 2019 but was released on December 13, 2019, and he signed a contract with Division 1 side Remparts de Tours on December 26.

== International career ==
Jekimovs made his debut for the Latvia men's national ice hockey team in 2009 and was a member of their 2009 IIHF World Championship squad, going pointless in four games. He would also play in the 2013 IIHF World Championship, where he played six games and scored one goal.

== Career statistics ==
=== Regular season and playoffs ===
			Regular season					Playoffs
Season	Team	League	GP	G	A	Pts	PIM	GP	G	A	Pts	PIM
2005–06	SK Riga 20	LHL	—	6	3	9	16	—	—	—	—	—
2006–07	SK Riga 20	LHL	48	14	12	26	22	—	—	—	—	—
2007–08	SK LSPA/Riga	LHL	45	19	34	53	42	—	—	—	—	—
2008–09	Brynäs IF	J20	38	10	11	21	45	7	0	0	0	2
2009–10	Dinamo-Juniors Riga	BXL	19	8	18	26	14	—	—	—	—	—
2009–10	Jokipojat	Mestis	5	3	3	6	2	9	3	3	6	0
2010–11	Jokipojat	Mestis	47	24	19	43	36	—	—	—	—	—
2011–12	SaiPa	SM-l	43	7	13	20	33	—	—	—	—	—
2012–13	SaiPa	SM-l	54	16	11	27	20	1	0	0	0	0
2013–14	Ilves	Liiga	39	5	6	11	4	—	—	—	—	—
2013–14	LeKi	Mestis	2	0	1	1	2	—	—	—	—	—
2014–15	Graz 99ers	EBEL	8	0	2	2	2	—	—	—	—	—
2014–15	Atlant Moscow Oblast	KHL	2	0	0	0	0	—	—	—	—	—
2015–16	Prizma Riga	LHL	2	3	2	5	4	—	—	—	—	—
2015–16	Gentofte Stars	ML	44	20	24	44	20	—	—	—	—	—
2016–17	Herning Blue Fox	ML	44	21	18	39	18	5	0	1	1	6
2017–18	Gentofte Stars	ML	44	14	18	32	12	4	0	3	3	2
2018–19	Rapaces de Gap	LM	36	9	17	26	34	10	3	3	6	6
2019–20	Rapaces de Gap	LM	22	0	4	4	6	—	—	—	—	—
2019–20	Remparts de Tours	Div 1	11	5	7	12	2	3	0	1	1	2
Liiga totals			136	28	30	58	57	1	0	0	0	0

=== International ===
Year	Team	Event	GP	G	A	Pts	PIM
2006	Latvia	WJC18-D1	5	0	2	2	2
2007	Latvia	WJC18	6	0	2	2	4
2007	Latvia	WJC	5	0	1	1	2
2008	Latvia	WJC-D1	5	3	5	8	2
2009	Latvia	WJC	6	4	3	7	0
2009	Latvia	WC	4	0	0	0	0
2013	Latvia	OGQ	3	0	2	2	0
2013	Latvia	WC	6	1	0	1	2
Junior totals			27	7	13	20	10
Senior totals			13	1	2	3	2
