= Jordan Schroeder =

American ice hockey player (born 1990)

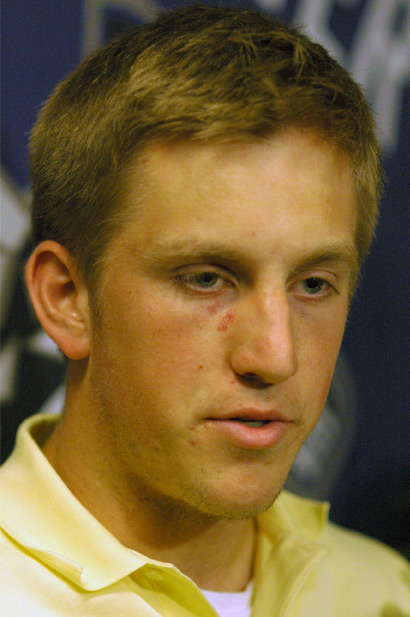
- Schroeder in 2009
- Born: September 29, 1990 (age 35) Lakeville, Minnesota, U.S.
- Height: 5 ft 9 in (175 cm)
- Weight: 184 lb (83 kg; 13 st 2 lb)
- Position: Center
- Shoots: Right
- team Former teams: Free agent Vancouver Canucks; Minnesota Wild; Columbus Blue Jackets; Torpedo Nizhny Novgorod; Jokerit; SC Rapperswil-Jona Lakers; Brynäs IF
- National team: United States
- NHL draft: 22nd overall, 2009; Vancouver Canucks
- Playing career: 2010–present

Jordan John Schroeder (born September 29, 1990) is an American professional ice hockey player. A center, he is currently an unrestricted free agent. He most recently played for Brynäs IF of the Swedish Hockey League (SHL).

Born and raised in Minnesota, Schroeder spent two seasons with the U.S. National Team Development Program before he joined the Minnesota Golden Gophers of the Western Collegiate Hockey Association (WCHA) for two seasons, being named WCHA Rookie of the Year in 2009. He has also played for the American national junior ice hockey team and appeared in three World Junior Championships, where he set records for most career assists and points by an American. Schroeder was ranked as the fifth best North American skater heading into the 2009 NHL entry draft, and was drafted 22nd overall by the Vancouver Canucks after concerns about his size led to several teams to pass on him. Schroeder then spent several years playing with the Canucks minor league affiliates in the American Hockey League (AHL) before joining the Canucks of the National Hockey League (NHL) in 2013. He played parts of two seasons with the Canucks, who decided not to re-sign Schroeder in 2014; he then joined the Minnesota Wild.

== Personal life ==
Jordan grew up in Prior Lake, Minnesota, with parents John and Deb Schroeder, and moved to nearby Lakeville, a suburb of Minneapolis-Saint Paul, when he was thirteen. John played several sports, including basketball, football and baseball while Deb was a gymnast and a cross-country runner. Schroeder is the oldest of three siblings; brother Zach is two years younger and sister Elly is six years younger; both of them also play hockey. He first played hockey at the age of four; his first organized team was called the Lakeville Ponys which was intended as a learn to skate program but at the recommendation of his coach Scott Cummings, he was moved up to the Mite program because his skill level was far ahead of the other kids his age. Schroeder spent two years at St. Thomas Academy in suburban Mendota Heights, Minnesota, before graduating with high honors from Ann Arbor Pioneer High School in Ann Arbor, Michigan. He accelerated his high school education in order to play NCAA hockey a year early and took courses online from Brigham Young University to do so. Schroeder signed a letter of intent to join the University of Minnesota in November 2007. He enrolled at the school in the fall of 2008, majoring in business and marketing education. In 2010, his final year at the school, Schroeder was named to the WCHA All-Academic team, the result of a 3.0 grade average over the previous two semesters.

== Playing career ==
=== Amateur career ===
Schroeder played high school hockey for St. Thomas Academy in Mendota Heights, Minnesota, where he played alongside Anders Lee. He helped the St. Thomas Cadets reach the Minnesota Class 1A hockey tournament in both 2005 and 2006, winning the high school championship in 2006. In 2006, he joined the U.S. National Team Development Program (USNTDP), located in Ann Arbor, where he spent two seasons. In his final season with the USNTDP, Schroeder led the team in scoring with 21 goals and 53 points in 55 games. Schroeder joined the University of Minnesota Golden Gophers of the Western Collegiate Hockey Association (WCHA), a team he grew up wanting to play for, in 2008–09. Upon joining the Golden Gophers, Schroeder was the youngest player on the team. He scored 13 goals and 32 assists in 32 games in his freshman year, the second highest total on the team, and was named WCHA Rookie of the Year. Schroeder was one of the top-ranked prospects for the 2009 NHL entry draft, ranked fifth overall among North American skaters by NHL Central Scouting and was selected twenty-second overall by the Vancouver Canucks. His drop in the draft has been attributed to his small stature and his play at the end of the 2009 World Junior Championships.

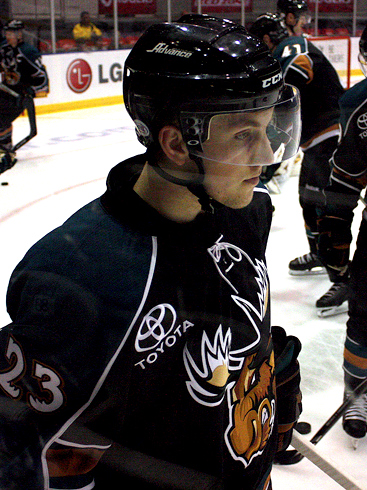
Schroeder while a member of the Manitoba Moose in 2010

Prior to the start of the 2009–10 season, it was reported that Schroeder intended to leave the University of Minnesota and join the Everett Silvertips, a team in the major junior Western Hockey League. This was denied by Schroeder, who wanted to spend at least another year with the Golden Gophers. The Golden Gophers finished the season with a losing record, the first time they had done so in more than 10 years, and lost in the first round of the playoffs, the second time in the past 33 years that had happened. Schroeder finished with 9 goals and 28 points in 37 games, tied for the team lead in points, the lowest for the team's leading scorer since 1962.

=== Professional career ===
On March 17, 2010, Schroeder signed a contract with the Canucks and was assigned to their American Hockey League affiliate, the Manitoba Moose. Similar to other National Hockey League entry-level contracts, Schroeder's contract was for three years; he would make US$900,000 per year while in the NHL, or $65,000 to $70,000 per year to play in the minor leagues, with a signing bonus of $270,000. In his first professional game on March 21, 2010, against the Grand Rapids Griffins, Schroeder scored two goals, including the game-winning goal, as the Moose defeated the Griffins, 4–0. He played eleven games in the regular season for the Moose and scored four goals and five assists as the team advanced to the playoffs. In the third game of the opening-round playoff series against the Hamilton Bulldogs on April 19, 2010, Schroeder scored his first professional hat trick (three goals in a game), and the first hat trick by a Moose player during the season, as the Moose won their first game of the playoffs, 7–2. Schroeder played in all six of the Moose's playoff games and registered three goals and three assists. As he was signed after the NHL trade deadline, Schroeder was not eligible to join the Canucks for the NHL playoffs.

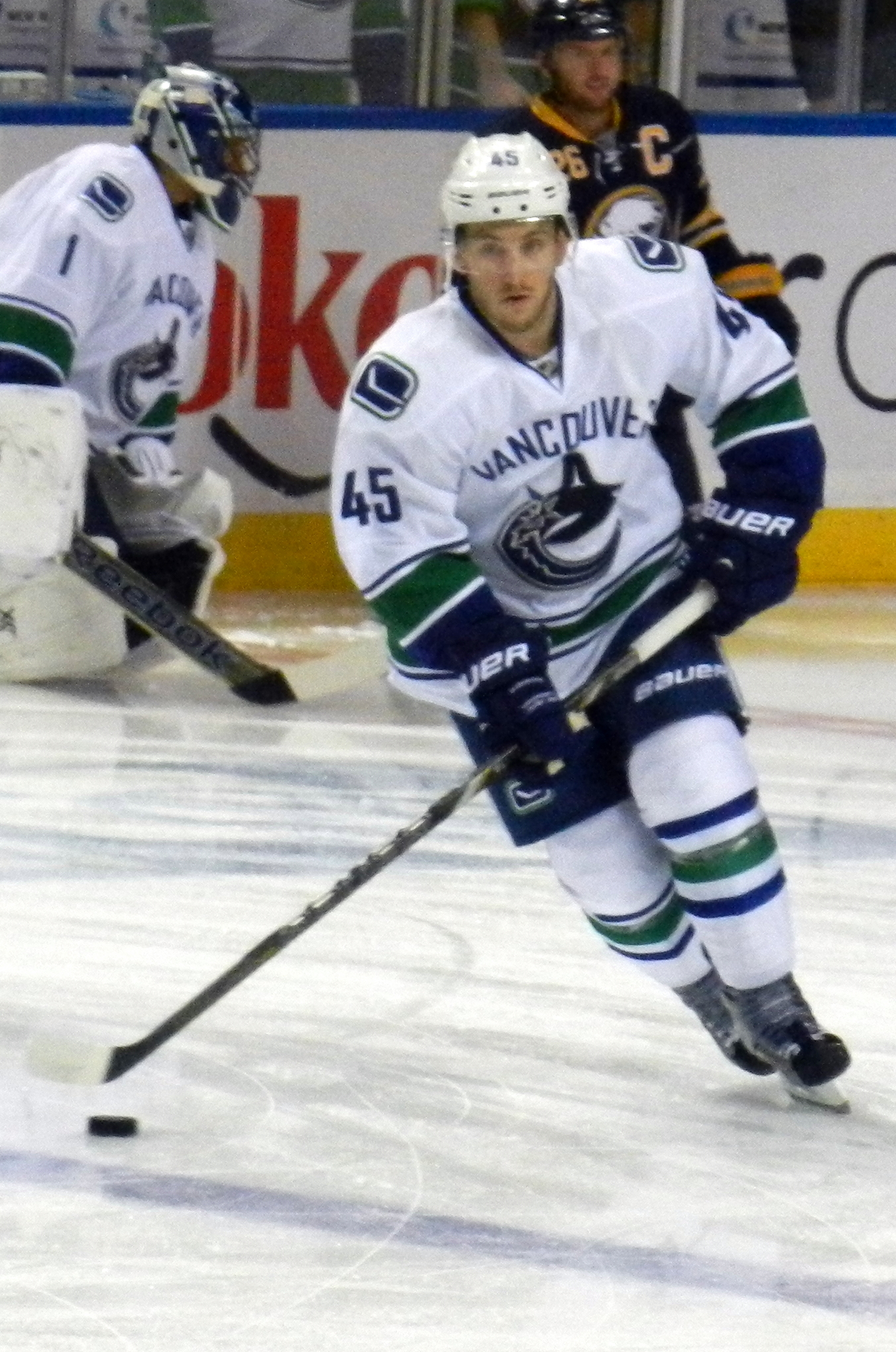
Schroeder during warm-ups with the Vancouver Canucks during the 2013–14 season

After attending his first professional training camp with the Canucks, he was reassigned to the Moose on September 27, 2011. Playing the first game of the season on October 8 against the Peoria Rivermen, Schroeder recorded three assists in a 4–3 win. Two months later, during a game against the Oklahoma City Barons on December 10, Schroeder was involved in a collision of several players and left the game with a high ankle sprain. Fourth on the team in scoring at the time of the injury, with five goals and eight assists, Schroeder missed 16 games and returned to the Moose on January 20, 2011 against the Abbotsford Heat. He finished his professional rookie season with 28 points (10 goals and 18 assists) over 61 games, while adding 6 points (1 goal and 5 assists) in 11 post-season games.

During the off-season, the Moose franchise was relocated to St. John's, Newfoundland due to the Winnipeg Jets' return to the NHL, forcing the team out of the Winnipeg market. As a result, the Canucks began a new AHL affiliation, moving Schroeder to the Chicago Wolves for the 2011–12 season. He scored his first goal with the Wolves on October 14, 2011, in a 4–2 loss to the Milwaukee Admirals. He finished the 2011-12 season third on the Wolves with 21 goals and 44 points.

The 2012–13 NHL lockout ensured that Schroeder started the 2012-13 season with the Wolves. Schroeder played in 30 games with the Wolves, scoring nine goals and ten assists. When the lockout ended in January 2013 he was initially sent back to Chicago, but after the Canucks played two games he was recalled to join the team. He made his NHL debut January 23, 2013 against the Calgary Flames. Schroeder recorded his first point, an assist, on January 25 against the Anaheim Ducks, his second NHL game. He then scored the winning shootout goal in his sixth game, the Canucks 2–1 victory over the Chicago Blackhawks on February 1. In his ninth game, February 9 against Calgary, Schroeder scored his first two goals in the NHL; both came against Leland Irving, with the first one being the game winning goal.

Schroeder spent the summer prior to the 2013–14 season recovering from shoulder surgery. He then fractured his left ankle in the Canucks first preseason game of the year. By mid-October Schroeder returned to the Canucks; however he only played three games before once again fracturing his left ankle; surgery was required after this injury, keeping him out until January 2014. Prior to rejoining the Canucks, Schroeder played two games with their AHL affiliate, the Utica Comets, recording one assist. He would ultimately play 25 games with Vancouver during the season, recording six points. The Canucks did not tender Schroeder a qualifying offer when the season ended, making him an unrestricted free agent. He was then signed to a two-year, two-way contract by the Minnesota Wild on July 11.

At the completion of his contract following the 2016–17 season, Schroeder as a restricted free agent was not to be tendered a new contract with the Wild. Approaching his free agent status, Schroeder was traded by the Wild to the Columbus Blue Jackets in exchange for Dante Salituro on June 23, 2017. He was later signed by the Blue Jackets to avoid free agency with a two-year contract on June 27, 2017. In the 2017–18 season, Schroeder appeared in 21 games with the Blue Jackets for 1 goal and 1 assist. In clearing waivers throughout the season, he was also assigned to add a veteran presence with AHL affiliate, the Cleveland Monsters, posting 36 points in 48 games.

On June 27, 2018, Schroeder was traded by the Blue Jackets to the Chicago Blackhawks in exchange for goaltender Jean-Francois Berube. Schroeder played out the 2018–19 season, exclusively with the Blackhawks AHL affiliate, the Rockford IceHogs. He led the team in scoring with 19 goals and 45 points in 62 games.

As an impending free agent from the Blackhawks, Schroeder opted to sign his first contract abroad, agreeing to a one-year contract with Russian outfit, Torpedo Nizhny Novgorod of the KHL, on May 17, 2019.

It was announced on May 6, 2020 that Schroeder has signed a two-year contract with the Helsinki based KHL team Jokerit.

Schroeder played two seasons with Jokerit before the team withdrew from the KHL during the 2021–22 season due to the Russian invasion of Ukraine. As a free agent in the off-season, Schroeder moved to the Swiss National League, in signing a two-year contract with SC Rapperswil-Jona Lakers on May 6, 2022. After two very poor seasons from Schroeder, he was released by the Lakers in the summer of 2024. He eventually joined Brynäs IF of the Swedish Hockey League (SHL) on a one-year deal.

== International play ==
Medal record

Ice hockey

Representing United States

World Junior Championships
Gold medal – first place	2010 Canada	

World Junior U18 Championships
Bronze medal – third place	2008 Russia	
Silver medal – second place	2007 Finland	

Schroeder debuted with the American junior national team internationally at the 2007 IIHF World U18 Championships in Finland. He helped the United States to a silver medal as he finished third in tournament scoring with 11 points, behind American teammates Colin Wilson and James van Riemsdyk.

The following year, Schroeder was named to the under-20 team, the youngest on the team at 17, for the 2008 World Junior Championships in the Czech Republic. He finished second in team scoring and tied for fourth in the tournament behind van Riemsdyk with one goal and seven assists for eight points in seven games. Three months later, Schroeder made his second U18 tournament appearance. Named the player of the game in the American's match against Sweden, he recorded five points in seven games as the Americans earned a bronze medal.

At the 2009 World Junior Championships in Canada, Schroeder established the American record for most career assists at the tournament with 15. The youngest player on the team, Schroeder was named the player of the game in a match against the Czech Republic, and led the Americans in scoring with 11 points.

On December 23, 2009, Schroeder was named to the American team for the 2010 World Junior Ice Hockey Championships, his third straight appearance at the World Junior Championships. The only player on the American team to play in two previous World Junior tournaments, Schroeder was also the first player from the University of Minnesota to participate in three tournaments. In a quarter-final match against Finland Schroeder notched three assists, including his 26th career point in the tournament, which surpassed Jeremy Roenick for the highest career total for an American. His 20 career assists was the third highest total in the history of the tournament. In the gold-medal game against Canada, Schroeder led the American team in shots on goal with six, scoring a goal on one of them. He finished with three goals and five assists in seven games as the Americans won the gold medal.

== Career statistics ==
=== Regular season and playoffs ===
			Regular season					Playoffs
Season	Team	League	GP	G	A	Pts	PIM	GP	G	A	Pts	PIM
2005–06	Saint Thomas Academy	MEC	31	27	35	62	—	—	—	—	—	—
2006–07	U.S. NTDP U18	NAHL	31	12	11	23	10	—	—	—	—	—
2006–07	U.S. NTDP U17	USDP	8	2	8	10	2	—	—	—	—	—
2006–07	U.S. NTDP U18	USDP	17	6	13	19	4	—	—	—	—	—
2007–08	U.S. NTDP U18	NAHL	14	1	8	9	4	—	—	—	—	—
2007–08	U.S. NTDP U18	USDP	41	21	23	44	12	—	—	—	—	—
2008–09	University of Minnesota	WCHA	35	13	32	45	29	—	—	—	—	—
2009–10	University of Minnesota	WCHA	37	9	19	28	14	—	—	—	—	—
2009–10	Manitoba Moose	AHL	11	4	5	9	0	6	3	3	6	4
2010–11	Manitoba Moose	AHL	61	10	18	28	10	11	1	5	6	2
2011–12	Chicago Wolves	AHL	76	21	23	44	18	5	1	1	2	1
2012–13	Chicago Wolves	AHL	42	12	21	33	14	—	—	—	—	—
2012–13	Vancouver Canucks	NHL	31	3	6	9	4	—	—	—	—	—
2013–14	Vancouver Canucks	NHL	25	3	3	6	2	—	—	—	—	—
2013–14	Utica Comets	AHL	2	0	1	1	2	—	—	—	—	—
2014–15	Iowa Wild	AHL	35	10	18	28	10	—	—	—	—	—
2014–15	Minnesota Wild	NHL	25	3	5	8	2	3	0	0	0	0
2015–16	Iowa Wild	AHL	40	14	20	34	12	—	—	—	—	—
2015–16	Minnesota Wild	NHL	26	2	2	4	2	2	1	0	1	0
2016–17	Iowa Wild	AHL	25	6	12	18	12	—	—	—	—	—
2016–17	Minnesota Wild	NHL	37	6	7	13	0	—	—	—	—	—
2017–18	Cleveland Monsters	AHL	48	14	22	36	14	—	—	—	—	—
2017–18	Columbus Blue Jackets	NHL	21	1	1	2	4	—	—	—	—	—
2018–19	Rockford IceHogs	AHL	62	19	26	45	10	—	—	—	—	—
2019–20	Torpedo Nizhny Novgorod	KHL	60	19	22	41	18	4	1	0	1	0
2020–21	Jokerit	KHL	50	18	17	35	14	4	0	1	1	0
2021–22	Jokerit	KHL	36	11	18	29	16	—	—	—	—	—
2022–23	SC Rapperswil-Jona Lakers	NL	41	10	18	28	10	2	0	2	2	0
2023–24	SC Rapperswil-Jona Lakers	NL	48	3	18	21	10	—	—	—	—	—
2024–25	Brynäs IF	SHL	46	7	14	21	10	17	4	3	7	0
NHL totals			165	18	24	42	14	5	1	0	1	0
KHL totals			146	48	57	105	48	8	1	1	2	0
NL totals			89	13	36	49	20	2	0	2	2	0

=== International ===
Year	Team	Event	Result	GP	G	A	Pts	PIM
2007	United States	U18	2nd place, silver medalist(s)	7	4	7	11	0
2008	United States	WJC	4th	6	1	7	8	2
2008	United States	U18	3rd place, bronze medalist(s)	7	3	2	5	2
2009	United States	WJC	5th	6	3	8	11	2
2010	United States	WJC	1st place, gold medalist(s)	7	3	5	8	2
2016	United States	WC	4th	9	0	1	1	0
Junior totals				33	14	29	43	8
Senior totals				9	0	1	1	0

== Awards ==
=== NCAA ===
Award	Year
WCHA Rookie of the Year	2009
All-WCHA Second Team	2009
WCHA Rookie Team	2009
WCHA All-Academic Team	2010

=== Minnesota Golden Gophers team awards ===
Award	Year
Rookie of the Year	2009

=== International ===
Award	Year
2008 IIHF World U18 Championships Player of the Game	Match vs. Sweden
2009 World Junior Championships Player of the Game	Match vs. Czech Republic

Awards and achievements
Preceded by Richard Bachman	WCHA Rookie of the Year; 2008–09	Succeeded by Danny Kristo
Sporting positions
Preceded by Cody Hodgson	Vancouver Canucks first-round draft pick 2009	Succeeded by Nicklas Jensen
