= Maxim Goncharov =

Russian ice hockey player (born 1989)

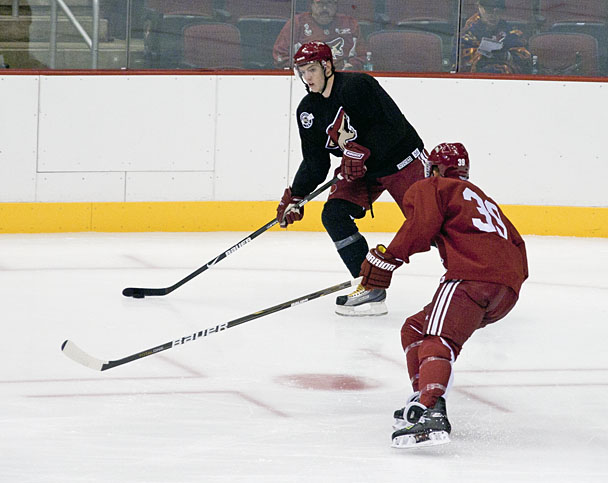
- Born: June 15, 1989 (age 37) Moscow, Russian SFSR, Soviet Union
- Height: 6 ft 3 in (191 cm)
- Weight: 193 lb (88 kg; 13 st 11 lb)
- Position: Defence
- Shoots: Right
- KHL team Former teams: Free agent CSKA Moscow; San Antonio Rampage; Portland Pirates; Avangard Omsk; Salavat Yulaev Ufa; Spartak Moscow; Sibir Novosibirsk; Neftekhimik Nizhnekamsk
- NHL draft: 123rd overall, 2007; Phoenix Coyotes
- Playing career: 2006–present

Maxim Alexandrovich Goncharov (Russian: Максим Александрович Гончаров; born June 15, 1989) is a Russian professional ice hockey defenceman. He is currently an unrestricted free agent, having last played for HC Neftekhimik Nizhnekamsk in the Kontinental Hockey League (KHL). Selected 123rd overall by the Phoenix Coyotes in the 2007 NHL entry draft, Goncharov spent part of his career playing in the American Hockey League (AHL) with the Coyotes' affiliate from 2010 to 2013.

== Playing career ==
After completing three seasons with Salavat Yulaev Ufa, Goncharov became a free agent after the 2017–18 season. Seeking a new opportunity to further his professional career, he signed a one-year contract with HC Spartak Moscow on May 8, 2018.

In his third year with Spartak Moscow during the 2020–21 season, Goncharov experienced a diminished role within the team, seeing limited ice time and failing to register any points over just 8 regular-season appearances. With opportunities scarce at the top level, Spartak opted to reassign Goncharov to their affiliate club, Khimik Voskresensk, in the Supreme Hockey League (VHL), Russia's second-tier professional league, to keep him playing regularly. Following his stint in the VHL, Goncharov and Spartak mutually agreed to part ways. Looking to revive his KHL career, he returned to Avangard Omsk, the team where he had played earlier in his career. Initially joining Avangard on a professional try-out contract, Goncharov impressed the coaching staff enough to secure a prorated one-year deal with the club on December 7, 2020.

Before the 2022–23 season, Goncharov joined Neftekhimik Nizhnekamsk as a free agent, agreeing to a one-year contract on August 30, 2022. Bringing veteran experience to the defense, he played in 40 regular season games, contributing 4 goals and 7 points. During the playoffs, he went without a point in five appearances as the team was eliminated in the quarterfinals by Ak Bars Kazan.

== Career statistics ==
=== Regular season and playoffs ===
			Regular season					Playoffs
Season	Team	League	GP	G	A	Pts	PIM	GP	G	A	Pts	PIM
2004–05	CSKA–2 Moscow	RUS.3	6	0	0	0	0	—	—	—	—	—
2005–06	CSKA–2 Moscow	RUS.3	31	2	0	2	10	—	—	—	—	—
2006–07	CSKA Moscow	RSL	18	0	0	0	10	5	0	0	0	2
2006–07	CSKA–2 Moscow	RUS.3	22	2	3	5	24	—	—	—	—	—
2007–08	CSKA Moscow	RSL	47	3	3	6	38	6	0	2	2	0
2007–08	CSKA–2 Moscow	RUS.3	4	0	2	2	35	3	0	0	0	8
2008–09	CSKA Moscow	KHL	47	7	8	15	50	7	0	0	0	4
2008–09	CSKA–2 Moscow	RUS.3	—	—	—	—	—	6	0	1	1	0
2009–10	CSKA Moscow	KHL	51	4	13	17	52	3	1	0	1	2
2010–11	San Antonio Rampage	AHL	61	6	9	15	65	—	—	—	—	—
2011–12	Portland Pirates	AHL	45	1	3	4	37	—	—	—	—	—
2012–13	Portland Pirates	AHL	45	2	13	15	114	1	0	0	0	4
2013–14	CSKA Moscow	KHL	21	3	4	7	24	—	—	—	—	—
2013–14	Avangard Omsk	KHL	27	3	3	6	100	—	—	—	—	—
2014–15	Avangard Omsk	KHL	15	1	0	1	16	12	0	1	1	29
2015–16	Avangard Omsk	KHL	3	0	0	0	6	—	—	—	—	—
2015–16	Salavat Yulaev Ufa	KHL	47	3	8	11	61	18	2	2	4	69
2016–17	Salavat Yulaev Ufa	KHL	50	1	8	9	114	4	0	0	0	6
2017–18	Salavat Yulaev Ufa	KHL	35	2	3	5	40	13	1	0	1	16
2018–19	Spartak Moscow	KHL	42	0	6	6	42	6	0	0	0	11
2019–20	Spartak Moscow	KHL	51	5	7	12	91	2	0	0	0	29
2020–21	Spartak Moscow	KHL	8	0	0	0	6	—	—	—	—	—
2020–21	Khimik Voskresensk	VHL	5	0	1	1	6	—	—	—	—	—
2020–21	Avangard Omsk	KHL	19	0	1	1	8	8	0	0	0	2
2021–22	Avangard Omsk	KHL	10	1	0	1	7	—	—	—	—	—
2021–22	Sibir Novosibirsk	KHL	1	0	0	0	0	—	—	—	—	—
2022–23	Neftekhimik Nizhnekamsk	KHL	40	4	3	7	12	5	0	0	0	7
2025–26	Dubai Red Stars	UAE	5	0	3	3	2	—	—	—	—	—
KHL totals			467	34	64	98	629	78	4	3	7	168

=== International ===
Year	Team	Event	Result	GP	G	A	Pts	PIM
2007	Russia	WJC18	1st place, gold medalist(s)	7	0	0	0	6
2009	Russia	WJC	3rd place, bronze medalist(s)	7	5	1	6	12
Junior totals				14	5	1	6	18

== Awards and honours ==
Award	Year
KHL
Gagarin Cup (Avangard Omsk)	2021
