= Joakim Andersson =

Swedish ice hockey player (born 1989)

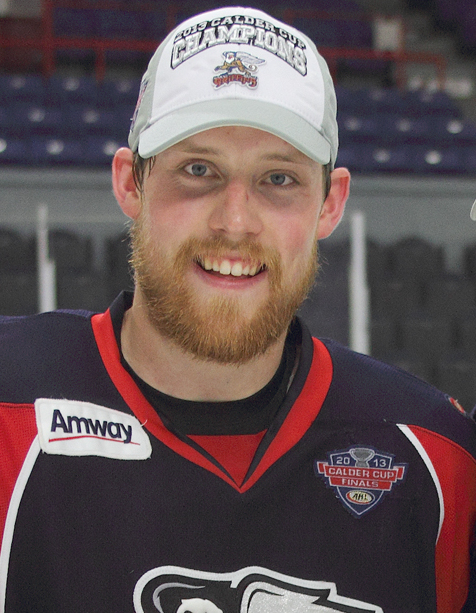
- Andersson with the Grand Rapids Griffins in 2013
- Born: 5 February 1989 (age 37) Munkedal, Sweden
- Height: 6 ft 2 in (188 cm)
- Weight: 206 lb (93 kg; 14 st 10 lb)
- Position: Centre
- Shot: Left
- Played for: Frölunda HC; Detroit Red Wings; Örebro HK; HV71
- NHL draft: 88th overall, 2007; Detroit Red Wings
- Playing career: 2007–2020

Joakim Anders Andersson (born 5 February 1989) is a Swedish former professional ice hockey centre who played in the for Swedish Hockey League (SHL) and with the Detroit Red Wings in the National Hockey League (NHL). Andersson was drafted 88th overall by the Red Wings in the 2007 NHL entry draft.

== Playing career ==
Andersson is a product of Munkedals BK. In 2005, he joined the youth ranks of Frölunda HC and made his debut in Sweden's top-tier SHL with Frölunda's men's team during the 2006–07 season.

He moved to North America prior to the 2010–11 campaign. Andersson played over two full seasons for the Grand Rapids Griffins of the American Hockey League. He had 10 goals and 17 assists in 36 games in the 2012–13 season, when he was promoted to the NHL.

Andersson was recalled from Grand Rapids by the Detroit Red Wings in February 2013. He scored his first NHL goal on 15 February 2013, against Viktor Fasth of the Anaheim Ducks.

On 6 August 2013, the Red Wings re-signed Andersson to a two-year, $1.465 million contract. On 26 June 2015, the Red Wings re-signed Andersson to a one-year, $815,000 contract.

On 22 January 2016, Andersson was placed on waivers by the Red Wings, and later assigned to the Grand Rapids Griffins on 24 January. He was recalled by the Red Wings on 26 January. On 12 February, Andersson was assigned to the Griffins. On 8 April, Andersson was recalled by the Detroit Red Wings.

On 30 April 2016, Andersson signed a two-year contract with Örebro HK of the Swedish Hockey League (SHL). He later moved to HV71 on 17 April 2018, securing a two-year contract.

At the conclusion of his contract with HV71, Andersson initially signed with KooKoo of the Finnish Liiga, however was unable to pass a physical. He later announced his retirement from professional hockey after thirteen professional seasons on 14 December 2020.

== International play ==
Medal record

Representing Sweden

Ice hockey

World Junior Championships
Silver medal – second place	2009 Ottawa	
Silver medal – second place	2008 Pardubice	

World U18 Championships
Bronze medal – third place	2007 Tampere	

Andersson is the all-time junior international games played leader for Sweden. He has played in four major international tournaments, his first being the 2006 IIHF World U18 Championships. The following year Andersson helped Sweden win a bronze medal at the 2007 IIHF World U18 Championships. At the 2008 World Junior Ice Hockey Championships Andersson helped Sweden to a silver medal, with six assists in six games he was tied for third in the tournament assist leaders.

The following year at the 2009 World Junior Ice Hockey Championships, Andersson was an alternate captain, totaling three goals and three assists while centering Sweden's successful second line with wingers Magnus Pääjärvi-Svensson and Simon Hjalmarsson.

== Career statistics ==
=== Regular season and playoffs ===
			Regular season					Playoffs
Season	Team	League	GP	G	A	Pts	PIM	GP	G	A	Pts	PIM
2005–06	Frölunda HC	J18 Allsv	1	0	0	0	0	2	0	1	1	0
2005–06	Frölunda HC	J20	35	9	11	20	10	7	2	5	7	4
2006–07	Frölunda HC	J18 Allsv	2	1	2	3	2	6	3	2	5	28
2006–07	Frölunda HC	J20	41	20	26	46	60	8	0	7	7	4
2006–07	Frölunda HC	SEL	1	0	0	0	0	—	—	—	—	—
2006–07	Kungälvs IK	Div.1	2	0	0	0	2	—	—	—	—	—
2007–08	Borås HC	Allsv	33	6	17	23	26	—	—	—	—	—
2007–08	Frölunda HC	J20	6	8	2	10	30	5	6	3	9	4
2007–08	Frölunda HC	SEL	9	1	0	1	2	4	1	1	2	0
2008–09	Borås HC	Allsv	4	2	2	4	2	—	—	—	—	—
2008–09	Frölunda HC	SEL	49	6	6	12	22	11	0	0	0	4
2008–09	Grand Rapids Griffins	AHL	1	0	1	1	2	10	1	2	3	4
2009–10	Frölunda HC	SEL	55	6	12	18	42	7	1	2	3	0
2010–11	Grand Rapids Griffins	AHL	79	7	15	22	30	—	—	—	—	—
2011–12	Grand Rapids Griffins	AHL	73	21	30	51	34	—	—	—	—	—
2011–12	Detroit Red Wings	NHL	5	0	0	0	0	—	—	—	—	—
2012–13	Grand Rapids Griffins	AHL	36	10	17	27	55	10	3	5	8	0
2012–13	Detroit Red Wings	NHL	38	3	5	8	8	14	1	4	5	10
2013–14	Detroit Red Wings	NHL	65	8	9	17	12	1	0	0	0	0
2014–15	Detroit Red Wings	NHL	68	3	5	8	22	7	1	1	2	2
2015–16	Grand Rapids Griffins	AHL	19	3	2	5	2	—	—	—	—	—
2015–16	Detroit Red Wings	NHL	29	1	2	3	6	5	0	1	1	2
2017–18	Örebro HK	SHL	39	8	7	15	12	—	—	—	—	—
2018–19	HV71	SHL	51	5	20	25	26	7	1	2	3	8
2019–20	HV71	SHL	49	9	7	16	41	—	—	—	—	—
SHL totals			253	35	52	87	145	29	3	5	8	12
NHL totals			205	15	21	36	48	27	2	6	8	14

=== International ===
Year	Team	Event	Result	GP	G	A	Pts	PIM
2006	Sweden	U18	6th	6	0	0	0	4
2007	Sweden	U18	3rd place, bronze medalist(s)	6	0	1	1	4
2008	Sweden	WJC	2nd place, silver medalist(s)	6	0	6	6	2
2009	Sweden	WJC	2nd place, silver medalist(s)	6	2	4	6	6
Junior totals				24	2	11	13	16
