= Steven Rupprich =

German ice hockey player

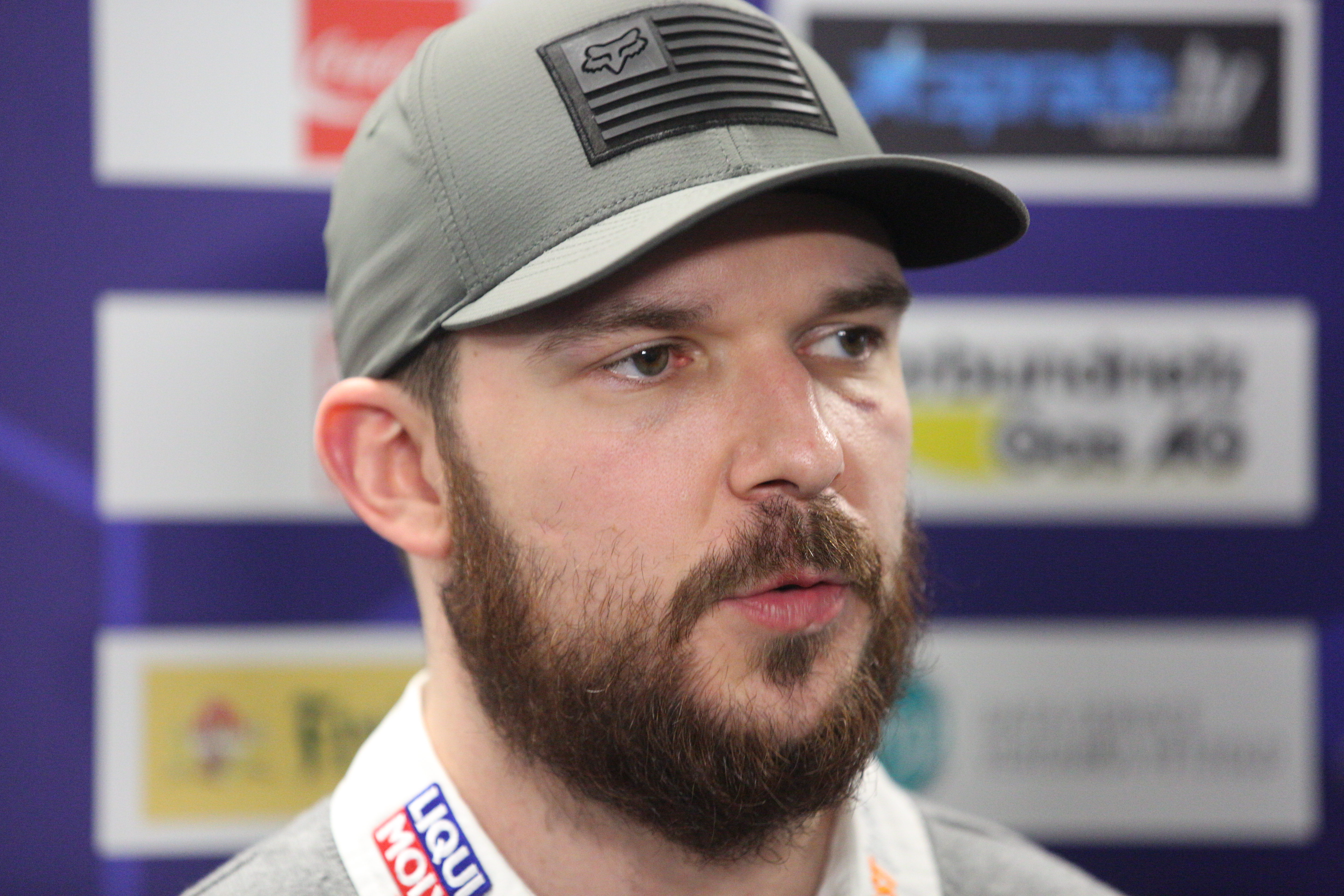
- Born: April 15, 1989 (age 36) Berlin, Germany
- Height: 6 ft 0 in (183 cm)
- Weight: 190 lb (86 kg; 13 st 8 lb)
- Position: Left wing
- Shoots: Left
- DEL2 team Former teams: Dresdner Eislöwen; Iserlohn Roosters; Thomas Sabo Ice Tigers
- NHL draft: Undrafted
- Playing career: 2009–present

Steven Rupprich (born April 15, 1989) is a German professional ice hockey player. He is currently playing for Dresdner Eislöwen in DEL2, the second-tier league in Germany. He joined the Eislowen from the Thomas Sabo Ice Tigers in the Deutsche Eishockey Liga (DEL).

Rupprich attempted to join the National Hockey League via the 2009 NHL Draft in Montreal but was undrafted. Because of this, he returned to Germany and started playing for Iserlohn.
