= Roman Szturc =

Czech ice hockey player

- Born: 25 September 1989 (age 35); Karviná, Czechoslovakia
- Height: 6 ft 1 in (185 cm)
- Weight: 185 lb (84 kg; 13 st 3 lb)
- Position: Forward
- Shoots: Right
- team Former teams: Free agent HC Vítkovice Ridera
- Playing career: 2007–present

Roman Szturc (born 25 September 1989) is a Czech professional ice hockey player who is currently a free agent. He played with HC Vítkovice Ridera in the Czech Extraliga from 2007 until 2019.
