= Igor Golovkov =

Russian ice hockey player

- Born: May 17, 1990 (age 35); Moscow, Russian SFSR
- Height: 6 ft 3 in (191 cm)
- Weight: 209 lb (95 kg; 14 st 13 lb)
- Position: Defence
- Shot: Left
- Played for: Dyanmo Moscow; HC Vityaz
- NHL draft: Undrafted
- Playing career: 2008–2025

Igor Golovkov (born May 17, 1990) is a Russian former professional ice hockey defenceman who played for HC Dynamo Moscow and HC Vityaz in the Kontinental Hockey League (KHL).
