= Nestori Lähde =

Finnish ice hockey player

- Born: 12 August 1989 (age 35); Nokia, Finland
- Height: 182 cm (6 ft 0 in)
- Weight: 93 kg (205 lb; 14 st 9 lb)
- Position: Forward
- Shoots: Left
- Liiga team Former teams: Lukko; Tappara; HC TPS
- Playing career: 2008–present

Nestori Lähde (born 12 August 1989) is a Finnish ice hockey player currently playing for Lukko of the Finnish Liiga.
