= Ondrej Rusnák =

Slovak ice hockey player

- Born: February 25, 1989 (age 36) Bratislava, Czechoslovakia
- Height: 6 ft 3 in (191 cm)
- Weight: 185 lb (84 kg; 13 st 3 lb)
- Position: Centre
- Shot: Left
- Played for: HC Slovan Bratislava; HK Dukla Trenčín; MsHK Žilina; Cracovia Kraków; HK Poprad; CSM Dunărea Galați; HSC Csíkszereda
- Playing career: 2007–2018

Ondrej Rusnák (born 25 February 1989, in Bratislava) is a Slovak retired professional ice hockey player. He is currently working as an assistant coach for ASC Corona Brașov of the Erste Liga.

Rusnák played in the Tipsport Liga for HC Slovan Bratislava, HC Dukla Trenčín, MsHK Žilina and HK Poprad.

He is a son of former Czechoslovak international Dárius Rusnák.
