= Maximilian Forster =

German professional ice hockey player

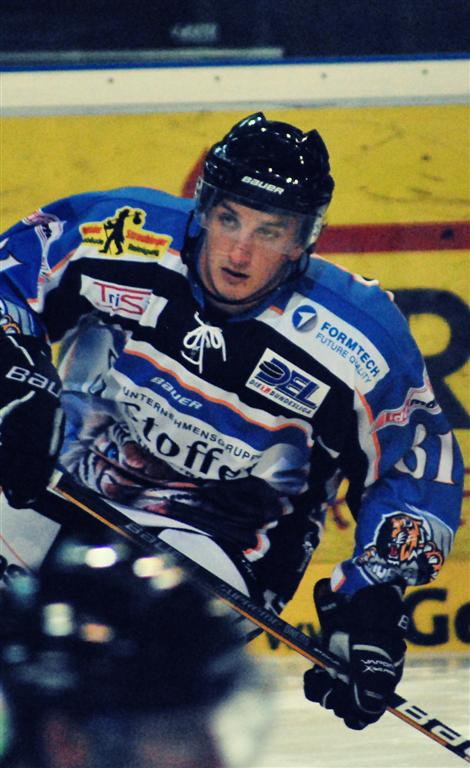
- Maximilian Forster
- Born: September 19, 1990 (age 34); Landshut, West Germany
- Height: 5 ft 11 in (180 cm)
- Weight: 179 lb (81 kg; 12 st 11 lb)
- Position: Left wing
- Shoots: Left
- DEL team: Straubing Tigers
- NHL draft: Undrafted
- Playing career: 2007–present

Maximilian Forster (born September 19, 1990) is a German professional ice hockey player. He is currently playing for Straubing Tigers in the Deutsche Eishockey Liga (DEL).
