= Jan Káňa (ice hockey, born 1990) =

Czech ice hockey player

- Born: March 22, 1990 (age 34); Ostrava, Czechoslovakia
- Height: 5 ft 9 in (175 cm)
- Weight: 179 lb (81 kg; 12 st 11 lb)
- Position: Forward
- Shoots: Right
- Czech 1. Liga team Former teams: HC RT Torax Poruba; HC Vítkovice
- Playing career: 2007–present

Jan Káňa (born March 22, 1990) is a Czech professional ice hockey forward who plays for HC RT Torax Poruba of the Czech 1. Liga. He is the younger brother of former Columbus Blue Jackets player Tomáš Káňa.

Káňa previously played 244 games in the Czech Extraliga with HC Vítkovice.
