= André Huebscher =

German ice hockey player

Andre Huebscher
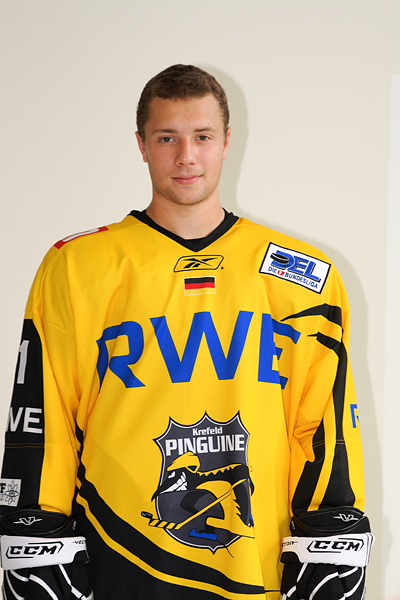
- Born: January 8, 1989 (age 36); Moers, West Germany
- Height: 6 ft 0 in (183 cm)
- Weight: 190 lb (86 kg; 13 st 8 lb)
- Position: Left wing
- Shoots: Left
- OLN team: Füchse Duisburg
- NHL draft: Undrafted
- Playing career: 2006–present

Andre Huebscher (born January 8, 1989) is a German professional ice hockey player who plays left wing.

He is currently playing for Füchse Duisburg in the DEB Oberliga Nord.
