= Radoslav Tybor =

Slovak ice hockey player

- Born: 23 November 1989 (age 35); Trenčín, Czechoslovakia
- Height: 6 ft 1 in (185 cm)
- Weight: 180 lb (82 kg; 12 st 12 lb)
- Position: Right wing
- Shoots: Left
- team Former teams: Free agent HK Dukla Trenčín; HK Orange 20; MHC Prievidza; HC Dynamo Pardubice; HC Oceláři Třinec; HC Vítkovice Ridera; HC Košice
- National team: Slovakia
- NHL draft: Undrafted
- Playing career: 2009–present

Radoslav Tybor (born 23 November 1989) is a Slovak ice hockey player. He is currently a free agent.

== Career ==
Tybor participated at the 2009 World Junior Ice Hockey Championships, recording three points in seven games. The Slovakia junior team finished fourth at the tournament. He debuted for the Slovakia senior team at the Deutschland Cup in 2011.

== Career statistics ==
=== Regular season and playoffs ===
			Regular season					Playoffs
Season	Team	League	GP	G	A	Pts	PIM	GP	G	A	Pts	PIM
2005–06	Dukla Trenčín	Slovak U18	29	2	1	3	2	—	—	—	—	—
2006–07	Dukla Trenčín	Slovak U18	57	49	29	78	32	—	—	—	—	—
2007–08	Dukla Trenčín	Slovak-Jr.	50	21	22	43	12	—	—	—	—	—
2008–09	Dukla Trenčín	Slovak-Jr.	20	23	22	45	10	—	—	—	—	—
2008–09	Dukla Trenčín	Slovak	16	2	4	6	0	3	0	0	0	0
2008–09	HK Orange 20	Slovak	17	5	3	8	6	—	—	—	—	—
2008–09	MHC Prievidza	Slovak.1	—	—	—	—	—	1	1	1	2	0
2009–10	Dukla Trenčín	Slovak	45	19	12	31	6	—	—	—	—	—
2010–11	Dukla Trenčín	Slovak	54	19	14	33	10	10	6	6	12	6
2011–12	Dukla Trenčín	Slovak	52	15	19	34	8	10	2	6	8	2
2012–13	Dukla Trenčín	Slovak	32	17	25	42	4	—	—	—	—	—
2012–13	HC ČSOB Pojišťovna Pardubice	Czech	11	2	1	3	2	4	0	2	2	0
2013–14	HC ČSOB Pojišťovna Pardubice	Czech	44	16	8	24	8	9	7	3	10	2
2014–15	HC ČSOB Pojišťovna Pardubice	Czech	50	15	27	42	22	9	2	4	6	2
2015–16	HC Dynamo Pardubice	Czech	17	2	4	6	14	—	—	—	—	—
2015–16	HC Oceláři Třinec	Czech	27	3	3	6	8	3	1	1	2	0
2016–17	HK Dukla Trenčín	Slovak	17	9	6	15	16	—	—	—	—	—
2016–17	HC Vítkovice Ridera	Czech	30	10	10	20	6	1	0	0	0	0
2017–18	HC Vítkovice Ridera	Czech	34	12	11	23	8	3	0	1	1	0
2018–19	HC Vítkovice Ridera	Czech	52	18	12	30	22	8	4	2	6	0
2019–20	HC Dynamo Pardubice	Czech	45	18	15	33	10	—	—	—	—	—
2020–21	HC Dynamo Pardubice	Czech	27	4	4	8	2	3	1	0	1	0
2021–22	HK Dukla Trenčín	Slovak	43	15	13	28	12	3	1	0	1	2
2022–23	HC Košice	Slovak	40	7	8	15	10	4	0	0	0	0
Czech totals			337	100	95	195	102	40	15	13	28	4
Slovak totals			316	108	104	212	72	30	9	12	21	10

=== International ===
Year	Team	Event	Result	GP	G	A	Pts	PIM
2009	Slovakia	WJC	4th	7	2	1	3	0
2014	Slovakia	WC	9th	4	0	0	0	2
Junior totals				7	2	1	3	0
Senior totals				4	0	0	0	2

== Awards and honors ==
Award	Year
Slovak
Champion	2023
