= 2008 IIHF World U18 Championships =

2008 IIHF World U18 Championship

Tournament details
- Host country: Russia
- Venues: 2 (in 1 host city)
- Dates: 13–23 April 2008
- Teams: 10

Final positions
- Champions: Canada (2nd title)
- Runners-up: Russia
- Third place: United States
- Fourth place: Sweden

Tournament statistics
- Games played: 31
- Goals scored: 221 (7.13 per game)
- Attendance: 66,839 (2,156 per game)
- Scoring leader(s): (Canada) Cody Hodgson (12 points)

Awards
- MVP: (Canada) Jake Allen

The 2008 IIHF World U18 Championships were held in Kazan, Russia. The championships began on April 13, 2008, and finished on April 23, 2008. Games were played at TatNeft Arena and Arena Kazan in Kazan. Canada defeated Russia 8–0 in the final to claim the gold medal, while the United States defeated Sweden 6–3 to capture the bronze medal.

== Top Division ==
=== Preliminary round ===
All times are local (UTC+3).

==== Group A ====
| Pos | Team | Pld | W | OTW | OTL | L | GF | GA | GD | Pts | Qualification |
|---|---|---|---|---|---|---|---|---|---|---|---|
| 1 | Russia (H) | 4 | 4 | 0 | 0 | 0 | 26 | 9 | +17 | 12 | Semifinals |
| 2 | Canada | 4 | 3 | 0 | 0 | 1 | 21 | 7 | +14 | 9 | Quarterfinals |
| 3 | Germany | 4 | 1 | 1 | 0 | 2 | 13 | 19 | −6 | 5 | Quarterfinals |
| 4 | Slovakia | 4 | 1 | 0 | 1 | 2 | 13 | 19 | −6 | 4 | Relegation round |
| 5 | Denmark | 4 | 0 | 0 | 0 | 4 | 4 | 23 | −19 | 0 | Relegation round |

Source: IIHF
(H) Host

| 13 April 2008; 13:00 | Canada | 9–2 (2–0, 4–1, 3–1) | Germany | Tatneft Arena, Kazan; Attendance: 1,100 |

Game reference

Jake Allen
Goalies
Philipp Grubauer
Referees:
(Finland) Tom Laaksonen
(United States) Robert Ritchie
Linesmen:
(Switzerland) Roger Arm
(United States) David Brown

| Nemisz (Hamonic, Cuma) – 10:47 | 1–0 |
| Hall (Eberle, Hodgson) (PP) – 15:50 | 2–0 |
| Eberle (Hall, Hogdson) (PP) – 25:29 | 3–0 |
| Deschamps (O'Dell, Lagacé) – 26:36 | 4–0 |
| | 4–1 | 29:49 – Pohl (Brueckner) (PP) |
| Myers (McMillan, Teubert)– 33:06 | 5–1 |
| O'Dell (Hamonic) – 33:40 | 6–1 |
| Deschamps (O'Dell, Lagacé) – 41:59 | 7–1 |
| Ellis (Hall, Cuma) (PP) 42:50 | 8–1 |
| | 8–2 | 53:47 – Weiss (Flaake, Kimmel) |
| Eberle (Hall, Hodgson) – 54:15 | 9–2 |

2 min
Penalties
16 min
54
Shots
15

| 13 April 2008; 17:00 | Slovakia | 4–6 (1–2, 0–1, 3–3) | Russia | Tatneft Arena, Kazan; Attendance: 7,400 |

Game reference
M. Viedenský (SH) 08:30; M. Preisinger (PP) 47:30; T. Hričina (ES) 55:35; T. Hričina (PP) 59:44 / Goals / 08:52 (PP) A. Loktionov; 17:09 (PP) K. Petrov; 21:31 (ES) A. Lazarev; 41:53 (ES) I. Golovkov; 48:21 (PP) M. Chudinov; 56:34 (ES) V. Kulemin

| 14 April 2008; 15:30 | Slovakia | 5–2 (0–0, 2–0, 3–2) | Denmark | Tatneft Arena, Kazan; Attendance: 700 |

Game reference
T. Hričina (ES) 29:09; M. Šiška (PP) 35:45; P. Slimák (ES) 46:05; M. Lisoň (ES) 46:33; M. Štajnoch (PP) 54:16 / Goals / 43:44 (PP) A. Jensen; 54:43 (ES) A. Jensen

| 14 April 2008; 19:00 | Germany | 2–6 (1–0, 0–3, 1–3) | Russia | Tatneft Arena, Kazan; Attendance: 5,600 |

Game reference
M. Forster (PP) 13:39; T. Ritter (ES) 41:54 / Goals / 26:03 (PP) K. Petrov; 33:09 (ES) N. Filatov; 35:03 (PP) D. Kugryshev; 49:17 (ES) A. Loktionov; 50:55 (SH) N. Filatov; 55:27 (ES) E. Grachev

| 15 April 2008; 15:30 | Denmark | 1–4 (0–1, 1–2, 0–1) | Canada | Tatneft Arena, Kazan; Attendance: 1,100 |

Game reference
K. Christensen (PP) 36:07 / Goals / 15:30 (ES) M. Scandella; 23:36 (ES) C. Trivino; 28:27 (ES) C. Trivino; 50:47 (ES) C. Trivino

| 16 April 2008; 15:30 | Germany | 5–4 GWS (2–1, 2–3, 0–0); OT: (0–0); SO: (1–0) | Slovakia | Tatneft Arena, Kazan; Attendance: 600 |

Game reference
M. Forster (ES) 00:09; M. El-Sayed (SH) 11:40; T. Kimmel (ES) 30:40; J. Flaake (ES) 37:11; D. Weiss (SO) 65:00 / Goals / 07:21 (SH) M. Uhnák; 20:39 (ES) T. Hričina; 26:58 (PP) R. Pánik; 28:41 (ES) M. Preisinger

| 16 April 2008; 19:00 | Russia | 4–2 (0–0, 2–2, 2–0) | Canada | Tatneft Arena, Kazan; Attendance: 10,000 |

Game reference
D. Kugryshev (ES) 23:21; A. Loktionov (PP) 39:10; E. Grachev (ES) 47:43; P. Chernov (ES) 55:35 / Goals / 31:36 (PP) R. Ellis; 33:44 (ES) M. Duchene

| 17 April 2008; 19:00 | Denmark | 0–4 (0–1, 0–2, 0–1) | Germany | Tatneft Arena, Kazan; Attendance: 500 |

Game reference
Goals / 11:06 (ES) M. Hofbauer; 25:25 (ES) D. Weiss; 36:59 (ES) T. Biersack; 54:20 (ES) P. Pohl

| 18 April 2008; 15:30 | Canada | 6–0 (2–0, 2–0, 2–0) | Slovakia | Tatneft Arena, Kazan; Attendance: 1,000 |

Game reference
C. Hodgson (ES) 00:40; M. Duchene (PP) 10:41; M. Duchene (PP) 31:51; J. Lagace (ES) 33:53; M. Duchene (PP) 54:17; G. Nemisz (ES) 55:09 / Goals

| 18 April 2008; 19:00 | Russia | 10–1 (2–0, 3–1, 5–0) | Denmark | Tatneft Arena, Kazan; Attendance: 6,400 |

Game reference
A. Lazarev (ES) 05:31; A. Yarchuk (ES) 11:03; K. Petrov (PP) 26:46; I. Biryukov (ES) 30:25; N. Filatov (SH) 36:26; A. Raisov (ES) 42:02; K. Petrov (PP) 43:42; A. Lazarev (ES) 50:02; P. Chernov (PP) 53:31; A. Yarchuk (PP) 54:47 / Goals / 32:35 (SH) S. Svendsen

==== Group B ====
| Pos | Team | Pld | W | OTW | OTL | L | GF | GA | GD | Pts | Qualification |
|---|---|---|---|---|---|---|---|---|---|---|---|
| 1 | Sweden | 4 | 4 | 0 | 0 | 0 | 23 | 9 | +14 | 12 | Semifinals |
| 2 | United States | 4 | 3 | 0 | 0 | 1 | 20 | 12 | +8 | 9 | Quarterfinals |
| 3 | Finland | 4 | 2 | 0 | 0 | 2 | 15 | 15 | 0 | 6 | Quarterfinals |
| 4 | Switzerland | 4 | 1 | 0 | 0 | 3 | 9 | 21 | −12 | 3 | Relegation round |
| 5 | Belarus | 4 | 0 | 0 | 0 | 4 | 9 | 19 | −10 | 0 | Relegation round |

Source: IIHF

| 13 April 2008; 15:00 | Sweden | 6–2 (1–1, 1–0, 4–1) | Belarus | Arena Kazan, Kazan; Attendance: 650 |

Game reference
J. Josefson (ES) 09:42; J. Mattsson (ES) 25:49; A. Petersson (PP) 40:20; J. Josefson (ES) 50:58; J. Josefson (PP) 54:09; M. Ekholm (ES) 55:57 / Goals / 12:32 (ES) A. Fomin; 57:39 (PP) A. Fomin

| 13 April 2008; 19:00 | Switzerland | 2–7 (1–1, 0–3, 1–3) | United States | Arena Kazan, Kazan; Attendance: 630 |

Game reference
P. Geering (ES) 14:41; M. Kampf (PP) 52:46 / Goals / 16:07 (PP) J. Florek; 21:07 (ES) J. Morin; 21:34 (ES) C. Moore; 31:57 (ES) P. McRae; 40:06 (ES) D. Kristo; 54:40 (ES) P. McRae; 59:08 (PP) J. Morin

| 14 April 2008; 15:30 | Belarus | 2–5 (1–2, 0–2, 1–1) | United States | Arena Kazan, Kazan; Attendance: 700 |

Game reference
A. Fomin (ES) 03:31; S. Sheleg (PP) 46:00 / Goals / 14:47 (ES) D. Wohlberg; 18:15 (PP) P. McRae; 33:17 (ES) J. Schroeder; 38:03 (PP) J. Morin; 58:09 (EN) J. Florek

| 14 April 2008; 19:00 | Switzerland | 3–5 (0–2, 1–2, 2–1) | Finland | Arena Kazan, Kazan; Attendance: 650 |

Game reference
P. Geering (ES) 25:15; S. Ryser (PP) 45:21; P. Gemperli (PP) 56:03 / Goals / 03:25 (ES) T. Rajala; 18:45 (PP) J. Sallinen; 20:20 (ES) M. Sointu; 32:24 (PP) J. Nättinen; 50:07 (ES) T. Rajala

| 15 April 2008; 19:00 | Finland | 3–5 (1–0, 1–3, 1–2) | Sweden | Arena Kazan, Kazan; Attendance: 860 |

Game reference
J. Nättinen (PP) 04:08; M. Sointu (PP) 36:11; T. Hartikainen (ES) 49:51 / Goals / 23:46 (ES) H. Björklund; 24:24 (ES) A. Petersson; 30:59 (PP) M. Pääjärvi-Svensson; 43:51 (ES) H. Eriksson; 59:39 (EN) M. Johansson

| 16 April 2008; 15:30 | Belarus | 2–4 (0–2, 1–1, 1–1) | Switzerland | Arena Kazan, Kazan; Attendance: 300 |

Game reference
S. Drozd (PP) 26:32; A. Fomin (ES) 52:08 / Goals / 02:03 (ES) M. Kampf; 19:25 (ES) P. Geering; 27:42 (ES) A. Berger; 59:04 (EN) A. Kampf

| 16 April 2008; 19:00 | United States | 4–5 (1–1, 2–2, 1–2) | Sweden | Arena Kazan, Kazan; Attendance: 550 |

Game reference
J. Schroeder (ES) 19:21; C. Moore (ES) 23:26; J. Morin (ES) 34:29; D. Wohlberg (ES) 43:50 / Goals / 09:06 (PP) M. Tedenby; 35:36 (ES) M. Tedenby; 39:10 (PP) J. Josefson; 50:10 (PP) D. Bozic; 59:44 (ES) A. Petersson

| 17 April 2008; 15:30 | Finland | 4–3 (1–1, 1–2, 2–0) | Belarus | Arena Kazan, Kazan; Attendance: 639 |

Game reference
T. Rajala (ES) 16:23; I. Pitkänen (PP) 37:12; M. Sointu (ES) 41:01; P. Jormakka (ES) 55:29 / Goals / 15:36 (PP) S. Sheleg; 23:54 (ES) S. Drozd; 34:24 (ES) A. Fomin

| 18 April 2008; 15:30 | Sweden | 7–0 (2–0, 4–0, 1–0) | Switzerland | Arena Kazan, Kazan; Attendance: 300 |

Game reference
A. Petersson (PP) 02:58; L. Sandström (ES) 13:22; M. Johansson (ES) 26:46; M. Pääjärvi-Svensson (ES) 27:13; J. Mattsson (SH) 35:00; M. Johansson (PP) 38:13; M. Tedenby (ES) 57:53 / Goals

| 18 April 2008; 19:00 | United States | 4–3 (3–1, 0–1, 1–1) | Finland | Arena Kazan, Kazan; Attendance: 770 |

Game reference
J. Schroeder (ES) 00:53; K. Palmieri (ES) 05:09; J. Florek (PP) 10:04; R. Grimshaw (ES) 41:16 / Goals / 04:19 (ES) J. Rask; 31:08 (PP) T. Hartikainen; 42:31 (PP) T. Kivistö

=== Relegation round ===
| Pos | Team | Pld | W | OTW | OTL | L | GF | GA | GD | Pts | Relegation |
|---|---|---|---|---|---|---|---|---|---|---|---|
| 7 | Slovakia | 3 | 3 | 0 | 0 | 0 | 14 | 5 | +9 | 9 | |
| 8 | Switzerland | 3 | 2 | 0 | 0 | 1 | 12 | 6 | +6 | 6 | |
| 9 | Belarus | 3 | 1 | 0 | 0 | 2 | 9 | 12 | −3 | 3 | 2009 Division I |
| 10 | Denmark | 3 | 0 | 0 | 0 | 3 | 5 | 17 | −12 | 0 | 2009 Division I |

Source: IIHF

| 20 April 2008; 13:30 | Belarus | 1–6 (0–3, 0–2, 1–1) | Slovakia | Arena Kazan, Kazan; Attendance: 125 |

Game reference
I. Revenko (ES) 45:29 / Goals / 01:58 (ES) R. Pánik; 14:13 (PP) R. Pánik; 14:49 (ES) A. Lapšanský; 27:26 (ES) R. Pánik; 34:49 (ES) M. Preisinger; 56:53 (ES) T. Hričina

| 20 April 2008; 17:00 | Switzerland | 6–1 (1–0, 4–1, 1–0) | Denmark | Arena Kazan, Kazan; Attendance: 195 |

Game reference
N. Niederreiter (PP) 17:39; A. Berger (ES) 25:28; R. Jose (ES) 32:33; D. Schlumpf (PP) 34:13; S. Ryser (PP) 39:42; O. Baur (ES) 56:25 / Goals / 38:08 (PP) K. Christensen

| 21 April 2008; 15:30 | Denmark | 2–6 (0–2, 1–1, 1–3) | Belarus | Arena Kazan, Kazan; Attendance: 200 |

Game reference
N. Carlsen (PP) 37:56; S. Svendsen (ES) 57:59 / Goals / 05:50 (ES) Y. Solomonov; 07:01 (PP) I. Revenko; 32:03 (PP) Y. Stepanov; 40:36 (PP) I. Revenko; 48:12 (ES) A. Fomin; 56:19 (ES) S. Korolik

| 21 April 2008; 19:00 | Slovakia | 3–2 (0–0, 0–1, 3–1) | Switzerland | Arena Kazan, Kazan; Attendance: 120 |

Game reference
M. Hrivík (PP) 41:39; A. Lapšanský (ES) 47:23; M. Uhnák (ES) 59:50 / Goals / 39:22 (ES) M. Kampf; 52:07 (ES) S. Ryser

=== Final round ===
==== Bracket ====
Quarterfinals
A2 | Canada | 2
B3 | Finland | 1
B2 | United States | 4
A3 | Germany | 1

Semifinals
B1 | Sweden | 2
A2 | Canada | 3
A1 | Russia | 3
B2 | United States | 1

Final
A2 | Canada | 8
A1 | Russia | 0
Third place
B1 | Sweden | 3
B2 | United States | 6

==== Quarterfinals ====
| 20 April 2008; 13:00 | Canada | 2–1 (1–0, 1–0, 0–1) | Finland | Tatneft Arena, Kazan; Attendance: 1,600 |

Game reference
T. Cuma (PP) 15:03; C. Hodgson (PP) 30:57 / Goals / 54:13 (SH) J. Lajunen

| 20 April 2008; 17:00 | United States | 4–1 (1–0, 2–1, 1–0) | Germany | Tatneft Arena, Kazan; Attendance: 1,700 |

Game reference
R. Czarnik (ES) 04:40; D. Wohlberg (ES) 24:38; C. Moore (ES) 30:35; K. Palmieri (ES) 51:36 / Goals / 21:56 (PP) D. Weiss

==== Semifinals ====
| 21 April 2008; 15:30 | Sweden | 2–3 (1–1, 1–1, 0–1) | Canada | Tatneft Arena, Kazan; Attendance: 1,500 |

Game reference
M. Tedenby (ES) 05:51; J. Silfverberg (ES) 21:08 / Goals / 06:28 (ES) M. Duchene; 28:46 (PP) T. Hall; 46:52 (PP) T. Hall

| 21 April 2008; 19:00 | Russia | 3–1 (1–0, 1–0, 1–1) | United States | Tatneft Arena, Kazan; Attendance: 9,500 |

Game reference

Alexander Pechursky
Goalies
Brandon Maxwell
Referees:
(Switzerland) Nadir Mandioni
(Canada) Derek Zalaski
Linesmen:
(Finland) Antti Orelma
(Sweden) Peter Sabelström

| Voinov (Filatov) (PP) – 15:34 | 1–0 |
| Raisov (Lazarev, Chernov) – 37:24 | 2–0 |
| | 2–1 | 54:11 – Bourque (Morin) |
| Petrov (Loktionov) (ENG) – 58:52 | 3–1 |

27 min
Penalties
31 min
38
Shots
28

==== Fifth place game ====
| 22 April 2008; 19:00 | Finland | 3–4 (1–1, 0–2, 2–1) | Germany | Tatneft Arena, Kazan; Attendance: 350 |

Game reference
J. Sallinen (ES) 10:15; E. Haula (SH) 44:43; P. Jormakka (PP) 53:04 / Goals / 19:58 (ES) S. Hanusch; 27:31 (PP) T. Kimmel; 35:34 (ES) T. Ritter; 59:23 (SH) F. Strobl

==== Bronze medal game ====
| 23 April 2008; 15:00 | Sweden | 3–6 (1–2, 2–3, 0–1) | United States | Tatneft Arena, Kazan; Attendance: 1,100 |

Game reference
V. Hedman (PP) 14:23; H. Björklund (ES) 30:39; M. Lundberg (ES) 34:22 / Goals / 19:10 (ES) R. Bourque; 19:26 (ES) R. Czarnik; 25:12 (ES) R. Czarnik; 27:34 (ES) J. Morin; 39:20 (ES) D. Kristo; 55:37 (ES) J. Morin

==== Final ====
| 23 April 2008; 19:00 | Canada | 8–0 (5–0, 2–0, 1–0) | Russia | Tatneft Arena, Kazan; Attendance: 10,000 |

Game reference

Jake Allen
Goalies
Alexander Pechursky
Danila Alistratov
Referees:
(Finland) Tom Laaksonen
(United States) Robert Ritchie
Linesmen:
(United States) David Brown
(Sweden) Peter Sabelström

| Deschamps (SH) – 04:32 | 1–0 |
| Trivino (Sauvé) – 09:02 | 2–0 |
| Eberle (Hodgson, Ellis) (PP) – 15:06 | 3–0 |
| Schenn – 15:55 | 4–0 |
| Eberle (Scandella, Hodgson) – 17:05 | 5–0 |
| Ellis (PP) – 27:14 | 6–0 |
| McMillan (Schenn, Nemisz) – 36:21 | 7–0 |
| Hall (Hodgson, Eberle) – 46:49 | 8–0 |

34 min
Penalties
64 min
31
Shots
29

=== Final standings ===
| Rank | Team |
|---|---|
| 1st place, gold medalist(s) | Canada |
| 2nd place, silver medalist(s) | Russia |
| 3rd place, bronze medalist(s) | United States |
| 4 | Sweden |
| 5 | Germany |
| 6 | Finland |
| 7 | Slovakia |
| 8 | Switzerland |
| 9 | Belarus |
| 10 | Denmark |

Belarus and Denmark are relegated to Division I for the 2009 IIHF World U18 Championships.

=== Statistics ===
==== Scoring leaders ====
| Pos | Player | Country | GP | G | A | Pts | +/− | PIM |
|---|---|---|---|---|---|---|---|---|
| 1 | Cody Hodgson | Canada | 7 | 2 | 10 | 12 | +2 | 8 |
| 2 | Igor Revenko | Belarus | 6 | 3 | 8 | 11 | −1 | 6 |
| 3 | Richard Pánik | Slovakia | 6 | 4 | 6 | 10 | +4 | 0 |
| 3 | Jordan Eberle | Canada | 7 | 4 | 6 | 10 | +2 | 0 |
| 5 | Taylor Hall | Canada | 7 | 4 | 5 | 9 | +4 | 4 |
| 6 | Nikita Filatov | Russia | 6 | 3 | 6 | 9 | +1 | 29 |
| 7 | Alexander Fomin | Belarus | 6 | 6 | 2 | 8 | 0 | 0 |
| 7 | Jeremy Morin | United States | 7 | 6 | 2 | 8 | +6 | 6 |
| 9 | Matt Duchene | Canada | 7 | 5 | 3 | 8 | +6 | 6 |
| 10 | André Petersson | Sweden | 6 | 4 | 4 | 8 | +4 | 2 |
| 10 | Mattias Tedenby | Sweden | 5 | 4 | 4 | 8 | +1 | 35 |

GP = Games played; G = Goals; A = Assists; Pts = Points; +/− = Plus–minus; PIM = Penalties In Minutes
Source: IIHF

==== Goaltending leaders ====
(minimum 40% team's total ice time)

| Pos | Player | Country | TOI | GA | GAA | SA | Sv% | SO |
|---|---|---|---|---|---|---|---|---|
| 1 | Jake Allen | Canada | 420:00 | 10 | 1.43 | 192 | 94.79 | 2 |
| 2 | Brandon Maxwell | United States | 298:23 | 11 | 2.21 | 148 | 92.57 | 0 |
| 3 | Marek Čiliak | Slovakia | 180:00 | 9 | 3.00 | 96 | 90.62 | 0 |
| 4 | Alexander Pechursky | Russia | 215:55 | 11 | 3.06 | 96 | 88.54 | 0 |
| 5 | Nikolaj Nørbak | Denmark | 274:13 | 23 | 5.03 | 193 | 88.08 | 0 |

TOI = Time on ice (minutes:seconds); GA = Goals against; GAA = Goals against average; SA = Shots against; Sv% = Save percentage; SO = Shutouts
Source: IIHF

=== Awards ===
- Best players selected by the Directorate:
  - Best Goaltender: (Canada) Jake Allen
  - Best Defenceman: (Sweden) Erik Karlsson
  - Best Forward: (Russia) Kirill Petrov
  - MVP: (Canada) Jake Allen

Source: IIHF

- Media All-Stars:
- Goaltender: (Canada) Jake Allen
- Defensemen: (Russia) Vyacheslav Voinov / (Sweden) Victor Hedman
- Forwards: (Russia) Kirill Petrov / (Sweden) Mattias Tedenby / (Russia) Nikita Filatov

Source: IIHF

== Division I ==
=== Group A ===
The tournament was played in Toruń, Poland, from 2 to 8 April 2008.

| Pos | Team | Pld | W | OTW | OTL | L | GF | GA | GD | Pts | Promotion or relegation |
|---|---|---|---|---|---|---|---|---|---|---|---|
| 1 | Czech Republic | 5 | 5 | 0 | 0 | 0 | 36 | 5 | +31 | 15 | Promoted to the 2009 Top Division |
| 2 | Kazakhstan | 5 | 3 | 0 | 0 | 2 | 19 | 13 | +6 | 9 | |
| 3 | Lithuania | 5 | 2 | 0 | 0 | 3 | 13 | 26 | −13 | 6 | |
| 4 | Poland | 5 | 2 | 0 | 0 | 3 | 7 | 18 | −11 | 6 | |
| 5 | Ukraine | 5 | 2 | 0 | 0 | 3 | 8 | 12 | −4 | 6 | |
| 6 | Slovenia | 5 | 1 | 0 | 0 | 4 | 15 | 24 | −9 | 3 | Relegated to the 2009 Division II |

Source: IIHF

=== Group B ===
The tournament was played in Riga, Latvia, from 2 to 8 April 2008.

| Pos | Team | Pld | W | OTW | OTL | L | GF | GA | GD | Pts | Promotion or relegation |
|---|---|---|---|---|---|---|---|---|---|---|---|
| 1 | Norway | 5 | 5 | 0 | 0 | 0 | 15 | 3 | +12 | 15 | Promoted to the 2009 Top Division |
| 2 | Latvia | 5 | 4 | 0 | 0 | 1 | 21 | 2 | +19 | 12 | |
| 3 | Austria | 5 | 2 | 1 | 0 | 2 | 11 | 6 | +5 | 8 | |
| 4 | Italy | 5 | 2 | 0 | 1 | 2 | 17 | 10 | +7 | 7 | |
| 5 | Japan | 5 | 1 | 0 | 0 | 4 | 12 | 26 | −14 | 3 | |
| 6 | Netherlands | 5 | 0 | 0 | 0 | 5 | 4 | 33 | −29 | 0 | Relegated to the 2009 Division II |

Source: IIHF

== Division II ==
=== Group A ===
The tournament was played in Méribel and Courchevel, France, from 30 March to 5 April 2008.

| Pos | Team | Pld | W | OTW | OTL | L | GF | GA | GD | Pts | Promotion or relegation |
|---|---|---|---|---|---|---|---|---|---|---|---|
| 1 | France | 5 | 5 | 0 | 0 | 0 | 53 | 4 | +49 | 15 | Promoted to the 2009 Division I |
| 2 | South Korea | 5 | 3 | 1 | 0 | 1 | 31 | 9 | +22 | 11 | |
| 3 | Croatia | 5 | 3 | 0 | 0 | 2 | 32 | 24 | +8 | 9 | |
| 4 | Belgium | 5 | 2 | 0 | 1 | 2 | 14 | 30 | −16 | 7 | |
| 5 | China | 5 | 1 | 0 | 0 | 4 | 14 | 52 | −38 | 3 | |
| 6 | Australia | 5 | 0 | 0 | 0 | 5 | 8 | 33 | −25 | 0 | Relegated to the 2009 Division III |

Source: IIHF

=== Group B ===
The tournament was played in Tallinn, Estonia, from 23 to 29 March 2008.

| Pos | Team | Pld | W | OTW | OTL | L | GF | GA | GD | Pts | Promotion or relegation |
|---|---|---|---|---|---|---|---|---|---|---|---|
| 1 | Hungary | 5 | 4 | 0 | 0 | 1 | 37 | 12 | +25 | 12 | Promoted to the 2009 Division I |
| 2 | Great Britain | 5 | 4 | 0 | 0 | 1 | 27 | 11 | +16 | 12 | |
| 3 | Estonia | 5 | 3 | 0 | 0 | 2 | 20 | 14 | +6 | 9 | |
| 4 | Romania | 5 | 2 | 0 | 0 | 3 | 32 | 21 | +11 | 6 | |
| 5 | Spain | 5 | 2 | 0 | 0 | 3 | 20 | 21 | −1 | 6 | |
| 6 | Israel | 5 | 0 | 0 | 0 | 5 | 11 | 68 | −57 | 0 | Relegated to the 2009 Division III |

Source: IIHF

== Division III ==
=== Group A ===
The tournament was played in Mexico City, Mexico, from 2 to 8 March 2008.

| Pos | Team | Pld | W | OTW | OTL | L | GF | GA | GD | Pts | Promotion |
|---|---|---|---|---|---|---|---|---|---|---|---|
| 1 | Mexico | 4 | 4 | 0 | 0 | 0 | 32 | 2 | +30 | 12 | Promoted to the 2009 Division II |
| 2 | Chinese Taipei | 4 | 3 | 0 | 0 | 1 | 31 | 23 | +8 | 9 | |
| 3 | New Zealand | 4 | 2 | 0 | 0 | 2 | 45 | 18 | +27 | 6 | |
| 4 | South Africa | 4 | 1 | 0 | 0 | 3 | 18 | 26 | −8 | 3 | |
| 5 | Mongolia | 4 | 0 | 0 | 0 | 4 | 7 | 64 | −57 | 0 | |

Source: IIHF

=== Group B ===
The tournament was played in İzmit, Turkey, from 3 to 9 March 2008.

| Pos | Team | Pld | W | OTW | OTL | L | GF | GA | GD | Pts | Promotion |
|---|---|---|---|---|---|---|---|---|---|---|---|
| 1 | Serbia | 4 | 4 | 0 | 0 | 0 | 45 | 0 | +45 | 12 | Promoted to the 2009 Division II |
| 2 | Iceland | 4 | 3 | 0 | 0 | 1 | 48 | 7 | +41 | 9 | |
| 3 | Turkey | 4 | 2 | 0 | 0 | 2 | 34 | 26 | +8 | 6 | |
| 4 | Bulgaria | 4 | 1 | 0 | 0 | 3 | 27 | 35 | −8 | 3 | |
| 5 | Armenia | 4 | 0 | 0 | 0 | 4 | 1 | 87 | −86 | 0 | |

Source: IIHF
