= Florek (surname) =

Florek is a Polish-language surname. Notable people with the surname include:

- Dann Florek (born 1950), American actor and director
- Justin Florek (born 1990), American ice hockey player
