= Kirill Petrov =

Russian ice hockey player

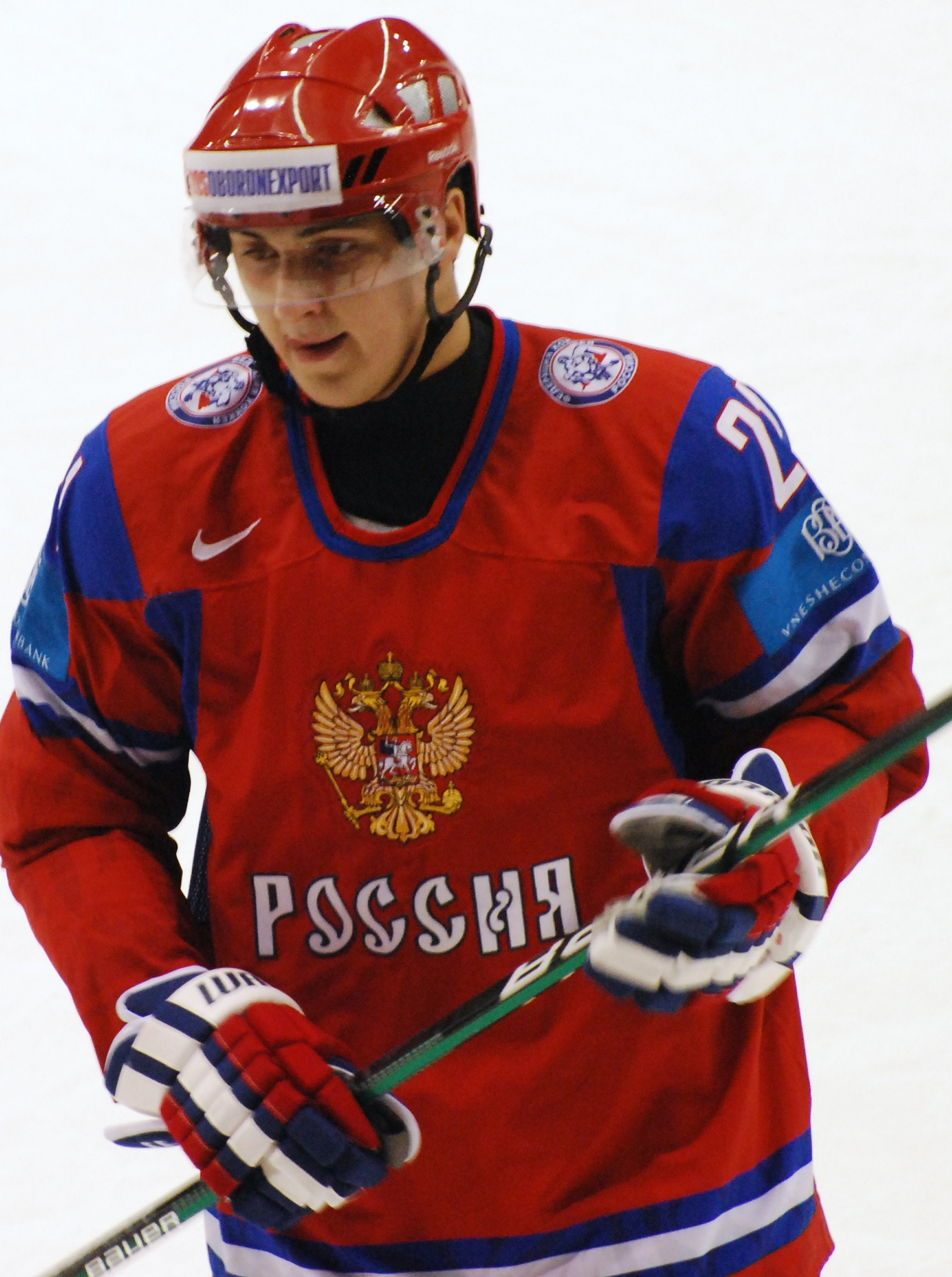
- Petrov in 2009
- Born: April 13, 1990 (age 36) Kazan, Russian SFSR, Soviet Union
- Height: 6 ft 3 in (191 cm)
- Weight: 218 lb (99 kg; 15 st 8 lb)
- Position: Right/left wing
- Shoots: Left
- KHL team Former teams: Free agent Ak Bars Kazan; Yugra Khanty-Mansiysk; Bridgeport Sound Tigers; CSKA Moscow; Avangard Omsk; Neftekhimik Nizhnekamsk
- National team: Russia
- NHL draft: 73rd overall, 2008; New York Islanders
- Playing career: 2007–present

Kirill Andreyevich Petrov (Russian: Кири́лл Андре́евич Петро́в, born April 13, 1990) is a Russian professional ice hockey player who is currently an unrestricted free agent. He most recently played under contract with HC Neftekhimik Nizhnekamsk of the Kontinental Hockey League (KHL). The New York Islanders drafted Petrov in the third round, 73rd overall, in the 2008 NHL entry draft. He was considered a "blue-chip" first-round talent who dropped to the third round of the 2008 NHL Entry Draft because of his contract status at the time with Ak Bars.

== Playing career ==
The New York Islanders drafted Petrov in the third round, 73rd overall, in the 2008 NHL entry draft. He was considered a "blue-chip" first-round talent who dropped to the third round of the 2008 NHL Entry Draft because of his contract status with Ak Bars Kazan of the Kontinental Hockey League (KHL).

Petrov represented Russia at the 2010 World Junior Ice Hockey Championships, leading his team in scoring and being promoted to team captain by the end of the competition. Petrov was the 8th overall scorer in the entire tournament.

There was a real possibility of him joining the New York Islanders of the National Hockey League (NHL) for the 2010–11 season. However, Ak Bars Kazan kept him under contract until the end of the 2014–15 season.

On July 1, 2015, Petrov belatedly signed a one-year entry-level contract with the Islanders. However, after 13 games with the Islanders' minor league affiliate, the Bridgeport Sound Tigers, Petrov returned to Russia to play for CSKA Moscow.

On May 16, 2018, Petrov's rights were traded from CSKA to Avangard Omsk.

After a lone season with Avangard, Petrov returned to Ak Bars Kazan as a free agent, securing a one-year contract on 7 May 2019.

== Career statistics ==
=== Regular season and playoffs ===
			Regular season					Playoffs
Season	Team	League	GP	G	A	Pts	PIM	GP	G	A	Pts	PIM
2005–06	Ak Bars-2 Kazan	RUS-3	36	13	10	23	28	—	—	—	—	—
2006–07	Ak Bars Kazan	RSL	9	1	1	2	8	—	—	—	—	—
2007–08	Ak Bars Kazan	RSL	47	4	6	10	54	8	1	1	2	3
2007–08	Ak Bars-2	RUS-3	1	1	0	1	0	—	—	—	—	—
2008–09	Ak Bars Kazan	KHL	6	1	0	1	2	—	—	—	—	—
2008–09	Ak Bars-2	RUS-3	29	23	23	46	44	—	—	—	—	—
2008–09	Neftyanik Almetyevsk	RUS-2	—	—	—	—	—	2	2	1	3	0
2009–10	Bars Kazan	MHL	4	2	1	3	4	—	—	—	—	—
2009–10	Neftyanik Almetyevsk	RUS-2	22	7	13	20	48	13	12	7	19	24
2009–10	Ak Bars Kazan	KHL	8	0	0	0	4	3	0	1	1	0
2010–11	Ak Bars Kazan	KHL	2	0	0	0	0	—	—	—	—	—
2010–11	Yugra Khanty-Mansiysk	KHL	47	8	11	19	20	6	2	2	4	8
2011–12	Ak Bars Kazan	KHL	52	16	13	29	8	12	3	2	5	8
2012–13	Ak Bars Kazan	KHL	47	12	8	20	26	18	4	1	5	6
2013–14	Ak Bars Kazan	KHL	53	14	15	29	29	6	1	2	3	0
2014–15	Ak Bars Kazan	KHL	47	5	10	15	41	17	2	1	3	12
2015–16	Bridgeport Sound Tigers	AHL	13	1	4	5	10	—	—	—	—	—
2015–16	CSKA Moscow	KHL	15	1	2	3	4	17	4	2	6	24
2016–17	CSKA Moscow	KHL	53	20	18	38	22	10	1	3	4	6
2017–18	CSKA Moscow	KHL	45	9	19	28	26	20	4	6	10	16
2018–19	Avangard Omsk	KHL	57	8	15	23	15	11	2	1	3	2
2019–20	Ak Bars Kazan	KHL	52	13	18	31	26	4	0	1	1	2
2020–21	Ak Bars Kazan	KHL	48	15	12	27	16	15	6	3	9	6
2021–22	Ak Bars Kazan	KHL	43	11	8	19	4	4	0	0	0	0
2022–23	Ak Bars Kazan	KHL	60	12	7	19	34	22	3	4	7	4
2023–24	Ak Bars Kazan	KHL	50	3	12	15	10	3	0	2	2	0
2024–25	Yunison-Moskva	VHL	19	5	8	13	2	—	—	—	—	—
2024–25	Neftekhimik Nizhnekamsk	KHL	23	3	1	4	4	—	—	—	—	—
KHL totals			708	152	167	319	269	168	32	31	63	92

=== International ===
Year	Team	Event	GP	G	A	Pts	PIM
2007	Russia	WJC18	7	0	3	3	2
2008	Russia	WJC18	6	5	2	7	6
2009	Russia	WJC	7	0	0	0	4
2010	Russia	WJC	6	4	6	10	6
2013	Russia	WC	8	1	4	5	0
Junior totals			25	9	11	20	18
Senior totals			8	1	4	5	0

== Awards and honours ==
Award	Year
IIHF World U18 Championships First Team All-Star	2008
