= Daniel Weiss (ice hockey) =

German ice hockey player

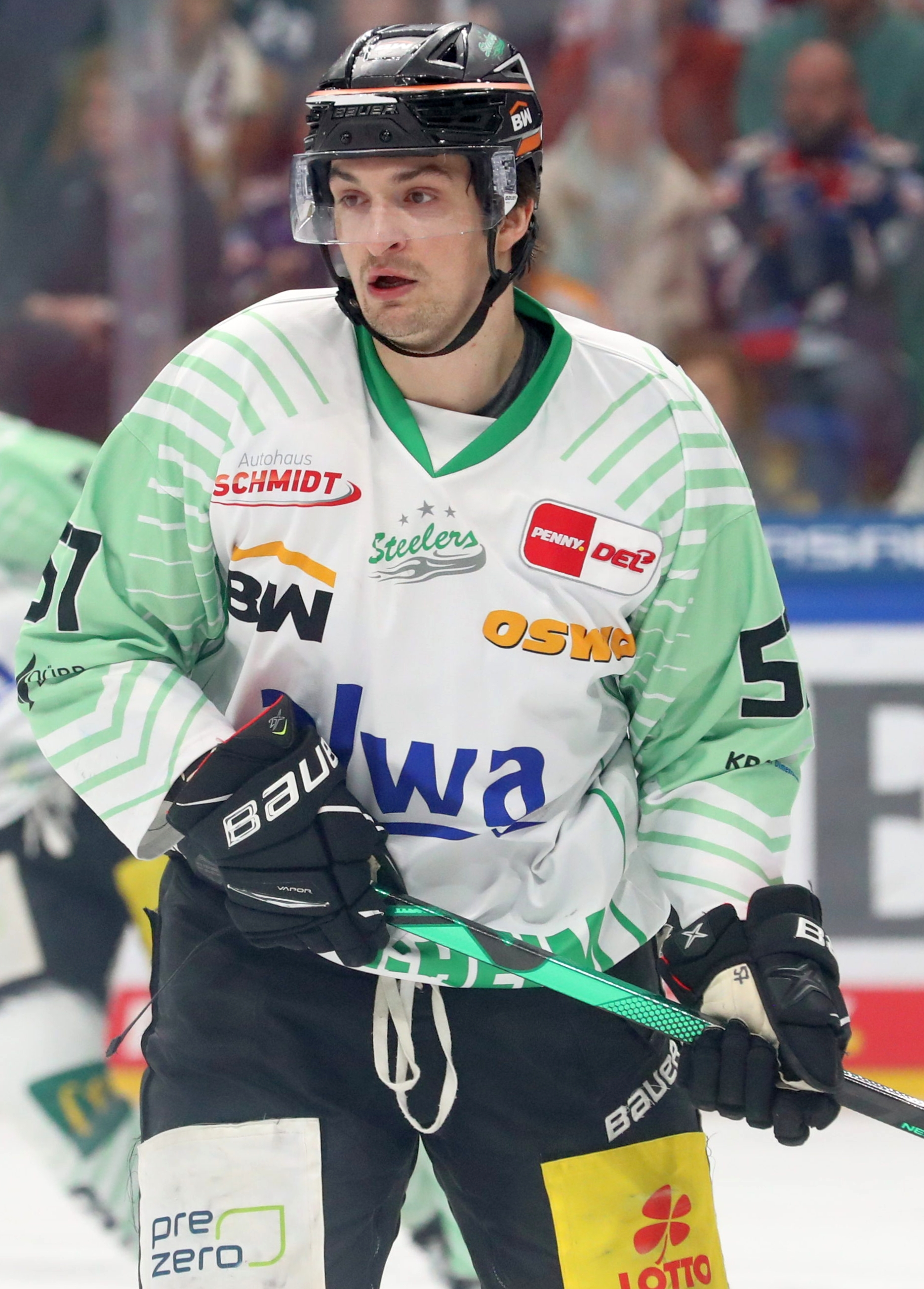
- Born: February 22, 1990 (age 35); Titisee-Neustadt, FRG
- Height: 6 ft 1 in (185 cm)
- Weight: 190 lb (86 kg; 13 st 8 lb)
- Position: Left wing
- Shoots: Left
- DEL2 team Former teams: EC Bad Nauheim; Eisbären Berlin; Thomas Sabo Ice Tigers; Augsburger Panther; Düsseldorfer EG; Iserlohn Roosters; Schwenninger Wild Wings; Bietigheim Steelers
- Playing career: 2006–present

Daniel Weiss (born 22 February 1990 in Titisee-Neustadt, West Germany) is a German professional ice hockey right wing who is currently playing with EC Bad Nauheim of the DEL2.

== Playing career ==
Weiss began playing in Germany's top-flight DEL in 2007 with Eisbären Berlin and was loaned to the Dresdner Eislöwen of the 2nd Bundesliga during the 2009–10 season. He has played internationally for Germany at the IIHF World U18 Championships and the World Juniors. During the 2012-13 season, Weiss went on loan to the Nürnberg IceTigers, before returning to Berlin.

On April 2, 2014, Weiss left Berlin and signed a two-year contract with fellow DEL club, the Augsburger Panther. On April 3, 2016, he signed a three-year deal with Düsseldorfer EG.

After two seasons with DEG, Weiss returned to the Thomas Sabo Ice Tigers, agreeing to a three-year deal on June 26, 2018.

During the 2022–23 season, while in the final season of his contract with the Bietigheim Steelers, Weiss contributed with 17 points through 42 games before opting to move to the DEL2 and join EC Bad Nauheim for the remainder of the season on 10 February 2023.

== Career statistics ==
=== Regular season and playoffs ===
| | | | Regular season | | | | | Playoffs |
| Season | Team | League | GP | G | A | Pts | PIM | GP | G | A | Pts | PIM |
|---|---|---|---|---|---|---|---|---|---|---|---|---|
| 2006–07 | Eisbären Juniors Berlin | 3.GBun | 18 | 1 | 2 | 3 | 20 | — | — | — | — | — |
| 2007–08 | Eisbären Berlin | DEL | 12 | 0 | 0 | 0 | 6 | 2 | 0 | 0 | 0 | 0 |
| 2007–08 | Eisbären Juniors Berlin | 3.GBun | 35 | 11 | 14 | 25 | 67 | — | — | — | — | — |
| 2008–09 | Eisbären Berlin | DEL | 40 | 5 | 5 | 10 | 53 | 12 | 1 | 0 | 1 | 2 |
| 2008–09 | Eisbären Juniors Berlin | 3.GBun | 8 | 2 | 5 | 7 | 18 | — | — | — | — | — |
| 2009–10 | Eisbären Berlin | DEL | 39 | 1 | 4 | 5 | 36 | 5 | 0 | 0 | 0 | 2 |
| 2009–10 | Dresdner Eislöwen | 2.GBun | 12 | 3 | 5 | 8 | 18 | — | — | — | — | — |
| 2010–11 | Eisbären Berlin | DEL | 51 | 6 | 5 | 11 | 107 | 12 | 0 | 0 | 0 | 0 |
| 2011–12 | Eisbären Berlin | DEL | 50 | 4 | 7 | 11 | 22 | 13 | 1 | 2 | 3 | 4 |
| 2012–13 | Eisbären Berlin | DEL | 17 | 1 | 0 | 1 | 20 | — | — | — | — | — |
| 2012–13 | Thomas Sabo Ice Tigers | DEL | 34 | 2 | 5 | 7 | 30 | 3 | 0 | 1 | 1 | 0 |
| 2013–14 | Eisbären Berlin | DEL | 50 | 5 | 5 | 10 | 32 | 3 | 0 | 0 | 0 | 2 |
| 2014–15 | Augsburger Panther | DEL | 45 | 5 | 17 | 22 | 107 | — | — | — | — | — |
| 2015–16 | Augsburger Panther | DEL | 51 | 7 | 7 | 14 | 66 | — | — | — | — | — |
| 2016–17 | Düsseldorfer EG | DEL | 52 | 6 | 7 | 13 | 91 | — | — | — | — | — |
| 2017–18 | Düsseldorfer EG | DEL | 34 | 3 | 8 | 11 | 12 | — | — | — | — | — |
| 2018–19 | Thomas Sabo Ice Tigers | DEL | 52 | 9 | 15 | 24 | 36 | 8 | 2 | 4 | 6 | 10 |
| 2019–20 | Iserlohn Roosters | DEL | 40 | 4 | 5 | 9 | 16 | — | — | — | — | — |
| 2020–21 | Eispiraten Crimmitschau | DEL2 | 22 | 7 | 17 | 24 | 6 | — | — | — | — | — |
| 2020–21 | Schwenninger Wild Wings | DEL | 26 | 2 | 1 | 3 | 8 | — | — | — | — | — |
| 2021–22 | Bietigheim Steelers | DEL | 44 | 7 | 7 | 14 | 20 | — | — | — | — | — |
| 2022–23 | Bietigheim Steelers | DEL | 42 | 8 | 9 | 17 | 22 | — | — | — | — | — |
| DEL totals | | | 679 | 75 | 107 | 182 | 684 | 58 | 4 | 7 | 11 | 20 |

=== International ===
| Year | Team | Event | GP | G | A | Pts | PIM |
|---|---|---|---|---|---|---|---|
| 2008 | Germany | WJC18 | 6 | 4 | 0 | 4 | 8 |
| 2008 | Germany | WJC-D1 | 5 | 2 | 7 | 9 | 6 |
| 2009 | Germany | WJC | 6 | 2 | 2 | 4 | 2 |
| 2010 | Germany | WJC-D1 | 5 | 3 | 4 | 7 | 0 |
| Junior totals | | | 22 | 11 | 13 | 24 | 16 |
