= Mathias Seger =

Swiss ice hockey player

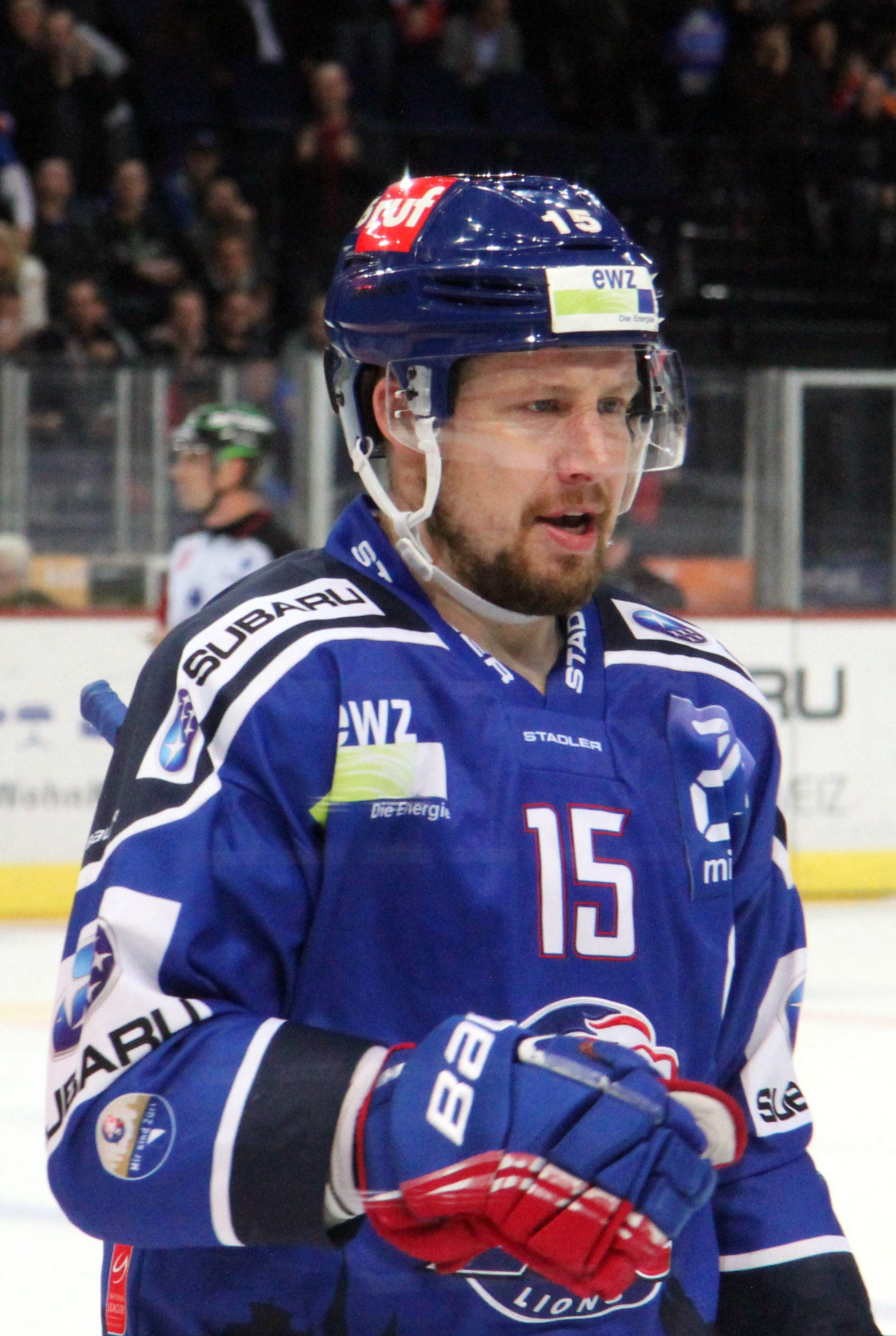
- Born: 17 December 1977 (age 47) Flawil, Switzerland
- Height: 5 ft 11 in (180 cm)
- Weight: 185 lb (84 kg; 13 st 3 lb)
- Position: Defence
- Shot: Left
- Played for: SC Rapperswil-Jona; ZSC Lions
- National team: Switzerland
- Playing career: 1996–2018

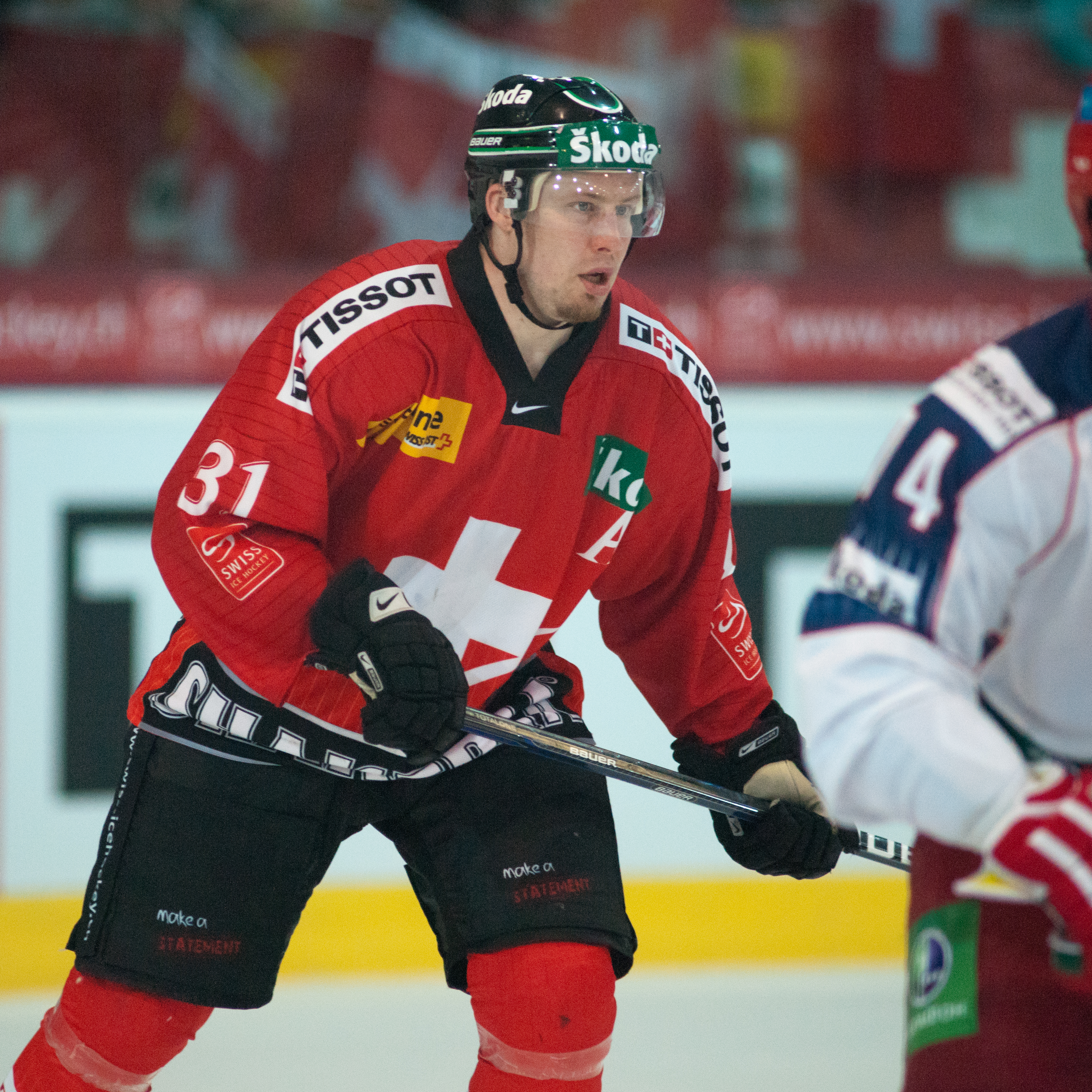

Medal record

Men's Ice hockey

Representing Switzerland

World Championships
Silver medal – second place	2013 Sweden/Finland	

Mathias Seger (born 17 December 1977) is a Swiss former professional ice hockey defenceman who played for the SC Rapperswil-Jona Lakers and the ZSC Lions of the National League (NL). Seger began his professional career with SC Rapperswil-Jona in 1996. He played three seasons with Rapperswil-Jona before joining the Lions in 1999. With the Swiss men's national team he won a silver medal at the 2013 World Championships. Seger also won the 2009 Champions League as well as six National League titles, all with the ZSC Lions. He was inducted into the IIHF Hall of Fame in 2020.

== Playing career ==
Seger was selected to play for the Switzerland men's national ice hockey team at the 2010 Winter Olympics. He also represented Switzerland at the 1996 and 1997 IIHF World U20 Championship, and the 1998, 1999, 2000, 2001, 2002, 2003, 2004, 2005, 2006, 2008, 2009, 2010, 2011, 2012, 2013 and 2014 Ice Hockey World Championship, and the 2002 and 2006 Winter Olympics.

By playing his 16th World Championship in 2014, Seger set a record for most appearances. On 7 January 2014 Seger was named to Switzerland's official 2014 Winter Olympics roster, marking his fourth Olympic appearance.

On 28 February 2017 Seger agreed to a one-year contract extension with the Lions for a reported worth of CHF 1.5 million.

In the summer of 2017, Seger was stripped of Zurich captaincy for undisclosed reasons. Patrick Geering became the new captain of the team. After winning his sixth Swiss championship title with the ZSC Lions in 2018, he announced the end of his playing career. He played a total of 1167 games in the National League, as well as 327 games with the Swiss national team.

On 4 February 2020 he was announced as an inductee into the player category of the IIHF Hall of Fame. The induction ceremony was scheduled during the 2020 IIHF World Championship, but was delayed due to the COVID-19 pandemic. The IIHF Hall of Fame class of 2020/2022 was inducted during the 2022 IIHF World Championship.

In 2020 he was introduced in to the IIHF All-Time Switzerland Team.

== Career statistics ==
=== Regular season and playoffs ===
			Regular season					Playoffs
Season	Team	League	GP	G	A	Pts	PIM	GP	G	A	Pts	PIM
1993–94	EHC Uzwil	SUI.2 U20
1993–94	EHC Uzwil	SUI.3
1994–95	EHC Uzwil	SUI.2 U20
1994–95	EHC Uzwil	SUI.3	32	2	6	8		—	—	—	—	—
1995–96	EHC Uzwil	SUI.3
1996–97	SC Rapperswil–Jona	NDA	45	0	1	1	32	3	0	0	0	0
1996–97	EHC Wetzikon	SUI.3	1	0	2	2		—	—	—	—	—
1997–98	SC Rapperswil–Jona	NDA	39	7	7	14	52	7	0	3	3	12
1998–99	SC Rapperswil–Jona	NDA	42	6	9	15	66	5	0	0	0	14
1999–2000	ZSC Lions	NLA	41	5	15	20	64	15	2	4	6	24
2000–01	ZSC Lions	NLA	44	4	12	16	40	16	2	4	6	18
2001–02	ZSC Lions	NLA	29	4	11	15	22	17	0	4	4	22
2002–03	ZSC Lions	NLA	44	4	10	14	58	12	1	2	3	6
2003–04	ZSC Lions	NLA	43	3	9	12	56	13	1	3	4	4
2004–05	ZSC Lions	NLA	25	3	9	12	54	15	2	3	5	30
2005–06	ZSC Lions	NLA	44	8	19	27	96	—	—	—	—	—
2006–07	ZSC Lions	NLA	44	4	7	11	80	5	0	0	0	6
2007–08	ZSC Lions	NLA	50	14	13	27	80	17	0	5	5	20
2008–09	ZSC Lions	NLA	45	4	22	26	80	4	0	0	0	2
2009–10	ZSC Lions	NLA	47	8	43	51	80	7	2	5	7	8
2010–11	ZSC Lions	NLA	48	5	17	22	102	5	1	1	2	4
2011–12	ZSC Lions	NLA	43	4	17	21	30	14	2	4	6	4
2012–13	ZSC Lions	NLA	50	9	23	32	50	12	0	9	9	18
2013–14	ZSC Lions	NLA	45	5	14	19	66	17	2	1	3	26
2014–15	ZSC Lions	NLA	42	1	14	15	20	12	2	3	5	10
2015–16	ZSC Lions	NLA	50	4	12	16	24	4	0	0	0	4
2016–17	ZSC Lions	NLA	47	1	9	10	42	6	0	1	1	0
2017–18	ZSC Lions	NL	29	0	7	7	22	14	0	0	0	6
NDA/NLA/NL totals			937	103	300	403	1216	220	17	51	68	248

=== International ===
Year	Team	Event	GP	G	A	Pts	PIM
1995	Switzerland	EJC	5	0	1	1	10
1996	Switzerland	WJC	5	1	0	1	40
1997	Switzerland	WJC	6	0	2	2	10
1998	Switzerland	WC	9	1	0	1	6
1999	Switzerland	WC	6	1	1	2	8
2000	Switzerland	WC	7	0	0	0	8
2001	Switzerland	WC	6	0	3	3	6
2002	Switzerland	OG	4	0	1	1	4
2002	Switzerland	WC	6	0	0	0	6
2003	Switzerland	WC	7	1	3	4	8
2004	Switzerland	WC	7	0	2	2	2
2005	Switzerland	OGQ	3	0	1	1	4
2005	Switzerland	WC	7	0	0	0	8
2006	Switzerland	OG	3	0	1	1	4
2006	Switzerland	WC	5	0	0	0	0
2008	Switzerland	WC	4	0	0	0	0
2009	Switzerland	WC	6	1	1	2	4
2010	Switzerland	OG	5	0	2	2	4
2010	Switzerland	WC	7	0	2	2	6
2011	Switzerland	WC	5	0	1	1	4
2012	Switzerland	WC	7	0	0	0	0
2013	Switzerland	WC	10	0	2	2	6
2014	Switzerland	OG	4	0	0	0	0
2014	Switzerland	WC	7	0	2	2	2
Junior totals			16	1	3	4	60
Senior totals			125	4	22	26	90
