= Jere Sallinen =

Finnish ice hockey player

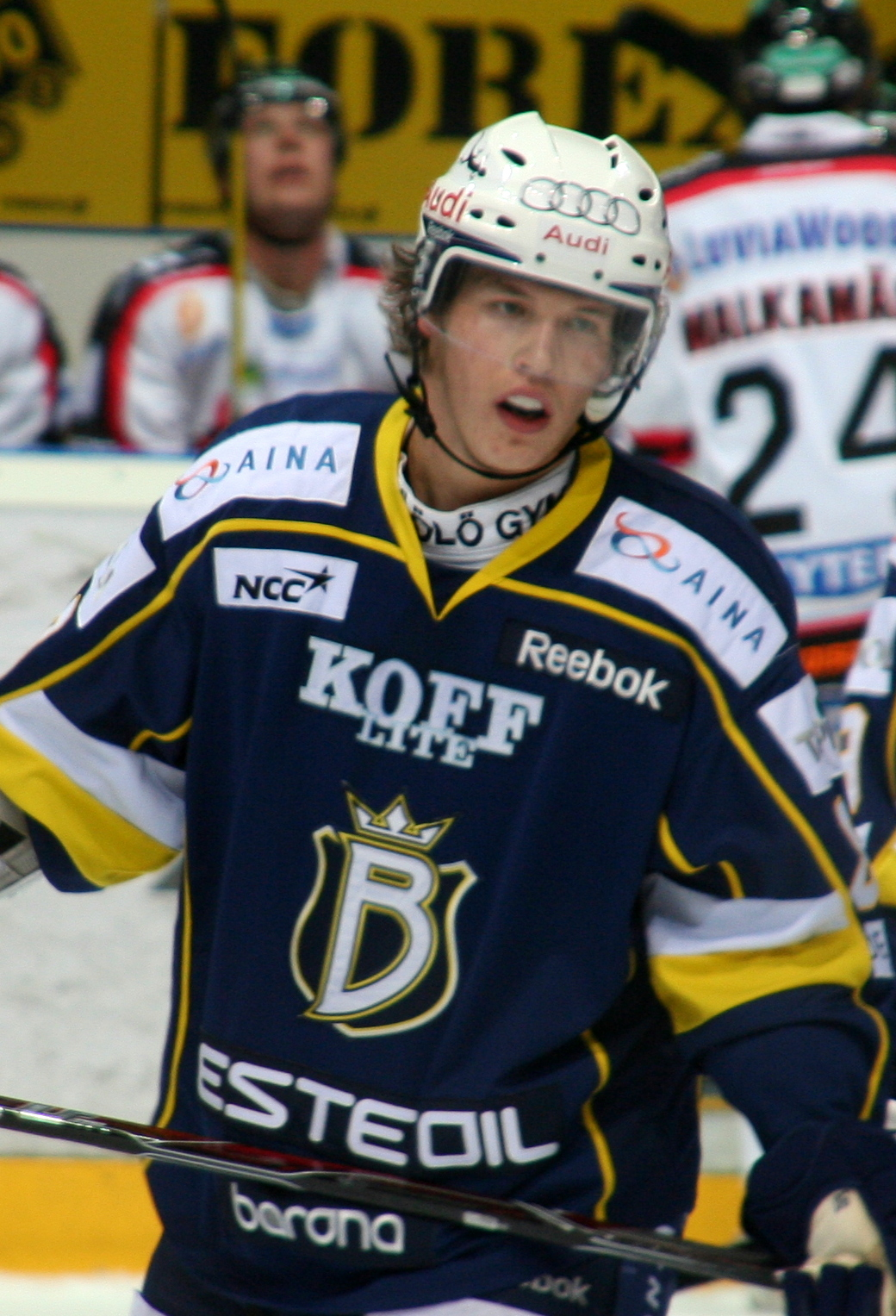
- Born: October 26, 1990 (age 35) Espoo, Finland
- Height: 6 ft 0 in (183 cm)
- Weight: 183 lb (83 kg; 13 st 1 lb)
- Position: Left wing
- Shoots: Left
- NL team Former teams: EHC Biel; Espoo Blues; HPK Hämeenlinna; Örebro HK; Jokerit; Bakersfield Condors; HIFK
- National team: Finland
- NHL draft: 163rd overall, 2009; Minnesota Wild
- Playing career: 2008–present

Jere Sallinen (born October 26, 1990) is a Finnish professional ice hockey winger who is currently playing with EHC Biel of the National League (NL). He was originally selected by the Minnesota Wild in the 6th round (163rd overall) of the 2009 NHL entry draft. His older brother Tomi also plays professional hockey in Europe.

== Playing career ==
Sallinen played youth hockey within the Espoo Blues organization, before making his senior debut with the club in the 2007–08 season. Sallinen was a late round selection in the 2009 NHL draft for the Minnesota Wild, however opted to continue his professional career in Europe. In the midst of his fifth season with Espoo, while still attempting to establish himself at the SM-liiga level, he was loaned to fellow Finnish club, HPK to finish out the 2011–12 season.

On May 2, 2012, Sallinen made the move to HPK permanent from the Blues on a two-year deal. He responded instantly to his new club in breaking out with a career high 15 goals and 42 points in 57 games for the 2012–13 season. In the final year of his contract with HPK, Sallinen was unable to reproduce his offensive presence from the previous campaign and was a late season transfer candidate in agreeing to move to the Swedish Hockey League with Örebro HK on February 21, 2014.

After 6 games and helping Örebro HK avoid relegation, Sallinen as a free agent agreed to sign with Finnish Kontinental Hockey League entrant, Jokerit on a two-year deal on April 14, 2014. Over two seasons with Jokerit, Sallinen appeared in 98 regular season KHL games with the club for 34 points.

Following Jokerit's surprise first round defeat to Torpedo Nizhny Novgorod in the 2015–16 season, Sallinen as a free agent agreed to pursue an NHL career in signing a one-year entry-level contract with the Edmonton Oilers on March 13, 2016. In the 2016–17 season, Sallinen was unable to make an impact in North America, registering just 10 points in 53 games with the Oilers American Hockey League affiliate, the Bakersfield Condors.

With the Condors unable to gain a post-season berth, Sallinen as an impending free agent opted to return to Sweden for a second stint with Örebro HK of the SHL. He signed a two-year contract on May 12, 2017.

At the conclusion of his contract in Sweden, Sallinen returned to the Liiga in Finland, agreeing to an optional two-year deal with HIFK on 7 May 2019.

On June 18, 2021, Sallinen joined EHC Biel of the National League (NL) on a one-year deal.

== Career statistics ==
=== Regular season and playoffs ===
			Regular season					Playoffs
Season	Team	League	GP	G	A	Pts	PIM	GP	G	A	Pts	PIM
2007–08	Espoo Blues	Jr. A	36	11	19	30	94	3	0	2	2	8
2007–08	Espoo Blues	SM-l	6	0	0	0	2	—	—	—	—	—
2008–09	Espoo Blues	Jr. A	9	1	2	3	31	—	—	—	—	—
2009–10	Espoo Blues	Jr. A	6	5	3	8	10	—	—	—	—	—
2009–10	Espoo Blues	SM-l	38	5	6	11	18	3	0	2	2	2
2010–11	Espoo Blues	SM-l	55	6	8	14	28	11	1	0	1	10
2010–11	Espoo Blues	Jr. A	—	—	—	—	—	3	5	0	5	4
2011–12	Espoo Blues	SM-l	21	1	2	3	39	—	—	—	—	—
2011–12	Jokipojat	Mestis	15	4	5	9	4	—	—	—	—	—
2011–12	HPK	SM-l	11	1	2	3	2	—	—	—	—	—
2012–13	HPK	SM-l	57	15	27	42	30	5	1	1	2	6
2013–14	HPK	Liiga	51	5	14	19	88	—	—	—	—	—
2013–14	Örebro HK	SHL	6	2	1	3	0	—	—	—	—	—
2014–15	Jokerit	KHL	48	8	7	15	28	10	1	3	4	6
2015–16	Jokerit	KHL	50	8	11	19	79	6	0	0	0	8
2016–17	Bakersfield Condors	AHL	53	4	6	10	20	—	—	—	—	—
2017–18	Örebro HK	SHL	50	8	15	23	38	—	—	—	—	—
2018–19	Örebro HK	SHL	51	8	14	22	53	2	0	0	0	0
2019–20	HIFK	Liiga	53	22	17	39	12	—	—	—	—	—
2020–21	HIFK	Liiga	45	15	20	35	20	8	4	0	4	4
2021–22	EHC Biel	NL	32	11	8	19	18	6	1	0	1	2
Liiga totals			337	70	96	166	239	27	6	3	9	22
KHL totals			98	16	18	34	107	16	1	3	4	14

Medal record

Representing Finland

Ice hockey

World Championships
Gold medal – first place	2019 Slovakia	
Gold medal – first place	2022 Finland	
Silver medal – second place	2014 Belarus	
Silver medal – second place	2021 Latvia	

=== International ===
Year	Team	Event	Result	GP	G	A	Pts	PIM
2008	Finland	U18	6th	6	2	1	3	31
2010	Finland	WJC	5th	2	0	0	0	0
2014	Finland	WC	2nd place, silver medalist(s)	9	0	0	0	4
2019	Finland	WC	1st place, gold medalist(s)	9	1	0	1	4
2021	Finland	WC	2nd place, silver medalist(s)	9	0	1	1	0
2022	Finland	WC	1st place, gold medalist(s)	10	1	3	4	0
2023	Finland	WC	7th	4	0	1	1	2
Junior totals				8	2	1	3	31
Senior totals				41	2	5	7	10
