= Marc El-Sayed =

German ice hockey player

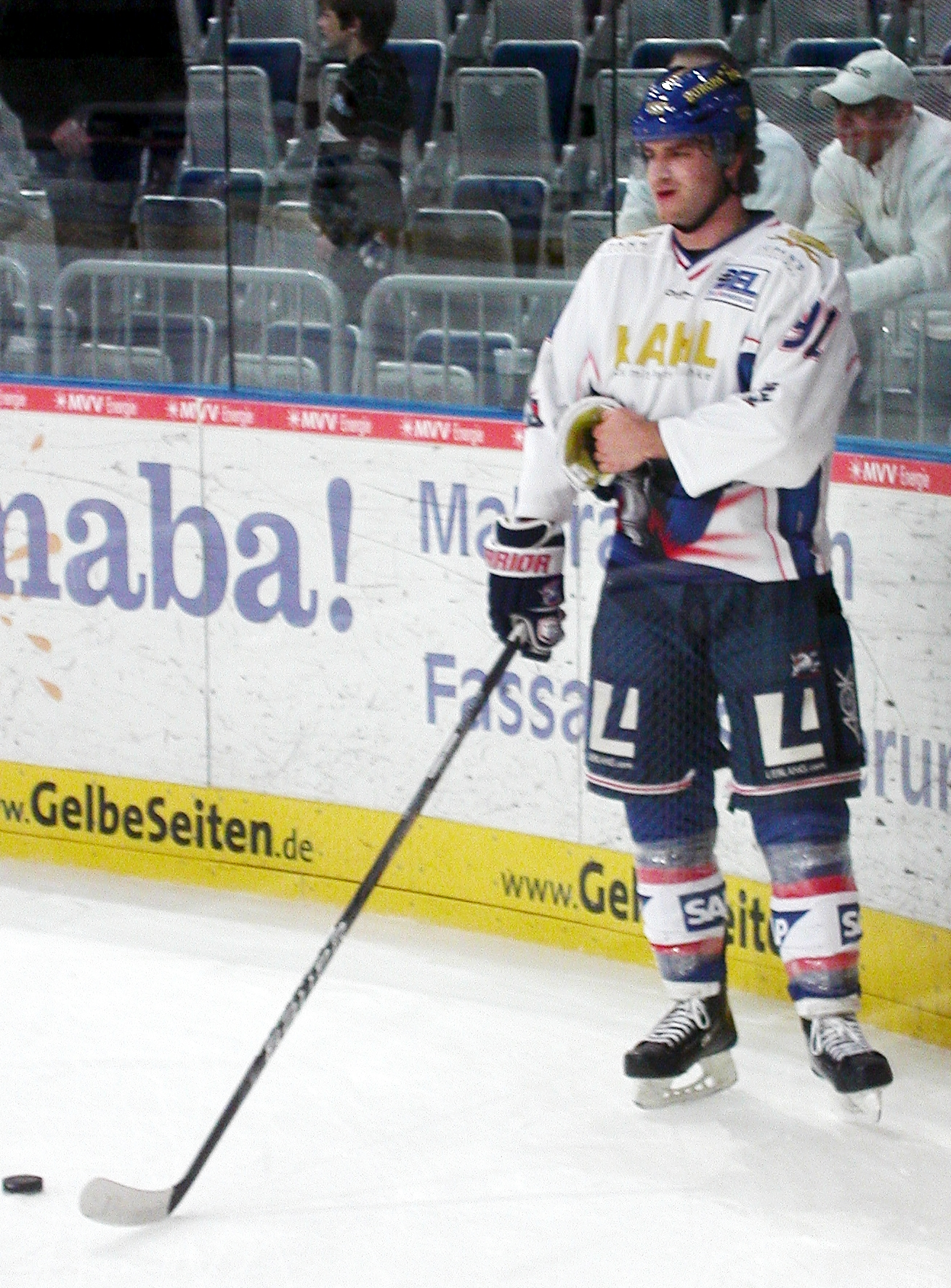
- Born: January 18, 1991 (age 34); Wetzlar, Germany
- Height: 6 ft 3 in (191 cm)
- Weight: 212 lb (96 kg; 15 st 2 lb)
- Position: Forward
- Shoots: Left
- DEL2 team Former teams: EC Bad Nauheim; Adler Mannheim; Thomas Sabo Ice Tigers; Schwenninger Wild Wings
- Playing career: 2009–present

Marc El-Sayed (born January 18, 1991) is a German professional ice hockey Forward who is currently playing for the EC Bad Nauheim in the DEL2. He had originally played the beginning of his professional career with Adler Mannheim. On April 1, 2014, El-Sayed signed a one-year contract to join the Thomas Sabo Ice Tigers. He remained two years with the Ice Tigers before signing with fellow DEL side Schwenninger Wild Wings in April 2016.

After three seasons with the Wild Wings, El-Sayed left the DEL and returned to his original home junior club, EC Bad Nauheim of the DEL2, on a two-year contract on March 12, 2019.

== Career statistics ==
=== Regular season and playoffs ===
			Regular season					Playoffs
Season	Team	League	GP	G	A	Pts	PIM	GP	G	A	Pts	PIM
2008–09	Heilbronner Falken	2.GBun	17	0	0	0	6	3	0	0	0	27
2009–10	Heilbronner Falken	2.GBun	50	4	8	12	20	6	0	0	0	4
2009–10	Adler Mannheim	DEL	2	0	0	0	0	—	—	—	—	—
2010–11	Adler Mannheim	DEL	44	2	5	7	2	6	0	0	0	2
2010–11	Heilbronner Falken	2.GBun	5	1	2	3	2	—	—	—	—	—
2011–12	Adler Mannheim	DEL	48	1	6	7	4	14	2	0	2	4
2012–13	Adler Mannheim	DEL	47	2	7	9	20	5	0	0	0	0
2013–14	Adler Mannheim	DEL	50	7	11	18	10	5	0	0	0	4
2014–15	Thomas Sabo Ice Tigers	DEL	51	2	5	7	12	8	0	0	0	0
2015–16	Thomas Sabo Ice Tigers	DEL	34	0	1	1	6	2	0	0	0	0
2016–17	Schwenninger Wild Wings	DEL	52	13	11	24	44	—	—	—	—	—
2017–18	Schwenninger Wild Wings	DEL	31	0	0	0	6	2	1	0	1	0
2018–19	Schwenninger Wild Wings	DEL	49	2	8	10	6	—	—	—	—	—
DEL totals			408	29	54	83	110	42	3	0	3	10

=== International ===
Year	Team	Event	GP	G	A	Pts	PIM
2008	Germany	U17	5	0	3	3	4
2008	Germany	WJC18	6	1	0	1	2
2009	Germany	WJC18	6	3	3	6	0
2011	Germany	WJC	6	0	0	0	0
Junior totals			23	4	6	10	6
