= Andrei Loktionov =

Russian ice hockey player (born 1990)

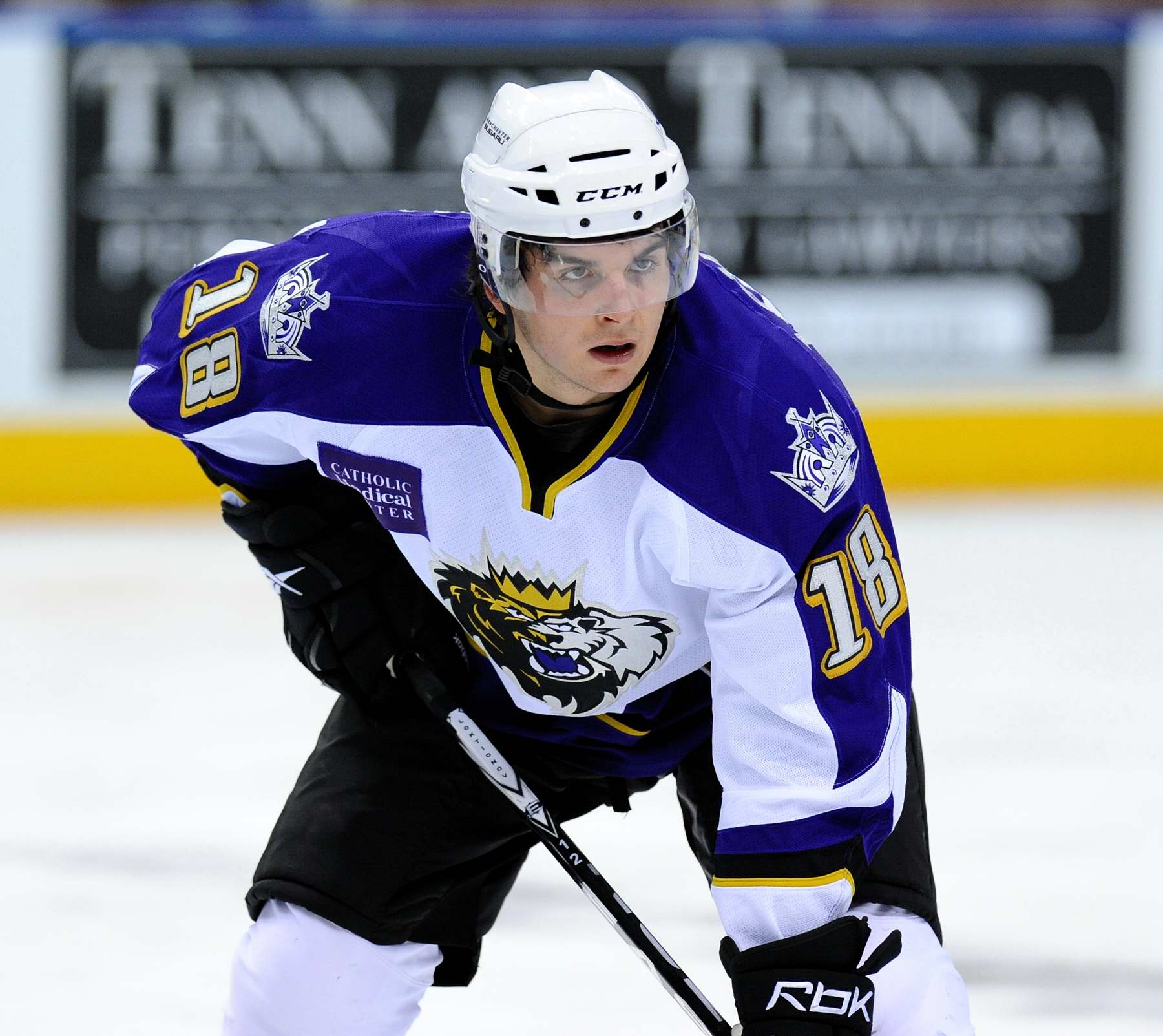
- Loktionov with the Manchester Monarchs in 2010
- Born: 30 May 1990 (age 36) Voskresensk, Russian SFSR, Soviet Union
- Height: 5 ft 11 in (180 cm)
- Weight: 187 lb (85 kg; 13 st 5 lb)
- Position: Centre
- Shoots: Left
- KHL team Former teams: Free agent Lokomotiv Yaroslavl; Los Angeles Kings; New Jersey Devils; Carolina Hurricanes; Metallurg Magnitogorsk; CSKA Moscow; Spartak Moscow; SKA Saint Petersburg; Sibir Novosibirsk
- National team: Russia
- NHL draft: 123rd overall, 2008; Los Angeles Kings
- Playing career: 2007–present

Andrei Vyacheslavovich Loktionov (Russian: Андре́й Вячесла́вович Локтио́нов; born 30 May 1990) is a Russian professional ice hockey player who is currently an unrestricted free agent. He most recently for Sibir Novosibirsk of the Kontinental Hockey League (KHL). He has also played in the National Hockey League (NHL) with the Los Angeles Kings, New Jersey Devils, and the Carolina Hurricanes. Loktionov was drafted by the Kings in the fifth round, 128th overall, at the 2008 NHL entry draft.

== Playing career ==
A product of the HC Khimik hockey school in Voskresensk, Loktionov then skated for Spartak Moscow's system before signing with Lokomotiv Yaroslavl. He is also a longtime member of the 1990-born Team Russia. He was drafted 123rd overall in the 2008 NHL entry draft by the Los Angeles Kings.

During the 2010–11 season, Loktionov scored his first career NHL goal on 19 October 2010, against Justin Peters of the Carolina Hurricanes. He was with the Kings during their 2012 Stanley Cup championship season, but did not have his name engraved on the Stanley Cup as he only played 39 regular season games (less than half of the season) with the team.

On 6 February 2013, Loktionov was acquired by the New Jersey Devils in exchange for a fifth-round draft pick in the 2013 NHL entry draft. He was then assigned to the Devils' American Hockey League (AHL) affiliate, the Albany Devils.

On 5 March 2014, Loktionov was traded to the Carolina Hurricanes, along with a 2017 conditional third-round draft pick, in exchange for winger Tuomo Ruutu. At the end of the season, the Hurricanes opted not to provide Loktionov with a qualifying offer and as a result, he became an unrestricted free agent on 1 July 2014.

Without a club midway into the 2014–15 season, Loktionov signed for the remainder of the season to return to Lokomotiv Yaroslavl in the KHL on 28 November 2014.

After three seasons in the KHL with Lokomotiv, Loktionov as a free agent following the 2016–17 season, opted for another attempt at the NHL in accepting a professional try-out to attend his original draft club, the Los Angeles Kings training camp on 14 July 2017. He was released by the Kings on 27 September 2017. Loktionov returned to Russia and continued his tenure with Lokomotiv.

After five seasons with Lokomotiv Yaroslavl, Loktionov left as a free agent following the 2018–19 season. He signed a one-year contract to continue in the KHL with Metallurg Magnitogorsk on 1 May 2019. In the 2019–20 season, Loktionov played in a bottom six role registering just 3 goals and 13 points in 60 regular season games. He made 5 post-season appearances, collecting 2 assists.

Loktionov opted for free agency for the second straight season, agreeing to an optional two-year contract with contending club, CSKA Moscow on 1 May 2020.

Following his first season with CSKA, Loktionov's rights were traded to Amur Khabarovsk on 28 May 2021. With Loktionov, unwilling to sign with Amur, he was later traded to Spartak Moscow in exchange for Kirill Slepets and monetary compensation on 25 August 2021. He was signed to a two-year contract extension with Spartak on 28 August.

After three seasons with Spartak, Loktionov left as free agent and was signed to a two-year contract with SKA Saint Petersburg on 10 July 2025. On January, 25 2026 SKA traded Loktionov to Sibir Novosibirsk in exchange for Scott Wilson.

== Career statistics ==
=== Regular season and playoffs ===
			Regular season					Playoffs
Season	Team	League	GP	G	A	Pts	PIM	GP	G	A	Pts	PIM
2007–08	Lokomotiv Yaroslavl	RSL	7	0	1	1	0	2	0	0	0	0
2008–09	Windsor Spitfires	OHL	51	24	42	66	16	20	11	22	33	2
2009–10	Manchester Monarchs	AHL	29	9	15	24	12	16	1	8	9	2
2009–10	Los Angeles Kings	NHL	1	0	0	0	0	—	—	—	—	—
2010–11	Manchester Monarchs	AHL	34	8	23	31	6	—	—	—	—	—
2010–11	Los Angeles Kings	NHL	19	4	3	7	2	—	—	—	—	—
2011–12	Manchester Monarchs	AHL	32	5	15	20	10	—	—	—	—	—
2011–12	Los Angeles Kings	NHL	39	3	4	7	2	2	0	0	0	0
2012–13	Manchester Monarchs	AHL	37	7	15	22	6	—	—	—	—	—
2012–13	Albany Devils	AHL	3	0	0	0	0	—	—	—	—	—
2012–13	New Jersey Devils	NHL	28	8	4	12	4	—	—	—	—	—
2013–14	New Jersey Devils	NHL	48	4	8	12	12	—	—	—	—	—
2013–14	Carolina Hurricanes	NHL	20	3	7	10	2	—	—	—	—	—
2014–15	Lokomotiv Yaroslavl	KHL	26	9	6	15	10	6	0	1	1	2
2015–16	Lokomotiv Yaroslavl	KHL	56	8	14	22	32	5	0	1	1	4
2016–17	Lokomotiv Yaroslavl	KHL	58	12	15	27	18	15	4	8	12	0
2017–18	Lokomotiv Yaroslavl	KHL	25	8	6	14	6	9	1	1	2	2
2018–19	Lokomotiv Yaroslavl	KHL	49	16	25	41	26	10	0	2	2	0
2019–20	Metallurg Magnitogorsk	KHL	60	3	10	13	16	5	0	2	2	2
2020–21	CSKA Moscow	KHL	35	3	13	16	6	23	2	7	9	27
2021–22	Spartak Moscow	KHL	31	8	8	16	8	5	2	1	3	2
2022–23	Spartak Moscow	KHL	65	15	15	30	20	—	—	—	—	—
2023–24	Spartak Moscow	KHL	53	10	31	41	12	11	2	4	6	0
2024–25	Spartak Moscow	KHL	64	17	16	33	12	12	2	8	10	0
2025–26	SKA Saint Petersburg	KHL	34	1	6	7	10	—	—	—	—	—
2025–26	Sibir Novosibirsk	KHL	14	0	3	3	5	1	0	0	0	2
KHL totals			570	110	168	278	181	102	13	35	48	41
NHL totals			155	22	26	48	22	2	0	0	0	0

Medal record

Representing Russia

Ice hockey

World Championships
Gold medal – first place	2014 Minsk	

IIHF World U18 Championship
Gold medal – first place	2007 Finland	
Silver medal – second place	2008 Russia	

=== International ===
Year	Team	Event	Result	GP	G	A	Pts	PIM
2007	Russia	WJC18	1st place, gold medalist(s)	7	2	4	6	2
2008	Russia	WJC18	2nd place, silver medalist(s)	6	3	5	8	29
2013	Russia	WC	6th	7	0	1	1	0
2014	Russia	WC	1st place, gold medalist(s)	1	0	0	0	0
Junior totals				13	5	9	14	31
Senior totals				8	0	1	1	0

== Awards ==
- Won gold with Team Russia in the 2007 IIHF World U18 Championships
- Won silver with Team Russia in the 2008 IIHF World U18 Championships
- Won the Memorial Cup with the Windsor Spitfires in 2009
- Won the Stanley Cup with the Los Angeles Kings in 2012
- Won gold with Team Russia in the 2014 IIHF World Championship
