= Jacob Lagacé =

Canadian ice hockey player (born 1990)

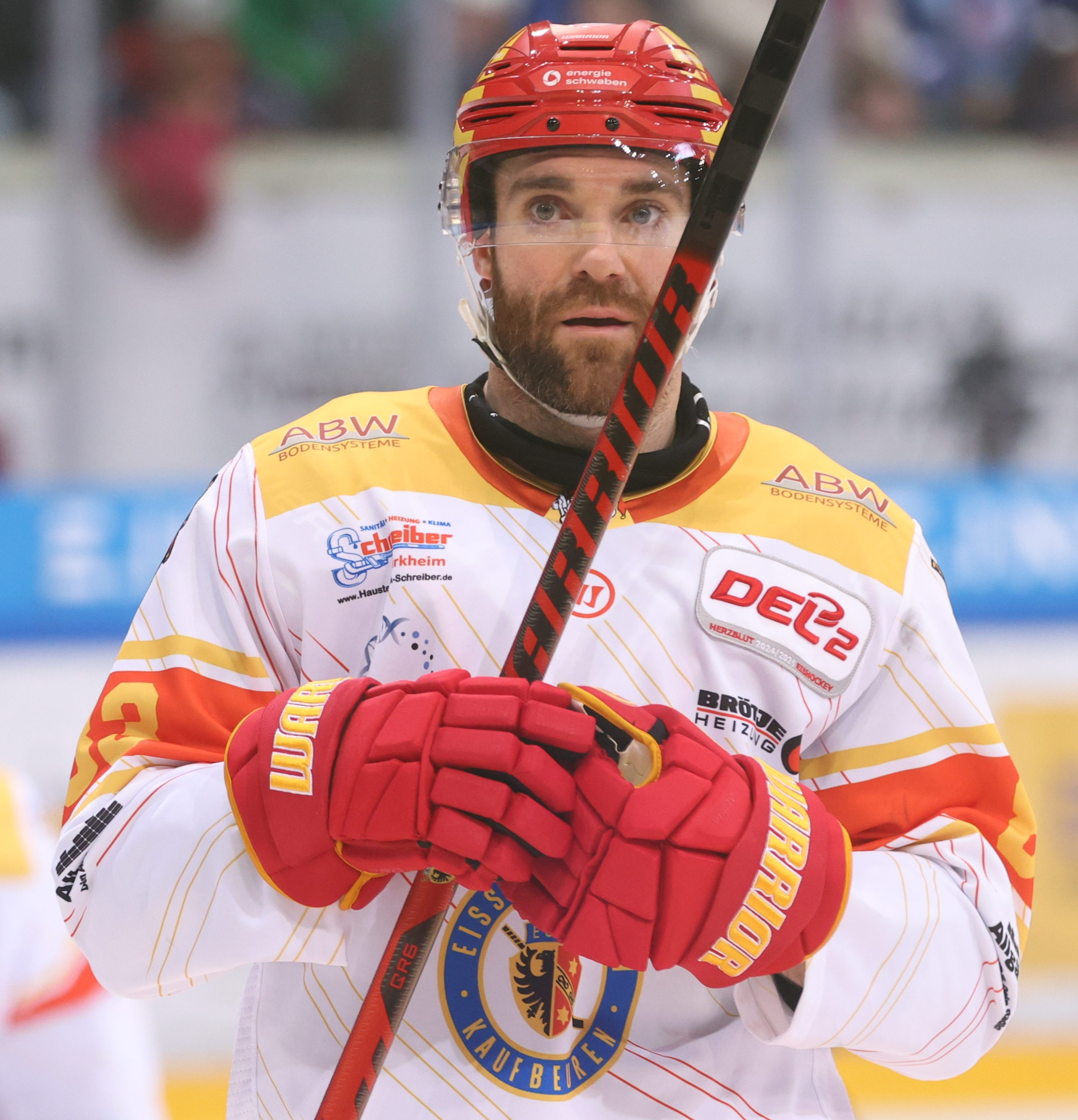
- Born: January 9, 1990 (age 36) Beloeil, Quebec, Canada
- Height: 5 ft 10 in (178 cm)
- Weight: 196 lb (89 kg; 14 st 0 lb)
- Position: Forward
- Shoots: Right
- Magnus team Former teams: Dragons de Rouen; Portland Pirates; Rochester Americans; Tønsberg Vikings; Luleå HF; Mora IK; Stavanger Oilers; Krefeld Pinguine; ESV Kaufbeuren
- NHL draft: 134th overall, 2008; Buffalo Sabres
- Playing career: 2010–present

Jacob Lagacé (born January 9, 1990) is a Canadian professional ice hockey forward who is currently playing for ESV Kaufbeuren of the DEL2 (GER).

== Playing career ==
He was selected by the Buffalo Sabres in the 5th round (134th overall) of the 2008 NHL entry draft. Whilst under contract to Buffalo he previously played in the American Hockey League for Sabres affiliates, the Portland Pirates and the Rochester Americans.

In the 2018–19 season, Lagacé played with the Stavanger Oilers of the Norwegian GET-ligaen. Posting 25 goals and 50 points in 46 games, Lagace continued to produce in the post-season with 7 points in 9 games.

At the conclusion of the season, Lagacé left as a free agent continuing his European career by signing a one-year contract with German outfit, Krefeld Pinguine of the DEL on April 5, 2019. Since the 22/23 season he has a contract with the DEL2 team ESV Kaufbeuren.

== Career statistics ==
=== Regular season and playoffs ===
			Regular season					Playoffs
Season	Team	League	GP	G	A	Pts	PIM	GP	G	A	Pts	PIM
2007–08	Chicoutimi Saguenéens	QMJHL	67	23	39	62	40	6	3	2	5	7
2008–09	Chicoutimi Saguenéens	QMJHL	64	32	37	69	52	4	1	2	3	4
2009–10	Chicoutimi Saguenéens	QMJHL	35	30	23	53	20	—	—	—	—	—
2009–10	Cape Breton Screaming Eagles	QMJHL	25	5	15	20	32	5	0	3	3	4
2009–10	Portland Pirates	AHL	—	—	—	—	—	1	0	0	0	0
2010–11	Portland Pirates	AHL	58	10	13	23	34	3	0	0	0	0
2010–11	Greenville Road Warriors	ECHL	13	0	6	6	0	—	—	—	—	—
2011–12	Rochester Americans	AHL	58	10	10	20	25	—	—	—	—	—
2012–13	Bakersfield Condors	ECHL	57	16	20	36	68	—	—	—	—	—
2012–13	Rochester Americans	AHL	4	0	0	0	2	—	—	—	—	—
2013–14	Orlando Solar Bears	ECHL	26	2	4	6	25	—	—	—	—	—
2013–14	Wheeling Nailers	ECHL	15	4	4	8	8	—	—	—	—	—
2013–14	Tønsberg Vikings	GET	9	5	10	15	6	4	3	2	5	16
2014–15	Asplöven HC	Allsv	52	20	37	57	38	—	—	—	—	—
2015–16	Luleå HF	SHL	50	7	17	24	26	8	0	0	0	0
2016–17	Luleå HF	SHL	49	2	13	15	34	2	1	1	2	0
2017–18	Mora IK	SHL	51	4	13	17	20	4	0	0	0	0
2018–19	Stavanger Oilers	GET	46	25	25	50	72	9	2	5	7	22
2019–20	Krefeld Pinguine	DEL	49	6	10	16	32	—	—	—	—	—
AHL totals			120	20	23	43	61	4	0	0	0	0

=== International ===
Year	Team	Event	Result	GP	G	A	Pts	PIM
2008	Canada	WJC18	1st place, gold medalist(s)	7	1	2	3	10
Junior totals				7	1	2	3	10

== Awards and honours ==
Award	Year
QMJHL
All-Rookie Team	2007–08
