= Alexander Pechursky =

Russian ice hockey player (born 1990)

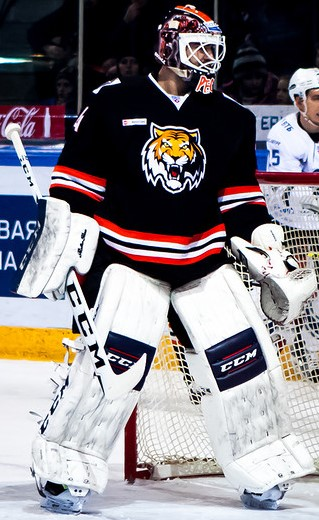
- Pechursky with HC Amur Khabarovsk in 2016
- Born: 4 June 1990 (age 36) Magnitogorsk, Russian SFSR, Soviet Union
- Height: 6 ft 0 in (183 cm)
- Weight: 183 lb (83 kg; 13 st 1 lb)
- Position: Goaltender
- Caught: Left
- Played for: Metallurg Magnitogorsk; Pittsburgh Penguins; Amur Khabarovsk
- NHL draft: 150th overall, 2008; Pittsburgh Penguins
- Playing career: 2007–2020

Alexander Alekseevich Pechursky (Russian: Александр Алексеевич Печурский) (born 4 June 1990) is a Russian former professional ice hockey goaltender. He most recently played for Metallurg Novokuznetsk of the Supreme Hockey League (VHL). Pechurskiy was drafted by the Pittsburgh Penguins 150th overall in the 5th round of the 2008 NHL entry draft. He played one game for the Penguins in 2010. Pechursky then played in the Central Hockey League before returning to Russia.

== Playing career ==
Pechurskiy began his professional career with Metallurg Magnitogorsk of the Russian Superleague in 2007–08, playing in 26 games and posting a 2.07 goals against average. He played for Team Russia at the 2008 IIHF World U18 Championships with a 3.06 GAA and a .8854 save percentage, while Russia earned a silver medal. A month later in the 2008 NHL entry draft, Perchurskiy was selected 150th overall by the Pittsburgh Penguins in the fifth round.

He began the 2009–10 season with Magnitogorsk, but after requesting a release, joined the Tri-City Americans of the major junior Western Hockey League in the United States in December 2009.

On 16 January 2010 Pechurskiy signed an amateur try-out contract with the Penguins due to injuries to starter Marc-André Fleury and back-up Brent Johnson. That night he was to serve as a back-up to the Penguins' third goalie John Curry against the Vancouver Canucks at GM Place. At the time of his signing, Pechurskiy had a 4–1–1 record, with a 1.84 goals against average, a .936 save percentage, and two shutouts in the WHL. After Curry allowed five goals against the Canucks, Pechurskiy entered in relief and became the first Russian goaltender to play for the Penguins. He played the final 35:31 of the game, making 12 saves on 13 shots, and earned the third star of the game. This effort by Pechurskiy tallied him a 0.923 save percentage and a 1.69 goals against average. After the game, Pechurskiy spoke with teammates and media through translations by Ukrainian Ruslan Fedotenko, and Russians Evgeni Malkin and Sergei Gonchar.

Pechurskiy started the 2010–11 season going 2–0–1 with the Americans. On 14 October 2010, the Tri-City Americans announced that they had waived Pechurskiy because of the WHL's mandated limit on overaged players (he was 20 years old at the time).

On 12 November 2010, Pechurskiy signed a contract with the Mississippi RiverKings of the Central Hockey League and began playing regularly for the team. On 25 January 2011, he was signed to a Professional Tryout (PTO) contract with the Wilkes-Barre/Scranton Penguins. Pechurskiy did not make any appearances with the team, and was released from his contract on 31 January 2011 to return to the River Kings.

On 6 June 2011, Pechurskiy returned to his native Russia, securing a contract in a return with Metallurg Magnitogorsk.

== Career statistics ==
| | | | Regular season | | | | | | | | | Playoffs |
| Season | Team | League | GP | W | L | OTL | MIN | GA | SO | GAA | SV% | GP | W | L | MIN | GA | SO | GAA | SV% |
|---|---|---|---|---|---|---|---|---|---|---|---|---|---|---|---|---|---|---|---|
| 2007–08 | Metallurg Magnitogorsk | RUS-3 | 27 | — | — | — | — | 62 | — | — | — | — | — | — | — | — | — | — | — |
| 2007–08 | Metallurg Magnitogorsk | RSL | 1 | — | — | — | 1 | 0 | 0 | 0.00 | — | — | — | — | — | — | — | — | — |
| 2008–09 | Metallurg Magnitogorsk | RUS-3 | 20 | — | — | — | — | 54 | — | — | — | — | — | — | — | — | — | — |
| 2009–10 | Stalnye Lisy | MHL | 5 | 4 | 1 | 0 | 299 | 14 | 0 | 2.81 | .917 | — | — | — | — | — | — | — | — |
| 2009–10 | Metallurg Magnitogorsk | KHL | 1 | 0 | 0 | 0 | 30 | 3 | 0 | 6.00 | .571 | — | — | — | — | — | — | — | — |
| 2009–10 | Tri-City Americans | WHL | 27 | 13 | 10 | 1 | 1403 | 61 | 4 | 2.61 | .912 | 7 | 1 | 2 | 305 | 15 | 0 | 2.95 | .909 |
| 2009–10 | Pittsburgh Penguins | NHL | 1 | 0 | 0 | 0 | 36 | 1 | 0 | 1.67 | .923 | — | — | — | — | — | — | — | — |
| 2010–11 | Tri-City Americans | WHL | 3 | 2 | 0 | 1 | 184 | 11 | 0 | 3.60 | .861 | — | — | — | — | — | — | — | — |
| 2010–11 | Mississippi RiverKings | CHL | 37 | 17 | 14 | 2 | 2030 | 103 | 1 | 3.04 | .894 | 5 | 2 | 3 | — | — | — | 3.45 | .874 |
| 2011–12 | Stalnye Lisy | MHL | 18 | 13 | 2 | 2 | 1024 | 38 | 1 | 2.23 | .922 | 11 | 7 | 4 | 587 | 25 | 0 | 2.55 | .919 |
| 2011–12 | Metallurg Magnitogorsk | KHL | 5 | 0 | 2 | 0 | 259 | 11 | 0 | 2.55 | .914 | — | — | — | — | — | — | — | — |
| 2011–12 | Titan Klin | VHL | 12 | 7 | 2 | 2 | 699 | 27 | 0 | 2.32 | .923 | — | — | — | — | — | — | — | — |
| 2012–13 | Yuzhny Ural Orsk | VHL | 35 | 22 | 11 | 2 | 2062 | 63 | 5 | 1.83 | .935 | — | — | — | — | — | — | — | — |
| 2013–14 | Metallurg Magnitogorsk | KHL | 7 | 3 | 1 | 1 | 272 | 11 | 0 | 2.42 | .913 | 1 | 0 | 0 | 14 | 2 | 0 | 8.46 | .600 |
| 2014–15 | Metallurg Magnitogorsk | KHL | 9 | 2 | 6 | 0 | 400 | 16 | 0 | 2.40 | .910 | — | — | — | — | — | — | — | — |
| 2014–15 | Amur Khabarovsk | KHL | 14 | 2 | 8 | 1 | 703 | 41 | 0 | 3.50 | .893 | — | — | — | — | — | — | — | — |
| 2015–16 | Amur Khabarovsk | KHL | 18 | 6 | 7 | 2 | 936 | 30 | 1 | 1.92 | .936 | — | — | — | — | — | — | — | — |
| 2016–17 | Amur Khabarovsk | KHL | 9 | 0 | 3 | 3 | 257 | 15 | 0 | 3.50 | .874 | — | — | — | — | — | — | — | — |
| 2017–18 | Tsen Tou Jilin | VHL | 38 | 17 | 14 | 0 | 1944 | 81 | 3 | 2.50 | .910 | — | — | — | — | — | — | — | — |
| 2018–19 | Torpedo Ust-Kamenogorsk | VHL | 32 | 13 | 16 | 2 | 1752 | 69 | 0 | 2.36 | .917 | — | — | — | — | — | — | — | — |
| 2018–19 | Altay-Torpedo Ust-Kamenogorsk | KAZ | — | — | — | — | — | — | — | — | — | 1 | — | — | — | — | — | 2.03 | .909 |
| 2019–20 | Metallurg Novokuznetsk | VHL | 11 | 4 | 4 | 2 | 595 | 33 | 0 | 3.33 | .892 | — | — | — | — | — | — | — | — |
| KHL totals | | | 63 | 13 | 27 | 7 | 2858 | 127 | 1 | 2.67 | .910 | 1 | 0 | 0 | 14 | 2 | 0 | 8.46 | .600 |
| NHL totals | | | 1 | 0 | 0 | 0 | 36 | 1 | 0 | 1.67 | .923 | — | — | — | — | — | — | — | — |

=== International ===
| Year | Team | Event | GP | W | L | T | MIN | GA | SO | GAA | SV% |
|---|---|---|---|---|---|---|---|---|---|---|---|
| 2007 | Russia | U18 | 3 | 1 | 0 | 0 | 77 | 5 | 0 | 3.92 | .861 |
| 2008 | Russia | U18 | 5 | 4 | 1 | 0 | 216 | 11 | 0 | 3.06 | .885 |
| Junior totals | | | 8 | 5 | 1 | 0 | 293 | 16 | 0 | 3.28 | .879 |
