= Henrik Björklund =

Swedish ice hockey player

- Born: September 22, 1990 (age 35) Karlstad, Sweden
- Height: 6 ft 2 in (188 cm)
- Weight: 209 lb (95 kg; 14 st 13 lb)
- Position: Forward
- Shoots: Right
- Allsv team Former teams: BIK Karlskoga; Färjestad BK
- NHL draft: 111th overall, 2009; Calgary Flames
- Playing career: 2006–present

Henrik Björklund (born September 22, 1990) is a Swedish professional ice hockey forward. He is currently playing for BIK Karlskoga in the HockeyAllsvenskan (Allsv).

== Playing career ==
During the 2006–07 season, on March 2, 2007 against the Malmö Redhawks, Björklund, then 16, became the youngest player to ever play with Färjestad BK. The rest of the season he played with the club's U18 team and was the team top scorer with 25 points in 14 games. He also won the scoring title for the U18 Allsvenskan league.

Björklund was initially heralded as "the new Håkan Loob" before he was drafted 111th overall by the Calgary Flames in the 2009 NHL entry draft.

On 17 April 2025, Björklund opted to sign a two-year contract in a return with BIK Karlskoga of the Allsvenskan.

== Career statistics ==
=== Regular season and playoffs ===
			Regular season					Playoffs
Season	Team	League	GP	G	A	Pts	PIM	GP	G	A	Pts	PIM
2005–06	Färjestads BK	J18A	10	3	2	5	6	5	1	0	1	2
2006–07	Färjestads BK	J18A	14	13	12	25	53	8	4	3	7	20
2006–07	Färjestads BK	SEL	1	0	0	0	0	—	—	—	—	—
2007–08	Färjestads BK	J18E	15	20	13	33	40	—	—	—	—	—
2007–08	Färjestads BK	J18A	14	11	15	26	64	8	8	3	11	12
2007–08	Färjestads BK	SEL	1	0	0	0	0	2	0	0	0	0
2007–08	Skåre BK	Div.1	17	7	4	11	6	—	—	—	—	—
2008–09	Färjestads BK	SEL	10	0	0	0	0	—	—	—	—	—
2008–09	Skåre BK	Div.1	38	21	14	35	83	—	—	—	—	—
2009–10	Färjestads BK	SEL	19	1	3	4	4	—	—	—	—	—
2009–10	Skåre BK	Div.1	4	1	1	2	4	—	—	—	—	—
2009–10	Borås HC	Allsv	31	6	8	14	51	—	—	—	—	—
2010–11	Färjestads BK	SEL	3	0	1	1	2	—	—	—	—	—
2010–11	Rögle BK	Allsv	51	16	12	28	52	10	2	2	4	6
2011–12	Örebro HK	Allsv	34	6	6	12	14	—	—	—	—	—
2011–12	IF Troja/Ljungby	Allsv	16	3	1	4	16	—	—	—	—	—
2012–13	BIK Karlskoga	Allsv	31	14	22	36	86	2	1	1	2	2
2013–14	BIK Karlskoga	Allsv	42	12	19	31	91	—	—	—	—	—
2014–15	BIK Karlskoga	Allsv	39	14	12	26	38	5	2	0	2	33
2015–16	BIK Karlskoga	Allsv	48	19	13	32	104	5	2	2	4	4
2016–17	Modo Hockey	Allsv	47	20	19	39	48	—	—	—	—	—
2017–18	Modo Hockey	Allsv	38	12	7	19	58	—	—	—	—	—
2018–19	Modo Hockey	Allsv	50	20	17	37	40	5	1	2	3	2
2019–20	Modo Hockey	Allsv	52	20	16	36	22	2	1	0	1	0
2020–21	BIK Karlskoga	Allsv	52	26	30	56	58	11	8	9	17	35
2021–22	BIK Karlskoga	Allsv	40	21	19	40	26	9	3	3	6	2
2022–23	Färjestad BK	SHL	14	5	7	12	8	7	1	1	2	4
2023–24	Färjestad BK	SHL	5	1	1	2	2	4	1	0	1	2
2024–25	Färjestad BK	SHL	51	7	10	17	12	6	0	0	0	4
SHL totals			104	14	22	36	28	19	2	1	3	10

=== International ===
Year	Team	Event	Result	GP	G	A	Pts	PIM
2007	Sweden	WJC18	3rd place, bronze medalist(s)	6	0	0	0	0
2008	Sweden	WJC18	4th	6	2	2	4	4
Junior totals				12	2	2	4	4
