= Corey Trivino =

Canadian ice hockey player

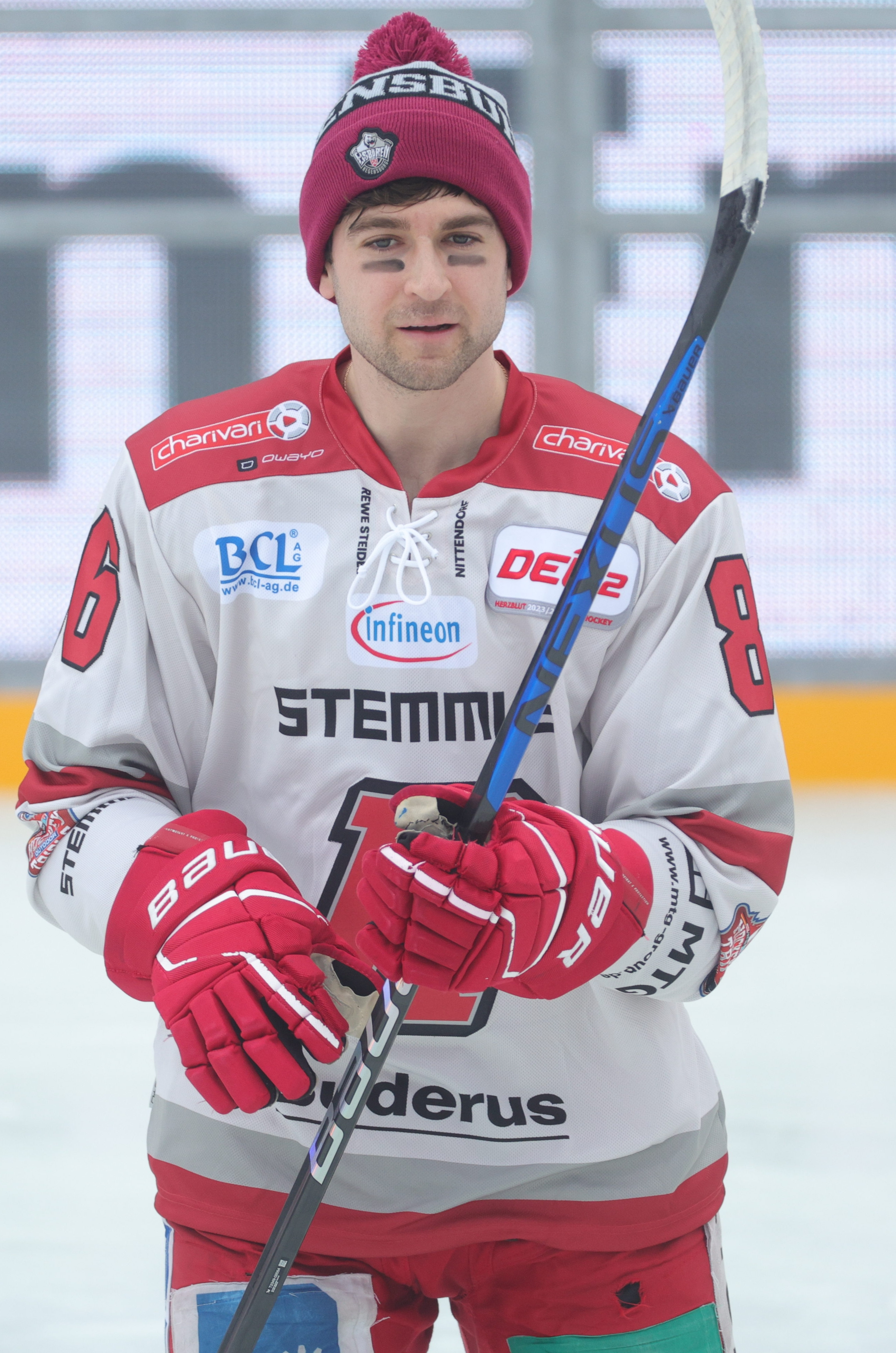
- Trivino in 2024
- Born: January 12, 1990 (age 36) Toronto, Ontario, Canada
- Height: 6 ft 1 in (185 cm)
- Weight: 193 lb (88 kg; 13 st 11 lb)
- Position: Center
- Shoots: Left
- DEL2 team Former teams: Eisbären Regensburg; Portland Pirates; Admiral Vladivostok; Orli Znojmo; Barys Astana; EC VSV; Kassel Huskies
- NHL draft: 36th Overall, 2008; New York Islanders
- Playing career: 2012–present

Corey N. Trivino (born January 12, 1990) is a Canadian professional ice hockey center currently playing for the Eisbären Regensburg of the DEL2. He won a National Championship with Boston University in 2009.

== Playing career ==
Trivino was one of the top producers for his junior team, the Stouffville Spirit, finishing second in scoring twice. His exploits convinced the New York Islanders to select him in the second round of the 2008 NHL entry draft. That fall, he began attending Boston University and joined just in time to help the program win its 5th National Championship. While he provided depth scoring as a freshman, Trivino progressively became more integral to the offense and increased his output each season. During his senior campaign, Trivino broke out as a goal-scoring star and was nearly at a goal-per-game pace through 15 contests.

=== Assault charge ===
Just before Christmas in 2011, Trivino was arrested following an incident at an on-campus dorm. Trivino was charged with three counts of indecent assault, two counts of breaking and entering and one count of assault with attempt to rape. Trivino initially entered a plea of 'not guilty' but was summarily dismissed from the team due to the incident. In August of the following year, Trivino pled guilty to assault and battery charges.

According to the trial report, on the night of December 11, Trivino was at a party in the dorm on Buick Street. A female resident assistant arrived at the room and attempted to enforce 'quiet time'. When she returned to her room, an intoxicated Trivino followed her and pushed his way into her room. He then attempted to force himself on her. After pushing him away from her, he climbed onto her bed and proclaimed that he was going to sleep there. The assistant was eventually able to get Trivino to leave her room. While on his way out of the building Trivino was questioned by campus police, who had just arrived to investigate the incident. A visibly inebriated Trivino identified himself to police and claimed to be a resident of the dorm. When he gave his room number to police, it was actually the number of the assistant who he had just assaulted.

As part of his plea deal, Trivino was given two years probation during which he was drug tested randomly as well as an order to attend weekly Alcoholics Anonymous meetings, receive a mental health evaluation and have no further contact with the victim.

=== Return to the ice ===
After the conclusion of the trial, Trivino attempted to resume his playing career but his hopes of reaching the NHL had been severely damaged. He signed with the Florida Everblades and toiled in the ECHL for most of the next two seasons. He played well enough to earn a full-time promotion to the AHL by 2015 but he wasn't able to score on a consistent basis. Trivino made the decision after the year to continue his playing career in Europe and joined the Admiral Vladivostok of the KHL. He left the team mid-season and finished out the year with Orli Znojmo, helping the club finish as runners-up for the Austrian league championship.

Trivino played two more forgettable years in the KHL before finding a home with the Kassel Huskies of the DEL2. In four years with the team, Trivino was one of the top scorers for the Huskies and helped the club finish as league runners-Up in 2021.

== Career statistics ==
=== Regular season and playoffs ===
| | | | Regular season | | | | | Playoffs |
| Season | Team | League | GP | G | A | Pts | PIM | GP | G | A | Pts | PIM |
|---|---|---|---|---|---|---|---|---|---|---|---|---|
| 2006–07 | Stouffville Spirit | OPJHL | 49 | 24 | 34 | 58 | 24 | — | — | — | — | — |
| 2007–08 | Stouffville Spirit | OPJHL | 39 | 19 | 50 | 69 | 22 | — | — | — | — | — |
| 2008–09 | Boston University | HE | 32 | 6 | 7 | 13 | 14 | — | — | — | — | — |
| 2009–10 | Boston University | HE | 28 | 4 | 11 | 15 | 2 | — | — | — | — | — |
| 2010–11 | Boston University | HE | 37 | 8 | 20 | 28 | 23 | — | — | — | — | — |
| 2011–12 | Boston University | HE | 15 | 13 | 4 | 17 | 6 | — | — | — | — | — |
| 2012–13 | Florida Everblades | ECHL | 63 | 18 | 33 | 51 | 6 | 13 | 3 | 8 | 11 | 2 |
| 2013–14 | Stockton Thunder | ECHL | 46 | 11 | 32 | 43 | 21 | 9 | 0 | 5 | 5 | 6 |
| 2013–14 | Portland Pirates | AHL | 11 | 0 | 4 | 4 | 2 | — | — | — | — | — |
| 2014–15 | Florida Everblades | ECHL | 5 | 6 | 3 | 9 | 5 | 11 | 5 | 3 | 8 | 0 |
| 2014–15 | Portland Pirates | AHL | 39 | 3 | 11 | 14 | 4 | — | — | — | — | — |
| 2015–16 | Admiral Vladivostok | KHL | 12 | 0 | 2 | 2 | 4 | — | — | — | — | — |
| 2015–16 | Orli Znojmo | EBEL | 25 | 7 | 10 | 17 | 0 | 15 | 3 | 10 | 13 | 4 |
| 2016–17 | Barys Astana | KHL | 51 | 9 | 8 | 17 | 20 | 10 | 1 | 3 | 4 | 12 |
| 2017–18 | Barys Astana | KHL | 5 | 0 | 1 | 1 | 4 | — | — | — | — | — |
| 2018–19 | EC VSV | EBEL | 17 | 4 | 3 | 7 | 4 | — | — | — | — | — |
| 2018–19 | Kassel Huskies | DEL2 | 32 | 14 | 18 | 32 | 10 | — | — | — | — | — |
| 2019–20 | Kassel Huskies | DEL2 | 52 | 15 | 39 | 54 | 20 | — | — | — | — | — |
| 2020–21 | Kassel Huskies | DEL2 | 31 | 8 | 36 | 44 | 16 | — | — | — | — | — |
| 2021–22 | Kassel Huskies | DEL2 | 23 | 9 | 15 | 23 | 16 | 7 | 2 | 6 | 8 | 2 |
| 2022–23 | Eisbären Regensburg | DEL2 | 47 | 25 | 26 | 51 | 2 | 2 | 0 | 0 | 0 | 4 |
| KHL totals | | | 68 | 9 | 11 | 20 | 28 | 10 | 1 | 3 | 4 | 12 |
| EBEL totals | | | 138 | 40 | 108 | 148 | 62 | 35 | 5 | 13 | 18 | 24 |

=== International ===
| Year | Team | Event | Result | GP | G | A | Pts | PIM |
|---|---|---|---|---|---|---|---|---|
| 2008 | Canada | U18 | 1st place, gold medalist(s) | 7 | 4 | 3 | 7 | 2 |
| Junior totals | | | | 7 | 4 | 3 | 7 | 2 |
