= Patrick Geering =

Swiss ice hockey player (born 1990)

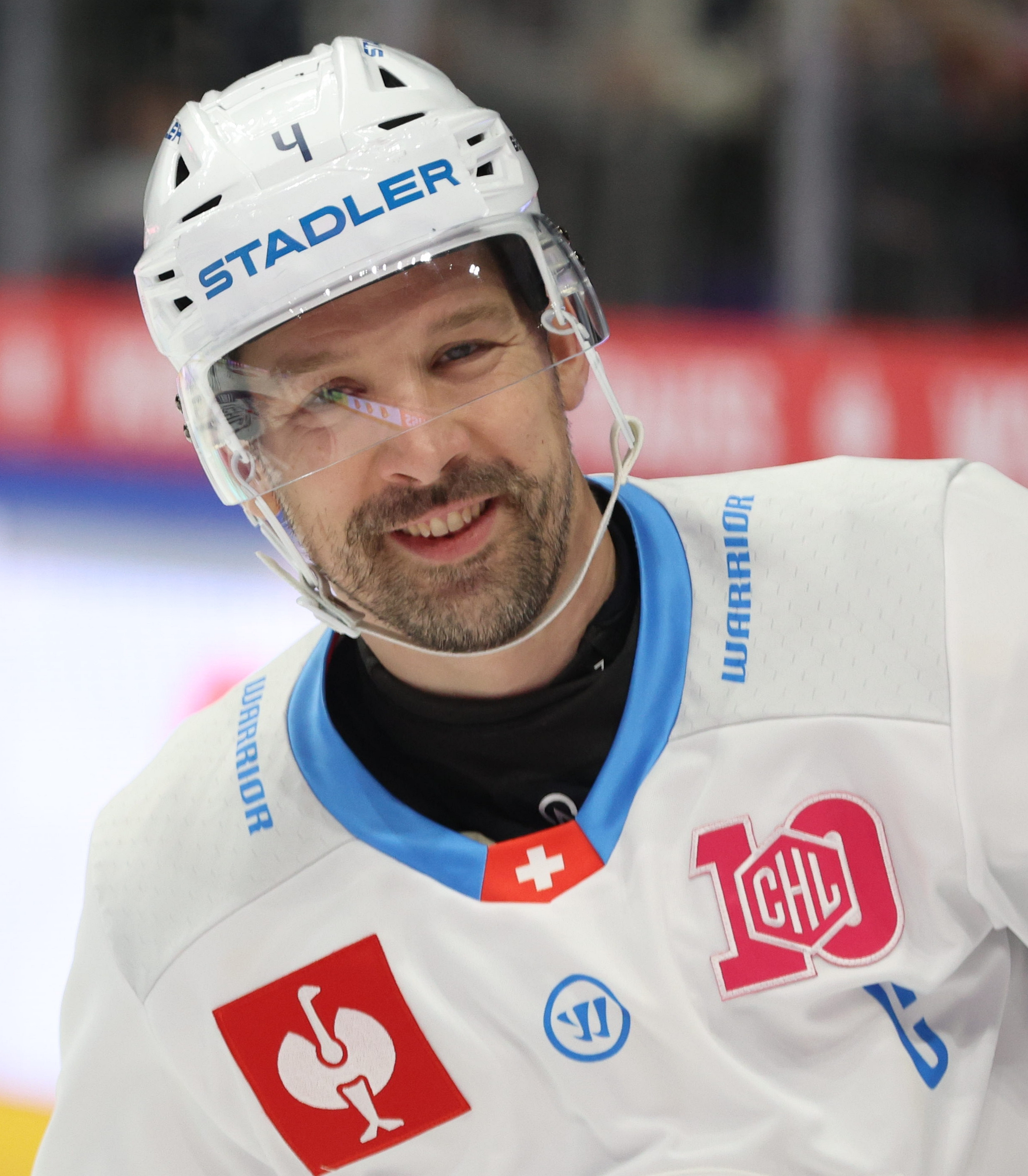
- Geering in 2024
- Born: 12 February 1990 (age 35); Zürich, Switzerland
- Height: 5 ft 10 in (178 cm)
- Weight: 185 lb (84 kg; 13 st 3 lb)
- Position: Defenceman
- Shoots: Left
- NL team: ZSC Lions
- National team: Switzerland
- Playing career: 2007–present

Patrick Geering (born 12 February 1990) is a Swiss professional ice hockey defenceman who currently serves as captain of the ZSC Lions in the National League (NL). He participated at the 2010 IIHF World Championship as a member of the Switzerland men's national ice hockey team.

== Playing career ==
Geering began his career in the youth system of the ZSC Lions. In the 2006–07 season he made his professional debut for GCK Lions in the National League B. In the following season he continued with GCK and the Swiss U-20 national ice hockey team in the National League B. In 2008 he returned to the ZSC Lions for the 2008–09 season in the National League A and appeared in 47 games with five assists. In 2009, Geering participated in the Champions Hockey League, which he won with the ZSC Lions in the finals against Metallurg Magnitogorsk.

On 7 January 2017, Geering was signed to a two-year contract extension by the Lions worth CHF 1.6 million. Prior to the 2017–18 season, Geering replaced Mathias Seger as captain of the ZSC Lions.

== Career statistics ==
=== Regular season and playoffs ===
| | | | Regular season | | | | | Playoffs |
| Season | Team | League | GP | G | A | Pts | PIM | GP | G | A | Pts | PIM |
|---|---|---|---|---|---|---|---|---|---|---|---|---|
| 2005–06 | ZSC Lions | SUI U20 | 30 | 0 | 4 | 4 | 12 | — | — | — | — | — |
| 2006–07 | ZSC Lions | SUI.2 U20 | 9 | 0 | 3 | 3 | 4 | — | — | — | — | — |
| 2006–07 | GCK Lions | SUI U20 | 34 | 2 | 9 | 11 | 18 | 11 | 0 | 2 | 2 | 4 |
| 2006–07 | GCK Lions | SUI.2 | 4 | 1 | 0 | 1 | 4 | — | — | — | — | — |
| 2007–08 | GCK Lions | SUI U20 | 1 | 0 | 0 | 0 | 0 | 10 | 1 | 3 | 4 | 4 |
| 2007–08 | GCK Lions | SUI.2 | 35 | 2 | 13 | 15 | 8 | 3 | 1 | 0 | 1 | 0 |
| 2007–08 | Switzerland U20 | SUI.2 | 3 | 0 | 3 | 3 | 6 | — | — | — | — | — |
| 2008–09 | ZSC Lions | NLA | 47 | 0 | 5 | 5 | 10 | 4 | 0 | 0 | 0 | 2 |
| 2008–09 | Switzerland U20 | SUI.2 | 1 | 0 | 0 | 0 | 0 | — | — | — | — | — |
| 2009–10 | ZSC Lions | NLA | 43 | 0 | 6 | 6 | 8 | 7 | 0 | 0 | 0 | 2 |
| 2010–11 | ZSC Lions | NLA | 50 | 2 | 6 | 8 | 10 | 5 | 0 | 0 | 0 | 2 |
| 2011–12 | ZSC Lions | NLA | 47 | 3 | 15 | 18 | 20 | 15 | 0 | 0 | 0 | 8 |
| 2012–13 | ZSC Lions | NLA | 50 | 6 | 19 | 25 | 26 | 12 | 0 | 6 | 6 | 2 |
| 2013–14 | ZSC Lions | NLA | 49 | 2 | 10 | 12 | 6 | 16 | 0 | 4 | 4 | 27 |
| 2014–15 | ZSC Lions | NLA | 25 | 3 | 5 | 8 | 15 | 18 | 2 | 7 | 9 | 6 |
| 2015–16 | ZSC Lions | NLA | 50 | 3 | 8 | 11 | 20 | 4 | 0 | 1 | 1 | 2 |
| 2016–17 | ZSC Lions | NLA | 50 | 7 | 17 | 24 | 18 | 6 | 1 | 4 | 5 | 4 |
| 2017–18 | ZSC Lions | NL | 44 | 7 | 26 | 33 | 4 | 18 | 3 | 6 | 9 | 6 |
| 2018–19 | ZSC Lions | NL | 37 | 2 | 7 | 9 | 4 | — | — | — | — | — |
| 2019–20 | ZSC Lions | NL | 50 | 1 | 18 | 19 | 16 | — | — | — | — | — |
| 2020–21 | ZSC Lions | NL | 52 | 8 | 19 | 27 | 18 | 9 | 0 | 0 | 0 | 25 |
| 2021–22 | ZSC Lions | NL | 51 | 9 | 12 | 21 | 6 | 18 | 0 | 3 | 3 | 2 |
| NL totals | | | 645 | 53 | 173 | 226 | 166 | 132 | 6 | 31 | 37 | 88 |

=== International ===
| Year | Team | Event | Result | GP | G | A | Pts | PIM |
|---|---|---|---|---|---|---|---|---|
| 2007 | Switzerland | WJC18 | 6th | 6 | 0 | 0 | 0 | 4 |
| 2008 | Switzerland | WJC | 9th | 6 | 0 | 0 | 0 | 0 |
| 2008 | Switzerland | WJC18 | 8th | 6 | 3 | 2 | 5 | 8 |
| 2009 | Switzerland | WJC D1 | 11th | 5 | 0 | 0 | 0 | 2 |
| 2010 | Switzerland | WJC | 4th | 7 | 0 | 5 | 5 | 2 |
| 2010 | Switzerland | WC | 5th | 1 | 0 | 0 | 0 | 0 |
| 2015 | Switzerland | WC | 8th | 8 | 0 | 0 | 0 | 2 |
| 2016 | Switzerland | WC | 11th | 7 | 0 | 1 | 1 | 4 |
| 2018 | Switzerland | OG | 10th | 4 | 0 | 2 | 2 | 0 |
| Junior totals | | | | 30 | 3 | 7 | 10 | 16 |
| Senior totals | | | | 20 | 0 | 3 | 3 | 6 |
