= Tomáš Hričina =

Slovak ice hockey forward

- Born: May 31, 1990 (age 34); Košice, Czechoslovakia
- Height: 6 ft 2 in (188 cm)
- Weight: 198 lb (90 kg; 14 st 2 lb)
- Position: Forward
- Shoots: Left
- Tipsport Liga team Former teams: HK Dukla Michalovce; HC Košice; HC '05 Banská Bystrica
- Playing career: 2010–present

Tomáš Hričina (born May 31, 1990) is a Slovak professional ice hockey forward who currently plays for HK Dukla Michalovce in the Tipsport Liga.

== Career ==
Hričina began his career with HC Košice's junior teams before moving to North America's Canadian Hockey League where he was drafted 27th overall by the Western Hockey League's Regina Pats in the 2008 CHL Import Draft. He played two seasons with the Pats before returning to Košice in 2010.

He divided the 2010-11 season with Košice and HC 46 Bardejov of the Slovak 1. Liga before playing for HC '05 Banská Bystrica in the 2011-12 season. After spending most of the next three season with Bardejov, Hričina became a full-fledged member of Košice's roster in 2015.

On May 30, 2019, Hričina joined newly-promoted HK Dukla Michalovce for the 2019–20 Slovak Extraliga season.
