= Joakim Mattsson =

Swedish ice hockey player (born 1990)

- Born: January 24, 1990 (age 35) Kramfors, Sweden
- Height: 5 ft 11 in (180 cm)
- Weight: 172 lb (78 kg; 12 st 4 lb)
- Position: Centre
- Shot: Left
- Played for: Kramfors-Alliansen; Modo Hockey; IF Sundsvall Hockey; Timrå IK
- Playing career: 2008–2016

Joakim Mattsson (born January 24, 1990) is a Swedish professional ice hockey player. He played with Timrå IK in the Elitserien during the 2010–11 Elitserien season.

== Career statistics ==
			Regular season					Playoffs
Season	Team	League	GP	G	A	Pts	PIM	GP	G	A	Pts	PIM
2005–06	Kramfors-Alliansen	Division 1	22	0	5	5	51	—	—	—	—	—
2006–07	MODO Hockey J18	J18 Allsvenskan	4	2	2	4	4	—	—	—	—	—
2006–07	MODO Hockey J20	J20 SuperElit	30	1	10	11	73	5	0	0	0	4
2007–08	MODO Hockey J18	J18 Elit	1	0	0	0	2	—	—	—	—	—
2007–08	MODO Hockey J18	J18 Allsvenskan	5	1	4	5	26	—	—	—	—	—
2007–08	MODO Hockey J20	J20 SuperElit	40	4	19	23	122	5	0	2	2	8
2008–09	MODO Hockey J20	J20 SuperElit	36	10	11	21	155	5	0	1	1	4
2008–09	MODO Hockey	Elitserien	11	0	0	0	2	—	—	—	—	—
2009–10	MODO Hockey J20	J20 SuperElit	1	0	1	1	0	—	—	—	—	—
2009–10	MODO Hockey	Elitserien	7	0	0	0	0	—	—	—	—	—
2009–10	IF Sundsvall Hockey	HockeyAllsvenskan	41	9	8	17	46	—	—	—	—	—
2010–11	IF Sundsvall Hockey	HockeyAllsvenskan	47	6	11	17	46	—	—	—	—	—
2010–11	Timrå IK	Elitserien	1	0	0	0	0	—	—	—	—	—
2011–12	IF Sundsvall Hockey	HockeyAllsvenskan	50	6	6	12	77	—	—	—	—	—
2012–13	IF Sundsvall Hockey	Hockeyettan	41	10	19	29	79	3	0	0	0	2
2013–14	IF Sundsvall Hockey	Hockeyettan	43	17	20	37	32	2	0	0	0	2
2014–15	IF Sundsvall Hockey	Hockeyettan	33	5	10	15	34	10	0	1	1	16
2015–16	IF Sundsvall Hockey	HockeyAllsvenskan	45	3	6	9	56	—	—	—	—	—
Elitserien totals			19	0	0	0	2	—	—	—	—	—
HockeyAllsvenskan totals			183	24	31	55	225	—	—	—	—	—
Division 1 (Hockeyettan) totals			139	32	54	86	196	15	0	1	1	20
