= Pavel Chernov =

Russian professional ice hockey player

- Born: 30 January 1990 (age 35); Novopolotsk, Belarus
- Height: 5 ft 11 in (180 cm)
- Weight: 192 lb (87 kg; 13 st 10 lb)
- Position: Forward
- Shoots: Right
- BLR team Former teams: Shakhter Soligorsk; Atlant Moscow Oblast; HC Vityaz; Severstal Cherepovets; Dinamo Riga; Spartak Moscow
- Playing career: 2006–present

Pavel Chernov (born 30 January 1990) is a Russian professional ice hockey player. He is currently playing with Shakhter Soligorsk of the Belarusian Extraleague (BLR).

== Playing career ==
Chernov played with HC Vityaz Podolsk of the Kontinental Hockey League (KHL) during the 2012–13 season.

After five seasons with Severstal Cherepovets, Chernov returned to Vityaz Podolsk as a free agent, in securing a two-year contract on May 4, 2018.

On 3 August 2020, Chernov joined Latvian based KHL club, Dinamo Riga, on a one-year contract.
