= Yevgeni Solomonov =

Belarusian ice hockey player

- Born: May 9, 1990 (age 34); Gomel, Belarus
- Height: 5 ft 10 in (178 cm)
- Weight: 163 lb (74 kg; 11 st 9 lb)
- Position: Forward
- Shoots: Left
- KHL team Former teams: Avtomobilist Yekaterinburg; HK Gomel
- National team: Belarus
- NHL draft: Undrafted
- Playing career: 2007–present

Yevgeni Solomonov (born May 9, 1990) is a Belarusian ice hockey player who is currently playing for Avtomobilist Yekaterinburg in the Kontinental Hockey League (KHL). He previously played in his native Belarus with HK Gomel of the Belarusian Extraliga.

Solomonov competed in the 2013 IIHF World Championship as a member of the Belarus men's national ice hockey team.
