= Benedikt Brueckner =

German ice hockey player

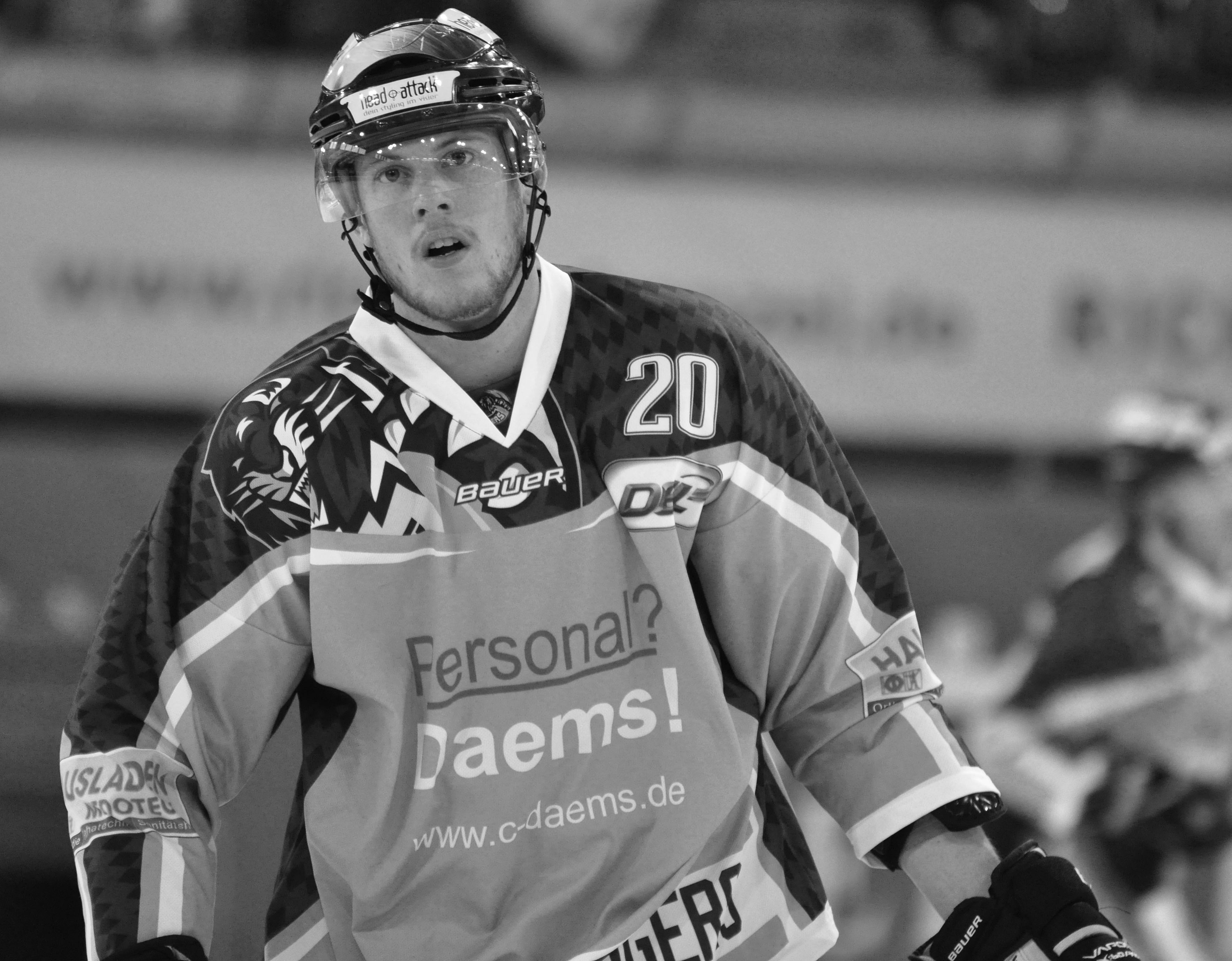
- Born: 1 January 1990 (age 36) Marktoberdorf, Germany
- Height: 6 ft 1 in (185 cm)
- Weight: 181 lb (82 kg; 12 st 13 lb)
- Position: Defence
- Shoots: Left
- DEL team Former teams: Schwenninger Wild Wings; Adler Mannheim; Straubing Tigers; EHC München
- NHL draft: Undrafted
- Playing career: 2008–present

Benedikt Brueckner (born 1 January 1990) is a German professional ice hockey defenceman. He is currently playing for Schwenninger Wild Wings in the Deutsche Eishockey Liga (DEL). Brueckner has previously played in the DEL with Adler Mannheim and the Straubing Tigers On 7 May 2013, after two seasons with the Tigers, Brueckner signed a one-year contract with DEL rival, EHC München. After two seasons with Red Bull, Brueckner signed a two-year contract with his fourth DEL club, Schwenninger Wild Wings on 23 March 2015.
