= Marek Lisoň =

Slovak ice hockey player

- Born: 15 September 1990 (age 34); Bratislava, Czechoslovakia
- Height: 6 ft 0 in (183 cm)
- Position: Left wing
- Slovak Extraliga team: HC Slovan Bratislava
- Playing career: 2005–present

Marek Lisoň (born 15 September 1990) is a Slovak professional ice hockey player who played with HC Slovan Bratislava in the Slovak Extraliga.
