= Justin Florek =

American professional ice hockey player

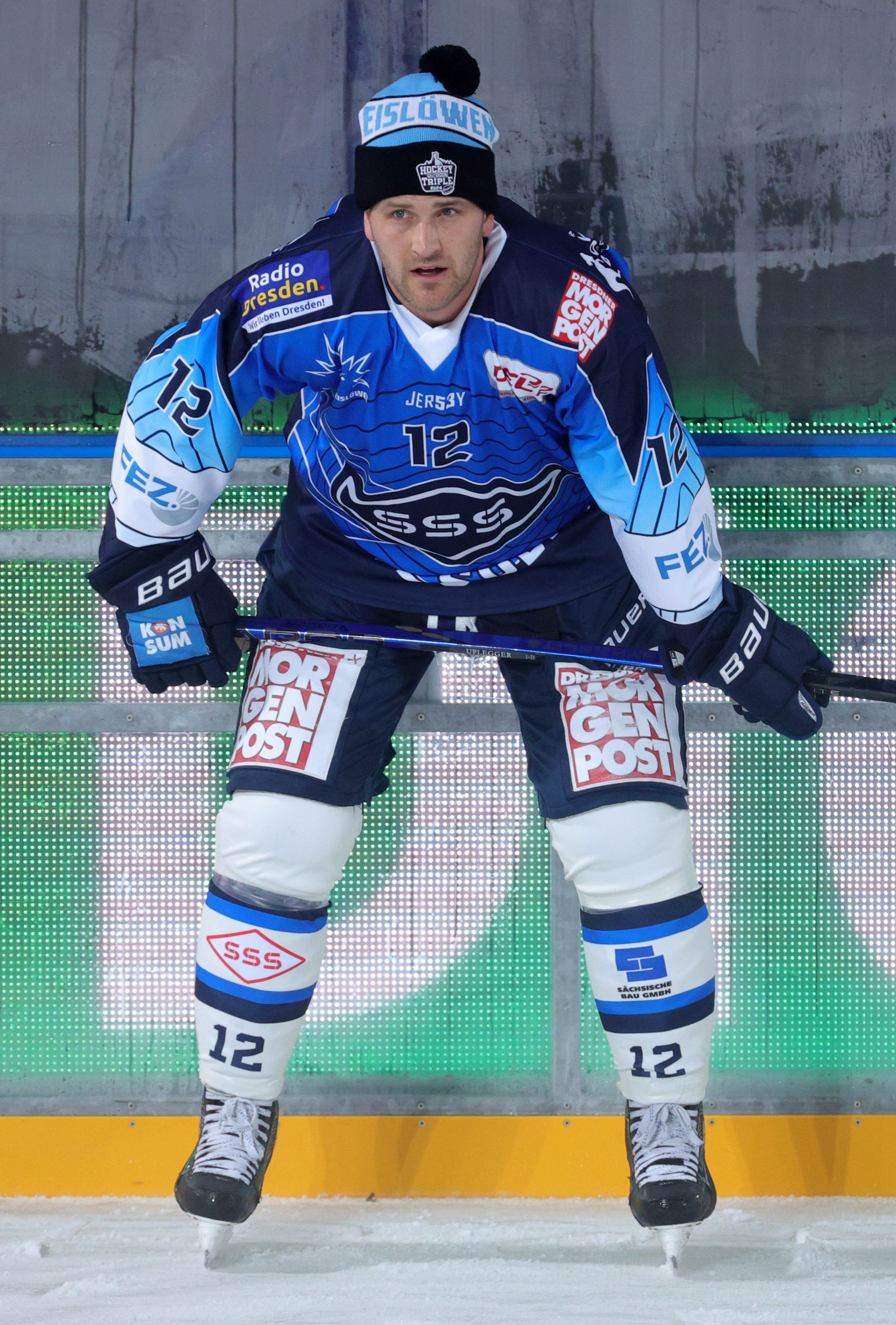
- Justin Florek in 2024
- Born: May 18, 1990 (age 36) Marquette, Michigan, U.S.
- Height: 6 ft 4 in (193 cm)
- Weight: 194 lb (88 kg; 13 st 12 lb)
- Position: Left wing
- Shoots: Left
- team Former teams: Free agent Boston Bruins; Iserlohn Roosters; EHC Black Wings Linz
- NHL draft: 135th overall, 2010; Boston Bruins
- Playing career: 2012–present

Justin Jacob Florek (born May 18, 1990) is a former American professional ice hockey player who is currently an unrestricted free agent. He last played with Dresdner Eislöwen in the DEL2. Florek was selected by the Boston Bruins in the 5th round (135th overall) of the 2010 NHL entry draft.

== Playing career ==
=== Collegiate ===
Florek played junior hockey for the USA Hockey National Team Development Program for both the under-17 and under-18 teams before moving on to the Northern Michigan University Wildcats ice hockey program. While at Northern Michigan, Florek played 157 games, scoring 53 goals and 63 assists for 116 points. Florek was named an alternate captain of the team for the 2010–11 season and captain for the 2011–12 season. During his collegiate career, he led NMU in game winning goals in the 2009–10, 2010–11 and 2011–12 season, and led the team in power play goals with nine during the 2011–12 season. Florek was named to the CCHA Second All-Star team and was named a finalist for the CCHA Best Defensive Forward Award for the 2011–12 season.

=== Professional ===
==== Boston Bruins ====
Following his final season with the Wildcats, Florek signed an entry-level contract with the Bruins on March 25, 2012, and was assigned to the Providence Bruins of the AHL for the rest of the season.

Florek attended the Boston Bruins training camp prior to the 2012–13 NHL season, but was assigned to Providence on September 14, 2012. Florek played 71 games with Providence scoring 11 goals and 16 assists for 27 points in the regular season and played 12 playoff games scoring one goal and two assists for three points before they were eliminated in the conference finals by the Wilkes-Barre/Scranton Penguins.

On September 22, 2013, Florek was again assigned to Providence to begin the 2013–14, but played in four NHL games for Boston during the 2013–14 regular season. On January 4, 2014 Florek made his NHL debut, playing for the Bruins in a 4–1 win against the Winnipeg Jets. Florek was reassigned to Providence again on January 5, 2014. Florek scored his first NHL goal on January 9, 2014, against Jonathan Quick of the Los Angeles Kings, in a game the Bruins lost 4-2 to the Kings.

On April 20, 2014, Florek scored his first NHL playoff goal during the opening round of the 2014 Stanley Cup Playoffs, as Boston defeated the visiting Detroit Red Wings 4–1 in the second game of the series.

Florek attended the Bruins training camp for the start of the 2014-2015 NHL Season but was assigned to Providence on October 1, 2014.

==== New York Islanders ====
On July 2, 2015, Florek left the Bruins as a free agent to sign a one-year, two-way contract with the New York Islanders. He was assigned to AHL affiliate, the Bridgeport Sound Tigers for the duration of the 2015–16 season. He appeared in every game with the Sound Tigers, producing a career low 16 points.

==== Milwaukee Admirals ====
As an unsigned free agent over the summer, Florek was unable to attract NHL interest. On October 8, 2016, he signed a one-year AHL contract with the Milwaukee Admirals, affiliate to the Nashville Predators. In the 2016–17 season, Florek contributed with 12 goals and 30 points in 75 games for the Admirals.

==== Iserlohn Roosters ====
On May 19, 2017, as a free agent, he inked a one-year deal with his first European club, the Iserlohn Roosters of the German top-tier Deutsche Eishockey Liga (DEL).

Florek served as the Roosters captain for the 2018–19 season.

==== EHC Black Wings Linz ====
Florek left the Roosters to sign a one-year contract with the EHC Black Wings Linz in the neighbouring Austrian Hockey League (EBEL), on May 14, 2019.

==== South Carolina Stingrays ====
After three seasons in Europe, Florek as a free agent opted to return to North America by agreeing to a contract with the South Carolina Stingrays of the ECHL on September 3, 2020.

Florek found success in his return to North America, scoring 19 goals and 41 assists for a professional career-high 41 points in his first season. He would help the Stingrays reach the Kelly Cup Finals, where they would lose to the Fort Wayne Komets in four games.

After being named an alternate captain of the Stingrays, Florek would break his recently set career high in points the following season, scoring 22 goals and 25 assists for 47 points.

==== Dresdner Eislöwen ====
After three years with the Stingrays, Florek returned to Europe, signing with the Dresdner Eislöwen in the DEL2.

== Career statistics ==
=== Regular season and playoffs ===
			Regular season					Playoffs
Season	Team	League	GP	G	A	Pts	PIM	GP	G	A	Pts	PIM
2008–09	Northern Michigan University	CCHA	40	9	8	17	6	—	—	—	—	—
2009–10	Northern Michigan University	CCHA	41	12	23	35	22	—	—	—	—	—
2010–11	Northern Michigan University	CCHA	39	13	15	28	14	—	—	—	—	—
2011–12	Northern Michigan University	CCHA	37	19	17	36	18	—	—	—	—	—
2011–12	Providence Bruins	AHL	8	2	2	4	2	—	—	—	—	—
2012–13	Providence Bruins	AHL	71	11	16	27	37	12	1	2	3	4
2013–14	Providence Bruins	AHL	69	19	19	38	27	4	1	0	1	0
2013–14	Boston Bruins	NHL	4	1	1	2	0	6	1	0	1	4
2014–15	Providence Bruins	AHL	73	11	24	35	33	5	0	0	0	2
2015–16	Bridgeport Sound Tigers	AHL	76	7	9	16	31	3	1	0	1	0
2016–17	Milwaukee Admirals	AHL	75	12	18	30	12	3	0	0	0	2
2017–18	Iserlohn Roosters	DEL	51	9	12	21	22	2	0	0	0	0
2018–19	Iserlohn Roosters	DEL	52	10	11	21	22	—	—	—	—	—
2019–20	EHC Black Wings Linz	EBEL	48	8	17	25	42	3	0	1	1	0
2020–21	South Carolina Stingrays	ECHL	65	19	22	41	29	13	4	2	6	12
2021–22	South Carolina Stingrays	ECHL	69	22	25	47	34	—	—	—	—	—
2022–23	South Carolina Stingrays	ECHL	65	17	24	41	57	6	0	2	2	4
2023–24	Dresdner Eislöwen	DEL2	13	6	3	9	8	—	—	—	—	—
NHL totals			4	1	1	2	0	6	1	0	1	4

=== International ===
Year	Team	Event	Result	GP	G	A	Pts	PIM
2008	United States	WJC18	3rd place, bronze medalist(s)	7	3	0	3	4
Junior totals				7	3	0	3	4

== Awards and honors ==
Award	Year
College
CCHA Second All-Star Team	2012
