= Lucas Sandström =

Swedish ice hockey winger (born 1990)

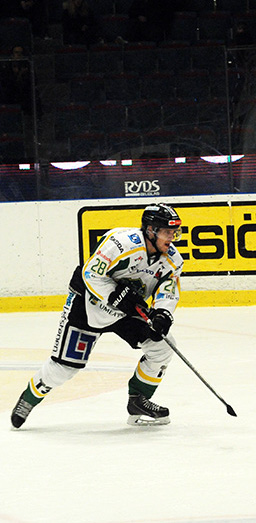
- Sandström during a HockeyAllsvenskan game vs. AIK
- Born: March 23, 1990 (age 34); Fagersta, Sweden
- Height: 5 ft 10 in (178 cm)
- Weight: 181 lb (82 kg; 12 st 13 lb)
- Position: Winger
- Shoots: Left
- EIHL team Former teams: Sheffield Steelers; Mora IK
- Playing career: 2008–present

Lucas Sandström (born March 23, 1990) is a Swedish professional ice hockey winger who plays for the Sheffield Steelers of the Elite Ice Hockey League (EIHL).

Sandström previously played five regular season games in the Elitserien for Mora IK during the 2007–08 season where he scored no points. On September 24, 2019, Sandström signed for the Sheffield Steelers of the United Kingdom's Elite Ice Hockey League as a replacement for Martin St. Pierre following his release from the team.

He is the nephew of former NHL player Tomas Sandström.
