= 2007 IIHF World U18 Championships =

2007 IIHF World U18 Championship

Tournament details
- Host country: Finland
- Venue(s): 2 (in 2 host cities)
- Dates: 11–22 April 2007
- Teams: 10

Final positions
- Champions: Russia (3rd title)
- Runner-up: United States
- Third place: Sweden
- Fourth place: Canada

Tournament statistics
- Games played: 31
- Goals scored: 210 (6.77 per game)
- Attendance: 53,312 (1,720 per game)
- Scoring leader(s): (United States) James van Riemsdyk (United States) Colin Wilson (12 points)

Awards
- MVP: (United States) James van Riemsdyk

The 2007 IIHF World U18 Championships was an ice hockey tournament held in Rauma and Tampere, Finland. The championships began on April 11, 2007, and finished on April 22, 2007. Games were played at Äijänsuo Arena in Rauma and Tampere Ice Stadium in Tampere. Russia defeated the United States 6–5 in the final to claim the gold medal, while Sweden defeated Canada 8–3 to capture the bronze medal.

== Top Division ==
=== Preliminary round ===
==== Group A ====
Pos	Team	Pld	W	OTW	OTL	L	GF	GA	GD	Pts	Qualification
1	Canada	4	3	1	0	0	24	8	+16	11	Semifinals
2	Russia	4	3	0	0	1	16	12	+4	9	Quarterfinals
3	United States	4	2	0	1	1	22	9	+13	7	Quarterfinals
4	Germany	4	1	0	0	3	8	21	−13	3	Relegation round
5	Latvia	4	0	0	0	4	6	26	−20	0	Relegation round

Source: IIHF

12 April 2007; 16:00	Canada	7–3 (3–1, 2–1, 2–1)	Germany	Äijänsuo Arena, Rauma; Attendance: 1,490

Game reference
S. Stamkos (ES) 00:59; Y. Bastien (SH) 02:14; J. Arniel (PP) 06:39; C. Gillies (ES) 33:06; L. Schenn (PP) 37:32; D. Doughty (PP) 50:22; B. Sutter (ES) 53:30 / Goals / 13:12 (ES) M. Buchwieser; 29:32 (ES) P. Geiger; 46:56 (ES) J. Flaake

12 April 2007; 19:30	Russia	5–3 (1–1, 1–1, 3–1)	United States	Äijänsuo Arena, Rauma; Attendance: 1,639

Game reference
N. Filatov (ES) 17:35; S. Korostin (PP) 23:44; D. Kugryshev (ES) 48:00; D. Kagarlitskiy (ES) 52:42; N. Lukyanchikov (EN) 59:33 / Goals / 03:00 (PP) J. O'Brien; 37:40 (PP) J. Schroeder; 54:38 (ES) J. O'Brien

13 April 2007; 16:00	Germany	1–9 (0–5, 1–2, 0–2)	United States	Äijänsuo Arena, Rauma; Attendance: 1,244

Game reference
A. Oblinger (ES) 25:54 / Goals / 03:26 (ES) M. Rust; 06:40 (PP) J. Schroeder; 17:28 (ES) I. Cole; 17:41 (ES) M. Rust; 18:26 (ES) C. Fairchild; 27:23 (PP) J. Schroeder; 29:06 (ES) J. Albert; 49:14 (PP) I. Cole; 50:21 (PP) J. Hayes

13 April 2007; 19:30	Russia	6–3 (2–0, 2–2, 2–1)	Latvia	Äijänsuo Arena, Rauma; Attendance: 1,370

Game reference
A. Loktionov (ES) 06:37; N. Filatov (ES) 13:18; A. Cherepanov (PP) 26:34; M. Chudinov (PP) 37:55; S. Korostin (ES) 47:14; E. Averin (ES) 52:25 / Goals / 28:04 (ES) E. Lipsbergs; 29:06 (PP) J. Straupe; 44:41 (ES) S. Daņilovs

14 April 2007; 16:00	Latvia	1–9 (0–4, 0–2, 1–3)	Canada	Äijänsuo Arena, Rauma; Attendance: 1,156

Game reference
J. Straupe (ES) 54:29 / Goals / 01:13 (ES) K. Turris; 07:15 (ES) L. Schenn; 11:51 (ES) J. Arniel; 12:20 (ES) D. Knelsen; 29:17 (ES) L. Couture; 37:57 (ES) D. Knelsen; 43:42 (ES) Y. Bastien; 58:44 (ES) L. Couture; 59:07 (ES) K. Turris

15 April 2007; 15:00	Germany	1–3 (0–0, 0–1, 1–2)	Russia	Äijänsuo Arena, Rauma; Attendance: 2,031

Game reference
J. Flaake (ES) 51:26 / Goals / 24:43 (ES) M. Chudinov; 52:10 (ES) A. Cherepanov; 59:19 (ES) N. Klyukin

15 April 2007; 18:30	United States	2–3 GWS (0–0, 2–1, 0–1); OT: (0–0); SO: (0–1)	Canada	Äijänsuo Arena, Rauma; Attendance: 2,631

Game reference
J. van Riemsdyk (ES) 25:00; J. Vaive (ES) 53:35 / Goals / 08:45 (ES) L. Schenn; 56:13 (ES) C. Gillies; 65:00 (SO) Z. Boychuk

16 April 2007; 16:00	Latvia	2–3 (0–2, 2–0, 0–1)	Germany	Äijänsuo Arena, Rauma; Attendance: 1,008

Game reference
J. Ozolins (PP) 34:20; L. Bajaruns (ES) 34:37 / Goals / 03:03 (ES) J. Flaake; 14:14 (PP) D. Reul; 50:19 (ES) S. Rupprich

17 April 2007; 16:00	United States	8–0 (4–0, 1–0, 3–0)	Latvia	Äijänsuo Arena, Rauma; Attendance: 2,032

Game reference
P. White (ES) 05:28; J. van Riemsdyk (ES) 10:27; J. Vaive (ES) 11:40; C. Severyn (ES) 14:53; P. White (PP) 30:43; J. Vaive (ES) 41:54; C. Wilson (ES) 49:13; R. Hayes (ES) 52:07 / Goals

17 April 2007; 19:30	Canada	5–2 (1–1, 3–1, 1–0)	Russia	Äijänsuo Arena, Rauma; Attendance: 2,568

Game reference
J. Arniel (ES) 16:45; Z. Boychuk (ES) 20:59; A. Esposito (ES) 28:36; Y. Bastien (ES) 29:40; S. Stamkos (PP) 40:51 / Goals / 12:05 (ES) E. Dadonov; 38:37 (ES) S. Korostin

==== Group B ====
Pos	Team	Pld	W	OTW	OTL	L	GF	GA	GD	Pts	Qualification
1	Sweden	4	2	1	0	1	10	7	+3	8	Semifinals
2	Slovakia	4	2	0	1	1	9	10	−1	7	Quarterfinals
3	Switzerland	4	2	0	0	2	11	7	+4	6	Quarterfinals
4	Czech Republic	4	1	1	0	2	9	11	−2	5	Relegation round
5	Finland (H)	4	1	0	1	2	6	10	−4	4	Relegation round

Source: IIHF
(H) Host

11 April 2007; 17:30	Sweden	2–1 GWS	Finland	Äijänsuo Arena, Rauma; Attendance: 4,323

Game reference
J. Andersson (SH) 15:23; M. Backlund (SO) 65:00 / Goals / 03:34 (PP) O. Vauhkonen

12 April 2007; 15:00	Czech Republic	4–2	Switzerland	Tampere Ice Stadium, Tampere; Attendance: 1,535

Game reference
T. Knotek (ES) 17:27; V. Roth (SH) 27:00; Š. Novotný (PP) 30:40; T. Kubalík (PP) 35:44 / Goals / 08:25 (PP) L. Cunti; 52:16 (PP) Y. Blaser

13 April 2007; 16:00	Sweden	3–6	Slovakia	Tampere Ice Stadium, Tampere; Attendance: 1,298

Game reference
E. Bejmo (ES) 17:22; V. Hedman (PP) 40:26; M. Backlund (PP) 58:57 / Goals / 08:17 (PP) B. Horvath; 21:39 (PP) M. Daloga; 31:16 (PP) B. Horvath; 38:07 (PP) M. Kytnár; 52:20 (ES) M. Štěpán; 55:18 (EN) M. Mišura

13 April 2007; 19:30	Switzerland	5–1	Finland	Tampere Ice Stadium, Tampere; Attendance: 2,702

Game reference
R. Josi (ES) 11:47; E. Froidevaux (PP) 17:02; G. Sciaroni (PP) 27:20; G. Sciaroni (ES) 35:52; P. Berger (ES) 51:26 / Goals / 00:55 (PP) J. Liljeblad

14 April 2007; 15:00	Slovakia	2–3 GWS	Czech Republic	Tampere Ice Stadium, Tampere; Attendance: 1,648

Game reference
J. Molnár (PP) 32:49; A. Bezak (ES) 35:46 / Goals / 29:10 (ES) V. Růžička; 49:13 (ES) O. Roman; 65:00 (SO) R. Szturc

15 April 2007; 15:00	Switzerland	0–2	Sweden	Tampere Ice Stadium, Tampere; Attendance: 1,890

Game reference
Goals / 22:47 (ES) O. Möller; 28:07 (PP) C. Gustafsson

15 April 2007; 18:30	Finland	4–2	Czech Republic	Tampere Ice Stadium, Tampere; Attendance: 4,220

Game reference
T. Sallinen (ES) 03:45; T. Sallinen (ES) 12:18; N. Kluuskeri (ES) 12:56; N. Lucenius (PP) 16:28 / Goals / 03:11 (ES) V. Růžička; 35:06 (ES) D. Stich

16 April 2007; 15:00	Slovakia	0–4	Switzerland	Tampere Ice Stadium, Tampere; Attendance: 1,401

Game reference
Goals / 02:04 (PP) L. Cunti; 33:38 (PP) G. Donati; 49:08 (PP) L. Cunti; 52:32 (ES) R. Schlagenhauf

17 April 2007; 16:00	Czech Republic	0–3	Sweden	Tampere Ice Stadium, Tampere; Attendance: 918

Game reference
Goals / 12:41 (ES) M. Tedenby; 46:29 (PP) C. Gustafsson; 58:15 (ES) M. Tedenby

17 April 2007; 19:30	Finland	0–1	Slovakia	Tampere Ice Stadium, Tampere; Attendance: 2,590

Game reference
Goals / 24:21 (ES) O. Rusnák

=== Relegation round ===
Pos	Team	Pld	W	OTW	OTL	L	GF	GA	GD	Pts	Relegation
7	Finland (H)	3	3	0	0	0	14	8	+6	9	
8	Germany	3	2	0	0	1	12	9	+3	6	
9	Czech Republic	3	1	0	0	2	9	11	−2	3	2008 Division I
10	Latvia	3	0	0	0	3	6	13	−7	0	2008 Division I

Source: IIHF
(H) Host

19 April 2007; 15:00	Czech Republic	4–1 (1–0, 2–0, 1–1)	Latvia	Äijänsuo Arena, Rauma; Attendance: 979

Game reference
J. Voráček (ES) 08:41; R. Valchař (ES) 26:04; R. Ostrčil (SH) 36:30; O. Roman (ES) 48:32 / Goals / 52:38 (ES) J. Straupe

19 April 2007; 18:30	Germany	3–4 (1–2, 2–1, 0–1)	Finland	Äijänsuo Arena, Rauma; Attendance: 1,405

Game reference
G. Fauser (ES) 07:50; P. Geiger (PP) 27:27; D. Weiss (ES) 32:38 / Goals / 01:02 (ES) E. Pöysti; 15:16 (ES) O. Vauhkonen; 21:58 (PP) E. Pöysti; 55:50 (ES) A. Kokkonen

20 April 2007; 15:00	Germany	6–3 (1–2, 2–1, 3–0)	Czech Republic	Äijänsuo Arena, Rauma; Attendance: 731

Game reference
J. Flaake (ES) 13:10; A. Uuebscher (ES) 35:12; R. Schopf (ES) 35:49; P. Geiger (SH) 44:30; S. Fischhaber (PP) 51:44; S. Rupprich (EN) 59:28 / Goals / 08:41 (ES) R. Valchař; 16:24 (ES) R. Szturc; 39:07 (ES) R. Valchař

20 April 2007; 18:30	Latvia	3–6 (0–1, 2–2, 1–3)	Finland	Äijänsuo Arena, Rauma; Attendance: 1,238

Game reference
R. Bukarts (ES) 28:29; J. Ozoliņš (ES) 31:16; S. Daņilovs (PP) 47:41 / Goals / 12:28 (PP) J. Liljeblad; 30:25 (ES) J. Jyrkkiö; 37:28 (ES) A. Kokkonen; 40:50 (ES) L. Kokkala; 48:45 (ES) T. Pallassalo; 52:39 (ES) E. Pöysti

=== Final round ===
==== Bracket ====
Quarterfinals
B2	Slovakia	2
A3	United States	7
A2	Russia (OT)	4
B3	Switzerland	3

Semifinals
A1	Canada	3
A3	United States (GWS)	4
B1	Sweden	4
A2	Russia	5

Final
A3	United States	5
A2	Russia	6
Third place
A1	Canada	3
B1	Sweden	8

==== Quarterfinals ====
19 April 2007; 15:00	Russia	4–3 OT (2–1, 0–0, 1–2); OT: (1–0)	Switzerland	Tampere Ice Stadium, Tampere; Attendance: 724

Game reference

Vadim Zhelobnyuk
Goalies
Robert Mayer
Referee:
(United States) Travis Smith
Linesmen:
(Czech Republic) František Kalivoda
(Germany) Felix Winnekens

Averin (Cherepanov) – 00:31	1–0
Voynov (Kulikov, Loktionov) – 04:48	2–0
	2–1	06:31 – Hollenstein (Berger, Müller)
	2–2	42:53 – Hollenstein (Berger, Schlagenhauf) (PP)
	2–3	49:45 – Berger (Schlagenhauf)
Klyukin – 55:48	3–3
Filatov (Voynov) – 66:37	4–3

8 min
Penalties
2 min
31
Shots
30

19 April 2007; 18:30	Slovakia	2–7 (1–2, 1–3, 0–2)	United States	Tampere Ice Stadium, Tampere; Attendance: 1,204

Game reference
A. Bezák (ES) 19:08; A. Bezák (ES) 34:06 / Goals / 05:25 (ES) P. White; 07:07 (ES) I. Cole; 29:25 (PP) J. Schroeder; 29:47 (ES) J. O'Brien; 36:47 (PP) C. Wilson; 43:03 (PP) C. Wilson; 49:46 (ES) I. Cole
24 min	Penalties	4 min
21	Shots	51

==== Semifinals ====
20 April 2007; 15:00	Sweden	4–5 (0–0, 2–3, 2–2)	Russia	Tampere Ice Stadium, Tampere; Attendance: 955

Game reference

Mark Owuya
Goalies
Vadim Zhelobnyuk
Alexander Pechursky
Referee:
(Canada) Kyle Rehman
Linesmen:
(Czech Republic) František Kalivoda
(Germany) Felix Winnekens

Hjalmarsson (Tedenby) – 21:10	1–0
Hjalmarsson – 21:33	2–0
	2–1	24:08 – Dadonov (Cherepanov)
	2–2	27:59 – Korostin (Averin)
	2–3	39:14 – Filatov (Voynov) (PP)
Bejmo (Motin, Torp) (PP) – 42:22	3–3
	3–4	42:44 – Cherepanov
Backlund (PS) – 55:02	4–4
	4–5	59:59 – Cherepanov (Dadonov, Averin) (PP)

14 min
Penalties
12 min
29
Shots
26

20 April 2007; 18:30	Canada	3–4 GWS (0–1, 3–1, 0–1); OT: (0–0); SO: (0–1)	United States	Tampere Ice Stadium, Tampere; Attendance: 1,505

Game reference
Z. Boychuk (PP) 20:52; Z. Boychuk (ES) 24:35; K. Turris (ES) 31:14 / Goals / 19:45 (ES) V. Saponari; 29:55 (PP) K. Shattenkirk; 41:36 (PP) J. van Riemsdyk; 70:00 (SO) J. van Riemsdyk
10 min	Penalties	6 min
31	Shots	45

==== Fifth place game ====
21 April 2007; 18:30	Switzerland	1–4 (0–0, 0–1, 1–3)	Slovakia	Tampere Ice Stadium, Tampere; Attendance: 416

Game reference
R. Suri (ES) 59:14 / Goals / 24:22 (ES) J. Molnár; 40:20 (ES) M. Kytnár; 54:20 (ES) M. Štěpán; 59:22 (EN) A. Bezák
6 min	Penalties	8 min
28	Shots	28

==== Bronze medal game ====
22 April 2007; 14:00	Canada	3–8 (0–2, 2–1, 1–5)	Sweden	Tampere Ice Stadium, Tampere; Attendance: 2,182

Game reference

Trevor Cann
Braden Holtby
Goalies
Mark Owuya
Referee:
(Slovakia) Vladimír Baluška
Linesmen:
(Czech Republic) František Kalivoda
(Slovakia) Alexander Pavlovič

	0–1	06:38 – Olsson (Hjalmarsson)
	0–2	16:11 – Hjalmarsson (Bejmo)
Esposito (Torquato) – 26:15	1–2
Doughty (Boychuk) – 36:52	2–2
	2–3	39:59 – Backlund (Gustafsson, Erixon)
	2–4	41:55 – Backlund (Hedman, Motin) (PP)
	2–5	46:35 – Hjalmarsson (Olsson, Johansson
	2–6	48:43 – Bejmo (Johansson, Hjalmarsson)
	2–7	51:22 – Bejmo (Hjalmarsson, Johansson)
	2–8	52:14 – Backlund (Möller)
Esposito (Sutter, Doyle) – 52:24	3–8

12 min
Penalties
8 min
28
Shots
55

==== Final ====
22 April 2007; 18:00	United States	5–6 (3–2, 1–2, 1–2)	Russia	Tampere Ice Stadium, Tampere; Attendance: 2,279

Game reference

Josh Unice
Goalies
Alexander Pechursky
Vadim Zhelobnyuk
Referee:
(Canada) Kyle Rehman
Linesmen:
(Sweden) Fredrik Carlman
(Finland) Antti Orelma

Severyn (Vargas) – 01:31	1–0
Saponari (Rust) (SH) – 06:13	2–0
	2–1	07:44 – Loktionov (Kugryshev, Voynov)
	2–2	11:33 – Korostin (Kagarlitsky)
Wilson (Van Riemsdyk, Schroeder) – 18:27	3–2
	3–3	23:59 – Kugryshev (Filatov)
	3–4	28:00 – Klyukin (Andronov, Korostin)
Van Riemsdyk (Wilson, Schroeder) – 30:37	4–4
	4–5	51:52 – Cherepanov (Karamnov, Petrov)
	4–6	57:45 – Averin (Kulikov)
Wilson (Fairchild, Van Riemsdyk) (EA) – 59:54	5–6

4 min
Penalties
6 min
36
Shots
24

=== Statistics ===
==== Scoring leaders ====
Pos	Player	Country	GP	G	A	Pts	+/−	PIM
1	James van Riemsdyk	United States	7	5	7	12	+2	4
1	Colin Wilson	United States	7	5	7	12	+3	4
3	Jordan Schroeder	United States	7	4	7	11	+3	0
4	Steven Stamkos	Canada	6	2	8	10	+2	8
5	Adam Bezák	Slovakia	6	4	5	9	+4	6
5	Nikita Filatov	Russia	7	4	5	9	+4	6
5	Simon Hjalmarsson	Sweden	6	4	5	9	+8	4
8	Alexei Cherepanov	Russia	7	5	3	8	0	6
8	Jamie Arniel	Canada	6	3	5	8	+3	10
10	Mikael Backlund	Sweden	6	6	1	7	0	6

GP = Games played; G = Goals; A = Assists; Pts = Points; +/− = P Plus–minus; PIM = Penalties In Minutes
Source: IIHF

==== Goaltending leaders ====
(minimum 40% team's total ice time)

Pos	Player	Country	TOI	GA	GAA	SA	Sv%	SO
1	Robert Mayer	Switzerland	304:15	11	2.17	145	92.41	1
2	Jaroslav Janus	Slovakia	267:37	14	3.14	177	92.09	0
3	Juha Metsola	Finland	198:38	7	2.11	86	91.86	0
4	Trevor Cann	Canada	366:10	18	2.95	219	91.78	0
5	Mark Owuya	Sweden	345:00	13	2.26	143	90.91	2

TOI = Time on ice (minutes:seconds); GA = Goals against; GAA = Goals against average; SA = Shots against; Sv% = Save percentage; SO = Shutouts
Source: IIHF

=== Awards ===
- Best players selected by the Directorate:
  - Best Goaltender: (United States) Josh Unice
  - Best Defenceman: (United States) Kevin Shattenkirk
  - Best Forward: (United States) James van Riemsdyk

Source: IIHF

- Media All-Stars:
  - Goaltender: (United States) Josh Unice
  - Defensemen: (Sweden) Victor Hedman / (United States) Kevin Shattenkirk
  - Forwards: (Russia) Alexei Cherepanov / (Canada) Steven Stamkos / (United States) James van Riemsdyk
  - MVP: (United States) James van Riemsdyk

Source: IIHF

=== Final standings ===
Rk.	Team
1st place, gold medalist(s)	Russia
2nd place, silver medalist(s)	United States
3rd place, bronze medalist(s)	Sweden
4	Canada
5	Slovakia
6	Switzerland
7	Finland
8	Germany
9	Czech Republic
10	Latvia

Czech Republic and Latvia are relegated to Division I for the 2008 IIHF World U18 Championships.

== Division I ==
Division I consisted of two separate tournaments. The Group A tournament was held between 6 April and 12 April 2007 in Maribor, Slovenia and the Group B tournament was held between 4 April and 10 April 2007 in Sanok, Poland. Belarus and Denmark won the Group A and Group B tournaments respectively and gained promotion to the Championship Division for the 2007 IIHF World U18 Championships. While France finished last in Group A and Great Britain last in Group B and were both relegated to Division II for 2007.

Final standings

Group A

1. Belarus — promoted to Championship Division for 2008
2. Slovenia
3. Kazakhstan
4. Italy
5. Austria
6. France — relegated to Division II for 2008

Group B

1. Denmark — promoted to Championship Division for 2008
2. Japan
3. Norway
4. Poland
5. Ukraine
6. Great Britain — relegated to Division II for 2008

== Division II ==
Division II consisted of two separate tournaments. The Group A tournament was held between 15 and 21 April 2007 in Miskolc, Hungary and the Group B tournament was held between 12 and 18 March 2006 in Miercurea Ciuc, Romania. Netherlands and Lithuania won the Group A and Group B tournaments respectively and gained promotion to Division I for the 2008 IIHF World U18 Championships. While Mexico finished last in Group A and Serbia last in Group B and were both relegated to Division III for 2008.

Final standings

Group A

1. Netherlands — promoted to Division I for 2008
2. Hungary
3. Estonia
4. Belgium
5. Israel
6. Mexico — relegated to Division III for 2008

Group B

1. Lithuania — promoted to Division I for 2008
2. South Korea
3. Croatia
4. Romania
5. Australia
6. Serbia — relegated to Division III for 2008

== Division III ==
The Division III tournament was held between 5 and 11 March 2007 in Beijing, China. Spain and China finished first and second respectively and both gained promotion to Division II for the 2008 IIHF World U18 Championships.

Final standings

1. Spain — promoted to Division II for 2008
2. China — promoted to Division II for 2008
3. Iceland
4. New Zealand
5. South Africa
6. Turkey

=== Division III Qualification ===
The Division III Qualification tournament was held on 28 January 2007 in İzmit, Turkey. Turkey won the tournament and qualified for the Division III tournament after winning the game against Bulgaria 3–2 in a shootout.

Final standings

1. Turkey — qualified for the 2007 Division III tournament
2. Bulgaria
