= Michal Krištof =

Slovak ice hockey player

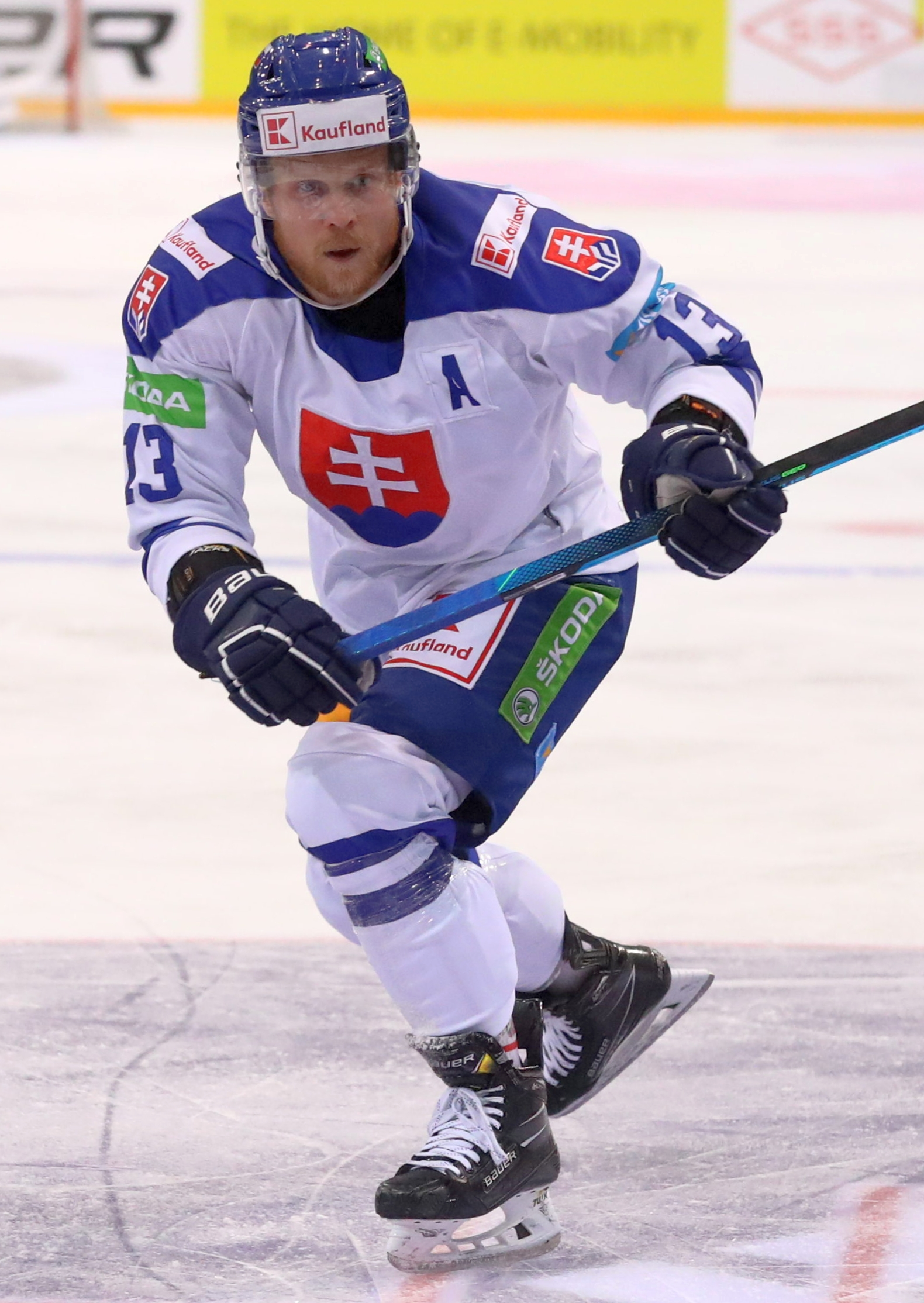
- Krištof in 2022
- Born: 11 October 1993 (age 33) Nitra, Slovakia
- Height: 5 ft 9 in (175 cm)
- Weight: 157 lb (71 kg; 11 st 3 lb)
- Position: Centre
- Shoots: Left
- NL team Former teams: SCL Tigers; HK Nitra; Vaasan Sport; HK Nitra; Kärpät; HC Kometa Brno; Admiral Vladivostok; HC Sochi
- National team: Slovakia
- Playing career: 2013–present

Michal Krištof (born October 11, 1993) is a Slovak professional ice hockey center playing for the SCL Tigers in Switzerland's National League (NL).

Krištof made his Liiga debut with Vaasan Sport during the 2014–15 season, playing two games for the team. He also played in the Slovak Extraliga for HK Nitra and the Czech Extraliga with HC Kometa Brno.

== Playing career ==
=== Early years ===
About four years old, Michal Krištof first stepped on the ice when his parents took him to an ice rink near his home in Nitra in Slovakia. He later started playing and practicing together with his three-year older cousin. Kristof played minor hockey in the local club HK Nitra.

Krištof's childhood idol was Steve Yzerman, "I do not really know why exactly him. I liked his playing style and took example of him".

=== Junior ===
As a 17-year-old, Krištof received a phone call from his agent about an opportunity to go to Vaasa, Finland where Sport's junior A team held a ten-day-long tryout camp during the summer. The young Slovak convinced the coaches and was added to the team's roster. During his first season in the junior's SM-liiga (2011–2012), Krištof scored 37 points over 42 games. During the 2012–2013 season, Krištof was among the top three points scorers for a long time but ended up in sixth place after being injured.

=== Professional ===
The 2013–14 season was Krištof's first on the senior level, playing for Sport in Mestis. Krištof had a good start to the season, but coach Pasi Räsänen eventually moved him to the junior A team after 37 games.

After Jokerit's decision to move to the KHL for the 2014–2015 season, Sport was added to the SM-liiga. Krištof signed a one-year-long contract with the now SM-liiga team. After starting the season on a loan to Peliitat in Mestis, where he scored three goals and made eight assists in six games, Krištof was called back to Sport. On October 3, 2014, Michal Krištof made his debut in the SM-liiga in a 3–2 away loss against Pelicans, where Krištof played right wing alongside centre Lassi Kokkala and left wing Teemu Henritius. Krištof recorded 11 minutes and 43 seconds of time on the ice, had one shot on goal, a zero plus-minus and zero penalty minutes in his first SM-liiga game.

Krištof spent the 2021–22 season in the Czech Extraliga with HC Kometa Brno, leaving as a free agent at the conclusion of his contract to sign a one-year contract in the KHL with Russian club, Admiral Vladivostok, on 21 July 2022.

On 1 May 2023, Krištof left Admiral as a free agent however continued his tenure in the KHL by agreeing to a two-year contract with HC Sochi.

Early in the 2024-25 season, Krištof became dissatisfied with his ice time and role on the Sochi team. On 18 October 2024, it was reported that Krištof had signed a contract to play in Switzerland's National League for the SCL Tigers. However, Sochi claimed that he had not been released from his KHL contract. As the KHL was no longer affiliated with the Russian Ice Hockey Federation, the IIHF refused to intervene on Sochi's behalf and the transfer to Switzerland was approved. Sochi threatened legal action.

== Career statistics ==
=== Regular season and playoffs ===
Bold indicates led league

			Regular season					Playoffs
Season	Team	League	GP	G	A	Pts	PIM	GP	G	A	Pts	PIM
2008–09	HK Ardo Nitra	SVK U18	13	4	7	11	2	—	—	—	—	—
2009–10	HC K´CERO Nitra	SVK U18	32	17	29	46	28	—	—	—	—	—
2010–11	HK Nitra	SVK U18	7	8	9	17	0	2	2	2	4	0
2010–11	HK Nitra	SVK U20	36	12	26	38	34	5	2	2	4	0
2011–12	Sport	Jr. A	42	18	19	37	37	—	—	—	—	—
2012–13	Sport	Jr. A	38	14	32	46	10	3	2	2	4	2
2013–14	Sport	Jr. A	8	0	5	5	2	—	—	—	—	—
2013–14	Sport	Mestis	50	2	29	31	20	1	0	0	0	0
2014–15	Sport	Liiga	2	0	0	0	2	—	—	—	—	—
2014–15	Peliitat	Mestis	41	9	17	26	34	—	—	—	—	—
2015–16	Hokki	Mestis	49	11	29	40	6	17	0	13	13	0
2016–17	HK Nitra	Slovak	56	15	27	42	22	13	2	3	5	4
2017–18	HK Nitra	Slovak	52	17	**40**	57	14	8	2	6	8	2
2018–19	Kärpät	Liiga	58	9	30	39	10	17	3	4	7	0
2019–20	Kärpät	Liiga	50	9	11	20	0	—	—	—	—	—
2020–21	Kärpät	Liiga	57	10	14	24	8	5	0	2	2	0
2021–22	HC Kometa Brno	ELH	42	8	22	30	10	5	3	0	3	0
2022–23	Admiral Vladivostok	KHL	46	7	23	30	12	12	1	3	4	2
2023–24	HC Sochi	KHL	54	9	23	32	12	—	—	—	—	—
2024–25	HC Sochi	KHL	10	2	3	5	8	—	—	—	—	—
2024–25	SCL Tigers	NL	28	3	5	8	0	1	0	0	0	0
2025–26	HK Nitra	SVK	46	14	27	41	4	19	3	9	12	4
Liiga totals			167	28	55	83	20	22	3	6	9	0
Slovak totals			156	46	94	140	40	40	7	18	25	10

Medal record

Representing Slovakia

Ice hockey

Olympic Games
Bronze medal – third place	2022 Beijing	

=== International ===
Year	Team	Event	Result	GP	G	A	Pts	PIM
2018	Slovakia	OG	11th	4	0	0	0	0
2018	Slovakia	WC	9th	7	3	3	6	2
2019	Slovakia	WC	9th	7	1	2	3	0
2021	Slovakia	WC	8th	8	1	1	2	0
2022	Slovakia	OG	3rd place, bronze medalist(s)	7	1	0	1	0
2022	Slovakia	WC	8th	8	1	5	6	0
2025	Slovakia	WC	11th	7	1	1	2	0
Senior totals				48	8	12	20	2

== Awards and honours ==
Honours	Year
Jr. A SM-Liiga All-Star Team	2012–13

== Criticism ==
Krištof is one of very few European players that signed contract with KHL team after start of Russian invasion and genocide in Ukraine in February 2022. As a player of Admiral Vladivostok he takes part in propaganda activities to support Russian army and its aggression in Ukraine, such as wearing army jersey in the match the day before first anniversary of Russian invasion in Ukraine.
