= Sergei Korostin =

Russian ice hockey player (born 1989)

- Born: July 5, 1989 (age 36) Prokopievsk, Russian SFSR, Soviet Union
- Height: 5 ft 11 in (180 cm)
- Weight: 192 lb (87 kg; 13 st 10 lb)
- Position: Right wing
- Shoots: Left
- VHL team Former teams: Zauralie Kurgan; Dynamo Moscow; Texas Stars; MHC Martin
- NHL draft: 64th overall, 2007; Dallas Stars
- Playing career: 2006–present

Sergei Anatolevich Korostin (Russian: Сергей Анатольевич Коростин; born July 5, 1989) is a Russian professional ice hockey forward currently playing for Zauralie Kurgan of the Supreme Hockey League (VHL).

== Playing career ==
Korostin was drafted in the third round, 64th overall, by the Dallas Stars in the 2007 NHL entry draft from HC Dynamo Moscow of the Russian Super League. Internationally, he delivered at the U18 WJC, scoring in key games against difficult opponents. Both him and Alexei Cherepanov combined for more than half of Russia's goals, potting 5 each. On March 12, 2008, Korostin was signed by the Dallas Stars to a three-year entry-level contract. Sergei split the previous season with Dynamo Moscow and the Texas Tornado of the Tier II North American Hockey League.

On June 26, 2008, Korostin was selected by the London Knights from the OHL but was later traded in season to the Peterborough Petes.

On December 2, 2010, Korostin signed with the Russian Major League team Dynamo Tver, he continued to play in the second tiered VHL for the following 10 seasons.

== Career statistics ==
=== Regular season and playoffs ===
			Regular season					Playoffs
Season	Team	League	GP	G	A	Pts	PIM	GP	G	A	Pts	PIM
2005–06	Dynamo-2 Moscow	RUS-3	41	25	8	33	38	—	—	—	—	—
2005–06	Dynamo Moscow	RSL	1	0	0	0	0	—	—	—	—	—
2006–07	Dynamo-2 Moscow	RUS-3	39	33	33	66	44	—	—	—	—	—
2006–07	Dynamo Moscow	RSL	7	0	0	0	8	—	—	—	—	—
2007–08	Dynamo Moscow	RSL	2	0	0	0	2	—	—	—	—	—
2007–08	Dynamo-2 Moscow	RUS-3	10	4	6	10	10	—	—	—	—	—
2007–08	Shakhter Prokopyevsk	RUS-3	2	2	2	4	—	—	—	—	—	—
2007–08	Texas Tornado	NAHL	19	8	10	18	12	3	2	0	2	2
2008–09	London Knights	OHL	13	2	5	7	17	—	—	—	—	—
2008–09	Peterborough Petes	OHL	36	11	18	29	16	4	1	2	3	0
2009–10	Texas Stars	AHL	63	13	12	25	41	2	0	0	0	0
2009–10	Idaho Steelheads	ECHL	4	4	2	6	2	—	—	—	—	—
2010–11	Dynamo Tver	VHL	28	9	7	16	8	—	—	—	—	—
2011–12	Sokol Krasnoyarsk	VHL	3	0	1	1	2	—	—	—	—	—
2011–12	HC Donbass	VHL	1	0	0	0	0	—	—	—	—	—
2011–12	HC Donbass-2	UKR	1	0	0	0	0	—	—	—	—	—
2011–12	HC VMF St. Petersburg	VHL	24	2	6	8	10	5	0	0	0	8
2012–13	HC VMF St. Petersburg	VHL	47	8	16	24	10	—	—	—	—	—
2013–14	VMF-Kareliya St. Petersburg	VHL	44	6	4	10	12	—	—	—	—	—
2014–15	SKA-Kareliya St. Petersburg	VHL	49	10	8	18	20	—	—	—	—	—
2015–16	SKA-Neva	VHL	36	6	4	10	10	3	0	0	0	0
2016–17	MHC Martin	Slovak	46	14	11	25	22	11	2	2	4	4
2017–18	Metallurg Novokuznetsk	VHL	51	9	9	18	14	10	1	3	4	16
2018–19	Metallurg Novokuznetsk	VHL	50	4	9	13	39	4	1	0	1	2
RSL totals			10	0	0	0	10	—	—	—	—	—
AHL totals			63	13	12	25	41	2	0	0	0	0

Medal record

Ice hockey

Representing Russia

World Junior Championships
Bronze medal – third place	2009 Canada	

IIHF World U18 Championship
Gold medal – first place	2007 Finland	

World Junior A Challenge
Bronze medal – third place	2006 Yorkton	

=== International ===
Year	Team	Event	Result	GP	G	A	Pts	PIM
2006	Russia	IH18	3rd place, bronze medalist(s)	4	2	2	4	6
2007	Russia	WJC18	1st place, gold medalist(s)	7	5	1	6	4
2009	Russia	WJC	3rd place, bronze medalist(s)	7	1	1	2	6
Junior totals				18	8	4	12	16
