= Nikita Klyukin =

Russian ice hockey player

- Born: 10 November 1989 Rybinsk, Soviet Union
- Died: 7 September 2011 (aged 21) Yaroslavl, Russia
- Height: 6 ft 0 in (183 cm)
- Weight: 194 lb (88 kg; 13 st 12 lb)
- Position: Centre
- Shot: Left
- Played for: Lokomotiv Yaroslavl (KHL)
- Playing career: 2008–2011

Medal record

Representing Russia

IIHF World U20 Championship
Bronze medal – third place	2009 Canada	

Representing Russia

Ice hockey

World Under-18 Championship
Gold medal – first place	2007 Finland	

World Junior A Challenge
Bronze medal – third place	2006 Yorkton	

Nikita Sergeyevich Klyukin (Russian: Никита Серге́евич Клюкин) (10 November 1989 – 7 September 2011) was a Russian professional ice hockey player who played in the KHL. He was killed in the 2011 Lokomotiv Yaroslavl plane crash.

== Death ==
On 7 September 2011, Klyukin was killed when a Yakovlev Yak-42 passenger aircraft, carrying nearly his entire Lokomotiv team, crashed just outside Yaroslavl, Russia. The team was traveling to Minsk to play their opening game of the season, with its coaching staff and prospects. Lokomotiv officials said "'everyone from the main roster was on the plane plus four players from the youth team.'"

== Career statistics ==
=== Regular season and playoffs ===
			Regular season					Playoffs
Season	Team	League	GP	G	A	Pts	PIM	GP	G	A	Pts	PIM
2008–09	Lokomotiv Yaroslavl	KHL	19	2	3	5	8	15	1	2	3	0
2009–10	Lokomotiv Yaroslavl	KHL	38	4	3	7	14	6	2	1	3	0
2010–11	Lokomotiv Yaroslavl	KHL	47	5	8	13	8	5	0	0	0	2
KHL totals			103	11	14	25	30	26	3	3	6	2

=== International ===
Year	Team	Event	GP	G	A	Pts	PIM
2009	Russia	WJC	7	0	8	8	2
Junior totals			7	0	8	8	2

== See also ==
- List of ice hockey players who died during their playing career
