= Patrick White (ice hockey) =

American ice hockey player

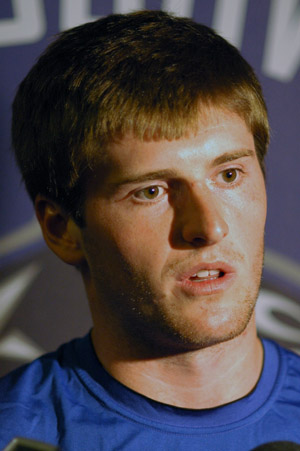
- Born: January 20, 1989 (age 37) Grand Rapids, Minnesota, U.S.
- Height: 6 ft 1 in (185 cm)
- Weight: 190 lb (86 kg; 13 st 8 lb)
- Position: Center
- Shot: Right
- Played for: HC ’05 Banská Bystrica; HC Slovan Bratislava; Graz 99ers Lillehammer IK; Ducs de Dijon
- NHL draft: 25th overall, 2007; Vancouver Canucks
- Playing career: 2011–2017

Patrick White (born January 20, 1989) is an American former professional ice hockey player. A center, he last played with Ducs de Dijon in the Ligue Magnus.

White previously played in North America for the University of Minnesota Golden Gophers of the Western Collegiate Hockey Association (WCHA). Prior to joining the Golden Gophers, he played four seasons of high school hockey in the Minnesota State High School League with the Grand Rapids High School Thunderhawks. Although he was drafted twice by junior ice hockey teams—the Seattle Thunderbirds of the Western Hockey League (WHL) in 2004 and the Tri-City Storm of the United States Hockey League (USHL) in 2005—he chose to play for his high school instead. Described as a skilled forward with a good wrist shot, White was drafted in the first round, 25th overall by the Vancouver Canucks in the 2007 NHL entry draft, before being traded to the Sharks in 2009. Despite promise as a first-round NHL draft pick, White never played in North America after college, instead playing in various leagues across Europe.

== Playing career ==
=== Grand Rapids High School ===
White joined the hockey team at Grand Rapids High School when he began his education at the school. In his first season, he finished with seven points in 26 games. At the end of the season, White was drafted in the tenth round, 195th overall by the Seattle Thunderbirds of the Western Hockey League (WHL) in the 2004 WHL Bantam Draft although he declined to join the team, opting rather to continue with Grand Rapids. The next season, White greatly improved his statistics, finishing the season with 33 points in 26 games. In the offseason, he was drafted in the second round, 13th overall by the Tri-City Storm of the United States Hockey League (USHL) in the 2005 Futures Draft, although opted once again to continue with Grand Rapids.

In his third season with Grand Rapids, White led the team with 52 points in 30 games, earning Associated Press (AP) All-State honorable mention, Duluth News Tribune Second Team All-Area, and Iron Range All-Conference honors. He also helped Grand Rapids finish runner-up at the Minnesota State High School Boys Hockey Tournament, earning All-Tournament Team honors after finishing with five goals in three games.

Prior to his senior season with Grand Rapids, White signed a letter of intent to play for the University of Minnesota and their Minnesota Golden Gophers men's ice hockey program following his season. In his final season at Grand Rapids, White finished scored 49 points in 30 games to be named AP Player of the Year, Duluth News Tribune Player of the Year, AP All-State First Team, St. Paul Pioneer Press All-State First Team, Duluth News Tribune First-Team All-Area, and Iron Range All-Conference. He was also a finalist for the Minnesota Mr. Hockey award, eventually losing the award to Cretin-Derham Hall High School defenseman Ryan McDonagh. Once again, he led Grand Rapids to a second-place finish at the Minnesota State High School Boys Hockey Tournament, earning All-Tournament Team honors for the second consecutive year. White also played in twelve games for the Tri-City Storm of the USHL, split before and after his high school season, scoring eight goals and one assist. Following the season, White entered the 2007 NHL entry draft ranked 23rd overall among North American skaters. The NHL's Central Scouting Service described White as "a skilled forward with the ability to make a difference" and able to get "his wrist shot off with ease." He was also said adept at going into corners of the ice and fighting for the puck. On June 22, 2007, he was drafted 25th overall by the Vancouver Canucks.

=== University of Minnesota ===
White joined the University of Minnesota for the 2007–08 season. Early into his freshman season, he scored the game-winning goal against the University of Michigan in the championship game of the 2007 Ice Breaker Invitational. The goal was the first of White's college career. White finished his freshman year with ten points in 45 games while leader the Golden Gophers with a plus/minus rating of plus-nine. Furthermore, the Golden Gophers failed to lose any game in which White scored a point, earning seven wins and two ties.

White's sophomore season with the Golden Gophers began as a disappointment. He did not record his first goal until the last weekend of November in the Golden Gophers' fourteenth game of the season. However, White quickly turned his play around, scoring four goals in the Golden Gophers' next ten games, including the game-winning goal 1:38 into overtime at the 2009 Dodge Holiday Classic to lead the Golden Gophers to a 3–2 victory over Northeastern University. White scored two goals in the two-game tournament, earning All-Tournament Team honors. He finished the 2009–10 season with nine goals and eight assists in thirty-nine games for the Golden Gophers.

On August 28, 2009, White was traded from the Canucks to the San Jose Sharks, along with fellow prospect Daniel Rahimi, in exchange for defensemen Christian Ehrhoff and Brad Lukowich. White had a career season in his third year with the Golden Gophers. He set career highs in goals, with nine, and points, with seventeen. He also tied for third on the team in goals, and tied for seventh in points.

=== Europe ===
In the following season of 2011–12 he signed with EHC Klostersee, the runner-up of season 2010–11, in the Oberliga, the third tier of ice hockey in Germany. After a year playing for Klostersee, in summer 2012 he signed a contract with the Hannover Indians where he is supposed to be a basic player in the second scoring line. The team is a part of second tier German hockey in the Bundesliga.

In the 2014–15 season, White began the year with HC Slovan Bratislava in the Kontinental Hockey League before he was returned on loan for a second stint with HC ’05 Banská Bystrica in the Slovak Extraliga.

On August 5, 2015, White signed a one-year contract as a free agent with Austrian club, Graz 99ers of the EBEL.

== International play ==
Medal record

Representing United States

Men's ice hockey

World U18 Championships
Silver medal – second place	2007 Finland	

White was first exposed to international ice hockey when he represented the United States at the 2005 Under-17 Five Nations Tournament in Huttwil, Switzerland, competing against teams from the Czech Republic, Germany, Slovakia, and Switzerland. White helped the United States to first place with a record of 3–0–1, finishing the tournament with two points including an assist on the game-winning goal in the final game.

Two years later, White was named to the United States team for the 2007 IIHF World U18 Championships in Finland, his first International Ice Hockey Federation-sanctioned event. White scored three goals and two assists in seven games—including a two-goal performance against Latvia in which he scored the game-winning goal—as the United States lost 6–5 to Russia in the gold medal game.

== Personal life ==
White was born in Grand Rapids, Minnesota. Mark, his father, played Division III college hockey at Hamline University and had experience coaching; he coached White in minor hockey, and also did work with a community college in Grand Rapids. In honor of his father, White wore the number six, the same number Mark used. While at the University of Minnesota, White pursued a management major at the Carlson School of Management.

== Career statistics ==
=== Regular season and playoffs ===
			Regular season					Playoffs
Season	Team	League	GP	G	A	Pts	PIM	GP	G	A	Pts	PIM
2003–04	Grand Rapids HS Thunderhawks	MSHSL	26	2	5	7	—	—	—	—	—	—
2004–05	Grand Rapids HS Thunderhawks	MSHSL	26	18	15	33	—	—	—	—	—	—
2005–06	Grand Rapids HS Thunderhawks	MSHSL	30	23	29	52	—	—	—	—	—	—
2006–07	Grand Rapids HS Thunderhawks	MSHSL	30	18	31	49	—	—	—	—	—	—
2006–07	Tri-City Storm	USHL	12	8	1	9	4	—	—	—	—	—
2007–08	University of Minnesota	WCHA	45	6	4	10	20	—	—	—	—	—
2008–09	University of Minnesota	WCHA	36	7	9	16	18	—	—	—	—	—
2009–10	University of Minnesota	WCHA	39	9	8	17	20	—	—	—	—	—
2010–11	University of Minnesota	WCHA	27	5	5	10	12	—	—	—	—	—
2011–12	EHC Klostersee	GerObL	40	32	38	70	34	3	2	3	5	0
2012–13	Hannover Indians	2.GBun	48	19	18	37	28	—	—	—	—	—
2013–14	HC ’05 Banská Bystrica	Slovak	55	21	22	43	20	11	5	2	7	4
2014–15	HC Slovan Bratislava	KHL	26	0	0	0	6	—	—	—	—	—
2014–15	HC ’05 Banská Bystrica	Slovak	32	14	10	24	6	18	3	4	7	10
2015–16	Graz 99ers	EBEL	8	1	1	2	2	—	—	—	—	—
2015–16	Leksands IF	Allsv	7	1	1	2	2	—	—	—	—	—
2015–16	Lillehammer IK	GET	17	2	9	11	8	—	—	—	—	—
2016–17	Ducs de Dijon	FRA	40	11	5	16	20	—	—	—	—	—
KHL totals			26	0	0	0	6	—	—	—	—	—

=== International statistics ===
Year	Team	Event	Result	GP	G	A	Pts	PIM
2005	United States	U17	1st place, gold medalist(s)	4	1	1	2	0
2007	United States	WJC18	2nd place, silver medalist(s)	7	3	2	5	6
Junior totals				7	3	2	5	6

== Awards and honors ==
- 2006 – AP All-State honorable mention
- 2006 – Duluth News Tribune Second Team All-Area
- 2006 – Iron Range All-Conference
- 2006 – MSHSL All-Tournament Team
- 2007 – AP All-State First Team
- 2007 – AP Player of the Year
- 2007 – Duluth News Tribune First-Team All-Area
- 2007 – Duluth News Tribune Player of the Year
- 2007 – Iron Range All-Conference
- 2007 – St. Paul Pioneer Press All-State First Team
- 2007 – MSHSL All-Tournament Team

== Transactions ==
- June 22, 2007 – Drafted in the first round, 25th overall by the Vancouver Canucks in the 2007 NHL entry draft
- August 28, 2009 - Traded with Daniel Rahimi to the San Jose Sharks for Christian Ehrhoff and Brad Lukowich

Awards and achievements
Preceded by Michael Grabner	Vancouver Canucks first-round draft pick 2007	Succeeded by Cody Hodgson
