= Pascal Berger =

Swiss ice hockey player

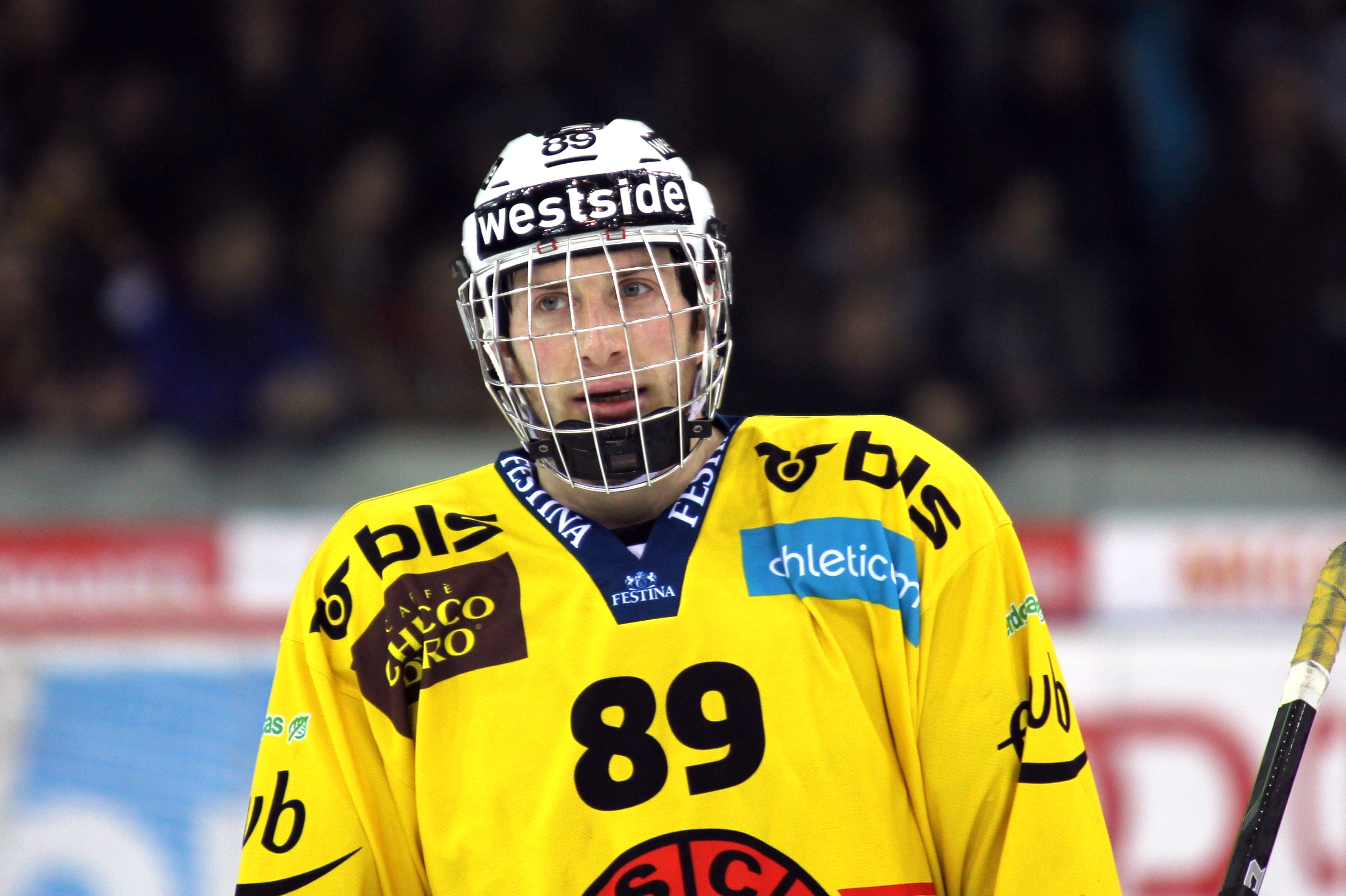
- Born: March 24, 1989 (age 35); Burgdorf, Switzerland
- Height: 5 ft 10 in (178 cm)
- Weight: 181 lb (82 kg; 12 st 13 lb)
- Position: Wing
- Shoots: Right
- NL team Former teams: SCL Tigers; SC Bern
- Playing career: 2006–present

Pascal Berger (born March 24, 1989) is a Swiss professional ice hockey player who is currently playing as captain for the SCL Tigers in the National League (NL). Pascal's brother Alain Berger plays for SC Bern, he returned to Switzerland after an unsuccessful stint in North America within the Montreal Canadiens organization.

== Career statistics ==
=== Regular season and playoffs ===
			Regular season					Playoffs
Season	Team	League	GP	G	A	Pts	PIM	GP	G	A	Pts	PIM
2006–07	SC Bern	NLA	14	2	1	3	0	3	0	0	0	0
2006–07	SC Langenthal	NLB	3	0	0	0	0	—	—	—	—	—
2007–08	SC Bern	NLA	25	1	2	3	2	4	0	1	1	0
2007–08	Young Sprinters	NLB	19	7	3	10	30	—	—	—	—	—
2008–09	SC Bern	NLA	45	4	3	7	12	4	0	0	0	0
2008–09	Young Sprinters	NLB	4	2	4	6	2	—	—	—	—	—
2009–10	SC Bern	NLA	49	7	7	14	16	15	4	4	8	6
2010–11	SC Bern	NLA	29	6	9	15	6	11	1	1	2	6
2011–12	SC Bern	NLA	50	18	14	32	6	17	4	6	10	6
2012–13	SC Bern	NLA	50	7	8	15	22	20	3	1	4	4
2013–14	SC Bern	NLA	46	8	6	14	10	—	—	—	—	—
2014–15	SC Bern	NLA	50	5	6	11	10	11	1	0	1	0
2015–16	SC Bern	NLA	45	8	13	21	18	14	2	3	5	2
2016–17	SCL Tigers	NLA	41	9	7	16	16	—	—	—	—	—
2017–18	SCL Tigers	NL	31	9	3	12	10	—	—	—	—	—
2018–19	SCL Tigers	NL	50	12	4	16	12	7	0	3	3	4
2019–20	SCL Tigers	NL	50	8	5	13	26	—	—	—	—	—
2020–21	SCL Tigers	NL	49	13	11	24	44	—	—	—	—	—
2021–22	SCL Tigers	NL	50	4	5	9	12	—	—	—	—	—
2022–23	SCL Tigers	NL	52	1	2	3	6	—	—	—	—	—
NL totals			726	122	106	228	228	106	15	19	34	28

=== International ===
Year	Team	Event	Result	GP	G	A	Pts	PIM
2007	Switzerland	U18	6th	6	2	2	4	6
2008	Switzerland	WJC	9th	6	0	0	0	0
2009	Switzerland	WJC-D1	11th	5	5	3	8	10
Junior totals				17	7	5	12	16
