= Jerome Flaake =

German ice hockey player (born 1990)

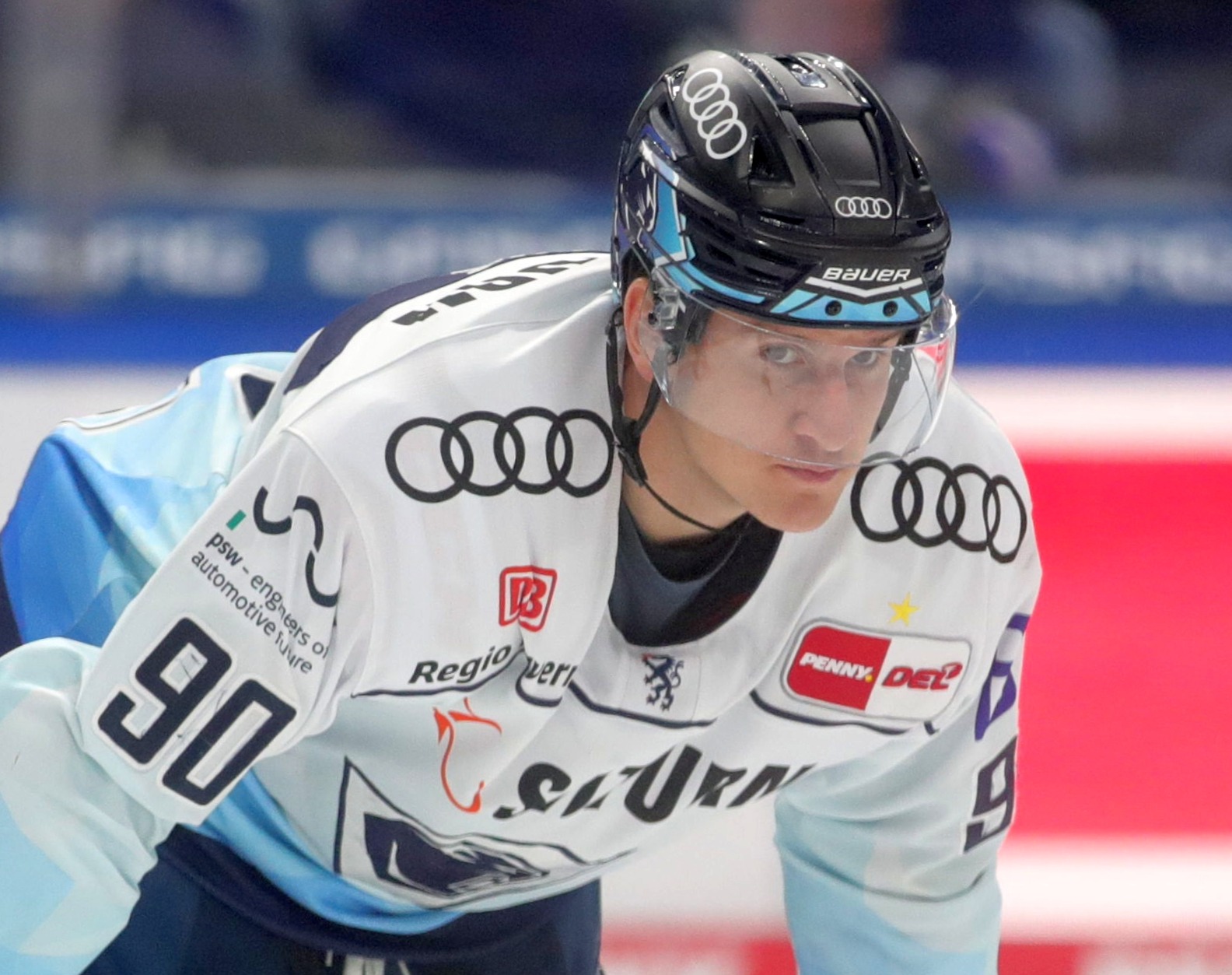
- Flaake playing against Eisbären Berlin in 2023
- Born: 2 March 1990 (age 36) Guben, East Germany
- Height: 1.89 m (6 ft 2 in)
- Weight: 86 kg (190 lb; 13 st 8 lb)
- Position: Right wing
- Shoots: Left
- DEL team Former teams: Free Agent; Kölner Haie; Hamburg Freezers; EHC München; Düsseldorfer EG; ERC Ingolstadt; Augsburger Panther
- National team: Germany
- NHL draft: 130th overall, 2008; Toronto Maple Leafs
- Playing career: 2007–present

Jerome Flaake (born 2 March 1990) is a German professional ice hockey left winger who is currently an unrestricted free agent. He most recently played under contract with Krefeld Pinguine of the DEL2.

== Playing career ==
Flaake started playing ice hockey at the age of seven at ESV Königsbrunn. Later in his junior career, he played for Augsburger EV, SC Riessersee, Jungadler Mannheim and Kölner Haie.

He was drafted 130th overall by the Toronto Maple Leafs in the 2008 NHL entry draft. The Leafs used the Florida Panthers' 5th round choice, which they received in sole compensation for defenseman Wade Belak in a trade on 26 February 2008.

He made his debut in Germany's top-flight Deutsche Eishockey Liga (DEL) for the Kölner Haie in the course of the 2007-08 season. He formerly wore number 90 for Kölner Haie (Cologne Sharks). Two of his four goals for Köln in the 2008–09 season have been game-winning goals.

Flaake initially signed a two-year deal with the Hamburg Freezers on 30 March 2010 and then was handed a contract extension through the 2013-14 campaign. After leading the team in scoring during the 2012-13 season, he signed a new five-year deal with the Freezers in May 2013. The team folded in May 2016, which made Flaake a free agent. Shortly after, on 2 June 2016, he signed with fellow DEL side EHC München.

After two championship seasons with EHC München, Flaake left the club for more responsibility, agreeing to a three-year contract with Düsseldorfer EG on 15 May 2018.

After his contract with Düsseldorfer EG, Flaake left as a free agent to sign a one-year contract with ERC Ingolstadt on 19 May 2021.

== International play ==
Flaake made his first World Championship appearance in 2016.

== Style of play ==
According to Cologne's former general manager Rodion Pauels, Flaake's strengths lie in his skating abilities, intelligence on the ice, as well as his nose for the net.

== Career statistics ==
=== Regular season and playoffs ===
			Regular season					Playoffs
Season	Team	League	GP	G	A	Pts	PIM	GP	G	A	Pts	PIM
2007–08	Kölner Haie	DEL	30	0	1	1	4	—	—	—	—	—
2008–09	Kölner Haie	DEL	43	5	11	16	22	—	—	—	—	—
2009–10	Kölner Haie	DEL	42	3	6	9	45	—	—	—	—	—
2009–10	Fischtown Pinguins	2.GBun	2	0	3	3	0	—	—	—	—	—
2010–11	Hamburg Freezers	DEL	47	4	11	15	18	—	—	—	—	—
2011–12	Hamburg Freezers	DEL	50	16	19	35	12	5	0	0	0	4
2012–13	Hamburg Freezers	DEL	52	20	25	45	50	4	1	2	3	0
2013–14	Hamburg Freezers	DEL	50	25	19	44	32	12	2	5	7	6
2014–15	Hamburg Freezers	DEL	43	15	21	36	52	—	—	—	—	—
2015–16	Hamburg Freezers	DEL	51	14	21	35	57	—	—	—	—	—
2016–17	EHC München	DEL	50	9	9	18	22	14	2	2	4	6
2017–18	EHC München	DEL	41	2	6	8	16	17	0	5	5	6
2018–19	Düsseldorfer EG	DEL	22	3	5	8	4	6	1	0	1	4
2019–20	Düsseldorfer EG	DEL	52	18	13	31	18	—	—	—	—	—
2020–21	Düsseldorfer EG	DEL	34	12	6	18	12	—	—	—	—	—
2021–22	ERC Ingolstadt	DEL	41	6	4	10	6	2	1	0	1	0
2022–23	ERC Ingolstadt	DEL	50	9	11	20	18	3	0	0	0	0
2023–24	Augsburger Panther	DEL	12	1	2	3	8	—	—	—	—	—
2023–24	Krefeld Pinguine	DEL2	24	7	6	13	10	7	0	5	5	6
DEL totals			710	162	190	352	396	63	7	14	21	26

=== International ===
Year	Team	Event	GP	G	A	Pts	PIM
2007	Germany	WJC18	6	4	2	6	12
2008	Germany	WJC18	6	1	2	3	6
2008	Germany	WJC-D1	5	3	3	6	4
2009	Germany	WJC	5	3	2	5	6
2010	Germany	WJC-D1	5	4	1	5	4
2013	Germany	OGQ	3	1	2	3	0
2016	Germany	WC	5	0	0	0	2
Junior totals			27	15	10	25	32
Senior totals			8	1	2	3	2
