= Justin Vaive =

American ice hockey player (born 1989)

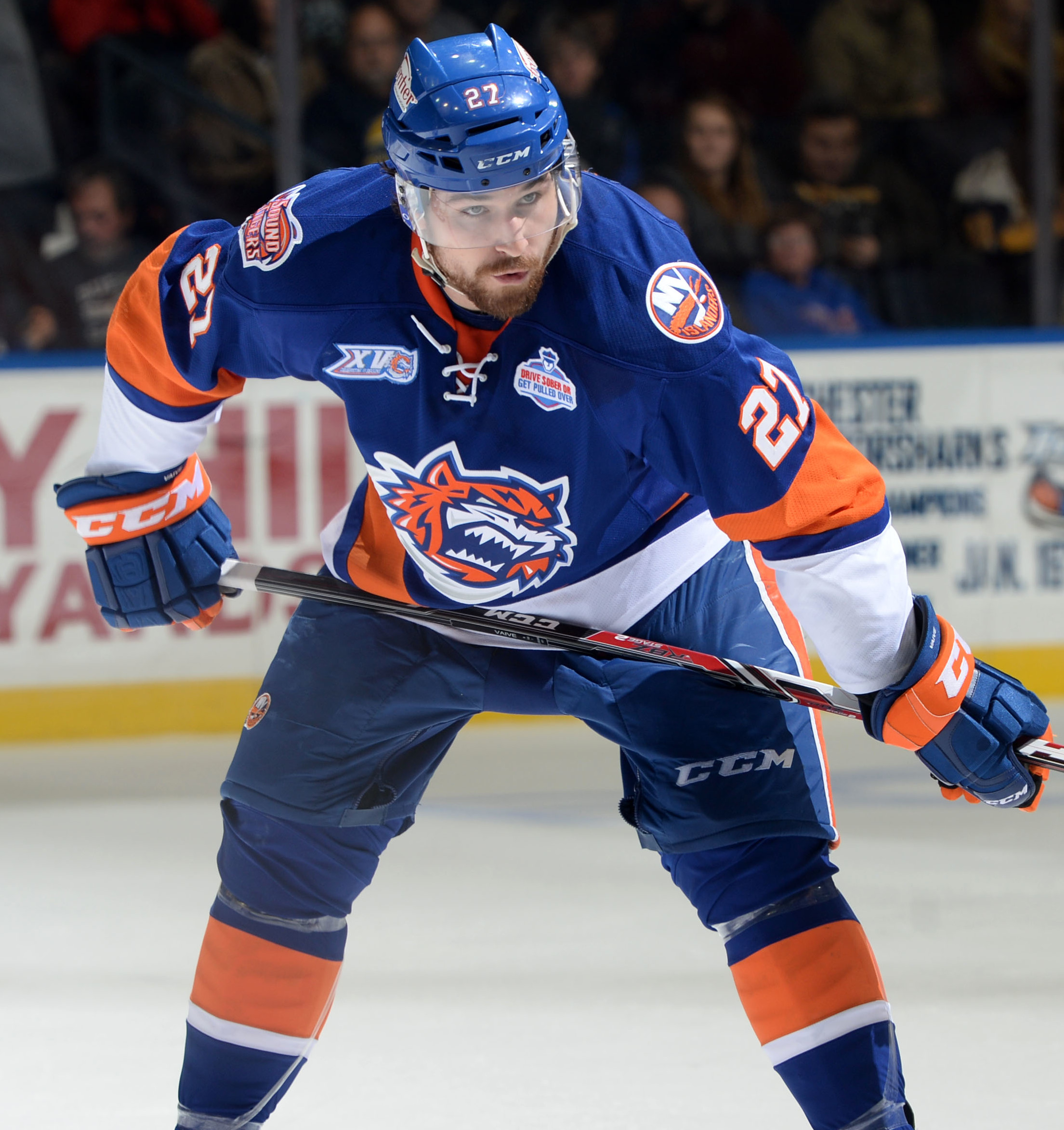
- Vaive with the Bridgeport Sound Tigers in 2015
- Born: July 8, 1989 (age 37) Buffalo, New York, U.S.
- Height: 6 ft 6 in (198 cm)
- Weight: 240 lb (109 kg; 17 st 2 lb)
- Position: Left wing
- Shot: Left
- ECHL team Former teams: Cincinnati Cyclones; San Antonio Rampage; Hartford Wolf Pack; Bridgeport Sound Tigers; Rochester Americans; Belleville Senators
- NHL draft: 92nd overall, 2007; Anaheim Ducks
- Playing career: 2011–2026

Justin Vaive (born July 8, 1989) is an American professional ice hockey player. He is currently playing with the Cincinnati Cyclones in the ECHL. His father is former National Hockey League All-Star right-winger Rick Vaive. Vaive was selected by the Anaheim Ducks in the 4th round (92nd overall) of the 2007 NHL entry draft.

== Playing career ==
Vaive attended Ohio's Miami University, where he played four seasons (2007–2011) of NCAA college hockey with the Miami RedHawks men's ice hockey team.

On August 24, 2011, the San Antonio Rampage of the American Hockey League signed Vaive to a contract.

On July 24, 2014, Vaive re-signed to a one-year ECHL contract with the Greenville Road Warriors. Before the 2014–15 season on September 3, he was signed to return with Road Warriors AHL affiliate, the Hartford Wolf Pack, on a one-year deal.

On July 2, 2015, Vaive agreed to his first NHL contract as a free agent, signing a one-year, two-way contract with the New York Islanders. Vaive was unable to claim a roster spot with the Islanders and was reassigned to AHL affiliate, the Bridgeport Sound Tigers for the duration of the 2015–16 season.

With his rights not retained by the Islanders, Vaive went unsigned over the summer as a free agent before agreeing to return to the Cincinnati Cyclones of the ECHL on October 14, 2016. After appearing in the season opener, he accepted a professional try-out offer to return to the AHL with the Rochester Americans the following day.

Having captained the Cyclones for the previous two seasons, Vaive agreed to a contract extension in approaching his seventh year within the ECHL with the Cyclones for the 2020–21 season. However, the Cyclones opted to commence a hiatus due to the ongoing COVID-19 pandemic and he was immediately released as a free agent. On January 6, 2021, Vaive signed a contract to continue in the ECHL with the Fort Wayne Komets. Adding experience to the Komets forward group, Vaive added 18 points through 48 regular season games and 6 points in 13 playoff contests to help the Komets claim their first Kelly Cup in franchise history.

With the Cyclones returning to play for the 2021–22 season, Vaive returned to the club, agreeing to a one-year contract on July 14, 2021. In 2024, he continues to play, and remains as team captain.

On September 15th, 2026, Vaive announced his retirement.

== Career statistics ==
=== Regular season and playoffs ===
			Regular season					Playoffs
Season	Team	League	GP	G	A	Pts	PIM	GP	G	A	Pts	PIM
2004–05	Milton Icehawks	OPJHL	1	1	0	1	0	—	—	—	—	—
2005–06	U.S. National Development Team	NAHL	24	4	8	12	34	—	—	—	—	—
2006–07	U.S. National Development Team	NAHL	15	4	1	5	22	—	—	—	—	—
2007–08	Miami University (Ohio)	CCHA	41	3	7	10	65	—	—	—	—	—
2008–09	Miami University (Ohio)	CCHA	37	6	6	12	44	—	—	—	—	—
2009–10	Miami University (Ohio)	CCHA	43	5	3	8	51	—	—	—	—	—
2010–11	Miami University (Ohio)	CCHA	39	9	7	16	48	—	—	—	—	—
2011–12	Cincinnati Cyclones	ECHL	40	6	12	18	65	—	—	—	—	—
2011–12	San Antonio Rampage	AHL	15	0	0	0	10	—	—	—	—	—
2012–13	San Antonio Rampage	AHL	41	2	2	4	38	—	—	—	—	—
2012–13	Cincinnati Cyclones	ECHL	6	2	2	4	10	15	1	2	3	21
2013–14	Greenville Road Warriors	ECHL	13	10	8	18	20	13	6	5	11	14
2013–14	Hartford Wolf Pack	AHL	27	1	4	5	31	—	—	—	—	—
2014–15	Hartford Wolf Pack	AHL	62	14	18	32	94	8	0	1	1	10
2015–16	Bridgeport Sound Tigers	AHL	63	11	6	17	79	—	—	—	—	—
2016–17	Cincinnati Cyclones	ECHL	1	0	0	0	0	—	—	—	—	—
2016–17	Rochester Americans	AHL	66	3	6	9	90	—	—	—	—	—
2017–18	Cincinnati Cyclones	ECHL	48	32	13	45	107	5	5	1	6	12
2017–18	Belleville Senators	AHL	6	0	0	0	2	—	—	—	—	—
2018–19	Cincinnati Cyclones	ECHL	65	19	15	34	120	11	3	6	9	6
2019–20	Cincinnati Cyclones	ECHL	58	21	14	35	86	—	—	—	—	—
2020–21	Fort Wayne Komets	ECHL	47	10	8	18	93	13	4	2	6	4
2021–22	Cincinnati Cyclones	ECHL	70	22	26	48	116	7	2	3	5	6
2022–23	Cincinnati Cyclones	ECHL	72	32	20	52	89	11	2	1	3	22
2023–24	Cincinnati Cyclones	ECHL	45	13	15	28	48	—	—	—	—	—
AHL totals			280	31	36	67	344	8	0	1	1	10

=== International ===
Year	Team	Event	Result	GP	G	A	Pts	PIM
2006	United States	U17	2nd place, silver medalist(s)	6	0	4	4	6
2007	United States	U18	2nd place, silver medalist(s)	7	3	3	6	2
Junior totals				13	3	7	10	8

== Awards and honors ==
Award	Year
ECHL
Kelly Cup (Fort Wayne Komets)	2021
