= Luca Cunti =

Swiss ice hockey player (born 1989)

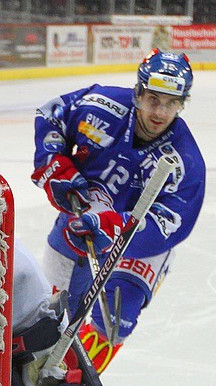
- Born: July 4, 1989 (age 37) Zurich, Switzerland
- Height: 6 ft 2 in (188 cm)
- Weight: 209 lb (95 kg; 14 st 13 lb)
- Position: Left wing
- Shoots: Left
- NL team Former teams: EHC Biel; SCL Tigers; ZSC Lions; EHC Kloten; HC Lugano
- National team: Switzerland
- NHL draft: 75th overall, 2007; Tampa Bay Lightning
- Playing career: 2005–present

Luca Cunti (born July 4, 1989) is a Swiss professional ice hockey forward who is currently playing for EHC Biel in the National League (NL). He previously played for the SCL Tigers, the ZSC Lions, EHC Kloten and HC Lugano. He was selected by the Tampa Bay Lightning in the 3rd round (75th overall) of the 2007 NHL entry draft.

== Playing career ==
Cunti played two North American junior seasons in the United States Hockey League and the Quebec Major Junior Hockey League before returning to his native Switzerland, unsigned from the Lightning, to continue his career with the SCL Tigers. He later moved to rivals the ZSC Lions and signed a two-year contract extension on October 19, 2011.

On April 22, 2014, Cunti was signed to a three-year contract extension by the Lions. In his final year of his contract with Zurich, Cunti agreed to a two-year contract with HC Lugano for the start of the 2017–18 season, with a reported worth of CHF2.4 million.

On January 11, 2017, Cunti was shipped to ZSC's longtime rival, EHC Kloten for the remainder of the 2016–17 season. Cunti didn't join Lugano before the end of the 2016–17 season as the Lions insisted on a clause which would have prevented Cunti from playing any game against Zurich. This clause was not accepted by Lugano and therefore, Cunti joined Kloten.

Cunti made his debut with Kloten against Lausanne HC on January 13, 2017, scoring one goal and tallying one assist. Cunti's short stint with Kloten ended on March 14, 2017, once Kloten saved itself from relegation and despite 2 games remaining in the playout round. He went on to play 16 games for Kloten, tallying 4 goals and 9 assists, before joining Lugano in the summer of 2017.

After only 11 games into the 2018–19 season, Cunti badly hurt his left shoulder, which would eventually end his season. On December 24, 2018, Cunti agreed to a two-year contract worth CHF 1.2 million with EHC Biel, starting for the 2019–20 season and through the 2020–21 season. Cunti played 54 regular-season games with Lugano (25 points) over two seasons as well as 16 playoff games in 2018 (10 points), helping the team reach the final.

On February 4, 2021, Cunti agreed to a four-year contract extension with EHC Biel.

== Career statistics ==
=== Regular season and playoffs ===
			Regular season					Playoffs
Season	Team	League	GP	G	A	Pts	PIM	GP	G	A	Pts	PIM
2004–05	GCK Lions	SUI U20	32	12	10	22	18	—	—	—	—	—
2004–05	EHC Dübendorf	SUI.3	2	0	0	0	0	—	—	—	—	—
2005–06	GCK Lions	SUI U20	46	20	24	44	34	—	—	—	—	—
2005–06	GCK Lions	SUI.2	7	0	0	0	2	—	—	—	—	—
2005–06	EHC Dübendorf	SUI.3	6	1	5	6	0	6	2	2	4	0
2006–07	GCK Lions	SUI U20	13	9	7	16	22	—	—	—	—	—
2006–07	GCK Lions	SUI.2	5	1	1	2	0	—	—	—	—	—
2006–07	HC Thurgau	SUI.2	5	1	0	1	6	—	—	—	—	—
2006–07	SC Weinfelden	SUI.3	1	2	0	2	0	—	—	—	—	—
2006–07	EHC Dübendorf	SUI.3	11	8	8	16	18	10	4	7	11	10
2006–07	Switzerland U20	SUI.2	3	0	0	0	2	—	—	—	—	—
2007–08	Chicago Steel	USHL	34	11	21	32	37	6	2	3	5	2
2008–09	Rimouski Océanic	QMJHL	57	20	25	45	32	13	4	5	9	12
2009–10	SCL Tigers	NLA	12	1	1	2	4	—	—	—	—	—
2010–11	GCK Lions	SUI.2	42	9	23	32	80	—	—	—	—	—
2011–12	ZSC Lions	NLA	35	11	13	24	18	15	1	7	8	6
2012–13	ZSC Lions	NLA	44	10	20	30	18	12	2	3	5	6
2013–14	ZSC Lions	NLA	46	18	26	44	60	18	5	5	10	10
2014–15	ZSC Lions	NLA	34	9	14	23	14	17	3	4	7	2
2015–16	ZSC Lions	NLA	32	9	9	18	14	2	0	0	0	0
2016–17	ZSC Lions	NLA	24	4	4	8	6	—	—	—	—	—
2016–17	EHC Kloten	NLA	12	2	9	11	8	—	—	—	—	—
2017–18	HC Lugano	NL	48	8	13	21	18	16	3	7	10	18
2018–19	HC Lugano	NL	11	1	3	4	4	—	—	—	—	—
2019–20	EHC Biel	NL	44	8	22	30	40	—	—	—	—	—
2020–21	EHC Biel	NL	44	13	21	34	34	2	0	0	0	4
2021–22	EHC Biel	NL	42	7	18	25	28	4	1	1	2	4
NL totals			423	101	173	274	266	86	15	27	42	50

Medal record

Ice hockey

Representing Switzerland

World Championships
Silver medal – second place	2013 Sweden/Finland	

=== International ===
Year	Team	Event	Result	GP	G	A	Pts	PIM
2005	Switzerland	WJC18	9th	6	1	1	2	0
2007	Switzerland	WJC18	6th	6	3	1	4	6
2013	Switzerland	WC	2nd place, silver medalist(s)	10	2	3	5	2
2014	Switzerland	OG	9th	4	0	0	0	0
2014	Switzerland	WC	10th	7	1	3	4	2
Junior totals				12	4	2	6	6
Senior totals				21	3	6	9	4
