= Jim O'Brien (ice hockey) =

American ice hockey player (born 1989)

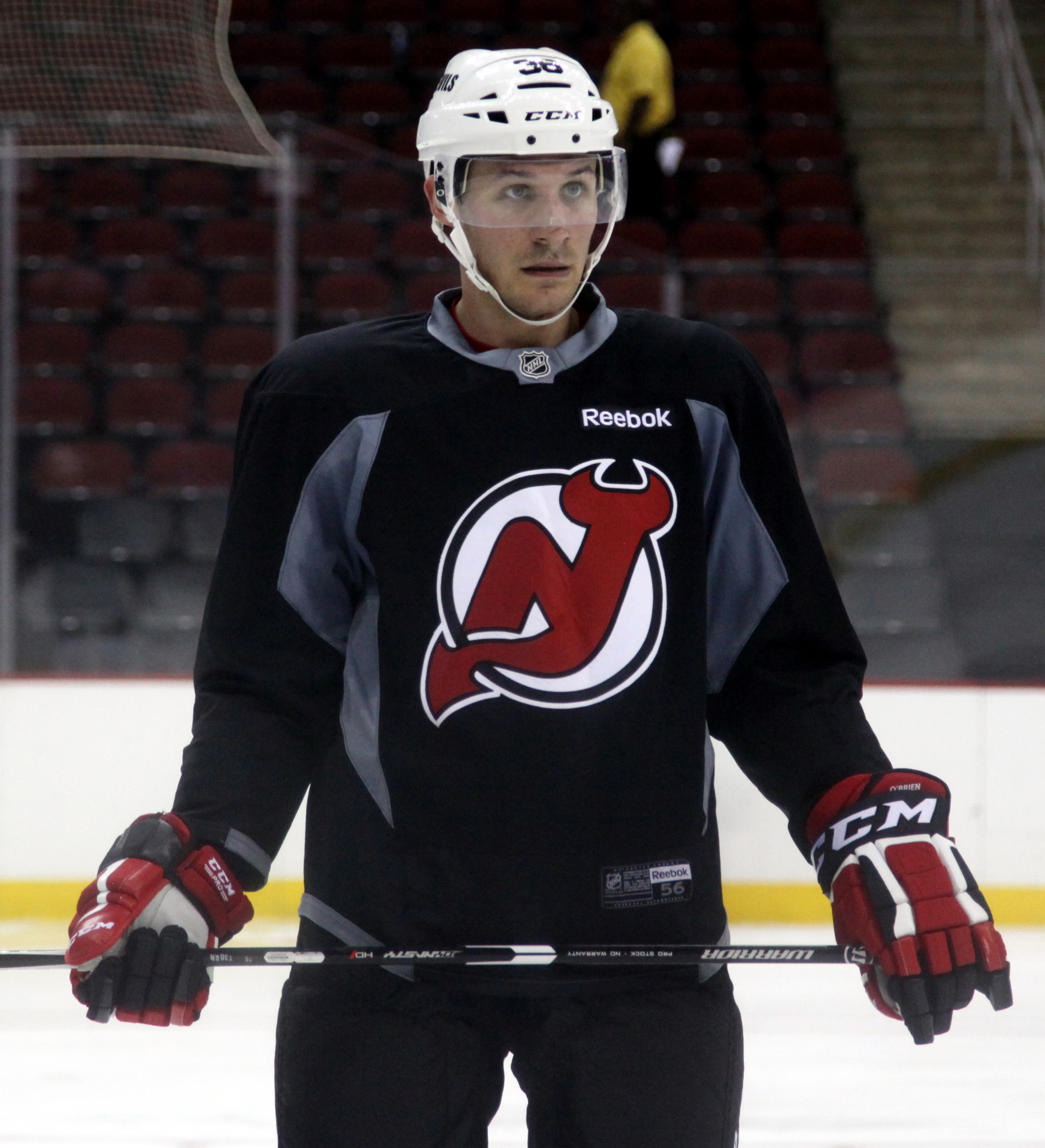
- O'Brien at New Jersey Devils Training Camp in 2015
- Born: January 29, 1989 (age 37) Maplewood, Minnesota, U.S.
- Height: 6 ft 2 in (188 cm)
- Weight: 200 lb (91 kg; 14 st 4 lb)
- Position: Center
- Shot: Right
- team Former teams: Free Agent; Ottawa Senators; Metallurg Novokuznetsk; New Jersey Devils; Thomas Sabo Ice Tigers
- NHL draft: 29th overall, 2007; Ottawa Senators
- Playing career: 2009–2020

James Patrick O'Brien (born January 29, 1989) is an American former ice hockey forward. He played 77 games in the National Hockey League from 2010 to 2018.

== Playing career ==
O'Brien played junior hockey for the United States National Under-18 Team in the NAHL from 2004 until 2006. He then entered the University of Minnesota and played a season of hockey for the Golden Gophers as a 17-year-old. He had to receive an exception to play in university hockey; he was the youngest player in US college ice hockey.

O'Brien was drafted 29th overall by the Ottawa Senators in the 2007 NHL entry draft. O'Brien played defense before switching in high-school to "play as a power-forward center-ice man" His final Central Scouting rank was 38th. He was picked by Ottawa general manager Bryan Murray because "size matters". O'Brien is a strong skater, he blocks shots and he is a penalty killer. It was the third year in a row that the Senators picked a US-born player. They picked Nick Foligno 28th overall during the 2006 NHL Draft, and Brian Lee ninth overall in 2005.

O'Brien played the following 2007–08 and 2008–09 seasons with the major-junior Seattle Thunderbirds of the Western Hockey League. On March 30, 2009, he turned professional, joining the Binghamton Senators, Ottawa's AHL affiliate.

O'Brien made his National Hockey League debut on December 31, 2010, dressing for the Senators in an away game against the Columbus Blue Jackets. He played a total of six NHL games with Ottawa during the 2010–11 NHL season, registering 11 shots on goal, no points, and two penalty minutes. O'Brien was returned to Binghamton and was a member of the 2011 Calder Cup championship team.

O'Brien returned to Binghamton for the 2011–12 season after attending Ottawa's training camp. He was called up to Ottawa in February 2012 and scored his first NHL goal on February 15, 2012, against the Florida Panthers.

On July 18, 2012, the Ottawa Senators announced that they re-signed O'Brien to a two-year contract.

At the conclusion of his second contract with the Senators, O'Brien was not offered a new contract and signed his first contract abroad with in the Russian Kontinental Hockey League with Metallurg Novokuznetsk. In the 2014–15 season, O'Brien scored a respectable 12 points in 22 games before he opted for a return to North America and secured a release from Metallurg Novokuznetsk on December 14, 2014. On December 26, 2014, O'Brien signalled a return to the AHL in signing with the Wilkes-Barre/Scranton Penguins. He was then immediately claimed off waivers by the Hershey Bears.

On July 1, 2015, O'Brien earned an NHL contract in signing as a free agent to a one-year, two-way deal with the New Jersey Devils. In the 2015–16 season, O'Brien compiled his most productive season in the AHL since 2011, in recording 19 goals and 38 points with the Albany Devils. He was recalled by New Jersey to appear in 4 scoreless games with the Devils.

At the conclusion of the season, O'Brien left the Devils organization as a free agent. On July 1, 2016, he signed a one-year, two-way contract to join the Colorado Avalanche. O'Brien was assigned to bolster AHL affiliate, the San Antonio Rampage for the 2016–17 season. Hampered by injury throughout the campaign, O'Brien was unable to continue his scoring pace with the Rampage, collecting 9 goals and 24 points in 53 games. He was briefly recalled by the Avalanche, but was returned to the AHL without appearing for the club.

As an un-signed free agent over the summer, O'Brien opted to return to familiar settings in accepting a professional try-out contract to start the 2017–18 season with inaugural AHL club the Belleville Senators, affiliate to the Ottawa Senators. After playing in the opening four games of the season, O'Brien's try-out was successful as he secured a one-year AHL deal with Belleville on October 19, 2017. On February 25, 2018, the Ottawa Senators signed O'Brien to a two-year, two-way contract and was then assigned to the Belleville Senators for the remainder of the 2017–18 season. O'Brien was called up to Ottawa on February 26, 2018, after Nick Shore was traded. O'Brien appeared in 10 games, registering 1 assist in his return to the NHL.

In the following season within the Senators organization, O'Brien's 2018–19 campaign was limited to just 11 games with the Belleville Senators due to injury.

As an impending free agent from the Senators, O'Brien opted to return abroad in securing a one-year contract with German club, the Thomas Sabo Ice Tigers of the DEL, on June 18, 2019.

== Personal life ==
O'Brien was among a small group of Senators' players who had planned on attending the 2013 Boston Marathon. O'Brien and the other players had originally intended to be at the marathon's finish line during the time at which bombs exploded, killing and injuring several spectators and runners. Scratches for that night's game against the Boston Bruins, the players changed their plans at the last minute and elected to return to their hotel for a nap instead. "Sure enough I wake up from a nap and have a bunch of text messages. I turn on the TV ... it was just a twist of fate. It's definitely something that's hard to think about it. Thank goodness we didn't go", said O'Brien.

== Career statistics ==
=== Regular season and playoffs ===
			Regular season					Playoffs
Season	Team	League	GP	G	A	Pts	PIM	GP	G	A	Pts	PIM
2004–05	U.S. NTDP U17	USDP	54	16	18	34	51	—	—	—	—	—
2004–05	U.S. NTDP Juniors	NAHL	40	10	12	22	21	—	—	—	—	—
2005–06	U.S. NTDP U18	USDP	51	17	24	41	76	—	—	—	—	—
2005–06	U.S. NTDP U18	NAHL	13	6	10	16	14	—	—	—	—	—
2006–07	University of Minnesota	WCHA	43	7	8	15	51	—	—	—	—	—
2007–08	Seattle Thunderbirds	WHL	70	21	34	55	66	12	2	6	8	14
2008–09	Seattle Thunderbirds	WHL	63	27	35	62	55	5	1	0	1	10
2008–09	Binghamton Senators	AHL	6	0	1	1	0	—	—	—	—	—
2009–10	Binghamton Senators	AHL	76	8	9	17	49	—	—	—	—	—
2010–11	Ottawa Senators	NHL	6	0	0	0	2	—	—	—	—	—
2010–11	Binghamton Senators	AHL	74	24	32	56	67	23	3	4	7	12
2011–12	Ottawa Senators	NHL	28	3	3	6	4	7	0	1	1	0
2011–12	Binghamton Senators	AHL	27	7	7	14	10	—	—	—	—	—
2012–13	Ottawa Senators	NHL	29	5	1	6	8	—	—	—	—	—
2013–14	Binghamton Senators	AHL	51	11	18	29	46	2	1	1	2	2
2014–15	Metallurg Novokuznetsk	KHL	22	2	10	12	30	—	—	—	—	—
2014–15	Hershey Bears	AHL	32	10	19	29	26	10	3	1	4	8
2015–16	New Jersey Devils	NHL	4	0	0	0	2	—	—	—	—	—
2015–16	Albany Devils	AHL	56	19	19	38	48	6	2	3	5	4
2016–17	San Antonio Rampage	AHL	53	9	15	24	42	—	—	—	—	—
2017–18	Ottawa Senators	NHL	10	0	1	1	0	—	—	—	—	—
2017–18	Belleville Senators	AHL	60	13	16	29	44	—	—	—	—	—
2018–19	Belleville Senators	AHL	11	1	2	3	4	—	—	—	—	—
2019–20	Thomas Sabo Ice Tigers	DEL	15	1	1	2	10	—	—	—	—	—
NHL totals			77	8	5	13	16	7	0	1	1	0

=== International ===
Year	Team	Event	Result	GP	G	A	Pts	PIM
2005	United States	U17	5th	5	2	3	5	6
2006	United States	WJC18	1st place, gold medalist(s)	6	3	1	4	6
2007	United States	WJC18	2nd place, silver medalist(s)	7	3	4	7	12
2009	United States	WJC	5th	6	1	3	4	2
Junior totals				24	9	11	20	26

Awards and achievements
Preceded by Nick Foligno	Ottawa Senators first-round draft pick 2007	Succeeded by Erik Karlsson
