= Daniel Rahimi =

Swedish ice hockey player (born 1987)

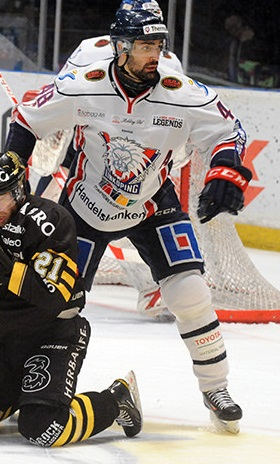
- Born: 28 April 1987 (age 39) Umeå, Sweden
- Height: 6 ft 3 in (191 cm)
- Weight: 209 lb (95 kg; 14 st 13 lb)
- Position: Defence
- Shot: Left
- Played for: Manitoba Moose; Rögle BK; HV71; Linköpings HC; HC Davos; Växjö Lakers
- National team: Sweden
- NHL draft: 82nd overall, 2006; Vancouver Canucks
- Playing career: 2007–2024

Daniel Rahimi (born 28 April 1987) is a Swedish former professional ice hockey defenceman who last played for IF Björklöven in the Hockeyallsvenskan (Allsv.). He was selected by the Vancouver Canucks in the third round (82nd overall) of the 2006 NHL entry draft.

== Playing career ==
After playing with the junior and senior teams of IF Björklöven in the Swedish J20 SuperElit and HockeyAllsvenskan (Swe-1) leagues, Rahimi was selected 82nd overall in the third round of the 2006 NHL entry draft by the Vancouver Canucks. Rahimi was scouted as a stay-at-home defenceman, drafted on the recommendation of the Canucks Swedish scout and former player Thomas Gradin.

Upon being drafted, he returned to IF Björklöven in 2006–07, then joined the Manitoba Moose, the Canucks' American Hockey League (AHL) affiliate, for the playoffs once his season in the HockeyAllsvenskan had finished. In 2007–08, he split the season between the Moose and the Victoria Salmon Kings, the Canucks' ECHL affiliate, scoring five points in 19 ECHL games and five points in 41 AHL games. After spending the 2008–09 season entirely with the Moose, he was traded by the Canucks along with fellow prospect Patrick White to the San Jose Sharks for defencemen Christian Ehrhoff and Brad Lukowich on August 28, 2009.

He returned to Sweden and signed with the Elitserien (SEL) team Rögle BK for the 2009–10 season to make his debut in the top Swedish league. In 55 games, he scored eight points, but in the 2010 Kvalserien regulation tournament, Rögle were relegated to the Swe-1 league. To remain in the SEL league, he signed a two-year contract lasting until the end of the 2011–12 season with HV71. He then signed a two-year contract with Linköpings HC in the same league, expiring after the 2012–13 season. In his last season at the club, 2015-6, he was the league's player who picked up the most penalty minutes in the regular season, with eighty-four PIM in 51 games. This reflected his hard hitting style of defense play.

On 5 March 2016, he signed a one-year contract with HC Davos of the NLA. After one year in Switzerland, Rahimi returned to his native Sweden, signing with the Växjö Lakers in April 2017. He was part their team that won the Le Mat Trophy in the 2017-18 season.

After three years with the Lakers, he returned to his junior club, IF Björklöven for the 2020-21 season, although they were in the second division of Swedish hockey (HockeyAllsvenskan). He remained at the club until his retirement.

== International play ==
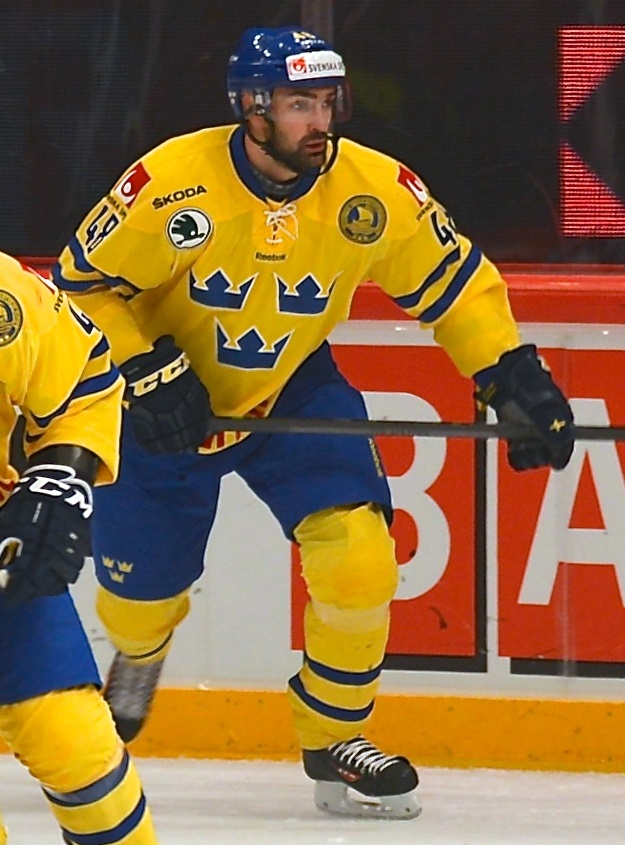

Medal record

Ice hockey

Representing Sweden

World Championships
Bronze medal – third place	2014 Belarus	

Rahimi has played for Sweden in two World Junior Championships. He made his debut at the 2006 World Junior Championships in British Columbia, tallying two points in five games as Sweden finished the tournament in fifth place. At the 2007 World Junior Championships the following year, in his home country, Sweden finished in fourth as the host country. Rahimi did not register a point during the tournament.

Rahimi has played for senior men's team on multiple occasions between 2013 and 2016, after making his international debut on 20 April 2013. That included representing his country in the World Cup tournaments in 2014 and 2015 and winning a bronze with them at the 2014 IIHF World Championships. The defenseman also appeared for his country at the Euro Hockey Tournament every year between 2012-2015.

== Personal life ==
Daniel Rahimi was born in Umeå, Sweden, to an Iranian father and a Swedish mother. He grew up a fan of countryman Mattias Öhlund.

== Career statistics ==
=== Regular season and playoffs ===
			Regular season					Playoffs
Season	Team	League	GP	G	A	Pts	PIM	GP	G	A	Pts	PIM
2003–04	IF Björklöven	J18 Allsv	10	0	3	3	14	—	—	—	—	—
2004–05	IF Björklöven	SWE.2 U20	—	—	—	—	—	—	—	—	—	—
2005–06	IF Björklöven	J20	40	3	10	13	78	6	3	2	5	37
2005–06	IF Björklöven	Allsv	6	0	0	0	4	—	—	—	—	—
2006–07	IF Björklöven	J20	8	0	2	2	18	—	—	—	—	—
2006–07	IF Björklöven	Allsv	33	0	2	2	104	16	0	1	1	14
2006–07	Manitoba Moose	AHL	1	0	0	0	0	4	0	0	0	2
2007–08	Victoria Salmon Kings	ECHL	19	0	5	5	19	—	—	—	—	—
2007–08	Manitoba Moose	AHL	41	3	2	5	37	—	—	—	—	—
2008–09	Manitoba Moose	AHL	58	1	5	6	49	—	—	—	—	—
2009–10	Rögle BK	SEL	55	1	7	8	67	—	—	—	—	—
2010–11	HV71	SEL	44	2	1	3	20	—	—	—	—	—
2010–11	IF Troja/Ljungby	Allsv	4	0	0	0	16	—	—	—	—	—
2011–12	HV71	SEL	54	1	4	5	20	6	0	1	1	6
2012–13	Linköpings HC	SEL	55	0	5	5	56	10	0	1	1	10
2013–14	Linköpings HC	SHL	48	1	8	9	48	14	0	1	1	18
2014–15	Linköpings HC	SHL	54	2	12	14	38	11	1	2	3	41
2015–16	Linköpings HC	SHL	51	3	11	14	84	6	1	0	1	4
2016–17	HC Davos	NLA	44	0	4	4	26	10	0	0	0	16
2017–18	Växjö Lakers	SHL	43	4	10	14	75	13	2	2	4	39
2018–19	Växjö Lakers	SHL	51	0	7	7	38	7	0	2	2	2
2019–20	Växjö Lakers	SHL	52	0	4	4	32	—	—	—	—	—
2020–21	IF Björklöven	Allsv	35	2	6	8	30	9	0	1	1	31
2021–22	IF Björklöven	Allsv	51	4	5	9	40	18	1	2	3	69
2022–23	IF Björklöven	Allsv	52	6	15	21	14	8	2	2	4	2
2023–24	IF Björklöven	Allsv	50	1	7	8	20	5	0	1	1	4
SHL totals			507	14	69	83	478	67	4	9	13	120
AHL totals			100	4	7	11	88	4	0	0	0	2

=== International ===
Year	Team	Event	Result	GP	G	A	Pts	PIM
2007	Sweden	WJC	4th	7	0	0	0	18
2014	Sweden	WC	3rd place, bronze medalist(s)	2	0	0	0	0
2015	Sweden	WC	5th	6	0	0	0	14
Junior totals				7	0	0	0	18
Senior totals				8	0	0	0	14

== Awards and honours ==
Award	Year
SHL
Le Mat Trophy	2018
