= Johan Motin =

Swedish ice hockey player

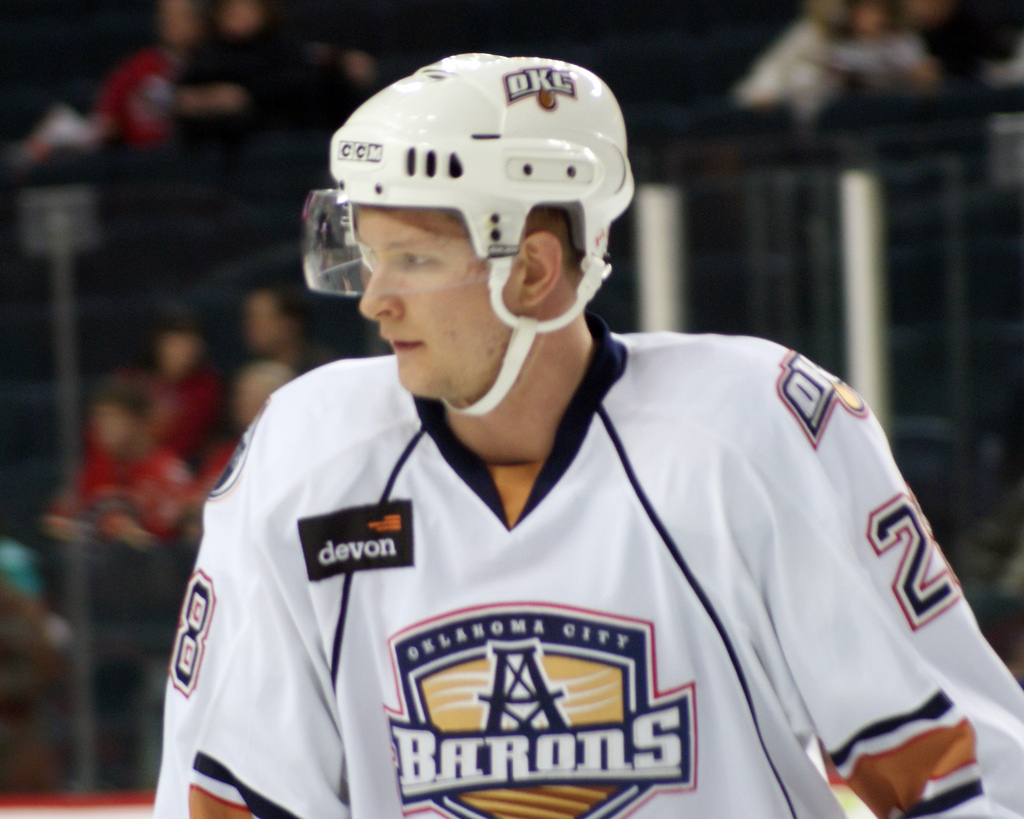
- Motin in 2011 with the Oklahoma City Barons
- Born: October 10, 1989 (age 36) Karlskoga, Sweden
- Height: 6 ft 2 in (188 cm)
- Weight: 212 lb (96 kg; 15 st 2 lb)
- Position: Defence
- Shoots: Right
- Liiga team Former teams: HIFK; Örebro HK; Färjestad BK; Edmonton Oilers; Timrå IK
- NHL draft: 103rd overall, 2008; Edmonton Oilers
- Playing career: 2006–present

Johan Motin (born October 10, 1989) is a Swedish professional ice hockey defenceman. He is currently playing with HIFK of the Finnish Liiga. Motin was selected by the Edmonton Oilers in the 4th round (103rd overall) of the 2008 NHL entry draft, and played one game with them during the 2009–10 season.

== Playing career ==
Motin joined Färjestads BK's junior team in 2005. The following year, Motin was called up to play with Färjestads' senior team. He made his debut against Timrå IK on December 7, 2006. Since that game, he became a regular player in Färjestads' line-up. Motin was ranked as a top prospect by the ISS, who in December 2007, ranked him as the 13th pick of the draft.

During his second season in the Elitserien, Motin struggled to get ice time, and in December 2007, he was loaned to Bofors IK to get some more ice time and be better prepared for the World Junior Championships. After the WJC, he returned to Färjestad and got an assist on a goal by Esa Pirnes in his first game back.

On June 21, 2008, Motin was drafted by the Edmonton Oilers of the National Hockey League (NHL), selecting him in the fourth round of the 2008 NHL entry draft, 103rd overall. On May 19, 2009, the Oilers announced that they had signed Motin to a three-year entry-level contract.

He was assigned to the Oilers' then American Hockey League affiliate, the Springfield Falcons, for the 2009–10 season. During the campaign, Motin was called up to the Edmonton Oilers on an emergency basis on March 3, 2010, and he played in his first-ever NHL game.

In the following season, Motin was reassigned to the Oilers' new AHL affiliate, the Oklahoma City Barons for their inaugural season. In the final year of his contract with the Oilers in 2011–12, Motin appeared in just 10 games with the Barons before opting from a release from his contract to return to Sweden with Timrå IK of the Elitserien on November 15, 2011.

== International play ==
Medal record

Representing Sweden

Men's ice hockey

IIHF World U18 Championships
Bronze medal – third place	2007 Finland	

World Junior Hockey Championships
Silver medal – second place	2008 Czech Republic	

Motin represented Sweden at the 2008 World Junior Ice Hockey Championships and won a silver medal. In 2007, he also represented Sweden at U18 World Championship and won a bronze medal.

== Personal life ==
Motin is of Finnish descent through his Finnish-born father.

== Career statistics ==
=== Regular season and playoffs ===
			Regular season					Playoffs
Season	Team	League	GP	G	A	Pts	PIM	GP	G	A	Pts	PIM
2005–06	Färjestad BK J18	SWE-U18	14	0	7	7	6	8	0	2	2	8
2006–07	Färjestad BK	SWE	22	0	4	4	8	9	0	0	0	2
2006–07	Skåre BK	SWE-3	18	0	4	4	30	—	—	—	—	—
2006–07	Färjestad BK J18	SWE-U18	1	0	0	0	0	1	1	1	2	2
2007–08	Färjestad BK	SWE	28	0	2	2	10	—	—	—	—	—
2007–08	Bofors IK	SWE-2	15	2	3	5	18	—	—	—	—	—
2007–08	Skåre BK	SWE-3	3	0	2	2	2	—	—	—	—	—
2008–09	Färjestad BK	SWE	52	0	3	3	28	13	0	1	1	6
2008–09	Skåre BK	SWE-3	8	0	3	3	8	—	—	—	—	—
2009–10	Edmonton Oilers	NHL	1	0	0	0	0	—	—	—	—	—
2009–10	Springfield Falcons	AHL	55	1	5	6	33	—	—	—	—	—
2010–11	Oklahoma City Barons	AHL	34	1	3	4	30	—	—	—	—	—
2010–11	Stockton Thunder	ECHL	14	1	1	2	12	1	0	1	1	0
2011–12	Oklahoma City Barons	AHL	10	0	2	2	8	—	—	—	—	—
2011–12	Timrå IK	SWE	33	0	2	2	18	—	—	—	—	—
2012–13	Örebro HK	SWE-2	50	3	10	13	38	—	—	—	—	—
2013–14	Örebro HK	SWE	54	1	7	8	42	—	—	—	—	—
2014–15	Örebro HK	SWE	51	4	9	13	51	6	0	1	1	6
2015–16	Örebro HK	SWE	48	1	6	7	41	2	0	0	0	2
2016–17	Örebro HK	SWE	43	1	6	7	43	—	—	—	—	—
2017–18	Lukko	FIN	59	2	12	14	22	2	0	0	0	10
2018–19	HIFK	FIN	60	1	12	13	48	13	0	1	1	8
2019–20	HIFK	FIN	59	2	11	13	55	—	—	—	—	—
2020–21	HIFK	FIN	44	2	10	12	48	8	0	4	4	0
2021–22	HIFK	FIN	59	3	12	15	34	2	0	0	0	25
NHL totals			1	0	0	0	0	—	—	—	—	—
FIN totals			281	10	57	67	207	25	0	5	5	43

=== International ===
Year	Team	Event	GP	G	A	Pts	PIM
2007	Sweden	U18	5	0	3	3	6
2008	Sweden	WJC	6	0	0	0	6
Junior totals			11	0	3	3	12

== See also ==
- List of players who played only one game in the NHL
