= Cade Fairchild =

American ice hockey player (born 1989)

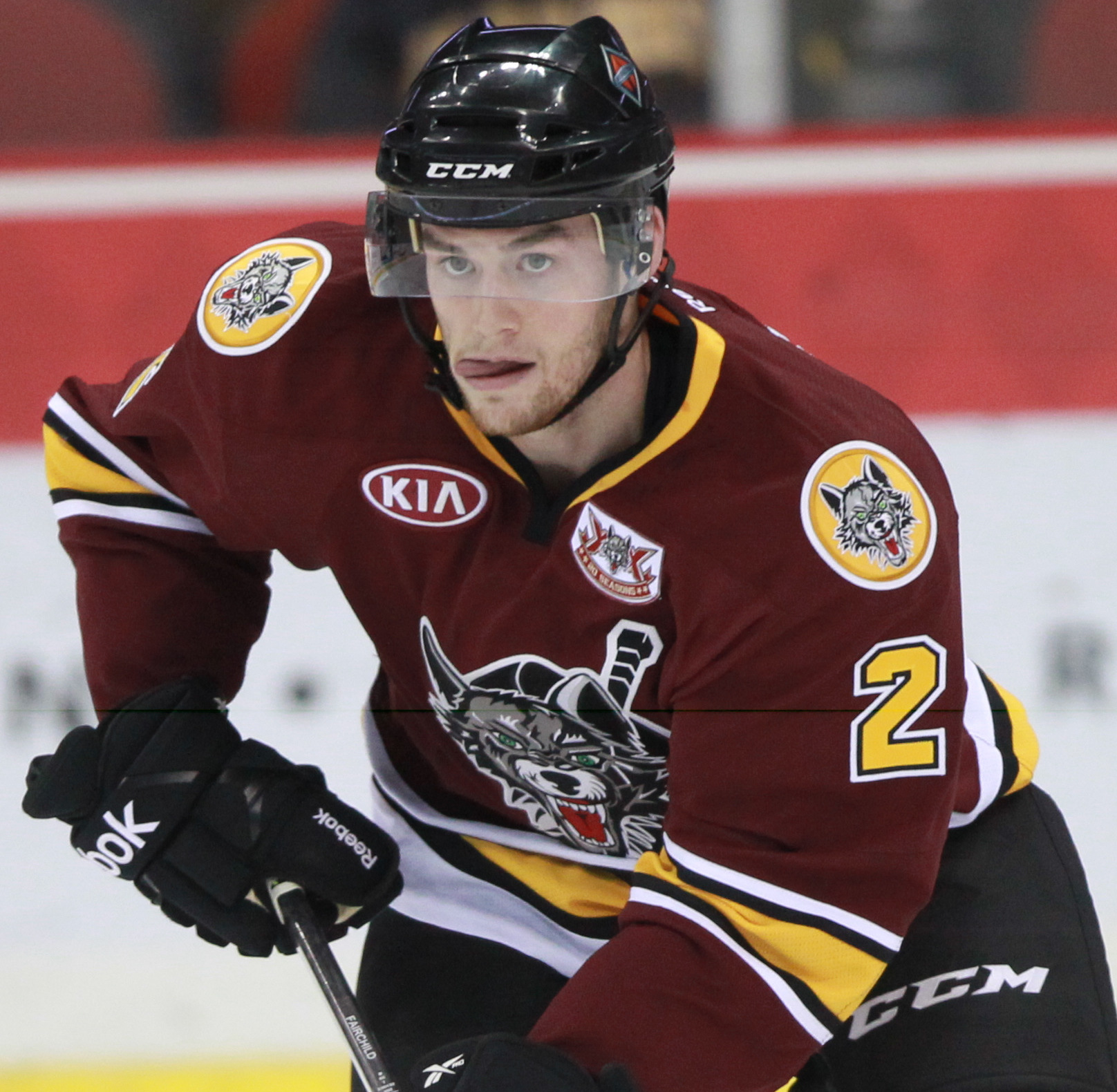
- Fairchild with the Chicago Wolves in 2013
- Born: January 15, 1989 (age 37) Duluth, Minnesota, U.S.
- Height: 5 ft 11 in (180 cm)
- Weight: 180 lb (82 kg; 12 st 12 lb)
- Position: Defense
- Shot: Left
- Played for: St. Louis Blues; Metallurg Novokuznetsk; Rögle BK; Dinamo Riga; KalPa
- NHL draft: 96th overall, 2007; St. Louis Blues
- Playing career: 2011–2019

Cade Patrick Fairchild (born January 15, 1989) is an American former professional ice hockey defenseman. He was selected by the St. Louis Blues in the 4th round (96th overall) of the 2007 NHL entry draft.

Fairchild competed at the 2006 IIHF World U18 Championships where he won a gold medal as a member of Team USA. He was also a member of the USA U-18 team at the 2007 IIHF U-18 World Championship, where he led all defensemen in points.

== Playing career ==
Before turning professional, Fairchild attended the University of Minnesota where he was the top scoring defenseman with the Minnesota Golden Gophers men's ice hockey team which competes in NCAA's Division I in the WCHA conference. On March 18, 2011, Fairchild was signed to a three-year entry-level contract with the St. Louis Blues.

On November 29, 2011, Fairchild made his NHL debut playing 14 shifts in the Blues' 2-1 victory over the home team Washington Capitals. Five days after his NHL debut, Fairchild was returned to the Peoria Rivermen of the American Hockey League (AHL).

In 2012, Fairchild was named an AHL All-Star and also named to the AHL All-Rookie Team. He was recalled 4 times to St. Louis and played 5 games, tallying 1 assist.

During the 2013–14 season, having had his season hampered by injury and his development stagnating within the Blues organization, on March 12, 2014 Fairchild was traded by St. Louis to the Phoenix Coyotes and assigned to their AHL affiliate, the Portland Pirates.

Fairchild was not re-signed by the Coyotes, and on July 8, 2014, he agreed to a one-year with Russian club, Metallurg Novokuznetsk of the KHL. He left Metallurg after a second season with the club and took up an offer from Sweden, signing with Rögle BK on July 9, 2016.

In October 2018, Fairchild joined KalPa in the Finnish Liiga from Dinamo Riga in the Kontinental Hockey League.

== Career statistics ==
=== Regular season and playoffs ===
			Regular season					Playoffs
Season	Team	League	GP	G	A	Pts	PIM	GP	G	A	Pts	PIM
2005–06	U.S. National Development Team	NAHL	36	8	9	17	10	—	—	—	—	—
2006–07	U.S. National Development Team	NAHL	13	1	6	7	16	—	—	—	—	—
2007–08	University of Minnesota	WCHA	40	2	13	15	22	—	—	—	—	—
2008–09	University of Minnesota	WCHA	35	9	24	33	52	—	—	—	—	—
2009–10	University of Minnesota	WCHA	39	4	17	21	36	—	—	—	—	—
2010–11	University of Minnesota	WCHA	35	6	18	24	12	—	—	—	—	—
2011–12	Peoria Rivermen	AHL	68	8	26	34	32	—	—	—	—	—
2011–12	St. Louis Blues	NHL	5	0	1	1	0	—	—	—	—	—
2012–13	Peoria Rivermen	AHL	43	0	8	8	16	—	—	—	—	—
2013–14	Chicago Wolves	AHL	33	2	19	21	18	—	—	—	—	—
2013–14	Kalamazoo Wings	ECHL	2	0	0	0	2	—	—	—	—	—
2013–14	Portland Pirates	AHL	14	0	4	4	6	—	—	—	—	—
2014–15	Metallurg Novokuznetsk	KHL	53	4	10	14	28	—	—	—	—	—
2015–16	Metallurg Novokuznetsk	KHL	56	4	18	22	16	—	—	—	—	—
2016–17	Rögle BK	SHL	50	6	24	30	14	—	—	—	—	—
2017–18	Rögle BK	SHL	20	1	3	4	16	—	—	—	—	—
2018–19	Dinamo Riga	KHL	6	1	0	1	0	—	—	—	—	—
2018–19	KalPa	Liiga	41	3	10	13	18	—	—	—	—	—
NHL totals			5	0	1	1	0	—	—	—	—	—
KHL totals			115	9	28	37	44	—	—	—	—	—

=== International ===
Year	Team	Event	Result	GP	G	A	Pts	PIM
2006	United States	U17	2nd place, silver medalist(s)	6	1	1	2	0
2006	United States	WJC18	1st place, gold medalist(s)	6	0	0	0	0
2007	United States	WJC18	2nd place, silver medalist(s)	7	1	6	7	10
2008	United States	WJC	4th	6	0	1	1	4
2009	United States	WJC	5th	6	1	3	4	2
Junior totals				31	3	11	14	16

== Awards and honors ==
Award	Year
College
WCHA All-Rookie Team	2007–08
WCHA All-Academic Team	2010–11
