= Tomi Pallassalo =

Finnish ice hockey player

- Born: 17 August 1989 (age 35); Helsinki, FIN
- Height: 5 ft 10 in (178 cm)
- Weight: 170 lb (77 kg; 12 st 2 lb)
- Position: Forward
- Shoots: Left
- SM-liiga team: Jokerit
- Playing career: 2009–present

Tomi Pallassalo (born 17 August 1989 in Helsinki, Finland) is a retired Finnish professional ice hockey forward, who played for Jokerit in Finnish SM-liiga
