= Robin Olsson =

Swedish ice hockey player

- Born: May 30, 1989 (age 37) Luleå, Sweden
- Height: 5 ft 10 in (178 cm)
- Weight: 174 lb (79 kg; 12 st 6 lb)
- Position: Defence
- Shot: Left
- Played for: Luleå HF; Örebro HK; AIK IF
- Playing career: 2007–2015

Robin Olsson (born May 30, 1989, in Luleå) is a Swedish ice hockey player. He is currently playing with Luleå HF in the Elitserien.

== Career statistics ==
			Regular season					Playoffs
Season	Team	League	GP	G	A	Pts	PIM	GP	G	A	Pts	PIM
2005–06	Luleå HF J18	J18 Elit	—	—	—	—	—	—	—	—	—	—
2006–07	Luleå HF J20	J20 SuperElit	26	4	6	10	26	—	—	—	—	—
2007–08	Luleå HF J20	J20 SuperElit	15	0	1	1	10	—	—	—	—	—
2007–08	Luleå HF	Elitserien	34	1	1	2	0	—	—	—	—	—
2008–09	Luleå HF J20	J20 SuperElit	14	3	6	9	14	6	0	1	1	10
2008–09	Luleå HF	Elitserien	39	0	2	2	8	5	0	0	0	0
2009–10	Luleå HF J20	J20 SuperElit	4	1	1	2	6	—	—	—	—	—
2009–10	Luleå HF	Elitserien	20	0	1	1	2	—	—	—	—	—
2009–10	Örebro HK	HockeyAllsvenskan	25	4	7	11	8	—	—	—	—	—
2010–11	Örebro HK	HockeyAllsvenskan	16	0	2	2	6	—	—	—	—	—
2011–12	Örebro HK	HockeyAllsvenskan	41	2	14	16	12	9	0	1	1	2
2012–13	Örebro HK	HockeyAllsvenskan	36	5	5	10	14	—	—	—	—	—
2013–14	Örebro HK J20	J20 SuperElit	3	1	1	2	2	—	—	—	—	—
2014–15	AIK IF	HockeyAllsvenskan	19	0	5	5	8	—	—	—	—	—
Elitserien totals			93	1	4	5	10	5	0	0	0	0
HockeyAllsvenskan totals			137	11	33	44	48	9	0	1	1	2
