= Radim Valchař =

Czech ice hockey forward

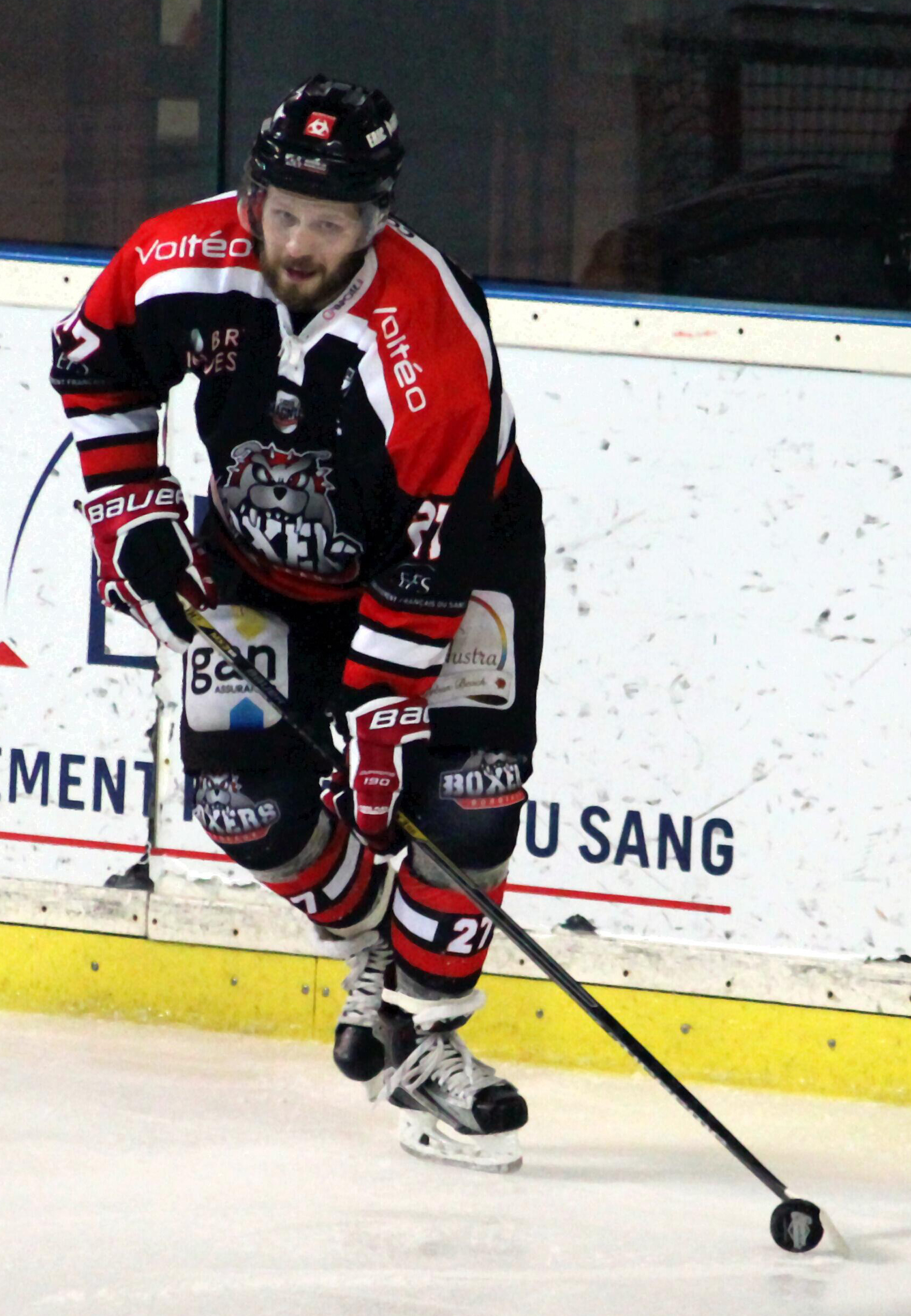
- Radim Valchar during Match bordeaux Strasbourg
- Born: 20 April 1989 (age 36); Karviná, Czechoslovakia
- Height: 6 ft 0 in (183 cm)
- Weight: 205 lb (93 kg; 14 st 9 lb)
- Position: Left wing
- Shoots: Left
- Erste Liga team Former teams: CSM Corona Brașov; HC 46 Bardejov; Rapaces de Gap; Hokki; Boxers de Bordeaux; HSC Csíkszereda; DVTK Jegesmedvék
- National team: Romania
- Playing career: 2006–present

Radim Valchař (born 20 April 1989) is a Czech-born Romanian professional ice hockey left winger currently playing for CSM Corona Brașov of the Erste Liga.

== Career ==
Valchař began his career with HC Vítkovice and played one game for the team during the 2006–07 Czech Extraliga season. He was then drafted 4th overall of the 2007 CHL Import Draft by the Portland Winterhawks of the Western Hockey League and spent two seasons in Portland before being traded to the Lethbridge Hurricanes in 2009. He played just 13 games for Lethbridge before returning to the Czech Republic with HC Orlová of the Czech 2. Liga.

He then had spells with HC Karviná of the 2. Liga and HC 46 Bardejov of the Slovak 1. Liga before moving to Rapaces de Gap of the French Ligue Magnus on 21 March 2013. On 8 May 2015, Valchař joined Finnish Mestis team Hokki. He played 11 games before returning to France with Boxers de Bordeaux in October of the same year. Valchař then joined Romanian team HSC Csíkszereda in 2016.

Valchař played in the 2009 World Junior Ice Hockey Championships for the Czech Republic.
