= Äijänsuo Ice Hall =

Arena in Rauma, Finland

Coordinates: 61°07′14″N 21°30′11″E

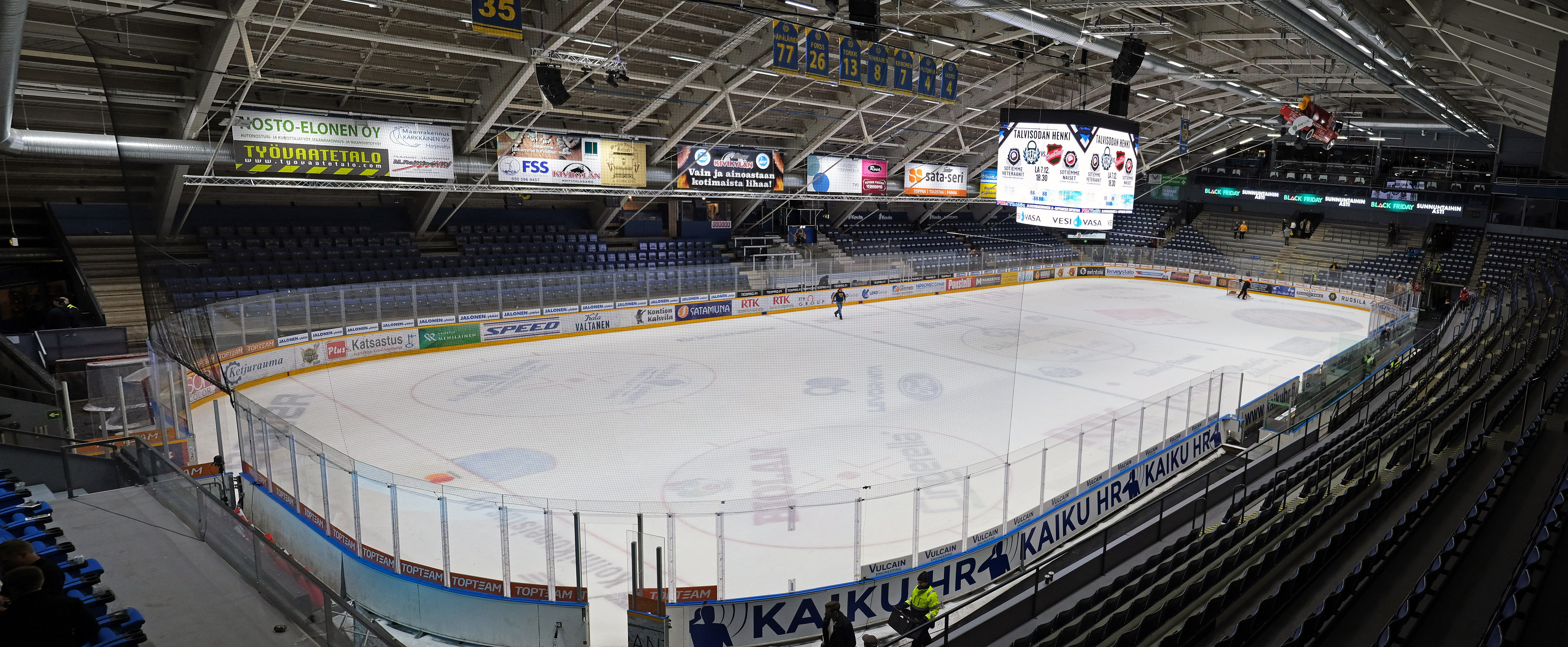
Äijänsuo Ice Hall

Äijänsuo Ice Hall is an arena in Rauma, Finland. It is primarily used for ice hockey, and is the home arena of Lukko. It opened in 1970 and holds 5,400 people. The name of the arena was changed to "Lännen Puhelin Areena" in autumn 2006. And it changed in year 2007 to DNA Areena, when DNA bought/formed with Lännen Puhelin. Now the name is "Kivikylän areena". Opening match of the U18 World Championships will be played at Äijänsuo with Finland hosting Sweden.
