= Jānis Straupe =

Latvian ice hockey player

- Born: 3 June 1989 (age 35); Riga, Latvian SSR, Soviet Union
- Height: 183 cm (6 ft 0 in)
- Weight: 82 kg (181 lb; 12 st 13 lb)
- Position: Forward
- Shot: Right
- Played for: SK Rīga 18; SK LSPA/Rīga; Riga 2000; Dinamo Riga; Heinolan Kiekko; Metalurgs Liepaja; Tønsberg Vikings; Bilyi Bars
- Playing career: 2004–present

Jānis Straupe (born 3 June 1989) is a Latvian ice hockey forward who plays for HK Kurbads in the Latvian Hockey League.

Straupe has also played several games for Dinamo Riga of the Kontinental Hockey League.
