= Etienne Froidevaux =

Swiss ice hockey player

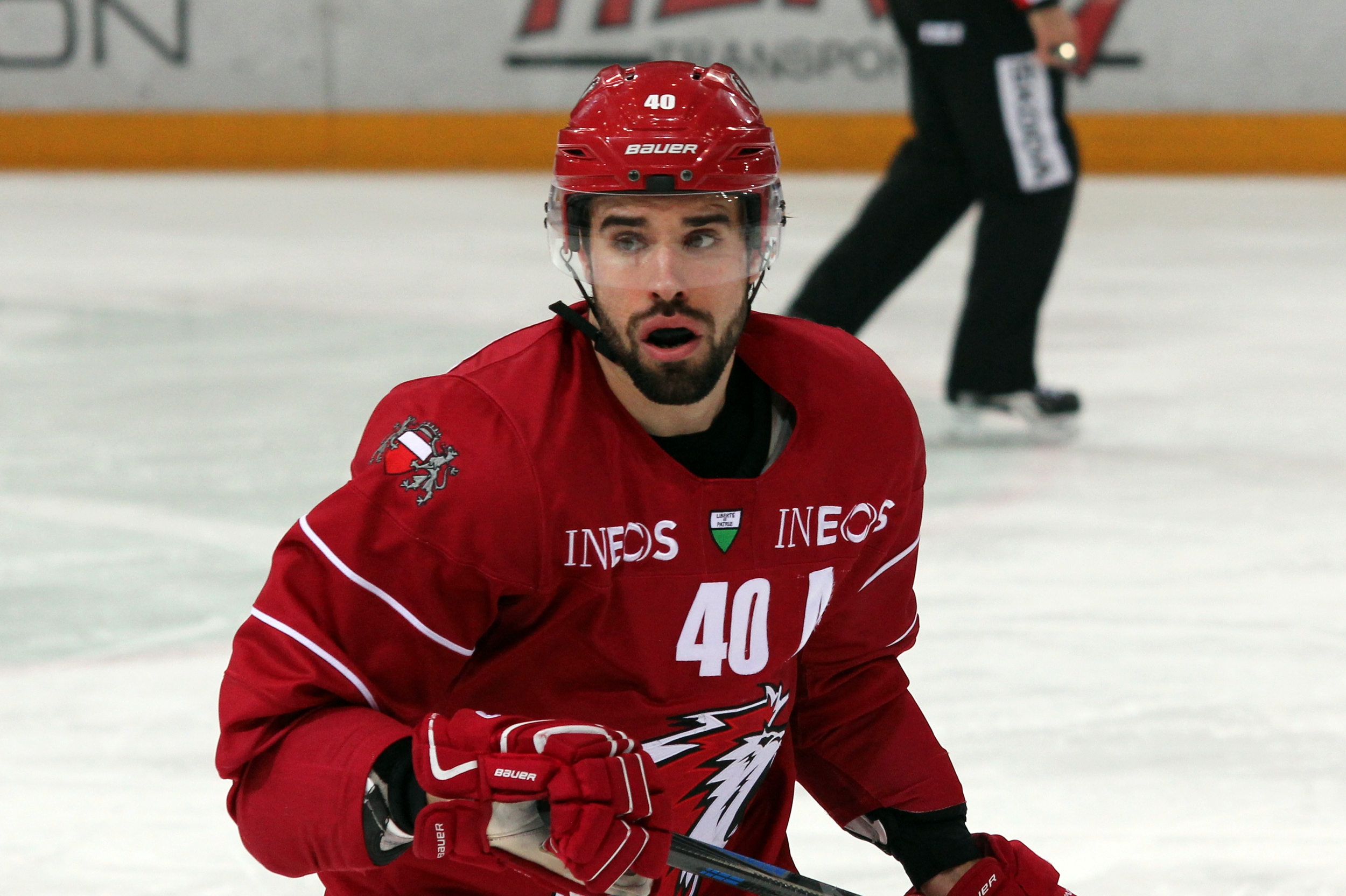
- Born: March 20, 1989 (age 35); Biel, Switzerland
- Height: 5 ft 11 in (180 cm)
- Weight: 196 lb (89 kg; 14 st 0 lb)
- Position: Centre
- Shoots: Left
- NL team Former teams: EHC Biel; SC Bern; SCL Tigers; Lausanne HC
- National team: Switzerland
- Playing career: 2007–present

Etienne Froidevaux (born March 20, 1989) is a Swiss professional ice hockey player who currently plays for EHC Biel of the National League (NL).

During the 2022–23 season, while in his second year with EHC Biel, Froidevaux announced he would be retiring following the completion of his 17th professional season.
