= Alexei Cherepanov =

Russian ice hockey player (1989–2008)

- Born: 15 January 1989 Ozerki, Russian SFSR, Soviet Union
- Died: 13 October 2008 (aged 19) Chekhov, Russia
- Height: 6 ft 1 in (185 cm)
- Weight: 183 lb (83 kg; 13 st 1 lb)
- Position: Right wing
- Shot: Left
- Played for: Avangard Omsk
- NHL draft: 17th overall, 2007; New York Rangers
- Playing career: 2005–2008

Alexei Andreyevich Cherepanov (Russian: Алексей Андреевич Черепанов; 15 January 1989 – 13 October 2008) was a Russian professional ice hockey player. He was a winger for Avangard Omsk of the Kontinental Hockey League (KHL). Previously, Cherepanov had played for Avangard's lower-level teams, and then for the senior men's team in the Russian Super League. Cherepanov was selected in the first round (17th overall) of the 2007 National Hockey League (NHL) Entry Draft by the New York Rangers, although he never played professional hockey in North America. Cherepanov represented Russia in international play, and played in several tournaments at the junior level. He won a gold medal at the 2007 World Under-18 Championships. While playing at the Under-20 level, Cherepanov won silver and bronze medals in 2007 and 2008.

During a KHL game in October 2008, Cherepanov collapsed on the bench near the end of the game, and could not be resuscitated. He was pronounced dead later that day in hospital at age 19. His cause of death was attributed to heart failure, although there were varying reports as to the specific nature of his underlying medical condition. After his death, the KHL launched an investigation into the emergency response provided by the home team during the game, and also into team officials and physicians for their treatment and management of Cherepanov's health during his career. Avangard retired Cherepanov's #7 jersey after his death, and the KHL renamed its Rookie of the Year trophy to the Alexei Cherepanov Trophy.

== Playing career ==
Cherepanov was born in Siberia, and played minor hockey for the Motor Barnaul organization. The remote location of his youth hockey play made Cherepanov an unknown quantity until he left the region to join the Avangard Omsk organization. He made his debut for the team in the Russian third division during the 2005–06 season, appearing in five games and scoring two goals. During the 2006–07 season, Cherepanov split time between Avangard's club in the Russian Superleague (RSL) and the Russian third division. While playing with the top-level club, Cherepanov scored 18 goals and added 11 assists in 46 games. His 18 goals set a RSL record for players his age, and exceeded the production of his Russian predecessors, Alexander Ovechkin and Evgeni Malkin, when they were at the same level. For his play the previous season, Cherepanov was named RSL Newcomer of the Year.

Cherepanov was eligible for the 2007 National Hockey League (NHL) Entry Draft after the 2006–07 season. Throughout most of the season leading up to the draft, Cherepanov was the top ranked prospect in Europe. Prior to the draft, Cherepanov attended the NHL Scouting Combine, allowing clubs to evaluate his physical attributes and schedule interviews, if they needed additional information prior to his selection. Those attending the combine were struck by Cherepanov's apparent physical immaturity, pointing out his low number of bench press repetitions, and his physique. His performance during the interview portion of the event was more impressive, with team personnel impressed with his maturity and good attitude. At the draft, Cherepanov was selected by the New York Rangers in the first round of the draft, 17th overall. Some attributed Cherepanov's lower draft selection to concerns about his availability for the NHL, considering the lack of a transfer agreement between the NHL and the International Ice Hockey Federation (IIHF) concerning Russian players. Analyst Pierre McGuire believed Cherepanov was a legitimate NHL prospect, stating, "He was built for the new-age NHL with his speed, his skill and his ability to make things happen offensively." Cherepanov was excited to be selected by the Rangers, saying, "I believe that New York is the center of the United States and I'm very happy to be selected by the New York Rangers."

Cherepanov attended the Rangers' prospect camp shortly after he was drafted in 2007. At the start of the 2007–08 season, Cherepanov returned to Avangard playing in 46 games and scoring 15 goals, this time in the newly created Kontinental Hockey League (KHL). Entering the 2008–09 KHL season, Cherepanov had one year remaining on his contract with Omsk. The Rangers had been attempting to have Cherepanov released from the contract since shortly after he was drafted. During the 2008–09 season, Cherepanov was joined on the Avangard roster by Czech forward Jaromír Jágr. Cherepanov played 14 games with Avangard in 2008. At the time of his death, he was second on the team in goals with seven, and fourth in points.

== International play ==
Medal record

Representing Russia

Men's ice hockey

World Junior Championship
Silver medal – second place	2007 Leksand	
Bronze medal – third place	2008 Pardubice	

World U18 Championships
Gold medal – first place	2007 Tampere	

Cherepanov represented Russia at multiple age level tournaments during his junior hockey career. He made his international debut at under-20 level in 2007, at the tournament in Sweden. Cherepanov and the Russian team finished with the silver medal after losing to Canada in the gold medal game. Cherepanov was named the tournament's Best Forward and also secured a spot on the tournament All-Star Team. He scored five goals and added three assists to finish with eight points. He was also selected by his coaches as one of Russia's three best players for the tournament. Later that same year, Cherepanov stepped down to his age group and helped Russia win the gold medal at the 2007 IIHF World U18 Championships, scoring a goal in the final against the United States. Cherepanov was named Russia's Player of the Game for the gold medal game. Cherepanov earned a spot on the tournament All-Star Team, and was selected as one of Russia's top three players again.

The 2007 Super Series was a tournament that pitted the top junior hockey players in Canada and Russia against each other in an 8-game series to commemorate the 35th anniversary of the 1972 Summit Series. After being drafted by the New York Rangers earlier in the summer, Cherepanov was one of the biggest names on Russia's roster heading into the series. In the second game of the series, Cherepanov suffered a concussion after a hit from Brandon Sutter and was out for the remainder of the series.

Cherepanov's final international appearance for Russia came at the 2008 World Junior Championships, where he helped Russia to a bronze medal. He was particularly effective in the third place game, recording 3 points during a 4–2 victory over the United States. He finished the event with six total points (three goals and three assists).

== Playing style ==
Cherepanov was an offensive forward. His agent, Jay Grossman, said "He was an exceptionally talented kid." The NHL Central Scouting Bureau identified his offensive skills as the biggest strength of his game, and felt he needed to work on his physical play and consistency. Rangers head scout Gordie Clark said Cherepanov had a special talent for scoring goals.

== Death ==
Cherepanov died on 13 October 2008 after collapsing during the third period of a KHL game against Vityaz Chekhov. After finishing a shift, Cherepanov skated to the bench with his teammates, Jaromír Jágr and Pavel Rosa, where according to coach Wayne Fleming, "He just laid back, passed out and went kind of white." Jagr immediately shouted for assistance. Attempts were made to revive Cherepanov at the bench, and when they were unsuccessful he was carried back to the team's dressing room by his teammates, where doctors continued to work. Cherepanov was transferred to a local hospital but he was pronounced dead later that evening. Initial reports claimed that he had died of a heart attack.

Despite being from a town over 400 miles away from Omsk, Cherepanov's family wanted him to be buried in Omsk, a city that had embraced him during his young hockey career. Thousands of people attended his funeral. His casket was available for viewing on the ice in Avangard's arena before being carried to Staro-Severnoye Cemetery for interment.

=== Investigation ===
In the immediate aftermath of Cherepanov's death, there were many conflicting reports and accusations. Early reports indicated that Cherepanov suffered from chronic myocardial ischemia, and many reports questioned Avangard Omsk's medical staff and why they were unaware of his heart condition. Other reports claimed that Cherepanov's autopsy showed evidence of myocarditis. Outside doctors, particularly in North America were skeptical of this early explanation, believing it unlikely that a young, elite athlete would suffer from an undiagnosed form of ischemia, particularly when considering the medical testing he underwent prior to the NHL draft. Further reports out of Russia suggested a hypertrophic heart, which would be more in line with other cases of sudden death in athletes. In addition to issues with the immediate cause of death for Cherepanov, Russian officials immediately launched an investigation into the emergency response by the team, facilities and paramedics on site. Initial concerns were raised as to why Cherepanov had been allowed to play, if he had a heart condition that should have been picked up by routine medical tests that he was believed to have undergone. The ambulance that is required to be on duty at all KHL games had already left, as there were only five minutes left in the game, and the defibrillator in the arena was non-functional.

The investigation into Cherepanov's death continued for several months. In December, reports out of Russia indicated that blood and urine samples collected from Cherepanov showed that he had been engaged in blood doping. This was later clarified, as Russian officials said that what initially appeared to be blood doping was actually an attempt by team officials and doctors to treat Cherepanov's condition surreptitiously. After this revelation in January 2009, the KHL suspended five Avangard officials and doctors for attempting to treat a condition which should have only been managed by experienced cardiologists. The investigation into Cherepanov's death was reopened in August 2009, after federal prosecutors ruled that the previously suspended team physicians were unaware of his heart condition, and had not prescribed the medications he was taking. Cherepanov's agent, Jay Grossman stated that tests conducted by the NHL prior to the 2007 Entry Draft had not shown any health problems.

=== Legacy ===
Shortly after Cherepanov's death, Avangard Omsk retired his #7 jersey in a ceremony prior to a game against Dynamo Minsk, with his parents in the crowd. The KHL renamed its Rookie of the Year award the "Alexei Cherepanov Award" starting in 2009. An under-20 tournament, held in August 2013, was dedicated to his memory. The tournament featured 6 teams including two Russian clubs, and national sides from Great Britain, Poland, Belarus and host Lithuania.

The KHL examined their policies immediately following Cherepanov's death, particularly as concerns were raised about the effectiveness of the emergency response. New regulations were enacted requiring that two ambulances be present at every KHL game. They also called on the Russian government to enforce minimum standards for the equipment on ambulances. The league also instituted a program that would allow key personnel to have access to a standard set of medical information about all players in the league, dubbed a "medical passport."

After his death, the New York Rangers sought compensation in the form of an extra draft pick from the NHL. As Cherepanov had not agreed to terms with the club at the time of his death, the team claimed that he would technically have been eligible to be selected in the 2009 NHL entry draft, and they were entitled to compensation. The team was eventually awarded the 17th selection of the second round in the 2009 draft, after the Rangers' proposal was approved by the rest of the league. NHL general managers also voted to adopt a rule change, dubbed the "Cherepanov rule" that would see any future teams receive compensation if a prospect selected in the first round dies before signing a contract.

== Career statistics ==
=== Regular season and playoffs ===
			Regular season					Playoffs
Season	Team	League	GP	G	A	Pts	PIM	GP	G	A	Pts	PIM
2005–06	Omskie Yastreby	RUS.3	4	2	0	0	2	—	—	—	—	—
2006–07	Avangard–2 Omsk	RUS.3	3	1	0	1	0	—	—	—	—	—
2006–07	Avangard Omsk	RSL	46	18	11	29	45	10	3	5	8	0
2007–08	Avangard Omsk	RSL	46	15	13	28	12	4	2	1	3	0
2008–09	Avangard Omsk	KHL	15	8	5	13	6	—	—	—	—	—
RSL/KHL totals			107	41	29	70	63	14	5	6	11	0

=== International ===
Year	Team	Event	Result	GP	G	A	Pts	PIM
2006	Russia	IH18	3rd place, bronze medalist(s)	4	1	1	2	4
2007	Russia	WJC	2nd place, silver medalist(s)	6	5	3	8	2
2007	Russia	U18	1st place, gold medalist(s)	7	5	3	8	6
2008	Russia	WJC	3rd place, bronze medalist(s)	6	3	3	6	2
Junior totals				23	14	10	24	14

== Awards and honours ==
=== International ===
Award	Year
IIHF World U18 Championships Top Three Player for Russia	2007
IIHF World U18 Championships Player of the Game	2007 vs. United States
IIHF World U18 Championships Tournament All-Star	2007
IIHF World U20 Championships Top Three Player for Russia	2007
IIHF World U20 Championships Tournament All-Star	2007
IIHF World U20 Championships Best Forward	2007

=== Professional ===
Award	Year
Russian Super League Newcomer of the Year	2006–07

== See also ==
- List of ice hockey players who died during their playing career

Preceded by Bobby Sanguinetti	New York Rangers first-round draft pick 2007	Succeeded by Michael Del Zotto
