= Emil Bejmo =

Swedish professional ice hockey forward

- Born: October 10, 1989 (age 36) Karlstad, Sweden
- Height: 5 ft 11 in (180 cm)
- Weight: 170 lb (77 kg; 12 st 2 lb)
- Position: Forward
- Shoots: Left
- Norway team Former teams: Manglerud Star; Färjestads BK; Stjernen; Mora IK; SønderjyskE; Pionniers
- Playing career: 2006–present

Emil Bejmo (born October 10, 1989) is a Swedish professional ice hockey forward. He is currently playing for Manglerud Star in the Fjordkraftligaen (Norway).

== Playing career ==
During the 2006–07 season, Bejmo played three games with Färjestads BK in the Swedish Hockey League. The rest of the season has he played with the club's U18 team. Bejmo was eligible for the 2008 NHL entry draft, however went undrafted.

On March 21, 2014, having played the tail end of the 2013–14 season on loan from Asplöven HC with Mora IK, his move was made permanent on a three-year contract.
