= Lassi Kokkala =

Finnish ice hockey player

- Born: March 20, 1989 (age 35); Turku, Finland
- Height: 6 ft 2 in (188 cm)
- Weight: 192 lb (87 kg; 13 st 10 lb)
- Position: Centre
- Shot: Left
- Played for: Stavanger Oilers; Vaasan Sport; Ilves; AaB Ishockey; HC TPS; Hokki; TUTO Hockey
- Playing career: 2006–2019

Lassi Kokkala (born March 20, 1989) is a Finnish professional ice hockey player.

Lassi Kokkala made his SM-liiga debut playing with Ilves during the 2006–07 SM-liiga season.

== Career statistics ==
			Regular season					Playoffs
Season	Team	League	GP	G	A	Pts	PIM	GP	G	A	Pts	PIM
2003–04	HC TPS U16	U16 SM-sarja	2	0	0	0	0	—	—	—	—	—
2004–05	HC TPS U16	U16 SM-sarja	20	19	21	40	24	2	0	3	3	0
2004–05	HC TPS U18	U18 SM-sarja	4	1	0	1	0	—	—	—	—	—
2005–06	HC TPS U18	U18 SM-sarja	22	9	10	19	10	—	—	—	—	—
2005–06	HC TPS U20	U20 SM-liiga	15	1	1	2	12	—	—	—	—	—
2006–07	HC TPS U18	U18 SM-sarja	3	0	1	1	0	6	7	4	11	2
2006–07	HC TPS U20	U20 SM-liiga	42	16	21	37	38	5	0	4	4	4
2006–07	HC TPS	SM-liiga	1	0	0	0	0	—	—	—	—	—
2007–08	HC TPS U20	U20 SM-liiga	36	15	13	28	28	—	—	—	—	—
2007–08	HC TPS	SM-liiga	22	0	1	1	0	—	—	—	—	—
2008–09	HC TPS U20	U20 SM-liiga	5	2	7	9	4	12	3	6	9	4
2008–09	HC TPS	SM-liiga	3	1	0	1	0	1	0	0	0	0
2008–09	Hokki	Mestis	24	3	7	10	6	—	—	—	—	—
2008–09	Suomi U20	Mestis	4	1	3	4	4	—	—	—	—	—
2009–10	HC TPS U20	U20 SM-liiga	1	0	0	0	2	—	—	—	—	—
2009–10	HC TPS	SM-liiga	46	2	1	3	10	—	—	—	—	—
2009–10	TUTO Hockey	Mestis	6	1	5	6	6	—	—	—	—	—
2010–11	AaB Ishockey	Denmark	39	8	20	28	16	4	0	1	1	0
2011–12	Vaasan Sport	Mestis	41	7	7	14	24	11	4	6	10	6
2012–13	Ilves	SM-liiga	60	9	4	13	28	—	—	—	—	—
2013–14	Vaasan Sport	Mestis	54	28	29	57	38	7	2	4	6	4
2014–15	Vaasan Sport	Liiga	43	9	11	20	22	—	—	—	—	—
2015–16	Vaasan Sport	Liiga	58	12	17	29	16	2	0	0	0	2
2016–17	Vaasan Sport	Liiga	49	6	12	18	10	—	—	—	—	—
2017–18	Stavanger Oilers	Norway	40	6	9	15	14	5	1	0	1	4
2018–19	TUTO Hockey	Mestis	47	15	18	33	32	10	3	6	9	4
SM-liiga totals			282	39	46	85	86	3	0	0	0	2
Mestis totals			176	55	69	124	110	28	9	16	25	14
