= 2009–10 Alabama–Huntsville Chargers men's ice hockey season =

American college ice hockey team season

2009–10 Alabama–Huntsville Chargers men's ice hockey

CHA tournament champions

NCAA First round, L to Miami (OH), 2–1
- Conference: College Hockey America
- Record: 12–18–3 (6–10–2 CHA)
- Head coach: Danton Cole (3rd season)
- Assistant coaches: Chris Luongo; John McCabe
- Captain: Ryan Burkholder
- Alternate captain: Brennan Barker, Davide Nicoletti, Tom Train
- Home stadium: Von Braun Center

The 2009–10 Alabama–Huntsville Chargers ice hockey team represented the University of Alabama in Huntsville in the 2009–10 NCAA Division I men's ice hockey season. The Chargers were coached by Danton Cole who was in his third season as head coach. His assistant coaches were Chris Luongo and John McCabe. The Chargers played their home games in the Von Braun Center, and were a member of College Hockey America.

The 2009–10 season marked the final season for men's hockey as part of College Hockey America; Niagara University and Robert Morris University moved to Atlantic Hockey, and Bemidji State moved to the WCHA for the 2010–11 season. With the CHA folding, UAH applied for admission to the Central Collegiate Hockey Association (CCHA). On August 11, the CCHA announced that UAH's application to become a member of the conference was denied. Following the 2009–10 season, UAH will play as the only Division I Independent program due to the lack of conference affiliation.

After a 30-game regular season, the Chargers finished with 10 wins, 17 losses, and 3 ties. Highlights came from a road upset of then-fifth ranked Notre Dame in the first game of the season, and a consolation win at the Catamount Cup in January. The team finished third in the CHA, with 6 wins, 10 losses, and 2 ties. At the 2010 CHA men's ice hockey tournament in Lewiston, New York, the Chargers defeated Robert Morris in the first round, and then defeated Niagara, 3–2, in overtime to win the conference title and secure a trip to the NCAA Tournament. In the NCAA Northwest Regional, the Chargers lost to No. 1 ranked Miami (OH), 2–1.

== Roster ==
No.	Nat.	Player	Class	Pos	Height	Weight	DoB	Hometown	Previous team
2		Ryan Burkholder (C)	Junior	D	6' 1" (1.85 m)	195 lb (88 kg)	1987-09-01	Newmarket, Ontario	Newmarket (OJHL)
4		Brandon Roshko	Senior	D	5' 9" (1.75 m)	180 lb (82 kg)	1985-08-22	Hamilton, Ontario	Aurora (OJHL)
5		Brennan Barker (A)	Senior	D	6' 1" (1.85 m)	195 lb (88 kg)	1985-07-19	Long Sault, Ontario	Penticton (BCHL)
7		Jamie Easton	Sophomore	F	5' 8" (1.73 m)	165 lb (75 kg)	1988-01-05	Edmonton, Alberta	Bonnyville (AJHL)
8		Clark MacLean	Sophomore	F	6' 1" (1.85 m)	175 lb (79 kg)	1987-12-04	Worthington, Ohio	Ohio (USHL)
9		Cody Campbell	Sophomore	F	5' 9" (1.75 m)	180 lb (82 kg)	1987-05-21	Maple Ridge, British Columbia	Burnaby (BCHL)
10		Andrew Coburn	Junior	F	5' 10" (1.78 m)	185 lb (84 kg)	1986-02-15	Mount Forest, Ontario	Vernon (OJHL)
11		Neil Ruffini	Junior	F	5' 10" (1.78 m)	195 lb (88 kg)	1988-03-14	Roswell, Georgia	Proctor Academy (USHS–NH)
13		Joey Koudys	Junior	F	5' 11" (1.8 m)	185 lb (84 kg)	1988-03-28	Grimsby, Ontario	Thorold (GOJHL)
14		Cale Tanaka	Senior	F	5' 9" (1.75 m)	180 lb (82 kg)	1986-05-31	Stouffville, Ontario	Aurora (OJHL)
15		Matt Baxter	Junior	D	6' 3" (1.91 m)	180 lb (82 kg)	1988-08-04	Courtice, Ontario	Bowmanville (OJHL)
16		Tom Train (A)	Senior	F	6' 1" (1.85 m)	190 lb (86 kg)	1985-02-22	Hurst, Texas	Texas (NAHL)
18		Matti Järvinen	Freshman	F	6' 4" (1.93 m)	201 lb (91 kg)	1989-10-14	Espoo, Finland	Espoo (Jr. A SM-liiga)
19		Chris Fairbanks	Junior	F	6' 1" (1.85 m)	180 lb (82 kg)	1986-07-15	Milford, Michigan	Youngstown (NAHL)
21		Keenan Desmet	Freshman	F	5' 11" (1.8 m)	183 lb (83 kg)	1988-07-07	Strathmore, Alberta	Salmon Arm (BCHL)
22		Sebastian Geoffrion	Freshman	F	5' 10" (1.78 m)	190 lb (86 kg)	1989-07-26	Brentwood, Tennessee	Indiana (USHL)
23		Curtis deBruyn	Freshman	D	5' 10" (1.78 m)	186 lb (84 kg)	1988-10-07	Calgary, Alberta	Olds (AJHL)
24		Tom Durnie	Sophomore	D	6' 2" (1.88 m)	195 lb (88 kg)	1988-04-04	Calgary, Alberta	Canmore (AJHL)
25		Kevin Morrison	Senior	F	6' 1" (1.85 m)	190 lb (86 kg)	1986-04-30	Mississauga, Ontario	Milton (OJHL)
26		Justin Cseter	Freshman	F	5' 10" (1.78 m)	173 lb (78 kg)	1988-08-24	Menomonie, Wisconsin	Salmon Arm (BCHL)
27		Vince Bruni	Junior	F	6' 1" (1.85 m)	190 lb (86 kg)	1987-04-08	Toronto, Ontario	Springfield (NAHL)
28		Davide Nicoletti (A)	Senior	D	6' 3" (1.91 m)	210 lb (95 kg)	1986-03-22	Toronto, Ontario	Springfield (NAHL)
29		Blake MacNicol	Senior	G	5' 10" (1.78 m)	175 lb (79 kg)	1986-12-31	Milan, Ohio	Bay State (EJHL)
31		John Griggs	Freshman	G	6' 1" (1.85 m)	175 lb (79 kg)	1988-06-28	Barrington, Illinois	Cumberland (CJHL)
33		Cameron Talbot	Junior	G	6' 3" (1.91 m)	185 lb (84 kg)	1987-06-05	Caledonia, Ontario	Hamilton (OJHL)

== Season ==
=== Schedule ===
- Green background indicates win (2 points).
- Red background indicates loss (0 points).
- Yellow background indicates tie (1 point).

Date	Time	Opponent	Site	Decision	Result	Attendance	Record
Regular season
October 9	6:35 pm	at #5 Notre Dame*	Edmund P. Joyce Center • South Bend, Indiana	Talbot	W 3–2	2,994	1–0–0
October 10	6:05 pm	at #5 Notre Dame*	Edmund P. Joyce Center • South Bend, Indiana	Talbot	L 1–3	2,715	1–1–0
October 16	8:05 pm	at Air Force*	Cadet Ice Arena • Colorado Springs, Colorado	Talbot	W 4–2	3,067	2–1–0
October 17	8:05 pm	at Air Force*	Cadet Ice Arena • Colorado Springs, Colorado	Talbot	W 4–2	2,534	3–1–0
October 23	7:05 pm	Western Michigan*	Von Braun Center • Huntsville, Alabama	Talbot	L 1–2	3,873	3–2–0
October 24	7:05 pm	Western Michigan*	Von Braun Center • Huntsville, Alabama	Talbot	L 1–2	1,826	3–3–0
October 31	7:05 pm	#14 Bemidji State	Von Braun Center • Huntsville, Alabama	Talbot	L 1–2 ^{OT}	1,446	3–4–0 (0–1–0)
November 1	1:05 pm	#14 Bemidji State	Von Braun Center • Huntsville, Alabama	Talbot	L 1–2 ^{OT}	1,186	3–5–0 (0–2–0)
November 13	7:05 pm	#5 UMass Lowell*	Von Braun Center • Huntsville, Alabama	Talbot	L 1–3	2,406	3–6–0 (0–2–0)
November 14	7:05 pm	#5 UMass Lowell*	Von Braun Center • Huntsville, Alabama	Talbot	L 0–4	1,992	3–7–0 (0–2–0)
November 20	7:35 pm	at #8 Bemidji State	John S. Glas Field House • Bemidji, Minnesota	Talbot	L 1–6	2,108	3–8–0 (0–3–0)
November 21	7:00 pm	at #8 Bemidji State	John S. Glas Field House • Bemidji, Minnesota	Talbot	L 3–6	2,298	3–9–0 (0–4–0)
December 4	6:05 pm	at Robert Morris	84 Lumber Arena • Neville Island, Pennsylvania	Talbot	T 2–2 ^{OT}	678	3–9–1 (0–4–1)
December 5	6:05 pm	at Robert Morris	84 Lumber Arena • Neville Island, Pennsylvania	Talbot	W 4–2	467	4–9–1 (1–4–1)
January 2	6:00 pm	at Vermont*	Gutterson Fieldhouse • Burlington, Vermont (Catamount Cup Semifinal)	Talbot	L 3–4	4,003	4–10–1 (1–4–1)
January 3	3:00 pm	vs. Mercyhurst*	Gutterson Fieldhouse • Burlington, Vermont (Catamount Cup Consolation)	Talbot	W 4–1	N/A	5–10–1 (1–4–1)
January 8	6:00 pm	at Clarkson*	Cheel Arena • Potsdam, New York	Talbot	L 1–3	2,389	5–11–1 (1–4–1)
January 9	6:00 pm	at Clarkson*	Cheel Arena • Potsdam, New York	Talbot	T 3–3 ^{OT}	2,329	5–11–2 (1–4–1)
January 15	6:05 pm	at Robert Morris	84 Lumber Arena • Neville Island, Pennsylvania	Talbot	L 2–3	1,035	5–12–2 (1–5–1)
January 16	6:05 pm	at Robert Morris	84 Lumber Arena • Neville Island, Pennsylvania	Talbot	L 2–4	682	5–13–2 (1–6–1)
January 29	5:35 pm	Niagara	Von Braun Center • Huntsville, Alabama	Talbot	W 3–2	1,086	6–13–2 (2–6–1)
January 30	3:05 pm	Niagara	Von Braun Center • Huntsville, Alabama	Talbot	W 3–2	1,528	7–13–2 (3–6–1)
February 12	6:00 pm	at Niagara	Dwyer Arena • Lewiston, New York	Talbot	W 3–2	1,314	8–13–2 (4–6–1)
February 13^{†}	3:00 pm	at Niagara	Dwyer Arena • Lewiston, New York				8–13–2 (4–6–1)
February 20	3:05 pm	Robert Morris	Von Braun Center • Huntsville, Alabama	Talbot	W 4–3	1,277	9–13–2 (5–6–1)
February 21	1:05 pm	Robert Morris	Von Braun Center • Huntsville, Alabama	Talbot	L 2–4	957	9–14–2 (5–7–1)
February 26	6:00 pm	at Niagara	Dwyer Arena • Lewiston, New York	Talbot	L 3–4	1,169	9–15–2 (5–8–1)
February 27	6:00 pm	at Niagara	Dwyer Arena • Lewiston, New York	Talbot	L 1–3	1,088	9–16–2 (5–9–1)
February 28^{†}	3:00 pm	at Niagara	Dwyer Arena • Lewiston, New York	Talbot	W 3–2 ^{OT}	956	10–16–2 (6–9–1)
March 5	7:05 pm	Bemidji State	Von Braun Center • Huntsville, Alabama	Talbot	L 2–3	3,287	10–17–2 (6–10–1)
March 6	7:05 pm	Bemidji State	Von Braun Center • Huntsville, Alabama	Talbot	T 2–2 ^{OT}	1,527	10–17–3 (6–10–2)
CHA Tournament
March 12	2:00 pm	vs. Robert Morris*	Dwyer Arena • Lewiston, New York (CHA Tournament Semifinal)	Talbot	W 1–0	380	11–17–3 (6–10–2)
March 13	7:00 pm	at Niagara*	Dwyer Arena • Lewiston, New York (CHA Tournament Final)	Talbot	W 3–2 ^{OT}	1,818	12–17–3 (6–10–2)
NCAA Tournament
March 27	3:00 pm	vs. #1 Miami (OH)*	Allen County War Memorial Coliseum • Fort Wayne, Indiana (NCAA Midwest Regional semifinal)	Talbot	L 1–2	4,133	12–18–3 (6–10–2)
*Non-conference game. All times are in Central Time.^{†}February 13 game at Niagara postponed until February 28 due to shooting on UAH campus.

=== Standings ===
2009–10 College Hockey America standings
	Conference							Overall					
	GP	W	L	T	PTS	GF	GA	GP	W	L	T	GF	GA
#12 Bemidji State†	18	14	3	1	29	71	40	37	23	10	4	128	87
Robert Morris	18	6	9	3	15	47	60	35	10	19	6	94	121
Alabama–Huntsville*	18	6	10	2	14	42	54	33	12	18	3	73	89
Niagara	18	6	10	2	14	53	59	36	12	20	4	107	118
Championship: Alabama–Huntsville † indicates conference regular season champion * indicates conference tournament champion Final rankings: USA Today/USA Hockey Magazine Top 15 Poll

=== Statistics ===
==== Skaters ====
Regular season

Player	GP	G	A	Pts	PIM
Andrew Coburn	30	7	14	21	14
Cody Campbell	30	7	13	20	2
Matti Järvinen	27	5	12	17	14
Neil Ruffini	30	8	4	12	35
Justin Cseter	30	5	7	12	12
Kevin Morrison	24	6	5	11	16
Tom Train	24	5	6	11	20
Davide Nicoletti	28	3	8	11	12
Keenan Desmet	30	3	8	11	39
Brandon Roshko	30	2	9	11	30
Chris Fairbanks	27	6	2	8	12
Brennan Barker	25	1	7	8	34
Jamie Easton	17	2	4	6	8
Curtis deBruyn	29	1	5	6	14
Cale Tanaka	28	3	2	5	20
Matt Baxter	26	0	4	4	10
Vince Bruni	26	1	2	3	26
Cameron Talbot	30	0	3	3	0
Sebasian Geoffrion	20	2	0	2	14
Tom Durnie	16	1	1	2	6
Joey Koudys	13	0	2	2	6
Ryan Burkholder	30	0	1	1	26
Blake MacNicol	2	0	0	0	0
Team	30	68	117	185	378

Postseason

Player	GP	G	A	Pts	PIM
Brennan Barker	3	2	1	3	6
Keenan Desmet	3	1	2	3	2
Neil Ruffini	3	1	1	2	2
Cody Campbell	3	1	1	2	4
Curtis deBruyn	3	0	1	1	0
Brandon Roshko	3	0	1	1	0
Justin Cseter	3	0	1	1	2
Andrew Coburn	3	0	1	1	6
Matti Järvinen	3	0	1	1	6
Vince Bruni	3	0	0	0	0
Chris Fairbanks	3	0	0	0	0
Davide Nicoletti	3	0	0	0	0
Cameron Talbot	3	0	0	0	0
Cale Tanaka	3	0	0	0	0
Kevin Morrison	3	0	0	0	2
Tom Train	3	0	0	0	2
Sebasian Geoffrion	3	0	0	0	4
Matt Baxter	3	0	0	0	6
Ryan Burkholder	3	0	0	0	6
Team	3	5	10	15	48

==== Goaltenders ====
Regular season

Player	GP	TOI	W	L	T	GA	GAA	SA	SV	SV%	SO
Cameron Talbot	30	1780:28	10	17	3	81	2.73	1015	934	.920	0
Blake MacNicol	2	37:12	0	0	0	4	6.45	14	10	.714	0

Postseason

Player	GP	TOI	W	L	T	GA	GAA	SA	SV	SV%	SO
Cameron Talbot	3	181:09	2	1	0	4	1.32	112	108	.964	1

=== Awards ===
- 2010 College Hockey America Champions
- 2010 CHA Tournament MVP: Cameron Talbot
- 2010 CHA All-Tournament Team: Cody Campbell, Cameron Talbot
