= Fedin =

Fedin (Russian: Федин) is a Russian masculine surname, its feminine counterpart is Fedina. It may refer to

- Andrei Fedin (born 1970), Russian football player
- Ilya Fedin (born 1989), Russian ice hockey winger
- Konstantin Fedin (1892–1977), Russian novelist
- Maxim Fedin (born 1996), Kazakh football midfielder
- Sergei Fedin (born 1981), Russian football player
- Vasily Fedin (1926–2005), Soviet cyclist
- Fyodor Fedin (1919–1944), Soviet non-commissioned officer and Hero of the Soviet Union
