= 2010 CHA men's ice hockey tournament =

2010 CHA Men's ice hockey tournament
- Dates: March 12–13, 2010
- Teams: 4
- Finals site: Dwyer Arena; Lewiston, New York
- Champions: Alabama–Huntsville (2nd title)
- Winning coach: Danton Cole (1st title)
- MVP: Cameron Talbot (Alabama–Huntsville)
- CHA Men's Ice Hockey Tournaments

The 2010 CHA Men's Ice Hockey Tournament was the 11th tournament in conference history and was played between March 12 and March 13, 2010 at Dwyer Arena in Lewiston, New York. The winner received College Hockey America's automatic bid to the 2010 NCAA Division I Men's Ice Hockey Tournament. Alabama–Huntsville defeated hosts Niagara, 3–2, in overtime to win their second CHA Tournament title.

2010 marked the final men's tournament for the CHA, as the conference would disband its men's division after the season.

== Format ==
The tournament featured two rounds of play. In the first round, the first and fourth seeds and second and third seeds each played for a berth in the championship game. The winners of the championship, played on March 13, 2010, received an automatic bid to the 2010 NCAA Division I Men's Ice Hockey Tournament.

=== Conference standings ===
Note: GP = Games played; W = Wins; L = Losses; T = Ties; PTS = Points; GF = Goals For; GA = Goals Against

2009–10 College Hockey America standings
	Conference							Overall					
	GP	W	L	T	PTS	GF	GA	GP	W	L	T	GF	GA
#12 Bemidji State†	18	14	3	1	29	71	40	37	23	10	4	128	87
Robert Morris	18	6	9	3	15	47	60	35	10	19	6	94	121
Alabama–Huntsville*	18	6	10	2	14	42	54	33	12	18	3	73	89
Niagara	18	6	10	2	14	53	59	36	12	20	4	107	118
Championship: Alabama–Huntsville † indicates conference regular season champion * indicates conference tournament champion Final rankings: USA Today/USA Hockey Magazine Top 15 Poll

== Bracket ==
Semifinals; March 12
1	Bemidji State	4
4	Niagara	5
3	Robert Morris	0
2	Alabama–Huntsville	1

Championship; March 13
4	Niagara	2
3	Alabama–Huntsville	3*
Third place
1	Bemidji State	3
2	Robert Morris	3

Note: * denotes overtime period(s)

All times are local (EST).

=== Semifinals ===
March 12, 2010; 3:00 PM	(2) Robert Morris	0 – 1 (0–0, 0–1, 0–0)	(3) Alabama–Huntsville	Dwyer Arena, Lewiston, New York; Attendance: 380

Game reference
Brooks Ostergard	Goalies	Cameron Talbot	Referees: Mike Baker; Chris Foote
0 – 1 / 37:57 - Ruffini (Barker, Desmet) (PP)			Referees: Mike Baker; Chris Foote
22 min	Penalties	14 min	Referees: Mike Baker; Chris Foote
29	Shots	24	Referees: Mike Baker; Chris Foote

March 12, 2010; 7:00 PM	(1) Bemidji State	4 – 5 (1–2, 1–2, 2–1)	(4) Niagara	Dwyer Arena, Lewiston, New York; Attendance: 1,003

Game reference

Dan Bakala
Goalies
Chris Noonan
Referees:
Kevin Langseth
John Philo

	0 – 1	4:29 - Gotto (Ross)
Peluso (Lehrke, McKelvie) - 5:12	1 – 1
	1 – 2	19:27 - Olidis (Moran, Chartrain)
Cramer (Walters) - 31:31	2 – 2
	2 – 3	35:46 - Gotto (Matthews, Haczyk) (PP)
	2 – 4	38:34 - Haczyk (Zanette) (SH)
Walters - 50:25	3 – 4
	3 – 5	51:40 - Mironov (Olidis, Moran)
Cramer (Hunt) - 52:45	4 – 5

8 min
Penalties
14 min
36
Shots
25

=== Third place ===
March 13, 2010; 4:00 PM	(1) Bemidji State	3 – 3 (OT) (1–0, 0–0, 2–3, 0–0)	(2) Robert Morris	Dwyer Arena, Lewiston, New York; Attendance: 425

Game reference

Dan Bakala (out 45:49)
Mathieu Dugas (in 45:49)
Goalies
Eric Levine
Referees:
Mike Baker
Chris Foote

Cramer (Peluso, Lehrke) (PP) - 12:49	1 – 0
	1 – 1	43:43 - Velasquez (Lyle, Cramer)
	1 – 2	44:31 - Blandina (Cramer)
	1 – 3	45:49 - Longpre (Meadows, Salituro)
Kinne (MacQueen) - 54:03	2 – 3
Lowe (Hunt, George) - 54:56	3 – 3

16 min
Penalties
14 min
36
Shots
32

=== Championship ===
March 13, 2010; 8:00 PM	(4) Niagara	2 – 3 (OT) (0–0, 1–2, 1–0, 0–1)	(3) Alabama–Huntsville	Dwyer Arena, Lewiston, New York; Attendance: 1,818

Game reference

Chris Noonan
Goalies
Cameron Talbot
Referees:
Kevin Langseth
John Philo

	0 – 1	27:33 - Barker (Roshko, Campbell) (PP)
Moran (Olidis) - 27:53	1 – 1
	1 – 2	36:31 - Campbell (Coburn, Järvinen) (PP)
Zanette (Haczyk, Weiss) - 44:00	2 – 2
	2 – 3	61:34 - Desmet (Ruffini, deBruyn) (PP)

14 min
Penalties
14 min
45
Shots
24

== Tournament awards ==
=== All-Tournament Team ===
- Goaltender: Cameron Talbot (Alabama–Huntsville)
- Defensemen: Tyler Gotto (Niagara)
- Forwards: Cody Campbell (UAH), Ron Cramer (Robert Morris), Ryan Cramer (Bemidji St.), Chris Moran (Niagara)

=== MVP ===
- Cameron Talbot (Alabama–Huntsville)
