= Kyle Turris =

Canadian ice hockey player (born 1989)

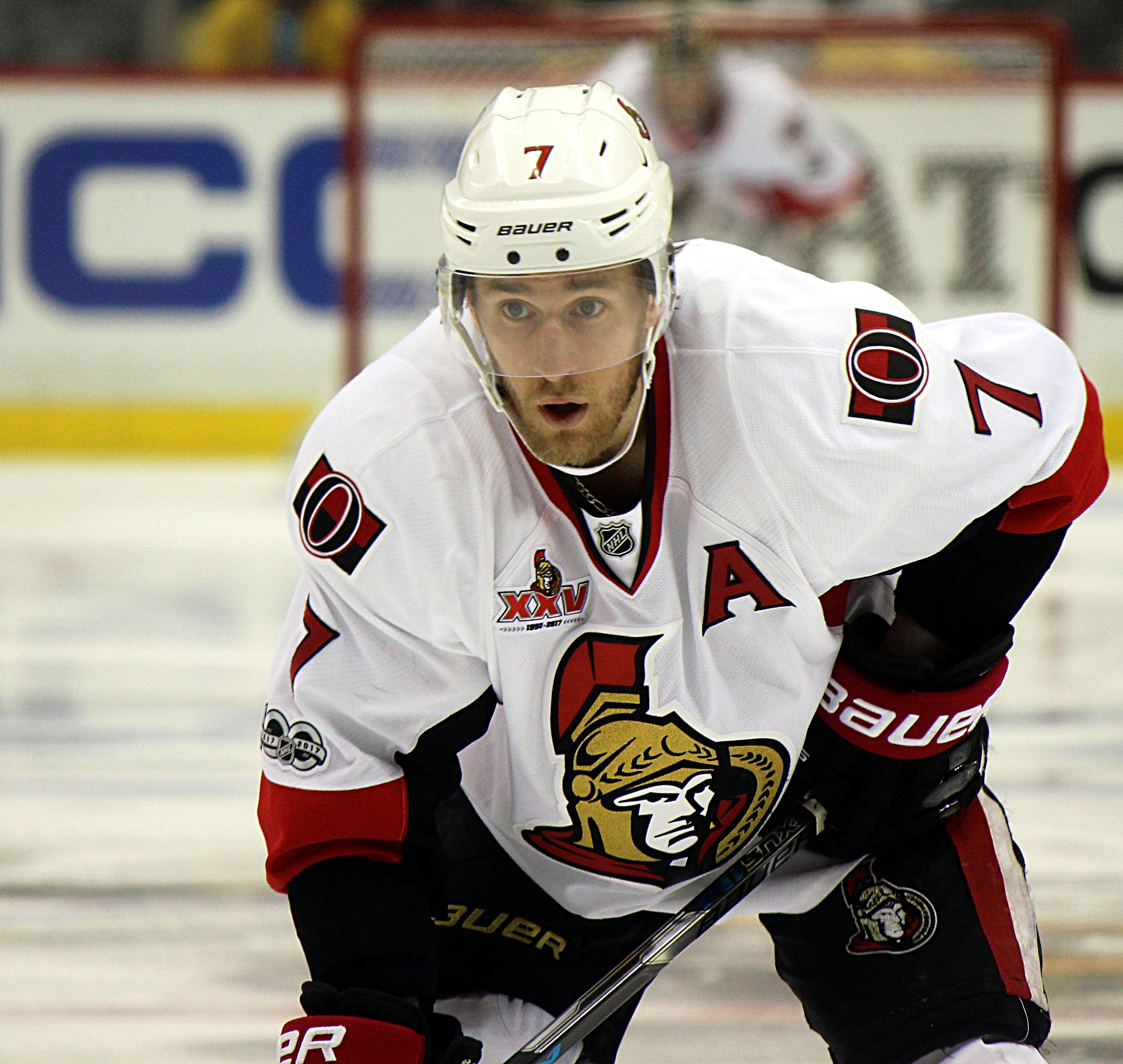
- Turris with the Ottawa Senators during the 2017 Stanley Cup playoffs
- Born: August 14, 1989 (age 36) New Westminster, British Columbia, Canada
- Height: 6 ft 1 in (185 cm)
- Weight: 195 lb (88 kg; 13 st 13 lb)
- Position: Centre
- Shot: Right
- Played for: Phoenix Coyotes; Ottawa Senators; Oulun Kärpät; Nashville Predators; Edmonton Oilers
- National team: Canada
- NHL draft: 3rd overall, 2007; Phoenix Coyotes
- Playing career: 2008–2022

Kyle Turris (born August 14, 1989) is a Canadian former professional ice hockey centre. He was selected third overall in the 2007 NHL entry draft by the Phoenix Coyotes. He has also played with the Ottawa Senators, Oulun Kärpät, Nashville Predators and Edmonton Oilers.

== Playing career ==
=== Early career ===
As a youth, Turris played in the 2002 Quebec International Pee-Wee Hockey Tournament with a minor ice hockey team from North Vancouver.

As a 16-year-old in the British Columbia Hockey League (BCHL), Turris scored 72 points in 57 games for the Burnaby Express in 2005–06 and was awarded the Bruce Allison Memorial Trophy for the Coastal Conference as rookie of the year. The following year, he finished second in BCHL scoring with 121 points and was named the Coastal Conference's Most Valuable Player. Adding 26 points in 14 games, Turris led the Express to the BCHL championship, advancing to the 2006 Royal Bank Cup, Canada's national Junior A championship. He scored a hat-trick in the final game against the Yorkton Terriers of the Saskatchewan Junior Hockey League (SJHL) and led the tournament in scoring as the Express won the championship.

Named the 2007 Canadian Junior A Player of the Year, he was ranked first overall among North American skaters by Central Scouting and third among all skaters by International Scouting Services for the upcoming draft. In the subsequent 2007 NHL entry draft, he was drafted third overall by the Phoenix Coyotes, behind Patrick Kane and James van Riemsdyk. Turris stands as the highest ever drafted Tier II Junior "A" player since the level's inception by the Canadian Amateur Hockey Association in 1970.

Turris had the option of playing major junior rather than Junior A, as his Western Hockey League (WHL) rights were held by the Vancouver Giants, but he opted to stay with the Express so that he could play collegiate hockey in the U.S. once eligible. Accordingly, Turris joined the Wisconsin Badgers of the NCAA's Western Collegiate Hockey Association in 2007–08 and recorded a team-high 35 points in 36 games. While at the University of Wisconsin, Turris' roommate was Ryan McDonagh, who went on to play with the New York Rangers.

=== Professional career ===
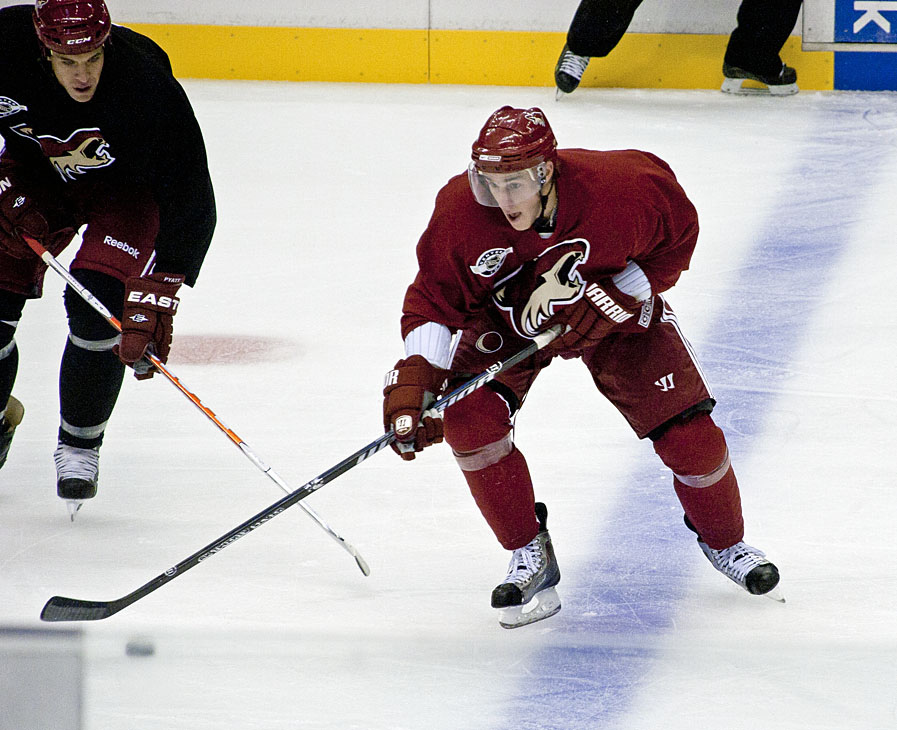
Turris and teammate Taylor Pyatt (left) practicing with the Phoenix Coyotes

==== Phoenix Coyotes ====
After Turris's season in Wisconsin ended, he signed an entry-level contract with the Phoenix Coyotes on March 31, 2008, and joined the team for their final three games of the season. He made his NHL debut on April 3 against the Dallas Stars and recorded his first point, an assist, in his third game on April 6 against the Anaheim Ducks.

Starting 2008–09 with the Coyotes the following season, Turris scored his first NHL goal on October 12, 2008, digging a rebound out from under goaltender Jean-Sébastien Giguère's pad in a 4–2 win against the Anaheim Ducks.

After becoming a restricted free agent on July 1, 2011, failed contract negotiations with the Coyotes resulted in Turris holding out for the start of the 2011–12 season. With Turris absent from Phoenix's training camp, ESPN reported in September 2011 that Turris had requested a US$3–4 million salary. His demands caused speculation in the media he wanted to be traded from the team. By late October, a month into the season, Turris' agent, Kurt Overhardt, confirmed the player had requested a trade, asserting contract negotiations had "never been about money". Turris agreed to a two-year, $2.8 million contract with the Coyotes on November 22, 2011.

==== Ottawa Senators ====
On December 17, 2011, Turris was traded to the Ottawa Senators in exchange for David Rundblad and a second-round pick in the 2012 NHL entry draft. He registered an assist in his first game with Ottawa, a 4–1 victory over the Buffalo Sabres on December 20, 2011. On April 18, 2012, Turris scored two minutes into the first overtime period, earning the Senators a come-from-behind 3–2 victory over the New York Rangers, as well as their first home playoff win since Game 3 of the 2007 Stanley Cup Finals against the Anaheim Ducks. After establishing new career highs in goals (12), assists (17) and points (29) in his first season in Ottawa, Turris agreed to a five-year, $17.5 million contract extension with the club in late August 2012. From 2012 to 2016, Turris had at least one point during each of the team's season-opening games. Turris finished the 2016–17 season with a career-high 27 goals. The Senators advanced to the Eastern Conference Finals during the 2017 playoffs, but were eliminated in seven games by the eventual Stanley Cup champions, the Pittsburgh Penguins. In 19 playoff games that year, Turris recorded 4 goals and 10 points.

==== Nashville Predators ====
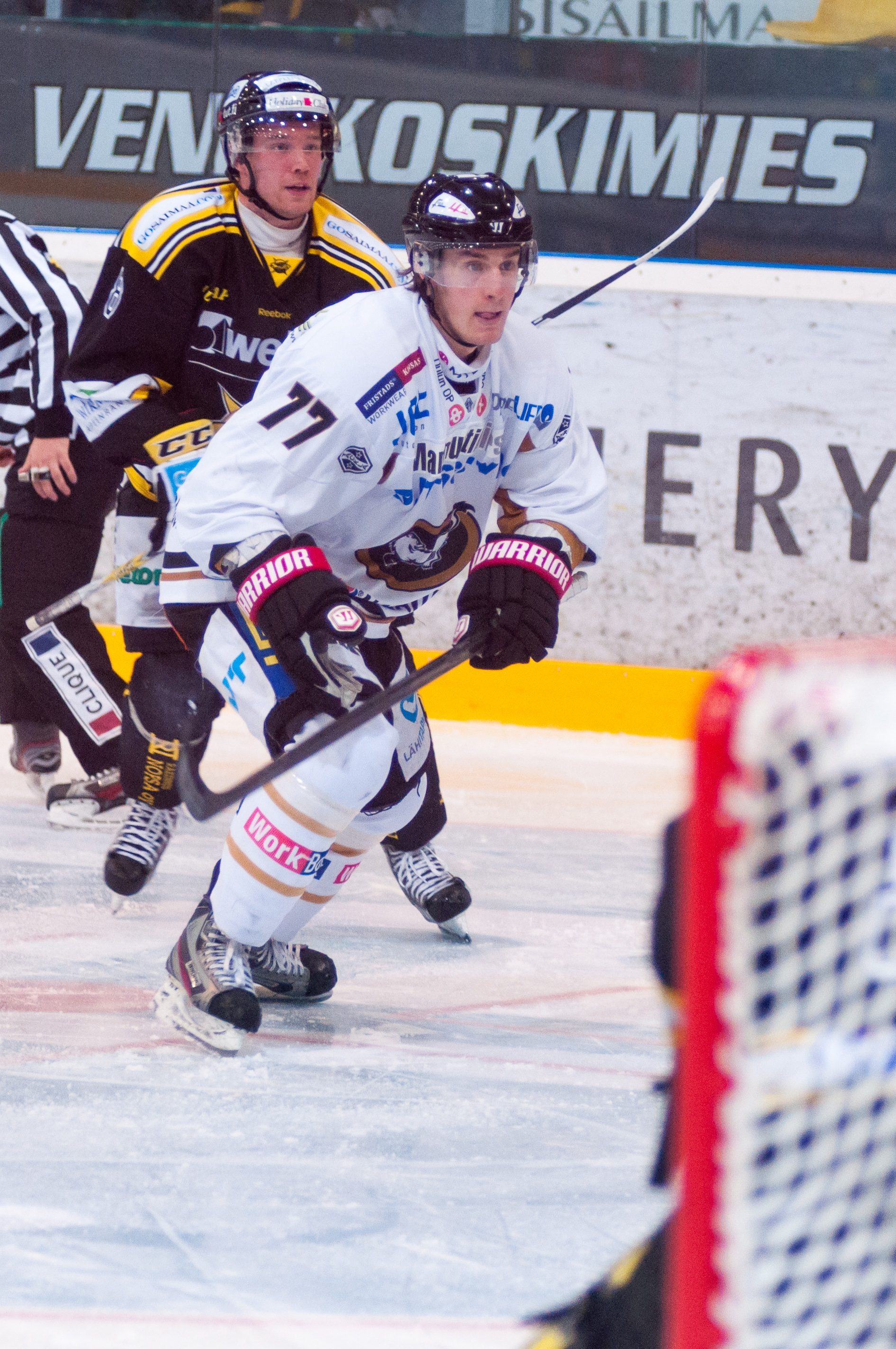
Turris played with Oulun Kärpät during the 2012–13 NHL lockout

Entering the 2017–18 NHL season, Turris and the Senators had not reached agreement on a new contract. On November 5, 2017, Turris was traded to the Nashville Predators in a three-team trade that also included the Colorado Avalanche. The Senators acquired Matt Duchene from the Avalanche, while Colorado acquired Samuel Girard, Vladislav Kamenev and a 2018 second-round pick from the Predators, as well as Andrew Hammond, Shane Bowers and 2018 first- and third-round picks from the Senators. Turris was immediately signed to a six-year, $36 million contract extension. In his Predators' debut, he scored and recorded an assist in a 5–4 win over the Pittsburgh Penguins.

On October 7, 2020, Turris was placed on unconditional waivers for the purpose of a buyout by the Predators. The following day, Turris cleared waivers, making him a free agent for the first time in his career. Turris had four years remaining on his contract that carried an annual cap hit of $6 million. His buyout would save the Predators $4 million in cap space in each of the next four seasons, but add a cap charge of $2 million in each of the following four years.

==== Edmonton Oilers ====
On October 9, 2020, Turris signed a two-year, $3.3 million contract with the Edmonton Oilers.

==== Retirement ====
On August 17, 2022, it was announced Turris had been hired by the Coquitlam Express as special advisor to the general manager and as a player development coach, marking an end to his playing career.

== International play ==
Medal record

Ice hockey

Representing Canada

World Championships
Silver medal – second place	2019 Slovakia	

World Junior Championships
Gold medal – first place	2008 Czech Republic	

In the 2005 World U-17 Hockey Challenge, Turris earned a silver medal playing for Canada Pacific. The following year, he received gold with Team Canada at the 2006 Ivan Hlinka Memorial Tournament

Early in his second season in the BCHL, Turris competed in the inaugural 2006 World Junior A Challenge, an international Junior A tournament. Playing with Canada West, he led the tournament in scoring and was named tournament MVP as Canada West won the gold medal over Canada East. At the end of the 2006–07 season, he competed in the 2007 IIHF World U18 Championships with Canada, although the nation failed to medal.

Several months later, Turris played in the 2007 Super Series, an eight-game challenge series between Russia and Canada's national under-20 teams. He led the series in goal scoring with seven as Canada won the series with a 7–0–1 record. In the eighth and final game, held in his hometown of Vancouver, Turris scored two goals and was named the game's MVP.

In 2008, Turris led Canada in scoring at the World Junior Championships in the Czech Republic en route to a gold medal.

On May 12, 2018, Turris was named to represent the senior Canadian team at the IIHF World Championship in Denmark, finishing out of medal contention.

On April 29, 2019, Turris returned to represent Canada in the following 2019 IIHF World Championship held in Slovakia. He was selected as team captain heading into the commencement of the Tournament on May 10, 2019. Turris led Canada's progression through to the playoff rounds before losing the final to Finland to finish with the Silver Medal on May 26, 2019. He finished the tournament posting 4 goals and 10 points in as many games.

== Personal life ==
Turris was born to Bruce and Vikky Turris in New Westminster, British Columbia. Bruce Turris is a retired lacrosse player, inducted into the Canadian Lacrosse Hall of Fame as a former member of the Western Lacrosse Association's Vancouver Burrards.

Turris graduated high school from St. Thomas More Collegiate in Burnaby, British Columbia. Growing up, he excelled in numerous sports. He was a member of the junior New Westminster Salmonbellies lacrosse team and also played the position of quarterback for three years before focusing on hockey full-time.

Turris lists Steve Yzerman as his favourite hockey player growing up, and Jack Johnson and Kings of Leon as his favourite music.

Turris served as honorary captain of the Capital City Condors, a family of ice hockey teams based in Ottawa for those ages six and up who are unable to play on any other hockey team due to a developmental disability. He and his wife, Julie, volunteered with the team on a regular basis and had lent their support to many of the Condors events, including the annual Kyle Turris Capital City Condors Golf Classic.

Turris and his wife Julie have three children: two sons and a daughter.

== Career statistics ==
=== Regular season and playoffs ===
			Regular season					Playoffs
Season	Team	League	GP	G	A	Pts	PIM	GP	G	A	Pts	PIM
2005–06	Burnaby Express	BCHL	57	36	36	72	32	20	10	13	23	6
2006–07	Burnaby Express	BCHL	53	66	55	121	83	14	12	14	26	16
2007–08	Wisconsin Badgers	WCHA	36	11	24	35	38	—	—	—	—	—
2007–08	Phoenix Coyotes	NHL	3	0	1	1	2	—	—	—	—	—
2008–09	Phoenix Coyotes	NHL	63	8	12	20	21	—	—	—	—	—
2008–09	San Antonio Rampage	AHL	8	4	3	7	6	—	—	—	—	—
2009–10	San Antonio Rampage	AHL	76	24	39	63	60	—	—	—	—	—
2010–11	San Antonio Rampage	AHL	2	0	1	1	2	—	—	—	—	—
2010–11	Phoenix Coyotes	NHL	65	11	14	25	16	4	1	2	3	2
2011–12	Phoenix Coyotes	NHL	6	0	0	0	4	—	—	—	—	—
2011–12	Ottawa Senators	NHL	49	12	17	29	27	7	1	2	3	2
2012–13	Oulun Kärpät	SM-l	21	7	12	19	24	—	—	—	—	—
2012–13	Ottawa Senators	NHL	48	12	17	29	24	10	6	3	9	13
2013–14	Ottawa Senators	NHL	82	26	32	58	39	—	—	—	—	—
2014–15	Ottawa Senators	NHL	82	24	40	64	36	6	1	1	2	18
2015–16	Ottawa Senators	NHL	57	13	17	30	32	—	—	—	—	—
2016–17	Ottawa Senators	NHL	78	27	28	55	47	19	4	6	10	25
2017–18	Ottawa Senators	NHL	11	3	6	9	2	—	—	—	—	—
2017–18	Nashville Predators	NHL	65	13	29	42	24	13	0	3	3	6
2018–19	Nashville Predators	NHL	55	7	16	23	33	6	1	1	2	2
2019–20	Nashville Predators	NHL	62	9	22	31	22	4	0	0	0	0
2020–21	Edmonton Oilers	NHL	27	2	3	5	10	—	—	—	—	—
2021–22	Edmonton Oilers	NHL	23	1	3	4	4	—	—	—	—	—
NHL totals			776	168	257	424	343	69	14	18	32	68

=== International ===
Year	Team	Event	GP	G	A	Pts	PIM
2005	Team Pacific	U17	6	3	1	4	2
2006	Canada	IH18	4	1	1	2	2
2006	Canada West	WJAC	4	5	6	11	4
2007	Canada	U18	6	3	2	5	2
2007	Canada	SS	8	7	1	8	6
2008	Canada	WJC	7	4	4	8	2
2014	Canada	WC	8	3	3	6	2
2018	Canada	WC	4	1	1	2	0
2019	Canada	WC	10	4	6	10	8
Junior totals			35	23	15	38	18
Senior totals			22	8	10	18	10

== Awards and honours ==
Award	Year	Ref
BCHL
Coastal Rookie of the Year	2006	
Coastal MVP	2007	
Player of the Year	2007	
RBC Financial Group Canadian Junior A Player of the Year	2007	
CJHL Players of the Year	2007	
College
WCHA All-Rookie Team	2008	
WHCA Third All-Star Team	2008	
International
WJAC MVP	2006	
WJAC All-Star Team	2006	
WJAC Scoring Champion	2006	

Awards and achievements
Preceded by Chris Summers	Phoenix Coyotes first-round draft pick 2007	Succeeded by Nick Ross
