= Yakov Seleznev =

Russian ice hockey player

- Born: 4 August 1989 (age 35); Yelabuga, Soviet Union
- Height: 6 ft 3 in (191 cm)
- Weight: 216 lb (98 kg; 15 st 6 lb)
- Position: Defence
- Shoots: Left
- VHL team Former teams: Beibarys Atyrau; Ak Bars Kazan; Amur Khabarovsk; Neftekhimik Nizhnekamsk; Spartak Moscow; HC Vityaz; HC Yugra; Saryarka Karagandy
- NHL draft: Undrafted
- Playing career: 2007–present

Medal record

Men's ice hockey

Representing Russia

IIHF World U20 Championship
Bronze medal – third place	2008 Czech Republic	

IIHF World U18 Championship
Gold medal – first place	2007 Finland	

World Junior A Challenge
Bronze medal – third place	2006 Yorkton	

Yakov Andreyevich Seleznev (Russian: Яков Андреевич Селезнёв; born 4 August 1989) is a Russian professional ice hockey defenceman who currently plays for Beibarys Atyrau of the Supreme Hockey League (VHL). He previously played in the Saryarka Karaganda, Kontinental Hockey League (KHL) for Ak Bars Kazan, Amur Khabarovsk, HC Neftekhimik Nizhnekamsk, HC Spartak Moscow, HC Vityaz and HC Yugra.
