= 2006 World Junior A Challenge =

Tournament details
- Host country: Canada
- Venue(s): Farrell Agencies Arena in Yorkton, Saskatchewan
- Dates: November 6, 2006 – November 12, 2006
- Teams: 6

Final positions
- Champions: Canada West (1st title)
- Runners-up: Canada East
- Third place: Russia
- Fourth place: Slovakia

Tournament statistics
- Games played: 13
- Scoring leader(s): (Canada) Kyle Turris (11 pts.)

Awards
- MVP: (Canada) Kyle Turris

The World Junior A Challenge 2006 was an international Junior "A" ice hockey tournament hosted by Hockey Canada. The 2006 World Junior A Challenge was hosted by the Canadian City of Yorkton, Saskatchewan.

== Summary ==
The final was between Canada East and Canada West. The West came out on fire early with two quick goals from Jordie Johnston of the La Ronge Ice Wolves, and took a 4-0 lead before the halfway point of the game. The East came back, led by two third period goals by David Kostuch of the Markham Waxers, but in the end they came up short. The West won the first ever WJAC with a 4-3 victory. The Gold medal game was the only game of the tournament to be nationally televised. It was pre-taped and played on November 18, 2006 by TSN, a week after the game was actually played. All games, except the final, were webcast by Hockey Canada. The Final, due to a contractual agreement with TSN, was not allowed to be webcast.

The Bronze Medal Game was played between Slovakia and Russia. After 3 periods, the game was tied 1-1. After an Overtime and Shootout, the Russians came out on top 2-1. They outshot the Slovaks 49-16.

== 2006 Exhibition Play ==
November 1, 2006

Canada East defeated Nipawin Hawks/Melfort Mustangs Combines (SJHL) 4-3 at Nipawin, Saskatchewan
Canada West defeated Weyburn Red Wings (SJHL) 12-0 at Weyburn, Saskatchewan
Russia defeated Dauphin Kings (MJHL) 4-2 at Dauphin, Manitoba

November 2, 2006

Canada East defeated Russia 4-2 at Melfort, Saskatchewan

November 3, 2006

Winkler Flyers (MJHL) defeated Germany 4-2 at Winkler, Manitoba
Canada West defeated Slovakia 4-0 at Weyburn, Saskatchewan

November 4, 2006

Canada West defeated Germany 11-2 at Estevan, Saskatchewan
Neepawa Natives (MJHL) defeated Belarus 8-4 at Brandon, Manitoba
Russia defeated Notre Dame Hounds (SJHL) 8-2 at Esterhazy, Saskatchewan

November 5, 2006

Canada East defeated Belarus 3-2 at Yorkton, Saskatchewan

== 2006 Tournament ==
=== Group A ===
| Team | Pld | W | L | D | GF | GA | GD | Pts |
|---|---|---|---|---|---|---|---|---|
| Canada West | 2 | 2 | 0 | 0 | 16 | 4 | +12 | 4 |
| Russia | 2 | 1 | 1 | 0 | 9 | 7 | +2 | 2 |
| Belarus | 2 | 0 | 2 | 0 | 3 | 17 | −14 | 0 |

==== Results ====
November 6, 2006

Canada West defeated Russia 6-2

November 7, 2006

Russia defeated Belarus 7-1

November 8, 2006

Canada West defeated Belarus 10-2

=== Group B ===
| Team | Pld | W | L | D | GF | GA | GD | Pts |
|---|---|---|---|---|---|---|---|---|
| Canada East | 2 | 2 | 0 | 0 | 8 | 2 | +6 | 4 |
| Slovakia | 2 | 1 | 1 | 0 | 4 | 5 | −1 | 2 |
| Germany | 2 | 0 | 2 | 0 | 2 | 7 | −5 | 0 |

==== Results ====
November 6, 2006

Slovakia defeated Germany 3-1

November 7, 2006

Canada East defeated Slovakia 4-1

November 8, 2006

Canada East defeated Germany 4-1

== Championship Round ==
Qualifier
B2 | Slovakia | 8
A3 | Belarus | 2
A2 | Russia | 7
B3 | Germany | 1

Semi-finals
A1 | Canada West | 7
B2 | Slovakia | 1
B1 | Canada East | 5
A2 | Russia | 1

Championship
A1 | Canada West | 4
B1 | Canada East | 3

Note: Qualifier games on November 9, Semi-final games on November 11, Final game on November 12, 2006.

Bronze Medal Game on November 12, 2006

Russia defeated Slovakia 2-1 in Overtime Shootout

5th Place Game on November 11, 2006

Germany defeated Belarus 8-3

=== Final standings ===
| | Team |
|---|---|
| 1st place, gold medalist(s) | Canada West |
| 2nd place, silver medalist(s) | Canada East |
| 3rd place, bronze medalist(s) | Russia |
| 4th | Slovakia |
| 5th | Germany |
| 6th | Belarus |

== Statistics ==
=== Scoring Leaders ===
| Name | Team | GP | G | A | P | PIM |
|---|---|---|---|---|---|---|
| (Canada) Kyle Turris | Canada West | 4 | 5 | 6 | 11 | 4 |
| (Canada) Casey Pierro-Zabotel | Canada West | 4 | 3 | 6 | 9 | 4 |
| (Canada) Tyler McNeely | Canada West | 4 | 4 | 4 | 8 | 4 |
| (Canada) Deron Cousens | Canada West | 4 | 2 | 5 | 7 | 4 |
| (Russia) Maxim Isaev | Russia | 5 | 1 | 6 | 7 | 2 |

=== Goaltending leaders ===
| Name | Team | GP | Mins | Shots | GA | SO | GAA | Sv% | Record |
|---|---|---|---|---|---|---|---|---|---|
| (Russia) Dmitri Voloshin | Russia | 4 | 205 | 63 | 4 | 0 | 1.17 | 0.937 | 3-0-0-0 |
| (Slovakia) Jaroslav Janus | Slovakia | 4 | 210 | 125 | 9 | 0 | 2.57 | 0.928 | 1-0-0-1 |
| (Canada) Cameron Talbot | Canada East | 4 | 240 | 83 | 7 | 0 | 1.75 | 0.916 | 3-1-0-0 |
| (Slovakia) Matus Andreanin | Slovakia | 2 | 100 | 59 | 6 | 0 | 3.60 | 0.898 | 1-1-0-0 |
| (Canada) Keanan Boomer | Canada West | 4 | 213 | 67 | 7 | 0 | 1.98 | 0.896 | 4-0-0-0 |

== Rosters ==
=== Belarus ===
(Belarus) Players: Vitali Bialinski, Anton Mitskevich, Mikhail Karpeichyk, Vitali Marchanka, Ivan Nachaunoi, Siarhei Sheleh, Aliaksandr Yeronau, Nikolai Goncharov, Viachaslau Raitsou, Aleh Haroshka, Philip Maistrenka, Aliaksandr Famin, Pavel Razvadouski, Igor Revenko, Kiryl Brykun, Andrei Kolasau, Dzmitry Verameichyk, Valeri Bojarskih, Artsiom Dziamkou, Yauheni Salamonau, Andrei Zaleuski, Ihar Varashylau, Uladzimir Mikhailau

Staff: Sergei Opimakh, Pavel Perapekhin, Aliksandr Haurylionak, Valery Ivanis, Andrei Kanstantsinovich

=== Canada East ===
(Canada) Players: Scott Greenham, Cameron Talbot, Ryan Burkholder, Alain Goulet, Scott Levigne, Brock Matheson, Brendan Smith, Jeff Terminesi, Mike Ward, Will Acton, Spencer Anderson, Jean-Phillipe Beaulieu, Glenn Belmore, Louie Caporusso, Scott Freeman, Mike Gailbraith, Kyle Goodchild, Jordan Knox, David Kostuch, Michael Lecomte, Keif Orsini, Paul Zanette

Staff: Brent Ladds, Paul Currie, Jerome Dupont, Marty Abrams, Troy Ryan, Dave Campbell, Bill O'Connor

=== Canada West ===
(Canada) Players: Keanan Boomer, Guillaume Perusse, Deron Cousens, Ryan de Vries, Maury Edwards, Jason Gray, Kyle Haines, Damon Kipp, Evan Oberg, Cody Danberg, Justin Fontaine, Justin Gvora, Tyson Hobbins, Jordie Johnston, Joel Malchuk, Tyler McNeely, Chad Nehring, Kyle Ostrow, Casey Pierro-Zabotel, Kyle Reed, Kyle Turris, Ben Winnett

Staff: Kim Davis, Darcy Rota, Boris Rybalka, Bruno Campese, Ken Pearson, Dwight McMillan, Ron Holloway, Don Pindus

=== Germany ===
(Germany) Players: Markus Keller, Bjorn Linda, Andreas Tanzer, Nikolaus Senger, Andre Mangold, Sinan Akdag, Sebastian Eickmann, Florian Muller, Andreas Gawlik, Gregor Stein, Denis Reul, Jens Heyer, Nicolas Ackermann, Robin Thomson, Markus Ruderer, Michael Rimbeck, Martin Buchwieser, Michael Christ, Martin Leismuller, Patrick Geiger, Dennis Fischbuch, Andre Huebscher, Alexander Oblinger, Daniel Möhle, Daniel Oppolzer, Thomas Dreischer, Steven Rupprich, Gerit Fauser, Marc Wittforth, David Wolf, Martin Hinterstocker, Phillip Michl

Staff: Michael Pfuhl, James Andrew Setters, Thomas Schadler, Alfred Stockbauer, Yasser El-Laymony, Dennis Sattler

=== Russia ===
(Russia) Players: Dmitri Voloshin, Sergey Gayduchenko, Yakov Seleznev, Maxim Isaev, Andrey Kolesnikov, Maksim Goncharov, Vladimir Repin, Nikolay Lukyanchikov, Andrey Konev, Albert Polinin, Mikhail Churlyaev, Denis Trakhanov, Alexander Vasiliev, Vladimir Bakika, Vitaly Karamnov, Dmitry Tsyganov, Kim Dovlatyan, Denis Fakhrutdinov, Egor Averin, Sergey Korostin, Maksim Mayorov, Nikita Klyukin, Egor Dubrovskiy, Ilya Fedin, Evgeny Dadonov, Ruben Begunts

Staff: Andrey Fedorov, Radj Dovlatyan, Miskhat Fakhrutdinov, Vladimir Koluzganov, Igor Semenov, Yuri Leonov, Nikolay Kulikov, Viktor Tsyplakov, Sergey Vinnikov

=== Slovakia ===
(Slovakia) Players: Jaroslav Janus, Matus Andreanin, Marek Daloga, Branislav Horvath, Jan Brejcak, Martin Baca, Marek Pekar, Matus Vizvary, Antonin Hruska, Michal Kozak, Dalimir Jancovic, Marek Mertel, Tomas Vyletelka, Martin Stepan, Milan Kytnar, Matej Misura, Adam Bezak, Ondrej Rusnak, Juraj Paulen, Martin Filo, Lubos Dobry, Vladimir Mikula,

Staff: Jan Filic, Tibor Danis, Dusan Halahija, Josef Hrtus, Juraj Nemcek, Pavol Klobusicky

== Awards ==
Most Valuable Player

Kyle Turris (Canada West)

All-Star Team

Goaltender - Jaroslav Janus (Slovakia)
Defenseman – Deron Cousens (Canada West)
Defenseman – Maxim Isaev (Russia)
Forward – Louie Caporusso (Canada East)
Forward – Sergey Korostin (Russia)
Forward – Kyle Turris (Canada West)
