= Vitaly Karamnov =

Russian ice hockey player (born 1989)

- Born: August 8, 1989 (age 35); Moscow, Russian SFSR
- Height: 6 ft 1 in (185 cm)
- Weight: 198 lb (90 kg; 14 st 2 lb)
- Position: Center
- Shoots: Right
- VHL team Former teams: Saryarka Karagandy; HC Dynamo Moscow; Dinamo Riga; HC Lev Praha; HC Sibir Novosibirsk
- National team: Russia
- Playing career: 2008–present

Medal record

Ice hockey

Representing Russia

IIHF World U18 Championship
Gold medal – first place	2007 Finland	

World Junior A Challenge
Bronze medal – third place	2006 Yorkton	

Vitaly Karamnov (Russian: Карамнов Виталий Витальевич; born August 8, 1989, Moscow) is a Russian professional ice hockey center currently playing for Ermak Angarsk of the Supreme Hockey League.

At the 2007 IIHF World U18 Championships Karamnov won gold medal.

== Career statistics ==
=== Regular season and playoffs ===
			Regular season					Playoffs
Season	Team	League	GP	G	A	Pts	PIM	GP	G	A	Pts	PIM
2006–07	Dynamo Moscow	RSL	2	0	0	0	0	—	—	—	—	—
2007–08	Everett Silvertips	WHL	61	10	15	25	61	—	—	—	—	—
2008–09	Dynamo Moscow	KHL	11	1	0	1	10	—	—	—	—	—
2009–10	Dynamo Moscow	KHL	7	0	2	2	0	—	—	—	—	—
2009–10	MHC Dynamo	MHL	42	21	24	45	60	—	—	—	—	—
KHL Totals			18	1	2	3	10	—	—	—	—	—

=== International ===
Year	Team	Comp	Place	GP	G	A	Pts	PIM
2007	Russia	WJC18	1st place, gold medalist(s)	7	0	3	3	6
Junior int'l Totals				7	0	3	3	6
