= Catamount Cup =

US men's college ice hockey tournament

The Catamount Cup (also known as the Sheraton/TD Bank Catamount Cup for sponsorship reasons) is an annual men's college ice hockey tournament hosted by the University of Vermont in Burlington, Vermont. The tournament is contested by the Vermont Catamounts and three visiting teams. Since the inaugural tournament in 1990, it has been held on and off either just before or after New Year's Eve.

As opposed to most in-season tournament, all Catamount Cup games are scheduled before the tournament begins and there is no formal championship game. If teams are tied in record at the end of the tournament goal differential is used as the tie-breaker.

== Yearly results ==
Year	Champion	Runner-up	Third place	Fourth place
1990	New Hampshire	Vermont	Dartmouth	Northeastern
1993	New Hampshire	Boston University	Vermont	Dartmouth
1995	Minnesota–Duluth	Dartmouth	Vermont & Boston College (tie)	
1997	Dartmouth	Providence	Bowling Green	Vermont
1999	Boston College	Vermont	Dartmouth & Ohio State (tie)	
2000	New Hampshire	Minnesota State–Mankato	Minnesota–Duluth	Vermont
2001	Lake Superior State	Dartmouth	Merrimack	Vermont
2003	Dartmouth	Minnesota State–Mankato	Vermont	Massachusetts
2005	Vermont	Clarkson	Dartmouth	Bemidji State
2006	St. Cloud State	Vermont	Union	Rensselaer
2007	Quinnipiac	Vermont	Western Michigan	Holy Cross
2008	Vermont	St. Lawrence	Ferris State	Colgate
2009	Vermont	Minnesota–Duluth	Alabama–Huntsville	Mercyhurst
2010	Ohio State	Army	Vermont	Harvard
2011	RIT	Lake Superior State	Vermont	Ferris State
2012	Vermont	Union	Princeton	Merrimack
2013	Massachusetts–Lowell	Vermont	Clarkson	Canisius
2014	Providence	Vermont	Massachusetts	Air Force
2015	Vermont	Colgate	Lake Superior State	Brown
2017	St. Lawrence	Massachusetts–Lowell	Harvard	Vermont
2018	Vermont	Northeastern	Rensselaer	Alabama–Huntsville
2019	Vermont	Providence	Union	Lake Superior State

== Appearances ==
Team	Appearances	Championships
Vermont	22	7
New Hampshire	3	3
Dartmouth	8	2
Quinnipiac	1	1
RIT	1	1
St. Cloud State	1	1
Boston College	2	1
Massachusetts–Lowell	2	1
Ohio State	2	1
St. Lawrence	2	1
Minnesota–Duluth	3	1
Providence	3	1
Lake Superior State	4	1
Air Force	1	0
Army	1	0
Bemidji State	1	0
Boston University	1	0
Bowling Green	1	0
Brown	1	0
Canisius	1	0
Holy Cross	1	0
Mercyhurst	1	0
Princeton	1	0
Western Michigan	1	0
Alabama–Huntsville	2	0
Clarkson	2	0
Colgate	2	0
Ferris State	2	0
Harvard	2	0
Massachusetts	2	0
Merrimack	2	0
Minnesota State	2	0
Northeastern	2	0
Rensselaer	2	0
Union	3	0
