= Sergei Fedin =

Russian footballer

Personal information
- Full name: Sergei Sergeyevich Fedin
- Date of birth: 31 December 1981 (age 44)
- Place of birth: Oryol, Russian SFSR
- Height: 1.73 m (5 ft 8 in)
- Position: Midfielder

Senior career*
Years	Team	Apps	(Gls)
1998–2000	FC Lokomotiv-2 Moscow	70	(0)
2001	FC Lokomotiv Moscow	0	(0)
2001	FC Kolomna	20	(2)
2002	FC Pskov-2000	10	(0)
2003–2004	FC Energetik Uren	47	(6)
2005–2007	FC Sodovik Sterlitamak	45	(3)
2008	FC Rusichi Oryol	29	(2)
2009	FC Dynamo Bryansk	7	(0)
2009	FC Fakel Voronezh	2	(0)
2010	FC Spartak Tambov	26	(2)
2011	FC Khimik Dzerzhinsk	23	(0)
2013–2014	FC Kolomna	21	(2)
2014–2015	FC Oryol	14	(0)
- * Club domestic league appearances and goals

Sergei Sergeyevich Fedin (Russian: Серге́й Серге́евич Федин; born 31 December 1981) is a former Russian professional football player.

== Club career ==
He played two seasons in the Russian Football National League for FC Sodovik Sterlitamak.
