= Ilya Fedin =

Russian professional ice hockey winger

- Born: May 6, 1989 (age 36) Podgorny, Soviet Union
- Height: 6 ft 1 in (185 cm)
- Weight: 212 lb (96 kg; 15 st 2 lb)
- Position: Right Wing
- Shoots: Right
- VHL team Former teams: Neftyanik Almetievsk; Atlant Moscow Oblast; HC Sochi
- Playing career: 2010–present

Medal record

Ice hockey

Representing Russia

World Junior A Challenge
Bronze medal – third place	2006 Yorkton	

Ilya Albertovich Fedin (Russian: Илья Альбертович Федин; born May 6, 1989) is a Russian professional ice hockey winger who currently plays for Neftyanik Almetievsk of the Supreme Hockey League (VHL). He previously played for Atlant Moscow Oblast and HC Sochi of the Kontinental Hockey League (KHL).

== Career statistics ==
			Regular season					Playoffs
Season	Team	League	GP	G	A	Pts	PIM	GP	G	A	Pts	PIM
2005–06	Omskie Yastreby	Russia3	3	0	0	0	0	—	—	—	—	—
2006–07	Avangard Omsk-2	Russia3	34	3	7	10	44	—	—	—	—	—
2007–08	Avangard Omsk	Russia	2	0	0	0	0	—	—	—	—	—
2007–08	Avangard Omsk-2	Russia3	60	20	24	44	96	—	—	—	—	—
2008–09	Avangard Omsk-2	Russia3	7	2	4	6	28	—	—	—	—	—
2009–10	Izhstal Izhevsk	Russia2	37	9	12	21	51	9	3	1	4	4
2010–11	Atlant Mytishchi	KHL	9	0	3	3	2	—	—	—	—	—
2010–11	HC Ryazan	VHL	28	7	8	15	28	—	—	—	—	—
2010–11	Mytishchinskie Atlanty	MHL	6	3	5	8	4	3	0	0	0	18
2011–12	Titan Klin	VHL	21	2	5	7	28	—	—	—	—	—
2011–12	Molot-Prikamye Perm	VHL	16	1	7	8	2	3	0	0	0	0
2012–13	Molot-Prikamye Perm	VHL	45	2	6	8	30	10	2	2	4	4
2013–14	Molot-Prikamye Perm	VHL	47	5	17	22	22	15	1	1	2	6
2014–15	Molot-Prikamye Perm	VHL	50	10	20	30	26	12	2	2	4	6
2015–16	HC Sochi	KHL	1	0	0	0	0	—	—	—	—	—
2015–16	Buran Voronezh	VHL	3	0	0	0	0	—	—	—	—	—
2015–16	Dizel Penza	VHL	12	2	1	3	4	—	—	—	—	—
2015–16	Zauralie Kurgan	VHL	13	0	2	2	6	5	1	0	1	0
2016–17	Neftyanik Almetyevsk	VHL	11	0	0	0	0	—	—	—	—	—
2016–17	Yermak Angarsk	VHL	29	4	7	11	8	6	1	0	1	4
2017–18	Yermak Angarsk	VHL	21	2	1	3	8	—	—	—	—	—
2017–18	Izhstal Izhevsk	VHL	11	2	1	3	6	—	—	—	—	—
KHL totals			10	0	3	3	2	—	—	—	—	—
VHL totals			307	37	75	112	168	51	7	5	12	20
