= Matti Järvinen (ice hockey, born 1989) =

Finnish ice hockey player

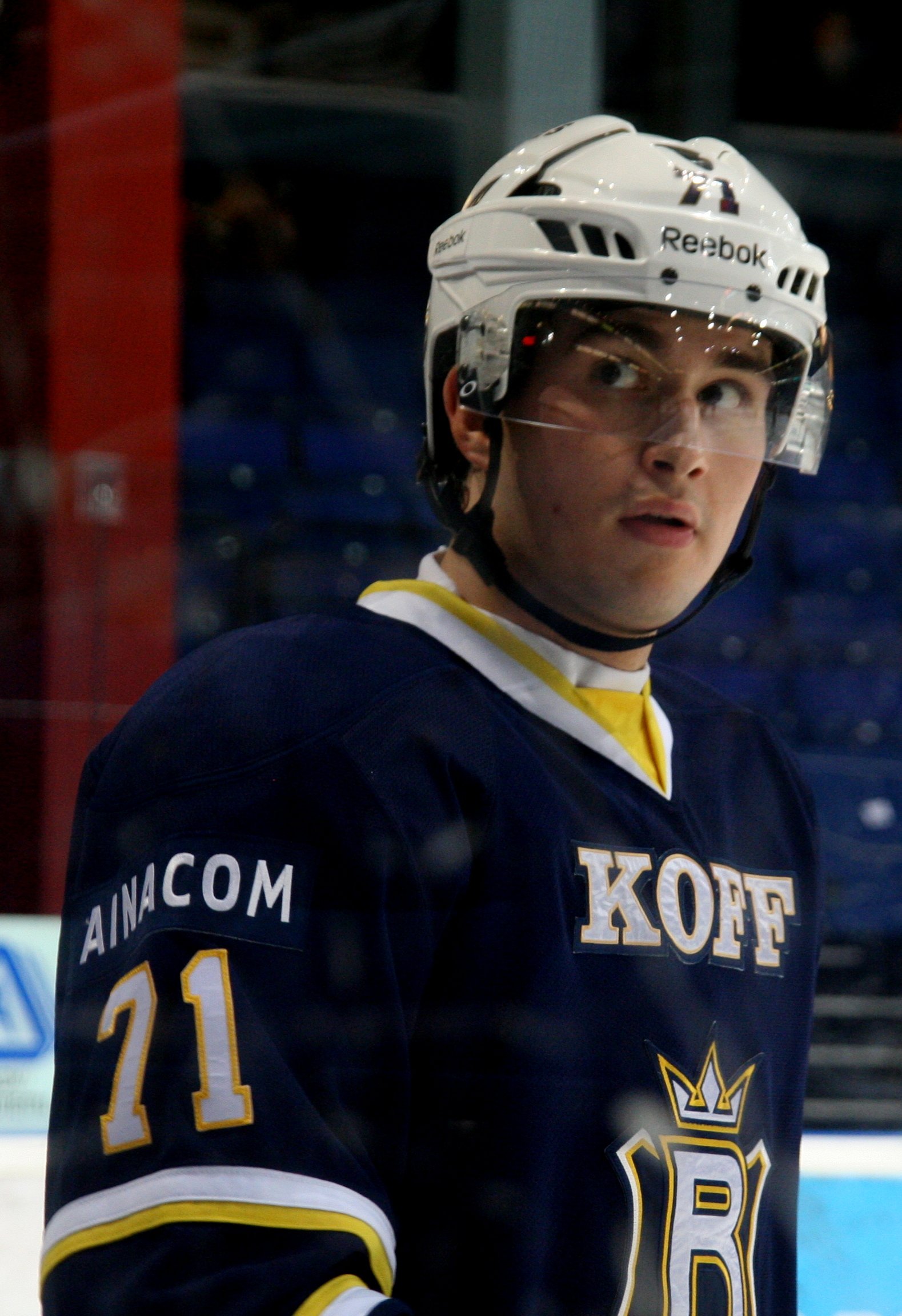
- Järvinen playing for the Espoo Blues
- Born: 14 October 1989 (age 36) London, England
- Height: 6 ft 4 in (193 cm)
- Weight: 198 lb (90 kg; 14 st 2 lb)
- Position: Centre
- Shoots: Left
- Liiga team Former teams: Kiekko-Espoo; Espoo Blues; SaiPa; EV Zug; Tappara; KalPa; Grizzlys Wolfsburg; KalPa; HPK; BK Mlada Boleslav; Kiekko-Espoo
- NHL draft: Undrafted
- Playing career: 2010–present

Matti Järvinen (born 14 October 1989) is a Finnish professional ice hockey center. His is currently playing with HPK in the Liiga

Järvinen made his SM-liiga debut playing with Espoo Blues during the 2011–12 SM-liiga season.

== Awards and honours ==
Award	Year
All-CHA Rookie Team	2009–10
CHA (NCAA) Champion	2009–10
