= Davide Nicoletti =

Canadian-born Italian ice hockey player

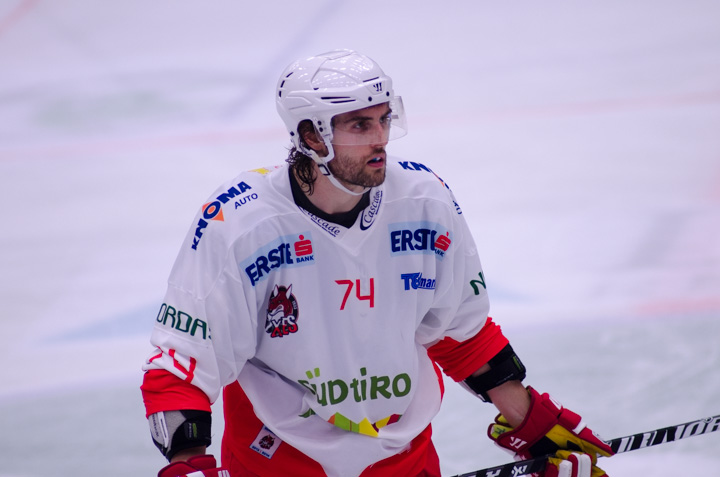
- Nicoletti playing for HC Bolzano
- Born: March 22, 1986 (age 40) Toronto, Ontario, Canada
- Position: Defence
- Shot: Left
- Played for: SG Pontebba; Braehead Clan; Cincinnati Cyclones; HC Bolzano; HC Valpellice
- National team: Italy
- NHL draft: Undrafted
- Playing career: 2010–2016

Davide Anthony “Dave” Nicoletti (born March 22, 1986) is a Canadian-born Italian former professional ice hockey defenceman.

Nicoletti played in NCAA Division I for the Alabama–Huntsville Chargers before turning professional in 2010 with SG Pontebba in Italy's Serie A where he stayed for two seasons. He split the 2012–13 season playing in the Elite Ice Hockey League in the United Kingdom for the Braehead Clan and the ECHL for the Cincinnati Cyclones. He then moved to the Erste Bank Eishockey Liga based in Austria to join Italian team HC Bolzano, where he was part of the team that became the first non-Austrian team to win the EBEL Championship. He returned to Serie A in 2015 for HC Valpellice before making a brief return to Bolzano in the EBEL, playing in three regular season games and six playoff games.

Nicoletti represented Team Italy in the 2014 IIHF World Championship.
