= Danton Cole =

American ice hockey player and coach

- Born: January 10, 1967 (age 59) Pontiac, Michigan, U.S.
- Height: 5 ft 11 in (180 cm)
- Weight: 185 lb (84 kg; 13 st 3 lb)
- Position: Right wing
- Shot: Right
- Played for: Winnipeg Jets; Tampa Bay Lightning; New Jersey Devils; New York Islanders; Chicago Blackhawks
- National team: United States
- NHL draft: 123rd overall, 1985; Winnipeg Jets
- Playing career: 1989–2000
- Coaching career

Biographical details
- Education: Michigan State

Coaching career (HC unless noted)
- 1999–2001: Grand Rapids Griffins (assistant)
- 2001–2002: Muskegon Fury
- 2002–2005: Grand Rapids Griffins
- 2004–2006: Motor City Mechanics
- 2006–2007: Bowling Green (assistant)
- 2007–2010: Alabama-Huntsville
- 2010–2017: US NTDP
- 2017–2022: Michigan State

Head coaching record
- Overall: 81–160–24 (.351)
- Tournaments: 0–1

Accomplishments and honors

Championships
- 2010 CHA tournament champion

Danton Edward Cole (born January 10, 1967) is an American former professional hockey player and the former head coach of the Michigan State Spartans men's hockey team. He had guided the USA Hockey Under-18 team to a pair of gold medals and a bronze medal at the IIHF World U18 Championships during his seven seasons at the helm from 2010 to 2017. As a player, he spent seven seasons in the National Hockey League (NHL) with the Winnipeg Jets, Tampa Bay Lightning, New Jersey Devils, New York Islanders and Chicago Blackhawks.

== Playing career ==
Cole was drafted by the Winnipeg Jets in the 6th round, 123rd overall in the 1985 NHL Entry Draft. He then went to Michigan State University where he played for 4 years, scoring 62 points in 47 games his senior year there. Cole then reported to the Moncton Hawks of the AHL for the 1989–1990 season, playing in 80 games. That year he also made his NHL debut with the Jets, scoring 2 points in 2 games. The next year he earned a full-time spot with the Jets and played there for another 2 years.

Prior to the 1992–1993 season Cole was traded to the newly formed Tampa Bay Lightning and became part of the original Lightning roster. While with the Lightning Cole enjoyed his best season in the NHL, when he scored 43 points in 81 games during the 1993–1994 season. The 1994–1995 season saw Cole play the majority of the season with the Lightning before being traded to the New Jersey Devils. That year the Devils won the Stanley Cup and Cole had his name engraved on the Cup.

Following the Stanley Cup win Cole played the majority of the 1995–1996 season in the IHL. He also played with the New York Islanders and Chicago Blackhawks but saw only 12 games the whole season. This would be the last time Cole played in the NHL. He then split a year playing in Germany and the Grand Rapids Griffins, followed by two full years with the Griffins. Cole then played 2 games with the Griffins during the 1999–2000 season before officially announcing his retirement.

== Coaching career ==
Immediately after retiring, Cole joined the Griffins as an assistant coach. He stayed there until the 2001–2002 season when he coached the Muskegon Fury of the UHL for one season, leading them to a championship win. He then joined the Griffins again, this time as head coach, and coached there until he was replaced midseason during the 2004–2005 season. Cole was assistant coach at Bowling Green State University during 2005 to 2007. Cole was the head coach at the University of Alabama in Huntsville starting with the 2007–2008 season. As head coach of the UAH Hockey team, in the 2009–2010 season, Cole brought UAH to its second ever appearance into the NCAA tournament by winning the CHA conference tournament in over time 3–2. Following the 2009–10 season, Cole resigned as UAH's head coach to accept a coaching position with the USA Hockey National Team Development Program.

On April 11, 2017, he was appointed head coach at his alma mater, Michigan State. On April 12, 2022, he was fired by Michigan State. During five seasons as head coach, he led the Spartans to a 58–101–12 record.

== Career statistics ==
=== Regular season and playoffs ===
| | | | Regular season | | | | | Playoffs |
| Season | Team | League | GP | G | A | Pts | PIM | GP | G | A | Pts | PIM |
|---|---|---|---|---|---|---|---|---|---|---|---|---|
| 1983–84 | Fraser Flags | GLJHL | — | — | — | — | — | — | — | — | — | — |
| 1984–85 | Aurora Tigers | OJHL | 41 | 51 | 44 | 95 | 91 | — | — | — | — | — |
| 1985–86 | Michigan State University | CCHA | 43 | 11 | 10 | 21 | 22 | — | — | — | — | — |
| 1986–87 | Michigan State University | CCHA | 44 | 9 | 15 | 24 | 16 | — | — | — | — | — |
| 1987–88 | Michigan State University | CCHA | 46 | 20 | 36 | 56 | 38 | — | — | — | — | — |
| 1988–89 | Michigan State University | CCHA | 47 | 29 | 33 | 62 | 46 | — | — | — | — | — |
| 1989–90 | Moncton Hawks | AHL | 80 | 31 | 42 | 73 | 18 | — | — | — | — | — |
| 1989–90 | Winnipeg Jets | NHL | 2 | 1 | 1 | 2 | 0 | — | — | — | — | — |
| 1990–91 | Moncton Hawks | AHL | 3 | 1 | 1 | 2 | 0 | — | — | — | — | — |
| 1990–91 | Winnipeg Jets | NHL | 66 | 13 | 11 | 24 | 24 | — | — | — | — | — |
| 1991–92 | Winnipeg Jets | NHL | 52 | 7 | 5 | 12 | 32 | — | — | — | — | — |
| 1992–93 | Atlanta Knights | IHL | 1 | 1 | 0 | 1 | 2 | — | — | — | — | — |
| 1992–93 | Tampa Bay Lightning | NHL | 67 | 12 | 15 | 27 | 23 | — | — | — | — | — |
| 1993–94 | Tampa Bay Lightning | NHL | 81 | 20 | 23 | 43 | 32 | — | — | — | — | — |
| 1994–95 | Tampa Bay Lightning | NHL | 26 | 3 | 3 | 6 | 6 | — | — | — | — | — |
| 1994–95 | New Jersey Devils | NHL | 12 | 1 | 2 | 3 | 8 | 1 | 0 | 0 | 0 | 0 |
| 1995–96 | Utah Grizzlies | IHL | 34 | 28 | 15 | 43 | 22 | — | — | — | — | — |
| 1995–96 | Indianapolis Ice | IHL | 32 | 9 | 12 | 21 | 20 | 5 | 1 | 5 | 6 | 8 |
| 1995–96 | New York Islanders | NHL | 10 | 1 | 0 | 1 | 0 | — | — | — | — | — |
| 1995–96 | Chicago Blackhawks | NHL | 2 | 0 | 0 | 0 | 0 | — | — | — | — | — |
| 1996–97 | Krefeld Pinguine | DEL | 28 | 7 | 12 | 19 | 14 | — | — | — | — | — |
| 1996–97 | Grand Rapids Griffins | IHL | 35 | 8 | 18 | 26 | 24 | 5 | 3 | 1 | 4 | 2 |
| 1997–98 | Grand Rapids Griffins | IHL | 81 | 13 | 13 | 26 | 36 | — | — | — | — | — |
| 1998–99 | Grand Rapids Griffins | IHL | 72 | 14 | 11 | 25 | 50 | — | — | — | — | — |
| 1999–00 | Grand Rapids Griffins | IHL | 2 | 0 | 0 | 0 | 0 | — | — | — | — | — |
| IHL totals | | | 257 | 73 | 69 | 142 | 154 | 13 | 5 | 7 | 12 | 10 |
| NHL totals | | | 318 | 58 | 60 | 118 | 125 | 1 | 0 | 0 | 0 | 0 |

=== International ===
| Year | Team | Event | GP | G | A | Pts | PIM |
|---|---|---|---|---|---|---|---|
| 1990 | United States | WC | 10 | 2 | 1 | 3 | 6 |
| 1991 | United States | WC | 10 | 6 | 4 | 10 | 14 |
| 1994 | United States | WC | 5 | 1 | 1 | 2 | 2 |
| Senior totals | | | 25 | 9 | 6 | 15 | 22 |

== Head coaching record ==
Record table
| Season | Team | Overall | Conference | Standing | Postseason |
|---|---|---|---|---|---|
Alabama-Huntsville Chargers (CHA) (2007–2010)
| 2007–08 | Alabama-Huntsville | 6–21–4 | 3–13–4 | 5th | CHA Quarterfinal |
| 2008–09 | Alabama-Huntsville | 5–20–5 | 3–11–4 | 4th | CHA consolation game (Tie) |
| 2009–10 | Alabama-Huntsville | 12–18–3 | 6–10–2 | t-3rd | NCAA Midwest Regional semifinals |
| Alabama-Huntsville: | | 23–59–12 | 12–34–10 | | |
Michigan State Spartans (Big Ten) (2017–2022)
| 2017–18 | Michigan State | 12–22–2 | 6–16–2 | 7th | Big Ten Quarterfinals |
| 2018–19 | Michigan State | 12–19–5 | 8–12–4–2 | 7th | Big Ten Quarterfinals |
| 2019–20 | Michigan State | 15–19–2 | 11–11–2–0 | 6th | Big Ten Quarterfinals |
| 2020–21 | Michigan State | 7–18–2 | 5–16–1 | 7th | Big Ten Quarterfinals |
| 2021–22 | Michigan State | 12–23–1 | 6–18–1 | 7th | Big Ten Quarterfinals |
| Michigan State: | | 58–101–12 | | | |
| Total: | | 81–160–24 | | | |
National champion Postseason invitational champion Conference regular season champion Conference regular season and conference tournament champion Division regular season champion Division regular season and conference tournament champion Conference tournament champion
