= Cam Talbot =

Canadian ice hockey player (born 1987)

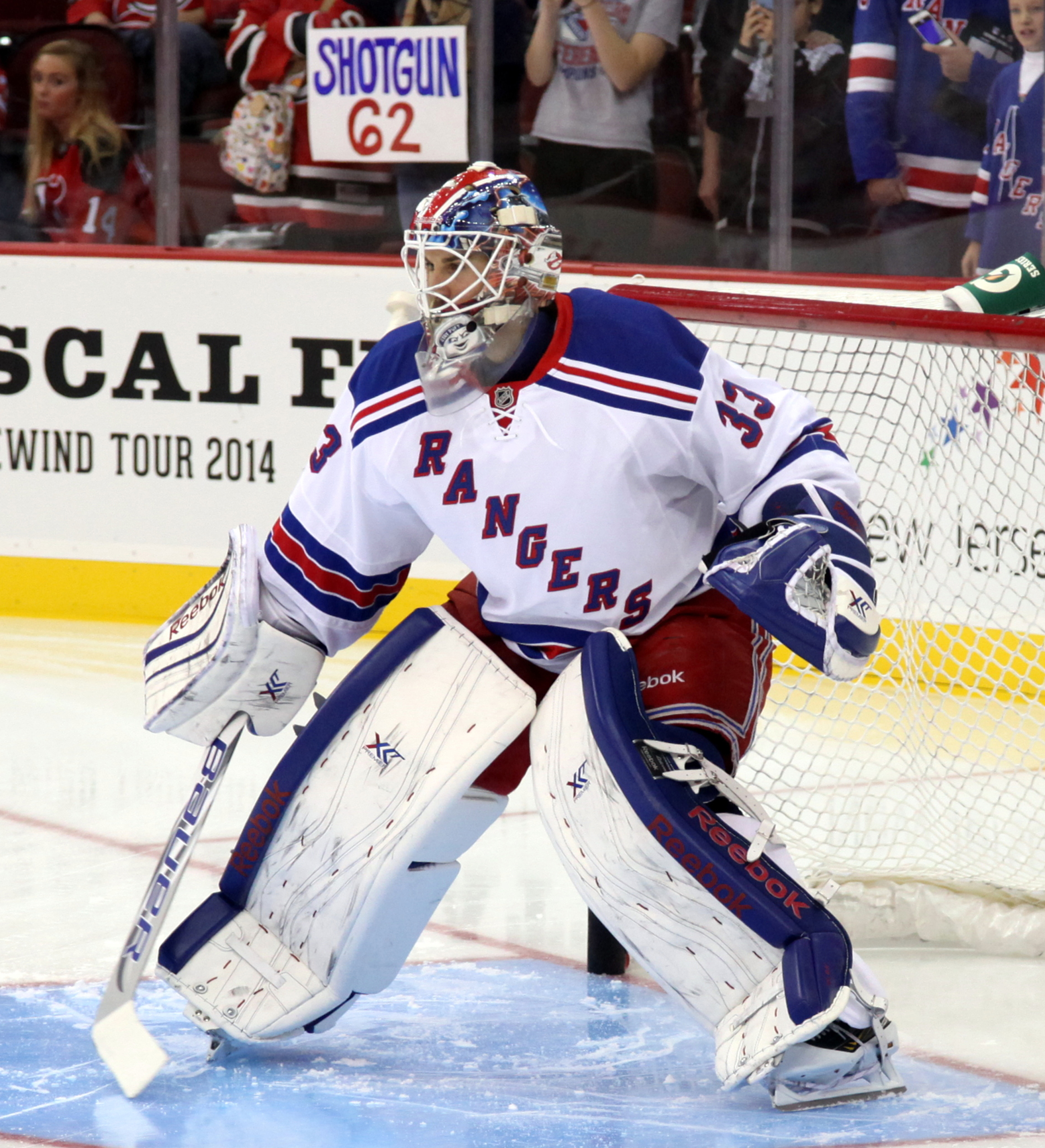
- Talbot with the New York Rangers in 2014
- Born: July 5, 1987 (age 39) Caledonia, Ontario, Canada
- Height: 6 ft 4 in (193 cm)
- Weight: 196 lb (89 kg; 14 st 0 lb)
- Position: Goaltender
- Catches: Left
- NHL team Former teams: Columbus Blue Jackets; New York Rangers; Edmonton Oilers; Philadelphia Flyers; Calgary Flames; Minnesota Wild; Ottawa Senators; Los Angeles Kings; Detroit Red Wings
- National team: Canada
- NHL draft: Undrafted
- Playing career: 2010–present

Cameron Talbot (born July 5, 1987) is a Canadian professional ice hockey player who is a goaltender for the Columbus Blue Jackets in the National Hockey League (NHL). He has also played in the NHL for the New York Rangers, Edmonton Oilers, Philadelphia Flyers, Calgary Flames, Minnesota Wild, Ottawa Senators, Los Angeles Kings, and Detroit Red Wings. In 2026, Talbot became the first goaltender in NHL history to play for nine different franchises; he jointly holds this record with James Reimer, who matched it several weeks later.

Before joining the NHL, Talbot played at the University of Alabama in Huntsville, where he was named an All-College Hockey America Second Team and MVP in the 2010 CHA tournament. Internationally, Talbot has represented Canada at the 2016 IIHF World Championship, where he won gold.

== Playing career ==
=== Amateur ===
Talbot grew up in Caledonia, Ontario, and played minor hockey within the region, going undrafted in the Ontario Hockey League's Priority Selection draft. Talbot made the Hamilton Red Wings of the Ontario Junior Hockey League (OJHL) for the 2004–05 season. In his second season with Hamilton in 2005–06, he was named one of the league's all-stars. He committed to playing college hockey at University of Alabama in Huntsville (UAH) in mid 2006, as they were the only team to approach him. In his final OJHL season in 2006–07, he was named the league's most valuable player and earned all-star honours again. Following his excellent season, several other teams approached him, but he remained committed to UAH. While playing with Hamilton, Talbot attended university for two years which affected his National Collegiate Athletic Association (NCAA) eligibility.

He joined UAH for the 2007–08 season as a freshman and recorded one win and ten losses in 13 appearances, with an .860 save percentage and a 4.63 goals against average (GAA). He improved in his sophomore season in 2008–09 with the UAH Chargers, recording a record of two wins, sixteen losses and three tie games (2–16–3) in 24 appearances, but with a save percentage of .907 and a GAA of 2.95. In his third and final season with the Chargers in 2009–10, he led his team to the College Hockey America (CHA) conference title and a berth in the NCAA Tournament for only the school's second time in its history. He finished the season with a record of 12–18–3, a save percentage of .925 and a GAA of 2.61. In the tournament, the Chargers nearly beat the top-ranked Miami Redhawks, but were ultimately eliminated. He was named to the All-CHA Second Team and was named the Most Valuable Player in the CHA Tournament.

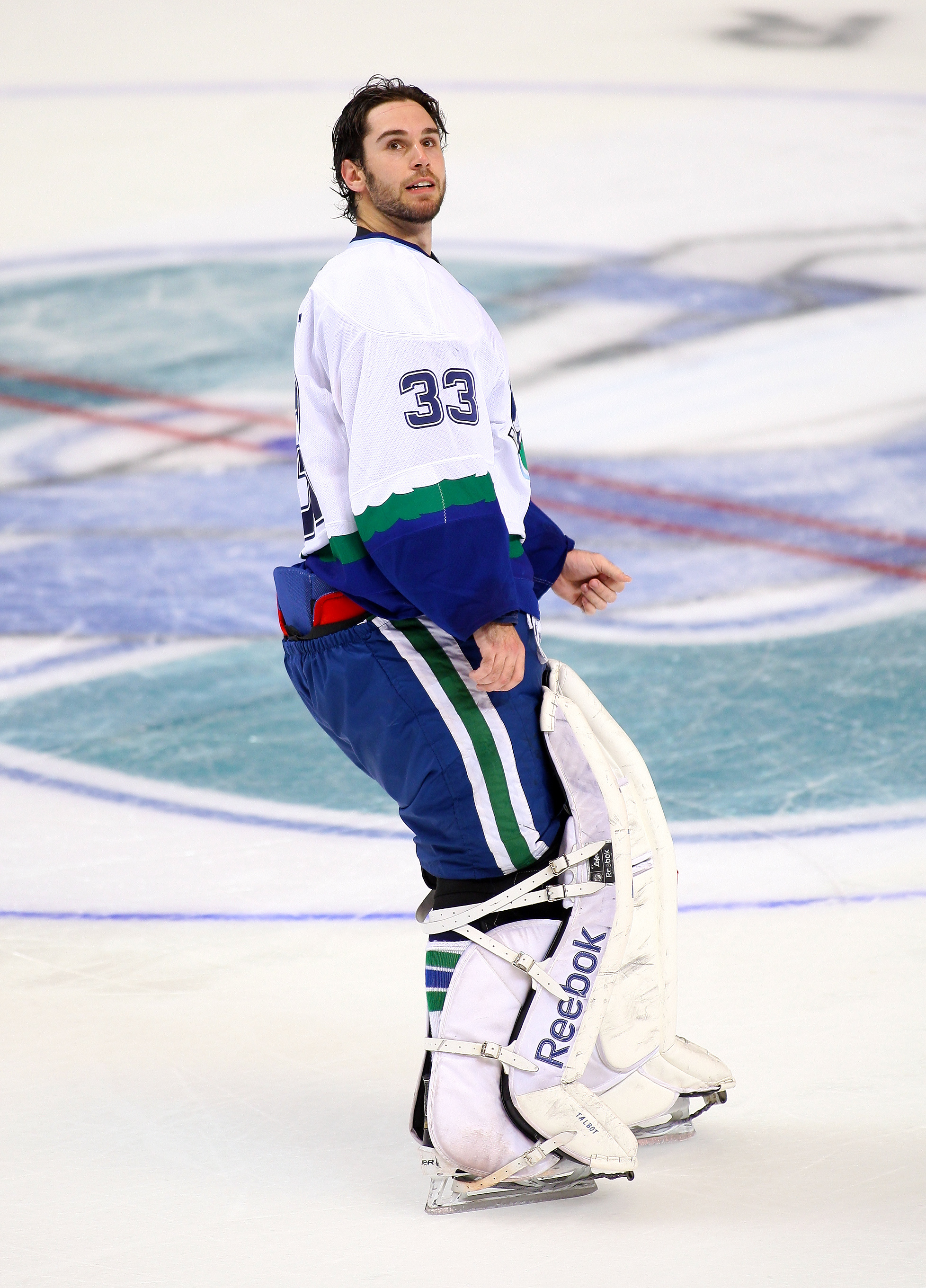
Talbot with the Connecticut Whale in 2012

=== Professional ===
==== New York Rangers ====
As an undrafted free agent, the New York Rangers of the National Hockey League (NHL) signed Talbot to a contract on March 30, 2010. He signed an amateur tryout contract with the Rangers' American Hockey League (AHL) affiliate, the Hartford Wolf Pack on March 31 and made one appearance for the team in the 2009–10 season. He was assigned to the renamed Connecticut Whale to begin the 2010–11 season. However, he suffered an ankle sprain on January 16, 2011, and missed 13 games. After recovering, he was assigned to the Rangers' ECHL affiliate, the Greenville Road Warriors, on February 21. He played in two games with Greenville, going 1–0–1, with a .921 save percentage and a 2.46 GAA. He was promoted to the Rangers directly from Greenville on February 28, but only dressed as the backup to starting goaltender Henrik Lundqvist and was returned to the Whale on March 3, 2011, without appearing. He completed the season in Connecticut where he made 22 appearances with a record of 11–9–2, a save percentage of .902 and a save percentage of 2.84. The team qualified for the playoffs and faced the Portland Pirates in the opening round. Connecticut was eliminated by Portland, with Talbot just starting one game of the series. Talbot played the entire 2011–12 season with Connecticut, making 33 appearances with a record of 14–15–1, a save percentage of .913 and a GAA of 2.61. After the Whale were eliminated in the second round from the AHL playoffs, Talbot was added to the Rangers' Stanley Cup playoff roster, but did not appear. In nine playoff games with Connecticut, he tallied a record of 5–4, with a .939 save percentage and a GAA of 2.10. He was named the Whale's starting goaltender for the 2012–13 season. In 55 games, he had a record of 25–28–1, with a save percentage of .918 and a GAA of 2.63. Connecticut failed to qualify for the playoffs and after the Whale's season ended he was again added to the Rangers' playoff roster but did not make any appearances.

He began the 2013–14 season with the renamed Hartford Wolf Pack. Talbot was called up to the Rangers on October 15, 2013, after Martin Biron was demoted to the AHL, finding himself a place in the NHL for the first time as the backup to starter Henrik Lundqvist. He made his on-ice NHL debut on October 24 in a 2–1 loss to the Philadelphia Flyers. His first NHL win came in his next game, against the Detroit Red Wings, on October 26, 2013, and he earned his first NHL shutout against the Montreal Canadiens on November 16, 2013. He finished the regular season with five games played for Hartford, going 4–0–1 with a .924 save percentage and 2.49 GAA. In 21 games with the Rangers, he went 12–6–1, with a .941 save percentage and 1.64 GAA, with three shutouts. In the 2014 playoffs, Talbot twice entered to relieve Lundqvist en route to the Rangers' Eastern Conference title before ultimately falling to the Los Angeles Kings in the Cup Final. He went 0-1–0 in the two games, with a save percentage of .846 and a GAA of 2.61.

For the 2014–15 season, Talbot began the year as the Rangers' backup goaltender. On December 20, 2014, he signed a one-year extension worth $1.45 million with the Rangers. He took a larger role in February 2015 after Lundqvist went down with a major injury. Talbot started 24 of the Rangers' next 26 games (Mackenzie Skapski played the other two) until March 27, when Lundqvist returned to the line-up. He finished the season with 36 appearances with a 21–9–4 record and a save percentage of .926 and a GAA and .926. For his remarkable efforts towards New York's Presidents' Trophy-winning season, he received the Steve McDonald Extra Effort Award on April 6. Though he backed up Lundqvist throughout the playoffs, he did not make an appearance as the Rangers advanced to the Eastern Conference finals before being eliminated by the Tampa Bay Lightning.

==== Edmonton Oilers ====
On June 27, 2015, Talbot was traded by the Rangers to the Edmonton Oilers in exchange for three draft picks in the 2015 NHL entry draft. He made his Oilers debut on October 8 in a 3–1 loss to the St. Louis Blues. He competed for Edmonton's #1 goaltender spot with Anders Nilsson during his first season with the Oilers in 2015–16. He marked his first shutout with the Oilers on January 4, in a 1–0 victory over the Carolina Hurricanes. On January 17, the Oilers signed Talbot to a three-year, $12 million contract extension. Nilsson was eventually traded to the St. Louis Blues, leaving Talbot as Edmonton's starting goaltender. He finished the regular season with a record of 21–27–5, with three shutouts in 56 appearances with a .917 save percentage and a GAA of 2.55. However, the team finished last in the Western Conference and missed the playoffs.

In the 2016–17 season, Talbot made his debut in an NHL outdoor game in the 2016 Heritage Classic, getting a shutout in a 3–0 victory over the Winnipeg Jets. He had previously participated in two Stadium Series games with the Rangers as a backup, but had not appeared on the ice. On April 6, 2017, he set an Oilers record for most wins in a season passing Grant Fuhr, who had 40 wins, by earning 41 wins. Talbot finished the season by leading the NHL in games played (72 of 82 in the regular season) and time on ice by a goaltender, as well as tied for first in wins with 42. The Oilers finished that season second in the Pacific Division, with 103 points. In the opening round of the 2017 playoffs against the San Jose Sharks, he recorded back-to-back shutouts. Talbot helped the Oilers reach Game 7 of the Western Semifinals, losing to the Anaheim Ducks in the first playoff appearance by the Oilers in ten years. Talbot finished the playoffs with a 2.88 GAA, a .924 save percentage, and two shutouts.

On October 4, 2017, Talbot recorded a 27-save shutout in the 2017–18 season-opener against the Calgary Flames. He and the Oilers would not be able to replicate the previous season's success, and missed the playoffs. He finished the season with a 31–31–3 record with a save percentage of .908 and a GAA of 3.02. He entered the 2018–19 season intending to prove the previous season was a fluke, but his play dipped again and he was surpassed by Mikko Koskinen in the Oilers net. In 31 appearances with Edmonton, he had a record of 10–15–3, with a GAA of 3.36 and a save percentage of .893.

==== Philadelphia Flyers ====
On February 15, 2019, Talbot was traded by the Oilers to the Philadelphia Flyers in exchange for goaltender Anthony Stolarz. Talbot had to waive his no-movement contract clause to be traded to the Flyers. Philadelphia acquired him to be both competition and a mentor to young goaltender Carter Hart and to replace Brian Elliott as backup. He made his Flyers debut on March 1, starting in a 6–3 victory over the New Jersey Devils, and marked the eighth goaltender to play for the team that season, setting a new NHL record. However, his play did not improve with Philadelphia, which was one of the worst teams in terms of goals against. He completed the season with the Flyers, recording a 1–2–0 record in four appearances, with a .881 save percentage and a GAA of 3.70.

==== Calgary Flames ====
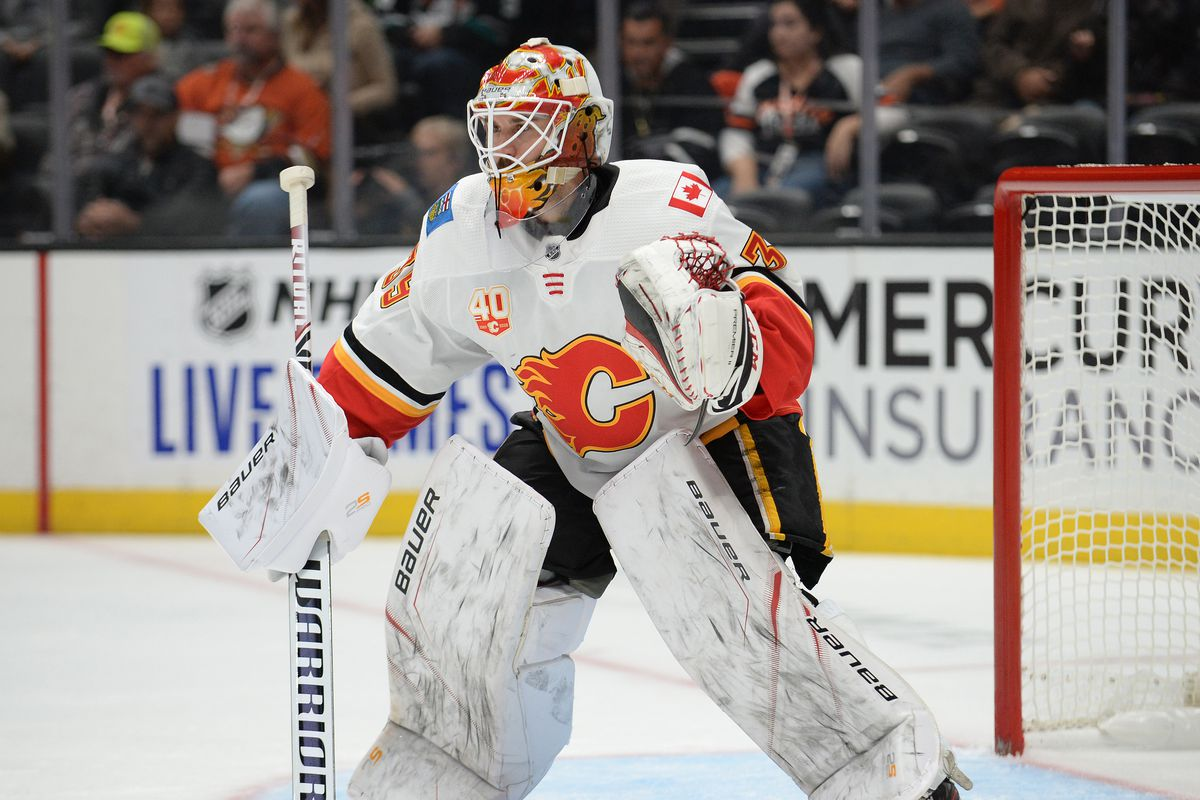
Talbot in net for the Calgary Flames in 2019.

On July 1, 2019, having left the Flyers as an unrestricted free agent, Talbot signed a one-year, $2.75 million deal with the Calgary Flames. He made his first appearance for the Flames in a 2–1 loss to the San Jose Sharks on October 13. Early in the season, Talbot saw less action, backing up starter David Rittich. However, after a coaching change, by mid-season, Talbot became the preferred option. On February 1, 2020, Talbot fought fellow goalie Mike Smith of the Edmonton Oilers during a Battle of Alberta game. He recorded his first shutout with Calgary on February 13 in a 6–0 victory over the Anaheim Ducks, setting a new career-high in saves in a game with 44. The 2019–20 season was cut short by the COVID-19 pandemic when the league stopped all play on March 12. In 26 games, he had a record of 12–10–1, with a save percentage of .919 and a GAA of 2.63. When the NHL returned for the 2020 Stanley Cup playoffs in August, Talbot beat Rittich for the starting spot for the Flames' opening series against the Winnipeg Jets in the qualifying round. In game four of the best-of-five series, Talbot recorded a shutout to eliminate the Jets. However, in the following best-of-seven round against the Dallas Stars, the Flames were eliminated, despite Talbot posting another shutout in game three.

==== Minnesota Wild ====
On October 9, 2020, the opening day of free agency, Talbot left the Flames and agreed to a three-year deal worth $11 million to become the starting goaltender for the Minnesota Wild. He made his first appearance for the Wild during the pandemic-shortened 2020–21 regular season on January 14, 2021, in a 4–3 overtime victory over the Los Angeles Kings. He marked his first shutout with Minnesota on March 12 in a 4–0 win over the Arizona Coyotes. He finished with a 19–8–5 record in 33 appearances in his first campaign with the Wild, with a save percentage of .915 and a GAA of 2.63, leading them to a playoff spot. However, the Wild were eliminated in the first round of the 2021 playoffs by the Vegas Golden Knights. Talbot and young backup Kaapo Kähkönen played most of the 2021–22 season as the goalie tandem in Minnesota. Talbot was selected to appear in the 2022 NHL All-Star Game alongside teammate Kirill Kaprizov. However, at the trade deadline, the Wild traded out Kähkönen and acquired goaltender Marc-André Fleury to improve their depth in goal. Talbot finished the regular season with a record of 32–12–4 in 49 appearances, with a save percentage of .911 and a GAA of 2.76. Despite Talbot being the starter for the majority of the season, the Wild played Fleury through most of the first round playoff loss to the St. Louis Blues. Fleury, a pending free agent, re-signed with Minnesota in the offseason, allowing Wild general manager Bill Guerin to make Talbot available for trade despite stating that he intended to keep Talbot.

==== Ottawa Senators ====
On July 12, 2022, with a year remaining on his contract, Talbot was traded by the Wild to the Ottawa Senators in exchange for Filip Gustavsson. His Senators debut was delayed until November 3 when he relieved Anton Forsberg in the second period of a 5–4 loss to the Vegas Golden Knights. He missed the first nine games of the 2022–23 season with an injury. He made his first start for Ottawa in the next game on November 5, a 2–1 loss to the Philadelphia Flyers. On December 12, Talbot got his first shutout with his new team, making 32 saves in a 3–0 win over the Anaheim Ducks. On December 27, Talbot stopped 49 of 51 shots in a 3–2 shootout win over the Boston Bruins, setting the Senators team record for saves recorded in a win. However, Talbot suffered a sequence of injuries including a broken rib and a lower-body injury that kept him out of the lineup for three weeks. Despite plans by both Talbot and the Ottawa Senators for him to remain in Ottawa, a difference in contract length led Ottawa's general manager Pierre Dorion to announce in April 2023 that Talbot would not return with the team. He completed the season with a record of 17–14–2 in 36 appearances, with a save percentage of .898 and a GAA of 2.93.

==== Los Angeles Kings ====
At the opening of free agency on July 1, 2023, Talbot signed an incentive-laden, one-year, $2 million contract with the Los Angeles Kings. For the 2023–24 season, the Kings opted to go forward with a tandem of Talbot and Pheonix Copley in net, which was questioned based on Talbot's previous season in Ottawa. He made his Kings debut on October 11 in the season opener, a 5–2 loss to the Colorado Avalanche. On November 4, he marked his first shutout with the Kings in a 5–0 win over the Philadelphia Flyers. By December, Talbot was easing those doubts from the beginning of the season, and was selected to represent the Kings at the 2024 NHL All-Star Game in January 2026. However, after his selection, his play plummeted and the Kings struggled to remain in playoff contention. However, after the All-Star Game, his play picked up again and the Kings made the playoffs. Talbot appeared in 54 games in the regular season, posting a 27–20–6 record with a 2.50 GAA, a .913 save percentage, and three shutouts. The Kings were defeated by the Edmonton Oilers in five games in the first round of the playoffs. Talbot started the first three games of the series, was replaced partly through game three by David Rittich and backed up Rittich for games four and five. In the three games, he had a record of 1–2–0, with a save percentage of .861 and a GAA of 5.30.

==== Detroit Red Wings ====
On July 1, 2024, Talbot signed as a free agent to a two-year, $5 million contract with the Detroit Red Wings. He was brought in to augment the existing goaltending tandem of Alex Lyon and Ville Husso for the 2024–25 season. He made his debut in the season opener on October 10 versus the Pittsburgh Penguins, relieving Husso in the second period in a 6–3 loss. He started the next game on October 12 and recorded his first shutout with the team in a 3–0 victory over the Nashville Predators. On December 1, Talbot suffered a lower-body injury that caused him to miss time. He returned on December 12 in a 4–1 loss to the Philadelphia Flyers. By January 2025, the goaltending tandem was now a duo, with Talbot and Lyon sharing the duties. With his second shutout of the season, a 2–0 win against the Tampa Bay Lightning on January 25, 2025, he became the second goaltender in NHL history to record multiple shutouts with six different teams. He finished the season as the Red Wings' goaltending leader in games played (47), wins (21) save percentage (.901), shutouts (2), while sporting a GAA of 2.91 as the team failed to make the playoffs.

In the offseason, the Red Wings acquired John Gibson to become the team's new starting goaltender. From January 1, 2026, until the end of the season, he won only once in 14 games, as Gibson took the majority of the work. Talbot spent the majority of the season as Gibson's backup, infrequently playing. As a result, his stats declined across the board, with a 12–9–6 record, a 3.10 GAA, and a .886 save percentage in 33 appearances.

==== Columbus Blue Jackets ====
On September 14, 2026, Talbot signed a one-year, $950,000 contract with the Columbus Blue Jackets. Talbot debuted for Columbus on October 9, in turn becoming the first goaltender in NHL history to play for nine franchises. In his debut, he stopped 20 of 22 shots faced, as well as all three in the shootout, to defeat the Pittsburgh Penguins 3–2.

== International play ==
Medal record

Men's ice hockey

Representing Canada

World Championships
Gold medal – first place	2016 Russia	

World Junior A Challenge
Silver medal – second place	2006 Yorkton	

Talbot played in the 2016 World Championship as the starting goaltender for Canada. He led the team to its second straight gold medal at the tournament and tied a tournament record for shutouts with four.

== Personal life ==
Talbot married his wife Kelly in 2011, and they had twins in October 2016.

Dating back to his time with the New York Rangers, Talbot has worn masks bearing characters and imagery from the Ghostbusters movies, painted by artist David Gunnarsson. This design also developed the goaltender's identity into being known as "Goalbuster."'

When UAH's hockey program faced dissolution in 2020, Talbot raised over one million dollars in donations to keep it active. Supported by the donations, the program survived one more year before ending with the 2020–21 season.

== Career statistics ==
=== Regular season and playoffs ===
Bold indicates led league

			Regular season									Playoffs
Season	Team	League	GP	W	L	T/OT	MIN	GA	SO	GAA	SV%	GP	W	L	MIN	GA	SO	GAA	SV%
2004–05	Hamilton Red Wings	OPJHL	19	—	—	—	—	—	—	—	—	—	—	—	—	—	—	—	—
2005–06	Hamilton Red Wings	OPJHL	35	25	13	1	2,046	87	1	2.55	.908	14	8	6	903	52	1	3.46	.891
2006–07	Hamilton Red Wings	OPJHL	28	19	5	2	1,644	57	1	2.08	.918	19	13	6	1243	51	0	2.46	.923
2007–08	Alabama–Huntsville Chargers	CHA	13	1	10	0	583	45	0	4.63	.860	—	—	—	—	—	—	—	—
2008–09	Alabama–Huntsville Chargers	CHA	24	2	16	3	1,320	65	1	2.95	.907	—	—	—	—	—	—	—	—
2009–10	Alabama–Huntsville Chargers	CHA	33	12	18	3	1,958	85	1	2.61	.925	—	—	—	—	—	—	—	—
2009–10	Hartford Wolf Pack	AHL	1	0	0	0	19	3	0	9.70	.727	—	—	—	—	—	—	—	—
2010–11	Hartford Wolf Pack / CT Whale	AHL	22	11	9	2	1,308	62	2	2.84	.902	1	0	1	38	2	0	3.13	.917
2010–11	Greenville Road Warriors	ECHL	2	1	0	1	122	5	0	2.46	.921	—	—	—	—	—	—	—	—
2011–12	Connecticut Whale	AHL	33	14	15	1	1,865	81	4	2.61	.913	9	5	4	571	20	2	2.10	.939
2012–13	Connecticut Whale	AHL	55	25	28	1	3,105	136	2	2.63	.918	—	—	—	—	—	—	—	—
2013–14	Hartford Wolf Pack	AHL	5	4	0	1	314	13	0	2.49	.924	—	—	—	—	—	—	—	—
2013–14	New York Rangers	NHL	21	12	6	1	1,211	33	3	1.64	.941	2	0	1	46	2	0	2.61	.846
2014–15	New York Rangers	NHL	36	21	9	4	2,095	77	5	2.21	.926	—	—	—	—	—	—	—	—
2015–16	Edmonton Oilers	NHL	56	21	**27**	5	3,223	137	3	2.55	.917	—	—	—	—	—	—	—	—
2016–17	Edmonton Oilers	NHL	**73**	**42**	22	8	**4,294**	**171**	7	2.39	.919	13	7	6	800	33	2	2.48	.924
2017–18	Edmonton Oilers	NHL	**67**	31	**31**	3	3,731	**188**	1	3.02	.908	—	—	—	—	—	—	—	—
2018–19	Edmonton Oilers	NHL	31	10	15	3	1,695	95	1	3.36	.893	—	—	—	—	—	—	—	—
2018–19	Philadelphia Flyers	NHL	4	1	2	0	211	13	0	3.70	.881	—	—	—	—	—	—	—	—
2019–20	Calgary Flames	NHL	26	12	10	1	1,435	63	2	2.63	.919	10	5	4	596	24	2	2.42	.924
2020–21	Minnesota Wild	NHL	33	19	8	5	1,961	86	2	2.63	.915	7	3	4	416	17	2	2.45	.923
2021–22	Minnesota Wild	NHL	49	32	12	4	2,865	132	3	2.77	.911	1	0	1	58	4	0	4.14	.846
2022–23	Ottawa Senators	NHL	36	17	14	2	1,947	95	1	2.93	.898	—	—	—	—	—	—	—	—
2023–24	Los Angeles Kings	NHL	54	27	20	6	3,116	130	3	2.50	.913	3	1	2	181	16	0	5.30	.861
2024–25	Detroit Red Wings	NHL	47	21	19	5	2,642	128	2	2.91	.901	—	—	—	—	—	—	—	—
2025–26	Detroit Red Wings	NHL	34	12	9	6	1,750	93	0	3.19	.883	—	—	—	—	—	—	—	—
NHL totals			567	278	204	53	32,174	1,441	33	2.69	.911	36	16	18	2,096	96	6	2.75	.915

=== International ===
Year	Team	Event	Result	GP	W	L	T	MIN	GA	SO	GAA	SV%
2006	Canada East	WJAC	2nd place, silver medalist(s)	4	3	1	0	240	7	0	1.75	.916
2016	Canada	WC	1st place, gold medalist(s)	8	7	1	0	480	10	4	1.25	.940
2026	Canada	WC	4th	2	2	0	0	120	5	1	2.50	.868
Junior totals				4	3	1	0	240	7	0	1.75	.916
Senior totals				10	9	1	0	600	15	5	1.50	.927

== Awards and honours ==
Award	Year	Ref
College
All-CHA Second Team	2010	
CHA Most Valuable Player in Tournament	2010	
NHL
All-Star Game	2022, 2024	
New York Rangers
Steven McDonald Extra Effort Award	2015	

== Records ==
=== Edmonton Oilers ===
- Most wins in a season: 42 (2016–17)

== Sources ==
- Chaimovitch, Jason, ed. (2025). 2025–2026 American Hockey League Official Guide & Record Book. Springfield, Massachusetts: American Hockey League. OCLC 22147888.

Awards and achievements
Preceded by Matt Read	CHA Most Valuable Player in Tournament; 2010	Succeeded by award discontinued
