= 2008 World U-17 Hockey Challenge =

The 2008 World U-17 Hockey Challenge was an ice hockey tournament held in London, Lucan, St. Thomas, Stratford, Strathroy, and Woodstock, Ontario, Canada between December 29, 2007 and January 4, 2008. The venues used for the tournament included the John Labatt Centre and Western Fair Sports Centre in London, the Lucan Community Memorial Centre in Lucan, the Gemini Sportsplex in Strathroy, the Timken Community Complex in St. Thomas, the Rotary Complex in Stratford, and the Southwood Community Complex in Woodstock. Team Canada Ontario defeated the United States 3–0 to win the gold medal, while team Canada West defeated team Canada Pacific 9–6 to win the bronze medal.

== Challenge results ==
=== Preliminary round ===
==== Group A ====
Team	Pld	W	OTW	OTL	L	GF	GA	GD	Pts
Canada Ontario	4	4	0	0	0	23	9	+14	12
Canada Pacific	4	2	0	1	1	17	14	+3	7
Finland	4	2	0	0	2	22	22	0	6
Canada Quebec	4	1	1	0	2	16	16	0	5
Slovakia	4	0	0	0	4	10	27	−17	0

===== Results =====
December 29, 2007	Finland	8–5	Canada Quebec	Lucan Memorial Centre, Lucan; Attendance: 750

T. Kivistö (PP) 20:47; E. Haula (ES) 27:24; T. Pulkkinen (ES) 28:03; T. Rajala (ES) 45:50; T. Pulkkinen (ES) 47:13; T. Rajala (ES) 48:18; J. Laaksonen (ES) 53:39; T. Pulkkinen (ES) 59:33 / Goals / 06:30 (ES) L. Leblanc; 25:20 (ES) É. Brodeur; 36:50 (ES) M. Gingras; 38:53 (ES) C-O. Roussel; 54:34 (ES) L. Leblanc

December 29, 2007	Canada Ontario	4–2	Canada Pacific	John Labatt Centre, London

R. Ellis (ES) 14:17; T. Hall (PP) 17:10; A. Agozzino (ES) 35:26; A. Agozzino (ES) 50:48 / Goals / 42:51 (ES) E. Kane; 53:32 (ES) D. Wagner

December 30, 2007	Slovakia	2–6	Canada Pacific	Gemini Sportsplex, Strathroy; Attendance: 550

J. Majadan (ES) 15:50; M. Preisinger (PP) 38:49 / Goals / 16:55 (PP) R. Howse; 32:01 (PP) L. Ferraro; 32:55 (ES) J. Maylan; 38:06 (ES) C. Schaber; 43:33 (PP) B. Silvester; 50:21 (ES) B. Silvester

December 30, 2007	Canada Ontario	8–1	Finland	John Labatt Centre, London

M. Duchene (ES) 06:10; T. Hall (PP) 10:13; M. Duchene (ES) 15:33; R. Martindale (ES) 23:20; A. Agozzino (ES) 30:34; C. Cizikas (PP) 41:03; T. Randell (ES) 47:30; Z. Kassian (ES) 55:08 / Goals / 49:09 (SH) T. Pulkkinen

December 31, 2007	Canada Ontario	4–2	Canada Quebec	John Labatt Centre, London

C. Kennedy (ES) 28:00; J. Hishon (ES) 45:43; C. Cizikas (ES) 55:28; C. Cizikas (SH) 59:33 / Goals / 09:44 (ES) M. Gingras; 50:53 (PS) D. Gilbert

December 31, 2007	Finland	9–3	Slovakia	Southwood Community Complex, Woodstock

J. Laaksonen (ES) 01:06; T. Pulkkinen (ES) 13:55; J. Donskoi (ES) 15:40; E. Haula (ES) 27:32; M. Granlund (ES) 30:22; T. Rajala (ES) 48:40; J. Nattinen (ES) 49:26; J. Karjalainen (ES) 49:53; S. Vatanen (ES) 55:24 / Goals / 04:09 (ES) D. Bortňák; 16:16 (ES) J. Kentos; 44:53 (ES) D. Bortňák

January 1, 2008	Canada Pacific	6–4	Finland	Rotary Complex, Stratford; Attendance: 900

E. Kane (ES) 04:18; J. Maylan (ES) 08:22; C. Schaber (ES) 09:30; E. Kane (ES) 32:20; E. Kane (ES) 39:59; S. Oursov (ES) 44:49 / Goals / 36:11 (PP) M. Aaltonen; 38:49 (ES) J. Nattinen; 48:04 (ES) L. Karmrniemi; 57:48 (PP) T. Rajala

January 1, 2008	Canada Quebec	5–1	Slovakia	John Labatt Centre, London

L. Leblanc (PP) 06:16; P. Lefebvre (ES) 13:11; M. Tam (ES) 13:58; D. Gilbert (PS) 39:57; R. Kavanagh (ES) 43:36 / Goals / 52:24 (ES) J. Majadan

January 2, 2008	Slovakia	4–7	Canada Ontario	John Labatt Centre, London

M. Hrivík (ES) 10:44; A. Šťastný (PP) 17:28; A. Potičný (PP) 44:43; M. Preisinger (PP) 45:35 / Goals / 05:48 (ES) A. Agozzino; 13:38 (PP) J. Hishon; 27:25 (PP) P. Holland; 35:19 (ES) P. Holland; 37:27 (PP) M. Duchene; 51:31 (PP) Z. Kassian; 57:54 (ES) A. Agozzino

January 2, 2008	Canada Pacific	3–4 (OT)	Canada Quebec	Timken Community Complex, St. Thomas; Attendance: 1,460

J. Maylan (ES) 00:29; T. Barrie (ES) 59:09; C. Schaber (ES) 59:29 / Goals / 16:30 (SH) G. Pelletier; 23:32 (ES) J. Esposito; 32:13 (ES) G. Fournier; 61:32 (PP) G. Fournier

==== Group B ====
Team	Pld	W	OTW	OTL	L	GF	GA	GD	Pts
United States	4	3	0	0	1	23	10	+13	9
Canada West	4	3	0	0	1	18	14	+4	9
Russia	4	2	0	0	2	16	13	+3	6
Canada Atlantic	4	1	0	0	3	8	21	−13	3
Germany	4	1	0	0	3	10	17	−7	3

===== Results =====
December 29, 2007	Canada Atlantic	0–8	United States	John Labatt Centre, London

Goals / 01:28 (SH) A. J. Treais; 06:43 (ES) S. Calabrese; 23:32 (ES) J. Morin; 24:35 (ES) K. Palmieri; 25:33 (ES) S. Whitney; 28:29 (PP) J. Morin; 28:57 (ES) J. D'Amigo; 38:33 (ES) K. Lynch

December 29, 2007	Germany	2–3	Canada West	Lucan Memorial Centre, Lucan; Attendance: 900

M. Kohl (ES) 01:54; A. Baumer (ES) 30:01 / Goals / 04:41 (ES) M. Wilgosh; 31:26 (ES) J. Bubnick; 33:36 (ES) B. Schenn

December 30, 2007	Canada West	7–4	Canada Atlantic	John Labatt Centre, London

J. Bubnick (ES) 05:05; M. Wilgosh (ES) 08:09; S. Glennie (PP) 13:42; B. Schenn (PP) 17:03; J. Henry (ES) 20:31; J. Bubnick (PP) 32:33; S. Glennie (EN) 59:52 / Goals / 00:14 (ES) B. Gormley; 02:31 (PP) D. MacAusland; 25:07 (PP) S. Anthony; 47:46 (ES) S. Walker

December 30, 2007	Russia	2–6	United States	Gemini Sportsplex, Strathroy; Attendance: 925

S. Chvanov (ES) 20:47; M. Kitsin (ES) 30:16 / Goals / 04:00 (SH) D. Shore; 06:08 (ES) S. Whitney; 07:13 (ES) J. Morin; 27:50 (SH) R. Bourque; 49:17 (PP) J. D'Amigo; 50:03 (ES) A. J. Treais

December 31, 2007	Germany	2–9	Russia	Western Fair Sports Centre, London

M. Kohl (ES) 19:42; R. Bernegger (ES) 43:03 / Goals / 09:50 (ES) D. Orlov; 12:48 (ES) S. Chvanov; 13:42 (ES) K. Kabanov; 31:57 (ES) D. Sobchenko; 32:50 (ES) D. Sobchenko; 35:59 (ES) M. Kitsin; 39:24 (ES) D. Sobchenko; 51:16 (ES) D. Orlov; 56:50 (ES) S. Chvanov

December 31, 2007	Canada West	4–7	United States	Southwood Community Complex, Woodstock

S. Glennie (EN) 10:30; B. Schenn (ES) 28:12; B. Schenn (ES) 32:48; B. Schenn (ES) 34:59 / Goals / 22:23 (EN) K. Palmieri; 35:20 (ES) J. Morin; 38:11 (ES) C. Brown; 42:57 (ES) K. Lynch; 44:52 (ES) R. Bourque; 47:20 (ES) J. Morin; 52:56 (ES) K. Ryan

January 1, 2008	United States	2–4	Germany	John Labatt Centre, London

J. Morin (ES) 16:22; C. Brown (ES) 29:02 / Goals / 15:05 (ES) T. Kühnhackl; 43:22 (ES) M. Habermann; 53:34 (SH) N. Hauner; 59:13 (EN) T. Kühnhackl

January 1, 2008	Canada Atlantic	2–5	Russia	Rotary Complex, Stratford

D. MacAusland (ES) 27:16; S. Anthony (PP) 46:23 / Goals / 26:24 (ES) V. Malinovsky; 44:59 (ES) A. Burdasov; 51:51 (ES) D. Orlov; 53:35 (ES) S. Bocharov; 59:31 (ES) A. Burmistrov

January 2, 2008	Russia	1–4	Canada West	John Labatt Centre, London

A. Burmistrov (ES) 11:58 / Goals / 14:10 (PP) G. Mitchell; 20:26 (ES) G. Mitchell; 31:12 (PP) J. Bubnick; 42:29 (PP) S. Glennie

January 2, 2008	Germany	2–3	Canada Atlantic	Timken Community Complex, St. Thomas

M. Kohl (ES) 34:05; M. Plachta (PP) 57:24 / Goals / 12:54 (PP) J. Costello; 48:57 (ES) S. Anthony; 54:42 (PP) M. Brown

=== Final round ===
Semifinals
A1	Canada Ontario	4
B2	Canada West	3
B1	United States	3
A2	Canada Pacific	2

Final
SF1	Canada Ontario	3
SF2	United States	0

==== Semifinals ====
January 3, 2008	Canada Ontario	4–3	Canada West	John Labatt Centre, London

P. Holland (ES) 05:58; T. Hall (ES) 06:41; D. Maggio (ES) 21:06; C. Cizikas (PP) 25:17 / Goals / 04:43 (SH) J. Henry; 29:22 (ES) A. Hughesman; 59:23 (ES) A. Hughesman

January 3, 2008	United States	3–2	Canada Pacific	John Labatt Centre, London; Attendance: 492

Z. Golembiewski (ES) 11:31; D. Shore (ES) 19:09; K. Lynch (ES) 41:03 / Goals / 37:14 (PP) C. Schaber; 59:35 (PP) R. Howse

==== 9th place game ====
January 3, 2008	Germany	5–1	Slovakia	Lucan Memorial Centre, Lucan

M. Plachta (ES) 22:33; T. Kühnhackl (PP) 30:18; B. Keil (ES) 31:07; T. Kühnhackl (ES) 41:15; L. Braun (ES) 58:26 / Goals / 49:59 (ES) M. Hrivík

==== 7th place game ====
January 3, 2008	Canada Quebec	3–1	Canada Atlantic	Gemini Sportsplex, Strathroy; Attendance: 678

D. Gilbert (ES) 22:01; J. Esposito Jr. (ES) 37:32; É. Brodeur (ES) 58:59 / Goals / 31:59 (SH) T. Randell

==== 5th place game ====
January 3, 2008	Russia	5–4	Finland	Timken Community Complex, St. Thomas; Attendance: 1,080

A. Marchenko (ES) 01:26; S. Bocharov (ES) 09:19; K. Kabanov (ES) 21:50; V. Malinovsky (ES) 26:03; S. Valuyskiy (PP) 39:36 / Goals / 07:29 (ES) T. Rajala; 14:10 (ES) T. Rajala; 24:43 (PP) T. Kivistö; 51:57 (PP) S. Vatanen

==== Bronze medal game ====
January 4, 2008	Canada West	9–6	Canada Pacific	John Labatt Centre, London

B. Herrod (ES) 07:47; G. Mitchell (ES) 20:15; B. Schenn (ES) 24:39; G. Mitchell (ES) 30:14; J. Bubnick (ES) 32:13; J. Gardiner (PP) 34:01; J. Bubnick (SH) 38:12; J. Gardiner (PP) 46:09; C. Ashton (ES) 47:46 / Goals / 10:09 (ES) L. Ferraro; 25:21 (ES) C. Jardine; 35:43 (PP) J. Maylan; 44:05 (PP) B. Yadlowski; 51:43 (ES) K. Tochkin; 54:14 (ES) M. Burns

==== Gold medal game ====
January 4, 2008	Canada Ontario	3–0	United States	John Labatt Centre, London; Attendance: 8,889

T. Hall (ES) 12:56; P. Holland (ES) 27:24; M. Duchene (ES) 30:37 / Goals

=== Final standings ===
	Team
1st place, gold medalist(s)	Canada Ontario
2nd place, silver medalist(s)	United States
3rd place, bronze medalist(s)	Canada West
4	Canada Pacific
5	Russia
6	Finland
7	Canada Quebec
8	Canada Atlantic
9	Germany
10	Slovakia

== Scoring leaders ==
Player	Country	GP	G	A	Pts	PIM
Brayden Schenn	Canada West	6	6	7	13	4
Jimmy Bubnick	Canada West	6	6	6	12	4
Toni Rajala	Finland	5	6	5	11	6
Kirill Kabanov	Russia	5	2	9	11	28
Matt Duchene	Canada Ontario	6	4	6	10	8
Scott Glennie	Canada West	6	4	6	10	2
Erik Haula	Finland	5	2	8	10	18
Casey Cizikas	Canada Ontario	6	4	5	9	0
Dmitry Orlov	Russia	5	2	7	9	6
Ryan Ellis	Canada Ontario	6	1	8	9	8

== Goaltending leaders ==
(Minimum 60 minutes played)

Player	Country	MINS	GA	Sv%	GAA	SO
Bryce O'Hagan	Canada Ontario	60	0	1.000	0.00	1
Brandon Maxwell	United States	300	11	.914	2.20	1
Michael Zador	Canada Ontario	300	12	.895	2.40	0
Maxime Clermont	Canada Quebec	241	13	.906	3.24	0
Philipp Grubauer	Germany	275	16	.909	3.49	0

== Tournament awards ==
=== All-Star team ===
- Goaltender: (Germany) Philipp Grubauer
- Defensemen: (Canada) Ontario Ryan Ellis, (United States) Cam Fowler
- Forwards: (Canada) Ontario Matt Duchene, (Finland) Toni Rajala, (Canada) West Brayden Schenn

== See also ==
- 2008 IIHF World U18 Championships
- 2008 World Junior Ice Hockey Championships
