= Scott Glennie =

Canadian ice hockey player (born 1991)

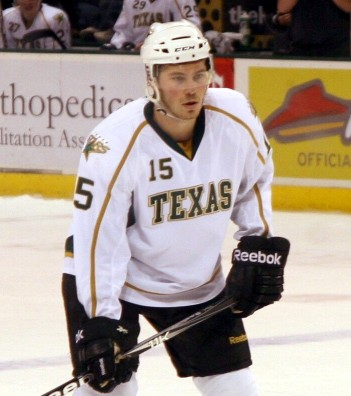
- Glennie with the Texas Stars in 2012
- Born: February 22, 1991 (age 35) Winnipeg, Manitoba, Canada
- Height: 6 ft 1 in (185 cm)
- Weight: 185 lb (84 kg; 13 st 3 lb)
- Position: Right wing
- Shot: Right
- Played for: Dallas Stars
- NHL draft: 8th overall, 2009; Dallas Stars
- Playing career: 2011–2017

Scott Glennie (born February 22, 1991) is a Canadian former professional ice hockey forward. Glennie was drafted in the first round, 8th overall, by the Dallas Stars in the 2009 National Hockey League (NHL) Entry Draft. However, he would end up playing just one single game at the NHL level in six professional seasons. Prior to turning professional, Glennie played for the Brandon Wheat Kings of the Western Hockey League.

== Playing career ==
=== Amateur ===
Glennie was drafted by the Brandon Wheat Kings in the second round, 29th overall in the 2006 Western Hockey League (WHL) Bantam Draft. He played his last season of minor hockey with the Winnipeg Wild of the Manitoba Midget Hockey League. In his rookie season with the team in 2007–08, Glennie had the third highest goal total on the club, scoring 26 goals, while finishing with the fifth highest point total at 58. In the playoffs, Glennie scored one goal in six games as Brandon was eliminated in the first round of the playoffs. In his second year in Brandon, Glennie would miss fifteen games due to injuries, however, he would improve his numbers from his rookie season, as Glennie scored 28 goals and 70 points, once again finishing fifth in team scoring. Glennie would have an impressive playoff performance, tying Brayden Schenn in team scoring with 18 points in 12 post-season games. Glennie was a highly ranked prospect heading into the 2009 NHL entry draft, ending up ranked 7th among all North American skaters by the NHL's Central Scouting Bureau. He was drafted in the first round, 8th overall by the Dallas Stars.

=== Professional ===
On July 13, 2010, Glennie was signed to a three-year entry-level contract with the Stars. After his season with Brandon was over, Glennie joined the Texas Stars of the American Hockey League (AHL) for the final few games and playoffs of the 2010–11 AHL season, playing in four games and recording no points. Glennie made his National Hockey League (NHL) debut during the 2011–12 season with the Dallas Stars. He played in a single game, without recording any points. With the exception of his one game at the NHL level, Glennie had spent his entire professional career with the Texas Stars until the end of the 2014–15 season. During the 2013-14 AHL season, Glennie scored a career-high 15 goals and 28 points in the regular season, along with 10 points (six goals, four assists) in the postseason en route to the Stars' Calder Cup Championship run. This led to a one-year contract renewal.

At the conclusion of the 2014–15 season and only having played one regular season game with Dallas, the Stars announced they would not renew his contract. Scott Glennie is commonly referred to as one of the Top 15 bust since the Hockey Lockout.

After sitting out the entirety of the 2015–16 season as a free agent in order to fully recuperate from injury, Glennie accepted an invite to try out with hometown club, the Manitoba Moose on September 21, 2016. After a successful training camp with the Moose, Glennie resumed his professional career in signing a one-year deal on October 14, 2016.

== Personal life ==
Glennie learned how to skate when he was three years old, and began playing organized hockey when he was four. Growing up, his hockey hero was Mario Lemieux. During the off-season prior to the 2013–14 season, Glennie spent time training with former Stars Brent Severyn and Ulf Dahlen to improve his chances of playing at the NHL level. In 2022-23 he coached HC Edmonton in the JPHL to second in the Alberta division

== Career statistics ==
=== Regular season and playoffs ===
			Regular season					Playoffs
Season	Team	League	GP	G	A	Pts	PIM	GP	G	A	Pts	PIM
2006–07	Winnipeg Wild AAA	MMHL	38	31	37	69	64	7	3	3	6	16
2007–08	Brandon Wheat Kings	WHL	61	26	32	58	50	6	1	0	1	7
2008–09	Brandon Wheat Kings	WHL	55	28	42	70	85	12	3	15	18	1
2009–10	Brandon Wheat Kings	WHL	66	32	57	89	50	15	3	7	10	14
2010–11	Brandon Wheat Kings	WHL	70	35	56	91	58	6	3	7	10	6
2010–11	Texas Stars	AHL	4	0	0	0	2	6	1	0	1	2
2011–12	Texas Stars	AHL	70	12	25	37	26	—	—	—	—	—
2011–12	Dallas Stars	NHL	1	0	0	0	2	—	—	—	—	—
2012–13	Texas Stars	AHL	37	5	9	14	10	9	0	0	0	8
2013–14	Texas Stars	AHL	50	15	13	28	14	20	6	4	10	18
2014–15	Texas Stars	AHL	69	14	25	39	47	3	1	0	1	0
2016–17	Manitoba Moose	AHL	45	7	13	20	34	—	—	—	—	—
AHL totals			275	53	85	138	133	38	8	4	12	28
NHL totals			1	0	0	0	2	—	—	—	—	—

Medal record

Representing Canada

Ice hockey

World U-17 Hockey Challenge
Bronze medal – third place	2008 Canada	

=== International ===
Year	Team	Event	Result	GP	G	A	Pts	PIM
2008	Canada Western	U17	3rd place, bronze medalist(s)	6	4	6	10	2
2008	Canada	IH18	1st place, gold medalist(s)	4	2	1	3	2
Junior totals				10	6	7	13	4

== Awards and honours ==
Award	Year
AHL
Calder Cup (Texas Stars)	2014

Awards and achievements
Preceded by Ivan Vishnevskiy	Dallas Stars first-round draft pick 2009	Succeeded by Jack Campbell
