= Toni Rajala =

Finnish ice hockey player

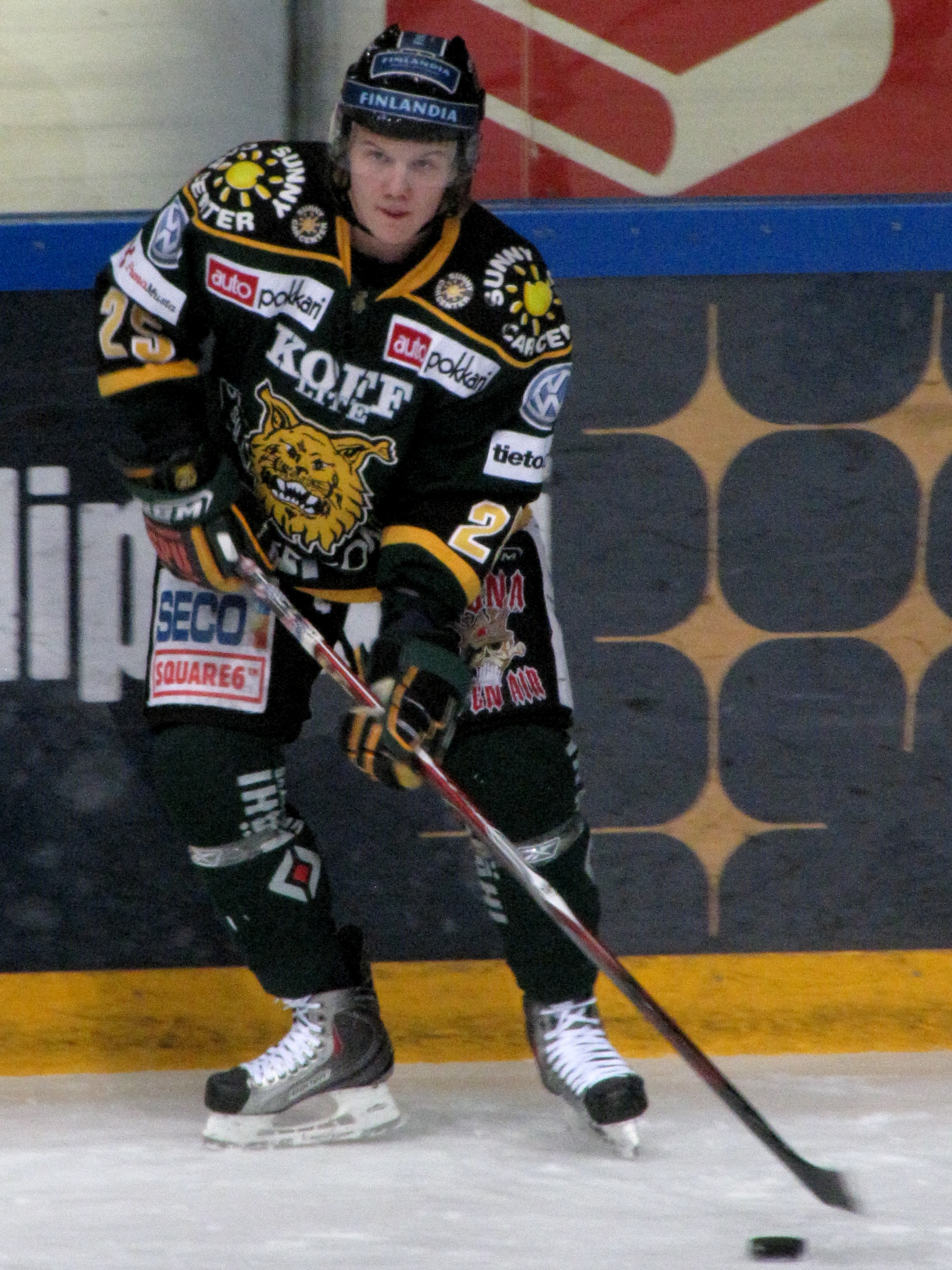
- Rajala in 2011
- Born: March 29, 1991 (age 35) Parkano, Finland
- Height: 5 ft 10 in (178 cm)
- Weight: 168 lb (76 kg; 12 st 0 lb)
- Position: Right wing
- Shoots: Left
- NL team Former teams: EHC Biel; Ilves; Oklahoma City Barons; HV71; HC Ugra; Färjestad BK; Luleå HF
- National team: Finland
- NHL draft: 101st overall, 2009; Edmonton Oilers
- Playing career: 2008–present

Toni Rajala (born March 29, 1991) is a Finnish professional ice hockey forward for EHC Biel of the National League (NL). He was drafted 101st overall by the Edmonton Oilers in the 2009 NHL entry draft.

== Playing career ==
Rajala began playing junior hockey with the Ilves Tampere system in 2005–06. By 2007–08, he had worked his way up to the Junior A level of the SM-Liiga, tallying 35 points in 33 games. Rajala turned pro with Ilves Tampere in 2008–09, tallying 5 points in 21 games during his professional rookie season in the SM-Liiga.

Rajala was selected in the first round of the 2009 CHL Import Draft (14th overall) by the Brandon Wheat Kings of the Western Hockey League (WHL). He joined the Wheat Kings for the 2009–10 WHL season.

On July 16, 2009, Rajala signed a two-way contract with the Edmonton Oilers.

With the impending 2012–13 NHL lockout, The Oilers directly assigned him to the Oklahoma City Barons of the American Hockey League on September 15, 2012.

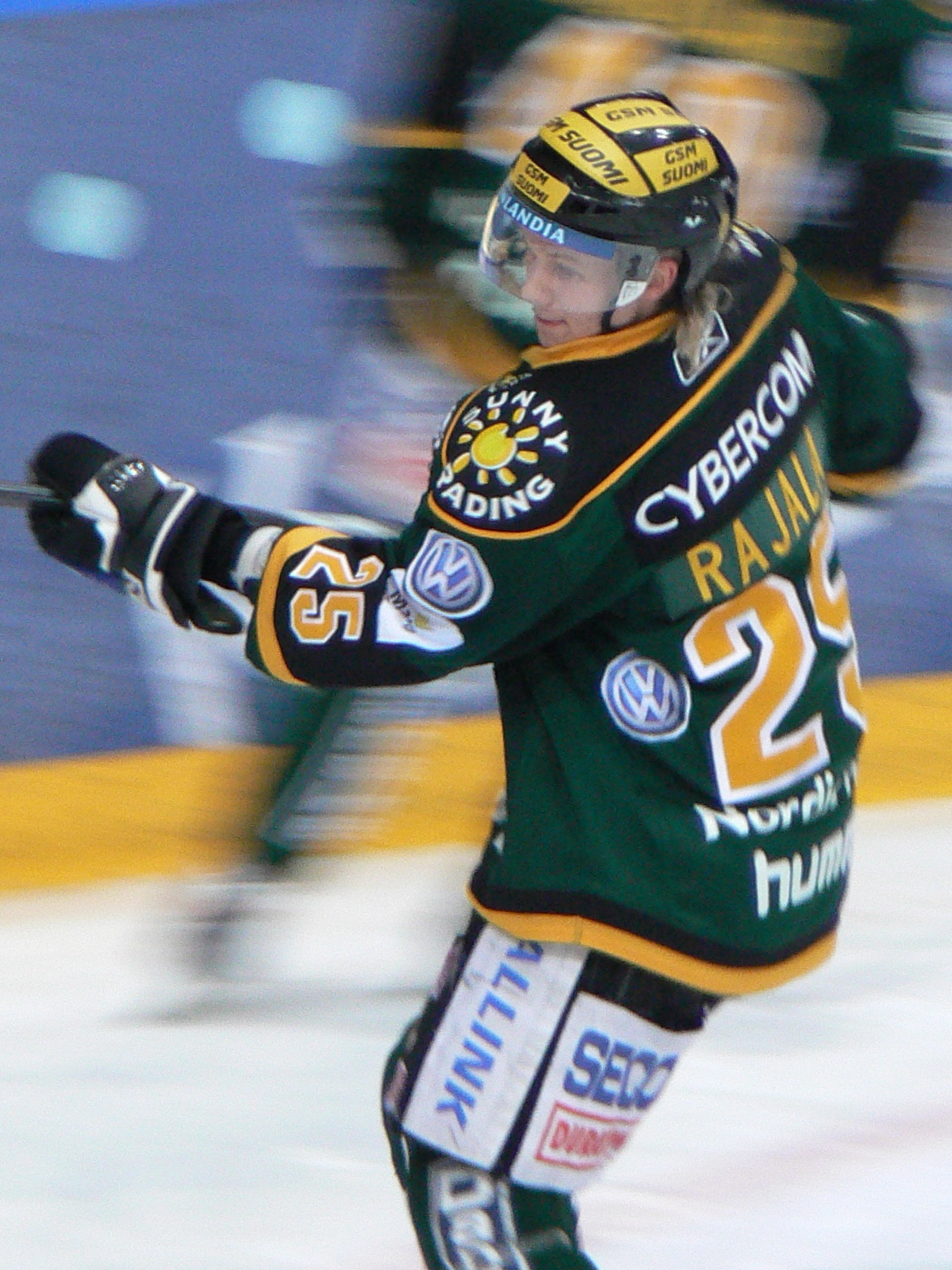
Toni Rajala playing for Ilves in 2009.

On August 25, 2013, with the prospects of another season in the American minor leagues, Rajala opted to be mutually released from his contract with the Oilers and later returned to Europe to sign a one-year contract with Swedish Hockey League club, HV71 on October 15, 2013.

== International play ==
Medal record

Representing Finland

Ice hockey

Olympic Games
Gold medal – first place	2022 Beijing	

World Championships
Gold medal – first place	2019 Slovakia	
Gold medal – first place	2022 Finland	

IIHF World U18 Championships
Bronze medal – third place	2009 United States	

Rajala debuted internationally for Finland at the 2008 IIHF World U18 Championships, recording 5 points in 6 games as Finland placed sixth. The following year, he was named to Finland's under-20 team for the 2009 World Junior Championships in Ottawa, Ontario, Canada, and managed 3 points in 6 games; Finland finished in seventh place.

Later that year, in April 2009, Rajala competed for Finland at the 2009 IIHF World U18 Championships in the United States. He led the tournament in scoring with ten goals and nine assists and broke the previous point record held by Alexander Ovechkin. Rajala was selected as the best forward in the tournament, and was named to the tournament All-Star Team, helping Finland to a bronze medal. Rajala also represented Finland at the 2010 World Junior Championships, which were held in Saskatchewan, Canada.

== Career statistics ==
=== Regular season and playoffs ===
			Regular season					Playoffs
Season	Team	League	GP	G	A	Pts	PIM	GP	G	A	Pts	PIM
2006–07	Ilves	FIN U18	30	18	26	44	32	—	—	—	—	—
2006–07	Ilves	Jr. A	1	0	0	0	0	—	—	—	—	—
2007–08	Ilves	FIN U18	13	10	15	25	18	—	—	—	—	—
2007–08	Ilves	Jr. A	33	13	22	35	10	5	1	3	4	8
2008–09	Ilves	Jr. A	31	14	17	31	18	—	—	—	—	—
2008–09	Ilves	SM-l	21	2	3	5	0	3	0	0	0	2
2008–09	Suomi U20	Mestis	4	1	2	3	2	—	—	—	—	—
2009–10	Brandon Wheat Kings	WHL	60	26	37	63	24	15	4	3	7	8
2010–11	Ilves	SM-l	44	9	13	22	4	6	4	0	4	0
2010–11	Suomi U20	Mestis	2	0	1	1	0	—	—	—	—	—
2010–11	LeKi	Mestis	1	0	0	0	0	—	—	—	—	—
2011–12	Ilves	SM-l	51	16	13	29	24	—	—	—	—	—
2012–13	Stockton Thunder	ECHL	29	18	20	38	10	—	—	—	—	—
2012–13	Oklahoma City Barons	AHL	46	17	28	45	16	17	4	12	16	8
2013–14	HV71	SHL	37	13	17	30	12	7	1	4	5	4
2014–15	HC Yugra	KHL	21	3	9	12	6	—	—	—	—	—
2014–15	Färjestad BK	SHL	31	14	13	27	12	3	0	2	2	0
2015–16	Luleå HF	SHL	52	17	15	32	8	11	0	2	2	6
2016–17	EHC Biel	NLA	36	16	8	24	14	5	2	3	5	2
2017–18	EHC Biel	NL	44	16	19	35	8	12	9	5	14	0
2018–19	EHC Biel	NL	50	27	21	48	36	12	5	1	6	2
2019–20	EHC Biel	NL	50	23	23	46	10	—	—	—	—	—
2020–21	EHC Biel	NL	46	12	20	32	22	2	0	0	0	0
2021–22	EHC Biel	NL	51	22	26	48	10	7	2	3	5	4
2022–23	EHC Biel	NL	51	16	22	38	18	17	10	5	15	2
2023–24	EHC Biel	NL	51	18	22	40	41	8	1	1	2	6
2024–25	EHC Biel	NL	49	17	19	36	30	—	—	—	—	—
2025–26	EHC Biel	NL	49	14	19	33	4	2	1	0	1	0
Liiga totals			116	27	29	56	28	9	4	0	4	2
NL totals			477	181	199	380	193	65	30	18	48	16

=== International ===
Year	Team	Event	Result	GP	G	A	Pts	PIM
2008	Finland	U17	6th	5	6	5	11	6
2008	Finland	WJC18	6th	6	3	2	5	2
2009	Finland	WJC	7th	6	2	1	3	4
2009	Finland	WJC18	3rd place, bronze medalist(s)	6	10	9	19	6
2010	Finland	WJC	5th	6	1	2	3	0
2011	Finland	WJC	6th	6	0	4	4	2
2019	Finland	WC	1st place, gold medalist(s)	10	1	4	5	2
2022	Finland	OG	1st place, gold medalist(s)	1	0	0	0	0
2022	Finland	WC	1st place, gold medalist(s)	10	4	2	6	0
Junior totals				35	22	23	45	20
Senior totals				21	5	6	11	2

== Awards and honours ==
Award	Year
CHL
George Parsons Trophy	2010
IIHF
U18 Best Forward	2009
U18 All-Star Team	2009
