= Garrett Mitchell (ice hockey) =

Canadian ice hockey player (born 1991)

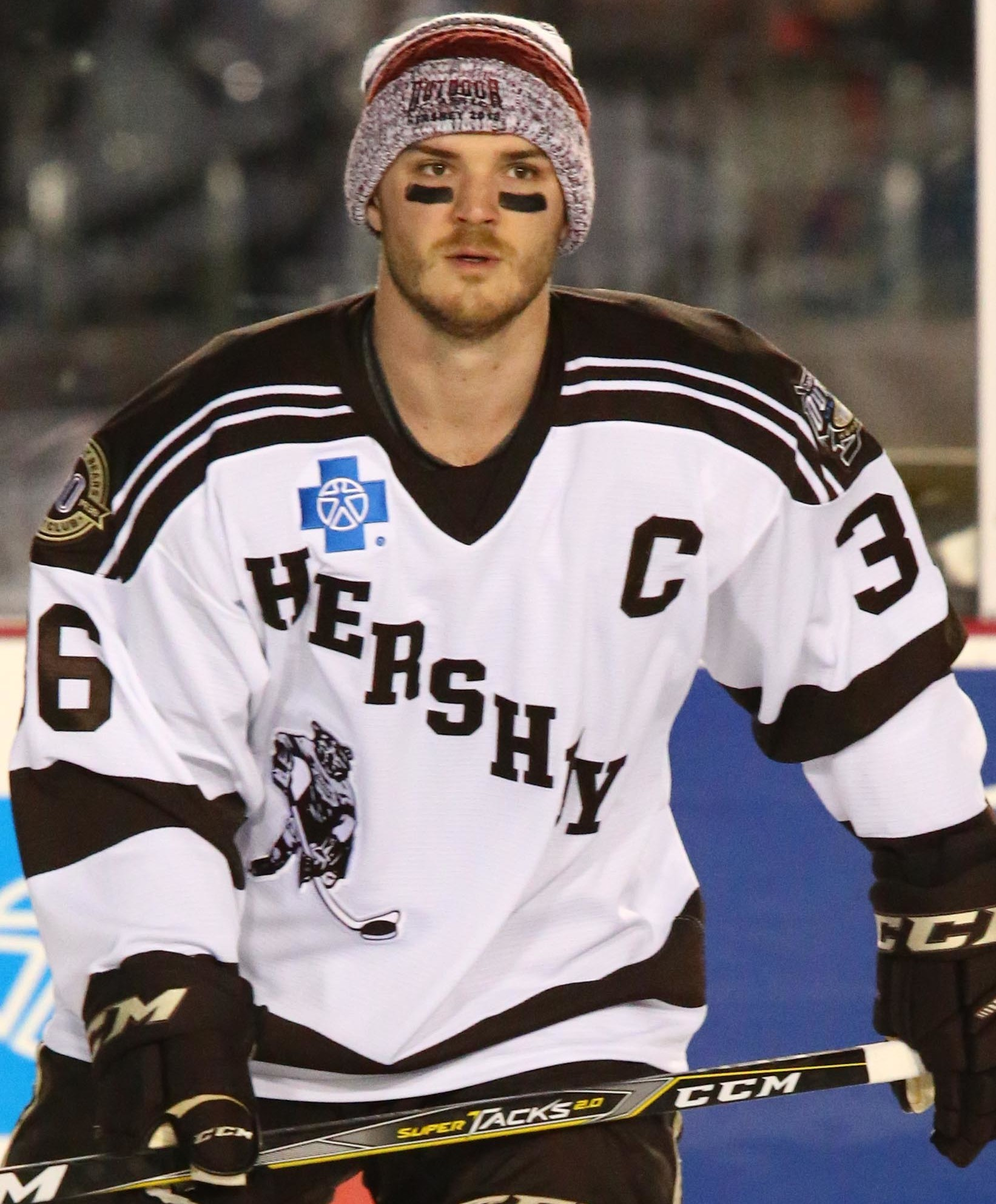
- Mitchell with the Hershey Bears in 2018
- Born: September 2, 1991 (age 35) Regina, Saskatchewan, Canada
- Height: 5 ft 11 in (180 cm)
- Weight: 195 lb (88 kg; 13 st 13 lb)
- Position: Right wing
- Shot: Right
- Played for: Washington Capitals; HKm Zvolen
- NHL draft: 175th overall, 2009; Washington Capitals
- Playing career: 2011–2023

Garrett Mitchell (born September 2, 1991) is a Canadian former professional ice hockey forward who only appeared in one National Hockey League (NHL) game with the Washington Capitals. Mitchell spent the most of his professional career playing in American Hockey League (AHL). He was selected in the sixth round 175th overall by the Capitals in the 2009 NHL entry draft. He is currently the color commentator for the Hershey Bears on Fox 43 TV broadcasts, working alongside the Voice of the Bears, Zack Fisch.

== Playing career ==
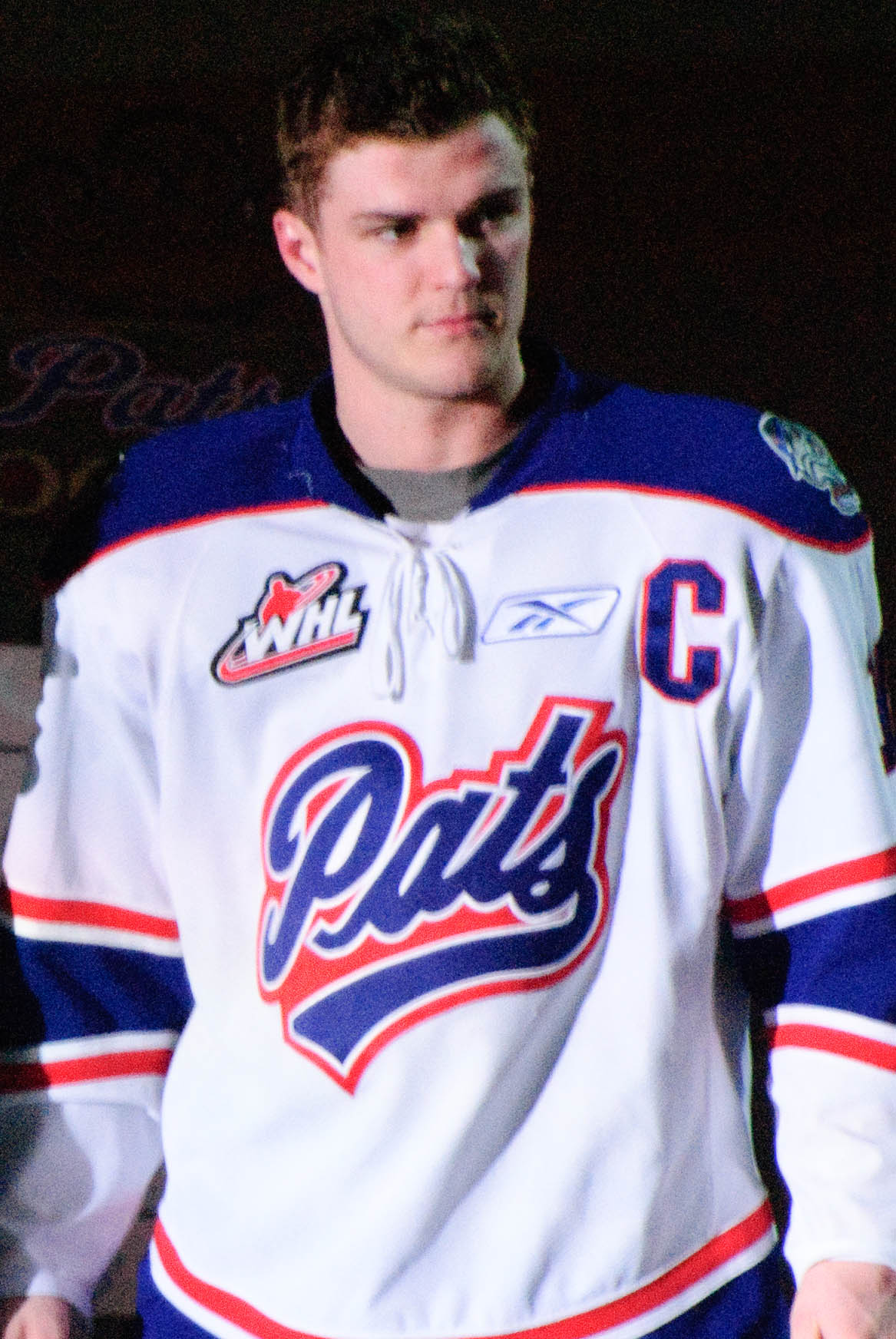
Mitchell with the Regina Pats in 2011

He played junior hockey for the Regina Pats of the WHL, serving as team captain his final year (2010–2011).

He was selected by Washington Capitals in the sixth round (175th overall) of the 2009 NHL entry draft. He signed his three-year entry-level contract with the Capitals on March 19, 2011, just after the Regina Pats concluded their 2010–11 season.

In the 2016–17 season, Mitchell made his NHL debut on April 9, 2017 in the Capitals regular season finale against the Florida Panthers.

As a free agent from the Capitals having spent 6 years within the organization, Mitchell opted to continue his tenure as captain of the Hershey Bears in the AHL, securing a one-year contract on July 10, 2017.

Following his eighth year with the Bears in 2017–18, Mitchell left the club as free agent. Over the summer, Mitchell remained un-signed before opting to continue his career in Europe, agreeing to a one-year deal with Slovak club HKm Zvolen of the Slovak Extraliga on November 25, 2018.

After a lone season abroad in Slovakia, Mitchell returned to North America the following summer, agreeing to a contract with the Reading Royals of the ECHL on September 30, 2019. After putting up 20 points in 32 GP with the Reading Royals in the ECHL, Mitchell was loaned to the Laval Rocket. He made 2 appearances with the Rocket before returning to the Royals.

Following his fourth season with the IceHogs, Mitchell ended his 12 year professional career by announcing his retirement on August 31, 2023. He then joined the team at Fox 43 as a color commentator.

== Career statistics ==
=== Regular season and playoffs ===
| | | | Regular season | | | | | Playoffs |
| Season | Team | League | GP | G | A | Pts | PIM | GP | G | A | Pts | PIM |
|---|---|---|---|---|---|---|---|---|---|---|---|---|
| 2006–07 | Regina Pat Canadians | SMHL | 42 | 14 | 11 | 25 | 140 | — | — | — | — | — |
| 2006–07 | Regina Pats | WHL | 4 | 0 | 1 | 1 | 2 | — | — | — | — | — |
| 2007–08 | Regina Pats | WHL | 62 | 8 | 5 | 13 | 73 | 6 | 1 | 0 | 1 | 6 |
| 2008–09 | Regina Pats | WHL | 71 | 10 | 5 | 15 | 140 | — | — | — | — | — |
| 2009–10 | Regina Pats | WHL | 57 | 15 | 16 | 31 | 110 | — | — | — | — | — |
| 2009–10 | Hershey Bears | AHL | 1 | 0 | 0 | 0 | 0 | — | — | — | — | — |
| 2010–11 | Regina Pats | WHL | 70 | 18 | 34 | 52 | 140 | — | — | — | — | — |
| 2010–11 | Hershey Bears | AHL | 2 | 0 | 0 | 0 | 5 | — | — | — | — | — |
| 2011–12 | South Carolina Stingrays | ECHL | 2 | 0 | 0 | 0 | 7 | — | — | — | — | — |
| 2011–12 | Hershey Bears | AHL | 65 | 6 | 9 | 15 | 85 | 5 | 1 | 0 | 1 | 0 |
| 2012–13 | Hershey Bears | AHL | 75 | 15 | 15 | 30 | 94 | 5 | 1 | 0 | 1 | 4 |
| 2013–14 | Hershey Bears | AHL | 17 | 0 | 2 | 2 | 44 | — | — | — | — | — |
| 2014–15 | Hershey Bears | AHL | 64 | 4 | 4 | 8 | 121 | 10 | 1 | 2 | 3 | 10 |
| 2015–16 | Hershey Bears | AHL | 58 | 11 | 16 | 27 | 90 | 20 | 1 | 4 | 5 | 23 |
| 2016–17 | Hershey Bears | AHL | 71 | 10 | 10 | 20 | 121 | 12 | 0 | 0 | 0 | 6 |
| 2016–17 | Washington Capitals | NHL | 1 | 0 | 0 | 0 | 0 | — | — | — | — | — |
| 2017–18 | Hershey Bears | AHL | 47 | 7 | 1 | 8 | 70 | — | — | — | — | — |
| 2018–19 | HKm Zvolen | Slovak | 28 | 4 | 6 | 10 | 70 | 11 | 7 | 2 | 9 | 18 |
| 2019–20 | Reading Royals | ECHL | 40 | 10 | 19 | 29 | 106 | — | — | — | — | — |
| 2019–20 | Laval Rocket | AHL | 2 | 0 | 0 | 0 | 0 | — | — | — | — | — |
| 2019–20 | Rockford IceHogs | AHL | 15 | 4 | 2 | 6 | 9 | — | — | — | — | — |
| 2020–21 | Rockford IceHogs | AHL | 29 | 3 | 2 | 5 | 44 | — | — | — | — | — |
| 2021–22 | Rockford IceHogs | AHL | 67 | 6 | 9 | 15 | 91 | 5 | 0 | 0 | 0 | 4 |
| 2022–23 | Rockford IceHogs | AHL | 24 | 0 | 0 | 0 | 46 | — | — | — | — | — |
| NHL totals | | | 1 | 0 | 0 | 0 | 0 | — | — | — | — | — |

=== International ===
| Year | Team | Event | Result | GP | G | A | Pts | PIM |
|---|---|---|---|---|---|---|---|---|
| 2008 | Canada Western | U17 | 3rd place, bronze medalist(s) | 6 | 4 | 2 | 6 | 20 |
| 2009 | Canada | U18 | 4th | 6 | 0 | 1 | 1 | 6 |
| Junior totals | | | | 12 | 4 | 3 | 7 | 26 |
