= Kevin Lynch (ice hockey) =

American ice hockey player

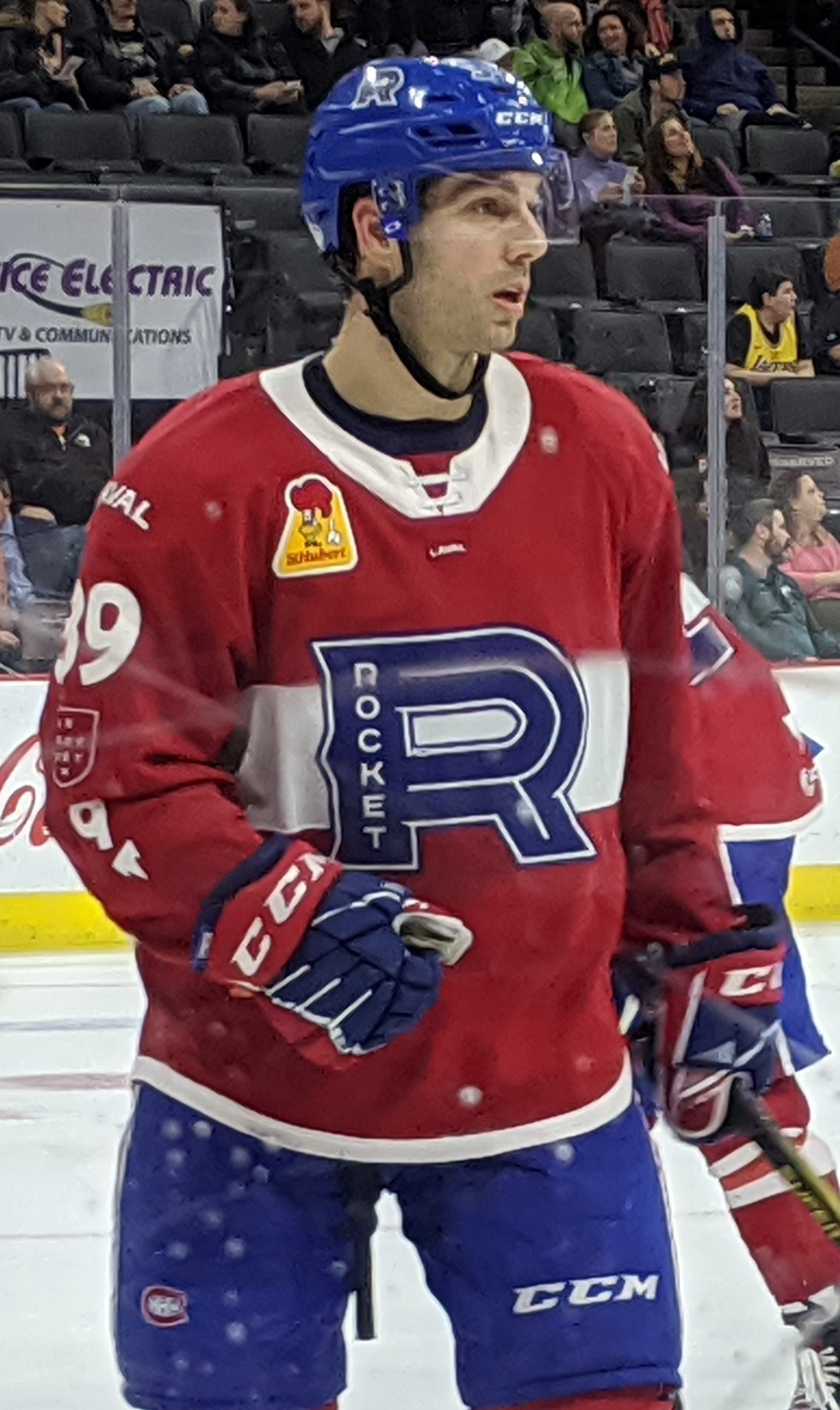
- Lynch with the Laval Rocket in 2020
- Born: April 23, 1991 (age 35) Grosse Pointe, Michigan, U.S.
- Height: 6 ft 1 in (185 cm)
- Weight: 210 lb (95 kg; 15 st 0 lb)
- Position: Center
- Shoots: Right
- ECHL team Former teams: Indy Fuel; Syracuse Crunch; Manitoba Moose; Laval Rocket
- NHL draft: 56th overall, 2009; Columbus Blue Jackets
- Playing career: 2013–present

Kevin Lynch (born April 23, 1991) is an American professional ice hockey player for the Indy Fuel in the ECHL. Lynch was selected by the Columbus Blue Jackets in the 2nd round (56th overall) of the 2009 NHL entry draft.

== Playing career ==
Lynch attended the University of Michigan where he played four seasons (2009 – 2013) of NCAA hockey with the Michigan Wolverines. He was a member of the 2008–09 CCHA champion Wolverines.

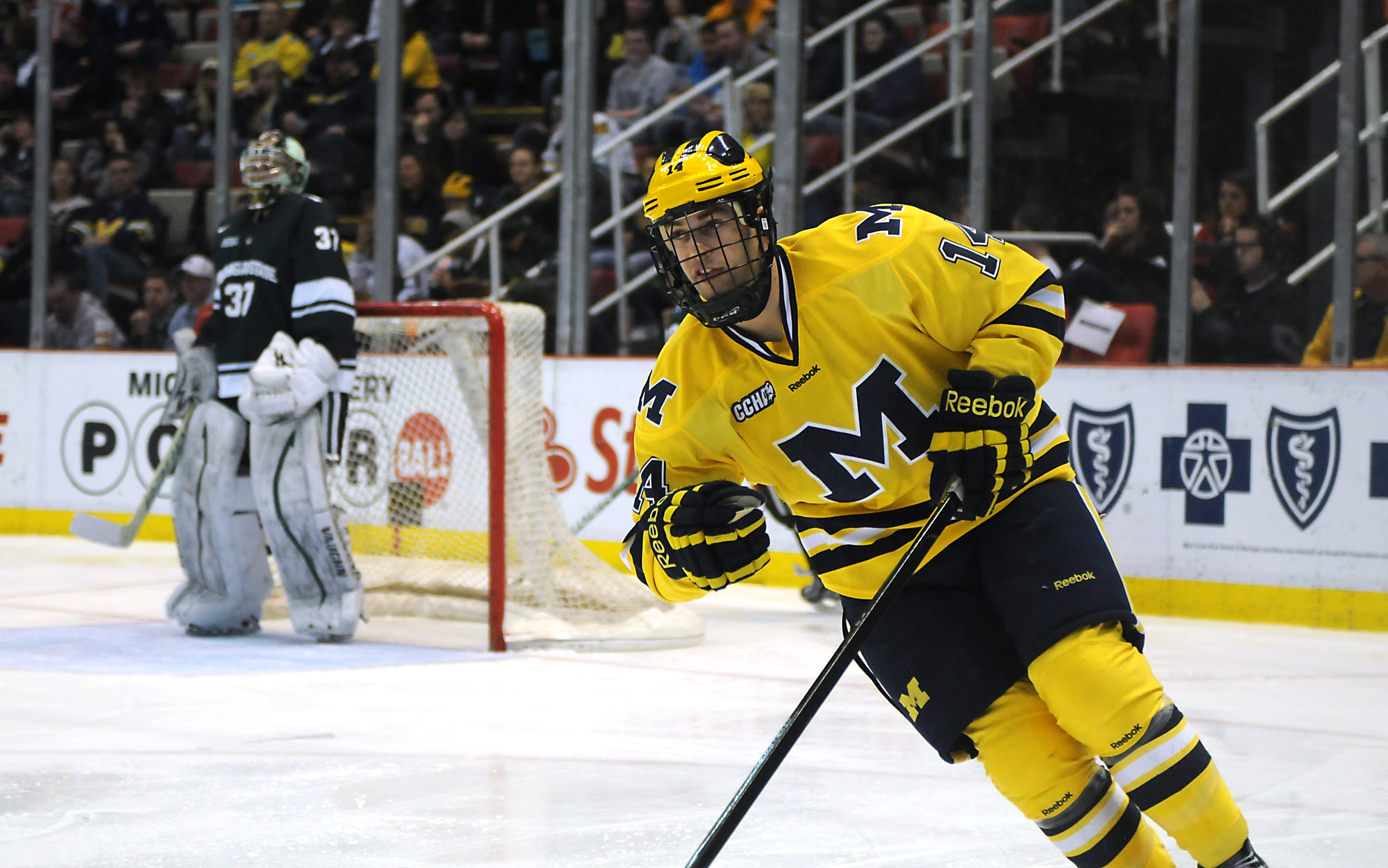
Kevin Lynch with the Michigan Wolverines at Joe Louis Arena on January 11, 2012.

On September 10, 2013, the Grand Rapids Griffins of the American Hockey League signed Lynch to a one-year contract. After attending the Griffins training camp, he was reassigned to ECHL affiliate, the Toledo Walleye to begin the 2013-14 season. Lynch spent the duration of the season in the ECHL, and after 53 games with the Walleye was reassigned to the Evansville IceMen.

On September 11, 2014, Lynch decided to continue in the ECHL, signing a one-year deal with the Florida Everblades. On December 15, 2014, Lynch was signed to an AHL contract for the remainder of the season with the Everblades affiliate, the Syracuse Crunch.

On July 7, 2016, Lynch's rights were traded by the Everblades to the Indy Fuel. He then agreed to a one-year deal with the Fuel.

On January 21, 2017, the Crunch signed Lynch to a PTO. He spent the remainder of the season with the Crunch and the entirety of their Calder Cup playoff run to the finals. Following the finish of the season, the Crunch signed Lynch to a one-year AHL contract for the 2017–18 season.

Following the season, Lynch was signed to a one-year, two-way contract by NHL affiliate, the Tampa Bay Lightning. He missed the entirety of the 2018–19 season due to many injuries sustained throughout the season and three surgeries. He had suffered a concussion and leg injury in preseason action with the Lightning, a groin injury in October 2018, and they were all followed by three surgeries dealing with his injuries.

Lynch earned an offer to 2019 Lightning Training camp despite being a pending free agent. He was later released without a contract and signed to a one-year AHL contract with the Laval Rocket on October 1, 2019. He would spend the 2019–20 season with Laval before being released after appearing in 7 regular season games to start the 2020–21 season.

As a free agent into the off-season, Lynch continued his professional career in agreeing to a one-year AHL contract with the Grand Rapids Griffins on August 9, 2021.

== International play ==
As a junior, Lynch played the USA Hockey National Team Development Program from 2007 – 2009. He won a gold medal with Team USA at the 2009 IIHF World U18 Championships, and was recognized for his outstanding performance during the tournament when he was named a Top 3 Player for his team.

== Career statistics ==
=== Regular season and playoffs ===
			Regular season					Playoffs
Season	Team	League	GP	G	A	Pts	PIM	GP	G	A	Pts	PIM
2007–08	U.S. National Development Team	NAHL	43	11	4	15	24	3	2	0	2	0
2008–09	U.S. National Development Team	NAHL	16	8	7	15	14	—	—	—	—	—
2009–10	University of Michigan	CCHA	45	6	10	16	44	—	—	—	—	—
2010–11	University of Michigan	CCHA	44	11	5	16	36	—	—	—	—	—
2011–12	University of Michigan	CCHA	39	8	5	13	30	—	—	—	—	—
2012–13	University of Michigan	CCHA	40	10	17	27	46	—	—	—	—	—
2013–14	Toledo Walleye	ECHL	53	10	18	28	10	—	—	—	—	—
2013–14	Evansville IceMen	ECHL	14	3	4	7	6	—	—	—	—	—
2014–15	Florida Everblades	ECHL	11	2	5	7	12	—	—	—	—	—
2014–15	Syracuse Crunch	AHL	53	3	1	4	20	1	0	0	0	0
2015–16	Florida Everblades	ECHL	62	22	36	58	32	6	2	2	4	6
2015–16	Manitoba Moose	AHL	5	0	0	0	2	—	—	—	—	—
2015–16	Syracuse Crunch	AHL	2	0	0	0	0	—	—	—	—	—
2016–17	Indy Fuel	ECHL	35	11	13	24	37	—	—	—	—	—
2016–17	Syracuse Crunch	AHL	37	5	2	7	18	19	3	2	5	10
2017–18	Syracuse Crunch	AHL	57	14	12	26	48	7	2	3	5	8
2019–20	Laval Rocket	AHL	54	7	14	21	36	—	—	—	—	—
2020–21	Laval Rocket	AHL	7	1	1	2	0	—	—	—	—	—
AHL totals			215	30	30	60	124	27	5	5	10	18

=== International ===
Year	Team	Event	Result	GP	G	A	Pts	PIM
2008	United States	U17	2nd place, silver medalist(s)	6	3	1	4	6
2009	United States	U18	1st place, gold medalist(s)	7	5	5	10	6
Junior totals				13	8	6	14	12

== Awards and honors ==
Award	Year
International
IIHF World U18 Championship Gold Medal with Team USA	2009
2009 IIHF World U18 Championships Top 3 Player on Team	2009
