= Tom Kühnhackl =

German ice hockey player (born 1992)

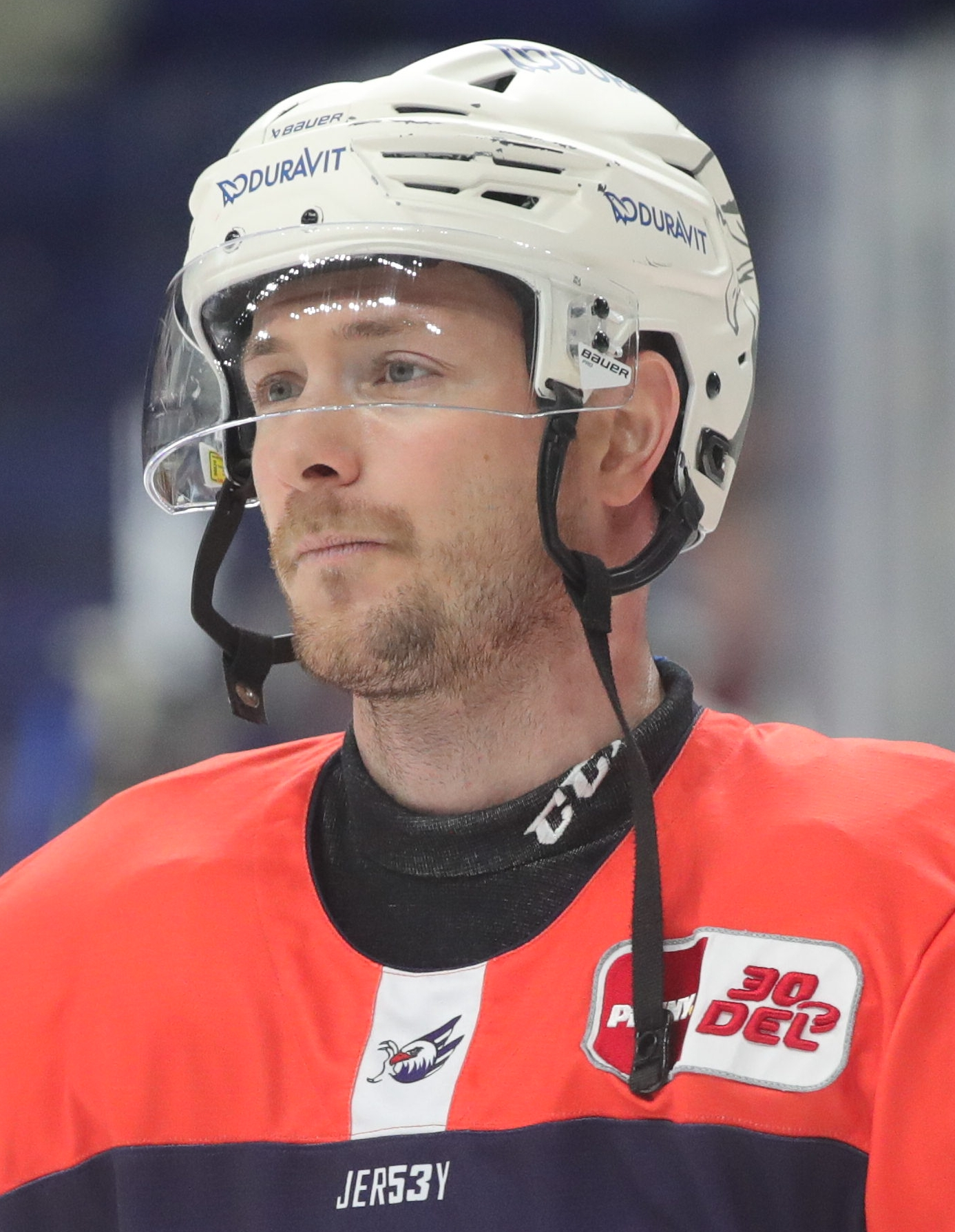
- Kühnhackl with the Adler Mannheim in 2023
- Born: 21 January 1992 (age 34) Landshut, Germany
- Height: 6 ft 2 in (188 cm)
- Weight: 196 lb (89 kg; 14 st 0 lb)
- Position: Forward
- Shoots: Left
- DEL team Former teams: Adler Mannheim; Augsburger Panther; Pittsburgh Penguins; New York Islanders; Skellefteå AIK
- National team: Germany
- NHL draft: 110th overall, 2010; Pittsburgh Penguins
- Playing career: 2009–present

Tom Kühnhackl (born 21 January 1992) is a German professional ice hockey player with Adler Mannheim of the Deutsche Eishockey Liga (DEL). He previously played in the National Hockey League (NHL) with the Pittsburgh Penguins and New York Islanders.

He was a top-ranked prospect for the 2010 NHL entry draft, ranked eighth among European skaters by the NHL Central Scouting Bureau, and was selected 110th overall by the Pittsburgh Penguins. Kühnhackl was selected 24th overall by the Windsor Spitfires in the 2009 CHL Import Draft and moved to North America for the 2010–11 season. After several seasons with the Penguins' minor league affiliates, Kühnhackl made his NHL debut with the team in 2016.

== Playing career ==
Kühnhackl played youth ice hockey for the Landshut Cannibals program for three seasons beginning in 2007 alongside Tobias Rieder. He made his professional debut during the 2008–09 season, playing 42 games with Landshut's professional team in the 2nd Bundesliga, the second-highest level in Germany. He debuted in the Deutsche Eishockey Liga (DEL) during the 2009–10 season, playing four games with the Augsburger Panther.

Kühnhackl was selected 24th overall in the 2009 Canadian Hockey League Import Draft by the Windsor Spitfires of the Ontario Hockey League (OHL). He intended to join the team for the 2009–10 season, but a series of injuries kept him in Germany. In May 2010, he signed a contract with the Spitfires to join the team for the 2010–11 season.

Ranked as the eighth-best European skater of the 2010 draft class by the NHL Central Scouting Bureau, Kühnhackl was selected 110th overall by the Pittsburgh Penguins in the 2010 NHL entry draft. Kühnhackl was happy to be drafted by Pittsburgh, as he listed the Penguins as his favourite team.

On 22 March 2011, he signed a three-year, entry-level contract with the Penguins worth $1.83 million.

Kühnhackl finished the 2010–11 season with 39 goals and 29 assists for 68 points in 63 games with Windsor. He played four games with the Spitfires to start the 2011–12 season, recording one goal and three assists before he was traded, along with Windsor's second-round choice in the 2013 CHL Import Draft, on 2 November 2011, to the Niagara IceDogs in exchange for Phillip Di Giuseppe, Jaroslav Pavelka, Niagara's second-round picks in 2012, 2014 and 2015 and Niagara's first-round pick in 2013.

On 4 November 2011, Kühnhackl delivered an elbow to the head of Kitchener Rangers defenceman Ryan Murphy and was assessed a five-minute major for charging and game misconduct. In a website video, the OHL noted that Kühnhackl made contact with the opponent's head and hit a vulnerable, unsuspecting player. The OHL also considered the speed and distance travelled when making its decision and noted that Murphy was injured on the play. On 8 November, OHL president David Branch announced that Kühnhackl would be suspended for 20 games due to the hit.

Kühnhackl made his professional debut in the 2012–13 season with the Pittsburgh Penguins' American Hockey League (AHL) affiliate, the Wilkes-Barre/Scranton Penguins, but was sidelined by injury after only 11 games. On 2 December 2012, Kühnhackl dislocated his shoulder, requiring season-ending surgery.

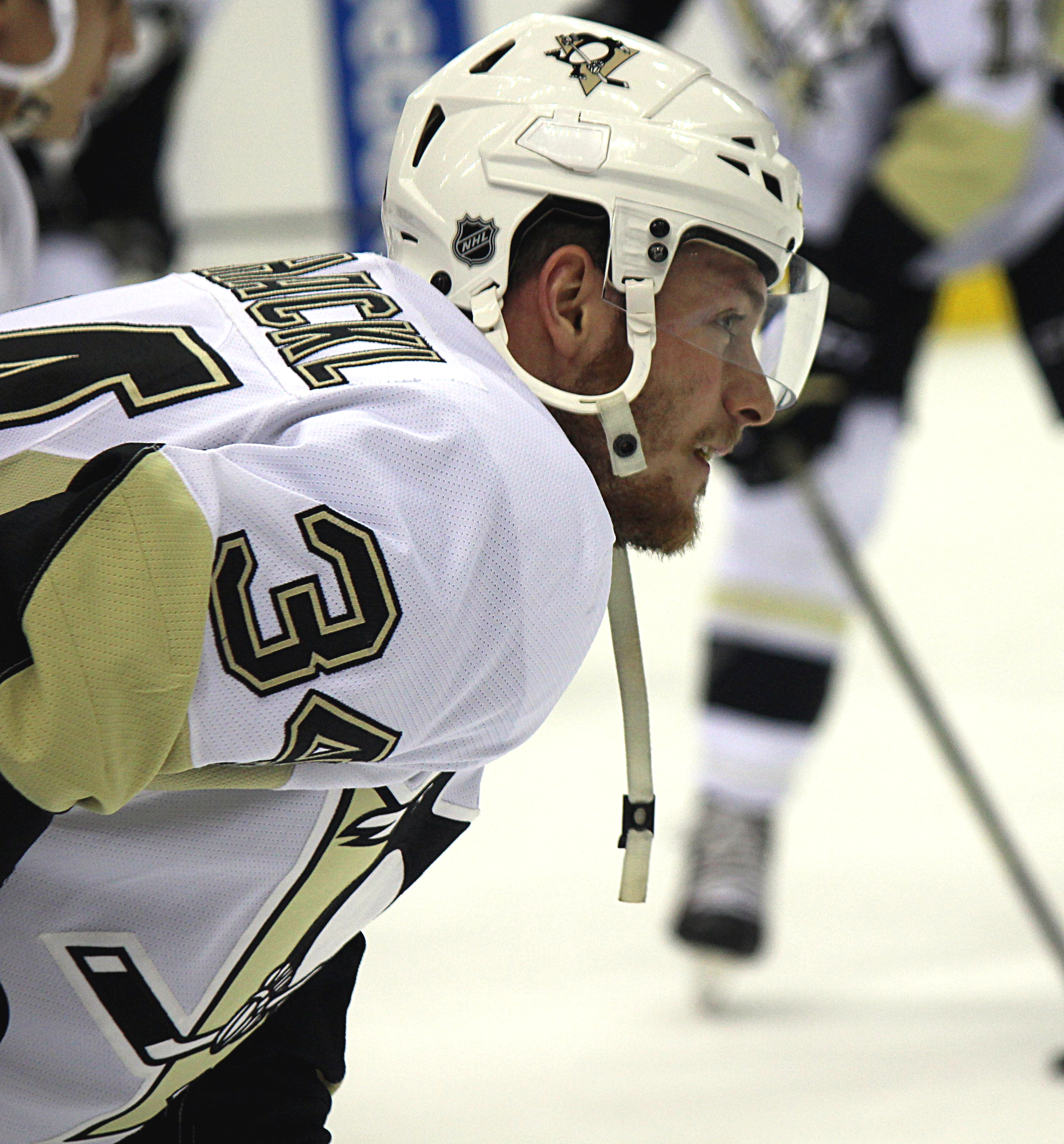
Kühnhackl played 42 games in his first season with the Pittsburgh Penguins.

On 20 February 2016, Kühnhackl scored his first NHL goal, a shorthanded breakaway goal during a game against the Tampa Bay Lightning. On 14 March, after recording six points in his first 28 games, including a two-assist game against the New York Rangers the day before, Kühnhackl signed a two-year contract extension with Pittsburgh, along with fellow breakout players Scott Wilson and Bryan Rust.

Kühnhackl had an impressive run with the Penguins in the 2016 Stanley Cup playoffs, defeating the New York Rangers, Washington Capitals, Tampa Bay Lightning and San Jose Sharks to clinch the Stanley Cup. He became the third German-born NHL player (after Uwe Krupp and Dennis Seidenberg) to win the Cup. In 2017, after the Penguins repeated as Stanley Cup champions, Kühnhackl became the first German-born NHL player to win the Stanley Cup twice with the same team.

After the conclusion of the 2017–18 season, his sixth season within the Penguins' organization, Kühnhackl was unable to agree to terms on a new contract as a restricted free agent. On 25 June 2018, he was not tendered a qualifying offer and was released to explore the free agent market. On 2 July, as a free agent, he signed a one-year contract with the New York Islanders.

On 22 January 2021, Kühnhackl joined the training camp of the Bridgeport Sound Tigers, and was then signed to a one-year contract.

Following his 11th season in North America, Kühnhackl returned to Europe as a free agent, agreeing to a two-year contract with Skellefteå AIK of the Swedish Hockey League (SHL)on 12 August 2021.

At the conclusion of his two-year tenure with Skellefteå AIK, Kühnhackl returned to his native Germany, agreeing to a three-year contract with Adler Mannheim of the DEL on 2 May 2023.

== International play ==
Kühnhackl has represented Germany internationally, playing in the World U-17 Hockey Challenge (2008, 2009), the World U18 Championships (2009, 2010), and the World Junior Championships (2011).

He first played for the German senior team in an exhibition game against France on 27 August 2016. A couple of days later, he scored the game-winning goal in the last game of the qualification tournament for the 2018 Winter Olympics against host Latvia, which gave Germany a place in the Olympics.

== Personal life ==
Kühnhackl was born and raised in Landshut, and first began to play ice hockey at age two. His father, Erich, played in the top German leagues from 1968 until 1989 and appeared in five Winter Olympics for West Germany. He was named Germany's ice hockey player of the 20th century in 2000. Kühnhackl has been a lifelong fan of the Pittsburgh Penguins, the team that drafted him. He got his start in ice hockey at age five, following in his family's footsteps as his brother, sister and father all played the sport in Germany.

Kühnhackl is a supporter of FC Bayern Munich.

== Career statistics ==
=== Regular season and playoffs ===
| | | | Regular season | | | | | Playoffs |
| Season | Team | League | GP | G | A | Pts | PIM | GP | G | A | Pts | PIM |
|---|---|---|---|---|---|---|---|---|---|---|---|---|
| 2007–08 | Landshut Cannibals | DNL | 30 | 21 | 21 | 42 | 97 | 3 | 1 | 1 | 2 | 2 |
| 2008–09 | Landshut Cannibals | DNL | 6 | 4 | 3 | 7 | 31 | 7 | 5 | 5 | 10 | 27 |
| 2008–09 | Landshut Cannibals | 2.GBun | 42 | 11 | 10 | 21 | 34 | 6 | 1 | 0 | 1 | 6 |
| 2009–10 | Landshut Cannibals | 2.GBun | 38 | 12 | 9 | 21 | 38 | 6 | 0 | 0 | 0 | 2 |
| 2009–10 | Augsburger Panther | DEL | 4 | 0 | 0 | 0 | 0 | — | — | — | — | — |
| 2010–11 | Windsor Spitfires | OHL | 63 | 39 | 29 | 68 | 47 | 18 | 11 | 12 | 23 | 10 |
| 2011–12 | Windsor Spitfires | OHL | 4 | 1 | 3 | 4 | 6 | — | — | — | — | — |
| 2011–12 | Niagara IceDogs | OHL | 30 | 7 | 18 | 25 | 29 | 20 | 6 | 5 | 11 | 14 |
| 2012–13 | Wilkes–Barre/Scranton Penguins | AHL | 11 | 2 | 2 | 4 | 6 | — | — | — | — | — |
| 2012–13 | Wheeling Nailers | ECHL | 2 | 1 | 0 | 1 | 2 | — | — | — | — | — |
| 2013–14 | Wilkes–Barre/Scranton Penguins | AHL | 48 | 8 | 2 | 10 | 22 | 2 | 0 | 0 | 0 | 2 |
| 2013–14 | Wheeling Nailers | ECHL | 16 | 7 | 7 | 14 | 12 | 10 | 6 | 0 | 6 | 6 |
| 2014–15 | Wilkes–Barre/Scranton Penguins | AHL | 72 | 12 | 18 | 30 | 19 | 8 | 0 | 2 | 2 | 0 |
| 2015–16 | Wilkes–Barre/Scranton Penguins | AHL | 23 | 7 | 8 | 15 | 18 | — | — | — | — | — |
| 2015–16 | Pittsburgh Penguins | NHL | 42 | 5 | 10 | 15 | 24 | 24 | 2 | 3 | 5 | 0 |
| 2016–17 | Pittsburgh Penguins | NHL | 57 | 4 | 12 | 16 | 18 | 11 | 1 | 1 | 2 | 4 |
| 2017–18 | Pittsburgh Penguins | NHL | 69 | 2 | 6 | 8 | 6 | 12 | 0 | 0 | 0 | 4 |
| 2018–19 | New York Islanders | NHL | 36 | 4 | 5 | 9 | 10 | 8 | 0 | 3 | 3 | 2 |
| 2018–19 | Bridgeport Sound Tigers | AHL | 1 | 2 | 1 | 3 | 0 | — | — | — | — | — |
| 2019–20 | New York Islanders | NHL | 28 | 3 | 3 | 6 | 2 | 3 | 0 | 1 | 1 | 0 |
| 2019–20 | Bridgeport Sound Tigers | AHL | 4 | 0 | 2 | 2 | 2 | — | — | — | — | — |
| 2020–21 | Bridgeport Sound Tigers | AHL | 22 | 4 | 9 | 13 | 8 | — | — | — | — | — |
| 2021–22 | Skellefteå AIK | SHL | 46 | 3 | 10 | 13 | 6 | 6 | 0 | 1 | 1 | 2 |
| 2022–23 | Skellefteå AIK | SHL | 32 | 10 | 8 | 18 | 14 | 17 | 2 | 3 | 5 | 0 |
| 2023–24 | Adler Mannheim | DEL | 45 | 8 | 13 | 21 | 8 | 7 | 1 | 4 | 5 | 6 |
| 2024–25 | Adler Mannheim | DEL | 43 | 10 | 10 | 20 | 18 | 10 | 2 | 0 | 2 | 2 |
| NHL totals | | | 232 | 18 | 36 | 54 | 60 | 58 | 3 | 8 | 11 | 10 |

=== International ===
| Year | Team | Event | Result | GP | G | A | Pts | PIM |
|---|---|---|---|---|---|---|---|---|
| 2008 | Germany | U17 | 9th | 5 | 4 | 1 | 5 | 2 |
| 2009 | Germany | U17 | 6th | 5 | 4 | 3 | 7 | 2 |
| 2009 | Germany | WJC18 | 10th | 6 | 1 | 1 | 2 | 4 |
| 2010 | Germany | WJC18 D1 | 1st | 5 | 4 | 2 | 6 | 2 |
| 2011 | Germany | WJC | 10th | 6 | 1 | 0 | 1 | 16 |
| 2016 | Germany | OGQ | Q | 3 | 2 | 1 | 3 | 0 |
| 2021 | Germany | WC | 4th | 10 | 3 | 2 | 5 | 2 |
| 2022 | Germany | OG | 10th | 4 | 1 | 0 | 1 | 2 |
| Junior totals | | | | 27 | 14 | 7 | 21 | 26 |
| Senior totals | | | | 17 | 6 | 3 | 9 | 4 |

== Awards and honours ==
| Awards | Year | Ref |
NHL
| Stanley Cup champion | 2016, 2017 | |
