= Drew Shore =

American ice hockey player (born 1991)

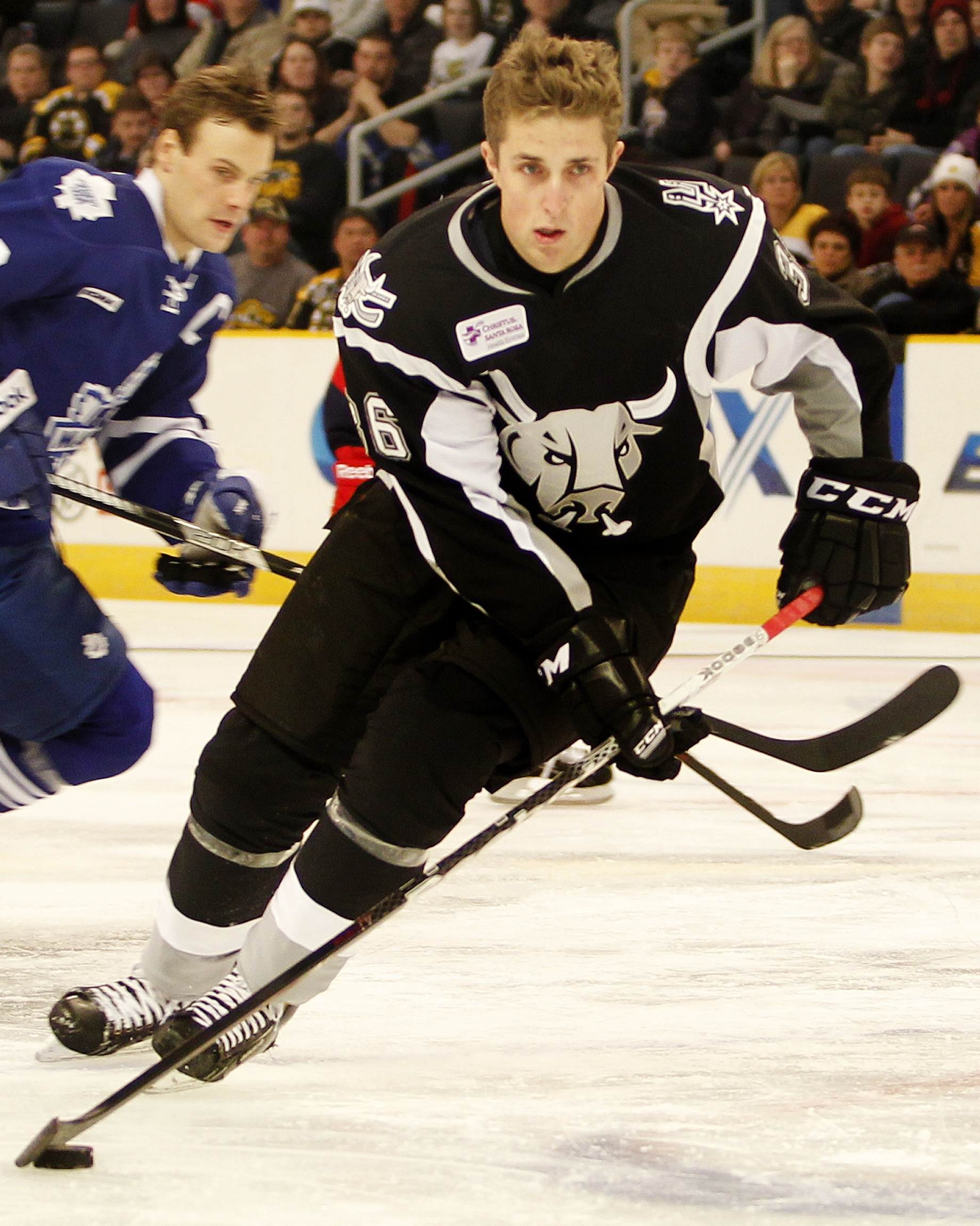
- Shore with the San Antonio Rampage in 2013
- Born: January 29, 1991 (age 35) Denver, Colorado, U.S.
- Height: 6 ft 3 in (191 cm)
- Weight: 205 lb (93 kg; 14 st 9 lb)
- Position: Center
- Shot: Right
- Played for: Florida Panthers; Calgary Flames; EHC Kloten; Vancouver Canucks; ZSC Lions; Kunlun Red Star; Dinamo Minsk; Torpedo Nizhny Novgorod; HK Dukla Trenčín; Carolina Hurricanes
- National team: United States
- NHL draft: 44th overall, 2009; Florida Panthers
- Playing career: 2012–2021

Drew Shore (born January 29, 1991) is an American former professional ice hockey center who played in the National Hockey League (NHL). He was a second round selection, 44th overall, of the Florida Panthers at the 2009 NHL entry draft and played parts of two seasons with Florida prior to being traded to Calgary. Internationally, Shore has represented the United States at both the junior and senior levels; He was a member of the American entry at the 2014 IIHF World Championship.

== Playing career ==
=== Junior and college ===
As a youth, Shore played in the 2003 Quebec International Pee-Wee Hockey Tournament with the Colorado Avalanche minor ice hockey team from Littleton, Colorado.

After playing the 2006–07 season with Detroit Honeybaked of the Midwest Elite Hockey League, Shore had several options for junior hockey. The Chilliwack Bruins of the Western Hockey League selected him with their second round pick in that league's Bantam Draft, however Shore opted to remain in the United States and joined the USA Hockey National Team Development Program (USNTDP) in 2007. As a member of the USNTDP Under-17 team, Shore played 54 games in 2007–08, scored 13 goals and added 25 assists. He made his first international debut that season as a member of Team USA at the 2008 World U-17 Hockey Challenge. Shore recorded seven points in six games as the Americans won the silver medal.

In a combined 62 games between North American Hockey League (NAHL) play and various exhibitions with the USNTDP Under-18 team in 2008–09, Shore scored 17 goals and led his team with 32 assists. He caught the attention of National Hockey League (NHL) scouts in advance of the 2009 NHL entry draft, and was ranked as high as 11th overall by International Scouting Services and 32nd among North American skaters by the NHL Central Scouting Bureau. The Florida Panthers selected him with their second round pick, 44th overall, however he did not sign with the team immediately as Shore committed to play college hockey for the University of Denver Pioneers.

As a freshman in 2009–10 Shore scored 5 goals and 18 assists for Denver, who won the Western Collegiate Hockey Association (WCHA) regular season title. He then led the Pioneers in scoring with 46 points and was named a WCHA Second Team All-Star in 2009–10. At the 2011 World Junior Hockey Championship, Shore appeared in six games and scored two goals. He was again named a WCHA All-Star in his junior season of 2011–12 after leading his team and finishing fourth overall in National Collegiate Athletic Association (NCAA) Division I scoring with 53 points. Shore opted to forgo his final season of college eligibility and turned professional upon the conclusion of his college season; the Panthers assigned him to their American Hockey League (AHL) affiliate, the San Antonio Rampage. Shore scored his first professional point on March 31, 2012, with an assist against the Rockford IceHogs.

=== Professional ===
Playing his first full professional season in 2012–13, Shore began the season with San Antonio where he scored 30 points in 41 games. He played in the AHL All-Star Game, and was recalled to the Panthers upon the resolution of the 2012–13 NHL lockout in time to make his NHL debut on January 22, 2013, against the Montreal Canadiens. He scored his first NHL goal on February 12, against goaltender Braden Holtby of the Washington Capitals in a 6–5 loss. Shore played 43 games for the Panthers in his rookie season and scored 3 goals along with 10 assists.

Shore split the 2013–14 season between San Antonio and Florida. He scored 32 points in 50 games for the Rampage and had 5 goals and 2 assists for the Panthers in 24 games. The combination of the Panthers' depth at center and Shore being only one game shy of requiring waivers – and the risk of losing him to any other team at no cost – caused the Panthers to start him with San Antonio in 2014–15. Unable to fit him into their NHL lineup, the team finally traded Shore to the Calgary Flames on January 9, 2015, in exchange for Corban Knight. At the time of the deal, Shore was 12th in AHL scoring with 30 points and had been named to play in the All-Star Game. He made his debut with Calgary on January 15 in a 4–1 victory over the Arizona Coyotes.

After parts of two seasons within the Flames organization, Shore left as free agent in the off-season, signing his first European contract in agreeing to a one-year deal with EHC Kloten of the Swiss National League A on August 12, 2016. In the 2016–17 season, on September 26, 2016, the SIHF announced that Shore was suspended for one game and fined CHF 1,230 for a slew-footing on ZSC Lions's Mattias Sjögren. In late December 2016, he played as a loan player for HC Davos in the Spengler Cup and was named to the tournament's all-star team. On March 12, 2017, having led his team with 24 goals and 48 points in 50 games and with Kloten avoiding the playout final despite 3 games remaining in the playout round, Shore was granted a release from his contract to join the Vancouver Canucks of the National Hockey League (NHL) for the remainder of the season. Shore immediately was drawn into the lineup and played out the season in registering 2 assists in 14 games.

Unable to continue his production from Switzerland with the Canucks, as an impending free agent, Shore opted to return to the NL, signing a two-year contract with the ZSC Lions on May 29, 2017.

In the second year of his contract with ZSC in 2018–19, Shore made 16 appearances for 10 points before leaving the club mid-year in favour for the KHL, agreeing to terms for the remainder of the season with Chinese outfit, Kunlun Red Star, on December 27, 2018.

Having played three successive seasons abroad, Shore returned to North America as a free agent to sign a one-year, two-way NHL contract with the Carolina Hurricanes on October 21, 2020. In preparation for the indefinitely delayed North American season, Shore alongside brother Nick, opted to sign a short-term loan contract abroad with Slovak club, HK Dukla Trenčín of the Tipsport Liga on November 19, 2020. In just five games with Dukla, Shore collected 10 points before he returned to North America on December 3, 2020.

At the conclusion of his contract with the Hurricanes, Shore opted to end his nine-year professional career, announcing his retirement on June 15, 2021, to join the Wasserman Hockey Agency.

== Personal life ==
His younger brothers are also hockey players; Nick is a center for EV Zug and Quentin played NCAA college hockey at the University of Denver and was selected by the Los Angeles Kings in the 2013 NHL entry draft. His youngest brother Baker plays for Harvard University.

== Career statistics ==
=== Regular season and playoffs ===
			Regular season					Playoffs
Season	Team	League	GP	G	A	Pts	PIM	GP	G	A	Pts	PIM
2006–07	Honeybaked 16U AAA	T1EHL	31	9	25	34	20	—	—	—	—	—
2007–08	U.S. NTDP U17	USDP	16	4	8	12	6	—	—	—	—	—
2007–08	U.S. NTDP U18	NAHL	35	9	16	25	12	3	0	1	1	0
2008–09	U.S. NTDP U18	USDP	47	10	25	35	30	—	—	—	—	—
2008–09	U.S. NTDP U18	NAHL	15	7	7	14	16	—	—	—	—	—
2009–10	University of Denver	WCHA	41	5	14	19	18	—	—	—	—	—
2010–11	University of Denver	WCHA	40	23	23	46	38	—	—	—	—	—
2011–12	University of Denver	WCHA	42	22	31	53	45	—	—	—	—	—
2011–12	San Antonio Rampage	AHL	8	1	2	3	4	9	2	0	2	2
2012–13	San Antonio Rampage	AHL	41	10	20	30	18	—	—	—	—	—
2012–13	Florida Panthers	NHL	43	3	10	13	14	—	—	—	—	—
2013–14	Florida Panthers	NHL	24	5	2	7	8	—	—	—	—	—
2013–14	San Antonio Rampage	AHL	50	6	26	32	25	—	—	—	—	—
2014–15	San Antonio Rampage	AHL	35	9	21	30	16	—	—	—	—	—
2014–15	Adirondack Flames	AHL	12	3	4	7	8	—	—	—	—	—
2014–15	Calgary Flames	NHL	11	1	2	3	0	1	0	0	0	2
2015–16	Stockton Heat	AHL	59	10	28	38	22	—	—	—	—	—
2015–16	Calgary Flames	NHL	2	0	1	1	2	—	—	—	—	—
2016–17	EHC Kloten	NLA	50	24	24	48	28	—	—	—	—	—
2016–17	Vancouver Canucks	NHL	14	0	2	2	4	—	—	—	—	—
2017–18	ZSC Lions	NL	24	1	14	15	14	12	4	4	8	6
2018–19	ZSC Lions	NL	16	4	6	10	18	—	—	—	—	—
2018–19	Kunlun Red Star	KHL	18	6	5	11	8	—	—	—	—	—
2019–20	Dinamo Minsk	KHL	24	3	14	17	8	—	—	—	—	—
2019–20	Torpedo Nizhny Novgorod	KHL	19	1	9	10	6	3	0	0	0	2
2020–21	HK Dukla Trenčín	Slovak	5	3	7	10	4	—	—	—	—	—
2020–21	Chicago Wolves	AHL	7	0	1	1	6	—	—	—	—	—
2020–21	Carolina Hurricanes	NHL	4	0	0	0	2	—	—	—	—	—
NHL totals			98	9	17	26	30	1	0	0	0	2

Medal record

Representing (United States) USA

Ice hockey

World Junior Championships
Bronze medal – third place	2011 Buffalo	

IIHF World U18 Championships
Gold medal – first place	2009 Minnesota	

World U-17 Hockey Challenge
Silver medal – second place	2008 Canada	

=== International ===
Year	Team	Event	Result	GP	G	A	Pts	PIM
2008	United States	U17	2nd place, silver medalist(s)	6	3	4	7	4
2009	United States	U18	1st place, gold medalist(s)	7	2	7	9	6
2011	United States	WJC	3rd place, bronze medalist(s)	7	4	3	7	0
2014	United States	WC	6th	8	1	1	2	2
Junior totals				20	9	14	23	10
Senior totals				8	1	1	2	2

== Awards and honors ==
Award	Year
College
WCHA All-Academic Team	2011, 2012
WCHA Second Team	2011, 2012
