= Andrew Agozzino =

Canadian ice hockey player (born 1991)

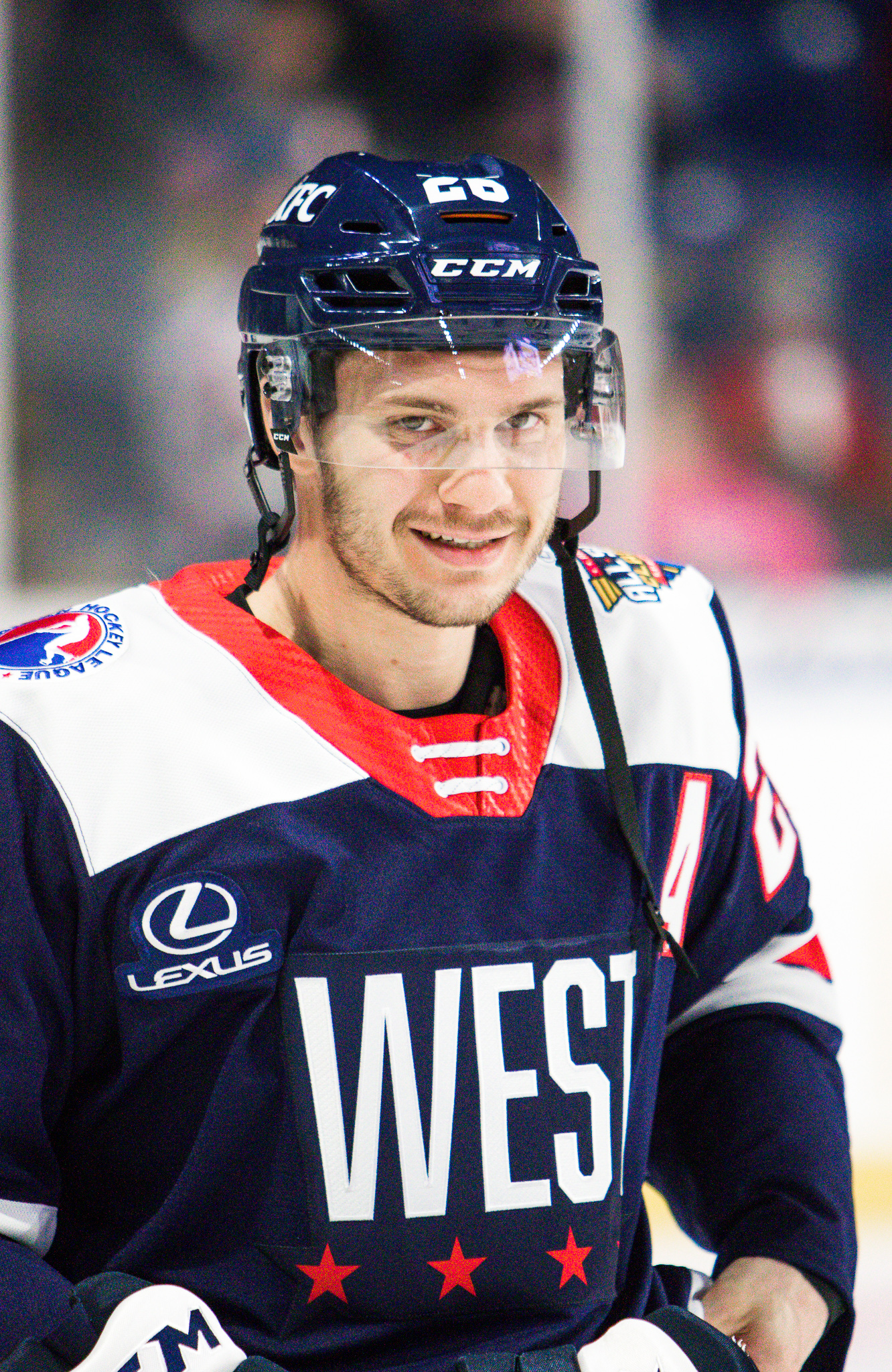
- Agozzino at the 2019 AHL All-Star Game
- Born: January 3, 1991 (age 35) Kleinburg, Ontario, Canada
- Height: 5 ft 10 in (178 cm)
- Weight: 187 lb (85 kg; 13 st 5 lb)
- Position: Left wing
- Shot: Left
- Played for: Colorado Avalanche; Pittsburgh Penguins; Anaheim Ducks; Ottawa Senators; San Jose Sharks; Utah Mammoth
- NHL draft: Undrafted
- Playing career: 2010–2026

Andrew Agozzino (born January 3, 1991) is a Canadian former professional ice hockey left wing who played parts of eight seasons in the National Hockey League (NHL) for the Colorado Avalanche, Pittsburgh Penguins, Anaheim Ducks, Ottawa Senators, San Jose Sharks and Utah Mammoth. An undrafted player, Agozzino played junior hockey with the Niagara IceDogs of the Ontario Hockey League, before later signing with the Avalanche as a free agent.

== Playing career ==
=== Junior ===
Agozzino first played major junior hockey with the Niagara IceDogs of the Ontario Hockey League (OHL). He was originally selected as the Mississauga IceDogs first round draft pick, chosen 15th overall in the 2007 OHL Priority Draft before the team promptly relocated to Niagara. Agozzino scored 12 goals in 50 games during his rookie campaign in 2007–08 and as an Ontario native, he was selected to the Canada Ontario team for the 2008 World U-17 Hockey Challenge scoring five goals in six games to help capture the gold medal. In his sophomore season, Agozzino showed glimpses of leadership and improved to finish second on the IceDogs with 27 goals in the 2008–09 season. With two consecutive seasons of showing offensive potential, Agozzino was invited to the St. Louis Blues 2009 orientation camp.

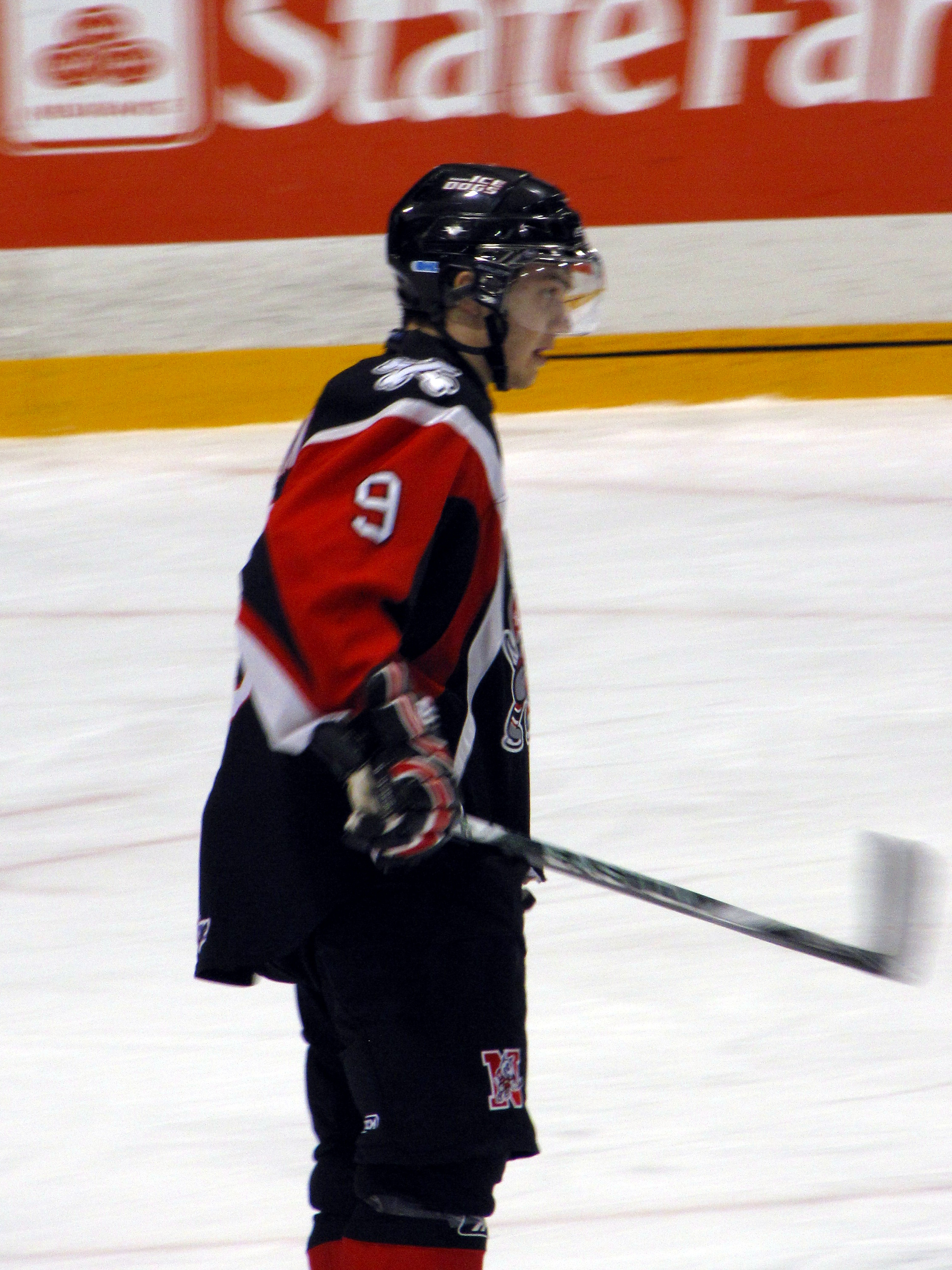
Agozzino with Niagara IceDogs in 2009

After the departure of former captain Alex Pietrangelo, Agozzino was named as the IceDogs new captain midway through the 2009–10 season. Agozzino led the IceDogs by example, scoring a team high 37 goals and 66 points. As the IceDogs representative to the 2010 OHL All-Star Classic, he was named as the Eastern Conference player of the game after scoring an All-Star record four goals. Undrafted in the NHL, due to his diminutive stature, Agozzino was signed upon the completion of the IceDogs season to an amateur try-out contract with the Peoria Rivermen of the American Hockey League (AHL), an affiliate of the Blues. He made his professional debut on April 9, 2010, against the Manitoba Moose and skated in the Rivermen's two final regular season games.

He returned to Niagara in the 2010–11 season, to again lead the team with 43 goals in 68 games. Without a professional contract on offer, Agozzino returned for his overage and final year with the IceDogs in 2011–12. For a third consecutive season, he led the team with 40 goals and produced a career high 48 assists and 88 points, to finish fifth in the OHL scoring race. After guiding the IceDogs to finish as finalists for the J. Ross Robertson Cup, Agozzino was selected as the recipient of the Leo Lalonde Memorial Trophy as the league top overage player and the Mickey Renaud Captain's Trophy as the league's best captain. He completed his junior career with the IceDogs with the franchise records in goals (159), assists (147), points (306) and games (316).

=== Professional ===
In his first full professional season in 2012–13, Agozzino was signed to a one-year AHL contract with the Lake Erie Monsters. In his Monsters debut on opening night, Agozzino scored his first professional goal and game-winner in a 2–1 victory over the Oklahoma City Barons on October 12, 2012. After initially claiming a role on the checking lines, he quickly and unexpectedly established himself amongst the Monsters scoring forwards to begin the season. At the midpoint of the season, and amongst the Monsters leaders in scoring, he was selected alongside fellow Monsters rookie Michael Sgarbossa to participate in the AHL All-Star Game. He subsequently became the first Monsters player in franchise history to then be voted as a starter to the victorious Western Conference All-Star lineup. On March 22, 2013, Agozzino's smooth transition to the professional ranks was completed when he was signed to a two-year entry-level contract with the Colorado Avalanche, the NHL parent club of the Monsters. With Lake Erie out of the playoffs, he finished the regular season as one of only two skaters to have played in every game for the Monsters, whilst leading the team with 32 assists and 52 points.

In the 2014–15 season, with the Avalanche suffering a rash of injuries, Agozzino received his first NHL recall on November 21, 2014. He made his NHL debut with the Avalanche, registering an assist, in a 4–3 victory over the Carolina Hurricanes on November 22, 2014. Following the 2014–15 season, Agozzino became a restricted free agent under the NHL Collective Bargaining Agreement. The Avalanche made him a qualifying offer to retain his NHL rights and, on July 5, 2015, Agozzino filed for salary arbitration. On July 16, Agozzino settled before arbitration in agreeing to a one-year, two-way contract with the Avalanche.

Having left the Avalanche organization as a free agent, Agozzino agreed to a one-year, two-way contract with the St. Louis Blues on July 1, 2016. After attending the Blues 2016 training camp, Agozzino was assigned to begin the 2016–17 season, in the AHL with their affiliate, the Chicago Wolves. Following his adjustment to a new playing system, Agozzino remained in the AHL for the duration of the season in continuing his career scoring pace with 18 goals and 54 points in 71 games. Despite a solid performance with the Wolves, Agozzino was never recalled by the Blues.

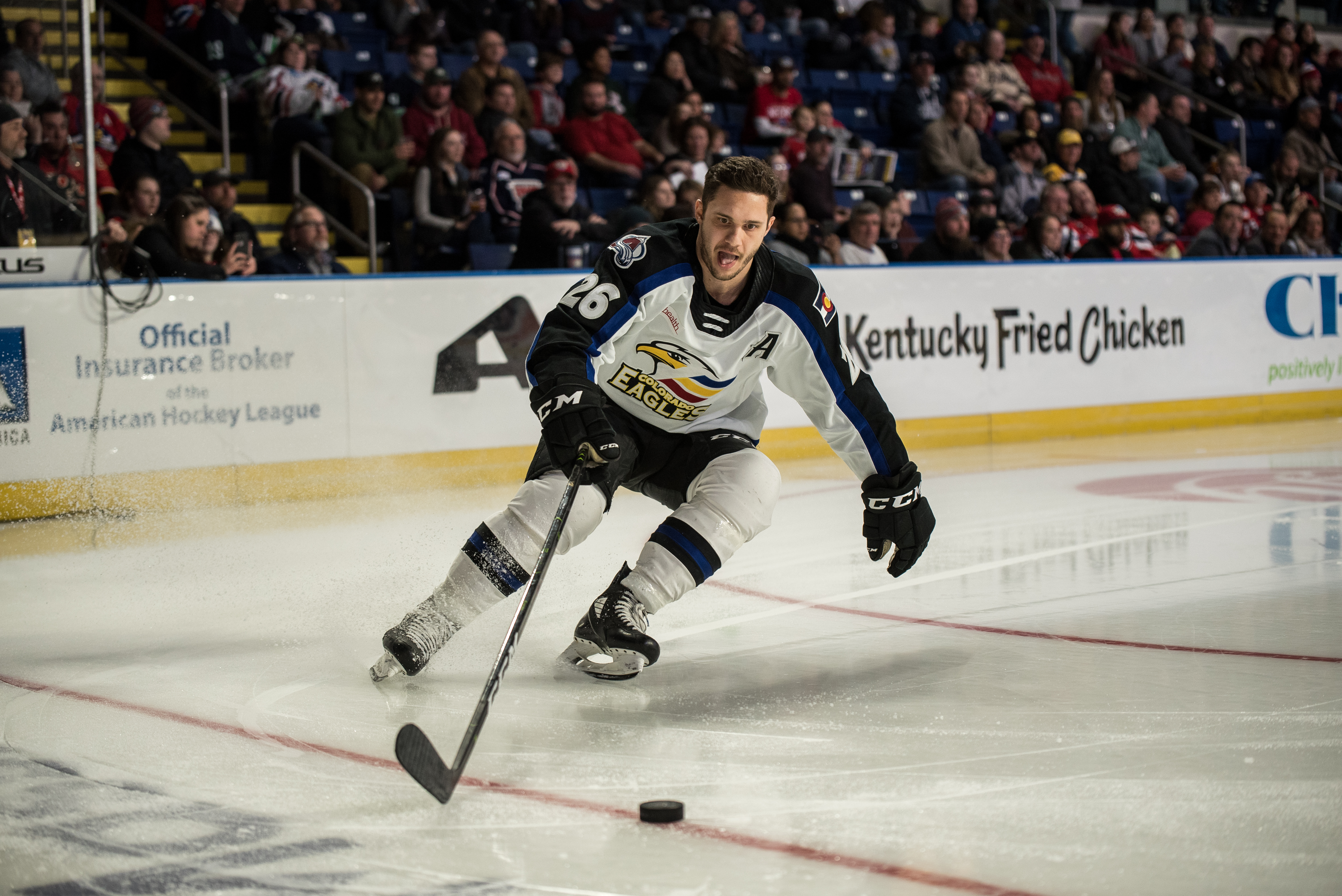
Agozzino representing the Colorado Eagles at the 2019 All-Star Classic.

A year later, after leaving St. Louis as a free agent, Agozzino opted to return to his original club, the Colorado Avalanche, in signing a two-year, two-way contract. He primarily played with the Avalanche's AHL affiliates, the San Antonio Rampage and then the Colorado Eagles. In the 2018–19 season, Agozzino was named an alternate captain of the Eagles. He was also named to the 2019 AHL All-Star game that season. Agozzino scored his first NHL goal in the Avalanche's 3–0 win over the Vegas Golden Knights on February 19, 2019. He got into eleven games with the Avalanche in 2018–19.

As a free agent at the conclusion of his contract with the Avalanche, Agozzino left to sign a two-year, two-way $700,000 contract with the Pittsburgh Penguins on July 1, 2019. He began the 2019–20 season with their AHL affiliate, the Wilkes-Barre/Scranton Penguins but was called up played a single game with the Penguins due to injuries. He played in the 2020 AHL All-Star Game. In a second recall to the NHL, Agozzino made a career best 17 appearances with the Penguins, notching two assists. At the trade deadline, Agozzino was placed on waivers by the Penguins and claimed the following day by the Anaheim Ducks on February 24, 2020. He appeared in three games with Anaheim and 31 games for their AHL affiliate, the San Diego Gulls.

On July 28, 2021, Agozzino was signed as a free agent to a one-year, two-way contract with the Ottawa Senators. He appeared in one game for Ottawa and led their AHL affiliate, the Belleville Senators in goals that season.

In the off-season, having left the Senators as a free agent, Agozzino was signed to a two-year, two-way contract with the San Jose Sharks on July 13, 2022. He was brought to San Jose to be a leader within the locker room with the Sharks AHL affiliate, the San Jose Barracuda. In his first season with the Barracuda, he finished first on the team in points with 61 in 63 games. He was recalled by the Sharks on March 20, 2023, and played in four games, tallying three points.

On June 27, 2023, Agozzino was traded by the Sharks in a return to the Anaheim Ducks organization in exchange for pending free agent Andrej Šustr. Agozzino failed to make the Ducks roster out of training camp and was waived by the team. After going unclaimed, he was assigned to the San Diego Gulls to begin the 2023–24 season.

Agozzino ended his second stint with the Ducks at the conclusion of his contract and was signed to a two-year, two-way contract with the Utah Mammoth (then the Utah Hockey Club) on July 2, 2024. After going unclaimed on waivers, Agozzino was assigned to Utah's AHL affiliate, the Tucson Roadrunners for the 2024–25 season.

At the conclusion of his contract with the Mammoth, Agozzino as a pending free agent opted to sign abroad for the first time in his career, signing a one-year contract with EHC Biel-Bienne of the Swiss National League on June 3, 2026. However, a month and a half later, Agozzino and Biel-Bienne opted to part ways, with Agozzino announcing his retirement from hockey on July 21.

== Career statistics ==
=== Regular season and playoffs ===
			Regular season					Playoffs
Season	Team	League	GP	G	A	Pts	PIM	GP	G	A	Pts	PIM
2007–08	Niagara IceDogs	OHL	50	12	10	22	47	—	—	—	—	—
2008–09	Niagara IceDogs	OHL	67	27	29	56	88	12	6	5	11	24
2009–10	Niagara IceDogs	OHL	66	37	29	66	95	5	3	2	5	15
2009–10	Peoria Rivermen	AHL	2	0	0	0	0	—	—	—	—	—
2010–11	Niagara IceDogs	OHL	68	43	31	74	73	14	6	7	13	19
2011–12	Niagara IceDogs	OHL	67	40	48	88	67	20	11	7	18	16
2012–13	Lake Erie Monsters	AHL	76	20	32	52	73	—	—	—	—	—
2013–14	Lake Erie Monsters	AHL	75	17	32	49	73	—	—	—	—	—
2014–15	Lake Erie Monsters	AHL	74	30	34	64	55	—	—	—	—	—
2014–15	Colorado Avalanche	NHL	1	0	1	1	0	—	—	—	—	—
2015–16	San Antonio Rampage	AHL	41	12	17	29	32	—	—	—	—	—
2015–16	Colorado Avalanche	NHL	9	0	2	2	0	—	—	—	—	—
2016–17	Chicago Wolves	AHL	71	18	36	54	57	10	3	3	6	6
2017–18	San Antonio Rampage	AHL	72	23	21	44	63	—	—	—	—	—
2018–19	Colorado Eagles	AHL	56	26	34	60	67	4	3	0	3	6
2018–19	Colorado Avalanche	NHL	11	1	1	2	0	—	—	—	—	—
2019–20	Wilkes-Barre/Scranton Penguins	AHL	37	14	19	33	28	—	—	—	—	—
2019–20	Pittsburgh Penguins	NHL	17	0	2	2	4	—	—	—	—	—
2019–20	Anaheim Ducks	NHL	5	1	0	1	0	—	—	—	—	—
2020–21	Anaheim Ducks	NHL	3	0	1	1	0	—	—	—	—	—
2020–21	San Diego Gulls	AHL	31	13	14	27	27	3	2	2	4	2
2021–22	Belleville Senators	AHL	66	20	23	43	61	2	1	2	3	0
2021–22	Ottawa Senators	NHL	1	0	0	0	0	—	—	—	—	—
2022–23	San Jose Barracuda	AHL	63	26	35	61	72	—	—	—	—	—
2022–23	San Jose Sharks	NHL	4	1	2	3	0	—	—	—	—	—
2023–24	San Diego Gulls	AHL	72	26	38	64	44	—	—	—	—	—
2024–25	Tucson Roadrunners	AHL	55	20	23	43	54	3	1	1	2	5
2025–26	Utah Mammoth	NHL	2	0	0	0	0	—	—	—	—	—
2025–26	Tucson Roadrunners	AHL	56	19	20	39	24	—	—	—	—	—
NHL totals			53	3	9	12	4	—	—	—	—	—

=== International ===
Year	Team	Event	Result	GP	G	A	Pts	PIM
2008	Ontario	U17	1st place, gold medalist(s)	6	5	2	7	12
Junior totals				6	5	2	7	12

== Awards and honours ==
Award	Year	Ref
OHL
Leo Lalonde Memorial Trophy	2012	
Mickey Renaud Captain's Trophy	2012	
Third All-Star Team	2012	
AHL
All-Star Game	2013, 2019	
