= Landon Ferraro =

Canadian ice hockey player (born 1991)

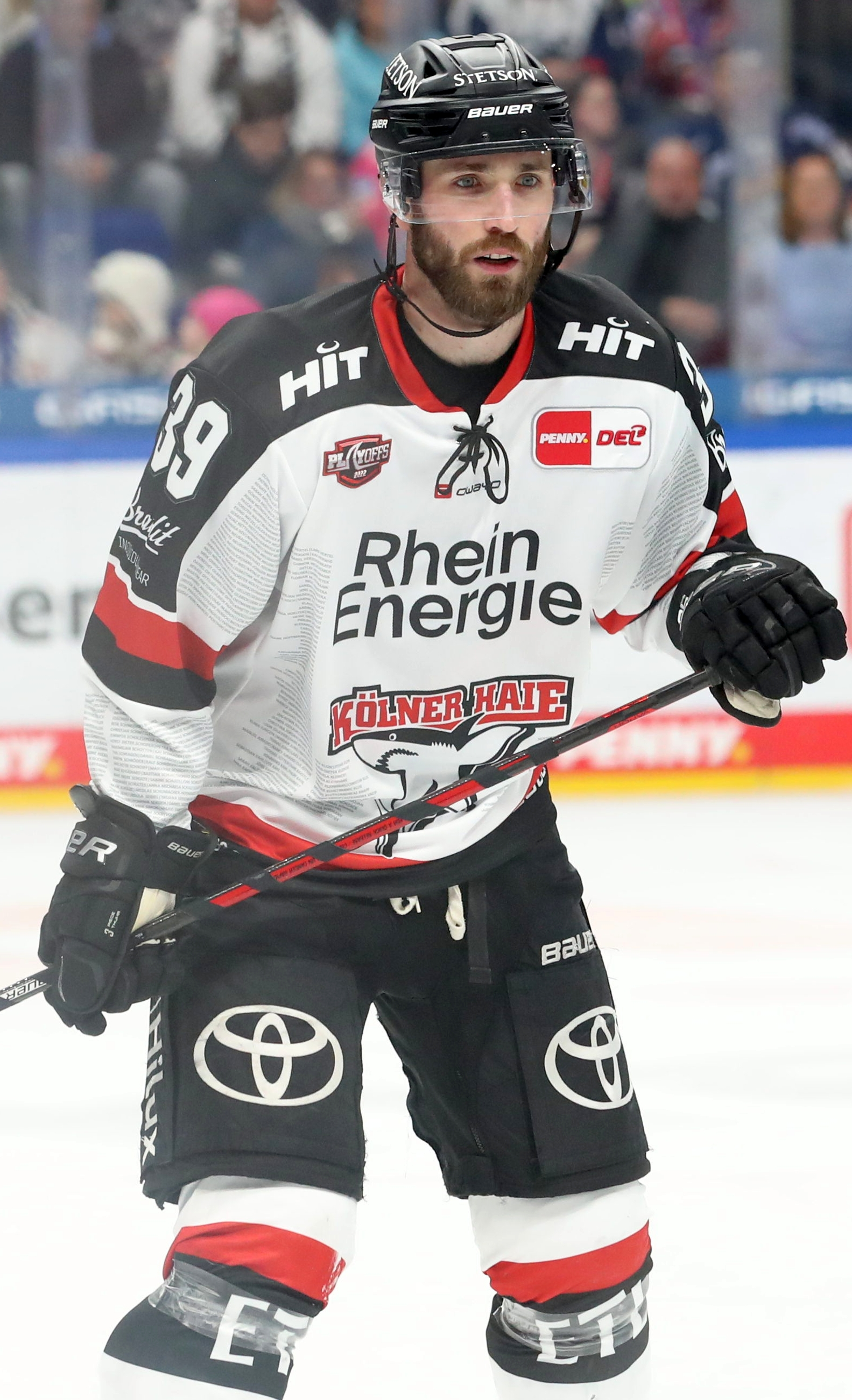
- Ferraro with the Kölner Haie in April 2022
- Born: August 8, 1991 (age 35) Trail, British Columbia, Canada
- Height: 6 ft 0 in (183 cm)
- Weight: 176 lb (80 kg; 12 st 8 lb)
- Position: Centre
- Shot: Right
- Played for: Detroit Red Wings; Boston Bruins; Minnesota Wild; Eisbären Berlin; Kölner Haie
- National team: Canada
- NHL draft: 32nd overall, 2009; Detroit Red Wings
- Playing career: 2011–2023

Landon Christopher Ferraro (born August 8, 1991) is a Canadian former professional ice hockey centre and current broadcaster for Winnipeg Jets broadcasts on TSN. Ferraro was drafted 32nd overall by the Detroit Red Wings in the 2009 NHL entry draft, with whom he began his NHL career.

== Playing career ==
=== Junior ===
Ferraro was drafted second overall by the Red Deer Rebels in the 2006 WHL Bantam Draft.

During the 2008–09 season, Ferraro was the leading scorer for the Red Deer Rebels in his second WHL season while playing on a Rebels team that finished last in the Central Division, missing the WHL playoffs. He recorded 37 goals and 18 assists in 68 games.

During the 2009–10 season, Ferraro missed time early in the season due to a knee injury. He recorded 16 goals and 30 assists in 53 games. The much-improved Rebels made the WHL playoffs after finishing fourth in the Central Division. Ferraro skated in three of the four games in the series against Saskatoon and was scoreless.

On July 26, 2010, Ferraro was traded by the Red Deer Rebels to the Everett Silvertips in exchange for Byron Froese and a conditional fifth-round draft pick in the 2012 draft. On September 23, 2010, the Everett Silvertips announced that Ferraro was named captain.

During the 2010–11 season, Ferraro endured a difficult final season in junior hockey. Following a six-game scoring streak in January, he suffered a sports hernia injury, missing the next six weeks of play. He finished the season with ten goals and 17 assists in 41 games. Everett made the playoffs after finishing fourth in the U.S. Division. Ferraro recorded three assists in the four-game series against Portland.

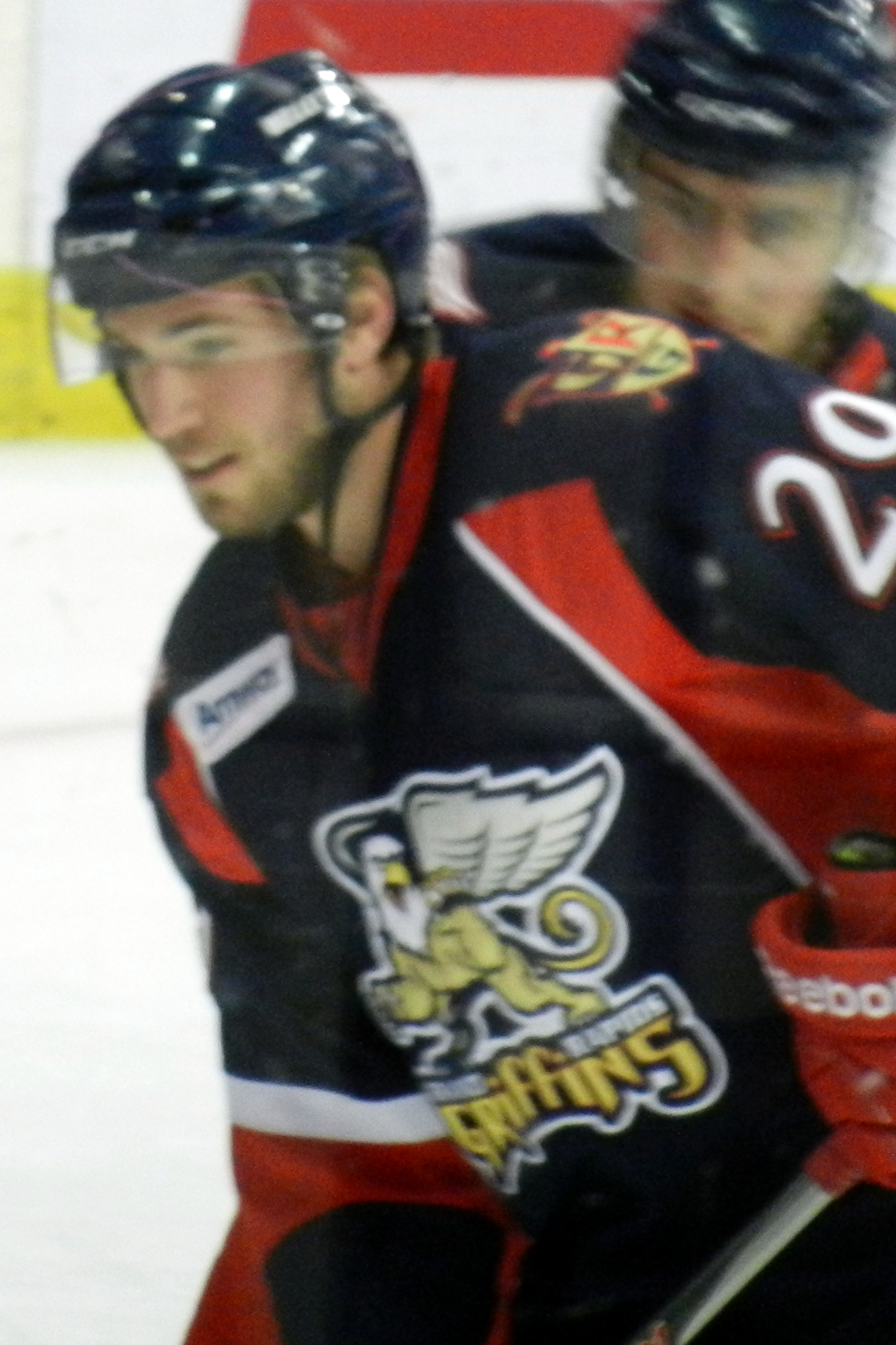
Ferraro in 2012.

=== Professional ===
On November 2, 2010, Ferraro signed a three-year entry-level contract with the Detroit Red Wings. Following the 2010 WHL Playoffs, Ferraro made his professional debut for the Grand Rapids Griffins of the American Hockey League (AHL) on April 9, 2010, in a game against the Lake Erie Monsters.

During the 2011–12 season, in his first full professional season in the AHL, Ferraro recorded nine goals and 11 assists in 56 games, ranking second among Griffins rookies with 20 points. Ferraro recorded his first professional goal on November 11, 2011.

In the 2012–13 season, Ferraro was the third-leading scorer for the Griffins. He recorded a team-high 24 goals and 23 assists in 72 games. Ferraro led the league with seven shorthanded points. The Griffins finished first in the Midwest Division and captured the Calder Cup championship. Ferraro recorded five goals and 11 assists in 24 playoff games.

During the 2013–14 season, Ferraro recorded 15 goals and 16 assists in 70 regular season games and one goal and two assists in nine playoff games for the Griffins.

On March 18, 2014, Ferraro made his NHL debut for the Detroit Red Wings in a game against the Toronto Maple Leafs. On July 25, 2014, Ferraro signed a one-year, two-way contract with the Detroit Red Wings.

On April 11, 2015, Ferraro recorded his first career NHL goal against Cam Ward of the Carolina Hurricanes.

On July 5, 2015, Ferraro signed a one-year, two-way contract with the Detroit Red Wings. During the 2015–16 season, Ferraro appeared in seven games for the Red Wings before suffering a knee injury on November 6, 2015. On November 22, Ferraro was claimed off waivers by the Boston Bruins.

In the off-season, Ferraro was not tendered a contract to remain with the Bruins, and as a free agent, he signed a one-year deal with the St. Louis Blues on July 8, 2016.

On October 8, 2016, Ferraro was placed on waivers by the St. Louis Blues. On October 9, 2016, Ferraro cleared waivers and was assigned to the Blues AHL affiliate, Chicago Wolves. He scored 15 points in 22 games with the Wolves before suffering a season-ending ACL injury which required surgery.

On July 1, 2017, having left the Blues as a free agent, Ferraro signed a two-year, two-way contract with the Minnesota Wild. In the 2017-18 season, Ferraro spent most of the year with the Iowa Wild with the exception of two October NHL games. On October 14, Ferraro scored his first goal as a member of the Wild in a 5-4 OT loss to the Columbus Blue Jackets at Xcel Energy Center.

After two seasons within the Wild organization, Ferraro left as a free agent to later sign his first contract abroad in the 2019–20 season. He agreed to a one-year deal with German club, Eisbären Berlin of the DEL, on October 11, 2019. In 40 regular season games with Berlin, Ferraro contributed with 12 goals and 21 points before the season was cancelled due to the COVID-19 pandemic.

As a free agent, Ferraro continued his career in Germany, initially signing a two-month contract with Löwen Frankfurt of the DEL2 on November 16, 2020. He produced 5 assists through 9 games with Frankfurt before concluding his contract to return to the DEL for the remainder of the 2020–21 season with Kölner Haie on January 15, 2021.

== International play ==
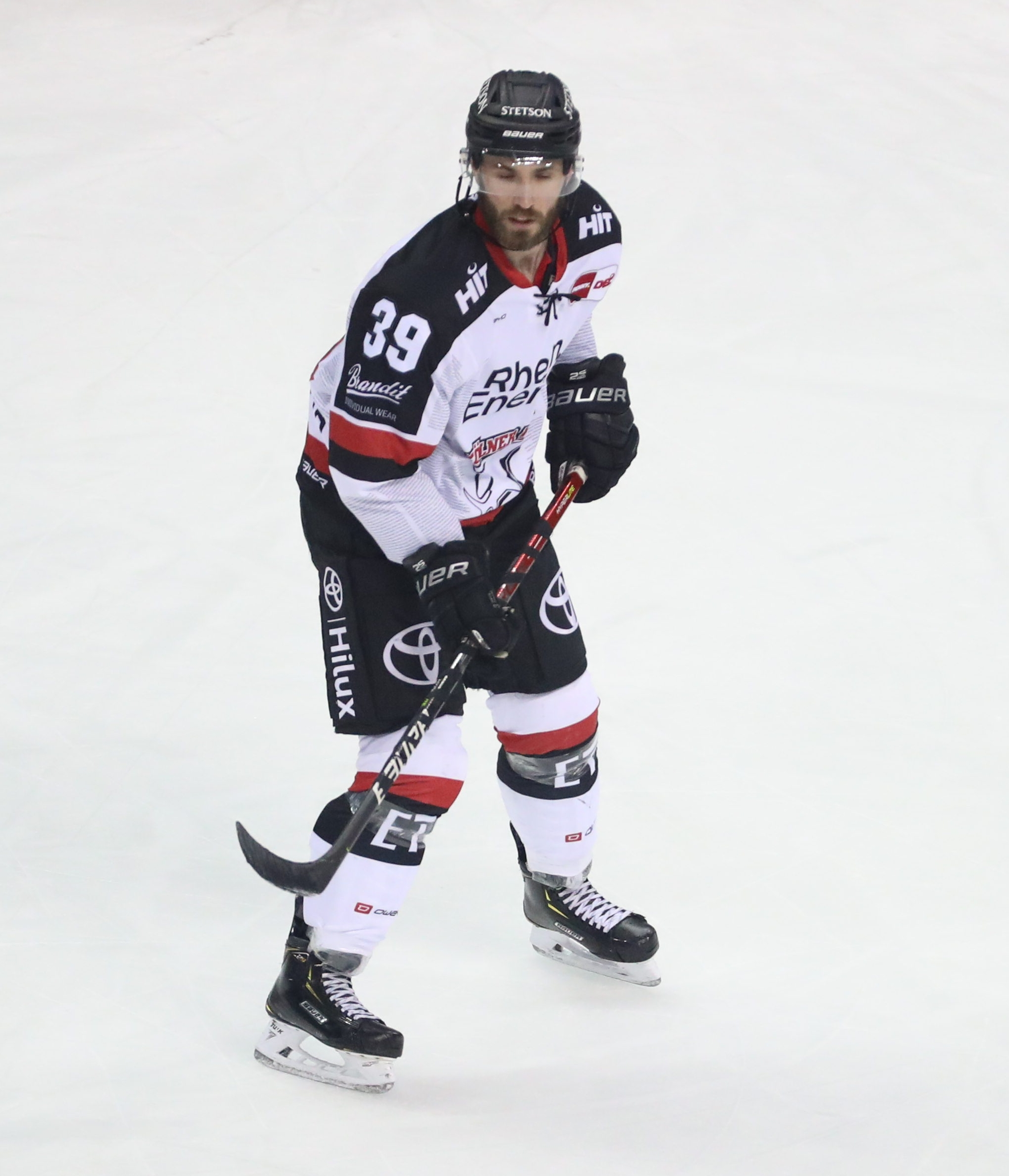
Landon Ferraro (2021)

Ferraro made his international debut for Canada Pacific at the 2008 World U-17 Hockey Challenge, where he recorded two goals and two assists in six games.

Ferraro represented Canada at the 2009 IIHF World U18 Championships. He skated in five of six games for Canada at the IIHF World U18 Championship, where he recorded two goals and two assists. Canada won its first four games but finished fourth after losing to the US in the semifinals and Finland in the bronze medal game.

In January 2022, Ferraro was selected to play for Team Canada at the 2022 Winter Olympics.

== Broadcasting ==
Following the conclusion of his playing career in 2023, Ferraro transitioned into hockey broadcasting. He joined Sportsnet as an analyst on Vancouver Canucks television broadcasts for two seasons.

On August 31, 2026, it was reported that Ferraro would become the colour commentator for Winnipeg Jets broadcasts on TSN, succeeding Kevin Sawyer, who moved to Sportsnet as the colour commentator for the Calgary Flames.

== Personal life ==
Ferraro is the son of the longtime NHL veteran and current TSN Analyst Ray Ferraro. Ferraro was born in Trail, British Columbia and lived in the suburbs of New York City, Los Angeles, and Atlanta before moving to the Vancouver suburb of Burnaby with his mother, Tracey, following his parents' divorce. Ferraro has an older brother who played goalie and two younger paternal half-brothers.

== Career statistics ==
=== Regular season and playoffs ===
			Regular season					Playoffs
Season	Team	League	GP	G	A	Pts	PIM	GP	G	A	Pts	PIM
2006–07	Red Deer Rebels	WHL	4	0	0	0	0	1	0	0	0	0
2007–08	Red Deer Rebels	WHL	54	13	11	24	65	—	—	—	—	—
2008–09	Red Deer Rebels	WHL	68	37	18	55	99	—	—	—	—	—
2009–10	Red Deer Rebels	WHL	53	16	30	46	55	3	0	0	0	2
2009–10	Grand Rapids Griffins	AHL	2	0	0	0	0	—	—	—	—	—
2010–11	Everett Silvertips	WHL	41	10	17	27	51	4	0	3	3	13
2011–12	Grand Rapids Griffins	AHL	56	9	11	20	47	—	—	—	—	—
2012–13	Grand Rapids Griffins	AHL	72	24	23	47	44	24	5	11	16	11
2013–14	Grand Rapids Griffins	AHL	70	15	16	31	52	9	1	2	3	2
2013–14	Detroit Red Wings	NHL	4	0	0	0	2	—	—	—	—	—
2014–15	Grand Rapids Griffins	AHL	70	27	15	42	61	—	—	—	—	—
2014–15	Detroit Red Wings	NHL	3	1	0	1	0	7	0	0	0	2
2015–16	Detroit Red Wings	NHL	10	0	0	0	7	—	—	—	—	—
2015–16	Boston Bruins	NHL	58	5	5	10	20	—	—	—	—	—
2016–17	Chicago Wolves	AHL	22	7	8	15	12	—	—	—	—	—
2017–18	Iowa Wild	AHL	50	11	12	23	31	—	—	—	—	—
2017–18	Minnesota Wild	NHL	2	1	0	1	0	—	—	—	—	—
2018–19	Iowa Wild	AHL	12	2	3	5	14	—	—	—	—	—
2019–20	Eisbären Berlin	DEL	40	12	9	21	22	—	—	—	—	—
2020–21	Löwen Frankfurt	DEL2	9	0	5	5	12	—	—	—	—	—
2020–21	Kölner Haie	DEL	27	10	1	11	16	—	—	—	—	—
2021–22	Kölner Haie	DEL	49	15	26	41	25	5	1	1	2	6
2022–23	Kölner Haie	DEL	29	6	7	13	23	6	0	1	1	13
AHL totals			354	95	88	183	261	33	6	13	19	13
NHL totals			77	7	5	12	29	7	0	0	0	2

=== International ===
Year	Team	Event	Result	GP	G	A	Pts	PIM
2008	Canada Pacific	U17	4th	6	2	2	4	6
2009	Canada	U18	4th	5	2	2	4	2
2022	Canada	OG	6th	1	0	0	0	0
Junior totals				11	4	4	8	8
Senior totals				1	0	0	0	0

== Awards and honours ==
Award	Year
AHL
Calder Cup (Grand Rapids Griffins)	2013
Yanick Dupre Memorial Award	2019
