= Tommi Kivistö =

Finnish ice hockey player (born 1991)

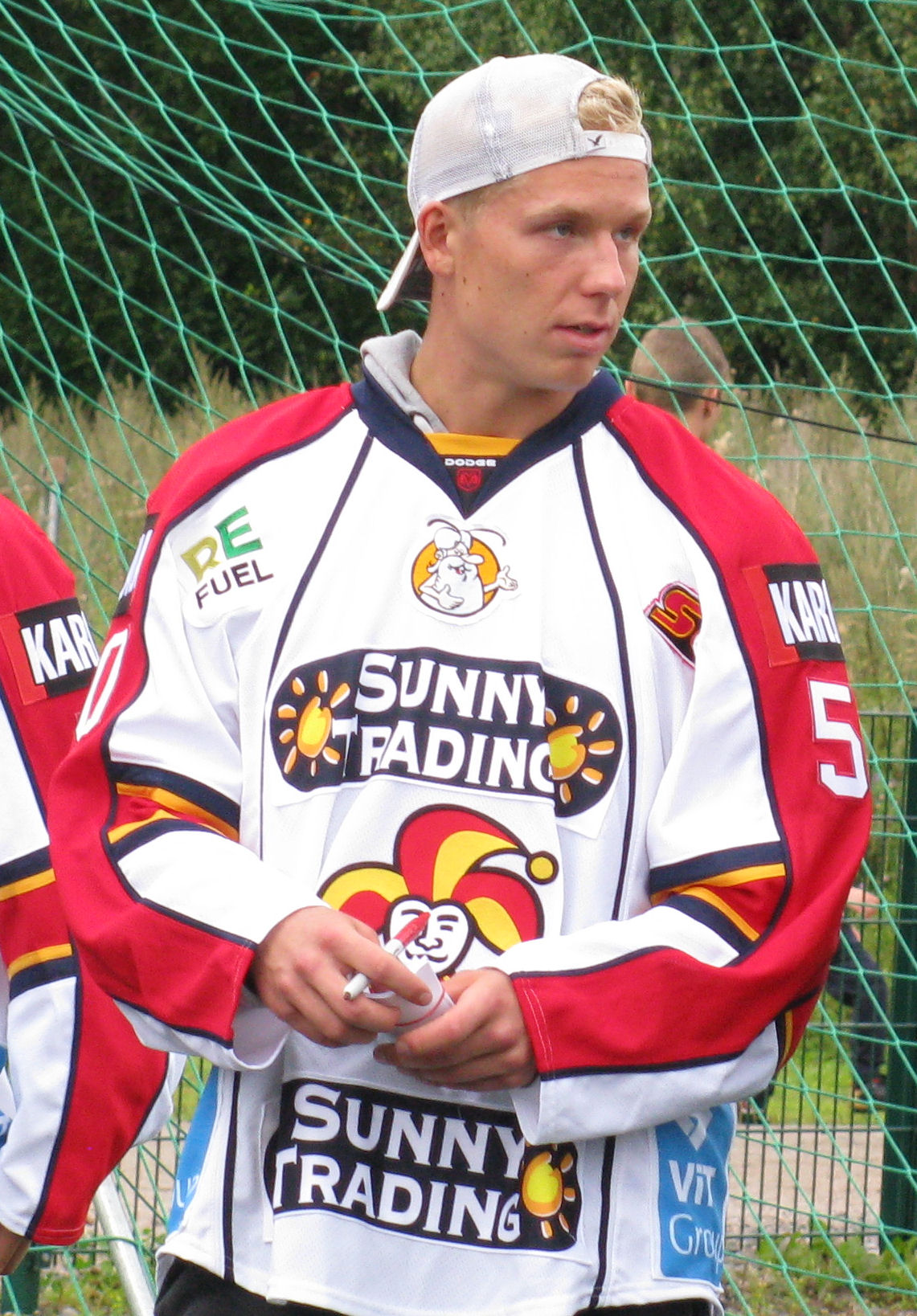
- Born: June 7, 1991 (age 35) Vantaa, Finland
- Height: 6 ft 2 in (188 cm)
- Weight: 201 lb (91 kg; 14 st 5 lb)
- Position: Defence
- Shoots: Left
- KHL team Former teams: Jokerit; Charlotte Checkers; Ilves; Avtomobilist Yekaterinburg
- National team: Finland
- NHL draft: 208th overall, 2009; Carolina Hurricanes
- Playing career: 2009–present

Tommi Kivistö (born June 7, 1991) is a Finnish professional ice hockey defenceman. He is currently playing for Jokerit of the Kontinental Hockey League (KHL).

== Playing career ==
Kivisto initially played junior then professionally in his native Finland for Jokerit in the SM-liiga. He was drafted 208th overall in the 2009 NHL entry draft by the Carolina Hurricanes. Prior to the 2011–12 season with Jokerit, he was signed to a three-year entry-level contract with the Hurricanes on June 1, 2011.

Kivisto played two seasons in the KHL with Russian club, Avtomobilist Yekaterinburg, before his rights were traded in opting to return to original club, Jokerit on a two-year contract on May 30, 2017.

== Career statistics ==
=== Regular season and playoffs ===
			Regular season					Playoffs
Season	Team	League	GP	G	A	Pts	PIM	GP	G	A	Pts	PIM
2006–07	Jokerit	FIN U18	19	0	1	1	10	3	0	0	0	2
2007–08	Jokerit	FIN U18	26	6	10	16	50	4	0	3	3	4
2007–08	Jokerit	FIN U20	9	2	0	2	4	4	0	3	3	2
2008–09	Red Deer Rebels	WHL	65	1	21	22	49	—	—	—	—	—
2009–10	Jokerit	FIN U20	18	2	5	7	58	2	0	0	0	0
2009–10	Jokerit	SM-l	22	0	2	2	12	3	0	0	0	0
2009–10	Kiekko–Vantaa	Mestis	2	0	0	0	2	—	—	—	—	—
2010–11	Jokerit	FIN U20	5	0	6	6	8	—	—	—	—	—
2010–11	Jokerit	SM-l	38	0	5	5	22	7	0	0	0	16
2010–11	Kiekko–Vantaa	Mestis	5	1	2	3	0	—	—	—	—	—
2011–12	Jokerit	SM-l	26	0	4	4	8	—	—	—	—	—
2011–12	Kiekko-Vantaa	Mestis	20	5	7	12	22	4	1	1	2	2
2012–13	Florida Everblades	ECHL	48	4	11	15	59	12	1	5	6	18
2012–13	Charlotte Checkers	AHL	17	0	2	2	12	—	—	—	—	—
2013–14	Ilves	Liiga	56	4	11	15	32	—	—	—	—	—
2014–15	Ilves	Liiga	58	6	21	27	55	2	0	0	0	2
2015–16	Avtomobilist Yekaterinburg	KHL	60	1	6	7	34	6	0	1	1	0
2016–17	Avtomobilist Yekaterinburg	KHL	57	2	3	5	23	—	—	—	—	—
2017–18	Jokerit	KHL	55	2	4	6	28	11	0	0	0	25
2018–19	Jokerit	KHL	59	1	8	9	42	6	0	2	2	2
2019–20	Jokerit	KHL	57	0	3	3	73	6	0	1	1	4
2020–21	Jokerit	KHL	39	2	7	9	26	4	0	0	0	4
2021–22	Jokerit	KHL	43	4	9	13	12	—	—	—	—	—
Liiga totals			200	10	43	53	129	12	0	0	0	18
KHL totals			370	12	40	52	238	33	0	4	4	35

Medal record

Representing Finland

Ice hockey

World Championships
Silver medal – second place	2016 Russia	
Silver medal – second place	2014 Minsk	

IIHF U18 Championships
Bronze medal – third place	2009 Fargo-Moorhead	

=== International ===
Year	Team	Event	Result	GP	G	A	Pts	PIM
2008	Finland	U17	6th	5	2	2	4	10
2008	Finland	WJC18	6th	6	1	2	3	8
2009	Finland	WJC	7th	6	1	0	1	6
2009	Finland	WJC18	3rd place, bronze medalist(s)	6	0	3	3	22
2010	Finland	WJC	5th	6	0	1	1	0
2011	Finland	WJC	6th	6	0	1	1	6
2014	Finland	WC	2nd place, silver medalist(s)	10	1	0	1	6
2016	Finland	WC	2nd place, silver medalist(s)	6	1	0	1	0
2018	Finland	OG	6th	4	0	0	0	0
2018	Finland	WC	5th	8	0	2	2	2
Junior totals				35	4	9	13	52
Senior totals				28	2	2	4	8
