= Mikael Aaltonen =

Finnish ice hockey player

- Born: 12 January 1991 (age 35) Turku, Finland
- Height: 5 ft 10 in (178 cm)
- Weight: 187 lb (85 kg; 13 st 5 lb)
- Position: Defence
- Shot: Left
- Played for: TPS
- Playing career: 2009–2014

Mikael Aaltonen (born 12 January 1991) is a Finnish ice hockey player who played professionally in Finland for TPS of the SM-liiga.

== Career statistics ==
			Regular season					Playoffs
Season	Team	League	GP	G	A	Pts	PIM	GP	G	A	Pts	PIM
2005–06	HC TPS U16	U16 SM-sarja	9	0	1	1	20	—	—	—	—	—
2006–07	HC TPS U16	U16 SM-sarja Q	7	2	8	10	16	—	—	—	—	—
2006–07	HC TPS U16	U16 SM-sarja	9	5	9	14	20	1	0	0	0	18
2006–07	HC TPS U18	U18 SM-sarja	19	1	7	8	28	—	—	—	—	—
2007–08	HC TPS U18	U18 SM-sarja	21	2	6	8	40	—	—	—	—	—
2007–08	HC TPS U20	U20 SM-liiga	12	1	0	1	8	—	—	—	—	—
2008–09	HC TPS U20	U20 SM-liiga	41	5	9	14	84	12	2	3	5	16
2009–10	HC TPS U20	U20 SM-liiga	28	2	9	11	72	—	—	—	—	—
2009–10	HC TPS	SM-liiga	10	1	0	1	6	—	—	—	—	—
2009–10	TUTO Hockey	Mestis	7	0	1	1	4	—	—	—	—	—
2009–10	Suomi U20	Mestis	7	0	1	1	12	—	—	—	—	—
2010–11	HC TPS U20	U20 SM-liiga	24	4	11	15	52	—	—	—	—	—
2010–11	HC TPS	SM-liiga	2	0	0	0	10	—	—	—	—	—
2010–11	Suomi U20	Mestis	6	0	1	1	2	—	—	—	—	—
2010–11	KooKoo	Mestis	2	0	0	0	0	—	—	—	—	—
2010–11	TUTO Hockey	Mestis	14	0	0	0	4	—	—	—	—	—
2011–12	TUTO Hockey	Mestis	38	0	6	6	58	4	0	0	0	4
2012–13	TUTO Hockey	Mestis	46	8	13	21	77	11	0	4	4	26
2013–14	Vaasan Sport	Mestis	52	2	8	10	50	7	0	0	0	2
SM-liiga totals			12	1	0	1	16	—	—	—	—	—
Mestis totals			172	10	30	40	207	22	0	4	4	32
