= Jere Laaksonen =

Finnish ice hockey player

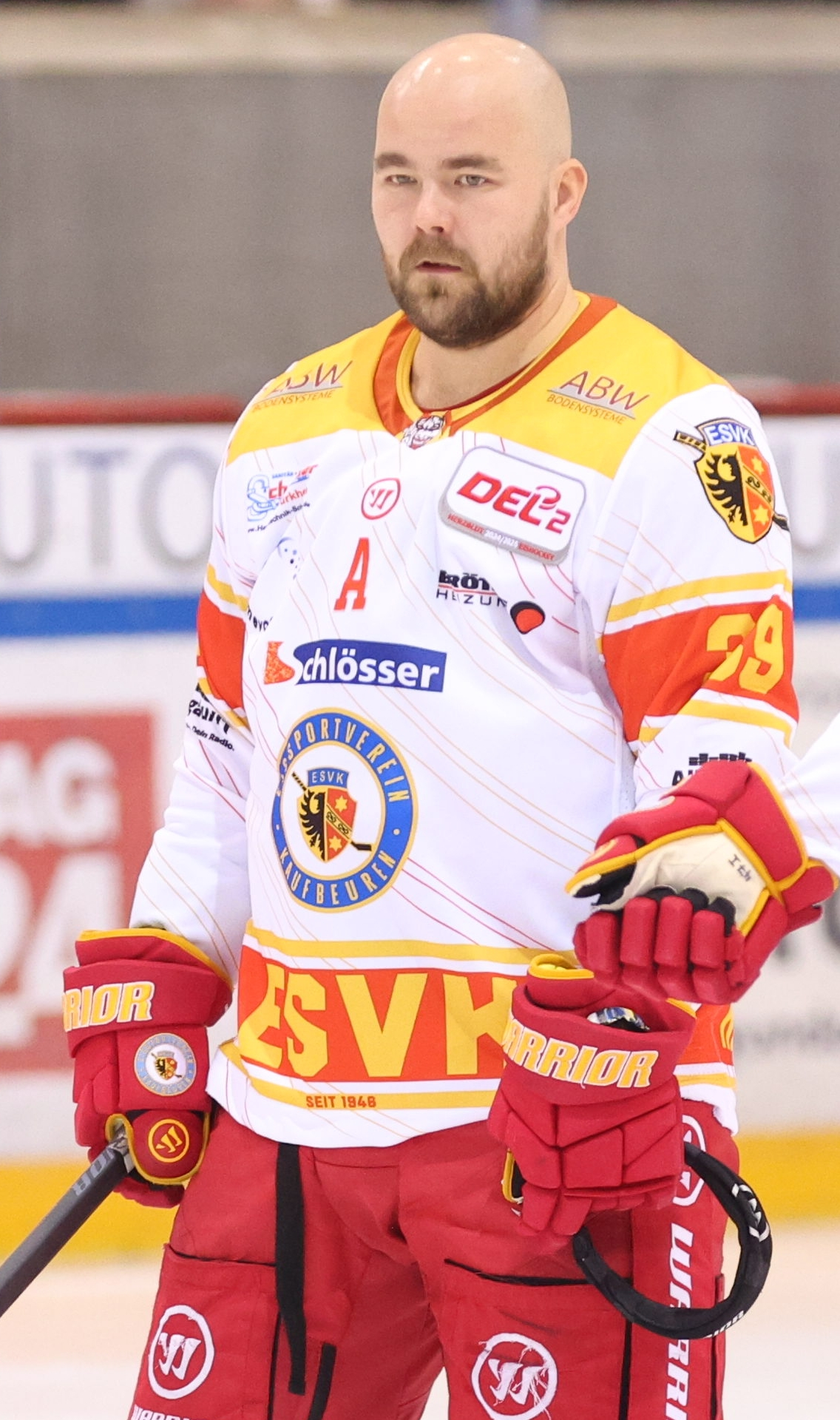
- Jere Laaksonen in 2024
- Born: February 28, 1991 (age 34); Eurajoki, Finland
- Height: 5 ft 8 in (173 cm)
- Weight: 157 lb (71 kg; 11 st 3 lb)
- Position: Centre
- Shoots: Left
- SM-liiga team: Lukko
- NHL draft: Undrafted
- Playing career: 2010–present

Jere Laaksonen (born February 28, 1991) is a Finnish ice hockey player.

Laaksonen made his SM-liiga debut playing with Lukko during the 2011–12 SM-liiga season.
