= Stanislav Bocharov =

Russian professional ice hockey player

- Born: June 20, 1991 (age 34) Khabarovsk, Russian SFSR, Soviet Union
- Height: 5 ft 11 in (180 cm)
- Weight: 196 lb (89 kg; 14 st 0 lb)
- Position: Left wing
- Shoots: Left
- KHL team Former teams: Free agent Ak Bars Kazan; HC Yugra; HC Lada Togliatti; Admiral Vladivostok; HC Sochi; Torpedo Nizhny Novgorod; Avtomobilist Yekaterinburg; Salavat Yulaev Ufa; Amur Khabarovsk; Barys Astana
- Playing career: 2009–present

Stanislav Bocharov (born June 20, 1991) is a Russian professional ice hockey player who is currently an unrestricted free agent. He most recently played for Barys Astana of the Kontinental Hockey League (KHL). He previously played with Avtomobilist Yekaterinburg joining from Torpedo Nizhny Novgorod, after agreeing to a two-year contract as a free agent on 3 May 2020.
