= Vladimir Malinovsky =

Russian ice hockey player

- Born: June 9, 1991 (age 34) Tyumen, Russia
- Height: 6 ft 0 in (183 cm)
- Weight: 203 lb (92 kg; 14 st 7 lb)
- Position: Right wing
- Shoots: Left
- KHL team: Metallurg Magnitogorsk
- NHL draft: Undrafted
- Playing career: 2012–present

Vladimir Malinovsky (Владимир Малиновский, born June 9, 1991) is a Russian ice hockey player. He currently plays for Metallurg Magnitogorsk of the Kontinental Hockey League (KHL).

Malinowski made his Continental Hockey League (KHL) debut playing for Metallurgy Magnitogorsk during the 2012–13 KHL season.
