= 2011–12 OHL season =

- League: Ontario Hockey League
- Sport: Hockey
- Duration: Preseason; Sept. 2, 2011 – Sept. 18, 2011; Regular season Sept. 21, 2011 – Mar. 18, 2012; Playoffs; Mar. 22, 2012 – May 11, 2012
- Teams: 20
- TV partner(s): Rogers TV, TVCogeco

Draft
- Top draft pick: Aaron Ekblad
- Picked by: Barrie Colts

Regular season
- Hamilton Spectator Trophy: London Knights (5)
- Season MVP: Michael Houser (London Knights)
- Top scorer: Michael Sgarbossa (Sudbury Wolves)

Playoffs
- Playoffs MVP: Austin Watson (Knights)
- Finals champions: London Knights (2)
- Runners-up: Niagara IceDogs

OHL seasons
- 2010–11 2012–13

2011–12 CHL season
- League: Canadian Hockey League
- Sport: Hockey
- Duration: OHL; September 2011 – March 2012; QMJHL; September 2011 – March 2012; WHL; September 2011 – March 2012
- Teams: 59
- TV partner(s): RDS; Rogers Sportsnet; Rogers TV; Shaw TV
- Season MVP: Brendan Shinnimin (Tri-City Americans) (WHL)
- Top scorer: Brendan Shinnimin (Tri-City Americans) (WHL)

Memorial Cup
- Finals champions: Shawinigan Cataractes (QMJHL) (1st title)
- Runners-up: London Knights (OHL)

The 2011–12 OHL season was the 32nd season of the Ontario Hockey League. Twenty teams played 68 games each during the regular season schedule, which started on September 21, 2011 and ended on March 18, 2012. The playoffs began on Thursday March 22, 2012 and concluded on Friday May 11, 2012. The London Knights won the J. Ross Robertson Cup for the second time in franchise history. London secured a berth in the 2012 Memorial Cup hosted by the Shawinigan Cataractes of the QMJHL.

== Regular season ==
=== Final standings ===
Note: DIV = Division; GP = Games played; W = Wins; L = Losses; OTL = Overtime losses; SL = Shootout losses; GF = Goals for; GA = Goals against; PTS = Points; x = clinched playoff berth; y = clinched division title; z = clinched conference title

=== Eastern conference ===
Rank	Team	DIV	GP	W	L	OTL	SL	PTS	GF	GA
1	z-Niagara IceDogs	Central	68	47	18	0	3	97	291	169
2	y-Ottawa 67's	East	68	40	20	5	3	88	268	216
3	x-Barrie Colts	Central	68	40	23	3	2	85	248	210
4	x-Brampton Battalion	Central	68	36	22	3	7	82	202	188
5	x-Sudbury Wolves	Central	68	36	26	4	2	78	242	239
6	x-Mississauga St. Michael's Majors	Central	68	33	28	1	6	73	201	219
7	x-Belleville Bulls	East	68	35	32	1	0	71	200	221
8	x-Oshawa Generals	East	68	31	30	4	3	69	242	241
9	Peterborough Petes	East	68	27	34	3	4	61	219	281
10	Kingston Frontenacs	East	68	19	41	3	5	46	188	290

=== Western conference ===
Rank	Team	DIV	GP	W	L	OTL	SL	PTS	GF	GA
1	z-London Knights	Midwest	68	49	18	0	1	99	277	178
2	y-Plymouth Whalers	West	68	47	18	2	1	97	279	205
3	x-Kitchener Rangers	Midwest	68	42	24	1	1	86	253	211
4	x-Sarnia Sting	West	68	34	27	3	4	75	243	235
5	x-Saginaw Spirit	West	68	33	27	1	7	74	259	259
6	x-Owen Sound Attack	Midwest	68	32	29	3	4	71	234	220
7	x-Guelph Storm	Midwest	68	31	31	2	4	68	234	238
8	x-Windsor Spitfires	West	68	29	32	5	2	65	213	258
9	Sault Ste. Marie Greyhounds	West	68	29	33	2	4	64	227	272
10	Erie Otters	Midwest	68	10	52	3	3	26	169	338

=== Scoring leaders ===
Note: GP = Games played; G = Goals; A = Assists; Pts = Points; PIM = Penalty minutes

Player	Team	GP	G	A	Pts	PIM
Michael Sgarbossa	Sudbury Wolves	66	47	55	102	68
Tyler Toffoli	Ottawa 67's	65	52	48	100	22
Tanner Pearson	Barrie Colts	60	37	54	91	37
Shane Prince	Ottawa 67's	57	43	47	90	12
Andrew Agozzino	Niagara IceDogs	67	40	48	88	67
Nick Cousins	Sault Ste. Marie Greyhounds	65	35	53	88	88
Charles Sarault	Sarnia Sting	68	20	67	87	32
Freddie Hamilton	Niagara IceDogs	61	35	51	86	31
Seth Griffith	London Knights	68	45	40	85	49
Mike Halmo	Owen Sound Attack	66	40	45	85	162
Vincent Trocheck	Saginaw Spirit	65	29	56	85	65

=== Leading goaltenders ===
Note: GP = Games played; Mins = Minutes played; W = Wins; L = Losses: OTL = Overtime losses; SL = Shootout losses; GA = Goals Allowed; SO = Shutouts; GAA = Goals against average

Player	Team	GP	Mins	W	L	OTL	SL	GA	SO	Sv%	GAA
Mark Visentin	Niagara IceDogs	42	2407	30	9	0	2	80	10	0.926	1.99
Matěj Machovský	Brampton Battalion	42	2420	24	13	0	4	95	5	0.902	2.36
Michael Houser	London Knights	62	3698	46	15	0	1	152	6	0.925	2.47
Malcolm Subban	Belleville Bulls	39	2258	25	14	0	0	94	3	0.923	2.50
Matt Mahalak	Plymouth Whalers	30	1625	19	8	0	0	72	3	0.923	2.66

== Playoffs ==
Conference quarterfinals	Conference semifinals
1	Niagara	4
8	Oshawa	2
1	Niagara	4
4	Brampton	0
2	Ottawa	4
7	Belleville	2
Eastern conference
3	Barrie	4
6	Mississauga	2
2	Ottawa	4
3	Barrie	3
4	Brampton	4
5	Sudbury	0
Note: Pairings are re-seeded after the first round.
1	London	4
8	Windsor	0
1	London	4
5	Saginaw	2
2	Plymouth	4
7	Guelph	2
Western conference
3	Kitchener	4
6	Owen Sound	1
2	Plymouth	3
3	Kitchener	4
4	Sarnia	2
5	Saginaw	4

Conference finals
1	Niagara	4
2	Ottawa	1
1	London	4
3	Kitchener	0

Finals
E1	Niagara	1
W1	London	4

=== Conference quarterfinals ===
==== Eastern conference quarterfinals ====
===== (1) Niagara IceDogs vs. (8) Oshawa Generals =====
March 22	Niagara IceDogs	8 – 2	Oshawa Generals	Gatorade Garden City Complex	Recap
1:43 - Alex Friesen (1); 2:44 - pp - Ryan Strome (1); 10:43 - pp - Brett Ritchie (1); 14:35 - Andrew Agozzino (1); 15:49 - Trevor Petersen (1)		First period	No scoring
7:31 - pp - Tom Kühnhackl (1); 7:49 - pp - Alex Friesen (2)		Second period	Emerson Clark (1) - 13:17; Christian Thomas (1) - 15:35
1:30 - pp - Alex Friesen (3)		Third period	No scoring
Mark Visentin (33 saves / 35 shots)		Goalie stats	Kevin Bailie (13 saves / 18 shots); Daniel Altshuller (30 saves / 33 shots)

March 23	Oshawa Generals	1 – 6	Niagara IceDogs	General Motors Centre	Recap
No scoring		First period	8:01 - Dougie Hamilton (1)
No scoring		Second period	2:19 - Freddie Hamilton (1); 14:11 - pp - Andrew Agozzino (2); 18:52 - Jesse Graham (1)
Cole Cassels (1) - sh - 16:39		Third period	3:29 - pp - Steven Shipley (1); 14:42 - Steven Shipley (2)
Kevin Bailie (32 saves / 38 shots)		Goalie stats	Mark Visentin (25 saves / 26 shots)

March 25	Niagara IceDogs	4 – 6	Oshawa Generals	Gatorade Garden City Complex	Recap
Dougie Hamilton (2) - 5:33		First period	11:32 - pp - Scott Laughton (1)
No scoring		Second period	5:04 - Boone Jenner (1); 11:42 - pp - Boone Jenner (2)
Steven Shipley (3) - 5:34; Ryan Strome (2) - pp - 11:37; Ryan Strome (3) - 12:42		Third period	16:21 - Scott Laughton (2); 16:29 - Lucas Lessio (1); 19:28 - sh - en - Boone Jenner (3)
Mark Visentin (28 saves / 33 shots)		Goalie stats	Daniel Altshuller (46 saves / 50 shots)

March 28	Oshawa Generals	5 – 3	Niagara IceDogs	General Motors Centre	Recap
0:44 - Lucas Lessio (2); 10:38 - Christian Thomas (2)		First period	No scoring
No scoring		Second period	Andrew Agozzino (3) - pp - 8:28; Steven Shipley (4) - 14:26
3:15 - Lucas Lessio (3); 7:00 - Boone Jenner (4); 17:45 - Andy Andreoff (1)		Third period	Steven Shipley (5) - sh - 15:52
Daniel Altshuller (44 saves / 47 shots)		Goalie stats	Mark Visentin (18 saves / 23 shots)

March 31	Niagara IceDogs	5 – 3	Oshawa Generals	Gatorade Garden City Complex	Recap
3:22 - David Pacan (1)		First period	Matt Petgrave (1) - pp - 5:04
7:23 - Myles Doan (1)		Second period	Julian Melchiori (1) - 16:15
1:30 - Carter Verhaeghe (1); 2:30 - Ryan Strome (4); 10:50 - pp - Ryan Strome (5)		Third period	Nicklas Jensen (1) - 15:05
Mark Visentin (22 saves / 25 shots)		Goalie stats	Daniel Altshuller (54 saves / 59 shots)

April 1	Oshawa Generals	1 – 4	Niagara IceDogs	General Motors Centre	Recap
16:18 - pp - Julian Melchiori (2)		First period	Alex Friesen (4) - 8:53
No scoring		Second period	No scoring
No scoring		Third period	David Pacan (2) - sh - 1:36; David Pacan (3) - 16:01; Brock Beukeboom (1) - en - 18:40
Daniel Altshuller (28 saves / 31 shots)		Goalie stats	Mark Visentin (27 saves / 28 shots)

Niagara wins series 4 – 2

===== (2) Ottawa 67's vs. (7) Belleville Bulls =====
March 22	Ottawa 67's	3 – 2	OT	Belleville Bulls	J. Benson Cartage Centre	Recap
16:44 - pp - Tyler Toffoli (1)		First period		Luke Judson (1) - 19:13
9:11 - Steven Janes (1)		Second period		Adam Payerl (1) - 16:08
No scoring		Third period		No scoring
2:02 - Tyler Toffoli (2)		First overtime period		No scoring
Petr Mrázek (28 saves / 30 shots)		Goalie stats		Malcolm Subban (40 saves / 43 shots)

March 23	Ottawa 67's	4 – 2	Belleville Bulls	J. Benson Cartage Centre	Recap
2:21 - Brett Gustavsen (1); 9:53 - Sean Monahan (1)		First period	Michael Curtis (1) - 5:18
No scoring		Second period	No scoring
4:59 - Sean Monahan (2); 19:23 - en - Shane Prince (1)		Third period	Joseph Cramarossa (1) - 10:31
Petr Mrázek (44 saves / 46 shots)		Goalie stats	Malcolm Subban (29 saves / 32 shots)

March 25	Belleville Bulls	4 – 3	OT	Ottawa 67's	Yardmen Arena	Recap
No scoring		First period		No scoring
1:00 - Daniil Zharkov (1)		Second period		Tyler Graovac (1) - 5:06; Brett Gustavsen (2) - 5:50; Sean Monahan (3) - sh - 9:53
4:43 - sh - Michael Curtis (2); 5:41 - Jake Worrad (1)		Third period		No scoring
0:14 - Jordan Mayer (1)		First overtime period		No scoring
Malcolm Subban (32 saves / 35 shots)		Goalie stats		Petr Mrázek (36 saves / 40 shots)

March 27	Belleville Bulls	4 – 3	OT	Ottawa 67's	Yardmen Arena	Recap
0:52 - Michael Curtis (3); 3:23 - pp - Brendan Gaunce (1)		First period		No scoring
No scoring		Second period		No scoring
8:30 - Austen Brassard (1)		Third period		Tyler Toffoli (3) - pp - 11:07; Ryan Van Stralen (1) - 16:14; Jake Cardwell (1) - 18:22
7:46 - Brady Austin (1)		First overtime period		No scoring
Malcolm Subban (38 saves / 41 shots)		Goalie stats		Petr Mrázek (40 saves / 44 shots)

March 30	Ottawa 67's	5 – 2	Belleville Bulls	J. Benson Cartage Centre	Recap
12:44 - sh - Shane Prince (2)		First period	Joseph Cramarossa (2) - 5:18
13:20 - Shane Prince (3)		Second period	No scoring
12:26 - Sean Monahan (4); 15:13 - Tyler Toffoli (4); 19:02 - en - Shane Prince (4)		Third period	Stephen Silas (1) - 9:27
Petr Mrázek (32 saves / 34 shots)		Goalie stats	Malcolm Subban (24 saves / 28 shots)

April 2	Belleville Bulls	1 – 2	Ottawa 67's	Yardmen Arena	Recap
No scoring		First period	No scoring
3:22 - Garrett Hooey (1)		Second period	Tyler Toffoli (5) - 18:08
No scoring		Third period	Tyler Toffoli (6) - 5:51
Malcolm Subban (35 saves / 37 shots)		Goalie stats	Petr Mrázek (31 saves / 32 shots)

Ottawa wins series 4 – 2

===== (3) Barrie Colts vs. (6) Mississauga St. Michael's Majors =====
March 22	Barrie Colts	3 – 1	Mississauga St. Michael's Majors	Barrie Molson Centre	Recap
13:04 - Ivan Telegin (1)		First period	Kristoff Kontos (1) - 1:39
14:27 - pp - Ivan Telegin (2)		Second period	No scoring
19:11 - en - Erik Bradford (1)		Third period	No scoring
Mathias Niederberger (26 saves / 27 shots)		Goalie stats	Brandon Maxwell (33 saves / 35 shots)

March 23	Mississauga St. Michael's Majors	4 – 0	Barrie Colts	Hershey Centre	Recap
Spenser Cobbold (1) - 9:00		First period	No scoring
Stuart Percy (1) - 1:03; Kristoff Kontos (2) - pp - 3:03; Riley Brace (1) - 3:46		Second period	No scoring
No scoring		Third period	No scoring
Brandon Maxwell (26 saves / 26 shots)		Goalie stats	Mathias Niederberger (20 saves / 24 shots); Alex Fotinos (17 saves / 17 shots)

March 26	Barrie Colts	4 – 0	Mississauga St. Michael's Majors	Barrie Molson Centre	Recap
No scoring		First period	No scoring
Ivan Telegin (3) - pp - 6:33; Ryan O'Connor (1) - 10:16		Second period	No scoring
Anthony Camara (1) - pp - 14:21; Mark Scheifele (1) - pp - 17:00		Third period	No scoring
Mathias Niederberger (22 saves / 22 shots)		Goalie stats	Brandon Maxwell (31 saves / 35 shots)

March 27	Mississauga St. Michael's Majors	3 – 2	Barrie Colts	Hershey Centre	Recap
14:29 - pp - Mika Partanen (1)		First period	Ivan Telegin (4) - 12:51; Erik Bradford (2) - 14:43
5:43 - Riley Brace (2)		Second period	No scoring
13:37 - Trevor Carrick (1)		Third period	No scoring
Brandon Maxwell (27 saves / 29 shots)		Goalie stats	Mathias Niederberger (29 saves / 32 shots)

March 31	Barrie Colts	2 – 1	Mississauga St. Michael's Majors	Barrie Molson Centre	Recap
15:20 - sh - Steven Beyers (1)		First period	Dylan DeMelo (1) - pp - 10:57
No scoring		Second period	No scoring
7:48 - Norm Ezekiel (1)		Third period	No scoring
Mathias Niederberger (26 saves / 27 shots)		Goalie stats	Brandon Maxwell (26 saves / 28 shots)

April 2	Mississauga St. Michael's Majors	2 – 3	Barrie Colts	Hershey Centre	Recap
No scoring		First period	No scoring
5:55 - sh - Jamie Wise (1); 17:01 - Mika Partanen (2)		Second period	Aaron Ekblad (1) - 7:39; Colin Behenna (1) - pp - 19:00
No scoring		Third period	No scoring
No scoring		Overtime	Anthony Camara (2) - 19:32
Brandon Maxwell (38 saves / 41 shots)		Goalie stats	Mathias Niederberger (44 saves / 46 shots)

Barrie wins series 4 – 2

===== (4) Brampton Battalion vs. (5) Sudbury Wolves =====
March 23	Brampton Battalion	4 – 0	Sudbury Wolves	Powerade Centre	Recap
1:39 - Matt MacLeod (1); 6:33 - pp - Matt MacLeod (2)		First period	No scoring
11:23 - Marcus McIvor (1)		Second period	No scoring
13:18 - Matt MacLeod (3)		Third period	No scoring
Matěj Machovský (19 saves / 19 shots)		Goalie stats	Johan Mattsson (33 saves / 37 shots)

March 25	Brampton Battalion	4 – 2	Sudbury Wolves	Powerade Centre	Recap
No scoring		First period	Josh Leivo (1) - 19:17
0:58 - pp - Phil Lane (1); 8:19 - pp - Sam Carrick (1)		Second period	No scoring
13:59 - Phil Lane (2); 19:25 - en - Phil Lane (3)		Third period	Nathan Pancel (1) - 8:45
Matěj Machovský (27 saves / 30 shots)		Goalie stats	Johan Mattsson (12 saves / 14 shots)

March 27	Sudbury Wolves	1 – 6	Brampton Battalion	Sudbury Arena	Recap
No scoring		First period	Sam Carrick (2) - sh - 6:17; Ian Watters (1) - pp - 19:43
No scoring		Second period	Dylan Blujus (1) - 2:54; Jamie Lewis (1) - 3:52; Barclay Goodrow (1) - sh - 10:36; Sam Carrick (3) - 18:56
5:41 - sh - Michael Sgarbossa (1)		Third period	No scoring
Johan Mattsson (13 saves / 18 shots); Joel Vienneau (10 saves / 11 shots)		Goalie stats	Matěj Machovský (14 saves / 15 shots)

March 28	Sudbury Wolves	3 – 4	2OT	Brampton Battalion	Sudbury Arena	Recap
3:14 - pp - Josh Leivo (2)		First period		No scoring
15:25 - pp - Michael Sgarbossa (2)		Second period		Ian Watters (2) - sh - 8:29; Jamie Lewis (2) - 13:11
18:10 - pp - Derek Schoenmakers (1)		Third period		Derek Froats (1) - 11:13
No scoring		Second overtime period		Cameron Wind (1) - 14:17
Joel Vienneau (41 saves / 45 shots)		Goalie stats		Matěj Machovský (39 saves / 42 shots)

Brampton wins series 4 – 0

==== Western conference quarterfinals ====
===== (1) London Knights vs. (8) Windsor Spitfires =====
March 23	London Knights	3 – 0	Windsor Spitfires	John Labatt Centre	Recap
7:13 - Vladislav Namestnikov (1); 12:21 - Bo Horvat (1)		First period	No scoring
No scoring		Second period	No scoring
2:53 - pp - Jared Knight (1)		Third period	No scoring
Michael Houser (21 saves / 21 shots)		Goalie stats	Jaroslav Pavelka (33 saves / 36 shots)

March 25	Windsor Spitfires	2 – 3	London Knights	WFCU Centre	Recap
Nick Czinder (1) - 11:53; Nick Czinder (2) - pp - 15:15		First period	No scoring
No scoring		Second period	18:49 - pp - Seth Griffith (1); 19:38 - pp - Seth Griffith (2)
No scoring		Third period	9:57 - Austin Watson (1)
Jaroslav Pavelka (29 saves / 32 shots)		Goalie stats	Michael Houser (19 saves / 21 shots)

March 26	London Knights	3 – 2	Windsor Spitfires	John Labatt Centre	Recap
Seth Griffith (3) - pp - 8:57		First period	No scoring
Chris Tierney (1) - 10:56; Seth Griffith (4) - pp - 18:25		Second period	7:23 - Kerby Rychel (1)
No scoring		Third period	1:23 - pp - Jordan Maletta (1)
Michael Houser (33 saves / 35 shots)		Goalie stats	Jaroslav Pavelka (35 saves / 38 shots)

March 29	Windsor Spitfires	3 – 8	London Knights	WFCU Centre	Recap
16:22 - Kerby Rychel (2)		First period	Ryan Rupert (1) - 4:09; Brett Welychka (1) - 7:56
No scoring		Second period	Greg McKegg (1) - 1:10; Ryan Rupert (2) - pp - 3:18; Chris Tierney (2) - 7:12
13:05 - Chris Marchese (1); 19:26 - Michael Clarke		Third period	Ryan Rupert (3) - pp - 14:49; Chris Tierney (3) - sh - 17:18; Andreas Athanasiou (1) - sh - 18:11
Jaroslav Pavelka (25 saves / 30 shots); John Cullen (7 saves / 10 shots)		Goalie stats	Michael Houser (35 saves / 37 shots); Tyson Teichmann (1 save / 2 shots)

London wins series 4 – 0

===== (2) Plymouth Whalers vs. (7) Guelph Storm =====
March 23	Plymouth Whalers	2 – 4	Guelph Storm	Compuware Arena	Recap
No scoring		First period	Jason Dickinson (1) - pp - 16:55
16:22 - sh - Alex Aleardi (1)		Second period	Brock McGinn (1) - 1:04; Andrey Pedan (1) - pp - 4:07
3:18 - pp - J.T. Miller (1)		Third period	Francis Menard (1) - en - 19:38
Scott Wedgewood (26 saves / 29 shots)		Goalie stats	Garret Sparks (45 saves / 47 shots)

March 25	Guelph Storm	5 – 3	Plymouth Whalers	Sleeman Centre	Recap
Scott Kosmachuk (1) - pp - 5:18; Cody McNaughton (1) - 17:58; Jason Dickinson (2) - 18:23		First period	No scoring
No scoring		Second period	4:59 - pp - Stefan Noesen (1); 5:27 - Colin MacDonald (1)
Francis Menard (2) - 10:13; Tanner Richard (1) - en - 19:55		Third period	5:03 - pp - Stefan Noesen (2)
Garret Sparks (22 saves / 25 shots)		Goalie stats	Scott Wedgewood (28 saves / 32 shots); Matt Mahalak (1 save / 1 shot)

March 27	Plymouth Whalers	7 – 1	Guelph Storm	Compuware Arena	Recap
Stefan Noesen (3) - pp - 4:19; Stefan Noesen (4) - 6:08; Alex Aleardi (2) - pp - 8:53		First period	13:54 - pp - Scott Kosmachuk (2)
Tom Wilson (1) - pp - 3:24; Michael Whaley (1) - 16:20; Andy Bathgate (1) - pp - 19:29		Second period	No scoring
Andy Bathgate (2) - pp - 11:41		Third period	No scoring
Scott Wedgewood (33 saves / 34 shots)		Goalie stats	Garret Sparks (39 saves / 46 shots)

March 29	Guelph Storm	2 – 5	Plymouth Whalers	Sleeman Centre	Recap
18:32 - pp - Zack Mitchell (1)		First period	Tom Wilson (2) - 9:55
3:04 - Cody McNaughton (2)		Second period	Dario Trutmann (1) - pp - 1:06
No scoring		Third period	Mitchell Heard (1) - pp - 6:00; Alex Aleardi (3) - 13:55; Alex Aleardi (4) - 17:00
Garret Sparks (29 saves / 34 shots)		Goalie stats	Scott Wedgewood (31 saves / 33 shots)

March 31	Plymouth Whalers	9 – 3	Guelph Storm	Compuware Arena	Recap
2:11 - sh - Stefan Noesen (5); 10:09 - sh - Rickard Rakell (1); 13:52 - Stefan Noesen (6); 14:56 - pp - Mitchell Heard (2); 17:29 - Stefan Noesen (7); 17:59 - Mitchell Heard (3)		First period	Francis Menard (3) - 7:12; Kyle Pereira (1) - 12:09
14:52 - Jamie Devane (1); 17:45 - sh - Andy Bathgate (3)		Second period	Zack Mitchell (2) - pp - 11:48
11:58 - sh - Jamie Devane (2)		Third period	No scoring
Scott Wedgewood (31 saves / 34 shots)		Goalie stats	Garret Sparks (9 saves / 14 shots); Brandon Foote (23 saves / 27 shots)

April 1	Guelph Storm	1 – 2	OT	Plymouth Whalers	Sleeman Centre	Recap
No scoring		First period		No scoring
No scoring		Second period		Tom Wilson (3) - pp - 10:06
4:03 - Jason Dickinson (3)		Third period		No scoring
No scoring		First overtime period		J.T. Miller (2) - 5:58
Garret Sparks (34 saves / 36 shots)		Goalie stats		Scott Wedgewood (35 saves / 36 shots)

Plymouth wins series 4 – 2

===== (3) Kitchener Rangers vs. (6) Owen Sound Attack =====
March 23	Kitchener Rangers	6 – 2	Owen Sound Attack	Kitchener Auditorium	Recap
11:09 - Tyler Randell (1)		First period	Cameron Brace (1) - 4:41; Gemel Smith (1) - 13:29
4:27 - Ben Thomson (1); 7:37 - sh - Tobias Rieder (1)		Second period	No scoring
9:33 - pp - Tobias Rieder (2); 10:27 - pp - Andrew Crescenzi (1); 12:06 - Tyler Randell (2)		Third period	No scoring
John Gibson (34 saves / 36 shots)		Goalie stats	Jordan Binnington (36 saves / 42 shots)

March 24	Owen Sound Attack	2 – 3	Kitchener Rangers	Bayshore Community Centre	Recap
Kyle Hope (1) - 8:33		First period	8:56 - Max Iafrate (1)
No scoring		Second period	No scoring
11:32 - pp - Cameron Brace (2)		Third period	1:26 - pp - Radek Faksa (1); 17:48 - Tobias Rieder (3)
Scott Stajcer (25 saves / 28 shots)		Goalie stats	John Gibson (35 saves / 37 shots)

March 26	Kitchener Rangers	4 – 1	Owen Sound Attack	Kitchener Auditorium	Recap
Michael Catenacci (1) - pp - 18:10		First period	No scoring
Cody Sol (1) - pp - 1:06; Michael Catenacci (2) - 9:06		Second period	15:17 - Chris Bigras (1)
Zach Lorentz (1) - 5:45		Third period	No scoring
John Gibson (43 saves / 44 shots)		Goalie stats	Jordan Binnington (27 saves / 31 shots)

March 28	Owen Sound Attack	6 – 5	OT	Kitchener Rangers	Bayshore Community Centre	Recap
8:58 - Kyle Hope (2); 17:40 - Zach Nastasiuk (1)		First period		Tobias Rieder (4) - pp - 5:46
8:47 - Daniel Zweep (1); 11:03 - pp - Chris Bigras (2)		Second period		Zach Lorentz (2) - 1:52; Andrew Crescenzi (2) - pp - 14:47
1:52 - sh - Daniel Catenacci (1)		Third period		Tobias Rieder (5) - 6:52; Cody Sol (2) - 19:01
5:49 - Kyle Hope (3)		First overtime period		No scoring
Scott Stajcer (36 saves / 41 shots)		Goalie stats		John Gibson (18 saves / 22 shots); Franky Palazzese (21 saves / 23 shots)

March 30	Kitchener Rangers	4 – 2	Owen Sound Attack	Kitchener Auditorium	Recap
1:15 - pp - Andrew Crescenzi (3); 16:29 - pp - Andrew Crescenzi (4)		First period	Cameron Brace (3) - pp - 5:22
7:31 - pp - Tobias Rieder (6); 11:51 - Tobias Rieder (7)		Second period	Cameron Brace (4) - sh - 10:24
No scoring		Third period	No scoring
John Gibson (51 saves / 53 shots)		Goalie stats	Scott Stajcer (23 saves / 27 shots)

Kitchener wins series 4 – 1

===== (4) Sarnia Sting vs. (5) Saginaw Spirit =====
March 23	Sarnia Sting	1 – 5	Saginaw Spirit	RBC Centre	Recap
19:19 - pp - Alex Galchenyuk (1)		First period	No scoring
No scoring		Second period	Brandon Saad (1) - 5:32; Carlos Amestoy (1) - 6:49; Brandon Saad (2) - 11:12; Brandon Archibald (1) - pp - 19:44
No scoring		Third period	Garret Ross (1) - 1:53
J.P. Anderson (28 saves / 33 shots)		Goalie stats	Jake Paterson (26 saves / 27 shots)

March 24	Saginaw Spirit	3 – 4	OT	Sarnia Sting	Dow Event Center	Recap
Carlos Amestoy (2) - 6:57		First period		No scoring
Garret Ross (2) - pp - 5:33		Second period		8:17 - pp - Nail Yakupov (1)
Josh Shalla (1) - 5:10		Third period		1:35 - pp - Ryan Spooner (1); 5:31 - Tony DeAngelo (1)
No scoring		First overtime period		3:52 - Tyler Brown (1)
Jake Paterson (33 saves / 37 shots)		Goalie stats		J.P. Anderson (43 saves / 46 shots)

March 26	Sarnia Sting	6 – 5	OT	Saginaw Spirit	RBC Centre	Recap
Alex Galchenyuk (2) - 1:04; Ludvig Rensfeldt (1) - 15:39		First period		16:01 - Garret Ross (3)
Connor Murphy (1) - pp - 3:56; Craig Hottot (1) - 13:44		Second period		6:35 - pp - Brandon Saad (3); 8:39 - Steven Strong (1); 11:44 - Vincent Trocheck (1)
Reid Boucher (1) - 9:09		Third period		0:06 - Eric Locke (1)
Ludvig Rensfeldt (2) - 15:51		First overtime period		No scoring
J.P. Anderson (31 saves / 36 shots)		Goalie stats		Jake Paterson (24 saves / 30 shots)

March 28	Saginaw Spirit	4 – 3	OT	Sarnia Sting	Dow Event Center	Recap
3:16 - Garret Ross (4); 12:09 - Josh Shalla (2)		First period		Brett Thompson (1) - 17:26
No scoring		Second period		Nail Yakupov (2) - 17:23
12:12 - Brandon Saad (4)		Third period		Nathan Chiarlitti (1) - 11:07
1:18 - Josh Shalla (3)		First overtime period		No scoring
Jake Paterson (21 saves / 24 shots)		Goalie stats		J.P. Anderson (46 saves / 50 shots)

March 30	Sarnia Sting	2 – 5	Saginaw Spirit	RBC Centre	Recap
No scoring		First period	Dalton Young (1) - 0:50; Michael Fine (1) - 2:49; Brandon Saad (5) - 15:35
15:20 - Brett Thompson (2)		Second period	Dalton Young (2) - 1:13
14:08 - pp - Brett Thompson (3)		Third period	Brandon Saad (6) - en - 18:54
J.P. Anderson (34 saves / 38 shots)		Goalie stats	Jake Paterson (36 saves / 38 shots)

March 31	Saginaw Spirit	3 – 1	Sarnia Sting	Dow Event Center	Recap
11:18 - sh - Justin Kea (1)		First period	No scoring
14:01 - pp - Vincent Trocheck (2)		Second period	No scoring
6:13 - pp - Michael Fine (2)		Third period	Reid Boucher (2) - 3:11
Jake Paterson (23 saves / 24 shots)		Goalie stats	J.P. Anderson (15 saves / 16 shots); Brandon Hope (15 saves / 17 shots)

Saginaw wins series 4 – 2

=== Conference semifinals ===
==== Eastern conference semifinals ====
===== (1) Niagara IceDogs vs. (4) Brampton Battalion =====
April 6	Niagara IceDogs	2 – 1	OT	Brampton Battalion	Gatorade Garden City Complex	Recap
16:09 - Ryan Strome (6)		First period		No scoring
No scoring		Second period		Marcus McIvor (2) - 17:26
No scoring		Third period		No scoring
13:21 - David Pacan (4)		First overtime period		No scoring
Mark Visentin (44 saves / 45 shots)		Goalie stats		Matěj Machovský (34 saves / 36 shots)

April 8	Brampton Battalion	1 – 3	Niagara IceDogs	Powerade Centre	Recap
No scoring		First period	16:44 - Alex Friesen (5)
No scoring		Second period	No scoring
Sam Carrick (4) - 10:13		Third period	2:42 - Myles Doan (2); 18:53 - David Pacan (5)
Matěj Machovský (21 saves / 24 shots)		Goalie stats	Mark Visentin (22 saves / 23 shots)

April 10	Niagara IceDogs	6 – 3	Brampton Battalion	Gatorade Garden City Complex	Recap
Tom Kühnhackl (2) - 15:34		First period	7:33 - Matt MacLeod (4); 11:55 - sh - Phil Lane (4)
Alex Friesen (6) - sh - 1:24; Freddie Hamilton (2) - 7:18; Tom Kühnhackl (3) - pp - 13:40		Second period	10:46 - pp - Zach Bell (1)
Freddie Hamilton (3) - sh - 8:47; Freddie Hamilton (4) - 15:16		Third period	No scoring
Mark Visentin (27 saves / 30 shots)		Goalie stats	Matěj Machovský (23 saves / 29 shots)

April 12	Brampton Battalion	1 – 3	Niagara IceDogs	Powerade Centre	Recap
No scoring		First period	Brock Beukeboom (2) - 10:11; Andrew Agozzino (4) - 15:01
19:35 - pp - Patrik Machač (1)		Second period	No scoring
No scoring		Third period	Tom Kühnhackl (4) - 5:17
Matěj Machovský (18 saves / 21 shots)		Goalie stats	Mark Visentin (34 saves / 35 shots)

Niagara wins series 4 – 0

===== (2) Ottawa 67's vs. (3) Barrie Colts =====
April 6	Ottawa 67's	5 – 1	Barrie Colts	J. Benson Cartage Centre	Recap
No scoring		First period	No scoring
8:15 - pp - Tyler Toffoli (7); 11:16 - Shane Prince (5); 14:42 - Shane Prince (6); 18:03 - pp - Tyler Graovac (2)		Second period	Mark Scheifele (2) - 10:10
19:40 - pp - Remy Giftopoulos (1)		Third period	No scoring
Petr Mrázek (21 saves / 22 shots)		Goalie stats	Mathias Niederberger (34 saves / 39 shots)

April 8	Ottawa 67's	2 – 3	2OT	Barrie Colts	J. Benson Cartage Centre	Recap
No scoring		First period		Mark Scheifele (3) - 18:41
No scoring		Second period		Ivan Telegin (5) - sh - 7:52
5:59 - Jake Cardwell (2); 8:36 - Tyler Toffoli (8)		Third period		No scoring
No scoring		Second overtime period		9:53 - Colin Behenna (2)
Petr Mrázek (39 saves / 42 shots)		Goalie stats		Mathias Niederberger (65 saves / 67 shots)

April 10	Barrie Colts	5 – 2	Ottawa 67's	Barrie Molson Centre	Recap
6:35 - Daniel Erlich (1); 16:08 - Daniel Erlich (2)		First period	Mike Cazzola (1) - pp - 2:32
3:17 - pp - Alex Lepkowski (1)		Second period	No scoring
12:19 - pp - Mark Scheifele (4); 15:00 - Josh MacDonald (1)		Third period	Marc Zanetti (1) - 8:13
Mathias Niederberger (27 saves / 29 shots)		Goalie stats	Petr Mrázek (32 saves / 37 shots)

April 12	Barrie Colts	3 – 2	Ottawa 67's	Barrie Molson Centre	Recap
No scoring		First period	Remy Giftopoulos (2) - 2:17
5:37 - Derek Hartwick (1)		Second period	Sean Monahan (5) - 7:40
0:20 - Aaron Ekblad (2); 10:00 - pp - Colin Behenna (3)		Third period	No scoring
Mathias Niederberger (32 saves / 34 shots)		Goalie stats	Petr Mrázek (18 saves / 21 shots)

April 13	Ottawa 67's	2 – 1	Barrie Colts	J. Benson Cartage Centre	Recap
No scoring		First period	No scoring
7:47 - pp - Cody Ceci (1); 19:51 - Tyler Toffoli (9)		Second period	Daniel Erlich (3) - 17:55
No scoring		Third period	No scoring
Petr Mrázek (31 saves / 32 shots)		Goalie stats	Mathias Niederberger (43 saves / 45 shots)

April 15	Barrie Colts	2 – 3	Ottawa 67's	Barrie Molson Centre	Recap
No scoring		First period	Tyler Toffoli (10) - 3:07; Steven Janes (2) - 13:21
18:28 - Gregg Sutch (1)		Second period	Tyler Graovac (3) - 2:26
2:52 - Alex Lepkowski (2)		Third period	No scoring
Mathias Niederberger (27 saves / 30 shots)		Goalie stats	Petr Mrázek (25 saves / 27 shots)

April 17	Ottawa 67's	4 – 3	OT	Barrie Colts	J. Benson Cartage Centre	Recap
No scoring		First period		Gregg Sutch (2) - 2:52
11:41 - Dalton Smith (1)		Second period		No scoring
12:31 - Steven Janes (3); 19:35 - pp - Sean Monahan (6)		Third period		Josh MacDonald (2) - 8:49; Mark Scheifele (5) - 19:51
2:09 - Brett Gustavsen (3)		First overtime period		No scoring
Petr Mrázek (28 saves / 31 shots)		Goalie stats		Mathias Niederberger (40 saves / 44 shots)

Ottawa wins series 4 – 3

==== Western conference Semifinals ====
===== (1) London Knights vs. (5) Saginaw Spirit =====
April 6	London Knights	5 – 2	Saginaw Spirit	John Labatt Centre	Recap
2:31 - Jarred Tinordi (1); 17:30 - Matt Rupert (1)		First period	Eric Locke (2) - pp - 4:47
19:20 - pp - Greg McKegg (2)		Second period	No scoring
5:34 - pp - Austin Watson (2); 19:00 - en - Austin Watson (3)		Third period	Brad Walch (1) - 9:27
Michael Houser (29 saves / 31 shots)		Goalie stats	Jake Paterson (32 saves / 36 shots)

April 8	Saginaw Spirit	5 – 2	London Knights	Dow Event Center	Recap
No scoring		First period	No scoring
Vincent Trocheck (3) - pp - 10:48; Garret Ross (5) - sh - 19:15		Second period	15:04 - pp - Austin Watson (4)
Brandon Archibald (2) - 6:09; Brandon Saad (7) - pp - 9:37; Brandon Saad (8) - pp - 19:16		Third period	4:57 - pp - Greg McKegg (3)
Jake Paterson (20 saves / 22 shots)		Goalie stats	Michael Houser (26 saves / 31 shots)

April 9	London Knights	2 – 5	Saginaw Spirit	John Labatt Centre	Recap
Matt Rupert (2) - 2:50		First period	9:32 - pp - Carlos Amestoy (3)
Jared Knight (2) - 9:34		Second period	10:13 - Garret Ross (6); 16:13 - Michael Fine (3)
No scoring		Third period	7:56 - Michael Fine (4); 11:31 - pp - Michael Fine (5)
Michael Houser (29 saves / 34 shots)		Goalie stats	Jake Paterson (42 saves / 44 shots)

April 11	Saginaw Spirit	2 – 5	London Knights	Dow Event Center	Recap
No scoring		First period	Josh Anderson (1) - 2:18; Austin Watson (5) - 4:09; Vladislav Namestnikov (2) - 6:27; Matt Rupert (3) - 19:15
1:18 - pp - Vincent Trocheck (4); 13:43 - Vincent Trocheck (5)		Second period	No scoring
No scoring		Third period	Greg McKegg (4) - en - 18:36
Jake Paterson (4 saves / 7 shots); Clint Windsor (23 saves / 24 shots)		Goalie stats	Michael Houser (25 saves / 27 shots)

April 13	London Knights	2 – 1	OT	Saginaw Spirit	John Labatt Centre	Recap
2:59 - Seth Griffith (5)		First period		No scoring
No scoring		Second period		No scoring
No scoring		Third period		Brandon Archibald (3) - 3:36
4:58 - Vladislav Namestnikov (3)		First overtime period		No scoring
Michael Houser (35 saves / 36 shots)		Goalie stats		Jake Paterson (46 saves / 48 shots)

April 14	Saginaw Spirit	3 – 5	London Knights	Dow Event Center	Recap
No scoring		First period	Tommy Hughes (1) - 4:07; Jared Knight (3) - 12:06
3:23 - pp - Josh Shalla (4); 12:11 - Terry Trafford (1); 8:45 - sh - Michael Fine (6)		Second period	Austin Watson (6) - 6:28; Jarred Tinordi (2) - 11:51
No scoring		Third period	Olli Määttä (1) - 13:41
Jake Paterson (17 saves / 22 shots)		Goalie stats	Michael Houser (30 saves / 33 shots)

London wins series 4 – 2

===== (2) Plymouth Whalers vs. (3) Kitchener Rangers =====
April 6	Plymouth Whalers	0 – 2	Kitchener Rangers	Compuware Arena	Recap
No scoring		First period	No scoring
No scoring		Second period	Tobias Rieder (8) - 19:32
No scoring		Third period	Ben Thomson (2) - 9:56
Scott Wedgewood (28 saves / 30 shots)		Goalie stats	John Gibson (40 saves / 40 shots)

April 8	Kitchener Rangers	0 – 2	Plymouth Whalers	Kitchener Auditorium	Recap
No scoring		First period	No scoring
No scoring		Second period	No scoring
No scoring		Third period	3:24 - Matt Mistele (1); 4:30 - Andy Bathgate (4)
John Gibson (43 saves / 45 shots)		Goalie stats	Scott Wedgewood (26 saves / 26 shots)

April 10	Plymouth Whalers	4 – 3	Kitchener Rangers	Compuware Arena	Recap
No scoring		First period	10:28 - pp - Michael Catenacci (3)
No scoring		Second period	4:13 - Michael Catenacci (4)
Tom Wilson (4) - 1:10; Austin Levi (1) - 13:28; Dario Trutmann (2) - 14:49; Alex Aleardi (5) - 18:01		Third period	19:28 - Michael Catenacci (5)
Scott Wedgewood (27 saves / 30 shots)		Goalie stats	John Gibson (37 saves / 41 shots)

April 11	Kitchener Rangers	5 – 1	Plymouth Whalers	Kitchener Auditorium	Recap
13:33 - Max Iafrate (2); 16:48 - Radek Faksa (2)		First period	Rickard Rakell (2) - 12:17
1:48 - pp - Tobias Rieder (9); 12:00 - Eric Ming (1)		Second period	No scoring
18:39 - en - Michael Catenacci (6)		Third period	No scoring
John Gibson (38 saves / 39 shots)		Goalie stats	Scott Wedgewood (35 saves / 39 shots)

April 14	Plymouth Whalers	3 – 0	Kitchener Rangers	Compuware Arena	Recap
9:47 - sh - Andy Bathgate (5)		First period	No scoring
No scoring		Second period	No scoring
11:49 - Tom Wilson (5); 18:28 - en - Tom Wilson (6)		Third period	No scoring
Scott Wedgewood (32 saves / 32 shots)		Goalie stats	John Gibson (45 saves / 47 shots)

April 15	Kitchener Rangers	4 – 2	Plymouth Whalers	Kitchener Auditorium	Recap
5:39 - pp - Ryan Murphy (1)		First period	No scoring
1:18 - pp - Ben Thomson (3)		Second period	Alex Aleardi (6) - 6:32; Tom Wilson (7) - 11:51
5:00 - Curtis Meighan (1); 19:30 - en - Cody Sol (3)		Third period	No scoring
John Gibson (41 saves / 43 shots)		Goalie stats	Scott Wedgewood (40 saves / 43 shots)

April 17	Plymouth Whalers	3 – 6	Kitchener Rangers	Compuware Arena	Recap
12:09 - Matt Mistele (2)		First period	Tyler Randell (3) - pp - 10:20; Eric Ming (2) - 17:15
2:36 - Mitchell Heard (4)		Second period	Tyler Randell (4) - pp - 16:59; Tyler Randell (5) - 19:08
14:13 - Austin Levi (2)		Third period	Tyler Randell (6) - 4:23; Tobias Rieder (10) - en - 18:39
Scott Wedgewood (25 saves / 30 shots)		Goalie stats	John Gibson (34 saves / 37 shots)

Kitchener wins series 4 – 3

=== Conference finals ===
==== Eastern conference finals ====
===== (1) Niagara IceDogs vs. (2) Ottawa 67's =====
April 20	Niagara IceDogs	2 – 1	OT	Ottawa 67's	Gatorade Garden City Complex	Recap
No scoring		First period		No scoring
No scoring		Second period		No scoring
7:04 - Tom Kühnhackl (5)		Third period		Nicholas Foglia (1) - 10:12
5:10 - Mitch Theoret (1)		First overtime period		No scoring
Mark Visentin (41 saves / 42 shots)		Goalie stats		Petr Mrázek (49 saves / 51 shots)

April 22	Niagara IceDogs	4 – 7	Ottawa 67's	Gatorade Garden City Complex	Recap
14:50 - Alex Friesen (7)		First period	Nicholas Foglia (2) - 7:39; Cody Ceci (2) - pp - 10:00; Dalton Smith (2) - sh - 12:53; Shane Prince (7) - 14:08
2:20 - pp - Brett Ritchie (2); 4:09 - Dougie Hamilton (3)		Second period	Mike Cazzola (2) - 5:09; Sean Monahan (7) - pp - 11:38
19:44 - David Pacan (6)		Third period	Jake Cardwell (3) - pp - 10:29
Mark Visentin (13 saves / 19 shots); Christopher Festarini (15 saves / 16 shots)		Goalie stats	Petr Mrázek (44 saves / 48 shots)

April 23	Ottawa 67's	2 – 5	Niagara IceDogs	J. Benson Cartage Centre	Recap
18:02 - Tyler Graovac (4)		First period	No scoring
4:16 - sh - Dalton Smith (3)		Second period	Mitch Theoret (2) - 0:20; Dougie Hamilton (4) - 13:24
No scoring		Third period	Mitch Theoret (3) - 0:13; Andrew Agozzino (5) - 1:39; Mark Visentin (1) - sh - en - 19:22
Michael Nishi (31 saves / 35 shots)		Goalie stats	Mark Visentin (22 saves / 24 shots)

April 25	Ottawa 67's	2 – 5	Niagara IceDogs	J. Benson Cartage Centre	Recap
10:08 - sh - Dalton Smith (4)		First period	No scoring
No scoring		Second period	Andrew Agozzino (6) - 17:42
4:03 - Tyler Toffoli (11)		Third period	Andrew Agozzino (7) - 6:49; David Pacan (7) - 7:41; David Pacan (8) - pp - 13:21; Freddie Hamilton (5) - pp - en - 19:54
Petr Mrázek (39 saves / 43 shots)		Goalie stats	Mark Visentin (36 saves / 38 shots)

April 27	Niagara IceDogs	3 – 2	Ottawa 67's	Gatorade Garden City Complex	Recap
2:02 - pp - Ryan Strome (7); 15:49 - Freddie Hamilton (6)		First period	Sean Monahan (8) - pp - 3:04
13:34 - Alex Friesen (8)		Second period	No scoring
No scoring		Third period	Jake Cardwell (4) - pp - 10:14
Mark Visentin (27 saves / 29 shots)		Goalie stats	Petr Mrázek (37 saves / 40 shots)

Niagara wins series 4 – 1

==== Western conference finals ====
===== (1) London Knights vs. (3) Kitchener Rangers =====
April 19	London Knights	3 – 2	OT	Kitchener Rangers	John Labatt Centre	Recap
No scoring		First period		Tobias Rieder (11) - pp - 13:52
14:58 - Max Domi (1)		Second period		Ben Thomson (4) - 16:53
14:45 - Max Domi (2)		Third period		No scoring
1:51 - Tyler Ferry (1)		First overtime period		No scoring
Michael Houser (20 saves / 22 shots)		Goalie stats		John Gibson (45 saves / 48 shots)

April 22	Kitchener Rangers	4 – 6	London Knights	Kitchener Auditorium	Recap
Ryan Murphy (2) - 19:59		First period	4:16 - Olli Määttä (2)
Tobias Rieder (12) - sh - 8:47; Tobias Rieder (13) - sh - 9:26; Michael Catenacci (7) - pp - 14:37		Second period	5:22 - Austin Watson (7)
No scoring		Third period	7:03 - Josh Anderson (2); 15:55 - sh - Seth Griffith (6); 19:10 - Scott Harrington (1); 19:47 - en - Austin Watson (8)
John Gibson (30 saves / 35 shots)		Goalie stats	Michael Houser (37 saves / 41 shots)

April 24	London Knights	5 – 2	Kitchener Rangers	John Labatt Centre	Recap
Jared Knight (4) - 1:19; Tyler Ferry (2) - 11:17		First period	11:50 - Tyler Randell (7)
Olli Määttä (3) - 6:36; Olli Maatta (4) - 6:58		Second period	13:33 - Eric Ming (3)
Ryan Rupert (4) - en - 19:25		Third period	No scoring
Michael Houser (21 saves / 23 shots)		Goalie stats	John Gibson (25 saves / 29 shots); Franky Palazzese (12 saves / 12 shots)

April 25	Kitchener Rangers	2 – 4	London Knights	Kitchener Auditorium	Recap
No scoring		First period	Olli Määttä (5) - sh - 17:20
No scoring		Second period	Ryan Rupert (5) - pp - 2:27; Seth Griffith (7) - pp - 15:18
5:51 - Ben Thomson (5); 14:18 - Cody Sol (4)		Third period	Seth Griffith (8) - en 18:45
John Gibson (46 saves / 49 shots)		Goalie stats	Michael Houser (26 saves / 28 shots)

London wins series 4 – 0

=== J. Ross Robertson Cup ===
==== (W1) London Knights vs. (E1) Niagara IceDogs ====
May 3	London Knights	2 – 3	2OT	Niagara IceDogs	John Labatt Centre	Recap
17:15 - Max Domi (3)		First period		Mitch Theoret (4) - 4:01
No scoring		Second period		Andrew Agozzino (8) - 18:23
3:00 - Seth Griffith (9)		Third period		No scoring
No scoring		Second overtime period		Dougie Hamilton (5) - 9:03
Michael Houser (51 saves / 54 shots)		Goalie stats		Mark Visentin (41 saves / 43 shots)

May 5	Niagara IceDogs	3 – 5	London Knights	Gatorade Garden City Complex	Recap
Andrew Agozzino (9) - pp - 5:14; Andrew Agozzino (10) - pp - 16:09		First period	17:59 - Jarred Tinordi (3)
Andrew Agozzino (11) - 16:26		Second period	1:46 - Ryan Rupert (6); 4:28 - Ryan Rupert (7); 13:31 - pp - Olli Määttä (6)
No scoring		Third period	19:52 - en - Ryan Rupert (8)
Mark Visentin (19 saves / 23 shots)		Goalie stats	Michael Houser (39 saves / 42 shots)

May 7	London Knights	3 – 2	Niagara IceDogs	John Labatt Centre	Recap
No scoring		First period	No scoring
Max Domi (4) - 8:05; Austin Watson (9) - pp - 18:28		Second period	7:47 - pp - Brett Ritchie (3); 16:40 - Freddie Hamilton (7)
Chris Tierney (4) - 16:32		Third period	No scoring
Michael Houser (25 saves / 27 shots)		Goalie stats	Mark Visentin (32 saves / 35 shots)

May 9	Niagara IceDogs	1 – 4	London Knights	Gatorade Garden City Complex	Recap
No scoring		First period	Ryan Rupert (9) - 3:31
No scoring		Second period	Vladislav Namestnikov (4) - pp - 7:47; Chris Tierney (5) - 13:56
6:23 - Myles Doan (3)		Third period	Matt Rupert (4) - 7:19
Mark Visentin (17 saves / 21 shots)		Goalie stats	Michael Houser (36 saves / 37 shots)

May 11	London Knights	2 – 1	Niagara IceDogs	John Labatt Centre	Recap
No scoring		First period	No scoring
12:34 - Austin Watson (10)		Second period	No scoring
1:48 - Seth Griffith (10)		Third period	Tom Kühnhackl (6) - 7:53
Michael Houser (26 saves / 27 shots)		Goalie stats	Mark Visentin (20 saves / 22 shots)

London wins series 4 – 1

=== J. Ross Robertson Cup Champions Roster ===
2011-12 London Knights
Goaltenders: (United States) 29 – Michael Houser; (Canada) 35 – Jake Patterson; (Canada) 41 – Tyson Teichmann	Defencemen: (Finland) 2 – Olli Maatta; (Canada) 3 – Brett Cook; (Canada) 6 – Scott Harrington – A; (Canada) 14 – Tommy Hughes; (Canada) 20 – Kevin Raine; (Canada) 21 – Tyler Ferry; (United States) 24 – Jarred Tinordi – C; (Canada) 39 – Kyle Flemington	Wingers: (Canada) 17 – Seth Griffith; (Canada) 26 – Colin Martin; (Canada) 46 – Matt Rupert; (Canada) 53 – Bo Horvat; (Canada) 77 – Josh Anderson; (Canada) 86 – Andreas Athanasiou; (United States) 97 – Jared Knight – A	Centres: (Canada) 16 – Max Domi; (Russia) 18 – Vladislav Namestnikov – A; (Canada) 27 – Brett Welychka; (United States) 51 – Austin Watson; (Canada) 64 – Ryan Rupert; (Canada) 71 – Chris Tierney; (Canada) 92 – Greg McKegg; Coach: (Canada) Mark Hunter; General Manager: (Canada) Mark Hunter

=== Playoff scoring leaders ===
Note: GP = Games played; G = Goals; A = Assists; Pts = Points; PIM = Penalty minutes

Player	Team	GP	G	A	Pts	PIM
Tobias Rieder	Kitchener Rangers	16	13	14	27	4
Michael Catenacci	Kitchener Rangers	16	7	19	26	26
Freddie Hamilton	Niagara IceDogs	20	7	17	24	9
Seth Griffith	London Knights	19	10	13	23	12
Ryan Strome	Niagara IceDogs	20	7	16	23	31
Olli Maatta	London Knights	19	6	17	23	2
Dougie Hamilton	Niagara IceDogs	20	5	18	23	16
Alex Friesen	Niagara IceDogs	20	8	14	22	18
Ryan Murphy	Kitchener Rangers	16	2	20	22	12
David Pacan	Niagara IceDogs	20	8	12	20	14

=== Playoff leading goaltenders ===
Note: GP = Games played; Mins = Minutes played; W = Wins; L = Losses: OTL = Overtime losses; SL = Shootout losses; GA = Goals Allowed; SO = Shutouts; GAA = Goals against average

Player	Team	GP	Mins	W	L	GA	SO	Sv%	GAA
Brandon Maxwell	Mississauga St. Michael's Majors	6	378	2	4	13	1	0.933	2.06
Michael Houser	London Knights	19	1173	16	3	44	1	0.928	2.25
Matěj Machovský	Brampton Battalion	8	526	4	4	20	1	0.900	2.28
Mathias Niederberger	Barrie Colts	13	794	7	6	31	1	0.933	2.34
Scott Wedgewood	Plymouth Whalers	13	781	7	6	31	2	0.928	2.38

== All-Star teams ==
The OHL All-Star Teams were selected by the OHL's General Managers.

=== First team ===
- Michael Sgarbossa, Centre, Sudbury Wolves
- Brandon Saad, Left Wing, Saginaw Spirit
- Tyler Toffoli, Right Wing, Ottawa 67's
- Dougie Hamilton, Defence, Niagara IceDogs
- Scott Harrington, Defence, London Knights
- Michael Houser, Goaltender, London Knights
- Greg Gilbert, Coach, Saginaw Spirit

=== Second team ===
- Sean Monahan, Centre, Ottawa 67's
- Tanner Pearson, Left Wing, Barrie Colts
- Seth Griffith, Right Wing, London Knights
- Cody Ceci, Defence, Ottawa 67's
- Ryan Murphy, Defence, Kitchener Rangers
- Mark Visentin, Goaltender, Niagara IceDogs
- Steve Spott, Coach, Kitchener Rangers

=== Third team ===
- Alex Friesen, Centre, Niagara IceDogs
- Andrew Agozzino, Left Wing, Niagara IceDogs
- Nail Yakupov, Right Wing, Sarnia Sting
- Beau Schmitz, Defence, Plymouth Whalers
- Ryan Sproul, Defence, Sault Ste. Marie Greyhounds
- John Gibson, Goaltender, Kitchener Rangers
- Stan Butler, Coach, Brampton Battalion

== Awards ==
J. Ross Robertson Cup:	London Knights
Hamilton Spectator Trophy:	London Knights
Bobby Orr Trophy:	Niagara IceDogs
Wayne Gretzky Trophy:	London Knights
Emms Trophy:	Niagara IceDogs
Leyden Trophy:	Ottawa 67's
Holody Trophy:	London Knights
Bumbacco Trophy:	Plymouth Whalers
Red Tilson Trophy:	Michael Houser, London Knights
Eddie Powers Memorial Trophy:	Michael Sgarbossa, Sudbury Wolves
Matt Leyden Trophy:	Greg Gilbert, Saginaw Spirit
Jim Mahon Memorial Trophy:	Tyler Toffoli, Ottawa 67's
Max Kaminsky Trophy:	Dougie Hamilton, Niagara IceDogs
OHL Goaltender of the Year:	Michael Houser, London Knights
Jack Ferguson Award:	Connor McDavid, Erie Otters
Dave Pinkney Trophy:	Mark Visentin & Christopher Festarini, Niagara IceDogs
OHL Executive of the Year:	Steve Bienkowski, Kitchener Rangers
Emms Family Award:	Aaron Ekblad, Barrie Colts
F. W. "Dinty" Moore Trophy:	Daniel Altshuller, Oshawa Generals
Dan Snyder Memorial Trophy:	Andrew D'Agostini, Peterborough Petes
William Hanley Trophy:	Brandon Saad, Saginaw Spirit
Leo Lalonde Memorial Trophy:	Andrew Agozzino, Niagara IceDogs
Bobby Smith Trophy:	Adam Pelech, Erie Otters
Roger Neilson Memorial Award:	Kyle Pereira, Guelph Storm
Ivan Tennant Memorial Award:	Adam Pelech, Erie Otters
Mickey Renaud Captain's Trophy:	Andrew Agozzino, Niagara IceDogs
Tim Adams Memorial Trophy:	Connor McDavid, Toronto Marlboros
Wayne Gretzky 99 Award:	Austin Watson, London Knights

== 2012 OHL Priority Selection ==
On April 7, 2012, the OHL conducted the 2012 Ontario Hockey League Priority Selection. The Erie Otters held the first overall pick in the draft, and selected Connor McDavid from the Toronto Marlboros. McDavid was awarded the Jack Ferguson Award, awarded to the top pick in the draft.

Below are the players who were selected in the first round of the 2012 Ontario Hockey League Priority Selection.

#	Player	Nationality	OHL team	Hometown	Minor team
1	Connor McDavid (C)	Canada	Erie Otters	Newmarket, Ontario	Toronto Marlboros
2	Roland McKeown (D)	Canada	Kingston Frontenacs	Listowel, Ontario	Toronto Marlboros
3	Eric Cornel (RW)	Canada	Peterborough Petes	Kemptville, Ontario	Upper Canada Cyclones
4	Jared McCann (C)	Canada	Sault Ste. Marie Greyhounds	Palmerston, Ontario	London Jr. Knights
5	Josh Ho-Sang (RW)	Canada	Windsor Spitfires	Thornhill, Ontario	Toronto Marlboros
6	Robby Fabbri (LW)	Canada	Guelph Storm	Mississauga, Ontario	Mississauga Rebels
7	Michael Dal Colle (C/LW)	Canada	Oshawa Generals	Woodbridge, Ontario	Vaughan Kings
8	Jacob Middleton (D)	Canada	Owen Sound Attack	Stratford, Ontario	Huron Perth Lakers
9	Sam Bennett (LW)	Canada	Kingston Frontenacs	Holland Landing, Ontario	Toronto Marlboros
10	Niki Petti (C)	Canada	Belleville Bulls	Welland, Ontario	Southern Tier Admirals
11	Damian Bourne (LW)	Canada	Mississauga St. Michael's Majors	Oakville, Ontario	Mississauga Rebels
12	Jeremiah Addison (LW)	Canada	Saginaw Spirit	Brampton, Ontario	Toronto Marlboros
13	Brett Hargrave (RW)	Canada	Sarnia Sting	North Bay, Ontario	Mississauga Rebels
14	Conor Cummins (D)	Canada	Sudbury Wolves	Whitby, Ontario	Whitby Wildcats
15	Blake Clarke (LW)	/ (United States) Canada/USA	Brampton Battalion	Wildwood, Missouri	St. Louis Blues 18U
16	Brendan Perlini (LW)	Canada	Barrie Colts	Sault Ste. Marie, Ontario	Detroit Belle Tire 16U
17	Matt Schmalz (RW)	Canada	Kitchener Rangers	Dunnville, Ontario	Southern Tier Admirals
18	Dante Salituro (C)	Canada	Ottawa 67's	Toronto, Ontario	Don Mills Flyers
19	Zach Bratina (LW)	Canada	Plymouth Whalers	Lindsay, Ontario	Central Ontario Wolves
20	Aaron Haydon (D)	United States	Niagara IceDogs	Plymouth, Michigan	Detroit Belle Tire 16U
21	Brook Hiddink (RW)	Canada	Niagara IceDogs	St. Thomas, Ontario	Elgin-Middlesex Chiefs
22	Liam Herbst (G)	Canada	London Knights	Toronto, Ontario	Mississauga Rebels

== 2012 NHL entry draft ==
On June 22-23, 2012, the National Hockey League conducted the 2012 NHL entry draft held at the Consol Energy Center in Pittsburgh, Pennsylvania. In total, 48 players from the Ontario Hockey League were selected in the draft. Nail Yakupov of the Sarnia Sting was the first player from the OHL to be selected, as he was taken with the first overall pick by the Edmonton Oilers.

Below are the players selected from OHL teams at the NHL Entry Draft.

Round	#	Player	Nationality	NHL team	Hometown	OHL team
1	1	Nail Yakupov (RW)	Russia	Edmonton Oilers	Nizhnekamsk, Russia	Sarnia Sting
1	3	Alex Galchenyuk (C)	United States	Montreal Canadiens	Milwaukee, Wisconsin	Sarnia Sting
1	10	Slater Koekkoek (D)	Canada	Tampa Bay Lightning	Mountain, Ontario	Peterborough Petes
1	13	Radek Faksa (C)	Czech Republic	Dallas Stars	Opava, Czech Republic	Kitchener Rangers
1	15	Cody Ceci (D)	Canada	Ottawa Senators	Ottawa, Ontario	Ottawa 67's
1	16	Tom Wilson (RW)	Canada	Washington Capitals	Toronto, Ontario	Plymouth Whalers
1	20	Scott Laughton (C)	Canada	Philadelphia Flyers	Oakville, Ontario	Oshawa Generals
1	22	Olli Maatta (D)	Finland	Pittsburgh Penguins	Jyväskylä, Finland	London Knights
1	24	Malcolm Subban (G)	Canada	Boston Bruins	Toronto, Ontario	Belleville Bulls
1	26	Brendan Gaunce (C)	Canada	Vancouver Canucks	Markham, Ontario	Belleville Bulls
1	30	Tanner Pearson (LW)	Canada	Los Angeles Kings	Kitchener, Ontario	Barrie Colts
2	35	Matthew Finn (D)	Canada	Toronto Maple Leafs	Toronto, Ontario	Guelph Storm
2	40	Dylan Blujus (D)	United States	Tampa Bay Lightning	Amherst, New York	Brampton Battalion
2	41	Mitchell Heard (C)	Canada	Colorado Avalanche	Bowmanville, Ontario	Plymouth Whalers
2	47	Brock McGinn (LW)	Canada	Carolina Hurricanes	Fergus, Ontario	Guelph Storm
2	55	Chris Tierney (C)	Canada	San Jose Sharks	Keswick, Ontario	London Knights
3	65	Adam Pelech (D)	Canada	New York Islanders	Toronto, Ontario	Erie Otters
3	69	Daniel Altshuller (G)	Canada	Carolina Hurricanes	Nepean, Ontario	Oshawa Generals
3	70	Scott Kosmachuk (RW)	Canada	Winnipeg Jets	Toronto, Ontario	Guelph Storm
3	71	Tanner Richard (LW)	Switzerland	Tampa Bay Lightning	Rapperswil-Jona, Switzerland	Guelph Storm
3	73	Justin Kea (C)	Canada	Buffalo Sabres	Woodville, Ontario	Saginaw Spirit
3	80	Jake Paterson (G)	Canada	Detroit Red Wings	Mississauga, Ontario	Saginaw Spirit
3	82	Jarrod Maidens (RW)	Canada	Ottawa Senators	Newmarket, Ontario	Owen Sound Attack
3	83	Matt Murray (G)	Canada	Pittsburgh Penguins	Thunder Bay, Ontario	Sault Ste. Marie Greyhounds
3	90	Ben Johnson (LW)	United States	New Jersey Devils	Calumet, Michigan	Windsor Spitfires
3	91	Daniil Zharkov (LW)	Russia	Edmonton Oilers	Saint Petersburg, Russia	Belleville Bulls
4	92	Matia Marcantuoni (C)	Canada	Pittsburgh Penguins	Toronto, Ontario	Kitchener Rangers
4	94	Brady Vail (C)	United States	Montreal Canadiens	Palm City, Florida	Windsor Spitfires
4	95	Josh Anderson (RW)	Canada	Columbus Blue Jackets	Burlington, Ontario	London Knights
4	96	Ben Thomson (LW)	Canada	New Jersey Devils	Orangeville, Ontario	Kitchener Rangers
4	104	Gemel Smith (C)	Canada	Dallas Stars	Thornhill, Ontario	Owen Sound Attack
4	110	Andreas Athanasiou (LW)	Canada	Detroit Red Wings	Woodbridge, Ontario	London Knights
4	115	Trevor Carrick (D)	Canada	Carolina Hurricanes	Stouffville, Ontario	Mississauga St. Michael's Majors
5	131	Seth Griffith (RW)	Canada	Boston Bruins	Wallaceburg, Ontario	London Knights
5	132	Michael Clarke (C)	Canada	Colorado Avalanche	London, Ontario	Windsor Spitfires
5	139	Garret Ross (LW)	United States	Chicago Blackhawks	Dearborn Heights, Michigan	Saginaw Spirit
5	143	Clark Seymour (D)	Canada	Pittsburgh Penguins	Brockville, Ontario	Peterborough Petes
5	145	Cody Payne (RW)	United States	Boston Bruins	Weston, Florida	Plymouth Whalers
5	151	Colin Miller (D)	Canada	Los Angeles Kings	Sault Ste. Marie, Ontario	Sault Ste. Marie Greyhounds
6	155	Jesse Graham (D)	Canada	New York Islanders	Toronto, Ontario	Niagara IceDogs
6	156	Connor Brown (RW)	Canada	Toronto Maple Leafs	Toronto, Ontario	Erie Otters
6	157	Ryan Rupert (C)	Canada	Toronto Maple Leafs	Grand Bend, Ontario	London Knights
6	161	Jake Dotchin (D)	Canada	Tampa Bay Lightning	Cambridge, Ontario	Owen Sound Attack
6	162	Joseph Blandisi (C)	Canada	Colorado Avalanche	Markham, Ontario	Owen Sound Attack
6	180	Artur Gavrus (C)	Belarus	New Jersey Devils	Ratichi, Belarus	Owen Sound Attack
7	182	Gianluca Curcuruto (D)	Canada	Columbus Blue Jackets	Richmond Hill, Ontario	Sault Ste. Marie Greyhounds
7	193	Brady Austin (D)	Canada	Buffalo Sabres	Bobcaygeon, Ontario	Belleville Bulls
7	211	Nick Ebert (D)	United States	Los Angeles Kings	Livingston, New Jersey	Windsor Spitfires

== 2012 CHL Import Draft ==
On June 27, 2012, the Canadian Hockey League conducted the 2012 CHL Import Draft, in which teams in all three CHL leagues participate in. The Erie Otters held the first pick in the draft by a team in the OHL, and selected Oscar Dansk from Sweden with their selection.

Below are the players who were selected in the first round by Ontario Hockey League teams in the 2012 CHL Import Draft.

#	Player	Nationality	OHL team	Hometown	Last Team
3	Oscar Dansk (G)	Sweden	Erie Otters	Tumba, Sweden	Brynas IF Jr.
6	Mikko Vainonen (D)	Finland	Kingston Frontenacs	Helsinki, Finland	HIFK
9	Nikita Zadorov (D)	Russia	London Knights	Moscow, Russia	Krasnaya Armiya
12	Sergey Tolchinsky (RW)	Russia	Sault Ste. Marie Greyhounds	Moscow, Russia	Krasnaya Armiya
15	Vladimir Ionin (RW)	Russia	Windsor Spitfires	Chelyabinsk, Russia	Omskie Yastreby
18	Nikita Serebryakov (G)	Russia	Saginaw Spirit	Moscow, Russia	Dynamo Moscow U17
21	Ludvig Bystrom (D)	Sweden	Plymouth Whalers	Örnsköldsvik, Sweden	Modo Hockey Jr.
24	Gilbert Gabor (LW)	Slovakia	Owen Sound Attack	Stockholm, Sweden	AIK IF Jr. 18
27	Dominik Kubalik (LW)	Czech Republic	Sudbury Wolves	Plzeň, Czech Republic	HC Plzen
30	Semyon Babintsev (RW)	Russia	Mississauga Steelheads	Moscow, Russia	Oakland Jr. Grizzlies 18U
33	Andrey Alexeev (C)	Russia	Saginaw Spirit	Moscow, Russia	HC MVD
36	Nikolay Goldobin (LW)	Russia	Sarnia Sting	Moscow, Russia	Chekhov Russkiye Vityazi
39	Dominik Kahun (LW)	Germany	Sudbury Wolves	Mantel, Germany	Heilbronner Falken Jr.
42	Jonatan Tanus (C)	Finland	Peterborough Petes	Tampere, Finland	Tappara U20
45	Samu Markkula (LW)	Finland	Barrie Colts	Jyväskylä, Finland	JYP Jr.
48	Teddy Blueger (C)	Latvia	Oshawa Generals	Riga, Latvia	Shattuck-Saint Mary's
51	Ladislav Zikmund (LW)	Czech Republic	Ottawa 67's	Sokolov, Czech Republic	HC Karlovy Vary Jr. B
54	Richard Mraz (RW)	Slovakia	Ottawa 67's	Nové Zámky, Slovakia	Tatranskie Volki
56	Ondrej Kopta (LW)	Czech Republic	Niagara IceDogs	Plzeň, Czech Republic	Texas Tornado
58	Nikolai Prokhorkin (LW)	Russia	London Knights	Chelyabinsk, Russia	CSKA Moscow

== See also ==
- 2012 Memorial Cup
- List of OHL seasons
- 2011–12 QMJHL season
- 2011–12 WHL season
- 2011 NHL entry draft
- List of OHA Junior A standings
- 2011 in ice hockey
- 2012 in ice hockey

Preceded by 2010–11 OHL season	OHL seasons	Succeeded by 2012–13 OHL season
