= Kopta =

Kopta (Czech feminine: Koptová) is a surname. Notable people with the surname include:

- Josef Kopta (1894–1962), Czech writer
- Ondřej Kopta (born 1995), Czech ice hockey player
- Václav Kopta (born 1965), Czech actor and musician
