= Julian Melchiori =

Canadian ice hockey player (born 1991)

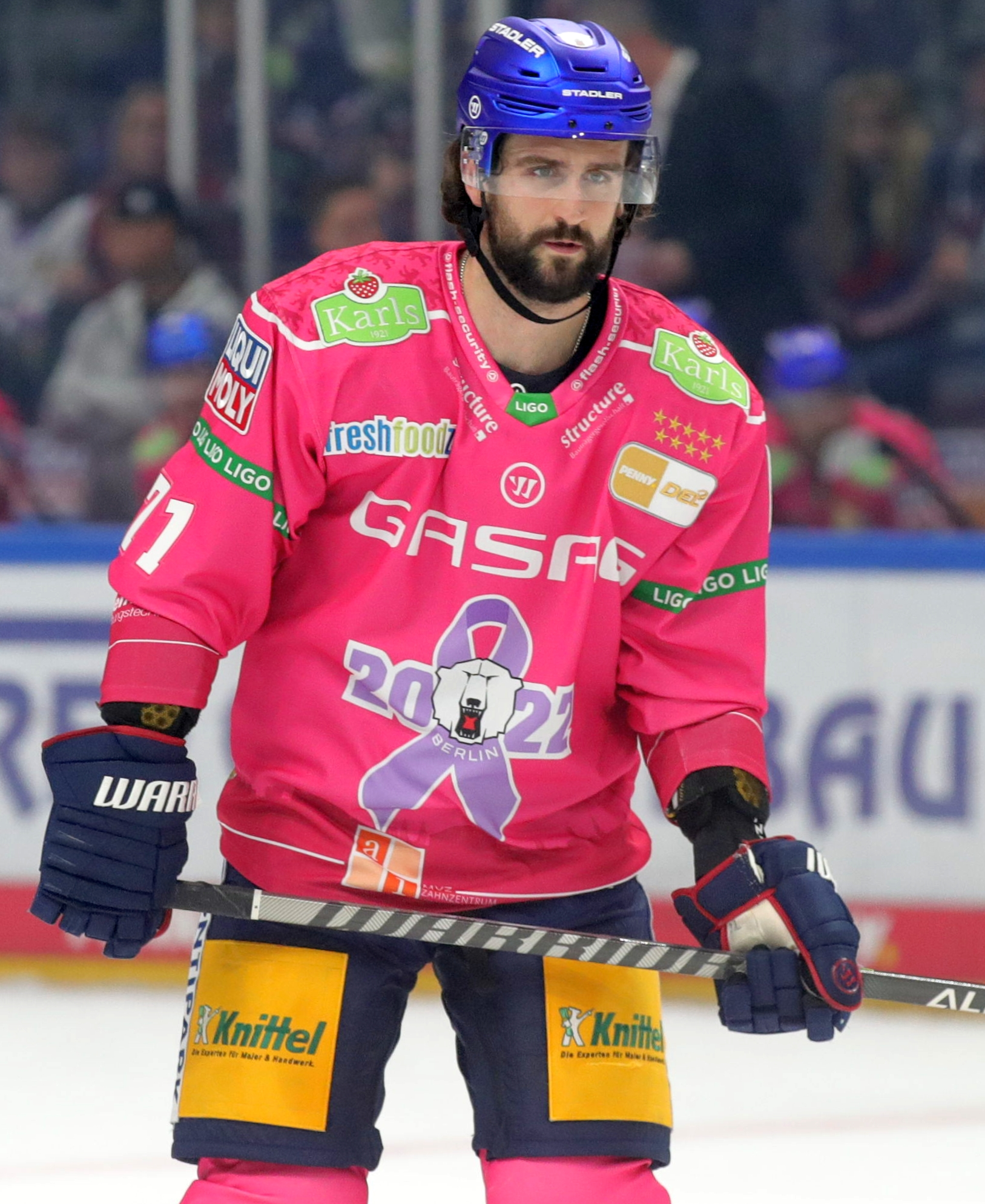
- Melchiori with the Eisbären Berlin in 2022
- Born: December 6, 1991 (age 34) Richmond Hill, Ontario, Canada
- Height: 6 ft 4 in (193 cm)
- Weight: 217 lb (98 kg; 15 st 7 lb)
- Position: Defence
- Shoots: Left
- DEL team Former teams: Grizzlys Wolfsburg; Winnipeg Jets; Eisbären Berlin
- NHL draft: 87th Overall, 2010; Atlanta Thrashers
- Playing career: 2012–present

Julian Melchiori (born December 6, 1991) is a Canadian professional ice hockey defenceman who is currently playing with Grizzlys Wolfsburg in the Deutsche Eishockey Liga (DEL). He was selected in the third round, 87th overall, in the 2010 NHL entry draft by the Atlanta Thrashers.

== Playing career ==
On March 16, 2012, Melchiori, a Thrashers draft pick, signed a three-year entry-level contract with the relocated Winnipeg Jets. Melchiori made his NHL debut on December 27, 2013, playing 8:41 of ice time with the Winnipeg Jets in a 6–4 home game win over the Minnesota Wild. On July 2, 2016, he re-signed with the Jets on a two-year, two-way contract.

Having played the first 6 years of his professional career within the Jets organization, Melchiori left as a free agent following the 2017–18 campaign, in which he spent exclusively with the Jets' affiliate, the Manitoba Moose of the AHL. On July 13, 2018, Melchiori agreed to a one-year, two-way contract with the Florida Panthers.

As a free agent, Melchiori left the Panthers after one season and signed a one-year contract to continue his career in the AHL with the Binghamton Devils, affiliate to the New Jersey Devils on July 23, 2019. In the 2019–20 season, Melchiori collected 13 points through 54 games on the blueline for Binghamton before he was signed to a one-year, two-way contract with the New Jersey Devils for the remainder of the season on February 23, 2020.

With the season ending prematurely due to the COVID-19 pandemic, Melchiori left the Devils as a free agent, embarking on a career abroad by agreeing to a one-year contract with Russian club HC Neftekhimik Nizhnekamsk of the Kontinental Hockey League on July 18, 2020. Melchiori was later released from his contract with Neftekhimik without appearing for the club, opting to move to Germany, signing a one-year contract with Grizzlys Wolfsburg of the DEL on November 10, 2020.

After two seasons in Wolfsburg, Melchiori left the club and continued his career in Germany, signing a two-year contract with Eisbären Berlin on May 19, 2022.

== Personal life ==
Melchiori is the nephew of NHL hockey player Mike Murphy.

== Career statistics ==
			Regular season					Playoffs
Season	Team	League	GP	G	A	Pts	PIM	GP	G	A	Pts	PIM
2008–09	Newmarket Hurricanes	OJHL	48	2	20	22	34	9	1	2	3	14
2009–10	Newmarket Hurricanes	OJHL	39	7	16	23	16	20	2	9	11	10
2010–11	Kitchener Rangers	OHL	63	1	18	19	55	3	0	0	0	0
2011–12	Kitchener Rangers	OHL	35	2	17	19	42	—	—	—	—	—
2011–12	Oshawa Generals	OHL	26	0	17	17	22	6	2	1	3	2
2011–12	St. John's IceCaps	AHL	1	0	0	0	0	—	—	—	—	—
2012–13	St. John's IceCaps	AHL	52	1	7	8	39	—	—	—	—	—
2013–14	St. John's IceCaps	AHL	50	1	10	11	32	—	—	—	—	—
2013–14	Winnipeg Jets	NHL	1	0	0	0	0	—	—	—	—	—
2014–15	St. John's IceCaps	AHL	70	1	5	6	54	—	—	—	—	—
2015–16	Manitoba Moose	AHL	62	3	4	7	46	—	—	—	—	—
2015–16	Winnipeg Jets	NHL	11	0	0	0	0	—	—	—	—	—
2016–17	Manitoba Moose	AHL	40	2	6	8	18	—	—	—	—	—
2016–17	Winnipeg Jets	NHL	18	0	2	2	8	—	—	—	—	—
2017–18	Manitoba Moose	AHL	49	4	10	14	15	7	2	4	6	0
2018–19	Springfield Thunderbirds	AHL	54	6	6	12	49	—	—	—	—	—
2019–20	Binghamton Devils	AHL	61	6	11	17	14	—	—	—	—	—
2020–21	Grizzlys Wolfsburg	DEL	38	1	6	7	18	9	1	2	3	8
2021–22	Grizzlys Wolfsburg	DEL	55	8	16	24	22	8	1	1	2	0
2022–23	Eisbären Berlin	DEL	55	4	12	16	29	—	—	—	—	—
2023–24	Eisbären Berlin	DEL	52	4	13	17	18	15	1	3	4	6
2024–25	Grizzlys Wolfsburg	DEL	49	8	9	17	45	—	—	—	—	—
NHL totals			30	0	2	2	8	—	—	—	—	—

== Awards and honours ==
Award	Year
DEL
Champions (Eisbären Berlin)	2024
