= Alex Friesen =

Canadian ice hockey player

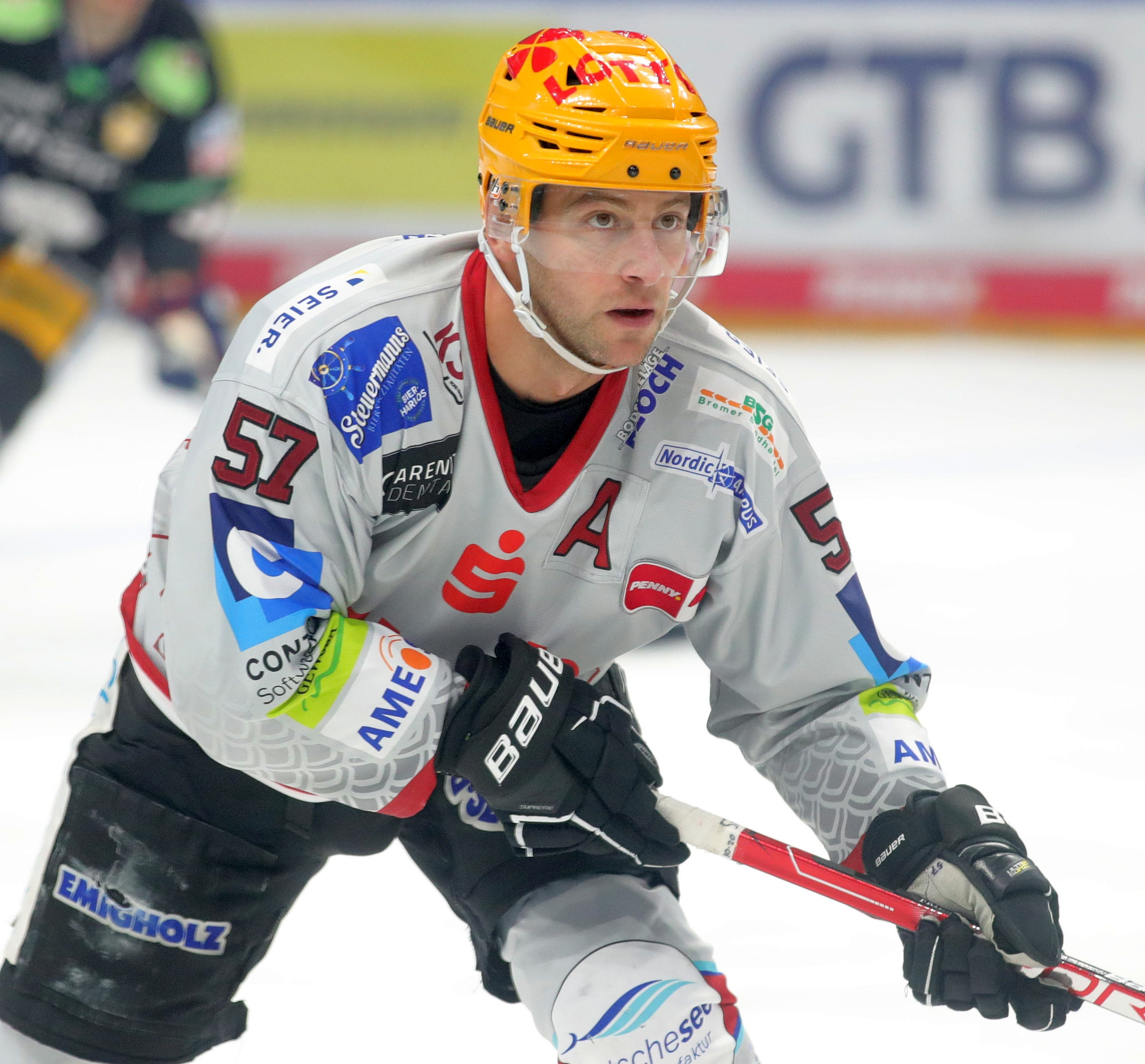
- Alex Friesen playing for Fischtown Pinguins in 2022
- Born: January 30, 1991 (age 35) St. Catharines, Ontario, Canada
- Height: 5 ft 10 in (178 cm)
- Weight: 186 lb (84 kg; 13 st 4 lb)
- Position: Centre
- Shoots: Left
- DEL team Former teams: Fischtown Pinguins; Vancouver Canucks; Leksands IF
- NHL draft: 172nd overall, 2010; Vancouver Canucks
- Playing career: 2013–present

Alex Friesen (born January 30, 1991) is a Canadian professional ice hockey forward currently playing for the Fischtown Pinguins in the Deutsche Eishockey Liga (DEL). He was selected by the Vancouver Canucks in the 6th round (172nd overall) in the 2010 NHL entry draft, and played one game in the NHL with the team in 2016.

== Playing career ==
Friesen played his junior ice hockey career with the Niagara Ice Dogs of the Ontario Hockey League. He scored his first pro goal on February 1, 2013, against the Milwaukee Admirals while playing with the Chicago Wolves. He was a member of the Utica Comets team that made it to the Calder Cup Finals in 2015, they lost to the Manchester Monarchs in 5 games.

On June 22, 2015, Friesen signed a two-year contract extension worth $575,000. During the 2015–16 season, Friesen made his NHL debut on February 15, 2016, with the Canucks in a 5–2 loss to the Minnesota Wild.

On July 2, 2016, having left the Canucks as a free agent, Friesen agreed to a one-year, two-way contract with the St. Louis Blues. In his return to the Chicago Wolves in the 2016–17 season, Friesen's offensive production dropped in registering just 3 goals and 12 points in 76 games.

As an impending free agent, Friesen opted to pursue a European career, agreeing to an initial one-year deal with Leksands IF of the HockeyAllsvenskan on June 6, 2017. In his debut season in Sweden in 2017–18, Friesen adapted his offensive game in scoring 44 points in 52 games with Leksands.

At the conclusion of his contract, Friesen left as a free agent and agreed to a two-year contract with German outfit, Fischtown Pinguins of the DEL, on June 29, 2018.

== Career statistics ==
			Regular season					Playoffs
Season	Team	League	GP	G	A	Pts	PIM	GP	G	A	Pts	PIM
2007–08	Niagara Ice Dogs	OHL	46	5	9	14	26	10	0	2	2	6
2008–09	Niagara Ice Dogs	OHL	64	11	22	33	94	12	3	7	10	25
2009–10	Niagara Ice Dogs	OHL	60	23	37	60	94	14	2	8	10	19
2010–11	Niagara Ice Dogs	OHL	60	26	40	66	61	14	2	8	10	19
2011–12	Niagara Ice Dogs	OHL	62	26	45	71	106	20	8	14	22	18
2012–13	Chicago Wolves	AHL	42	1	4	5	22	—	—	—	—	—
2012–13	Kalamazoo Wings	ECHL	10	0	4	4	2	—	—	—	—	—
2013–14	Utica Comets	AHL	54	6	14	20	32	—	—	—	—	—
2014–15	Utica Comets	AHL	60	10	20	30	57	23	4	6	10	12
2015–16	Utica Comets	AHL	65	14	17	31	75	4	1	1	2	2
2015–16	Vancouver Canucks	NHL	1	0	0	0	0	—	—	—	—	—
2016–17	Chicago Wolves	AHL	76	3	9	12	47	10	1	3	4	8
2017–18	Leksands IF	Allsv	52	15	29	44	36	11	1	2	3	35
2018–19	Fischtown Pinguins	DEL	50	10	20	30	105	3	1	2	3	2
2019–20	Fischtown Pinguins	DEL	50	7	25	32	38	—	—	—	—	—
2020–21	Fischtown Pinguins	DEL	28	7	17	24	20	3	0	1	1	0
2021–22	Fischtown Pinguins	DEL	46	7	17	24	66	5	2	1	3	2
2022–23	Fischtown Pinguins	DEL	56	17	21	38	28	8	1	1	2	8
2023–24	Fischtown Pinguins	DEL	52	8	22	30	85	14	3	3	6	15
2024–25	Fischtown Pinguins	DEL	38	6	9	15	12	—	—	—	—	—
AHL totals			297	34	64	98	233	37	6	10	16	22
NHL totals			1	0	0	0	0	—	—	—	—	—
