= Jamie Devane =

Canadian professional ice hockey player

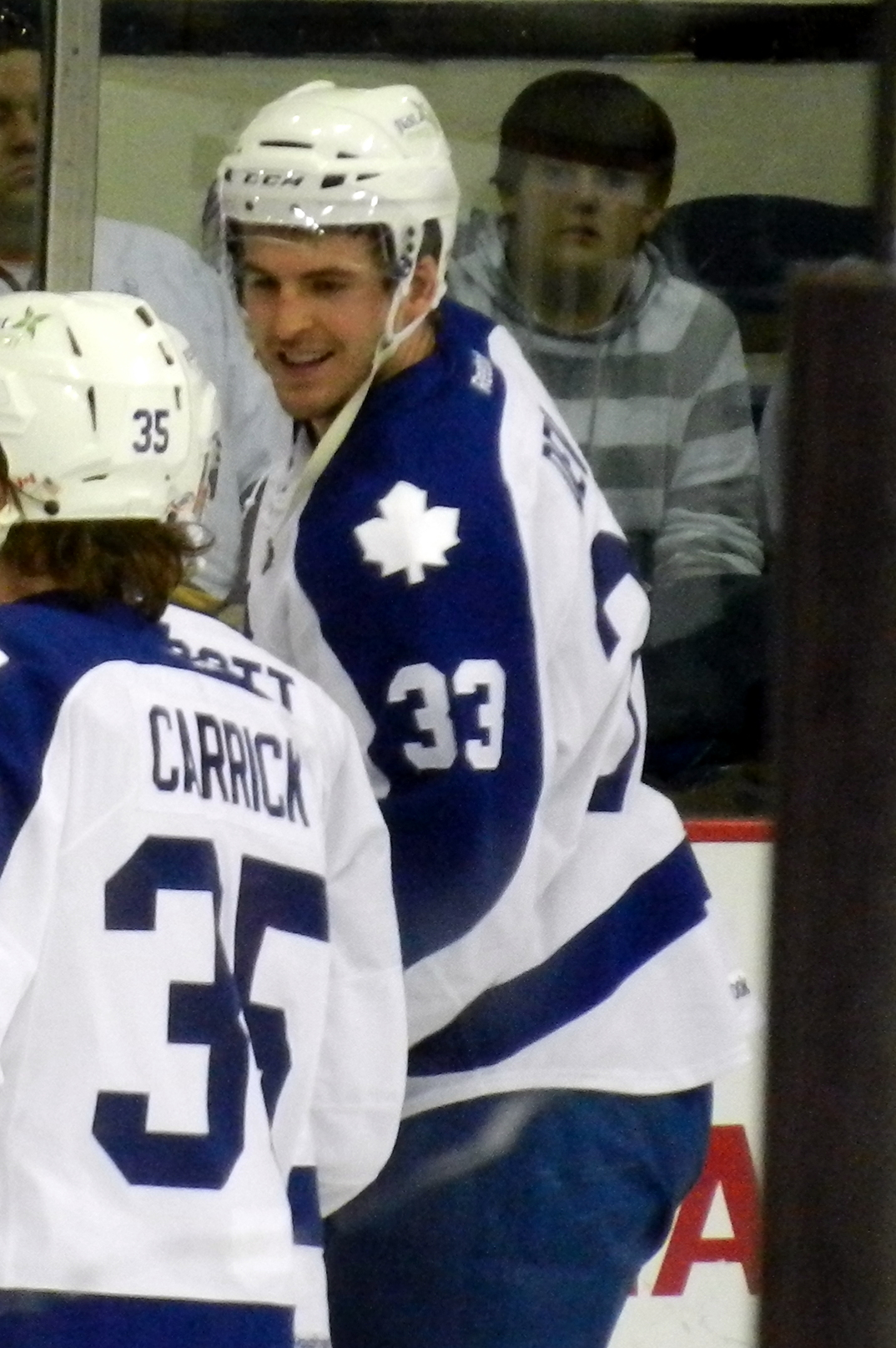
- Devane with the Toronto Marlies in 2013
- Born: February 20, 1991 (age 35) Mississauga, Ontario, Canada
- Height: 6 ft 5 in (196 cm)
- Weight: 232 lb (105 kg; 16 st 8 lb)
- Position: Left wing
- Shoots: Left
- team Former teams: Free agent Toronto Maple Leafs
- NHL draft: 68th overall, 2009; Toronto Maple Leafs
- Playing career: 2010–present

Jamie Devane (born February 20, 1991) is a Canadian professional ice hockey player who is currently an unrestricted free agent. He most recently played for the Wilkes-Barre/Scranton Penguins of the American Hockey League (AHL) while under contract. Devane was selected by the Toronto Maple Leafs in the third round (68th overall) of the 2009 NHL entry draft.

== Playing career ==
Devane played four seasons (2008–2012) of major junior hockey with the Plymouth Whalers of the Ontario Hockey League (OHL), scoring 53 goals and 61 assists for 114 points, while earning 411 penalty minutes, in 237 games played.

On July 12, 2015, Devane was traded by the Maple Leafs to the Nashville Predators in exchange for the rights to Taylor Beck. In the 2015–16 season, Devane was assigned to AHL affiliate, the Milwaukee Admirals, for the duration of the year. He contributed with 11 points in 62 games.

As a free agent from the Predators, Devane agreed to a professional try-out contract with the Calgary Flames on August 16, 2016. He was signed prior to camp on a one-year AHL contract with Flames affiliate, the Stockton Heat, announced on September 2, 2016. During the 2016–17 season, Devane was a relied upon physical presence for the Heat. In 43 games he added 4 goals and 13 points.

On August 18, 2017, Devane as a free agent opted to continue in the AHL, agreeing to a one-year deal with the division rival, the Ontario Reign.

After two seasons with the Reign, Devane left the club as a free agent at the conclusion of the 2018–19 season. On August 7, 2019, Devane continued his career in the AHL, agreeing to a one-year contract with the Wilkes-Barre/Scranton Penguins, the primary affiliate of the Pittsburgh Penguins. In the COVID-19 shortened 2019–20 season, Devane made 36 regular season appearances with Wilkes-Barre, collecting 4 goals and 9 points.

As a free agent leading into the pandemic delayed 2020–21 season, Devane was signed to a professional tryout contract with the San Diego Gulls of the AHL on February 17, 2021. He remained with the Gulls for the duration of the season, collecting a solitary goal through 26 regular season games.

On June 10, 2021, Devane returned to previous club, the Wilkes-Barre/Scranton Penguins, agreeing to a one-year deal for the 2021–22 season.

== Career statistics ==
			Regular season					Playoffs
Season	Team	League	GP	G	A	Pts	PIM	GP	G	A	Pts	PIM
2007–08	Vaughan Vipers	OPJHL	19	2	0	2	17	—	—	—	—	—
2008–09	Plymouth Whalers	OHL	64	5	12	17	92	11	0	0	0	17
2009–10	Plymouth Whalers	OHL	51	6	8	14	84	9	0	1	1	12
2009–10	Toronto Marlies	AHL	2	0	0	0	4	—	—	—	—	—
2010–11	Plymouth Whalers	OHL	63	19	19	38	131	10	2	3	5	19
2011–12	Plymouth Whalers	OHL	59	23	22	45	104	13	2	1	3	19
2012–13	Toronto Marlies	AHL	22	2	3	5	41	—	—	—	—	—
2012–13	San Francisco Bulls	ECHL	12	1	0	1	45	—	—	—	—	—
2013–14	Toronto Marlies	AHL	55	4	4	8	146	2	0	0	0	2
2013–14	Toronto Maple Leafs	NHL	2	0	0	0	0	—	—	—	—	—
2014–15	Toronto Marlies	AHL	39	0	2	2	62	—	—	—	—	—
2015–16	Milwaukee Admirals	AHL	62	6	5	11	82	3	0	0	0	2
2016–17	Stockton Heat	AHL	43	4	9	13	77	5	1	1	2	4
2017–18	Ontario Reign	AHL	54	2	3	5	96	—	—	—	—	—
2018–19	Ontario Reign	AHL	27	2	1	3	79	—	—	—	—	—
2019–20	Wilkes-Barre/Scranton Penguins	AHL	36	4	5	9	81	—	—	—	—	—
2020–21	San Diego Gulls	AHL	26	1	0	1	44	3	0	0	0	0
2021–22	Wilkes-Barre/Scranton Penguins	AHL	27	3	1	4	35	4	0	0	0	7
2022–23	Wilkes-Barre/Scranton Penguins	AHL	28	0	4	4	43	—	—	—	—	—
NHL totals			2	0	0	0	0	—	—	—	—	—
