= Ben Thomson (ice hockey, born 1993) =

Canadian ice hockey player

- Born: January 16, 1993 (age 33) Orangeville, Ontario, Canada
- Height: 6 ft 4 in (193 cm)
- Weight: 220 lb (100 kg; 15 st 10 lb)
- Position: Forward
- Shoots: Left
- team Former teams: Free Agent; New Jersey Devils
- NHL draft: 96th overall, 2012; New Jersey Devils
- Playing career: 2014–present

Ben Thomson (born January 16, 1993) is a Canadian professional ice hockey forward who is currently an unrestricted free agent. He most recently played with the Henderson Silver Knights in the American Hockey League (AHL). He was drafted by the New Jersey Devils in the fourth round, 96th overall, of the 2012 NHL entry draft. Thomson played junior hockey with the Kitchener Rangers and North Bay Battalion of the Ontario Hockey League.

== Playing career ==
On May 23, 2014, Thomson was signed to a three-year, entry-level contract with the New Jersey Devils. He made his NHL debut against the Philadelphia Flyers on April 4, 2017, and played two more games at the NHL level before being reassigned to the AHL.

Thomson signed a one-year, two-way contract on July 26, 2017. After attending the Devils training camp, Thomson was re-assigned to inaugural AHL affiliate, the Binghamton Devils, for the duration of the 2017–18 season. He recorded 5 goals and 13 points in 64 games, leading the team and setting a new AHL career high in penalty minutes with 119.

As a free agent from the Devils and approaching the 2018–19 season, Thomson agreed to a one-year AHL contract with the San Diego Gulls, affiliate to the Anaheim Ducks on September 6, 2018. He played 53 games with the Gulls, recording 4 goals and 13 points with 91 penalty minutes.

Having left the San Diego Gulls after his contract, Thomson continued in the AHL for the 2019–20 season, agreeing to a one-year deal with the Bridgeport Sound Tigers, affiliate of the New York Islanders on October 5, 2019.

On December 14, 2020, Thomson continued his professional career in agreeing to a one-year ECHL contract with the Orlando Solar Bears. He featured in 10 games to begin the 2020–21 season, registering 2 assists, before returning to the Binghamton Devils organization on a professional tryout basis on February 1, 2021. After scoring in Binghamton's season opening game, Thomson was signed to a one-year AHL contract with the Devils on February 12, 2021. Thomson made 31 appearances with Binghamton in the shortened season posting 6 goals and 1 assist.

As a free agent, Thomson continued his career in the AHL, agreeing to a one-year contract with the Henderson Silver Knights, the primary affiliate of the Vegas Golden Knights, on August 16, 2021.

== Career statistics ==
=== Regular season and playoffs ===
			Regular season					Playoffs
Season	Team	League	GP	G	A	Pts	PIM	GP	G	A	Pts	PIM
2009–10	Kitchener Rangers	OHL	46	6	6	12	30	11	0	1	1	6
2010–11	Kitchener Rangers	OHL	68	6	13	19	107	7	0	1	1	0
2011–12	Kitchener Rangers	OHL	67	11	31	42	137	16	5	5	10	36
2012–13	Kitchener Rangers	OHL	67	15	17	32	119	10	1	2	3	18
2013–14	Kitchener Rangers	OHL	12	3	3	6	34	—	—	—	—	—
2013–14	North Bay Battalion	OHL	43	24	15	39	56	22	5	9	14	64
2014–15	Albany Devils	AHL	67	8	8	16	97	—	—	—	—	—
2015–16	Albany Devils	AHL	73	6	12	18	109	9	2	0	2	10
2016–17	Albany Devils	AHL	72	6	4	10	90	4	1	0	1	6
2016–17	New Jersey Devils	NHL	3	0	0	0	4	—	—	—	—	—
2017–18	Binghamton Devils	AHL	64	5	8	13	119	—	—	—	—	—
2018–19	San Diego Gulls	AHL	53	4	9	13	91	—	—	—	—	—
2019–20	Bridgeport Sound Tigers	AHL	5	0	1	1	7	—	—	—	—	—
2019–20	Worcester Railers	ECHL	23	5	10	15	23	—	—	—	—	—
2020–21	Orlando Solar Bears	ECHL	10	0	2	2	23	—	—	—	—	—
2020–21	Binghamton Devils	AHL	31	6	1	7	45	—	—	—	—	—
2021–22	Henderson Silver Knights	AHL	15	2	1	3	18	—	—	—	—	—
NHL totals			3	0	0	0	4	—	—	—	—	—

=== International ===
Year	Team	Event	Result	GP	G	A	Pts	PIM
2010	Canada Ontario	U17	2nd place, silver medalist(s)	6	1	1	2	2
Junior totals				6	1	1	2	2
