= Dalton Smith =

Canadian ice hockey player (born 1992)

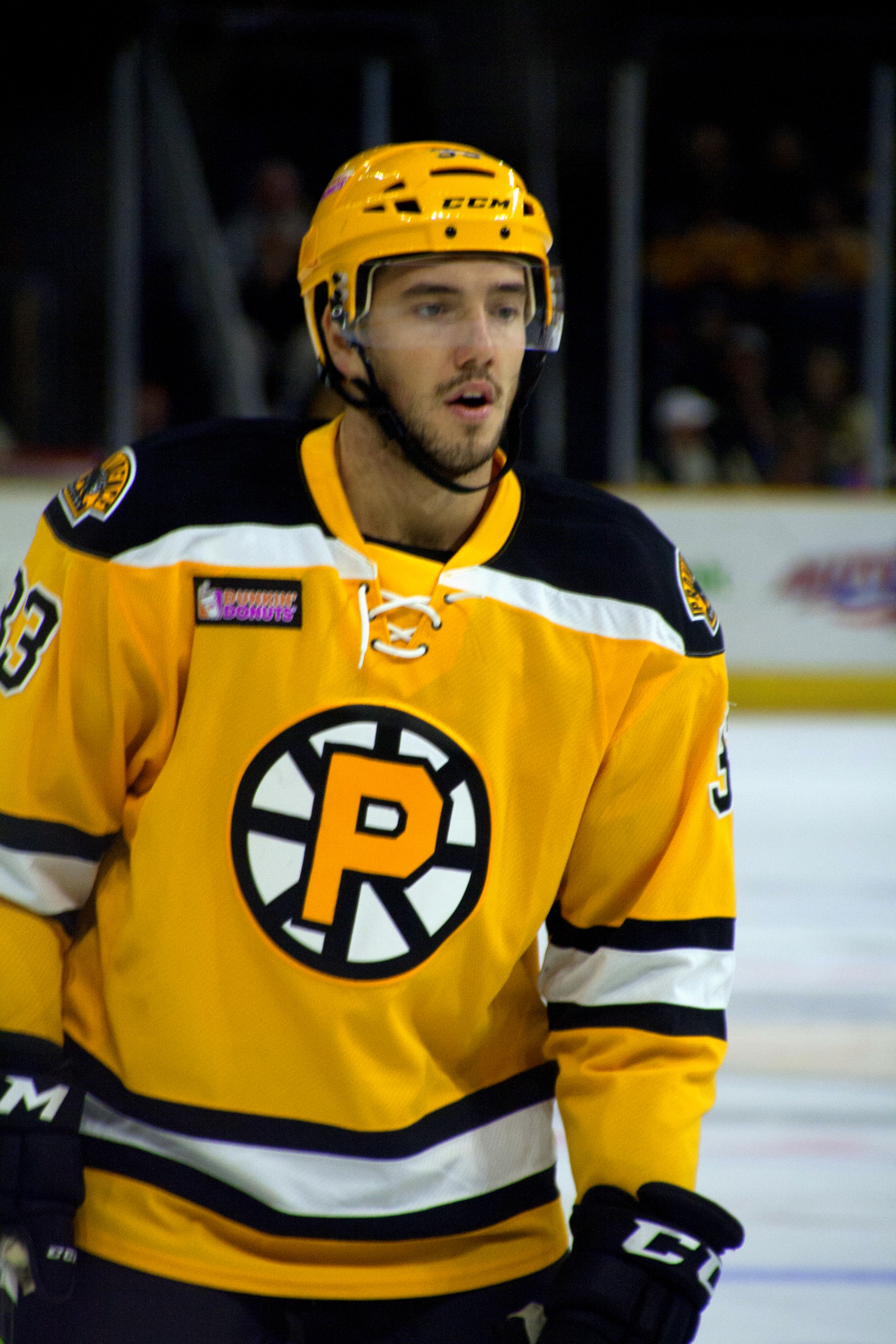
- Smith with the Providence Bruins in 2015
- Born: June 30, 1992 (age 34) Oshawa, Ontario, Canada
- Height: 6 ft 2 in (188 cm)
- Weight: 203 lb (92 kg; 14 st 7 lb)
- Position: Left wing
- Shoots: Left
- AHL team Former teams: Hershey Bears; Buffalo Sabres
- NHL draft: 34th overall, 2010; Columbus Blue Jackets
- Playing career: 2012–present

Dalton Smith (born June 30, 1992) is a Canadian professional ice hockey player who is currently playing with the Hershey Bears of the American Hockey League (AHL). Smith was selected by the Columbus Blue Jackets in the 2nd round (34th overall) of the 2010 NHL entry draft.

== Playing career ==
Smith played four seasons (2008–2012) of major junior hockey with the Ottawa 67's of the Ontario Hockey League (OHL), scoring 50 goals and 55 assists for 105 points, and earning 328 penalty minutes, over 196 games.

On August 8, 2011, the Columbus Blue Jackets signed Smith to a three-year entry-level contract.

At the 2013–14 trade deadline, the Blue Jackets traded Smith and Jonathan Marchessault, to the Tampa Bay Lightning in exchange for Dana Tyrell and Matt Taormina on 5 March 2014.

Smith spent the 2014–15 season with the Lightning's AHL affiliate, the Syracuse Crunch. When Smith's contract was not renewed, he accepted a try-out contract with the Providence Bruins of the AHL on October 3, 2015.

Failing to catch on in Providence, Smith was signed to a one-year contract with the Lehigh Valley Phantoms. He played 11 games with the Phantoms. After not being resigned by the Phantoms Smith attended the training camp of the Charlotte Checkers of the AHL. Smith belatedly signed a one-year contract with Charlotte near the start of the 2016–17 season, moving down one tier to their ECHL affiliate, the Florida Everblades, on 9 October 2016.

After playing out the season with the Everblades, recording a professional high 23 points in 60 games, Smith as a free agent the following summer attended the Rochester Americans 2017 training camp on September 25, 2017.

During the 2019–20 season, his 8th professional year, on December 30, 2019, Smith signed a one-year, two-way contract with the Americans' parent NHL club, the Buffalo Sabres. He was recalled to make his long-awaited NHL debut with the Sabres against the Tampa Bay Lightning on December 31, 2019, registering 2 penalty minutes in 1:26 of ice-time in a 6–4 defeat. He was placed on waivers to return to Rochester on 2 January 2020.

At the conclusion of his contract, Smith was not extended by the Sabres and as a free agent opted to remain within the organization, continuing his tenure in the AHL with the Americans on a one-year deal on October 12, 2020.

On July 29, 2021, Smith left Rochester after four seasons and signed to add a veteran presence on a one-year contract with the Colorado Eagles of the AHL. Smith enjoyed his most productive season in the AHL since 2015 during the 2021–22 season, collecting 5 goals and 11 points in 52 regular season games.

On June 28, 2022, Smith agreed to a two-year contract extension to remain with the Eagles.

Following three seasons within the Eagles organization, Smith left as a free agent and was belatedly signed to a one-year contract with reigning AHL champions, the Hershey Bears, on October 15, 2024.

== Personal life ==
Smith’s younger brother Blake also plays professional ice hockey.

== Career statistics ==
			Regular season					Playoffs
Season	Team	League	GP	G	A	Pts	PIM	GP	G	A	Pts	PIM
2008–09	Whitby Fury	OJHL	40	10	13	23	109	—	—	—	—	—
2008–09	Ottawa 67's	OHL	17	2	5	7	8	7	0	0	0	0
2009–10	Ottawa 67's	OHL	62	21	23	44	129	12	3	3	6	27
2010–11	Ottawa 67's	OHL	64	12	17	29	124	4	2	2	4	12
2011–12	Ottawa 67's	OHL	53	15	10	25	67	18	4	4	8	46
2012–13	Springfield Falcons	AHL	67	3	6	9	128	1	0	0	0	12
2013–14	Springfield Falcons	AHL	50	4	5	9	99	—	—	—	—	—
2013–14	Syracuse Crunch	AHL	19	2	1	3	51	—	—	—	—	—
2014–15	Syracuse Crunch	AHL	62	11	6	17	79	2	0	0	0	4
2015–16	Providence Bruins	AHL	17	1	0	1	24	—	—	—	—	—
2015–16	Lehigh Valley Phantoms	AHL	11	1	0	1	25	—	—	—	—	—
2016–17	Florida Everblades	ECHL	60	10	13	23	153	11	3	0	3	22
2017–18	Rochester Americans	AHL	45	1	1	2	102	—	—	—	—	—
2018–19	Rochester Americans	AHL	48	2	6	8	111	3	0	0	0	2
2019–20	Rochester Americans	AHL	42	1	4	5	63	—	—	—	—	—
2019–20	Buffalo Sabres	NHL	1	0	0	0	2	—	—	—	—	—
2020–21	Rochester Americans	AHL	22	1	0	1	45	—	—	—	—	—
2021–22	Colorado Eagles	AHL	52	5	6	11	59	5	0	0	0	11
2022–23	Colorado Eagles	AHL	6	0	0	0	32	—	—	—	—	—
2023–24	Colorado Eagles	AHL	49	1	4	5	99	—	—	—	—	—
2024–25	South Carolina Stingrays	ECHL	3	0	0	0	5	—	—	—	—	—
2024–25	Hershey Bears	AHL	30	2	5	7	51	1	0	0	0	0
2025–26	Hershey Bears	AHL	60	2	4	6	85	3	0	0	0	5
NHL totals			1	0	0	0	2	—	—	—	—	—
