= Garret Ross =

American ice hockey player (born 1992)

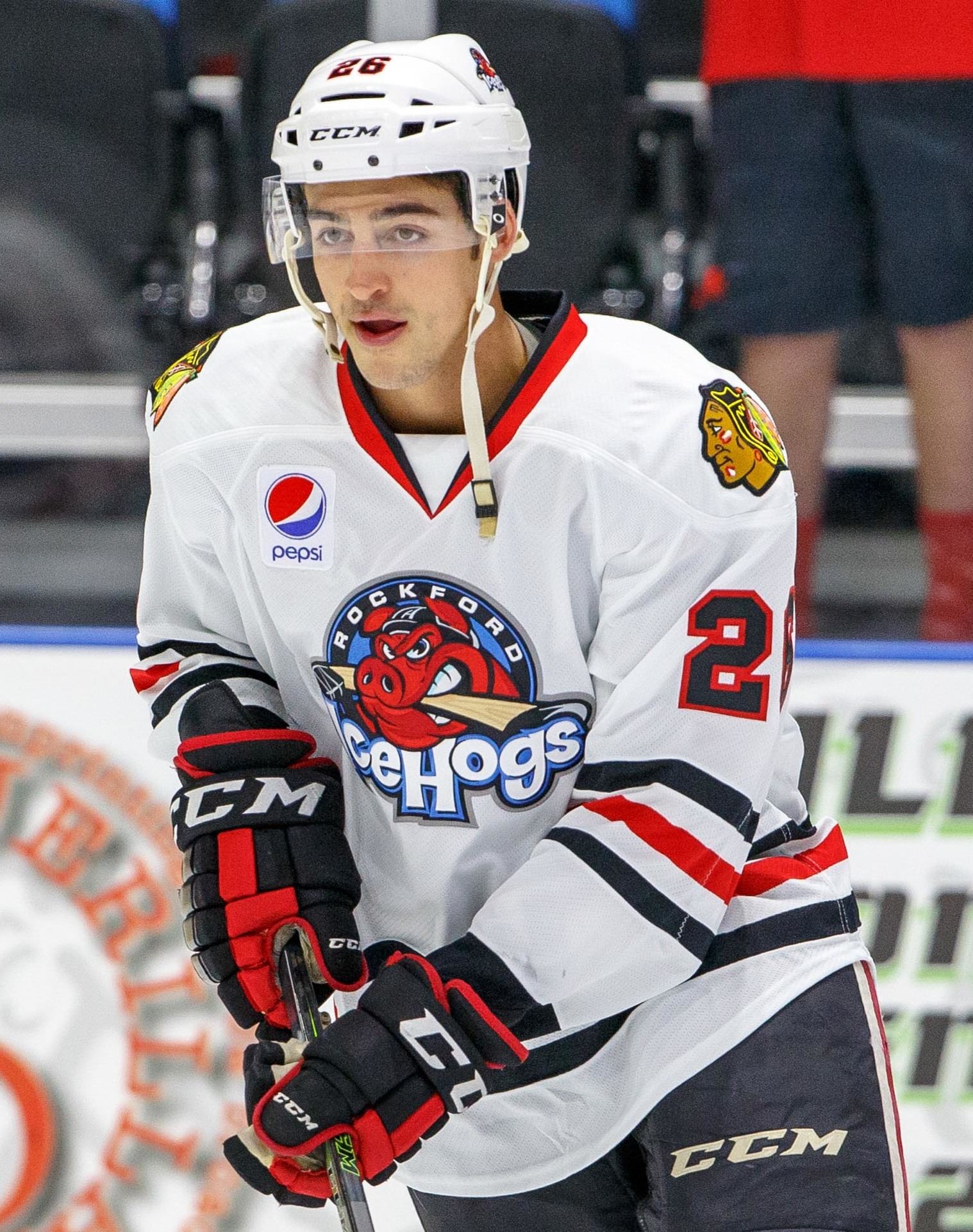
- Ross with the Rockford IceHogs in 2015
- Born: May 26, 1992 (age 34) Dearborn Heights, Michigan, U.S.
- Height: 6 ft 0 in (183 cm)
- Weight: 172 lb (78 kg; 12 st 4 lb)
- Position: Left wing
- Shot: Left
- Played for: Rockford IceHogs; Tucson Roadrunners; Rochester Americans; Milwaukee Admirals
- NHL draft: 139th overall, 2012; Chicago Blackhawks
- Playing career: 2013–2020

Garret Ross (born May 26, 1992) is an American former professional ice hockey player. He is currently coaching at Orchard Lake St. Mary’s. Ross was selected by the Chicago Blackhawks in the 5th round (139th overall) of the 2012 NHL entry draft.

== Playing career ==
=== Junior ===
Ross was drafted in the 2nd round, 17th overall, by the Cedar Rapids RoughRiders in the 2009 USHL Entry Draft, however he instead played four seasons ( 2009 – 2013) of major junior hockey with the Saginaw Spirit of the Ontario Hockey League (OHL), registering 82 goals and 88 assists for 170 points, while earning 421 penalty minutes, in 217 games played. Ross was recognized for his outstanding performance when he was named to the 2012-13 Second All-Star Team.

=== Professional ===
On April 9, 2013, the Chicago Blackhawks of the National Hockey League signed Ross to a three-year entry-level contract. He was assigned to AHL primary affiliate, the Rockford IceHogs for the duration of his contract with the Blackhawks.

On July 1, 2016, Ross signed as a free agent to a one-year, two-way contract with the Arizona Coyotes. In the 2016–17 season, Ross endured an unsuccessful tenure with the Coyotes AHL affiliate, the Tucson Roadrunners, in collecting just 1 goal in 27 games.

As a free agent from the Coyotes, Ross signed a one-year AHL contract with the Rochester Americans on September 15, 2017.

After six seasons in the AHL, Ross as a free agent continued his professional career in agreeing to a one-year contract with the Fort Wayne Komets of the ECHL on August 29, 2018. Ross began the 2018–19 season, in playing 8 games with the Komets before he was traded to the South Carolina Stingrays in exchange for Jake Kamrass on November 4, 2018. Without appearing for the Stingrays, Ross was moved on in a trade to the Atlanta Gladiators on November 11, 2018. Two days later, Ross returned to the AHL in signing a contract with the Gladiators secondary affiliate, the Milwaukee Admirals. Ross appeared in 25 regular season games with the Admirals, helping him surpass 300 career AHL games, in posting 4 goals and 7 points.

As a free agent from the Admirals, Ross returned to the ECHL over the summer to agree to a one-year contract with the Jacksonville Icemen on September 5, 2019. Ross began the 2019–20 season with the Icemen, contributing 6 goals and 11 points in 19 games, before he was traded to the Kalamazoo Wings on December 19, 2019.

== Personal ==
In March 2016, Ross was charged with a felony revenge porn charge for disseminating a photo of a woman engaged in a sexual act. Officials said Ross should have known that the image was to remain private, and that the woman had not consented to the dissemination. The IceHogs suspended Garret indefinitely pending the outcome of his legal proceedings. In March 2016, charges were dropped against Ross because the images had not been disseminated in Illinois. They were disseminated in Michigan, and the offense is a misdemeanour there.

== Career statistics ==
			Regular season					Playoffs
Season	Team	League	GP	G	A	Pts	PIM	GP	G	A	Pts	PIM
2009–10	Saginaw Spirit	OHL	43	7	4	11	103	6	0	0	0	12
2010–11	Saginaw Spirit	OHL	53	6	9	15	111	12	3	1	4	8
2011–12	Saginaw Spirit	OHL	60	25	29	54	93	12	6	4	10	23
2012–13	Saginaw Spirit	OHL	61	44	46	90	114	4	0	3	3	8
2012–13	Rockford IceHogs	AHL	2	0	0	0	5	—	—	—	—	—
2013–14	Rockford IceHogs	AHL	74	15	19	34	78	—	—	—	—	—
2014–15	Rockford IceHogs	AHL	69	21	22	43	100	8	2	1	3	2
2015–16	Rockford IceHogs	AHL	65	7	13	20	109	—	—	—	—	—
2016–17	Tucson Roadrunners	AHL	27	1	3	4	39	—	—	—	—	—
2017–18	Rochester Americans	AHL	51	7	6	13	66	1	0	0	0	0
2018–19	Fort Wayne Komets	ECHL	8	0	2	2	19	—	—	—	—	—
2018–19	Atlanta Gladiators	ECHL	6	2	5	7	6	—	—	—	—	—
2018–19	Milwaukee Admirals	AHL	25	4	3	7	50	1	0	0	0	0
2019–20	Jacksonville Icemen	ECHL	19	6	5	11	63	—	—	—	—	—
2019–20	Kalamazoo Wings	ECHL	31	6	16	22	37	—	—	—	—	—
AHL totals			313	55	66	121	447	10	2	1	3	2

== Awards and honors ==
Award	Year
OHL
Second All-Star Team	2012–13
