= Michael Houser (ice hockey) =

American ice hockey goaltender (born 1992)

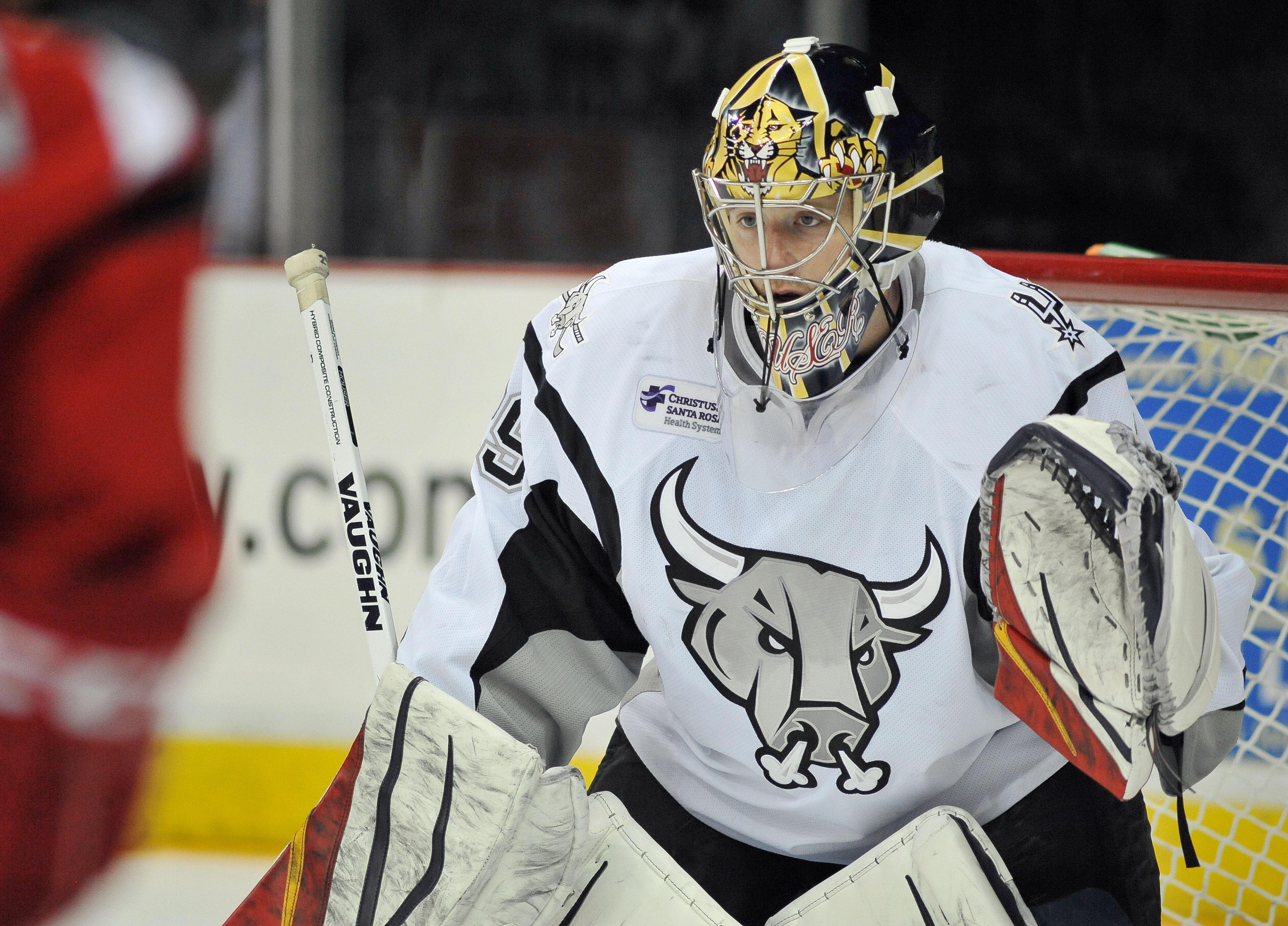
- Houser with the San Antonio Rampage in 2015
- Born: September 13, 1992 (age 33) Youngstown, Ohio, U.S.
- Height: 6 ft 1 in (185 cm)
- Weight: 185 lb (84 kg; 13 st 3 lb)
- Position: Goaltender
- Caught: Left
- Played for: San Antonio Rampage; Ontario Reign; Cleveland Monsters; Tucson Roadrunners; Rochester Americans; Buffalo Sabres; HK 32 Liptovský Mikuláš
- NHL draft: Undrafted
- Playing career: 2012–2026

Michael Houser (born September 13, 1992) is an American former professional ice hockey goaltender. He is currently serving as the director of goaltending for the Youngstown Phantoms of the United States Hockey League (USHL). He has previously played with the Buffalo Sabres of the National Hockey League (NHL).

== Playing career ==
Following a lone season with the Des Moines Buccaneers of the United States Hockey League (USHL), Houser joined the Ontario Hockey League's (OHL) London Knights for the 2009–10 season. Going (17–4–1) in 25 appearances, he was named to the Canadian Hockey League (CHL) All-Rookie Team and the OHL First All-Rookie Team. The 2011–12 season saw Houser go (46–15–5) in 62 games. He was rewarded with the Jim Rutherford Trophy for OHL goaltender of the year as well as the Red Tilson Trophy for the league's most outstanding player. Houser was also recognized as the CHL Goaltender of the Year. The Knights won the J. Ross Robertson Cup as league champions but were defeated by the host Shawinigan Cataractes in the final of the Memorial Cup.

Undrafted, Houser attended the Florida Panthers' 2012 development camp. On July 11, the Panthers signed him to a three-year, entry-level contract. He spent his first professional season playing for the Cincinnati Cyclones of the East Coast Hockey League (ECHL). Houser moved to the San Antonio Rampage of the American Hockey League (AHL) for the 2013–14 season, going 12–13–1.

The Panthers chose not to tender Houser with a qualifying offer following the 2014–15 season, rendering him an unrestricted free agent. He skated with both the AHL's Ontario Reign and the ECHL's Manchester Monarchs for the 2015–16 season.

Houser attended the Columbus Blue Jackets' 2016 training camp but was not signed. He instead signed with the team's AHL affiliate, the Cleveland Monsters on October 14. Aside from a lone appearance with the Monsters, Houser spent the majority of the season with the Cyclones.

Houser once again attended an NHL training camp the following season, this time for the Arizona Coyotes. He was released on September 18, but spent the season with their affiliates (the AHL's Tucson Roadrunners and ECHL's Fort Wayne Komets).

As the Cyclones goaltender for the 2018–19 season, Houser had a 29–7–5 record in 41 games. He was named ECHL Goaltender of the Year as well as a member of the league's first all-star team.

On September 11, 2020, the Rochester Americans re-signed Houser to a one-year contract. He remained on the Americans' roster as the Cyclones—an affiliate of the Americans—opted out of the 2020–21 season due to the COVID-19 pandemic. On March 19, 2021, the Buffalo Sabres signed Houser to a one-year contract for the remainder of the season. He subsequently spent time on the team's taxi squad. Houser made his NHL debut on May 3, stopping 34 shots in a 4–2 win over the New York Islanders. Speaking about making the NHL and winning his first game, he stated "I've worked my whole life for this, for it to happen. Just to play a game is really special. But to win, winning is always the goal. That's why we play." Houser started a second-straight game against the Islanders the following night, this time making 45 saves in a 4–3 shootout win.

As a free agent following his stint with the Sabres, Houser continued within the organization in agreeing to a one-year contract to remain with the Rochester Americans on August 5, 2021. With the Sabres suffering a spate of goaltender injuries for the second consecutive season, Houser was signed to a one-year, two-way contract in returning to the NHL with Buffalo on January 12, 2022.

On July 15, 2022, Houser was familiarly re-signed to remain within the Sabres organization, agreeing to a one-year AHL contract to continue with the Rochester Americans.

Houser returned for his fifth season in the Americans organization, signing as a free agent from the Sabres on a one-year AHL contract on July 7, 2023.

== Career statistics ==
			Regular season									Playoffs
Season	Team	League	GP	W	L	OT	MIN	GA	SO	GAA	SV%	GP	W	L	MIN	GA	SO	GAA	SV%
2008–09	Des Moines Buccaneers	USHL	32	5	18	0	1523	102	0	4.02	.902	—	—	—	—	—	—	—	—
2009–10	London Knights	OHL	25	17	4	1	1450	75	0	3.10	.900	3	0	0	53	7	0	7.92	.821
2010–11	London Knights	OHL	54	30	19	5	3088	171	1	3.32	.904	6	2	4	332	15	0	2.71	.940
2011–12	London Knights	OHL	62	46	15	1	3698	152	6	2.47	.925	19	16	3	1173	44	1	2.25	.928
2012–13	Cincinnati Cyclones	ECHL	29	17	10	2	1694	72	2	2.55	.917	17	9	8	1154	43	1	2.24	.915
2013–14	San Antonio Rampage	AHL	28	12	13	1	1473	75	1	3.05	.903	—	—	—	—	—	—	—	—
2013–14	Cincinnati Cyclones	ECHL	12	5	6	1	724	27	1	2.24	.924	—	—	—	—	—	—	—	—
2014–15	San Antonio Rampage	AHL	37	19	9	4	2081	98	2	2.83	.900	1	0	1	64	4	0	3.75	.897
2015–16	Manchester Monarchs	ECHL	16	10	4	2	963	43	0	2.68	.912	—	—	—	—	—	—	—	—
2015–16	Ontario Reign	AHL	6	1	4	0	321	13	0	2.43	.903	1	0	0	20	0	0	0.00	1.000
2016–17	Cincinnati Cyclones	ECHL	41	22	14	3	2300	99	2	2.58	.919	—	—	—	—	—	—	—	—
2016–17	Cleveland Monsters	AHL	1	0	0	0	20	1	0	3.00	.750	—	—	—	—	—	—	—	—
2017–18	Fort Wayne Komets	ECHL	45	28	11	4	2552	116	2	2.73	.909	17	10	7	1081	44	0	2.44	.914
2017–18	Tucson Roadrunners	AHL	1	0	0	0	9	0	0	0.00	1.000	—	—	—	—	—	—	—	—
2018–19	Cincinnati Cyclones	ECHL	41	29	7	5	2394	85	2	2.13	.922	11	5	6	649	26	1	2.40	.923
2019–20	Cincinnati Cyclones	ECHL	26	16	5	5	1556	59	2	2.27	.902	—	—	—	—	—	—	—	—
2020–21	Buffalo Sabres	NHL	4	2	2	0	243	14	0	3.46	.901	—	—	—	—	—	—	—	—
2020–21	Rochester Americans	AHL	4	1	3	0	232	9	0	2.33	.924	—	—	—	—	—	—	—	—
2021–22	Cincinnati Cyclones	ECHL	18	6	9	1	1027	58	0	3.39	.893	5	2	3	324	14	1	2.59	.928
2021–22	Rochester Americans	AHL	11	5	4	0	584	29	0	2.98	.900	2	0	0	44	2	0	2.74	.920
2021–22	Buffalo Sabres	NHL	2	2	0	0	120	4	0	2.00	.948	—	—	—	—	—	—	—	—
2022–23	Rochester Americans	AHL	21	9	8	2	1199	56	1	2.80	.906	—	—	—	—	—	—	—	—
2023–24	Rochester Americans	AHL	7	3	1	1	319	18	0	3.39	.871	—	—	—	—	—	—	—	—
2023–24	Jacksonville Icemen	ECHL	23	10	10	2	1290	55	2	2.56	.907	—	—	—	—	—	—	—	—
2024–25	Rochester Americans	AHL	14	5	4	2	743	35	0	2.83	.893	—	—	—	—	—	—	—	—
2024–25	Jacksonville Icemen	ECHL	4	1	3	0	236	10	0	2.54	.921	—	—	—	—	—	—	—	—
NHL totals			6	4	2	0	364	18	0	2.97	.917	—	—	—	—	—	—	—	—

== Awards and honors ==
Award	Year
OHL
All-Rookie Team	2009–10
CHL All-Rookie Team	2009–10
First Team All-Star	2011–12
Goaltender of the Year	2011–12
Red Tilson Trophy – Most Outstanding Player	2011–12
CHL Memorial Cup All-Star Team	2012
ECHL
First All-Star Team	2018–19
Goaltender of the Year	2018–19
