= Andrew Crescenzi =

Canadian ice hockey player

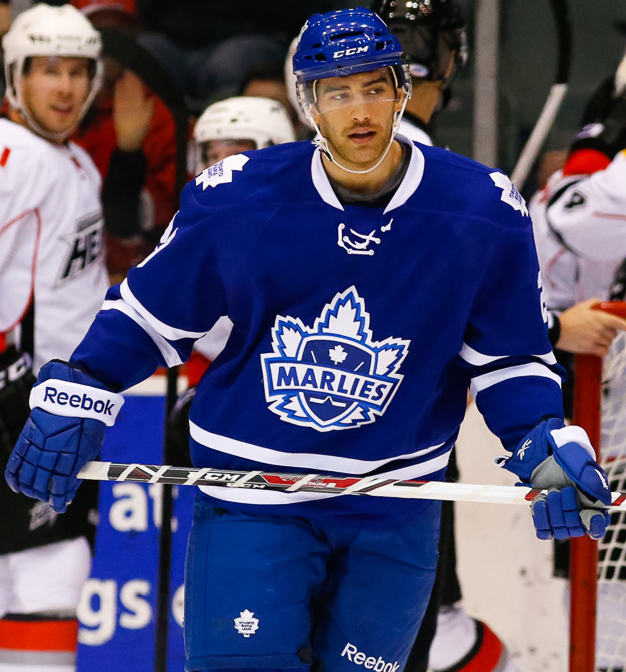
- Crescenzi with the Toronto Marlies in 2013
- Born: July 29, 1992 (age 34) Thornhill, Ontario, Canada
- Height: 6 ft 4 in (193 cm)
- Weight: 198 lb (90 kg; 14 st 2 lb)
- Position: Centre
- Shoots: Left
- EBEL team Former teams: Bozen–Bolzano; Los Angeles Kings
- Playing career: 2011–present

Andrew Crescenzi (born July 29, 1992) is a Canadian former professional ice hockey centre who last played for Bozen–Bolzano of the Austrian Hockey League (EBEL). He had also played for the Los Angeles Kings of the National Hockey League (NHL).

== Playing career ==
Crescenzi first played junior hockey with the Villanova Knights in the Ontario Junior Hockey League. He was selected in the 2008 OHL Priority Draft, 128th overall by the Kitchener Rangers. He later made his debut in the Ontario Hockey League with the Rangers in the 2009–10 season, compiling 12 points.

Undrafted, Crescenzi was invited to the Toronto Maple Leafs 2010 rookie and main roster training camp. He impressed the organization with his physical checking presence and was signed as a free agent to a three-year, entry-level contract on September 29, 2010. At the conclusion his second season of major junior with the Rangers in 2010–11, Crescenzi made his professional debut in appearing in 2 games with the Maple Leafs affiliate, the Toronto Marlies of the AHL

After three seasons with the Kitchener Rangers, Crescenzi embarked on his professional career in the 2012–13 season. He split his rookie season between the Marlies and the San Francisco Bulls of the ECHL.

In the 2013–14 season, Crescenzi remained assigned to the Marlies, however was unable to contribute offensively posting 3 points in 32 contests. On January 22, 2014, Crescenzi was traded by the Maple Leafs to the Los Angeles Kings in exchange for Brandon Kozun. He was immediately assigned to play out the remainder of the season in the AHL with the Manchester Monarchs.

After attending his first Kings training camp the following summer, Crescenzi was familiary assigned to continue his tenure with the Monarchs. He improved upon his previous seasons to post 7 goals and 15 points in 54 regular season games. Crescenzi appeared in 18 postseason games, as the Monarchs claimed the Calder Cup in their last season in the AHL.

On July 16, 2015, Crescenzi was signed as a restricted free agent to a one-year contract extension to remain within the Kings organization. He played two further seasons in the AHL with new affiliate the Ontario Reign, before he was re-signed to a one-year, two-way contract extension on July 14, 2017.

In the 2017–18 season, Crescenzi was selected as an alternate captain in his third year with the Reign. On November 14, 2017, Crescenzi received his first recall by the Kings to the NHL. Added to provide a physical spark, Crescenzi made his NHL debut with the Kings that night registering 2 penalty minutes in a 3–2 defeat to the Vancouver Canucks. After two games with the Kings he was returned to the Reign on November 19, 2017.

As a free agent from the Kings in the following off-season, Crescenzi left after five seasons within the organization and signed with Bozen–Bolzano of the Austrian Hockey League (EBEL), on August 9, 2018.

== Career statistics ==
			Regular season					Playoffs
Season	Team	League	GP	G	A	Pts	PIM	GP	G	A	Pts	PIM
2008–09	Villanova Knights	OJHL	45	6	17	23	40	—	—	—	—	—
2009–10	Kitchener Rangers	OHL	68	8	4	12	42	20	1	2	3	11
2010–11	Kitchener Rangers	OHL	55	12	11	23	74	7	1	1	2	6
2010–11	Toronto Marlies	AHL	2	0	1	1	0	—	—	—	—	—
2011–12	Kitchener Rangers	OHL	52	24	23	47	74	15	4	7	11	20
2012–13	Toronto Marlies	AHL	15	1	1	2	17	—	—	—	—	—
2012–13	San Francisco Bulls	ECHL	23	3	11	14	28	—	—	—	—	—
2013–14	Toronto Marlies	AHL	32	1	1	2	33	—	—	—	—	—
2013–14	Manchester Monarchs	AHL	14	1	1	2	8	—	—	—	—	—
2014–15	Manchester Monarchs	AHL	54	7	8	15	60	18	0	3	3	19
2015–16	Ontario Reign	AHL	67	5	16	21	56	12	1	2	3	2
2016–17	Ontario Reign	AHL	56	7	8	15	57	—	—	—	—	—
2017–18	Ontario Reign	AHL	57	12	12	24	65	—	—	—	—	—
2017–18	Los Angeles Kings	NHL	2	0	0	0	2	—	—	—	—	—
NHL totals			2	0	0	0	2	—	—	—	—	—

== Awards and honors ==
Award	Year
AHL
Calder Cup	2015
