= Brady Austin =

Canadian ice hockey player (born 1993)

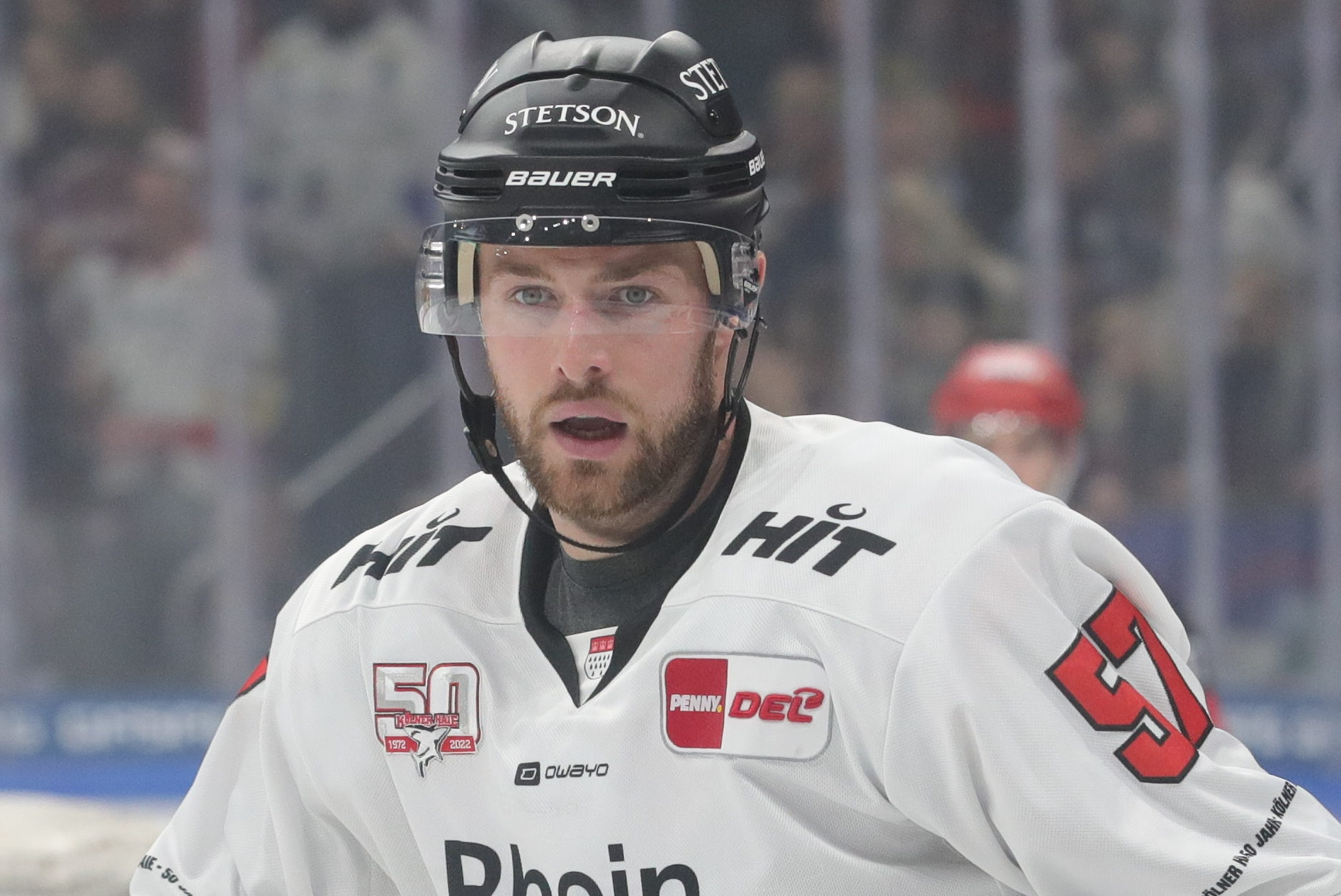
- Austin in 2023
- Born: June 16, 1993 (age 33) Bobcaygeon, Ontario, Canada
- Height: 6 ft 4 in (193 cm)
- Weight: 225 lb (102 kg; 16 st 1 lb)
- Position: Defence
- Shoots: Left
- DEL team Former teams: Kölner Haie; Buffalo Sabres; Esbjerg Energy; Rytíři Kladno; Torpedo Nizhny Novgorod; Tappara
- NHL draft: 193rd overall, 2012; Buffalo Sabres
- Playing career: 2014–present

Brady Austin (born June 16, 1993) is a Canadian professional ice hockey defenceman. He is currently playing for Kölner Haie in the Deutsche Eishockey Liga (DEL). Austin was selected in the seventh round (193rd overall) of the 2012 NHL entry draft by the Buffalo Sabres.

== Playing career ==
=== Amateur ===
Austin played major junior hockey in the Ontario Hockey League (OHL) from 2009–10 to 2013–14, collecting 29 goals and 81 assists for 110 points in 322 games.

Austin was drafted by the Erie Otters 30th overall in the 2009 OHL Draft. He was traded to the Belleville Bulls prior to the 2011–12 season in exchange for goaltender Tyson Teichmann. In his fifth year in the OHL, Austin was traded to the London Knights in exchange for Remi Elie.

=== Professional ===
On May 29, 2014, the Buffalo Sabres of the National Hockey League signed Austin to a three-year entry-level contract. After attending the Sabres training camp, Austin was reassigned to AHL affiliate, the Rochester Americans, to begin his professional career in the 2014–15 season.

During the 2016–17 season, on March 20, 2017, Austin made his NHL debut against the Detroit Red Wings. This was also the final game the Sabres played at Joe Louis Arena.

At the conclusion of his entry-level contract, Austin as a restricted free agent did not receive a qualifying offer from the Sabres, releasing him to free agency on June 26, 2017.

He was given a tryout by the Columbus Blue Jackets prior to the 2017–18 season, but they did not sign him to a contract. He later signed a professional try-out contract with their AHL affiliate, the Cleveland Monsters, to begin the year. On November 11, 2017, it turned into a standard player contract for the rest of the season. While playing with the Monsters, Austin was named to the 2018 AHL All-Star Classic as a replacement for Dean Kukan. In 65 games with the Monsters, Austin recorded career highs with 6 goals, 17 assists and 23 points.

As an unsigned free agent over the summer, Austin received a second successive tryout invitation to attend the Columbus Blue Jackets training camp. He was later released and returned with the Monsters to train before later leaving at the beginning of the 2018–19 season, agreeing to a professional try-out deal with the Stockton Heat, affiliate to the Calgary Flames on October 11, 2018. After appearing in two games, Austin was released from his tryout opting to embark on a European career in agreeing to a one-year contract with Danish club, Esbjerg Energy of the Metal Ligaen on December 2, 2018.

After one season in the Czech Extraliga with Rytíři Kladno, Austin opted to extend his career abroad, agreeing to a one-year contract as a free agent with Russian club, Torpedo Nizhny Novgorod of the Kontinental Hockey League (KHL), on May 18, 2020.

Having claimed the Finnish Liiga championship with Tappara in the 2021–22 season, Austin continued his journeyman European career in signing a one-year contract with German club, Kölner Haie of the DEL, on July 5, 2022.

== Career statistics ==
			Regular season					Playoffs
Season	Team	League	GP	G	A	Pts	PIM	GP	G	A	Pts	PIM
2009–10	Erie Otters	OHL	64	5	10	15	24	4	0	0	0	0
2010–11	Erie Otters	OHL	59	1	12	13	47	7	0	0	0	0
2011–12	Belleville Bulls	OHL	68	6	20	26	59	6	1	0	1	0
2012–13	Belleville Bulls	OHL	64	8	15	23	22	17	0	5	5	6
2013–14	Belleville Bulls	OHL	7	1	4	5	6	—	—	—	—	—
2013–14	London Knights	OHL	60	8	20	28	36	4	1	2	3	2
2014–15	Rochester Americans	AHL	66	1	9	10	31	—	—	—	—	—
2014–15	Elmira Jackals	ECHL	1	0	0	0	0	—	—	—	—	—
2015–16	Rochester Americans	AHL	72	2	9	11	37	—	—	—	—	—
2016–17	Rochester Americans	AHL	72	4	8	12	59	—	—	—	—	—
2016–17	Buffalo Sabres	NHL	5	0	0	0	4	—	—	—	—	—
2017–18	Cleveland Monsters	AHL	65	6	17	23	42	—	—	—	—	—
2018–19	Stockton Heat	AHL	2	0	0	0	0	—	—	—	—	—
2018–19	Esbjerg Energy	DEN	18	3	6	9	51	7	1	3	4	4
2019–20	Rytíři Kladno	ELH	52	18	25	43	26	—	—	—	—	—
2020–21	Torpedo Nizhny Novgorod	KHL	50	4	10	14	39	4	0	0	0	2
2021–22	Tappara	Liiga	52	4	9	13	38	15	1	6	7	4
2022–23	Kölner Haie	DEL	56	9	16	25	31	6	1	2	3	4
2023–24	Kölner Haie	DEL	48	3	12	15	26	3	1	1	2	0
2024–25	Kölner Haie	DEL	47	7	11	18	20	17	2	4	6	2
NHL totals			5	0	0	0	4	—	—	—	—	—

== Awards and honours ==
Award	Year	Ref
AHL
All-Star Game	2018	
Liiga
Kanada-malja (Tappara)	2022	
