= Jaroslav Pavelka =

Czech ice hockey player

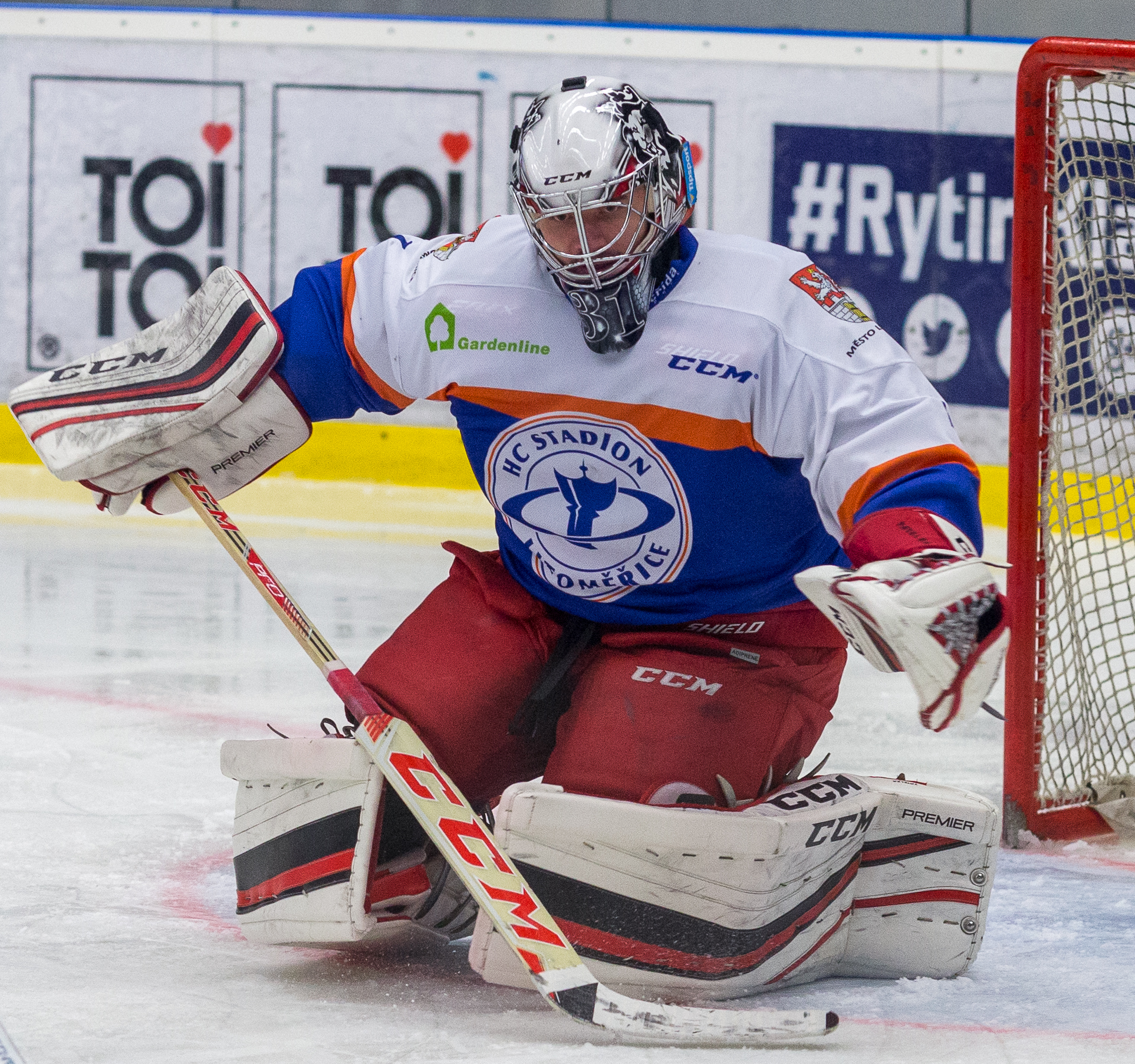
- Pavelka with HC Stadion Litoměřice in 2016
- Born: September 12, 1993 (age 32) Dvůr Králové nad Labem, Czech Republic
- Height: 6 ft 2 in (188 cm)
- Weight: 201 lb (91 kg; 14 st 5 lb)
- Position: Goaltender
- Catches: Left
- ELH team (P) Cur. team Former teams: HC Bílí Tygři Liberec; HC Benátky nad Jizerou (Chance Liga); Mountfield HK
- NHL draft: Undrafted
- Playing career: 2013–present

Jaroslav Pavelka (born September 12, 1993) is a Czech professional ice hockey goaltender. He is currently playing for HC Benátky nad Jizerou of the Chance Liga on loan from HC Bílí Tygři Liberec.

Pavelka previously played for Mountfield HK from 2013 to 2019, playing 50 games for the team. He also had load spells with HC Vrchlabí, HC Stadion Litoměřice and VHK Vsetín during his time with the club. On May 1, 2019, Pavelka joined HC Plzeň but never played for the team. He would go out on loan to HC Baník Sokolov during the season but only featured in one game for the team. On May 26, 2020, Pavelka signed for HC Bílí Tygři Liberec but was sent out on loan again by September, this time to HC Benátky nad Jizerou.

Pavelka was ranked 3rd amongst European goalies in the 2011 NHL entry draft but was subsequently left undrafted. He was selected 52nd overall in the 2011 CHL Import Draft by the Ontario Hockey League's Niagara IceDogs, playing seven games for the team before moving to the Windsor Spitfires.
