= Ondřej Kopta =

Czech ice hockey left winger

- Born: April 17, 1995 (age 30) Plzeň, Czech Republic
- Height: 6 ft 3 in (191 cm)
- Weight: 185 lb (84 kg; 13 st 3 lb)
- Position: Left wing
- Shoots: Left
- Ligue Magnus team Former teams: Etoile Noire de Strasbourg; Mountfield HK
- Playing career: 2014–present

Ondřej Kopta (born April 17, 1995) is a Czech professional ice hockey left winger playing for Aigles de Nice of the Ligue Magnus.

Kopta began his career playing junior hockey for HC Plzeň before spending two seasons in North America. He played the 2011–12 season with the Texas Tornado of the North American Hockey League and the 2012–13 season with the Niagara Ice Dogs of the Ontario Hockey League before returning to Plzeň.

On July 3, 2014, Kopta moved to Mountfield HK and made his debut for the main roster during the 2014–15 Czech Extraliga season. He would go on to play in 58 regular season games for the team from 2014 to 2017. He also had loan spells in the 1st Czech Republic Hockey League with BK Havlíčkův Brod, HC Stadion Litoměřice, HC Slavia Praha, VHK Vsetín and HC ZUBR Přerov.

On June 21, 2019, Kopta moved to France and joined Aigles de Nice of the Ligue Magnus.
