= 2009–10 OHL season =

- League: Ontario Hockey League
- Sport: Hockey
- Duration: Preseason; Aug. 29, 2009 – Sept. 13, 2009; Regular season Sept. 17, 2009 – Mar. 14, 2010; Playoffs; Mar. 18, 2010 – May 4, 2010
- Teams: 20
- TV partner(s): Rogers TV, TVCogeco

Draft
- Top draft pick: Daniel Catenacci
- Picked by: Sault Ste. Marie Greyhounds

Regular season
- Hamilton Spectator Trophy: Barrie Colts (1)
- Season MVP: Tyler Seguin (Plymouth Whalers)
- Top scorer: Tyler Seguin (Plymouth Whalers) & Taylor Hall (Windsor Spitfires)

Playoffs
- Playoffs MVP: Adam Henrique (Spitfires)
- Finals champions: Windsor Spitfires (3)
- Runners-up: Barrie Colts

OHL seasons
- 2008–09 2010–11

2009–10 CHL season
- League: Canadian Hockey League
- Sport: Hockey
- Duration: OHL; Sept. 17, 2009 – Mar. 14, 2010; QMJHL; Sept. 10, 2009 – Mar. 14, 2010; WHL; Sept. 17, 2009 – Mar. 14, 2010
- Teams: 60
- Season MVP: Jordan Eberle (Regina Pats) (WHL)
- Top scorer: Brandon Kozun (Calgary Hitmen) (WHL)

Memorial Cup
- Finals champions: Windsor Spitfires (OHL) (2nd title)
- Runners-up: Brandon Wheat Kings (WHL)

The 2009–10 OHL season was the 30th season of the Ontario Hockey League (OHL). Twenty teams played 68 games each during the regular season schedule, which started on September 17, 2009, and ended on March 14, 2010. On September 9, 2009, all 20 teams in the OHL unveiled their new Reebok Edge jerseys, which have been used in the National Hockey League (NHL) from 2007 until 2017. The playoffs began on March 18, 2010, and ended on May 4, 2010, with the Windsor Spitfires winning the J. Ross Robertson Cup for the second consecutive year, which they followed up by winning the 2010 Memorial Cup, hosted by the Brandon Wheat Kings of the WHL in Brandon, Manitoba.

== Regular season ==
=== Final standings ===
Note: DIV = Division; GP = Games played; W = Wins; L = Losses; OTL = Overtime losses; SL = Shootout losses; GF = Goals for; GA = Goals against; PTS = Points; x = clinched playoff berth; y = clinched division title; z = clinched conference title

=== Eastern conference ===
Rank	Team	DIV	GP	W	L	OTL	SL	PTS	GF	GA
1	z-Barrie Colts	Central	68	57	9	0	2	116	327	186
2	y-Ottawa 67's	East	68	37	23	5	3	82	246	219
3	x-Mississauga St. Michael's Majors	Central	68	42	20	4	2	90	222	175
4	x-Kingston Frontenacs	East	68	33	30	2	3	71	229	251
5	x-Brampton Battalion	Central	68	25	29	7	7	64	167	181
6	x-Peterborough Petes	East	68	29	35	1	3	62	231	277
7	x-Niagara IceDogs	Central	68	26	34	2	6	60	191	233
8	x-Sudbury Wolves	Central	68	26	35	4	3	59	193	267
9	Oshawa Generals	East	68	24	39	3	2	53	216	299
10	Belleville Bulls	East	68	20	40	2	6	48	189	263

=== Western conference ===
Rank	Team	DIV	GP	W	L	OTL	SL	PTS	GF	GA
1	z-Windsor Spitfires	West	68	50	12	1	5	106	331	203
2	y-London Knights	Midwest	68	49	16	1	2	101	273	208
3	x-Kitchener Rangers	Midwest	68	42	19	4	3	91	286	236
4	x-Plymouth Whalers	West	68	38	27	1	2	79	245	201
5	x-Sault Ste. Marie Greyhounds	West	68	36	27	1	4	77	237	213
6	x-Saginaw Spirit	West	68	34	27	4	3	75	240	230
7	x-Guelph Storm	Midwest	68	35	29	3	1	74	242	255
8	x-Erie Otters	Midwest	68	33	28	5	2	73	257	259
9	Owen Sound Attack	Midwest	68	27	33	4	4	62	221	276
10	Sarnia Sting	West	68	17	46	2	3	39	184	295

=== Scoring leaders ===
Note: GP = Games played; G = Goals; A = Assists; Pts = Points; PIM = Penalty minutes As of the end of the season, March 14

Player	Team	GP	G	A	Pts	PIM
Tyler Seguin	Plymouth Whalers	63	48	58	106	54
Taylor Hall	Windsor Spitfires	57	40	66	106	56
Luke Pither	Barrie Colts	67	36	58	94	44
Taylor Beck	Guelph Storm	61	39	54	93	54
Nazem Kadri	London Knights	56	35	58	93	105
Zack Torquato	Erie Otters	68	31	62	93	72
Jeff Skinner	Kitchener Rangers	64	50	40	90	72
Chris MacKinnon	Kitchener Rangers	64	29	61	90	78
Jordan Skellett	Saginaw Spirit	66	26	62	88	16
Mike Cazzola	Erie Otters	68	36	50	86	74

=== Leading goaltenders ===
Note: GP = Games played; Mins = Minutes played; W = Wins; L = Losses: OTL = Overtime losses; SL = Shootout losses; GA = Goals Allowed; SO = Shutouts; SV% = Save Percentage; GAA = Goals against average

Player	Team	GP	Mins	W	L	OTL	SL	GA	SO	SV%	GAA
Mavric Parks	Kitchener/Barrie	33	1920	25	5	1	1	75	2	0.930	2.34
Chris Carrozzi	Mississauga St. Michael's Majors	37	2089	19	10	3	2	82	5	0.916	2.36
Patrick Killeen	Brampton Battalion	63	3693	23	25	6	7	149	5	0.913	2.42
J. P. Anderson	Mississauga St. Michael's Majors	36	2028	23	10	1	0	88	2	0.899	2.60
Matt Hackett	Plymouth Whalers	56	3165	33	18	1	2	138	4	0.925	2.62

== Playoffs ==
Conference quarterfinals	Conference Semifinals
1	Barrie	4
8	Sudbury	0
1	Barrie	4
5	Brampton	0
4	Kingston	3
5	Brampton	4
Eastern
3	Mississauga	4
6	Peterborough	0
3	Mississauga	4
2	Ottawa	3
2	Ottawa	4
7	Niagara	1
1	Windsor	4
8	Erie	0
1	Windsor	4
4	Plymouth	0
4	Plymouth	4
5	S.S. Marie	1
Western
3	Kitchener	4
6	Saginaw	2
3	Kitchener	4
2	London	3
2	London	4
7	Guelph	1

Conference finals
1	Barrie	4
3	Mississauga	1
1	Windsor	4
3	Kitchener	3

Finals
E1	Barrie	0
W1	Windsor	4

=== Conference quarterfinals ===
==== Eastern conference ====
===== (1) Barrie Colts vs. (8) Sudbury Wolves =====
March 18	Barrie Colts	11 – 4	Sudbury Wolves	Barrie Molson Centre	Recap
12:10 - Alexander Burmistrov (1); 16:54 - Alexander Burmistrov (2); 17:33 - Zac Rinaldo (1); 18:43 - Matt Kennedy (1)		First period	John McFarland (1) - pp - 1:13
4:50 - Alex Hutchings (1); 7:56 - Bryan Cameron (1); 8:50 - Dalton Prout (1); 11:06 - Taylor Carnevale (1)		Second period	Marcus Foligno (1) - 11:43; Kain Allicock (1) - 17:08
4:34 - Stefan Della Rovere (1); 6:01 - pp - Kyle Clifford (1); 17:27 - pp - Luke Pither (1)		Third period	John McFarland (2) - pp - 0:33
Peter Di Salvo (26 saves / 30 shots)		Goalie stats	Andrew Loverock (17 saves / 22 shots); Alain Valiquette (19 saves / 25 shots)

March 20	Sudbury Wolves	1 – 2	Barrie Colts	Sudbury Arena	Recap
John McFarland (3) - pp - 16:56		First period	4:21 - pp - Alexander Burmistrov (3)
No scoring		Second period	No scoring
No scoring		Third period	0:27 - pp - Bryan Cameron (2)
Andrew Loverock (25 saves / 27 shots)		Goalie stats	Peter Di Salvo (20 saves / 21 shots)

March 21	Barrie Colts	6 – 2	Sudbury Wolves	Barrie Molson Centre	Recap
Bryan Cameron (3) - pp - 9:40; Luke Pither (2) - pp - 16:51		First period	5:14 - pp - Ben Chiarot (1)
Luke Pither (3) - pp - 0:19; Bryan Cameron (4) - pp - 1:26; Alexander Burmistrov (4) - pp - 9:06; Bryan Cameron (5) - pp - 12:23		Second period	No scoring
No scoring		Third period	16:38 - Eddy Leitans-Rinke (1)
Mavric Parks (30 saves / 32 shots)		Goalie stats	Andrew Loverock (45 saves / 51 shots); Alain Valiquette (0 saves / 0 shots)

March 24	Sudbury Wolves	3 – 6	Barrie Colts	Sudbury Arena	Recap
1:29 - pp - Josh McFadden (1)		First period	Stephen Gaskin (1) - 15:05
5:54 - Kristoff Kontos (1)		Second period	Alex Pietrangelo (1) - 1:57; Alexander Burmistrov (5) - 3:32
19:48 - pp - Jake Cardwell (1)		Third period	Darren Archibald (1) - pp - 7:53; Matt Kennedy (2) - 9:14; Bryan Cameron (6) - 14:11
Andrew Loverock (24 saves / 29 shots); Alain Valiquette (6 saves / 7 shots)		Goalie stats	Peter Di Salvo (27 saves / 30 shots)

Barrie won series 4 – 0

===== (2) Ottawa 67's vs. (7) Niagara IceDogs =====
March 19	Ottawa 67's	4 – 3	Niagara IceDogs	Urbandale Centre	Recap
12:33 - Anthony Nigro (1)		First period	No scoring
7:39 - Dalton Smith (1); 19:17 - Tyler Toffoli (1)		Second period	6:00 - pp Josh Moes (1); 8:40 - Andrew Agozzino (1); 14:06 - Andrew Agozzino (2)
16:39 - Tyler Toffoli (2)		Third period	No scoring
Chris Perugini (18 saves / 21 shots)		Goalie stats	Mark Visentin (35 saves / 39 shots)

March 21	Ottawa 67's	3 – 1	Niagara IceDogs	Urbandale Centre	Recap
2:31 - Thomas Nesbitt (1)		First period	No scoring
10:43 - Thomas Nesbitt (2)		Second period	Dylan MacEachern (1) - pp - 14:37
19:08 - en - Thomas Nesbitt (3)		Third period	No scoring
Chris Perugini (36 saves / 37 shots)		Goalie stats	Mark Visentin (31 saves / 33 shots)

March 23	Niagara IceDogs	4 – 5	OT	Ottawa 67's	Gatorade Garden City Complex	Recap
0:34 - Andrew Fritsch (1); 11:55 - Freddie Hamilton (1)		First period		No scoring
No scoring		Second period		Marc Zanetti (1) - 6:35
1:14 - Alex Friesen (1); 1:41 - Andrew Agozzino (3)		Third period		Dalton Smith (2) - 1:33; Tyler Toffoli (3) - 9:37; Anthony Nigro (2) - 18:42
No scoring		First overtime period		5:04 - Ryan Martindale (1)
Mark Visentin (44 saves / 49 shots)		Goalie stats		Chris Perugini (38 saves / 42 shots)

March 25	Niagara IceDogs	5 – 4	Ottawa 67's	Gatorade Garden City Complex	Recap
4:54 - Johnson Andrews (1)		First period	Corey Cowick (1) - pp - 2:36; Anthony Nigro (3) - 7:45; Tyler Toffoli (4) - pp - 14:14
0:24 - pp - Matt Petgrave (1); 12:01 - Michael Hasson (1); 12:28 - Johnson Andrews (2); 14:39 - pp - Reggie Traccitto (1)		Second period	No scoring
No scoring		Third period	Marc Zanetti (2) - pp - 12:50
Mark Visentin (32 saves / 36 shots)		Goalie stats	Chris Perugini (11 saves / 15 shots); Petr Mrázek (11 saves / 12 shots)

March 28	Ottawa 67's	5 – 1	Niagara IceDogs	Urbandale Centre	Recap
5:09 - Tyler Toffoli (5); 8:15 - pp - Corey Cowick (2)		First period	No scoring
16:23 - Corey Cowick (3)		Second period	Marco Insam (1) - 3:28
17:47 - sh - en - Corey Cowick (4); 19:21 - sh - en - Corey Cowick (5)		Third period	No scoring
Petr Mrázek (31 saves / 32 shots)		Goalie stats	Mark Visentin (26 saves / 29 shots)

Ottawa won series 4 – 1

===== (3) Mississauga St. Michael's Majors vs. (6) Peterborough Petes =====
March 19	Mississauga St. Michael's Majors	4 – 2	Peterborough Petes	Hershey Centre	Recap
12:08 - Jordan Mayer (1)		First period	No scoring
No scoring		Second period	Matt Puempel (1) - 3:39
6:38 - ps - Rob Flick (1); 11:27 - Blake Parlett (1); 19:35 - en - Dustin Ekelman (1)		Third period	Austin Watson (1) - 6:25
Chris Carrozzi (27 saves / 29 shots)		Goalie stats	Jason Missiaen (29 saves / 32 shots)

March 22	Peterborough Petes	1 – 2	Mississauga St. Michael's Majors	Peterborough Memorial Centre	Recap
8:16 - Jamie Wise (1)		First period	17:26 - Dustin Ekelman (2)
No scoring		Second period	19:54 - pp - Devante Smith-Pelly (1)
No scoring		Third period	No scoring
Jason Missiaen (36 saves / 38 shots)		Goalie stats	Chris Carrozzi (18 saves / 19 shots)

March 23	Mississauga St. Michael's Majors	5 – 3	Peterborough Petes	Hershey Centre	Recap
Rob Flick (2) - 8:22; Jordan Mayer (2) - pp - 17:19		First period	6:16 - Austin Watson (2)
Devante Smith-Pelly (2) = 1:34; Casey Cizikas (1) - 13:25		Second period	17:32 - Joey West (1)
Devante Smith-Pelly (3) - en - 19:20		Third period	0:45 - pp - Chris Breen (1)
Chris Carrozzi (29 saves / 32 shots)		Goalie stats	Jason Missiaen (32 saves / 36 shots)

March 25	Peterborough Petes	0 – 3	Mississauga St. Michael's Majors	Peterborough Memorial Centre	Recap
No scoring		First period	No scoring
No scoring		Second period	Dustin Ekelman (3) - 9:57; Devante Smith-Pelly (4) - pp - 16:47
No scoring		Third period	Ryan Lopes (1) - sh - en - 18:05
Jason Missiaen (39 saves / 41 shots)		Goalie stats	Chris Carrozzi (27 saves / 27 shots)

Mississauga won series 4 – 0

===== (4) Kingston Frontenacs vs. (5) Brampton Battalion =====
March 19	Kingston Frontenacs	2 – 4	Brampton Battalion	Rogers K-Rock Centre	Recap
12:11 - Zach Harnden (1)		First period	No scoring
No scoring		Second period	Craig Moore (1) - 2:14; Scott Tanski (1) - pp - 15:29; Cody Hodgson (1) - 18:05
3:31 - Nathan Moon (1)		Third period	Scott Tanski (2) - en - 19:48
Tyler Beskorowany (32 saves / 35 shots)		Goalie stats	Patrick Killeen (20 saves / 22 shots)

March 21	Brampton Battalion	5 – 1	Kingston Frontenacs	Powerade Centre	Recap
Craig Moore (2) - 4:23; Phil Lane (1) - 14:08; Sam Carrick (1) - 16:31		First period	No scoring
Matt MacLeod (1) - 11:14		Second period	15:32 - Kaine Geldart (1)
Cody Hodgson (2) - sh - 13:33		Third period	No scoring
Patrick Killeen (25 saves / 26 shots)		Goalie stats	Tyler Beskorowany (32 saves / 37 shots)

March 23	Kingston Frontenacs	4 – 2	Brampton Battalion	Rogers K-Rock Centre	Recap
Ethan Werek (1) - pp - 18:55		First period	11:55 - Barclay Goodrow (1)
Nathan Moon (2) - pp - 5:20		Second period	11:05 - Matt Clarke (1)
Michael Farrell (1) - 8:16; Michael Fine (1) - 13:02		Third period	No scoring
Tyler Beskorowany (28 saves / 30 shots)		Goalie stats	Patrick Killeen (32 saves / 36 shots)

March 25	Brampton Battalion	4 – 7	Kingston Frontenacs	Powerade Centre	Recap
No scoring		First period	Ethan Werek (2) - 1:23; Alan Quine (1) - 2:52; Kaine Geldart (2) - 4:58
6:59 - pp - Matt Clarke (2); 9:52 - Michael Santini (1); 12:07 - Thomas Stajan (1)		Second period	Zach Harnden (2) - 13:03
4:36 - pp - Sean Jones (1)		Third period	Corey Durocher (1) - 2:02; Michael Farrell (2) - 10:04; Michael Fine (2) - en - 19:13
Patrick Killeen (17 saves / 23 shots)		Goalie stats	Tyler Beskorowany (42 saves / 46 shots)

March 26	Kingston Frontenacs	3 – 4	OT	Brampton Battalion	Rogers K-Rock Centre	Recap
No scoring		First period		Scott Tanski (3) - pp - 13:19
10:39 - Corey Durocher (2)		Second period		Michael Santini (2) - 13:05
2:56 - Ethan Werek (3); 5:00 - Nathan Moon (3)		Third period		Cody Hodgson (3) - 17:10
No scoring		First overtime period		Sean Jones (2) - 5:38
Tyler Beskorowany (39 saves / 43 shots)		Goalie stats		Patrick Killeen (26 saves / 29 shots)

March 28	Brampton Battalion	1 – 2	Kingston Frontenacs	Powerade Centre	Recap
10:43 - pp - Sean Jones (3)		First period	No scoring
No scoring		Second period	Taylor Doherty (1) - 8:31; Erik Gudbranson (1) - 18:35
No scoring		Third period	No scoring
Patrick Killeen (23 saves / 25 shots)		Goalie stats	Tyler Beskorowany (31 saves / 32 shots)

March 30	Kingston Frontenacs	2 – 5	Brampton Battalion	Rogers K-Rock Centre	Recap
No scoring		First period	Phil Lane (2) - pp - 2:55
No scoring		Second period	Stephon Thorne (1) - 7:34; Phil Lane (3) - 9:56; Sean Jones (4) - pp - 14:39
0:41 - pp - Zach Harnden (3); 2:26 - Charles Sarault (1)		Third period	Sean Jones (5) - en - 19:23
Tyler Beskorowany (35 saves / 39 shots)		Goalie stats	Patrick Killeen (27 saves / 29 shots)

Brampton won series 4 – 3

==== Western conference ====
===== (1) Windsor Spitfires vs. (8) Erie Otters =====
March 18	Windsor Spitfires	6 – 2	Erie Otters	WFCU Centre	Recap
10:59 - Justin Shugg (1)		First period	Greg McKegg (1) - sh - 5:19
8:23 - Dale Mitchell (1); 12:45 - Zack Kassian (1); 19:43 - Adam Henrique (1)		Second period	No scoring
7:41 - Adam Henrique (2); 18:13 - Marc Cantin (1)		Third period	Anthony Luciani (1) - 17:23
Philipp Grubauer (19 saves / 21 shots)		Goalie stats	Adam Courchaine (42 saves / 48 shots)

March 21	Erie Otters	1 – 3	Windsor Spitfires	Louis J. Tullio Arena	Recap
No scoring		First period	Taylor Hall (1) - 19:21
4:10 - Zack Torquato (1)		Second period	Dale Mitchell (2) - 17:28
No scoring		Third period	Taylor Hall (2) - 19:18
Adam Courchaine (28 saves / 31 shots)		Goalie stats	Philipp Grubauer (30 saves / 31 shots)

March 23	Windsor Spitfires	7 – 6	Erie Otters	WFCU Centre	Recap
15:00 - pp - Justin Shugg (2); 16:11 - pp - Taylor Hall (3); 17:10 - pp - Mark Cundari (1)		First period	No scoring
16:17 - Kenny Ryan (1); 19:50 - pp - Zack Kassian (2)		Second period	Greg McKegg (2) - 3:50; Derek Holden (1) - pp - 7:25; Brett Cook (1) - 13:23; Mike Cazzola (1) - 16:43
11:10 - Taylor Hall (4); 17:06 - Stephen Johnston (1)		Third period	Shawn Szydlowski (1) - 15:12; Mike Cazzola (2) - pp - 16:58
Philipp Grubauer (13 saves / 19 shots)		Goalie stats	Ramis Sadikov (51 saves / 58 shots)

March 25	Erie Otters	1 – 5	Windsor Spitfires	Louis J. Tullio Arena	Recap
9:12 - Anthony Luciani (2)		First period	Taylor Hall (5) - pp - 7:55; Eric Wellwood (1) - 11:30; Taylor Hall (6) - pp - 14:30
No scoring		Second period	Scott Timmins (1) - sh - 10:20; Adam Wallace (1) - 11:57
No scoring		Third period	No scoring
Ramis Sadikov (31 saves / 36 shots)		Goalie stats	Philipp Grubauer (24 saves / 25 shots); Troy Passingham (2 saves / 2 shots)

Windsor won series 4 – 0

===== (2) London Knights vs. (7) Guelph Storm =====
March 19	London Knights	4 – 3	OT	Guelph Storm	John Labatt Centre	Recap
14:45 - Jared Knight (1)		First period		No scoring
4:45 - pp - Daniel Erlich (1)		Second period		Tyler Carroll (1) - 6:37; Taylor Beck (1) - 11:39
16:32 - Leigh Salters (1)		Third period		Mathew Sisca (1) - 0:30
16:53 - Nazem Kadri (1)		First overtime period		No scoring
Michael Hutchinson (42 saves / 45 shots)		Goalie stats		Brandon Foote (52 saves / 56 shots)

March 21	Guelph Storm	3 – 4	London Knights	Sleeman Centre	Recap
No scoring		First period	19:18 - Jared Knight (2)
Adam Comrie (1) - 15:02		Second period	1:26 - pp - Nazem Kadri (2); 1:57 - Daniel Erlich (2); 18:12 - Tyler Brown (1)
Zack Mitchell (1) - 2:26; Taylor Beck (2) - pp - 16:33		Third period	No scoring
Brandon Foote (28 saves / 32 shots)		Goalie stats	Michael Hutchinson (23 saves / 26 shots)

March 23	London Knights	4 – 5	Guelph Storm	John Labatt Centre	Recap
No scoring		First period	No scoring
Jared Knight (3) - 7:44; Jared Knight (4) - pp - 11:49; Colin Martin (1) - 17:34		Second period	14:43 - Peter Holland (1); 16:42 - pp - Michael Latta (1); 19:03 - Peter Holland (2)
Michael D'Orazio (1) - 13:52		Third period	8:24 - Zack Mitchell (2); 19:23 - pp - Taylor Beck (3)
Michael Hutchinson (26 saves / 31 shots)		Goalie stats	Brandon Foote (26 saves / 30 shots)

March 25	Guelph Storm	2 – 8	London Knights	Sleeman Centre	Recap
Mathew Sisca (2) - 9:59		First period	Seth Griffith (1) - 7:48; Nazem Kadri (3) - pp - 12:14; Justin Taylor (1) - 15:27; Chris DeSousa (1) - pp - 17:52
Mathew Sisca (3) - 3:04		Second period	Kalle Ekelund (1) - 5:03; Leigh Salters (2) - pp - 8:15; Daniel Erlich (3) - 18:55
No scoring		Third period	Tyler Brown (2) - 19:51
Brandon Foote (23 saves / 30 shots); Cody St. Jacques (6 saves / 7 shots)		Goalie stats	Michael Hutchinson (22 saves / 24 shots)

March 26	London Knights	6 – 2	Guelph Storm	John Labatt Centre	Recap
5:08 - Seth Griffith (2); 7:24 - pp - Daniel Erlich (4); 15:14 - Nazem Kadri (4)		First period	Michael Latta (2) - 11:05
3:16 - Jared Knight (5)		Second period	Peter Holland (3) - pp - 6:21
14:02 - pp - Daniel Erlich (5); 16:58 - sh - en - Colin Martin (2)		Third period	No scoring
Michael Hutchinson (23 saves / 25 shots)		Goalie stats	Brandon Foote (25 saves / 30 shots)

London won series 4 – 1

===== (3) Kitchener Rangers vs. (6) Saginaw Spirit =====
March 19	Kitchener Rangers	3 – 2	OT	Saginaw Spirit	Kitchener Memorial Auditorium Complex	Recap
No scoring		First period		Tyler Murovich (1) - pp - 10:25; Ivan Telegin (1) - 19:10
4:01 - Jason Akeson (1); 17:56 - sh - Julian Cimadamore (1)		Second period		No scoring
No scoring		Third period		No scoring
1:14 - Julian Cimadamore (2)		First overtime period		No scoring
Brandon Maxwell (27 saves / 29 shots)		Goalie stats		Edward Pasquale (51 saves / 54 shots)

March 20	Saginaw Spirit	3 – 1	Kitchener Rangers	The Dow Event Center	Recap
No scoring		First period	No scoring
Anthony Camara (1) - 12:31; Jordan Skellett (1) - pp - 16:33		Second period	No scoring
Barry Sanderson (1) - en - 19:34		Third period	14:10 - sh - Michael Catenacci (1)
Edward Pasquale (24 saves / 25 shots)		Goalie stats	Brandon Maxwell (28 saves / 30 shots)

March 22	Kitchener Rangers	2 – 1	Saginaw Spirit	Kitchener Memorial Auditorium Complex	Recap
Jeremy Morin (1) - pp - 17:10		First period	No scoring
No scoring		Second period	No scoring
Jeff Skinner (1) - 1:56		Third period	14:47 - pp - Tyler Murovich (2)
Brandon Maxwell (34 saves / 35 shots)		Goalie stats	Edward Pasquale (44 saves / 46 shots)

March 24	Saginaw Spirit	1 – 4	Kitchener Rangers	The Dow Event Center	Recap
No scoring		First period	No scoring
No scoring		Second period	Dan Kelly (1) - 9:20
18:20 - Vincent Trocheck (1)		Third period	Michael Catenacci (2) - 0:43; Chris MacKinnon (1) - en - 19:02; Jeremy Morin (2) - en - 19:27
Edward Pasquale (23 saves / 25 shots)		Goalie stats	Brandon Maxwell (39 saves / 40 shots)

March 26	Kitchener Rangers	3 – 4	Saginaw Spirit	Kitchener Memorial Auditorium Complex	Recap
No scoring		First period	No scoring
No scoring		Second period	Vincent Trocheck (2) - 2:17; Jordan Szwarz (1) - 13:19; Jordan Hill (1) - pp - 17:26
14:17 - pp - Jeff Skinner (2); 16:43 - pp - Gabriel Landeskog (1); 19:08 - pp - Jeremy Morin (3)		Third period	Mitch Fillman (1) - 2:39
Brandon Maxwell (25 saves / 29 shots)		Goalie stats	Edward Pasquale (45 saves / 48 shots)

March 28	Saginaw Spirit	2 – 4	Kitchener Rangers	The Dow Event Center	Recap
No scoring		First period	Micky Sartoretto (1) - 8:33; Jeff Skinner (3) - 13:34; Julian Cimadamore (3) - 19:57
No scoring		Second period	No scoring
13:22 - Ryan O'Connor (1); 14:33 - Jordan Hill (2)		Third period	Dan Kelly (2) - en - 19:48
Edward Pasquale (36 saves / 39 shots)		Goalie stats	Brandon Maxwell (31 saves / 33 shots)

Kitchener won series 4 – 2

===== (4) Plymouth Whalers vs. (5) Sault Ste. Marie Greyhounds =====
March 19	Plymouth Whalers	2 – 3	Sault Ste. Marie Greyhounds	Compuware Arena	Recap
No scoring		First period	Dominic DeSando (1) - 7:31
No scoring		Second period	No scoring
2:23 - Philip McRae (1); 7:57 - Tyler Seguin (1)		Third period	Jordan Nolan (1) - 9:59; Daniel Catenacci (1) - 17:12
Matt Hackett (41 saves / 44 shots)		Goalie stats	Robin Lehner (30 saves / 32 shots)

March 20	Plymouth Whalers	5 – 2	Sault Ste. Marie Greyhounds	Compuware Arena	Recap
No scoring		First period	Jake Carrick (1) - 16:24
9:31 - James Livingston (1); 12:44 - A.J. Jenks (1); 19:00 - pp - Philip McRae (2)		Second period	No scoring
13:04 - pp - Tyler Seguin (2); 19:05 - en - Joe Gaynor (1)		Third period	Vern Cooper (1) - 12:44
Matt Hackett (11 saves / 12 shots); Scott Wedgewood (13 saves / 14 shots)		Goalie stats	Robin Lehner (43 saves / 47 shots)

March 23	Sault Ste. Marie Greyhounds	1 – 8	Plymouth Whalers	Essar Centre	Recap
No scoring		First period	Ryan Hayes (1) - 4:37; Philip McRae (3) - pp - 10:28; Ryan Hayes (2) - 17:38
7:56 - sh - Tomáš Rachůnek (1)		Second period	Tyler Seguin (3) - pp - 14:54; Leo Jenner (1) - 18:48
No scoring		Third period	Garrett Meurs (1) - 11:08; Jay Gilbert (1) - 12:46; Tyler Brown (1) - 16:53
Robin Lehner (21 saves / 26 shots); Bryce O'Hagan (6 saves / 9 shots)		Goalie stats	Matt Hackett (27 saves / 28 shots); Scott Wedgewood (4 saves / 4 shots)

March 24	Sault Ste. Marie Greyhounds	3 – 5	Plymouth Whalers	Essar Centre	Recap
7:08 - Vern Cooper (2); 13:33 - pp - Myles McCauley (1); 14:45 - Tomáš Rachůnek (2)		First period	Philip McRae (4) - pp - 7:56
No scoring		Second period	Tyler Seguin (4) - pp - 1:18
No scoring		Third period	Ryan Hayes (3) - 1:45; Joe Gaynor (2) - 18:50; Tyler Seguin (5) - en - 19:14
Robin Lehner (20 saves / 24 shots)		Goalie stats	Matt Hackett (45 saves / 48 shots)

March 26	Plymouth Whalers	6 – 2	Sault Ste. Marie Greyhounds	Compuware Arena	Recap
0:44 - Ryan Hayes (4)		First period	Myles McCauley (2) - pp - 6:42
15:24 - A.J. Jenks (2); 19:35 - Philip McRae (5)		Second period	No scoring
5:15 - Philip McRae (6); 17:52 - Tyler Brown (2); 18:46 - en - Josh Brittain (1)		Third period	Brandon Archibald (1) - 13:43
Matt Hackett (33 saves / 35 shots)		Goalie stats	Robin Lehner (25 saves / 30 shots)

Plymouth won series 4 – 1

=== Conference semifinals ===
==== Eastern conference ====
===== (1) Barrie Colts vs. (5) Brampton Battalion =====
April 1	Barrie Colts	5 – 3	Brampton Battalion	Barrie Molson Centre	Recap
13:34 - Alexander Burmistrov (6); 19:13 - Bryan Cameron (7)		First period	Sam Carrick (2) - 14:37
2:55 - Kyle Clifford (2); 11:24 - Stefan Della Rovere (2); 17:57 - pp - Taylor Carnevale (2)		Second period	Thomas Stajan (2) - sh - 7:59
No scoring		Third period	Sean Jones (6) - pp - 12:51
Peter Di Salvo (37 saves / 40 shots)		Goalie stats	Patrick Killeen (37 saves / 42 shots)

April 4	Brampton Battalion	2 – 3	OT	Barrie Colts	Powerade Centre	Recap
Ken Peroff (1) - pp - 13:17		First period		No scoring
No scoring		Second period		8:15 - Matt Kennedy (3)
Ian Watters (1) - 18:58		Third period		12:28 - pp - Alex Pietrangelo (2)
No scoring		First overtime period		3:32 - Luke Pither (4)
Patrick Killeen (39 saves / 42 shots)		Goalie stats		Peter Di Salvo (23 saves / 25 shots)

April 5	Barrie Colts	5 – 1	Brampton Battalion	Barrie Molson Centre	Recap
Alexander Burmistrov (7) - 11:32; Colin Behenna (1) - sh - 18:15		First period	No scoring
Darren Archibald (2) - pp - 3:21; Matt Kennedy (4) - 8:54		Second period	No scoring
Luke Pither (5) - pp - 14:26		Third period	16:42 - Sean Jones (7)
Mavric Parks (41 saves / 42 shots)		Goalie stats	Patrick Killeen (34 saves / 39 shots)

April 7	Brampton Battalion	2 – 5	Barrie Colts	Powerade Centre	Recap
8:00 - Sean Jones		First period	Darren Archibald (3) - 5:56
No scoring		Second period	Bryan Cameron (8) - pp - 0:48; Colin Behenna (2) - 3:58; Stefan Della Rovere (3) - 9:56
2:01 - Domenic Alberga (1)		Third period	Stefan Della Rovere (4) - 7:47
Patrick Killeen (19 saves / 24 shots)		Goalie stats	Mavric Parks (27 saves / 29 shots)

Barrie won series 4 – 0

===== (2) Ottawa 67's vs. (3) Mississauga St. Michael's Majors =====
April 1	Ottawa 67's	1 – 4	Mississauga St. Michael's Majors	Urbandale Centre	Recap
No scoring		First period	William Wallén (1) - 18:57
10:09 - Corey Cowick (6)		Second period	T.J. Battani (1) - 13:30
No scoring		Third period	Gregg Sutch (1) - 3:10; T.J. Battani (2) - en - 19:20
Chris Perugini (34 saves / 37 shots)		Goalie stats	Chris Carrozzi (28 saves / 29 shots)

April 2	Ottawa 67's	7 – 2	Mississauga St. Michael's Majors	Urbandale Centre	Recap
14:29 - Dalton Smith (3); 16:08 - pp - Anthony Nigro (4)		First period	Riley Brace (1) - 1:12
12:12 - pp - Tyler Toffoli (6); 13:24 - Anthony Nigro (5); 17:01 - pp - Corey Cowick (7); 17:48 - Shane Prince (1)		Second period	Casey Cizikas (2) - 10:37
9:39 - pp - Ryan Martindale (2)		Third period	No scoring
Petr Mrázek (26 saves / 28 shots)		Goalie stats	Chris Carrozzi (20 saves / 26 shots); J.P. Anderson (12 saves / 13 shots)

April 4	Mississauga St. Michael's Majors	1 – 2	OT	Ottawa 67's	Hershey Centre	Recap
No scoring		First period		No scoring
4:21 - Casey Cizikas (3)		Second period		Shane Prince (2) - 9:37
No scoring		Third period		No scoring
No scoring		First overtime period		Cody Lindsay (1) - pp - 7:55
Chris Carrozzi (35 saves / 37 shots)		Goalie stats		Petr Mrázek (36 saves / 37 shots)

April 6	Mississauga St. Michael's Majors	2 – 0	Ottawa 67's	Hershey Centre	Recap
No scoring		First period	No scoring
15:55 - Riley Brace (2)		Second period	No scoring
18:23 - Ryan Lopes (2)		Third period	No scoring
J. P. Anderson (25 saves / 25 shots)		Goalie stats	Petr Mrázek (37 saves / 39 shots)

April 8	Ottawa 67's	6 – 3	Mississauga St. Michael's Majors	Urbandale Centre	Recap
7:32 - Ryan Martindale (3); 14:43 - Corey Cowick (8)		First period	Devante Smith-Pelly (5) - 3:38; Gregg Sutch (2) - 9:21; Kelly Geoffrey (1) - 15:19
16:58 - Anthony Nigro (6)		Second period	No scoring
4:12 - Corey Cowick (9); 7:23 - Cody Lindsay (2); 10:52 - Thomas Nesbitt (4)		Third period	No scoring
Petr Mrázek (37 saves / 40 shots)		Goalie stats	J. P. Anderson (37 saves / 43 shots)

April 10	Mississauga St. Michael's Majors	3 – 1	Ottawa 67's	Hershey Centre	Recap
19:10 - pp - Casey Cizikas (4)		First period	No scoring
15:40 - Dustin Ekelman (4); 18:02 - pp - Casey Cizikas (5)		Second period	No scoring
No scoring		Third period	Tyler Toffoli (7) - 5:40
J. P. Anderson (32 saves / 33 shots)		Goalie stats	Petr Mrázek (26 saves / 29 shots)

April 12	Ottawa 67's	3 – 5	Mississauga St. Michael's Majors	Urbandale Centre	Recap
No scoring		First period	Jordan Mayer (3) - 9:16; Kelly Geoffrey (2) - 17:14
1:45 - Cody Lindsay (3); 5:36 - Thomas Nesbitt (5)		Second period	No scoring
16:39 - Ryan Martindale (4)		Third period	Gregg Sutch (3) - 2:13; Devante Smith-Pelly (6) - 8:41; Casey Cizikas (6) - 18:32
Petr Mrázek (29 saves / 34 shots)		Goalie stats	J. P. Anderson (16 saves / 19 shots)

Mississauga won series 4 – 3

==== Western conference ====
===== (1) Windsor Spitfires vs. (4) Plymouth Whalers =====
April 1	Windsor Spitfires	5 – 1	Plymouth Whalers	WFCU Centre	Recap
11:07 - Scott Timmins (2); 18:29 - Adam Henrique (3)		First period	No scoring
8:47 - pp - Ryan Ellis (1)		Second period	Ryan Hayes (5) - pp - 15:23
1:28 - pp - Taylor Hall (7); 19:33 - Taylor Hall (8)		Third period	No scoring
Philipp Grubauer (27 saves / 28 shots)		Goalie stats	Matt Hackett (35 saves / 40 shots)

April 3	Plymouth Whalers	3 – 5	Windsor Spitfires	Compuware Arena	Recap
Ryan Hayes (6) - 11:55		First period	11:45 - Dale Mitchell (3)
A.J. Jenks (3) - 2:52		Second period	3:47 - Eric Wellwood (2); 6:28 - pp - Taylor Hall (9)
A.J. Jenks (4) - 9:51		Third period	5:05 - Dale Mitchell (4); 19:04 - en - Adam Henrique (4)
Matt Hackett (51 saves / 55 shots)		Goalie stats	Philipp Grubauer (23 saves / 26 shots)

April 5	Windsor Spitfires	5 – 0	Plymouth Whalers	WFCU Centre	Recap
Dale Mitchell (5) - 1:13		First period	No scoring
Adam Henrique (5) - 7:25		Second period	No scoring
Eric Wellwood (3) - 5:51; Ryan Ellis (2) - pp - 11:54; Dale Mitchell (6) - pp - 12:32		Third period	No scoring
Philipp Grubauer (16 saves / 16 shots)		Goalie stats	Matt Hackett (31 saves / 36 shots); Scott Wedgewood (0 saves / 0 shots)

April 7	Plymouth Whalers	2 – 3	OT	Windsor Spitfires	Compuware Arena	Recap
1:52 - Ryan Hayes (7)		First period		No scoring
15:29 - Joe Gaynor (3)		Second period		No scoring
No scoring		Third period		Adam Henrique (6) - pp - 2:49; Greg Nemisz (1) - 19:21
No scoring		First overtime period		Scott Timmins (3) - 6:50
Scott Wedgewood (70 saves / 73 shots)		Goalie stats		Philipp Grubauer (19 saves / 21 shots)

Windsor won series 4 – 0

===== (2) London Knights vs. (3) Kitchener Rangers =====
April 1	London Knights	8 – 5	Kitchener Rangers	John Labatt Centre	Recap
0:10 - Stephen Sanza (1); 1:20 - Jared Knight (6); 9:09 - Daniel Erlich (6)		First period	Jeff Skinner (4) - pp - 8:22
12:22 - Nazem Kadri (5); 18:10 - Daniel Erlich (7)		Second period	Ryan Murphy - pp - 3:08; Chris MacKinnon (2) - 7:59
1:48 - Colin Martin (3); 2:13 - Chris DeSousa (2); 9:41 - Leigh Salters (3)		Third period	Michael Catenacci (3) - 2:41; Jeff Skinner (5) - 17:06
Michael Hutchinson (28 saves / 33 shots)		Goalie stats	Brandon Maxwell (25 saves / 33 shots)

April 2	Kitchener Rangers	5 – 2	London Knights	Kitchener Memorial Auditorium Complex	Recap
Gabriel Landeskog (2) - sh - 6:05		First period	No scoring
Gabriel Landeskog (3) - 3:19; Jeremy Morin (4) - 10:01		Second period	16:33 - pp - Nazem Kadri (6)
Jeff Skinner (6) - 15:58; Gabriel Landeskog (4) - en - 19:33		Third period	19:07 - pp - Daniel Erlich (8)
Brandon Maxwell (39 saves / 41 shots)		Goalie stats	Michael Hutchinson (28 saves / 32 shots)

April 5	London Knights	6 – 3	Kitchener Rangers	John Labatt Centre	Recap
Chris DeSousa (3) - pp - 3:29		First period	12:40 - Ryan Murphy (2); 18:23 - pp - Jeremy Morin (5)
Michael McDonald (1) - 2:43		Second period	No scoring
Michael McDonald (2) - 2:13; Chris DeSousa (4) - pp - 7:50; Leigh Salters (4) - pp - 11:16; Nazem Kadri (7) - ps - 17:45		Third period	4:34 - Jeff Skinner (7)
Michael Hutchinson (17 saves / 20 shots)		Goalie stats	Brandon Maxwell (37 saves / 43 shots)

April 7	Kitchener Rangers	8 – 7	OT	London Knights	Kitchener Memorial Auditorium Complex	Recap
10:12 - Michael Catenacci (4); 19:56 - Ryan Murphy		First period		Pieter Schinkelshoek (1) - 13:14; Tyler Brown (3) - 14:51
2:12 - Jeff Skinner (8); 12:45 - pp - John Moore		Second period		Nazem Kadri (8) - pp - 9:11
2:33 - pp - Jeff Skinner (9); 5:18 - Jeff Skinner (10); 12:26 - John Moore (2)		Third period		Nazem Kadri (9) - pp - 0:36; Jared Knight (7) - 3:35; Colin Martin (4) - 13:44; Stephen Sanza (2) - 14:23
2:09 - Jason Akeson (2)		First overtime period		No scoring
Brandon Maxwell (30 saves / 37 shots)		Goalie stats		Michael Hutchinson (28 saves / 35 shots); Michael Houser (4 saves / 5 shots)

April 8	London Knights	4 – 8	Kitchener Rangers	John Labatt Centre	Recap
7:40 - Jared Knight (8)		First period	Gabriel Landeskog (5) - pp - 5:26; Chris MacKinnon (3) - 8:36; Dan Kelly (3) - 9:06; Jason Akeson (3) - 16:42
0:51 - sh - Kalle Ekelund (2)		Second period	Jason Akeson (4) - 2:26; Chris MacKinnon (4) - pp - 12:45
4:11 - Seth Griffith (3); 9:28 - Justin Taylor (2)		Third period	Gabriel Landeskog (6) - pp - 6:34; Matthew Tipoff (1) - pp - 19:50
Michael Houser (5 saves / 8 shots); Michael Hutchinson (23 saves / 28 shots)		Goalie stats	Brandon Maxwell (25 saves / 29 shots)

April 10	Kitchener Rangers	3 – 5	London Knights	Kitchener Memorial Auditorium Complex	Recap
5:32 - Jeff Skinner (11)		First period	Steven Tarasuk (1) - 10:40; Jared Knight (9) - 17:20
No scoring		Second period	Justin Taylor (3) - pp - 4:40; Kalle Ekelund (3) - 5:37; Jared Knight (10) - 10:48
0:54 - pp - Jeff Skinner (12); 2:37 - pp - John Moore		Third period	No scoring
Brandon Maxwell (30 saves / 35 shots)		Goalie stats	Michael Hutchinson (40 saves / 43 shots)

April 12	London Knights	3 – 8	Kitchener Rangers	John Labatt Centre	Recap
9:39 - Chris DeSousa (5)		First period	No scoring
7:21 - Seth Griffith (4)		Second period	Julian Cimadamore (4) - sh - 0:48; Jeremy Morin (6) - pp - 3:12; Gabriel Landeskog (7) - sh - 3:51; Jason Akeson (5) - 6:25; Jeremy Morin (7) - 7:01
16:16 - pp - Daniel Erlich (9)		Third period	John Moore (4) - 0:41; Dan Kelly (4) - pp - 4:52; Jeremy Morin (8) - pp - 11:56
Michael Hutchinson (15 saves / 20 shots); Michael Houser (24 saves / 27 shots)		Goalie stats	Brandon Maxwell (20 saves / 23 shots)

Kitchener won series 4 – 3

=== Conference finals ===
==== Eastern conference ====
===== (1) Barrie Colts vs. (3) Mississauga St. Michael's Majors =====
April 14	Barrie Colts	3 – 0	Mississauga St. Michael's Majors	Barrie Molson Centre	Recap
2:53 - pp - Matt Kennedy (5)		First period	No scoring
No scoring		Second period	No scoring
4:59 - Matt Kennedy (6); 19:49 - en - Darren Archibald (4)		Third period	No scoring
Mavric Parks (29 saves / 29 shots)		Goalie stats	J.P. Anderson (31 saves / 33 shots)

April 16	Mississauga St. Michael's Majors	5 – 2	Barrie Colts	Hershey Centre	Recap
Riley Brace (3) - pp - 6:57; Devante Smith-Pelly (7) - pp - 10:15; Dustin Ekelman (5) - sh - 17:23		First period	No scoring
No scoring		Second period	T. J. Brodie (1) - 10:13; Bryan Cameron (9) - 15:20
3:35 - Kelly Geoffrey (3); 11:18 - Jordan Mayer (4)		Third period	No scoring
J.P. Anderson (33 saves / 35 shots)		Goalie stats	Mavric Parks (22 saves / 27 shots)

April 17	Barrie Colts	3 – 1	Mississauga St. Michael's Majors	Barrie Molson Centre	Recap
No scoring		First period	2:29 - T.J. Battani (3)
Luke Pither (6) - 0:32; Luke Pither (7) - 16:39		Second period	No scoring
Bryan Cameron (10) - pp - 0:11		Third period	No scoring
Mavric Parks (34 saves / 35 shots)		Goalie stats	J.P. Anderson (55 saves / 58 shots)

April 19	Mississauga St. Michael's Majors	1 – 3	Barrie Colts	Hershey Centre	Recap
No scoring		First period	Bryan Cameron (11) - 15:08; Stefan Della Rovere (5) - 18:25
15:13 - Gregg Sutch (4)		Second period	Matt Kennedy (7) - pp - 16:36
No scoring		Third period	No scoring
J.P. Anderson (34 saves / 37 shots)		Goalie stats	Mavric Parks (23 saves / 24 shots)

April 21	Barrie Colts	4 – 2	Mississauga St. Michael's Majors	Barrie Molson Centre	Recap
11:31 - Stefan Della Rovere (6); 11:45 - Alex Hutchings (2); 17:19 - Stefan Della Rovere (7)		First period	No scoring
No scoring		Second period	Devante Smith-Pelly (8) - pp - 12:19; Casey Cizikas (7) - 19:05
4:26 - Luke Pither (8)		Third period	No scoring
Mavric Parks (20 saves / 22 shots)		Goalie stats	J.P. Anderson (14 saves / 17 shots); Chris Carrozzi (23 saves / 24 shots)

Barrie won series 4 – 1

==== Western conference ====
===== (1) Windsor Spitfires vs. (3) Kitchener Rangers =====
April 15	Windsor Spitfires	6 – 7	OT	Kitchener Rangers	WFCU Centre	Recap
7:18 - Marc Cantin (2); 10:30 - Kenny Ryan (2); 14:11 - Cam Fowler (1)		First period		Chris MacKinnon (5) - 2:13; Jeff Skinner (13) - pp - 15:59; Jeff Skinner (14) - 19:10
1:54 - Kenny Ryan (3); 17:22 - Zack Kassian (3); 19:52 - Justin Shugg (3)		Second period		Ryan Murphy (4) - pp - 5:15; Ryan Murphy (5) - 10:02; Jason Akeson (6) - 18:33
No scoring		Third period		No scoring
No scoring		First overtime period		Jonathan Jasper (1) - 9:49
Philipp Grubauer (28 saves / 35 shots)		Goalie stats		Brandon Maxwell (59 saves / 65 shots)

April 17	Kitchener Rangers	5 – 2	Windsor Spitfires	Kitchener Memorial Auditorium Complex	Recap
Jeff Skinner (15) - pp - 12:22		First period	No scoring
Chris MacKinnon (6) - 0:34; Jason Akeson (7) - pp - 2:58		Second period	13:22 - Adam Henrique (7)
Andrew Crescenzi (1) - 11:52; Jeff Skinner (16) - pp - 17:49		Third period	1:24 - Taylor Hall (10)
Brandon Maxwell (48 saves / 50 shots)		Goalie stats	Philipp Grubauer (36 saves / 41 shots)

April 18	Windsor Spitfires	3 – 5	Kitchener Rangers	WFCU Centre	Recap
No scoring		First period	1:02 - Jeremy Morin (9)
Zack Kassian (4) - 5:30; Adam Henrique (8) - 16:29		Second period	16:44 - Jeremy Morin (10); 18:02 - Jeremy Morin (11)
Adam Henrique (9) - pp - 0:29		Third period	18:27 - Gabriel Landeskog (8); 19:16 - en - Julian Cimadamore (5)
Troy Passingham (24 saves / 28 shots)		Goalie stats	Brandon Maxwell (42 saves / 45 shots)

April 20	Kitchener Rangers	5 – 7	Windsor Spitfires	Kitchener Memorial Auditorium Complex	Recap
No scoring		First period	Scott Timmins (4) - 3:31; Zack Kassian (5) - pp - 10:35; Greg Nemisz (2) - 18:43
0:23 - pp - Jeff Skinner (17)		Second period	Zack Kassian (6) - pp - 18:13
2:05 - Matthew Tipoff (2); 11:20 - pp - Jeff Skinner (18); 11:40 - Jason Akeson (8); 17:08 - Chris MacKinnon (7)		Third period	Adam Henrique (10) - pp - 14:44; Taylor Hall (11) - 18:02; Adam Henrique (11) - sh - en - 19:46
Brandon Maxwell (35 saves / 41 shots)		Goalie stats	Philipp Grubauer (24 saves / 29 shots)

April 22	Windsor Spitfires	3 – 0	Kitchener Rangers	WFCU Centre	Recap
18:41 - Taylor Hall (12)		First period	No scoring
4:12 - Adam Henrique (12)		Second period	No scoring
18:30 - en - Adam Henrique (13)		Third period	No scoring
Philipp Grubauer (28 saves / 28 shots)		Goalie stats	Brandon Maxwell (42 saves / 44 shots)

April 23	Kitchener Rangers	4 – 6	Windsor Spitfires	Kitchener Memorial Auditorium Complex	Recap
1:01 - Jeremy Morin (12); 8:00 - Jeff Skinner (19)		First period	Taylor Hall (13) - 10:53; Adam Henrique (14) - 13:28; Scott Timmins (5) - 19:45
No scoring		Second period	Scott Timmins (6) - 1:40; Scott Timmins (7) - 9:37; Taylor Hall (14) - 10:24
1:02 - Tyler Randell (1); 3:52 - Jeff Skinner (20)		Third period	No scoring
Brandon Maxwell (25 saves / 31 shots); Mike Morrison (15 saves / 15 shots)		Goalie stats	Philipp Grubauer (38 saves / 42 shots)

April 25	Windsor Spitfires	4 – 1	Kitchener Rangers	WFCU Centre	Recap
14:10 - Adam Henrique (15)		First period	No scoring
8:18 - Eric Wellwood (4)		Second period	Julian Cimadamore (6) - sh - 19:11
2:13 - pp - Scott Timmins (8); 5:37 - Justin Shugg (4)		Third period	No scoring
Philipp Grubauer (26 saves / 27 shots)		Goalie stats	Brandon Maxwell (42 saves / 46 shots)

Windsor won series 4 – 3

=== J. Ross Robertson Cup ===
==== (E1) Barrie Colts vs. (W1) Windsor Spitfires ====
April 27	Barrie Colts	3 – 4	OT	Windsor Spitfires	Barrie Molson Centre	Recap
13:11 - Matt Kennedy (8); 16:10 - Kyle Clifford (3)		First period		Adam Henrique (16) - 16:43; Ryan Ellis (3) - 19:27
10:36 - Darren Archibald (5)		Second period		No scoring
No scoring		Third period		Mark Cundari (2) - 16:44
No scoring		First overtime period		Taylor Hall (15) - pp - 2:35
Mavric Parks (44 saves / 48 shots)		Goalie stats		Philipp Grubauer (29 saves / 32 shots)

April 29	Barrie Colts	4 – 5	Windsor Spitfires	Barrie Molson Centre	Recap
19:27 - pp - Alexander Burmistrov (8)		First period	Mark Cundari (3) - sh - 7:41
11:50 - Kyle Clifford (4)		Second period	Mark Cundari (4) - 4:32; Zack Kassian (7) - 10:46
13:09 - Taylor Carnevale (3); 15:39 - Kyle Clifford (5)		Third period	Scott Timmins (9) - 7:48; Dale Mitchell (7) - 14:10
Mavric Parks (17 saves / 22 shots)		Goalie stats	Philipp Grubauer (33 saves / 37 shots)

May 2	Windsor Spitfires	5 – 2	Barrie Colts	WFCU Centre	Recap
No scoring		First period	No scoring
3:18 - pp - Justin Shugg (5); 9:30 - Adam Henrique (17); 12:49 - sh - Adam Henrique (18); 17:36 - Scott Timmins (10)		Second period	Zac Rinaldo (2) - 14:00; Stefan Della Rovere (8) - 16:07
15:15 - Adam Henrique (19)		Third period	No scoring
Philipp Grubauer (42 saves / 44 shots); Troy Passingham (0 saves / 0 shots)		Goalie stats	Peter Di Salvo (25 saves / 30 shots)

May 4	Windsor Spitfires	6 – 2	Barrie Colts	WFCU Centre	Recap
19:34 - pp - Cam Fowler (2)		First period	Luke Pither (9) - pp - 6:33
0:13 - pp - Taylor Hall (16); 10:28 - pp - Cam Fowler (3)		Second period	Matt Kennedy (9) - 6:07
9:27 - Scott Timmins (11); 18:20 - en - Taylor Hall (17)		Third period	No scoring
Philipp Grubauer (33 saves / 35 shots)		Goalie stats	Peter Di Salvo (33 saves / 38 shots)

Windsor won series 4 – 0

=== J. Ross Robertson Cup Champions Roster ===
2009-10 Windsor Spitfires
Goaltenders: (Canada) 31 – Troy Passingham; (Germany) 33 – Philipp Grubauer	Defencemen: (Canada) 6 – Ryan Ellis; (United States) 8 – Craig Duininck; (Canada) 11 – Marc Cantin; (United States) 24 – Cam Fowler; (United States) 27 – Saverio Posa; (Canada) 51 – Mark Cundari; (Canada) 55 – Harry Young – C	Wingers: (Canada) 4 – Taylor Hall; (Canada) 7 – Adam Wallace; (Canada) 19 – Zack Kassian; (United States) 26 – Kenny Ryan; (Canada) 29 – Derek Lanoue; (Canada) 44 – Justin Shugg; (Canada) 64 – Greg Nemisz – A; (Canada) 67 – Eric Wellwood – A; (Canada) 70 – James Woodcroft; (Canada) 71 – Dale Mitchell	Centres: (Canada) 10 – Stephen Johnston; (Canada) 14 – Adam Henrique – A; (Canada) 77 – Scott Timmins; Coach: (Canada) Bob Boughner; General Manager: (Canada) Warren Rychel

=== Playoff scoring leaders ===
Note: GP = Games played; G = Goals; A = Assists; Pts = Points; PIM = Penalty minutes

Player	Team	GP	G	A	Pts	PIM
Taylor Hall	Windsor Spitfires	19	17	18	35	32
Jeff Skinner	Kitchener Rangers	20	20	13	33	14
Ryan Ellis	Windsor Spitfires	19	3	30	33	14
Nazem Kadri	London Knights	12	9	18	27	26
Chris MacKinnon	Kitchener Rangers	20	7	20	27	33
Adam Henrique	Windsor Spitfires	19	20	5	25	12
Gabriel Landeskog	Kitchener Rangers	20	8	15	23	18
Scott Timmins	Windsor Spitfires	19	11	11	22	18
Jeremy Morin	Kitchener Rangers	20	12	9	21	32
Daniel Erlich	London Knights	12	9	12	21	15

=== Playoff leading goaltenders ===
Note: GP = Games played; Mins = Minutes played; W = Wins; L = Losses; GA = Goals Allowed; SO = Shutouts; SV& = Save percentage; GAA = Goals against average

Player	Team	GP	Mins	W	L	GA	SO	Sv%	GAA
Chris Carrozzi	Mississauga St. Michael's Majors	8	448	5	2	16	1	0.928	2.14
Mavric Parks	Barrie Colts	10	602	7	2	23	1	0.926	2.29
Edward Pasquale	Saginaw Spirit	6	361	2	4	14	0	0.941	2.33
Petr Mrázek	Ottawa 67's	8	451	4	4	18	0	0.928	2.39
Philipp Grubauer	Windsor Spitfires	18	1094	16	2	49	2	0.909	2.69

== All-Star Classic ==
The OHL All-Star Classic was played on February 3, 2010, at the K-Rock Centre in Kingston, Ontario. The game was televised on Rogers Sportsnet. The Eastern Conference All-Stars defeated the Western Conference All-Stars 17–11. Captains of the All-Star games were Ryan Ellis for the Western Conference and Alex Pietrangelo for the Eastern Conference. Andrew Agozzino of the Niagara IceDogs won the player of the game award as he scored an All-Star Game record four goals and added one assist. The skills competition was held the night before on February 2, with the Western Conference winning. Honorary captains for the event were former Toronto Marlboros player Steve Thomas representing the Eastern Conference and former Windsor Spitfires player Adam Graves representing the Eastern Conference.

== All-Star teams ==
The OHL All-Star Teams were selected by the OHL's general managers.

=== First team ===
- Tyler Seguin, Centre, Plymouth Whalers
- Taylor Hall, Left Wing, Windsor Spitfires
- Bryan Cameron, Right wing, Barrie Colts
- Jake Muzzin, Defence, Sault Ste. Marie Greyhounds
- Nick Crawford, Defence, Barrie Colts
- Chris Carrozzi, Goalie, Mississauga St. Michael's Majors
- Dale Hunter, Coach, London Knights

=== Second team ===
- Nazem Kadri, Centre, London Knights
- Jeremy Morin, Left Wing, Kitchener Rangers
- Taylor Beck, Right wing, Guelph Storm
- Cameron Gaunce, Defence, Mississauga St. Michael's Majors
- Ryan Ellis, Defence, Windsor Spitfires
- Matt Hackett, Goalie, Plymouth Whalers
- Dave Cameron, Coach, Mississauga St. Michael's Majors

=== Third team ===
- Luke Pither, Centre, Barrie Colts
- Chris MacKinnon, Left Wing, Kitchener Rangers
- Greg Nemisz, Right wing, Windsor Spitfires
- Alex Pietrangelo, Defence, Barrie Colts
- Shawn Lalonde, Defence, Belleville Bulls
- Patrick Killeen, Goalie, Brampton Battalion
- Marty Williamson, Coach, Barrie Colts

== Awards ==
J. Ross Robertson Cup:	Windsor Spitfires
Hamilton Spectator Trophy:	Barrie Colts
Bobby Orr Trophy:	Barrie Colts
Wayne Gretzky Trophy:	Windsor Spitfires
Emms Trophy:	Barrie Colts
Leyden Trophy:	Ottawa 67's
Holody Trophy:	London Knights
Bumbacco Trophy:	Windsor Spitfires
Red Tilson Trophy:	Tyler Seguin, Plymouth Whalers
Eddie Powers Memorial Trophy:	Tyler Seguin, Plymouth Whalers & Taylor Hall, Windsor Spitfires
Matt Leyden Trophy:	Dale Hunter, London Knights
Jim Mahon Memorial Trophy:	Taylor Beck, Guelph Storm
Max Kaminsky Trophy:	Jake Muzzin, Sault Ste. Marie Greyhounds
OHL Goaltender of the Year:	Chris Carrozzi, Mississauga St. Michael's Majors
Jack Ferguson Award:	Alex Galchenyuk, Sarnia Sting
Dave Pinkney Trophy:	Chris Carrozzi & J. P. Anderson, Mississauga St. Michael's Majors
OHL Executive of the Year:	Rick Gaetz, Guelph Storm
Bill Long Award:	Peter Karmanos Jr, Plymouth Whalers
Emms Family Award:	Matt Puempel, Peterborough Petes
F. W. "Dinty" Moore Trophy:	Petr Mrazek, Ottawa 67's
Dan Snyder Memorial Trophy:	Ryan Hayes, Plymouth Whalers
William Hanley Trophy:	Ryan Spooner, Peterborough Petes
Leo Lalonde Memorial Trophy:	Bryan Cameron, Barrie Colts
Bobby Smith Trophy:	Erik Gudbranson, Kingston Frontenacs
Roger Neilson Memorial Award:	Derek Lanoue, Windsor Spitfires
Ivan Tennant Memorial Award:	Dougie Hamilton, Niagara IceDogs
Mickey Renaud Captain's Trophy:	John Kurtz, Sudbury Wolves
Tim Adams Memorial Trophy:	Sean Monahan, Mississauga Rebels
Wayne Gretzky 99 Award:	Adam Henrique, Windsor Spitfires

== 2010 OHL Priority Selection ==
On May 1, 2010, the OHL conducted the 2010 Ontario Hockey League Priority Selection. The Sarnia Sting held the first overall pick in the draft, and selected Alex Galchenyuk from the Chicago Young Americans. Galchenyuk was awarded the Jack Ferguson Award, awarded to the top pick in the draft.

Below are the players who were selected in the first round of the 2010 Ontario Hockey League Priority Selection.

#	Player	Nationality	OHL team	Hometown	Minor team
1	Alex Galchenyuk (C)	United States	Sarnia Sting	Milwaukee, Wisconsin	Chicago Young Americans
2	Brendan Gaunce (C)	Canada	Belleville Bulls	Markham, Ontario	Markham Waxers
3	Scott Laughton (C)	Canada	Oshawa Generals	Oakville, Ontario	Toronto Marlboros
4	Jarrod Maidens (C/LW)	Canada	Owen Sound Attack	Ridgeway, Ontario	Hamilton Jr. Bulldogs
5	Mathew Campagna (C)	Canada	Sudbury Wolves	Mississauga, Ontario	Toronto Nationals
6	Jesse Graham (D)	Canada	Niagara IceDogs	Scarborough, Ontario	Toronto Nationals
7	Slater Koekkoek (D)	Canada	Peterborough Petes	Manotick, Ontario	Notre Dame Hounds
8	Luke Mercer (D)	Canada	Niagara IceDogs	Brampton, Ontario	Toronto Nationals
9	Marcus McIvor (D)	Canada	Brampton Battalion	Whitby, Ontario	Whitby Wildcats
10	Alex Gudbranson (D)	Canada	Kingston Frontenacs	Ottawa, Ontario	Ottawa Jr. 67's
11	Chris Marchese (RW)	Canada	Erie Otters	Vaughan, Ontario	Toronto Marlboros
12	Matthew Finn (D)	Canada	Guelph Storm	Etobicoke, Ontario	Toronto Marlboros
13	Justin Kea (C)	Canada	Saginaw Spirit	Woodville, Ontario	Central Ontario Wolves
14	Gianluca Curcuruto (D)	Canada	Sault Ste. Marie Greyhounds	Richmond Hill, Ontario	Mississauga Reps
15	Max Iafrate (D)	United States	Plymouth Whalers	Livonia, Michigan	Detroit Belle Tire 16U
16	Sean Monahan (C)	Canada	Ottawa 67's	Brampton, Ontario	Mississauga Reps
17	Nick Ebert (D)	United States	Mississauga St. Michael's Majors	Livingston, New Jersey	Waterloo Black Hawks
18	Matia Marcantuoni (C)	Canada	Kitchener Rangers	Woodbridge, Ontario	Toronto Marlboros
19	Chris Tierney (C)	Canada	London Knights	Keswick, Ontario	York-Simcoe Express
20	Grant Webermin (D)	United States	Windsor Spitfires	Novi, Michigan	Detroit Honeybaked
21	Kerby Rychel (LW)	Canada	Barrie Colts	Tecumseh, Ontario	Detroit Belle Tire 16U

== 2010 NHL entry draft ==
On June 25–26, 2010, the National Hockey League conducted the 2010 NHL entry draft held at the Staples Center in Los Angeles, California. In total, 42 players from the Ontario Hockey League were selected in the draft. Taylor Hall of the Windsor Spitfires was the first player from the OHL to be selected, as he was taken with the first overall pick by the Edmonton Oilers.

Below are the players selected from OHL teams at the NHL Entry Draft.

Round	#	Player	Nationality	NHL team	Hometown	OHL team
1	1	Taylor Hall (LW)	Canada	Edmonton Oilers	Kingston, Ontario	Windsor Spitfires
1	2	Tyler Seguin (C)	Canada	Boston Bruins	Brampton, Ontario	Plymouth Whalers
1	3	Erik Gudbranson (D)	Canada	Florida Panthers	Orleans, Ontario	Kingston Frontenacs
1	7	Jeff Skinner (C)	Canada	Carolina Hurricanes	Markham, Ontario	Kitchener Rangers
1	8	Alexander Burmistrov (C)	Russia	Atlanta Thrashers	Kazan, Russia	Barrie Colts
1	12	Cam Fowler (D)	United States	Anaheim Ducks	Farmington Hills, Michigan	Windsor Spitfires
1	17	Joey Hishon (C)	Canada	Colorado Avalanche	Stratford, Ontario	Owen Sound Attack
1	18	Austin Watson (C)	United States	Nashville Predators	Ann Arbor, Michigan	Peterborough Petes
1	27	Mark Visentin (G)	Canada	Phoenix Coyotes	Waterdown, Ontario	Niagara IceDogs
2	32	Jared Knight (RW)	United States	Boston Bruins	Battle Creek, Michigan	London Knights
2	33	John McFarland (C)	Canada	Florida Panthers	Richmond Hill, Ontario	Sudbury Wolves
2	34	Dalton Smith (LW)	Canada	Columbus Blue Jackets	Oshawa, Ontario	Ottawa 67's
2	40	Christian Thomas (RW)	Canada	New York Rangers	Toronto, Ontario	Oshawa Generals
2	42	Devante Smith-Pelly (LW)	Canada	Anaheim Ducks	Scarborough, Ontario	Mississauga St. Michael's Majors
2	45	Ryan Spooner (C)	Canada	Boston Bruins	Kanata, Ontario	Peterborough Petes
2	47	Tyler Toffoli (RW)	Canada	Los Angeles Kings	Scarborough, Ontario	Ottawa 67's
2	52	Phil Lane (RW)	United States	Phoenix Coyotes	Rochester, New York	Brampton Battalion
3	61	Ryan Martindale (C)	Canada	Edmonton Oilers	Brooklin, Ontario	Ottawa 67's
3	62	Greg McKegg (C)	Canada	Toronto Maple Leafs	St. Thomas, Ontario	Erie Otters
3	63	Brock Beukeboom (D)	Canada	Tampa Bay Lightning	Uxbridge, Ontario	Sault Ste. Marie Greyhounds
3	84	Scott Wedgewood (G)	Canada	New Jersey Devils	Brampton, Ontario	Plymouth Whalers
3	85	Austin Levi (D)	United States	Carolina Hurricanes	Aurora, Colorado	Plymouth Whalers
4	94	Brandon Archibald (D)	United States	Columbus Blue Jackets	Port Huron, Michigan	Sault Ste. Marie Greyhounds
4	95	Stephen Silas (D)	Canada	Colorado Avalanche	Georgetown, Ontario	Belleville Bulls
4	96	Geoffrey Schemitsch (D)	Canada	Tampa Bay Lightning	Thornhill, Ontario	Owen Sound Attack
4	98	Steven Shipley (C)	Canada	Buffalo Sabres	Ilderton, Ontario	Owen Sound Attack
4	100	Andrew Yogan (C)	United States	New York Rangers	Boca Raton, Florida	Erie Otters
4	101	Ivan Telegin (C)	Russia	Atlanta Thrashers	Novokuznetsk, Russia	Saginaw Spirit
4	105	Justin Shugg (RW)	Canada	Carolina Hurricanes	Niagara Falls, Ontario	Windsor Spitfires
4	112	Philipp Grubauer (G)	Germany	Washington Capitals	Rosenheim, Germany	Windsor Spitfires
4	120	Rob Flick (LW)	Canada	Chicago Blackhawks	London, Ontario	Mississauga St. Michael's Majors
5	125	Tony DeHart (D)	United States	New York Islanders	Ballwin, Missouri	Oshawa Generals
5	129	Freddie Hamilton (LW)	Canada	San Jose Sharks	Toronto, Ontario	Niagara IceDogs
5	130	Jason Wilson (LW)	Canada	New York Rangers	Richmond Hill, Ontario	Owen Sound Attack
5	141	Petr Mrazek (G)	Czech Republic	Detroit Red Wings	Ostrava, Czech Republic	Ottawa 67's
5	143	Gregg Sutch (RW)	Canada	Buffalo Sabres	Newmarket, Ontario	Mississauga St. Michael's Majors
5	144	Sam Carrick (C)	Canada	Toronto Maple Leafs	Stouffville, Ontario	Brampton Battalion
6	152	Joe Rogalski (D)	United States	Pittsburgh Penguins	Lancaster, New York	Sarnia Sting
6	153	Corey Durocher (LW)	Canada	Florida Panthers	Ottawa, Ontario	Kingston Frontenacs
6	154	Dalton Prout (D)	Canada	Columbus Blue Jackets	Kingsville, Ontario	Barrie Colts
6	170	Reid McNeill (D)	Canada	Pittsburgh Penguins	London, Ontario	London Knights
6	172	Alex Friesen (C)	Canada	Vancouver Canucks	Niagara Falls, Ontario	Niagara IceDogs

== 2010 CHL Import Draft ==
On June 28, 2010, the Canadian Hockey League conducted the 2010 CHL Import Draft, in which teams in all three CHL leagues participate in. The Sarnia Sting held the first pick in the draft by a team in the OHL, and selected Nail Yakupov from Russia with their selection.

Below are the players who were selected in the first round by Ontario Hockey League teams in the 2010 CHL Import Draft.

#	Player	Nationality	OHL team	Hometown	Minor team
2	Nail Yakupov (RW)	Russia	Sarnia Sting	Nizhnekamsk, Russia	Neftekamsk Toros - 2
5	Tobias Rieder (LW)	Germany	Kitchener Rangers	Landshut, Germany	Landshut EV Jr.
8	Nicklas Jensen (RW)	Denmark	Oshawa Generals	Herning, Denmark	Herning Blue Fox
11	Petr Beranek (RW)	Czech Republic	Barrie Colts	Brno, Czech Republic	Tappara B
14	Mika Partanen (LW)	Finland	Mississauga St. Michael's Majors	Helsinki, Finland	HIFK Helsinki
17	Maxim Kitsyn (LW)	Russia	Mississauga St. Michael's Majors	Novokuznetsk, Russia	Magnitogorsk Metallurg
20	Vladislav Namestnikov (C)	Russia	London Knights	Nizhny Novgorod, Russia	Voskresensk Khimik
23	Alexander Khokhlachev (C)	Russia	Windsor Spitfires	Moscow, Russia	Moscow Spartak
26	Jonathan Johansson (C)	Sweden	Brampton Battalion	Gothenburg, Sweden	Vastra Frolunda HC Jr.
29	Timofey Tankeev (C)	Russia	Erie Otters	Moscow, Russia	St. Louis Jr. Blues
32	Andrey Pedan (D)	Russia	Guelph Storm	Kaunas, Lithuania	Moscow Dynamo U17
35	Lino Martschini (RW)	Switzerland	Peterborough Petes	Lucerne, Switzerland	Zug EV Jr.
38	Yegor Omelyanenko (LW)	Russia	Sault Ste. Marie Greyhounds	Khabarovsk, Russia	Moscow Spartak U17
41	Rickard Rakell (LW)	Sweden	Plymouth Whalers	Stockholm, Sweden	AIK J18A
44	Robert Farmer (LW)	United Kingdom	Ottawa 67's	Nottingham, United Kingdom	Sheffield Steelers
47	Andrei Kuchin (LW)	Russia	Sudbury Wolves	Elektrougli, Russia	Chicago Steel
50	Dario Trutmann (D)	Switzerland	Plymouth Whalers	Kussnacht, Switzerland	Zug EV Jr.
53	Igor Bobkov (G)	Russia	London Knights	Surgut, Russia	Magnitogorsk Stalnye Lisy
56	Michal Cajkovsky (D)	Slovakia	Kingston Frontenacs	Sastin-Straze, Slovakia	Bratislava Slovan Jr.
59	Richards Berzins (D)	Latvia	Owen Sound Attack	Riga, Latvia	HS Prizma/Pardaugava 92

== See also ==
- 2010 Memorial Cup
- List of OHL seasons
- 2009–10 QMJHL season
- 2009–10 WHL season
- 2009 NHL entry draft
- List of OHA Junior A standings
- 2009 in ice hockey
- 2010 in ice hockey

Preceded by 2008–09 OHL season	OHL seasons	Succeeded by 2010–11 OHL season
