= J. P. Anderson =

Canadian ice hockey player

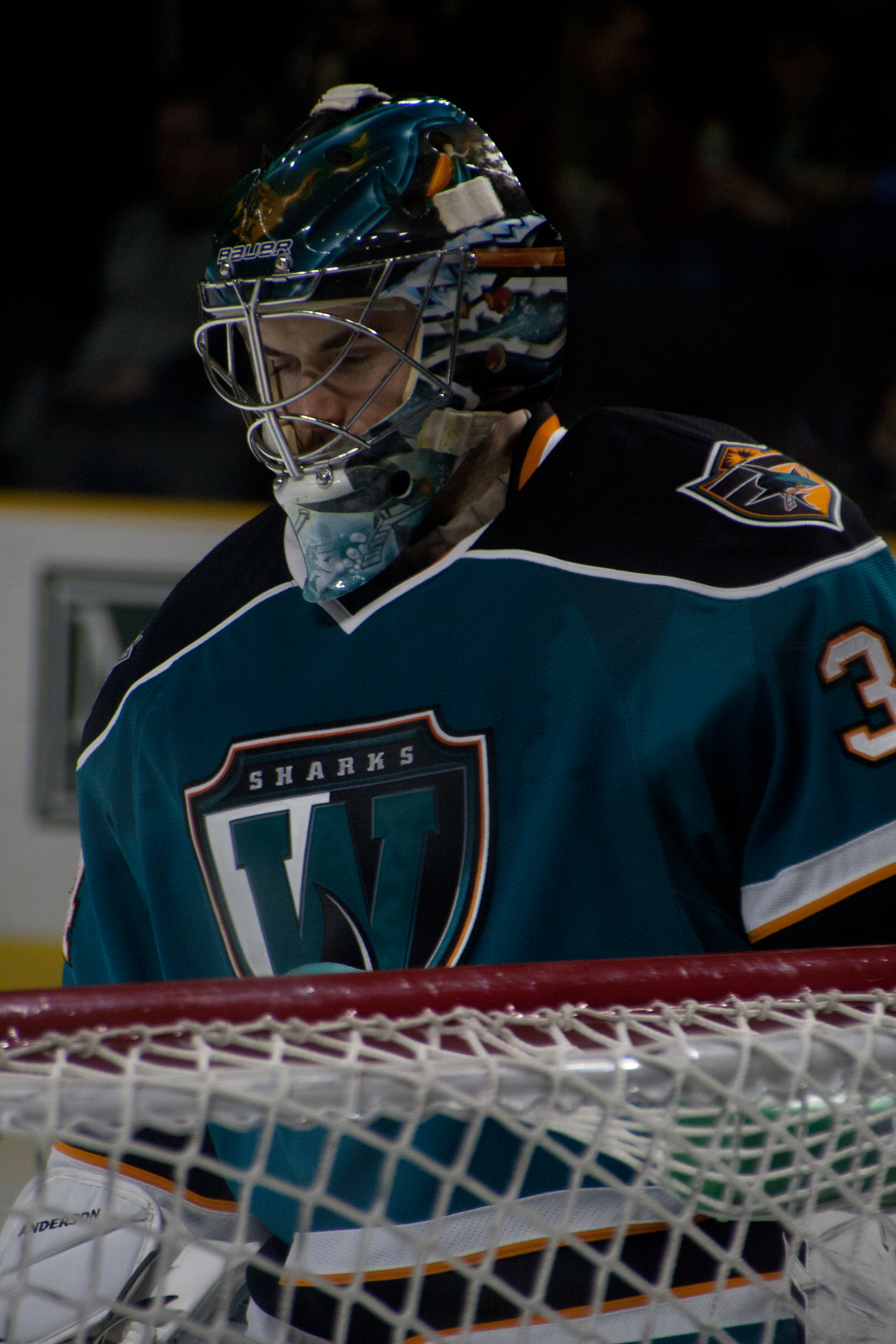
- Anderson with the Worcester Sharks in 2015
- Born: April 27, 1992 (age 34) Toronto, Ontario, Canada
- Height: 5 ft 11 in (180 cm)
- Weight: 185 lb (84 kg; 13 st 3 lb)
- Position: Goaltender
- Caught: Right
- Played for: Worcester Sharks; Albany Devils
- NHL draft: Undrafted
- Playing career: 2013–2017

Jon-Paul "J. P." Anderson (born April 27, 1992) is a Canadian former professional ice hockey goaltender. He most recently played for the Toledo Walleye of the ECHL.

Anderson played in the Ontario Hockey League (OHL) and was a standout with the Mississauga St. Michael's Majors and Sarnia Sting. Approaching his third season with the Majors in 2010–11, Anderson was signed as an undrafted free agent by the San Jose Sharks after a strong performance in the 2010 Young Stars Tournament on September 21, 2010.

Anderson holds the OHL record for the most wins by a goaltender (126).

== Career statistics ==
=== Regular season and playoffs ===
			Regular season									Playoffs
Season	Team	League	GP	W	L	T/OT	MIN	GA	SO	GAA	SV%	GP	W	L	MIN	GA	SO	GAA	SV%
2007–08	St. Michael's Buzzers	OPJHL	1	1	0	0	60	3	0	3.00	.893	—	—	—	—	—	—	—	—
2008–09	Mississauga St. Michael's Majors	OHL	26	12	12	0	1409	69	0	2.94	.904	11	6	4	697	29	0	2.50	.928
2009–10	Mississauga St. Michael's Majors	OHL	36	23	10	1	2028	88	2	2.60	.899	10	4	5	519	24	1	2.78	.978
2010–11	Mississauga St. Michael's Majors	OHL	51	38	10	1	2897	114	6	2.36	.911	20	15	2	1223	43	4	2.11	.920
2011–12	Mississauga St. Michael's Majors	OHL	31	15	11	4	1855	94	0	3.04	.910	—	—	—	—	—	—	—	—
2011–12	Sarnia Sting	OHL	26	12	12	2	1473	74	3	3.01	.905	4	2	2	262	17	0	3.90	.897
2012–13	Sarnia Sting	OHL	53	26	21	5	3031	167	1	3.31	.905	4	0	4	239	24	0	6.02	.865
2013–14	San Francisco Bulls	ECHL	14	1	7	2	672	39	0	3.48	.892	—	—	—	—	—	—	—	—
2013–14	Ontario Reign	ECHL	7	3	2	2	425	18	0	2.54	.917	2	0	2	118	7	0	3.55	.881
2014–15	Worcester Sharks	AHL	16	6	8	1	884	40	1	2.71	.900	—	—	—	—	—	—	—	—
2014–15	Allen Americans	ECHL	10	3	3	2	485	27	0	3.34	.878	—	—	—	—	—	—	—	—
2015–16	Wheeling Nailers	ECHL	4	2	1	1	190	7	0	2.21	.917	—	—	—	—	—	—	—	—
2016–17	Wheeling Nailers	ECHL	6	4	1	1	361	13	1	2.16	.927	—	—	—	—	—	—	—	—
2016–17	Adirondack Thunder	ECHL	24	15	3	3	1292	55	1	2.55	.915	6	2	4	360	15	0	2.51	.907
2016–17	Albany Devils	AHL	1	0	1	0	59	4	0	4.07	.857	—	—	—	—	—	—	—	—
2017–18	Toledo Walleye	ECHL	1	0	1	0	58	5	0	5.15	.815	—	—	—	—	—	—	—	—
AHL totals			17	6	9	1	943	44	1	2.80	.897	—	—	—	—	—	—	—	—

=== International ===
Year	Team	Event	Result	GP	W	L	T	MIN	GA	SO	GAA	SV%
2009	Canada Ontario	U-17	1st place, gold medalist(s)	5	5	0	0	300	11	0	2.31	.935
Junior totals				5	5	0	0	300	11	0	2.31	.935

== Awards and honours ==
Award	Year
Juniors
F. W. "Dinty" Moore Trophy - Rookie Goalie with Best GAA	2008–09
OHL First All-Rookie Team	2008–09
Dave Pinkney Trophy - Top Team Goaltending (Shared with Chris Carrozzi)	2009–10
CHL Goaltender of the Week (Nov. 7)	2010–11
CHL Goaltender of the Week (Jan. 30)	2010–11
CHL Playoff Goaltender of the Week (Mar. 27)	2010–11
Dave Pinkney Trophy	2010–11
OHL Second All-Star Team	2010–11
CHL Goaltender of the Week (Dec. 9)	2012–13
International
Invited to take part in Canada's National Junior Team selection camp	2011
World U-17 Hockey Challenge Gold Medal	2009
World U-17 Hockey Challenge Tournament All-Star Team	2009
