= Dave Pinkney Trophy =

- Sport: Ice hockey
- Awarded for: Goaltenders with lowest team GAA

History
- First award: 1949
- Most recent: Ryder Fetterolf & Jaeden Nelson (Ottawa 67's)

The Dave Pinkney Trophy is awarded to the goaltenders of the Ontario Hockey League team that has the lowest goals against average. It has been awarded annually since 1949.

== Winners ==
List of winners of the Dave Pinkney Trophy.

Season	Winner(s)	Team
1948–49	Gilles Mayer	Barrie Flyers
1949–50	Don Lockhart	Toronto Marlboros
1950–51	Don Lockhart	Toronto Marlboros
1950–51	Lorne Howes	Barrie Flyers
1951–52	Don Head	Toronto Marlboros
1952–53	John Henderson	Toronto Marlboros
1953–54	Dennis Riggin	Hamilton Tiger Cubs
1954–55	John Albani	Toronto Marlboros
1955–56	Jim Crocket	Toronto Marlboros
1956–57	Len Broderick	Toronto Marlboros
1957–58	Len Broderick	Toronto Marlboros
1958–59	Jacques Caron	Peterborough TPT Petes
1959–60	Gerry Cheevers	Toronto St. Michael's Majors
1960–61	Bud Blom	Hamilton Red Wings
1961–62	George Holmes	Montreal Junior Canadiens
1962–63	Chuck Goddard	Peterborough Petes
1963–64	Bernie Parent	Niagara Falls Flyers
1964–65	Bernie Parent	Niagara Falls Flyers
1965–66	Ted Ouimet	Montreal Junior Canadiens
1966–67	Peter McDuffe	St. Catharines Black Hawks
1967–68	Jim Rutherford & Gerry Gray	Hamilton Red Wings
1968–69	Wayne Wood & Ted Tucker	Montreal Junior Canadiens
1969–70	John Garrett	Peterborough Petes
1970–71	John Garrett	Peterborough Petes
1971–72	Michel Larocque	Ottawa 67's
1972–73	Mike Palmateer	Toronto Marlboros
1973–74	Don Edwards	Kitchener Rangers
1974–75	Greg Millen	Peterborough Petes
1975–76	Jim Bedard	Sudbury Wolves
1976–77	Pat Riggin	London Knights
1977–78	Al Jensen	Hamilton Fincups
1978–79	Nick Ricci & Glen Ernst	Niagara Falls Flyers
1979–80	Rick LaFerriere & Terry Wright	Peterborough Petes
1980–81	Jim Ralph	Ottawa 67's
1981–82	John Vanbiesbrouck & Marc D'Amour	Sault Ste. Marie Greyhounds
1982–83	Peter Sidorkiewicz & Jeff Hogg	Oshawa Generals
1983–84	Darren Pang & Greg Coram	Ottawa 67's
1984–85	Scott Mosey & Marty Abrams	Sault Ste. Marie Greyhounds
1985–86	Kay Whitmore & Ron Tugnutt	Peterborough Petes
1986–87	Jeff Hackett & Sean Evoy	Oshawa Generals
1987–88	Todd Bojcun & John Tanner	Peterborough Petes
1988–89	John Tanner & Todd Bojcun	Peterborough Petes
1989–90	Jeff Wilson & Sean Gauthier	Kingston Frontenacs
1990–91	Mike Lenarduzzi & Kevin Hodson	Sault Ste. Marie Greyhounds
1991–92	Kevin Hodson	Sault Ste. Marie Greyhounds
1992–93	Chad Lang & Ryan Douglas	Peterborough Petes
1993–94	Sandy Allan & Scott Roche	North Bay Centennials
1994–95	Mark McArthur & Andy Adams	Guelph Storm
1995–96	Dan Cloutier & Brett Thompson	Guelph Storm
1996–97	Tim Keyes & Craig Hillier	Ottawa 67's
1997–98	Craig Hillier & Seamus Kotyk	Ottawa 67's
1998–99	Robert Holsinger & Rob Zepp	Plymouth Whalers
1999–2000	Rob Zepp & Bill Ruggiero	Plymouth Whalers
2000–01	Rob Zepp & Paul Drew	Plymouth Whalers
2001–02	Jason Bacashihua & Paul Drew	Plymouth Whalers
2002–03	Paul Drew & Jeff Weber	Plymouth Whalers
2003–04	Ryan MacDonald & Gerald Coleman	London Knights
2004–05	Gerald Coleman & Adam Dennis	London Knights
2005–06	Dan Turple & Mark Packwood	Kitchener Rangers
2006–07	Michal Neuvirth & Jeremy Smith	Plymouth Whalers
2007–08	Kyle Gajewski	Sault Ste. Marie Greyhounds
2008–09	Mike Murphy	Belleville Bulls
2009–10	Chris Carrozzi & J.P. Anderson	Mississauga St. Michael's Majors
2010–11	J. P. Anderson & Mickael Audette	Mississauga St. Michael's Majors
2011–12	Mark Visentin & Christopher Festarini	Niagara IceDogs
2012–13	Jordan Binnington & Brandon Hope	Owen Sound Attack
2013–14	Oscar Dansk & Devin Williams	Erie Otters
2014–15	Ken Appleby & Jeremy Brodeur	Oshawa Generals
2015–16	Tyler Parsons & Brendan Burke	London Knights
2016–17	Michael McNiven & Emanuel Vella	Owen Sound Attack
2017–18	Matthew Villalta & Tyler Johnson	Sault Ste. Marie Greyhounds
2018–19	Cedrick Andree & Michael DiPietro	Ottawa 67's
2019–20	Cedrick Andree & Will Cranley	Ottawa 67's
2020–21	Not awarded, season cancelled due to COVID-19 pandemic	
2021–22	Marco Costantini & Matteo Drobac	Hamilton Bulldogs
2022–23	Max Donoso & Collin MacKenzie	Ottawa 67's
2023–24	Michael Simpson & Owen Willmore	London Knights
2024–25	Austin Elliott & Alexei Medvedev	London Knights
2025–26	Ryder Fetterolf & Jaeden Nelson	Ottawa 67's

== See also ==
- List of Canadian Hockey League awards
