= Brandon Maxwell (ice hockey) =

American ice hockey player (born 1991)

- Born: March 22, 1991 (age 35) Winter Park, Florida, U.S.
- Height: 6 ft 1 in (185 cm)
- Weight: 196 lb (89 kg; 14 st 0 lb)
- Position: Goaltender
- Catches: Left
- DEL2 team Former teams: EC Kassel Huskies; HC Vítkovice; HC Dynamo Pardubice; BK Mladá Boleslav; Mountfield HK; Villacher SV; Fischtown Pinguins; Malmö Redhawks
- National team: United States
- NHL draft: 154th overall, 2009; Colorado Avalanche
- Playing career: 2013–present

Brandon Maxwell (born March 22, 1991) is a Canadian-American professional ice hockey goaltender who is currently playing for EC Kassel Huskies of the DEL2. He was drafted 154th overall in the sixth round by the Colorado Avalanche in the 2009 NHL entry draft, but went unsigned.

== Playing career ==
Maxwell took the AHMMPL junior league, where he defended the Cambridge Hawks during the 2006–07 season, through the USA Hockey National Team Development Program in Ann Arbor, Michigan, where he was a member of the U17 and U18 national team. In both age categories, he captured the 2008 World U18 Championship tournament and has won the bronze medal. From 2009 to 2012, he worked in the Canadian junior league, the Ontario Hockey League (Kitchener Rangers, Sarnia Sting, Mississauga St. Michael's Majors). During the 2012–13 season, he played hockey at the University of Guelph and also tried the Ukrainian Hockey League team, the Berkut Kyiv. The following year he spent in the Swedish Hockey League, where he captured 40 games for Rögle BK.

In the 2014–15 season, when he had one for Utah Grizzlies of the ECHL, he was approached by the HC Vítkovice. Maxwell, however, despite his good introduction to the Ostrava region, did not last long. He played five games with a g.a.a of 3.73 and a sv% of .853 Otherwise, he usually was on the bench. After a year in [Vítkovice], he left, but he remained in the Czech Extraliga. Before the start of the 2015–16 season, the [HC Dynamo Pardubice] signed him. Even though he was only playing in his first season in eastern Bohemia, he was one of their best players throughout the season.

He has also captured a total of 144 matches in the Czech Extraliga with a G.A.A of 2.42 and a Sv% .918 with 11 shutouts. He then moved as a free agent to play in Austria where he was a star for Villacher SV. Maxwell then moved to neighbouring Germany, featuring in parts of three seasons with the Fischtown Penguins of the Deutsche Eishockey Liga (DEL).

During the 2022–23 season, having posted 8 wins through 12 appearances with the Fischtown Pinguins, Maxwell left the club to sign a contract with Swedish top flight club, Malmö Redhawks, on January 6, 2023, providing cover for injured starting goaltender Daniel Marmenlind. Maxwell collected 3 wins through 10 appearances with the Redhawks before leaving at the conclusion of his short-term contract.

As a free agent, Maxwell returned to Germany in securing a one-year deal with EC Kassel Huskies of the DEL2 on May 4, 2023.

== International play ==
Medal record

Ice hockey

Representing United States

IIHF World U18 Championship
Bronze medal – third place	2008 Russia	

Maxwell was a member of the United States team that competed at the 2018 Winter Olympics.

== Personal life ==
Although Maxwell competes for the United States internationally, he holds dual citizenship with both the US and Canada.

== Career statistics ==
=== Regular season and playoffs ===
			Regular season									Playoffs
Season	Team	League	GP	W	L	OT	MIN	GA	SO	GAA	SV%	GP	W	L	MIN	GA	SO	GAA	SV%
2007–08	U.S. National Development Team	NAHL	21	8	10	1	1201	68	1	3.79	.845	—	—	—	—	—	—	—	—
2008–09	U.S. National Development Team	NAHL	11	7	3	1	666	35	0	3.15	.868	9	5	4	—	—	0	2.58	.915
2009–10	Kitchener Rangers	OHL	41	22	14	4	2362	147	1	3.73	.901	20	11	9	1181	76	0	3.86	.900
2010–11	Kitchener Rangers	OHL	46	23	15	6	2649	142	1	3.22	.903	4	1	3	256	16	0	3.75	.891
2011–12	Sarnia Sting	OHL	32	17	12	3	1801	97	1	3.23	.899	—	—	—	—	—	—	—	—
2011–12	Mississauga St. Michael's Majors	OHL	27	16	10	1	1488	63	5	2.54	.929	6	2	4	378	13	1	2.06	.933
2012–13	University of Guelph	OUAA	14	10	3	0	813	26	3	1.92	.935	—	—	—	—	—	—	—	—
2012–13	HC Berkut	Ukraine	3	2	1	0	185	5	1	1.62	.937	—	—	—	—	—	—	—	—
2013–14	Rögle BK	Allsv	40	20	20	0	2374	105	2	2.65	.903	—	—	—	—	—	—	—	—
2014–15	Utah Grizzlies	ECHL	1	1	0	0	65	3	0	2.77	.833	—	—	—	—	—	—	—	—
2014–15	HC Vítkovice	ELH	5	2	3	0	193	12	0	3.73	.853	—	—	—	—	—	—	—	—
2015–16	HC Dynamo Pardubice	ELH	41	15	26	0	2333	101	3	2.60	.915	—	—	—	—	—	—	—	—
2015–16	Šumperk	Czech.1	1	1	0	0	60	3	0	3.00	.919	—	—	—	—	—	—	—	—
2016–17	HC Dynamo Pardubice	ELH	15	4	11	0	833	37	0	2.67	.917	—	—	—	—	—	—	—	—
2016–17	BK Mladá Boleslav	ELH	16	8	8	0	923	31	4	2.02	.937	5	2	3	300	15	0	3.00	.905
2017–18	BK Mladá Boleslav	ELH	38	14	24	0	2126	87	3	2.46	.917	—	—	—	—	—	—	—	—
2018–19	Mountfield HK	ELH	29	16	13	0	1716	59	1	2.06	.918	2	0	2	120	8	0	4.00	.810
2019–20	EC VSV	EBEL	47	27	20	0	2833	112	0	2.37	.920	3	1	2	159	10	0	3.77	.892
2020–21	Fischtown Pinguins	DEL	26	16	9	0	1533	72	2	2.82	.917	3	1	2	181	8	0	2.64	.907
2021–22	Fischtown Pinguins	DEL	36	18	18	0	2175	99	3	2.73	.906	1	0	1	60	6	0	6.00	.864
2022–23	Fischtown Pinguins	DEL	12	8	4	0	713	28	1	2.36	.905	—	—	—	—	—	—	—	—
2022–23	Malmö Redhawks	SHL	10	3	7	0	602	28	0	2.79	.891	—	—	—	—	—	—	—	—
2023–24	EC Kassel Huskies	DEL2	31	20	10	0	1822	71	1	2.34	.909	15	10	5	916	33	0	2.16	.917
2024–25	EC Kassel Huskies	DEL2	33	21	12	0	1971	68	5	2.07	.923	—	—	—	—	—	—	—	—
ELH totals			144	59	85	0	8,124	327	11	2.41	.917	7	2	5	420	23	0	3.28	.899

=== International ===
Year	Team	Event	Result	GP	W	L	T	MIN	GA	SO	GAA	SV%
2008	United States	U17	2nd place, silver medalist(s)	5	4	1	0	300	11	1	2.20	.914
2008	United States	U18	3rd place, bronze medalist(s)	5	4	1	0	298	11	0	2.21	.926
2018	United States	OG	7th	—	—	—	—	—	—	—	—	—
Junior totals				10	8	2	0	598	22	1	2.21	.920
