= Bryan Cameron =

Canadian ice hockey player (born 1989)

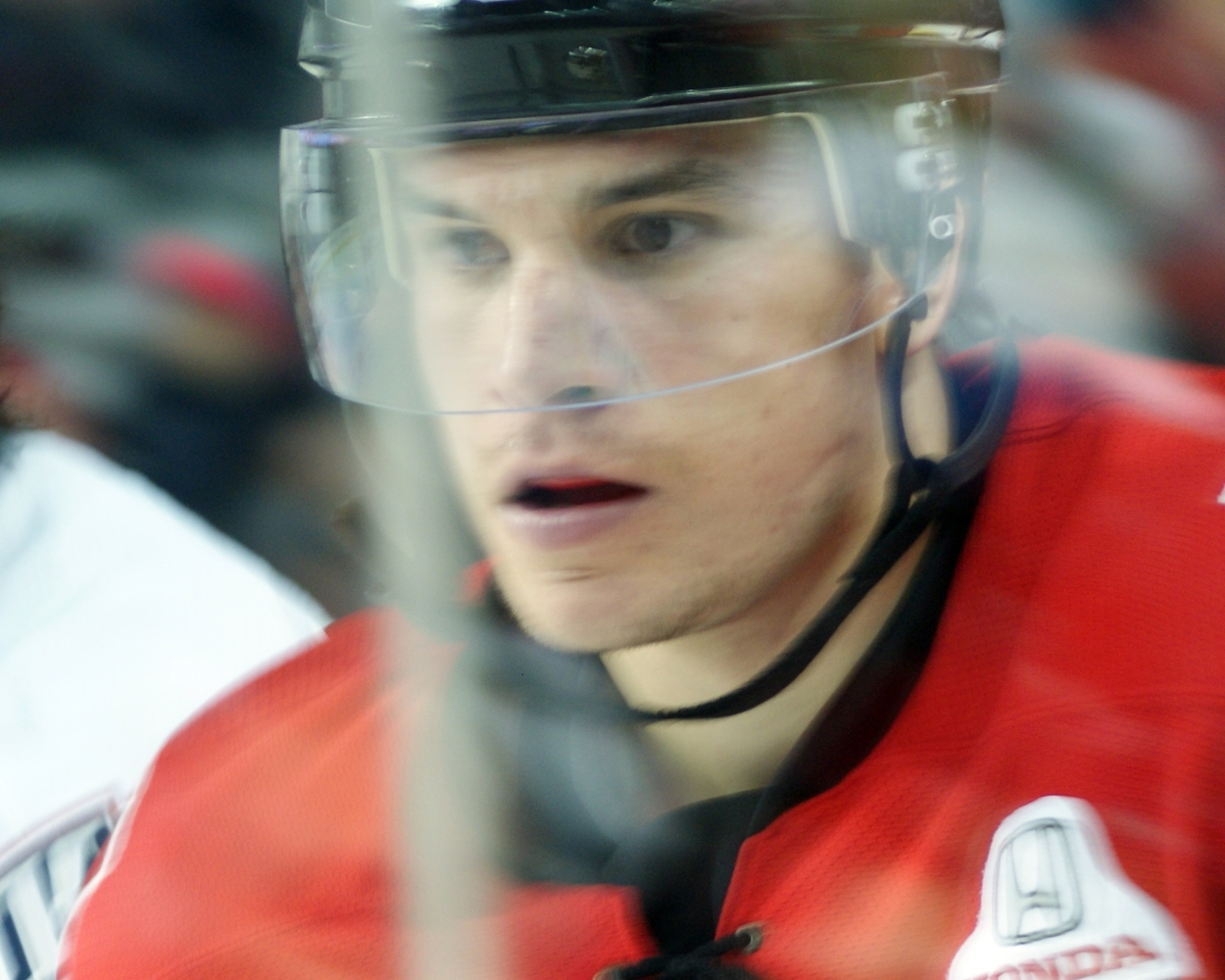
- Cameron with the Abbotsford Heat in 2011
- Born: 25 February 1989 (age 37) Brampton, Ontario, Canada
- Height: 5 ft 10 in (178 cm)
- Weight: 195 lb (88 kg; 13 st 13 lb)
- Position: Right wing
- Shot: Right
- Played for: Abbotsford Heat; STS Sanok; Fife Flyers
- NHL draft: 82nd overall, 2007; Los Angeles Kings
- Playing career: 2010–2018

Bryan Cameron (born 25 February 1989 in Brampton, Ontario) is a Canadian former professional ice hockey player.

== Playing career ==
Cameron was selected by the Los Angeles Kings in the third round of the 2007 NHL entry draft with the 82nd overall pick. On 30 April 2009, he was signed as a free agent by the Calgary Flames to a three-year entry-level contract. Throughout the tenure of his contract with the Flames, Cameron featured predominantly with their second tier affiliate in the ECHL, the Utah Grizzlies.

His rights were released by the Flames at the conclusion of his contract on 2 July 2013.

After a season abroad with Ciarko PBS Bank STS Sanok in the Polska Hokej Liga, the top-level league in Poland, Cameron returned as a free agent and agreed to a one-year deal in a return to the ECHL with the Atlanta Gladiators on 22 September 2016. In the 2016–17 season, Cameron register 10 points in 17 games with the Gladiators, before he opted to return abroad in agreeing to a move to the United Kingdom to sign for the Fife Flyers of the EIHL on 2 January 2017.

== Career statistics ==
			Regular season					Playoffs
Season	Team	League	GP	G	A	Pts	PIM	GP	G	A	Pts	PIM
2004–05	Milton Icehawks	OPJHL	2	0	0	0	0	—	—	—	—	—
2005–06	Belleville Bulls	OHL	64	20	9	29	46	6	1	2	3	6
2006–07	Belleville Bulls	OHL	60	33	25	58	50	15	4	8	12	15
2007–08	Belleville Bulls	OHL	68	41	37	78	56	21	4	9	13	10
2008–09	Belleville Bulls	OHL	64	37	44	81	51	17	7	7	14	18
2009–10	Barrie Colts	OHL	62	53	25	78	68	17	11	9	20	16
2010–11	Abbotsford Heat	AHL	60	6	9	15	41	—	—	—	—	—
2010–11	Victoria Salmon Kings	ECHL	7	3	3	6	2	—	—	—	—	—
2011–12	Utah Grizzlies	ECHL	20	7	4	11	12	—	—	—	—	—
2012–13	Utah Grizzlies	ECHL	47	15	23	38	34	—	—	—	—	—
2012–13	San Francisco Bulls	ECHL	17	5	4	9	8	5	1	2	3	0
2013–14	Arizona Sundogs	CHL	58	20	30	50	38	11	1	3	4	4
2014–15	Alaska Aces	ECHL	57	11	28	39	48	—	—	—	—	—
2015–16	STS Sanok	PHL	13	12	11	23	18	11	6	2	8	6
2016–17	Atlanta Gladiators	ECHL	17	2	8	10	10	—	—	—	—	—
2016–17	Fife Flyers	EIHL	11	2	7	9	8	1	0	0	0	0
2017–18	Saale Bulls Halle	GBun.3	4	4	2	6	16	—	—	—	—	—
2017–18	Brampton Beast	ECHL	4	0	1	1	2	—	—	—	—	—
2018–19	Hamilton Steelhawks	ACH	19	14	16	30	6	7	3	5	8	6
2019–20	Hamilton Steelhawks	ACH	14	4	6	10	10	5	2	3	5	2
AHL totals			60	6	9	15	41	—	—	—	—	—

== Awards and honours ==
Award	Year
OHL
All-Rookie Team	2006
Jim Mahon Memorial Trophy	2009
First All-Star Team	2009, 2010
Leo Lalonde Memorial Trophy	2010
