= Luke Pither =

Canadian ice hockey player (born 1989)

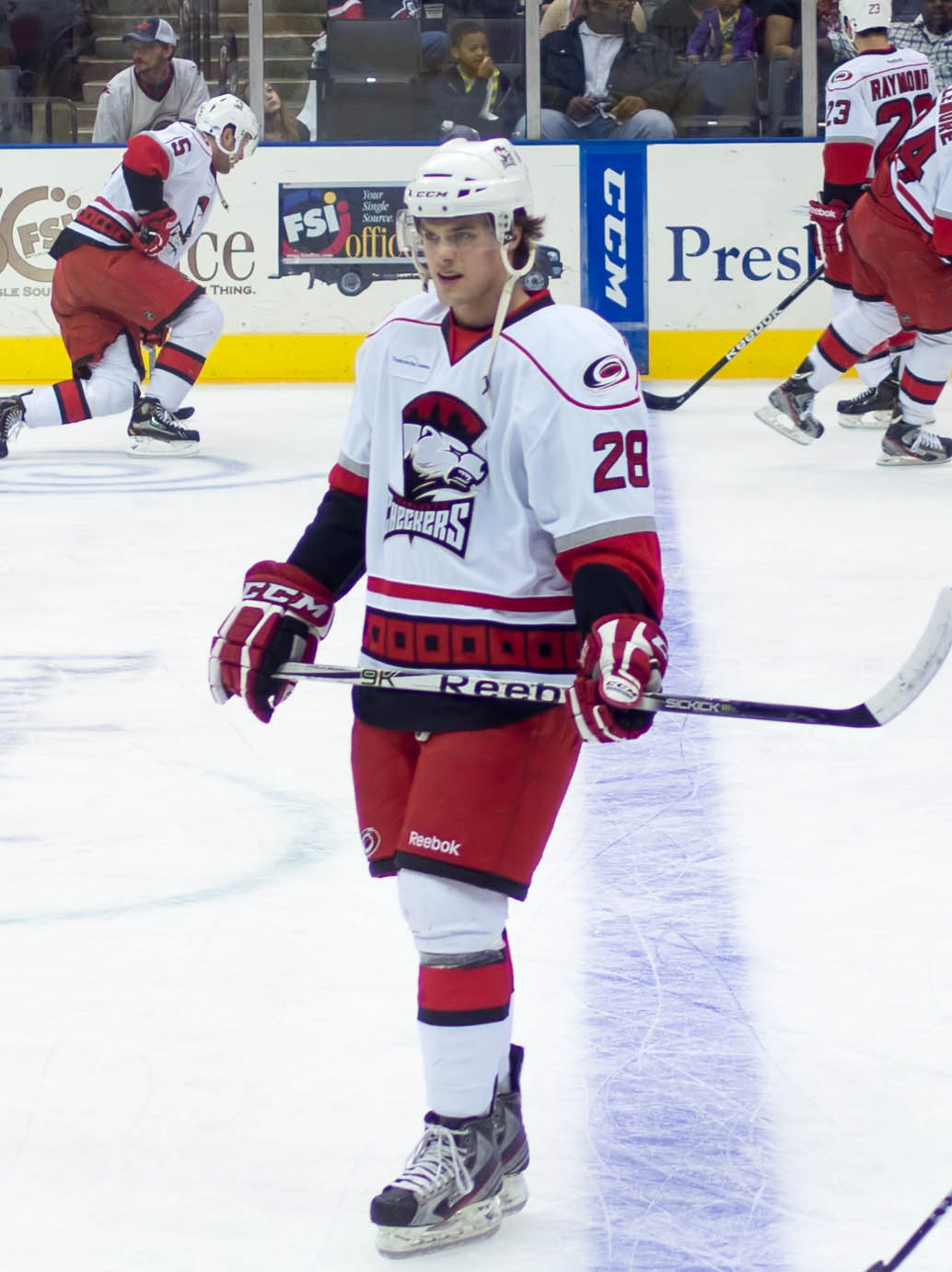
- Pither with the Charlotte Checkers in 2013
- Born: April 26, 1989 (age 37) Oshawa, Ontario, Canada
- Height: 6 ft 0 in (183 cm)
- Weight: 194 lb (88 kg; 13 st 12 lb)
- Position: Centre
- Shoots: Left
- DEL2 team Former teams: Bayreuth Tigers; Adirondack Phantoms; Charlotte Checkers; KalPa; EC KAC; St. John's IceCaps; Syracuse Crunch; Utica Comets; Almtuna IS; Nottingham Panthers; EHC Freiburg; HC Pustertal Wölfe
- Playing career: 2010–present

Luke Pither (born April 26, 1989) is a Canadian professional ice hockey centre. He is currently signed with Saugeen Shores Winterhawks of the WOAA Senior AA Hockey League.

== Playing career ==
After five seasons of playing junior hockey in the Ontario Hockey League, Pither signed a three-year entry-level contract with the Philadelphia Flyers on March 4, 2010.

On January 13, 2013, it was announced Pither was traded by the Flyers to the Carolina Hurricanes in exchange for goalie Brian Boucher and Mark Alt.

On July 29, 2013, Pither moved abroad and signed a one-year contract as a free agent in Finland with KalPa who competed in the Liiga. In the 2013–14 season, Pither was hampered by injury and played in just 20 games, contributing with 5 goals.

Pither opted to change European leagues, in agreeing to a one-year contract with Austrian club EC KAC of the EBEL on May 22, 2014.

After two seasons in Europe, Pither returned to North America and with the 2015–16 season underway, signed a contract with the Brampton Beast of the ECHL on October 28, 2015. He played two seasons with the Beast, with short stints spread throughout the AHL, before agreeing to return abroad in signing a one-year deal with Swedish outfit, Almtuna IS, of the HockeyAllsvenskan on June 7, 2017.

In January 2018, Pither moved to the UK's EIHL to sign for the Nottingham Panthers, remaining with the team until 2019.

After a season in Germany's DEL2 with EHC Freiburg, Pither returned to Canada to sign with former club, the Brampton Beast of the ECHL on October 16, 2020. With the Beast later suspending operations for the season due to the ongoing COVID-19 pandemic, Pither was subsequently released as a free agent.

Pither later had a short spell in the Alps Hockey League (AlpsHL) with HC Pustertal Wölfe before returning to the DEL2 for the 2021-22 season with Bayreuth Tigers.

== Career statistics ==
			Regular season					Playoffs
Season	Team	League	GP	G	A	Pts	PIM	GP	G	A	Pts	PIM
2004–05	Bowmanville Eagles	OPJHL	2	1	0	1	0	—	—	—	—	—
2005–06	Kingston Frontenacs	OHL	68	4	9	13	26	6	0	1	1	2
2006–07	Kingston Frontenacs	OHL	5	1	0	1	2	—	—	—	—	—
2006–07	Guelph Storm	OHL	52	15	13	28	22	4	1	0	1	2
2007–08	Guelph Storm	OHL	51	13	29	42	31	10	0	2	2	0
2008–09	Guelph Storm	OHL	41	16	14	30	22	—	—	—	—	—
2008–09	Belleville Bulls	OHL	23	19	23	42	10	17	6	13	19	6
2009–10	Barrie Colts	OHL	67	36	58	94	44	17	9	11	20	4
2010–11	Adirondack Phantoms	AHL	67	9	11	20	19	—	—	—	—	—
2011–12	Adirondack Phantoms	AHL	39	2	8	10	18	—	—	—	—	—
2011–12	Trenton Titans	ECHL	4	0	1	1	4	—	—	—	—	—
2012–13	Trenton Titans	ECHL	11	2	1	3	12	—	—	—	—	—
2012–13	Wheeling Nailers	ECHL	24	9	13	22	6	—	—	—	—	—
2012–13	Charlotte Checkers	AHL	23	6	12	18	20	—	—	—	—	—
2013–14	KalPa	Liiga	20	5	2	7	26	—	—	—	—	—
2014–15	EC KAC	EBEL	48	11	14	25	22	9	1	1	2	6
2015–16	Brampton Beast	ECHL	26	9	11	20	24	—	—	—	—	—
2015–16	St. John's IceCaps	AHL	6	0	3	3	6	—	—	—	—	—
2015–16	Syracuse Crunch	AHL	1	0	0	0	0	—	—	—	—	—
2016–17	Brampton Beast	ECHL	37	17	27	44	36	12	2	6	8	2
2016–17	Utica Comets	AHL	1	0	0	0	0	—	—	—	—	—
2017–18	Almtuna IS	Allsv	31	7	5	12	10	—	—	—	—	—
2017–18	Nottingham Panthers	EIHL	22	10	19	29	16	4	3	3	6	0
2018–19	Nottingham Panthers	EIHL	60	22	27	49	48	3	0	3	3	2
2019–20	EHC Freiburg	DEL2	47	21	41	62	73	—	—	—	—	—
2020–21	HC Pustertal Wölfe	AlpsHL	5	0	4	4	2	—	—	—	—	—
2021–22	Bayreuth Tigers	DEL2	40	12	26	38	22	—	—	—	—	—
2022–23	Saugeen Shores Winterhawks	WOAA	10	8	11	19	4	9	5	8	13	6
2023–24	Saugeen Shores Winterhawks	OEHL	5	4	4	8	0	5	2	5	7	0
AHL totals			137	17	34	51	63	—	—	—	—	—
