= Philip McRae =

American ice hockey player (born 1990)

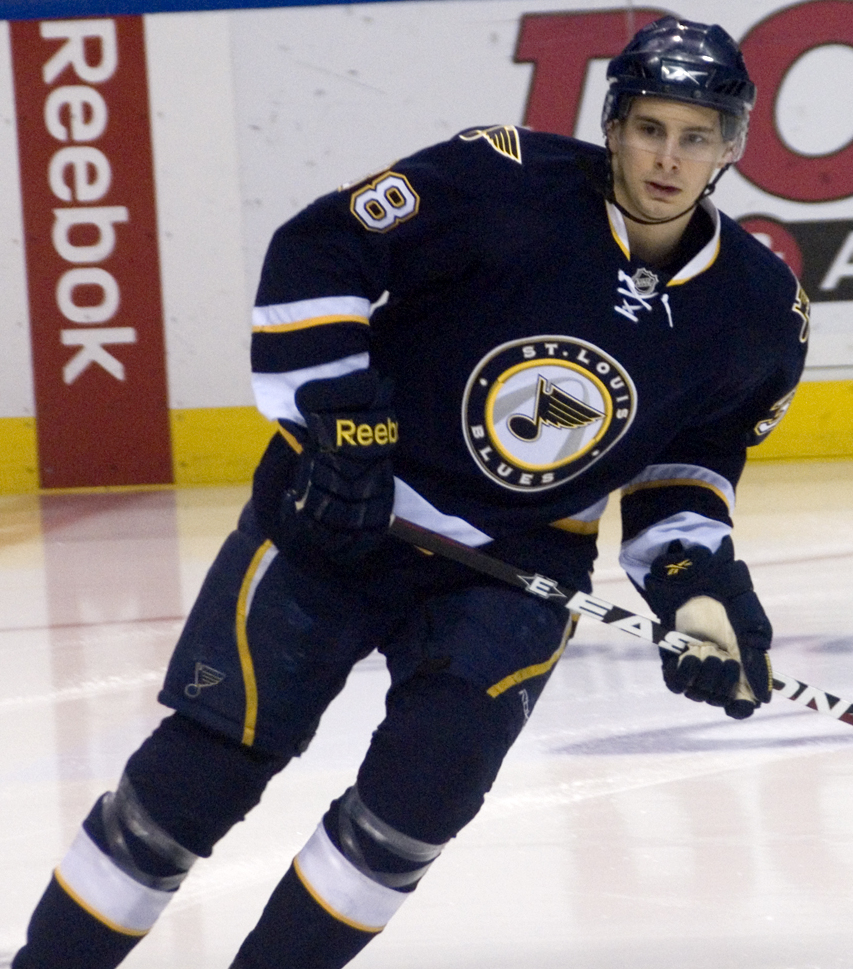
- McRae with the St. Louis Blues in 2011
- Born: March 15, 1990 (age 36) Chesterfield, Missouri, U.S.
- Height: 6 ft 3 in (191 cm)
- Weight: 191 lb (87 kg; 13 st 9 lb)
- Position: Center
- Shot: Left
- Played for: St. Louis Blues; Tappara; Espoo Blues; Ässät; Schwenninger Wild Wings; Orli Znojmo
- NHL draft: 33rd overall, 2008; St. Louis Blues
- Playing career: 2010–2020

Philip Christopher McRae (born March 15, 1990) is an American former professional ice hockey player who last played for Orli Znojmo in the Austrian Hockey League (EBEL). He was selected by the St. Louis Blues in the 2nd round (33rd overall) of the 2008 NHL entry draft and would end up playing 15 games in the National Hockey League (NHL), all with the Blues.

== Playing career ==
McRae, a native of St. Louis, played his freshman season with Christian Brothers College High School in Town & Country. He then went on to play major junior hockey for the London Knights of the Ontario Hockey League.

The son of former Minnesota North Stars and St. Louis Blues winger Basil McRae, he began the 2010–11 season playing in the AHL with the Peoria Rivermen. Before joining the Rivermen, he spent his summer with former Blues forward Keith Tkachuk to get a feel for playing in professional hockey. On January 11, 2011, he was called up to the NHL by the St. Louis Blues to make his NHL debut the following evening, playing more than 12 minutes and taking a 2-minute tripping penalty, for the Blues in a 7-4 road game loss to the Anaheim Ducks. McRae scored his first NHL goal on January 26, 2011 against Miikka Kiprusoff of the Calgary Flames. He and his father became the fourth father-son combination to play for the Blues, joining Bob and Brent Johnson, Peter, Yan, and Paul Stastny, and Mike and B.J. Crombeen.

In the 2013–14 season, as an unsigned restricted free agent with the St. Louis Blues, McRae opted to venture abroad to the Finnish Liiga with Tappara. After just 8 games in Tampere, McRae secured a transfer to fellow Finnish club, Espoo Blues for the remainder of the season.

On July 1, 2014, McRae returned to the St. Louis Blues fold, in signing a one-year, two-way contract. In the 2014–15 season he was assigned to AHL affiliate, the Chicago Wolves and in 67 games scored 15 goals.

On August 7, 2015, McRae continued his career in the AHL, signing as a free agent to a one-year contract with the Bakersfield Condors, an affiliate of the Edmonton Oilers. In the Condors inaugural 2015–16 season in the AHL, McRae appeared in 35 games producing 9 goals and 15 points.

As a free agent in the off-season, McRae opted to continue his career in the AHL, signing a one-year deal with the New York Rangers affiliate, the Hartford Wolf Pack on August 24, 2016.

After three seasons in the AHL, McRae returned to a second stint in Finland, agreeing to a one-year deal with Ässät of the Liiga on June 1, 2017. In the 2017–18 season, McRae established himself as a versatile forward, contributing with 21 points in 42 games.

As a free agent in the following off-season, McRae continued his career in Europe by agreeing to a one-year contract with German outfit Schwenninger Wild Wings of the DEL on April 20, 2018. In the 2018–19 season, McRae secured a top-nine role among the forwards and contributed with 5 goals and 12 points through 44 games, but was unable to help the Wild Wings progress to the post-season. At the completion of the season, McRae left Schwenninger at the conclusion of his contract.

On May 22, 2019, McRae moved to the neighbouring EBEL, agreeing to a one-year deal with Orli Znojmo. Following the 2019-2020 season, McRae would retire from professional hockey.

== Career statistics ==
=== Regular season and playoffs ===
			Regular season					Playoffs
Season	Team	League	GP	G	A	Pts	PIM	GP	G	A	Pts	PIM
2005–06	U.S. National Development Team	NAHL	33	8	8	16	9	10	1	2	3	2
2006–07	London Knights	OHL	63	2	8	10	27	16	0	0	0	6
2007–08	London Knights	OHL	66	18	28	46	61	4	0	0	0	7
2008–09	London Knights	OHL	59	29	31	60	54	14	5	5	10	12
2009–10	London Knights	OHL	33	11	26	37	43	—	—	—	—	—
2009–10	Plymouth Whalers	OHL	19	5	9	14	21	9	6	9	15	11
2010–11	Peoria Rivermen	AHL	46	12	14	26	23	—	—	—	—	—
2010–11	St. Louis Blues	NHL	15	1	2	3	2	—	—	—	—	—
2011–12	Peoria Rivermen	AHL	71	23	16	39	26	—	—	—	—	—
2012–13	Peoria Rivermen	AHL	45	7	11	18	19	—	—	—	—	—
2013–14	Tappara	Liiga	8	0	1	1	2	—	—	—	—	—
2013–14	Espoo Blues	Liiga	45	8	12	20	12	7	3	1	4	2
2014–15	Chicago Wolves	AHL	67	15	18	33	21	—	—	—	—	—
2015–16	Bakersfield Condors	AHL	35	9	6	15	33	—	—	—	—	—
2016–17	Hartford Wolf Pack	AHL	76	8	11	19	20	—	—	—	—	—
2017–18	Ässät	Liiga	42	5	16	21	43	1	0	0	0	0
2018–19	Schwenninger Wild Wings	DEL	44	5	7	12	10	—	—	—	—	—
2019–20	Orli Znojmo	EBEL	44	16	16	32	12	—	—	—	—	—
NHL totals			15	1	2	3	2	—	—	—	—	—

=== International ===
Year	Team	Event	Result	GP	G	A	Pts	PIM
2006	United States	U17	2nd place, silver medalist(s)	6	0	1	1	0
2008	United States	WJC18	3rd place, bronze medalist(s)	7	3	3	6	4
2010	United States	WJC	1st place, gold medalist(s)	7	1	4	5	2
Junior totals				20	4	8	12	6
