= Ryan Hayes (ice hockey) =

American ice hockey player (born 1989)

- Born: June 4, 1989 (age 37) Syracuse, New York, U.S.
- Height: 5 ft 9 in (175 cm)
- Weight: 176 lb (80 kg; 12 st 8 lb)
- Position: Forward
- Shot: Right
- Played for: Trenton Devils; Greenville Road Warriors; Trenton Titans; South Carolina Stingrays; Stockton Thunder; Utah Grizzlies; Edinburgh Capitals; Sheffield Steelers; Frisk Asker; ZSC Lions; GCK Lions; SC Langenthal; EHC Lustenau
- NHL draft: Undrafted
- Playing career: 2010–2023
- Coaching career: 2023–present

Ryan Hayes (born June 4, 1989) is an American ice hockey coach and former player. He is currently serving as an assistant coach to the USA Hockey National Team Development Program.

== Playing career ==
Hayes played major junior hockey in the Ontario Hockey League (OHL) with the Plymouth Whalers. He was honored by the OHL when he was awarded the 2009–10 Dan Snyder Memorial Trophy as the OHL Humanitarian of the Year. He was further honored when he also received the 2009–10 CHL Humanitarian of the Year award, given annually to the Canadian Hockey League player judged to have made the most notable contribution to his community in a humanitarian sense.

Hayes began his professional career playing with the Trenton Devils for the 2010–11 ECHL season, but during the off-season, he was traded to the Greenville Road Warriors for winger Matt Schepke. Greenville choose to waive Hayes after just two games, and he signed on to play with the Trenton Titans for the remainder of the 2011–12 ECHL season. He start the 2012–13 season with Trenton before being traded the South Carolina Stingrays after 12 games and then traded again to the Stockton Thunder before their playoff run. He continued to play for Stockton until being traded to the Utah Grizzlies on January 16, 2015 during the 2014–15 season.

On July 3, 2015, Hayes left North America and signed his first contract abroad on a one-year deal with Scottish club, Edinburgh Capitals of the UK's Elite Ice Hockey League. However, in January 2016, Hayes signed for the Sheffield Steelers, only to be released by the club after seven games. In February 2016, he returned to the ECHL and the Utah Grizzlies.

After the season with the Grizzlies, Hayes opted to return to Europe, signing a one-year deal with Norwegian club Frisk Asker of the GET-ligaen on June 15, 2016.
