= Mark Visentin =

Canadian ice hockey player

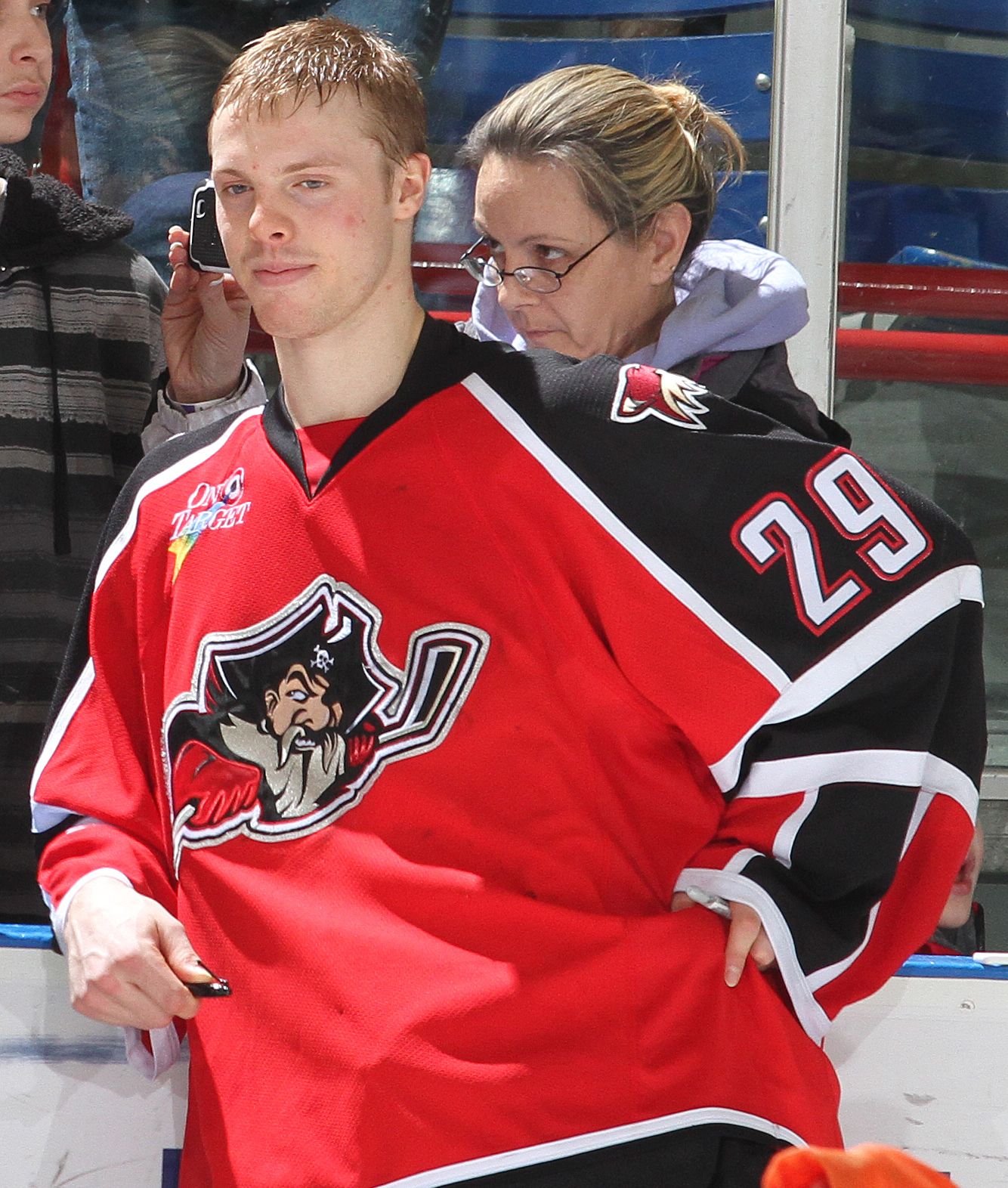
- Visentin with the Portland Pirates in 2014
- Born: August 7, 1992 (age 33) Waterdown, Ontario, Canada
- Height: 6 ft 2 in (188 cm)
- Weight: 192 lb (87 kg; 13 st 10 lb)
- Position: Goaltender
- Caught: Left
- Played for: Phoenix Coyotes; Alba Volán Székesfehérvár
- NHL draft: 27th overall, 2010; Phoenix Coyotes
- Playing career: 2012–2017

Mark Visentin (born August 7, 1992) is a Canadian former professional ice hockey goaltender. He was selected in the first round, 27th overall, by the Phoenix Coyotes in the 2010 NHL entry draft.

Visentin represented Canada at the 2011 World Junior Championships, starting four games in the tournament, and during the 2012 World Junior Championships, starting Canada's opening game against Finland.

== Playing career ==
=== Minor ===
Visentin played minor ice hockey with the Halton Hurricanes, winning a provincial PeeWee AAA championship in 2002–03. He played in the 2005 Quebec International Pee-Wee Hockey Tournament with Halton. He was selected by the Niagara IceDogs in the third round, 54th overall, of the 2008 Ontario Hockey League (OHL) Priority Selection.

=== Junior ===
Visentin made his OHL debut for the IceDogs during the 2008–09 season. He played in 23 games, winning five. In the 2009–10 season, Visentin saw increased playing time, appearing in 55 games and winning 24. After the season, Visentin was ranked fourth among North American goalies by the NHL Central Scouting Bureau. He was then drafted by the Phoenix Coyotes in the first round, 27th overall, of the 2010 NHL entry draft.

=== Professional ===
At the tail end of the 2013–14 season, Visentin was recalled from Phoenix's American Hockey League (AHL) affiliate, the Portland Pirates, and on April 12, 2014, he made his NHL debut in net with the Coyotes in a 3–2 defeat to the San Jose Sharks.

During the Coyotes 2014 training camp, Visentin suffered an ankle injury which ended up leading to season ending surgery. Due to the nature of the surgery, Visentin did not partake in a single game during the 2014-2015 season.

Following the 2014-15 season, the Coyotes elected not to give Visentin a qualifying offer, making him an unrestricted free agent. On July 8, 2015, Visentin signed a one-year contract with the Rockford IceHogs, the AHL affiliate of the Chicago Blackhawks. In the 2015–16 season, Visentin appeared in only 13 games with 4 wins, before his season was cut short due another ankle injury which required season ending surgery.

As a free agent in the off-season, Visentin remained in the AHL despite leaving the IceHogs, agreeing to a one-year deal with the Milwaukee Admirals, an affiliate to the Nashville Predators on August 1, 2016. The deal reacquainted Visentin and Ben Vanderklok (Ben served as Visentin's goaltending coach for all four years while playing in Niagara). He appeared in just one game with the Admirals in the 2016–17 season, primarily playing in the ECHL with affiliate, the Cincinnati Cyclones, in winning 10 contests in 26 games.

Visentin opted to pursue European opportunities for the 2017-2018 season, agreeing to a one-year deal with Hungarian club Alba Volán Székesfehérvár of the Erste Bank Eishockey Liga (EBEL) on May 17, 2017. Visentin's contract with Székesfehérvár was terminated due to an injury on October 3, 2017 after appearing in only one game.

On October 2, 2018, Visentin announced his retirement from professional hockey via Twitter.

== International play ==
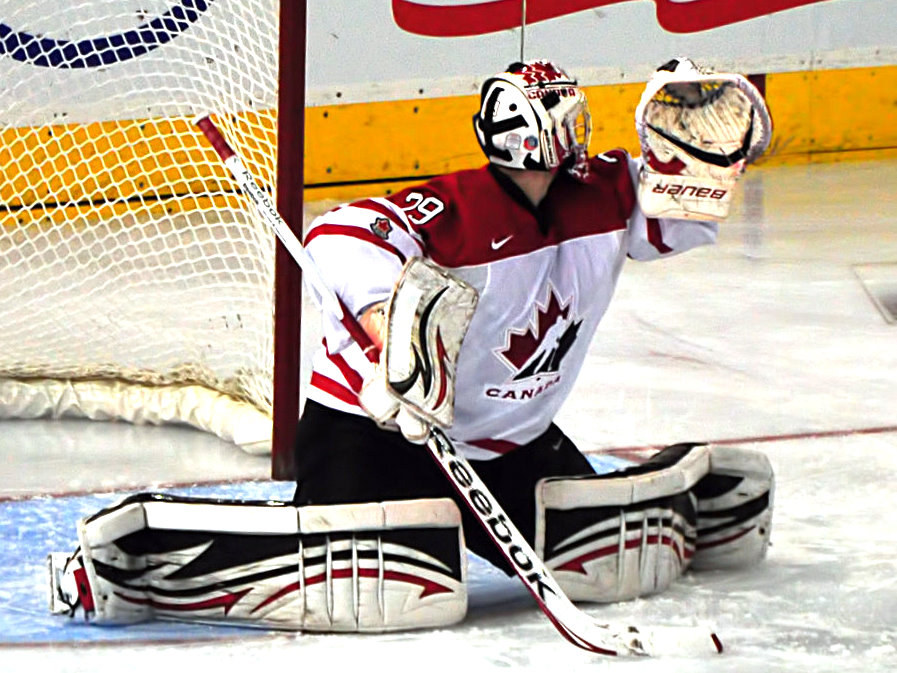
- Visentin with Team Canada at the 2012 World Junior Championships.

Medal record

Representing Canada

Ice hockey

World Junior Championships
Silver medal – second place	2011 Canada	
Bronze medal – third place	2012 Canada	

Visentin's first experience with Hockey Canada resulted in a gold medal with Team Ontario at the 2009 World Under-17 Hockey Challenge. During the summer of 2010, Visentin spent time in the summer at Team Canada's summer development camp, as well as Hockey Canada's goaltender camp. Visentin was named to Canada's roster for the 2011 World Junior Championships. Olivier Roy was Canada's starting goaltender for most of the tournament, but Visentin replaced him after Canada's loss to Sweden. Visentin started in Canada's wins against Switzerland in the quarterfinals, and against the United States in the semi-finals, for which he was named Canada's Player of the Game. These performances secured his spot as Canada's starting goaltender in the gold medal game against Russia. But in the final, Visentin conceded five goals in the third period as Russia came from behind to win 5–3. After the game, Visentin struggled to explain what had happened: "There's really no words to describe it."

== Personal life ==
Growing up in the community of Waterdown, Ontario, Visentin's favourite hockey team was the Montreal Canadiens, and his favourite player was Carey Price.

== Career statistics ==
=== Regular season and playoffs ===
			Regular season									Playoffs
Season	Team	League	GP	W	L	T/OT	MIN	GA	SO	GAA	SV%	GP	W	L	MIN	GA	SO	GAA	SV%
2007–08	Halton Hurricanes	OMHA	44	—	—	—	1980	98	0	2.22	—	—	—	—	—	—	—	—	—
2008–09	Niagara IceDogs	OHL	23	5	11	3	1099	78	0	4.26	.871	—	—	—	—	—	—	—	—
2009–10	Niagara IceDogs	OHL	55	24	26	5	3209	160	0	2.99	.911	5	1	4	305	18	0	3.54	.904
2010–11	Niagara IceDogs	OHL	46	30	9	6	2714	114	4	2.52	.917	14	9	5	823	35	1	2.55	.929
2011–12	Niagara IceDogs	OHL	42	30	9	2	2407	80	10	1.99	.926	20	13	7	1217	51	0	2.51	.915
2012–13	Portland Pirates	AHL	30	15	12	1	1669	83	2	2.98	.903	—	—	—	—	—	—	—	—
2012–13	Gwinnett Gladiators	ECHL	1	1	0	0	60	2	0	2.00	.929	—	—	—	—	—	—	—	—
2013–14	Portland Pirates	AHL	45	14	19	6	2341	127	0	3.25	.902	—	—	—	—	—	—	—	—
2013–14	Phoenix Coyotes	NHL	1	0	1	0	59	3	0	3.05	.906	—	—	—	—	—	—	—	—
2015–16	Rockford IceHogs	AHL	13	4	6	2	716	31	1	2.60	.906	—	—	—	—	—	—	—	—
2016–17	Cincinnati Cyclones	ECHL	26	10	11	2	1469	72	2	2.94	.893	—	—	—	—	—	—	—	—
2016–17	Milwaukee Admirals	AHL	1	0	0	1	65	2	0	1.85	.944	—	—	—	—	—	—	—	—
2017–18	Alba Volán Székesfehérvár	EBEL	1	0	1	0	20	5	0	15.00	.643	—	—	—	—	—	—	—	—
NHL totals			1	0	1	0	59	3	0	3.05	.906	—	—	—	—	—	—	—	—

== Awards and honours ==
Honours	Year
OHL First All-Star Team	2010–11
OHL Goaltender of the Year	2010–11
Dave Pinkney Trophy – OHL Lowest Team Goals Against (shared with Christopher Festarini)	2011–12

Awards and achievements
Preceded by Brandon Gormley	Phoenix Coyotes first-round draft pick 2010	Succeeded by Connor Murphy
