= Phil Lane (ice hockey) =

American ice hockey player

- Born: May 29, 1992 (age 34) Rochester, New York, U.S.
- Height: 6 ft 3 in (191 cm)
- Weight: 205 lb (93 kg; 14 st 9 lb)
- Position: Right wing
- Shot: Right
- Played for: Portland Pirates; Springfield Falcons; Milwaukee Admirals; Binghamton Devils; Cleveland Monsters; Stavanger Oilers; SønderjyskE
- NHL draft: 52nd overall, 2010; Phoenix Coyotes
- Playing career: 2012–2020

Phil Lane (born May 29, 1992) is an American former professional ice hockey forward. He last played with SønderjyskE of the Metal Ligaen. Lane was selected by the Phoenix Coyotes in the 2nd round (52nd overall) of the 2010 NHL entry draft.

== Playing career ==
Lane played three seasons (2009 – 2012) of major junior hockey in the Ontario Hockey League (OHL) with the Brampton Battalion, scoring 50 goals and 57 assists for 107 points, while earning 259 penalty minutes, in 171 OHL games played.

On May 29, 2012, the Phoenix Coyotes signed Lane to a three-year entry-level contract. At the conclusion of his NHL contract, Lane remained within the Coyotes organization agreeing to a one-year AHL deal with new AHL affiliate, the Springfield Falcons.

As a free agent over the summer and unable to secure a contract within the AHL, Lane signed his first contract with the ECHL, agreeing to a deal with the Adirondack Thunder on October 12, 2016. In an injury plagued 2016–17 season, Lane tallied 10 goals in 26 games.

On September 5, 2017, Lane's rights were traded by the Thunder to the Atlanta Gladiators in exchange for Eric Neiley. He subsequently agreed to a one-year deal with the club.

As a free agent on June 15, 2018, Lane secured a one-year contract abroad with Norwegian outfit, the Stavanger Oilers of the GET-ligaen.

== Career statistics ==
			Regular season					Playoffs
Season	Team	League	GP	G	A	Pts	PIM	GP	G	A	Pts	PIM
2008–09	Buffalo Jr. Sabres	OJHL	45	18	24	42	72	—	—	—	—	—
2009–10	Brampton Battalion	OHL	64	18	14	32	52	11	3	0	3	14
2010–11	Brampton Battalion	OHL	54	17	17	34	113	4	0	1	1	2
2011–12	Brampton Battalion	OHL	53	15	26	41	94	8	4	1	5	7
2012–13	Portland Pirates	AHL	70	14	8	22	61	3	0	1	1	9
2013–14	Portland Pirates	AHL	39	3	3	6	49	—	—	—	—	—
2014–15	Portland Pirates	AHL	53	3	7	10	39	5	1	1	2	2
2015–16	Springfield Falcons	AHL	56	6	4	10	70	—	—	—	—	—
2016–17	Adirondack Thunder	ECHL	26	10	6	16	43	—	—	—	—	—
2017–18	Atlanta Gladiators	ECHL	62	32	25	57	105	4	0	2	2	2
2017–18	Milwaukee Admirals	AHL	3	1	0	1	0	—	—	—	—	—
2017–18	Binghamton Devils	AHL	3	0	0	0	0	—	—	—	—	—
2017–18	Cleveland Monsters	AHL	4	1	2	3	6	—	—	—	—	—
2018–19	Stavanger Oilers	GET	31	15	10	25	61	9	4	4	8	22
2019–20	SønderjyskE	DEN	47	15	16	31	66	—	—	—	—	—
AHL totals			228	28	24	52	225	8	1	2	3	11
