= Ryan Martindale =

Canadian ice hockey player

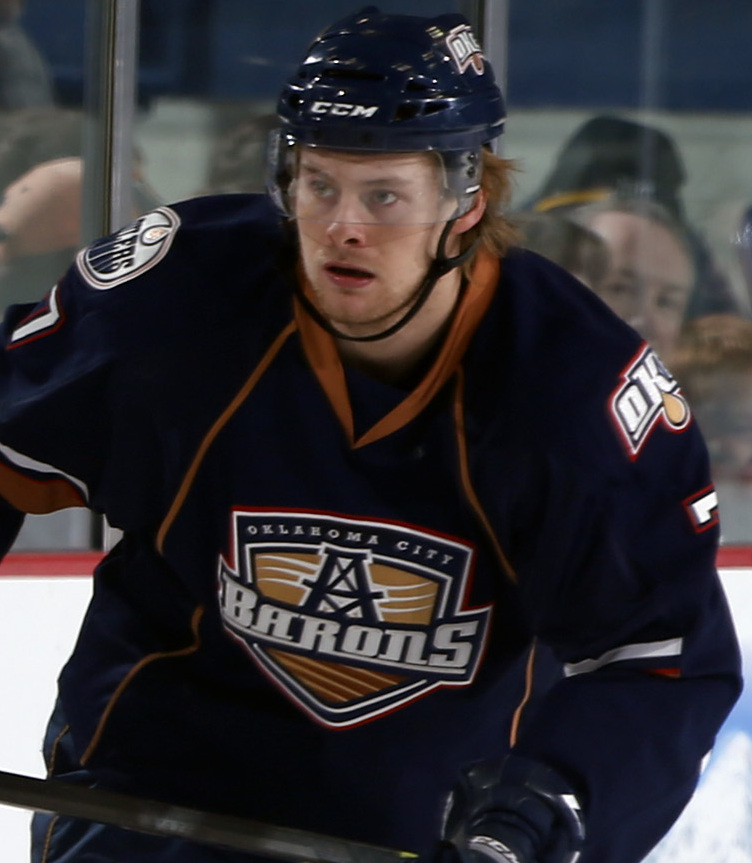
- Martindale with the Oklahoma City Barons in 2013
- Born: October 27, 1991 (age 34) Brooklin, Ontario, Canada
- Height: 6 ft 3 in (191 cm)
- Weight: 207 lb (94 kg; 14 st 11 lb)
- Position: Centre
- Shot: Left
- Played for: Oklahoma City Barons; San Antonio Rampage; Syracuse Crunch; Esbjerg Energy; Sheffield Steelers
- NHL draft: 61st overall, 2010; Edmonton Oilers
- Playing career: 2011–2018

Medal record

Ice hockey

Representing Canada Ontario

World U-17 Hockey Challenge
| Gold medal – first place | 2008 London | |

Ryan Martindale (born October 27, 1991) is a Canadian former professional ice hockey player. He has previously played under contract to the Florida Panthers of the National Hockey League (NHL). Martindale was originally selected by the Edmonton Oilers in the 3rd round (61st overall) of the 2010 NHL entry draft.

== Playing career ==
Martindale played Junior Hockey with the Ottawa 67's. On October 8, 2011, the Oilers signed Martindale to a three-year entry-level contract.

On January 17, 2014, Martindale was traded from the Oilers organization to the Florida Panthers in exchange for Steve Pinizzotto.

During the 2014–15 season, on March 2, 2015, Martindale left his AHL affiliate, the San Antonio Rampage was loaned to the Syracuse Crunch by the Florida Panthers. In return, Tampa Bay loaned Matt Corrente to the Rampage.

On September 8, 2015, Martindale as a free agent agreed to attend the Tampa Bay Lightning's training camp for the 2015–16 season. Having left the Lightning without a contract, Martindale belatedly signed a contract with the Florida Everblades of the ECHL on November 26, 2015. He was loaned to AHL and Lightning affiliate, the Syracuse Crunch, on three occasions, and was later signed to an AHL deal to remain with the Crunch on March 8, 2016.

As a free agent in the off-season, Martindale opted to pursue a European career, agreeing to a one-year deal with Danish club Esbjerg Energy of the Metal Ligaen on July 22, 2016.

On September 27, 2018, Martindale signed with the Sheffield Steelers of the Elite Ice Hockey League (EIHL). He played in one game before leaving the team for personal reasons on October 4, 2018.
