= Kalle Ekelund =

Swedish professional ice hockey player

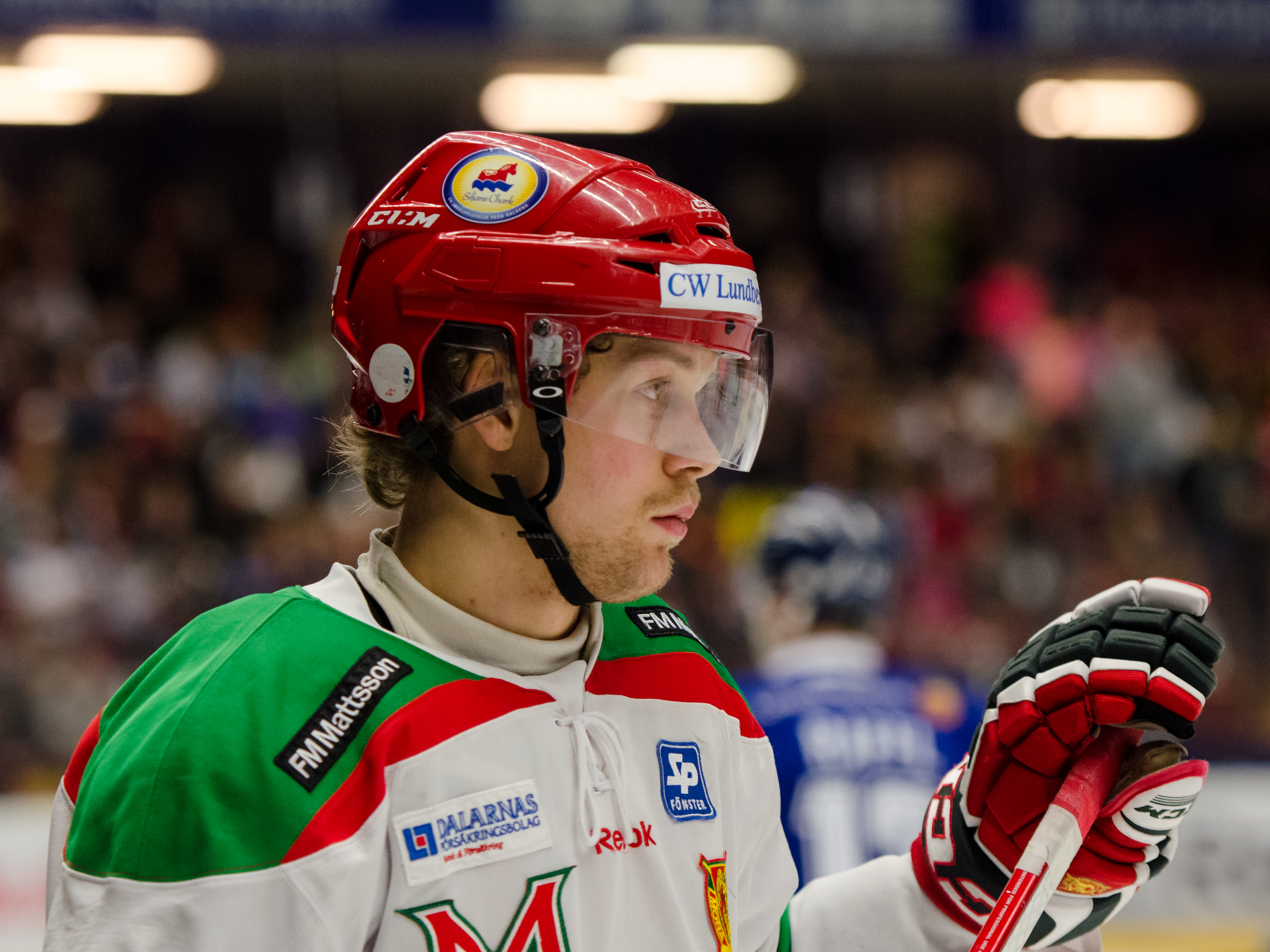
- Ekelund with Mora IK in 2012
- Born: July 25, 1990 (age 34); Nybro, Sweden
- Height: 6 ft 4 in (193 cm)
- Weight: 220 lb (100 kg; 15 st 10 lb)
- Position: Defense
- Shoots: Right
- GET team Former teams: Vålerenga; Nybro Vikings; Mora IK; Karlskrona HK; IF Björklöven; Sparta Warriors
- NHL draft: Undrafted
- Playing career: 2007–present

Kalle Ekelund (born July 25, 1990) is a Swedish professional ice hockey player. He is currently playing with Vålerenga Ishockey of the Norwegian GET-ligaen (GET).

== Playing career ==
Undrafted, Ekelund made his HockeyAllsvenskan debut playing with Nybro Vikings during the 2007–08 season.

After two seasons in the GET-ligaen with the Sparta Warriors, Ekelund continued his career in Norway, signing as a free agent to a two-year contract with Vålerenga Ishockey on 9 April 2018.
