= Yegor Omelyanenko =

Russian ice hockey player

- Born: 10 July 1993 (age 32) Khabarovsk, Russia
- Height: 5 ft 11 in (180 cm)
- Weight: 190 lb (86 kg; 13 st 8 lb)
- Position: Left wing
- Shot: Left
- Played for: Amur Khabarovsk (KHL); Lada Togliatti (VHL); Podhale Nowy Targ (Poland)
- NHL draft: Undrafted
- Playing career: 2013–2015

Yegor Sergeyevich Omelyanenko (Russian: Егор Сергеевич Омельяненко; born 10 July 1993) is a Russian former professional ice hockey player. He played for Amur Khabarovsk of the Kontinental Hockey League (KHL) and Podhale Nowy Targ of the Polska Hokej Liga.

Omelyanenko made his Kontinental Hockey League debut and played for Amur Khabarovsk during the 2012–13 Nadezhda Cup.
