= Chris Carrozzi =

Canadian ice hockey player (born 1990)

- Born: March 2, 1990 (age 36) Nepean, Ontario, Canada
- Height: 6 ft 3 in (191 cm)
- Weight: 194 lb (88 kg; 13 st 12 lb)
- Position: Goaltender
- Caught: Left
- Played for: Chicago Wolves; St. John's IceCaps; HC Asiago; Rødovre Mighty Bulls; Guildford Flames
- NHL draft: 154th overall, 2008; Atlanta Thrashers
- Playing career: 2010–2019

Chris Carrozzi (born March 2, 1990) is a Canadian former professional ice hockey goaltender. He last played for English club Guildford Flames of the UK EIHL. Carrozzi was originally selected by the Atlanta Thrashers in the sixth round (154th overall) of the 2008 NHL entry draft while playing major junior hockey with the Mississauga St. Michael's Majors in the Ontario Hockey League (OHL). He grew up in Barrhaven, near Foxfield.

== Career statistics ==
			Regular season									Playoffs
Season	Team	League	GP	W	L	T/OT	MIN	GA	SO	GAA	SV%	GP	W	L	MIN	GA	SO	GAA	SV%
2006–07	Toronto St. Michael's Majors	OHL	25	6	7	2	1130	81	0	4.30	.896	—	—	—	—	—	—	—	—
2007–08	Mississauga St. Michael's Majors	OHL	47	25	18	2	2505	115	4	2.75	.911	4	0	4	240	18	0	4.50	.856
2008–09	Mississauga St. Michael's Majors	OHL	47	27	14	3	2715	133	2	2.94	.908	2	0	0	33	3	0	5.52	.842
2009–10	Mississauga St. Michael's Majors	OHL	37	19	10	5	2089	82	5	2.36	.916	8	5	2	448	16	1	2.14	.928
2010–11	Gwinnett Gladiators	ECHL	47	16	20	6	2544	137	2	3.23	.904	—	—	—	—	—	—	—	—
2010–11	Chicago Wolves	AHL	1	0	0	1	65	6	0	5.55	.778	—	—	—	—	—	—	—	—
2011-12	Ontario Reign	ECHL	29	17	6	4	1609	61	3	2.27	.922	2	1	1	100	6	0	3.60	.882
2011–12	St. John's IceCaps	AHL	2	1	1	0	120	7	0	3.50	.877	—	—	—	—	—	—	—	—
2012–13	Ontario Reign	ECHL	28	19	7	2	1677	77	4	2.75	.887	1	0	0	20	1	0	3.00	.889
2012–13	St. John's IceCaps	AHL	3	1	1	0	150	7	0	2.80	.879	—	—	—	—	—	—	—	—
2013–14	Idaho Steelheads	ECHL	1	0	1	0	60	5	0	5.00	.737	—	—	—	—	—	—	—	—
2014–15	U. of New Brunswick	CIS	5	4	1	—	—	—	—	1.61	.932	—	—	—	—	—	—	—	—
2015–16	HC Asiago	ITL	30	14	12	3	1765	83	1	2.82	.903	—	—	—	—	—	—	—	—
2016–17	Rødovre Mighty Bulls	DEN	41	—	—	—	—	—	—	3.87	.887	—	—	—	—	—	—	—	—
2017–18	Guildford Flames	EIHL	43	25	13	5	2589	119	3	2.76	.911	1	1	0	59	4	0	4.05	.852
2018–19	Guildford Flames	EIHL	34	15	13	5	2035	93	2	2.74	.913	1	0	1	59	3	0	3.00	.889
AHL totals			6	2	2	1	335	20	0	3.58	.859	—	—	—	—	—	—	—	—

== Awards and honours ==
Award	Year
OHL
First All-Star Team	2009–10
ECHL
Goaltender of the Week (Feb. 28 – Mar. 6, 2011)	2011–12
Goaltender of the Week (Oct. 29 – Nov. 4, 2012)	2012–13
