= 2010–11 OHL season =

31st season of the Ontario Hockey League

- League: Ontario Hockey League
- Sport: Hockey
- Duration: Preseason; September 3, 2010 – September 19, 2010; Regular season September 23, 2010 – March 20, 2011; Playoffs; March 24, 2011 – May 15, 2011
- Teams: 20
- TV partner(s): Rogers TV, TVCogeco

Draft
- Top draft pick: Alex Galchenyuk
- Picked by: Sarnia Sting

Regular season
- Hamilton Spectator Trophy: Mississauga St. Michael's Majors (1)
- Season MVP: Ryan Ellis (Windsor Spitfires)
- Top scorer: Tyler Toffoli (Ottawa 67's) & Jason Akeson (Kitchener Rangers)

Playoffs
- Playoffs MVP: Robby Mignardi (Attack)
- Finals champions: Owen Sound Attack (3)
- Runners-up: Mississauga St. Michael's Majors

OHL seasons
- 2009–10 2011–12

2010–11 CHL season
- League: Canadian Hockey League
- Sport: Hockey
- Duration: OHL; Sept. 23, 2010 – Mar. 20, 2011; QMJHL; Sept. 9, 2010 – Mar. 20, 2011; WHL; Sept. 24, 2010 – Mar. 20, 2011
- Teams: 60
- TV partner(s): FSN Northwest; RDS; Rogers Sportsnet; Rogers TV; Shaw TV
- Season MVP: Ryan Ellis (Windsor Spitfires) (OHL)
- Top scorer: Linden Vey (Medicine Hat Tigers) (WHL)

Memorial Cup
- Finals champions: Saint John Sea Dogs (QMJHL) (1st title)
- Runners-up: Mississauga St. Michael's Majors (OHL)

The 2010–11 OHL season was the 31st season of the Ontario Hockey League (OHL). Twenty teams, divided into the Eastern and Western Conferences, played 68 games each during the regular season schedule, which started on September 23, 2010, and ended on March 20, 2011. The playoffs began on March 24, 2011, and ended on May 15, 2011, with the Owen Sound Attack winning the J. Ross Robertson Cup, and a berth in the 2011 Memorial Cup, hosted by the Mississauga St. Michael's Majors of the OHL in Mississauga, Ontario.

== Regular season ==
=== Final standings ===
Note: DIV = Division; GP = Games played; W = Wins; L = Losses; OTL = Overtime losses; SL = Shootout losses; GF = Goals for; GA = Goals against; PTS = Points; x = clinched playoff berth; y = clinched division title; z = clinched conference title

=== Eastern conference ===
Rank	Team	DIV	GP	W	L	OTL	SL	PTS	GF	GA
1	z-Mississauga St. Michael's Majors	Central	68	53	13	0	2	108	287	170
2	y-Ottawa 67's	East	68	44	19	3	2	93	278	199
3	x-Niagara IceDogs	Central	68	45	17	2	4	96	273	197
4	x-Oshawa Generals	East	68	39	19	4	6	88	273	240
5	x-Kingston Frontenacs	East	68	29	30	4	5	67	245	279
6	x-Brampton Battalion	Central	68	29	32	1	6	65	190	214
7	x-Sudbury Wolves	Central	68	29	35	2	2	62	235	276
8	x-Belleville Bulls	East	68	21	43	0	4	46	175	272
9	Peterborough Petes	East	68	20	45	1	2	43	194	298
10	Barrie Colts	Central	68	15	49	2	2	34	231	348

=== Western conference ===
Rank	Team	DIV	GP	W	L	OTL	SL	PTS	GF	GA
1	z-Owen Sound Attack	Midwest	68	46	17	1	4	97	283	215
2	y-Saginaw Spirit	West	68	40	22	4	2	86	243	207
3	x-Kitchener Rangers	Midwest	68	38	21	4	5	85	256	217
4	x-Windsor Spitfires	West	68	39	23	3	3	84	280	247
5	x-Erie Otters	Midwest	68	40	26	1	1	82	281	227
6	x-Plymouth Whalers	West	68	36	26	2	4	78	249	219
7	x-Guelph Storm	Midwest	68	34	27	4	3	75	249	258
8	x-London Knights	Midwest	68	34	29	4	1	73	230	253
9	Sarnia Sting	West	68	25	36	5	2	57	242	321
10	Sault Ste. Marie Greyhounds	West	68	24	36	5	3	56	238	277

=== Scoring leaders ===
Note: GP = Games played; G = Goals; A = Assists; Pts = Points; PIM = Penalty minutes

Player	Team	GP	G	A	Pts	PIM
Tyler Toffoli	Ottawa 67's	68	57	51	108	33
Jason Akeson	Kitchener Rangers	67	24	84	108	23
Ryan Strome	Niagara IceDogs	65	33	73	106	82
Nail Yakupov	Sarnia Sting	65	49	52	101	71
Ryan Ellis	Windsor Spitfires	58	24	77	101	61
Christian Thomas	Oshawa Generals	66	54	45	99	38
Taylor Beck	Guelph Storm	62	42	53	95	60
Greg McKegg	Erie Otters	66	49	43	92	35
Michael Latta	Guelph Storm	68	34	55	89	158
Peter Holland	Guelph Storm	67	37	51	88	57
Kale Kerbashian	Sarnia Sting	68	37	51	88	52
Colin Behenna	Barrie Colts	67	33	55	88	25
Shane Prince	Ottawa 67's	59	25	63	88	18

=== Leading goaltenders ===
Note: GP = Games played; Mins = Minutes played; W = Wins; L = Losses: OTL = Overtime losses; SL = Shootout losses; GA = Goals Allowed; SO = Shutouts; GAA = Goals against average

Player	Team	GP	Mins	W	L	OTL	SL	GA	SO	Sv%	GAA
J.P. Anderson	Mississauga St. Michael's Majors	51	2897	38	10	0	1	114	6	0.911	2.36
Mark Visentin	Niagara IceDogs	46	2714	30	9	2	4	114	4	0.917	2.52
Mike Morrison	Kitchener Rangers	27	1470	15	6	0	3	65	2	0.912	2.65
Cody St. Jacques	Brampton Battalion	26	1569	15	10	1	0	71	1	0.895	2.71
Petr Mrázek	Ottawa 67's	52	3109	33	15	1	2	147	4	0.920	2.84

== Playoffs ==
Conference quarter-finals	Conference Semifinals
1	Mississauga	4
8	Belleville	0
1	Mississauga	4
7	Sudbury	0
2	Ottawa	0
7	Sudbury	4
Eastern
3	Niagara	4
6	Brampton	0
3	Niagara	4
4	Oshawa	1
4	Oshawa	4
5	Kingston	1
1	Owen Sound	4
8	London	2
1	Owen Sound	4
6	Plymouth	0
3	Kitchener	3
6	Plymouth	4
Western
2	Saginaw	4
7	Guelph	2
2	Saginaw	2
4	Windsor	4
4	Windsor	4
5	Erie	3

Conference finals
1	Mississauga	4
3	Niagara	1
1	Owen Sound	4
4	Windsor	1

Finals
E1	Mississauga	3
W1	Owen Sound	4

=== Conference quarterfinals ===
==== Eastern conference ====
===== (1) Mississauga Majors vs. (8) Belleville Bulls =====
March 24	Mississauga St. Michael's Majors	4–1	Belleville Bulls	Hershey Centre	Recap
18:04 - Justin Shugg (1)		First period	No scoring
3:10 - pp - Rob Flick (1); 12:34 - Mika Partanen (1)		Second period	Austen Brassard (1) - 4:13
15:37 - Maxim Kitsyn (1)		Third period	No scoring
J.P. Anderson (17 saves / 18 shots)		Goalie stats	Tyson Teichmann (23 saves / 27 shots)

March 26	Belleville Bulls	0–1	Mississauga St. Michael's Majors	Yardmen Arena	Recap
No scoring		First period	7:18 - Justin Shugg (2)
No scoring		Second period	No scoring
No scoring		Third period	No scoring
Malcolm Subban (28 saves / 29 shots)		Goalie stats	J.P. Anderson (21 saves / 21 shots)

March 27	Mississauga St. Michael's Majors	2–0	Belleville Bulls	Hershey Centre	Recap
No scoring		First period	No scoring
Maxim Kitsyn (2) - pp - 6:11		Second period	No scoring
Riley Brace (1) - en - 19:24		Third period	No scoring
J.P. Anderson (19 saves / 19 shots)		Goalie stats	Malcolm Subban (34 saves / 35 shots)

March 29	Belleville Bulls	0–4	Mississauga St. Michael's Majors	Yardmen Arena	Recap
No scoring		First period	Michael D'Orazio (1) - pp - 17:38
No scoring		Second period	Devante Smith-Pelly (1) - 4:59
No scoring		Third period	Chris DeSousa (1) - 1:15; Maxim Kitsyn (3) - pp - 14:40
Malcolm Subban (22 saves / 26 shots)		Goalie stats	J.P. Anderson (21 saves / 21 shots)

Mississauga wins series 4 – 0

===== (2) Ottawa 67's vs. (7) Sudbury Wolves =====
March 26	Ottawa 67's	7–8	OT	Sudbury Wolves	Rona Centre	Recap
1:03 - pp - Ryan Martindale (1); 19:43 - pp - Tyler Toffoli (1)		First period		Josh Leivo (1) - 11:54
9:19 - sh - Ryan Martindale (2); 11:53 - sh - Tyler Toffoli (2); 12:04 - Thomas Nesbitt (1)		Second period		Josh Leivo (2) - 1:07; Andrey Kuchin (1) - 4:56; Michael McDonald - pp - 11:00
10:47 - Thomas Nesbitt (2); 12:24 - Ryan Martindale (3)		Third period		Michael Sgarbossa (1) - 0:26; Josh Leivo (3) - 3:13; Andrey Kuchin (2) - 3:24
No scoring		First overtime period		Andrey Kuchin (3) - 3:06
Petr Mrázek (21 saves / 28 shots); Shayne Campbell (10 saves / 11 shots)		Goalie stats		Alain Valiquette (41 saves / 48 shots)

March 28	Sudbury Wolves	5–3	Ottawa 67's	Sudbury Arena	Recap
Mike Lomas (1) - 10:02		First period	19:17 - Sean Monahan (1)
Andrey Kuchin (4) - pp - 12:02		Second period	19:51 - sh - Tyler Toffoli (3)
Michael Sgarbossa (2) - 4:26; Charlie Dodero (1) - ps - 5:49; Andrey Kuchin (5) - 17:34		Third period	14:59 - sh - Marc Zanetti (1)
Alain Valiquette (15 saves / 18 shots)		Goalie stats	Petr Mrázek (48 saves / 53 shots)

March 29	Sudbury Wolves	5–4	OT	Ottawa 67's	Sudbury Arena	Recap
11:35 - Eric O'Dell (1); 17:19 - Josh McFadden (1)		First period		Steven Janes (1) - 13:47
No scoring		Second period		Sean Monahan (2) - 4:13; Ben Dubois (1) - 9:38; Marc Zanetti (2) - pp - 10:52
5:20 - pp - Josh McFadden (2); 19:44 - pp - Josh McFadden (3)		Third period		No scoring
0:33 - Mike Lomas (2)		First overtime period		No scoring
Alain Valiquette (31 saves / 35 shots)		Goalie stats		Petr Mrázek (36 saves / 41 shots)

March 31	Ottawa 67's	3–5	Sudbury Wolves	Rona Centre	Recap
Shane Prince (1) - 5:12; Dalton Smith (1) - pp - 17:38		First period	13:58 - sh - Michael Sgarbossa (3)
Dalton Smith (2) - 14:05		Second period	17:10 - sh - Josh Leivo (4)
No scoring		Third period	5:37 - Michael Sgarbossa (4); 6:35 - Josh McFadden (4); 19:53 - en - Eric O'Dell (2)
Petr Mrázek (33 saves / 37 shots)		Goalie stats	Alain Valiquette (34 saves / 37 shots)

Sudbury wins series 4 – 0. Note Game 1 was played at Scotiabank Place

===== (3) Niagara IceDogs vs. (6) Brampton Battalion =====
March 24	Niagara IceDogs	7–1	Brampton Battalion	Gatorade Garden City Complex	Recap
14:28 - Darren Archibald (1)		First period	No scoring
3:45 - Mitchell Theoret (1); 5:55 - pp - Darren Archibald (2); 12:29 - Dougie Hamilton (1); 19:41 - Darren Archibald (3)		Second period	No scoring
9:39 - Darren Archibald (4); 19:54 - pp - Milan Doudera (1)		Third period	Stephon Thorne (1) - 6:28
Mark Visentin (39 saves / 40 shots)		Goalie stats	Cody St. Jacques (9 saves / 13 shots); Matěj Machovský (9 saves / 12 shots)

March 27	Brampton Battalion	0–2	Niagara IceDogs	Powerade Centre	Recap
No scoring		First period	4:20 - Ryan Strome (1)
No scoring		Second period	10:59 - pp - Freddie Hamilton (1)
No scoring		Third period	No scoring
Cody St. Jacques (23 saves / 25 shots)		Goalie stats	Mark Visentin (27 saves / 27 shots)

March 29	Niagara IceDogs	5–1	Brampton Battalion	Gatorade Garden City Complex	Recap
Jason Wilson (1) - 7:03; Freddie Hamilton (2) - 14:37		First period	No scoring
David Pacan (1) - 7:34; Andrew Agozzino (1) - 19:17		Second period	No scoring
Darren Archibald (5) - 16:09		Third period	8:02 - Zach Bell (1)
Mark Visentin (35 saves / 36 shots)		Goalie stats	Cody St. Jacques (30 saves / 35 shots)

March 31	Brampton Battalion	1–4	Niagara IceDogs	Powerade Centre	Recap
No scoring		First period	Johnson Andrews (1) - 4:21; Myles Doan (1) - 15:13
No scoring		Second period	Andrew Agozzino (2) - pp - 0:46; Andrew Agozzino (3) - pp - 3:02
6:52 - Stephon Thorne (2)		Third period	No scoring
Cody St. Jacques (7 saves / 11 shots); Matěj Machovský (13 saves / 13 shots)		Goalie stats	Mark Visentin (28 saves / 29 shots)

Niagara wins series 4 – 0

===== (4) Oshawa Generals vs. (5) Kingston Frontenacs =====
March 24	Oshawa Generals	7–3	Kingston Frontenacs	General Motors Centre	Recap
15:45 - Alain Berger (1); 16:36 - Lucas Lessio (1)		First period	No scoring
0:31 - Daniel Maggio (1); 16:17 - Nicklas Jensen (1)		Second period	No scoring
4:20 - pp - Boone Jenner (1); 11:07 - Alain Berger (2); 18:26 - Boone Jenner (2)		Third period	Mitch Lebar (1) - 10:07; Ryan Spooner (1) - 15:51; Conor Stokes (1) - 18:41
Peter Di Salvo (33 saves / 36 shots)		Goalie stats	Franky Palazzese (23 saves / 27 shots); Nathan Perry (8 saves / 11 shots)

March 25	Kingston Frontenacs	1–10	Oshawa Generals	K-Rock Centre	Recap
Ryan Spooner (2) - pp - 7:27		First period	8:08 - Christian Thomas (1); 9:20 - Alain Berger (3)
No scoring		Second period	0:26 - Nicklas Jensen (2); 7:33 - Lucas Lessio (2); 11:36 - Andy Andreoff (1); 15:32 - pp - Lucas Lessio (3); 16:18 - Alain Berger (4)
No scoring		Third period	1:24 - pp - Christian Thomas (2); 1:42 - J.P. Labardo (1); 15:17 - pp - Cody Payne (1)
Franky Palazzese (15 saves / 22 shots); Nathan Perry (16 saves / 19 shots)		Goalie stats	Peter Di Salvo (25 saves / 26 shots)

March 27	Oshawa Generals	5–4	Kingston Frontenacs	General Motors Centre	Recap
Nicklas Jensen (3) - 10:49		First period	9:57 - pp - Erik Gudbranson (1)
Scott Sabourin (1) - 1:45; Christian Thomas (3) - pp - 6:59; Nicklas Jensen (4) - pp - 8:45		Second period	11:01 - pp - Michael Fine (1)
Andy Andreoff (2) - 0:49		Third period	4:00 - Charles Sarault (1); 18:41 - Sean Jones (1)
Peter Di Salvo (29 saves / 33 shots)		Goalie stats	Nathan Perry (26 saves / 31 shots)

March 29	Kingston Frontenacs	7–4	Oshawa Generals	K-Rock Centre	Recap
12:45 - Mitch Lebar (2); 13:18 - Sean Jones (2)		First period	No scoring
1:14 - Michael Fine (2); 2:10 - Nathan Moon (1); 8:43 - pp - Nathan Moon (2); 15:14 - Ryan Spooner (3)		Second period	Boone Jenner (3) - 10:35; Christian Thomas (4) - ps - 13:35
14:19 - sh - Nathan Moon (3)		Third period	Lucas Lessio (4) - pp - 7:47; Calvin de Haan (1) - pp - 19:00
Nathan Perry (34 saves / 38 shots)		Goalie stats	Peter Di Salvo (23 saves / 28 shots); Kevin Bailie (14 saves / 16 shots)

April 1	Oshawa Generals	6–2	Kingston Frontenacs	General Motors Centre	Recap
1:46 - Christian Thomas (5)		First period	Ryan Spooner (4) - pp - 13:58
1:39 - pp - Boone Jenner (4); 6:37 - pp - Lucas Lessio (5); 18:19 - Scott Valentine (1)		Second period	No scoring
1:04 - pp - Tony DeHart (1); 3:52 - Tony DeHart (2)		Third period	Sean Jones (3) - 4:03
Peter Di Salvo (37 saves / 39 shots)		Goalie stats	Nathan Perry (31 saves / 37 shots)

Oshawa wins series 4 – 1

==== Western conference ====
===== (1) Owen Sound Attack vs. (8) London Knights =====
March 25	Owen Sound Attack	3–2	OT	London Knights	Bayshore Community Centre	Recap
No scoring		First period		Jared Knight (1) - 6:18
6:26 - pp - Robby Mignardi (1); 7:22 - Garrett Wilson (1)		Second period		Stephen Sanza (1) - pp - 10:58
No scoring		Third period		No scoring
1:55 - Garrett Wilson (2)		First overtime period		No scoring
Jordan Binnington (21 saves / 23 shots)		Goalie stats		Michael Houser (49 saves / 52 shots)

March 26	London Knights	5–1	Owen Sound Attack	John Labatt Centre	Recap
Seth Griffith (1) - pp - 0:19		First period	No scoring
Vladislav Namestnikov (1) - 5:00		Second period	7:35 - Roman Berdnikov (1)
Matt Rupert (1) - 6:04; Stephen Sanza (2) - 9:56; Jared Knight (2) - pp - 14:09		Third period	No scoring
Michael Houser (52 saves / 53 shots)		Goalie stats	Jordan Binnington (24 saves / 29 shots)

March 29	Owen Sound Attack	5–3	London Knights	Bayshore Community Centre	Recap
Matt Stanisz (1) - pp - 18:16		First period	9:16 - pp - Seth Griffith (2); 12:57 - pp - Ryan Rupert (1)
Brendan Childerley (1) - 6:46; Joey Hishon (1) - pp - 9:34; Jesse Blacker (1) - 10:57		Second period	0:26 - pp - Ryan Rupert (2)
Liam Heelis (1) - pp - en - 19:21		Third period	No scoring
Jordan Binnington (17 saves / 20 shots)		Goalie stats	Michael Houser (37 saves / 41 shots); Igor Bobkov (0 saves / 0 shots)

March 31	London Knights	5–2	Owen Sound Attack	John Labatt Centre	Recap
No scoring		First period	Keevin Cutting (1) - 13:07
3:57 - Jared Knight (3); 7:16 - Dane Fox (1); 19:58 - pp - Matt Rupert (2)		Second period	No scoring
1:17 - Jared Knight (4); 8:02 - pp - Seth Griffith (3)		Third period	Brendan Childerley (2) - 11:20
Michael Houser (35 saves / 37 shots); Igor Bobkov (1 save / 1 shot)		Goalie stats	Jordan Binnington (38 saves / 43 shots); Michael Zador (7 saves / 7 shots)

April 2	Owen Sound Attack	6–0	London Knights	Bayshore Community Centre	Recap
No scoring		First period	No scoring
2:19 - Gemel Smith (1); 6:12 - Garrett Wilson (3); 13:08 - pp - Robby Mignardi (2); 13:44 - Liam Heelis (2)		Second period	No scoring
0:29 - Robby Mignardi (3); 3:21 - Andrew Shaw (1)		Third period	No scoring
Michael Zador (13 saves / 13 shots); Scott Stajcer (1 save / 1 shot)		Goalie stats	Michael Houser (24 saves / 28 shots); Igor Bobkov (14 saves / 16 shots)

April 3	London Knights	0–1	Owen Sound Attack	John Labatt Centre	Recap
No scoring		First period	No scoring
No scoring		Second period	No scoring
No scoring		Third period	Robby Mignardi (4) - 18:19
Michael Houser (38 saves / 39 shots)		Goalie stats	Michael Zador (23 saves / 23 shots)

Owen Sound wins series 4 – 2

===== (2) Saginaw Spirit vs. (7) Guelph Storm =====
March 25	Saginaw Spirit	3–2	Guelph Storm	Dow Event Center	Recap
6:21 - pp - Ryan O'Connor (1)		First period	Taylor Beck (1) - 3:29
No scoring		Second period	Francis Menard (1) - 16:22
9:03 - Josh Shalla (1); 11:21 - Vincent Trocheck (1)		Third period	No scoring
Mavric Parks (38 saves / 40 shots)		Goalie stats	Brandon Foote (32 saves / 35 shots)

March 27	Guelph Storm	6–2	Saginaw Spirit	Sleeman Centre	Recap
Cody McNaughton (1) - 7:47; Richard Pánik (1) - pp - 15:49; Daniel Erlich (1) - pp - 16:23		First period	19:51 - pp - Josh Shalla (2)
Sam Lofquist (1) - 4:03; Zack Mitchell (1) - pp - 11:30		Second period	8:28 - pp - Josh Shalla (3)
Tyler Carroll (1) - pp - 7:21		Third period	No scoring
Brandon Foote (32 saves / 34 shots		Goalie stats	Mavric Parks (27 saves / 33 shots)

March 28	Saginaw Spirit	3–7	Guelph Storm	Dow Event Center	Recap
John McFarland (1) - 4:11; Micky Sartoretto (1) - 8:22		First period	1:49 - Taylor Beck (2); 10:39 - pp - Michael Latta (1)
No scoring		Second period	2:51 - pp - Taylor Beck (3); 10:52 - Daniel Erlich (2); 15:43 - Sam Lofquist (2)
Ryan O'Connor (2) - 2:01		Third period	6:10 - pp - Michael Latta (2); 15:53 - pp - Peter Holland (1)
Mavric Parks (14 saves / 19 shots); Tadeáš Galanský (14 saves / 16 shots)		Goalie stats	Brandon Foote (37 saves / 40 shots)

March 31	Guelph Storm	3–4	Saginaw Spirit	Sleeman Centre	Recap
2:22 - Francis Menard (2); 4:52 - Kyle Pereira (1)		First period	No scoring
No scoring		Second period	Jordan Szwarz (1) - sh - 3:39; Brad Walch (1) - 5:31; John McFarland (2) - pp - 16:28; Josh Shalla (4) - pp - 16:51
9:30 - pp - Francis Menard (3)		Third period	No scoring
Brandon Foote (26 saves / 30 shots)		Goalie stats	Mavric Parks (30 saves / 33 shots)

April 2	Saginaw Spirit	5–4	Guelph Storm	Dow Event Center	Recap
17:44 - pp - John McFarland (3)		First period	Peter Holland (2) - 7:42
4:36 - Jordan Szwarz (2); 17:31 - pp - Josh Shalla (5)		Second period	Francis Menard (4) - 7:07; Scott Kosmachuk (1) - 10:34
5:16 - Jordan Szwarz (3); 11:46 - Vincent Trocheck (2)		Third period	Daniel Erlich (3) - 9:05
Mavric Parks (29 saves / 33 shots)		Goalie stats	Brandon Foote (26 saves / 31 shots)

April 3	Guelph Storm	5–6	Saginaw Spirit	Sleeman Centre	Recap
4:35 - pp - Michael Latta (3); 17:26 - Michael Latta (4)		First period	Vincent Trocheck (3) - 14:37; Brandon Saad (1) - 19:54
No scoring		Second period	Jordan Szwarz (4) - pp - 7:20; Dalton Prout (1) - 11:28; Ivan Telegin (1) - 15:11
7:57 - Sam Lofquist (3); 13:25 - pp - Peter Holland (3); 18:04 - pp - Michael Latta (5)		Third period	Vincent Trocheck (4) - 3:46
Brandon Foote (24 saves / 30 shots)		Goalie stats	Mavric Parks (33 saves / 38 shots)

Saginaw wins series 4 – 2

===== (3) Kitchener Rangers vs. (6) Plymouth Whalers =====
March 25	Kitchener Rangers	5–6	Plymouth Whalers	Kitchener Memorial Auditorium	Recap
0:33 - Matthew Tipoff (1)		First period	Jamie Devane (1) - 12:07
8:58 - pp - Matthew Tipoff (2); 14:22 - Michael Catenacci (1); 16:39 - Gabriel Landeskog (1)		Second period	Beau Schmitz (1) - 6:30; Stefan Noesen (1) - pp - 9:54; Garrett Meurs (1) - 15:40
12:21 - pp - Gabriel Landeskog (2)		Third period	Dario Trutmann (1) - 5:21; Tyler Brown (1) - 10:33
Brandon Maxwell (24 saves / 30 shots)		Goalie stats	Scott Wedgewood (46 saves / 51 shots)

March 26	Plymouth Whalers	3–2	OT	Kitchener Rangers	Compuware Arena	Recap
No scoring		First period		No scoring
No scoring		Second period		9:14 - pp - Jerry D'Amigo (1)
Tyler Brown (2) - sh - 13:42; Mitchell Heard (1) - 15:04		Third period		9:02 - Jerry D'Amigo (2)
Robbie Czarnik (1) - 2:23		First overtime period		No scoring
Scott Wedgewood (29 saves / 31 shots)		Goalie stats		Brandon Maxwell (35 saves / 38 shots)

March 28	Kitchener Rangers	3–1	Plymouth Whalers	Kitchener Memorial Auditorium	Recap
No scoring		First period	No scoring
Jerry D'Amigo (3) - 7:40		Second period	13:30 - Alex Aleardi (1)
Ryan Murphy (1) - pp - 1:00; Gabriel Landeskog (3) - en - 19:24		Third period	No scoring
Brandon Maxwell (35 saves / 36 shots)		Goalie stats	Scott Wedgewood (45 saves / 47 shots)

March 30	Plymouth Whalers	6–5	OT	Kitchener Rangers	Compuware Arena	Recap
No scoring		First period		Andrew Crescenzi (1) - 7:46
1:22 - Stefan Noesen (2); 19:55 - R.J. Mahalak (1)		Second period		Gabriel Landeskog (4) - sh - 8:22; Jamie Doornbosch (1) - 19:21; Michael Catenacci (2) - 19:36
6:00 - Austin Levi (1); 18:15 - James Livingston (1); 19:52 - Jamie Devane (2)		Third period		Gabriel Landeskog (5) - 7:03
13:23 - pp - Stefan Noesen (3)		First overtime period		No scoring
Scott Wedgewood (52 saves / 57 shots)		Goalie stats		Brandon Maxwell (37 saves / 43 shots)

April 1	Kitchener Rangers	6–4	Plymouth Whalers	Kitchener Memorial Auditorium	Recap
2:25 - Michael Catenacci (3)		First period	Robbie Czarnik (2) - 0:09
3:08 - Jason Akeson (1)		Second period	Stefan Noesen (4) - pp - 16:21
12:06 - Jason Akeson (2); 13:09 - Jerry D'Amigo (4); 15:30 - Michael Catenacci (4); 19:55 - en - Jason Akeson (3)		Third period	Robbie Czarnik (3) - 0:34; Alex Aleardi (2) - 19:28
Mike Morrison (39 saves / 43 shots)		Goalie stats	Scott Wedgewood (41 saves / 46 shots)

April 2	Plymouth Whalers	0–2	Kitchener Rangers	Compuware Arena	Recap
No scoring		First period	No scoring
No scoring		Second period	Ryan Murphy (2) - pp - 7:06
No scoring		Third period	Jerry D'Amigo (5) - en - 19:49
Scott Wedgewood (35 saves / 36 shots)		Goalie stats	Mike Morrison (40 saves / 40 shots)

April 4	Kitchener Rangers	2–4	Plymouth Whalers	Kitchener Memorial Auditorium	Recap
No scoring		First period	No scoring
No scoring		Second period	Michael Whaley (1) - 9:21; Robbie Czarnik (4) - 14:51
5:17 - pp - Gabriel Landeskog (6); 14:01 - Jerry D'Amigo (6)		Third period	James Livingston (2) - 16:56; Tyler Brown (3) - sh - en - 19:58
Mike Morrison (29 saves / 32 shots)		Goalie stats	Scott Wedgewood (37 saves / 39 shots)

Plymouth wins series 4 – 3

===== (4) Windsor Spitfires vs. (5) Erie Otters =====
March 24	Windsor Spitfires	1–2	Erie Otters	WFCU Centre	Recap
No scoring		First period	Phil Varone (1) - sh - 15:11
3:10 - pp - Stephen Johnston (1)		Second period	Anthony Luciani (1) - 1:20
No scoring		Third period	No scoring
Jack Campbell (35 saves / 37 shots)		Goalie stats	Ramis Sadikov (40 saves / 41 shots)

March 26	Erie Otters	3–4	2OT	Windsor Spitfires	Tullio Arena	Recap
Mike Cazzola (1) - pp - 10:29; Greg McKegg (1) - 17:36		First period		16:17 - Jake Carrick (1); 18:52 - Ryan Ellis (1)
No scoring		Second period		4:57 - Jeff Brown (1)
Shawn Szydlowski (1) - 6:23		Third period		No scoring
No scoring		Second overtime period		11:09 - Jeff Brown (2)
Ramis Sadikov (45 saves / 49 shots)		Goalie stats		Jack Campbell (40 saves / 43 shots)

March 28	Windsor Spitfires	6–2	Erie Otters	WFCU Centre	Recap
Stephen Johnston (2) - pp - 15:18; Jake Carrick (2) - pp - 18:20		First period	15:44 - Mike Cazzola (2)
Ryan Ellis (2) - 17:12		Second period	15:06 - pp - Shawn Szydlowski (2)
Taylor Carnevale (1) - 1:14; Brady Vail (1) - 1:46; Kenny Ryan (1) - 2:16		Third period	No scoring
Jack Campbell (30 saves / 32 shots)		Goalie stats	Ramis Sadikov (28 saves / 33 shots); Christopher Festarini (6 saves / 7 shots)

March 30	Erie Otters	4–7	Windsor Spitfires	Tullio Arena	Recap
8:27 - Tyler Hostetter (1); 15:45 - David Shields (1)		First period	Tom Kühnhackl (1) - 1:27; Alexander Khokhlachev (1) - 3:52; Stephen Johnston (3) - pp - 12:54
4:56 - Greg McKegg (2)		Second period	Zack Kassian (1) - 0:47; Tom Kühnhackl (2) - pp - 8:33; Jake Carrick (3) - 13:34
5:01 - pp - Mike Cazzola (3)		Third period	Alexander Khokhlachev (2) - 6:50
Ramis Sadikov (32 saves / 37 shots); Christopher Festarini (9 saves / 11 shots)		Goalie stats	Jack Campbell (22 saves / 26 shots)

April 1	Windsor Spitfires	5–6	OT	Erie Otters	WFCU Centre	Recap
No scoring		First period		Anthony Luciani (2) - 7:11
3:34 - Adrian Robertson (1)		Second period		Phil Varone (2) - pp - 8:55; Derek Holden (1) - pp - 11:15; Anthony Luciani (3) - pp - 16:00
4:41 - pp - Alexander Khokhlachev (3); 9:03 - Kerby Rychel (1); 16:10 - Jake Carrick (4); 16:51 - Ryan Ellis (3)		Third period		Anthony Luciani (4) - 5:51
No scoring		First overtime period		Anthony Luciani (5) - 4:03
Jack Campbell (25 saves / 31 shots)		Goalie stats		Ramis Sadikov (50 saves / 55 shots)

April 3	Erie Otters	6–5	OT	Windsor Spitfires	Tullio Arena	Recap
No scoring		First period		Tom Kühnhackl (3) - 8:32; Taylor Carnevale (2) - 14:51; Taylor Carnevale (3) - 17:22
3:29 - Anthony Luciani (6); 3:55 - Brett Cook (1); 18:53 - Anthony Luciani (7)		Second period		Stephen Johnston (4) - 4:27
6:49 - pp - Phil Varone; 10:56 - Derek Holden (2)		Third period		Adrian Robertson (2) - 16:01
8:51 - Brett Thompson (1)		First overtime period		No scoring
Ramis Sadikov (48 saves / 53 shots)		Goalie stats		Jack Campbell (61 saves / 67 shots)

April 5	Windsor Spitfires	5–4	Erie Otters	WFCU Centre	Recap
3:06 - Alexander Khokhlachev (4); 9:33 - Tom Kühnhackl (4)		First period	Derek Holden (3) - 1:46
12:30 - pp - Ryan Ellis (4); 15:48 - Taylor Carnevale (4)		Second period	Greg McKegg (3) - 5:59
17:12 - Tom Kühnhackl (5)		Third period	Greg McKegg (4) - 1:05; Tyler Hostetter (2) - 8:23
Jack Campbell (25 saves / 29 shots)		Goalie stats	Ramis Sadikov (42 saves / 47 shots)

Windsor wins series 4 – 3

=== Conference semifinals ===
==== Eastern conference ====
===== (1) Mississauga Majors vs. (7) Sudbury Wolves =====
April 8	Mississauga St. Michael's Majors	8–5	Sudbury Wolves	Hershey Centre	Recap
11:42 - Devante Smith-Pelly (2); 13:32 - Casey Cizikas (1); 19:52 - Jordan Mayer (1)		First period	No scoring
2:21 - Devante Smith-Pelly (3); 3:26 - sh - Corey Bureau (1); 10:24 - pp - Maxim Kitsyn (4); 11:56 - pp - Riley Brace (2); 12:43 - Chris DeSousa (2)		Second period	Michael Sgarbossa (5) - 13:24; Mike Lomas (3) - 19:16
No scoring		Third period	Eric O'Dell (3) - 1:56; Josh Leivo (5) - pp - 4:55; Eric O'Dell (4) - 10:09
J.P. Anderson (25 saves / 30 shots)		Goalie stats	Alain Valiquette (32 saves / 37 shots); Jacob Riley (4 saves / 7 shots)

April 10	Sudbury Wolves	2–3	Mississauga St. Michael's Majors	Sudbury Arena	Recap
No scoring		First period	No scoring
Marcus Foligno (1) - pp - 0:23; Eric O'Dell (5) - sh - 15:42		Second period	16:59 - Justin Shugg (3)
No scoring		Third period	9:44 - Stuart Percy (1); 14:58 - Mika Partanen (2)
Alain Valiquette (60 saves / 63 shots)		Goalie stats	J.P. Anderson (22 saves / 24 shots)

April 12	Mississauga St. Michael's Majors	6–3	Sudbury Wolves	Hershey Centre	Recap
Jordan Mayer (2) - 5:31; Jordan Mayer (3) - 12:27		First period	No scoring
Rob Flick (2) - 3:51; Justin Shugg (4) - 13:21		Second period	5:21 - Frank Schumacher (1); 12:05 - Eric O'Dell (6)
Maxim Kitsyn (5) - 11:25; Corey Bureau (2) - 19:23		Third period	1:28 - Josh Leivo (6)
J.P. Anderson (18 saves / 21 shots)		Goalie stats	Alain Valiquette (39 saves / 44 shots)

April 13	Sudbury Wolves	3–4	OT	Mississauga St. Michael's Majors	Sudbury Arena	Recap
No scoring		First period		No scoring
7:38 - Eric O'Dell (7); 16:43 - pp - Marcus Foligno (2)		Second period		No scoring
8:41 - Frank Corrado (1)		Third period		Rob Flick (3) - 10:47; Casey Cizikas (2) - 14:45; Devante Smith-Pelly (4) - pp - 18:09
No scoring		First overtime period		Derek Schoenmakers (1) - 2:20
Alain Valiquette (42 saves / 46 shots)		Goalie stats		J.P. Anderson (20 saves / 23 shots)

Mississauga wins series 4 – 0

===== (3) Niagara IceDogs vs. (4) Oshawa Generals =====
April 7	Niagara IceDogs	2–1	Oshawa Generals	Gatorade Garden City Complex	Recap
14:49 - Ryan Strome (2)		First period	No scoring
14:08 - pp - Jason Wilson (2)		Second period	Nicklas Jensen (5) - 10:09
No scoring		Third period	No scoring
Mark Visentin (37 saves / 38 shots)		Goalie stats	Peter Di Salvo (33 saves / 35 shots)

April 9	Oshawa Generals	6–4	Niagara IceDogs	General Motors Centre	Recap
Alain Berger (5) - pp - 5:36; Christian Thomas (6) - pp - 9:38		First period	2:43 - Alex Friesen (1); 10:58 - pp - Ryan Strome (3)
Nicklas Jensen (6) - pp - 11:00		Second period	11:40 - Darren Archibald (6)
Nicklas Jensen (7) - 7:00; Boone Jenner (5) - 8:30; Christian Thomas (7) - 12:45		Third period	6:15 - Mitchell Theoret (2)
Peter Di Salvo (37 saves / 41 shots)		Goalie stats	Mark Visentin (28 saves / 34 shots)

April 11	Niagara IceDogs	5–3	Oshawa Generals	Gatorade Garden City Complex	Recap
Ryan Strome (4) - 1:03; Simon Gronvaldt (1) - 2:22; Andrew Agozzino (4) - pp - 10:06; Darren Archibald (7) - 18:55		First period	No scoring
No scoring		Second period	19:53 - ps - Andy Andreoff (3)
Andrew Agozzino (5) - en - 19:51		Third period	13:01 - Scott Laughton (1); 19:13 - pp - Boone Jenner (6)
Mark Visentin (46 saves / 49 shots)		Goalie stats	Peter Di Salvo (28 saves / 32 shots)

April 13	Oshawa Generals	1–6	Niagara IceDogs	General Motors Centre	Recap
No scoring		First period	Jason Wilson (3) - 5:52; Jason Wilson (4) - pp - 9:28
No scoring		Second period	Dougie Hamilton (2) - pp - 11:29
4:09 - Christian Thomas (8)		Third period	Darren Archibald (8) - 4:47; Ryan Strome (5) - 6:23; Dougie Hamilton (3) - pp - 18:40
Peter Di Salvo (30 saves / 36 shots)		Goalie stats	Mark Visentin (30 saves / 31 shots)

April 15	Niagara IceDogs	7–3	Oshawa Generals	Gatorade Garden City Complex	Recap
0:40 - Darren Archibald (9); 3:22 - pp - Darren Archibald (10); 10:33 - Steven Shipley (1); 14:36 - Ryan Strome (6); 17:02 - pp - David Pacan (2)		First period	Josh Graves (1) - 8:58; Christian Thomas (9) - pp - 17:48
No scoring		Second period	Boone Jenner (7) - 15:05
11:45 - pp - Andrew Agozzino (6); 15:08 - David Pacan (3)		Third period	No scoring
Mark Visentin (34 saves / 37 shots)		Goalie stats	Peter Di Salvo (27 saves / 34 shots)

Niagara wins series 4 – 1

==== Western conference ====
===== (1) Owen Sound Attack vs. (6) Plymouth Whalers =====
April 7	Owen Sound Attack	4–3	OT	Plymouth Whalers	Bayshore Community Centre	Recap
8:19 - Roman Berdnikov (2)		First period		James Livingston (3) - pp - 10:00
10:44 - Liam Heelis (3)		Second period		Beau Schmitz (2) - pp - 2:36; Stefan Noesen (5) - 9:43
11:09 - Garrett Wilson (4)		Third period		No scoring
14:45 - Jesse Blacker (2)		First overtime period		No scoring
Michael Zador (20 saves / 23 shots); Scott Stajcer (14 saves / 14 shots)		Goalie stats		Scott Wedgewood (54 saves / 58 shots)

April 9	Plymouth Whalers	2–3	Owen Sound Attack	Compuware Arena	Recap
Colin MacDonald (1) - 13:51		First period	No scoring
Stefan Noesen (6) - 17:02		Second period	18:00 - Andrew Shaw (2); 18:52 - Liam Heelis (4)
No scoring		Third period	4:31 - Roman Berdnikov (3)
Scott Wedgewood (28 saves / 31 shots)		Goalie stats	Scott Stajcer (29 saves / 31 shots)

April 11	Owen Sound Attack	4–1	Plymouth Whalers	Bayshore Community Centre	Recap
Robby Mignardi (5) - 7:55		First period	No scoring
Andrew Shaw (3) - 9:44; Robby Mignardi (6) - pp - 12:22; Jarrod Maidens (1) - 19:02		Second period	No scoring
No scoring		Third period	6:39 - R.J. Mahalak (2)
Scott Stajcer (25 saves / 26 shots)		Goalie stats	Scott Wedgewood (30 saves / 34 shots); Matt Mahalak (9 saves / 9 shots)

April 13	Plymouth Whalers	1–4	Owen Sound Attack	Compuware Arena	Recap
No scoring		First period	Brendan Childerley (3) - 9:40; Cameron Brace (1) - 14:49
No scoring		Second period	Roman Berdnikov (4) - 19:37
18:55 - James Livingston (4)		Third period	Jesse Blacker (3) - pp - 0:53
Matt Mahalak (33 saves / 37 shots)		Goalie stats	Scott Stajcer (36 saves / 37 shots)

Owen Sound wins series 4 – 0

===== (2) Saginaw Spirit vs. (4) Windsor Spitfires =====
April 8	Saginaw Spirit	0–3	Windsor Spitfires	Dow Event Center	Recap
No scoring		First period	No scoring
No scoring		Second period	Stephen Johnston (5) - 14:06; Nick Ebert (1) - pp - 18:43
No scoring		Third period	Kenny Ryan (2) - 10:24
Mavric Parks (40 saves / 43 shots)		Goalie stats	Jack Campbell (28 saves / 28 shots)

April 10	Windsor Spitfires	4–5	OT	Saginaw Spirit	WFCU Centre	Recap
Stephen Johnston (6) - 1:13; Tom Kühnhackl (6) - 4:32		First period		5:48 - John McFarland (4); 16:55 - pp - Ben Chiarot (1)
Tom Kühnhackl (7) - 4:57; Jake Carrick (5) - 7:25		Second period		12:51 - Garret Ross (1)
No scoring		Third period		9:28 - Brandon Saad (2)
No scoring		First overtime period		2:13 - Josh Shalla (6)
Jack Campbell (29 saves / 34 shots)		Goalie stats		Mavric Parks (29 saves / 33 shots)

April 12	Saginaw Spirit	5–2	Windsor Spitfires	Dow Event Center	Recap
Garret Ross (2) - 3:34; Josh Shalla (7) - 9:04; Garret Ross (3) - 19:16		First period	No scoring
Vincent Trocheck (5) - 9:50		Second period	14:09 - Zack Kassian (2)
Ivan Telegin (2) - pp - 13:39		Third period	12:52 - Alexander Khokhlachev (5)
Mavric Parks (29 saves / 31 shots)		Goalie stats	Jack Campbell (24 saves / 29 shots)

April 14	Windsor Spitfires	6–2	Saginaw Spirit	WFCU Centre	Recap
4:40 - pp - Ryan Ellis (5); 8:30 - Alexander Khokhlachev (6); 12:37 - Jeff Brown (3); 16:33 - Kenny Ryan (3)		First period	No scoring
13:06 - pp - Jake Carrick (6)		Second period	Josh Shalla (8) - pp - 3:40
10:32 - Jake Carrick (7)		Third period	John McFarland (5) - 10:11
Jack Campbell (29 saves / 31 shots)		Goalie stats	Mavric Parks (27 saves / 33 shots)

April 16	Saginaw Spirit	3–5	Windsor Spitfires	Dow Event Center	Recap
0:44 - Brandon Saad (3); 9:25 - pp - Vincent Trocheck (6)		First period	No scoring
13:06 - pp - Dalton Prout (2)		Second period	Jake Carrick (8) - 10:29; Jake Carrick (9) - 13:33; Taylor Carnevale (5) - 19:15
No scoring		Third period	Ryan Ellis (6) - 16:06; Kenny Ryan (4) - en - 19:42
Mavric Parks (27 saves / 31 shots)		Goalie stats	Jack Campbell (26 saves / 29 shots)

April 17	Windsor Spitfires	5–0	Saginaw Spirit	WFCU Centre	Recap
7:19 - pp - Alexander Khokhlachev (7); 19:17 - pp - Zack Kassian (3)		First period	No scoring
8:58 - Zack Kassian (4); 14:39 - Jeff Brown (4)		Second period	No scoring
6:31 - Zack Kassian (5)		Third period	No scoring
Jack Campbell (25 saves / 25 shots)		Goalie stats	Mavric Parks (33 saves / 38 shots)

Windsor wins series 4 – 2

=== Conference finals ===
==== Eastern conference ====
===== (1) Mississauga Majors vs. (3) Niagara IceDogs =====
April 19	Mississauga St. Michael's Majors	3–0	Niagara IceDogs	Hershey Centre	Recap
0:48 - Jordan Mayer (4); 14:17 - Devante Smith-Pelly (5)		First period	No scoring
7:31 - Jamie Wise (1)		Second period	No scoring
No scoring		Third period	No scoring
J.P. Anderson (23 saves / 23 shots)		Goalie stats	Mark Visentin (28 saves / 31 shots)

April 21	Niagara IceDogs	5–3	Mississauga St. Michael's Majors	Gatorade Garden City Complex	Recap
David Pacan (4) - 8:27		First period	19:55 - Riley Brace (3)
Jesse Graham (1) - 11:29; Jason Wilson (5) - 14:08		Second period	3:38 - Jordan Mayer (5)
Freddie Hamilton (3) - pp - 10:11; David Pacan (5) - en - 19:18		Third period	18:53 - Rob Flick (4)
Mark Visentin (32 saves / 35 shots)		Goalie stats	J.P. Anderson (33 saves / 37 shots)

April 23	Mississauga St. Michael's Majors	3–2	OT	Niagara IceDogs	Hershey Centre	Recap
No scoring		First period		7:46 - Alex Friesen (2)
Maxim Kitsyn (6) - pp - 18:08		Second period		12:11 - Freddie Hamilton (4)
Rob Flick (5) - 14:01		Third period		No scoring
Justin Shugg (5) - 3:13		First overtime period		No scoring
J.P. Anderson (22 saves / 24 shots)		Goalie stats		Mark Visentin (42 saves / 45 shots)

April 25	Niagara IceDogs	1–6	Mississauga St. Michael's Majors	Gatorade Garden City Complex	Recap
15:09 - Johnson Andrews (2)		First period	Joseph Cramarossa (1) - 5:53
No scoring		Second period	Devante Smith-Pelly (6) - pp - 5:38; Joseph Cramarossa (2) - sh - 6:40; Riley Brace (4) - 15:51; Devante Smith-Pelly (7) - 16:14
No scoring		Third period	Jamie Wise (2) - pp - 17:53
Mark Visentin (22 saves / 27 shots); Dalton McGrath (5 saves / 6 shots)		Goalie stats	J.P. Anderson (31 saves / 32 shots)

April 26	Mississauga St. Michael's Majors	4–1	Niagara IceDogs	Hershey Centre	Recap
No scoring		First period	No scoring
6:47 - Casey Cizikas (3); 15:46 - Rob Flick (6); 16:23 - Dylan DeMelo (1)		Second period	Dougie Hamilton (4) - pp - 10:43
1:10 - Maxim Kitsyn (7)		Third period	No scoring
J.P. Anderson (26 saves / 27 shots)		Goalie stats	Mark Visentin (30 saves / 34 shots)

Mississauga wins series 4 – 1

==== Western conference ====
===== (1) Owen Sound Attack vs. (4) Windsor Spitfires =====
April 19	Owen Sound Attack	8–1	Windsor Spitfires	Bayshore Community Centre	Recap
14:17 - Jarrod Maidens (2); 19:41 - sh - Joey Hishon		First period	No scoring
7:01 - Andrew Shaw (4); 10:24 - pp - Joey Hishon (3); 14:47 - pp - Garrett Wilson (5); 15:49 - Brendan Childerley (4); 19:39 - Andrew Shaw (5)		Second period	Adrian Robertson (3) - pp - 6:39
10:36 - pp - Roman Berdnikov (5)		Third period	No scoring
Scott Stajcer (38 saves / 39 shots); Jordan Binnington (0 saves / 0 shots)		Goalie stats	Jack Campbell (25 saves / 33 shots)

April 21	Windsor Spitfires	4–2	Owen Sound Attack	WFCU Centre	Recap
Tom Kühnhackl (8) - pp - 0:43		First period	19:50 - Robby Mignardi (7)
Kerby Rychel (2) - 16:14		Second period	8:07 - pp - Jesse Blacker (4)
Zack Kassian (6) - 1:49; Tom Kühnhackl (9) - en - 19:21		Third period	No scoring
Jack Campbell (33 saves / 35 shots)		Goalie stats	Scott Stajcer (19 saves / 22 shots)

April 23	Owen Sound Attack	6–4	Windsor Spitfires	Bayshore Community Centre	Recap
Andrew Shaw (6) - 6:58; Mike Halmo (1) - 11:01		First period	9:44 - sh - Craig Duininck (1)
Liam Heelis (5) - 3:25		Second period	1:14 - Jeff Brown (5); 4:46 - pp - Zack MacQueen (1)
Garrett Wilson (6) - pp - 15:27; Garrett Wilson (7) - pp - 16:56; Robby Mignardi (8) - en - 19:42		Third period	4:17 - Alexander Khokhlachev (8)
Scott Stajcer (17 saves / 21 shots)		Goalie stats	Jack Campbell (28 saves / 33 shots)

April 25	Windsor Spitfires	2–3	Owen Sound Attack	WFCU Centre	Recap
15:59 - pp - Tom Kühnhackl (10)		First period	Robby Mignardi (9) - pp - 6:36
No scoring		Second period	No scoring
17:23 - pp - Tom Kühnhackl (11)		Third period	Garrett Wilson (8) - 2:52; Roman Berdnikov (6) - 10:24
Jack Campbell (41 saves / 44 shots)		Goalie stats	Scott Stajcer (28 saves / 30 shots)

April 27	Owen Sound Attack	10–4	Windsor Spitfires	Bayshore Community Centre	Recap
5:31 - Matt Petgrave (1); 12:27 - Joey Hishon (4)		First period	Alexander Khokhlachev (9) - 2:12; Brady Vail (2) - 9:38
14:41 - Matt Petgrave (2); 19:44 - pp - Matt Petgrave (3)		Second period	No scoring
4:32 - Mike Halmo (2); 5:48 - Garrett Wilson (9); 7:11 - Andrew Shaw (7); 11:03 - pp - Andrew Shaw (8); 15:31 - pp - Mike Halmo (3); 16:22 - pp - Jarrod Maidens (3)		Third period	Brady Vail (3) - 6:02; Brady Vail (4) - sh - 17:06
Scott Stajcer (34 saves / 38 shots)		Goalie stats	Jack Campbell (25 saves / 35 shots)

Owen Sound wins series 4 – 1

=== J. Ross Robertson Cup ===
==== (E1) Mississauga Majors vs. (W1) Owen Sound Attack ====
May 3	Mississauga St. Michael's Majors	5–2	Owen Sound Attack	Hershey Centre	Recap
3:54 - pp - Devante Smith-Pelly (8)		First period	Robby Mignardi (10) - pp - 6:11
4:27 - Devante Smith-Pelly (9); 14:00 - Casey Cizikas (4); 14:43 - Chris DeSousa (3)		Second period	No scoring
19:47 - en - Jordan Mayer (6)		Third period	Robby Mignardi (11) - pp - 1:36
J. P. Anderson (27 saves / 29 shots)		Goalie stats	Scott Stajcer (23 saves / 27 shots)

May 5	Owen Sound Attack	2–6	Mississauga St. Michael's Majors	Bayshore Community Centre	Recap
Robby Mignardi (12) - 9:21; Jesse Blacker (5) - pp - 9:45		First period	1:25 - pp - Justin Shugg (6); 7:56 - pp - Jordan Mayer (7)
No scoring		Second period	0:42 - Justin Shugg (7); 6:49 - pp - Jordan Mayer (8)
No scoring		Third period	9:41 - pp - Casey Cizikas (5); 19:36 - en - Chris DeSousa (4)
Scott Stajcer (33 saves / 38 shots)		Goalie stats	J. P. Anderson (25 saves / 27 shots)

May 6	Mississauga St. Michael's Majors	5–6	OT	Owen Sound Attack	Hershey Centre	Recap
Rob Flick (7) - pp - 9:21; Maxim Kitsyn (8) - pp - 12:29; Devante Smith-Pelly (10) - pp - 14:24		First period		5:17 - Andrew Shaw (9); 13:29 - sh - Robby Mignardi (13); 18:56 - pp - Garrett Wilson (10)
No scoring		Second period		11:20 - Andrew Shaw (10); 13:38 - pp - Mike Halmo (4)
Brett Flemming (1) - 1:37; Devante Smith-Pelly (11) - 14:38		Third period		No scoring
No scoring		First overtime period		0:56 - Matt Petgrave (4)
J. P. Anderson (21 saves / 27 shots)		Goalie stats		Michael Zador (32 saves / 37 shots)

May 8	Owen Sound Attack	2–1	OT	Mississauga St. Michael's Majors	Bayshore Community Centre	Recap
No scoring		First period		No scoring
No scoring		Second period		No scoring
16:16 - pp - Robby Mignardi (14)		Third period		Justin Shugg (8) - 15:21
16:00 - Cameron Brace (2)		First overtime period		No scoring
Michael Zador (41 saves / 42 shots)		Goalie stats		J. P. Anderson (38 saves / 40 shots)

May 10	Mississauga St. Michael's Majors	7–3	Owen Sound Attack	Hershey Centre	Recap
6:57 - Rob Flick (8); 9:01 - pp - Justin Shugg (9); 12:25 - pp - Maxim Kitsyn (9); 15:46 - Devante Smith-Pelly (12)		First period	Jarrod Maidens (4) - 17:06; Keevin Cutting (2) - 19:08
No scoring		Second period	No scoring
11:46 - Justin Shugg (10); 14:49 - pp - Devante Smith-Pelly (13); 16:17 - pp - Devante Smith-Pelly (14)		Third period	Robby Mignardi (15) - pp - 1:19
J. P. Anderson (27 saves / 30 shots)		Goalie stats	Michael Zador (4 saves / 6 shots); Scott Stajcer (24 saves / 29 shots)

May 12	Owen Sound Attack	3–2	Mississauga St. Michael's Majors	Bayshore Community Centre	Recap
No scoring		First period	Maxim Kitsyn (10) - pp - 13:50
9:48 - pp - Garrett Wilson (11); 16:21 - Joey Hishon (5)		Second period	No scoring
7:27 - pp - Geoffrey Schemitsch (1)		Third period	Devante Smith-Pelly (15) - 18:49
Jordan Binnington (41 saves / 43 shots)		Goalie stats	J. P. Anderson (30 saves / 33 shots)

May 15	Mississauga St. Michael's Majors	2–3	OT	Owen Sound Attack	Hershey Centre	Recap
7:26 - Stuart Percy (2); 14:48 - pp - Jordan Mayer (9)		First period		Mike Halmo (5) - 4:14; Jarrod Maidens (5) - 12:34
No scoring		Second period		No scoring
No scoring		Third period		No scoring
No scoring		First overtime period		Jarrod Maidens (6) - 3:27
J. P. Anderson (26 saves / 29 shots)		Goalie stats		Jordan Binnington (25 saves / 27 shots)

Owen Sound wins series 4–3

=== J. Ross Robertson Cup Champions Roster ===
2010-11 Owen Sound Attack
Goaltenders: (Canada) 31 – Jordan Binnington; (Canada) 35 – Michael Zador; (Canada) 40 – Scott Stajcer	Defencemen: (Canada) 2 – Keevin Cutting; (Canada) 3 – Greg Staeger; (Canada) 4 – Jay Gilbert; (Canada) 6 – Brayden Rose; (Canada) 12 – Jesse Blacker; (Canada) 22 – Matt Petgrave; (Canada) 24 – Matt Stanisz – A; (Canada) 26 – Geoffrey Schemitsch	Wingers: (Russia) 8 – Roman Berdnikov; (Canada) 10 – Robby Mignardi – A; (Canada) 11 – Cameron Brace; (Canada) 17 – Garrett Wilson – C; (Canada) 19 – Andrew Fritsch; (Canada) 20 – Brendan Childerley; (Canada) 21 – Holden Cook; (Canada) 25 – Daniel Zweep; (Canada) 29 – Kurtis Gabriel; (Canada) 28 – Mike Halmo; (Canada) 37 – Liam Heelis	Centres: (Canada) 7 – Jarrod Maidens; (Canada) 9 – Gemel Smith; (Canada) 15 – Andrew Shaw; (Canada) 18 – Joey Hishon – A; Coach: (Canada) Mark Reeds; General Manager: (Canada) Dale DeGray

=== Playoff scoring leaders ===
Note: GP = Games played; G = Goals; A = Assists; Pts = Points; PIM = Penalty minutes

Player	Team	GP	G	A	Pts	PIM
Robby Mignardi	Owen Sound Attack	22	15	9	24	16
Joey Hishon	Owen Sound Attack	22	5	19	24	32
Tom Kühnhackl	Windsor Spitfires	18	11	12	23	10
Devante Smith-Pelly	Mississauga St. Michael's Majors	20	15	6	21	16
Garrett Wilson	Owen Sound Attack	22	11	10	21	28
Alexander Khokhlachev	Windsor Spitfires	18	9	11	20	8
Maxim Kitsyn	Mississauga St. Michael's Majors	20	10	9	19	14
Justin Shugg	Mississauga St. Michael's Majors	20	10	9	19	14
Christian Thomas	Oshawa Generals	10	9	10	19	4
Ryan Ellis	Windsor Spitfires	18	6	13	19	12
Casey Cizikas	Mississauga St. Michael's Majors	16	5	14	19	14

=== Playoff leading goaltenders ===
Note: GP = Games played; Mins = Minutes played; W = Wins; L = Losses; GA = Goals Allowed; SO = Shutouts; SV& = Save percentage; GAA = Goals against average

Player	Team	GP	Mins	W	L	GA	SO	Sv%	GAA
Malcolm Subban	Belleville Bulls	3	178	0	3	6	0	0.933	2.02
J. P. Anderson	Mississauga St. Michael's Majors	20	1223	15	5	43	4	0.920	2.11
Michael Zador	Owen Sound Attack	7	309	4	0	11	1	0.929	2.13
Mike Morrison	Kitchener Rangers	3	180	2	1	7	1	0.939	2.33
Mark Visentin	Niagara IceDogs	14	823	9	5	35	1	0.929	2.55

== All-Star teams ==
The OHL All-Star Teams were selected by the OHL's General Managers.

=== First team ===
- Joey Hishon, Centre, Owen Sound Attack
- Garrett Wilson, Left Wing, Owen Sound Attack
- Tyler Toffoli, Right wing, Ottawa 67's
- Ryan Ellis, Defence, Windsor Spitfires
- Ryan Murphy, Defence, Kitchener Rangers
- Mark Visentin, Goalie, Niagara IceDogs
- Mark Reeds, Coach, Owen Sound Attack

=== Second team ===
- Ryan Strome, Centre, Niagara IceDogs
- Marcus Foligno, Left Wing, Sudbury Wolves
- Jason Akeson, Right wing, Kitchener Rangers
- Dougie Hamilton, Defence, Niagara IceDogs
- Marc Cantin, Defence, Mississauga St. Michael's Majors
- J. P. Anderson, Goalie, Mississauga St. Michael's Majors
- Dave Cameron, Coach, Mississauga St. Michael's Majors

=== Third team ===
- Casey Cizikas, Centre, Mississauga St. Michael's Majors
- Josh Shalla, Left Wing, Saginaw Spirit
- Christian Thomas, Right wing, Oshawa Generals
- Brett Flemming, Defence, Mississauga St. Michael's Majors
- Jesse Blacker, Defence, Owen Sound Attack
- Petr Mrázek, Goalie, Ottawa 67's
- Mike Vellucci, Coach, Plymouth Whalers

== Awards ==
J. Ross Robertson Cup:	Owen Sound Attack
Hamilton Spectator Trophy:	Mississauga St. Michael's Majors
Bobby Orr Trophy:	Mississauga St. Michael's Majors
Wayne Gretzky Trophy:	Owen Sound Attack
Emms Trophy:	Mississauga St. Michael's Majors
Leyden Trophy:	Ottawa 67's
Holody Trophy:	Owen Sound Attack
Bumbacco Trophy:	Saginaw Spirit
Red Tilson Trophy:	Ryan Ellis, Windsor Spitfires
Eddie Powers Memorial Trophy:	Tyler Toffoli, Ottawa 67's & Jason Akeson, Kitchener Rangers
Matt Leyden Trophy:	Mark Reeds, Owen Sound Attack
Jim Mahon Memorial Trophy:	Tyler Toffoli, Ottawa 67's & Jason Akeson, Kitchener Rangers
Max Kaminsky Trophy:	Ryan Ellis, Windsor Spitfires
OHL Goaltender of the Year:	Mark Visentin, Niagara IceDogs
Jack Ferguson Award:	Aaron Ekblad, Barrie Colts
Dave Pinkney Trophy:	J. P. Anderson & Mikael Audette, Mississauga St. Michael's Majors
OHL Executive of the Year:	Dale DeGray, Owen Sound Attack
Emms Family Award:	Nail Yakupov, Sarnia Sting
F.W. "Dinty" Moore Trophy:	Matej Machovsky, Guelph Storm & Brampton Battalion
Dan Snyder Memorial Trophy:	Jack Walchessen, Peterborough Petes
William Hanley Trophy:	Jason Akeson, Kitchener Rangers
Leo Lalonde Memorial Trophy:	Jason Akeson, Kitchener Rangers
Bobby Smith Trophy:	Dougie Hamilton, Niagara IceDogs
Roger Neilson Memorial Award:	Derek Lanoue, Windsor Spitfires
Ivan Tennant Memorial Award:	Andrew D'Agostini, Peterborough Petes
Mickey Renaud Captain's Trophy:	Ryan Ellis, Windsor Spitfires
Tim Adams Memorial Trophy:	Aaron Berisha, Toronto Marlboros
Wayne Gretzky 99 Award:	Robby Mignardi, Owen Sound Attack

== 2011 OHL Priority Selection ==
On May 7, 2011, the OHL conducted the 2011 Ontario Hockey League Priority Selection. The Barrie Colts held the first overall pick in the draft, and selected Aaron Ekblad from the Sun County Panthers. Ekblad was awarded the Jack Ferguson Award, awarded to the top pick in the draft.

Below are the players who were selected in the first round of the 2011 Ontario Hockey League Priority Selection.

#	Player	Nationality	OHL team	Hometown	Minor team
1	Aaron Ekblad (D)	Canada	Barrie Colts	Belle River, Ontario	Sun County Panthers
2	Nick Ritchie (LW)	Canada	Peterborough Petes	Orangeville, Ontario	Toronto Marlboros
3	Darnell Nurse (D)	Canada	Sault Ste. Marie Greyhounds	Hamilton, Ontario	Don Mills Flyers
4	Ryan Kujawinski (C)	Canada	Sarnia Sting	Iroquois Falls, Ontario	Sudbury Jr. Wolves
5	Jordan Subban (D)	Canada	Belleville Bulls	Toronto, Ontario	Toronto Marlboros
6	Nicholas Baptiste (RW)	Canada	Sudbury Wolves	Nepean, Ontario	Ottawa Jr. Senators
7	Brandon Robinson (LW)	Canada	Brampton Battalion	Pickering, Ontario	Toronto Jr. Canadiens
8	Max Domi (C)	Canada	Kingston Frontenacs	Toronto, Ontario	Don Mills Flyers
9	Bo Horvat (C)	Canada	London Knights	Rodney, Ontario	Elgin-Middlesex Chiefs
10	Hunter Garlent (C)	Canada	Guelph Storm	Thorold, Ontario	Southern Tier Admirals
11	Mitchell Dempsey (LW)	Canada	Plymouth Whalers	Cambridge, Ontario	Cambridge Hawks
12	Stephen Harper (C)	Canada	Erie Otters	Burlington, Ontario	Burlington Eagles
13	Jordan Maletta (C)	Canada	Windsor Spitfires	St. Catharines, Ontario	St. Catharines Falcons
14	Brent Pedersen (LW)	Canada	Kitchener Rangers	Arthur, Ontario	Waterloo Wolves
15	Nick Moutrey (LW)	Canada	Saginaw Spirit	Shelburne, Ontario	York-Simcoe Express
16	Cole Cassels (C)	United States	Oshawa Generals	Columbus, Ohio	Ohio Blue Jackets 16U
17	David Perklin (LW)	Canada	Ottawa 67's	Mississauga, Ontario	Toronto Marlboros
18	Spencer Martin (G)	Canada	Mississauga St. Michael's Majors	Oakville, Ontario	Toronto Jr. Canadiens
19	Adam Bateman (D)	Canada	Niagara IceDogs	Caledon, Ontario	Don Mills Flyers
20	Zachary Nastasiuk (RW)	Canada	Owen Sound Attack	Barrie, Ontario	Barrie Jr. Colts
21	Scott Teskey (RW)	Canada	Mississauga St. Michael's Majors	Toronto, Ontario	Toronto Jr. Canadiens
22	Alexander Yuill (D)	Canada	Barrie Colts	Wellington, Ontario	Quinte Red Devils

== 2011 NHL entry draft ==
On June 24–25, 2011, the National Hockey League conducted the 2011 NHL entry draft held at the Xcel Energy Center in St. Paul, Minnesota. In total, 46 players from the Ontario Hockey League were selected in the draft. Gabriel Landeskog of the Kitchener Rangers was the first player from the OHL to be selected, as he was taken with the second overall pick by the Colorado Avalanche.

Below are the players selected from OHL teams at the NHL Entry Draft.

Round	#	Player	Nationality	NHL team	Hometown	OHL team
1	2	Gabriel Landeskog (RW)	Sweden	Colorado Avalanche	Stockholm, Sweden	Kitchener Rangers
1	5	Ryan Strome (C)	Canada	New York Islanders	Mississauga, Ontario	Niagara IceDogs
1	7	Mark Scheifele (C)	Canada	Winnipeg Jets	Kitchener, Ontario	Barrie Colts
1	9	Dougie Hamilton (D)	Canada	Boston Bruins	Toronto, Ontario	Niagara IceDogs
1	12	Ryan Murphy (D)	Canada	Carolina Hurricanes	Aurora, Ontario	Kitchener Rangers
1	21	Stefan Noesen (RW)	United States	Ottawa Senators	Plano, Texas	Plymouth Whalers
1	24	Matt Puempel (LW)	Canada	Ottawa Senators	Essex, Ontario	Peterborough Petes
1	25	Stuart Percy (D)	Canada	Toronto Maple Leafs	Oakville, Ontario	Mississauga St. Michael's Majors
1	27	Vladislav Namestnikov (C)	Russia	Tampa Bay Lightning	Voskresensk, Russia	London Knights
1	29	Nicklas Jensen (RW)	Denmark	Vancouver Canucks	Herning, Denmark	Oshawa Generals
1	30	Rickard Rakell (LW)	Sweden	Anaheim Ducks	Sollentuna, Sweden	Plymouth Whalers
2	37	Boone Jenner (C)	Canada	Columbus Blue Jackets	Dorchester, Ontario	Oshawa Generals
2	40	Alexander Khokhlachev (C)	Russia	Boston Bruins	Moscow, Russia	Windsor Spitfires
2	43	Brandon Saad (LW)	United States	Chicago Blackhawks	Gibsonia, Pennsylvania	Saginaw Spirit
2	44	Brett Ritchie (RW)	Canada	Dallas Stars	Orangeville, Ontario	Sarnia Sting
2	54	Scott Harrington (D)	Canada	Pittsburgh Penguins	Kingston, Ontario	London Knights
2	55	Ryan Sproul (D)	Canada	Detroit Red Wings	Mississauga, Ontario	Sault Ste. Marie Greyhounds
2	56	Lucas Lessio (LW)	Canada	Phoenix Coyotes	Maple, Ontario	Oshawa Generals
2	61	Shane Prince (LW)	United States	Ottawa Senators	Spencerport, New York	Ottawa 67's
3	63	Andrei Pedan (D)	Russia	New York Islanders	Moscow, Russia	Guelph Storm
3	64	Vincent Trocheck (C)	United States	Florida Panthers	Pittsburgh, Pennsylvania	Saginaw Spirit
3	65	Joseph Cramarossa (C)	Canada	Anaheim Ducks	Markham, Ontario	Mississauga St. Michael's Majors
3	68	Nick Cousins (C)	Canada	Philadelphia Flyers	Belleville, Ontario	Sault Ste. Marie Greyhounds
3	77	Daniel Catenacci (C)	Canada	Buffalo Sabres	Newmarket, Ontario	Sault Ste. Marie Greyhounds
3	80	Andy Andreoff (LW)	Canada	Los Angeles Kings	Pickering, Ontario	Oshawa Generals
3	81	Anthony Camara (LW)	Canada	Boston Bruins	Toronto, Ontario	Saginaw Spirit
3	85	Alan Quine (C)	Canada	Detroit Red Wings	Ottawa, Ontario	Peterborough Petes
3	86	Josh Leivo (LW)	Canada	Toronto Maple Leafs	Innisfil, Ontario	Sudbury Wolves
3	88	Jordan Binnington (G)	Canada	St. Louis Blues	Gravenhurst, Ontario	Owen Sound Attack
3	89	Justin Sefton (D)	Canada	San Jose Sharks	Thunder Bay, Ontario	Sudbury Wolves
4	94	Josh Shalla (LW)	Canada	Nashville Predators	Whitby, Ontario	Saginaw Spirit
4	114	Tobias Rieder (RW)	Germany	Edmonton Oilers	Landshut, Germany	Kitchener Rangers
4	116	Colin Suellentrop (D)	United States	Philadelphia Flyers	Plantation, Florida	Oshawa Generals
5	123	Garrett Meurs (RW)	Canada	Colorado Avalanche	Ripley, Ontario	Plymouth Whalers
5	137	Alex Lepkowski (D)	United States	Buffalo Sabres	Buffalo, New York	Barrie Colts
5	139	Andrew Shaw (C)	Canada	Chicago Blackhawks	Belleville, Ontario	Owen Sound Attack
5	149	Austen Brassard (RW)	Canada	Winnipeg Jets	Windsor, Ontario	Belleville Bulls
5	150	Frank Corrado (D)	Canada	Vancouver Canucks	Woodbridge, Ontario	Sudbury Wolves
6	152	David Broll (LW)	Canada	Toronto Maple Leafs	Mississauga, Ontario	Sault Ste. Marie Greyhounds
6	155	Andrew Fritsch (LW)	Canada	Phoenix Coyotes	Brantford, Ontario	Owen Sound Attack
6	163	Matt Mahalak (G)	United States	Carolina Hurricanes	Monroe, Michigan	Plymouth Whalers
6	179	Dylan DeMelo (D)	Canada	San Jose Sharks	London, Ontario	Mississauga St. Michael's Majors
7	185	Mitchell Theoret (LW)	Canada	New York Islanders	Montreal, Quebec	Niagara IceDogs
7	190	Garret Sparks (G)	United States	Toronto Maple Leafs	Elmhurst, Illinois	Guelph Storm
7	191	Tyler Graovac (C)	Canada	Minnesota Wild	Brampton, Ontario	Ottawa 67's
7	206	Derek Mathers (RW)	Canada	Philadelphia Flyers	Strathroy, Ontario	Peterborough Petes

== 2011 CHL Import Draft ==
On June 27, 2011, the Canadian Hockey League conducted the 2011 CHL Import Draft, in which teams in all three CHL leagues participate in. The London Knights held the first pick in the draft by a team in the OHL, and selected Olli Maatta from Finland with their selection.

Below are the players who were selected in the first round by Ontario Hockey League teams in the 2011 CHL Import Draft.

#	Player	Nationality	OHL team	Hometown	Last Team
1	Olli Maatta (D)	Finland	London Knights	Jyvaskyla, Finland	JYP Jr.
4	Peter Ceresnak (D)	Slovakia	Peterborough Petes	Trenčín, Slovakia	HK Orange 20
7	Egor Malenkikh (D)	Russia	Sault Ste. Marie Greyhounds	Chelyabinsk, Russia	Tyumen Gazovik Junior
10	Patrik Machac (C)	Czech Republic	Brampton Battalion	Hýskov, Czech Republic	HC Kladno Jr.
13	Daniil Zharkov (LW)	Russia	Belleville Bulls	Saint Petersburg, Russia	Tri-City Storm
16	Sergey Kuptsov (RW)	Russia	Mississauga St. Michael's Majors	Ekaterinburg, Russia	Salavat Yulaev Ufa Junior U17
19	Johan Mattsson (G)	Sweden	Sudbury Wolves	Huddinge, Sweden	Sodertalje SK Jr.
22	Radek Faksa (C)	Czech Republic	Kitchener Rangers	Opava, Czech Republic	HC Trinec Zelenzarny Jr.
25	Matthias Niederberger (G)	Germany	Barrie Colts	Düsseldorf, Germany	DEG Metro Stars
28	Tanner Richard (C)	Switzerland	Guelph Storm	Rapperswil-Jona, Switzerland	Rapperswill-Jona Lakers Jr.
31	Sondre Olden (LW)	Norway	Erie Otters	Oslo, Norway	Modo Hockey Jr.
34	David Elsner (RW)	Germany	Sault Ste. Marie Greyhounds	Landshut, Germany	EV Landshut Jr.
37	Vladimir Tkachyov (C)	Russia	Erie Otters	Omsk, Russia	Irbis Kazan
40	Michael Schumacher (LW)	Sweden	Owen Sound Attack	Stenungsund, Sweden	Frolunda HC Jr.
43	Vadim Khlopotov (LW)	Russia	Saginaw Spirit	Nizhny Tagil, Russia	Loko Yaroslavl
46	Sebastian Uvira (LW)	Germany	Oshawa Generals	Landshut, Germany	EV Landshut Jr.
49	Ludvig Rensfeldt (LW)	Sweden	Sarnia Sting	Gävle, Sweden	Brynas IF
52	Jaroslav Pavelka (G)	Czech Republic	Niagara IceDogs	Trutnov, Czech Republic	HK Hradec Kralove Jr. D
55	Artur Gavrus (C/LW)	Belarus	Owen Sound Attack	Ratichi, Belarus	Belarus 94
57	Jiri Sekac (LW)	Czech Republic	Sudbury Wolves	Kladno, Czech Republic	Youngstown Phantoms

== See also ==
- 2011 Memorial Cup
- List of OHL seasons
- 2010–11 QMJHL season
- 2010–11 WHL season
- 2010 NHL entry draft
- List of OHA Junior A standings
- 2010 in ice hockey
- 2011 in ice hockey

Preceded by 2009–10 OHL season	OHL seasons	Succeeded by 2011–12 OHL season
