= Maxim Kitsyn =

Russian ice hockey player

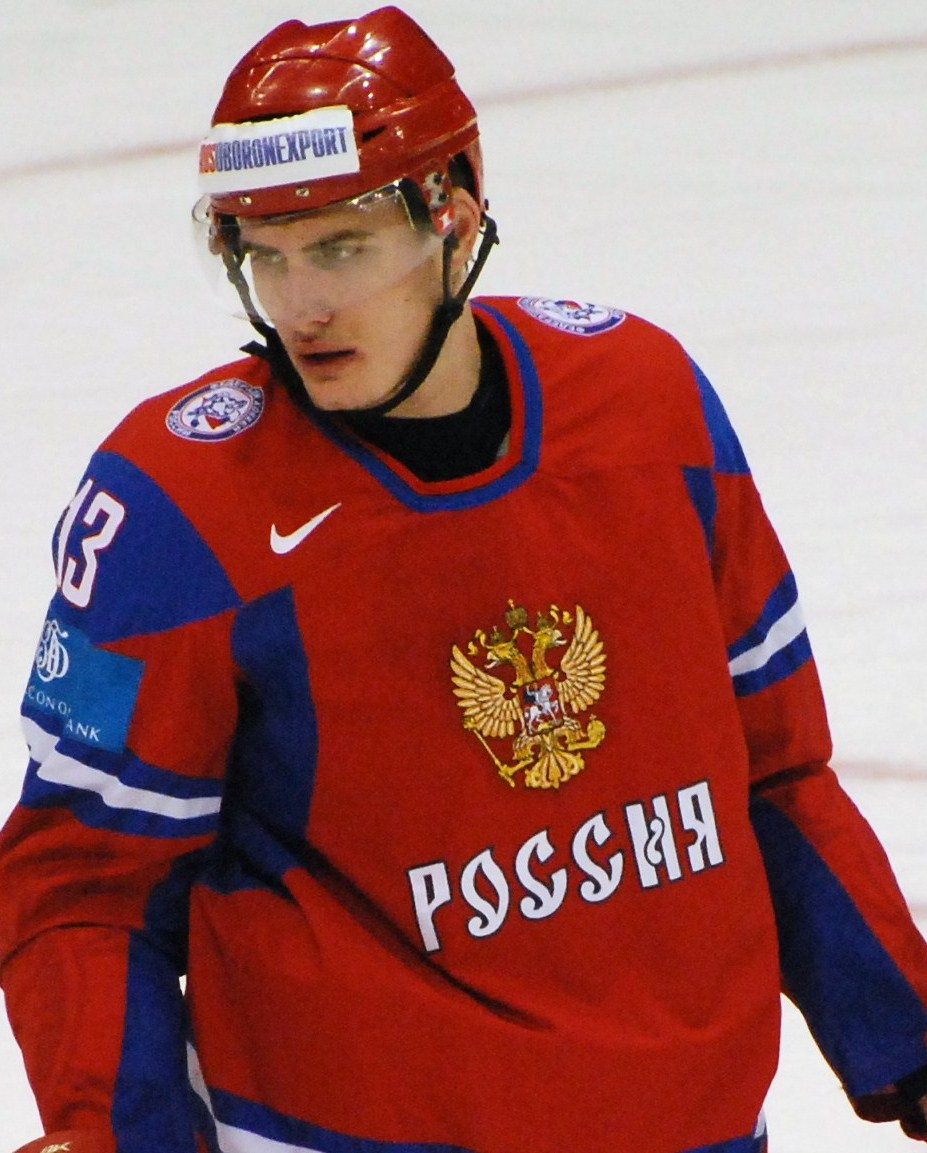
- Kitsyn with Russia during the 2010 World Junior Ice Hockey Championships
- Born: December 24, 1991 (age 34) Novokuznetsk, Russian SFSR, Soviet Union
- Height: 6 ft 2 in (188 cm)
- Weight: 194 lb (88 kg; 13 st 12 lb)
- Position: Left wing
- Shoots: Right
- VHL team Former teams: Molot Perm; Metallurg Novokuznetsk; Torpedo Nizhny Novgorod; Manchester Monarchs; Ontario Reign; Admiral Vladivostok
- NHL draft: 158th overall, 2010; Los Angeles Kings
- Playing career: 2008–present

Medal record

Representing Russia

IIHF World Junior Championships
Gold medal – first place	2011 United States	

IIHF World U18 Championships
Silver medal – second place	2009 United States	

Maxim Alekseyevich Kitsyn (Russian: Максим Алексеевич Кицын; born December 24, 1991) is a Russian professional ice hockey player currently under contract with Molot Perm of the Supreme Hockey League (VHL). He has previously played in the Kontinental Hockey League with Metallurg Novokuznetsk, Torpedo Nizhny Novgorod and Admiral Vladivostok.

== Playing career ==
Kitsyn was drafted 158th overall in 2010 by the Los Angeles Kings. On July 10, 2013, Kitsyn was signed to a three-year entry-level contract with the Kings.

In his three years within the Kings organization, Kitsyn was unable to make an impact at the North American level and as an impending restricted free agent opted to return to Russia in signing a one-year deal for a second tenure with Torpedo Nizhny Novgorod on May 25, 2016.

After an unsuccessful second tenure with Torpedo in the 2016–17 season, Kitsyn was released as a free agent and signed a one-year pact with his third KHL club, Admiral Vladivostok, on July 9, 2017.

Following the 2017–18 season, having played in just 16 games with Admiral, Kitsyn was released as a free agent and agreed to a one-year contract with VHL club, Saryarka Karaganda, on August 14, 2018.

== Career statistics ==
=== Regular season and playoffs ===
			Regular season					Playoffs
Season	Team	League	GP	G	A	Pts	PIM	GP	G	A	Pts	PIM
2008–09	Metallurg Novokuznetsk	KHL	31	5	2	7	26	—	—	—	—	—
2009–10	Metallurg Novokuznetsk	KHL	21	1	1	2	12	—	—	—	—	—
2009–10	Kuznetskie Medvedi	MHL	11	6	12	18	26	17	9	12	21	42
2010–11	Metallurg Novokuznetsk	KHL	18	3	4	7	8	—	—	—	—	—
2010–11	Kuznetskie Medvedi	MHL	3	1	1	2	2	—	—	—	—	—
2010–11	Mississauga St. Michael's Majors	OHL	32	9	17	26	24	20	10	9	19	14
2011–12	Metallurg Novokuznetsk	KHL	32	1	2	3	13	—	—	—	—	—
2011–12	Yermak Angarsk	VHL	6	2	2	4	0	4	0	0	0	4
2011–12	Kuznetskie Medvedi	MHL	10	7	1	8	10	7	3	3	6	8
2012–13	Torpedo Nizhny Novgorod	KHL	8	0	0	0	4	—	—	—	—	—
2012–13	HC Sarov	VHL	29	9	3	12	63	5	1	1	2	4
2013–14	Manchester Monarchs	AHL	20	3	1	4	2	—	—	—	—	—
2013–14	Ontario Reign	ECHL	33	14	16	30	27	4	1	0	1	2
2014–15	Ontario Reign	ECHL	57	26	17	43	155	19	4	7	11	19
2014–15	Manchester Monarchs	AHL	7	1	0	1	0	—	—	—	—	—
2015–16	Manchester Monarchs	ECHL	65	26	29	55	59	5	2	1	3	0
2015–16	Ontario Reign	AHL	2	0	0	0	0	—	—	—	—	—
2016–17	Torpedo Nizhny Novgorod	KHL	4	0	0	0	4	—	—	—	—	—
2016–17	HC Sarov	VHL	19	2	2	4	16	—	—	—	—	—
2017–18	Admiral Vladivostok	KHL	16	0	2	2	26	—	—	—	—	—
2017–18	Yuzhny Ural Orsk	VHL	11	2	4	6	72	—	—	—	—	—
2018–19	Saryarka Karaganda	VHL	38	10	14	24	50	18	5	2	7	15
2019–20	Metallurg Novokuznetsk	VHL	53	39	30	69	32	—	—	—	—	—
2020–21	Metallurg Novokuznetsk	VHL	43	17	10	27	18	20	12	15	27	10
2021–22	Metallurg Novokuznetsk	VHL	52	32	36	68	32	5	2	4	6	4
2022–23	Metallurg Novokuznetsk	VHL	49	19	19	38	31	18	7	9	16	14
2023–24	Metallurg Novokuznetsk	VHL	15	4	5	9	12	—	—	—	—	—
2023–24	HC Yugra	VHL	31	15	12	27	24	12	2	1	3	0
KHL totals			130	10	11	21	93	—	—	—	—	—
