= Mike Halmo =

Canadian ice hockey player

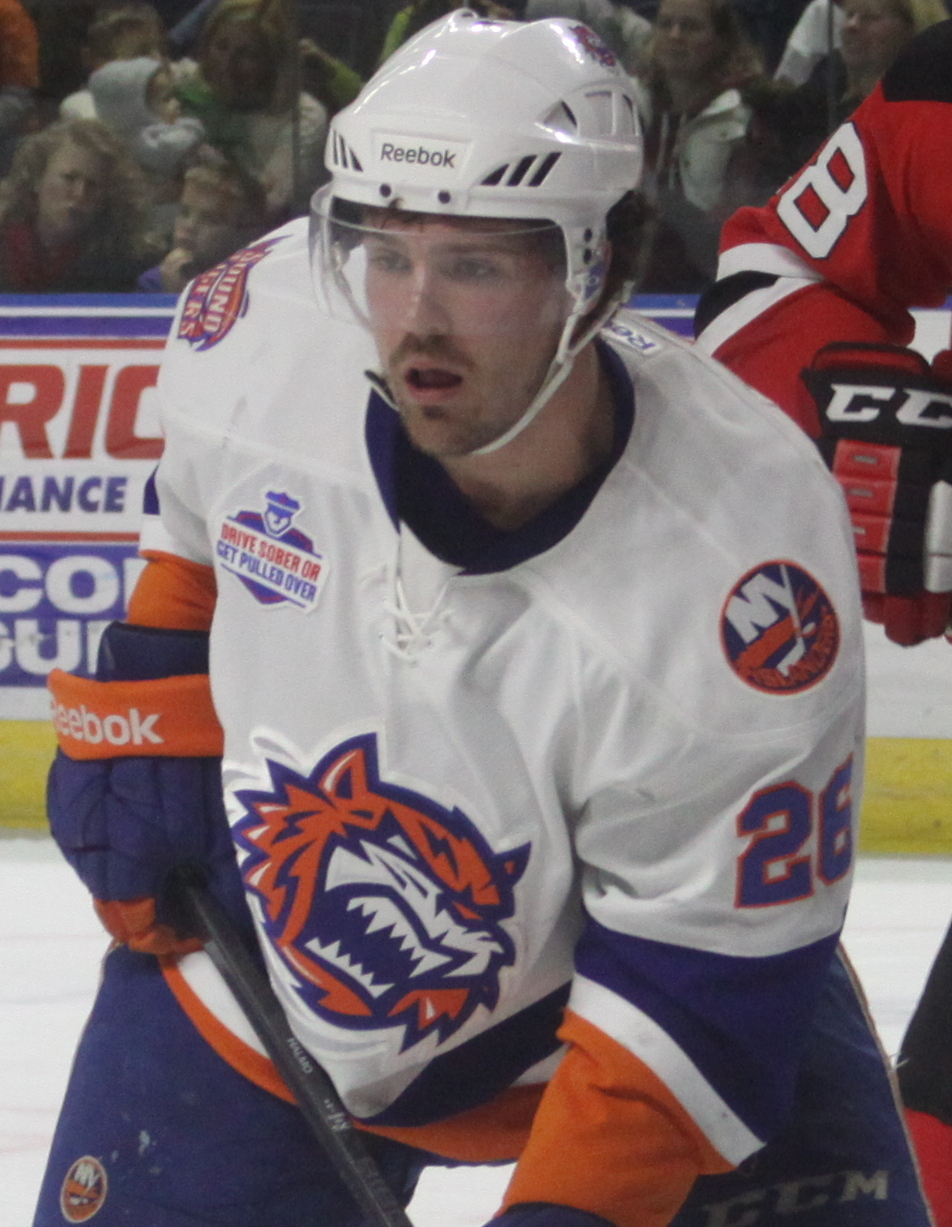
- Halmo with the Bridgeport Sound Tigers in 2013
- Born: May 15, 1991 (age 35) Waterloo, Ontario, Canada
- Height: 5 ft 10 in (178 cm)
- Weight: 197 lb (89 kg; 14 st 1 lb)
- Position: Left wing
- Shot: Left
- Played for: New York Islanders; Bridgeport Sound Tigers; Ilves; Iserlohn Roosters; HC Bolzano
- Current AlpsHL coach: Ritten Sport
- NHL draft: Undrafted
- Playing career: 2011–2025
- Coaching career: 2025–present

Michael Halmo (born May 15, 1991) is a Canadian ice hockey coach and former professional ice hockey left winger who is currently assistant coach for Ritten Sport of the Alps Hockey League.

As a player, he joined the Owen Sound Attack of the Ontario Hockey League in 2008 and remained there until his first full season with the Bridgeport Sound Tigers in 2012, a year after being signed by the New York Islanders.

== Playing career ==
Halmo joined the Owen Sound Attack during the 2008–09 season, playing 62 games with the team during his first season in the Ontario Hockey League (OHL). He tallied eight points and picked up an assist during the playoffs that year, though the team was eliminated in the first round. The following season, Halmo lead the Attack in penalty minutes, with 121. The Attack won the J. Ross Robertson Cup during the 2010–11 season, with Halmo scoring 20 goals.

In 2011, a free-agent Halmo signed a three-year, entry-level contract with the New York Islanders of the National Hockey League (NHL). He was assigned to the Islanders' minor league affiliate, the Bridgeport Sound Tigers of the American Hockey League (AHL). Only playing in five games during the season with the Sound Tigers, Halmo spent the majority of the season with the Attack until he received a 10-game suspension for a hit on Edmonton Oilers prospect, Nail Yakupov. Due to the suspension, he missed one of the Attack's playoff series. In the 2012–13 season, he played entirely with the Sound Tigers, picking up fourteen points throughout 46 games.

In February 2014, Halmo was recalled by the Islanders along with Ryan Strome and Anders Lee. At the time of being recalled, he ranked third among the Sound Tigers in scoring, with 37 points in 53 games. He scored his first NHL goal on April 1, 2014 in a game against the Florida Panthers.

After four seasons within the Islanders organization, Halmo left as a free agent to sign a one-year, two-way contract with the Tampa Bay Lightning on July 9, 2016.

Halmo played one season within the Lightning organization before leaving as a free agent. With no further NHL interest, Halmo opted to sign abroad in agreeing to a one-year deal with Italian outfit, HCB South Tyrol, who compete in the EBEL on September 6, 2017.

Following the 2018–19 season in the Finnish Liiga with Ilves, posting 5 goals and 16 points, Halmo continued his European career in signing a one-year contract with German club, Iserlohn Roosters of the Deutsche Eishockey Liga (DEL), on May 29, 2019.

After one season in Germany, Halmo left the Roosters to return to Italian club HC Bolzano of the renamed ICE Hockey League, on September 2, 2020. He played for the south-tyrolean team until the end of season 2024-2025, when Halmo announced his retirement. He became assistant coach of Alps Hockey League club Ritten Sport as well as Head coach of the Under-19 team.

== Career statistics ==
			Regular season					Playoffs
Season	Team	League	GP	G	A	Pts	PIM	GP	G	A	Pts	PIM
2008–09	Owen Sound Attack	OHL	62	5	3	8	90	4	0	1	1	2
2009–10	Owen Sound Attack	OHL	60	11	18	29	121	—	—	—	—	—
2010–11	Owen Sound Attack	OHL	59	20	23	43	121	22	5	10	15	36
2011–12	Owen Sound Attack	OHL	66	40	45	85	162	—	—	—	—	—
2011–12	Bridgeport Sound Tigers	AHL	5	1	0	1	5	—	—	—	—	—
2012–13	Bridgeport Sound Tigers	AHL	46	5	9	14	46	—	—	—	—	—
2013–14	Bridgeport Sound Tigers	AHL	56	18	20	38	137	—	—	—	—	—
2013–14	New York Islanders	NHL	20	1	0	1	32	—	—	—	—	—
2014–15	Bridgeport Sound Tigers	AHL	33	10	8	18	83	—	—	—	—	—
2015–16	Bridgeport Sound Tigers	AHL	74	22	19	41	117	3	1	0	1	0
2016–17	Syracuse Crunch	AHL	69	16	12	28	100	—	—	—	—	—
2017–18	HC Bolzano	EBEL	54	19	29	48	69	18	1	5	6	18
2018–19	Ilves	Liiga	52	5	11	16	111	6	1	0	1	4
2019–20	Iserlohn Roosters	DEL	52	11	20	31	76	—	—	—	—	—
2020–21	HC Bolzano	ICEHL	38	11	16	27	91	12	3	6	9	14
2021–22	HC Bolzano	ICEHL	43	16	14	30	32	2	0	2	2	27
NHL totals			20	1	0	1	32	—	—	—	—	—
