= Sam Lofquist =

American ice hockey player

- Born: March 15, 1990 (age 36) Somerset, Wisconsin, U.S.
- Height: 6 ft 2 in (188 cm)
- Weight: 205 lb (93 kg; 14 st 9 lb)
- Position: Defense
- Shoots: Right
- Liiga team Former teams: Kookoo; Houston Aeros; SaiPa; Torpedo Nizhny Novgorod; EHC Biel; San Antonio Rampage; Kunlun Red Star; Linköping HC
- NHL draft: Undrafted
- Playing career: 2011–present

Dr. Samuel (Sam) Lofquist, DMD is an American biological dentist and former professional ice hockey player. He is the founder of Biological Dentistry of Southern California in San Juan Capistrano, California, a clinic specializing in surgically based biological dentistry, zirconia (ceramic) implants, advanced bone grafting techniques, airway dentistry, and SMART amalgam removal. Dr. Lofquist completed the Tufts University Maxi Residency in Biological Dentistry, Biological Surgery, Implantology, focused on Guided Open Wound Healing, known worldwide for training the best biological dentists. Prior to his dental career, he was a professional hockey player for parts of 12 seasons in North America, Sweden (SHL), Finland (Liiga), Russia (KHL), Switzerland (NLA), and China (KHL). Dr. Lofquist started down his dental and biological dentistry journey after sustaining an oral injury to his front four teeth while playing in the Spengler Cup in Davos, Switzerland, and observing his health take a step backwards. Upon receiving biological dental treatment for his oral conditions, his health was able to recover. He then decided to pursue a career in biological dentistry.

== Dental career ==
Lofquist’s interest in biological dentistry originated from a traumatic dental injury sustained during his professional ice hockey career. While competing in the Spengler Cup in Davos, Switzerland, Lofquist was struck in the face by an opponent’s stick, resulting in significant trauma to four of his front teeth. Three of the injured teeth subsequently underwent emergency root canal treatment at a dental clinic in Switzerland. The incident marked the beginning of a series of personal health challenges that would ultimately influence his decision to transition from professional athletics into dentistry.

Following the injury, Lofquist reported experiencing a deterioration in his physical health, including hypertension, widespread eczema, chronic fatigue, cognitive difficulties, and declining athletic performance. He also described experiencing anxiety, depression, adrenal insufficiency, and a severe elbow infection requiring hospitalization and intravenous antibiotics. Despite seeking medical evaluations and treatment, Lofquist struggled to identify an explanation for his symptoms, which affected both his professional hockey career and personal life.

Lofquist was introduced to biological dentistry through a conversation with a teammate who suggested exploring alternative approaches to previously root canal-treated teeth. Intrigued by the possibility of a connection between oral health and systemic health, he contacted biological dental practitioners where he was living at the time. He subsequently elected to have his three root canal-treated teeth extracted using biological dental protocols. According to Lofquist, many of his previously reported symptoms gradually improved over the following months, including the resolution of his widespread eczema. Although the relationship between his dental treatment and systemic symptoms was not medically established, Lofquist has described the experience as a defining turning point in his life.

The experience inspired Lofquist to pursue a career in dentistry while still in the prime of his professional hockey career. He became particularly interested in the relationship between oral infections, dental materials, and systemic health, ultimately choosing to focus his education and clinical practice on biological dentistry. His clinical interests developed to include ceramic dental implants, surgical management of chronically infected extraction sites, removal of previously root canal-treated teeth, bone grafting techniques, and the use of three-dimensional cone-beam computed tomography (CBCT) in evaluating oral structures.

Lofquist earned his Doctor of Dental Medicine (DMD) degree from Roseman University. In addition to his formal dental education, he pursued more than 440 hours of continuing education, with an emphasis on biological dentistry, surgical dentistry, and ceramic implantology. His postgraduate training included educational programs at Swiss BioHealth in Switzerland, Costa Rica BioHealth, and the Holistic Dental Education program directed by Judson Wall. He also completed a Maxi-Residency in Biological Dentistry, Biological surgery, and Implantology, with additional training in guided open wound healing and regenerative surgical techniques, and is the only practitioner in Southern California to have completed the program. Lofquist is a member of the International Academy of Oral Medicine and Toxicology (IAOMT) and has completed its Safe Mercury Amalgam Removal Technique (SMART) certification program.

Lofquist founded Biological Dentistry of Southern California, a biological dental practice in San Juan Capistrano, California. The practice emphasizes biological surgical procedures, ceramic dental implants, biocompatible dental materials, airway dentistry, and regenerative techniques. In 2026, Dr. Lofquist and Biological Dentistry of Southern California received the prestigious American Recognition Awards "Best Biological Dentist" Award for the Southern California Region. This award was not only given to Dr. Lofquist for his contributions to biological dentistry in Southern California, but to the clinic Biological Dentistry of Southern California for its commitment to biological dentistry. Dr. Lofquist mentions that his clinic is 100% biological and committed to its "anything metal or dead comes out of your head" philosophy to reduce overall toxic load. Dr. Lofquist and Biological Dentistry of Southern California's clinical services include zirconia implant placement, titanium implant removal, surgical extractions, treatment of previously root canal-treated teeth, and evaluation of jawbone defects associated with previous extraction sites. The practice also incorporates platelet-rich fibrin, ozone therapy, and three-dimensional cone-beam computed tomography into selected diagnostic and treatment protocols.

Lofquist’s clinical philosophy emphasizes the use of metal-free dental materials, removing dead tissue from root canals and CSR/cavitations, individualized surgical treatment, and consideration of the relationship between oral and systemic health. His practice does not perform root canal therapy and considers itself a root-canal free practice and instead provides consultations regarding alternative treatment options, including extraction and ceramic implant replacement. His approach draws on surgical protocols and educational programs developed by practitioners in Europe and North America, particularly those associated with Swiss biological dentistry.

Lofquist has pursued advanced training through internationally established biological dentistry education programs, with a particular focus on ceramic implantology and regenerative oral surgery. His professional interests include the development and application of biological surgical protocols, the evaluation of chronic oral inflammatory conditions, and the use of biocompatible materials in dental reconstruction.

== Hockey career ==
Having attended the United States National U18 Team program and winning a bronze medal at the 2008 IIHF U-18 World Championships in Kazan, Russia, Lofquist enrolled at the University of Minnesota in 2008, left the Gophers in the course of his sophomore season and then signed with the Guelph Storm Hockey Club of the Ontario Hockey League in November 2009.

Following a short stint with the South Carolina Stingrays of the East Coast Hockey League (ECHL) in 2011, he took up an offer from IK Oskarshamn of Sweden's second division Allsvenskan. He stayed there until the end of the 2012–13 campaign, establishing himself as a defenseman with scoring ability and then was signed by fellow Allsvenskan team Djurgårdens IF for the 2013–14 season.

Lofquist received a contract offer from SaiPa Lappeenranta of Finland's top-flight Liiga after having completed the season with Djurgårdens IF and would spend two years with SaiPa, competing both in Liiga and in the Champions Hockey League.

In May 2016, Lofquist penned a deal with Torpedo Nizhny Novgorod of the Kontinental Hockey League (KHL) for the 2016–17 season, registering 13 points in 43 games.

After spending the 2017–18 season in Switzerland with EHC Biel of the National League, Lofquist opted to halt his 6-year European career and return to North America as a free agent.

On July 30, 2018, he agreed to a one-year AHL contract with the San Antonio Rampage, affiliate to the St. Louis Blues of the NHL. In returning to the AHL for the first time in seven years, Lofquist began the 2018–19 season on the Rampage's blueline second-pairing. Appearing in just 9 games through December, Lofquist opted to leave the Rampage and return abroad after securing a contract for the remainder of the season with Chinese KHL participant, Kunlun Red Star on December 25, 2018. Lofquist played out the remainder of the season with the Red Star, posting 11 points in just 18 games.

On May 1, 2019, Lofquist opted to continue in the KHL, agreeing to a two-year contract on the opening day of free agency with Russian club, HC Sibir Novosibirsk.

== Career statistics ==
=== Regular season and playoffs ===
			Regular season					Playoffs
Season	Team	League	GP	G	A	Pts	PIM	GP	G	A	Pts	PIM
2006–07	U.S. National Development Team	NAHL	47	8	6	14	86	6	1	0	1	22
2007–08	U.S. National Development Team	NAHL	14	4	2	6	10	—	—	—	—	—
2008–09	U. of Minnesota	WCHA	35	1	3	4	10	—	—	—	—	—
2009–10	U. of Minnesota	WCHA	3	0	0	0	6	—	—	—	—	—
2009–10	Guelph Storm	OHL	49	5	31	36	67	5	0	0	0	0
2010–11	Guelph Storm	OHL	62	8	28	36	57	6	3	5	8	0
2010–11	Houston Aeros	AHL	1	0	1	1	0	—	—	—	—	—
2011–12	South Carolina Stingrays	ECHL	1	0	0	0	0	—	—	—	—	—
2011–12	IK Oskarshamn	Allsv	41	7	10	17	42	6	0	3	3	2
2012–13	IK Oskarshamn	Allsv	52	13	12	25	64	6	2	2	4	6
2013–14	Djurgårdens IF	Allsv	51	6	18	24	38	3	0	0	0	0
2014–15	SaiPa	Liiga	59	9	19	28	57	6	3	0	3	4
2015–16	SaiPa	Liiga	58	10	17	27	59	6	0	1	1	2
2016–17	Torpedo Nizhny Novgorod	KHL	43	4	9	13	32	4	0	1	1	2
2017–18	EHC Biel	NL	24	4	9	13	16	5	1	4	5	10
2018–19	San Antonio Rampage	AHL	9	1	1	2	19	—	—	—	—	—
2018–19	Kunlun Red Star	KHL	18	3	8	11	16	—	—	—	—	—
2019–20	Linköping HC	SHL	33	7	9	16	68	—	—	—	—	—
2020–21	Kunlun Red Star	KHL	21	2	9	11	19	—	—	—	—
2020-21	SaiPa	Liiga	11	1	4	5	6
2021-22	Kookoo	Liiga	26	4	5	9	6	0	0	0	0	0
Liiga totals			117	19	36	55	116	12	3	1	4	6
KHL totals			82	9	26	35	67	4	0	1	1	2

=== International ===
Year	Team	Event	Result	GP	G	A	Pts	PIM
2008	United States	WJC18	3rd place, bronze medalist(s)	7	0	0	0	6
Junior totals				7	0	0	0	6
