= Justin Shugg =

Canadian ice hockey player (born 1991)

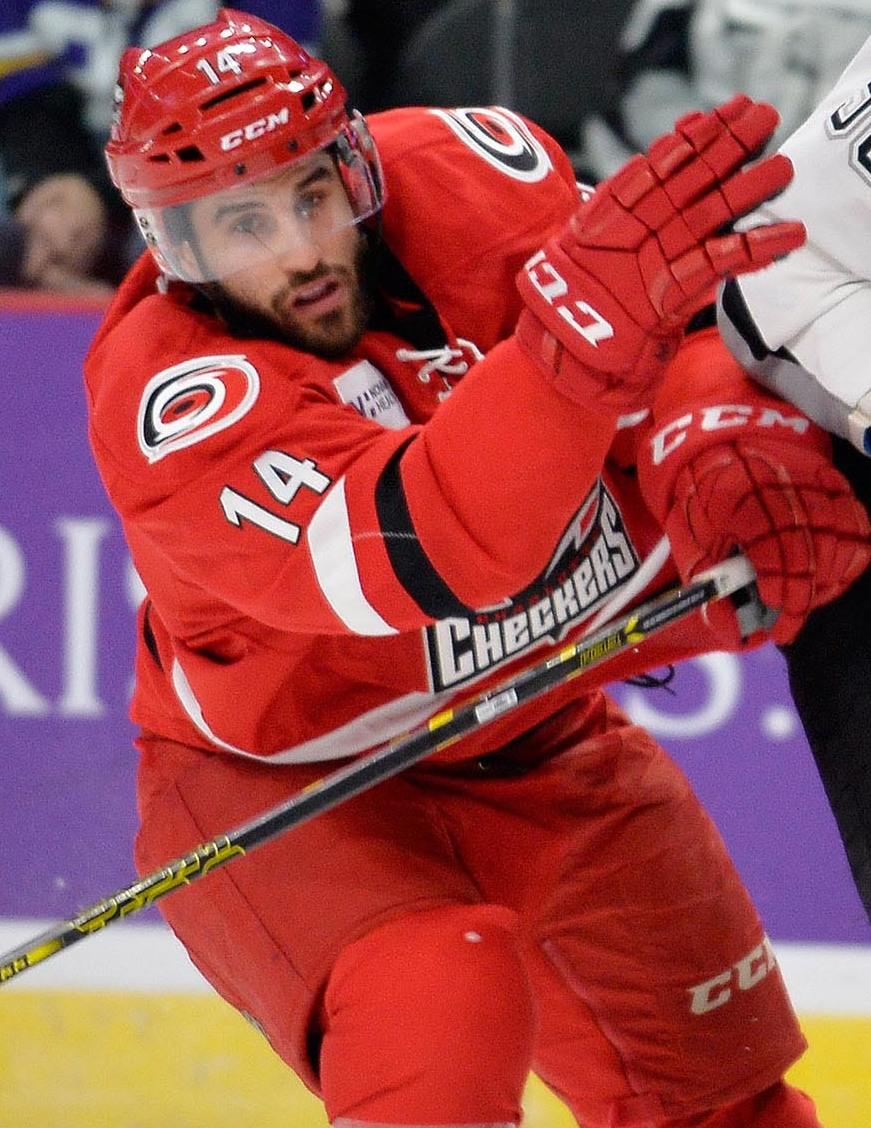
- Shugg with Charlotte Checkers in 2015
- Born: December 24, 1991 (age 34) Niagara Falls, Ontario, Canada
- Height: 5 ft 11 in (180 cm)
- Weight: 185 lb (84 kg; 13 st 3 lb)
- Position: Left wing
- Shot: Right
- Played for: Carolina Hurricanes; Dinamo Riga; Augsburger Panther; Kölner Haie; EHC München; SaiPa
- NHL draft: 105th overall, 2010; Carolina Hurricanes
- Playing career: 2011–2021

Justin Shugg (born December 24, 1991) is a Canadian former professional ice hockey forward. Shugg was selected by the Carolina Hurricanes in the fourth round (105th overall) of the 2010 NHL entry draft.

== Playing career ==
Shugg played four seasons (2007–2011) of major junior hockey in the Ontario Hockey League (OHL) where he scored 101 goals and 115 assists for 216 points and registered 146 penalty minutes in 262 games played.

On June 17, 2011, the Carolina Hurricanes of the National Hockey League (NHL) signed Shugg to a three-year entry-level contract and sent him to the Charlotte Checkers of the American Hockey League (AHL). In 2014–15, he saw the ice in three NHL contests for the Hurricanes.

At the conclusion of the 2015–16 season and not offered a new contract with the Hurricanes, Shugg as a free agent left North America and accepted an initial try-out contract with Latvian club, Dinamo Riga of the KHL on July 27, 2016. After 33 KHL contests, including two goals and nine assists, he parted company with Dinamo on December 13, 2016. Some days later, he signed a deal with Augsburger Panther of the Deutsche Eishockey Liga (DEL) in Germany for the remainder of the 2016–17 season.

After playing out the season with Augsburger, Shugg opted to remain in Germany, signing a one-year deal with Kölner Haie on June 8, 2017. In the following 2017–18 season, Shugg continued showing his offensive touch in the DEL, contributing with 16 goals and 37 points in 52 games with the Sharks.

He joined his third German club, in his third season, agreeing to a one-year contract with reigning three-time champions EHC München on June 19, 2018.

== Career statistics ==
			Regular season					Playoffs
Season	Team	League	GP	G	A	Pts	PIM	GP	G	A	Pts	PIM
2007–08	Oshawa Generals	OHL	38	4	10	14	10	—	—	—	—	—
2007–08	Windsor Spitfires	OHL	23	0	3	3	2	3	0	0	0	0
2008–09	Windsor Spitfires	OHL	68	17	16	33	48	20	5	4	9	16
2009–10	Windsor Spitfires	OHL	67	39	40	79	43	18	5	10	15	10
2010–11	Mississauga St. Michael's Majors	OHL	66	41	46	87	43	20	10	9	19	14
2011–12	Florida Everblades	ECHL	11	4	8	12	8	11	7	5	12	8
2011–12	Charlotte Checkers	AHL	33	5	8	13	12	—	—	—	—	—
2012–13	Florida Everblades	ECHL	19	11	11	22	20	—	—	—	—	—
2012–13	Charlotte Checkers	AHL	39	7	14	21	10	4	2	0	2	0
2013–14	Charlotte Checkers	AHL	75	16	22	38	26	—	—	—	—	—
2014–15	Charlotte Checkers	AHL	65	21	22	43	28	—	—	—	—	—
2014–15	Carolina Hurricanes	NHL	3	0	0	0	2	—	—	—	—	—
2015–16	Charlotte Checkers	AHL	59	13	22	35	36	—	—	—	—	—
2016–17	Dinamo Riga	KHL	33	2	9	11	6	—	—	—	—	—
2016–17	Augsburger Panther	DEL	20	8	9	17	8	6	2	4	6	0
2017–18	Kölner Haie	DEL	52	16	21	37	34	—	—	—	—	—
2018–19	EHC München	DEL	46	9	23	32	34	14	4	2	6	8
2019–20	EHC München	DEL	13	1	1	2	6	—	—	—	—	—
2019–20	SaiPa	Liiga	16	1	5	6	4	—	—	—	—	—
NHL totals			3	0	0	0	2	—	—	—	—	—
