= Alain Berger (ice hockey) =

Swiss ice hockey player (born 1990)

- Born: December 27, 1990 (age 35) Burgdorf, Switzerland
- Height: 6 ft 5 in (196 cm)
- Weight: 210 lb (95 kg; 15 st 0 lb)
- Position: Right wing
- Shot: Right
- Played for: SC Bern; Hamilton Bulldogs
- NHL draft: Undrafted
- Playing career: 2007–2022

Alain Berger (born December 27, 1990) is a Swiss former professional ice hockey forward who most notably played for SC Bern of the National League (NL).

== Playing career ==
Originally developing with SC Bern in Switzerland, Berger played two seasons of major junior hockey in the Ontario Hockey League with the Oshawa Generals, but was not drafted by a National Hockey League club. On April 8, 2011, the Montreal Canadiens signed Berger as a free agent to three-year entry-level contract.

Berger returned to play for SC Bern on December 11, 2012, after he was granted a release in the midst of his contract with the Canadiens.

On January 20, 2017, Berger was suspended for two games and fined CHF 2,420 for a hit to the head of EHC Kloten's Lukas Stoop.

On December 18, 2019, Berger agreed to an early two-year contract extension with SC Bern through the 2021–22 season.

== Personal ==
Alain is married to famous Canadian social media personality Sara McKim, who goes by Zar Ann on social media. They are happily married and have two children together.

== Career statistics ==
=== Regular season and playoffs ===
			Regular season					Playoffs
Season	Team	League	GP	G	A	Pts	PIM	GP	G	A	Pts	PIM
2007–08	Young Sprinters	NLB	20	2	3	5	22	—	—	—	—	—
2007–08	SC Bern	NLA	1	0	0	0	0	—	—	—	—	—
2008–09	Young Sprinters	NLB	26	9	10	19	38	—	—	—	—	—
2008–09	SC Bern	NLA	19	0	0	0	6	—	—	—	—	—
2009–10	Oshawa Generals	OHL	44	19	14	33	56	—	—	—	—	—
2010–11	Oshawa Generals	OHL	65	29	23	52	86	10	5	3	8	14
2011–12	Hamilton Bulldogs	AHL	47	1	6	7	17	—	—	—	—	—
2012–13	Hamilton Bulldogs	AHL	9	0	0	0	4	—	—	—	—	—
2012–13	SC Bern	NLA	20	2	2	4	8	20	2	1	3	10
2013–14	SC Bern	NLA	36	1	3	4	28	—	—	—	—	—
2014–15	SC Bern	NLA	50	8	11	19	26	11	0	0	0	4
2015–16	SC Bern	NLA	49	3	4	7	34	14	3	1	4	6
2016–17	SC Bern	NLA	46	3	7	10	49	16	1	0	1	6
2017–18	SC Bern	NL	39	2	7	9	8	11	0	0	0	14
2018–19	SC Bern	NL	50	2	3	5	28	17	0	2	2	10
2019–20	SC Bern	NL	50	2	1	3	20	—	—	—	—	—
2020–21	SC Bern	NL	42	1	1	2	32	9	0	0	0	0
2021–22	SC Bern	NL	48	1	1	2	4	—	—	—	—	—
NL totals			450	25	40	65	243	98	6	4	10	50

=== International ===
Year	Team	Event	Result	GP	G	A	Pts	PIM
2008	Switzerland	WJC18	8th	6	2	0	2	6
2009	Switzerland	WJC-D1	11th	5	1	1	2	6
Junior totals				11	3	1	4	12

== Awards and honours ==
Award	Year
NL
Champion (SC Bern)	2013, 2016, 2017, 2019
