= Kenny Ryan =

American ice hockey player (born 1991)

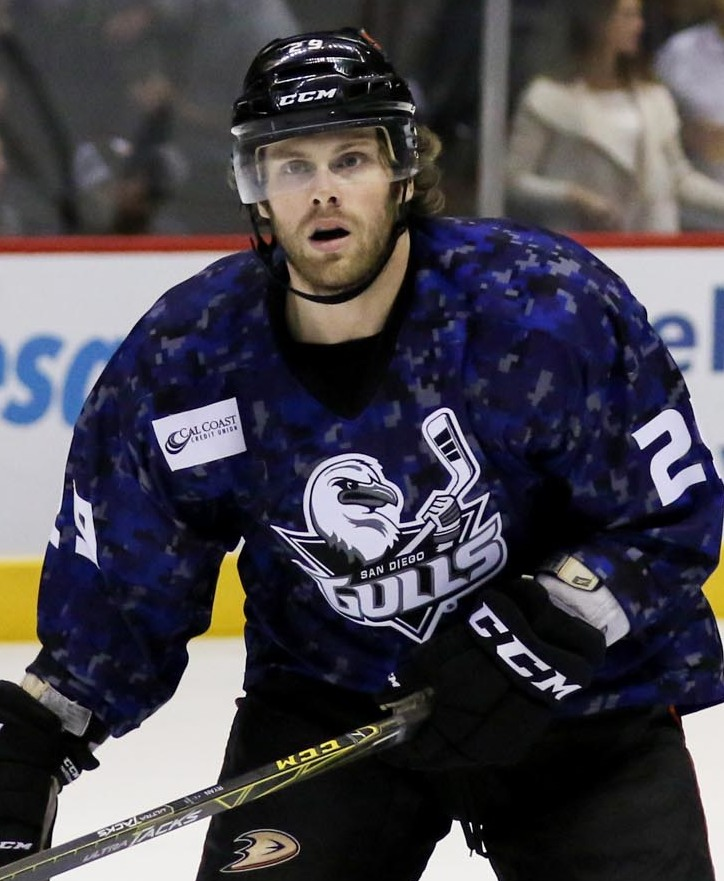
- Ryan with the San Diego Gulls in 2015
- Born: July 10, 1991 (age 35) Franklin, Michigan, U.S.
- Height: 6 ft 0 in (183 cm)
- Weight: 210 lb (95 kg; 15 st 0 lb)
- Position: Right wing
- Shot: Right
- Played for: Toronto Marlies; Lake Erie Monsters; San Diego Gulls; HC Thurgau
- NHL draft: 50th overall, 2009; Toronto Maple Leafs
- Playing career: 2011–2019

Kenneth Ryan (born July 10, 1991) is an American former professional ice hockey right winger. He was selected 50th overall by the Toronto Maple Leafs in the 2009 NHL entry draft.

== Playing career ==
Ryan played youth hockey for the USA Hockey National Team Development Program for two seasons beginning in 2007. He joined the team from the Honeybaked AAA development program. He made his Spitfires debut during the 2009-10 season. In the 2010-11 season, he recorded 58 points in 60 games played. He also collected 12 points in 18 playoff games.

Ryan was selected 50th overall by the Toronto Maple Leafs in the 2009 NHL entry draft.

On May 26, 2011 he signed a three-year entry-level contract with the Maple Leafs. During his first season with the Leafs' organization, Ryan divided his time between the team's AHL affiliate, the Toronto Marlies and their ECHL affiliate, the Reading Royals. Ryan spent the next two seasons playing exclusively for the Marlies. Following the end of the 2013–14 season, the Leafs did not make a qualifying offer to Ryan and as a result he became an unrestricted free agent on July 1, 2014.

Unsigned throughout the off-season, Ryan accepted an invitation to attend the Colorado Avalanche 2014 training camp on a professional try-out contract on September 18, 2014. He was later reassigned to AHL affiliate, the Lake Erie Monsters training camp, where he made the team's opening night roster. In the 2014–15 season, Ryan's versatility was relied upon across the line-up in appearing in a career high 73 games for a professional best of 17 assists and 29 points.

Lingering as an unsigned free agent after the off-season, Ryan agreed to a try-out to attend the Anaheim Ducks 2015 training camp. At the conclusion of training camp, Ryan was assigned and agreed to a contract with AHL affiliate, the San Diego Gulls, on September 28, 2015.

On August 10, 2016, as a free agent, Ryan opted to continue his career in the third tier ECHL, signing a one-year deal with the Cincinnati Cyclones. In the 2016–17 season, Ryan appeared in 18 games with 13 points for the Cyclones, before he was recalled and returned with the San Diego Gulls on November 29, 2016. His ECHL rights were traded to the Gulls ECHL affiliate and former club the Utah Grizzlies. After 8 games with the Gulls, Ryan was released from his try-out and was traded twice more in the ECHL between the Grizzlies and Reading Royals before ending up with the Indy Fuel on February 7, 2017.

Ryan extended his playing career in the off-season by agreeing to a one-year deal with the Wheeling Nailers of the ECHL on August 28, 2017.

After playing his first 7 professional seasons in North America, Ryan left as a free agent in agreeing to a one-year deal with HC Thurgau of the second tier Swiss League, on July 6, 2018.

== Personal life ==
Ryan was born and raised in Franklin Village, Michigan where he grew up next door to Colorado Avalanche defenseman Jack Johnson.

Ryan has two older brothers; Ross (graduate of University of Michigan School of Dentistry) and Charles (part of the Global Risk Management Associate Program at Bank of America).

== Career statistics ==
=== Regular season and playoffs ===
			Regular season					Playoffs
Season	Team	League	GP	G	A	Pts	PIM	GP	G	A	Pts	PIM
2007–08	U.S. National Under-18 Team	NAHL	36	10	8	18	53	—	—	—	—	—
2008–09	U.S. National Under-18 Team	NAHL	16	4	9	13	12	—	—	—	—	—
2008–09	U.S. National Under-18 Team	Ind	62	27	22	49	50	—	—	—	—	—
2009–10	Windsor Spitfires	OHL	52	14	21	35	33	19	3	2	5	14
2010–11	Windsor Spitfires	OHL	60	21	37	58	42	18	4	8	12	25
2011–12	Toronto Marlies	AHL	16	1	0	1	9	—	—	—	—	—
2011–12	Reading Royals	ECHL	32	13	10	23	18	5	3	2	5	27
2012–13	Toronto Marlies	AHL	59	9	12	21	38	9	0	0	0	13
2013–14	Toronto Marlies	AHL	50	5	11	16	60	14	1	4	5	2
2014–15	Lake Erie Monsters	AHL	73	12	17	29	34	—	—	—	—	—
2015–16	San Diego Gulls	AHL	41	6	4	10	10	2	0	0	0	0
2015–16	Utah Grizzlies	ECHL	2	2	1	3	0	—	—	—	—	—
2016–17	Cincinnati Cyclones	ECHL	18	6	7	13	18	—	—	—	—	—
2016–17	San Diego Gulls	AHL	8	2	1	3	2	—	—	—	—	—
2016–17	Indy Fuel	ECHL	26	7	13	20	10	—	—	—	—	—
2017–18	Wheeling Nailers	ECHL	9	7	3	10	0	—	—	—	—	—
2018–19	HC Thurgau	SL	38	21	7	28	12	10	3	4	7	27
AHL totals			247	35	45	80	153	25	1	4	5	15

=== International ===
Year	Team	Event	Result	GP	G	A	Pts	PIM
2008	United States	U17	2nd place, silver medalist(s)	6	1	2	3	6
2009	United States	U18	1st place, gold medalist(s)	7	4	1	5	6
Junior totals				13	5	3	8	12
