= Joey Hishon =

Canadian ice hockey player (born 1991)

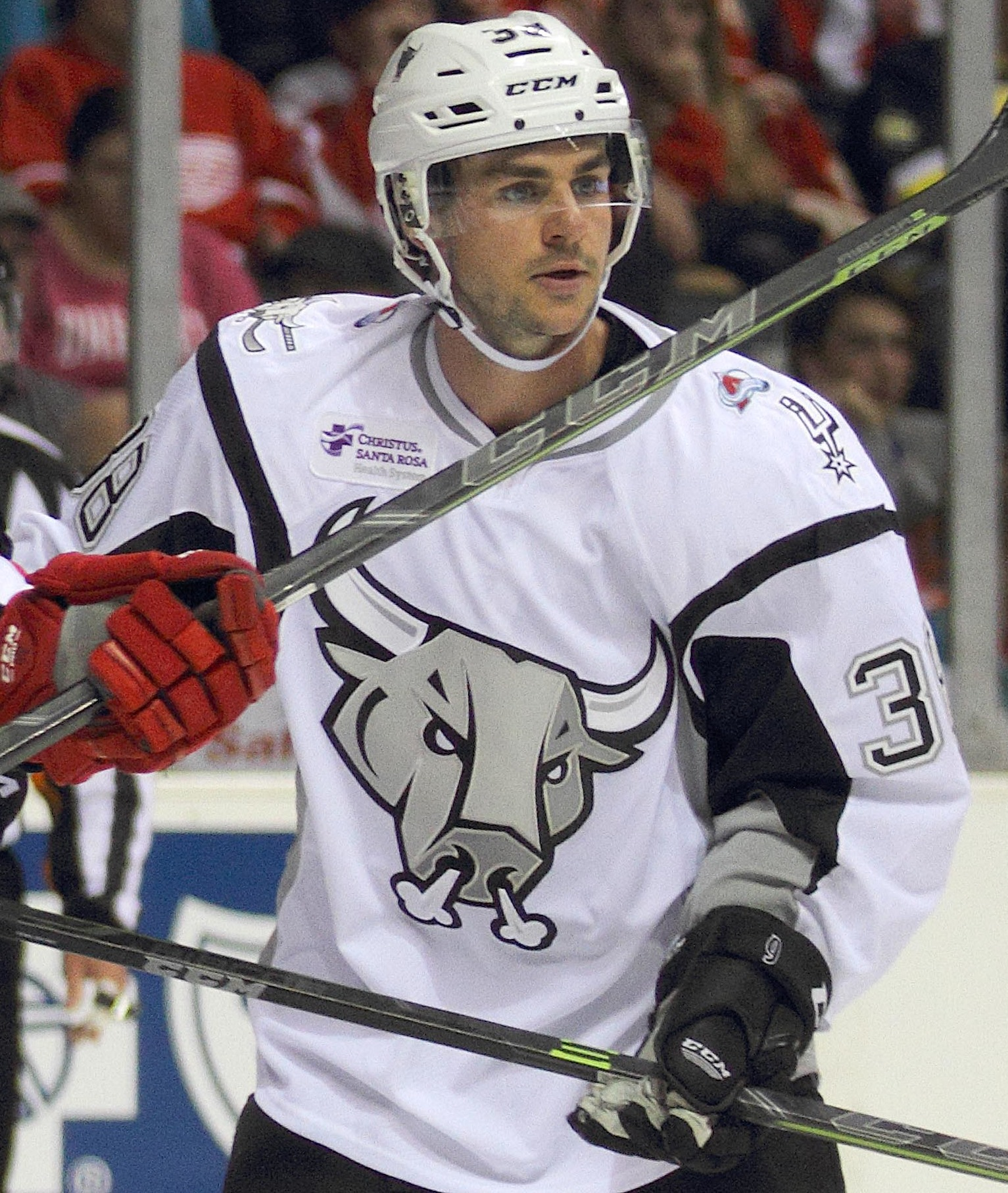
- Hishon with the San Antonio Rampage in 2015
- Born: October 20, 1991 (age 35) Stratford, Ontario, Canada
- Height: 5 ft 10 in (178 cm)
- Weight: 170 lb (77 kg; 12 st 2 lb)
- Position: Centre
- Shot: Left
- Played for: Colorado Avalanche; Jokerit; Luleå HF
- NHL draft: 17th overall, 2010; Colorado Avalanche
- Playing career: 2013–2018

Joey Hishon (born October 20, 1991) is a Canadian former professional ice hockey centre who played in the National Hockey League (NHL) with the Colorado Avalanche. Hishon was drafted by the Avalanche in the first-round 17th overall in the 2010 NHL entry draft. With his career hampered by a long-term concussion, Hishon played within the Avalanche organization for four seasons and a combined total of only sixteen games before spending two years abroad in the Kontinental Hockey League (KHL) and Swedish Hockey League (SHL) to complete his playing career.

== Playing career ==
=== Junior ===
Hishon began his minor hockey career with the Stratford Minor Hockey Association, graduating in 2006-07 from the Stratford AA Midget Warriors of the Ontario Minor Hockey Association before he was selected 8th overall in the first round of the 2007 Ontario Hockey League draft by the Owen Sound Attack. In his first season with the Attack in 2007–08, Joey impressively finished second on the team with 47 points in 63 games as the youngest on the team. In the 2008–09 he returned Owen Sound to the Playoffs leading the team in scoring with 37 goals, 44 assists for 81 points. Selected to play in the OHL All-Star Classic for the Western Team he was also voted at season's end as the Best Playmaker and Best Stickhandler in the OHL's Western Conference by the league's coaches.

Hishon was limited to just 36 games in an injury plagued 2009–10 season. Despite missing two months due to a broken foot and MCL sprain he still managed to put better than point per game numbers with 40 and was awarded the Attack's Harold Sutherland Cup for top draft prospect, eligible for the 2010 NHL entry draft. With a fallen ranking of 55th by the NHL's Central Scouting Final grades, Hishon was surprisingly taken in the first round, 17th overall, by the Colorado Avalanche. He was the first Stratford minor hockey league player to be picked in the first round since Craig Hartsburg in 1979.

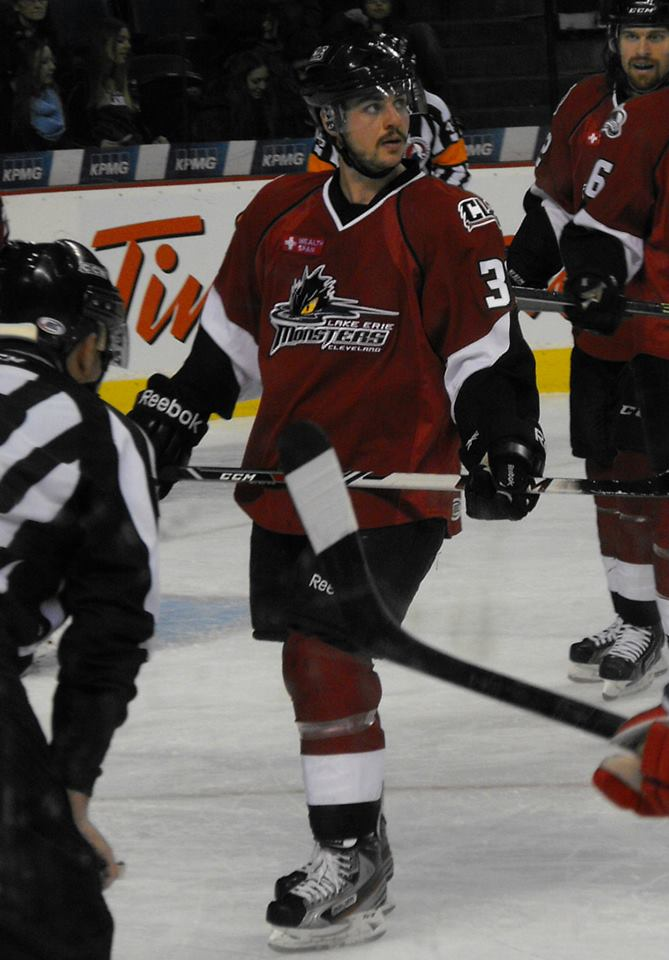
Hishon with Lake Erie Monsters (2013).

Hishon was instrumental in helping the Attack to the J. Ross Robertson Cup as OHL Champions. During the course of the 2010-11 OHL season, on March 13, 2011, Hishon was signed to a three-year entry-level contract with the Avalanche.

During the 2011 Memorial Cup, Hishon was struck by an illegal elbow blow to the head by Kootenay Ice defenceman (and Buffalo Sabres prospect) Brayden McNabb, which left Hishon with a concussion; Hishon missed the rest of the Memorial Cup and the entire 2011–12 hockey season with post-concussion syndrome. In part due to this hit, Hockey Canada redefined the rules to make clearer a zero-tolerance policy for head hits.

=== Professional ===
==== Colorado Avalanche ====
Hishon's recovery extended into the following 2012–13 season, before he was belatedly cleared for non-contact practice with the Avalanche's AHL affiliate, the Lake Erie Monsters, to begin the new year. Hishon was finally scheduled to make his long-awaited professional debut with the Monsters against the Toronto Marlies on March 19, 2013. It marked a return from his concussion just two months shy of two years. In his fifth game, Hishon scored his first professional goal in a multi-point effort against the Chicago Wolves on March 29, 2013. However, on April 12, in his ninth game and on his first shift against the Hamilton Bulldogs, Hishon's season was ended after he suffered a second concussion received in a hit from behind by Joey Tenute. With an early prognosis of a less severe concussion than previously endured, it was anticipated Hishon would recover in time to prepare for the following season.

Hishon played for the majority of the 2013–14 season scoring 10 goals and 24 points despite missing 26 games due to injury. He was an emergency call-up during the first round of the 2014 Stanley Cup Playoffs, debuting in Game Four against the Minnesota Wild. At the end of the season, the Avalanche gave him a qualifying offer of $900,000, and he was reportedly signed to a one-year two-way contract paying $850,000 in the NHL.

In the 2014–15 season, Hishon again played primarily for the Lake Erie Monsters in the AHL, playing 53 games and scoring 16 goals and 36 points. In March 2015, Hishon was called up to the Colorado Avalanche. He scored his first NHL goal on April 7, 2015, against goaltender Pekka Rinne of the Nashville Predators. In the summer of 2015, Hishon signed a one-year two-way contract paying $890,000 in the NHL. In the 2015–16 campaign, he made 62 appearances for Colorado's AHL affiliate, the San Antonio Rampage, unable to earn a recall to the NHL for the duration of the season.

==== Europe ====
On May 2, 2016, as an impending restricted free agent with the Avalanche, Hishon opted to embark on a European career, signing two-year deal with Finnish club, Jokerit, who compete in the Kontinental Hockey League. In the 2016-17 season, Hishon struggled to adapt with Jokerit in the KHL, contributing while playing through injury with just 3 goals and 9 points in 48 games.

In the off-season, Hishon was mutually released from the remaining year of his contract with Jokerit and subsequently signed a one-year deal with Swedish top-tier club, Luleå HF of the Swedish Hockey League on June 14, 2017. In the 2017–18 season, Hishon was unable to perform to his full capabilities through injury in recording 2 goals and 4 points in 22 regular season games.

As a free agent, Hishon opted to end his professional career, opting to return to the junior ranks as a scouting and skills development coach with former club, the Owen Sound Attack of the OHL, on July 20, 2018.

== International play ==
Hishon made his international debut at the 2008 World U-17 Hockey Challenge. He scored 5 points in 6 games to help Team Ontario to a gold medal. In 2009, he was selected to represent Team Canada at the IIHF World U18 Championships and was the team's leading scorer with 5 goals and 10 points in a fourth-placed finish.

During the 2010–11 season, Hishon was invited to take part in Canada's National Junior Team selection camp for the 2011 World Junior Championships in Buffalo, New York, before he was included among the first cuts of the camp.

== Career statistics ==
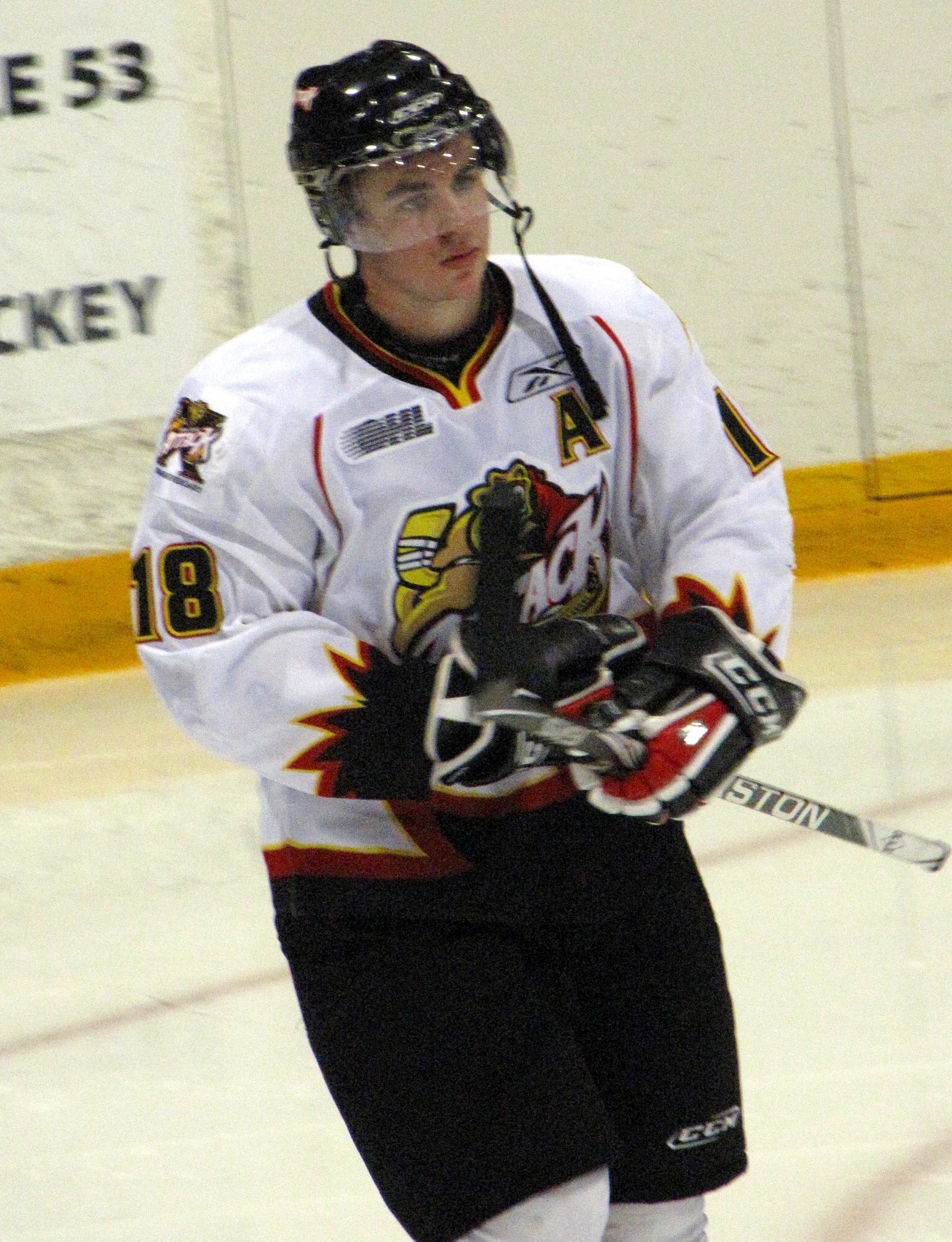
Hishon with the Owen Sound Attack in 2009

=== Regular season and playoffs ===
			Regular season					Playoffs
Season	Team	League	GP	G	A	Pts	PIM	GP	G	A	Pts	PIM
2006–07	Stratford Warriors AA	Midget	50	44	42	86	114	—	—	—	—	—
2007–08	Owen Sound Attack	OHL	63	20	27	47	38	—	—	—	—	—
2008–09	Owen Sound Attack	OHL	65	37	44	81	34	4	4	3	7	6
2009–10	Owen Sound Attack	OHL	36	16	24	40	26	—	—	—	—	—
2010–11	Owen Sound Attack	OHL	50	37	50	87	64	22	5	19	24	32
2012–13	Lake Erie Monsters	AHL	9	1	5	6	2	—	—	—	—	—
2013–14	Lake Erie Monsters	AHL	50	10	14	24	16	—	—	—	—	—
2013–14	Colorado Avalanche	NHL	—	—	—	—	—	3	0	1	1	2
2014–15	Lake Erie Monsters	AHL	53	16	20	36	34	—	—	—	—	—
2014–15	Colorado Avalanche	NHL	13	1	1	2	0	—	—	—	—	—
2015–16	San Antonio Rampage	AHL	62	14	29	43	62	—	—	—	—	—
2016–17	Jokerit	KHL	48	3	6	9	68	1	0	0	0	2
2017–18	Luleå HF	SHL	22	2	2	4	20	3	0	2	2	0
NHL totals			13	1	1	2	0	3	0	1	1	2

=== International ===
Year	Team	Event	Result	GP	G	A	Pts	PIM
2008	Canada Ontario	U17	1st place, gold medalist(s)	6	2	3	5	14
2009	Canada	WJC18	4th	6	5	5	10	0
Junior totals				12	7	8	15	14

Awards and achievements
Preceded by Matt Duchene	Colorado Avalanche first-round draft pick 2010	Succeeded by Gabriel Landeskog
