= Tyler Brown (ice hockey) =

Canadian ice hockey player

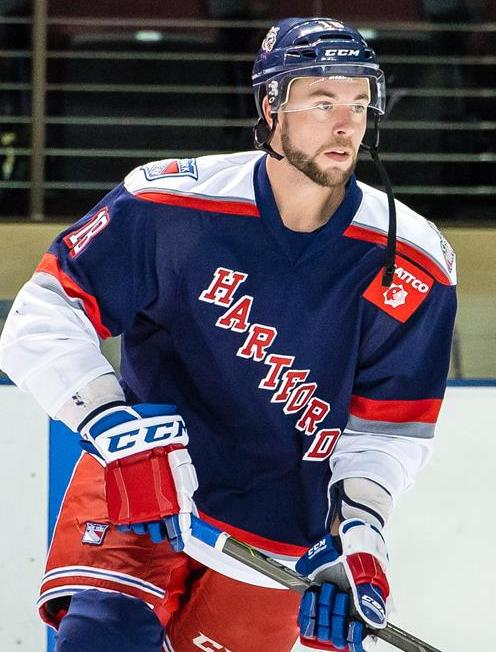
- Brown with the Hartford Wolf Pack in 2015
- Born: February 7, 1990 (age 36) Wasaga Beach, Ontario, Canada
- Height: 6 ft 1 in (185 cm)
- Weight: 194 lb (88 kg; 13 st 12 lb)
- Position: Left wing
- Shot: Left
- Played for: Adirondack Phantoms; Hartford Wolf Pack
- NHL draft: Undrafted
- Playing career: 2011–2019

Tyler G. Brown (born February 7, 1990) is a Canadian former professional ice hockey left winger. He most notably played in the American Hockey League (AHL) with the Adirondack Phantoms and the Hartford Wolf Pack.

== Playing career ==
Undrafted, Brown played major junior hockey with the Plymouth Whalers in the Ontario Hockey League before he was signed as a free agent to a three-year, entry-level contract with the Philadelphia Flyers on March 3, 2011.

Following the 2013–14 season, the Flyers did not tender Brown a qualifying offer, leaving him as an unrestricted free agent. On September 5, 2014, the Greenville Road Warriors announced they had signed him to an ECHL contract. He called up for Rangers on March 3 2016 at penguins he was healthy scratch did not backup that Night sent down to AHL Post game After two seasons in the American Hockey League with the Hartford Wolf Pack, Brown returned to Greenville as a free agent, signing a one-year deal with the Swamp Rabbits on September 12, 2016.

Following the 2016–17 season, Brown opted to continue in the ECHL, returning within the Philadelphia Flyers affiliate's with the Reading Royals on September 28, 2017.

For the 2018-19 season, Brown re-signed with the Reading Royals on August 17, 2018. He was also named player-assistant coach.

== Post-career ==
In 2019, Brown alongside his brother Cody Brown founded Brown Hockey Academy.

== Career statistics ==
			Regular season					Playoffs
Season	Team	League	GP	G	A	Pts	PIM	GP	G	A	Pts	PIM
2007–08	Plymouth Whalers	OHL	38	1	5	6	13	3	0	1	1	2
2008–09	Plymouth Whalers	OHL	49	8	13	21	18	11	1	2	3	0
2009–10	Plymouth Whalers	OHL	66	14	25	39	28	9	2	1	3	2
2010–11	Plymouth Whalers	OHL	67	25	34	59	44	11	3	11	14	8
2011–12	Adirondack Phantoms	AHL	71	8	9	17	28	—	—	—	—	—
2012–13	Adirondack Phantoms	AHL	55	3	3	6	30	—	—	—	—	—
2013–14	Adirondack Phantoms	AHL	56	3	6	9	14	—	—	—	—	—
2014–15	Greenville Road Warriors	ECHL	33	12	6	18	12	—	—	—	—	—
2014–15	Hartford Wolf Pack	AHL	37	7	7	14	10	15	1	1	2	2
2015–16	Hartford Wolf Pack	AHL	65	4	9	13	20	—	—	—	—	—
2016–17	Greenville Swamp Rabbits	ECHL	48	4	17	21	18	6	3	1	4	0
2017–18	Reading Royals	ECHL	50	5	9	14	21	4	0	0	0	4
2018–19	Reading Royals	ECHL	56	11	4	15	31	—	—	—	—	—
AHL totals			284	25	34	59	102	15	1	1	2	2
