= Jason Wilson (ice hockey) =

Canadian ice hockey player (born 1990)

- Born: April 15, 1990 (age 36) Richmond Hill, Ontario, Canada
- Height: 6 ft 2 in (188 cm)
- Weight: 205 lb (93 kg; 14 st 9 lb)
- Position: Left wing
- Shoots: Left
- ECHL team Former teams: Atlanta Gladiators; Connecticut Whale
- NHL draft: 130th overall, 2010; New York Rangers
- Playing career: 2011–present

Jason Wilson (born April 15, 1990) is a Canadian professional ice hockey player. He is currently playing with the Atlanta Gladiators of the ECHL. Wilson was selected by the New York Rangers in the 5th round (130th overall) of the 2010 NHL entry draft.

Wilson played three seasons (2008–2011) of major junior hockey in the Ontario Hockey League (OHL) where he scored 95 points and registered 299 penalty minutes in 162 games played.

On May 12, 2011, the New York Rangers signed Wilson to a three-year entry-level contract. Wilson became an unrestricted free agent on July 1, 2014, after the Rangers did not extend a qualifying offer to him.

On September 3, 2014, the Florida Everblades announced that they had signed him to a one-year contract. He was traded to the Gwinnett Gladiators on March 12, 2015.
