= Roman Berdnikov (ice hockey) =

Russian ice hockey player

- Born: July 18, 1992 (age 32); Omsk, Russia
- Height: 6 ft 1 in (185 cm)
- Weight: 187 lb (85 kg; 13 st 5 lb)
- Position: Forward
- Shoots: Right
- KHL team Former teams: Severstal Cherepovets; Avangard Omsk; Metallurg Novokuznetsk
- NHL draft: Undrafted
- Playing career: 2011–present

Roman Berdnikov (Russian: Роман Бердников; born July 18, 1992) is a Russian professional ice hockey forward playing with the Severstal Cherepovets of the Kontinental Hockey League (KHL).

Berdnikov made his Kontinental Hockey League debut with Avangard Omsk during the 2011–12 KHL season.
