= Matt Petgrave =

Canadian professional ice hockey winger

- Born: January 29, 1992 (age 34) Toronto, Ontario, Canada
- Height: 6 ft 1 in (185 cm)
- Weight: 189 lb (86 kg; 13 st 7 lb)
- Position: Left wing
- Shoots: Left
- ECHL team Former teams: Indy Fuel; Laval Rocket; Belleville Senators; Syracuse Crunch; Utica Comets; HK Spišská Nová Ves; HC Pardubice; Sheffield Steelers
- NHL draft: Undrafted
- Playing career: 2008–present

Matthew Petgrave (born January 29, 1992) is a Canadian professional ice hockey player who is a left winger for the Indy Fuel of the ECHL. He is a former ECHL First-Team All-Star and he has played in the highest national leagues in Slovakia, Czech Republic, and the United Kingdom. Petgrave goes by the nickname "Gravy". On October 28, 2023, he was involved in an on-ice collision that led to Petgrave's skate blade cutting the neck of Adam Johnson of the Nottingham Panthers; Johnson died as a result of the injuries he sustained in the collision.

== Early life ==
Petgrave was born in Toronto, Ontario, Canada.

== Playing career ==
=== Junior and collegiate ===
Petgrave started his hockey career in Canada with the Bramalea Blues of the Ontario Junior Hockey League. He debuted in the Ontario Hockey League with the Niagara IceDogs where he played in 67 games and scored 25 points.

In the 2010–11 and 2011–12 seasons, he played with the Owen Sound Attack, and midway through the 2011–12 season, he transferred to the Oshawa Generals, where he played until 2013. With the Attack, he recorded 62 points in 98 games across two seasons, and for the Generals he achieved 70 points in 78 games across two seasons. In 2011, he was the Player of the Week in the Ontario Hockey League. With the Generals, Petgrave suffered a broken wrist and missed a considerable number of games, which may have cost him an opportunity for an NHL contract.

Petgrave played collegiate hockey for the University of New Brunswick's UNB Reds from 2013 to 2016, before turning professional.

=== Professional ===
Petgrave's first full season as a professional hockey player was during 2017–18 when he played for the Brampton Beast of the East Coast Hockey League (ECHL). Petgrave developed a reputation for his effective defensive play and adept skating ability. He represented the North Division in the ECHL All-Star game on January 15, 2018. He signed several professional tryout contracts with the Toronto Marlies of the American Hockey League during the 2017–18 season, but he was returned to Brampton. With Brampton, Petgrave was fined and suspended from play indefinitely as result of an in-game action against the Kalamazoo Wings on April 7, 2018.

Petgrave again played for Brampton in the 2018–19 season. At season end he was named an ECHL First-Team All-Star after recording eight goals, 32 assists, and 40 points in 50 games.

Petgrave spent the majority of the 2019–20 season with the Brampton Beast. In 41 appearances with Brampton, Petgrave totalled 33 points with seven goals and 26 assists and had a plus-minus of five.

He signed with the Florida Everblades of the ECHL in December 2020. He totalled 7 goals, 26 assists, and 33 points in 44 games for the Everblades in the 2020–21 season.

In 2021–22, he played a season in Slovakia for HK Spišská Nová Ves, and was the second most penalized player in the league. In 2021–22, he played nine games in the Czech Republic for HC Dynamo Pardubice. From 2022 to 2023, he played for the Sheffield Steelers in the United Kingdom's Elite Ice Hockey League (EIHL). In the 2022–23 season, he was the most penalized player in the EIHL.

==== Involvement in the death of Adam Johnson ====
On October 28, 2023, only 7 games into the 2023–24 EIHL season, Adam Johnson of the Nottingham Panthers sustained a fatal injury when his throat was cut by Petgrave's skate during an on-ice collision in a game against the Sheffield Steelers. A video of the incident showed Petgrave's left skate kick up towards Johnson as Petgrave began to fall after colliding with another Panthers player. The South Yorkshire Police opened an investigation into the death and arrested Petgrave on suspicion of manslaughter before releasing him on bail. On November 12, 2023, Petgrave received a standing ovation at his team's first home game since the incident, albeit Petgrave did not feature in his team's roster for the game. Petgrave, who is black, was subject to online racial attacks in the aftermath of the incident.

Over the course of a lengthy investigation, Petgrave was re-bailed several times by the British legal system and required crowdfunding support for his legal costs. On April 29, 2025, the Crown Prosecution Service announced that no charges would be brought against Petgrave as there was no realistic prospect of a conviction, and closed the case.

==== Hiatus and return ====
Following Johnson's death, Petgrave did not play while on bail, resulting in him missing the remainder of the 2023–24 season and the entirety of the 2024–25 ice hockey season, due to the expiry of his visa to play in the United Kingdom. On September 18, 2025, Petgrave was signed by the Indy Fuel of the ECHL, returning to professional play ahead of the 2025–26 ECHL season.

== Honours and awards ==
Award	Year	Ref.
ECHL
All-Star Game	2018–19	
First-Team All-Star	2019–20	

== See also ==
- Ice hockey in the United Kingdom
- Penalty (ice hockey)
- Violence in ice hockey
