= Mark Scheifele =

Canadian ice hockey player (born 1993)

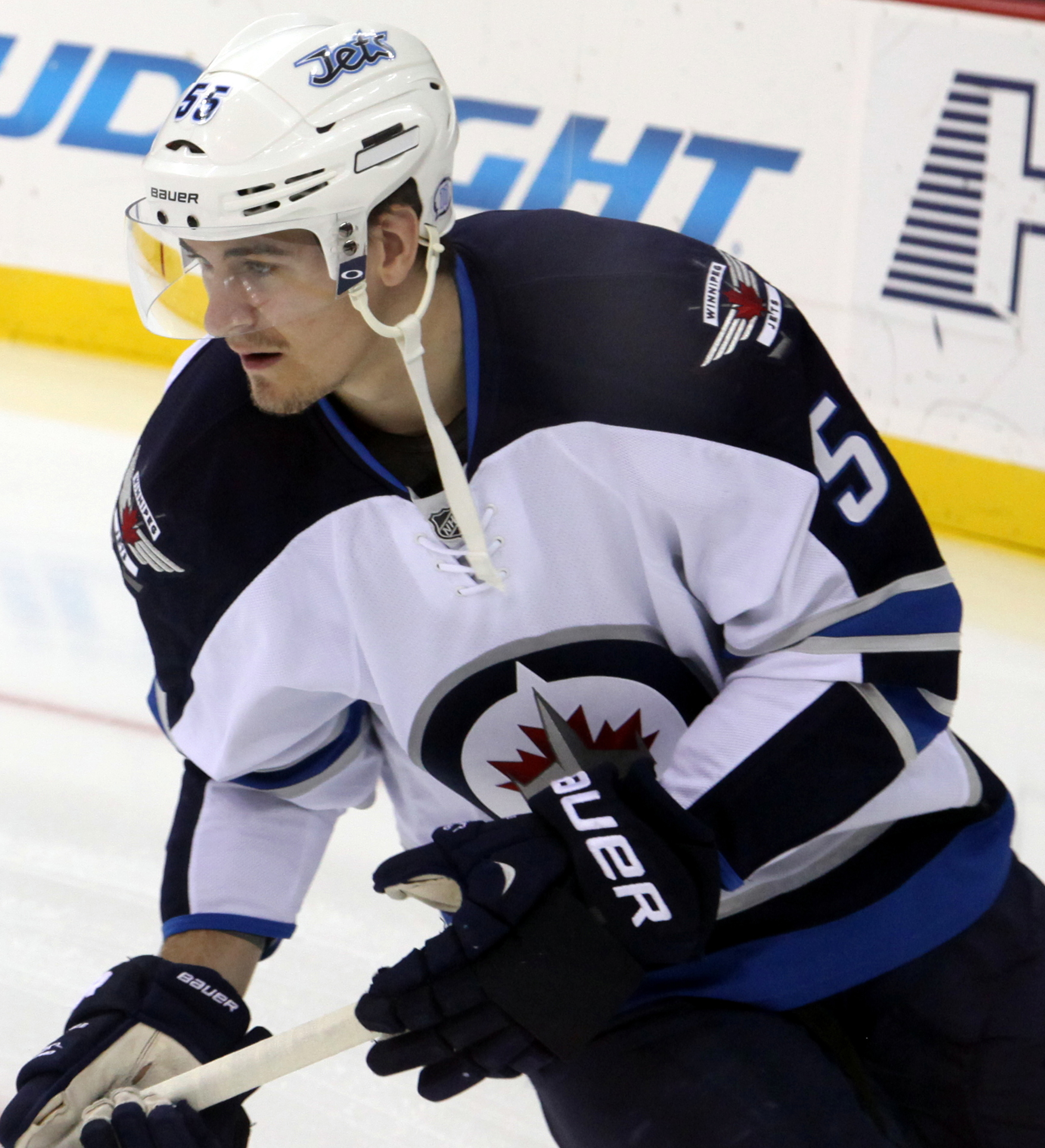
- Scheifele with the Winnipeg Jets in 2014
- Born: March 15, 1993 (age 33) Kitchener, Ontario, Canada
- Height: 6 ft 3 in (191 cm)
- Weight: 207 lb (94 kg; 14 st 11 lb)
- Position: Centre
- Shoots: Right
- NHL team: Winnipeg Jets
- National team: Canada
- NHL draft: 7th overall, 2011; Winnipeg Jets
- Playing career: 2011–present

Mark Scheifele (/ˈʃaɪfli/ SHY-flee; born March 15, 1993) is a Canadian professional ice hockey player who is a centre and alternate captain for the Winnipeg Jets of the National Hockey League (NHL). He was selected by the Jets in the first round, seventh overall, of the 2011 NHL entry draft, becoming the Jets' first-ever draft pick after relocating from Atlanta. He holds the Winnipeg Jets franchise record for goals, assists, and points.

Scheifele grew up playing minor ice hockey in his hometown of Kitchener, Ontario, playing for the Kitchener Jr. Rangers rep program in the Alliance Pavilion League. After his minor midget season in 2008–09, Scheifele was drafted by the Ontario Hockey League (OHL)'s Saginaw Spirit in the seventh round of the 2009 OHL Priority Selection. His rights were later traded to the Barrie Colts and he was drafted seventh overall by the Winnipeg Jets. Scheifele played his first full NHL campaign during the 2013–14 season.

Throughout his tenure with the Jets, Scheifele has helped lead the team offensively and has served as a leader in the dressing room. During the 2015–16 season, he surpassed the 20-goal mark for the first time in his professional career and scored his first NHL hat-trick. As a result, he finished the regular season with a then-career high 61 points in 71 games and led the team in goals. He followed that season up by leading the Jets in scoring and finished seventh in the league with 82 points in 79 games.

Scheifele has competed for Team Canada at both the junior and national level at international tournaments. After making his senior debut at the 2014 IIHF World Championship, Scheifele won his first IIHF World Championship gold medal in 2016 and was named his hometown's Athlete of the Year.

== Early life ==
Scheifele was born on March 15, 1993, in Kitchener, Ontario, Canada, to parents Brad and Mary Lou. His father played gridiron in high school and Brad's brother, Kyle, helped lead the football team for four years at the University of Guelph. As the youngest of three siblings, Scheifele, who identifies as a devout Christian, was raised in a Christian family and attended Grandview Baptist Kitchener every Sunday.

== Playing career ==
=== Amateur ===
Scheifele grew up playing minor hockey in his hometown of Kitchener, Ontario, playing for the Kitchener Jr. Rangers rep program in the Alliance Pavilion League. Scheifele originally played as a defenceman before being moved to a forward position. While playing minor hockey, Scheifele said he wore the number 55 because he wanted to be like his older brother Kyle. He attended Grand River Collegiate Institute for high school, during which he competitively played volleyball, basketball, badminton, and track and field. Scheifele only began to specifically focus on hockey when he was 16 years old. After his minor midget season in 2008–09, Scheifele was drafted by the Ontario Hockey League (OHL)'s Saginaw Spirit in the seventh round of the 2009 OHL Priority Selection. However, he failed to make their roster and was assigned to his hometown Kitchener Dutchmen Jr.B. club for a year of seasoning in the Greater Ontario Junior Hockey League (OHA). During his time with the Dutchmen, he began to be noticed by universities and offered NCAA scholarships. Although he originally committed to play for the Cornell Big Red men's ice hockey team, he opted to forgo his commitment to play in the OHL.

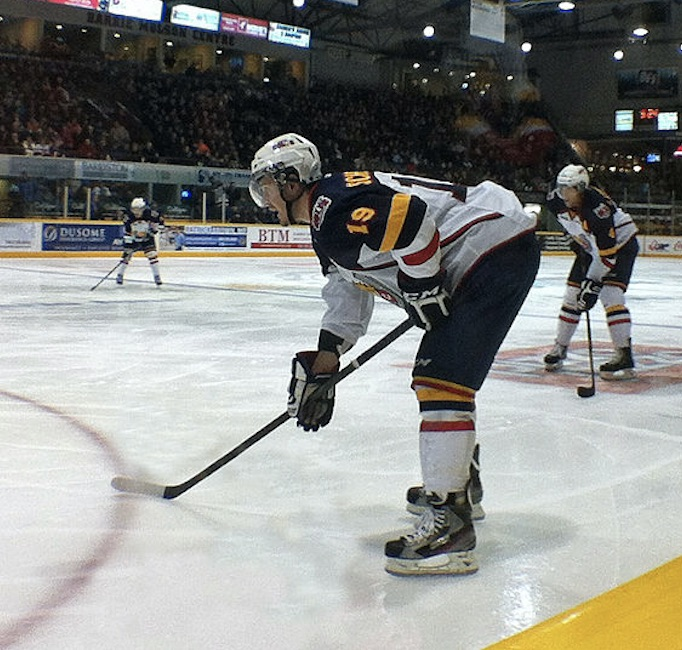
Scheifele with the Colts in November 2012

Following the 2009–10 season, Scheifele's playing rights were traded by the Spirit (along with a second-round choice in 2013) to the Barrie Colts in exchange for goaltender Mavric Parks. Early in his rookie season with the Colts, Scheifele was awarded the OHL's Central Division Academic Award for the month of October and ranked second on the team in scoring. He was subsequently invited to the 2010 CHL/NHL Top Prospects Game at the WFCU Centre. Prior to the 2011 NHL entry draft, Scheifele was ranked 19th overall amongst OHL prospects and 16th among North American skaters by the NHL Central Scouting Bureau. Ultimately, he was selected seventh overall by the Winnipeg Jets, the organization's first draft pick since relocating to Winnipeg from Atlanta.

=== Professional ===
Scheifele attended the Winnipeg Jets training camp prior to the 2011–12 season and played in their exhibition games. He also announced he would wear the jersey number 55 since his favourite number 19 was taken by Jim Slater. During the pre-season, he scored two goals and two assists in an exhibition game against the Columbus Blue Jackets, earning the first star. On October 3, 2011, the Jets announced that they had signed Scheifele to an entry-level contract, and that he would start the season on Winnipeg's NHL roster. Scheifele subsequently made his NHL debut on October 6, 2011, and scored his first career NHL goal on October 19, 2011, against James Reimer of the Toronto Maple Leafs. After playing in seven games, he was re-assigned to the OHL and rejoined the Barrie Colts to continue his development.

After the Colts were eliminated from the OHL playoff race, he was called up by the Jets to play for their American Hockey League (AHL) affiliate, the St. John's IceCaps for the 2012 Calder Cup playoffs. In September, he was named an assistant captain on the Colts, alongside Alex Lepkowski and Steven Beyers. Scheifele participated in the Jets' training camp ahead of the 2012–13 season, and played in four games with the team, before being sent back down to the Colts. Scheifele remained with the Colts for the duration of the season, recording 79 points in 45 regular season games. During the OHL playoffs, he recorded 39 points in 19 games, including four goals in Game 4 against the London Knights to nearly qualify for the Memorial Cup. However, during the following game, Scheifele was bodychecked by the London Knights' Josh Anderson and was unable to play in Game 7.

For the 2013–14 season, Scheifele played in all 60 of Winnipeg's regular season games up to the NHL break for the 2014 Winter Olympics. During the season, he cemented his role as a top-six forward centering the Jets' second line, however, on March 4, 2014, in a game against the New York Islanders, Scheifele suffered a knee injury that forced him to miss the remainder of the regular season. He recovered during the offseason and was medically cleared to play for the Jets' training camp and 2014–15 season. He played in all 82 games during the season and recorded 49 points in 81 games. During the 2014–15 offseason, Scheifele used DNA testing to increase his muscle mass and he arrived at the Jets' training camp 11 pounds (5.0 kg) heavier than the previous season.

Prior to the 2015–16 season, Scheifele was placed on the second-line centre role with Nikolaj Ehlers and Mathieu Perreault and remained there for most of the season. By November, he recorded four goals and four assists and won 44 per cent of his face offs. Despite suffering a head injury in December, he surpassed the 20-goal mark for the first time in his professional career. After Bryan Little fractured a vertebra, Scheifele was promoted to the Jets' top line where he recorded eight goals and 13 points in nine games. During the second half of the season, he scored his first NHL hat-trick in a contest against the Montreal Canadiens on March 5, 2016, thus ending the teams' three-game losing streak. Scheifele finished the regular season with a career high 61 points in 71 games although the Jets failed to make the postseason. After the season, Scheifele signed an eight-year, $49 million contract to remain with the Winnipeg Jets. One of his reasons for staying was that Dustin Byfuglien also remained on the team.

Following the signing of his contract, Scheifele was named an alternate captain for the 2016–17 season alongside Byfuglien and captain Blake Wheeler. Jets head coach Paul Maurice praised his leadership ability, saying "Mark Scheifele is going to be the captain of this hockey team at some point in his career for sure." At the time, the current captain Blake Wheeler had two years left in his contract. Scheifele led the Jets in scoring and finished seventh in the league with 82 points in 79 games. Following his break-out season, Scheifele acknowledged there was increased pressure on the team to qualify for the Stanley Cup playoffs after missing it the past two years. With high expectations coming into the 2017–18 season, Scheifele recorded 60 points in 60 games despite missing 22 due to injuries. During the 2018 Stanley Cup playoffs, Scheifele set a new NHL record for most road goals in a postseason. By the time he played Game 3 of the Western Conference Final against the Vegas Golden Knights, he had recorded 14 goals in total, 11 of which were on the road. The previous record was held by Joe Mullen and Sidney Crosby, who scored 10 times on the road during Stanley Cup runs for the Calgary Flames and Pittsburgh Penguins, respectively. Scheifele also tied Washington Capitals captain Alexander Ovechkin for the NHL lead in road playoff goals during the past two postseasons.

In an effort to continue his scoring prowess, Scheifele hired a personal chef and met with Tom Brady's former chef Allen Campbell to "discuss food theory and write up a meal plan." He was influenced by former NHL player Gary Roberts to change up his diet which included eliminating gluten and dairy. He also trained with teammate Blake Wheeler during the summer to build chemistry. Scheifele arrived at the Jets' training camp prior to the 2018–19 season calling the Jets "a powerhouse in the West." During the 2018–19 season, Scheifele set new career highs in goals, assists, and points. By December, he was named NHL's First Star of the Week after recording a five-game point streak thus trying for tenth amongst the league leader in points. In the same month, he was selected for his first NHL All-Star Game alongside Wheeler after he recorded 49 points to rank 11th in the league. On January 18, 2019, he was high sticked by Nashville Predators forward Ryan Johansen who was subsequently suspended for two games. The Jets finished second in the Central Division but lost in their first round series against the St. Louis Blues, who went on to win their first Stanley Cup.

Scheifele rejoined the team for the 2019–20 season, which would be unexpectedly paused due to the COVID-19 pandemic in March. He also returned as an alternate captain for the Jets alongside Byfuglien and Josh Morrissey. He began the season strong as the Jets maintained a 10–7–1 record through October and early November. On November 10, Scheifele recorded his ninth career overtime goal, tying Ilya Kovalchuk for the most in Jets/Atlanta Thrashers history. Nearly a month later, he scored twice in a 3–2 win over the Anaheim Ducks to secure his 399th and 400th NHL points. At the end of December, Scheifele and teammate Connor Hellebuyck were selected for the 2020 National Hockey League All-Star Game. At the time of his selection, he led the team in points, goals, and assists, and ranked in the league's top-20 in goals. Shortly following his selection, Scheifele was recognized as the NHL's Second Star of the Week ending on January 6 after recording three multi-point games to tie for the League lead in scoring. Upon returning from the All-Star Break, Scheifele went 12 games without scoring a goal before recording his third career NHL hat-trick on February 20 against the Ottawa Senators. When the league officially paused the season in March due to the COVID-19 pandemic, Scheifele had accumulated 29 goals and 44 assists for 73 points through 71 games. He led the team in assists, power play goals, and average ice time on ice but tied with Connor for most points. During the COVID pause, Scheifele donated $100,000 to Winnipeg Harvest Inc. to assist members in the community. He also joined the league's Return to Play (RTP) committee in an effort to finish the 2019–20 season. During the Western Conference seeding round-robin against the Calgary Flames, Scheifele suffered an Achilles tendon injury after colliding with Flames forward Matthew Tkachuk. He subsequently sat out the remainder of the playoffs, where the Jets were eliminated early, but said it did not interfere with his off-season training. When speaking about the incident, Scheifele said he holds no ill will against Tkachuk and did not believe he intended to injure him.

After recovering from the injury during the offseason, Scheifele returned to the Jets' line-up to compete in the North Division during the 2020–21 season. During training camp, Scheifele was paired with Ehlers and Wheeler which diverted from his previous left-wing partner Kyle Connor. However, as the season progressed, Scheifele and Wheeler gained Pierre-Luc Dubois as their linemate on the Jets top line. With these linemates, Scheifele maintained a career-high 11-game point streak through February for a total of 28 points. On May 6, 2021, Scheifele recorded his 500th career NHL point with an assist on Wheeler's third period goal against the Calgary Flames. His assist also helped the Jets snap their seven-game losing streak and qualify for the 2021 Stanley Cup playoffs. Scheifele finished the 2020–21 regular season with 21 goals and 42 assists for 63 points through 56 games as the Jets met with the Edmonton Oilers in the First Round of the Stanley Cup playoffs. Scheifele and Wheeler tallied five points each during the first round series to lead the team as they swept the Oilers in four games. During Game 1 of the following round, Scheifele was suspended four games for charging Montreal Canadiens forward Jake Evans. As the Jets were swept in four games, Scheifele was unable to return to the lineup and finished the postseason with five points.

As a result of the suspension, Scheifele sat out for the Jets' 2021–22 season opener against the Anaheim Ducks. He then played two games, and added two assists, before testing positive for COVID-19 and quarantining. After missing five games, he returned on November 2 for a shootout win over the Dallas Stars. Although he would shortly thereafter suffer a lower-body injury, Scheifele only missed one practice before returning to the Jets lineup. While Scheifele struggled to produce, his team began with a winning 8–3–3 record. He started the season with a 14 game scoring drought, which he broke by scoring the overtime game-winning goal on November 14 against the Los Angeles Kings. This goal also broke Kovalchuk's franchise record and secured Scheifele in first place. Scheifele's struggles continued throughout the season as he experienced another lengthy goalless drought in December. The seven-game streak was snapped on December 3 after he recorded his fourth career NHL hat-trick against the New Jersey Devils. As both Scheifele and the Jets struggled to win games, head coach Paul Maurice was replaced with Dave Lowry on December 17. After continuing to struggle through January, Scheifele began receiving criticism for being too casual in his game play and underachieving. He experienced another six game goalless streak in February that was snapped by his fifth career NHL hat-trick against the Minnesota Wild. The Jets were eliminated from playoff contention on April 20, 2022, after the Vegas Golden Knights defeated the Washington Capitals 4–3 in overtime. This marked the first time in five years that the Jets failed to qualify for the Stanley Cup playoffs. Due to an upper body injury, Scheifele missed the Jets final nine games and finished the season with 29 goals and 41 assists for 70 points through 67 games. During his exit interview, Scheifele commented: "I just have to know where this team is going and what the direction is and what the changes are going to be, if any." This began rumours that he had requested a trade, which Jets general manager Kevin Cheveldayoff denied.

Scheifele and the Jets began the 2022–23 season strong and quickly tied a franchise record for the best start to a season. This was in spite of missing numerous key players due to injuries such as Ehlers, Wheeler, and Mason Appleton. By late November, Scheifele was leading the team with 11 goals as the team improved to a 13–6–1 record. While the team suffered setbacks due to injuries, Scheifele and Dubois continued to lead the top two lines and collect points. In December, Scheifele recorded two hat-tricks as the Jets finished the year with a 22–13–1 record. His sixth hat-trick came in a 6–5 loss to the Vegas Golden Knights on December 13 while his seventh came at the end of the month in a win over the Vancouver Canucks. In the second to last game of the season, Scheifele scored to help lead the Jets over the Minnesota Wild and clinch a playoff berth in the 2023 Stanley Cup playoffs. However, he would be limited to only four games during their first round series against the Golden Knights due to an injury.

Prior to the start of the 2023–24 season, Scheifele and Hellebuyck signed an identical seven-year, $59.5 million contract extension with the Jets.

On October 18, 2025, Scheifele scored a power play goal against the Nashville Predators for his 813th career NHL point, which at the time made him the all-time points leader for the Winnipeg Jets franchise. In that same year, he openly stated that he was chasing the all-time record for goals scored as a Winnipeg Jet as a whole, which was being held by Dale Hawerchuk (who had coached Scheifele when with the Colts), who had scored 379 goals for the original Jets. He broke his previous career high in assists, 50, after assisting on a goal by Kyle Connor during a March 14 game against the Colorado Avalanche. He scored the 900th point of his career during an April 6 game against the Seattle Kraken, and he broke Marian Hossa's franchise records for points on April 13 when he scored a goal during the third period of a game against the Vegas Golden Knights. He would finish the season with 103 points, becoming the first player in modern Jets' history to score 100 points in a season since the team's relocation from Atlanta.

On September 24, 2026, the NHL announced that at the beginning of the 2026-27 NHL season, the Winnipeg Jets' statistical history would now include stats from the original Winnipeg Jets and the Atlanta Thrashers, which meant that Scheifele ranked second to Hawerchuk for goals (379) and points (929) along with fourth in assists to Thomas Steen (553) on the all-time list. On November 12, he closed out a three-point night (two goals, one assist) with an assist to tie Hawerchuk with 929 career points. Two days later, he had a four-point performance of a goal and three assists to surpass both Hawerchuk in points and Thomas Steen in assists.

== International play ==
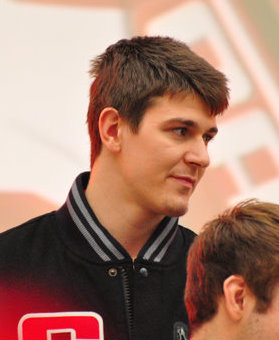
- Scheifele as a member of Team Canada at the 2012 World Junior Championships

Medal record

Representing Canada

Ice hockey

World Championships
Gold medal – first place	2016 Russia	
Silver medal – second place	2017 Germany/France	

World Junior Championships
Bronze medal – third place	2012 Canada	

Scheifele has competed for Team Canada at both the junior and national level at international tournaments. His first international tournament was at the 2012 World Junior Ice Hockey Championships held in Calgary and Edmonton. Scheifele played on a line with Tanner Pearson and each set each other up for goals to win the bronze medal. Later that year, he also competed in the 2012 Canada–Russia Challenge where he helped Team Canada win a gold medal. Scheifele also participated in the 2013 World Junior Ice Hockey Championships, held in Ufa, Russia.

During his rookie season with the Jets, Scheifele played for the senior Canadian team at the 2014 IIHF World Championship in Minsk. However, they failed to medal at the tournament after being eliminated by Finland in the quarter-finals. He was later named to Team Canada's 2016 IIHF World Championship roster, held in Moscow and Saint Petersburg, where he won the gold medal. Following this, Scheifele was named Kitchener-Waterloo and area's top athlete for 2016. Later that year, Scheifele represented Team North America at the 2016 World Cup of Hockey, playing on the top line alongside Auston Matthews and Connor McDavid. In 2019, Scheifele announced his decision to skip the 2019 IIHF World Championship after the Jets were eliminated from the Stanley Cup playoffs.

== Playing style ==
Prior to being drafted into the NHL, Scheifele described himself as a "hard working, 2-way, play-making center." Since then, however, Scheifele has been denounced for his lack of defensive acumen and has come to be perceived as a one-way offensive player. Once making the NHL full-time, he earned numerous praises from teammates and opponents, including former Toronto Maple Leafs head coach Mike Babcock who called him "one of the best centres in the league."

== Personal life ==
Scheifele is a practising Christian and has gathered with teammates Adam Lowry, Josh Morrissey, and formerly Tucker Poolman to pray and talk. When speaking of the impact his faith has over his life, Scheifele said: "I take the role I play in the community here as a Christian very seriously." Scheifele is also a Sport Ambassador for KidSport Winnipeg, a charity that aims to remove the financial barriers to playing sports, and runs an annual hockey camp for boys and girls on behalf of KidSport Winnipeg.

Scheifele grew up playing golf on a small course in Tavistock, Ontario, and considers himself a casual golfer. In 2018, he replaced Blake Wheeler at the PGA Tour Canada event where he posted a birdie, six pars, seven bogeys, three double bogeys and one triple for an 87. He later played in another golf tournament in support of KidSport Winnipeg.

In 2020, Scheifele was sued by his former personal chef who claimed he "didn't pay him in a "timely and consistent manner;" didn't give the chef health benefits; and "[caused] the Plaintiff to incur substantial out of pocket expenses in carrying out his duties as an employee." Scheifele responded to the lawsuit denying all claims and asked for the suit to be dismissed.

The night before game 6 of a 2025 second-round matchup against the Dallas Stars, Scheifele's father died unexpectedly. Following the news, donations of $55 (Scheifele's jersey number) began to be made in his father's memory to charities supported by Scheifele, including KidSport Canada and the True North Youth Foundation.

Scheifele is the owner of two pet goats named Tiger Woods and Tom Brady.

== Career statistics ==
=== Regular season and playoffs ===
			Regular season					Playoffs
Season	Team	League	GP	G	A	Pts	PIM	GP	G	A	Pts	PIM
2008–09	Kitchener Jr. Rangers	ALLIANCE	31	20	19	39	16	9	5	8	13	2
2009–10	Kitchener Dutchmen	GOJHL	51	18	37	55	20	5	0	3	3	6
2010–11	Barrie Colts	OHL	66	22	53	75	35	—	—	—	—	—
2011–12	Winnipeg Jets	NHL	7	1	0	1	0	—	—	—	—	—
2011–12	Barrie Colts	OHL	47	23	40	63	36	13	5	7	12	12
2011–12	St. John's IceCaps	AHL	—	—	—	—	—	10	0	1	1	2
2012–13	Barrie Colts	OHL	45	39	40	79	30	21	15	26	41	14
2012–13	Winnipeg Jets	NHL	4	0	0	0	0	—	—	—	—	—
2013–14	Winnipeg Jets	NHL	63	13	21	34	14	—	—	—	—	—
2014–15	Winnipeg Jets	NHL	82	15	34	49	24	4	0	1	1	4
2015–16	Winnipeg Jets	NHL	71	29	32	61	48	—	—	—	—	—
2016–17	Winnipeg Jets	NHL	79	32	50	82	38	—	—	—	—	—
2017–18	Winnipeg Jets	NHL	60	23	37	60	18	17	14	6	20	10
2018–19	Winnipeg Jets	NHL	82	38	46	84	38	6	2	3	5	8
2019–20	Winnipeg Jets	NHL	71	29	44	73	45	1	0	0	0	0
2020–21	Winnipeg Jets	NHL	56	21	42	63	12	5	2	3	5	17
2021–22	Winnipeg Jets	NHL	67	29	41	70	23	—	—	—	—	—
2022–23	Winnipeg Jets	NHL	81	42	26	68	43	4	1	0	1	4
2023–24	Winnipeg Jets	NHL	74	25	47	72	57	5	2	4	6	0
2024–25	Winnipeg Jets	NHL	82	39	48	87	61	11	5	6	11	16
2025–26	Winnipeg Jets	NHL	82	36	67	103	43	—	—	—	—	—
NHL totals			961	372	535	907	464	53	26	23	49	59

=== International ===
Year	Team	Event	Result	GP	G	A	Pts	PIM
2011	Canada	U18	4th	7	6	2	8	2
2012	Canada	WJC	3rd place, bronze medalist(s)	6	3	3	6	0
2013	Canada	WJC	4th	6	5	3	8	2
2014	Canada	WC	5th	8	2	2	4	0
2016	Canada	WC	1st place, gold medalist(s)	9	4	5	9	0
2016	Team North America	WCH	5th	3	0	1	1	2
2017	Canada	WC	2nd place, silver medalist(s)	10	3	5	8	8
2026	Canada	WC	4th	10	3	4	7	0
Junior totals				19	14	8	22	4
Senior totals				40	12	17	29	10

== Awards and honours ==
Award	Year	Ref
NHL
NHL All-Star Game	2019, 2020	

Awards and achievements
Preceded by Alexander Burmistrov	Winnipeg Jets first-round draft pick 2011	Succeeded by Jacob Trouba
