= List of Winnipeg Jets draft picks =

This is a complete list of ice hockey players who have been drafted in the National Hockey League entry draft by the Winnipeg Jets. It includes every player who was drafted, regardless of whether they played for the team.

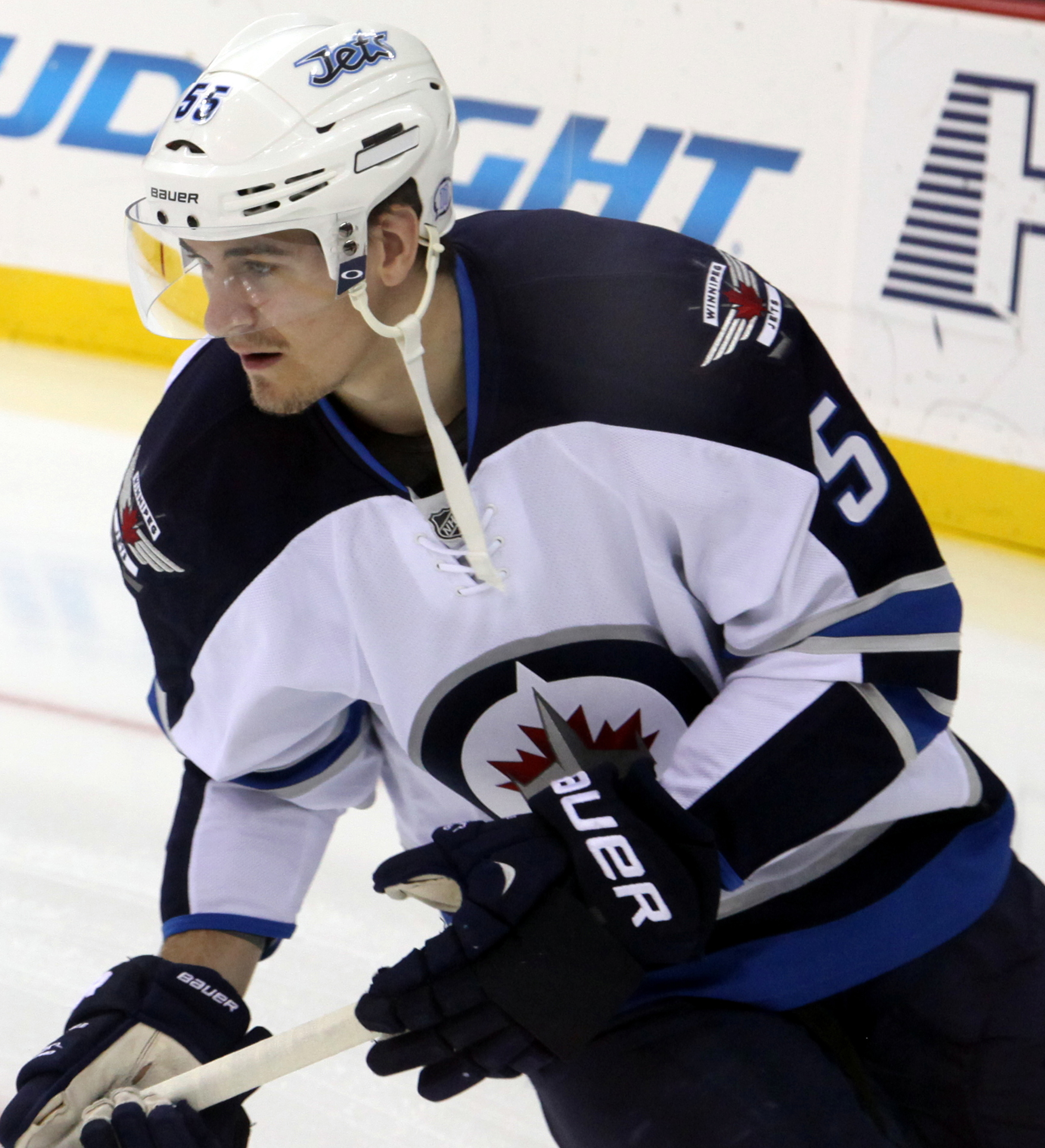
Mark Scheifele was the Jets first ever draft pick taken 7th overall in 2011.

== Key ==
Played at least one game with the Jets.
Spent entire NHL career with the Jets.

General
Pos	Position

Positions
G	Goaltender	C	Centre
D	Defenceman	LW	Left wing
RW	Right wing	F	Forward

Statistics
GP	Games played	G	Goals
A	Assists	Pts	Points
PIM	Penalties in minutes	GAA	Goals against average
W	Wins	L	Losses
T	Ties	OT	Overtime/Shootout losses
GAA	Goals against average		

== Draft picks ==
Statistics are complete as of the 2025–26 NHL season and show each player's career regular season totals in the NHL. Wins, losses, overtime losses, goals against average and save percentage apply to goaltenders and are used only for players at that position.

Year	Round	Pick	Player	Nationality	Amateur Team	Pos	GP	G	A	Pts	PIM	W	L	OT	GAA	SVS%
2011	1	7	Mark Scheifele	Canada	Barrie Colts (OHL)	C	961	372	535	907	464					
2011	3	67	Adam Lowry	Canada	Swift Current Broncos (WHL)	LW	845	126	168	294	452					
2011	3	78	Brennan Serville	Canada	Stouffville Spirit (OJHL)	D										
2011	4	119	Zach Yuen	Canada	Tri-City Americans (WHL)	D										
2011	5	149	Austen Brassard	Canada	Belleville Bulls (OHL)	RW										
2011	6	157	Jason Kasdorf	Canada	Portage Terriers (MJHL)	G	1	0	0	0	0	0	1	0	4.00	.867
2011	7	187	Aaron Harstad	United States	Green Bay Gamblers (USHL)	D										
2012	1	9	Jacob Trouba	United States	U.S. NTDP (USHL)	D	906	84	274	358	701					
2012	2	39	Lukas Sutter	Canada	Saskatoon Blades (WHL)	C										
2012	3	70	Scott Kosmachuk	Canada	Guelph Storm (OHL)	RW	8	0	3	3	2					
2012	5	130	Connor Hellebuyck	United States	Odessa Jackalopes (NAHL)	G	625	0	10	10	12	345	208	55	2.58	.916
2012	6	160	Ryan Olsen	Canada	Saskatoon Blades (WHL)	C										
2012	7	190	Jamie Phillips	Canada	Toronto Jr. Canadiens (OJHL)	G										
2013	1	13	Josh Morrissey	Canada	Prince Albert Raiders (WHL)	D	739	94	334	428	351					
2013	2	43	Nic Petan	Canada	Portland Winterhawks (WHL)	C	170	7	28	35	46					
2013	2	59	Eric Comrie	Canada	Tri-City Americans (WHL)	G	102	0	2	2	2	45	47	4	3.11	.896
2013	3	84	Jimmy Lodge	United States	Saginaw Spirit (OHL)	C										
2013	3	91	JC Lipon	Canada	Kamloops Blazers (WHL)	RW	9	0	1	1	5					
2013	4	104	Andrew Copp	United States	Michigan Wolverines (CCHA)	C	779	123	220	343	173					
2013	4	114	Jan Kostalek	Czech Republic	Rimouski Océanic (QMJHL)	D										
2013	5	127	Tucker Poolman	United States	Wichita Falls Wildcats (NAHL)	D	163	6	17	23	38					
2013	7	190	Brenden Kichton	Canada	Spokane Chiefs (WHL)	D										
2013	7	194	Marcus Karlstrom	Sweden	AIK (J20 SuperElit)	D										
2014	1	9	Nikolaj Ehlers	Denmark	Halifax Mooseheads (QMJHL)	LW	756	251	340	591	236					
2014	3	69	Jack Glover	United States	U.S. NTDP (USHL)	D										
2014	4	99	Chase De Leo	United States	Portland Winterhawks (WHL)	C	7	0	0	0	0					
2014	4	101	Nelson Nogier	Canada	Saskatoon Blades (WHL)	D	11	0	0	0	5					
2014	5	129	C. J. Suess	United States	Sioux Falls Stampede (USHL)	F	5	0	0	0	4					
2014	6	164	Pavel Kraskovsky	Russia	Lokomotiv Yaroslavl (KHL)	C										
2014	7	192	Matt Ustaski	United States	Langley Rivermen (BCHL)	F										
2015	1	17	Kyle Connor	United States	Youngstown Phantoms (USHL)	LW	695	323	351	674	155					
2015	1	25	Jack Roslovic	United States	U.S. NTDP (USHL)	C	595	123	173	296	96					
2015	2	47	Jansen Harkins	Canada	Prince George Cougars (WHL)	C	305	18	27	45	106					
2015	3	78	Erik Foley	United States	Cedar Rapids Roughriders (USHL)	LW										
2015	4	108	Michael Spacek	Czech Republic	HC Pardubice (Czech)	RW										
2015	6	168	Mason Appleton	United States	Tri-City Storm (USHL)	C	465	63	89	152	168					
2015	7	198	Sami Niku	Finland	JYP Jyväskylä (Liiga)	D	67	2	14	16	24					
2015	7	203	Matteo Gennaro	Canada	Prince Albert Raiders (WHL)	C										
2016	1	2	Patrik Laine	Finland	Tappara Tampere (Liiga)	RW	537	224	198	422	201					
2016	1	18	Logan Stanley	Canada	Windsor Spitfires (OHL)	D	278	14	48	62	333					
2016	3	79	Luke Green	Canada	Saint John Sea Dogs (QMJHL)	D										
2016	4	97	Jacob Cederholm	Sweden	HV71 (SHL)	D										
2016	5	127	Jordan Stallard	Canada	Calgary Hitmen (WHL)	C										
2016	6	157	Mikhail Berdin	Russia	Team Russia U18 (Russia)	G										
2017	1	24	Kristian Vesalainen	Finland	Frölunda HC (SHL)	RW	70	2	3	5	6					
2017	2	43	Dylan Samberg	United States	Hermantown High (USHS)	D	282	10	55	65	112					
2017	3	74	Johnathan Kovacevic	Canada	Merrimack College (HE)	D	258	10	43	53	193					
2017	4	105	Santeri Virtanen	Finland	TPS U20 (Liiga)	F										
2017	5	136	Leon Gawanke	Germany	Cape Breton Screaming Eagles (QMJHL)	D										
2017	6	167	Arvid Holm	Sweden	Karlskrona HK U20 (Sweden)	G										
2017	7	198	Skyler McKenzie	Canada	Portland Winterhawks (WHL)	LW										
2017	7	211	Croix Evingson	United States	Shreveport Mudbugs (NAHL)	D										
2018	2	60	David Gustafsson	Sweden	HV71 (Sweden)	C	149	6	14	20	13					
2018	3	91	Nathan Smith	United States	Cedar Rapids (NAHL)	C	14	2	2	4	6					
2018	5	150	Declan Chisholm	Canada	Peterborough Petes (OHL)	D	125	6	22	28	32					
2018	5	153	Giovanni Vallati	Canada	Kitchener Rangers (OHL)	D										
2018	6	184	Jared Moe	United States	Waterloo Black Hawks (USHL)	G										
2018	7	215	Austin Wong	Canada	Okotoks Oilers (AJHL)	C										
2019	1	20	Ville Heinola	Finland	Lukko (Liiga)	D	58	1	11	12	26					
2019	2	51	Simon Lundmark	Sweden	Linköpings HC (SHL)	D	1	0	0	0	0					
2019	4	113	Henri Nikkanen	Finland	Jukurit (Liiga)	C										
2019	5	134	Harrison Blaisdell	Canada	Chilliwack Chiefs (BCHL)	C										
2019	5	144	Logan Neaton	United States	Prince George Spruce Kings (BCHL)	G										
2020	1	10	Cole Perfetti	Canada	Saginaw Spirit (OHL)	C	290	59	98	157	68					
2020	2	40	Daniel Torgersson	Sweden	Frölunda (SHL)	LW										
2020	5	133	Anton Johannesson	Sweden	HV71 (SHL)	D										
2020	6	164	Tyrel Bauer	Canada	Seattle Thunderbirds (WHL)	D										
2021	1	18	Chaz Lucius	United States	USNTDP (USHL)	C										
2021	2	50	Nikita Chibrikov	Russia	SKA Saint Petersburg (KHL)	LW	16	3	1	4	14					
2021	3	82	Dmitri Kuzmin	Belarus	HC Dinamo-Molodechno (BHL)	D										
2021	5	146	Dmitri Rashevsky	Russia	HC Dinamo Saint Petersburg (VHL)	RW										
2022	1	14	Rutger McGroarty	United States	USNTDP (USHL)	C	32	4	5	9	4					
2022	1	30	Brad Lambert	Finland	Lahti Pelicans (Liiga)	C	31	3	5	8	8					
2022	2	55	Elias Salomonsson	Sweden	Skellefteå AIK (SHL)	D	32	1	4	5	12					
2022	3	77	Danny Zhilkin	Canada	Guelph Storm (OHL)	C	6	0	1	1	0					
2022	4	99	Garrett Brown	United States	Sioux City Musketeers (USHL)	D										
2022	6	175	Fabian Wagner	Sweden	Linköping HC (J20 Nationell)	C										
2022	7	207	Dominic DiVincentiis	Canada	North Bay Battalion (OHL)	G										
2023	1	18	Colby Barlow	Canada	Owen Sound Attack (OHL)	LW										
2023	3	82	Zach Nehring	United States	Shattuck-St. Mary's (USHS)	RW										
2023	5	146	Jacob Julien	Canada	London Knights (OHL)	C										
2023	5	151	Thomas Milic	Canada	Seattle Thunderbirds (WHL)	G	3	0	0	0	2	0	1	0	3.45	.871
2023	7	210	Connor Levis	Canada	Kamloops Blazers (WHL)	RW										
2024	2	37	Alfons Freij	Sweden	IF Björklöven (HockeyAllsvenskan)	D										
2024	4	109	Kevin He	China	Niagara IceDogs (OHL)	LW										
2024	5	155	Markus Loponen	Finland	Oulun Kärpät (Liiga)	C										
2024	6	187	Kieron Walton	Canada	Sudbury Wolves (OHL)	C										
2025	1	28	Sascha Boumedienne	Sweden	Boston Terriers (Hockey East)	D										
2025	3	92	Owen Martin	Canada	Spokane Chiefs (WHL)	C										
2025	5	156	Viktor Klingsell	Sweden	Skellefteå AIK (SHL)	LW										
2025	6	188	Edison Engle	United States	Brantford Bulldogs (OHL)	D										
2025	7	220	Jacob Cloutier	Canada	Saginaw Spirit (OHL)	RW										
2026	1	8	Viggo Björck	Sweden	Djurgårdens IF (SHL)	C										
2026	3	71	Samuel Hrenak	Slovakia	Fargo Force (USHL)	G										
2026	4	116	Zach Wooten	United States	Green Bay Gamblers (USHL)	C										
2026	5	135	Alexandre Taillefer	Canada	Quebec Remparts (QMJHL)	D										
2026	4	167	Landon Hafele	United States	Green Bay Gamblers (USHL)	C										
2026	7	199	Noa Ta'amu	United States	Edmonton Oil Kings (WHL)	C										
2026	7	220	John Parsons	United States	Providence Friars (Hockey East)	G										

== See also ==
- List of Atlanta Thrashers draft picks
