= Rutger McGroarty =

American ice hockey player (born 2004)

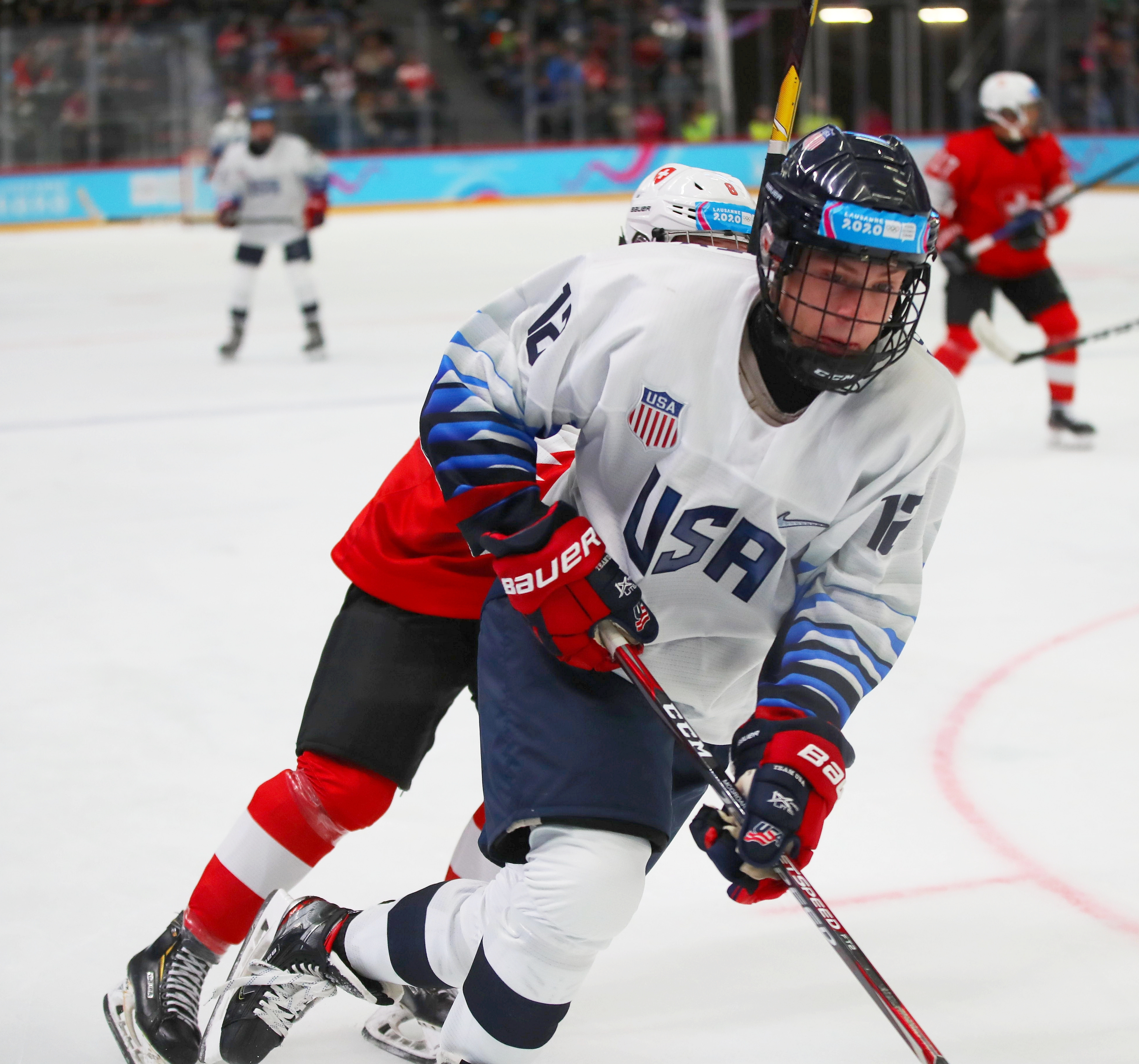
- McGroarty at the 2020 Winter Youth Olympics
- Born: March 30, 2004 (age 22) Lincoln, Nebraska, U.S.
- Height: 6 ft 1 in (185 cm)
- Weight: 212 lb (96 kg; 15 st 2 lb)
- Position: Forward
- Shoots: Left
- NHL team: Pittsburgh Penguins
- NHL draft: 14th overall, 2022; Winnipeg Jets
- Playing career: 2024–present

Rutger McGroarty (born March 30, 2004) is an American professional ice hockey player who is a forward for the Pittsburgh Penguins of the National Hockey League (NHL). He was selected in the first round, 14th overall, by the Winnipeg Jets in the 2022 NHL entry draft, but was traded to the Penguins before he began his professional career.

== Playing career ==
=== Early years ===
McGroarty spent two seasons with the USA Hockey National Team Development Program (USNTDP). He was the first player from the state of Nebraska to play for the USNTDP. During the 2020–21 season, he recorded 20 goals and 21 assists in 53 games. The following season, McGroarty recorded 35 goals and 34 assists in 54 games, leading the team in goals, and fourth in points with 69. He competed at the 2022 BioSteel All-American Game where he recorded an assist and a goal with 2:37 left in regulation to force overtime. He was subsequently named the game's MVP.

In July 2022, McGroarty was selected in the first round, 14th overall, by the Winnipeg Jets in the 2022 NHL entry draft, surpassing Jake Guentzel (77th overall, 2013) to become the highest drafted player from the state of Nebraska.

=== Collegiate ===
McGroarty committed to play college ice hockey for the Michigan Wolverines of the National Collegiate Athletic Association (NCAA) beginning in the 2022–23 season. During his freshman season, he recorded 18 goals and 21 assists in 39 games.

McGroarty was named the Hockey Commissioners Association co-Player of the Month for the opening month of the 2023–24 season. He led the nation in scoring during October, finishing with 15 points in eight games (five goals and 10 assists). He had at least one point in seven games, including the first five of the season, to extend his point-scoring streak to a career-high 13 games. In the eight games he played, he had multiple points in five. He also scored two game-winning goals and two power-play goals and led the team in shots with 33. McGroarty was named the Hockey Commissioners Association Player of the Month for the month of January 2024, averaging 2.67 points per game. He recorded three goals and 13 assists, scoring in all six games, and had multiple points in five of the games. He would finish his sophomore season with 16 goals and 36 assists in 36 games played. His 52 points ranked second on the team in scoring, whereas his 1.59 points per game ranked fourth in the nation. Following the season, McGroarty was named to the All-Big Ten First team, and named an AHCA West Second Team All-American.

Collectively, he finished his collegiate career with 34 goals, 57 assists and 91 points in 75 games for the Wolverines.

=== Professional ===
Prior to the 2024–25 season, reports emerged that McGroarty refused to sign with Winnipeg, with the team beginning to explore trade options. On August 22, 2024, McGroarty was traded to the Pittsburgh Penguins in exchange for Brayden Yager. Following the trade, he immediately signed a three-year, entry-level contract with the Penguins. He made the Penguins' opening night roster, and made his NHL debut on October 9, 2024, where he had one shot on goal in 12:20 time on ice. On October 16, 2024, he was assigned to the Penguins' AHL affiliate, the Wilkes-Barre/Scranton Penguins. Prior to being reassigned, he was scoreless in three games for the Penguins. On March 29, 2025, McGroarty was recalled by the Penguins. Prior to being recalled he recorded 14 goals and 25 assists in 60 games. On April 3, 2025, in a game against the St. Louis Blues, he scored his first career NHL goal with 23.5 seconds left in regulation to tie the game and force overtime. Although the Penguins lost the game 5–4, McGroarty also had an assist earlier in the contest, with his first two NHL points also marking his first multi-point NHL game.

== International play ==
Medal record

Representing United States

Ice hockey

World Junior Championships
Gold medal – first place	2024 Sweden	
Bronze medal – third place	2023 Canada	

World U18 Championships
Silver medal – second place	2022 Germany	

McGroarty represented the United States at the 2020 Winter Youth Olympics and won a silver medal.

McGroarty represented the United States at the 2021 IIHF World U18 Championships, where he was scoreless in five games. He again represented the United States at the 2022 IIHF World U18 Championships, where he served as team captain and recorded eight goals and one assist in six games and won a silver medal.

On December 12, 2022, McGroarty was named to the United States men's national junior ice hockey team to compete at the 2023 World Junior Ice Hockey Championships. During the tournament he recorded one goal and six assists in seven games and won a bronze medal.

On December 16, 2023, McGroarty was again named to Team USA's roster to compete at the 2024 World Junior Ice Hockey Championships where he served as team captain. During the tournament he recorded five goals and four assists in seven games and won a gold medal. He was the first forward to captain a U.S. National Junior Team since Joey Anderson in 2018.

== Personal life ==
McGroarty was raised in Lincoln, Nebraska. His father, Jim, is a Canadian former professional ice hockey defenceman from Mississauga, Ontario, while his mother, Cindy, is a native Nebraskan. The family moved to Michigan before McGroarty joined the United States National Team Development Program (USNTDP).

== Career statistics ==
=== Regular season and playoffs ===
			Regular season					Playoffs
Season	Team	League	GP	G	A	Pts	PIM	GP	G	A	Pts	PIM
2020–21	U.S. National Development Team	USHL	53	20	21	41	34	—	—	—	—	—
2021–22	U.S. National Development Team	USHL	54	35	34	69	65	—	—	—	—	—
2022–23	University of Michigan	B1G	39	18	21	39	18	—	—	—	—	—
2023–24	University of Michigan	B1G	36	16	36	52	6	—	—	—	—	—
2024–25	Pittsburgh Penguins	NHL	8	1	2	3	0	—	—	—	—	—
2024–25	Wilkes-Barre/Scranton Penguins	AHL	60	14	25	39	37	—	—	—	—	—
2025–26	Pittsburgh Penguins	NHL	24	3	3	6	4	—	—	—	—	—
2025–26	Wilkes-Barre/Scranton Penguins	AHL	30	10	24	34	9	15	4	5	9	6
NHL totals			32	4	5	9	4	—	—	—	—	—

=== International ===
Year	Team	Event	Result	GP	G	A	Pts	PIM
2021	United States	U18	5th	5	0	0	0	2
2022	United States	U18	2nd place, silver medalist(s)	6	8	1	9	27
2023	United States	WJC	3rd place, bronze medalist(s)	7	1	6	7	0
2024	United States	WJC	1st place, gold medalist(s)	7	5	4	9	10
Junior totals				25	14	11	25	39

== Awards and honors ==
Award	Year	Ref
College
Big Ten All-Tournament Team	2023, 2024	
All-Big Ten First Team	2024	
AHCA West Second Team All-American	2024	

Awards and achievements
Preceded by Chaz Lucius	Winnipeg Jets first-round draft pick 2022	Succeeded by Brad Lambert
