= Ville Heinola =

Finnish ice hockey player (born 2001)

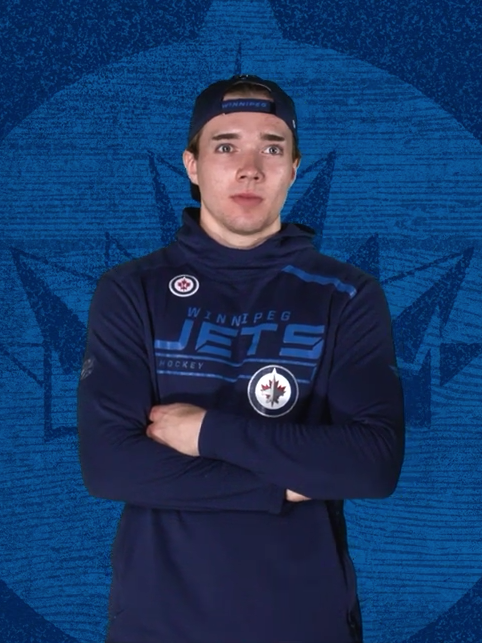
- Heinola in 2022
- Born: 2 March 2001 (age 25) Honkajoki, Finland
- Height: 6 ft 0 in (183 cm)
- Weight: 181 lb (82 kg; 12 st 13 lb)
- Position: Defence
- Shoots: Left
- NHL team Former teams: Vegas Golden Knights; Lukko; Winnipeg Jets
- National team: Finland
- NHL draft: 20th overall, 2019; Winnipeg Jets
- Playing career: 2018–present

Ville Heinola (born 2 March 2001) is a Finnish professional ice hockey player who is a defenceman for the Vegas Golden Knights of the National Hockey League (NHL). Ranked as one of the top international skaters eligible for the 2019 NHL entry draft. Heinola was selected 20th overall by the Jets, with whom he made his NHL debut in 2019.

== Playing career ==
On 15 July 2019, Heinola was signed to a three-year, entry-level contract with the Winnipeg Jets.

Heinola impressively made the Jets roster out of training camp. He became the first player of the 2019 NHL entry draft to register an NHL point during the Jets first game of the 2019–20 season against the New York Rangers on 3 October 2019. Heinola scored his first career NHL goal on 8 October against Matt Murray of the Pittsburgh Penguins. Heinola posted 5 points through 8 games before he was reassigned to AHL affiliate, the Manitoba Moose. After appearing in 3 games with the Moose, Heinola was loaned to continue development with his Finnish club Lukko for the remainder of the season on 8 November.

As a free agent, Heinola signed a one-year contract with the Vegas Golden Knights on 1 July 2026. Heinola made his Golden Knights debut on October 27, 2026, recording an assist on Raphaël Lavoie's game-winning goal in a 4–1 victory over the Ottawa Senators.

== International play ==
Heinola competed with Team Finland at the IIHF World Junior Hockey Championship in 2019, 2020, and 2021, winning the gold medal in 2019 and the bronze medal in 2021. He was one of two defensemen named to the Media All-Star Team after the end of the 2021 tournament.

== Career statistics ==
=== Regular season and playoffs ===
| | | | Regular season | | | | | Playoffs |
| Season | Team | League | GP | G | A | Pts | PIM | GP | G | A | Pts | PIM |
|---|---|---|---|---|---|---|---|---|---|---|---|---|
| 2017–18 | Ässät | Jr. A | 33 | 3 | 14 | 17 | 12 | — | — | — | — | — |
| 2018–19 | Lukko | Jr. A | 9 | 1 | 8 | 9 | 2 | — | — | — | — | — |
| 2018–19 | Lukko | Liiga | 34 | 2 | 12 | 14 | 26 | 7 | 1 | 3 | 4 | 2 |
| 2019–20 | Winnipeg Jets | NHL | 8 | 1 | 4 | 5 | 4 | — | — | — | — | — |
| 2019–20 | Manitoba Moose | AHL | 3 | 0 | 1 | 1 | 0 | — | — | — | — | — |
| 2019–20 | Lukko | Liiga | 29 | 0 | 7 | 7 | 12 | — | — | — | — | — |
| 2020–21 | Lukko | Liiga | 19 | 1 | 13 | 14 | 4 | — | — | — | — | — |
| 2020–21 | Winnipeg Jets | NHL | 5 | 0 | 0 | 0 | 2 | — | — | — | — | — |
| 2020–21 | Manitoba Moose | AHL | 19 | 4 | 7 | 11 | 4 | — | — | — | — | — |
| 2021–22 | Manitoba Moose | AHL | 41 | 5 | 21 | 26 | 18 | 5 | 1 | 4 | 5 | 0 |
| 2021–22 | Winnipeg Jets | NHL | 12 | 0 | 5 | 5 | 10 | — | — | — | — | — |
| 2022–23 | Manitoba Moose | AHL | 48 | 4 | 33 | 37 | 46 | 4 | 0 | 1 | 1 | 4 |
| 2022–23 | Winnipeg Jets | NHL | 10 | 0 | 1 | 1 | 2 | — | — | — | — | — |
| 2023–24 | Manitoba Moose | AHL | 41 | 10 | 17 | 27 | 24 | 2 | 0 | 2 | 2 | 4 |
| 2024–25 | Manitoba Moose | AHL | 2 | 0 | 1 | 1 | 2 | — | — | — | — | — |
| 2024–25 | Winnipeg Jets | NHL | 18 | 0 | 1 | 1 | 4 | — | — | — | — | — |
| 2025–26 | Manitoba Moose | AHL | 44 | 3 | 18 | 21 | 24 | — | — | — | — | — |
| 2025–26 | Winnipeg Jets | NHL | 5 | 0 | 0 | 0 | 4 | — | — | — | — | — |
| Liiga totals | | | 82 | 3 | 32 | 35 | 42 | 7 | 1 | 3 | 4 | 2 |
| NHL totals | | | 58 | 1 | 11 | 12 | 26 | — | — | — | — | — |

Medal record

Representing Finland

Ice hockey

World Championships
| Gold medal – first place | 2026 Switzerland | |

World Junior Championships
| Gold medal – first place | 2019 Canada | |
| Bronze medal – third place | 2021 Canada | |

=== International ===
| Year | Team | Event | Result | GP | G | A | Pts | PIM |
|---|---|---|---|---|---|---|---|---|
| 2018 | Finland | HG18 | 7th | 4 | 0 | 2 | 2 | 0 |
| 2019 | Finland | WJC | 1st place, gold medalist(s) | 5 | 1 | 1 | 2 | 2 |
| 2020 | Finland | WJC | 4th | 7 | 0 | 5 | 5 | 8 |
| 2021 | Finland | WJC | 3rd place, bronze medalist(s) | 7 | 0 | 4 | 4 | 4 |
| 2026 | Finland | WC | 1st place, gold medalist(s) | 10 | 3 | 3 | 6 | 0 |
| Junior totals | | | | 23 | 1 | 12 | 13 | 14 |
| Senior totals | | | | 10 | 3 | 3 | 6 | 0 |

Awards and achievements
| Preceded by Kristian Vesalainen | Winnipeg Jets first-round draft pick 2019 | Succeeded by Cole Perfetti |
