= Chaz Lucius =

American ice hockey player (born 2003)

- Born: May 2, 2003 (age 23) Lawrence, Kansas, U.S.
- Height: 6 ft 1 in (185 cm)
- Weight: 185 lb (84 kg; 13 st 3 lb)
- Position: Center
- Shot: Right
- Played for: Manitoba Moose
- NHL draft: 18th overall, 2021; Winnipeg Jets
- Playing career: 2022–2025

Chaz Lucius (born May 2, 2003) is an American former professional ice hockey center. Although Lucius was drafted in the first round by the Winnipeg Jets in the 2021 NHL entry draft, he never played in the NHL.

Lucius played collegiate hockey with the Minnesota Golden Gophers in the NCAA. His professional career was plagued by numerous injuries. After playing parts of three seasons for the Manitoba Moose, the Jets' American Hockey League (AHL) affiliate, he was diagnosed with Ehlers–Danlos syndrome and retired from professional hockey in April 2025.

== Playing career ==
Following his freshman season with Minnesota, Lucius concluded his collegiate career by signing a three-year, entry-level contract with the Winnipeg Jets on April 27, 2022. Lucius began his professional career with the Jets' American Hockey League affiliate, the Manitoba Moose, recording 2 goals and 3 assists in 12 games. After returning from the World juniors, Lucius was assigned to play major junior hockey for the remainder of the 2022-23 season with the Portland Winterhawks of the Western Hockey League (WHL) on January 9; he had originally been selected by the Winterhawks 74th overall in the 4th round of the 2018 WHL draft.

Despite being assigned on January 9, due to the team being on an East Division road trip, Lucius did not make his debut until January 20, against the Victoria Royals. In his debut, Lucius recorded 2 assists in a 7–6 overtime win.

On April 8, 2025, after suffering from multiple joint injuries in the prior three seasons, Lucius announced his retirement from professional hockey via Instagram after being diagnosed with Ehlers–Danlos syndrome.

== International play ==
Medal record

Representing United States

Ice hockey

World Junior Championships
Bronze medal – third place	2023 Canada	

On December 12, 2022, Lucius was named to the United States men's national junior ice hockey team to compete at the 2023 World Junior Ice Hockey Championships. During the tournament he recorded five goals and two assists in seven games and won a bronze medal.

== Personal life ==
Lucius has one younger brother, Cruz, who also plays hockey. Cruz played as a winger for the Arizona State Sun Devils of the NCAA; he was drafted by the Carolina Hurricanes in 2022 and currently is an Anaheim Ducks prospect.

== Career statistics ==
=== Regular season and playoffs ===
			Regular season					Playoffs
Season	Team	League	GP	G	A	Pts	PIM	GP	G	A	Pts	PIM
2019–20	U.S. National Development Team	USHL	32	8	14	22	6	—	—	—	—	—
2020–21	U.S. National Development Team	USHL	12	13	5	18	6	—	—	—	—	—
2021–22	University of Minnesota	B1G	24	9	10	19	23	—	—	—	—	—
2022–23	Portland Winterhawks	WHL	6	5	10	15	0	—	—	—	—	—
2022–23	Manitoba Moose	AHL	12	2	3	5	6	—	—	—	—	—
2023–24	Manitoba Moose	AHL	17	2	11	13	6	—	—	—	—	—
2024–25	Manitoba Moose	AHL	25	3	6	9	6	—	—	—	—	—
AHL totals			54	7	20	27	18	—	—	—	—	—

=== International ===
Year	Team	Event	Result	GP	G	A	Pts	PIM
2019	United States	U17	2nd place, silver medalist(s)	6	7	3	10	0
2023	United States	WJC	3rd place, bronze medalist(s)	7	5	2	7	0
Junior totals				13	12	5	17	0

Awards and achievements
Preceded by Cole Perfetti	Winnipeg Jets first-round draft pick 2021	Succeeded by Rutger McGroarty
