= Jacob Trouba =

American ice hockey player (born 1994)

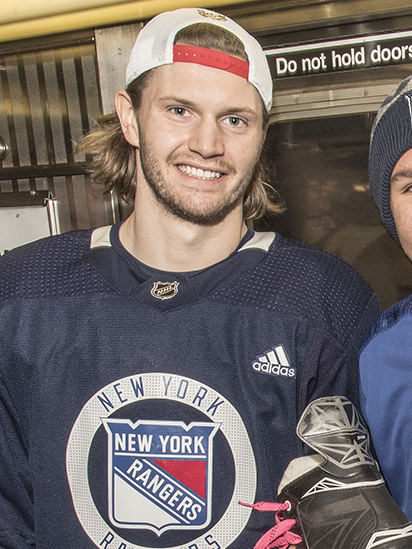
- Trouba with the New York Rangers in 2019
- Born: February 26, 1994 (age 32) Rochester, Michigan, U.S.
- Height: 6 ft 3 in (191 cm)
- Weight: 215 lb (98 kg; 15 st 5 lb)
- Position: Defense
- Shoots: Right
- NHL team Former teams: San Jose Sharks; Winnipeg Jets; New York Rangers; Anaheim Ducks
- National team: United States
- NHL draft: 9th overall, 2012; Winnipeg Jets
- Playing career: 2013–present

Jacob Ryan Trouba (born February 26, 1994) is an American professional ice hockey player who is a defenseman for the San Jose Sharks of the National Hockey League (NHL). Trouba was drafted by the Winnipeg Jets in the first round, ninth overall, of the 2012 NHL entry draft. Trouba played the first six years of his career in Winnipeg before he was traded to the New York Rangers in 2019. Trouba spent five seasons with the Rangers including two and a half seasons as captain before his trade to the Anaheim Ducks in 2024. He signed as a free agent with the San Jose Sharks in 2026.

== Playing career ==
=== Amateur ===
As a youth, Trouba played in the 2007 Quebec International Pee-Wee Hockey Tournament with the Detroit Compuware minor ice hockey team. He later played two seasons with the USA Hockey National Team Development Program in the United States Hockey League (USHL) and at several international tournaments.

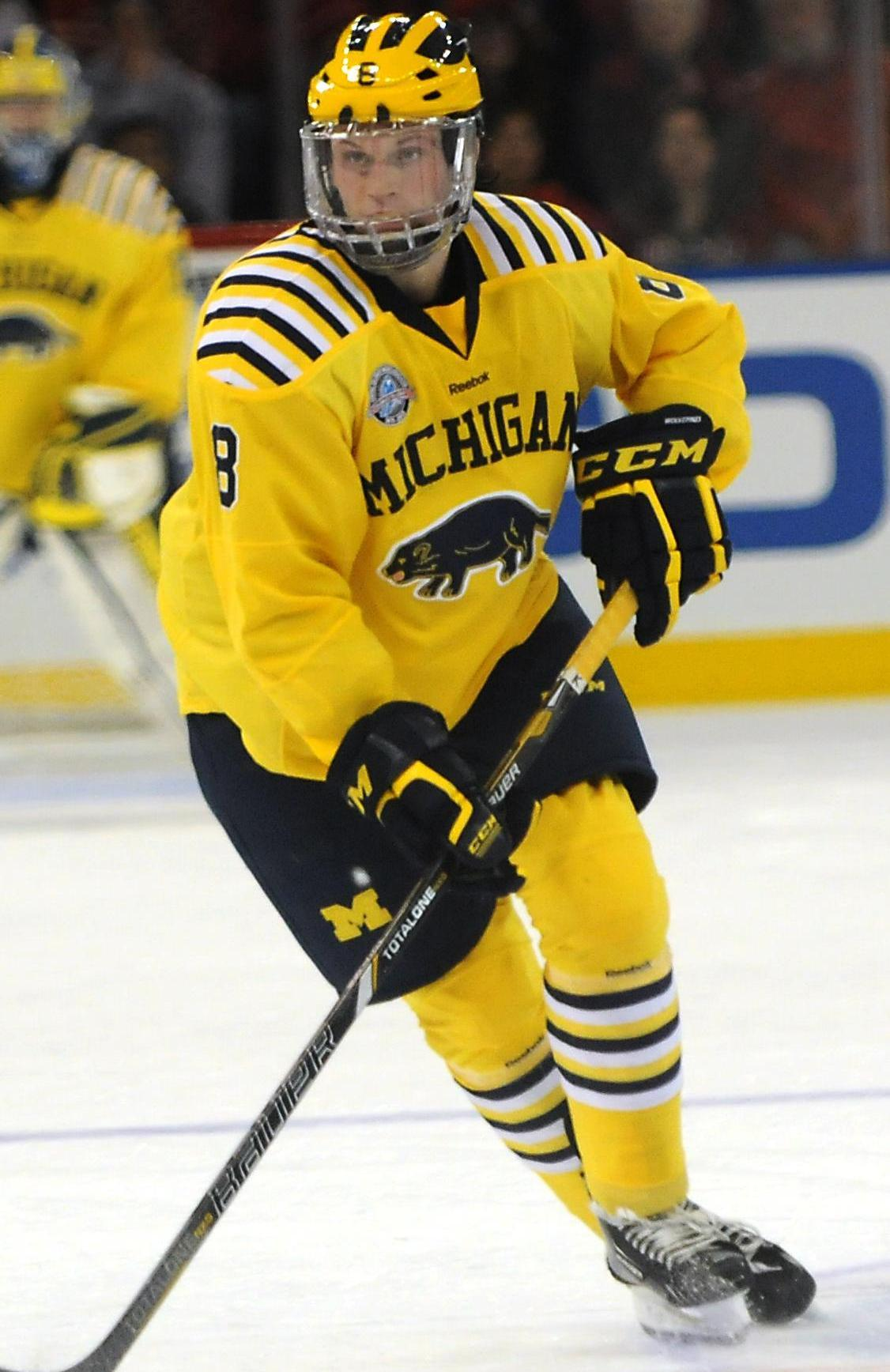
Trouba playing for the Wolverines in November 2012

After finishing his junior hockey career, Trouba joined the University of Michigan for the 2012–13 season, where he played in 37 games for the Wolverines in his first season, scoring 12 goals and 17 assists. At the end of the season, Trouba was named a First Team All-American and was also honored as the Central Collegiate Hockey Association's (CCHA) Best Offensive Defenseman. He was also named first team All-CCHA and an All-CCHA Rookie. Trouba was also named as the team's Most Valuable Player and Best Defenseman. He was the only freshman on the All-American team as well as being the first freshman in the history of the University of Michigan hockey to be named a First Team All-American. At the conclusion of his freshman campaign, Trouba announced he was leaving the team to begin his professional career.

=== Professional (2013–present) ===
==== Winnipeg Jets (2013–2019) ====
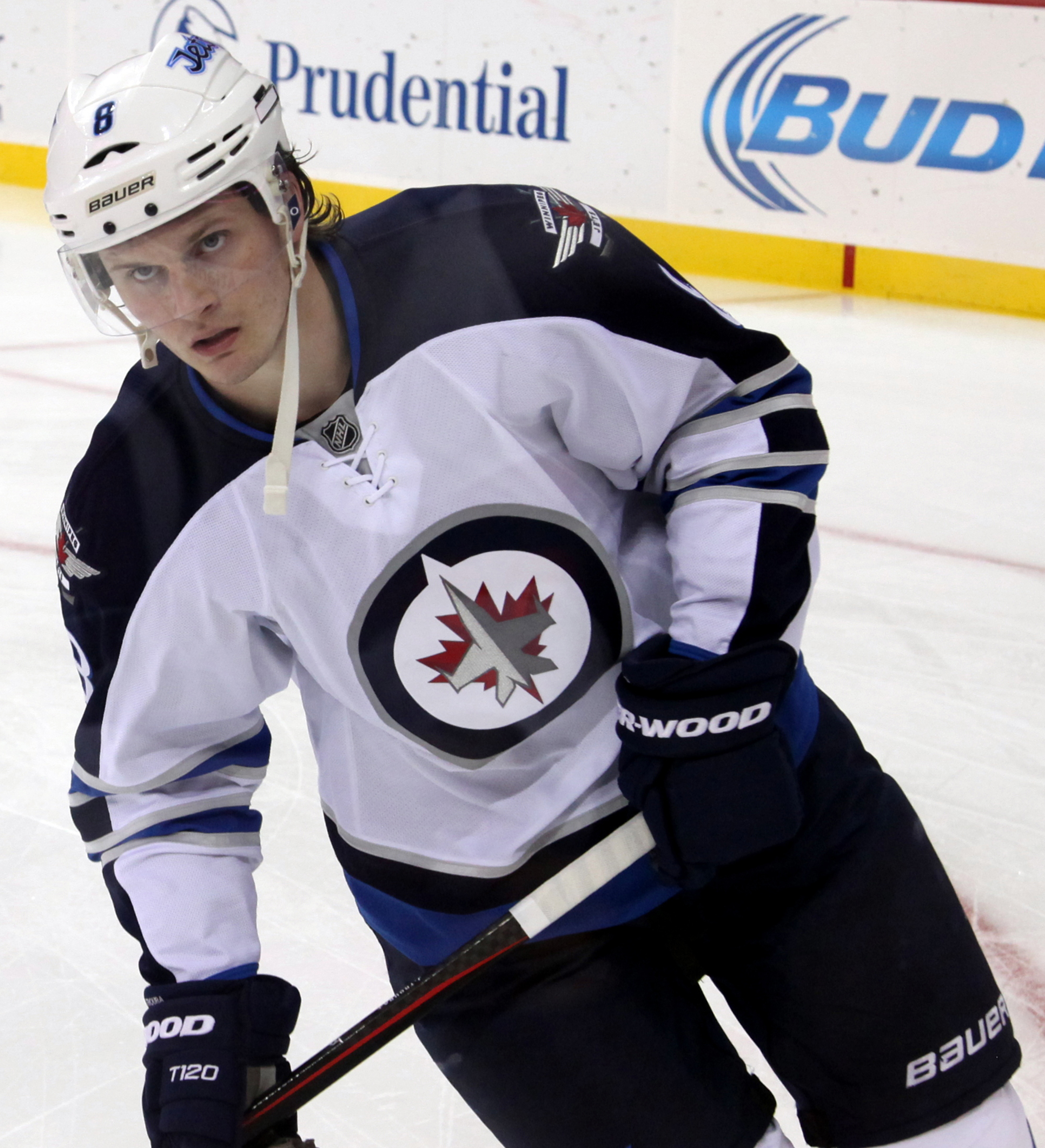
Trouba with the Winnipeg Jets in October 2014

Trouba was selected by the Winnipeg Jets of the National Hockey League (NHL) in the first round, ninth overall, of the 2012 NHL entry draft. He signed an entry-level contract with the Jets on April 2, 2013. On October 1, Trouba played his first career NHL game for the Jets, scoring his first NHL goal against Devan Dubnyk of the Edmonton Oilers. He also added an assist in the game and was named the game's first star. During his rookie season in 2013–14, Trouba missed over a month of action after he was injured in his eighth game when he fell into the boards after missing a bodycheck against the St. Louis Blues. He remained upbeat in the aftermath of his injury, updating fans on Twitter by saying, "If you were wondering, the boards are not edible. I'll be back soon." He appeared in 65 games with the Jets that season, scoring ten goals and 19 assists for 29 points. In the 2014–15 season, he played in 65 games with Winnipeg, marking seven goals and 22 points. He registered a three-point game on December 3, 2014, notching one goal and two assists in a 3–2 win over the Edmonton Oilers. However, later that month on December 16, he suffered an upper body injury that kept him out until February 2015. The Jets made the 2015 Stanley Cup playoffs and Trouba made his NHL playoff debut on April 16 in game one of the first round series versus the Anaheim Ducks. The Jets lost the game, but Trouba recorded his first NHL playoff point assisting on Adam Lowry's first period goal. The Jets were eliminated by the Ducks in four games, during which Trouba played with a broken hand. In the four games, he recorded two assists.

In the following 2015–16 season, Trouba played in nearly every game, getting into 81 with the Jets, while scoring six goals and 21 points. The Jets failed to make the playoffs and in the off-season, on September 23, 2016, Trouba released a statement through his agent stating that he had requested a trade from the Jets. However, on November 7, he agreed to a two-year, $6 million contract extension with the Jets, having missed the first 13 games of the 2016–17 season. Had he not signed by December 1, he would not have been eligible to play in the NHL for the rest of the season. He was a healthy scratch for the first two games after signing before making his season debut on November 11 against the Colorado Avalanche. In his shortened season he appeared in 60 games for Winnipeg, scoring eight goals and 33 points. On February 21, 2017, Trouba was suspended for two games by the NHL for an illegal check to the head of Ottawa Senators' forward Mark Stone and fined $33,333. He recorded a multi-goal game on April 6, scoring two against the Columbus Blue Jackets in a 5–4 victory.

In the 2017–18 season, Trouba appeared in 55 games, scoring three goals and 24 points. He missed 20 games with an ankle injury suffered in a game against the Anaheim Ducks on January 25, 2018. He returned to the lineup on March 15 against the Chicago Blackhawks, but in the next game against the Dallas Stars on March 18, he suffered a concussion after being hit by Jamie Benn. He returned to the lineup on March 31 as the Jets clinched a spot in the 2018 Stanley Cup playoffs. He appeared in 17 playoff games, scoring two goals and three points. His first NHL playoff goal was the game winner and series clincher in game five on April 20 of the first round series victory over the Minnesota Wild. Following the Jets' successful 2018 playoffs in which the team reached the conference finals for the first time in franchise history, Trouba filed for salary arbitration. On July 22, he was awarded a one-year, $5.5 million extension with the Jets.

Trouba finished the 2018–19 season having played in all 82 games, scoring eight goals and 50 points. He was one of only three defensemen under 25 to score 50 points or more, along with Morgan Rielly and Thomas Chabot. On October 20, he recorded a three-point game, registering three assists in a 5–3 victory over the Arizona Coyotes. He added a second three-point game on January 8, 2019, scoring a goal and adding two assists in a 7–4 win over the Colorado Avalanche. The Jets secured their spot in the 2019 Stanley Cup playoffs and in the first round, faced the St. Louis Blues. Trouba played in all six games in the series, marking one assist, as the Blues eliminated the Jets.

==== New York Rangers (2019–2024) ====
Following the 2018–19 season, Trouba and the Jets were once again unable to come to terms on an extension. One of his primary reasons for not signing was his then fiancee's desire to attend medical school in the United States.On June 17, 2019, Trouba was traded by the Jets to the New York Rangers in exchange for defenseman Neal Pionk and New York's first-round pick in the 2019 NHL entry draft, which had been previously acquired by the Rangers in exchange for the Jets receiving Kevin Hayes. On July 19, the Rangers signed Trouba to a seven-year, $56 million free-agent contract worth an average annual value of $8 million.

Trouba scored his first goal for the Rangers, as well as two assists, during the 2019–20 season opener on October 3 against his former team, the Winnipeg Jets. Trouba tied a career-high in points, and he became the first defenseman to register three points in a Rangers debut. He was fined $5,000 on January 12, 2020, by the NHL for a slashing infraction against Vince Dunn of the St. Louis Blues. He played in 70 games with the Rangers, scoring seven goals and 27 points before the NHL suspended the season due to the COVID-19 pandemic on March 12, 2020. When play resumed for the 2020 Stanley Cup playoffs, the Rangers faced the Carolina Hurricanes in the best-of-five qualifying round. Trouba played in all three games, registering one assist, as the Hurricanes swept the Rangers.

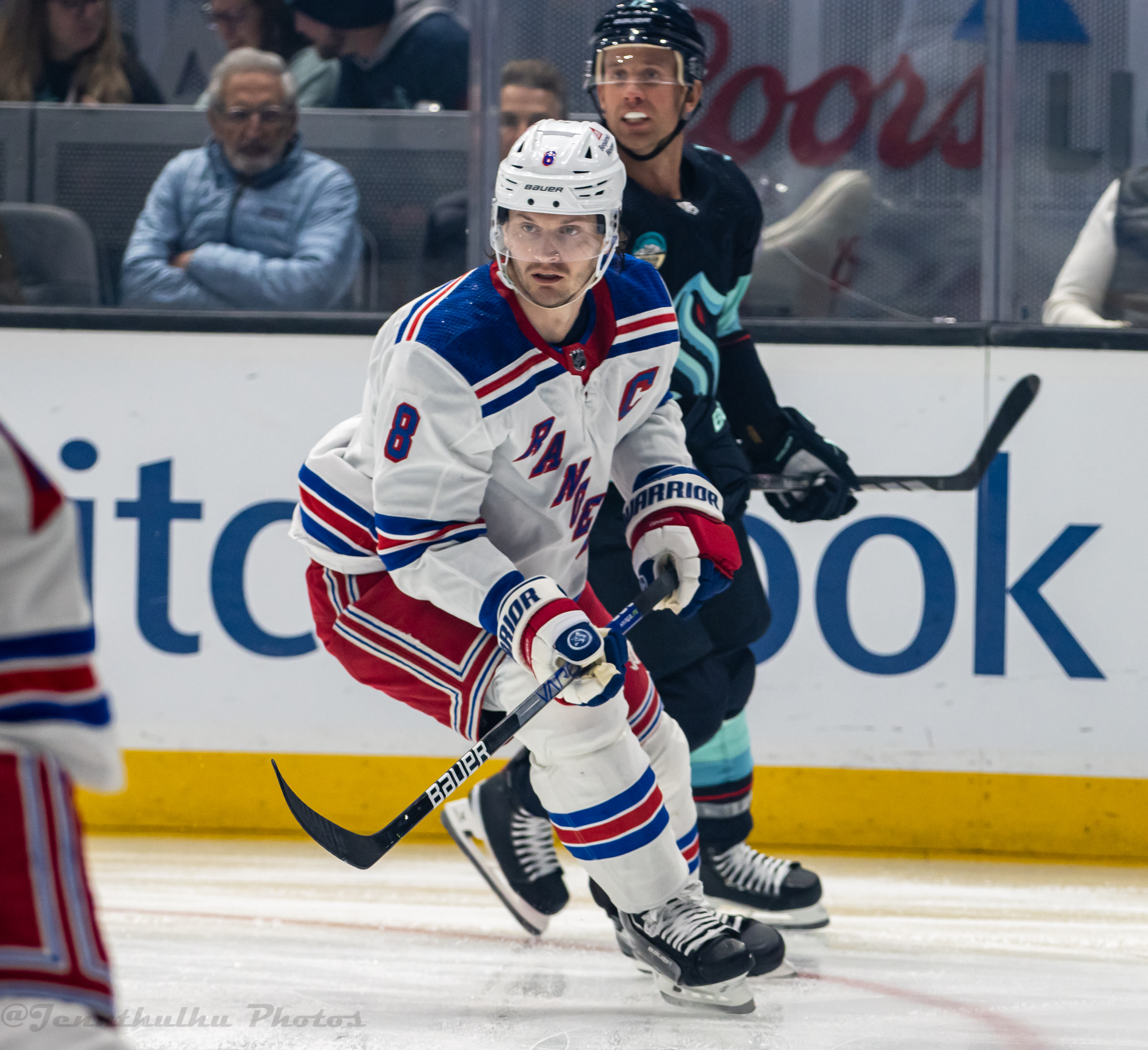
Trouba with the New York Rangers skating against Jaden Schwartz of the Seattle Kraken in October 2023

In his second season with the Rangers in the pandemic-shortened 2020–21 season, Trouba appeared in 38 games, marking two goals and 12 points. However, the team missed the playoffs. The following season in 2021–22 played in 81 games, scoring 11 goals and 39 points. He registered a three-point game on January 22, 2022, scoring two goals and marking one assist in a 7–3 victory over the Arizona Coyotes. The Rangers went on a deep run in the 2022 Stanley Cup playoffs, advancing to the Eastern Conference finals, but ultimately lost to the Tampa Bay Lightning in six games. Trouba appeared in 20 playoff games, scoring one goal and five points.

During the off-season, Trouba was named the 28th captain in franchise history. He was the first captain since Ryan McDonagh was traded during the 2017–18 season. He also became the 12th defenseman in team history to be named captain and the fourth consecutive U.S.-born player to wear the "C" on his sweater after Chris Drury (2008–2011), Ryan Callahan (2011–2014) and McDonagh (2014–2018). Trouba had served as an alternate captain the previous two years while being lauded for his leadership abilities by both his first Rangers coach, David Quinn, and his successor, Gerard Gallant.

During the 2022–23 season, during a 5–2 loss to the Chicago Blackhawks at home on December 3, Trouba was involved in two separate on-ice incidents. In the first period, he fought Jujhar Khaira, whom he had concussed and knocked unconscious with an open-ice hit in the last game between the Rangers and Blackhawks the previous season. Then, in the second period, with the Blackhawks leading 3–0, Trouba delivered an open-ice hit to Andreas Athanasiou, inciting a line brawl that included a fight between Trouba and Blackhawks captain Jonathan Toews. After the brawl, Trouba yelled at and threw his helmet towards the Rangers bench. The incident and game was seen as a turning point in the Rangers season, who entering the game, had a record of 11 wins, 10 losses and 5 overtime losses. After the incident, the team won 36 games, lost 12 and a further 8 in overtime. On April 5, 2023, Trouba was named the recipient of the second annual "Mr. Ranger Award" presented in memory of Rod Gilbert. The award is given to the Rangers player "who best honors Rod's legacy by exemplifying leadership qualities both on and off the ice, and making a significant humanitarian contribution to his community." He appeared in all 82 games for the Rangers that season, scoring eight goals and 30 points. In the 2023 Stanley Cup playoffs the Rangers faced the New Jersey Devils in the first round. The series went the full seven games, with the Devils prevailing. Trouba appeared in all seven games, going scoreless.

The 2023–24 regular season was a major success for the Rangers, who won the Presidents' Trophy as the league's top team. Trouba had three goals and 19 assists in 69 games, and received the Mark Messier Leadership Award in recognition of his "leadership qualities" and his extensive charitable activities. On November 25, he was fined $5,000 for a high-sticking infraction against Trent Frederic of the Boston Bruins. He was also suspended for two games on January 24, 2024, for elbowing Vegas Golden Knights' forward Pavel Dorofeyev. On March 4, 2024, he suffered an ankle injury and missed 11 games, returning to the lineup on March 30. He finished the season having appeared in 69 games, scoring three goals and 22 points. In the 2024 Stanley Cup playoffs, the Rangers advanced to the Eastern Conference final again, but were eliminated by the Florida Panthers in six games. During the series, Trouba was fined $5,000 for elbowing Evan Rodrigues in game three. Trouba scored one goal and seven points in 16 playoff games.

With the Rangers unhappy with Trouba's poor play relative to his expensive contract that still had two more years, in the 2024 off-season Trouba's name was consistently mentioned in trade rumors, including reports that a trade had been made with the Detroit Red Wings, though the team was on Trouba's list of places he did not want to be traded to, a list of 15 teams submitted each June of the existing contract which Trouba had reportedly filled with unlikely trade candidates as he did not want to be traded. Despite the rumours, he opened the 2024–25 season with the Rangers and appeared in 24 games, registering six assists. However, the rumors resumed after a memo that had been sent out by the Rangers to other NHL general managers listing the players available for trade, with Trouba's name among them, was leaked to the media in November. On December 6, with his future with the Rangers clouded and the team still trying to move him off the roster, it was revealed that Trouba would be held out of the lineup for that evening's game against the Pittsburgh Penguins. The team reportedly had a number of suitors interested in Trouba, but Trouba was not willing to waive his no-trade clause to go to them. He was told that he would be placed on waivers at 2 p.m. that day if he did not accept a trade, which would have allowed any team to claim Trouba for free, regardless of it they were on his no-trade list or not. The way in which Rangers' management had handled the Trouba situation was not well received by New York players and reportedly was one of the factors which affected the team's play during the 2024–25 season.

==== Anaheim Ducks (2024–2026) ====
Faced with the potential of being placed on waivers, Trouba accepted a trade to the Anaheim Ducks on December 6, 2024, with the Rangers receiving defenseman Urho Vaakanainen and a 2025 fourth-round pick from Anaheim. He made his Ducks debut on December 9 against the Montreal Canadiens. Trouba was paired with Cam Fowler and played well. However, the Ducks lost the game in the shootout 3–2.

==== San Jose Sharks (2026–present) ====
As a free agent from the Ducks, Trouba was signed to a four-year, $33 million contract with the San Jose Sharks on July 1, 2026. He made his Sharks debut on October 1, in a 4–3 overtime win against the Florida Panthers.

== International play ==
Medal record

Men's ice hockey

Representing the United States

World Championships
Bronze medal – third place	2013 Sweden/Finland	

World Junior Championships
Gold medal – first place	2013 Russia	

World U18 Championships
Gold medal – first place	2011 Germany	
Gold medal – first place	2012 Czech Republic	

World U-17 Hockey Challenge
Silver medal – second place	2010 Canada	

Trouba spent much of his amateur career playing for the USA Hockey National Team Development Program in the United States Hockey League (USHL) and at several international tournaments. He represented his country at two World U18 Championships, one World Junior Championships and one World Championships. In 2011 and 2012, Trouba captured gold medals with the United States at the World U18 Championships.

Trouba was the youngest player on the American team at the 2012 World Junior Championships. In 2013, he represented the United States at both the junior and senior levels, capturing gold and bronze medals, respectively. At the World Junior Championship in 2013, Trouba was named the tournament's top defenseman and earned a spot on the All-Star Team.

Trouba represented the United States again at the 2014 and 2017 World Championships, where the team would come in sixth place and fifth place, respectively. In 2017, Trouba was first in points among defensemen, registering three points (one goal, two assists) in eight games.

== Personal life ==
Trouba was born to parents John and Kristy and has a younger brother Chris. His brother also plays ice hockey and most recently played with the Plattsburgh State Cardinals. On June 28, 2020, he posted on Instagram that he married his long-time girlfriend, Kelly Tyson.

Trouba has been a longtime supporter and activist for the LGBTQ+ community. As part of the NHL's Hockey is For Everyone initiative in February 2017, Trouba was named the Winnipeg Jets' LGBTQ ambassador for You Can Play, a social activism campaign aiming to end homophobia in sports. In February 2018, he appeared in a promotional video for them as part of the Jets' You Can Play night. In 2021, Trouba tweeted in support of Luke Prokop, the first player drafted by a NHL team to come out as gay. Speaking to a NHL writer, Trouba said, "It shows a lot of courage from him and maybe kind of opens eyes for some other people to feel comfortable being themselves as well... We talk about how Hockey is for Everyone, we do Pride Night. They're not just words. We want people to feel supported in the League."

In September 2017, Trouba's Jets' teammate Blake Wheeler criticized then-U.S. president Donald Trump's comments on National Football League players kneeling during the national anthem. Trouba supported Wheeler and stated, "It takes a lot of courage to stand up to that, so I think it's courageous what Blake did and what a lot of athletes are doing." Furthermore, Trouba said that sports had become more political than at the start of his career "but Donald Trump also wasn't president at that point."

During the Black Lives Matter protests following the Murder of George Floyd in May 2020, Trouba shared a statement on Twitter in a series of posts acknowledging his privilege as a white man and urging people to listen and learn, concluding with "Black Lives Matter." He was one of several Rangers players to speak out publicly while the organization itself remained the only NHL team not to issue a statement.

On April 7, 2021, Trouba was the first NHL player to allow himself to be publicly photographed receiving the COVID-19 vaccine. With his wife having done rotations in the emergency room in Florida during the height of the COVID-19 pandemic, he stated, "people can make their own decisions, but the right one would be to get vaccinated."

In September 2022, Trouba and his wife, Kelly, founded The Trouba Creative Expressions Arts Program. The 10-week program, run in partnership with the Epilepsy Foundation of Metropolitan New York, provides group and individual art-therapy sessions for adults with epilepsy and seizure disorders.

Trouba has also been involved with the Garden of Dreams Foundation, which supports young people facing illness, financial hardship, or the loss of a family member in uniform. In 2023, he presented a law-school scholarship through the foundation to Isaiah Marquez-Greene, a survivor of the Sandy Hook Elementary School shooting whose sister was killed in the attack.

Trouba is a visual artist, sharing his first paintings on Instagram in mid-2023. Trouba creates his works with artist Michael Geschwer by skating into blank canvases while wearing full hockey gear coated in paint. He held his first exhibition from August 1 through August 23, 2024, at Harper's Gallery in New York City. Trouba auctions his own artwork and donates the proceeds to support his arts program and the Garden of Dreams Foundation.

In April 2024, Trouba and his mother, Kristy, starred in AstraZeneca's "Get Body Checked Against Cancer" ad campaign in partnership with the NHL and Hockey Fights Cancer. The campaign encouraged fans to get regular cancer screenings, playing on Trouba's notoriety for body checks.

In early June 2024, Trouba was verbally targeted in an episode of the hockey podcast, Spittin' Chiclets, hosted by former NHL players Ryan Whitney and Paul Bissonnette. Whitney made a joke about Trouba joining the Women's National Basketball Association, saying "Trouba just needs to go to become a he/she and boom he's in the league!" Bissonnette responded by saying, "yea, he should chop his cock off." On June 5, in response to that attack and an attack a few days earlier regarding his play during that year's playoffs, Trouba tweeted at Spittin' Chiclets. His statement spoke to suicide rates among college athletes, the recent suicide of a PGA golfer, and pushed for more mental health awareness. For the next 30 days he sent all proceeds from his artwork to Athletes for Hope, a non-profit organization supporting athletes through community service and social activism.

== Career statistics ==
=== Regular season and playoffs ===
			Regular season					Playoffs
Season	Team	League	GP	G	A	Pts	PIM	GP	G	A	Pts	PIM
2010–11	U.S. NTDP Juniors	USHL	31	3	4	7	31	—	—	—	—	—
2010–11	U.S. NTDP U17	USDP	17	4	12	16	18	—	—	—	—	—
2010–11	U.S. NTDP U18	USDP	10	1	2	3	10	—	—	—	—	—
2011–12	U.S. NTDP Juniors	USHL	22	4	14	18	35	—	—	—	—	—
2011–12	U.S. NTDP U18	USDP	32	5	9	14	36	—	—	—	—	—
2012–13	University of Michigan	CCHA	37	12	17	29	88	—	—	—	—	—
2013–14	Winnipeg Jets	NHL	65	10	19	29	43	—	—	—	—	—
2014–15	Winnipeg Jets	NHL	65	7	15	22	46	4	0	2	2	2
2015–16	Winnipeg Jets	NHL	81	6	15	21	62	—	—	—	—	—
2016–17	Winnipeg Jets	NHL	60	8	25	33	54	—	—	—	—	—
2017–18	Winnipeg Jets	NHL	55	3	21	24	34	17	2	1	3	17
2018–19	Winnipeg Jets	NHL	82	8	42	50	58	6	0	1	1	4
2019–20	New York Rangers	NHL	70	7	20	27	61	3	0	1	1	0
2020–21	New York Rangers	NHL	38	2	10	12	22	—	—	—	—	—
2021–22	New York Rangers	NHL	81	11	28	39	88	20	1	4	5	25
2022–23	New York Rangers	NHL	82	8	22	30	63	7	0	0	0	6
2023–24	New York Rangers	NHL	69	3	19	22	73	16	1	6	7	22
2024–25	New York Rangers	NHL	24	0	6	6	22	—	—	—	—	—
2024–25	Anaheim Ducks	NHL	53	1	7	8	44	—	—	—	—	—
2025–26	Anaheim Ducks	NHL	81	10	25	35	31	12	1	0	1	4
NHL totals			906	84	274	358	701	85	5	15	20	80

=== International ===
Year	Team	Event	Result	GP	G	A	Pts	PIM
2011	United States	U17	2nd place, silver medalist(s)	5	2	7	9	10
2011	United States	U18	1st place, gold medalist(s)	6	1	0	1	0
2012	United States	WJC	7th	6	0	2	2	0
2012	United States	U18	1st place, gold medalist(s)	6	1	2	3	8
2013	United States	WJC	1st place, gold medalist(s)	7	4	5	9	10
2013	United States	WC	3rd place, bronze medalist(s)	7	1	2	3	2
2014	United States	WC	6th	4	2	1	3	8
2016	Team North America	WCH	5th	2	0	0	0	0
2017	United States	WC	5th	8	1	2	3	2
Junior totals				30	8	16	24	28
Senior totals				21	4	5	9	12

== Awards and honors ==
Award	Year	Ref
USHL
All-Star Game	2011–12	
College
All-CCHA Rookie Team	2012–13	
All-CCHA Best Offensive Defenseman	2012–13	
All-CCHA First Team	2012–13	
AHCA West First-Team All-American	2012–13	
CCHA All-Tournament Team	2013	
NHL
Mark Messier Leadership Award	2023–24	
International
World Junior Championships Top 3 Player on Team	2013	
World Junior Championships All-Star Team	2013	
World Junior Championships Best Defenseman	2013	
New York Rangers
Mr. Ranger Award	2023	

Awards and achievements
Preceded by Mark Scheifele	Winnipeg Jets first-round draft pick 2012	Succeeded by Josh Morrissey
Preceded by Torey Krug	CCHA Best Offensive Defenseman; 2012–13	Succeeded by Award discontinued
Sporting positions
Preceded by Ryan McDonagh	New York Rangers captain 2022–2024	Succeeded by J. T. Miller
