= Cole Perfetti =

Canadian ice hockey player (born 2002)

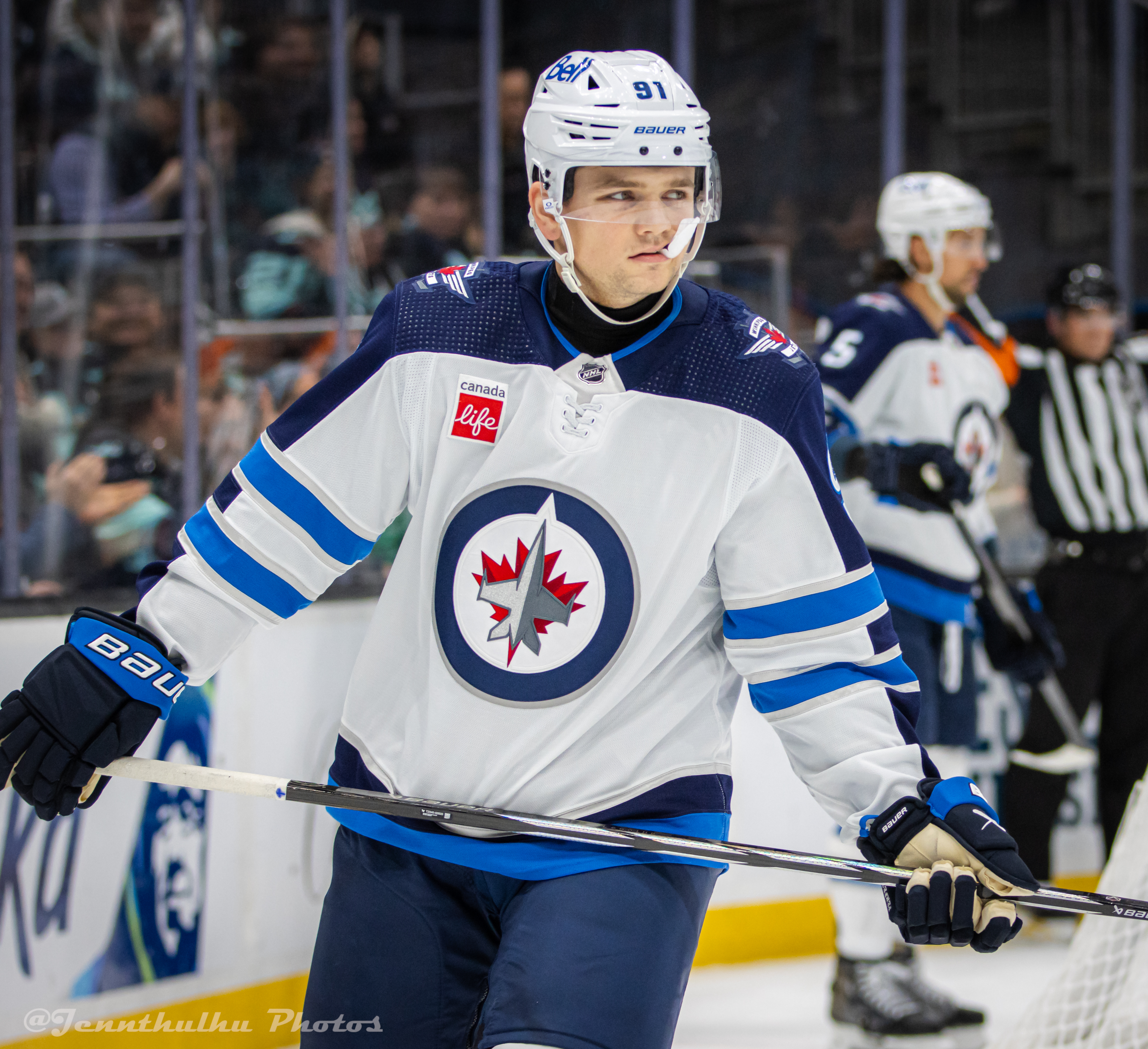
- Perfetti with the Winnipeg Jets in 2024.
- Born: January 1, 2002 (age 24) Whitby, Ontario, Canada
- Height: 5 ft 11 in (180 cm)
- Weight: 185 lb (84 kg; 13 st 3 lb)
- Position: Forward
- Shoots: Left
- NHL team: Winnipeg Jets
- National team: Canada
- NHL draft: 10th overall, 2020; Winnipeg Jets
- Playing career: 2021–present

Cole Perfetti (born January 1, 2002) is a Canadian professional ice hockey player who is a forward for the Winnipeg Jets of the National Hockey League (NHL). He was selected tenth overall by the Jets in the 2020 NHL entry draft.

Growing up in Whitby, Ontario, Perfetti spent his minor hockey career with the Whitby Wildcats. As a teenager, he enrolled at The Hill Academy while also playing for the Vaughan Kings of the Greater Toronto Hockey League. In the year before his Ontario Hockey League (OHL) eligibility, Perfetti led them in scoring with a total of 52 goals and 73 assists for 125 points. As a result of his play, Perfetti was recruited to join the University of Michigan's men's ice hockey team but ultimately chose to join the Saginaw Spirit of the OHL.

During his OHL career, Perfetti set numerous franchise records due to his scoring prowess. As a rookie, he set a new franchise record for most goals scored by a rookie and earned consideration as a highly touted prospect. In his second season, Perfetti recorded 102 points through 56 games to set a new franchise record while also helping them clinch a spot in the 2020 OHL playoffs. Due to the COVID-19 pandemic, his second season was cut short and he joined the Jets' American Hockey League (AHL) affiliate, the Manitoba Moose, to start his professional career.

== Early life ==
Perfetti was born on January 1, 2002, in Whitby, Ontario, to parents Angelo and Sandra. His father formerly served as a scout for the Arizona Coyotes of the National Hockey League.

== Playing career ==
=== Amateur ===
Growing up in Whitby, Ontario, Perfetti spent his minor hockey career with the Whitby Wildcats. At the age of 10, he won the Brick Invitational Super Novice Hockey Tournament in Edmonton along with his Toronto Bulldogs teammates. During the tournament, he tallied nine points in six games. Following this, Perfetti enrolled at The Hill Academy while also playing for the Vaughan Kings of the Greater Toronto Hockey League. In the year before his Ontario Hockey League (OHL) eligibility, Perfetti led them in scoring with a total of 52 goals and 73 assists for 125 points.

As a result of his GTHL play, Perfetti was recruited to join the University of Michigan's men's ice hockey team for the 2018–19 season. However, after being drafted fifth overall by the Saginaw Spirit during the 2018 OHL Priority selection draft, he rescinded his commitment and joined the OHL. Perfetti began his rookie campaign by scoring the first goal of the 2018–19 season in his OHL debut on September 19, 2018. As the season progressed, Perfetti continued to produce offensively and quickly surpassed Jan Mursak to set a new franchise record for most goals scored by a rookie. At the time of his record-setting goal, Perfetti also led all league rookies in goals and points through 53 games. His scoring prowess helped lead the Spirit to their 40th win of the season for the first time since 2010–11. As such, he was named one of the OHL Rookies of the Month for February. He earned this honour again in March after leading all rookies with seven goals and four assists through eight games to help the Spirit secure its first West Division title since 2011. On March 9, he became the first 16-year-old rookie to record four goals in one game since Ryan Spooner did so in March 2009. Although Perfetti helped the Spirit qualify for the OHL playoffs, they were eliminated in Game Seven of the Western Conference Championship Series by the Guelph Storm. He finished the regular season with 37 goals for 74 points through 63 games but lost the 2019 Rookie of The Year Award to Quinton Byfield.

As a result of his rookie season with the Spirit, Perfetti was considered a highly touted prospect for the 2020 NHL entry draft by the NHL Central Scouting Bureau. He returned to the Spirit for the 2019–20 season where he greatly improved on his previous seasons total. By February 2020, Perfetti recorded 102 points through 56 games to set a new franchise record while also helping them clinch a spot in the 2020 OHL Playoffs. He finished the season first on the Spirit in scoring and second in the league overall with 37 goals and 74 assists through 61 games. As a result of his play, Perfetti was named to 2019-20 OHL Second All-Star Team and ranked fourth among North American skaters eligible for the 2020 NHL draft. He was also named the Canadian Hockey League's Scholastic Player of the Year after maintaining a 93 percent academic average throughout the year.

Before the 2020 NHL entry draft, broadcaster Bob McKenzie ranked him highly on TSN's Final Draft list. While McKenzie was critical of Perfetti's speed, he praised Perfetti's hockey intelligence, creativity, and goal-scoring ability. After his selection by the Winnipeg Jets in the first round (10th overall) of the 2020 NHL entry draft, Perfetti was signed to a three-year, entry-level contract with the Jets on November 10, 2020.

=== Professional ===
Following the signing of his entry-level contract, Perfetti joined the Jets' American Hockey League (AHL) affiliate, the Manitoba Moose, for the 2020–21 season. Due to the ongoing restrictions in the COVID-19 pandemic, the start of the regular season was pushed back to February 5, 2021. Perfetti subsequently made his professional debut with the Moose on February 15, 2021, in a 3–2 loss to the Toronto Marlies. During the game, he also scored his first professional goal. Following his debut, Perfetti tallied two goals and two assists in his first 10 professional games. He continued to produce as the season continued and was eventually honored as the CCM/AHL Rookie of the Month for April after tallying 13 points through nine games during the month. His eight goals and 15 assists overall placed him sixth among rookie scorers with 23 points. Perfetti thus became the first forward and fourth player in franchise history to earn this honor. Perfetti finished the season with nine goals and 17 assists for 26 points to earn the team's Rookie of the Year Award.

Perfetti made his NHL debut on October 13, 2021, against the Anaheim Ducks. In his debut, he recorded one hit through 9:49 minutes of ice time in the eventual 4–1 loss. He played in one more game for the Jets before being assigned to their AHL affiliate, the Manitoba Moose. He later scored his first NHL goal January 18, 2022, in a loss to the Washington Capitals.

On December 31, Perfetti was the victim of an alleged high-stick from Minnesota Wild forward Ryan Hartman on the second half of a back-to-back matchup between the Wild and Jets. In a game the day prior on December 30, Wild star Kirill Kaprizov was injured from a pair of cross-checks from Jets defenceman Brenden Dillon. The next night, 1:51 into the first period of the rematch, Hartman told Perfetti that he was going to intentionally high-stick him as retribution for Kaprizov's injury, despite Perfetti not being involved in the play which injured Kaprizov. On the ensuing faceoff, Hartman hit Perfetti in the face with an illegal high-stick. Although the play was not called a penalty by the referees, Perfertti was wearing a microphone when the exchange occurred which picked up audio of the interaction. Perfetti was not injured on the play but required stitches from the high-stick. On January 2, 2024, the NHL fined Hartman $4,427.08 for high-sticking Perfetti, the maximum allowable under the league's collective bargaining agreement for an infraction which does not involve an injury or game misconduct penalty resulting from a play. After three days of silence following the breaking of the story, Hartman publicly denied that he had intentionally high-sticked Perfetti and instead claimed that Perfetti had baited Hartman into claiming responsibility for the incident during the match; audio of the exchange was not released after the Wild organization and National Hockey League Players' Association objected to its release. On January 24, 2025, Perfetti scored his first career NHL hat trick in a 5–2 Jets victory over the Utah Hockey Club.

On May 4, 2025, Perfetti scored the game-tying goal with 1.6 seconds left in regulation of game seven of his Jets' first round series to tie the game against the St. Louis Blues 3–3, which the Jets eventually won 4–3 in double overtime. It was the latest game-tying or winning goal in regulation in NHL playoff history.

After becoming a restricted free agent at the end of the 2025–26 season, Perfetti re-signed with the Jets to a 5-year contract extension on July 15, 2026.

== International play ==
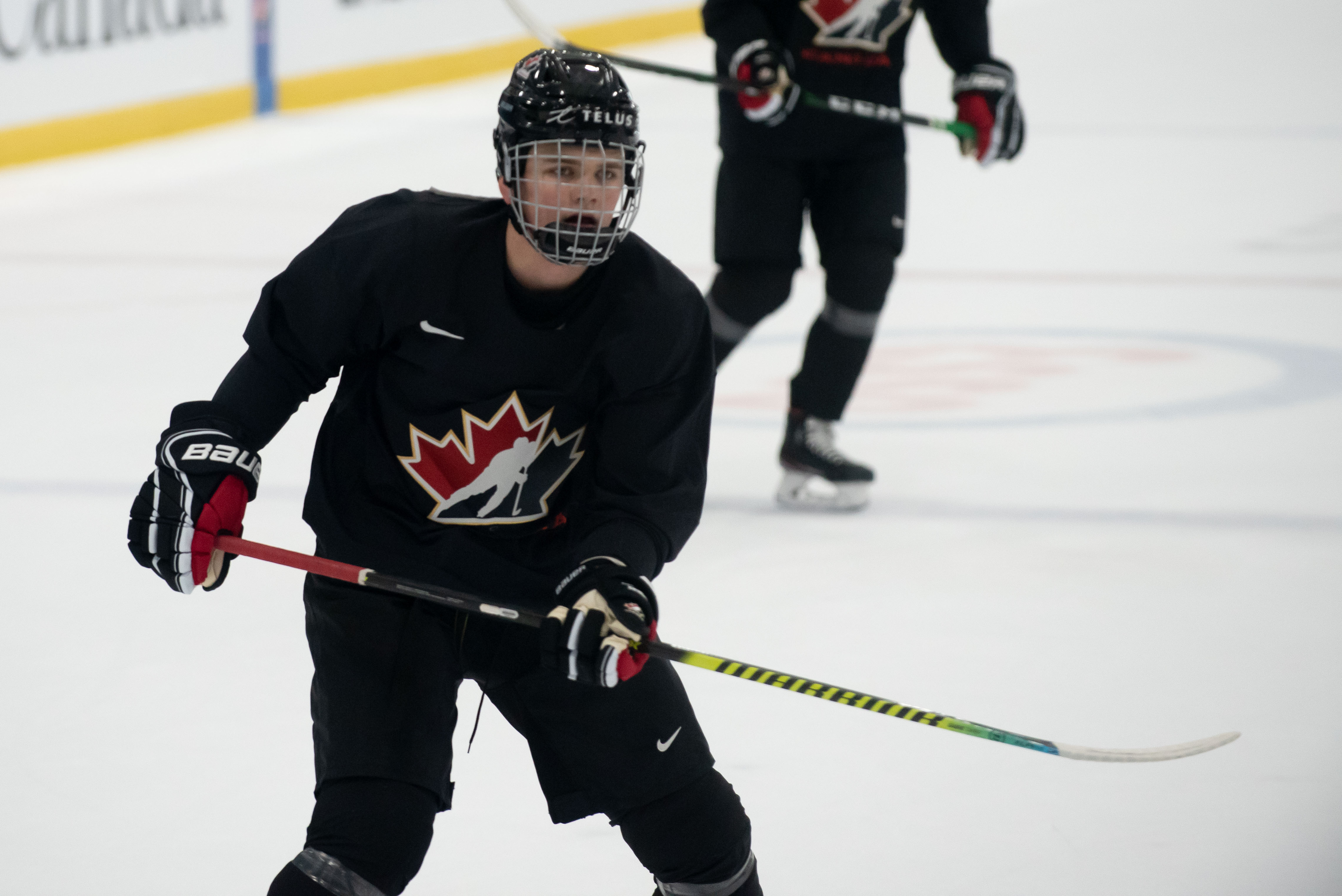
- Perfetti during World Junior selection camp in 2019

Medal record

Representing Canada

Ice hockey

World Championships
Gold medal – first place	2021 Latvia	

World Junior Championships
Silver medal – second place	2021 Canada	

Hlinka Gretzky Cup
Silver medal – second place	2019 Slovakia	

Perfetti played for Team Canada White at the 2018-19 U17 World Hockey Challenge. He finished second in the tournament scoring 2 goals and 7 assists in five games.

Following his success at the U17 World Hockey Challenge, Perfetti was chosen to represent Team Canada at the 2019 Hlinka Gretzky Cup. During the tournament, he scored 8 goals and 4 assists. In the semi-finals he scored two goals in regulation and added another three goals through eight rounds of shootout to lead Team Canada to the gold medal round. He led the tournament with 12 points through five games to set a new tournament record as Canada clinched a silver medal. He was invited to participate in Team Canada's camp for the 2020 World Junior Ice Hockey Championships but was cut before the final roster decisions.

Perfetti eventually made Team Canada's junior team for the 2021 World Junior Ice Hockey Championships after scoring impressing the coaching staff through intrasquad games during the camp. Perfetti also made Canada's 2022 World Junior Team and was named alternate captain. The tournament, being held in Edmonton, was cancelled after 2 games due to COVID. Perfetti scored 1 goal and 5 assists to lead the tournament in scoring though the first two games.

Perfetti made his senior international debut with Team Canada at the 2021 IIHF World Championship in Latvia. During the tournament, he helped Team Canada overcome a 0–3 record by scoring two goals en route to a gold medal.

== Player profile ==
Described as a player with a high hockey IQ, Perfetti has drawn comparisons to Nikita Kucherov by hockey pundits before his draft. Craig Button of TSN described Perfetti as "an elite scoring left winger in the mold of New York Rangers star Artemi Panarin." After being drafted by the Jets, general manager Kevin Cheveldayoff cited his playmaking, his creativeness, and his ability to manipulate defenders as reasons for drafting him, seeing it as ideal for the team.

== Personal life ==
During the COVID-19 pandemic, Perfetti started a non-profit organization called "Fetts’ Friends" to provide meals to the Environmental Service and Supply Chain employees at Covenant HealthCare.

== Career statistics ==
=== Regular season and playoffs ===
			Regular season					Playoffs
Season	Team	League	GP	G	A	Pts	PIM	GP	G	A	Pts	PIM
2017–18	Whitby Fury	OJHL	5	2	4	6	0	—	—	—	—	—
2018–19	Saginaw Spirit	OHL	63	37	37	74	10	16	8	6	14	4
2019–20	Saginaw Spirit	OHL	61	37	74	111	16	—	—	—	—	—
2020–21	Manitoba Moose	AHL	32	9	17	26	2	—	—	—	—	—
2021–22	Winnipeg Jets	NHL	18	2	5	7	0	—	—	—	—	—
2021–22	Manitoba Moose	AHL	17	6	9	15	2	—	—	—	—	—
2022–23	Winnipeg Jets	NHL	51	8	22	30	16	—	—	—	—	—
2023–24	Winnipeg Jets	NHL	71	19	19	38	12	1	0	0	0	0
2024–25	Winnipeg Jets	NHL	82	18	32	50	20	13	3	3	6	2
2025–26	Winnipeg Jets	NHL	68	12	20	32	20	—	—	—	—	—
NHL totals			290	59	98	157	68	14	3	3	6	2

=== International ===
Year	Team	Event	Result	GP	G	A	Pts	PIM
2018	Canada White	U17	6th	5	2	7	9	4
2019	Canada	HG18	2nd place, silver medalist(s)	5	8	4	12	2
2021	Canada	WJC	2nd place, silver medalist(s)	7	2	4	6	2
2021	Canada	WC	1st place, gold medalist(s)	10	2	0	2	4
Junior totals				17	12	15	27	8
Senior totals				10	2	0	2	4

== Awards and honours ==
Award	Year
OHL
First All-Rookie Team	2019
Second All-Star Team	2020
Bobby Smith Trophy	2020
CHL Scholastic Player of the Year	2020
AHL
Rookie of the Month	April 2021
Manitoba Moose Rookie of the Year	2021

Awards and achievements
Preceded by Ville Heinola	Winnipeg Jets first-round draft pick 2020	Succeeded by Chaz Lucius
