= 2019 Hlinka Gretzky Cup =

Tournament details
- Host countries: Slovakia; Czech Republic
- Venues: 2 (in 2 host cities)
- Dates: 5–10 August
- Teams: 8

Final positions
- Champions: Russia (4th title)
- Runners-up: Canada
- Third place: Sweden
- Fourth place: Finland

Tournament statistics
- Games played: 18
- Goals scored: 116 (6.44 per game)
- Attendance: 14,460 (803 per game)
- Scoring leader: (Canada) Cole Perfetti (12 points)

Official website
- hlinkagretzky.cz

The 2019 Hlinka Gretzky Cup was an under-18 international ice hockey tournament that was held in Piešťany, Slovakia and Břeclav, Czech Republic from 5 to 10 August 2019 at Alcaplast Arena in Břeclav and Easton Arena in Piešťany. Team Russia won the gold medal for the first time since 1995, with a 3–2 win over Canada in the final.

== Preliminary round ==
All times are Central European Summer Time (UTC+2).

=== Group A ===
Pos	Team	Pld	W	OTW	OTL	L	GF	GA	GD	Pts	Qualification
1	Canada	3	3	0	0	0	21	1	+20	9	Semifinals
2	Finland	3	2	0	0	1	11	7	+4	6	Semifinals
3	Czech Republic (H)	3	0	1	0	2	6	15	−9	2	Fifth place game
4	Switzerland	3	0	0	1	2	3	18	−15	1	Seventh place game

Source: hlinkagretzky.com
(H) Host

5 August; 15:30	Finland	0–6 (0–3, 0–1, 0–2)	Canada	Alcaplast Arena, Břeclav; Attendance: 425

Game reference
8 min	Penalties	22 min
17	Shots	34

5 August; 19:00	Czech Republic	4–3 GWS (2–1, 0–2, 1–0); OT: (0–0); SO: (1–0)	Switzerland	Alcaplast Arena, Břeclav; Attendance: 1,548

Game reference

6 August; 15:30	Canada	8–0 (3–0, 3–0, 2–0)	Switzerland	Alcaplast Arena, Břeclav; Attendance: 486

Game reference
14 min	Penalties	12 min
48	Shots	8

6 August; 19:00	Czech Republic	1–5 (0–1, 0–4, 1–0)	Finland	Alcaplast Arena, Břeclav; Attendance: 1,911

Game reference

7 August; 15:30	Switzerland	0–6 (0–2, 0–3, 0–1)	Finland	Alcaplast Arena, Břeclav; Attendance: 268

Game reference

7 August; 19:00	Czech Republic	1–7 (0–2, 0–2, 1–3)	Canada	Alcaplast Arena, Břeclav; Attendance: 2,128

Game reference
10 min	Penalties	16 min
21	Shots	42

=== Group B ===
Pos	Team	Pld	W	OTW	OTL	L	GF	GA	GD	Pts	Qualification
1	Russia	3	2	1	0	0	11	3	+8	8	Semifinals
2	Sweden	3	1	1	0	1	8	9	−1	5	Semifinals
3	United States	3	0	1	1	1	10	14	−4	3	Fifth place game
4	Slovakia (H)	3	0	0	2	1	6	9	−3	2	Seventh place game

Source: hlinkagretzky.com
(H) Host

5 August; 15:30	Russia	6–2 (1–1, 4–0, 2–1)	United States	Easton Arena, Piešťany; Attendance: 260

Game reference

5 August; 19:00	Slovakia	2–3 (1–1, 0–1, 1–1)	Sweden	Easton Arena, Piešťany; Attendance: 649

Game reference

6 August; 15:30	Sweden	0–3 (0–0, 0–0, 0–3)	Russia	Easton Arena, Piešťany; Attendance: 321

Game reference

6 August; 19:00	Slovakia	3–4 OT (1–2, 1–0, 1–1); OT: (0–1)	United States	Easton Arena, Piešťany; Attendance: 1,212

Game reference

7 August; 15:30	United States	4–5 GWS (1–1, 2–0, 1–3); OT: (0–0); SO: (0–1)	Sweden	Easton Arena, Piešťany; Attendance: 348

Game reference

7 August; 19:00	Slovakia	1–2 OT (0–0, 0–1, 1–0); OT: (0–1)	Russia	Easton Arena, Piešťany; Attendance: 1,363

Game reference
Simon Latkoczy	Goalies	Yaroslav Askarov
6 min	Penalties	10 min
32	Shots	20

== Final round ==
=== Semifinal playoff bracket ===
The semi-finals were decided on 7 August, 2019 after Group A and B completed three round-robin games each. The winner of Group A (Canada) played the runner-up of Group B (Sweden), while the winner of Group B (Russia) played the runner-up of Group A (Finland). The semifinals were held on 9 August 2019 and the gold medal and bronze medal games were held the following day on 10 August 2019.

Semifinal — 9 Aug
A1	Canada (GWS)	3
B2	Sweden	2
B1	Russia	4
A2	Finland	1

Gold medal game — 10 Aug
W1	Canada	2
W2	Russia	3
Bronze medal game — 10 Aug
L1	Sweden	5
L2	Finland	1

=== Seventh place game ===
9 August 2019; 15:30	Slovakia	7–5 (2–2, 3–0, 2–3)	Switzerland	Easton Arena, Piešťany; Attendance: 554

Game reference

Simon Latkóczy
Goalies
Noah Patenaude, Andri Henauer

	0–1	03:29 – Robin (Derungs)
	0–2	07:12 – Struele (Zaugg, Nussbaumer)
Bačo (Jombik, Faith) – 10:09	1–2
Myklukha (Faith, Chromiak) (PP) – 13:47	2–2
Kašlík (Kolenič) – 21:31	3–2
Petráš (Nemec) – 31:18	4–2
Chromiak – 37:08	5–2
	5–3	42:09 – Zaugg (Hofer, Lindemann)
	5–4	49:23 – Fahrni (Meier) (PP)
Kašlík (Kolenič, Rehák – 53:23	6–4
	6–5	54:07 – Allenspach (Knak)
Myklukha (EN) – 59:22	7–5

6 min
Penalties
16 min
29
Shots
24

=== Fifth place game ===
9 August 2019; 15:30	United States	3–4 OT (0–2, 1–0, 2–1); OT: (0–1)	Czech Republic	Alcaplast Arena, Břeclav; Attendance: 723

Game reference

Colin Purcell
Goalies
Jan Bednář

	0–1	07:53 – Michal Gut (Chlubna)
	0–2	10:28 – Handl (Macháček) (PP)
Williams (SH) – 35:29	1–2
Hanas (Kelly) – 51:31	2–2
	2–3	51:48 – Myšák (Malat, Vacik)
Ellis (Kelly) – 57:35	3–3
	3–4	66:58 – Novák (Chlubna)

20 min
Penalties
14 min
26
Shots
18

=== Semifinals ===
9 August 2019; 19:00	Russia	4–1 (1–1, 0–0, 3–0)	Finland	Easton Arena, Piešťany; Attendance: 407

Game reference

Yaroslav Askarov
Goalies
Joel Blomqvist

Pashin (Ponomaryov, Tyutnev) – 06:11	1–0
	1–1	10:36 – Mäenpää (Korkalainen, Luoto)
Zolodeyev (Didkovsky, Trineyev) – 51:29	2–1
Pashin – 57:28	3–1
Pashin (Gushchin) – 57:01	4–1

10 min
Penalties
10 min
33
Shots
27

9 August 2019; 19:00	Canada	3–2 GWS (0–1, 2–1, 0–0); OT: (0–0); SO: (1–0)	Sweden	Alcaplast Arena, Břeclav; Attendance: 595

Game reference

Tristan Lennox
Goalies
Jesper Wallstedt

	0–1	08:29 – Ljungman (PP)
Perfetti (Lapierre) – 20:35	1–1
	1–2	24:16 – Styf (Lööf)
Perfetti – 34:22	2–2

Jarvis (miss)
Perfetti
Byfield (miss)
Lapierre (miss)
McClennon (miss)
Perfetti (miss)
Perfetti
Perfetti
Shootout
Ljungman
(miss) Grans
(miss) Hedlund
(miss) Eklund
(miss) Nybeck
(miss) Ljungman
Ljungman
(miss) Ljungman
12 min
Penalties
6 min
41
Shots
23

=== Bronze medal game ===
10 August 2019; 17:00	Finland	1–5 (1–1, 0–2, 0–2)	Sweden	Easton Arena, Piešťany; Attendance: 428

Game reference

Joel Blomqvist
Goalies
Calle Clang

	0–1	08:08 – Ljungman (Eklund)
Korkalainen (Puutio, Hirvonen) (PP) – 18:38	1–1
	1–2	30:35 – Garfve (Andrae, Nybeck) (PP)
	1–3	34:53 – Ekmark (PP)
	1–4	45:31 – Torgersson
	1–5	55:41 – Torgersson (Nybeck) (SH)

12 min
Penalties
10 min
37
Shots
31

=== Final ===
10 August 2019; 17:00	Canada	2–3 (0–1, 1–1, 1–1)	Russia	Alcaplast Arena, Břeclav; Attendance: 834

Game reference

Dylan Garand
Goalies
Yaroslav Askarov
Referees:
(Czech Republic) Oldřich Hejduk
(Czech Republic) Daniel Pražák
Linesmen:
(Czech Republic) Miroslav Lhotský
(Czech Republic) Roman Svoboda

	0–1	03:45 – Pashin (Ponomaryov)
Byfield (McClennon, Lapierre) (PP) – 23:03	1–1
	1–2	28:09 – Ponomaryov
	1–3	48:38 – Pashin (Tyutnev)
Foudy – 55:01	2–3

6 min
Penalties
12 min
37
Shots
13

== Statistics ==
=== Top scorers ===
List shows the top ten skaters sorted by points, then goals.

Player	GP	G	A	Pts	PIM
(Canada) Cole Perfetti	5	8	4	12	2
(Canada) Hendrix Lapierre	5	3	8	11	4
(Russia) Alexander Pashin	5	7	1	8	0
(Finland) Roni Hirvonen	5	4	2	6	6
(Sweden) Daniel Ljungman	5	5	0	5	2
(Canada) Quinton Byfield	5	3	2	5	4
(Russia) Vasili Ponomaryov	5	2	3	5	2
(Canada) Justin Sourdif	5	1	4	5	2
(Czech Republic) Michal Gut	4	3	1	4	2
(Slovakia) Matej Kašlík	4	3	1	4	0
(Russia) Bogdan Trineev	4	3	1	4	2

GP = Games played; G = Goals; A = Assists; Pts = Points; +/− = P Plus–minus; PIM = Penalties In Minutes
Source: hlinkagretzkycup.cz

=== Final ranking ===
Pos	Team	Pld	W	OTW	OTL	L	GF	GA	GD	Pts
1	Russia	5	4	1	0	0	18	6	+12	14
2	Canada	5	3	1	0	1	26	6	+20	11
3	Sweden	5	2	1	1	1	15	13	+2	9
4	Finland	5	2	0	0	3	13	16	−3	6
5	Czech Republic (H)	4	0	2	0	2	10	18	−8	4
6	United States	4	0	1	2	1	13	18	−5	4
7	Slovakia (H)	4	1	0	2	1	13	14	−1	5
8	Switzerland	4	0	0	1	3	8	25	−17	1

Updated to match(es) played on 10 August 2019. Source:
Rules for classification: 1) position in the group; 2) number of points; 3) goal difference; 4) goals scored; 5) seeding before tournament.
(H) Host

== Broadcasting ==
=== Canada ===
- TSN (online streaming available)
- Sportsnet

=== Russia ===
- http://www.fhr.ru (online video streaming)
