= 2012 Canada–Russia Challenge =

2012 junior ice hockey series between Canada and Russia

Tournament details
- Venues: 2 (in 2 host cities)
- Dates: August 9–14, 2012
- Teams: 2

Final positions
- Champions: Canada
- Runners-up: Russia

Tournament statistics
- Games played: 4

The 2012 Canada–Russia Challenge was a four-game international ice hockey tournament between Canadian and Russian junior teams, held in Canada and Russia on August 9–14, 2012, commemorating the 40th anniversary of the 1972 Summit Series, as well as honouring the memory of the 2011 Lokomotiv Yaroslavl plane crash.

== Games ==
Date	City	Away team	Home team	Score
August 9	Yaroslavl, Russia	Canada	Russia	3–2
August 10	Yaroslavl, Russia	Canada	Russia	3–6
August 13	Halifax, Canada	Russia	Canada	6–5
August 14	Halifax, Canada	Russia	Canada	2–4

Being a four-game series with each team winning twice, a tie-breaking overtime was required to determine the series winner. Canada's Ryan Strome scored at 3:20 of the 20-minute sudden death period to win the series for Canada.

== Statistics ==
Name	Nationality	Goals	Assists	Points
Ty Rattie	Canada	3	2	5
Kirill Kapustin	Russia	3	2	5
Jonathan Huberdeau	Canada	2	3	5
Ryan Murphy	Canada	1	4	5
Andrei Sigarev	Russia	3	1	4
Ryan Strome	Canada	2	2	4
Nail Yakupov	Russia	1	3	4
Morgan Rielly	Canada	1	3	4
Mark Scheifele	Canada	0	4	4
Sean Monahan	Canada	2	1	3

Name	Nationality	GP	SA	GA	SVPT	GAA
Malcolm Subban	Canada	2	49	4	91.84%	2
Andrei Vasilevski	Russia	2	73	7	90.41%	3.5
Andrei Makarov	Russia	2	79	8	89.87%	4
Maxime Lagacé	Canada	1	35	5	85.71%	5
Laurent Brossoit	Canada	1	27	6	77.78%	6

- Includes Ryan Stromes overtime goal for players, but does not count against Andrei Vasilevski because of the lack of information regarding total overtime shots.
