= Leo Lööf =

Swedish ice hockey player (born 2002)

- Born: 25 April 2002 (age 24) Karlstad, Sweden
- Height: 6 ft 1 in (185 cm)
- Weight: 179 lb (81 kg; 12 st 11 lb)
- Position: Defence
- Shoots: Left
- Liiga team Former teams: Ilves; Färjestad BK; Springfield Thunderbirds
- NHL draft: 88th overall, 2020; St. Louis Blues
- Playing career: 2020–present

Leo Lööf (born 25 April 2002) is a Swedish professional ice hockey defenceman currently playing for Ilves in the Finnish Liiga. He previously played for Färjestad BK of the Swedish Hockey League (SHL).

== Playing career ==
Lööf made his professional debut during the 2019–20 season where he appeared in one game for Färjestad BK of the SHL. He was drafted in the third round, 88th overall, by the St. Louis Blues in the 2020 NHL entry draft.

On 28 April 2023, Lööf was signed to a three-year, entry-level contract with the St. Louis Blues.

At the conclusion of his contract with the Blues, Lööf was not extended as a restricted free agent with the Blues, returning to former Finnish club, Liiga, on a two-year contract on 26 May 2026.

== International play ==
Medal record

Representing Sweden

Ice hockey

World Junior Championships
| Bronze medal – third place | 2022 Canada | |

Lööf represented Sweden at the 2022 World Junior Ice Hockey Championships and won a bronze medal.

== Career statistics ==
=== Regular season and playoffs ===
| | | | Regular season | | | | | Playoffs |
| Season | Team | League | GP | G | A | Pts | PIM | GP | G | A | Pts | PIM |
|---|---|---|---|---|---|---|---|---|---|---|---|---|
| 2018–19 | Färjestad BK | J20 | 11 | 1 | 1 | 2 | 8 | — | — | — | — | — |
| 2019–20 | Färjestad BK | J20 | 43 | 2 | 13 | 15 | 93 | — | — | — | — | — |
| 2019–20 | Färjestad BK | SHL | 1 | 0 | 0 | 0 | 0 | — | — | — | — | — |
| 2020–21 | Färjestad BK | SHL | 9 | 0 | 0 | 0 | 2 | — | — | — | — | — |
| 2020–21 | Linden Hockey | Div.1 | 19 | 3 | 12 | 15 | 16 | 1 | 0 | 0 | 0 | 0 |
| 2021–22 | Ilves | Liiga | 48 | 4 | 6 | 10 | 30 | 10 | 0 | 2 | 2 | 4 |
| 2022–23 | Ilves | Liiga | 55 | 4 | 12 | 16 | 28 | 12 | 1 | 2 | 3 | 6 |
| 2023–24 | Springfield Thunderbirds | AHL | 58 | 0 | 7 | 7 | 27 | — | — | — | — | — |
| 2024–25 | Springfield Thunderbirds | AHL | 63 | 0 | 17 | 17 | 66 | 3 | 0 | 0 | 0 | 2 |
| 2025–26 | Springfield Thunderbirds | AHL | 47 | 2 | 4 | 6 | 29 | — | — | — | — | — |
| SHL totals | | | 10 | 0 | 0 | 0 | 2 | — | — | — | — | — |
| Liiga totals | | | 103 | 8 | 18 | 26 | 58 | 22 | 1 | 4 | 5 | 10 |

=== International ===
| Year | Team | Event | Result | GP | G | A | Pts | PIM |
|---|---|---|---|---|---|---|---|---|
| 2019 | Sweden | HG18 | 3rd place, bronze medalist(s) | 5 | 0 | 2 | 2 | 4 |
| 2022 | Sweden | WJC | 3rd place, bronze medalist(s) | 6 | 0 | 0 | 0 | 4 |
| Junior totals | | | | 11 | 0 | 2 | 2 | 8 |
