= Josh Morrissey =

Canadian ice hockey player (born 1995)

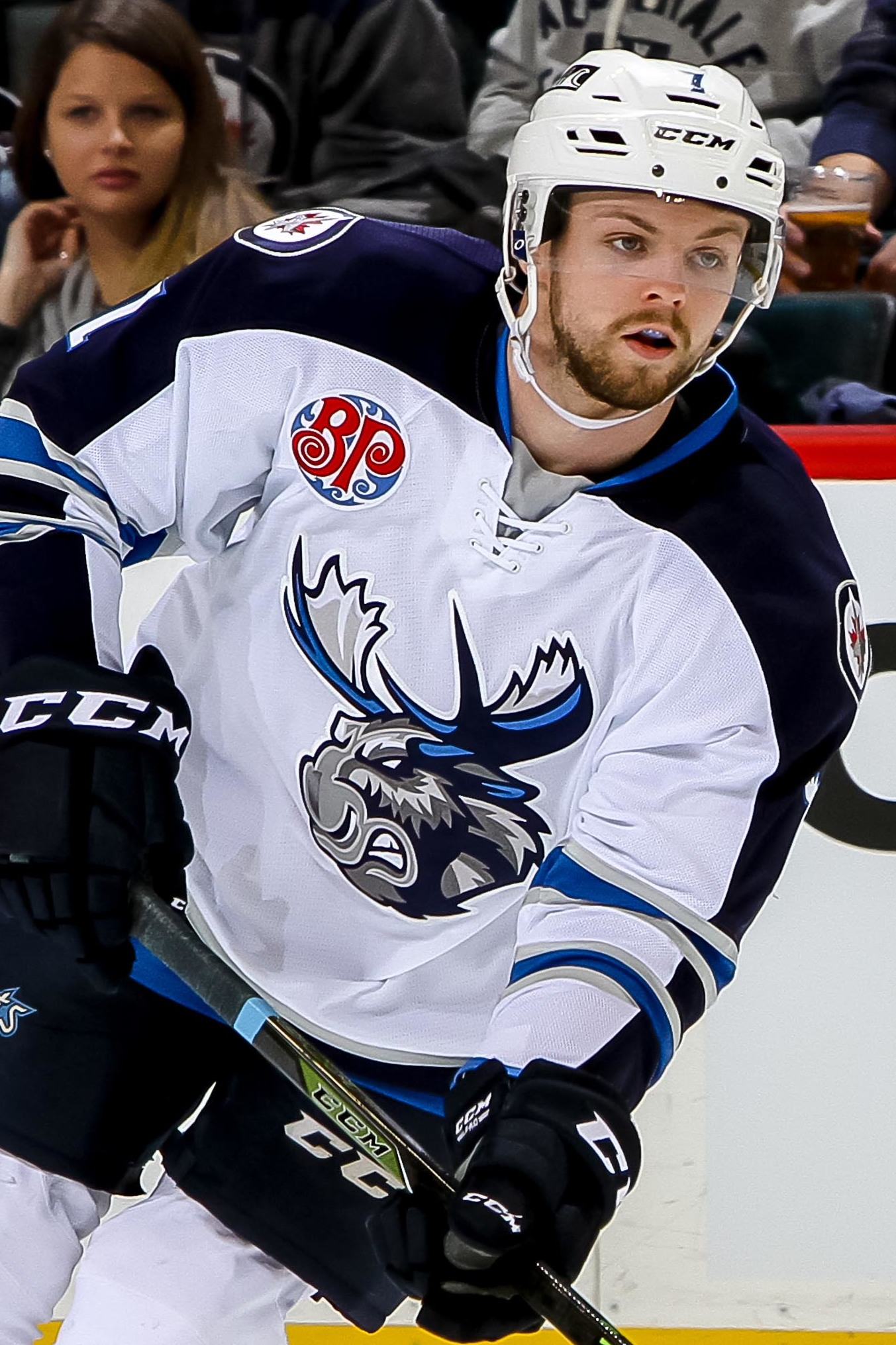
- Morrissey with the Manitoba Moose in 2016
- Born: March 28, 1995 (age 31) Calgary, Alberta, Canada
- Height: 6 ft 0 in (183 cm)
- Weight: 194 lb (88 kg; 13 st 12 lb)
- Position: Defence
- Shoots: Left
- NHL team: Winnipeg Jets
- National team: Canada
- NHL draft: 13th overall, 2013; Winnipeg Jets
- Playing career: 2014–present

Joshua Morrissey (born March 28, 1995) is a Canadian professional ice hockey player who is a defenceman and alternate captain for the Winnipeg Jets of the National Hockey League (NHL). He was selected by the Jets in the first round, 13th overall, of the 2013 NHL entry draft.

== Playing career ==
=== Amateur ===
As a youth, Morrissey played in the 2007 Quebec International Pee-Wee Hockey Tournament with the Calgary Flames minor ice hockey team. He was selected by the Western Hockey League (WHL)'s Prince Albert Raiders in the first round, sixth overall, of the 2010 WHL Bantam Draft after skating for Calgary Royals Gold, and being named the top bantam defenceman in southern Alberta. Morrissey made his WHL debut in 2010 skating in five games with Prince Albert, spending most of the season with the Calgary Royals midget AAA team, and competing for Team Alberta during the 2011 Canada Winter Games in Halifax, Nova Scotia. He helped lead Alberta to a bronze medal.

In the 2012–13 season, Morrissey led Prince Albert defenceman in points, scoring 15 goals and 32 assists to go with a +14 plus-minus rating and 91 penalty minutes. The Raiders finished with a winning record for the first time since 2003–04.

In the subsequent off-season, Morrissey was drafted by the Winnipeg Jets in the first round, 13th overall, of the 2013 NHL entry draft. Prior to the beginning of the 2013–14 season, Morrissey was named captain of the Raiders. On October 3, 2013, the Winnipeg Jets signed him to three-year, two-way contract, although he returned to Prince Albert for the season. He finished as the second-leading scorer in the WHL during the 2013–14 season, recording 28 goals and 45 assists (73 points) in 59 regular season games, along with a +6 plus-minus rating and 59 penalty minutes. The Raiders were fourth in the East Division before being swept by the eventual 2014 Memorial Cup champions, the Edmonton Oil Kings, in the first round.

On December 10, 2014, during the 2014–15 season, Morrissey was traded to the Kelowna Rockets. He would help lead the Rockets to the WHL championship as well as to the final of the 2015 Memorial Cup, which they lost to the Oshawa Generals.

=== Professional ===
Morrissey was called up to Winnipeg's American Hockey League (AHL) affiliate, the St. John's IceCaps, during the 2013–14 season, playing eight regular season games as well as 20 games in the 2014 Calder Cup playoffs. The Jets assigned him to the Manitoba Moose (their new AHL affiliate) the following season, although they briefly called him up late in the season to make his NHL debut in a home game against the Montreal Canadiens on March 5, 2016.

Morrissey scored his first career NHL goal on November 15, 2016, in a 4–0 win over the Chicago Blackhawks. He finished his first full season with the Jets with 6 goals and 20 points in 82 games. During his second season with the Jets, Morrissey recorded 26 points in 81 games to help the Jets qualify for the 2018 Stanley Cup playoffs. During the first round, Morrissey was suspended one game for cross-checking Eric Staal of the Minnesota Wild.

On September 12, 2019, Morrissey signed an 8-year, $50 million extension with the Jets, carrying an annual average of $6.25 million. Later, on October 1, 2019, just before the start of the 2019–20 NHL season Morrissey was named an alternate captain of the Jets.

==== 2025-26 Season ====
Morrisey became the Jets' all-time leader in scoring by a defenceman following a March 7 game against the Vancouver Canucks, passing Dustin Byfuglien.

== International play ==
Medal record

Ice hockey

Representing Canada

Olympic Games
| Silver medal – second place | 2026 Milano Cortina | |

World Championships
| Silver medal – second place | 2017 Germany/France | |

4 Nations Face-Off
| Winner | 2025 Canada/United States | |

IIHF World U20 Championship
| Gold medal – first place | 2015 Canada | |

IIHF World U18 Championship
| Gold medal – first place | 2013 Russia | |
| Bronze medal – third place | 2012 Czech Republic | |

Morrissey has represented Canada in several international tournaments, including the IIHF World U18 Championships, the Ivan Hlinka Memorial Tournament and the IIHF World U20 Championships. Morrissey was instrumental in helping the under-18 team win gold at the 2013 World U18 Championships, as well as the under-20 team at the 2015 World Junior Championships. He was named to the 2015 World Junior All-Star First Team, finishing with four points and a +9 plus-minus rating.

Following the 2016–17 season, Morrissey was invited to make his senior national team debut at the 2017 IIHF World Championship. Canada won the silver medal. Eight years later, with the NHL hosting the 2025 4 Nations Face-Off, the first international tournament with full league participation since 2016, Morrissey rejoined the Canadian national team. He participated in all three games in the round robin phase, but due to illness was unable to play in the final against the United States.

The men's tournament at the 2026 Winter Olympics was the first to feature NHL participation since 2014. On December 31, 2025, Morrissey was named to Canada's roster. Having missed the victory at the 4 Nations Face-Off, he described "a hunger level for me to obviously have a great tournament and push to win a gold medal, and hope to be a part of that celebration that I wasn’t able to be a part of last year." Morrissey exited Canada's opening game against Czechia due to injury, and was unable to play for the remainder of the tournament, where Canada reached the final but was defeated by the United States, thereby earning the silver medal.

== Career statistics ==
=== Regular season and playoffs ===
| | | | Regular season | | | | | Playoffs |
| Season | Team | League | GP | G | A | Pts | PIM | GP | G | A | Pts | PIM |
|---|---|---|---|---|---|---|---|---|---|---|---|---|
| 2010–11 | Prince Albert Raiders | WHL | 5 | 0 | 0 | 0 | 4 | — | — | — | — | — |
| 2011–12 | Prince Albert Raiders | WHL | 68 | 10 | 28 | 38 | 60 | — | — | — | — | — |
| 2012–13 | Prince Albert Raiders | WHL | 70 | 15 | 32 | 47 | 91 | 4 | 0 | 1 | 1 | 9 |
| 2013–14 | Prince Albert Raiders | WHL | 59 | 28 | 45 | 73 | 59 | 4 | 1 | 2 | 3 | 6 |
| 2013–14 | St. John's IceCaps | AHL | 8 | 0 | 1 | 1 | 2 | 20 | 2 | 7 | 9 | 20 |
| 2014–15 | Prince Albert Raiders | WHL | 27 | 7 | 14 | 21 | 28 | — | — | — | — | — |
| 2014–15 | Kelowna Rockets | WHL | 20 | 6 | 11 | 17 | 34 | 13 | 2 | 12 | 14 | 24 |
| 2015–16 | Manitoba Moose | AHL | 57 | 3 | 19 | 22 | 47 | — | — | — | — | — |
| 2015–16 | Winnipeg Jets | NHL | 1 | 0 | 0 | 0 | 0 | — | — | — | — | — |
| 2016–17 | Winnipeg Jets | NHL | 82 | 6 | 14 | 20 | 38 | — | — | — | — | — |
| 2017–18 | Winnipeg Jets | NHL | 81 | 7 | 19 | 26 | 47 | 16 | 1 | 1 | 2 | 6 |
| 2018–19 | Winnipeg Jets | NHL | 59 | 6 | 25 | 31 | 14 | 6 | 0 | 1 | 1 | 0 |
| 2019–20 | Winnipeg Jets | NHL | 65 | 5 | 26 | 31 | 24 | 4 | 0 | 1 | 1 | 4 |
| 2020–21 | Winnipeg Jets | NHL | 56 | 4 | 17 | 21 | 25 | 8 | 1 | 4 | 5 | 6 |
| 2021–22 | Winnipeg Jets | NHL | 79 | 12 | 25 | 37 | 66 | — | — | — | — | — |
| 2022–23 | Winnipeg Jets | NHL | 78 | 16 | 60 | 76 | 41 | 3 | 0 | 1 | 1 | 0 |
| 2023–24 | Winnipeg Jets | NHL | 81 | 10 | 59 | 69 | 44 | 5 | 3 | 1 | 4 | 2 |
| 2024–25 | Winnipeg Jets | NHL | 80 | 14 | 48 | 62 | 22 | 12 | 0 | 6 | 6 | 8 |
| 2025–26 | Winnipeg Jets | NHL | 77 | 14 | 41 | 55 | 30 | — | — | — | — | — |
| NHL totals | | | 739 | 94 | 334 | 428 | 351 | 54 | 5 | 15 | 20 | 26 |

=== International ===
| Year | Team | Event | Result | GP | G | A | Pts | PIM |
|---|---|---|---|---|---|---|---|---|
| 2012 | Canada Pacific | U17 | 5th | 5 | 1 | 1 | 2 | 10 |
| 2012 | Canada | U18 | 3rd place, bronze medalist(s) | 7 | 0 | 3 | 3 | 22 |
| 2012 | Canada | IH18 | 1st place, gold medalist(s) | 5 | 1 | 8 | 9 | 14 |
| 2013 | Canada | U18 | 1st place, gold medalist(s) | 7 | 3 | 4 | 7 | 4 |
| 2014 | Canada | WJC | 4th | 7 | 1 | 2 | 3 | 4 |
| 2015 | Canada | WJC | 1st place, gold medalist(s) | 7 | 1 | 3 | 4 | 0 |
| 2017 | Canada | WC | 2nd place, silver medalist(s) | 10 | 0 | 1 | 1 | 6 |
| 2025 | Canada | 4NF | 1st place, gold medalist(s) | 3 | 0 | 0 | 0 | 2 |
| 2026 | Canada | OG | 2nd place, silver medalist(s) | 1 | 0 | 0 | 0 | 0 |
| Junior totals | | | | 38 | 7 | 21 | 28 | 54 |
| Senior totals | | | | 14 | 0 | 1 | 1 | 8 |

== Awards and honours ==
| Honour | Year | Ref |
WHL
| WHL First All-Star Team (East) | 2014 | |
NHL
| NHL All-Star Game | 2023 | |
International
| IIHF World U20 Championship All-Tournament Team | 2015 | |

== Personal life ==
Morrissey is very involved with local charity The Dream Factory, being named as an ambassador for the organization. The Dream Factory hosts the Josh Morrissey Classic, an annual golf tournament in his name which has been running for nine years.

On April 21st 2024, Morrissey and long-time friend Bobby Mottola opened a restaurant called The 44 as co-owners. It is an eatery specializing in "fan-favourite sandwiches".

In 2026, he and his wife Margot welcomed a baby.

Awards and achievements
| Preceded by Jacob Trouba | Winnipeg Jets first-round draft pick 2013 | Succeeded by Nikolaj Ehlers |
