= Daniel Torgersson =

Swedish ice hockey player (born 2002)

- Born: 26 January 2002 (age 24) Hönö, Sweden
- Height: 6 ft 3 in (191 cm)
- Weight: 205 lb (93 kg; 14 st 9 lb)
- Position: Winger
- Shoots: Left
- Liiga team Former teams: JYP Jyväskylä; Frölunda HC; Manitoba Moose
- NHL draft: 40th overall, 2020; Winnipeg Jets
- Playing career: 2020–present

Daniel Torgersson is a Swedish professional ice hockey winger currently playing with JYP Jyväskylä of the Finnish Liiga.

== Playing career ==
Torgersson made his Swedish Hockey League (SHL) debut with Frölunda HC during the 2019–20 season. Torgersson was drafted by the Winnipeg Jets in the second round of the 2020 NHL entry draft with the 40th overall pick.

On 10 April 2022, Torgersson was signed to a three-year, entry-level contract with draft club, the Winnipeg Jets. He immediately joined AHL affiliate, the Manitoba Moose for the remainder of the 2021–22 season.

In the 2024–25 season, his fourth with the Manitoba Moose, Torgersson was scoreless through 12 appearances and was limited as a healthy scratch. On 28 December 2024, Torgersson mutually opted to terminate the remainder of his contract with the Winnipeg Jets after he cleared unconditional waivers. In leaving North America, Torgersson as a free agent was signed to a two-year contract with Finnish Liiga club, JYP Jyväskylä, on 30 December 2024.

Medal record

Representing Sweden

Ice hockey

World Junior Championships
Bronze medal – third place	2022 Canada	

== Career statistics ==
=== Regular season and playoffs ===
			Regular season					Playoffs
Season	Team	League	GP	G	A	Pts	PIM	GP	G	A	Pts	PIM
2018–19	Frölunda HC	J20	18	1	3	4	4	3	0	0	0	0
2019–20	Frölunda HC	J20	39	26	18	44	24	—	—	—	—	—
2019–20	Frölunda HC	SHL	6	0	0	0	0	—	—	—	—	—
2020–21	Frölunda HC	J20	10	4	5	9	4	—	—	—	—	—
2020–21	Frölunda HC	SHL	2	0	0	0	0	—	—	—	—	—
2021–22	Frölunda HC	SHL	1	0	0	0	0	—	—	—	—	—
2021–22	AIK	Allsv	40	7	10	17	14	2	0	0	0	0
2021–22	Frölunda HC	J20	—	—	—	—	—	3	1	2	3	0
2021–22	Manitoba Moose	AHL	4	2	1	3	4	—	—	—	—	—
2022–23	Manitoba Moose	AHL	69	11	9	20	10	5	1	0	1	0
2023–24	Manitoba Moose	AHL	52	1	8	9	12	2	1	0	1	0
2024–25	Manitoba Moose	AHL	12	0	0	0	8	—	—	—	—	—
2024–25	JYP	Liiga	26	8	15	23	22	—	—	—	—	—
2025–26	JYP	Liiga	60	10	25	35	16	—	—	—	—	—
SHL totals			9	0	0	0	0	—	—	—	—	—
Liiga totals			86	18	40	58	38	—	—	—	—	—

=== International ===
Year	Team	Event	Result	GP	G	A	Pts	PIM
2018	Sweden	U17	3rd place, bronze medalist(s)	6	0	1	1	0
2019	Sweden	HG18	3rd place, bronze medalist(s)	5	2	1	3	2
2022	Sweden	WJC	3rd place, bronze medalist(s)	7	2	0	2	8
Junior totals				18	4	2	6	10
