= Mark Pysyk =

Canadian ice hockey player (born 1992)

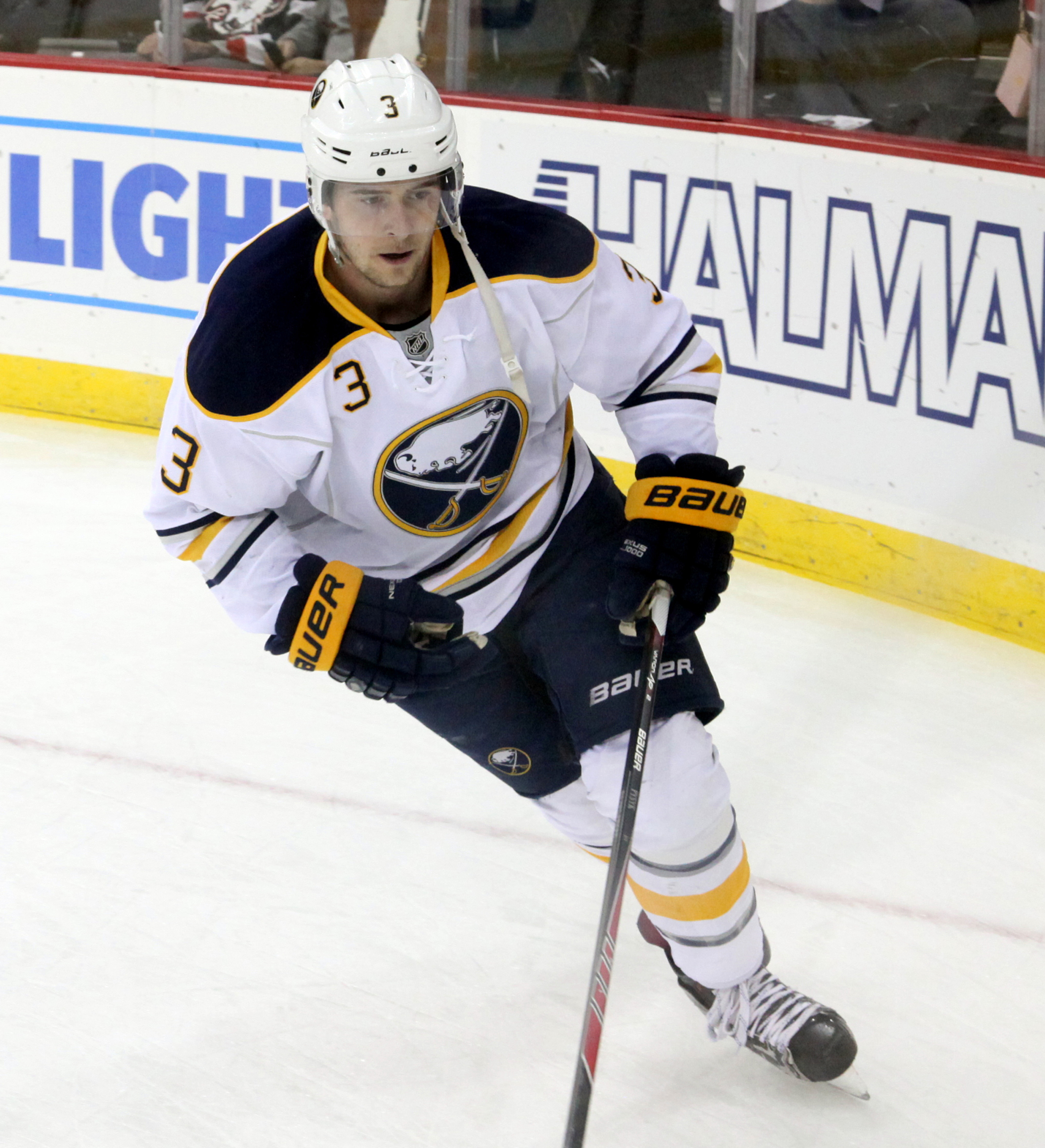
- Pysyk with the Buffalo Sabres in 2016
- Born: January 11, 1992 (age 34) Edmonton, Alberta, Canada
- Height: 6 ft 1 in (185 cm)
- Weight: 201 lb (91 kg; 14 st 5 lb)
- Position: Defence / right wing
- Shoots: Right
- ELH team Former teams: HC Sparta Praha; Buffalo Sabres; Florida Panthers; Dallas Stars; SaiPa
- NHL draft: 23rd overall, 2010; Buffalo Sabres
- Playing career: 2012–present

Mark Alexander Terrance Pysyk (/ˈpɛsɪk/ PESS-ik; born January 11, 1992) is a Canadian professional ice hockey player who currently plays for HC Sparta Praha in the Czech Extraliga (ELH). Pysyk was originally selected in the first round, 23rd overall, in the 2010 NHL entry draft by the Buffalo Sabres. He has also previously played for the Florida Panthers and the Dallas Stars.

== Playing career ==
=== Amateur ===
While competing in the Alberta Major Bantam Hockey League (AMBHL) for the 2006–07 season with the Strathcona Warriors, Pysyk recorded 15 goals and 49 points in 33 games and was the co-recipient of the league's top defenceman award. At the age of 15, Pysyk became the first-ever draft pick of the current incarnation of the Edmonton Oil Kings when he was selected third overall in the 2007 Western Hockey League (WHL) Bantam Draft. Due to his age, he would only be able to play with the team as an affiliate player for the 2007–08 season. He began the season with the AMBHL but was told by Oil Kings head coach Steve Pleau he would make his WHL debut after the Christmas break. Pysyk subsequently made his debut on December 28, 2007, against the Red Deer Rebels. In his second game since being called up from Midget AAA, Pysyk was working with the power play unit and recorded his first WHL assist.

Pysyk recorded his first career WHL goal on March 8, 2008, in a 4–1 loss to the Brandon Wheat Kings, helping the team maintain their 20–37-4 record. After concluding his first full season with the Oil Kings, Pysyk was the recipient of two team end-of-year awards: Rookie of the Year and Defenceman of the Year.

Pysyk returned to the Oil Kings for the 2009–10 season, where the team had the second-fewest points in the league. He played 48 games before being sidelined with a broken foot but still ended the season eighth on the team in scoring. His efforts were recognized by Oil Kings GM Bob Green, who said: "He carried our team on his back a lot of nights this winter, and the fact that he played on a broken foot for a couple of games before he was forced to end his season early shows how much character he's developed." At the end of the season, Pysyk was ranked seventh among North American skaters for the 2010 NHL entry draft by the NHL Central Scouting Bureau. He was eventually selected in the first round, 23rd overall, by the Buffalo Sabres. Following his draft, Sabres' director of amateur scouting proposed Pysyk would need three years before making his NHL debut due to his small stature and light weight. After being returned to his junior team by the Sabres after training camp, Pysyk was named the captain of the Oil Kings on September 28, 2010.

On May 13, 2012, Pysyk, along with the rest of the Edmonton Oil Kings, won game 7 of the WHL Finals, against the Portland Winter Hawks with a score of 4–1, to win the Ed Chynoweth Cup. They went on to the Memorial Cup in Shawinigan Quebec, and came in fourth.

=== Professional ===
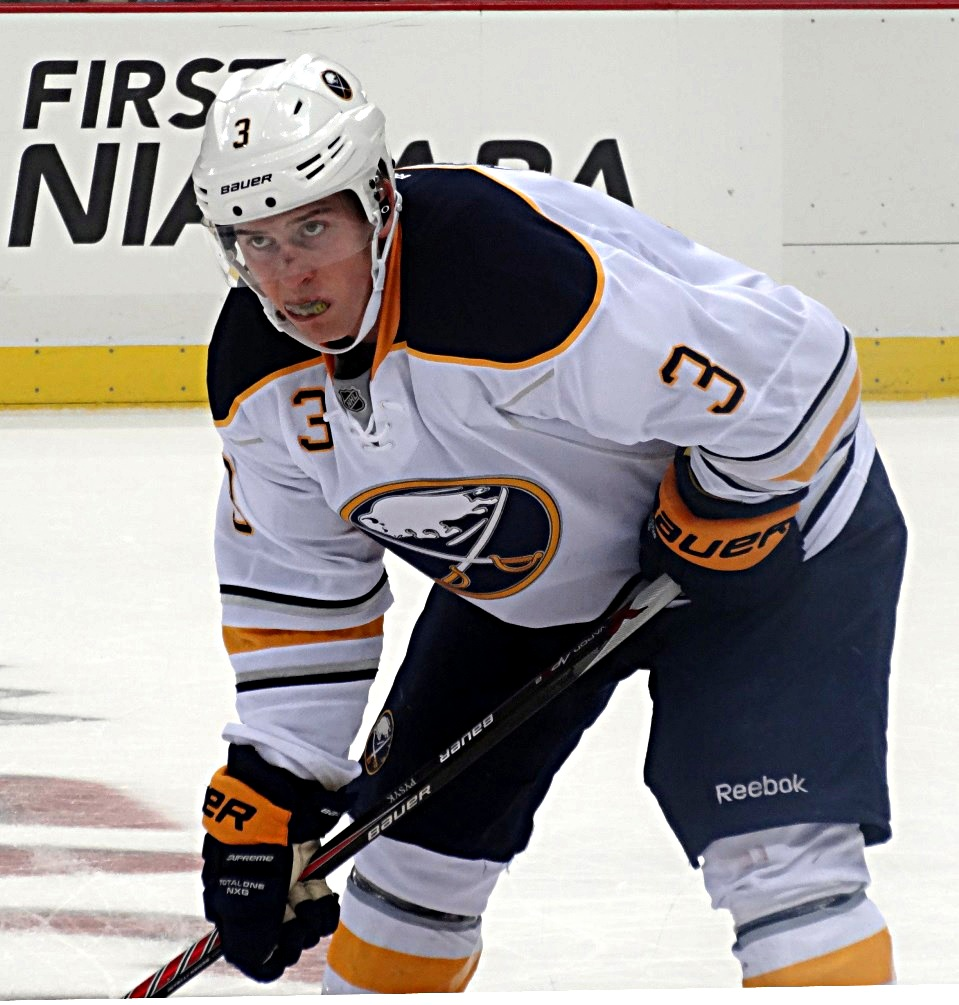
Pysyk with the Sabres in October 2013

In his debut professional season in 2012–13, he marked his first professional game by scoring a goal with the Sabres' American Hockey League (AHL) affiliate, the Rochester Americans, on October 12, 2012. After 57 games with the Americans, Pysyk received his first NHL call-up by Buffalo midway into the shortened season. He played his first NHL game on March 17, 2013 against the Washington Capitals. Pysyk scored his first NHL goal against Henrik Lundqvist in an 8–4 loss to the New York Rangers on April 19, 2013. Pysyk spent the following two seasons split between Buffalo and Rochester. Buffalo re-signed Pysyk to a two-year contract on July 14, 2015.

Again in the 2015–16 season, Pysyk had trouble establishing himself at the NHL level, suffering a lower body injury that sidelined him for 22 games. He split the season between Buffalo and Rochester. On June 25, 2016, Pysyk was traded, along with picks 38 and 89 in the 2016 NHL entry draft to the Florida Panthers in exchange for pick 33 in the 2016 draft and defenceman Dmitri Kulikov. In the 2019–20 season, Pysyk began the season on the blueline often in a bottom pairing role. With the depth on the Panthers defense, he was also used at the right wing at times throughout the season and responded offensively scoring his first NHL hat trick, tallying three goals on three shots to rally the Panthers to victory from a 3–1 deficit on February 3, 2020. He set career highs by posting nine goals and 18 points in 58 regular season games played for Florida.

On October 11, 2020, Pysyk signed a one-year, $750,000 contract with the Dallas Stars. In the pandemic-delayed 2020–21 season, Pysyk played on the third pairing with either Andrej Sekera and Joel Hanley. He recorded just three goals and four points through 36 games in the shortened season.

Leaving the Stars after one season, Pysyk returned to his original club, the Buffalo Sabres, agreeing to a one-year, $900,000 contract on July 28, 2021. During the 2021–22 season he recorded three goals and nine assists in 68 games for the Sabres.

On July 14, 2022, Pysyk signed a one-year, $850,000 contract with the Detroit Red Wings. Shortly after he was acquired by the Red Wings, the club announced that he would miss the beginning of the 2022–23 season after he suffered an Achilles tendon tear and underwent surgery with a recovery timetable of four to six months. Pysyk was unable to make a competitive return throughout the season, failing to make his debut with the Red Wings.

Pysyk left the Red Wings at the completion of his contract and was later signed as a free agent to a professional tryout deal (PTO) with the Pittsburgh Penguins on August 30, 2023. After attending training camp, Pysyk was released from his tryout with Pittsburgh, remaining unsigned into the 2023–24 season. He was later signed a PTO with Pittsburgh's AHL affiliate, Wilkes-Barre/Scranton Penguins, on November 2. He went scoreless in eight appearances with the Penguins before he was released from his tryout on November 28.

On December 2, 2023, Psysk was signed to a one-year, two-way contract by the Calgary Flames. He was later placed on waivers, and on December 3, Pysyk was assigned to the Flames' AHL affiliate, the Calgary Wranglers. He remained with the Wranglers for the completion of the 2023–24 season, posting 4 assists through 29 regular season games. The Wranglers made the 2023 Calder Cup playoffs and he appeared in six games for the Wranglers.

As a free agent from the Flames, Pysyk for the second consecutive year went un-signed over the off-season before he accepted an invitation to attend the Anaheim Ducks training camp for the 2024–25 season on a professional tryout on September 12, 2024. However, he was released from his tryout on October 4.

On November 14, 2024, Pysyk signed as a free agent to play the remainder of the 2024–25 season with SaiPa in the Finnish Liiga.

After helping SaiPa reach the Liiga finals, Pysyk signed a one-year contract with HC Sparta Prague of the Czech Extraliga on May 22, 2025.

== International play ==
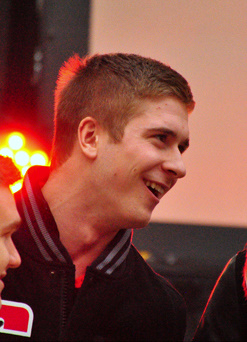
- Pysyk as a member of Team Canada at the 2012 World Junior Championships

Medal record

Representing Canada

Ice hockey

World Junior Championships
Bronze medal – third place	2012 Canada	

Ivan Hlinka Memorial Tournament
Gold medal – first place	2009 Slovakia	

Pysyk played Team Canada at the 2009 Ivan Hlinka Memorial Tournament. He was invited to take part in Canada's 2011 National Junior Team selection camp, but did not make the final roster. The following year, he was named to the team for the 2012 World Junior Championships, held in Alberta. Canada won bronze at the tournament.

== Personal life ==
Pysyk was born on January 11, 1992, to Ukrainian parents Sherry and Terry. His mother is a nurse at University of Alberta Hospitals and his father is a vice-principal. Born in Edmonton, Pysyk and his family moved to Sherwood Park while he was in the third grade. As such, Pysyk played his minor career in the Sherwood Park program.

== Career statistics ==
=== Regular season and playoffs ===
			Regular season					Playoffs
Season	Team	League	GP	G	A	Pts	PIM	GP	G	A	Pts	PIM
2007–08	Sherwood Park Kings AAA	AMHL	34	10	10	20	60	2	1	0	1	16
2007–08	Sherwood Park Crusaders	AJHL	1	0	1	1	0	—	—	—	—	—
2007–08	Edmonton Oil Kings	WHL	14	1	2	3	8	—	—	—	—	—
2008–09	Edmonton Oil Kings	WHL	61	5	15	20	27	4	0	0	0	2
2009–10	Edmonton Oil Kings	WHL	48	7	17	24	47	—	—	—	—	—
2010–11	Edmonton Oil Kings	WHL	63	6	34	40	88	4	0	0	0	6
2011–12	Edmonton Oil Kings	WHL	57	6	32	38	83	20	3	8	11	16
2012–13	Rochester Americans	AHL	57	4	14	18	20	3	0	0	0	2
2012–13	Buffalo Sabres	NHL	19	1	4	5	0	—	—	—	—	—
2013–14	Buffalo Sabres	NHL	44	1	6	7	16	—	—	—	—	—
2013–14	Rochester Americans	AHL	31	1	11	12	28	5	0	0	0	14
2014–15	Rochester Americans	AHL	54	3	14	17	32	—	—	—	—	—
2014–15	Buffalo Sabres	NHL	7	2	1	3	2	—	—	—	—	—
2015–16	Buffalo Sabres	NHL	55	1	10	11	32	—	—	—	—	—
2015–16	Rochester Americans	AHL	3	0	1	1	2	—	—	—	—	—
2016–17	Florida Panthers	NHL	82	4	13	17	10	—	—	—	—	—
2017–18	Florida Panthers	NHL	82	3	13	16	20	—	—	—	—	—
2018–19	Florida Panthers	NHL	70	1	10	11	26	—	—	—	—	—
2019–20	Florida Panthers	NHL	58	9	9	18	20	4	0	0	0	0
2020–21	Dallas Stars	NHL	36	3	1	4	20	—	—	—	—	—
2021–22	Buffalo Sabres	NHL	68	3	9	12	16	—	—	—	—	—
2023–24	Wilkes-Barre/Scranton Penguins	AHL	8	0	0	0	4	—	—	—	—	—
2023–24	Calgary Wranglers	AHL	29	0	4	4	10	6	0	0	0	0
2024–25	SaiPa	Liiga	36	2	7	9	12	20	3	5	8	8
2025–26	HC Sparta Praha	ELH	50	6	15	21	28	19	1	3	4	10
NHL totals			521	28	76	104	162	4	0	0	0	0

=== International ===
Year	Team	Event	Result	GP	G	A	Pts	PIM
2009	Canada Pacific	U17	2nd place, silver medalist(s)	6	1	3	4	6
2009	Canada	IH18	1st place, gold medalist(s)	4	0	2	2	2
2012	Canada	WJC	3rd place, bronze medalist(s)	6	0	0	0	2
Junior totals				16	1	5	6	10

Awards and achievements
Preceded by Zack Kassian	Buffalo Sabres first-round draft pick 2010	Succeeded by Joel Armia
