= Vladislav Namestnikov =

Russian ice hockey player (born 1992)

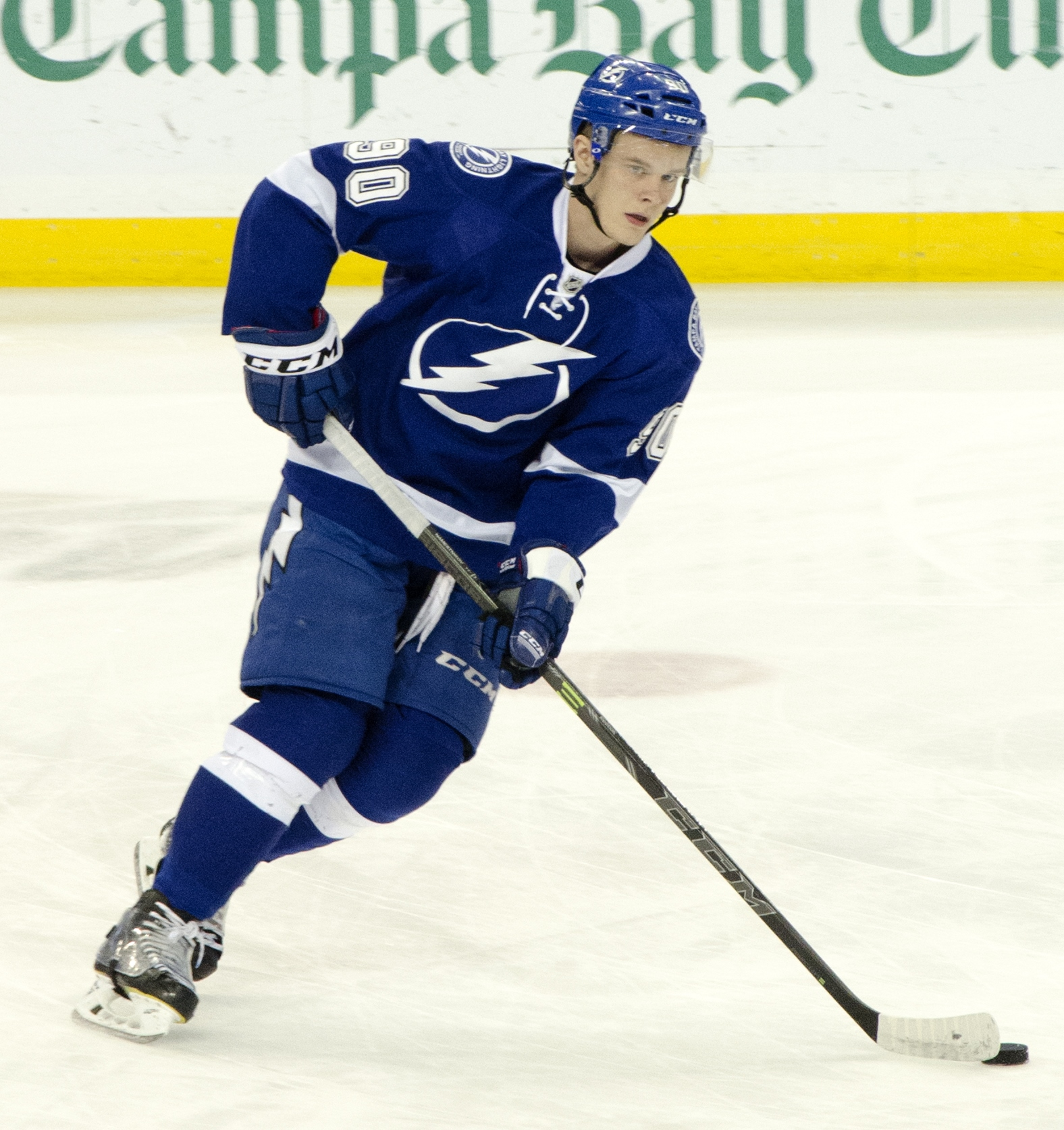
- Namestnikov with the Tampa Bay Lightning in March 2015
- Born: 22 November 1992 (age 34) Voskresensk, Russia
- Height: 5 ft 11 in (180 cm)
- Weight: 181 lb (82 kg; 12 st 13 lb)
- Position: Centre
- Shoots: Left
- NHL team Former teams: Winnipeg Jets; Tampa Bay Lightning; New York Rangers; Ottawa Senators; Colorado Avalanche; Detroit Red Wings; Dallas Stars
- National team: Russia
- NHL draft: 27th overall, 2011; Tampa Bay Lightning
- Playing career: 2009–present

Vladislav Yevgenievich Namestnikov (Russian: Владислав Евгеньевич Наместников; born 22 November 1992) is a Russian professional ice hockey player who is a centre for the Winnipeg Jets of the National Hockey League (NHL). He was selected 27th overall by the Lightning in the 2011 NHL entry draft, and has previously played in the NHL with the Tampa Bay Lightning, New York Rangers, Ottawa Senators, Colorado Avalanche, Detroit Red Wings and Dallas Stars.

== Playing career ==
=== Junior ===
Namestnikov was selected 20th overall by the London Knights in the 2010 Ontario Hockey League (OHL) entry draft. He was also selected 11th overall in the Kontinental Hockey League (KHL) draft by Torpedo Nizhny Novgorod, but he ultimately chose London after deciding he did not want to play in Russia. Namestnikov scored 68 points in 68 games with the Knights in 2010–11 and was rated one of the top players available in the 2011 NHL entry draft, eventually being selected in the first round by the Tampa Bay Lightning.

On 13 March 2012, the Lightning announced that they had signed Namestnikov to a three-year, entry-level contract. He played in 60 games with the London Knights that season, scoring 22 goals and 70 points. He also appeared in six OHL playoff games in 2011, recording one goal and five points.

=== Professional ===
==== Tampa Bay Lightning ====
On 14 September 2012, the Lightning assigned Namestnikov and 17 other players to the Syracuse Crunch, their American Hockey League (AHL) affiliate, during the 2012–13 NHL lockout. He finished the season playing in the Calder Cup Final, where the Crunch fell to the Grand Rapids Griffins in a 4–2 series defeat.

On 7 February 2014, Tampa Bay recalled Namestnikov from the Crunch, where at the time he was leading the team in assists and points. Namestnikov made his NHL debut on 8 February 2014, skating 11:55 for the Lightning in their 4–2 win over the Detroit Red Wings. On 5 March 2014, Namestnikov was reassigned to the Crunch after failing to register a point in four NHL games. He regained his scoring touch in Syracuse and on 6 January 2015, he represented the Eastern Conference in the AHL All-Star Game.

Namestnikov made Tampa Bay's roster out of training camp to start the 2014–15 season. On 13 October 2014, he picked up his first career NHL point with an assist on a Victor Hedman goal, and soon after scored his first career NHL goal in a 7–1 Tampa victory over the Montreal Canadiens. He scored his first career game-winning goal on 24 October in a game against the Winnipeg Jets. Though he had begun demonstrating that he could contribute offensively at the NHL level, the Lightning reassigned Namestnikov to Syracuse on 3 December 2014. He was recalled to Tampa on 4 March 2015, and the team selected him to their playoff roster.

On 17 July 2015, the Lightning announced the re-signing of Namestnikov to a one-year, two-way contract. He subsequently played in 43 games with the Lightning during the 2014–15 NHL season and posted nine goals and 16 points (9–7–16), all career highs. Namestnikov appeared in 12 Stanley Cup playoff games in 2015, recording one assist. In addition, he played in 34 games with the Syracuse Crunch during the 2014–15 season, registering 14 goals and 35 points.

On 15 January 2016, Namestnikov recorded his first career NHL hat-trick in a 5–4 overtime win over the visiting Pittsburgh Penguins. On 3 May 2016, Namestnikov recorded his first NHL playoff goal, which came in a 5–4 overtime Lightning win over the New York Islanders.

Namestnikov re-signed with the Lightning during the summer of 2016, agreeing to a two-year, $3.875 million deal.

==== New York Rangers ====
On 26 February 2018, the day of the 2017–18 NHL trade deadline, the Lightning sent Namestnikov to the New York Rangers, along with Brett Howden, Libor Hájek and a 2018 and 2019 draft pick, in exchange for Ryan McDonagh and J. T. Miller. The Rangers re-signed Namestnikov to a two-year extension on 1 July 2018.

==== Ottawa Senators ====
Namestnikov began the 2019–20 season with two scoreless games for the Rangers before he was traded to the Ottawa Senators in exchange for Nick Ebert and a fourth-round pick in the 2021 NHL entry draft on 7 October 2019. In his debut with the Senators, he registered an assist in a 6–4 loss to the St. Louis Blues on 11 October 2019. In his second game, Namestnikov collected his first two goals plus an assist against his former club, the Tampa Bay Lightning, helping the Senators claim their first victory of the season in a 4–2 decision on 12 October 2019. In an increased offensive role, Namestnikov collected 13 goals and 25 points in 54 games for the Senators.

==== Colorado Avalanche ====
With the rebuilding Senators falling out of playoff contention, Namestnikov was traded for the second time within the season, dealt to the Colorado Avalanche at the trade deadline in exchange for a 2021 fourth-round draft selection on 24 February 2020.

==== Detroit Red Wings ====
On 11 October 2020, Namestnikov signed a two-year, $4 million dollar contract with the Detroit Red Wings.

==== Dallas Stars ====
On 21 March 2022, Namestnikov was traded by Detroit to the Dallas Stars in exchange for a 2024 fourth-round draft pick.

==== Return to Tampa Bay ====
On 13 July 2022, Namestnikov signed as a free agent to a one-year, $2.5 million contract to return to his original draft club, the Tampa Bay Lightning.

==== Winnipeg Jets ====
On 1 March 2023, he was traded to the San Jose Sharks in exchange for Mikey Eyssimont. However, the Sharks traded him to the Winnipeg Jets two days later in exchange for a fourth-round pick in the 2025 NHL Entry Draft.

On 22 February 2025, the Jets signed Namestnikov to a two-year, $6 million contract extension.

== International play ==
Medal record

Ice hockey

Representing Russia

World Championships
Bronze medal – third place	2017 Germany/France	

World Junior A Challenge
Bronze medal – third place	2009 Summerside	

On 2 March 2016, the Russian Ice Hockey Federation named Namestnikov to its roster for the 2016 World Cup of Hockey. Namestnikov was joined by Lightning teammates Nikita Kucherov, Nikita Nesterov and Andrei Vasilevskiy. The tournament took place from 17 September to 1 October 2016 in Toronto. On 21 May 2017, Namestnikov helped Russia capture a bronze medal when they defeated Finland in the bronze medal game of the 2017 IIHF World Championship.

== Personal life ==
Although born in Voskresensk, Namestnikov moved to the United States when he was eight months old, settling in Michigan, with his family. When he was eight, he returned to Voskresensk in Russia to hone his hockey skills, eventually playing in the Vysshaya Liga with Khimik Voskresensk at age 16.

Namestnikov's father, Evgeny, was a player for the Vancouver Canucks and also played for Torpedo Nizhny Novgorod. Like Vladislav, he also played for the Syracuse Crunch during his playing career. His uncle on his mother's side is Vyacheslav Kozlov, a former NHL star having played in over 1,000 games in the NHL for the Detroit Red Wings, Buffalo Sabres and Atlanta Thrashers. Another uncle, Ivan Novoseltsev, was also a professional hockey player, having played over five seasons in the NHL.

Namestnikov's brother, Max, currently plays for the Bemidji State Beavers of the Central Collegiate Hockey Association.

== Career statistics ==
=== Regular season and playoffs ===
			Regular season					Playoffs
Season	Team	League	GP	G	A	Pts	PIM	GP	G	A	Pts	PIM
2008–09	Khimik–2 Voskresensk	RUS.3	1	0	0	0	0	—	—	—	—	—
2009–10	Khimik Voskresensk	RUS.2	33	12	9	21	18	2	1	0	1	2
2010–11	London Knights	OHL	68	30	39	69	49	6	1	4	5	6
2011–12	London Knights	OHL	63	22	49	71	50	19	4	14	18	20
2012–13	Syracuse Crunch	AHL	44	7	14	21	32	18	2	5	7	10
2013–14	Syracuse Crunch	AHL	56	19	29	48	40	—	—	—	—	—
2013–14	Tampa Bay Lightning	NHL	4	0	0	0	4	—	—	—	—	—
2014–15	Syracuse Crunch	AHL	34	14	21	35	12	—	—	—	—	—
2014–15	Tampa Bay Lightning	NHL	43	9	7	16	13	12	0	1	1	4
2015–16	Tampa Bay Lightning	NHL	80	14	21	35	45	17	1	2	3	0
2016–17	Tampa Bay Lightning	NHL	74	10	18	28	31	—	—	—	—	—
2017–18	Tampa Bay Lightning	NHL	62	20	24	44	35	—	—	—	—	—
2017–18	New York Rangers	NHL	19	2	2	4	10	—	—	—	—	—
2018–19	New York Rangers	NHL	78	11	20	31	44	—	—	—	—	—
2019–20	New York Rangers	NHL	2	0	0	0	2	—	—	—	—	—
2019–20	Ottawa Senators	NHL	54	13	12	25	35	—	—	—	—	—
2019–20	Colorado Avalanche	NHL	9	4	2	6	8	12	4	1	5	4
2020–21	Detroit Red Wings	NHL	53	8	9	17	24	—	—	—	—	—
2021–22	Detroit Red Wings	NHL	60	13	12	25	34	—	—	—	—	—
2021–22	Dallas Stars	NHL	15	3	2	5	11	7	1	1	2	16
2022–23	Tampa Bay Lightning	NHL	57	6	9	15	19	—	—	—	—	—
2022–23	Winnipeg Jets	NHL	20	2	8	10	16	5	0	2	2	2
2023–24	Winnipeg Jets	NHL	78	11	26	37	37	4	1	0	1	2
2024–25	Winnipeg Jets	NHL	78	11	27	38	38	13	3	3	6	16
2025–26	Winnipeg Jets	NHL	60	8	6	14	28	—	—	—	—	—
NHL totals			846	145	205	350	434	70	10	10	20	44

=== International ===
Year	Team	Event	Result	GP	G	A	Pts	PIM
2009	Russia	U17	7th	5	8	2	10	18
2009	Russia	IH18	2nd place, silver medalist(s)	4	2	3	5	0
2010	Russia	U18	4th	7	5	2	7	4
2016	Russia	WCH	4th	3	1	0	1	0
2017	Russia	WC	3rd place, bronze medalist(s)	10	3	3	6	8
Junior totals				16	15	7	22	22
Senior totals				13	4	3	7	8

Awards and achievements
Preceded by Brett Connolly	Tampa Bay Lightning first-round draft pick 2011	Succeeded by Slater Koekkoek
