= Erik Gudbranson =

Canadian ice hockey player (born 1992)

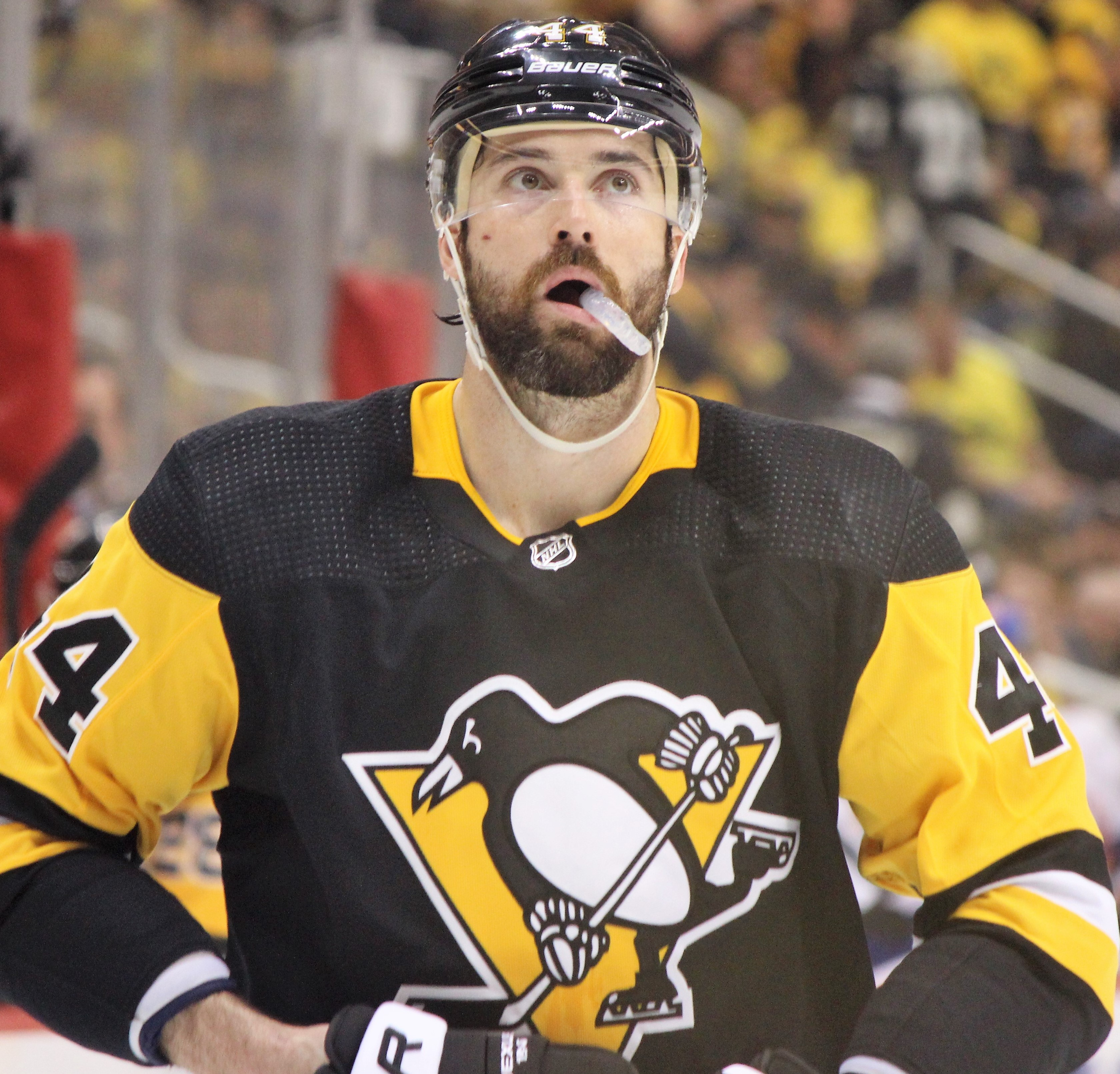
- Gudbranson with the Pittsburgh Penguins in April 2019
- Born: January 7, 1992 (age 34) Ottawa, Ontario, Canada
- Height: 6 ft 5 in (196 cm)
- Weight: 220 lb (100 kg; 15 st 10 lb)
- Position: Defence
- Shoots: Right
- NHL team Former teams: Columbus Blue Jackets; Florida Panthers; Vancouver Canucks; Pittsburgh Penguins; Anaheim Ducks; Ottawa Senators; Nashville Predators; Calgary Flames
- National team: Canada
- NHL draft: 3rd overall, 2010; Florida Panthers
- Playing career: 2011–present

Erik Donald Stanley Gudbranson (born January 7, 1992) is a Canadian professional ice hockey player who is a defenceman for the Columbus Blue Jackets of the National Hockey League (NHL). He was selected third overall by the Florida Panthers in the 2010 NHL entry draft. Gudbranson has previously played for the Florida Panthers, Vancouver Canucks, Pittsburgh Penguins, Anaheim Ducks, Ottawa Senators, Nashville Predators, and Calgary Flames.

== Playing career ==
=== Junior ===
==== Kingston Frontenacs ====
Gudbranson grew up playing minor hockey for the Gloucester Rangers AA rep teams in the ODHA before playing AAA Minor Midget in the OEMHL with the Ottawa Jr. 67's. He was drafted by the Ontario Hockey League (OHL)'s Kingston Frontenacs in the first round, fourth overall, in the 2008 OHL Priority Selection Draft.

In his rookie season with Kingston in 2008–09, Gudbranson had 3 goals and 22 points in 63 games with the rebuilding Frontenacs, who failed to qualify for the playoffs. He recorded his first career OHL point, getting two assists in a 6–2 loss to the Belleville Bulls on October 1. Gudbranson scored his first career OHL goal on January 23 against Jaroslav Janus of the Erie Otters in a 6–5 overtime loss.

Gudbranson then missed 27 games due to mononucleosis in the 2009–10 season, as he appeared in 41 games with the Frontenacs, scoring 2 goals and 23 points. In the playoffs, Gudbranson had a goal and two assists in seven games as Kingston lost to the Brampton Battalion in the first round of the playoffs. After the season, Gudbranson was awarded the Bobby Smith Trophy, an award given to the OHL Scholastic Player of the Year.

Gudbranson returned to Kingston for the 2010–11 season, where he saw a big improvement in his offensive numbers. Gudbranson scored 12 goals and 34 points in 44 games with Kingston, helping the club to the playoffs. In the playoffs, Gudbranson had a goal and four points in five games as the Frontenacs lost to the Oshawa Generals in the first round.

=== Professional ===
==== Florida Panthers ====
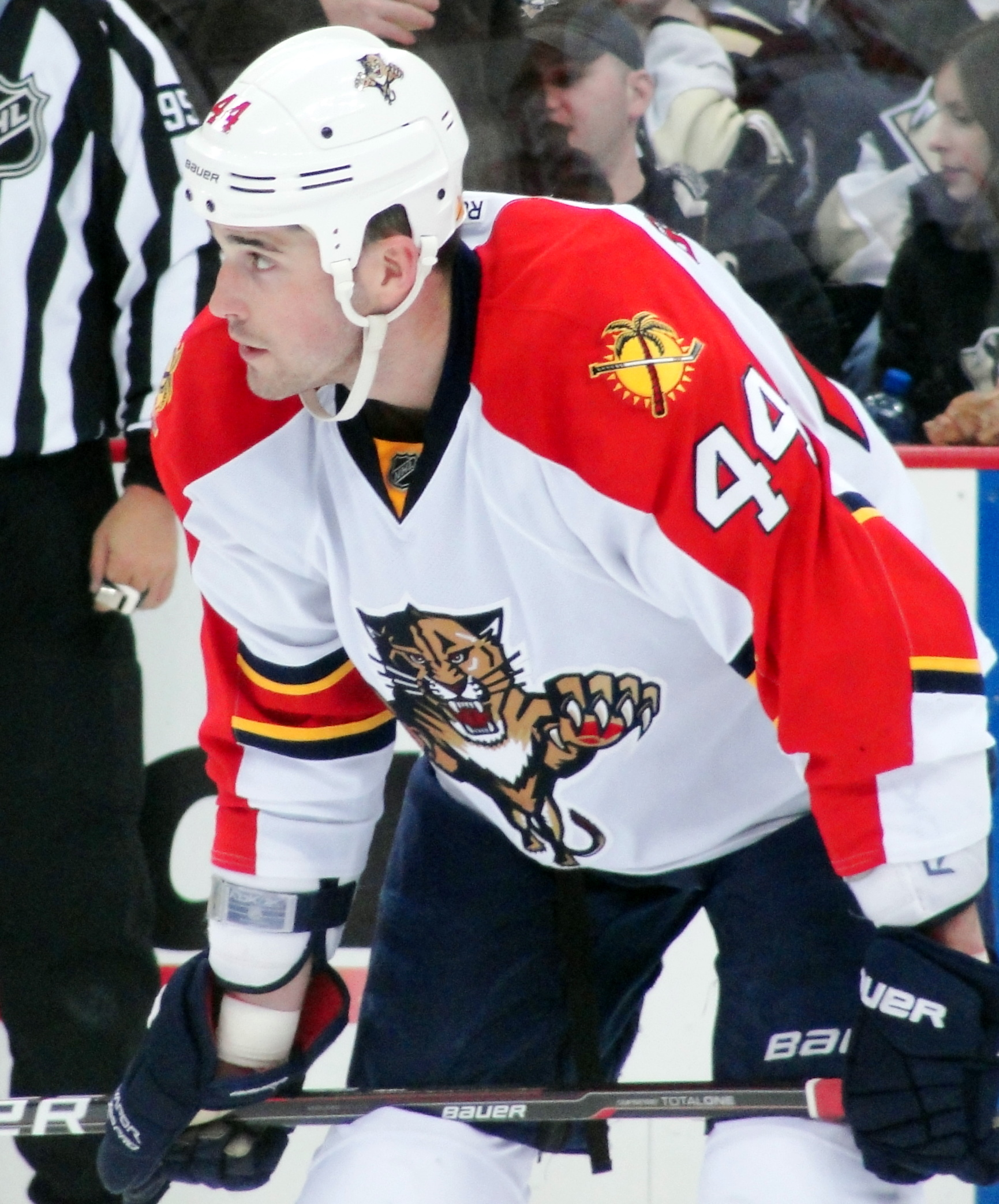
Gudbranson with the Florida Panthers in March 2012

Gudbranson made the Florida Panthers team for the 2011–12 season and made his NHL debut against the New York Islanders on October 8, 2011. He earned the first point of his NHL career on December 2, 2011, against the Los Angeles Kings, an assist. He scored his first NHL goal against Henrik Lundqvist of the New York Rangers during a 6–1 loss on December 11, 2011. At the end of the season, Gudbranson had two goals and eight points in 72 games, helping the Panthers reach the Stanley Cup playoffs for the first time since the 1999–2000 season. In the playoffs, Gudbranson was held pointless in seven games as Florida lost to the New Jersey Devils in the Eastern Conference Quarterfinals round.

In the 48-game, lock-out-shortened 2012–13 season, Gudbranson appeared in 32 games with Florida, earning four assists, as the club failed to reach the playoffs.

In the 2013–14 season, Gudbranson appeared in 65 games, scoring three goals and providing six assists. His defensive partner for the majority of the season was captain Ed Jovanovski, though he also spent time partnered with Dylan Olsen.

During the 2014–15 season, Gudbranson played in 76 games, scoring four goals and 13 points, both career highs. However, the Panthers failed to qualify for the playoffs for the third consecutive season.

Gudbranson played in 64 games in the 2015–16 season, scoring two goals and nine points, helping Florida into the playoffs for the first time since 2012. During the playoffs, Gudbranson was held off the score sheet in six games, as Florida lost to the New York Islanders in the first round (who won their first playoff series since 1993).

==== Vancouver Canucks ====
On May 25, 2016, Gudbranson was traded along with a 2016 fifth-round pick to the Vancouver Canucks in exchange for Jared McCann and both a second- and fourth-round pick in the 2016 NHL entry draft. At the time of the transaction, Canucks general manager Jim Benning thought his team needed a physical defenceman, while the Panthers felt that McCann was a better fit for its possession-based style of hockey than Gudbranson. Gudbranson and McCann later became teammates with the Pittsburgh Penguins in 2019.

Gudbranson joined the Vancouver Canucks for the 2016–17 season. He appeared in his first game with the Canucks on October 15, receiving 18:42 of ice time in a 2–1 shootout win over the Calgary Flames. On October 18, 2016, Gudbranson recorded his first point with the Canucks, an assist on a goal by Bo Horvat, in a 2–1 win over the St. Louis Blues. Gudbranson scored his first goal with Vancouver on December 8 in a game against the Tampa Bay Lightning, scoring against Ben Bishop in a 5–1 victory.

In an away game against the Toronto Maple Leafs on November 5, 2016, rookie Troy Stecher took a hit by Leaf enforcer Matt Martin in the third period, prompting a line brawl. Following the game, Gudbranson yelled, "Matt Martin's dead. Everyone can hear that now. F—— dead" on his way to the Canucks' dressing room. He later apologized. On December 19, Gudbranson underwent season-ending wrist surgery; he had one goal and five assists in 30 games up to that point.

On June 15, 2017, Gudbranson signed a one-year, $3.5 million contract extension with the Canucks for the 2017–18 season. On October 19, 2017, Gudbranson was assessed a five-minute major penalty for boarding and a game misconduct for a hit on Boston Bruins forward Frank Vatrano. On October 20, 2017, Gudbranson was given a one-game suspension for the hit.

On February 20, 2018, Gudbranson signed a three-year, $12 million contract extension with the Canucks.

==== Pittsburgh Penguins ====
After playing in 57 games and recording 8 points for Vancouver in the 2018–19 season, Gudbranson was traded to the Pittsburgh Penguins on February 25, 2019, in exchange for Tanner Pearson.

On April 12, Gudbranson recorded his first Stanley Cup playoff point, a goal assisted by Evgeni Malkin, during the Penguins' first-round 3–1 loss to the New York Islanders.

==== Anaheim Ducks ====
On October 25, 2019, after playing in seven games with the Penguins to open the 2019–20 season, Gudbranson was traded by Pittsburgh to the Anaheim Ducks in exchange for Andreas Martinsen and a seventh-round pick in the 2021 NHL entry draft. Gudbranson found a role on the Ducks blueline, matching a career-high four goals in just 44 games with Anaheim before the season was paused due to the COVID-19 pandemic.

==== Ottawa Senators ====
On October 8, 2020, Gudbranson was traded to his hometown Ottawa Senators in exchange for a 2021 fifth-round draft pick. He was named as an alternate captain ahead of the season, along with Thomas Chabot and Brady Tkachuk. In the pandemic delayed 2020–21 season, adding a veteran presence to the Senators blueline, Gudbranson collected 1 goal and 3 points through 36 regular season games.

==== Nashville Predators ====
On April 12, 2021, Gudbranson was traded by the Senators at the trade deadline to the Nashville Predators in exchange for a seventh-round pick in the 2023 NHL entry draft and minor league defenseman Brandon Fortunato. He finished the season appearing one point in eleven games for the Predators.

==== Calgary Flames ====
On September 10, 2021, Gudbranson as a free agent joined his seventh NHL club, in signing a one-year, $1.95 million contract with the Calgary Flames. With Calgary he set career highs in goals, assists, points, blocked shots, games played and plus/minus rating with six goals, eleven assists for 17 points, 92 blocked shots and a +15 plus/minus rating. The Calgary Flames topped the Pacific Division but were eliminated by the Edmonton Oilers in the playoffs.

==== Columbus Blue Jackets ====
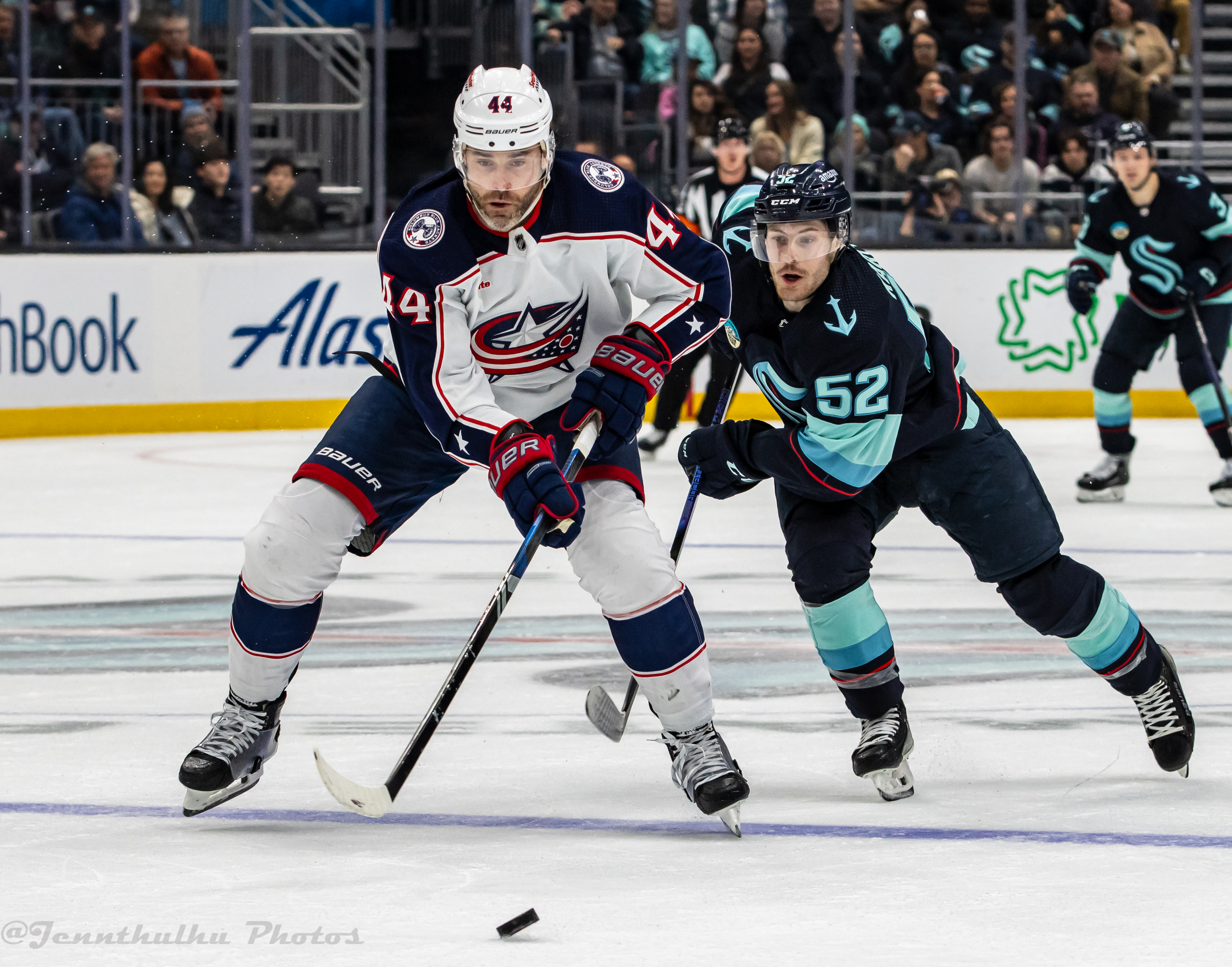
Gudbranson (left) making a play on the puck in a game in 2024.

On July 13, 2022, Gudbranson as a free agent joined his eighth NHL club, in signing a four-year, $16 million contract with the Columbus Blue Jackets. In his first season with Columbus, Gudbranson was one of the few Blue Jacket defensemen who remained healthy, appearing in 70 games, scoring one goal and 13 points.

== International play ==
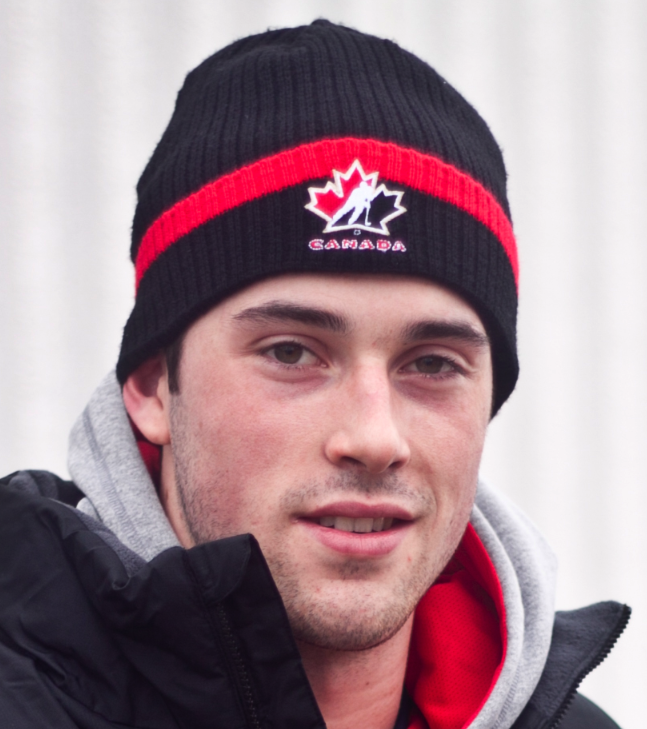

Medal record

Representing Canada

Ice hockey

World Junior Championships
Silver medal – second place	2011 USA	

Ivan Hlinka Memorial Tournament
Gold medal – first place	2009 Slovakia	

Gudbranson was invited to take part in Canada's 2011 National Junior Team selection camp. He was eventually named to the team. He helped Canada win the silver medal in the World Juniors Championship in 2010–11.

== Personal life ==
Gudbranson's younger brother Alex was selected by the Kingston Frontenacs in the first round of the 2010 OHL Priority Selection Draft. Alex currently plays with the North Dundas Rockets of the EOSHL. Gudbranson's youngest brother, Dennis, is a leukemia survivor. His sister, Chantal, is a graduate of the University of Guelph with a degree in Marine and Freshwater Biology and also played hockey for the Guelph Gryphons. Gudbranson is a supporter of Canadian Blood Services and promotes stem cell donation as a result of his brother's battle with leukemia.

== Career statistics ==
=== Regular season and playoffs ===
			Regular season					Playoffs
Season	Team	League	GP	G	A	Pts	PIM	GP	G	A	Pts	PIM
2007–08	Ottawa Jr. 67's AAA	HEO U16	28	11	14	25	24	8	1	4	5	8
2008–09	Kingston Frontenacs	OHL	63	3	19	22	69	—	—	—	—	—
2009–10	Kingston Frontenacs	OHL	41	2	21	23	68	7	1	2	3	6
2010–11	Kingston Frontenacs	OHL	44	12	22	34	105	5	1	3	4	10
2011–12	Florida Panthers	NHL	72	2	6	8	78	7	0	0	0	8
2012–13	Florida Panthers	NHL	32	0	4	4	47	—	—	—	—	—
2012–13	San Antonio Rampage	AHL	2	0	0	0	2	—	—	—	—	—
2013–14	Florida Panthers	NHL	65	3	6	9	114	—	—	—	—	—
2014–15	Florida Panthers	NHL	76	4	9	13	58	—	—	—	—	—
2015–16	Florida Panthers	NHL	64	2	7	9	49	6	0	0	0	2
2016–17	Vancouver Canucks	NHL	30	1	5	6	18	—	—	—	—	—
2017–18	Vancouver Canucks	NHL	52	2	3	5	35	—	—	—	—	—
2018–19	Vancouver Canucks	NHL	57	2	6	8	83	—	—	—	—	—
2018–19	Pittsburgh Penguins	NHL	19	0	2	2	4	4	1	0	1	2
2019–20	Pittsburgh Penguins	NHL	7	0	0	0	4	—	—	—	—	—
2019–20	Anaheim Ducks	NHL	44	4	5	9	91	—	—	—	—	—
2020–21	Ottawa Senators	NHL	36	1	2	3	47	—	—	—	—	—
2020–21	Nashville Predators	NHL	9	0	1	1	12	2	0	0	0	0
2021–22	Calgary Flames	NHL	78	6	11	17	68	12	0	1	1	0
2022–23	Columbus Blue Jackets	NHL	70	1	12	13	57	—	—	—	—	—
2023–24	Columbus Blue Jackets	NHL	78	6	20	26	74	—	—	—	—	—
2024–25	Columbus Blue Jackets	NHL	16	0	4	4	6	—	—	—	—	—
2025–26	Columbus Blue Jackets	NHL	37	1	2	3	19	—	—	—	—	—
NHL totals			842	35	105	140	864	31	1	1	2	12

=== International ===
Year	Team	Event	Result	GP	G	A	Pts	PIM
2009	Canada Ontario	U17	1st place, gold medalist(s)	6	2	2	4	0
2009	Canada	U18	4th	6	1	3	4	0
2010	Canada	U18	7th	6	0	1	1	4
2011	Canada	WJC	2nd place, silver medalist(s)	7	3	2	5	4
2014	Canada	WC	5th	8	1	0	1	6
Junior totals				25	6	8	14	8
Senior totals				8	1	0	1	6

Awards and achievements
Preceded by Dmitry Kulikov	Florida Panthers first-round draft pick 2010	Succeeded by Nick Bjugstad
