= Brett Connolly =

Canadian ice hockey player (born 1992)

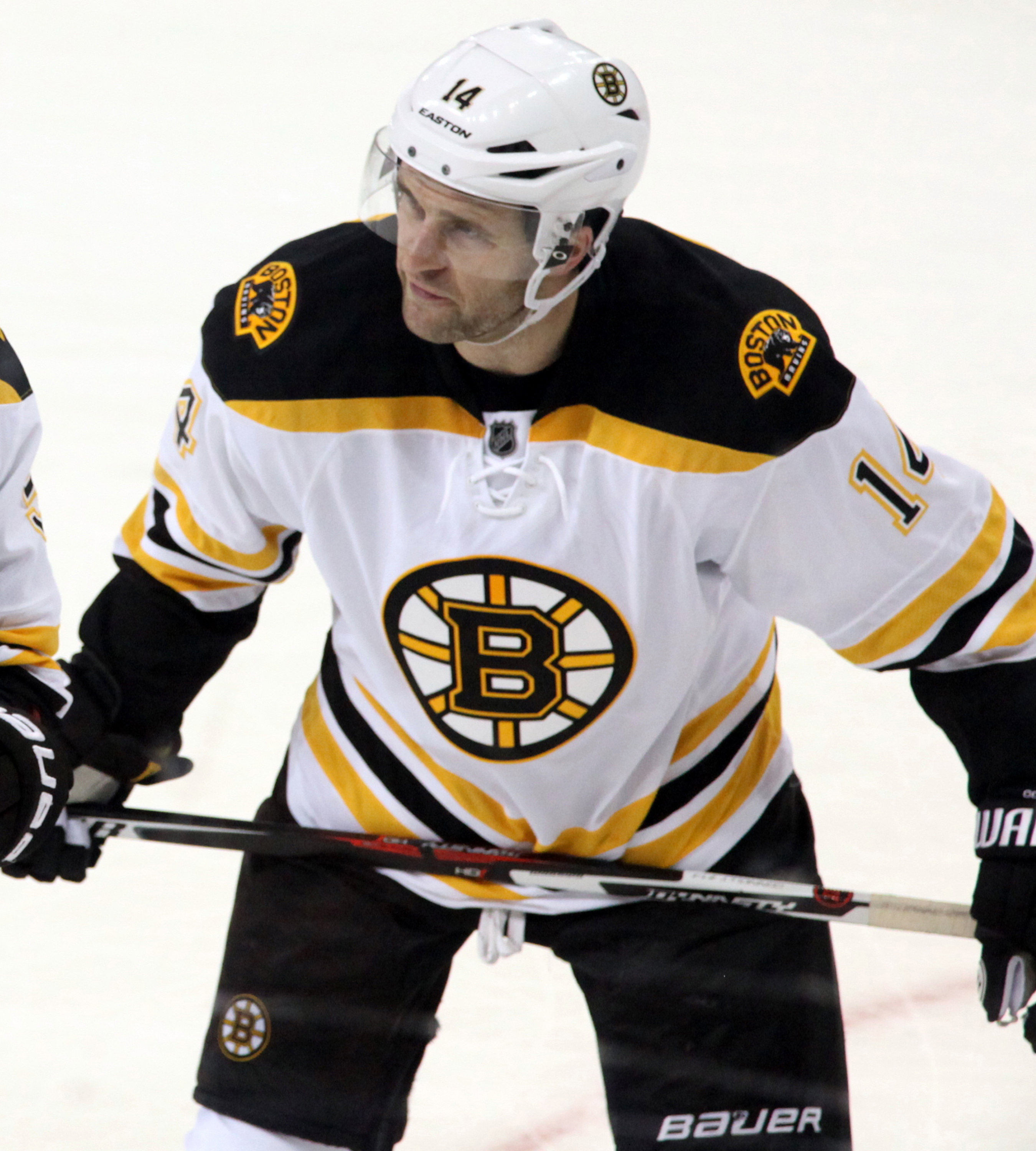
- Connolly with the Boston Bruins in 2015
- Born: May 2, 1992 (age 34) Campbell River, British Columbia, Canada
- Height: 6 ft 3 in (191 cm)
- Weight: 198 lb (90 kg; 14 st 2 lb)
- Position: Right wing
- Shot: Right
- Played for: Tampa Bay Lightning; Syracuse Crunch; Boston Bruins; Washington Capitals; Florida Panthers; Chicago Blackhawks; Rockford IceHogs; HC Lugano; SC Rapperswil-Jona Lakers
- NHL draft: 6th overall, 2010; Tampa Bay Lightning
- Playing career: 2011–2024

Brett Connolly (born May 2, 1992) is a Canadian former professional ice hockey player. During his major junior career with the Prince George Cougars, he was named Western Hockey League (WHL) and Canadian Hockey League (CHL) Rookie of the Year for the 2008–09 season. Selected sixth overall by the Tampa Bay Lightning in the 2010 NHL entry draft, he joined the team in 2011–12. He was later traded to the Boston Bruins, following which he signed with the Washington Capitals prior to the 2016–17 season. Connolly won the Stanley Cup as a member of the Capitals in 2018.

Internationally, Connolly has represented Canada at the 2009 IIHF World U18 Championships, 2009 Ivan Hlinka Memorial Tournament, 2011 IIHF U20 Championships and 2012 IIHF U20 Championships.

== Playing career ==
=== Amateur ===
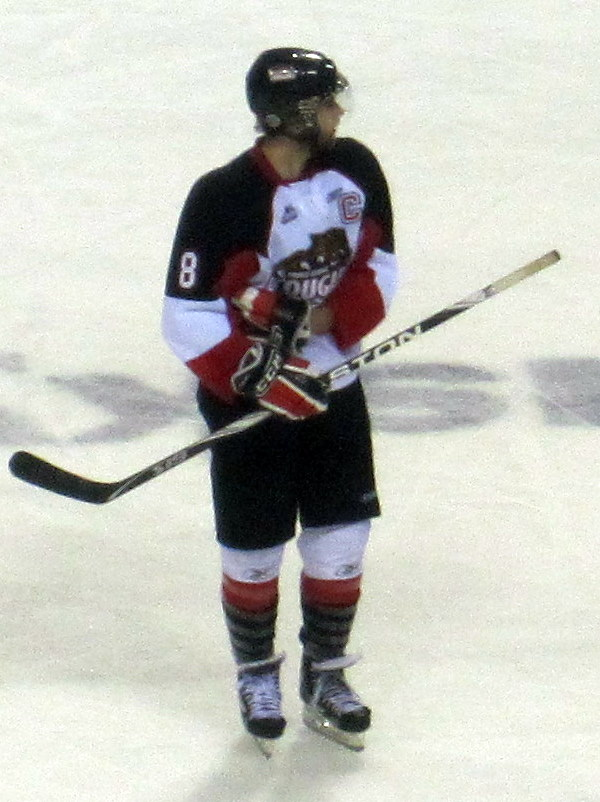
Connolly with the Prince George Cougars in November 2010

Raised in Prince George, British Columbia, Connolly was selected by his hometown Prince George Cougars as their first selection, tenth overall, in the 2007 WHL Bantam Draft. As a 15-year-old, he played major midget for the Caribou Cougars in Prince George, while also appearing in four WHL games. He joined the WHL's Cougars full-time in 2008–09, scoring 30 goals and 30 assists in 65 games. In doing so, he became the first 16-year-old to score 30 goals in the WHL since Patrick Marleau performed the feat in 1995–96. He was named the winner of the Jim Piggott Memorial Trophy as WHL rookie of the year. The recognition made him one of three nominees for the Canadian Hockey League (CHL) Rookie of the Year; he beat-out the Quebec Major Junior Hockey League (QMJHL)'s Dmitri Kulikov and the Ontario Hockey League (OHL)'s Evgeny Grachyov for the national distinction.

Connolly's second full WHL season was marred with hip problems. He played in just 12 of the Cougars' first 46 games and was sidelined from December 2009 before returning for the last four contests of the regular season. He was named to play in the 2010 CHL Top Prospects Game, but did not participate. He recorded 19 points over 16 games.

Connolly was highly ranked for the 2010 NHL entry draft. He was listed as the sixth-best player amongst North American skaters for the draft in the International Scouting Services' midterm rankings and finished the season 13th among all skaters. The NHL Central Scouting Bureau ranked him fourth overall amongst North American skaters in their midterm rankings, before moving him up a spot in their final rankings. The Hockey News listed him at fourth overall in their list end-of-year list. Scouts described Connolly as a natural leader with good on-ice awareness who plays in the style of a power forward. Connolly compared himself to Columbus Blue Jackets power forward Rick Nash. Connolly was selected sixth overall in the draft by the Tampa Bay Lightning.

Attending his first NHL training camp in September 2010, Connolly was returned to the Cougars to continue developing at the major junior level for the 2010–11 season. Whilst playing in his fourth WHL season, he was named captain of the Cougars and recorded 73 points over 59 games, leading his team in scoring.

=== Professional ===
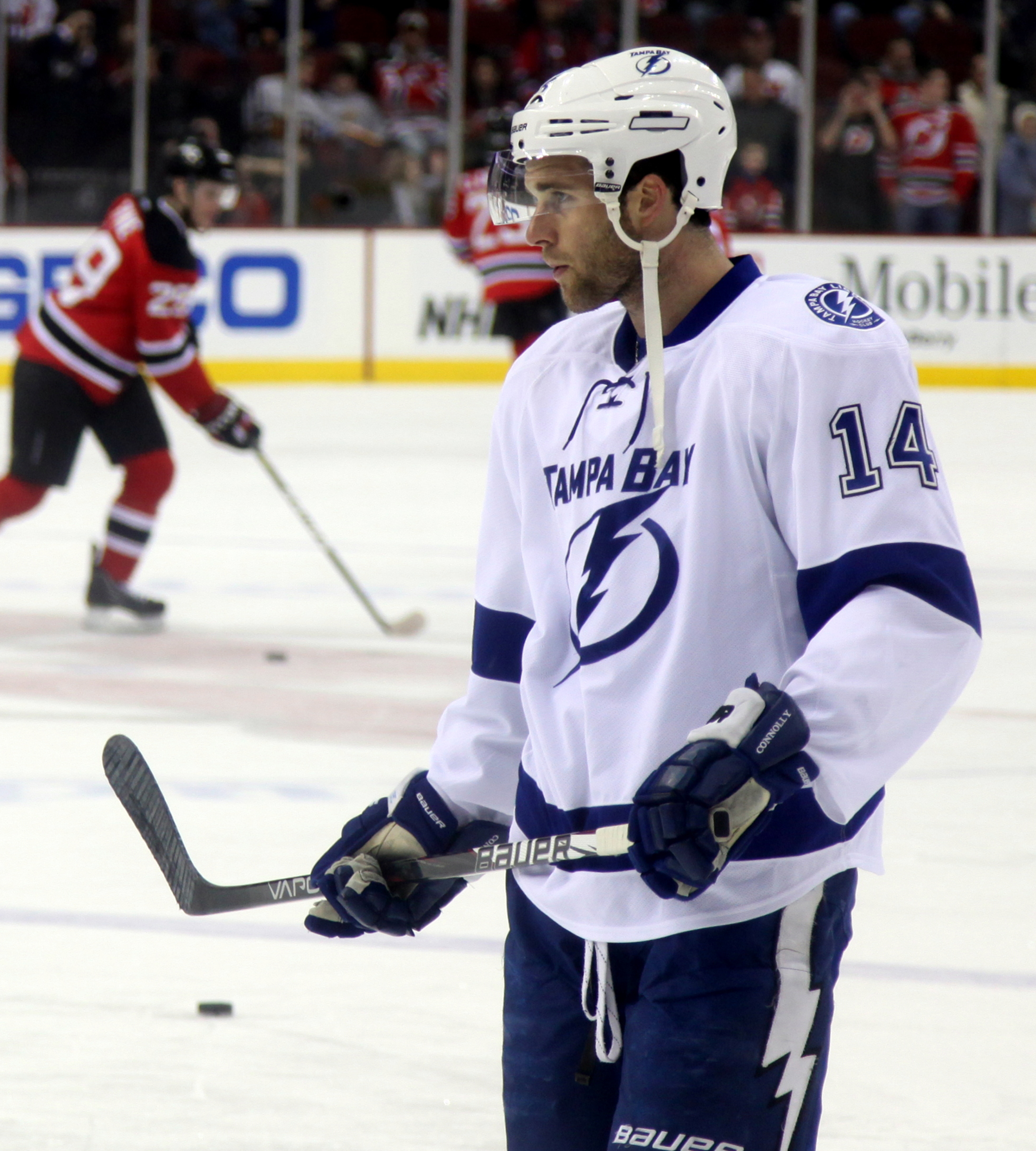
Connolly in February 2012.

==== Tampa Bay Lightning ====
Connolly made the Lightning's NHL roster in October 2011 out of training camp. He then scored his first career NHL goal on November 1 against Cam Ward of the Carolina Hurricanes. His first professional season, however, was interrupted when he was loaned to Team Canada for a second-straight appearance at the IIHF World U20 Championships.

On January 10, 2012, Prince George traded Connolly's WHL rights to the Tri-City Americans in exchange for a bantam draft pick and two conditional draft picks should Connolly return to the WHL; the condition was never met. Connolly finished his rookie NHL season with 68 games played and 15 points scored (four goals and 11 assists).

On September 14, 2012, the Tampa Bay Lightning assigned Connolly, as well as 17 others, to the American Hockey League (AHL)'s Syracuse Crunch during the 2012–13 NHL lockout. On April 4, 2013, Tampa recalled Connolly from the Crunch. In the AHL, he appeared in 67 games, registering 27 goals and 57 points to go along with a +15 plus-minus rating and 51 penalty minutes. He ranked second on the Syracuse roster in both goals and points, and third for assists with 30. After a five-game stint in which he scored one goal, on April 12, the Lightning reassigned Connolly back to the AHL. Connolly would then remain with Syracuse, where he helped the Crunch reach the Calder Cup Final against the Grand Rapids Griffins, though the team would be defeated in the six-game series.

In preparation for the upcoming 2013–14 season, Connolly had a strong training camp with the Lightning, scoring four goals during the pre-season. However, on September 29, Tampa Bay assigned Connolly to Syracuse as the team finalized its NHL roster. Connolly's demotion was in large part due to the impressive play of rookies Tyler Johnson, Ondřej Palát and Richard Pánik, who as a line had posted five goals and ten points in four pre-season games; the line was expected to serve as Tampa's third line, thereby relegating Connolly to limited fourth line minutes. Explaining the demotion, Lightning General Manager Steve Yzerman stated, "I don't want Brett playing on the fourth line. I want him playing a lot of minutes, he's got to go [to Syracuse] and be our top guy, be a leader and carry the team, if need be. That's another step for him. There's no plan to leave him there for any period of time."

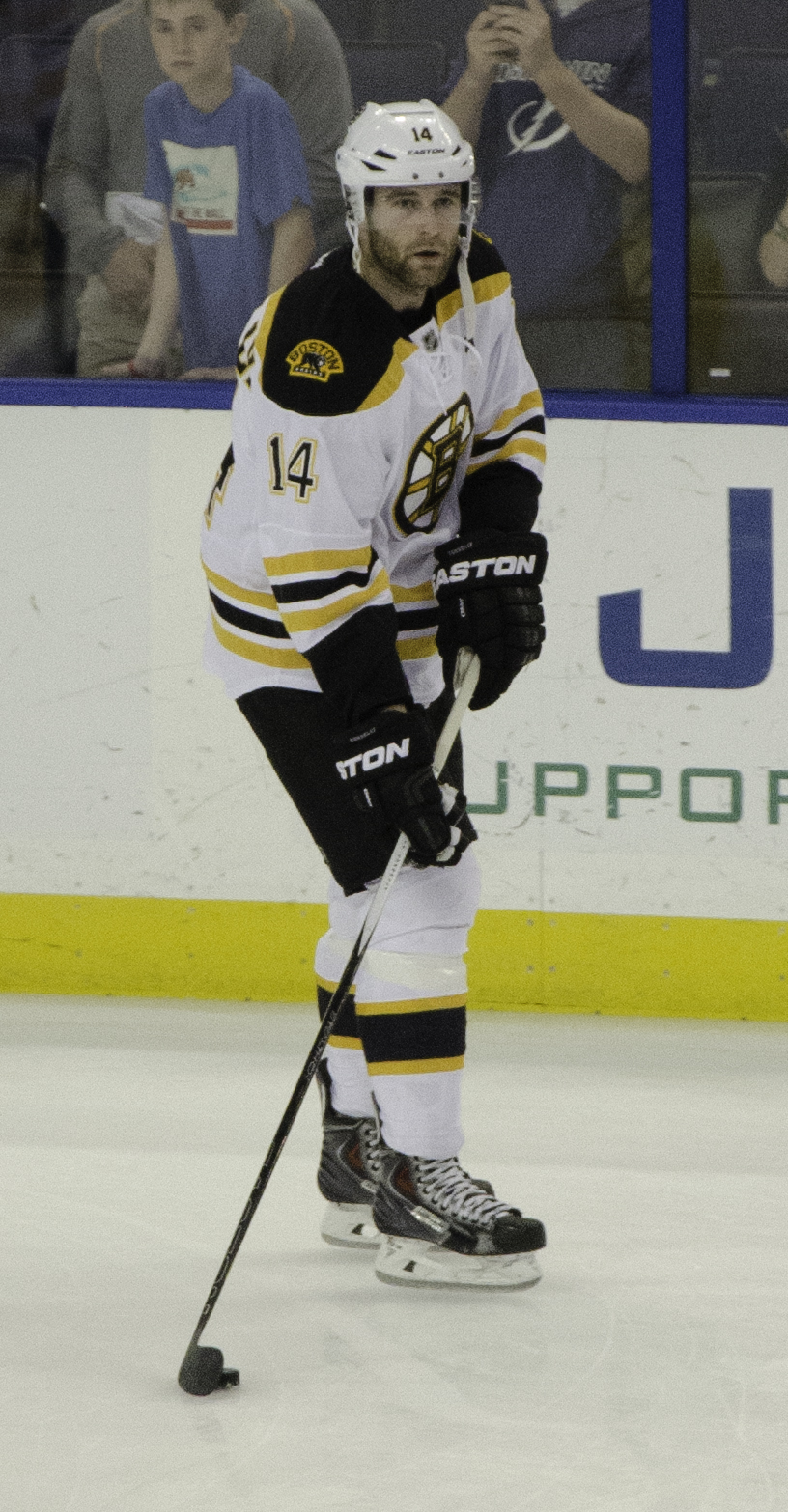
Connolly in April 2015.

On October 17, however, the Lightning recalled Connolly from Syracuse, appearing in one game with the team before again being reassigned on October 20. On October 31, the Tampa recalled Connolly, where he played in six games, scoring game-winning goal against the St. Louis Blues on November 2 before being demoted again on November 22. Connolly was named to the 2014 AHL All-Stars roster. He finished his NHL season with 11 games played and one goal scored while also playing in 66 AHL games, scoring 21 goals and 57 points, leading the Crunch in the latter statistic.

On July 10, 2014, the Lightning re-signed Connolly to a one-year, two-way contract. On October 24, Connolly played in the first period against the Winnipeg Jets, but he would miss the rest of the game with a lower body injury. After being out for nearly a month, Connolly returned to the lineup against the Toronto Maple Leafs on November 20. On December 6, Connolly played in his 100th career NHL game in 3–1 Lightning loss to the Columbus Blue Jackets.

==== Boston Bruins ====
On March 2, 2015, at the NHL trade deadline, Connolly was traded to the Boston Bruins in exchange for two second-round draft picks in 2015 and 2016. On March 4, he fractured his hand in his second skate with the Bruins. On April 3, Connolly made his debut with the Bruins, recording two assists in Boston's 3–2 win over the Detroit Red Wings.

On July 6, 2015, Connolly agreed to re-sign with the Bruins on a one-year contract as a restricted free agent.

==== Washington Capitals ====
Unable to live up to his draft expectations with the Lightning and the Bruins, Connolly, a restricted free agent, was not tendered a contract by Boston. On July 1, 2016, Connolly signed a one-year contract as a free agent with the Washington Capitals. On July 1, 2017, he signed a two-year contract extension with the Capitals.

In his first season with Washington, Connolly recorded a career-high 15 goals while appearing in 68 games. The following season, in 2017–18, he equaled that career best in goals while also recording a career-high 27 points. He appeared in all 24 playoff games for the Capitals in 2018 while scoring six goals and three assists, including the primary assist on Lars Eller's Stanley Cup-winning goal with 7:37 left in the third period of Game 5 of the 2018 Stanley Cup Final.

==== Florida Panthers ====
On July 1, 2019, having left the Capitals as a free agent after three seasons, Connolly signed a four-year, $14 million contract with the Florida Panthers. In his first year with the Panthers in the 2019–20 season, Connolly contributed with 19 goals and 33 points through 69 regular season games. He was scoreless in 4 qualifying playoff games, in a series defeat to the New York Islanders.

In the following pandemic-delayed 2020–21 season, Connolly struggled to repeat his offensive totals, producing just 2 goals and 4 points through 21 games before he was placed on waivers by the Panthers and assigned to the taxi squad.

==== Chicago Blackhawks ====
On April 8, 2021, Connolly was traded by the Panthers alongside Riley Stillman, the rights to Henrik Borgström and a 2021 seventh-round draft pick to the Chicago Blackhawks in exchange for Lucas Carlsson and Lucas Wallmark. He made 10 appearances to close out the season with the Blackhawks, registering 2 points.

In the following 2021–22 season, after attending training camp, Connolly was placed on waivers and re-assigned to begin the year with AHL affiliate, the Rockford IceHogs. Connolly made just 9 appearances throughout the season with the Blackhawks, unable to register a goal. He finished with 17 goals in 37 regular season games with the IceHogs.

On July 11, 2022, Connolly was placed on unconditional waivers by the Blackhawks for the purpose of buying out the remaining year on his contract, he was released as a free agent the following day.

==== Switzerland ====
Leaving the NHL and North America after 11 seasons, Connolly embarked on a European career, agreeing to a one-year contract with Swiss club HC Lugano of the NL on September 5, 2022. Connolly finished 2nd in points on the team with 12 goals and 26 assists for 38 points in 45 games.

In June 2023, Connolly signed with the SC Rapperswil-Jona Lakers of the NL. His season ended early after just 10 games, as he had to undergo season-ending hip surgery.

== International play ==
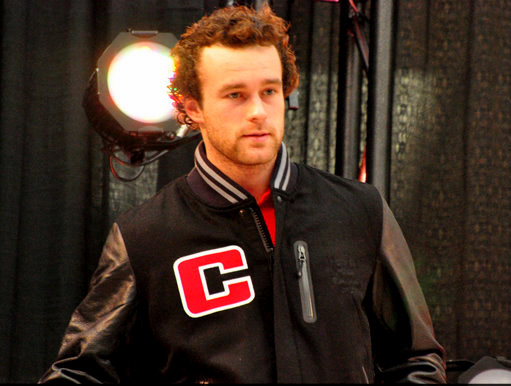
- Brett Connolly as a member of Team Canada at the 2012 World Junior Championships

Medal record

Representing Canada

Ice hockey

World Junior Championships
Silver medal – second place	2011 United States	
Bronze medal – third place	2012 Canada	

Ivan Hlinka Memorial Tournament
Gold medal – first place	2009 Czech Republic	

World U-17 Hockey Challenge
Silver medal – second place	2009 Canada	

Connolly made his international debut with Hockey Canada, representing Team Pacific (Note: Canada plays four regional teams – Pacific, West, Quebec and Ontario – at the World U-17 Hockey Challenge) at the 2009 World U-17 Hockey Challenge. He helped the team to the gold medal game, where they lost 5–1 to Team Ontario. Connolly recorded eight points (three goals and five assists) over six games. Several months later, he joined Team Canada for the 2009 IIHF World U18 Championships. He scored six points in six games as Canada placed fourth. Connolly remained with the national under-18 team for the Ivan Hlinka Memorial Tournament in August 2009. Connolly recorded an assist in the gold medal game, helping Canada to a 9–2 win over Russia. During the tournament, Connolly hurt his hip, a nagging injury that sidelined him long-term throughout the following season.

Connolly returned to the under-18 team the following year for the 2010 IIHF World U18 Championships in Minsk and Bobruisk, Belarus. Connolly recorded one goal over four games, as Canada finished in fourth place for the second consecutive year.

Moving on to the under-20 level, Connolly joined Canada's junior team for the 2011 World Junior Championships in Buffalo, New York. He recorded three assists over seven games, as Canada won silver. They lost in the gold medal game to Russia. Playing in his NHL rookie season the following year, the Tampa Bay Lightning loaned Connolly to the national junior team for the 2012 World Junior Championships.

In 2022, Connolly represented Team Canada for the first time at the senior level at the 2022 Spengler Cup. He scored 3 of Canada's 4 goals in the tournament in the team's first winless performance at the tournament ever.

== Personal life ==
Connolly declined the traditional White House visit after the Capitals won the Stanley Cup, stating that "It has nothing to do with politics, it’s about what’s right and wrong.” His wife Katrina is also from Canada.

== Career statistics ==
=== Regular season and playoffs ===
			Regular season					Playoffs
Season	Team	League	GP	G	A	Pts	PIM	GP	G	A	Pts	PIM
2007–08	Prince George Cougars	WHL	4	0	0	0	0	—	—	—	—	—
2008–09	Prince George Cougars	WHL	65	30	30	60	38	4	0	2	2	6
2009–10	Prince George Cougars	WHL	16	10	9	19	8	—	—	—	—	—
2010–11	Prince George Cougars	WHL	59	46	27	73	26	1	0	0	0	0
2011–12	Tampa Bay Lightning	NHL	68	4	11	15	30	—	—	—	—	—
2012–13	Syracuse Crunch	AHL	71	31	32	63	53	18	6	5	11	12
2012–13	Tampa Bay Lightning	NHL	5	1	0	1	0	—	—	—	—	—
2013–14	Syracuse Crunch	AHL	66	21	36	57	50	—	—	—	—	—
2013–14	Tampa Bay Lightning	NHL	11	1	0	1	4	—	—	—	—	—
2014–15	Tampa Bay Lightning	NHL	50	12	3	15	38	—	—	—	—	—
2014–15	Boston Bruins	NHL	5	0	2	2	10	—	—	—	—	—
2015–16	Boston Bruins	NHL	71	9	16	25	20	—	—	—	—	—
2016–17	Washington Capitals	NHL	66	15	8	23	40	7	0	0	0	0
2017–18	Washington Capitals	NHL	70	15	12	27	30	24	6	3	9	6
2018–19	Washington Capitals	NHL	81	22	24	46	24	7	2	0	2	6
2019–20	Florida Panthers	NHL	69	19	14	33	26	4	0	0	0	2
2020–21	Florida Panthers	NHL	21	2	2	4	2	—	—	—	—	—
2020–21	Chicago Blackhawks	NHL	10	1	1	2	2	—	—	—	—	—
2021–22	Rockford IceHogs	AHL	37	17	18	35	16	—	—	—	—	—
2021–22	Chicago Blackhawks	NHL	9	0	1	1	15	—	—	—	—	—
2022–23	HC Lugano	NL	45	12	26	38	28	4	0	2	2	6
NHL totals			536	101	94	195	241	42	8	3	11	14

=== International ===
Year	Team	Event	Result	GP	G	A	Pts	PIM
2009	Canada Pacific	U17	2nd place, silver medalist(s)	6	3	5	8	2
2009	Canada	U18	4th	6	3	3	6	4
2009	Canada	IH18	1st place, gold medalist(s)	2	0	1	1	0
2010	Canada	U18	4th	4	1	0	1	10
2011	Canada	WJC	2nd place, silver medalist(s)	7	0	3	3	0
2012	Canada	WJC	3rd place, bronze medalist(s)	6	5	1	6	4
Junior totals				31	12	13	25	20

== Awards and honours ==
Award	Year
WHL
All-Rookie Team	2009
Jim Piggott Memorial Trophy	2009
CHL All-Rookie Team	2009
CHL Rookie of the Year	2009
AHL
Second All-Star Team	2013
NHL
Stanley Cup champion	2018

== Notes ==
Awards and achievements
Preceded by Brayden Schenn	Winner of the Jim Piggott Memorial Trophy; 2008–09	Succeeded by Ryan Nugent-Hopkins
Preceded by Taylor Hall	Winner of the CHL Rookie of the Year Award; 2008–09	Succeeded by Matt Puempel
Preceded by Carter Ashton	Tampa Bay Lightning first-round draft pick 2010	Succeeded by Vladislav Namestnikov
