= Calvin Pickard =

Canadian ice hockey player (born 1992)

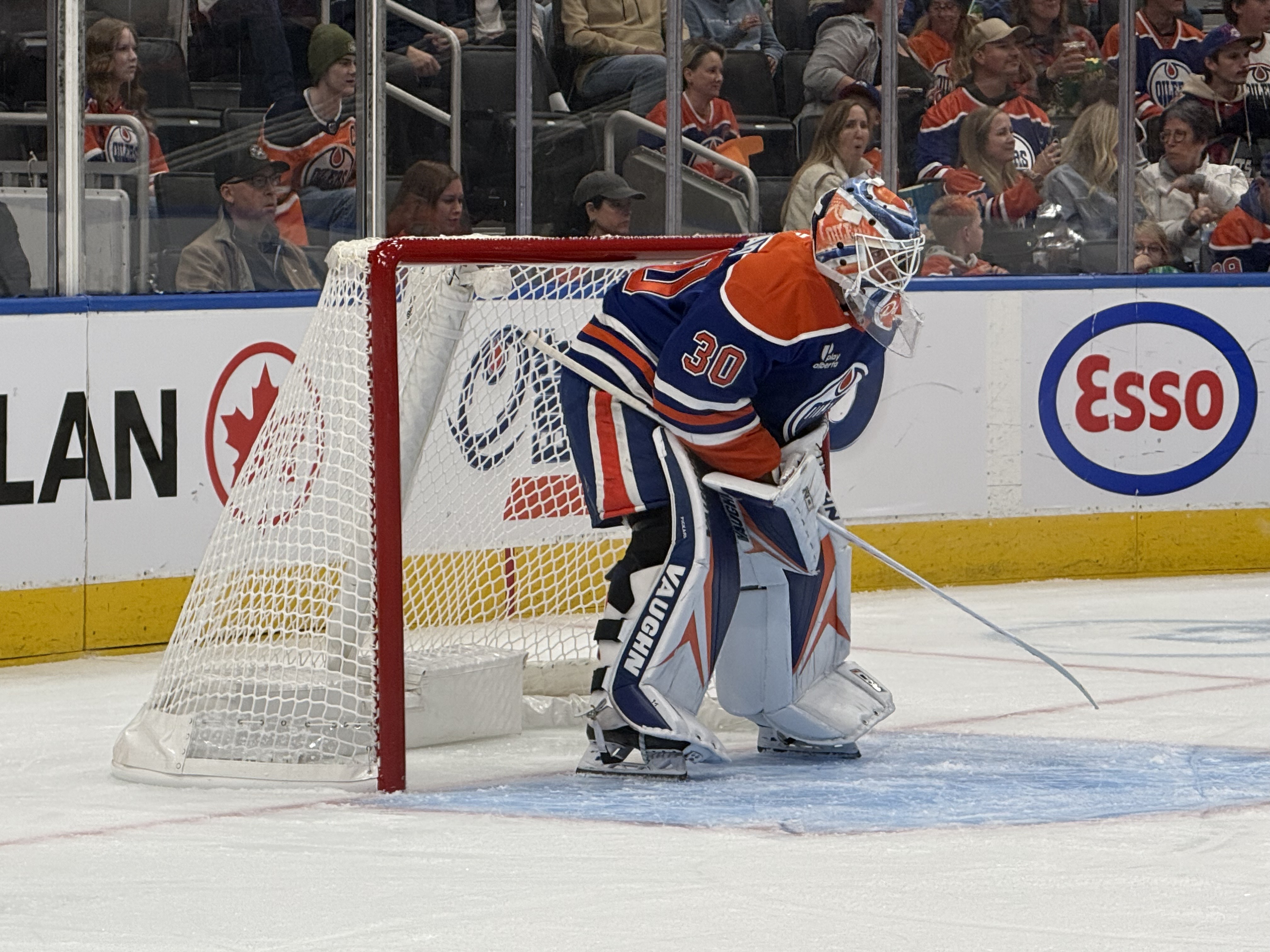
- Pickard with the Edmonton Oilers in 2025
- Born: April 15, 1992 (age 34) Moncton, New Brunswick, Canada
- Height: 6 ft 1 in (185 cm)
- Weight: 206 lb (93 kg; 14 st 10 lb)
- Position: Goaltender
- Catches: Left
- NHL team Former teams: Minnesota Wild; Colorado Avalanche; Toronto Maple Leafs; Philadelphia Flyers; Arizona Coyotes; Detroit Red Wings; Vienna Capitals; Edmonton Oilers
- National team: Canada
- NHL draft: 49th overall, 2010; Colorado Avalanche
- Playing career: 2012–present

Calvin Pickard (/ˈpɪkərd/ PIHK-uhrd; born April 15, 1992) is a Canadian professional ice hockey player who is a goaltender for the Minnesota Wild of the National Hockey League (NHL). He was selected in the second round, 49th overall, in the 2010 NHL entry draft by the Colorado Avalanche.

== Playing career ==
=== Amateur ===
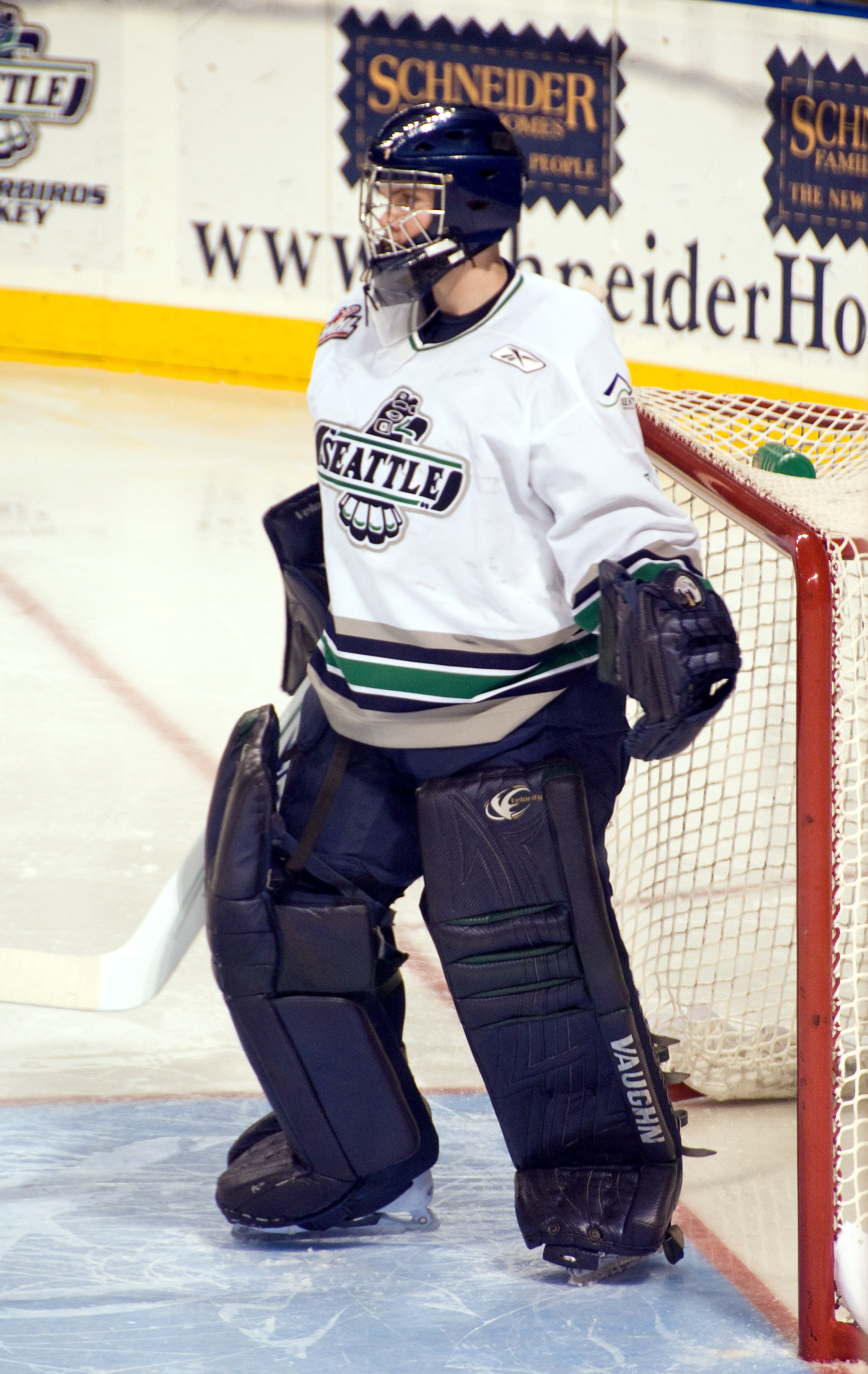
Pickard with the Seattle Thunderbirds in 2009

Pickard played for the Winnipeg Wild in the Manitoba U-18 'AAA' Hockey League (MMHL), posting a 1.91 goals-against average in 2007–08. As a bantam in 2006–07, he won a Manitoba Championship as well as the Top Goaltender award at the Western Canadian Championships.

Pickard began his major junior career with the Seattle Thunderbirds of the Western Hockey League (WHL) in 2008–09, with 23 wins in 47 games with a save percentage of 0.896 in his first season as a T-Bird. Seattle made the 2009 WHL Playoffs that season, but their stay was relatively short, as they were defeated in five games by Washington-state rivals, the Spokane Chiefs. Pickard played all five games, amassing only a single win but recording a respectable save percentage of 0.915.

In 2009–10, his second season with the Thunderbirds, Pickard was selected to represent the WHL in the 2009 Subway Super Series. Two months later, he was selected to play for Team Cherry in the 2010 CHL/NHL Top Prospects Game. Despite only totalling 16 wins in 62 games in his second season, Pickard posted an improved save percentage of 0.914 and was named to the 2010 WHL West First All-Star Team. Although ranked as the top North American goaltender by central scouting, Pickard was the third goaltender chosen in the 2010 NHL entry draft, when selected in the second round, 49th overall, by the Colorado Avalanche.

During the 2010–11 season with the Thunderbirds, Pickard was again selected to represent the WHL for the 2010 Subway Super Series. He was also invited to take part in Canada's National Junior Team selection camp for the 2011 World Junior Championships. He was not selected for the final roster. Pickard's third season with Seattle saw him compile 27 wins in 68 games with a save percentage of 0.916.

Unable to cement a place on the Avalanche's roster out of training camp, Pickard was reassigned to Seattle for the 2011–12 season. Pickard again represented the WHL for the third year in a row, at the 2011 Subway Super Series.

During a game against the Vancouver Giants on January 22, 2012, Pickard would set a new Western Hockey League record, as he made his 6,959th career save.

Upon completion of his fourth and final season in Seattle, where he posted 25 wins in 64 games with a save percentage of 0.906, Pickard spent the remainder of the season with the Avalanche's then-American Hockey League (AHL) affiliates, the Lake Erie Monsters. He played his first game as a professional in relief of Cédrick Desjardins in a 4–0 loss to the Texas Stars, on March 31, 2012.

=== Professional ===
==== Colorado Avalanche ====
On March 25, 2011, Pickard signed a three-year entry-level contract with the Colorado Avalanche. The 2012–13 AHL season was his first full season as a professional and Pickard played in 47 games for Lake Erie, recording 20 wins.

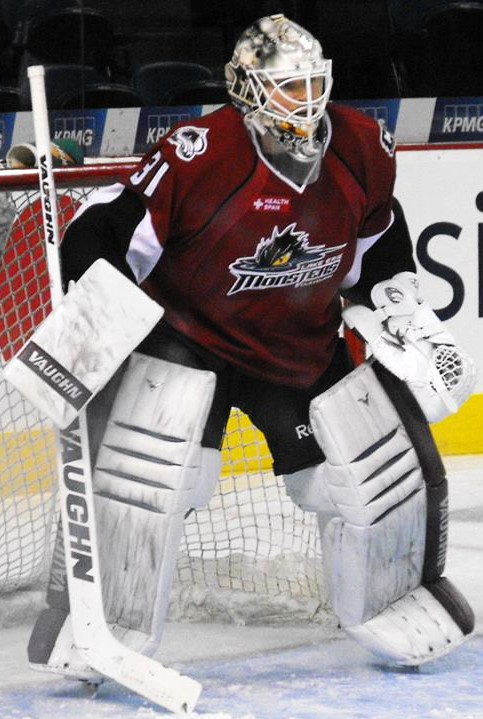
Pickard with the Lake Erie Monsters in 2013

Pickard began the 2014–15 season with the Monsters but was recalled to the Avalanche on October 16, 2014, after Semyon Varlamov was placed on injured reserve. He made his NHL debut the same day against the Ottawa Senators, replacing Reto Berra, who was injured in a collision; Pickard allowed four goals on 27 shots in a 5–3 loss. Pickard was sent back to the Monsters on October 25 but was recalled on November 18 after Varlamov suffered a groin injury. Pickard earned his first win on November 22 after coming in to relieve an ineffective Berra and stopped all 17 shots he faced in an eventual 4–3 overtime win. After more poor play from Berra, Pickard became the starting goaltender and continued in impressive form until Varlamov returned to the team, after which Pickard became the team's primary backup goaltender. Pickard was returned to Lake Erie on December 28 to resume a starting goaltender role. After beginning the 2015–16 season with Colorado's new AHL affiliate, the San Antonio Rampage, he was recalled early on in the season when Varlamov suffered another groin injury. He returned to the club in late December when Berra injured his ankle. Pickard recorded his first NHL shutout on January 16, 2016, against the New Jersey Devils.

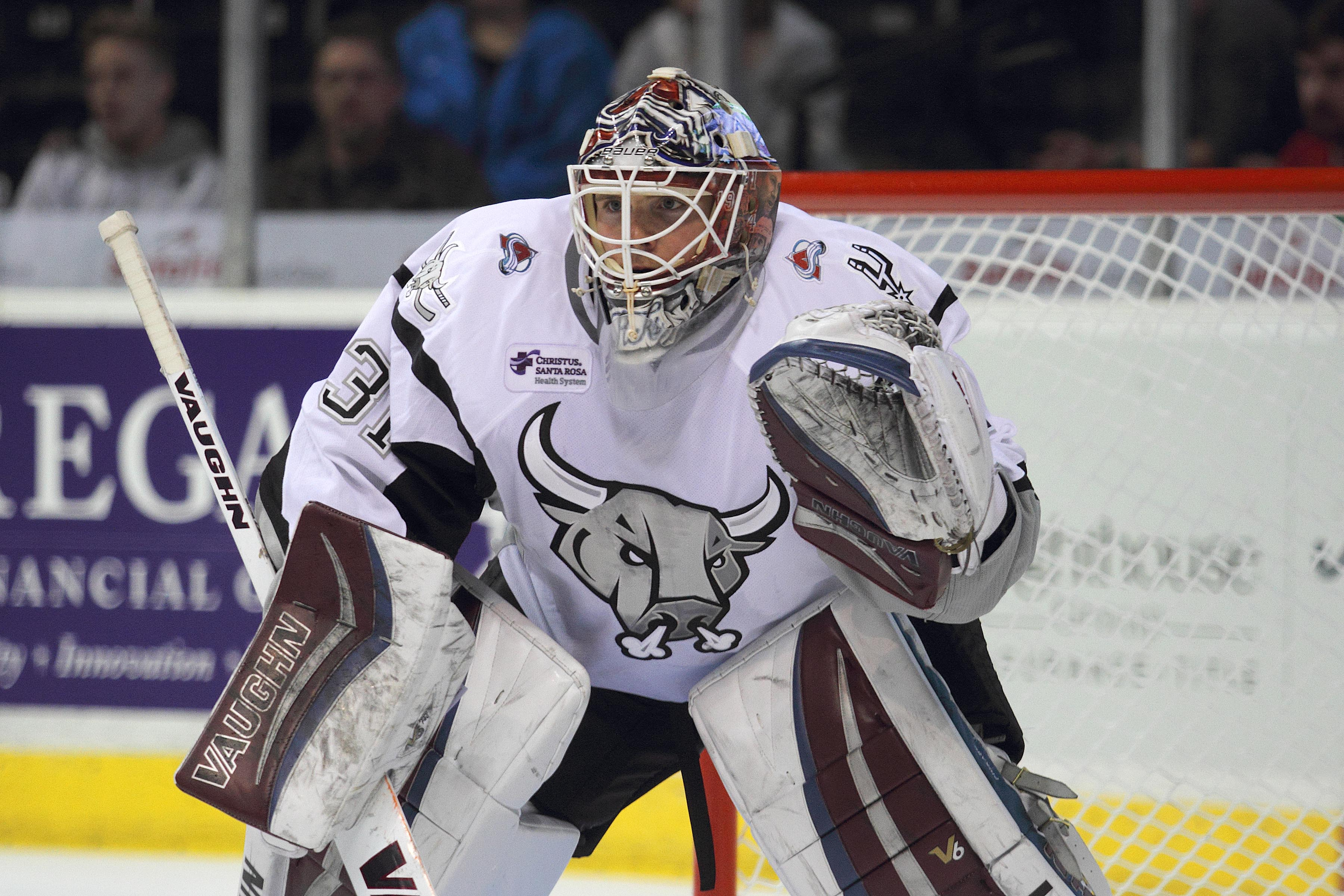
Pickard with the San Antonio Rampage in 2015

A restricted free agent, Pickard signed his first one-way deal with the Avalanche, agreeing to a two-year, $2 million contract on July 5, 2016. In his first full season in the NHL in 2016–17, Pickard was slated as the backup goaltender, however with an early season-ending injury suffered to Varlamov, Pickard was thrust into the starting role for the Avalanche. He established a career-high in making 50 appearances, leading the last-place Avalanche in save percentage, goals against average and wins.

==== Expansion draft selection, waiver exchanges ====
In the off-season, having been exposed at the 2017 NHL Expansion Draft, Pickard was the first player selected by the Vegas Golden Knights on June 21, 2017. Pickard was poised to be the Golden Knights' backup behind Marc-André Fleury heading into their inaugural season, even going as far to hold a contest with Vegas fans in the design of his goaltender mask. However, on October 3, the team claimed goaltender Malcolm Subban off waivers. With the Golden Knights deciding to go with a tandem of Fleury and Subban instead, Pickard was placed on waivers on October 5, in order to be sent to the team's AHL affiliate, the Chicago Wolves. He cleared the following day, but a few hours after clearing, Pickard was traded to the Toronto Maple Leafs in exchange for a 2018 sixth-round draft pick and Tobias Lindberg. As he had already cleared waivers, Pickard was immediately assigned to the Maple Leafs affiliate, the Toronto Marlies. On April 15, 2018, Pickard and fellow Marlies goaltender, Garret Sparks, were awarded the Harry "Hap" Holmes Memorial Award. After Pickard helped the Marlies win their first Calder Cup, he signed a one-year, $800,000 contract extension to stay with the organization.

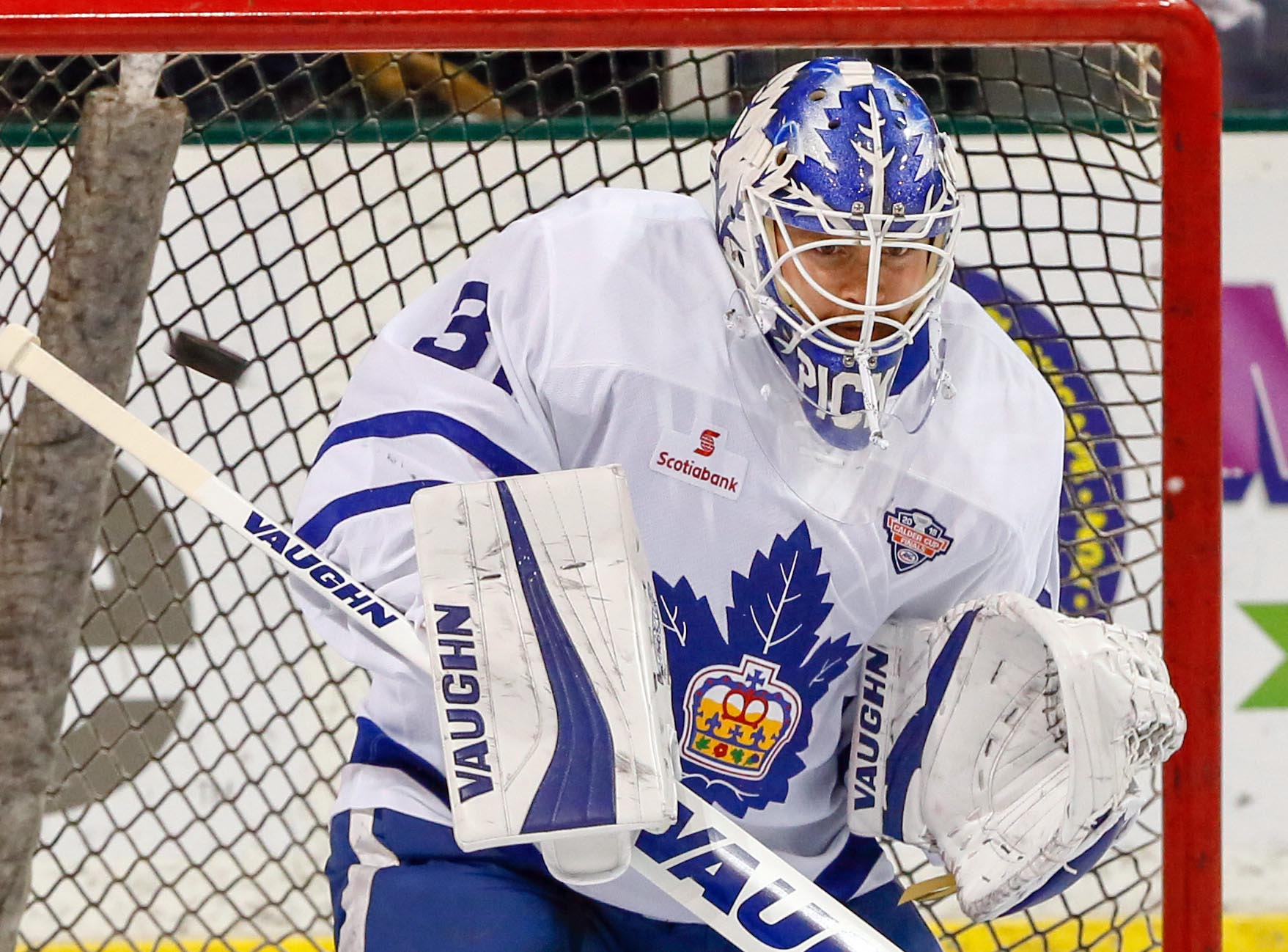
Pickard with the Toronto Marlies in 2018

During the 2018–19 pre-season, Sparks was chosen as the Maple Leafs' backup, forcing Pickard to be placed on waivers on October 1, 2018. He was claimed the following day by the Philadelphia Flyers.

On November 23, 2018, Pickard had the fourth shutout of his career and his first with the Philadelphia Flyers in a 4–0 victory over the New York Rangers in the Flyers' traditional Black Friday matinee. The following day, he surrendered four goals on six shots against the Toronto Maple Leafs and was pulled from the net in favour of Anthony Stolarz about twelve minutes into the contest. He did not start another game with the Flyers. With a .863 save percentage and a poor 4.01 goals against average, Pickard was once again placed on waivers on November 28. The following day, the Arizona Coyotes claimed Pickard off waivers. Remaining with the Coyotes as the club's third-choice goaltender, Pickard made six appearances for the club, unable to win a game.

==== Detroit Red Wings ====
A free agent from Arizona, Pickard signed a two-year, $1.5 million contract with the Detroit Red Wings on July 1, 2019, his fifth team in two years.

After a strong pre-season showing, Pickard was assigned to Detroit's affiliate, the Grand Rapids Griffins, with whom he played the majority of the campaign. He received the AHL Player of the Week award for the period ending January 12, 2020. He was recalled to the Red Wings on three separate occasions after goaltenders Jimmy Howard and Jonathan Bernier went down with minor injuries. Pickard appeared in three games for the Red Wings, going winless and allowing 15 goals with a 5.46 GAA. Pickard was returned to Grand Rapids to assist in their playoff push on January 23. Less than two months later, the season was indefinitely suspended due to the COVID-19 pandemic.

Prior to the 2020–21 NHL season, Detroit loaned Pickard to the Vienna Capitals of the ICE Hockey League on December 1, for conditioning purposes following an eight-month break in play. He had a 3–3 record before being recalled to Detroit on January 3, 2021. Pickard was waived following training camp for the purpose of assignment to their taxi squad. Pickard had a quiet season, only manning Detroit's crease six times, going 2–1–1. He was one of the bright spots of the Red Wings' year, as he earned back-to-back victories against the Columbus Blue Jackets in March.

On July 28, the Red Wings signed Pickard to a one-year contract extension, keeping him with the organization until the end of the 2021–22 season.

==== Edmonton Oilers ====
On July 13, 2022, Pickard signed a two-year, two-way free agent contract with the Edmonton Oilers. He spent the entirety of the 2022–23 season in the AHL with the Oilers' affiliate, Bakersfield Condors. After four games with Bakersfield to start the 2023–24 season, in which he had a 2–2–0 record and a .939 save percentage, Pickard was recalled by the Oilers on November 8, after Jack Campbell, the team's starting goaltender, was sent down to the AHL due to poor performance. While it had initially been intended that his time in the NHL be temporary, he performed sufficiently capably as a backup goaltender to Stuart Skinner that he was retained for the remainder of the season. He appeared in parts of 23 games for the Oilers, accruing a 12–7–1 record, a .909 save percentage and recording the fifth shutout of his career. This was the most NHL games he had played since leaving the Avalanche in 2017.

The Oilers qualified for the 2024 Stanley Cup playoffs, defeating the Los Angeles Kings in the first round. However, issues with Skinner's performance in net became increasingly prominent through the first three games of the team's second round series against the Vancouver Canucks, with a save percentage "among the worst in NHL history." After Skinner allowed four goals on 19 shots in the first two periods of game 3, Pickard made his NHL playoff debut in relief. He faced only three shots in the third period, stopping all of them, after which coach Kris Knoblauch opted to start Pickard in the critical game 4, with the Oilers seeking to avoid a 3–1 series deficit against the Canucks. Pickard made 20 saves in a 3–2 Oilers victory, earning praise for his performance. The Oilers later won the series 4–3 against the Canucks.

The Oilers entered the postseason once again the following year, qualifying for the 2025 Stanley Cup playoffs. The team experienced a difficult first two games in their first-round series against the Los Angeles Kings, with Pickard playing in relief of Skinner midway through the third period in game 2. Concerns were raised about Skinner's form and coach Knoblauch opted to start Pickard in game 3 as a result, where he made 24 saves in a 7–4 victory, avoiding a 3–0 series deficit. Pickard played the rest of the series and would go undefeated, posting a 4–0 record as the Oilers advanced to the second round. He would proceed to play the first two games of the second-round series against the Vegas Golden Knights, winning both games. Skinner eventually returned to the net in game 3, as Pickard would be sidelined with a lower-body injury. Skinner's performance recovered throughout the series and thanks to their combined efforts in net, the Oilers defeated the Golden Knights in five games. Pickard returned to the net in game 3 of the 2025 Stanley Cup Final, making his Stanley Cup Final debut. He returned in game 4 at the start of the second period after Skinner allowed three goals in the first. Pickard faced 22 shots en route to a 5–4 comeback victory for the Oilers.

==== Minnesota Wild ====
On July 1, 2026, Pickard signed a one-year, $1 million contract with the Minnesota Wild.

== International play ==
Medal record

Representing Canada

Ice hockey

Ice Hockey World Championships
Gold medal – first place	2016 Russia	
Silver medal – second place	2017 Germany/France	

Ivan Hlinka Memorial Tournament
Gold medal – first place	2009 Czech Republic	

Pickard first represented his country at the international level in December 2008, during the 2009 World U-17 Hockey Challenge and played in five games, winning three of his starts. He would represent Canada again at the 2009 Ivan Hlinka Memorial Tournament in August 2009. He won both games he played in, as Canada went on to win their fourteenth gold medal.

Pickard represented Canada at the U18 level again at the 2010 IIHF World U18 Championships, held in April 2010. Pickard celebrated his 18th birthday in style, backstopping Canada to a dominating victory over event host Belarus by a score of 11–3, on April 15. This was sadly Canada's only victory of the preliminary round, as they ultimately finished the tournament in seventh place.

Following a second successful season as a backup with the Avalanche, Pickard was selected for his first senior international tournament for Canada at the 2016 World Championships in Russia. He played two round-robin games for Canada, winning both times, en route to a gold medal.

With the Avalanche eliminated from post-season contention, Pickard represented Canada again at the 2017 World Championships, held in Germany/France. Sweden won the tournament by defeating Canada 2–1 after a penalty shoot-out, with Pickard earning himself a silver medal in a losing effort.

== Personal life ==
Pickard was born in Moncton, New Brunswick to parents, Cathy and Dan. They later moved to Winnipeg, Manitoba, when he was seven. His older brother, Chet, a first-round draft pick of the Nashville Predators in 2008, was also a professional goaltender and played with German Deutsche Eishockey Liga (DEL) clubs, the Iserlohn Roosters, Adler Mannheim and Grizzlys Wolfsburg. He also has a sister, Kelly.

Pickard married his wife, Courtney, in Winnipeg in June 2018. They have two daughters, Blakely and Ryla.

== Career statistics ==
=== Regular season and playoffs ===
			Regular season									Playoffs
Season	Team	League	GP	W	L	OTL	MIN	GA	SO	GAA	SV%	GP	W	L	MIN	GA	SO	GAA	SV%
2008–09	Seattle Thunderbirds	WHL	47	23	16	5	2,694	137	3	3.05	.896	5	1	4	297	15	0	3.03	.915
2009–10	Seattle Thunderbirds	WHL	62	16	34	12	3,688	190	3	3.09	.914	—	—	—	—	—	—	—	—
2010–11	Seattle Thunderbirds	WHL	68	27	33	8	4,013	225	1	3.36	.916	—	—	—	—	—	—	—	—
2011–12	Seattle Thunderbirds	WHL	64	25	37	2	3,630	217	5	3.59	.906	—	—	—	—	—	—	—	—
2011–12	Lake Erie Monsters	AHL	2	1	0	0	77	4	0	3.12	.892	—	—	—	—	—	—	—	—
2012–13	Lake Erie Monsters	AHL	47	20	19	5	2,749	113	5	2.47	.918	—	—	—	—	—	—	—	—
2013–14	Lake Erie Monsters	AHL	43	16	18	7	2,445	116	2	2.85	.906	—	—	—	—	—	—	—	—
2014–15	Lake Erie Monsters	AHL	50	23	17	9	2,943	128	3	2.61	.917	—	—	—	—	—	—	—	—
2014–15	Colorado Avalanche	NHL	16	6	7	3	895	35	0	2.35	.932	—	—	—	—	—	—	—	—
2015–16	San Antonio Rampage	AHL	21	9	8	4	1,264	58	1	2.75	.917	—	—	—	—	—	—	—	—
2015–16	Colorado Avalanche	NHL	20	7	6	1	975	42	1	2.56	.922	—	—	—	—	—	—	—	—
2016–17	Colorado Avalanche	NHL	50	15	31	2	2,821	140	2	2.98	.904	—	—	—	—	—	—	—	—
2017–18	Toronto Marlies	AHL	31	21	9	1	1,923	74	1	2.31	.918	3	1	0	120	2	0	1.00	.956
2017–18	Toronto Maple Leafs	NHL	1	0	0	1	63	4	0	3.81	.857	—	—	—	—	—	—	—	—
2018–19	Philadelphia Flyers	NHL	11	4	2	2	465	31	1	4.01	.863	—	—	—	—	—	—	—	—
2018–19	Arizona Coyotes	NHL	6	0	4	0	283	17	0	3.60	.892	—	—	—	—	—	—	—	—
2018–19	Tucson Roadrunners	AHL	4	3	0	0	190	11	0	3.47	.889	—	—	—	—	—	—	—	—
2019–20	Grand Rapids Griffins	AHL	33	17	12	4	1,953	93	3	2.86	.903	—	—	—	—	—	—	—	—
2019–20	Detroit Red Wings	NHL	3	0	2	0	165	15	0	5.46	.797	—	—	—	—	—	—	—	—
2020–21	Vienna Capitals	ICEHL	6	3	3	0	367	12	0	1.96	.919	—	—	—	—	—	—	—	—
2020–21	Detroit Red Wings	NHL	6	2	1	1	304	16	0	3.16	.874	—	—	—	—	—	—	—	—
2020–21	Grand Rapids Griffins	AHL	3	1	1	1	180	10	0	3.33	.882	—	—	—	—	—	—	—	—
2021–22	Grand Rapids Griffins	AHL	43	21	16	5	2,535	109	1	2.58	.918	—	—	—	—	—	—	—	—
2021–22	Detroit Red Wings	NHL	3	1	1	0	126	9	0	4.30	.875	—	—	—	—	—	—	—	—
2022–23	Bakersfield Condors	AHL	38	23	12	2	2,244	101	4	2.70	.912	2	0	2	119	6	0	3.04	.903
2023–24	Bakersfield Condors	AHL	4	2	2	0	236	8	0	2.03	.939	—	—	—	—	—	—	—	—
2023–24	Edmonton Oilers	NHL	23	12	7	1	1,296	53	1	2.45	.909	3	1	1	136	5	0	2.21	.915
2024–25	Edmonton Oilers	NHL	36	22	10	1	1,882	85	0	2.71	.900	10	7	1	526	25	0	2.85	.886
2025–26	Edmonton Oilers	NHL	16	5	6	2	864	53	0	3.68	.871	—	—	—	—	—	—	—	—
2025–26	Bakersfield Condors	AHL	8	4	3	1	442	26	1	3.26	.886	—	—	—	—	—	—	—	—
NHL totals			191	74	77	14	10,146	500	5	2.96	.901	13	8	2	662	30	0	2.72	.892
ICEHL totals			6	3	3	0	367	12	0	1.96	.919	—	—	—	—	—	—	—	—

=== International ===
Year	Team	Event	Result	GP	W	L	T	MIN	GA	SO	GAA	SV%
2009	Canada Western	U17	4th	5	3	2	0	280	17	0	3.64	.895
2009	Canada	IH18	1st place, gold medalist(s)	2	2	0	0	120	5	0	2.50	.906
2010	Canada	U18	7th	6	3	3	0	314	15	0	2.87	.894
2016	Canada	WC	1st place, gold medalist(s)	2	2	0	0	120	1	1	0.50	.971
2017	Canada	WC	2nd place, silver medalist(s)	7	5	2	0	444	11	1	1.49	.938
Junior totals				13	8	5	0	714	37	0	3.11	.898
Senior totals				9	7	2	0	564	12	2	1.28	.944

== Awards and honours ==
Award	Year
WHL
West First All-Star Team	2010
West Second All-Star Team	2011
CHL
Subway Super Series participant	2009, 2010, 2011
CHL/NHL Top Prospects Game	2010
AHL
Harry "Hap" Holmes Memorial Award	2018
Calder Cup	2018
Player of the Week (January 5-12, 2020)	2020
