= John McFarland (ice hockey) =

Canadian ice hockey player

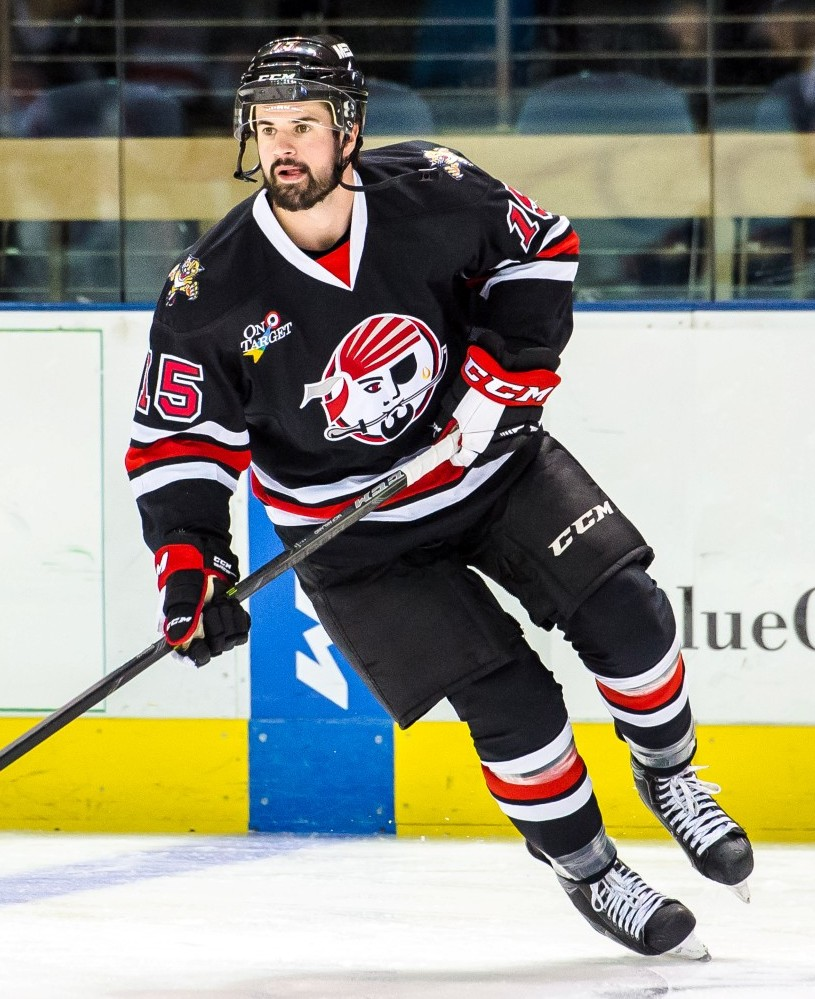
- McFarland with the Portland Pirates in 2015
- Born: April 2, 1992 (age 34) Richmond Hill, Ontario, Canada
- Height: 6 ft 0 in (183 cm)
- Weight: 192 lb (87 kg; 13 st 10 lb)
- Position: Right wing
- Shot: Right
- Played for: Florida Panthers; SaiPa
- NHL draft: 33rd overall, 2010; Florida Panthers
- Playing career: 2012–2019

John McFarland (born April 2, 1992) is a Canadian former professional ice hockey winger who played in the National Hockey League (NHL) with the Florida Panthers. He was taken first overall in the 2008 Ontario Hockey League (OHL) Priority Selection by the Sudbury Wolves. He was selected by the Panthers in the second round, 33rd overall, of the 2010 NHL entry draft. McFarland retired from professional hockey on February 6, 2019. In 2021, he was hired as an assistant coach for the OHL's Kingston Frontenacs.

== Playing career ==
In 2007, McFarland was turned down in his request to play in the OHL because of a Hockey Canada provision. Instead McFarland played the 2007–08 season with the Toronto Jr. Canadiens, where he accumulated 165 points, with 96 goals, and 69 assists. McFarland was named the tournament's most valuable player at the 2008 OHL Showcase tournament, where he captained the Jr. Canadiens to an OHL Cup win.

The Sudbury Wolves drafted McFarland first overall in the 2008 OHL Priority Selection. McFarland was the winner of the Jack Ferguson Award, which the OHL presents annually to the player picked first overall in the OHL Priority Selection. He then signed with the Wolves in August 2008. McFarland played his first OHL game on September 19, 2008. McFarland scored his first goal in the OHL on October 17, 2008 against goaltender Trevor Cann from the Peterborough Petes in a 5–4 win. He then went on to win the OHL Rookie of the Month for October 2008, finishing the month with 5 goals and 6 assists for 11 points in 12 games.

McFarland was drafted by the Florida Panthers 33rd Overall in the 2010 NHL entry draft.

On December 9, 2010, Sudbury traded McFarland (along with defenseman Ben Chiarot and a third-round pick in 2011) to the Saginaw Spirit in exchange for Michael Sgarbossa, Alex Racino, Frank Schumacher and a fourth-round pick.

After four seasons as a professional within the Florida Panthers organization, McFarland left as a free agent to sign a one-year contract with Finnish club, SaiPa of the top-tier Liiga on July 24, 2016.

McFarland spent two seasons abroad, with SaiPa of Finland and Swiss second division outfit HC La Chaux-de-Fonds before opting to return to North America as a free agent, and later securing a one-year AHL contract with the Bakersfield Condors, an affiliate to the Edmonton Oilers, on August 1, 2018. In the 2018–19 season, McFarland opened the campaign with the Condors before he was reassigned to ECHL affiliate, the Wichita Thunder. He registered 4 assists in 10 games with the Thunder, before returning to the Condors. On February 1, 2019, McFarland was released from his contract with the Condors after opting to retire from professional hockey.

== International play ==
Medal record

Representing Canada

Ice hockey

Ivan Hlinka Memorial Tournament
Gold medal – first place	2009 Slovakia	

World U-17 Hockey Challenge
Gold medal – first place	2009 British Columbia	

During his rookie season in the OHL, McFarland competed for Team Ontario in the 2009 World U-17 Hockey Challenge on Vancouver Island where his Team Canada won the gold medal. He was the tournament scoring leader, with a total of 12 points, and was also on the tournament all-star team.

McFarland was named captain when he played for Team Canada at the 2009 Ivan Hlinka Memorial Tournament

== Career statistics ==
=== Regular season and playoffs ===
			Regular season					Playoffs
Season	Team	League	GP	G	A	Pts	PIM	GP	G	A	Pts	PIM
2007–08	Toronto Jr. Canadiens	GTHL	49	96	69	165	—	—	—	—	—	—
2008–09	Sudbury Wolves	OHL	58	21	31	52	36	6	1	3	4	2
2009–10	Sudbury Wolves	OHL	64	20	30	50	70	4	3	0	3	2
2010–11	Sudbury Wolves	OHL	12	6	4	10	13	—	—	—	—	—
2010–11	Saginaw Spirit	OHL	37	19	9	28	33	12	5	4	9	6
2011–12	Saginaw Spirit	OHL	36	20	21	41	18	—	—	—	—	—
2011–12	Ottawa 67's	OHL	13	4	5	9	10	—	—	—	—	—
2012–13	San Antonio Rampage	AHL	43	5	9	14	10	—	—	—	—	—
2012–13	Cincinnati Cyclones	ECHL	23	12	13	25	12	12	4	5	9	6
2013–14	San Antonio Rampage	AHL	45	10	14	24	17	—	—	—	—	—
2013–14	Cincinnati Cyclones	ECHL	20	8	5	13	4	—	—	—	—	—
2014–15	San Antonio Rampage	AHL	46	10	9	19	8	3	1	0	1	6
2015–16	Portland Pirates	AHL	56	14	10	24	47	4	0	0	0	0
2015–16	Florida Panthers	NHL	3	0	0	0	0	—	—	—	—	—
2016–17	SaiPa	Liiga	21	3	6	9	4	—	—	—	—	—
2017–18	La Chaux-de-Fonds	SL	11	6	1	7	20	—	—	—	—	—
2018–19	Bakersfield Condors	AHL	9	0	0	0	2	—	—	—	—	—
2018–19	Wichita Thunder	ECHL	10	0	4	4	8	—	—	—	—	—
NHL totals			3	0	0	0	0	—	—	—	—	—

=== International ===
Year	Team	Event	Result	GP	G	A	Pts	PIM
2009	Canada Ontario	U17	1st place, gold medalist(s)	6	9	4	13	4
2009	Canada	U18	4th	6	3	5	8	6
2010	Canada	U18	7th	6	4	1	5	8
Junior totals				18	16	10	26	18

== Awards and honours ==
Award	Year
OHL
Jack Ferguson Award	2008
Rookie of the Month; October	2009
International
U17 WHC All-Star Team	2009
