= Brandon Gormley =

Canadian ice hockey player (born 1992)

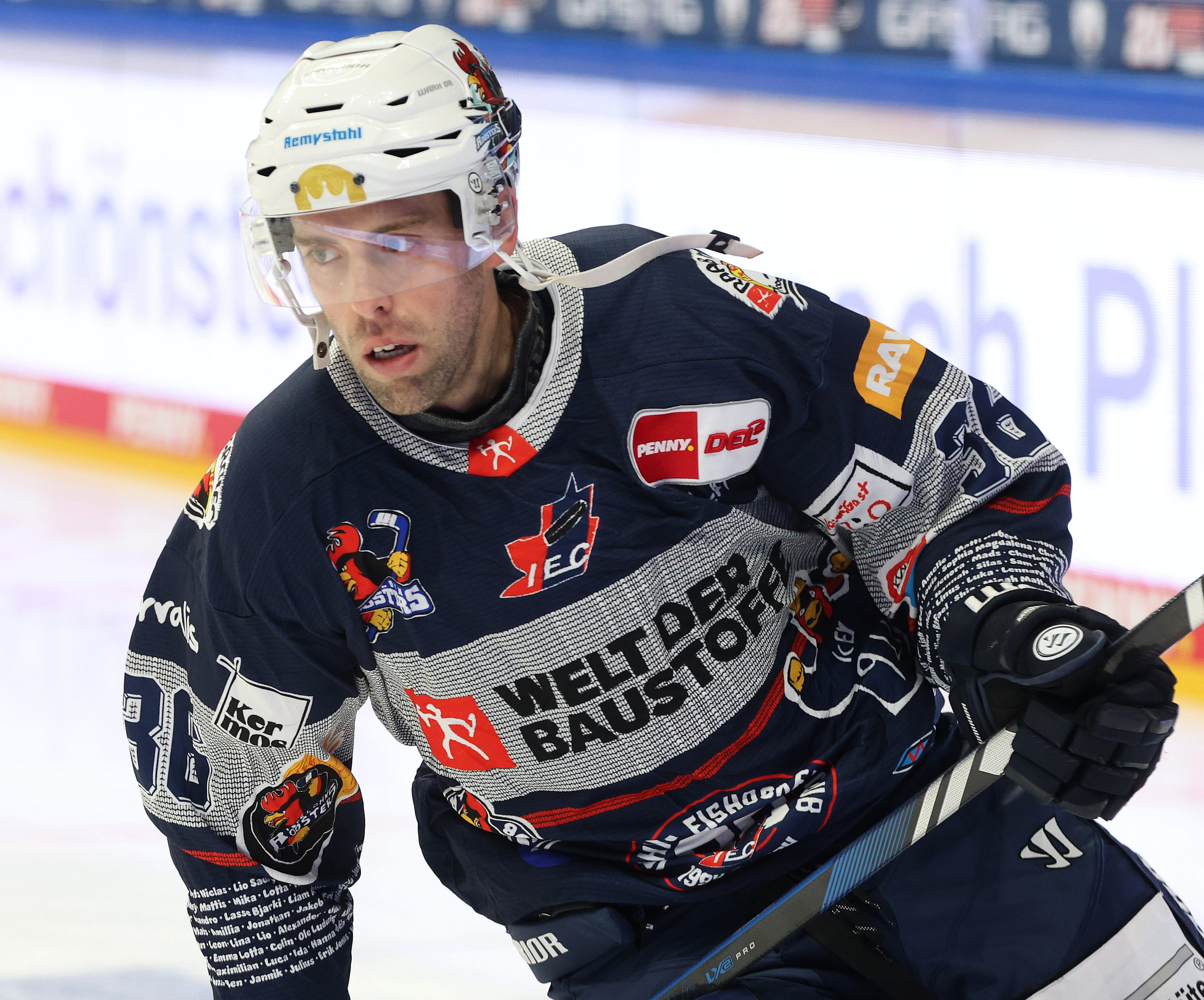
- Gormley with the Iserlohn Roosters in 2024
- Born: February 18, 1992 (age 34) Murray River, Prince Edward Island, Canada
- Height: 6 ft 2 in (188 cm)
- Weight: 196 lb (89 kg; 14 st 0 lb)
- Position: Defence
- Shot: Left
- Played for: Arizona Coyotes; Colorado Avalanche; Mora IK; TPS; Frölunda HC; Straubing Tigers; Dinamo Riga; Lokomotiv Yaroslavl; HC Sochi; Iserlohn Roosters
- National team: Canada
- NHL draft: 13th overall, 2010; Phoenix Coyotes
- Playing career: 2011–2025

Brandon Gormley (born February 18, 1992) is a Canadian former professional ice hockey defenceman. He was selected 13th overall by the Phoenix Coyotes in the 2010 NHL entry draft. During his junior career, he was named to the QMJHL All-Rookie Team, is a two-time QMJHL Second Team All-Star and won the President's Cup with the Wildcats in 2010. Internationally, he has competed in two World U-17 Hockey Challenges, one Ivan Hlinka Memorial Tournament and one IIHF World U20 Championship.

== Playing career ==
=== Junior ===
Gormley left his home in Prince Edward Island at the age of 14 to compete with the Athol Murray College of Notre Dame's hockey program in Wilcox, Saskatchewan. He played two years of midget hockey with the Notre Dame Hounds in the Saskatchewan Midget AAA Hockey League. In 2007–08, he scored 23 goals, and 53 points over 42 games as a 16-year-old, after which the Moncton Wildcats made him the first overall selection in the 2008 Quebec Major Junior Hockey League (QMJHL) Draft. He joined the Wildcats in 2008–09 and scored 7 goals and 27 points for Moncton in 62 games. His efforts earned him QMJHL All-Rookie Team honours.

He improved to 9 goals and 43 points for the Wildcats in 2009–10 and added 17 more points in the playoffs, the third-highest post-season total among league defencemen. Gormley and the Wildcats won the President's Cup as QMJHL champions, earning a berth in the 2010 Memorial Cup. He scored three points in three games in the national tournament, but the Wildcats lost all three games and were eliminated. Individually, he was voted the recipient of the Mike Bossy Trophy in 2010 as the Quebec League's top professional prospect. He was also named a Second-Team QMJHL All-Star.

Gormley finished the season highly rated for the 2010 NHL entry draft. The NHL Central Scouting Bureau listed him sixth among North American skaters, while the International Scouting Services listed him third among all skaters. Scouts described Gormley as "well rounded, but not dynamic" and praised his intelligence on the ice and ability to move the puck. Gormley went on to be selected 13th overall by the Phoenix Coyotes.

He attended his first NHL training camp in September 2010 before being returned to the Wildcats. Playing in his third QMJHL season, Gormley recorded 13 goals and 48 points over 47 games; he was named to the QMJHL Second All-Star Team for the second consecutive year. He added an assist over five post-season games as the Wildcats were eliminated in the first round of the QMJHL playoffs, failing to defend their league title. With his junior season over, the Coyotes assigned him to their American Hockey League (AHL) affiliate, the San Antonio Rampage. He played in four AHL games, recording an assist.

In his fourth season with the Wildcats, Gormley played 26 games before being traded to complete his junior career with the Shawinigan Cataractes hours before the January 7, 2012, QMJHL trade deadline.

=== Professional ===
Gormley was assigned to the Coyotes' new AHL affiliate, the Portland Pirates, to begin his first full professional season in 2012–13 season. He appeared in 68 games with the Pirates and ranked second among the blueline with 24 assists and 29 points.

In the second year of his entry-level contract, Gormley remained with the Pirates, quickly assuming leadership responsibilities to be selected as an Alternate Captain for the 2013–14 season. Gormley was used heavily in all situations with the Pirates and was placing 8th in the AHL in scoring amongst blueliners, before he received his first NHL recall by Phoenix on March 7, 2014. He made his NHL debut on March 10, 2014, against the Tampa Bay Lightning. Gormley featured in 5 games with the Coyotes going scoreless before he was returned to Portland to finish the season with new career offensive highs all across the board.

Approaching the final year of his rookie contract with the Coyotes, Gormley failed to establish a first-team position and was familiarly reassigned to the Portland Pirates to begin the 2014–15 season. During his first recall of the season to Arizona, Gormley scored his first NHL goal on November 16, 2014, against Ben Scrivens of the Edmonton Oilers. With the Coyotes languishing in the standings, Gormley was recalled on several occasions throughout the season, and although given opportunity failed to cement a regular position among the defense corps. He finished the season appearing in a career-high 27 games for 4 points.

On July 31, 2015, Gormley was re-signed by the Coyotes to a one-year, two-way contract. Unable to develop as the Coyotes had hoped and with his eligibility to waivers, Gormely was traded by Arizona to the Colorado Avalanche in exchange for the rights to restricted-free agent Stefan Elliott on September 9, 2015. Gormley made the Avalanche roster to begin the 2015–16 season, making his debut with Colorado in a 1–0 overtime defeat to the Carolina Hurricanes on October 21, 2015. Used in a depth role, Gormley recorded his first point with the Avs in his 22nd game, registering an assist in a 3–1 victory over the St. Louis Blues on December 13, 2015. Unable to secure a position on the blueline, Gormley was placed on waivers by the Avalanche on January 7, 2016. After going unclaimed, he was later assigned to former AHL club, the San Antonio Rampage, on January 13, 2016. Gormley remained with the Rampage until the season closed, and on June 27, 2016, he was not offered a new contract from the Avalanche, releasing him to free agency.

On July 28, 2016, Gormley was signed as a free agent to a one-year, two-way contract with the New Jersey Devils. In the 2016–17 season, Gormley cleared waivers and was assigned to add leadership to the blueline of AHL affiliate, the Albany Devils. Gormley contributed with 2 goals and 10 points in 35 games before he was traded by the New Jersey Devils to the Ottawa Senators for future considerations on March 6, 2017. Acquired to help out the AHL's Binghamton Senators, Gormley was dealt following the trade deadline, making him ineligible for a recall to Ottawa.

Having left the Senators familiarly as a free agent in the off-season, Gormley went un-signed over the summer. On September 25, 2017, he agreed to an AHL invite to attend the Toronto Marlies 2017 training camp. Following his release from the Marlies, Gormley opted to accept a European offer, signing a one-year deal with Swedish outfit, Mora IK of the SHL, on October 16, 2017.

After two seasons with Frölunda HC in the SHL, Gormley became a free agent. After going unsigned throughout the summer of 2020, he belatedly signed a contract with the Straubing Tigers of the Deutsche Eishockey Liga (DEL) on December 21, 2020. In the following 2020–21 season, Gormley increased his scoring output from the blueline in Germany, contributing with 3 goals and 17 points in 34 regular season games.

At the conclusion of his contract with Straubing, Gormley continued his journeyman career, signing a one-year contract with Latvian-based club, Dinamo Riga of the KHL, on August 19, 2021. In December, Dinamo traded him to Lokomotiv Yaroslavl, where he played out the remainder of the season, and contributing with 1 assist in three playoff contests.

As a free agent, Gormley opted to continue his tenure in the KHL by agreeing to a one-year contract with HC Sochi on August 15, 2022. Having concluded his contract with Sochi, Gormley left the club after a lone season and returned to the German DEL, in agreeing to a one-year contract with the Iserlohn Roosters on October 2, 2023.

Gormley started the 2024-25 season without a contract but, on October 18, 2024, he agreed to return to Iserlohn for another season.

== International play ==
Medal record

Representing Canada

Ice hockey

Ivan Hlinka Memorial Tournament
Gold medal – first place	2009 Slovakia	

World Junior Championships
Bronze medal – third place	2012 Canada	

Spengler Cup
Gold medal – first place	2016 Davos	

Gormley represented Atlantic Canada twice at the World U-17 Hockey Challenge. (Note: Canada sends five regional teams to the annual competition: Pacific, West, Quebec, Ontario and Atlantic) He scored six points over five games in back-to-back years in the 2008 and 2009 tournaments. He moved on to the national under-18 team for the 2009 Ivan Hlinka Memorial Tournament and scored three goals to help Canada win the gold medal.

Gormley participated in the Canadian national junior team's selection camp for the 2010 World Junior Ice Hockey Championships but failed to make the under-20 team as a 17-year-old. He was expected to participate in the 2011 tournament, but was sidelined with a knee injury. The following year, he was selected to the team for the 2012 World Juniors, held in Alberta. During the preliminary round, he was named Canada's player of the game after scoring two goals and an assist in a 10–2 win against Denmark. He was named the top defenseman of the tournament in addition to being named to the tournament All-Star team.

On January 25, 2022, Gormley was named to Team Canada for the 2022 Winter Olympics in Beijing.

== Career statistics ==
=== Regular season and playoffs ===
			Regular season					Playoffs
Season	Team	League	GP	G	A	Pts	PIM	GP	G	A	Pts	PIM
2007–08	Notre Dame Hounds AAA	SMHL	42	23	33	56	63	9	1	6	7	18
2008–09	Moncton Wildcats	QMJHL	62	7	20	27	34	10	1	3	4	6
2009–10	Moncton Wildcats	QMJHL	58	9	34	43	54	21	2	15	17	10
2010–11	Moncton Wildcats	QMJHL	47	13	35	48	42	5	0	1	1	6
2010–11	San Antonio Rampage	AHL	4	1	0	1	0	—	—	—	—	—
2011–12	Moncton Wildcats	QMJHL	26	10	17	27	18	—	—	—	—	—
2011–12	Shawinigan Cataractes	QMJHL	9	0	5	5	4	7	5	2	7	8
2012–13	Portland Pirates	AHL	68	5	24	29	44	3	1	2	3	0
2013–14	Portland Pirates	AHL	54	7	29	36	34	—	—	—	—	—
2013–14	Phoenix Coyotes	NHL	5	0	0	0	2	—	—	—	—	—
2014–15	Portland Pirates	AHL	23	3	7	10	18	5	1	4	5	2
2014–15	Arizona Coyotes	NHL	27	2	2	4	10	—	—	—	—	—
2015–16	Colorado Avalanche	NHL	26	0	1	1	8	—	—	—	—	—
2015–16	San Antonio Rampage	AHL	39	4	2	6	26	—	—	—	—	—
2016–17	Albany Devils	AHL	35	2	8	10	30	—	—	—	—	—
2016–17	Binghamton Senators	AHL	17	2	3	5	12	—	—	—	—	—
2017–18	Mora IK	SHL	41	2	15	17	30	—	—	—	—	—
2018–19	TPS	Liiga	24	2	6	8	8	—	—	—	—	—
2018–19	Frölunda HC	SHL	17	2	5	7	6	15	2	5	7	8
2019–20	Frölunda HC	SHL	42	5	6	11	26	—	—	—	—	—
2020–21	Straubing Tigers	DEL	34	3	14	17	16	3	0	3	3	4
2021–22	Dinamo Riga	KHL	26	1	10	11	22	—	—	—	—	—
2021–22	Lokomotiv Yaroslavl	KHL	2	0	0	0	0	3	0	1	1	4
2022–23	HC Sochi	KHL	43	1	11	12	47	—	—	—	—	—
2023–24	Iserlohn Roosters	DEL	31	2	9	11	36	—	—	—	—	—
2024–25	Iserlohn Roosters	DEL	38	4	14	18	12	—	—	—	—	—
NHL totals			58	2	3	5	20	—	—	—	—	—
SHL totals			100	9	26	35	62	15	2	5	7	8
KHL totals			71	2	21	23	69	3	0	1	1	4

=== International ===
Year	Team	Event	Result	GP	G	A	Pts	PIM
2008	Canada Atlantic	U17	8th	5	1	5	6	4
2009	Canada Atlantic	U17	9th	5	3	3	6	2
2009	Canada	IH18	1st place, gold medalist(s)	4	3	2	5	0
2012	Canada	WJC	3rd place, bronze medalist(s)	6	3	3	6	2
2016	Canada	SC	1st place, gold medalist(s)	5	1	3	4	2
Junior totals				20	9	14	23	8
Senior totals				5	1	3	4	2

== Awards and honours ==
Award	Year
CHL / QMJHL
All-Rookie Team	2008–09
Mike Bossy Trophy	2009–10
President's Cup (with the Moncton Wildcats)	2010
Second-Team All-Star	2009–10, 2010–11
CHL Memorial Cup All-Star Team	2012
CHL
Champions (Frölunda HC)	2019
SHL
Le Mat Trophy (Frölunda HC)	2019
International
Ivan Hlinka Memorial Tournament gold medal	2008
World Junior Ice Hockey Championships First Team All-Star	2012
World Junior Ice Hockey Championships Best defenseman	2012
World Junior Ice Hockey Championships Bronze Medal	2012

== Notes ==
Awards and achievements
Preceded by Oliver Ekman-Larsson	Phoenix Coyotes first-round draft pick 2010	Succeeded by Mark Visentin
