= 2009 Ivan Hlinka Memorial Tournament =

Tournament details
- Host countries: Czech Republic; Slovakia
- Venue(s): 2 (in 2 host cities)
- Dates: August 11–15, 2009
- Teams: 8

Final positions
- Champions: Canada (14th title)
- Runner-up: Russia
- Third place: Sweden
- Fourth place: United States

Tournament statistics
- Games played: 16
- Goals scored: 126 (7.88 per game)

The 2009 Ivan Hlinka Memorial Tournament was an under-18 ice hockey tournament held in Břeclav, Czech Republic and Piešťany, Slovakia from August 11–15, 2009. The two venues were Alcaplast Arena in Břeclav and Patrícia Ice Arena 37 in Piešťany. Canada captured their fifth championship in six years and fourteenth gold medal of the tournament overall, defeating Russia 9–2 in the gold medal game. Sweden defeated the United States by an identical 9–2 score to earn the bronze medal. The tournament marked the second straight year that Canada, Russia and Sweden medalled in that order.

== Preliminary round ==
=== Group A ===
Team	Pld	W	OTW	OTL	L	GF	GA	GD	Pts
Canada	3	3	0	0	0	18	5	+13	9
Sweden	3	2	0	0	1	11	6	+5	6
Czech Republic	3	1	0	0	2	3	13	−10	3
Switzerland	3	0	0	0	3	5	13	−8	0

=== Group B ===
Team	Pld	W	OTW	OTL	L	GF	GA	GD	Pts
Russia	3	3	0	0	0	19	8	+11	9
United States	3	2	0	0	1	13	12	+1	6
Slovakia	3	1	0	0	2	14	16	−2	3
Finland	3	0	0	0	3	8	18	−10	0

=== Final round ===
==== Seventh place game ====
August 15, 2009	Finland	1–5	Switzerland	Zimny Stadion

==== Fifth place game ====
August 15, 2009	Czech Republic	4–3	Slovakia	Zimny Stadion

==== Bronze medal game ====
August 15, 2009	United States	2–9	Sweden	Alcaplast Arena

==== Gold medal game ====
August 15, 2009	Russia	2–9	Canada	Alcaplast Arena

Kirill Kabanov (17:15); Stanislav Galiev (39:19) / Goals / Brandon Gormley (9:24); Jaden Schwartz (16:22); Brandon Gormley (31:24); Ryan Spooner (31:50); John McFarland (34:55); Tyler Seguin (36:56); Jeff Skinner (45:22); Jeff Skinner (49:17); John McFarland (55:42)

=== Final standings ===
Rk.	Team
1st place, gold medalist(s)	Canada
2nd place, silver medalist(s)	Russia
3rd place, bronze medalist(s)	Sweden
4.	United States
5.	Czech Republic
6.	Slovakia
7.	Switzerland
8.	Finland

== See also ==
- 2009 IIHF World U18 Championships
- 2009 World Junior Championships

Preceded by 2008 Ivan Hlinka Memorial Tournament	Ivan Hlinka Memorial Tournament; 2009	Succeeded by 2010 Ivan Hlinka Memorial Tournament
