= 2009 World U-17 Hockey Challenge =

Tournament details
- Host country: Canada
- Venue(s): Strathcona Gardens; Comox Valley Sports Center; Cowichan Valley Arena; Frank Crane Arena; Oceanside Place; Alberni Valley Multiplex (in 6 host cities)
- Dates: December 29 - January 4
- Teams: 10

Final positions
- Champions: Canada Ontario (7th title)

Tournament statistics
- Games played: 27
- Goals scored: 244 (9.04 per game)
- Scoring leader: (Canada) Ontario John McFarland (12 points)

The 2009 World U-17 Hockey Challenge was an international ice hockey tournament held in Campbell River, Courtenay, Duncan, Nanaimo, Parksville, and Port Alberni, British Columbia, Canada between December 29, 2008 and January 4, 2009. The venues used for the tournament included the Strathcona Gardens in Campbell River, the Comox Valley Sports Center in Courtenay, the Cowichan Valley Arena in Duncan, the Frank Crane Arena in Nanaimo, Oceanside Place in Parksville, and the Alberni Valley Multiplex in Port Alberni. Canada Ontario defeated Canada Pacific in the final to capture the gold medal for the second consecutive year, while the United States defeated Canada West to earn the bronze.

== Challenge results ==
=== Preliminary round ===
==== Group A ====
Team	Pld	W	OTW	OTL	L	GF	GA	GD	Pts
Canada Ontario	4	4	0	0	0	24	7	+17	12
Canada Pacific	4	3	0	0	1	17	15	+2	9
Russia	4	1	0	0	3	19	18	+1	3
Germany	4	1	0	0	3	12	19	−7	3
Canada Atlantic	4	1	0	0	3	12	25	−13	3

==== Group B ====
Team	Pld	W	OTW	OTL	L	GF	GA	GD	Pts
United States	4	4	0	0	0	29	5	+24	12
Canada West	4	3	0	0	1	17	14	+3	9
Canada Quebec	4	2	0	0	2	24	18	+6	6
Slovakia	4	1	0	0	3	16	27	−11	3
Finland	4	0	0	0	4	12	34	−22	0

=== Final round ===
Semifinals
A1	Canada Ontario	7
B2	Canada West	4
B1	United States	5
A2	Canada Pacific	6

Final
SF1	Canada Ontario	5
SF2	Canada Pacific	1

== Final standings ==
	Team
1st place, gold medalist(s)	Canada Ontario
2nd place, silver medalist(s)	Canada Pacific
3rd place, bronze medalist(s)	United States
4	Canada West
5	Canada Quebec
6	Germany
7	Russia
8	Slovakia
9	Canada Atlantic
10	Finland

== Tournament All-Star Team ==
- Goaltender: (Canada) Ontario J. P. Anderson
- Defencemen: (United States) Adam Clendening, (Canada) Atlantic Brandon Gormley
- Forwards: (Canada) Ontario John McFarland, (Canada) Quebec Guillaume Asselin, (United States) Brandon Saad

== See also ==
- 2009 World Junior Ice Hockey Championships
- 2009 IIHF World U18 Championships
