= 2013 Ivan Hlinka Memorial Tournament =

Tournament details
- Host countries: Slovakia; Czech Republic
- Venue(s): 2 (in 2 host cities)
- Dates: August 5–10, 2013
- Teams: 8

Final positions
- Champions: Canada
- Runner-up: United States
- Third place: Czech Republic
- Fourth place: Russia

Tournament statistics
- Games played: 18
- Goals scored: 113 (6.28 per game)
- Scoring leader(s): (Canada) Spencer Watson (4 goals, 6 assists)

Official website
- hlinkamemorial.com/eng/index.asp

The 2013 Ivan Hlinka Memorial Tournament is an under-18 ice hockey tournament held in Břeclav, Czech Republic and Piešťany, Slovakia from August 5–10, 2013. As in the previous three years, the venues were Alcaplast Arena in Břeclav and Easton Arena in Piešťany.

== Preliminary round ==
All times are Central European Summer Time (UTC+2).

=== Group A ===
Pos	Team	Pld	W	OTW	OTL	L	GF	GA	GD	Pts	Qualification
1	Canada	3	1	1	0	1	11	7	+4	5	Semifinals
2	Czech Republic (H)	3	1	1	0	1	9	9	0	5	Semifinals
3	Switzerland	3	1	0	2	0	9	10	−1	5	Fifth place game
4	Sweden	3	1	0	0	2	8	11	−3	3	Seventh place game

(H) Host

5 August 2013; 15:30	Switzerland	3–2 (0–1, 2–1, 1–0)	Sweden	Alcaplast Arena

Game reference
Gauthier Descloux	Goalies	Jesper Eriksson
39	Shots	33

5 August 2013; 19:00	Czech Republic	0–4 (0–2, 0–1, 0–1)	Canada	Alcaplast Arena; Attendance: 1300

Game reference
Vítek Vaněček	Goalies	Julio Billia

6 August 2013; 15:30	Sweden	4–3	Canada	Alcaplast Arena

6 August 2013; 19:00	Czech Republic	4–3 SO	Switzerland	Alcaplast Arena

7 August 2013; 15:30	Canada	4–3 SO	Switzerland	Alcaplast Arena

7 August 2013; 19:00	Czech Republic	5–2	Sweden	Alcaplast Arena

=== Group B ===
Pos	Team	Pld	W	OTW	OTL	L	GF	GA	GD	Pts	Qualification
1	United States	3	2	0	1	0	11	7	+4	7	Semifinals
2	Russia	3	2	0	0	1	11	8	+3	6	Semifinals
3	Finland	3	1	1	0	1	11	10	+1	5	Fifth place game
4	Slovakia (H)	3	0	0	0	3	4	12	−8	0	Seventh place game

(H) Host

5 August 2013; 14:00	Finland	3–2 OT (0–1, 1–0, 1–1) 1–0	United States	Easton Arena

Game reference
Kaapo Kähkönen	Goalies	Alex Nedeljkovic

5 August 2013; 17:30	Slovakia	1–2 (0–0, 1–2, 0–0)	Russia	Easton Arena; Attendance: 513

Game reference
Maximillian Pajpach	Goalies	Sergei Korobov

6 August 2013; 14:00	United States	4–2	Russia	Easton Arena

6 August 2013; 17:30	Slovakia	1–5	Finland	Easton Arena

7 August 2013; 14:00	Russia	7–3	Finland	Easton Arena

7 August 2013; 17:30	Slovakia	2–5	United States	Easton Arena

== Final round ==
=== Seventh place game ===
9 August 2013	Sweden	11–0 (3–0, 6–0, 2–0)	Slovakia	Easton Arena, Piešťany; Attendance: 483

=== Fifth place game ===
9 August 2013	Finland	4–3 SO	Switzerland	Alcaplast Arena; Attendance: 150

=== Semifinals ===
9 August 2013	Canada	3–1	Russia	Easton Arena, Piešťany; Attendance: 237

9 August 2013	United States	5–3	Czech Republic	Alcaplast Arena; Attendance: 1500

=== Bronze medal game ===
10 August 2013	Czech Republic	3–2	Russia	Alcaplast Arena; Attendance: 895

=== Gold medal game ===
10 August 2013	Canada	4–0	United States	Easton Arena, Piešťany; Attendance: 553

=== Final standings ===
Rank	Team
1st place, gold medalist(s)	Canada
2nd place, silver medalist(s)	United States
3rd place, bronze medalist(s)	Czech Republic
4	Russia
5	Finland
6	Switzerland
7	Sweden
8	Slovakia

== See also ==
- 2013 IIHF World U18 Championships
- 2013 World Junior Championships

Preceded by 2012 Ivan Hlinka Memorial Tournament	Ivan Hlinka Memorial Tournament; 2013	Succeeded by 2014 Ivan Hlinka Memorial Tournament
