= Bryan McCabe =

Canadian ice hockey player (born 1975)

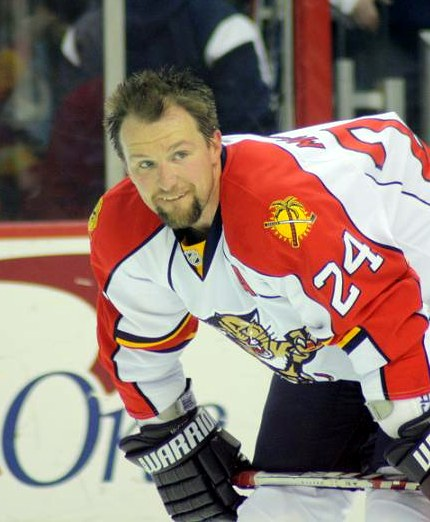
- McCabe with the Florida Panthers in 2009
- Born: June 8, 1975 (age 51) St. Catharines, Ontario, Canada
- Height: 6 ft 2 in (188 cm)
- Weight: 223 lb (101 kg; 15 st 13 lb)
- Position: Defence
- Shot: Left
- Played for: New York Islanders; Vancouver Canucks; Chicago Blackhawks; Toronto Maple Leafs; HV71; Florida Panthers; New York Rangers
- National team: Canada
- NHL draft: 40th overall, 1993; New York Islanders
- Playing career: 1995–2011

Bryan McCabe (born June 8, 1975) is a Canadian former professional ice hockey defenceman who played in over 1,000 games in the National Hockey League (NHL) playing for the New York Islanders, Vancouver Canucks, Chicago Blackhawks, Toronto Maple Leafs, Florida Panthers and New York Rangers.

McCabe moved to Calgary, Alberta, at a young age and spent most of his minor hockey career playing in the Calgary area. Drafted out of the Western Hockey League (WHL) 40th overall by the New York Islanders in 1993, McCabe competed in the 1995 Memorial Cup and was named to back-to-back WHL first All-Star teams during his major junior career. He began his NHL career with the Islanders before stints with the Vancouver Canucks and Chicago Blackhawks. In 2000–01, McCabe began a seven-season tenure with the Toronto Maple Leafs, where he played most of his career.

Internationally, McCabe competed for Canada, winning gold medals at the 1997 World Championships, 1994 and 1995 World Junior Championships and the 1992 Pacific Cup. He is also a one-time Olympian, representing Canada at the 2006 Winter Olympics in Turin.

== Playing career ==
McCabe began playing junior hockey with the Medicine Hat Tigers of the Western Hockey League (WHL) in 1991–92. After one and a half seasons in Medicine Hat, he was traded to the Spokane Chiefs. He completed the 1992–93 season with 60 points in 60 games split between the Tigers and Chiefs. That summer, he was drafted 40th overall by the New York Islanders in the second round of the 1993 NHL entry draft.

Once drafted, he returned to the Chiefs in 1993–94 and put up a junior career-high 84 points in 64 games. In his fourth and final year of junior, he was traded to the Brandon Wheat Kings for the remaining 20 games of the 1994–95 season. He put up a total of 69 points in 62 games and was chosen as a first-team WHL All-Star.

In 1995–96, McCabe began his NHL career with the Islanders. He recorded 23 points in his rookie season before being traded to the Vancouver Canucks midway through his third year (along with Todd Bertuzzi and a third-round draft pick in 1998, used to select Jarkko Ruutu) in exchange for Trevor Linden. He played one-and-a-half seasons with the Canucks before being traded to the Chicago Blackhawks on the day of the 1999 NHL entry draft in a bid by Canucks general manager Brian Burke to draft Daniel and Henrik Sedin second and third overall, respectively. McCabe was packaged with Vancouver's first-round draft pick in 2000 in exchange for Chicago's first-round pick in 1999.

On October 2, 2000, after a 6-goal, 25-point campaign with the Blackhawks in 1999–2000, McCabe was traded once again to the Toronto Maple Leafs in exchange for Alexander Karpovtsev and a fourth-round pick (Vladimir Gusev) in the 2001 NHL entry draft. McCabe found his stride in Toronto and built on a 17-goal, 43-point breakout season in 2001–02 with 53 points two seasons later, culminating in a fourth-place finish in James Norris Memorial Trophy voting Second Team All-Star honours.

As NHL play was suspended due to the 2004–05 lockout, McCabe signed with HV71 of the Swedish Elitserien. He struggled with HV71 and exercised an escape clause in his contract before a game against Södertälje SK, where he was scheduled to be a healthy scratch. He had one goal, no assists, 30 penalty minutes and a –12 rating over ten games.

When NHL play resumed the following season, McCabe emerged with a career-high 19 goals, 49 assists and 68 points in 73 games with the Maple Leafs. He finished the season third overall in points among NHL defencemen, behind Nicklas Lidström and Sergei Zubov. Near the beginning of the season, McCabe was recognized as the NHL's Offensive Player of the Week for November 13–19, 2005, and was later named as a reserve on Team Canada's 2006 Winter Olympic team in Turin.

Following McCabe's career year, on June 28, 2006, he signed a five-year, $28.75 million contract extension with Toronto that included a no-movement clause. He scored 57 points in 82 games the following season.

In the dying seconds of overtime against the Buffalo Sabres on October 15, 2007, McCabe scored in his own net; the goal was credited to Paul Gaustad. McCabe was the focus of numerous trade rumours during the 2007–08 season, and on September 2, 2008, he was ultimately traded to the Florida Panthers (along with a fourth-round draft pick in the 2010 NHL entry draft) in exchange for defenceman Mike Van Ryn.

McCabe was named team captain of the Florida Panthers on September 23, 2009, and on November 6, 2009, he played in his 1,000th game in the NHL.

On February 26, 2011, McCabe was traded to the New York Rangers in exchange for forward Tim Kennedy and a third-round draft pick.

McCabe announced his retirement from the NHL on February 15, 2012.

== International play ==
While in junior, McCabe was a member of three gold medal-winning Canadian teams, the first of which was at the 1992 Pacific Cup in Japan. The under-18 tournament was in just its second year of what is now known as the Ivan Hlinka Memorial Tournament. at the 1994 and 1995 World Junior Championships. In 1995, he was named to the tournament All-Star team and was honoured as Best Defenceman after posting 12 points in 7 games.

After joining the NHL, McCabe appeared in three consecutive World Championships, in 1997, 1998, and 1999, capturing gold in 1997.

On December 21, 2005, McCabe was named as a reserve for Canada at the 2006 Winter Olympics in Turin. On February 2, 2006, he was moved from the reserves to the official roster to replace an injured Ed Jovanovski. Canada would fail to defend its 2002 Olympic gold medal and was eliminated by Russia in the quarter-finals.

== Post-playing career ==
After retiring from the NHL in 2012, McCabe was hired as a development coach with the Florida Panthers; a year later, he was named Director of Player Development.

In 2017, McCabe was made Director of Player Personnel with the Florida Panthers. He won his first championship ring when the Panthers won the Stanley Cup in 2024. In late July 2026, McCabe and the Panthers parted ways.

On September 16, 2026, the New Jersey Devils announced that they had hired McCabe as the vice president of prospect personnel.

== Career statistics ==
=== Regular season and playoffs ===
			Regular season					Playoffs
Season	Team	League	GP	G	A	Pts	PIM	GP	G	A	Pts	PIM
1990–91	Calgary Canucks AAA	AMHL	33	14	34	48	55	—	—	—	—	—
1991–92	Medicine Hat Tigers	WHL	68	6	24	30	157	4	0	0	0	6
1992–93	Medicine Hat Tigers	WHL	14	0	13	13	83	—	—	—	—	—
1992–93	Spokane Chiefs	WHL	46	3	44	47	134	6	1	5	6	28
1993–94	Spokane Chiefs	WHL	64	22	62	84	218	3	0	4	4	4
1994–95	Spokane Chiefs	WHL	42	14	39	53	115	—	—	—	—	—
1994–95	Brandon Wheat Kings	WHL	20	6	10	16	38	18	4	13	17	59
1995–96	New York Islanders	NHL	82	7	16	23	156	—	—	—	—	—
1996–97	New York Islanders	NHL	82	8	20	28	165	—	—	—	—	—
1997–98	New York Islanders	NHL	56	3	9	12	145	—	—	—	—	—
1997–98	Vancouver Canucks	NHL	26	1	11	12	64	—	—	—	—	—
1998–99	Vancouver Canucks	NHL	69	7	14	21	120	—	—	—	—	—
1999–2000	Chicago Blackhawks	NHL	79	6	19	25	139	—	—	—	—	—
2000–01	Toronto Maple Leafs	NHL	82	5	24	29	123	11	2	3	5	16
2001–02	Toronto Maple Leafs	NHL	82	17	26	43	129	20	5	5	10	30
2002–03	Toronto Maple Leafs	NHL	75	6	18	24	135	7	0	3	3	10
2003–04	Toronto Maple Leafs	NHL	75	16	37	53	86	13	3	5	8	14
2004–05	HV71	SEL	10	1	0	1	30	—	—	—	—	—
2005–06	Toronto Maple Leafs	NHL	73	19	49	68	116	—	—	—	—	—
2006–07	Toronto Maple Leafs	NHL	82	15	42	57	115	—	—	—	—	—
2007–08	Toronto Maple Leafs	NHL	54	5	18	23	81	—	—	—	—	—
2008–09	Florida Panthers	NHL	69	15	24	39	41	—	—	—	—	—
2009–10	Florida Panthers	NHL	82	8	35	43	83	—	—	—	—	—
2010–11	Florida Panthers	NHL	48	5	17	22	28	—	—	—	—	—
2010–11	New York Rangers	NHL	19	2	4	6	6	5	0	2	2	14
NHL totals			1,135	145	383	528	1,732	56	10	18	28	84

=== International ===
Medal record

Representing Canada

Men's ice hockey

World Championships
Gold medal – first place	1997 Finland	

World Junior Championships
Gold medal – first place	1995 Canada	
Gold medal – first place	1994 Czech Republic	

Pacific Cup
Gold medal – first place	1992 Japan	

Year	Team	Event	Result	GP	G	A	Pts	PIM
1992	Canada	PC	1st place, gold medalist(s)	3	1	1	2	4
1994	Canada	WJC	1st place, gold medalist(s)	7	0	0	0	6
1995	Canada	WJC	1st place, gold medalist(s)	7	3	9	12	4
1997	Canada	WC	1st place, gold medalist(s)	11	0	2	2	10
1998	Canada	WC	6th	6	1	2	3	4
1999	Canada	WC	4th	10	1	3	4	10
2006	Canada	OG	7th	6	0	0	0	18
Junior totals				17	4	10	14	14
Senior totals				33	2	7	9	42

== Awards and achievements ==
WHL

- West second All-Star team – 1993
- West first All-Star team – 1994
- East first All-Star team – 1995
- Memorial Cup All-Star team – 1995

International

- World Junior All-Star team – 1995
- World Junior Best Defenceman - 1995

NHL

- Offensive Player of the Week - November 13–19, 2005
- Second All-Star team – 2004
- Stanley Cup champion (as executive) — 2024, 2025

== Personal life ==
McCabe met his wife, Roberta, a native of Long Island, during his stint with the New York Islanders. Together they have two daughters, Stevie and Jocelyn, and a son, Linkin. They live in Delray Beach, Florida and the family also has a home on Long Island.

Sporting positions
Preceded by Patrick Flatley	New York Islanders captain 1997–98	Succeeded by Trevor Linden
Preceded by Olli Jokinen	Florida Panthers captain 2009–11	Succeeded by Ed Jovanovski
