= IIHF World U18 Championship =

Men's national under-18 ice hockey tournament

IIHF World U18 Championships
- Upcoming season or competition: 2027 IIHF World U18 Championships
- Sport: Ice hockey
- First season: 1999
- No. of teams: 10
- Most recent champions: Sweden (3rd title)
- Most titles: United States (11 titles)
- Relegation to: Division I
- Website: IIHF.com

The IIHF U18 World Championship is an annual event organized by the International Ice Hockey Federation for national under-18 ice hockey teams from around the world. The tournament is usually played in April and is organized according to a system similar to the Ice Hockey World Championships and the IIHF World Junior Championship. The tournament was first held in 1999.

== History ==
The United States leads the tournament with eleven championships followed by Canada with six championships, Finland with four, Russia with three, and Sweden with two. Players who do not participate in the World Championship due to their respective league postseasons have the alternative of representing their country in the non-IIHF Hlinka Gretzky Cup in August.

== Results ==
- (#) Number of tournaments placing in a particular top-four position at the time.

Year	(gold) Gold	(silver) Silver	(bronze) Bronze	4th place	Host city (cities)	Host country
1999	Finland (1)	Sweden (1)	Slovakia (1)	Switzerland (1)	Füssen and Kaufbeuren	Germany
2000	Finland (2)	Russia (1)	Sweden (1)	Switzerland (2)	Kloten and Weinfelden	Switzerland
2001	Russia (1)	Switzerland (1)	Finland (1)	Czech Republic (1)	Helsinki, Lahti and Heinola	Finland
2002	United States (1)	Russia (2)	Czech Republic (1)	Finland (1)	Piešťany and Trnava	Slovakia
2003	Canada (1)	Slovakia (1)	Russia (1)	United States (1)	Yaroslavl	Russia
2004	Russia (2)	United States (1)	Czech Republic (2)	Canada (1)	Minsk	Belarus
2005	United States (2)	Canada (1)	Sweden (2)	Czech Republic (2)	Plzeň and České Budějovice	Czech Republic
2006	United States (3)	Finland (1)	Czech Republic (3)	Canada (2)	Ängelholm and Halmstad	Sweden
2007	Russia (3)	United States (2)	Sweden (3)	Canada (3)	Tampere and Rauma	Finland
2008	Canada (2)	Russia (3)	United States (1)	Sweden (1)	Kazan	Russia
2009	United States (4)	Russia (4)	Finland (2)	Canada (4)	Fargo and Moorhead	United States
2010	United States (5)	Sweden (2)	Finland (3)	Russia (1)	Minsk and Babruysk	Belarus
2011	United States (6)	Sweden (3)	Russia (2)	Canada (5)	Crimmitschau and Dresden	Germany
2012	United States (7)	Sweden (4)	Canada (1)	Finland (2)	Brno, Znojmo and Břeclav	Czech Republic
2013	Canada (3)	United States (3)	Finland (4)	Russia (2)	Sochi	Russia
2014	United States (8)	Czech Republic (1)	Canada (2)	Sweden (2)	Lappeenranta and Imatra	Finland
2015	United States (9)	Finland (2)	Canada (3)	Switzerland (3)	Zug and Lucerne	Switzerland
2016	Finland (3)	Sweden (5)	United States (2)	Canada (6)	Grand Forks	United States
2017	United States (10)	Finland (3)	Russia (3)	Sweden (3)	Poprad and Spišská Nová Ves	Slovakia
2018	Finland (4)	United States (4)	Sweden (4)	Czech Republic (3)	Chelyabinsk and Magnitogorsk	Russia
2019	Sweden (1)	Russia (5)	United States (3)	Canada (7)	Örnsköldsvik and Umeå	Sweden
2020	Competition cancelled due to the COVID-19 pandemic				Plymouth and Ann Arbor, United States	United States
2021	Canada (4)	Russia (6)	Sweden (5)	Finland (3)	Plano and Frisco	United States
2022	Sweden (2)	United States (5)	Finland (5)	Czech Republic (4)	Landshut and Kaufbeuren	Germany
2023	United States (11)	Sweden (6)	Canada (4)	Slovakia (1)	Basel and Porrentruy	Switzerland
2024	Canada (5)	United States (6)	Sweden (6)	Slovakia (2)	Espoo and Vantaa	Finland
2025	Canada (6)	Sweden (7)	United States (4)	Slovakia (3)	Frisco and Allen	United States
2026	Sweden (3)	Slovakia (2)	Czechia (4)	Latvia (1)	Trenčín and Bratislava	Slovakia
2027					Duluth	United States
2028					TBD	
2029					TBD	United States

=== Medal table ===
Rank	Nation	Gold	Silver	Bronze	Total
1	United States	11	6	4	21
2	Canada	6	1	4	11
3	Finland	4	3	5	12
4	Sweden	3	7	6	16
5	Russia	3	6	3	12
6	Slovakia	0	2	1	3
7	Czechia	0	1	4	5
8	Switzerland	0	1	0	1
Totals (8 entries)		27	27	27	81

== Hosting countries ==
Host country	Tournaments
Finland	4
Russia	4
United States	4
Germany	3
Slovakia	3
Switzerland	3
Belarus	2
Czechia	2
Sweden	2

== See also ==
- IIHF World Ranking
- Ice Hockey World Championships
- IIHF World Junior Championship
- World Junior A Challenge
- World U-17 Hockey Challenge
