= 2001 IIHF World U18 Championships =

2001 IIHF World U18 Championship

Tournament details
- Host country: Finland
- Venues: 3 (in 3 host cities)
- Dates: April 12–22, 2001
- Teams: 10

Final positions
- Champions: Russia (1st title)
- Runners-up: Switzerland
- Third place: Finland
- Fourth place: Czech Republic

Tournament statistics
- Games played: 31
- Goals scored: 226 (7.29 per game)
- Attendance: 26,594 (858 per game)
- Scoring leader: (Russia) Ilya Kovalchuk (15 points)

The 2001 IIHF World U18 Championships were held in Heinola, Helsinki, and Lahti, Finland. The championships ran between April 12 and April 22, 2001. Games were played at the Heinolan Jäähalli in Heinola, the Helsinki Ice Hall in Helsinki, and the Lahden Jäähalli in Lahti. Russia defeated Switzerland 6–2 in the final to win the gold medal, with Finland defeating the Czech Republic 2–1 to capture the bronze medal.

== Championship results ==
=== Preliminary round ===
==== Group A ====
Pos	Team	Pld	W	L	D	GF	GA	GD	Pts
1	Finland	4	4	0	0	17	3	+14	8
2	United States	4	3	1	0	23	7	+16	6
3	Switzerland	4	2	2	0	12	10	+2	4
4	Slovakia	4	1	3	0	14	15	−1	2
5	Ukraine	4	0	4	0	3	34	−31	0

Source: IIHF

===== Results =====
April 12, 2001	Ukraine	2–6	Switzerland	Lahden Jäähalli, Lahti; Attendance: 312

April 12, 2001	Slovakia	0–3	Finland	Lahden Jäähalli, Lahti; Attendance: 846

April 13, 2001	United States	11–0	Ukraine	Lahden Jäähalli, Lahti; Attendance: 397

April 14, 2001	Switzerland	5–2	Slovakia	Lahden Jäähalli, Lahti; Attendance: 634

April 14, 2001	Finland	4–3	United States	Lahden Jäähalli, Lahti; Attendance: 2,012

April 15, 2001	Ukraine	0–7	Finland	Lahden Jäähalli, Lahti; Attendance: 1,316

April 16, 2001	Switzerland	1–3	United States	Lahden Jäähalli, Lahti; Attendance: 338

April 16, 2001	Slovakia	10–1	Ukraine	Lahden Jäähalli, Lahti; Attendance: 300

April 17, 2001	United States	6–2	Slovakia	Lahden Jäähalli, Lahti; Attendance: 300

April 17, 2001	Finland	3–0	Switzerland	Lahden Jäähalli, Lahti; Attendance: 2,037

==== Group B ====
Pos	Team	Pld	W	L	D	GF	GA	GD	Pts
1	Russia	4	3	1	0	29	11	+18	6
2	Germany	4	2	1	1	10	12	−2	5
3	Czech Republic	4	2	2	0	13	14	−1	4
4	Sweden	4	2	2	0	10	10	0	4
5	Norway	4	0	3	1	8	23	−15	1

Source: IIHF

===== Results =====
April 12, 2001	Czech Republic	3–8	Russia	Heinolan Jäähalli, Heinola; Attendance: 613

April 12, 2001	Norway	3–4	Sweden	Heinolan Jäähalli, Heinola; Attendance: 498

April 13, 2001	Germany	2–2	Norway	Heinolan Jäähalli, Heinola; Attendance: 616

April 14, 2001	Sweden	1–2	Czech Republic	Heinolan Jäähalli, Heinola; Attendance: 537

April 14, 2001	Russia	8–3	Germany	Heinolan Jäähalli, Heinola; Attendance: 416

April 15, 2001	Norway	1–10	Russia	Heinolan Jäähalli, Heinola; Attendance: 550

April 16, 2001	Sweden	1–2	Germany	Heinolan Jäähalli, Heinola; Attendance: 540

April 16, 2001	Czech Republic	7–2	Norway	Heinolan Jäähalli, Heinola; Attendance: 570

April 17, 2001	Russia	3–4	Sweden	Heinolan Jäähalli, Heinola; Attendance: 640

April 17, 2001	Germany	3–1	Czech Republic	Heinolan Jäähalli, Heinola; Attendance: 525

=== Relegation Round ===
Pos	Team	Pld	W	L	D	GF	GA	GD	Pts
1	Sweden	3	3	0	0	18	8	+10	6
2	Slovakia	3	1	1	1	15	10	+5	3
3	Norway	3	1	1	1	12	10	+2	3
4	Ukraine	3	0	3	0	7	24	−17	0

Source: IIHF

Note: The following matches from the preliminary round carry forward to the relegation round:

- April 12, 2001: Norway 3-4 Sweden
- April 16, 2001: Slovakia 10-1 Ukraine

Ukraine was relegated. However with Canada entering the tournament for 2002, Ukraine was re-instated to top level as the tournament was expanded to 12 teams for a year.

==== Results ====
April 19, 2001	Slovakia	4–4	Norway	Heinolan Jäähalli, Heinola; Attendance: 340

April 19, 2001	Sweden	9–4	Ukraine	Heinolan Jäähalli, Heinola; Attendance: 410

April 20, 2001	Sweden	5–1	Slovakia	Heinolan Jäähalli, Heinola; Attendance: 325

April 20, 2001	Norway	5–2	Ukraine	Heinolan Jäähalli, Heinola; Attendance: 300

=== Final round ===
Quarterfinals
A2	United States	4
B3	Czech Republic	5
B2	Germany	1
A3	Switzerland	7

Semifinals
B1	Russia	8
QF1	Czech Republic	3
A1	Finland	2
QF2	Switzerland	4

Final
SF1	Russia	6
SF2	Switzerland	2

==== Quarterfinals ====
April 19, 2001	Germany	1–7	Switzerland	Lahden Jäähalli, Lahti; Attendance: 329

April 19, 2001	United States	4–5 (SO)	Czech Republic	Lahden Jäähalli, Lahti; Attendance: 519

==== Semifinals ====
April 20, 2001	Russia	8–3	Czech Republic	Helsinki Ice Hall, Helsinki; Attendance: 2,152

April 20, 2001	Switzerland	4–2	Finland	Helsinki Ice Hall, Helsinki; Attendance: 2,811

==== Fifth place game ====
April 22, 2001	United States	1–2	Germany	Heinolan Jäähalli, Heinola; Attendance: 335

==== Bronze medal game ====
April 22, 2001	Finland	2–1	Czech Republic	Helsinki Ice Hall, Helsinki

==== Gold medal game ====
April 22, 2001	Russia	6–2	Switzerland	Helsinki Ice Hall, Helsinki; Attendance: 5,076

=== Final standings ===
Rk.	Team
1st place, gold medalist(s)	Russia
2nd place, silver medalist(s)	Switzerland
3rd place, bronze medalist(s)	Finland
4	Czech Republic
5	Germany
6	United States
7	Sweden
8	Slovakia
9	Norway
10	Ukraine

Ukraine were supposed to be relegated to Division I for the 2002 IIHF World U18 Championships, however with the late addition of Canada it was decided to temporarily expand the tournament to twelve teams.

=== Scoring leaders ===
Player	Country	GP	G	A	Pts	PIM
Ilya Kovalchuk	Russia	6	11	4	15	26
Igor Grigorenko	Russia	6	6	4	10	8
Yuri Trubachev	Russia	6	2	7	9	8
Tomas Jasko	Slovakia	6	4	4	8	0
Dwight Helminen	United States	6	3	5	8	0
Petr Kanko	Czech Republic	7	6	1	7	4
Joey Crabb	United States	6	5	2	7	2
Patrik Bärtschi	Switzerland	7	5	2	7	4
Alexander Perezhogin	Russia	6	4	3	7	0
Jiří Novotný	Czech Republic	6	4	3	7	2

=== Goaltending leaders ===
(Minimum 60 minutes played)

Player	Country	MINS	GA	Sv%	GAA	SO
Tuomas Nissinen	Finland	120:00	1	.974	0.50	1
Yuri Klyuchnikov	Russia	72:47	2	.882	1.65	0
Kari Lehtonen	Finland	239:10	7	.935	1.76	2
Michal Zajkowski	Sweden	120:00	4	.944	2.00	0
Travis Weber	United States	180:00	6	.924	2.00	1

== Division I ==
=== First round ===
Group A (in Riga)
Pos	Team	Pld	W	D	L	GF	GA	GD	Pts	BLR	JPN	DAN	PRK
1	Belarus	3	3	0	0	23	8	+15	6		3–2	11–5	9–1
2	Japan	3	2	0	1	17	7	+10	4	2–3		4–2	11–2
3	Denmark	3	1	0	2	12	19	−7	2	5–11	2–4		5–4
4	North Korea	3	0	0	3	7	25	−18	0	1–9	2–11	4–5	

Source: IIHF

Group B (in Liepaja)
Pos	Team	Pld	W	D	L	GF	GA	GD	Pts	AUT	LAT	KAZ	ITA
1	Austria	3	2	1	0	10	5	+5	5		3–0	5–3	2–2
2	Latvia	3	1	1	1	13	9	+4	3	0–3		5–5	8–1
3	Kazakhstan	3	1	1	1	12	10	+2	3	3–5	5–5		4–0
4	Italy	3	0	1	2	3	14	−11	1	2–2	1–8	0–4	

Source: IIHF

=== Final round ===
5th-8th place
Pos	Team	Pld	W	D	L	GF	GA	GD	Pts	KAZ	ITA	DAN	PRK
1	Kazakhstan	3	3	0	0	24	4	+20	6		(4–0)	8–2	12–2
2	Italy	3	2	0	1	11	12	−1	4	(0–4)		6–5	5–3
3	Denmark	3	1	0	2	12	18	−6	2	2–8	5–6		(5–4)
4	North Korea	3	0	0	3	9	22	−13	0	2–12	3–5	(4–5)	

Source: IIHF

1st-4th place
Pos	Team	Pld	W	D	L	GF	GA	GD	Pts	BLR	AUT	JPN	LAT
1	Belarus	3	2	1	0	14	9	+5	5		4–4	(3–2)	7–3
2	Austria	3	1	2	0	10	7	+3	4	4–4		3–3	(3–0)
3	Japan	3	1	1	1	10	8	+2	3	(2–3)	3–3		5–2
4	Latvia	3	0	0	3	5	15	−10	0	3–7	(0–3)	2–5	

Source: IIHF

Belarus were promoted to the top level, and North Korea were relegated to Division II for the 2002 IIHF World U18 Championships.

== Division II ==
=== First round ===
Group A (in Kaunas)
Pos	Team	Pld	W	D	L	GF	GA	GD	Pts	SLO	POL	CRO	HUN
1	Slovenia	3	3	0	0	31	2	+29	6		10–1	11–0	10–1
2	Poland	3	2	0	1	24	11	+13	4	1–10		10–1	13–0
3	Croatia	3	1	0	2	8	27	−19	2	0–11	1–10		7–6
4	Hungary	3	0	0	3	7	30	−23	0	1–10	0–13	6–7	

Source: IIHF

Group B (in Elektrėnai)
Pos	Team	Pld	W	D	L	GF	GA	GD	Pts	FRA	EST	GBR	LTU
1	France	3	2	1	0	21	4	+17	5		4–4	9–0	8–0
2	Estonia	3	2	1	0	16	8	+8	5	4–4		6–2	6–2
3	Great Britain	3	1	0	2	10	18	−8	2	0–9	2–6		8–3
4	Lithuania	3	0	0	3	5	22	−17	0	0–8	2–6	3–8	

Source: IIHF

=== Finals ===
7th place
31 March 2001	Kaunas	Lithuania	–	Hungary	1:11 (0:3,1:1,0:7)
5th place
31 March 2001	Kaunas	Great Britain	–	Croatia	5:4 (0:1,1:1,4:2)
3rd place
31 March 2001	Elektrėnai	Poland	–	Estonia	4:2 (1:1,0:0,3:1)
Final
31 March 2001	Elektrėnai	Slovenia	–	France	5:2 (1:1,4:0,0:1)

Slovenia were promoted to the Division I, and Lithuania were relegated to Division III for the 2002 IIHF World U18 Championships.

== Division III ==
=== First round ===
Group A
Pos	Team	Pld	W	D	L	GF	GA	GD	Pts	ROM	RSA	BEL	YUG
1	Romania	3	3	0	0	16	2	+14	6		10–0	5–2	1–0
2	South Africa	3	2	0	1	7	15	−8	4	0–10		3–2	4–3
3	Belgium	3	1	0	2	8	9	−1	2	2–5	2–3		4–1
4	Yugoslavia	3	0	0	3	4	9	−5	0	0–1	3–4	1–4	

Updated to match(es) played on unknown. Source: IIHF

Group B
Pos	Team	Pld	W	D	L	GF	GA	GD	Pts	NED	ESP	BUL	ISR
1	Netherlands	3	3	0	0	35	3	+32	6		11–0	14–1	10–2
2	Spain	3	2	0	1	19	16	+3	4	0–11		13–2	6–3
3	Bulgaria	3	1	0	2	5	27	−22	2	1–14	2–13		2–0
4	Israel	3	0	0	3	5	18	−13	0	2–10	3–6	0–2	

Source: IIHF

=== Final ===
7th place
11 March 2001	Sofia	Yugoslavia	–	Israel	7:6 n.P. (1:2,2:3,3:1,0:0,1:0)
5th place
11 March 2001	Sofia	Bulgaria	–	Belgium	3:11 (1:2,0:4,2:5)
3rd place
11 March 2001	Sofia	Spain	–	South Africa	8:1 (4:0,2:1,2:0)
Final
11 March 2001	Sofia	Netherlands	–	Romania	4:3 (1:1,2:0,1:2)

Netherlands were promoted to the Division II, and Israel were relegated to Division III Qualification (which was not played, Israel returned to competition in 2003) for the 2002 IIHF World U18 Championships.
