= 2020 IIHF World U18 Championships =

2020 IIHF U18 World Championship

Tournament details
- Host country: United States
- Venues: 2 (in 2 host cities)
- Dates: 16–26 April (cancelled)
- Teams: 10

The 2020 IIHF World U18 Championship would have been the 22nd such event hosted by the International Ice Hockey Federation. Teams would have participated at several levels of competition. The competition also would have served as qualifications for the 2021 competition. The division II and III tournaments were cancelled by IIHF on 2 March 2020. The top division and division I tournaments were cancelled by the IIHF on 13 March 2020 due to the COVID-19 pandemic

== Top Division ==
The tournament was to be held from 16 to 26 April 2020 in Plymouth and Ann Arbor, United States, but was cancelled by the IIHF.

Originally, in June 2020, the IIHF allowed the hosts of the 2020 tournaments to host in 2021. However, with the pandemic-related restrictions still in place in the state of Michigan, in March 2021, the IIHF moved the tournament to Dallas.

=== Preliminary round ===
All times are local (UTC–4).

==== Group A ====
Pos	Team	Pld	W	OTW	OTL	L	GF	GA	GD	Pts	Qualification
1	Belarus	0	0	0	0	0	0	0	0	0	Advance to Quarterfinals
2	Canada	0	0	0	0	0	0	0	0	0	Advance to Quarterfinals
3	Latvia	0	0	0	0	0	0	0	0	0	Advance to Quarterfinals
4	Sweden	0	0	0	0	0	0	0	0	0	Advance to Quarterfinals
5	Switzerland	0	0	0	0	0	0	0	0	0	Advance to Relegation

First match(es) will be played: 16 April 2020. Source:

16 April 2020; 15:00	Switzerland	Cancelled	Latvia	Ann Arbor Ice Cube, Ann Arbor

16 April 2020; 19:00	Sweden	Cancelled	Belarus	Ann Arbor Ice Cube, Ann Arbor

17 April 2020; 15:00	Belarus	Cancelled	Switzerland	Ann Arbor Ice Cube, Ann Arbor

17 April 2020; 19:00	Sweden	Cancelled	Canada	Ann Arbor Ice Cube, Ann Arbor

18 April 2020; 19:00	Canada	Cancelled	Latvia	Ann Arbor Ice Cube, Ann Arbor

19 April 2020; 15:00	Switzerland	Cancelled	Sweden	Ann Arbor Ice Cube, Ann Arbor

19 April 2020; 19:00	Latvia	Cancelled	Belarus	Ann Arbor Ice Cube, Ann Arbor

20 April 2020; 19:00	Canada	Cancelled	Switzerland	Ann Arbor Ice Cube, Ann Arbor

21 April 2020; 15:00	Latvia	Cancelled	Sweden	Ann Arbor Ice Cube, Ann Arbor

21 April 2020; 19:00	Belarus	Cancelled	Canada	Ann Arbor Ice Cube, Ann Arbor

==== Group B ====
Pos	Team	Pld	W	OTW	OTL	L	GF	GA	GD	Pts	Qualification
1	Czech Republic	0	0	0	0	0	0	0	0	0	Advance to Quarterfinals
2	Germany	0	0	0	0	0	0	0	0	0	Advance to Quarterfinals
3	Finland	0	0	0	0	0	0	0	0	0	Advance to Quarterfinals
4	Russia	0	0	0	0	0	0	0	0	0	Advance to Quarterfinals
5	United States (H)	0	0	0	0	0	0	0	0	0	Advance to Relegation

First match(es) will be played: 16 April 2020. Source:
(H) Host

16 April 2020; 15:00	Czech Republic	Cancelled	Germany	USA Hockey Arena, Plymouth

16 April 2020; 19:00	Russia	Cancelled	United States	USA Hockey Arena, Plymouth

17 April 2020; 15:00	Russia	Cancelled	Finland	USA Hockey Arena, Plymouth

17 April 2020; 19:00	Germany	Cancelled	United States	USA Hockey Arena, Plymouth

18 April 2020; 19:00	Finland	Cancelled	Czech Republic	USA Hockey Arena, Plymouth

19 April 2020; 15:00	United States	Cancelled	Czech Republic	USA Hockey Arena, Plymouth

19 April 2020; 19:00	Germany	Cancelled	Russia	USA Hockey Arena, Plymouth

20 April 2020; 19:00	Finland	Cancelled	Germany	USA Hockey Arena, Plymouth

21 April 2020; 15:00	Czech Republic	Cancelled	Russia	USA Hockey Arena, Plymouth

21 April 2020; 19:00	United States	Cancelled	Finland	USA Hockey Arena, Plymouth

== Division I ==
=== Group A ===
The tournament was to be held in Spišská Nová Ves, Slovakia from 13 to 19 April 2020, but was cancelled by the IIHF.

- Denmark
- France
- Japan – Promoted from Division I B
- Kazakhstan
- Norway
- Slovakia – Relegated from Top Division

=== Group B ===
The tournament was to be held in Asiago, Italy from 12 to 18 April 2020, but was cancelled by the IIHF.

- Austria
- Hungary
- Italy
- Poland – Promoted from Division II A
- Slovenia
- Ukraine – Relegated from Division I A

== Division II ==
=== Group A ===
The tournament was to be held in Tallinn, Estonia from 22 to 28 March 2020, but was cancelled by the IIHF.

- Great Britain – Relegated from Division I B
- Estonia
- Lithuania
- Romania
- Serbia – Promoted from Division II B
- South Korea

=== Group B ===
The tournament was to be held in Sofia, Bulgaria from 23 to 29 March 2020, but was cancelled by the IIHF.

- Australia
- Bulgaria – Promoted from Division III A
- China
- Croatia
- Netherlands
- Spain – Relegated from Division II A

== Division III ==
=== Group A ===
The tournament was to be held in Istanbul, Turkey from 16 to 22 March 2020, but was cancelled by the IIHF.

- Belgium – Relegated from Division II B
- Chinese Taipei – Promoted from Division III B
- Iceland
- Israel
- Mexico
- Turkey

=== Group B ===
The tournament was to be held in Kockelscheuer, Luxembourg from 29 March to 4 April 2020, but was cancelled by the IIHF.

- Bosnia and Herzegovina
- Hong Kong
- Kyrgyzstan – Debut
- Luxembourg
- New Zealand – Relegated from Division III A
- South Africa
