= 2005 U-18 Junior World Cup =

The 2005 U-18 Junior World Cup was an ice hockey tournament held in Břeclav, Czech Republic and Piešťany, Slovakia between August 9, 2005 and August 14, 2005. The venues used for the tournament were Zimní Stadion in Břeclav and Zimny Stadion in Piešťany. Canada defeated the Czech Republic 5-3 in the final to claim the gold medal, while Finland defeated Russia to capture the bronze medal.

== Challenge results ==
=== Preliminary round ===
==== Group A ====
Team	Pld	W	L	D	GF	GA	GD	Pts
Canada	3	3	0	0	15	5	+10	9
Czech Republic	3	2	1	0	9	10	−1	6
Sweden	3	1	2	0	3	7	−4	3
Switzerland	3	0	3	0	7	12	−5	0

==== Group B ====
Team	Pld	W	L	D	GF	GA	GD	Pts
Russia	3	3	0	0	13	6	+7	9
Finland	3	1	1	1	6	5	+1	4
United States	3	1	1	1	11	11	0	4
Slovakia	3	0	3	0	7	15	−8	0

=== Final round ===
Semi finals
A1	Canada	3
B2	Finland	2
B1	Russia	2
A2	Czech Republic	3

Final
SF1	Canada	5
SF2	Czech Republic	3

=== Final standings ===
	Team
1	Canada
2	Czech Republic
3	Finland
4	Russia
5	United States
6	Slovakia
7	Sweden
8	Switzerland

Preceded by 2004 U-18 World Cup	U-18 Junior World Cup; 2005	Succeeded by 2006 Hlinka Tournament
