= 2008 Ivan Hlinka Memorial Tournament =

Tournament details
- Host countries: Slovakia; Czech Republic
- Venues: 2 (in 2 host cities)
- Dates: August 12–16, 2008
- Teams: 8

Final positions
- Champions: Canada (13th title)
- Runners-up: Russia
- Third place: Sweden
- Fourth place: Finland

Tournament statistics
- Games played: 16
- Goals scored: 127 (7.94 per game)
- Scoring leader: (Sweden) Magnus Pääjärvi (9 pts)

The 2008 Ivan Hlinka Memorial Tournament was an under-18 ice hockey tournament held in Břeclav, Czech Republic and Piešťany, Slovakia from August 12–16, 2008. The two venues were Alcaplast Arena in Břeclav and Zimný Štadión in Piešťany. Canada won their thirteenth gold medal of the tournament, defeating Russia 6–3 in the gold medal game, while Sweden defeated Finland 3–2 to earn the bronze medal.

== Preliminary round ==
=== Group A ===
Team	Pld	W	OTW	OTL	L	GF	GA	GD	Pts
Russia	3	3	0	0	0	16	7	+9	9
Finland	3	1	1	0	1	12	13	−1	5
Czech Republic	3	1	0	1	1	8	8	0	4
United States	3	0	0	0	3	8	16	−8	0

=== Group B ===
Team	Pld	W	OTW	OTL	L	GF	GA	GD	Pts
Canada	3	3	0	0	0	18	7	+11	9
Sweden	3	2	0	0	1	19	11	+8	6
Slovakia	3	1	0	0	2	9	16	−7	3
Switzerland	3	0	0	0	3	6	18	−12	0

=== Final round ===
==== Seventh place game ====
August 16, 2008; 15:30	United States	6–5	Switzerland	Alcaplast Arena

==== Fifth place game ====
August 16, 2008; 19:00	Czech Republic	4–3	Slovakia	Alcaplast Arena

==== Bronze medal game ====
August 16, 2008; 15:00	Finland	2–3	Sweden	Zimny Stadion

==== Gold medal game ====
August 16, 2008; 18:30	Russia	3–6	Canada	Zimny Stadion

=== Final standings ===
Rk.	Team
1st place, gold medalist(s)	Canada
2nd place, silver medalist(s)	Russia
3rd place, bronze medalist(s)	Sweden
4.	Finland
5.	Czech Republic
6.	Slovakia
7.	United States
8.	Switzerland

== See also ==
- 2008 IIHF World U18 Championships
- 2008 World Junior Championships

Preceded by 2007 Ivan Hlinka Memorial Tournament	Ivan Hlinka Memorial Tournament; 2008	Succeeded by 2009 Ivan Hlinka Memorial Tournament
