= 2005 IIHF World U18 Championships =

2005 IIHF World U18 Championship

Tournament details
- Host country: Czech Republic
- Venues: 2 (in 2 host cities)
- Dates: April 14–24, 2005
- Teams: 10

Final positions
- Champions: United States (2nd title)
- Runners-up: Canada
- Third place: Sweden
- Fourth place: Czech Republic

Tournament statistics
- Games played: 31
- Goals scored: 180 (5.81 per game)
- Attendance: 71,936 (2,321 per game)
- Scoring leader: (United States) Phil Kessel (16 points)

The 2005 IIHF World U18 Championships were held in České Budějovice and Plzeň, Czech Republic. The championships began on April 14, 2005, and finished on April 24, 2005. Games were played at Budvar Arena in České Budějovice and ČEZ Aréna in Plzeň. The United States to claim the second gold medal, after defeated Canada 5–1 in the final, while the Sweden defeated Czech Republic 4–2 to capture the bronze medal.

== Championship results ==
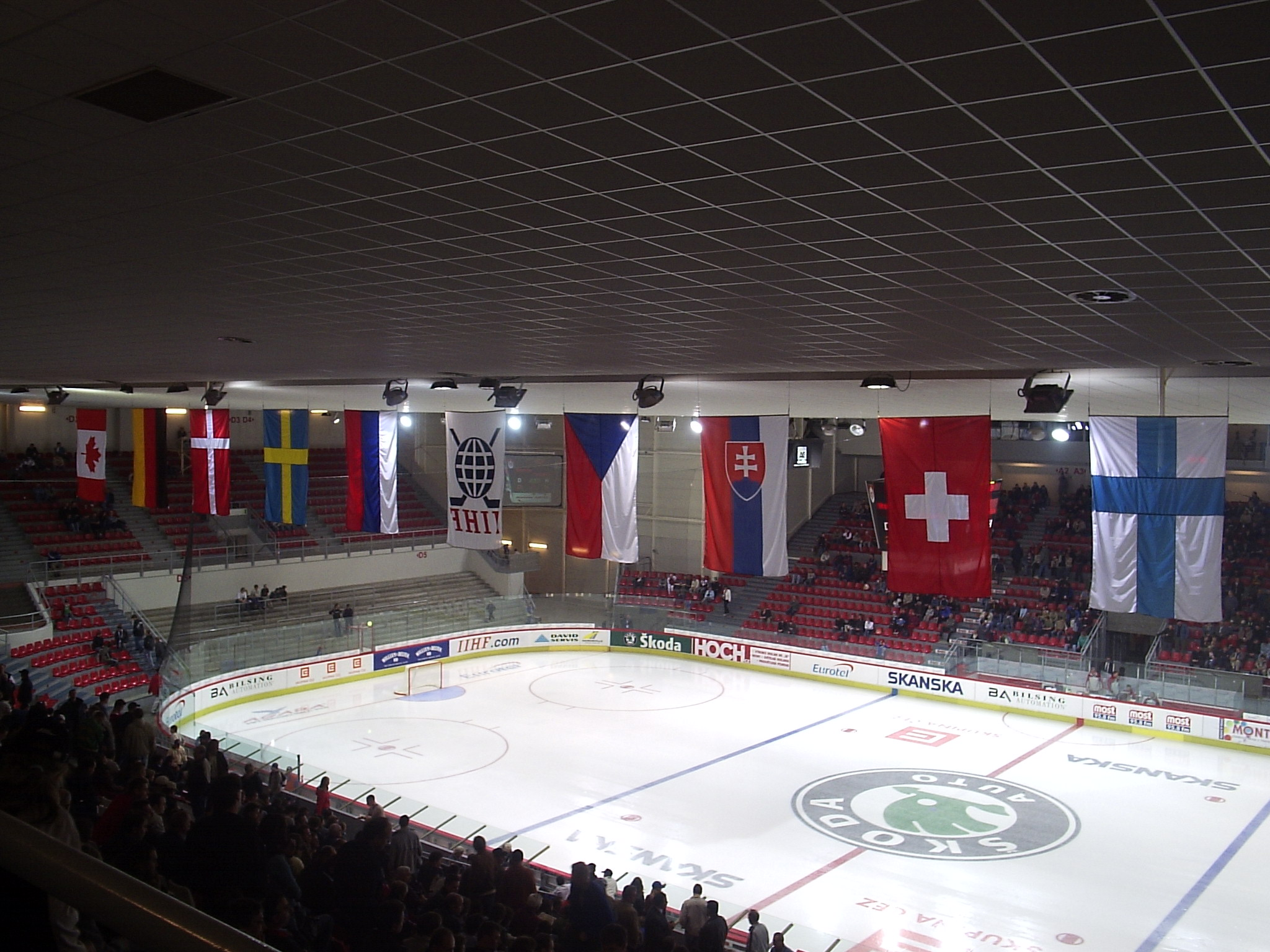
Budvar Arena

=== Preliminary round ===
==== Group A ====
Pos	Team	Pld	W	L	D	GF	GA	GD	Pts
1	Canada	4	3	1	0	24	7	+17	6
2	Sweden	4	3	1	0	9	6	+3	6
3	Russia	4	3	1	0	19	12	+7	6
4	Germany	4	1	3	0	10	18	−8	2
5	Denmark	4	0	4	0	4	23	−19	0

==== Group B ====
Pos	Team	Pld	W	L	D	GF	GA	GD	Pts
1	United States	4	4	0	0	17	5	+12	8
2	Czech Republic	4	3	1	0	16	6	+10	6
3	Slovakia	4	2	2	0	6	9	−3	4
4	Finland	4	1	3	0	6	13	−7	2
5	Switzerland	4	0	4	0	4	16	−12	0

=== Relegation round ===
Pos	Team	Pld	W	L	D	GF	GA	GD	Pts
1	Finland	3	3	0	0	10	5	+5	6
2	Germany	3	2	1	0	7	5	+2	4
3	Switzerland	3	1	2	0	5	7	−2	2
4	Denmark	3	0	3	0	5	10	−5	0

Note: The following matches from the preliminary round carry forward to the relegation round:

- April 15, 2005: Denmark 1–3 Germany
- April 15, 2005: Finland 3–1 Switzerland

=== Final round ===
Quarter finals
A2	Sweden	5
B3	Slovakia	3
B2	Czech Republic	5
A3	Russia	1

Semi finals
B1	United States	6
QF1	Sweden	2
A1	Canada	3
QF2	Czech Republic	2

Final
SF1	United States	5
SF2	Canada	1

Sweden beat Czech Republic for the bronze medal 4–2.
Russia beat Slovakia for 5th place 5–2.

=== Final standings ===
Rk.	Team
1st place, gold medalist(s)	United States
2nd place, silver medalist(s)	Canada
3rd place, bronze medalist(s)	Sweden
4	Czech Republic
5	Russia
6	Slovakia
7	Finland
8	Germany
9	Switzerland
10	Denmark

Switzerland and Denmark are relegated to Division I for the 2006 IIHF World U18 Championships.

=== Scoring leaders ===
Player	Country	GP	G	A	Pts	PIM
Phil Kessel	United States	6	9	7	16	2
Nathan Gerbe	United States	6	4	4	8	14
Ilya Zubov	Russia	6	3	5	8	6
Alexey Sopin	Russia	6	6	1	7	2
Peter Mueller	United States	6	4	3	7	20
Vyacheslav Buravchikov	Russia	6	3	4	7	4
Juraj Mikus	Slovakia	6	0	7	7	12
Martin Hanzal	Czech Republic	7	4	3	7	10
Nicklas Bergfors	Sweden	7	6	0	6	0
Devin Setoguchi	Canada	6	4	2	6	6
David Kveton	Czech Republic	7	4	2	6	4
Tomáš Káňa	Czech Republic	7	2	4	6	8

=== Goaltending leaders ===
(Minimum 60 minutes played)

Player	Country	MINS	GA	Sv%	GAA	SO
Pier-Olivier Pelletier	Canada	120:00	2	.959	1.00	0
Jeff Frazee	United States	360:00	8	.959	1.33	1
Jhonas Enroth	Sweden	141:08	4	.942	1.70	0
Ondřej Pavelec	Czech Republic	380:51	13	.932	2.05	1
Juha Toivonen	Finland	79:59	3	.875	2.25	0

== Division I ==
Division I consisted of two separate tournaments. The Group A tournament was held between 3 and 9 April 2005 in Maribor, Slovenia and the Group B tournament was held between 2 and 8 April 2005 in Sosnowiec, Poland. Belarus and Norway won the Group A and Group B tournaments respectively and gained promotion to the Championship Division for the 2006 IIHF World U18 Championships. While Great Britain finished last in Group A and Italy last in Group B and were both relegated to Division II for 2006.

Group standings

Group A

1. Belarus — promoted to Championship Division for 2006
2. Slovenia
3. Kazakhstan
4. France
5. Austria
6. Great Britain — relegated to Division II for 2006

Group B

1. Norway — promoted to Championship Division for 2006
2. Latvia
3. Ukraine
4. Poland
5. Japan
6. Italy — relegated to Division II for 2006

== Division II ==
Division II consisted of two separate tournaments. The Group A tournament was held between 14 and 20 March 2005 in Kohtla-Järve, Estonia and the Group B tournament was held between 21 and 27 March 2005 in Bucharest, Romania. South Korea and Hungary won the Group A and Group B tournaments respectively and gained promotion to Division I for the 2006 IIHF World U18 Championships. While South Africa finished last in Group A and Romania last in Group B and were both relegated to Division III for 2006.

Group standings

Group A

1. South Korea — promoted to Division I for 2006
2. Estonia
3. Netherlands
4. Spain
5. Serbia and Montenegro
6. South Africa — relegated to Division III for 2006

Group B

1. Hungary — promoted to Division I for 2006
2. Lithuania
3. Croatia
4. Mexico
5. Iceland
6. Romania — relegated to Division III for 2006

== Division III ==
The Division III tournament was held between 7 and 13 March 2005 in Sofia, Bulgaria. Australia and Belgium finished first and second respectively and both gained promotion to Division II for the 2006 IIHF World U18 Championships.

Group standings

1. Australia — promoted to Division II for 2006
2. Belgium — promoted to Division II for 2006
3. Israel
4. New Zealand
5. Turkey
6. Bulgaria

=== Division III Qualification ===
The Division III Qualification tournament was held between 18 and 20 February 2005 in Ankara, Turkey. Turkey won the tournament and qualified for the Division III tournament after winning both of their games against Armenia and Bosnia and Herzegovina.

Group standings

1. Turkey — qualified for the 2005 Division III tournament
2. Bosnia and Herzegovina
3. Armenia
