= 2007 Ivan Hlinka Memorial Tournament =

Tournament details
- Host countries: Czech Republic; Slovakia
- Venue(s): 2 (in 2 host cities)
- Dates: August 14–18, 2007
- Teams: 8

Final positions
- Champions: Sweden (1st title)
- Runner-up: Finland
- Third place: Russia
- Fourth place: Canada

Tournament statistics
- Games played: 16
- Goals scored: 106 (6.63 per game)

The 2007 Ivan Hlinka Memorial Tournament was an ice hockey tournament held in Hodonín, Czech Republic and Piešťany, Slovakia between August 14, 2007 and August 18, 2007. It was the 2007 installment of the Ivan Hlinka Memorial Tournament. Sweden defeated Finland 3–2 in the final to claim the gold medal, while Russia defeated Canada 5–4 to capture the bronze medal.

== Challenge results ==
=== Preliminary round ===
==== Group A ====
Team	Pld	W	OTW	OTL	L	GF	GA	GD	Pts
Sweden	3	2	1	0	0	13	7	+6	8
Canada	3	2	0	1	0	9	6	+3	7
Czech Republic	3	1	0	0	2	6	12	−6	3
Switzerland	3	0	0	0	3	5	8	−3	0

==== Group B ====
Team	Pld	W	OTW	OTL	L	GF	GA	GD	Pts
Finland	3	2	1	0	0	13	8	+5	8
Russia	3	2	0	0	1	11	9	+2	6
United States	3	1	0	0	2	11	13	−2	3
Slovakia	3	0	0	1	2	8	13	−5	1

=== Final round ===
Schedule

All times local (UTC +1)

==== Seventh place game ====
August 18, 2007	Switzerland	5–1	Slovakia	Piešťany

==== Fifth place game ====
August 18, 2007; 15:30	Czech Republic	5–6 (SO)	United States	Hodonín

==== Bronze medal game ====
August 18, 2007	Russia	5–4	Canada	Piešťany

==== Gold medal game ====
August 18, 2007	Sweden	3–2 (OT) (1–0, 0–0, 1–2); OT: (1–0)	Finland	Hodonín

Ekholm (Pääjärvi) – 03:57	1–0
	1–1	45:24 – Myttynen (Jormakka)
Johansson (Rundblad) (Tedenby) – 54:18	2–1
	2–2	59:52 – Sointu (Rask) (Rajala)
Hedman (Markström) – 63:39	3–2

=== Final standings ===
Rk.	Team
1st place, gold medalist(s)	Sweden
2nd place, silver medalist(s)	Finland
3rd place, bronze medalist(s)	Russia
4.	Canada
5.	United States
6.	Czech Republic
7.	Switzerland
8.	Slovakia

Preceded by 2006 Hlinka Tournament	Ivan Hlinka Memorial Tournament; 2007	Succeeded by 2008 Hlinka Tournament
