= Václav Prospal =

Czech ice hockey player

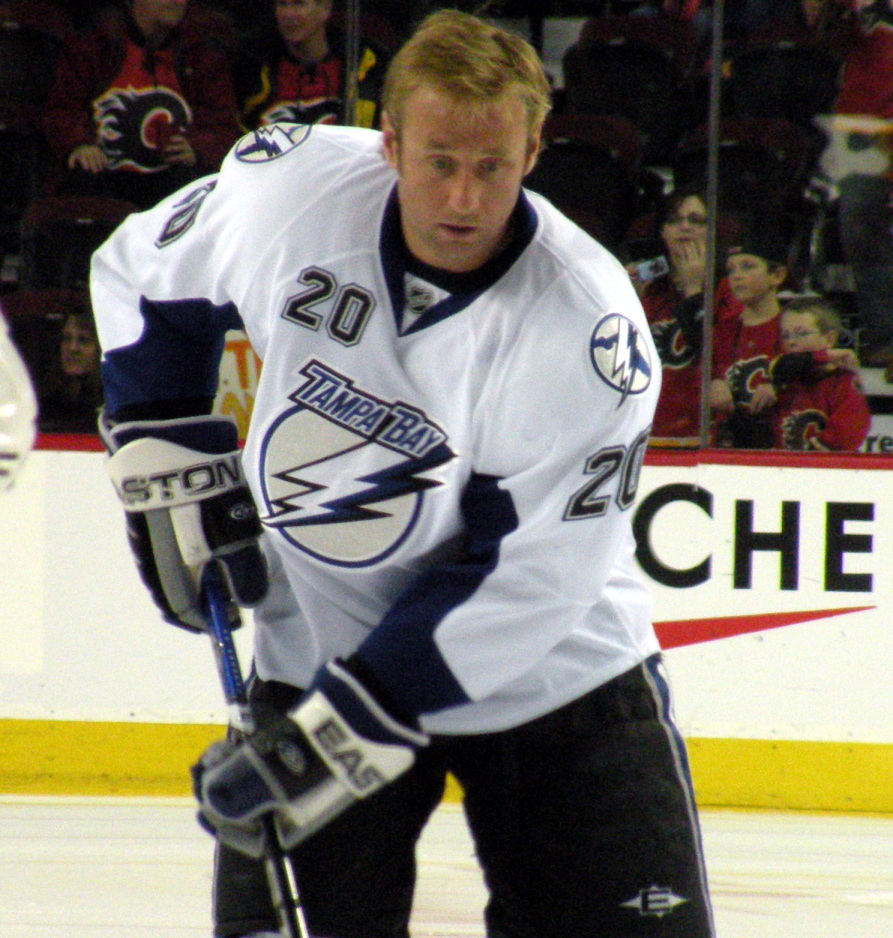
- Prospal with the Tampa Bay Lightning in 2009
- Born: 17 February 1975 (age 51) České Budějovice, Czechoslovakia
- Height: 6 ft 2 in (188 cm)
- Weight: 198 lb (90 kg; 14 st 2 lb)
- Position: Left wing Centre
- Shot: Left
- Played for: Philadelphia Flyers; Ottawa Senators; Florida Panthers; Tampa Bay Lightning; Mighty Ducks of Anaheim; New York Rangers; Columbus Blue Jackets; HC České Budějovice
- National team: Czech Republic
- NHL draft: 71st overall, 1993; Philadelphia Flyers
- Playing career: 1993–2013

Václav "Vinny" Prospal (born 17 February 1975) is a Czech former professional ice hockey player, currently a hockey coach. He played 16 seasons in the National Hockey League (NHL) for the Philadelphia Flyers, Ottawa Senators, Florida Panthers, Tampa Bay Lightning, Mighty Ducks of Anaheim, New York Rangers and Columbus Blue Jackets from. 1997 to 2013. He is currently serving as an assistant coach for the St. Louis Blues.

== Playing career ==
Prospal was drafted by the Philadelphia Flyers in the 1993 NHL entry draft, third round, 71st overall. While with the Flyers, Prospal suffered a fractured arm during the 1997 playoffs. Prospal and another player collided during the Flyers' practice session. During the 1997–98 season, Prospal, who was named to the 1998 Czech Olympic hockey team, broke his leg while fighting for the puck with Lance Pitlick during a game with the Ottawa Senators; Prospal was unable to play in the 1998 Winter Olympics. Prospal was traded to the Senators a few months later. During the 2004–05 lockout, Prospal played for his hometown team HC České Budějovice, leading them in scoring and helping the team return to the Czech Extraliga.

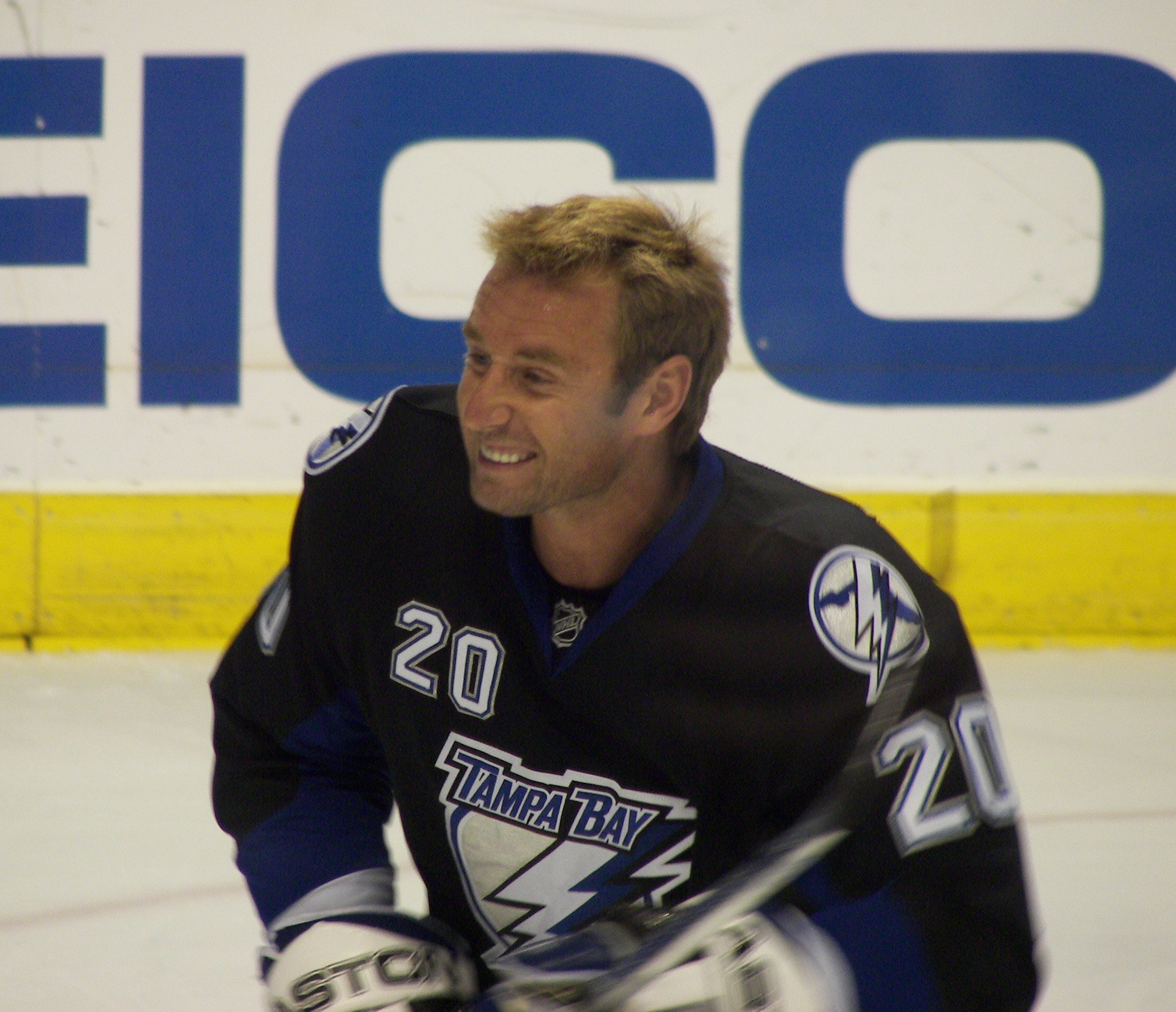
Prospal in 2007.

At the beginning of the 2007–08 season, while with the Lightning, Prospal posted 12 goals and 10 assists making it his best career start. On February 25, 2008, Prospal was dealt back to the Flyers for defenseman Alexandre Picard and a 2009 second-round draft pick.

On June 18, 2008, the Lightning acquired the rights to Prospal in exchange for the Nashville Predators' seventh-round pick (previously acquired), 196th overall, in the 2008 NHL Entry Draft. The Lightning signed Prospal to a four-year contract on June 30, in a deal worth $14 million overall to the player.

On July 28, 2009, Prospal was bought out from the remaining three years of his contract with the Lightning and became a free agent. On August 16, 2009, Prospal signed a one-year, $1.1 million contract with the New York Rangers. He was named an alternate captain of the Rangers on November 3, 2009. On July 1, 2010, Prospal was re-signed by the Rangers to another one-year deal worth $2.1 million. After he was not re-signed in 2011, he agreed to a 1-year $1.75 million deal with the Columbus Blue Jackets in the summer of 2011, followed by one-year, $2.5 million contract for the 2012–13 season. On January 24, 2014, he announced his retirement from professional hockey.

== Post-hockey career ==
Prospal worked as a scout for the New York Rangers until the end of the 2013–14 season. He served as an assistant coach for the Czech national team across several events from 2016 to 2018 including the World Championships (2017 and 2018), the 2016 World Cup of Hockey, and the 2018 Winter Olympics. In 2018, he took over the head coaching job at Motor České Budějovice where he played his youth hockey. In three seasons, he saw the team promoted from the second tier 1st Czech Republic Hockey League to the top flight Czech Extraliga. After a few years off, in 2023, he returned to North America as an assistant coach for the Rochester Americans of the American Hockey League. On June 15, 2026, Prospal was hired by the St. Louis Blues to join their assistant coaching ranks.

== Career statistics ==
=== Regular season and playoffs ===
| | | | Regular season | | | | | Playoffs |
| Season | Team | League | GP | G | A | Pts | PIM | GP | G | A | Pts | PIM |
|---|---|---|---|---|---|---|---|---|---|---|---|---|
| 1991–92 | TJ Motor České Budějovice | CSSR U18 | 36 | 16 | 16 | 32 | 12 | — | — | — | — | — |
| 1992–93 | HC České Budějovice | CSSR U18 | 36 | 26 | 31 | 57 | 24 | — | — | — | — | — |
| 1993–94 | Hershey Bears | AHL | 55 | 14 | 21 | 35 | 38 | 2 | 0 | 0 | 0 | 2 |
| 1994–95 | Hershey Bears | AHL | 69 | 13 | 32 | 45 | 36 | 2 | 1 | 0 | 1 | 4 |
| 1995–96 | Hershey Bears | AHL | 68 | 15 | 36 | 51 | 59 | 5 | 2 | 4 | 6 | 2 |
| 1996–97 | Philadelphia Flyers | NHL | 18 | 5 | 10 | 15 | 4 | 5 | 1 | 3 | 4 | 4 |
| 1996–97 | Philadelphia Phantoms | AHL | 63 | 32 | 63 | 95 | 70 | — | — | — | — | — |
| 1997–98 | Philadelphia Flyers | NHL | 41 | 5 | 13 | 18 | 17 | — | — | — | — | — |
| 1997–98 | Ottawa Senators | NHL | 15 | 1 | 6 | 7 | 4 | 6 | 0 | 0 | 0 | 0 |
| 1998–99 | Ottawa Senators | NHL | 79 | 10 | 26 | 36 | 58 | 4 | 0 | 0 | 0 | 0 |
| 1999–00 | Ottawa Senators | NHL | 79 | 22 | 33 | 55 | 40 | 6 | 0 | 4 | 4 | 4 |
| 2000–01 | Ottawa Senators | NHL | 40 | 1 | 12 | 13 | 12 | — | — | — | — | — |
| 2000–01 | Florida Panthers | NHL | 34 | 4 | 12 | 16 | 10 | — | — | — | — | — |
| 2001–02 | Tampa Bay Lightning | NHL | 81 | 18 | 37 | 55 | 38 | — | — | — | — | — |
| 2002–03 | Tampa Bay Lightning | NHL | 80 | 22 | 57 | 79 | 53 | 11 | 4 | 2 | 6 | 8 |
| 2003–04 | Mighty Ducks of Anaheim | NHL | 82 | 19 | 35 | 54 | 54 | — | — | — | — | — |
| 2004–05 | HC České Budějovice | CZE-2 | 39 | 28 | 60 | 88 | 82 | 16 | 15 | 15 | 30 | 32 |
| 2005–06 | Tampa Bay Lightning | NHL | 81 | 25 | 55 | 80 | 50 | 5 | 0 | 2 | 2 | 0 |
| 2006–07 | Tampa Bay Lightning | NHL | 82 | 14 | 41 | 55 | 36 | 6 | 1 | 4 | 5 | 4 |
| 2007–08 | Tampa Bay Lightning | NHL | 62 | 29 | 28 | 57 | 31 | — | — | — | — | — |
| 2007–08 | Philadelphia Flyers | NHL | 18 | 4 | 10 | 14 | 6 | 17 | 3 | 10 | 13 | 6 |
| 2008–09 | Tampa Bay Lightning | NHL | 82 | 19 | 26 | 45 | 52 | — | — | — | — | — |
| 2009–10 | New York Rangers | NHL | 75 | 20 | 38 | 58 | 32 | — | — | — | — | — |
| 2010–11 | New York Rangers | NHL | 29 | 9 | 14 | 23 | 8 | 5 | 1 | 0 | 1 | 0 |
| 2011–12 | Columbus Blue Jackets | NHL | 82 | 16 | 39 | 55 | 36 | — | — | — | — | — |
| 2012–13 | HC Mountfield | CZE | 19 | 9 | 14 | 23 | 46 | — | — | — | — | — |
| 2012–13 | Columbus Blue Jackets | NHL | 48 | 12 | 18 | 30 | 32 | — | — | — | — | — |
| NHL totals | | | 1,108 | 255 | 510 | 765 | 581 | 65 | 10 | 25 | 35 | 26 |

=== International ===
Medal record

Representing Czech Republic

Ice hockey

Olympic Games
| Bronze medal – third place | 2006 Torino | |

World Championships
| Gold medal – first place | 2005 Vienna | |
| Gold medal – first place | 2000 Saint Petersburg | |

European Junior Championships
| Bronze medal – third place | 1993 Poland | |

| Year | Team | Event | GP | G | A | Pts | PIM |
|---|---|---|---|---|---|---|---|
| 1993 | Czech Republic | EJC | 6 | 4 | 7 | 11 | 2 |
| 1994 | Czech Republic | WJC | 7 | 1 | 1 | 2 | 16 |
| 1995 | Czech Republic | WJC | 7 | 3 | 7 | 10 | 2 |
| 2000 | Czech Republic | WC | 9 | 3 | 4 | 7 | 8 |
| 2004 | Czech Republic | WC | 7 | 3 | 4 | 7 | 2 |
| 2004 | Czech Republic | WCH | 4 | 1 | 3 | 4 | 0 |
| 2005 | Czech Republic | WC | 9 | 2 | 6 | 8 | 4 |
| 2006 | Czech Republic | OLY | 8 | 4 | 2 | 6 | 2 |
| Junior totals | | | 20 | 8 | 15 | 23 | 20 |
| Senior totals | | | 37 | 13 | 19 | 32 | 16 |

== See also ==
- List of NHL players with 1,000 games played
