= Slovakia men's national under-18 ice hockey team =

Slovakia
- Nickname: Repre, Chlapci (Boys), Naši chlapci (Our Boys)
- Association: Slovak Ice Hockey Federation
- Head coach: Martin Dendis
- Assistants: Michal Dostál; Andrej Kmeč
- Home stadium: Piešťany Ice Arena
- Team colors
- IIHF code: SVK
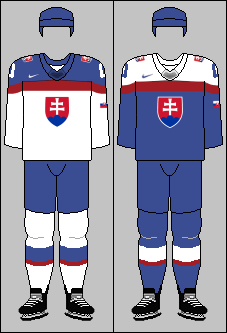

First international
- Slovakia 5–2 Ukraine (Riga, Latvia; March 1993)

Biggest win
- Slovakia 39–0 Bulgaria (Riga, Latvia; March 1993)

Biggest defeat
- Slovakia 0–10 United States (Lucerne, Switzerland; 17 April 2015); Slovakia 4–14 Canada (Trenčín, Slovakia; 1 August 2023)

IIHF World U18 Championship
- Appearances: 16 (first in 1999)
- Best result: Silver: 2 – 2003, 2026

Medal record

World U18 Championships
| Silver medal – second place | 2003 Russia | |
| Silver medal – second place | 2026 Slovakia | |
| Bronze medal – third place | 1999 Germany | |

Hlinka Gretzky Cup
| Silver medal – second place | 2021 Slovakia/Czech Republic | |
| Bronze medal – third place | 1997 Czech Republic | |
| Bronze medal – third place | 1998 Slovakia | |

The Slovakia men's national under-18 ice hockey team is the men's national under-18 ice hockey team of Slovakia. The team is controlled by the Slovak Ice Hockey Federation, a member of the International Ice Hockey Federation. The team represents Slovakia at the IIHF World U18 Championships. The team also competes in The Slovak 1. Liga, the second tier of Slovak hockey pyramid, as a preparation for the World U18 Championship.

== International competitions ==
=== IIHF European U18 Championships ===
==== Lower divisions ====
| Division | Tournament | GP | W | T | L | GF | GA | Finish | Rank |
|---|---|---|---|---|---|---|---|---|---|
| C | (Latvia) 1993 Riga | 6 | 4 | 0 | 1 | 54 | 6 | Final Round | 2nd |
| C | (Slovenia) 1994 Bled | 5 | 5 | 0 | 0 | 111 | 14 | Winner, Promoted | 1st |
| B | (Slovakia) 1995 Senica / Skalica | 5 | 5 | 0 | 0 | 58 | 3 | Winner, Promoted | 1st |

==== Top division ====
| Tournament | GP | W | T | L | GF | GA | Finish | Rank |
|---|---|---|---|---|---|---|---|---|
| (Russia) 1996 Ufa | 5 | 1 | 0 | 4 | 17 | 24 | Placing Round | 7th |
| (Czech Republic) 1997 Znojmo / Třebíč | 6 | 1 | 0 | 5 | 14 | 28 | Final Round | 6th |
| (Sweden) 1998 Mora / Malung | 6 | 1 | 0 | 5 | 15 | 21 | Final Round | 6th |

=== IIHF World U18 Championships ===
==== Top division ====
| Tournament | GP | W | OW | T | OL | L | GF | GA | Finish | Rank |
|---|---|---|---|---|---|---|---|---|---|---|
| (Germany) 1999 Füssen / Kaufbeuren | 8 | 5 | – | 0 | – | 2 | 26 | 17 | Final Group | 3rd place, bronze medalist(s) |
| (Switzerland) 2000 Kloten / Weinfelden | 6 | 2 | 1 | 2 | 0 | 1 | 16 | 16 | 5th Place Game | 5th |
| (Finland) 2001 Heinola / Helsinki / Lahti | 6 | 1 | – | 4 | – | 1 | 19 | 24 | Relegation Group | 8th |
| (Slovakia) 2002 Piešťany / Trnava | 8 | 3 | – | 0 | – | 5 | 18 | 25 | Relegation Group | 8th |
| (Russia) 2003 Yaroslavl | 7 | 5 | 0 | 0 | 0 | 2 | 22 | 14 | Final | 2nd place, silver medalist(s) |
| (Belarus) 2004 Minsk | 6 | 1 | 0 | 3 | 0 | 2 | 18 | 15 | 5th Place Game | 6th |
| (Czech Republic) 2005 České Budějovice / Plzeň | 5 | 2 | 0 | 0 | 0 | 3 | 9 | 14 | Quarterfinals | 6th |
| (Sweden) 2006 Ängelholm / Halmstad | 6 | 1 | – | 0 | – | 4 | 13 | 19 | Relegation Group | 7th |
| (Finland) 2007 Tampere / Rauma | 6 | 3 | 0 | – | 1 | 2 | 15 | 18 | 5th Place Game | 5h |
| (Russia) 2008 Kazan | 6 | 2 | 0 | – | 1 | 2 | 22 | 22 | Relegation Group | 7th |
| (United States) 2009 Fargo | 6 | 2 | 0 | – | 1 | 3 | 15 | 35 | Relegation Group | 7th |
| (Belarus) 2010 Minsk / Babruysk | 6 | 2 | 0 | – | 0 | 4 | 17 | 20 | Relegation Group | 8th |
| (Germany) 2011 Crimmitschau / Dresden | 6 | 1 | 0 | – | 0 | 5 | 14 | 29 | Relegated | 10th |
| (Czech Republic) 2012 Brno, Znojmo and Břeclav | Playing in lower division | | | | | | | | | |
| (Russia) 2013 Sochi | 6 | 2 | 0 | – | 0 | 4 | 15 | 23 | Relegation Round | 9th |
| (Finland) 2014 Lappeenranta / Imatra | 5 | 1 | 0 | – | 1 | 3 | 11 | 18 | Quarterfinals | 8th |
| (Switzerland) 2015 Zug / Lucerne | 5 | 1 | 1 | – | 0 | 3 | 9 | 21 | Quarterfinals | 7th |
| (United States) 2016 Grand Forks | 5 | 2 | 0 | – | 0 | 3 | 14 | 21 | Quarterfinals | 5th |
| (Slovakia) 2017 Poprad / Spišská Nová Ves | 5 | 2 | 0 | – | 2 | 1 | 15 | 13 | Quarterfinals | 6th |
| (Russia) 2018 Chelyabinsk / Magnitogorsk | 5 | 2 | 0 | – | 1 | 2 | 20 | 20 | Quarterfinals | 7th |
| (Sweden) 2019 Örnsköldsvik / Umeå | 7 | 1 | 0 | – | 0 | 6 | 17 | 38 | Relegated | 10th |
| (United States) 2020 Plymouth / Ann Arbor | Playing in lower division | | | | | | | | | |
| (United States) 2021 Frisco / Plano | Playing in lower division | | | | | | | | | |
| (Germany) 2022 Landshut / Kaufbeuren | Playing in lower division | | | | | | | | | |
| (Switzerland) 2023 Basel / Porrentruy | 7 | 2 | 1 | – | 1 | 3 | 22 | 28 | Bronze medal game | 4th |
| (Finland) 2024 Espoo / Vantaa | 7 | 2 | – | – | – | 5 | 19 | 32 | Bronze medal game | 4th |
| (United States) 2025 Frisco / Allen | 7 | 3 | 1 | – | 1 | 2 | 20 | 23 | Bronze medal game | 4th |
| (Slovakia) 2026 Trenčín / Bratislava | 7 | 5 | 0 | – | 1 | 1 | 27 | 14 | Final | 2nd place, silver medalist(s) |

==== Lower divisions ====
| Division | Tournament | GP | W | OW | T | OL | L | GF | GA | Finish | Rank |
|---|---|---|---|---|---|---|---|---|---|---|---|
| IA | (Slovakia) 2012 Piešťany | 5 | 5 | 0 | – | 0 | 0 | 30 | 6 | Winner, Promoted | 1st |
| IA | (Slovakia) 2020 Spišská Nová Ves | Cancelled by the IIHF due to COVID-19 pandemic | | | | | | | | | |
| IA | (Slovakia) 2021 Spišská Nová Ves | Cancelled by the IIHF due to COVID-19 pandemic | | | | | | | | | |
| IA | (Slovakia) 2022 Piešťany | 5 | 5 | 0 | – | 0 | 0 | 27 | 11 | Winner, Promoted | 1st |

=== Hlinka Gretzky Cup ===
- 1997: (bronze) Bronze
- 1998: (bronze) Bronze
- 1999: 4th place
- 2000: 4th place
- 2001: 5th place
- 2002: 7th place
- 2003: 5th place
- 2004: 6th place
- 2005: 6th place
- 2006: 7th place
- 2007: 8th place
- 2008: 6th place
- 2009: 6th place
- 2010: 8th place
- 2011: 8th place
- 2012: 8th place
- 2013: 8th place
- 2014: 8th place
- 2015: 8th place
- 2016: 7th place
- 2017: 8th place
- 2018: 6th place
- 2019: 7th place
- 2021: (silver) Silver
- 2022: 6th place
- 2023: 8th place
- 2024: 5th place

== 1.Liga ==
Since the 2013-14 season, Slovakia national under-18 ice hockey team competes in 1.Liga, the second tier of Slovak hockey pyramid, in order to prepare for the IIHF World U18 Championship. Throughout the season, the team plays 44 matches as all other teams, but without a possibility of relegation or promotion. The team plays under the name SR 18 and plays its home matches at a stadium in Trnava.

| Year | GP | W | OW | OL | L | GF | GA | Pts | Finish |
|---|---|---|---|---|---|---|---|---|---|
| 2013–14 | 44 | 9 | 2 | 3 | 30 | 98 | 164 | 34 | 11th |
