= 2006 Ivan Hlinka Memorial Tournament =

Tournament details
- Host countries: Czech Republic; Slovakia
- Venue(s): 2 (in 2 host cities)
- Dates: August 8–12, 2006
- Teams: 8

Final positions
- Champions: Canada (12th title)
- Runner-up: United States
- Third place: Russia
- Fourth place: Sweden

Tournament statistics
- Games played: 16
- Goals scored: 89 (5.56 per game)

The 2006 Ivan Hlinka Memorial Tournament was an ice hockey tournament held in Břeclav, Czech Republic and Piešťany, Slovakia between August 8, 2006 and August 12, 2006. The venues used for the tournament were Zimní Stadion in Břeclav and Zimny Stadion in Piešťany. Canada defeated the United States of America 3-0 in the final to claim the gold medal, while Russia defeated Sweden 4-2 to capture the bronze medal.

== Challenge results ==
=== Preliminary round ===
==== Group A ====
Pos	Team	Pld	W	OTW	OTL	L	GF	GA	GD	Pts
1	United States	3	2	1	0	0	11	8	+3	8
2	Russia	3	2	0	0	1	13	7	+6	6
3	Czech Republic	3	1	0	1	1	8	12	−4	4
4	Finland	3	0	0	0	3	5	10	−5	0

==== Group B ====
Pos	Team	Pld	W	OTW	OTL	L	GF	GA	GD	Pts
1	Canada	3	3	0	0	0	13	5	+8	9
2	Sweden	3	1	1	0	1	8	8	0	5
3	Switzerland	3	1	0	0	2	8	11	−3	3
4	Slovakia	3	0	0	1	2	3	8	−5	1

=== Final round ===
Schedule

All times local (UTC +1)

==== Seventh place game ====
August 11, 2006; 18:30	Slovakia	5–2	Finland	Piešťany

==== Fifth place game ====
August 11, 2006; 16:00	Czech Republic	3–1	Switzerland	Břeclav

==== Bronze medal game ====
August 11, 2006; 15:00	Russia	4–2	Sweden	Piešťany

==== Gold medal game ====
August 11, 2006; 19:00	Canada	3–0	United States	Břeclav

=== Final standings ===
	Team
1	Canada
2	United States
3	Russia
4	Sweden
5	Czech Republic
6	Switzerland
7	Slovakia
8	Finland

Preceded by 2005 U-18 World Cup	Ivan Hlinka Memorial Tournament; 2006	Succeeded by 2007 Hlinka Tournament
