= 1993 IIHF European U18 Championship =

The 1993 IIHF European U18 Championship was the twenty-sixth playing of the IIHF European Junior Championships.

== Group A ==
Played April 2 to 9, 1993 in Nowy Targ and Oswiecim, Poland.

=== First round ===
Group 1

Team	CZE	FIN	GER	ITA	GF/GA	Points
1. Czech Republic		6:2	12:0	15:1	33:3	6
2. Finland	2:6		5:0	4:0	11:6	4
3. Germany	0:12	0:5		1:1	1:18	1
4. Italy	1:15	0:4	1:1		2:20	1

Group 2

Team	SWE	RUS	NOR	POL	GF/GA	Points
1. Sweden		7:2	13:1	14:1	34:4	6
2. Russia	2:7		9:2	7:1	18:10	4
3. Norway	1:13	2:9		5:5	8:27	1
4. Poland	1:14	1:7	5:5		7:26	1

=== Final round ===
Championship round

Team	SWE	RUS	CZE	FIN	NOR	GER	GF/GA	Points
1. Sweden		(7:2)	2:1	6:4	(13:1)	7:1	35:9	10
2. Russia	(2:7)		4:0	2:2	(9:2)	15:0	32:11	7
3. Czech Republic	1:2	0:4		(6:2)	18:0	(12:0)	37:8	6
4. Finland	4:6	2:2	(2:6)		5:1	(5:0)	18:15	5
5. Norway	(1:13)	(2:9)	0:18	1:5		4:2	8:47	2
6. Germany	1:7	0:15	(0:12)	(0:5)	2:4		3:43	0

7th place

Poland	6:8	9:4	10:7	Italy

Italy was relegated to Group B for 1994.

== Tournament Awards ==
- Top Scorer (Czech Republic) Tomás Blazek (13 points)
- Top Goalie: (Russia) Denis Kuzmenko
- Top Defenceman: (Czech Republic) Radim Bicanek
- Top Forward: (Sweden) Niklas Sundström

== Group B ==
Played March 18 to 28, 1993 in Bucharest, Romania.

Team	SUI	HUN	FRA	AUT	ROM	DEN	ESP	GBR	GF	GA
1. Switzerland		4:2	6:1	12:0	11:1	5:0	11:2	9:2	58:8	14
2. Hungary	2:4		3:1	4:3	8:1	3:1	10:2	10:2	40:14	12
3. France	1:6	1:3		3:1	4:1	4:2	12:0	14:0	39:13	10
4. Austria	0:12	3:4	1:3		6:3	3:2	2:2	7:4	22:30	7
5. Romania	1:11	1:8	1:4	3:6		7:2	4:5	6:3	23:39	4
6. Denmark	0:5	1:3	2:4	2:3	2:7		4:3	2:1	13:26	4
7. Spain	2:11	2:10	0:12	2:2	5:4	3:4		4:5	18:48	3
8. Great Britain	2:9	2:10	0:14	4:7	3:6	1:2	5:4		17:52	2

Switzerland was promoted to Group A and Great Britain was relegated to Group C, for 1994.

== Group C ==
=== Qualification ===
Played November 4 and 5, 1992.

Croatia	0:9; 0:16	Slovenia	Zagreb; Ljubljana

Played March 22 to 28, in Riga Latvia. Seven of the nine participants were new to the tournament.

=== First round ===
Group 1

Team	SLO	LTU	NED	GF/GA	Points
1. Slovenia		8:1	7:0	15:1	4
2. Lithuania	1:8		7:3	8:11	2
3. Netherlands	0:7	3:7		3:14	0

Group 2

Team	SVK	UKR	BUL	GF/GA	Points
1. Slovakia		5:2	39:0	44:2	4
2. Ukraine	2:5		29:1	31:6	2
3. Bulgaria	0:39	1:29		1:68	0

Group 3

Team	BLR	LAT	EST	GF/GA	Points
1. Belarus		3:2	6:3	9:5	4
2. Latvia	2:3		10:4	12:7	2
3. Estonia	3:6	4:10		7:16	0

=== Final round ===
1st-3rd place

Team	BLR	SVK	SLO	GF/GA	Points
1. Belarus		4:1	3:3	7:4	3
2. Slovakia	1:4		9:0	10:4	2
3. Slovenia	3:3	0:9		3:12	1

4th-6th place

Team	UKR	LAT	LTU	GF/GA	Points
1. Ukraine		6:4	19:1	25:5	4
2. Latvia	4:6		5:1	9:7	2
3. Lithuania	1:19	1:5		2:24	0

7th-9th place

Team	EST	NED	BUL	GF/GA	Points
1. Estonia		7:4	24:0	31:4	4
2. Netherlands	4:7		7:3	11:10	2
3. Bulgaria	0:24	3:7		3:31	0

Belarus was promoted to Group B for 1994.
