= 1992 Pacific Cup =

The 1992 Pacific Cup may refer to:

- 1992 Pacific Cup (ice hockey), the 1992 edition of the Ivan Hlinka Memorial Tournament
- 1992 Pacific Cup (rugby league), the 1992 edition of the rugby league Pacific Cup
- 1992 Pacific Cup (tennis), the Taipei leg of the 1992 ATP Tour
