= Yuri Klyuchnikov =

Yuri Klyuchnikov may refer to:

- Yuri Klyuchnikov (diplomat) (1886-1938) - Russian and Soviet lawyer and diplomat.
- Yuri Klyuchnikov (footballer) (born 1963), Russian football referee and former player
- Yuri Klyuchnikov (ice hockey) (born 1983), Russian ice hockey goaltender
