= Hlinka Gretzky Cup =

International ice hockey tournament

- Current season, competition or edition: 2026 Hlinka Gretzky Cup
- Sport: Ice hockey
- Founded: 1991; 35 years ago
- No. of teams: 8
- Countries: Slovakia, Czech Republic, Canada
- Most recent champion: Canada (26th title) (2026)
- Most titles: Canada (26 titles)

The Hlinka Gretzky Cup is an annual international under-18 ice hockey tournament administered by Hockey Canada, the Czech Ice Hockey Association, and the Slovak Ice Hockey Federation.

Held since 1991, it has been contested under various titles and in various countries, including Japan, Mexico, and Canada. From 1997 through 2017, hosting duties for the event alternated between, and were later split between, the Czech Republic and Slovakia. During this period, the event was known as the Nations Cup, the U-18 Junior World Cup, and Ivan Hlinka Memorial Tournament. From 2018 through 2023, the tournament alternated between Edmonton/Red Deer, Alberta and Břeclav, Czech Republic/Piešťany, Slovakia.

The event is not sanctioned by the International Ice Hockey Federation (IIHF), which holds its own U18 championship in April.

The tournament is a prominent pre-season showcase for National Hockey League (NHL) prospects and it highlights players in the summer prior to their draft year. In one such example, 17 players on Canada's winning team from 2017 were selected with first-round picks in the 2018 NHL entry draft.

== History ==
The tournament started in 1991, hosted by Japan for the first three years, as well as the fifth. In its first year, it was known as the Phoenix Cup, after which the Pacific Cup moniker was adopted (with the exception of 1994, when Mexico served as the host country and the tournament was known as La Copa Mexico).

In 1996, the tournament was first held in Canada. Beginning in 1997, four years after the dissolution of Czechoslovakia, the Czech Republic and Slovakia began alternating as hosts, and the tournament was renamed the Nations Cup. The two countries alternated until 2003, then co-hosted from 2003 through 2017. At this time, it was also renamed the U-18 Junior World Cup.

In 2007, the event was renamed the Ivan Hlinka Memorial Tournament in honour of prominent Czech player and the most successful Czech national team head coach Ivan Hlinka—who had died in a vehicle accident in 2004.

In January 2018, Hockey Canada announced that the 2018 edition would be co-hosted by Edmonton and Red Deer, Alberta, in association with Oilers Entertainment Group (OEG) and the Czech and Slovak ice hockey federations, and that the event had been renamed the Hlinka Gretzky Cup, honouring Edmonton Oilers hall of famer Wayne Gretzky and Czech legend Ivan Hlinka. The tournament will alternate between Edmonton/Red Deer and Břeclav/Piešťany annually through 2022.

The Sports Network (TSN) first televised the Hlinka Gretzky Cup in 2018, after reaching an agreement with OEG executive Bob Nicholson. TSN vice-president Paul Graham envisioned a marketable hockey event in August despite low in-person attendance at the time. He felt that agreeing to televise the 2019 event in Europe was part of a process of educating Canadians about the event.

The 2020 tournament was cancelled due to the COVID-19 pandemic, while Canada did not participate in the 2021 tournament—with Germany replacing them. It was announced that this hosting cycle would be extended through 2023.

Due to the 2022 World Junior Championships being rescheduled for August in Edmonton shortly after the event, the 2022 Hlinka Gretzky Cup was played exclusively in Red Deer.

== Results ==
Year	Gold	Silver	Bronze	4th	Host Cities
1991	Soviet Union	Canada	United States	Japan	Sapporo / Yokohama, Japan
1992	Canada	Russia	Japan	United States	Tokyo, Japan
1993	Russia	United States	Canada	Japan	Yokohama, Japan
1994	Canada	United States	Russia	Japan	Mexico City, Mexico
1995	Russia	Canada	United States	Japan	Yokohama, Japan
1996	Canada	United States	Finland	Japan	Nelson / Castlegar, Canada
1997	Canada	Czech Republic	Slovakia	–	Jihlava / Žďár nad Sázavou / Znojmo, Czech Republic
1998	Canada	Czech Republic	Slovakia	Belarus	Bratislava / Trnava, Slovakia
1999	Canada	United States	Czech Republic	Slovakia	Havlíčkův Brod / Třebíč / Znojmo, Czech Republic
2000	Canada	United States	Czech Republic	Slovakia	Kežmarok, Slovakia
2001	Canada	Czech Republic	Russia	Switzerland	Kolín / Mladá Boleslav / Nymburk, Czech Republic
2002	Canada	Czech Republic	Russia	Switzerland	/ Břeclav, Czech Republic / Piešťany, Slovakia
2003	United States	Russia	Czech Republic	Canada	/ Břeclav, Czech Republic / Piešťany, Slovakia
2004	Canada	Czech Republic	Sweden	United States	/ Břeclav/Hodonín, Czech Republic / Piešťany, Slovakia
2005	Canada	Czech Republic	Finland	Russia	/ Břeclav, Czech Republic / Piešťany, Slovakia
2006	Canada	United States	Russia	Sweden	/ Břeclav, Czech Republic / Piešťany, Slovakia
2007	Sweden	Finland	Russia	Canada	/ Hodonín, Czech Republic / Piešťany, Slovakia
2008	Canada	Russia	Sweden	Finland	/ Piešťany, Slovakia / Břeclav, Czech Republic
2009	Canada	Russia	Sweden	United States	/ Břeclav, Czech Republic / Piešťany, Slovakia
2010	Canada	United States	Sweden	Czech Republic	/ Piešťany, Slovakia / Břeclav, Czech Republic
2011	Canada	Sweden	Russia	Finland	/ Břeclav, Czech Republic / Piešťany, Slovakia
2012	Canada	Finland	Sweden	Czech Republic	/ Piešťany, Slovakia / Břeclav, Czech Republic
2013	Canada	United States	Czech Republic	Russia	/ Piešťany, Slovakia / Břeclav, Czech Republic
2014	Canada	Czech Republic	United States	Sweden	/ Břeclav, Czech Republic / Piešťany, Slovakia
2015	Canada	Sweden	Russia	Finland	/ Břeclav, Czech Republic / Bratislava, Slovakia
2016	Czech Republic	United States	Russia	Sweden	/ Břeclav, Czech Republic / Bratislava, Slovakia
2017	Canada	Czech Republic	Sweden	Russia	/ Břeclav, Czech Republic / Bratislava, Slovakia
2018	Canada	Sweden	Russia	United States	Edmonton / Red Deer, Canada
2019	Russia	Canada	Sweden	Finland	/ Břeclav, Czech Republic / Piešťany, Slovakia
2020	Tournament cancelled due to COVID-19 pandemic.				Edmonton / Red Deer, Canada
2021	Russia	Slovakia	Sweden	Finland	/ Břeclav, Czech Republic / Piešťany, Slovakia
2022	Canada	Sweden	Finland	Czech Republic	Red Deer, Canada
2023	Canada	Czech Republic	United States	Finland	/ Břeclav, Czech Republic / Trenčín, Slovakia
2024	Canada	Czech Republic	Sweden	United States	Edmonton, Canada
2025	United States	Sweden	Canada	Finland	/ Brno, Czech Republic / Trenčín, Slovakia
2026	Canada	United States	Finland	Slovakia	Edmonton, Canada

== Medal leaders ==
Country	Gold	Silver	Bronze	Medals
Canada	26	3	2	31
Russia / Soviet Union	5	4	9	18
United States	2	10	4	16
Czech Republic	1	10	4	15
Sweden	1	5	9	15
Finland	0	2	4	6
Slovakia	0	1	2	3
Japan	0	0	1	1
Totals for 8 countries	34	34	34	–
