= 1992 Pacific Cup (ice hockey) =

Tournament details
- Host country: Japan
- Dates: 1–4 August 1992
- Teams: 4

Final positions
- Champions: Canada (1st title)

Tournament statistics
- Games played: 6
- Goals scored: 49 (8.17 per game)

The 1992 Pacific Cup was the second annual under-18 ice hockey tournament that is now known as the Hlinka Gretzky Cup, held in Tokyo, Japan from August 1–4, 1992. Canada captured their first gold medal after having finished as runners-up to the Soviet Union the previous year. They went undefeated in all three games of the tournament and defeated Russia 5–3 in the final and deciding game. Russia finished with the silver, Japan earned the bronze, while the United States, winless during the tournament, rounded out the four teams.

== Results ==
Japan	4–7	Russia

Canada	8–0	United States

Russia	4–1	United States

Canada	5–1	Japan

Japan	6–5	United States

Canada	5–3	Russia

== Final standings ==
Team	Pld	W	L	D	GF	GA	GD	Pts
Canada	3	3	0	0	18	4	+14	6
Russia	3	2	1	0	14	10	+4	4
Japan	3	1	2	0	11	17	−6	2
United States	3	0	3	0	6	18	−12	0

== See also ==
- 1992 World Junior Championships
