= Zimní stadion Břeclav =

Arena in Břeclav, Czech Republic

- Interactive map of Zimní stadion Břeclav
- Former names: (2006-2011) Alcaplast aréna
- Location: Pod Zámkem 2881/5, Břeclav, Czech Republic, 690 02
- Coordinates: 48.760234°N 16.874319°E
- Operator: Tereza Břeclav, p.o.
- Capacity: 4,039

Construction
- Groundbreaking: 1969
- Built: 1972
- Opened: 1972
- Renovated: 1995, 2003, 2007, 2008

Tenant
- HC Lvi Břeclav

Zimní stadion Břeclav (Břeclav city ice rink) is an arena in Břeclav, Czech Republic. It is primarily used for ice hockey and is the home arena of HC Lvi Břeclav. It is also a perennial host of the Ivan Hlinka Memorial Tournament. Built in 1972, it has a capacity of 4,039.
