= USA Hockey National Team Development Program =

USA Hockey training program

USA Hockey NTDP
- Nickname: Team USA
- Association: USA Hockey
- Head coach: Nick Fohr; Kevin Porter
- Home stadium: USA Hockey Arena
- Team colors
- IIHF code: USA
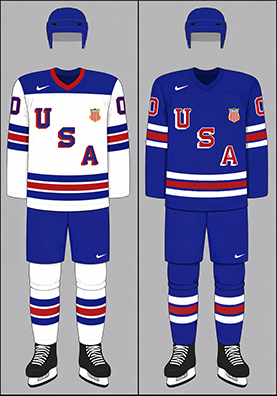

IIHF World U18 Championship
- Appearances: 27 (first in 1999)
- Best result: Gold: (2002, 2005, 2006, 2009, 2010, 2011, 2012, 2014, 2015, 2017, 2023)

Medal record

IIHF U18 World Championship
Gold medal – first place	2002 Slovakia	Team
Gold medal – first place	2005 Czech Republic	Team
Gold medal – first place	2006 Sweden	Team
Gold medal – first place	2009 United States	Team
Gold medal – first place	2010 Belarus	Team
Gold medal – first place	2011 Germany	Team
Gold medal – first place	2012 Czech Republic	Team
Gold medal – first place	2014 Finland	Team
Gold medal – first place	2015 Switzerland	Team
Gold medal – first place	2017 Slovakia	Team
Gold medal – first place	2023 Switzerland	Team
Silver medal – second place	2004 Belarus	Team
Silver medal – second place	2007 Finland	Team
Silver medal – second place	2013 Russia	Team
Silver medal – second place	2018 Russia	Team
Silver medal – second place	2022 Germany	Team
Silver medal – second place	2024 Finland	Team
Bronze medal – third place	2008 Russia	Team
Bronze medal – third place	2016 United States	Team
Bronze medal – third place	2019 Sweden	Team
Bronze medal – third place	2025 United States	Team

Hlinka Gretzky Cup
Gold medal – first place	2003 Czech Republic / Slovakia	Team
Gold medal – first place	2025 Czech Republic / Slovakia	Team
Silver medal – second place	1993 Japan	Team
Silver medal – second place	1994 Mexico	Team
Silver medal – second place	1996 Canada	Team
Silver medal – second place	1999 Czech Republic	Team
Silver medal – second place	2000 Slovakia	Team
Silver medal – second place	2006 Czech Republic / Slovakia	Team
Silver medal – second place	2010 Slovakia / Czech Republic	Team
Silver medal – second place	2013 Slovakia / Czech Republic	Team
Silver medal – second place	2016 Czech Republic / Slovakia	Team
Bronze medal – third place	1991 Japan	Team
Bronze medal – third place	1995 Japan	Team
Bronze medal – third place	2014 Czech Republic / Slovakia	Team
Bronze medal – third place	2023 Czech Republic / Slovakia	Team

The United States National Team Development Program (NTDP) represents the United States in the IIHF World U18 Championship. Additionally the team plays domestically against opponents in the United States Hockey League (under-17 and under-18 teams), the National Collegiate Athletic Association (under-18 team), and other international tournaments. The program was started in 1996 by USA Hockey as a way to identify elite ice hockey players under the age of 18, and centralize their training. There are two teams in the program: under-17 and under-18. Both teams are based in Plymouth, Michigan.

== History ==
The stated goal of the NTDP is "to prepare student-athletes under the age of 18 for participation on the U.S. National Teams and success in their future hockey careers. Its efforts focus not only on high-caliber participation on the ice, but creating well-rounded individuals off the ice". While enrolled in the NTDP, players stay with billet families.

From its founding until 2014–15, the program was based in Ann Arbor, Michigan, playing games at the Ann Arbor Ice Cube. However, following that season, the Plymouth Whalers of the OHL relocated, freeing up the what was then known as the Compuware Arena. USA Hockey purchased the facility from Peter Karmanos, renamed it the USA Hockey Arena and moved the NTDP to Plymouth.

The under-17 and under-18 teams play games domestically against opponents in the United States Hockey League (under-17 and under-18 teams) and the National Collegiate Athletic Association (under-18 team), as well as three international tournaments for each team plus occasional friendlies. The NTDP teams previously competed in the North American Hockey League until 2009.

The NTDP became part of the annual CHL/USA Prospects Challenge in 2024, a two-game series versus the Canadian Hockey League to showcase the talents of top prospects for the upcoming entry draft of the National Hockey League.

== Competitive record ==
=== IIHF U18 World Championship ===
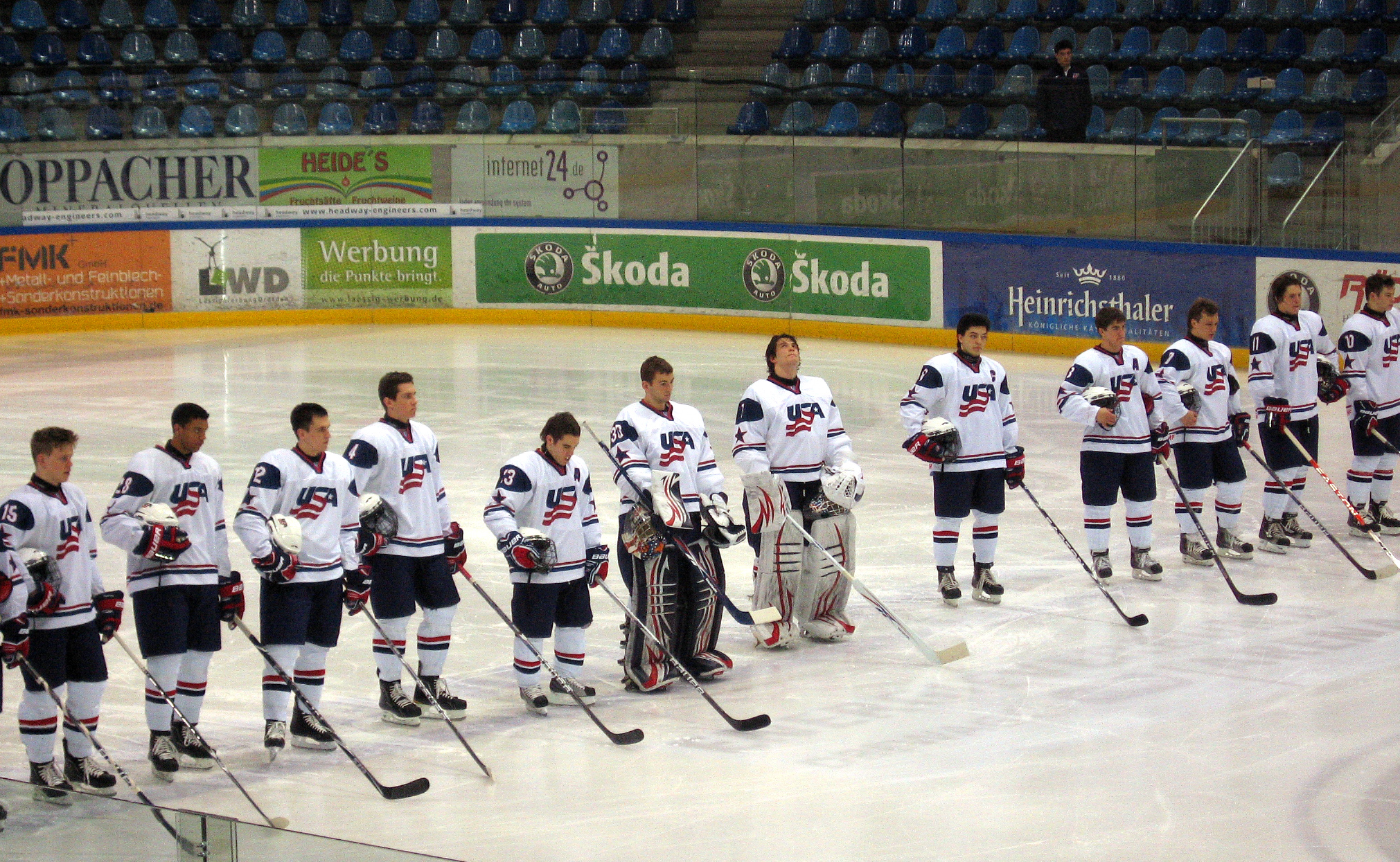
USA U18 Ice Hockey Team in 2011

The United States has won 11 gold medals in IIHF World U18 Championship.

Year	Result	Rank	GP	W	OTW	OTL	L	GF	GA	Pts
(Germany) 1999	First round	7th place	7	4	0	0	3	38	17	8
(Switzerland) 2000	Preliminary round	8th place	5	2	0	0	3	22	14	4
(Finland) 2001	Quarterfinals	6th place	6	3	0	1	2	28	14	6
(Slovakia) 2002	Champions	1st place, gold medalist(s)	8	7	0	0	1	46	10	14
(Russia) 2003	Semi finals	4th place	6	3	0	0	2	12	9	7
(Belarus) 2004	Runner-up	2nd place, silver medalist(s)	6	5	0	0	1	27	10	10
(Czech Republic) 2005	Champions	1st place, gold medalist(s)	6	6	0	0	0	28	8	12
(Sweden) 2006	Champions	1st place, gold medalist(s)	6	5	1	0	0	37	7	11
(Finland) 2007	Runner-up	2nd place, silver medalist(s)	7	3	1	1	2	38	20	12
(Russia) 2008	Third place	3rd place, bronze medalist(s)	7	5	0	0	2	31	19	15
(United States) 2009	Champions	1st place, gold medalist(s)	7	6	0	0	1	42	12	18
(Belarus) 2010	Champions	1st place, gold medalist(s)	7	6	0	0	1	33	7	18
(Germany) 2011	Champions	1st place, gold medalist(s)	6	4	2	0	0	30	15	16
(Czech Republic) 2012	Champions	1st place, gold medalist(s)	6	6	0	0	0	27	4	18
(Russia) 2013	Runner-up	2nd place, silver medalist(s)	7	3	1	0	3	25	16	11
(Finland) 2014	Champions	1st place, gold medalist(s)	7	6	0	0	1	31	12	18
(Switzerland) 2015	Champions	1st place, gold medalist(s)	7	5	1	0	1	46	13	17
(United States) 2016	Third place	3rd place, bronze medalist(s)	7	6	0	0	1	50	11	18
(Slovakia) 2017	Champions	1st place, gold medalist(s)	7	6	1	0	0	34	14	20
(Russia) 2018	Runner-up	2nd place, silver medalist(s)	7	4	0	0	3	32	19	12
(Sweden) 2019	Third place	3rd place, bronze medalist(s)	7	6	0	1	0	44	15	19
2020	Cancelled due to the COVID-19 pandemic									
(United States) 2021	Quarterfinals	5th place	5	1	2	1	1	20	20	8
(Germany) 2022	Runner-up	2nd place, silver medalist(s)	6	5	0	0	1	47	17	15
(Switzerland) 2023	Champions	1st place, gold medalist(s)	7	6	1	0	0	51	10	20
(Finland) 2024	Runner-up	2nd place, silver medalist(s)	7	6	0	0	1	48	15	18
(United States) 2025	Third place	3rd place, bronze medalist(s)	7	5	1	0	1	38	18	17
(Slovakia) 2026	Quarterfinals	5th place	5	3	0	1	1	26	11	10
Total	11 Titles	27/28	176	127	11	5	32	931	357	372

=== Hlinka Gretzky Cup ===
Team USA most recently won the Hlinka Gretzky Cup in 2025, its second championship.

Year	Result	Rank	GP	W	OTW	OTL	L	GF	GA	Pts
(Japan) 1991	Third place	3rd place, bronze medalist(s)								
(Japan) 1992	Semifinals	4th place	3	0	0	0	3	6	18	0
(Japan) 1993	Runner-up	2nd place, silver medalist(s)								
(Mexico) 1994	Runner-up	2nd place, silver medalist(s)								
(Japan) 1995	Third place	3rd place, bronze medalist(s)								
(Canada) 1996	Runner-up	2nd place, silver medalist(s)								
(Czech Republic) 1997	Did not participate									
(Slovakia) 1998	Did not participate									
(Czech Republic) 1999	Runner-up	2nd place, silver medalist(s)								
(Slovakia) 2000	Runner-up	2nd place, silver medalist(s)								
(Czech Republic) 2001	Did not participate									
(Czech Republic) / (Slovakia) 2002	Preliminary round	5th place								
(Czech Republic) / (Slovakia) 2003	Champions	1st place, gold medalist(s)	5	4	1	0	0	20	10	9
(Czech Republic) / (Slovakia) 2004	Semifinals	4th place	5	2	0	0	3	7	15	6
(Czech Republic) / (Slovakia) 2005	Preliminary round	5th place	3	1	0	0	1	11	11	4
(Czech Republic) / (Slovakia) 2006	Runner-up	2nd place, silver medalist(s)	4	2	1	0	1	11	11	8
(Czech Republic) / (Slovakia) 2007	Preliminary round	5th place	4	2	0	0	2	17	18	6
(Slovakia) / (Czech Republic) 2008	Preliminary round	7th place	4	1	0	0	3	14	21	3
(Czech Republic) / (Slovakia) 2009	Semifinals	4th place	4	2	0	0	2	15	21	6
(Slovakia) / (Czech Republic) 2010	Runner-up	2nd place, silver medalist(s)	5	2	1	1	1	18	15	9
(Czech Republic) / (Slovakia) 2011	Preliminary round	5th place	4	1	2	0	1	16	16	7
(Slovakia) / (Czech Republic) 2012	Preliminary round	7th place	4	1	0	1	2	14	18	4
(Slovakia) / (Czech Republic) 2013	Runner-up	2nd place, silver medalist(s)	5	3	0	1	1	16	14	10
(Czech Republic) / (Slovakia) 2014	Third place	3rd place, bronze medalist(s)	5	2	1	0	2	28	27	8
(Czech Republic) / (Slovakia) 2015	Preliminary round	5th place	4	2	0	0	2	14	16	6
(Czech Republic) / (Slovakia) 2016	Runner-up	2nd place, silver medalist(s)	5	2	2	0	1	19	15	10
(Czech Republic) / (Slovakia) 2017	Preliminary round	5th place	4	1	1	0	2	10	17	5
(Canada) 2018	Semifinals	4th place	5	2	0	1	2	24	21	7
(Czech Republic) / (Slovakia) 2019	Preliminary round	6th place	4	0	1	2	1	13	18	4
(Canada) 2020	Cancelled due to COVID-19 pandemic.									
(Czech Republic) / (Slovakia) 2021	Preliminary round	5th place	4	2	0	0	2	21	14	6
(Canada) 2022	Preliminary round	5th place	4	2	0	0	2	14	10	6
(Czech Republic) / (Slovakia) 2023	Third place	3rd place, bronze medalist(s)	5	3	0	0	2	23	18	9
(Canada) 2024	Semifinals	4th place	5	2	0	0	3	20	17	6
(Czech Republic) / (Slovakia) 2025	Champions	1st place, gold medalist(s)	5	3	1	0	1	25	15	11
Total	2 Titles	31/35	—N/a							

== Notable alumni ==
Since 1999, and through the 2025 NHL draft, 432 NTDP alumni have been drafted by the National Hockey League (NHL) including 103 first round picks. This includes Rick DiPietro, Erik Johnson, Patrick Kane, Auston Matthews, and Jack Hughes, all of whom were drafted first overall in the NHL entry draft. At the 2007 NHL entry draft, NTDP alumni Patrick Kane and James van Riemsdyk were selected first and second overall respectively, the first American-born players selected with the top two picks. Seventeen players were selected from the NTDP in the 2019 NHL entry draft.

At the 2026 Winter Olympics, 17 of the 25 players on the United States men's roster were NTDP alumni. The team defeated Canada 2–1 in overtime to win the program's first Olympic gold medal since the 1980 "Miracle on Ice" team, with the game winning overtime goal from NTDP alumnus Jack Hughes.
