= Jesper Eriksson =

Swedish ice hockey player (born 1996)

- Born: August 14, 1996 (age 29) Kiruna, Sweden
- Height: 6 ft 0 in (183 cm)
- Weight: 187 lb (85 kg; 13 st 5 lb)
- Position: Goaltender
- Caught: Right
- Played for: Skellefteå AIK
- Playing career: 2014–2024

Jesper Eriksson (born August 14, 1996) is a Swedish former professional ice hockey goaltender. He played with Skellefteå AIK in the Swedish Hockey League (SHL).

Eriksson made his SHL debut playing with Skellefteå AIK during the 2014–15 SHL season.
