= Yuri Klyuchnikov (ice hockey) =

Russian ice hockey player

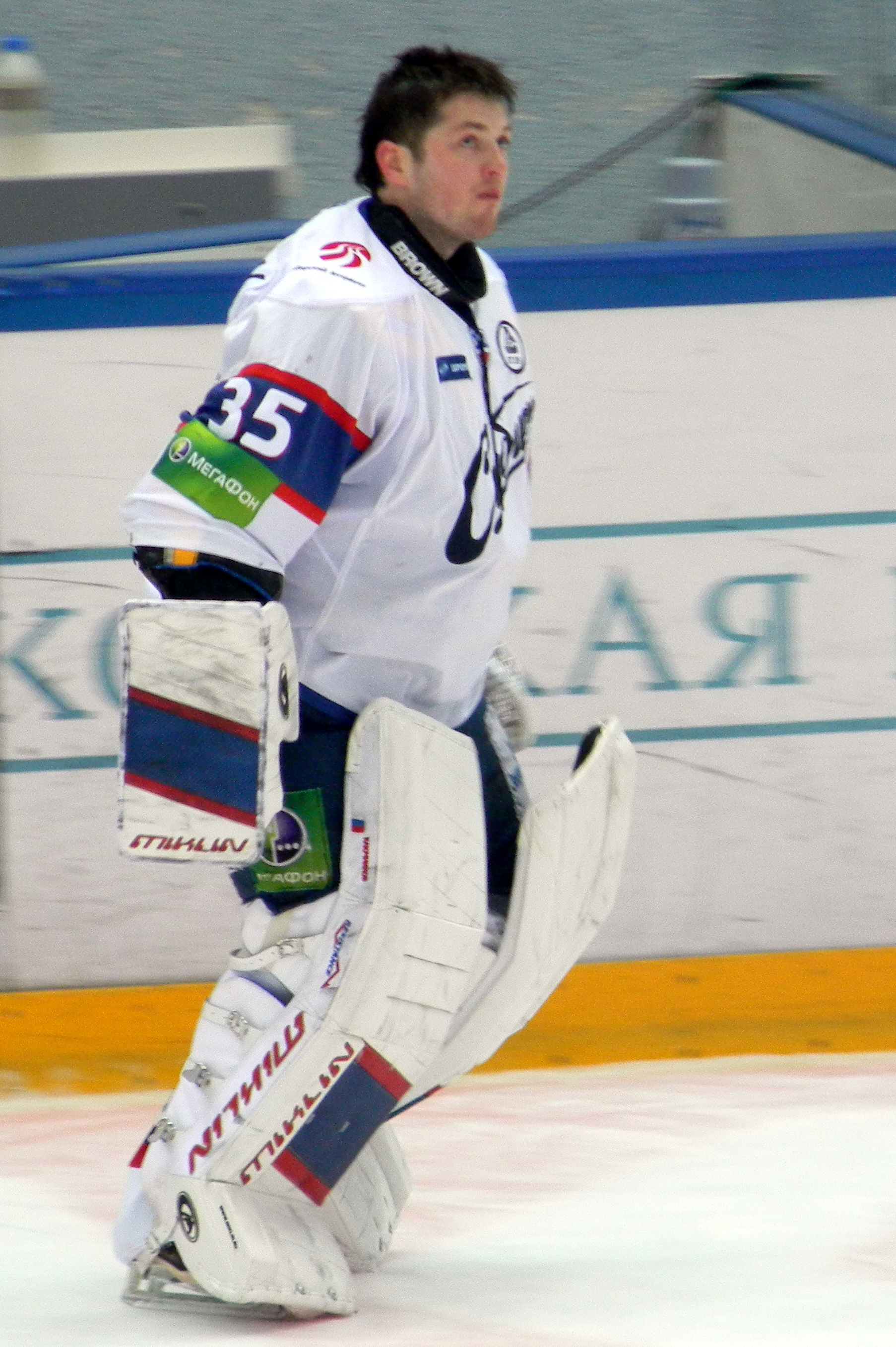
- Born: September 17, 1983 (age 41); Moscow, Russia
- Height: 5 ft 9 in (175 cm)
- Weight: 172 lb (78 kg; 12 st 4 lb)
- Position: Goaltender
- Catches: Left
- KHL team Former teams: Lokomotiv Yaroslavl; HC Sibir Novosibirsk
- NHL draft: Undrafted
- Playing career: 2001–present

Yuri Viktorovich Klyuchnikov (born September 17, 1983) is a Russian professional ice hockey goaltender who currently plays for HC Sibir Novosibirsk of the Kontinental Hockey League (KHL).
