= Canada men's national under-18 ice hockey team =

Canadian youth national hockey team

Canada
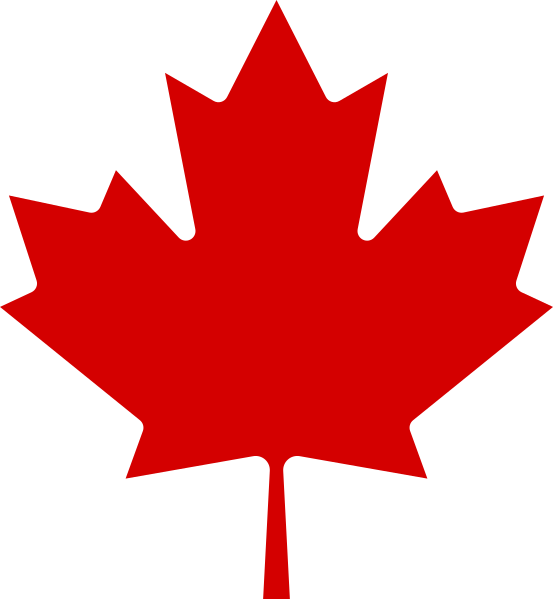
- Nickname: Team Canada (Équipe Canada)
- Association: Hockey Canada
- Head coach: Alan Letang
- Assistants: Sylvain Favreau; Kris Mallette
- Top scorer: Jeff Friesen (9)
- Team colours
- IIHF code: CAN

First international
- Russia 8 – 4 Canada (Piešťany, Slovakia; April 11, 2002)

Biggest win
- Canada 15 – 1 Denmark (České Budějovice, Czech Republic; April 18, 2005)

Biggest defeat
- Canada 0 – 8 Sweden (Porrentruy, Switzerland; April 20, 2023)

IIHF World U18 Championship
- Appearances: 21 (first in 2002)
- Best result: (gold) Gold: 6 (2003, 2008, 2013, 2021, 2024, 2025)

Medal record

World U18 Championships
Gold medal – first place	2003 Russia	Canada
Gold medal – first place	2008 Russia	Canada
Gold medal – first place	2013 Russia	Canada
Gold medal – first place	2021 USA	Canada
Gold medal – first place	2024 Finland	Canada
Gold medal – first place	2025 United States	Canada
Silver medal – second place	2005 Czech Republic	Canada
Bronze medal – third place	2012 Czech Republic	Canada
Bronze medal – third place	2014 Finland	Canada
Bronze medal – third place	2015 Switzerland	Canada
Bronze medal – third place	2023 Switzerland	Canada

Hlinka Gretzky Cup
Gold medal – first place	1992	Canada
Gold medal – first place	1994	Canada
Gold medal – first place	1996	Canada
Gold medal – first place	1997	Canada
Gold medal – first place	1998	Canada
Gold medal – first place	1999	Canada
Gold medal – first place	2000	Canada
Gold medal – first place	2001	Canada
Gold medal – first place	2002	Canada
Gold medal – first place	2004	Canada
Gold medal – first place	2005	Canada
Gold medal – first place	2006	Canada
Gold medal – first place	2008	Canada
Gold medal – first place	2009	Canada
Gold medal – first place	2010	Canada
Gold medal – first place	2011	Canada
Gold medal – first place	2012	Canada
Gold medal – first place	2013	Canada
Gold medal – first place	2014	Canada
Gold medal – first place	2015	Canada
Gold medal – first place	2017	Canada
Gold medal – first place	2018	Canada
Gold medal – first place	2022	Canada
Gold medal – first place	2023	Canada
Gold medal – first place	2024	Canada
Gold medal – first place	2026	Canada
Silver medal – second place	1991	Canada
Silver medal – second place	1995	Canada
Silver medal – second place	2019	Canada
Bronze medal – third place	1993	Canada
Bronze medal – third place	2025	Canada

The Canadian men's national under 18 ice hockey team is part of a three-stage Program of Excellence beginning with the Under-17 regional teams and ending with the National Junior Team. The primary objectives of the Under-18 program are to identify, evaluate, and condition players to the rigors of international competition by giving first exposure to off-shore officiating, ice-surfaces, and travel.

The Under-18 squad traditionally competes in the month of August, during the off season, to allow players to further develop skills with their respective junior teams in the winter following a week-long camp. A 22-player roster is chosen by scouts and coaches from Hockey Canada to represent Canada on the international stage.

The first National Men's Under-18 Team was created in 1981 with the development of the Program of Excellence and has since competed in many international competitions. For the first 10 years of the program, the National Men's Under-18 Team participated in exchange camps with the United States to provide both countries the opportunity to refine the skills of their most gifted young players against top caliber international competition. It was not until the Japanese Ice Hockey Federation introduced the Phoenix Cup, a four-nation tournament designed to improve Japan's international hockey program, in 1991 that Canada took part in an international tournament.

The Phoenix Cup (later the Pacific Cup and La Copa Mexico) was a single round robin competition between the national under-18 teams of Canada, Russia, Japan, and the United States. It was competed for between 1991 and 1996, with tournaments in Japan, Mexico City, and Nelson, B.C. In its six-year history, Canada took home three gold medals, two silver and one bronze.

In 1997, the National Men's Under-18 Team competed against Slovakia and the Czech Republic in a three-nation tournament in the Czech Republic. Canada captured gold and repeated their performance the following year in Slovakia against Belarus, Slovakia, and the Czech Republic.

Since 2002, Canada's National Men's Under-18 Team has taken part in the IIHF World Under-18 Championship, winning four gold medals (2003, 2008, 2013 and 2021), one silver medal (2005), and three bronze medals (2012, 2014, and 2015).

== Roster ==
=== IIHF U18 World Championships roster ===
Roster for the 2025 IIHF World U18 Championships.

Head coach: Cory Stillman

No.	Pos.	Name	Height	Weight	Birthdate	Team
1	G	Jack Ivankovic	1.8 m (5 ft 11 in)	77 kg (170 lb)	May 22, 2007 (age 19)	(Canada) Brampton Steelheads
2	D	Xavier Villeneuve	1.78 m (5 ft 10 in)	72 kg (159 lb)	September 29, 2007 (age 19)	(Canada) Blainville-Boisbriand Armada
3	D	Jackson Smith	1.91 m (6 ft 3 in)	88 kg (194 lb)	May 13, 2007 (age 19)	(United States) Tri-City Americans
4	D	Ryan Lin	1.8 m (5 ft 11 in)	77 kg (170 lb)	April 18, 2008 (age 18)	(Canada) Vancouver Giants
5	D	Carson Carels	1.85 m (6 ft 1 in)	86 kg (190 lb)	July 23, 2008 (age 18)	(Canada) Prince George Cougars
6	D	Alex Huang	1.83 m (6 ft 0 in)	73 kg (161 lb)	July 30, 2007 (age 19)	(Canada) Chicoutimi Saguenéens
7	F	Cole Reschny – A	1.78 m (5 ft 10 in)	85 kg (187 lb)	April 6, 2007 (age 19)	(Canada) Victoria Royals
10	D	Quinn Beauchesne	1.83 m (6 ft 0 in)	83 kg (183 lb)	March 1, 2007 (age 19)	(Canada) Guelph Storm
11	F	Alessandro Di Iorio	1.83 m (6 ft 0 in)	84 kg (185 lb)	March 17, 2008 (age 18)	(Canada) Sarnia Sting
12	F	Ethan Czata	1.85 m (6 ft 1 in)	79 kg (174 lb)	May 29, 2007 (age 19)	(Canada) Niagara Ice Dogs
13	F	Tyler Hopkins	1.83 m (6 ft 0 in)	82 kg (181 lb)	January 23, 2007 (age 19)	(Canada) Kingston Frontenacs
14	F	Liam Kilfoil	1.8 m (5 ft 11 in)	80 kg (180 lb)	March 21, 2007 (age 19)	(Canada) Halifax Mooseheads
15	F	Lukas Sawchyn	1.78 m (5 ft 10 in)	77 kg (170 lb)	February 27, 2007 (age 19)	(Canada) Edmonton Oil Kings
16	F	Lev Katsin	1.73 m (5 ft 8 in)	76 kg (168 lb)	May 13, 2007 (age 19)	(Canada) Guelph Storm
18	F	Beckham Edwards	1.83 m (6 ft 0 in)	80 kg (180 lb)	January 6, 2008 (age 18)	(Canada) Sarnia Sting
19	F	Cameron Schmidt	1.7 m (5 ft 7 in)	73 kg (161 lb)	April 18, 2007 (age 19)	(Canada) Vancouver Giants
20	D	Keaton Verhoeff	1.93 m (6 ft 4 in)	96 kg (212 lb)	June 19, 2008 (age 18)	(Canada) Victoria Royals
22	F	Jack Nesbitt	1.93 m (6 ft 4 in)	83 kg (183 lb)	January 12, 2007 (age 19)	(Canada) Windsor Spitfires
24	F	Braeden Cootes – C	1.8 m (5 ft 11 in)	83 kg (183 lb)	February 9, 2007 (age 19)	(United States) Seattle Thunderbirds
25	D	Daxon Rudolph	1.85 m (6 ft 1 in)	88 kg (194 lb)	March 6, 2008 (age 18)	(Canada) Prince Albert Raiders
26	F	Ryan Roobroeck	1.88 m (6 ft 2 in)	95 kg (209 lb)	September 25, 2007 (age 19)	(Canada) Niagara Ice Dogs
27	F	Matthew Gard	1.93 m (6 ft 4 in)	87 kg (192 lb)	April 7, 2007 (age 19)	(Canada) Red Deer Rebels
28	F	Brady Martin – A	1.83 m (6 ft 0 in)	84 kg (185 lb)	March 16, 2007 (age 19)	(Canada) Sault Ste. Marie Greyhounds
29	G	Lucas Beckman	1.88 m (6 ft 2 in)	88 kg (194 lb)	August 23, 2007 (age 19)	(Canada) Baie-Comeau Drakkar
30	G	Burke Hood	1.91 m (6 ft 3 in)	92 kg (203 lb)	April 30, 2007 (age 19)	(Canada) Vancouver Giants

=== Hlinka Gretzky Cup roster ===
Roster for the 2025 Hlinka Gretzky Cup.

Head coach: Mathieu Turcotte

No.	Pos.	Name	Height	Weight	Birthdate	Team
1	G	Jason Schaubel	1.8 m (5 ft 11 in)	78 kg (172 lb)	August 30, 2008 (age 18)	(Canada) Kitchener Rangers
2	D	Cameron Chartrand	1.83 m (6 ft 0 in)	92 kg (203 lb)	March 3, 2008 (age 18)	(Canada) Saint John Sea Dogs
3	D	Keaton Verhoeff – C	1.91 m (6 ft 3 in)	94 kg (207 lb)	June 19, 2008 (age 18)	(United States) University of North Dakota
4	D	Ryan Lin	1.8 m (5 ft 11 in)	80 kg (180 lb)	April 18, 2008 (age 18)	(Canada) Vancouver Giants
5	D	Carson Carels	1.86 m (6 ft 1 in)	88 kg (194 lb)	June 23, 2008 (age 18)	(Canada) Prince George Cougars
7	D	Giorgos Pantelas	1.87 m (6 ft 2 in)	97 kg (214 lb)	April 24, 2008 (age 18)	(Canada) Brandon Wheat Kings
8	D	Callum Croskery	1.84 m (6 ft 0 in)	80 kg (180 lb)	January 29, 2008 (age 18)	(Canada) Sault Ste. Marie Greyhounds
9	D	Landon DuPont – A	1.8 m (5 ft 11 in)	85 kg (187 lb)	May 28, 2009 (age 17)	(United States) Everett Silvertips
11	F	Tynan Lawrence	1.84 m (6 ft 0 in)	83 kg (183 lb)	August 3, 2008 (age 18)	(United States) Muskegon Lumberjacks
12	F	Liam Ruck	1.8 m (5 ft 11 in)	79 kg (174 lb)	February 21, 2008 (age 18)	(Canada) Medicine Hat Tigers
14	F	Mathis Preston	1.79 m (5 ft 10 in)	80 kg (180 lb)	July 21, 2008 (age 18)	(United States) Spokane Chiefs
15	F	Cooper Williams	1.83 m (6 ft 0 in)	75 kg (165 lb)	February 18, 2008 (age 18)	(Canada) Saskatoon Blades
16	F	Ethan Belchetz	1.94 m (6 ft 4 in)	103 kg (227 lb)	March 30, 2008 (age 18)	(Canada) Windsor Spitfires
17	F	Alessandro Di Iorio – A	1.82 m (6 ft 0 in)	85 kg (187 lb)	March 17, 2008 (age 18)	(Canada) Sarnia Sting
18	F	Beckham Edwards	1.84 m (6 ft 0 in)	81 kg (179 lb)	January 6, 2008 (age 18)	(Canada) Sarnia Sting
19	F	Adam Valentini – A	1.75 m (5 ft 9 in)	86 kg (190 lb)	April 11, 2008 (age 18)	(Canada) Kitchener Rangers
21	F	Pierce Mbuyi	1.77 m (5 ft 10 in)	71 kg (157 lb)	April 17, 2008 (age 18)	(Canada) Owen Sound Attack
22	F	Jean-Cristoph Lemieux	1.81 m (5 ft 11 in)	85 kg (187 lb)	June 19, 2008 (age 18)	(Canada) Windsor Spitfires
24	F	Dimian Zhilkin	1.77 m (5 ft 10 in)	78 kg (172 lb)	October 21, 2008 (age 18)	(United States) Saginaw Spirit
25	D	Daxon Rudolph – A	1.87 m (6 ft 2 in)	92 kg (203 lb)	March 6, 2008 (age 18)	(Canada) Prince Albert Raiders
26	F	Markus Ruck	1.8 m (5 ft 11 in)	75 kg (165 lb)	February 21, 2008 (age 18)	(Canada) Medicine Hat Tigers
27	F	Colin Fitzgerald	1.89 m (6 ft 2 in)	94 kg (207 lb)	April 1, 2008 (age 18)	(Canada) Peterborough Petes
29	F	Thomas Rousseau	1.78 m (5 ft 10 in)	77 kg (170 lb)	February 12, 2008 (age 18)	(Canada) Sherbrooke Phoenix
30	G	Carter Esler	1.77 m (5 ft 10 in)	75 kg (165 lb)	November 28, 2008 (age 17)	(United States) Spokane Chiefs
31	G	Gavin Betts	1.81 m (5 ft 11 in)	78 kg (172 lb)	April 3, 2008 (age 18)	(Canada) Kingston Frontenacs

== International competitions ==
=== IIHF World U18 Championships ===
- 1999: Did not compete
- 2000: Did not compete
- 2001: Did not compete
- 2002: 6th place
- 2003: (gold) Gold
- 2004: 4th place
- 2005: (silver) Silver
- 2006: 4th place
- 2007: 4th place
- 2008: (gold) Gold
- 2009: 4th place
- 2010: 7th place
- 2011: 4th place
- 2012: (bronze) Bronze
- 2013: (gold) Gold
- 2014: (bronze) Bronze
- 2015: (bronze) Bronze
- 2016: 4th place
- 2017: 5th place
- 2018: 5th place
- 2019: 4th place
- 2020:Cancelled due to the COVID-19 pandemic
- 2021: (gold) Gold
- 2022: 5th place
- 2023: (bronze) Bronze
- 2024: (gold) Gold
- 2025: (gold) Gold
- 2026: 6th place

=== Hlinka Gretzky Cup ===
- 1991: (silver) Silver
- 1992: (gold) Gold
- 1993: (bronze) Bronze
- 1994: (gold) Gold
- 1995: (silver) Silver
- 1996: (gold) Gold
- 1997: (gold) Gold
- 1998: (gold) Gold
- 1999: (gold) Gold
- 2000: (gold) Gold
- 2001: (gold) Gold
- 2002: (gold) Gold
- 2003: 4th place
- 2004: (gold) Gold
- 2005: (gold) Gold
- 2006: (gold) Gold
- 2007: 4th place
- 2008: (gold) Gold
- 2009: (gold) Gold
- 2010: (gold) Gold
- 2011: (gold) Gold
- 2012: (gold) Gold
- 2013: (gold) Gold
- 2014: (gold) Gold
- 2015: (gold) Gold
- 2016: 5th place
- 2017: (gold) Gold
- 2018: (gold) Gold
- 2019: (silver) Silver
- 2021: Did not compete
- 2022: (gold) Gold
- 2023: (gold) Gold
- 2024: (gold) Gold
- 2025: (bronze) Bronze
