= Czechia men's national under-18 ice hockey team =

Youth sports team

Czech Republic
- Association: Czech Ice Hockey Association
- General manager: Petr Studnička
- Head coach: Jakub Petr
- Assistants: Darek Stránský, Radim Skuhrovec
- Captain: Eduard Šalé
- Team colors
- IIHF code: CZE

IIHF World U18 Championship
- Appearances: 19 (first in 1999)
- Best result: Silver: 1 - 2014

Medal record

World U18 Championships
Silver medal – second place	2014 Finland	
Bronze medal – third place	2002 Slovakia	
Bronze medal – third place	2004 Belarus	
Bronze medal – third place	2006 Sweden	
Bronze medal – third place	2026 Slovakia	

IIHF European Junior Championships
Bronze medal – third place	1993 Poland	
Bronze medal – third place	1994 Finland	

World U-17 Hockey Challenge
Silver medal – second place	1998 I Canada	
Bronze medal – third place	2006 Canada	
Bronze medal – third place	2017 Canada	

European Youth Olympic Winter Festival
Gold medal – first place	2005 Switzerland	Team
Gold medal – first place	2019 Bosnia and Herzegovina	Team
Silver medal – second place	2015 Austria\Liechtenstein	Team
Bronze medal – third place	2025 Georgia	Team

The Czech Republic men's national under-18 ice hockey team is the men's national under-18 ice hockey team of the Czech Republic. The team is controlled by the Czech Ice Hockey Association, a member of the International Ice Hockey Federation. The team represents the Czech Republic at the IIHF World U18 Championships.

== International competitions ==
=== IIHF European U18 Championships ===
- 1993: (bronze) 3rd place
- 1994: (bronze) 3rd place
- 1995: 5th place
- 1996: 5th place
- 1997: 5th place
- 1998: 4th place

=== IIHF World U18 Championships ===
- 1999: 5th place
- 2000: 6th place
- 2001: 4th place
- 2002: (bronze) 3rd place
- 2003: 6th place
- 2004: (bronze) 3rd place
- 2005: 4th place
- 2006: (bronze) 3rd place
- 2007: 9th place
- 2008: 1st in Division I Group A
- 2009: 6th place
- 2010: 6th place
- 2011: 8th place
- 2012: 8th place
- 2013: 7th place
- 2014: (silver) 2nd place
- 2015: 6th place
- 2016: 7th place
- 2017: 7th place
- 2018: 4th place
- 2019: 6th place
- 2020: Cancelled due to the COVID-19 pandemic
- 2021: 7th place
- 2022: 4th place
- 2023: 7th place
- 2024: 6th place
- 2025: 7th place
- 2026: (bronze) 3rd place

=== Hlinka Gretzky Cup ===
- 1991-1996: Did not compete
- 1997: (silver) Silver
- 1998: (silver) Silver
- 1999: (bronze) Bronze
- 2000: (bronze) Bronze
- 2001: (silver) Silver
- 2002: (silver) Silver
- 2003: (bronze) Bronze
- 2004: (silver) Silver
- 2005: (silver) Silver
- 2006: 5th place
- 2007: 6th place
- 2008: 5th place
- 2009: 5th place
- 2010: 4th place
- 2011: 6th place
- 2012: 4th place
- 2013: (bronze) Bronze
- 2014: (silver) Silver
- 2015: 6th place
- 2016: (gold) Gold
- 2017: (silver) Silver
- 2018: 5th place
- 2019: 5th place
- 2021: 6th place
- 2022: 4th place
- 2023: (silver) Silver
- 2024: (silver) Silver
- 2025: 5th place
