= Russia men's national under-18 ice hockey team =

Ice hockey team of Russia

Russia
- The coat of arms of Russia is the badge used on the players jerseys.
- Association: Russian Hockey Federation
- Team colors
- IIHF code: RUS
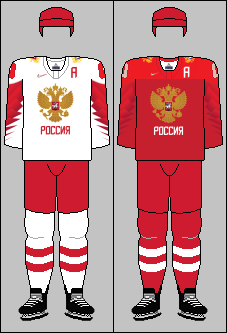

First international
- Russia 10–0 Poland (Lillehammer, Norway; 5 April 1992)

Biggest win
- Russia 18–1 Belarus (Kloten, Switzerland; 16 April 2000)

Biggest defeat
- Russia 2–11 Czech Republic ( Břeclav, Czech Republic; 13 April 2014)

IIHF World U18 Championship
- Appearances: 23 (first in 1999)
- Best result: Gold: 2001, 2004, 2007

The Russia men's national under-18 ice hockey team is the men's national under-18 ice hockey team of Russia. The team is controlled by the Ice Hockey Federation of Russia, a member of the International Ice Hockey Federation. The team represents Russia at the IIHF World U18 Championships.

Medal record

World U18 Championships
Gold medal – first place	2001 Finland	
Gold medal – first place	2004 Belarus	
Gold medal – first place	2007 Finland	
Silver medal – second place	2000 Switzerland	
Silver medal – second place	2002 Slovakia	
Silver medal – second place	2008 Russia	
Silver medal – second place	2009 United States	
Silver medal – second place	2019 Sweden	
Silver medal – second place	2021 United States	
Bronze medal – third place	2003 Russia	
Bronze medal – third place	2011 Germany	
Bronze medal – third place	2017 Slovakia	

Hlinka Gretzky Cup
Gold medal – first place	1993 Japan	
Gold medal – first place	1995 Japan	
Gold medal – first place	2019 Czech Republic/Slovakia	
Gold medal – first place	2021 Czech Republic/Slovakia	
Silver medal – second place	1992 Japan	
Silver medal – second place	2003 Czech Republic/Slovakia	
Silver medal – second place	2008 Czech Republic/Slovakia	
Silver medal – second place	2009 Czech Republic/Slovakia	
Bronze medal – third place	1994 Mexico	
Bronze medal – third place	2001 Czech Republic	
Bronze medal – third place	2002 Czech Republic/Slovakia	
Bronze medal – third place	2006 Czech Republic/Slovakia	
Bronze medal – third place	2007 Czech Republic/Slovakia	
Bronze medal – third place	2011 Czech Republic/Slovakia	
Bronze medal – third place	2015 Czech Republic/Slovakia	
Bronze medal – third place	2016 Czech Republic/Slovakia	
Bronze medal – third place	2018 Canada	

World U-17 Hockey Challenge
Gold medal – first place	2000 Canada	
Gold medal – first place	2012 Canada	
Gold medal – first place	2014 Canada	
Gold medal – first place	2018 Canada	
Gold medal – first place	2019 Canada	
Silver medal – second place	1986 Canada	
Silver medal – second place	2013 Canada	
Silver medal – second place	2015 Canada	
Bronze medal – third place	1990 Canada	
Bronze medal – third place	2014 Canada	
Bronze medal – third place	2016 Canada	

== International competitions ==
=== IIHF European U18 Championships ===
- 1992: (bronze) Bronze
- 1993: (silver) Silver
- 1994: (silver) Silver
- 1995: 4th place
- 1996: (gold) Gold
- 1997: 4th place
- 1998: (bronze) Bronze

=== IIHF World U18 Championships ===
- 1999: 6th place
- 2000: (silver) Silver
- 2001: (gold) Gold
- 2002: (silver) Silver
- 2003: (bronze) Bronze
- 2004: (gold) Gold
- 2005: 5th place
- 2006: 5th place
- 2007: (gold) Gold
- 2008: (silver) Silver
- 2009: (silver) Silver
- 2010: 4th place
- 2011: (bronze) Bronze
- 2012: 4th place
- 2013: 4th place
- 2014: 5th place
- 2015: 5th place
- 2016: 6th place
- 2017: (bronze) Bronze
- 2018: 6th place
- 2019: (silver) Silver
- 2020:Cancelled due to the COVID-19 pandemic
- 2021: (silver) Silver
- 2022: Expelled
- 2023: Expelled
- 2024: Expelled
- 2025: Expelled
- 2026: Expelled

=== Hlinka Gretzky Cup ===
- 1992: (silver) Silver
- 1993: (gold) Gold
- 1994: (bronze) Bronze
- 1995: (gold) Gold
- 1996: Did not compete
- 1997: Did not compete
- 1998: Did not compete
- 1999: Did not compete
- 2000: Did not compete
- 2001: (bronze) Bronze
- 2002: (bronze) Bronze
- 2003: (silver) Silver
- 2004: 5th place
- 2005: 4th place
- 2006: (bronze) Bronze
- 2007: (bronze) Bronze
- 2008: (silver) Silver
- 2009: (silver) Silver
- 2010: 5th place
- 2011: (bronze) Bronze
- 2012: 5th place
- 2013: 4th place
- 2014: 7th place
- 2015: (bronze) Bronze
- 2016: (bronze) Bronze
- 2017: 4th place
- 2018: (bronze) Bronze
- 2019: (gold) Gold
- 2021: (gold) Gold
- 2022–present: Expelled
