= Switzerland men's national under-18 ice hockey team =

Swiss ice hockey team

The Switzerland men's national under-18 ice hockey team is the men's national under-18 ice hockey team of Switzerland. The team is controlled by the Swiss Ice Hockey Association, a member of the International Ice Hockey Federation. The team represents Switzerland at the IIHF World U18 Championships.

== International competitions ==
=== IIHF World U18 Championships ===
- 1999: 4th place
- 2000: 4th place
- 2001: (silver) 2nd place
- 2002: 7th place
- 2003: 9th place
- 2004: 1st in Division I Group A
- 2005: 9th place
- 2006: 1st in Division I Group A
- 2007: 6th place
- 2008: 8th place
- 2009: 8th place
- 2010: 5th place
- 2011: 7th place
- 2012: 7th place
- 2013: 6th place
- 2014: 7th place
- 2015: 4th place
- 2016: 8th place
- 2017: 8th place
- 2018: 9th place
- 2019: 9th place
- 2020: Cancelled due to the COVID-19 pandemic
- 2021: 8th place
- 2021: 8th place
- 2022: 6th place
- 2023: 6th place
- 2024: 7th place
- 2025: 10th place
- 2026: 1st in Division I Group A
