= Stuart Percy =

Canadian ice hockey player (born 1993)

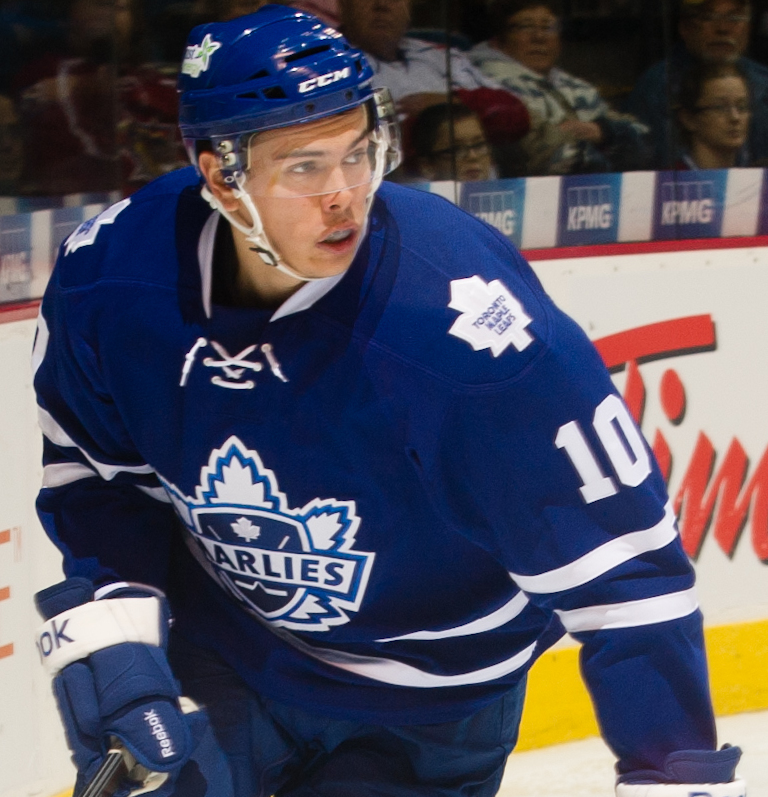
- Percy with the Toronto Marlies in 2013
- Born: May 18, 1993 (age 33) Oakville, Ontario, Canada
- Height: 6 ft 1 in (185 cm)
- Weight: 196 lb (89 kg; 14 st 0 lb)
- Position: Defence
- Shoots: Left
- ELH team Former teams: HC Škoda Plzeň; Toronto Maple Leafs; Vaasan Sport; Motor České Budějovice; HC Vítkovice
- NHL draft: 25th overall, 2011; Toronto Maple Leafs
- Playing career: 2008–present

Stuart Percy (born May 18, 1993) is a Canadian professional ice hockey defenceman who is currently playing for HC Škoda Plzeň in the Czech Extraliga (ELH). He was selected 25th overall in the 2011 NHL entry draft by the Toronto Maple Leafs.

== Playing career ==
On September 21, 2011, Percy was cut from the Toronto Maple Leafs training camp and sent back to major junior due to the impending lock-out. On November 22, 2011, the Maple Leafs signed Percy to a three-year, entry-level contract.

Following an impressive preseason, Percy started the 2014–15 season on the Leafs but was returned to the Toronto Marlies after playing seven games with the Maple Leafs.

After his entry-level contract, following the 2015–16 season, Percy was not tendered a contract as a restricted free agent, releasing him to free agency. On July 1, 2016, Percy was signed by the Pittsburgh Penguins to a one-year, two-way contract worth $575,000 at the NHL level. He was assigned to AHL affiliate, the Wilkes-Barre/Scranton Penguins for the duration of his contract.

As a free agent from the Penguins, Percy was not offered a contract offer over the summer for the 2017–18 season. On October 21, 2017, he agreed to a professional try-out contract with the Rochester Americans of the AHL, affiliate to the Buffalo Sabres. Percy impressed and soon secured a one-year contract to remain with the Americans. He responded with a professional-best season in contributing with personal highs of 7 goals and 27 assists for 34 points in 67 games.

On July 26, 2018, Percy agreed as a free agent to a one-year AHL contract with the Belleville Senators, affiliate to the Ottawa Senators. In the 2018–19 season, Percy registered 19 points in 41 games from the blueline for Belleville before he was traded to the Providence Bruins in exchange for Austin Fyten on March 4, 2019. Percy played out the remainder of the season with the P-Bruins, registering 5 points in 14 games.

As an unsigned free agent over the summer, Percy returned to the Belleville Senators on a professional try-out to begin the 2019–20 season on October 21, 2019. He appeared in just 5 games before his season was halted through an elbow injury.

As a free agent, Percy opted to pursue a European career, agreeing to a one-year contract with Finnish club, Vaasan Sport of the Liiga, on July 3, 2020.

After a lone season in Finland, Percy then moved to the Czech Extraliga and appeared in two seasons with Motor České Budějovice before leaving after the 2022–23 season. He was then signed to a two-year contract with fellow Czech club, HC Vítkovice Ridera, on May 2, 2023.

== International play ==
Medal record

Representing Canada

Men's ice hockey

Ivan Hlinka Memorial Tournament
Gold medal – first place	2010 Czech Republic	

World U-17 Hockey Challenge
Silver medal – second place	2010 Ontario	

As a junior, Percy featured in his first international tournament with Team Canada Ontario in the 2010 World U-17 Hockey Challenge, claiming a silver medal. He was then selected to the U18 Canadian team to appear and help retain the title in the 2010 Ivan Hlinka Tournament

== Personal ==
In his youth, Percy was a fan of the Toronto Maple Leafs, and had posters of former team players such as Mats Sundin, Tie Domi and Doug Gilmour lining his bedroom walls. Leading up to his draft year, Percy had hoped to be selected by the Maple Leafs.

Percy is a friend of fellow 2011 draft selections Matt Puempel and Ryan Strome, with whom he celebrated after being drafted.

Percy is a cousin of hockey players Carlo Colaiacovo and Paulo Colaiacovo. Carlo was also a first-round pick of the Maple Leafs, being selected 17th overall in 2001.

== Career statistics ==
=== Regular season and playoffs ===
			Regular season					Playoffs
Season	Team	League	GP	G	A	Pts	PIM	GP	G	A	Pts	PIM
2008–09	Toronto Marlboros AAA	GTHL U16	79	13	44	57	42	—	—	—	—	—
2009–10	Mississauga St. Michael's Majors	OHL	52	3	15	18	40	16	0	1	1	12
2010–11	Mississauga St. Michael's Majors	OHL	64	4	29	33	50	20	2	10	12	14
2011–12	Mississauga St. Michael's Majors	OHL	34	5	20	25	41	6	1	1	2	4
2011–12	Toronto Marlies	AHL	1	0	1	1	0	3	0	0	0	0
2012–13	Mississauga Steelheads	OHL	68	13	32	45	44	6	0	2	2	4
2012–13	Toronto Marlies	AHL	4	1	2	3	2	—	—	—	—	—
2013–14	Toronto Marlies	AHL	71	4	21	25	30	14	0	2	2	4
2014–15	Toronto Maple Leafs	NHL	9	0	3	3	2	—	—	—	—	—
2014–15	Toronto Marlies	AHL	43	1	10	11	14	4	0	2	2	2
2015–16	Toronto Marlies	AHL	58	4	20	24	47	14	0	4	4	12
2015–16	Toronto Maple Leafs	NHL	3	0	0	0	0	—	—	—	—	—
2016–17	Wilkes-Barre/Scranton Penguins	AHL	37	1	7	8	18	—	—	—	—	—
2017–18	Rochester Americans	AHL	67	7	27	34	34	2	1	1	2	0
2018–19	Belleville Senators	AHL	41	2	17	19	32	—	—	—	—	—
2018–19	Providence Bruins	AHL	14	1	4	5	8	1	0	0	0	0
2019–20	Belleville Senators	AHL	5	0	0	0	6	—	—	—	—	—
2020–21	Vaasan Sport	Liiga	50	3	14	17	24	2	0	0	0	0
2021–22	Motor České Budějovice	ELH	48	9	11	20	2	10	0	3	3	4
2022–23	Motor České Budějovice	ELH	26	7	15	22	14	—	—	—	—	—
2023–24	HC Vítkovice	ELH	49	5	18	23	36	3	1	0	1	0
2024–25	HC Vítkovice	ELH	35	5	10	15	6	—	—	—	—	—
2025–26	HC Škoda Plzeň	ELH	44	2	13	15	10	7	0	1	1	2
NHL totals			12	0	3	3	2	—	—	—	—	—
AHL totals			341	21	109	130	191	38	1	9	10	18
Liiga totals			50	3	14	17	24	2	0	0	0	0

=== International ===
Year	Team	Event	Result	GP	G	A	Pts	PIM
2010	Canada Ontario	U17	2nd place, silver medalist(s)	6	0	3	3	4
2010	Canada	IH18	1st place, gold medalist(s)	5	0	0	0	0
Junior totals				11	0	3	3	4

== Awards and honours ==
Award	Year	Ref
CHL Memorial Cup All-Star Team	2011	

Awards and achievements
Preceded by Tyler Biggs	Toronto Maple Leafs first-round draft pick 2011	Succeeded by Morgan Rielly
