= Ryan Nugent-Hopkins =

Canadian ice hockey player (born 1993)

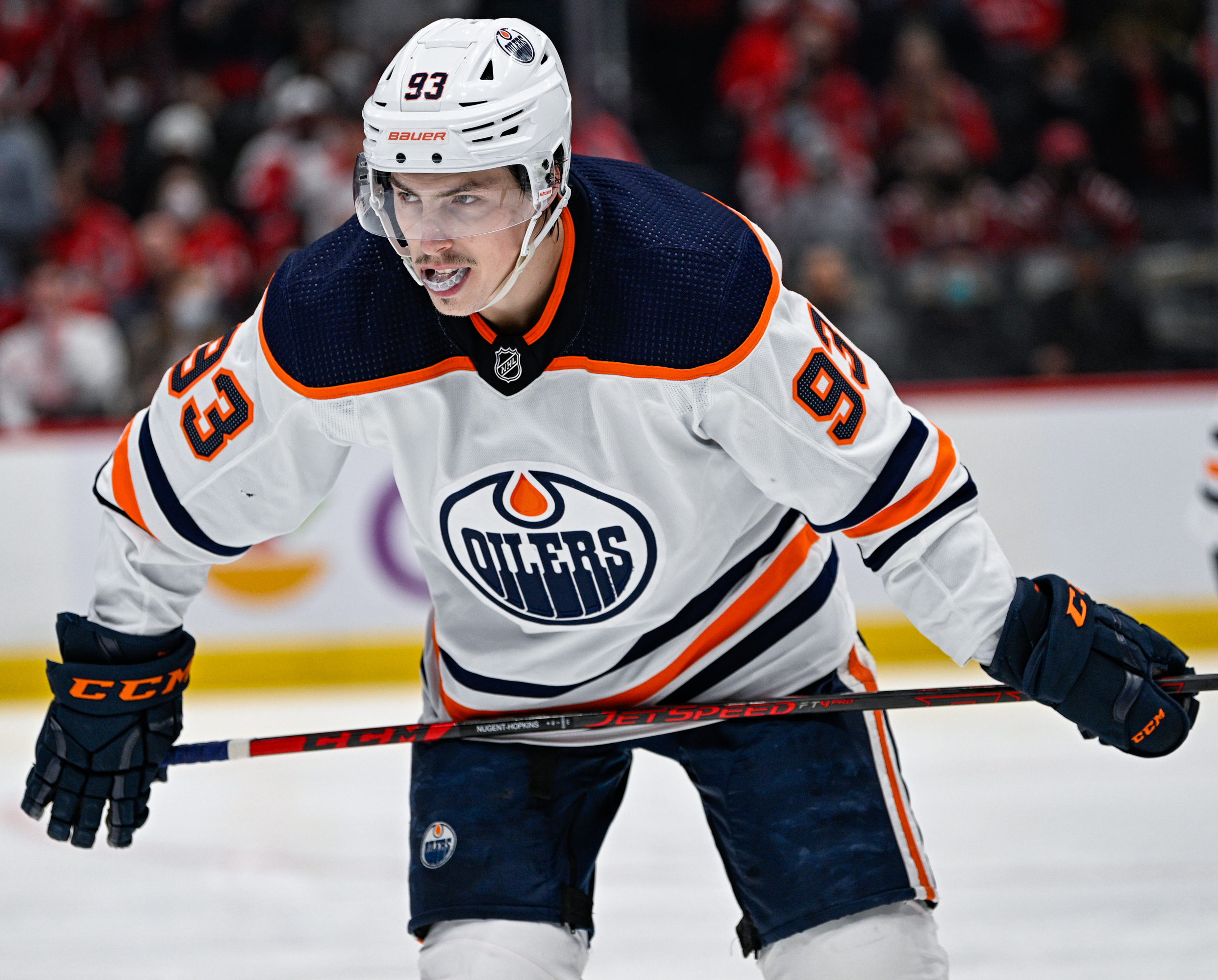
- Nugent-Hopkins with the Edmonton Oilers in February 2022
- Born: April 12, 1993 (age 33) Burnaby, British Columbia, Canada
- Height: 6 ft 0 in (183 cm)
- Weight: 190 lb (86 kg; 13 st 8 lb)
- Position: Forward
- Shoots: Left
- NHL team: Edmonton Oilers
- National team: Canada
- NHL draft: 1st overall, 2011; Edmonton Oilers
- Playing career: 2011–present

Ryan Nugent-Hopkins (born April 12, 1993) is a Canadian professional ice hockey player who is a forward and alternate captain for the Edmonton Oilers of the National Hockey League (NHL). Nicknamed "Nuge" by Oilers fans, Nugent-Hopkins was selected first overall by the Oilers in the 2011 NHL entry draft.

Growing up in British Columbia, Nugent-Hopkins played minor hockey with the Burnaby Winter Club and Vancouver North West Giants before joining the Red Deer Rebels in the Western Hockey League (WHL). Over his two seasons in the WHL, Nugent-Hopkins received numerous accolades and honours including the Jim Piggott Memorial Trophy, CHL Top Draft Prospect Award, and WHL East First All-Star Team selection. His efforts in the WHL began earning him attention from scouts; eventually, they unanimously projected him as the first overall pick in his draft class.

Nugent-Hopkins made his NHL debut at 18 in the 2011–12 season. He recorded 52 points in his rookie season to earn a nomination for the Calder Memorial Trophy and a place on the NHL All-Rookie Team. After six 50+ point seasons, he reached the 100-point plateau for the first time during the 2022–23 season. Nugent-Hopkins recorded a career-high 22 points in the 2024 Stanley Cup playoffs en route to the Oilers' first Stanley Cup Final appearance since 2006. He played his 1,000th NHL game in January 2026, becoming the first player to play 1,000 games exclusively as a member of the Oilers. In November 2026, he surpassed Kevin Lowe's record of 1,037 games for most games played in Oilers franchise history.

Internationally, Nugent-Hopkins has represented Canada at both the junior and senior levels. He won a gold medal with Canada at the 2010 Ivan Hlinka Memorial Tournament. While he made his senior team debut at the 2012 World Championship, Nugent-Hopkins continued to participate in junior tournaments until 2013. He represented Team North America at the 2016 World Cup of Hockey and Canada at the 2018 World Championship.

== Early life ==
Nugent-Hopkins was born on April 12, 1993, in Burnaby, British Columbia, to parents Roger Hopkins and Deb Nugent. He began skating at the age of two and trained alongside his older brother Adam. While he had numerous hockey idols growing up, he specifically admired Maurice Richard for his passion for hockey. Beyond hockey, Nugent-Hopkins was also involved in thoroughbred racing as his maternal grandfather raised and sold horses at Hastings Racecourse in Vancouver.

Growing up, Nugent-Hopkins was a fan of the Vancouver Canucks.

== Playing career ==
=== Amateur ===
As a youth, Nugent-Hopkins played minor ice hockey for the Burnaby Winter Club (BWC) in the Pacific Coast Bantam Hockey League from 2006 to 2008. He originally intended to play with the North Shore Winter Club, but the distance and cost made it unfeasible. As such, he played one season with the Burnaby Minor team, and competed with them in the 2005 Quebec International Pee-Wee Hockey Tournament. By the time he reached the eighth grade, Nugent-Hopkins chose to enrol at the Burnaby North hockey academy to get more ice time.

In his first year with the BWC, Nugent-Hopkins recorded 43 goals and 43 assists for 86 points as he helped the BWC win the 2007 Western Canadian Bantam championships. In his second year with the BWC, Nugent-Hopkins was named the 2007–08 BC Hockey Minor Hockey Player of the Year in recognition of his sportsmanship, leadership and hockey skill. He had recorded 119 goals and 95 assists for 214 points and helped the BWC win a silver medal in the 2008 Western Canada Bantam championships. He was also named the tournament MVP after recording 10 goals and four assists in five games. The night before the 2008 Western Hockey League (WHL) Bantam Draft, a member of the Red Deer Rebels called Nugent-Hopkins to ensure he was not planning on going the NCAA Division I route. After confirming he would commit to the WHL and not attend college, the Rebels drafted him first overall in the Bantam Draft.

After being drafted by the Rebels, Nugent-Hopkins played one year in the British Columbia Hockey Major Midget League with the Vancouver North West Giants during the 2008–09 season. As a 15-year-old, he led the league in scoring with 40 goals and 47 assists through 36 games en route to the 2009 BCMML championship. During the 2008 Mac's AAA midget hockey tournament, Nugent-Hopkins was named the Tournament MVP and earned a spot on the All-Star Team.

=== Junior ===
During the Giants' 2008–09 season, Nugent-Hopkins joined the Rebels for five games as an affiliate player. (Note: An affiliate player is "a player from a lower category/division team that has been called up by a higher category/division team so that the higher category/division may dress the maximum number of players allowable for a game in accordance with the Playing Rule") He made his WHL debut on November 7, 2008, against the Seattle Thunderbirds and scored his first WHL goal on January 23, 2009, against the Calgary Hitmen. While he was only permitted to play in five games, Nugent-Hopkins scored two goals and four assists. Upon joining the Rebels full-time, Nugent-Hopkins enrolled at Hunting Hills High School and remained there for the rest of his time in the WHL.

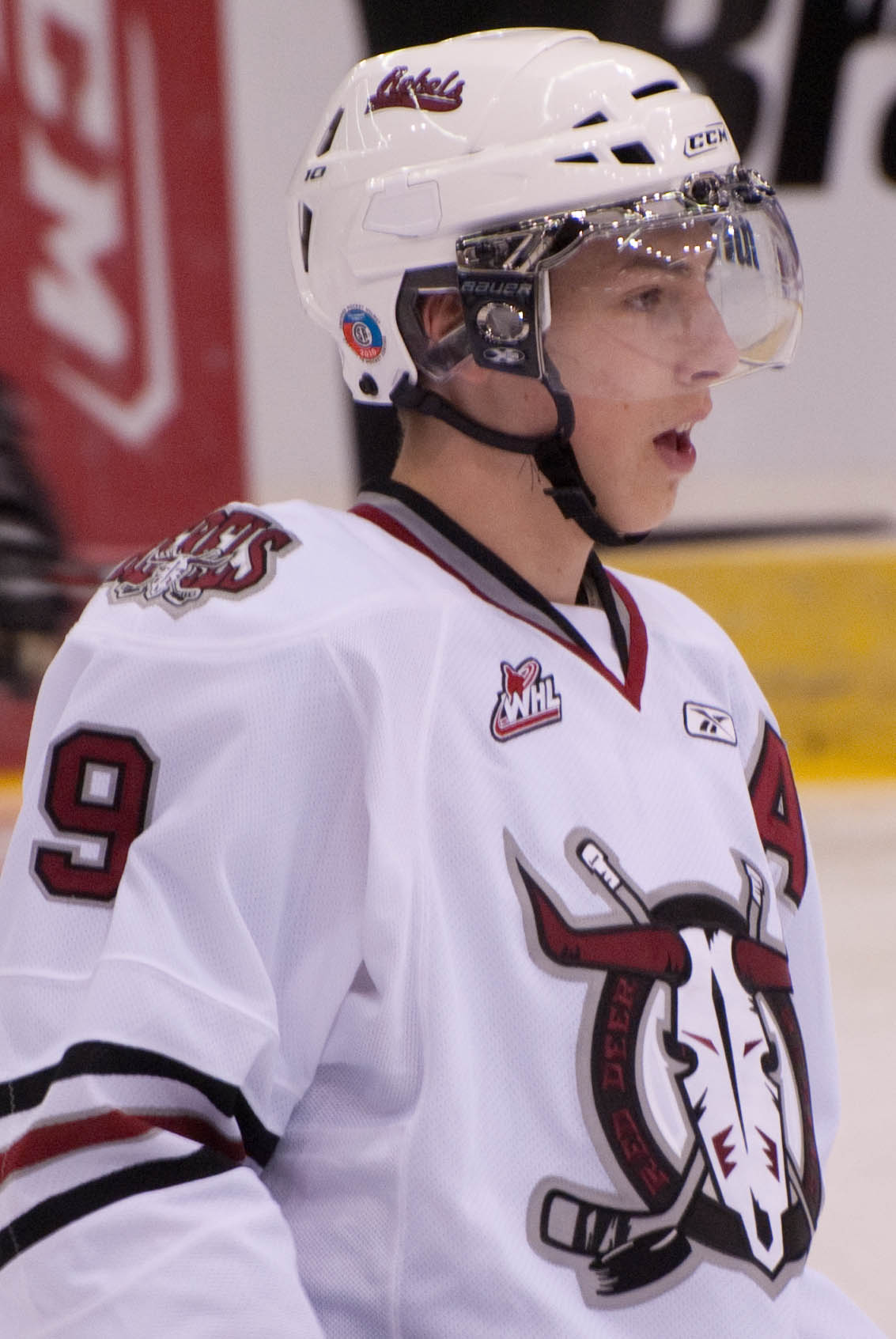
Nugent-Hopkins with the Red Deer Rebels in October 2010

Nugent-Hopkins began his rookie season with the Rebels during the 2009–10 season. Although he started the season with seven points over six games, the Rebels struggled to win games and held a 3–3–0 record. After recording his first WHL hat-trick on October 2, 2009, against the Brandon Wheat Kings, Nugent-Hopkins accumulated 10 points over six consecutive games. He finished the season with 24 goals and 41 assists through 67 games. Due to his play, Nugent-Hopkins was awarded the Jim Piggott Memorial Trophy as the WHL's Rookie of the Year. He was also a finalist for the CHL Rookie of the Year Award, but lost to Matt Puempel of the Peterborough Petes.

Leading up to the start of his draft-eligible season, Nugent-Hopkins worked with a personal trainer daily to build muscle and gain weight. Although he was ranked sixth overall in preseason he quickly climbed to second place by the International Scouting Service's (ISS) mid-November rankings. Nugent-Hopkins scored goals in three consecutive games to start the 2010–11 season and continued to collect points in the next eight. While he continued to collect assists, he struggled to score goals and went through an almost two-month goalless drought. Despite the lack of goals, Nugent-Hopkins ranked fourth in the league with 29 points by November 8. He was also selected by a committee of WHL General Managers and Hockey Canada's head scout to play for Team WHL in the 2010 Subway Super Series. Following his second overall ranking, Nugent-Hopkins was invited to Hockey Canada's selection camp for the 2010 World Junior Ice Hockey Championships but was cut before the final roster was announced. As one of the top-ranked draft-eligible players, Nugent-Hopkins was named captain of Team Orr and competed at the 2011 CHL/NHL Top Prospects Game. Between January 23 and February 12, 2011, he recorded seven goals and 20 assists over 10 games, including one six-point game. In recognition of his streak, Nugent-Hopkins was honoured as the CHL Player of Week for the week ending on February 6. Nugent-Hopkins continued to impress the league through the month of March as he recorded 11 goals and eight assists over eight games. During this streak, Nugent-Hopkins became the first Rebel since 2001 to score 100 points in a season. His efforts resulted in him being named the WHL Player of the Month of March.

Nugent-Hopkins finished the 2010–11 regular season leading the league with 75 assists and tied for third with 106 points. His new career-highs also helped the Rebels capture the WHL Central Division title and qualify for the 2011 WHL playoffs. He scored four points in game one of their first round series against the Edmonton Oil Kings and finished with nine points over four games. As the Rebels were eliminated the following round, he ended the playoffs with four goals and seven assist over nine games. His play throughout the regular season and playoffs resulted in him winning the CHL's Top Prospect of the Year award and a place on the WHL East First All-Star Team.

Leading up to the draft, the NHL Central Scouting Bureau, ISS, TSN, and The Hockey News all ranked him as the number one draft-eligible skater. E. J. McGuire, the Director of the NHL Central Scouting Bureau, said of Nugent-Hopkins, "He's got great skill and a knack for offence," while Cam Moon, the Rebels' play-by-play announcer, called him the best player the team had ever seen.

=== Edmonton Oilers (2011–present) ===
==== Early struggles and development (2011–2014) ====
On June 24, 2011, Nugent-Hopkins was selected first overall in the 2011 NHL entry draft by the Edmonton Oilers. He became the first WHL player drafted first overall in the NHL draft since 1996. Shortly following the draft, he signed a three-year entry-level contract with the Oilers on July 2, 2011. Before and after the draft, numerous scouts and hockey pundits raised concerns about Nugent-Hopkin's weight and ability to compete at the NHL level. Nugent-Hopkins began the Oilers' training camp at 177 pounds, 12 pounds heavier than his draft weight. He participated in the Oiler training camp and preseason games before making his NHL debut on October 9, 2011, against the Pittsburgh Penguins. While skating alongside Taylor Hall and Ales Hemsky in his debut, Nugent-Hopkins scored his first NHL goal to lead the Oilers to an eventual 2–1 win. At the time, he was the third youngest Oilers player to score their first NHL goal at the age of 18 years and 180 days. On October 15, in his third NHL game, Nugent-Hopkins scored his first NHL hat-trick in a loss to the Vancouver Canucks. This set a new franchise record for the earliest career hat-trick in the fewest career games. Through his first 11 NHL games, Nugent-Hopkins led all rookies in scoring with five goals and six assists. As such, he was recognized by the NHL as the Rookie of the Month for October. By the end of October, Nugent-Hopkins was centring the Oilers Kid Line between fellow young forwards Hall and Jordan Eberle. The trio earned that nickname due to their ages all being under 22. On November 19, 2011, Nugent-Hopkins recorded five assists against the Chicago Blackhawks in a 9–2 win. He subsequently became the first 18-year-old to record a five-assist game in NHL history and the fourth to record a five-point game (both assists and goals). By the end of the month, Nugent-Hopkins had recorded six goals and 10 assists to tie the franchise record for most points in a month by a rookie. He was also honoured as the NHL's Rookie of the Month, becoming the first rookie since Evgeni Malkin to be named the NHL's Rookie of the Month for October and November.

While continuing to play alongside Hall and Eberle, Nugent-Hopkins quickly climbed the NHL ranks and placed amongst the top 20 goal-scorers in the league by the end of December. As his rookie season progressed, Nugent-Hopkins began earning more on-ice responsibility, including a permanent position as the Oilers' first-line centre and the powerplay unit. However, his points total began to decline in January after he injured his shoulder during a game against the Blackhawks and required three to four weeks to recover. Nugent-Hopkins missed 13 games to recover before returning on February 4 for the Oilers games against the Detroit Red Wings. His return lasted only two games as he quickly reinjured his shoulder following a hit by Toronto Maple Leafs forward Mike Brown. Despite missing 20 games due to his shoulder injury, Nugent-Hopkins finished the regular season tied with Gabriel Landeskog in rookie scoring with 18 goals and 31 assists. On April 23, 2012, Nugent-Hopkins was nominated for the Calder Memorial Trophy as the NHL's Rookie of the Year along with Landeskog and Adam Henrique. Although he lost the Calder Trophy to Landeskog, Nugent-Hopkins was named to the NHL All-Rookie Team.

Due to the 2012–13 NHL lockout, Nugent-Hopkins joined the Oilers American Hockey League (AHL) affiliate, the Oklahoma City Barons, to start the season. He scored his first two goals in the AHL, and added an assist, on October 24, against the Lake Erie Monsters. The following game, he suffered a mouth injury after being hit with a stick and required extensive dental work to fix his teeth. While with the Barons, Nugent-Hopkins worked on winning face-offs and playing more physical game. When speaking on this, Nugent-Hopkins credited his off-season training program and his added 10 pounds. By late November, Nugent-Hopkins ranked second in league scoring with 21 points in 16 games. Although there was concern about his shoulder injury, Nugent-Hopkins was cleared to play for the Canadian national junior team in the 2013 World Junior Ice Hockey Championships. After returning from the World Junior Championships, Nugent-Hopkins rejoined the Oilers for the shortened 2012–13 season. He struggled in his return to the NHL and experienced a lengthy goalless drought through January and February. He finished the season with four goals and 20 assists through 40 games. On April 21, 2013, the Oilers announced that Nugent-Hopkins would miss the remainder of the season due to a shoulder injury.

On September 19, 2013, Nugent-Hopkins agreed to a seven-year extension with the Oilers worth $42 million with a $6 million per year cap hit. After undergoing shoulder surgery in the off-season, Nugent-Hopkins was expected to miss the first month of the 2013–14 season to finish recovering. Despite this, he was named one of the Oilers six assistant captains for the season. Nugent-Hopkins recovered quicker than expected and was cleared to play shortly after the season started. He made his season debut on October 7, 2013, against the New Jersey Devils, where he scored one goal and had six shots on net. He also played 28 minutes of ice time in his debut, the most among all skaters on either team. Nugent-Hopkins finished the season with a new career-high 19 goals and 37 assists for 57 points.

==== First All-Star appearance and continued injuries (2014–2019) ====
He understands his role. He knows he's our No. 1 centre. He understands that and I feel he's taking a step every day to really lead this team. We're going to need him every night. He understands his importance and I think he enjoys that weight on his shoulders

— Head coach Dallas Eakins on Nugent-Hopkins taking on more responsibility with the Oilers before the 2013–14 season.

During the 2014 off-season, Nugent-Hopkins continued to build muscle and returned to training camp at 192 pounds. He spoke hopefully about the impact the constructive off-season could have on his 2014–15 NHL season, as he specifically worked on his skating, face-offs, and defensive zone draws. The Oilers also selected German centreman Leon Draisaitl third overall in the 2014 NHL entry draft. He was expected to play as the second or third line centre for the Oilers, behind Nugent-Hopkins, if he made it on to the final roster. Once the season began, Nugent-Hopkins returned as the Oilers first-line centre and began taking more of a leadership role.

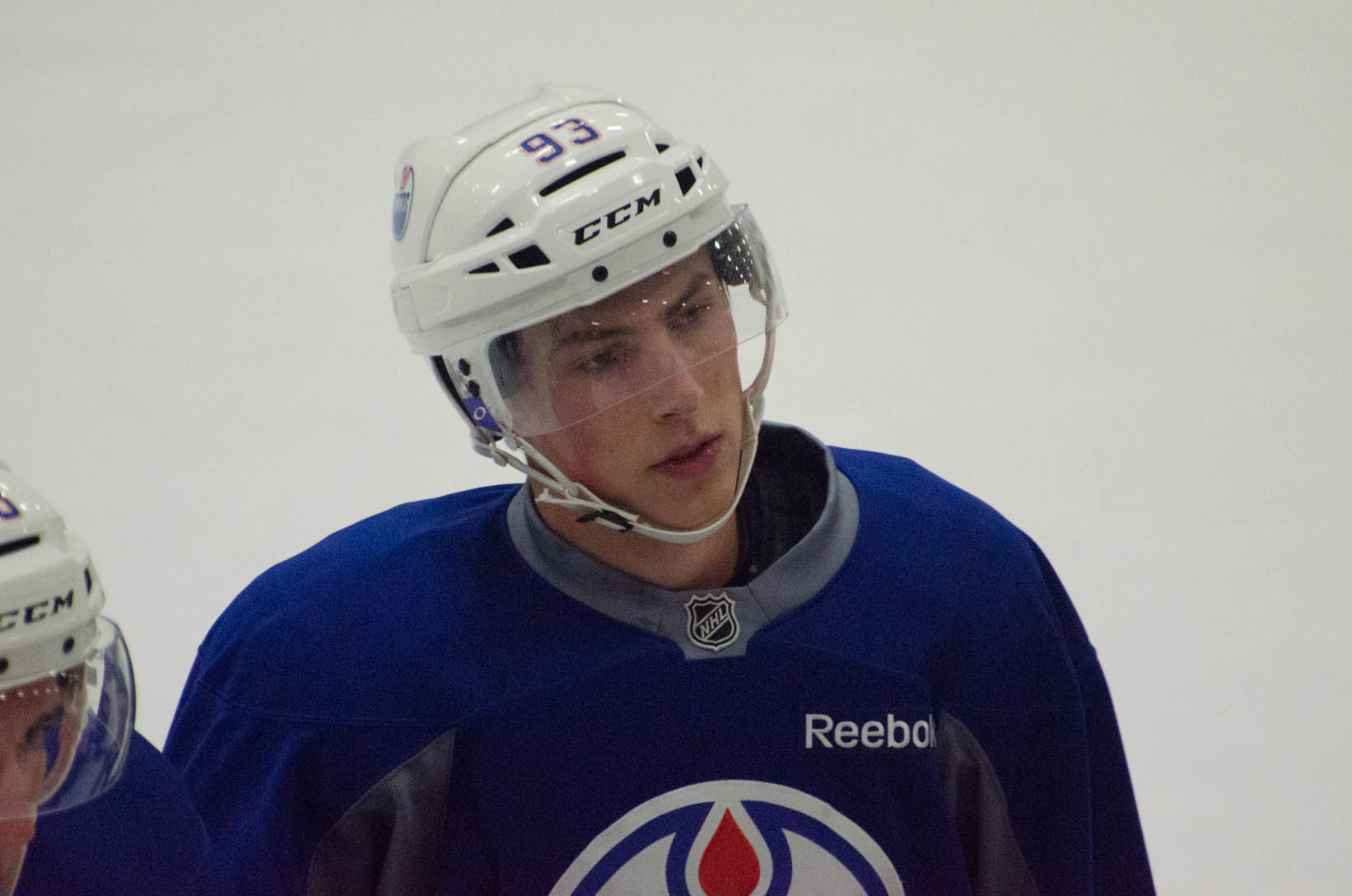
Nugent-Hopkins at the Oilers' training camp, September 2014

Nugent-Hopkins and the Oilers struggled to win games through the first half of the 2014–15 season. After maintaining a losing 7–19–5 record through 31 games, coach Eakins was fired and replaced by general manager Craig MacTavish. In spite of the teams struggles, Nugent-Hopkins had accumulated 25 points by early January and led all forwards in average ice time. As such, he was selected to represent the Oilers in the 2015 National Hockey League All-Star Game. Due to the All-Star draft selection process, both Nugent-Hopkins and Filip Forsberg received a new car after being the final two picks of either team. Upon returning from the All-Star Game, Nugent-Hopkins was split from Hall and began playing with Benoit Pouliot and Jordan Eberle as his wingers. On March 8, 2015, Nugent-Hopkins recorded his second career hat-trick in a 7–4 loss to the Carolina Hurricanes. Although he missed the final four games of the season with a broken foot, Nugent-Hopkins finished the season with 24 goals and 32 assists. When speaking about his improved scoring, Nugent-Hopkins said: "I think I was better at finding the balance between the offensive side and the defensive side (last season)...If you play more solid at both ends of the rink it creates more offence for everyone, and I started to find that last year." Following the regular season, he was asked to play for Team Canada at the Ice Hockey World Championships but passed on the opportunity to recover from his foot fracture.

Although he recovered from his foot fracture in time for the 2015–16 season, Nugent-Hopkins suffered two injuries throughout the season that limited him to just 55 games. He began the season on track to match his previous totals but began to see a dip in production after Eberle suffered an injury in October. He struggled to find consistent wingers and played alongside a variety of teammates, including Andrew Miller, Rob Klinkhammer, Draisaitl, and Hall. Once Eberle returned to the Oilers lineup in on November 5, Nugent-Hopkins was re-assigned as the Oilers second-line centre with Pouliot and Nail Yakupov. Even with his revolving linemates, Nugent-Hopkins recorded six goals and eight assists through 16 games. After missing one game due to an illness, Nugent-Hopkins struggled to return to his pre-illness form and began seeing less ice time. On January 18, 2016, the Oilers announced that Nugent-Hopkins had suffered a hand injury after blocking a shot in a game against the Los Angeles Kings and was expected to miss six to eight weeks. He was activated off of injured reserve on March 11, after nearly two months of recovery, but was shortly thereafter reinjured on March 23 against the Arizona Coyotes. His recovery from the second injury, a concussion, was quicker than his hand injury and he returned to the Oilers lineup 10 days later. Nugent-Hopkins finished the season with 34 points through 55 games. He was also tied to trade rumours with the New Jersey Devils but remained with the Oilers and lost teammate Hall.

Prior to the start of the 2016–17 season, Connor McDavid was named captain of the Oilers and Nugent-Hopkins was again named an alternate captain. In part due to his performance at the 2016 World Cup of Hockey, Nugent-Hopkins was expected to continue his high level of play at the NHL level. However, the continued dominance of McDavid and Draisaitl resulted in him being pushed down to the Oilers third line centre role. Oilers general manager Peter Chiarelli stated that he believed Nugent-Hopkins' lack of confidence was one of the key reasons for his offensive dip. Between January 26, 2017, and February 11, Nugent-Hopkins' line with Eberle and Lucic combined for only two points over 21 games. The trio were sometimes pointedly referred to as the "666 line" by Edmonton-based sportswriters due to their contracts each being $6 million. Although he played in all 82 games for the first time in his career, Nugent-Hopkins finished his sixth season with the Oilers with only 18 goals and 25 assists for 43 points. In spite of his lower production, the Oilers qualified for the Stanley Cup playoffs for the first time since 2006. Nugent-Hopkins played in his first NHL playoff game on April 12, 2017, in game one of the Western Conference first-round against the San Jose Sharks. He played alongside his regular linemates throughout the series, but all three struggled to score goals. He finished the postseason with four assists through 13 playoff games as the Oilers were eliminated in the second round. Both Todd McLellan and Peter Chiarelli praised Nugent-Hopkins for his development as a two-way forward but challenged him to continue working on his offensive abilities. When discussing changes needed for next season, McLellan specifically identified Nugent-Hopkins as a player who needed to take more risks.

Nugent-Hopkins started the 2017–18 season strong, tying McDavid for the team lead in goals with five through their first 11 games. Despite his success, the Oilers struggled to win games and held a losing 3–6–1 record. After Nugent-Hopkins scored his two goals in an 8–2 win over the Vegas Golden Knights on November 15, McLellan said he was proud of him and expected him to have a big year. The Oilers struggled with consistency through November and only recorded two consecutive wins once. Leading into the Christmas break, the team evened their record to 17–17–2 after winning three consecutive games. By the start of January, Nugent-Hopkins passed McDavid for the team lead in scoring with 15. On January 14, 2018, Nugent-Hopkins fractured his ribs following a hit by Brayden McNabb of the Vegas Golden Knights and was expected to miss five to six weeks. At the time of the injury, he ranked third on the team in scoring with 16 goals and 15 assists through 46 games. He returned to the Oilers lineup on March 3, almost a month and a half after the initial injury. Shortly after his return, Nugent-Hopkins was developed into a left winger to help with teammate Connor McDavid's line. Nugent-Hopkins was tested out as a winger because the Oilers could not find a consistent linemate for their top-line centre. He played the last 13 games of the regular season on the wing of McDavid, tallying 15 points. This helped bring his final points total to a career-high 24 goals and 24 assists over 62 games. Despite his line's success, the Oilers failed to qualify for the 2018 Stanley Cup playoffs by a wide margin. On April 23, 2018, Nugent-Hopkins was named the Oilers nominee for the King Clancy Memorial Trophy, as the player who best exemplifies leadership qualities and gives back to the community.

Nugent-Hopkins and McDavid remained linemates through the off-season as they both represented Team Canada at the 2018 IIHF World Championship. When they returned for the 2018–19 season, Nugent-Hopkins was back on the Oilers top line as McDavid's left winger. After failing to collect points through the Oilers' first two games of the season, Nugent-Hopkins quickly recorded three goals and eight assists over the next six games. However, the Oilers were unable to convert his increased production into wins and fell to a 9–10–1 record by mid-November. As such, head coach Todd McLellan was fired and replaced with veteran coach Ken Hitchcock. The coaching change did not slow down Nugent-Hopkins' production as he started December with six goals and 18 assists through 26 games. On March 26, 2019, Nugent-Hopkins and Draisaitl each recorded a hat-trick in an 8–4 win over the Los Angeles Kings. They became the first Oilers teammates to record dual hat-tricks in a game since Jari Kurri and Paul Coffey in 1985. Nugent-Hopkins ended the season with new career highs with 28 goals and 41 assists for 69 points. However, this came amid another poor season for the Oilers who failed to qualify for the playoffs for the 12th time in 13 years.

==== Breakout seasons, finding playoff success (2019–present) ====
Playing the majority of the 2019–20 season season as a winger, Nugent-Hopkins nearly equalled his career-highs in 65 games before the onset of the COVID-19 pandemic. He began the season with three points over five games as the Oilers maintained a five-game win streak. He added 11 more points over the next 20 games to help the Oilers rank first in the Pacific Division with a 16–7–3 record. On November 24, the Oilers announced that Nugent-Hopkins would miss at least two games due to a hand injury but did not disclose how the injury occurred. He ended up missing six games due to his injury and was activated off of injured reserve on December 8. His efforts before and after his hand injury were recognized by the league as he was named one of eight players in the Pacific Division fans could vote into the 2020 NHL All-Star Game. At the end of December, head coach Dave Tippett chose to split up McDavid and Draisaitl in order to increase the depth of scoring throughout the lineup. As such, Draisaitl joined Nugent-Hopkins and right winger Kailer Yamamoto on the Oilers second line. The trio played 20 consecutive games together between January 2 and February 23, resulting in a combined total of 19 goals. Over this period, Nugent-Hopkins recorded the most goals with eight and added 10 assists. Oilers media affectionately dubbed the trio the DYNamite line in recognition of their last names and ability to spark offence. Nugent-Hopkins recorded 42 of his total 61 points in the final 30 games before the regular season was paused due to the COVID-19 pandemic. Overall, Nugent-Hopkins finished with 22 goals and 39 assists for 61 points through 65 games.

In order to stay in shape over the break, Nugent-Hopkins trained with fellow BC local and Oilers teammate Jujhar Khaira in his hometown. When the NHL returned to play that July for the 2020 Stanley Cup playoffs, to be held in a bubble in Toronto and Edmonton, Nugent-Hopkins was one of 31 skaters that the Oilers took into their quarantine bubble. As the fifth-ranked team in the Western Conference at the time of the halt, the Oilers played in a qualifying round against the Chicago Blackhawks. In spite of their success in the regular season, coach Tippett chose to split up Nugent-Hopkins, Draisaitl, and Yamamoto until the final minutes of their losing effort in Game 4. He instead reunited Nugent-Hopkins on McDavid's wing while Draisaitl and Yamamoto remained on the second line. All members of Oilers top lines struggled offensively during the qualifiers and Nugent-Hopkins was limited to two goals and six assists over four games.

In light of pandemic restrictions on cross-border travel, the NHL temporarily realigned its structure for the 2020–21 season. All Canadian teams played in the North Division, and interdivisional play was suspended. The season was also shortened to just 56 games. Despite their success the previous season, Tippett opted to split up Nugent-Hopkins, Draisaitl, and Yamamoto and rarely reunited them. Before March, Nugent-Hopkins played mostly on McDavid's left wing and the DYNamite line only played 6:27 minutes together. However, their reunification in early March was short-lived and they were split up again a few games later. Tippett returned Nugent-Hopkins to his natural centre position on the Oilers' second line with Tyler Ennis and Jesse Puljujärvi as his new wingers. Before suffering an upper-body injury in early April, Nugent-Hopkins ranked fifth on the team in scoring with 12 goals and 16 assists. He missed 11 days to recover and scored in his return to the lineup on April 22, in a loss to the Montreal Canadiens. Nugent-Hopkins finished the shortened regular season with 16 goals and 19 assists through 52 games. He also matched numerous franchise records, including third in games played, fifth in goals, and sixth in assists. Nugent-Hopkins and the Oilers advanced to the 2021 Stanley Cup playoffs and faced the Winnipeg Jets in the North Division first round. They were unexpectedly swept by the Jets in the first round of the playoffs, with Nugent-Hopkins recording one goal and one assist in the four-game series. Following the end of the season, Nugent-Hopkins opted to forgo free agency and signed an eight-year, $41 million contract extension with the Oilers. The contract also came with a no-movement clause through to its expiration date.

During the 2021 off-season, the Oilers made numerous signings to improve their team including adding forward Zach Hyman and defenceman Cody Ceci. Due to the new acquisitions, Nugent-Hopkins started the 2021–22 season as the Oilers' second line centre between Hyman and Kyle Turris. Between Nugent-Hopkins, McDavid, and Draisaitl, the Oilers maintained their best start in franchise history by going 9–1–0 over their first 10 games. En route to this record, Nugent-Hopkins recorded his 300th career assist on October 23 in a 5–3 win over the Vegas Golden Knights. On December 4, Nugent-Hopkins recorded two assists to reach 500 NHL points in his 678th NHL game. When Nugent-Hopkin was placed on the NHL's COVID-19 protocol on December 17, he had registered three goals and 22 assists through 28 games. Before he could return to the Oilers lineup, he was then placed on injured reserve and was expected to miss 3 to 4 weeks. In the end, Nugent-Hopkins only missed six games before returning to the Oilers lineup on January 25, 2022. Upon returning to the Oilers lineup, he mostly played as their third-line centre with Derek Ryan and Warren Foegele. However, he struggled to return to form over the next 16 games and experienced a 10-game scoring slump before reinjuring his shoulder on February 26. Nugent-Hopkins was not the only Oilers member struggling. After falling out of a playoff spot, coach Dave Tippett was replaced midseason by Jay Woodcroft. As a centre between Foegele and Ryan, Nugent-Hopkins scored 11 goals and matched his career-high 39 assists.

As the Oilers finished the 2021–22 season second in the Pacific Division with 104 points, they met with the Los Angeles Kings in the first round of the 2022 Stanley Cup playoffs. In Game 3, Nugent-Hopkins scored two goals within 80 seconds of each other to win 5–2 over the Kings. These were the fastest two goals by an Oilers player in the postseason since Kurri scored two within 71 seconds of each other in 1989. After the Oilers were shutout in Game 4, Woodcroft moved Puljujarvi to Nugent-Hopkins' wing for Game 5. Although the Oilers were pushed to a game seven, they beat the Kings to advance to the Western Conference second round against the Calgary Flames. Nugent-Hopkins distinguished himself in game four of the series by scoring two goals, including the game-winner, to push the Flames to the brink of elimination. The Oilers successfully eliminated the Flames the following night to qualify for the Western Conference Final for the first time since 2006. However, they were swiftly eliminated by the Colorado Avalanche in four games. He finished the postseason with a career-high six goals and eight assists in 16 games.

Nugent-Hopkins set personal and franchise records throughout the 2022–23 season and helped the Oilers advance to the 2023 Stanley Cup playoffs. While he started the season on the Oilers' third-line with Warren Foegele and Ryan McLeod, he was promoted to their second line with Draisaitl and Hyman by mid-October. In their first full game together, Nugent-Hopkins recorded a goal and three assists. He later scored his 200th career NHL goal on October 26, 2022 against the St. Louis Blues. Through his first 28 games of the season, Nugent-Hopkins scored 14 goals and 19 assists. On February 23, 2023, Nugent-Hopkins became the ninth-highest point scorer in franchise history after recording his 600th career point in a 7–2 win over the Pittsburgh Penguins. He finished the month of March with his first five-point game since November 19, 2011. He scored a goal and four assists to lift the Oilers to a 7–4 win over the Vegas Golden Knights. Later, on April 5, 2023, he reached the 100-point milestone for the first time in his career. Joining teammates McDavid and Draisaitl, who had accomplished the same feat earlier, the Oilers became the first team since the 1995–96 Pittsburgh Penguins to have three players accumulate 100 points or more. Seven days later, he became the fifth player in franchise history to play 800 games solely for the Oilers. Nugent-Hopkins finished the regular season with a career-high 37 goals and 67 assists for 104 points.

Nugent-Hopkins and the Oilers faced the Los Angeles Kings in round one of the 2023 Stanley Cup playoffs. While he began the series on McDavid's left wing, he was quickly transitioned onto Draisaitl's line. He finished the series with four assists through seven games as the Oilers advanced to the Western Conference second round. After going 10 games without a goal, Nugent-Hopkins scored his first goal of the playoffs in game four of the second round against the Vegas Golden Knights. He finished the series with 11 points through 12 games as the Oilers were eliminated from playoff contention.

Nugent-Hopkins began the 2023–24 season playing on a line with Hyman and Foegele. However, his placement in the line-up was fluid and he often played along different players. He eventually found a long-term spot on the Oilers top line with McDavid and Hyman. During the Oilers record-setting 16-game win streak from December 19 to February 6, Nugent-Hopkins scored three goals. Shortly after their winning streak concluded, Nugent-Hopkins tied Mark Messier for third place on the Oilers' all-time games played list. After missing a late-February match due to an illness, Nugent-Hopkins temporarily lost his spot on the first line and was shifted to the second line with Draisaitl. He experienced a 13-game goalless drought through early and mid March, before breaking it with a goal and an assist on March 25 against the Winnipeg Jets. He finished the regular season with 18 goals and 49 assists, as the Oilers qualified for the 2024 Stanley Cup playoffs.

Nugent-Hopkins and the Oilers faced the Los Angeles Kings in round one of the 2024 Stanley Cup playoffs. While they started on separate lines, Evander Kane joined Nugent-Hopkins and Draisaitl on the Oilers second line starting in Game 3. In their first game together, Nugent-Hopkins recorded three assists while the trio combined for eight points. He recorded two assists in game five while Kane and Draisaitl each scored to help the Oilers eliminate the Kings from playoff contention. Nugent-Hopkins continued to produce offensively for the Oilers during their second round series against the Vancouver Canucks and set new career-highs in postseason points. He recorded two assists in game one to maintain his three game multi-point streak, although the Oilers lost 5–4. He was promoted to the Oilers top line with Hyman and McDavid for Game 5, although he failed to collect a point. The trio remained together for Game 6, where Nugent-Hopkins and McDavid both recorded three points to force Game 7. Nugent-Hopkins then recorded the game-winning goal in the second period of game seven and set a new career-high in playoff points. He scored his fifth and sixth goals of the playoffs in game five of the Western Conference Finals against the Dallas Stars. His two goals helped to give Edmonton a 3–1 win and a 3–2 series lead. While he went pointless in Game 6, the Oilers eliminated the Stars from playoff contention and advanced to the Stanley Cup Final for the first time since 2006. He scored his first career Stanley Cup Final goal in game four to give the Oilers their first win of the series and avoid elimination. Although he missed practice before game seven due to an illness, Nugent-Hopkins played in the 2–1 loss to the Panthers.

Nugent-Hopkins began the 2024–25 season with one assist in his first two games. His sole assist, which he scored on October 12, 2024, against the Chicago Blackhawks, was also his 700th NHL point. He struggled offensively through the first half of the season, and was limited to six goals and 12 assists through 33 games. However, after McDavid and Draisaitl suffered injuries, his offensive output greatly increased. He scored his fourth NHL hat-trick on March 22, 2025, against the Seattle Kraken, while also centering the Oilers top line between Vasily Podkolzin and Viktor Arvidsson. Through his first five games as a centreman, Nugent-Hopkins recorded nine points. The Oilers ended the 2024–25 season losing to the Florida Panthers in the Stanley Cup Final for a second consecutive year.

Nugent-Hopkins played his 1,000th NHL game on January 18, 2026, becoming the 417th overall player to reach the mark, as well as the first player to play 1,000 games exclusively as a member of the Edmonton Oilers. During that evening's game against the St. Louis Blues, he scored the opening goal of an eventual 6–0 win, becoming the 10th player in league history to score in their debut and 1,000th game.

On April 10, 2026, it was announced that Nugent-Hopkins was the Oilers nominee for the King Clancy Memorial Trophy for the second time in his career, awarded to the player who best exemplifies leadership qualities on and off the ice and has made a noteworthy humanitarian contribution in his community. The Oilers would end up losing to the Anaheim Ducks in the first round of the 2026 playoffs in six games.

On November 3, 2026, Nugent-Hopkins played his 1,038th career game, surpassing Kevin Lowe to become the franchise's all time games played leader. Nugent-Hopkins had a goal and an assist in the game, a 4–3 shootout loss to the New Jersey Devils.

== International play ==
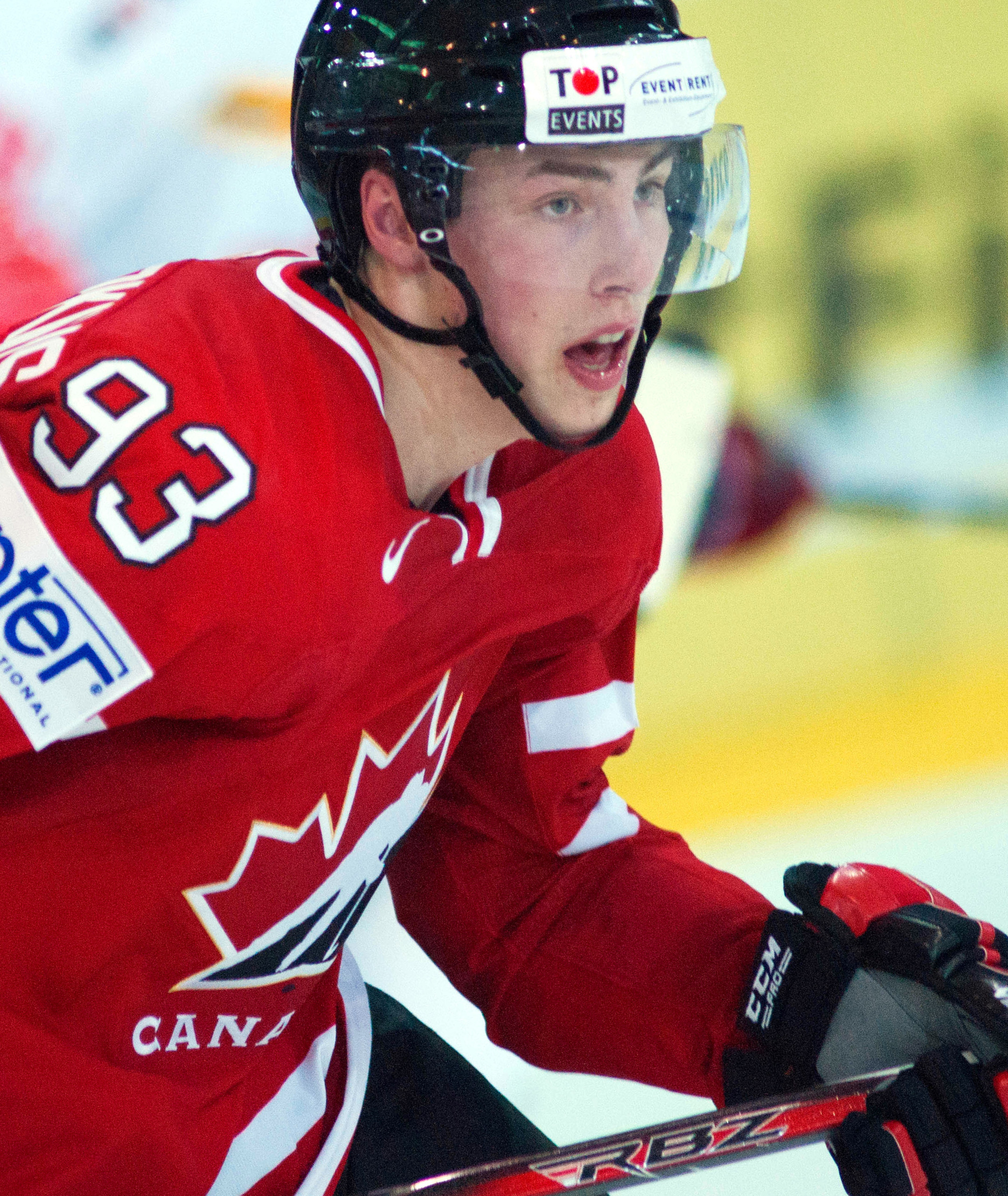
- Nugent-Hopkins playing for Canada in 2012

Medal record

Men's ice hockey

Representing Canada

Ivan Hlinka Memorial Tournament
Gold medal – first place	2010 Slovakia	

Nugent-Hopkins started his experience with Hockey Canada by representing Team Pacific at the 2010 World U-17 Hockey Challenge. He finished the tournament with one goal and four assists in five games as Team Pacific finished the tournament in fifth place. Later, he served as an alternate captain for Canada at the 2010 Ivan Hlinka Memorial Tournament. During the tournament, Nugent-Hopkins scored the game-winning goal in the gold medal game against the United States. The following year, Nugent-Hopkins was invited to Canada's selection camp to try out for their 2011 World Junior Championships team, but was amongst the final players cut.

Although he did not play in the 2011 World Junior Championships, Nugent-Hopkins was named to Canada senior team for the 2012 World Championship. He struggled in the first two games of the tournament before scoring three points in Canada's 7–2 win over France. He finished the tournament with four goals and two assists as Canada was eliminated in the quarterfinals.

Due to the 2012–13 NHL lockout, Nugent-Hopkins was named captain of Canada's junior team for the 2013 World Junior Championships. Although he led the tournament in scoring with 15 points in six games, the team was ultimately unable to medal. The loss ended Canada's 14-year medal streak in the annual world junior tournament. Due to his play, Nugent-Hopkins was named tournament's top forward and selected for the All-Star team.

Nugent-Hopkins did not play at an international tournament again until 2016 when he was a member of Team North America for the 2016 World Cup of Hockey. While playing on a line with Auston Matthews and Nathan MacKinnon, Nugent-Hopkins recorded three points over five games. He returned to Canada's senior team for the 2018 World Championship. He recorded a power-play goal in Canada's 5–4 win over Russia to advance them to the semifinal round. However, he was pointless in their loss to Switzerland in the semifinals.

== Personal life ==
Nugent-Hopkins married his fiancée, Breanne (née Windle) in 2019. The couple have two children together. Nugent-Hopkins' cousin, Carson Wetsch, is also an ice hockey forward. He was drafted by the San Jose Sharks in the 2024 NHL entry draft.

While Nugent-Hopkins had been nicknamed "Hoppy" while with the Red Deer Rebels, he more commonly became referred to as "Nuge" or "Nuggy" during his tenure with the Oilers. Due to his lengthy last name, sports broadcasters occasionally shorten his name to "RNH."

== Career statistics ==
			Regular season					Playoffs
Season	Team	League	GP	G	A	Pts	PIM	GP	G	A	Pts	PIM
2008–09	Red Deer Rebels	WHL	5	2	4	6	0	—	—	—	—	—
2009–10	Red Deer Rebels	WHL	67	24	41	65	28	4	0	2	2	0
2010–11	Red Deer Rebels	WHL	69	31	75	106	51	9	4	7	11	6
2011–12	Edmonton Oilers	NHL	62	18	34	52	16	—	—	—	—	—
2012–13	Oklahoma City Barons	AHL	19	8	12	20	6	—	—	—	—	—
2012–13	Edmonton Oilers	NHL	40	4	20	24	8	—	—	—	—	—
2013–14	Edmonton Oilers	NHL	80	19	37	56	26	—	—	—	—	—
2014–15	Edmonton Oilers	NHL	76	24	32	56	25	—	—	—	—	—
2015–16	Edmonton Oilers	NHL	55	12	22	34	18	—	—	—	—	—
2016–17	Edmonton Oilers	NHL	82	18	25	43	29	13	0	4	4	2
2017–18	Edmonton Oilers	NHL	62	24	24	48	20	—	—	—	—	—
2018–19	Edmonton Oilers	NHL	82	28	41	69	26	—	—	—	—	—
2019–20	Edmonton Oilers	NHL	65	22	39	61	33	4	2	6	8	0
2020–21	Edmonton Oilers	NHL	52	16	19	35	22	4	1	1	2	0
2021–22	Edmonton Oilers	NHL	63	11	39	50	16	16	6	8	14	14
2022–23	Edmonton Oilers	NHL	82	37	67	104	35	12	1	10	11	4
2023–24	Edmonton Oilers	NHL	80	18	49	67	36	25	7	15	22	8
2024–25	Edmonton Oilers	NHL	78	20	29	49	24	22	6	14	20	6
2025–26	Edmonton Oilers	NHL	72	20	36	56	21	6	2	3	5	2
NHL totals			1,031	291	513	804	355	102	25	61	86	36

=== International ===
Year	Team	Event	Result	GP	G	A	Pts	PIM
2010	Canada	IH18	1st place, gold medalist(s)	5	5	2	7	6
2012	Canada	WC	5th	8	4	2	6	4
2013	Canada	WJC	4th	6	4	11	15	4
2016	Team North America	WCH	5th	3	1	2	3	2
2018	Canada	WC	4th	10	5	3	8	2
Junior totals				11	9	13	22	10
Senior totals				21	10	7	17	8

== Awards, honours, and records ==
Award	Year	Ref
WHL
Jim Piggott Memorial Trophy	2010	
CHL Top Draft Prospect Award	2011	
WHL East First All-Star Team	2011	
NHL
NHL Rookie of the Month (October)	2012	
NHL Rookie of the Month (November)	2012	
NHL All-Rookie Team	2012	
NHL All-Star Game	2015	

=== Records ===
==== Oilers ====
- Most career regular season games played (1,038)
- Most assists in a game by a rookie (5)
- Most points in a game by a rookie (5, tied with Dave Lumley and Connor McDavid)
- First player to reach 1,000 career games entirely with the Oilers
- Most seasons played (15)

== Notes ==
Awards and achievements
Preceded by Brett Connolly	Winner of the Jim Piggott Memorial Trophy; 2009–10	Succeeded by Mathew Dumba
Preceded by Taylor Hall	NHL first overall draft pick 2011	Succeeded by Nail Yakupov
Preceded by Taylor Hall	Edmonton Oilers first-round draft pick 2011	Succeeded by Oscar Klefbom
