= Nail Yakupov =

Russian ice hockey player (born 1993)

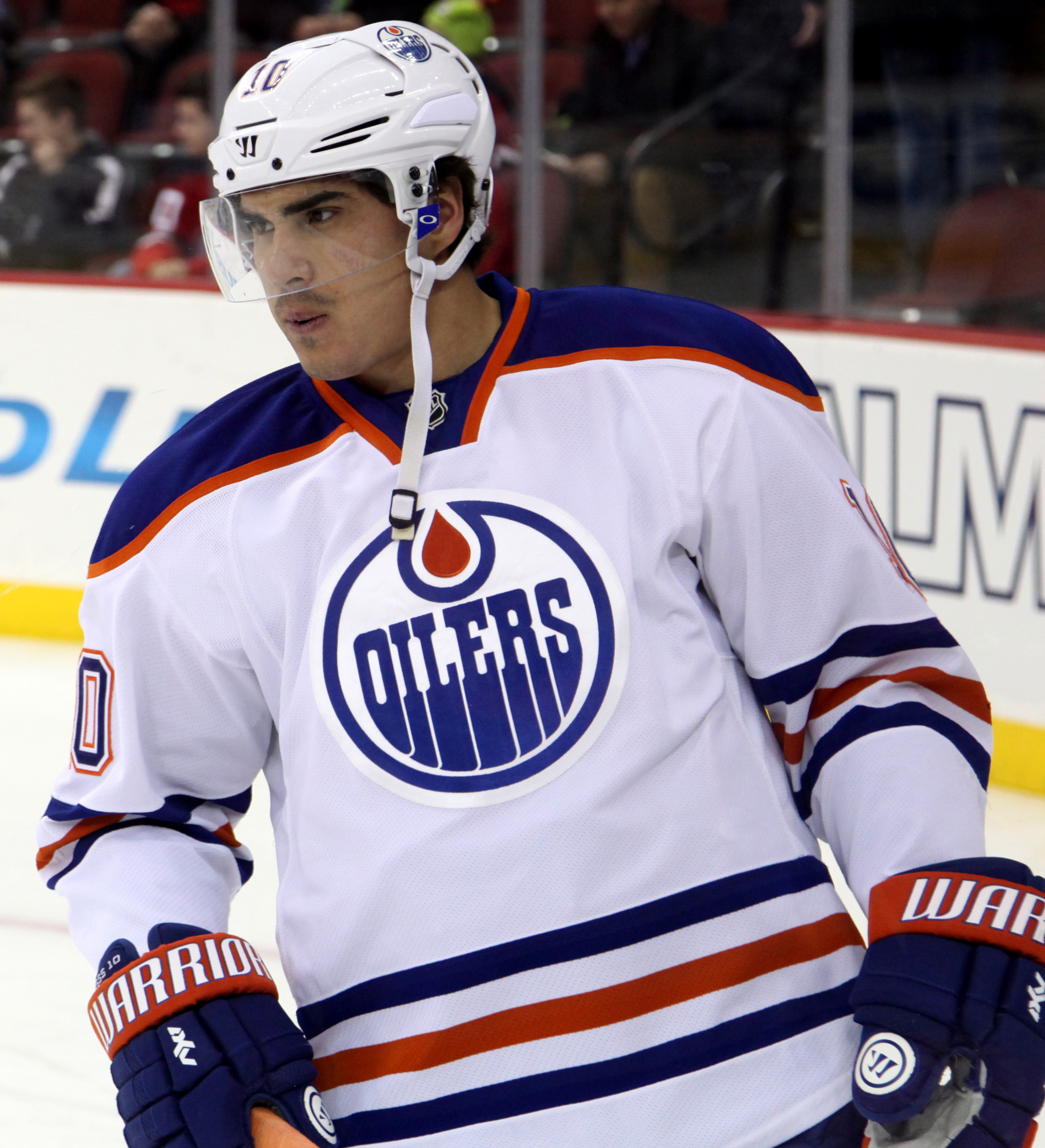
- Yakupov with the Edmonton Oilers in 2015
- Born: 6 October 1993 (age 33) Nizhnekamsk, Russia
- Height: 5 ft 11 in (180 cm)
- Weight: 195 lb (88 kg; 13 st 13 lb)
- Position: Winger
- Shoots: Left
- KHL team Former teams: Avangard Omsk; Neftekhimik Nizhnekamsk; Edmonton Oilers; St. Louis Blues; Colorado Avalanche; SKA Saint Petersburg; Amur Khabarovsk; Kunlun Red Star
- NHL draft: 1st overall, 2012; Edmonton Oilers
- Playing career: 2012–present

Nail Railovich Yakupov (Russian: Наиль Раилович Якупов, Tatar: Наил Раил улы Якупов; born 6 October 1993) is a Russian professional ice hockey player who is a winger for Avangard Omsk of the Kontinental Hockey League (KHL). He was selected first overall by the Edmonton Oilers at the 2012 NHL entry draft, and also played with the St. Louis Blues and Colorado Avalanche. Due to his relatively poor performance, short NHL career and low point totals, Yakupov is widely regarded as one of the biggest draft busts in NHL history.

Yakupov grew up within Neftekhimik Nizhnekamsk junior program and moved to North America in 2010 to further his career. Nicknamed the "Yak Attack" for his scoring abilities, he joined the Sarnia Sting, a major junior team in the Ontario Hockey League (OHL), where he played for two years before being selected in the NHL entry draft. Yakupov played for the Russian national junior team, winning medals in all three tournaments he participated in.

== Playing career ==
=== Junior ===
Yakupov was selected second overall by the Sarnia Sting in the 2010 Canadian Hockey League (CHL) Import Draft. Prior to this, he played in the Russian Minor Hockey League (MHL) for his hometown team, Reaktor Nizhnekamsk, but thought that trying to join the Ontario Hockey League (OHL) would be a quicker path to his dream to play in the National Hockey League (NHL).

Yakupov scored his first OHL goal against the Windsor Spitfires on 24 September 2010. After winning OHL Rookie of the Month for the month of October, Yakupov participated in the 11 November game of the Subway Super Series for Team Russia, at the John Labatt Centre in London, Ontario; Russia lost the game 4–0.

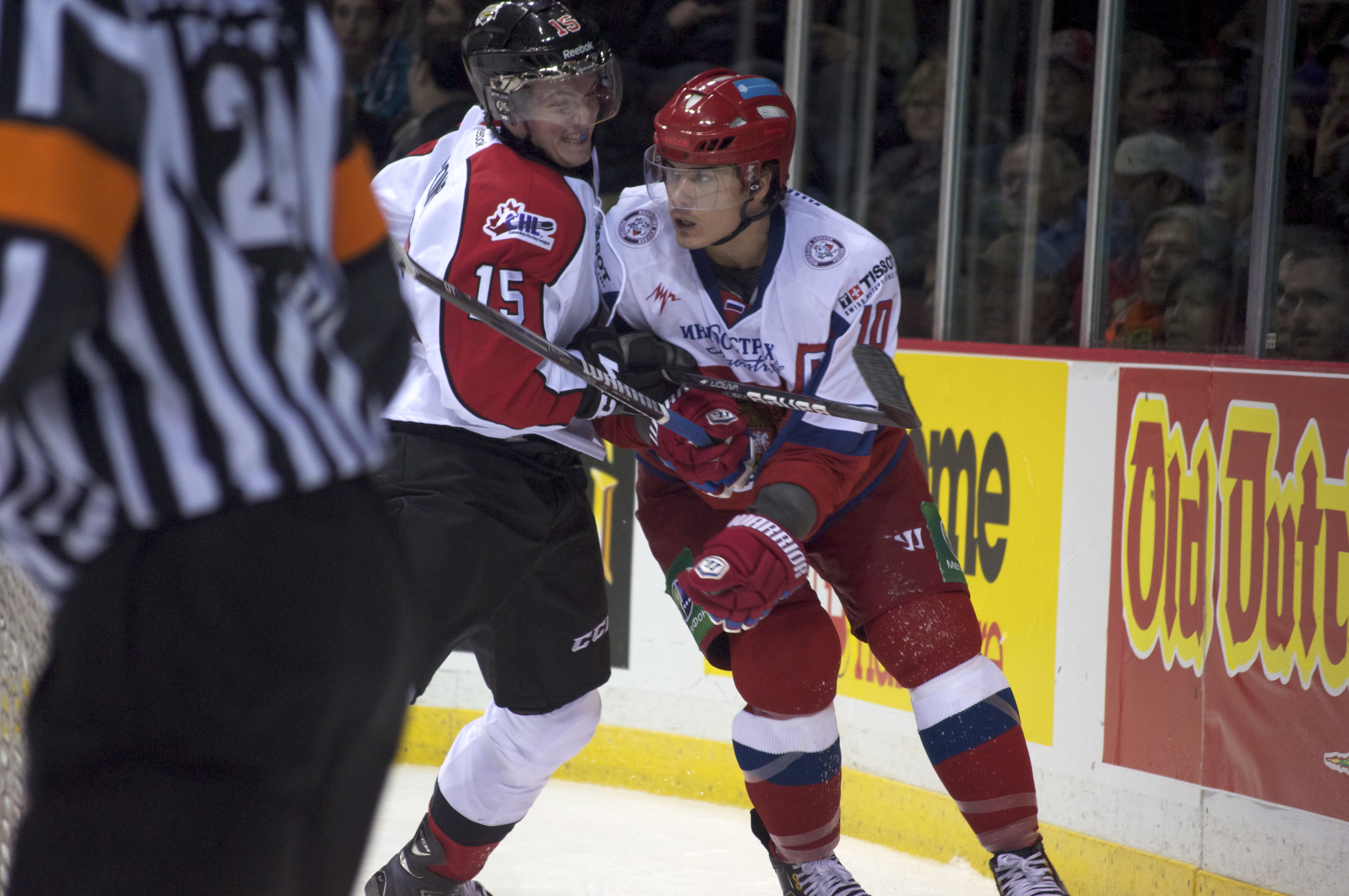
Yakupov being checked by Colton Sissons during the CHL Canada/Russia Series

On 3 February 2011, Yakupov was named the 'Kal Tire OHL Rookie of the Month' for January, which he had previously won in October 2010. He later won the title for the month of February as well. At the end of the season, Yakupov was named winner of the Emms Family Award as OHL Rookie of the Year, becoming the first Sting player to receive the honour. He was also named to the first All-Rookie team for the season. On 28 May, he was also awarded the title for CHL Rookie of the Year, as the top rookie in the Canadian junior circuit.

On 28 February, at 3:07 in the first period of a game against the Sault Ste. Marie Greyhounds, Yakupov scored his 43rd goal of the 2010–11 OHL season, giving him the new goal-scoring record for a rookie for the Sarnia Sting. On 19 March, in Sarnia's last game of the 2010–11 season, he scored an assist on the first goal as well as the third goal for Sarnia to obtain his 100th point of the season; he also scored another assist with 80 seconds left in the game to finish the season with 101 points.

Early in the 2011–12 season, Yakupov took the scoring lead with 25 points in 10 games. A 12-point week landed him CHL Player of the Week honours for the first time on 18 October 2011.

Leading up to the 2012 NHL entry draft, Yakupov was the highest-rated player available and was expected to be selected first overall. Toronto Maple Leafs general manager Brian Burke said later that Yakupov gave his team the single worst prospect interview he had ever conducted, referring to the player as "uncooperative and sulky". Burke elaborated, saying "Because we were picking fifth in 2012, and he was outraged we would have the temerity to interview him. Because he was going to go first overall." Burke added that during the draft interview, a fistfight almost developed between Yakupov and John Lilley, Toronto's chief amateur scout.

=== Professional ===
==== Edmonton Oilers ====
During the 2012 NHL entry draft on 23 June 2012, Yakupov was picked first overall by the Edmonton Oilers. On 23 July, the Oilers signed Yakupov to a three-year entry-level contract.

As a result of the 2012–13 NHL lockout, the Oilers had assigned Yakupov to Sarnia for the 2012–13 season. Reports indicated, however, that Yakupov would instead return to Russia and play for Neftekhimik Nizhnekamsk of the Kontinental Hockey League (KHL). Yakupov had played for the organization previously as a member of its junior teams. His first game with the team was on 22 September against Traktor Chelyabinsk. After two games with Neftekhimik, Yakupov was suspended temporarily by the KHL, as the International Ice Hockey Federation (IIHF) declared that he was not eligible to play in the league. According to IIHF rules, players moving between teams in different countries need to have a transfer card signed by the outgoing national ice hockey federation and the incoming federation. Hockey Canada, the governing body of ice hockey in Canada, had not signed Yakupov's card, making him ineligible to play in Russia. That required him to return to Canada and play with Sarnia for the remainder of the season. The reason they stated was that Yakupov had signed an entry-level contract with the Oilers, and according to an NHL–CHL agreement, players who sign such contracts have to either play in the NHL or for their CHL teams. Due to the NHL lockout, Yakupov could not play in the NHL and was therefore required to play in Sarnia. Within a few days, however, Hockey Canada decided that Yakupov was free to return to Russia, and signed his card; they "determined that Yakupov had no independent legal advice when, at the age of 17 years, he signed his contract with Sarnia."

The lockout ended in January 2013 and Yakupov returned to North America to play for the Oilers. A fan of Pavel Bure growing up, Yakupov wanted to have the number 10 on his jersey, the same one Bure wore for most of his career. However, since Shawn Horcoff wore that number at the time, Yakupov instead chose to wear number 64, as the two digits added up to 10. Yakupov played his first NHL game in the first Oilers game on 20 January 2013, against the Vancouver Canucks. He scored his first goal during the next game, the Oilers' home opener, against Antti Niemi of the San Jose Sharks on 22 January.

On 27 April, Yakupov recorded his first career hat-trick in a 7–2 victory over the Vancouver Canucks, with all three goals coming in the third period. Yakupov finished his rookie season leading all rookies in goals with 17, and tied with Jonathan Huberdeau for points with 31. Yakupov also scored 11 goals in the month of April, second only to countryman Alexander Ovechkin.

==== St. Louis Blues ====
On 7 October 2016, Yakupov's tenure with the Oilers ended in the lead up to the 2016–17 season, as he was traded to the St. Louis Blues in exchange for prospect Zach Pochiro and a conditional 2017 third-round pick. After attending training camp and pre-season, he made the Blues opening night roster, making his debut in a 5–2 victory over the Chicago Blackhawks on 12 October. In his next game the following day, he scored his first goal with the Blues and added an assist in a 3–2 victory over the Minnesota Wild. After initially providing an offensive spark with 4 points in his first 6 games, Yakupov's contributions dried up and he was made a healthy scratch by the Blues 12th game under head coach Ken Hitchcock. Appearing in a depth role with the Blues, Yakupov was exposed to limited ice time. After Hitchcock's departure, Yakupov appeared in just 11 further games out of 27 after he was made a frequent healthy scratch by Mike Yeo. His season was ended prematurely after suffering a knee injury, which required surgery, against the Colorado Avalanche on 31 March 2017. He completed his season with 3 goals and 6 assists for 9 points in 40 games, all career lows.

==== Colorado Avalanche ====
Yakupov was set to be a restricted free agent, but with a $2.5 million qualifying offer the Blues declined to renew, he became an unrestricted free agent. Despite gaining KHL interest, Yakupov was determined to continue in the NHL, and on 4 July 2017, he signed a one-year, $875,000 contract with the Colorado Avalanche.

==== Return to the KHL ====
As a free agent, Yakupov opted to leave the NHL and return to Russia to develop his game. He agreed to a two-year contract with perennial contending club, SKA Saint Petersburg of the KHL on 3 July 2018. In the 2018–19 season, Yakupov enjoyed initial success, registering 23 goals and 33 points through 47 regular season games. His production dipped in the playoffs, totalling 4 goals in 18 games.

On 19 June 2019, Yakupov was signed to an improved three-year contract extension with SKA Saint Petersburg. In the following 2019–20 season, Yakupov was unable to build upon his previous season and suffered a drop in production and role, registering 10 goals and 20 points in 46 games of the COVID-19 affected season.

With two years remaining on his contract, Yakupov was traded by SKA to Vityaz in exchange for Pavel Koltygin on 8 May 2020. While continuing in the off-season, Yakupov was then traded on by Vityaz just over a month from his initial acquisition, to Amur Khabarovsk in exchange for financial compensation on 14 June.

In the 2020–21 season with Yakupov looking to assume a larger role with Khabarovsk, he tallied just 1 goal and 7 points through 15 games with Amur before he was traded to ivision-leading Avangard Omsk in exchange for financial considerations on 20 October 2020. Yakupov made a positive impression with Avangard, collecting 6 goals and 10 points through 22 games before he was sidelined with COVID-19. He was unable to return for the remainder of the season after failing to gain medical clearance, however he remained with the team as they claimed the Gagarin Cup.

On 30 April 2021, Yakupov agreed to a two-year contract extension to remain with Avangard Omsk.

At the conclusion of his contract with Avangard, and coming of an injury riddled 2022–23 season, Yakupov left as a free agent and returned to his original club, Neftekhimik Nizhnekamsk, in signing a one-year contract on 11 July 2023. In the 2023–24 season, Yakupov continued to be affect by injuries, and was limited to 31 regular season games, posting an improved 8 goals and 19 points.

Yakupov continued his career in the KHL, leaving Nizhnemkamsk in the off-season and securing a one-year contract with Chinese-based club, Kunlun Red Star, on 13 August 2024. He was traded back to Avangard Omsk on 16 November, after 27 games with Kunlun Red Star.

== International play ==
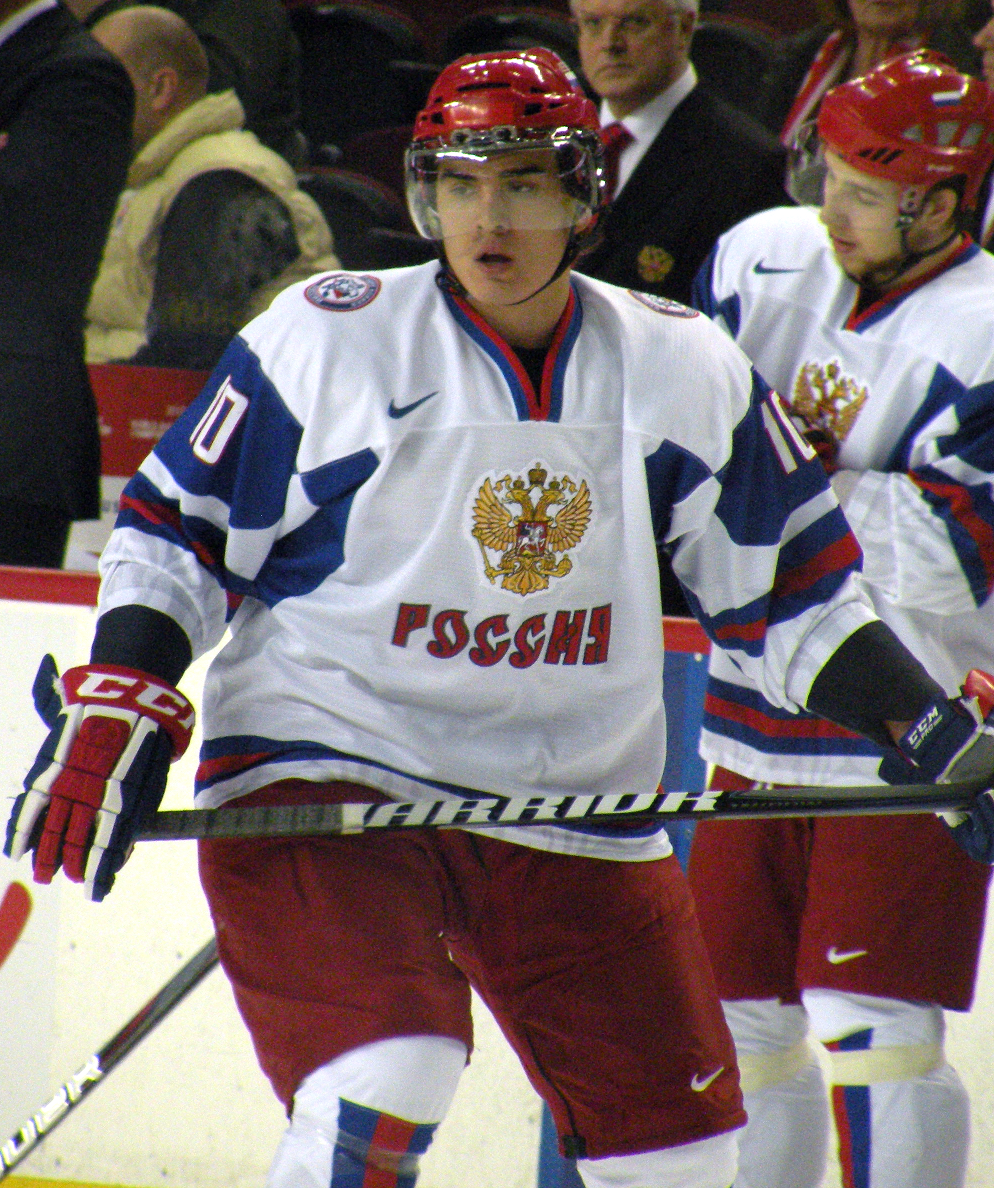

Medal record

Men's ice hockey

Representing Russia

World Junior Championships
Bronze medal – third place	2013 Russia	
Silver medal – second place	2012 Canada	

World Junior A Challenge
Bronze medal – third place	2009 Summerside	

World U18 Championships
Bronze medal – third place	2011 Germany	

Yakupov was part of Russia's team in the 2011 World U18 Championships. He scored a hat-trick in the bronze medal game, including an empty net goal with four seconds left, helping defeat Canada 6–4.

Yakupov was part of the 2012 World Junior Championships, joining Russia. His team defeated Canada in the semifinals, but lost 1–0 to Sweden in the gold medal game, acquiring a silver medal.

== Personal life ==
Yakupov is an ethnic Volga Tatar and a Muslim. He is the first Tatar and only Muslim ever to be selected first overall at the NHL entry draft. With his draft selection, Yakupov surpassed Nazem Kadri as the highest-drafted Muslim player in NHL history. His father, Rail, worked with Neftekhimik Nizhnekamsk ice hockey team as a coach and executive. Yakupov first skated when he was four years old, but was more interested in football and the English Premier League club Chelsea than in ice hockey.

== Career statistics ==
=== Regular season and playoffs ===
			Regular season					Playoffs
Season	Team	League	GP	G	A	Pts	PIM	GP	G	A	Pts	PIM
2009–10	Reaktor Nizhnekamsk	MHL	14	4	2	6	26	—	—	—	—	—
2010–11	Sarnia Sting	OHL	65	49	52	101	71	—	—	—	—	—
2011–12	Sarnia Sting	OHL	42	31	38	69	30	4	2	3	5	4
2012–13	Neftekhimik Nizhnekamsk	KHL	22	10	8	18	33	—	—	—	—	—
2012–13	Edmonton Oilers	NHL	48	17	14	31	30	—	—	—	—	—
2013–14	Edmonton Oilers	NHL	63	11	13	24	39	—	—	—	—	—
2014–15	Edmonton Oilers	NHL	81	14	19	33	23	—	—	—	—	—
2015–16	Edmonton Oilers	NHL	60	8	15	23	42	—	—	—	—	—
2016–17	St. Louis Blues	NHL	40	3	6	9	19	—	—	—	—	—
2017–18	Colorado Avalanche	NHL	58	9	7	16	37	—	—	—	—	—
2018–19	SKA Saint Petersburg	KHL	47	23	10	33	30	18	4	4	8	12
2019–20	SKA Saint Petersburg	KHL	46	10	10	20	16	—	—	—	—	—
2020–21	Amur Khabarovsk	KHL	15	1	5	6	10	—	—	—	—	—
2020–21	Avangard Omsk	KHL	22	6	4	10	6	—	—	—	—	—
2021–22	Avangard Omsk	KHL	43	9	17	26	14	10	1	3	4	2
2022–23	Avangard Omsk	KHL	16	6	4	10	4	14	1	2	3	8
2023–24	Neftekhimik Nizhnekamsk	KHL	31	8	11	19	18	—	—	—	—	—
2024–25	Kunlun Red Star	KHL	27	7	4	11	12	—	—	—	—	—
2024–25	Avangard Omsk	KHL	43	17	21	38	32	13	4	3	7	6
2025–26	Avangard Omsk	KHL	47	11	9	20	20	17	2	2	4	13
KHL totals			359	107	104	211	195	72	12	14	26	41
NHL totals			350	62	74	136	190	—	—	—	—	—

=== International ===
Year	Team	Event	Result	GP	G	A	Pts	PIM
2009	Russia	IH18	2nd place, silver medalist(s)	4	3	2	5	4
2010	Russia	IH18	5th	4	3	2	5	2
2011	Russia	U18	3rd place, bronze medalist(s)	7	6	7	13	6
2012	Russia	WJC	2nd place, silver medalist(s)	7	0	9	9	6
2013	Russia	WJC	3rd place, bronze medalist(s)	7	3	5	8	0
Junior totals				29	15	25	40	18

== Awards and honours ==
Award	Year
OHL
First All-Rookie Team	2011
Rookie of the Year	2011
CHL Rookie of the Year	2011
CHL Top Draft Prospect Award	2012
Third All-Star Team	2012
KHL
Gagarin Cup champion	2021

Awards and achievements
Preceded by Matt Puempel	Winner of the CHL Rookie of the Year Award; 2010–11	Succeeded by Mikhail Grigorenko
Preceded by Matt Puempel	Winner of the Emms Family Award; 2010–11	Succeeded by Aaron Ekblad
Preceded by Ryan Nugent-Hopkins	NHL first overall draft pick 2012	Succeeded by Nathan MacKinnon
Preceded by Ryan Nugent-Hopkins	Edmonton Oilers first-round draft pick 2012	Succeeded by Darnell Nurse
