= Emms Family Award =

- Sport: Ice hockey
- Awarded for: Top first-year player in OHL (Rookie of the Year)

History
- First award: 1973
- Most recent: Nikita Klepov

The Emms Family Award is presented annually to the Rookie of the Year (top first-year player) in the Ontario Hockey League. The winner is also nominated for the CHL Rookie of the Year. The award was donated by Hap Emms. Leighton "Hap" Emms was a coach, owner, general manager and pioneer of the game, with a 33-year presence in the Ontario Hockey Association. His involvement in the Barrie Flyers, Niagara Falls Flyers, and St. Catharines Black Hawks, led to eight Memorial Cup tournament appearances, winning four times.

== Winners ==
List of winners of the Emms Family Award.

- Blue background denotes also named CHL Rookie of the Year

Season	Winner	Team
1972–73	Dennis Maruk	London Knights
1973–74	Jack Valiquette	Sault Ste. Marie Greyhounds
1974–75	Danny Shearer	Hamilton Fincups
1975–76	John Tavella	Sault Ste. Marie Greyhounds
1976–77	Mike Gartner	Niagara Falls Flyers
1977–78	Wayne Gretzky	Sault Ste. Marie Greyhounds
1978–79	John Goodwin	Sault Ste. Marie Greyhounds
1979–80	Bruce Dowie	Toronto Marlboros
1980–81	Tony Tanti	Oshawa Generals
1981–82	Pat Verbeek	Sudbury Wolves
1982–83	Bruce Cassidy	Ottawa 67's
1983–84	Shawn Burr	Kitchener Rangers
1984–85	Derek King	Sault Ste. Marie Greyhounds
1985–86	Lonnie Loach	Guelph Platers
1986–87	Andrew Cassels	Ottawa 67's
1987–88	Rick Corriveau	London Knights
1988–89	Owen Nolan	Cornwall Royals
1989–90	Chris Longo	Peterborough Petes
1990–91	Cory Stillman	Windsor Spitfires
1991–92	Chris Gratton	Kingston Frontenacs
1992–93	Jeff O'Neill	Guelph Storm
1993–94	Vitali Yachmenev	North Bay Centennials
1994–95	Bryan Berard	Detroit Junior Red Wings
1995–96	Joe Thornton	Sault Ste. Marie Greyhounds
1996–97	Peter Sarno	Windsor Spitfires
1997–98	David Legwand	Plymouth Whalers
1998–99	Sheldon Keefe	Barrie Colts
1999–00	Derek Roy	Kitchener Rangers
2000–01	Rick Nash	London Knights
2001–02	Patrick O'Sullivan	Mississauga IceDogs
2002–03	Rob Schremp	Mississauga IceDogs
2003–04	Bryan Little	Barrie Colts
2004–05	Benoit Pouliot	Sudbury Wolves
2005–06	John Tavares	Oshawa Generals
2006–07	Patrick Kane	London Knights
2007–08	Taylor Hall	Windsor Spitfires
2008–09	Evgeny Grachev	Brampton Battalion
2009–10	Matt Puempel	Peterborough Petes
2010–11	Nail Yakupov	Sarnia Sting
2011–12	Aaron Ekblad	Barrie Colts
2012–13	Connor McDavid	Erie Otters
2013–14	Travis Konecny	Ottawa 67's
2014–15	Alex DeBrincat	Erie Otters
2015–16	Alexander Nylander	Mississauga Steelheads
2016–17	Ryan Merkley	Guelph Storm
2017–18	Andrei Svechnikov	Barrie Colts
2018–19	Quinton Byfield	Sudbury Wolves
2019–20	Shane Wright	Kingston Frontenacs
2020–21	Not awarded, season cancelled due to COVID-19 pandemic	
2021–22	Cam Allen	Guelph Storm
2022–23	Michael Misa	Saginaw Spirit
2023–24	Jake O'Brien	Brantford Bulldogs
2024–25	Pierce Mbuyi	Owen Sound Attack
2025–26	Nikita Klepov	Saginaw Spirit

== See also ==
- RDS Cup – Quebec Major Junior Hockey League Rookie of the Year
- Jim Piggott Memorial Trophy – Western Hockey League Rookie of the Year
- List of Canadian Hockey League awards
