= Parri Ceci =

Canadian football player (born 1961)

Profile
- Position: Wide receiver

Personal information
- Born: September 3, 1961 (age 65); Ottawa, Ontario, Canada

Career information
- University: Guelph

Career history
- 1985–1986: Calgary Stampeders

Parri Ceci (born September 3, 1961) is a Canadian former professional football player who was a receiver with the Calgary Stampeders of the Canadian Football League's (CFL) in the mid-1980s.

Ceci held the Vanier Cup record for the longest touchdown catch, with an 89-yard reception in 1984, while playing with the Guelph Gryphons.

Ceci now works for the federal government as a database administrator. His son, Cody Ceci, is a professional hockey player who was drafted by the Ottawa Senators in 2012 and currently plays for the Dallas Stars.
