= Evgeny Grachyov =

Russian ice hockey player

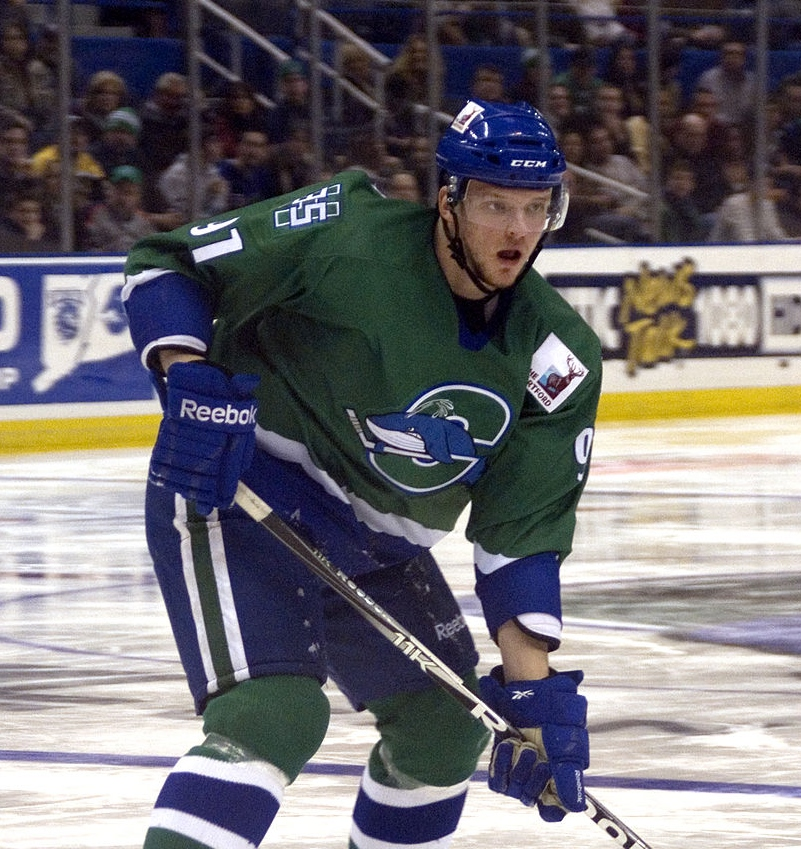
- Grachyov with the Connecticut Whale in 2011
- Born: February 21, 1990 (age 36) Khabarovsk, Russian SFSR, Soviet Union
- Height: 6 ft 4 in (193 cm)
- Weight: 225 lb (102 kg; 16 st 1 lb)
- Position: Centre
- Shot: Left
- Played for: New York Rangers; St. Louis Blues; Admiral Vladivostok; Lokomotiv Yaroslavl; Amur Khabarovsk; Torpedo Nizhny Novgorod; Avtomobilist Yekaterinburg; Avangard Omsk; Dinamo Riga
- NHL draft: 75th overall, 2008; New York Rangers
- Playing career: 2008–2026

Yevgeni Igorevich Grachyov (Russian: Евге́ний И́горевич Грачё́в; born February 21, 1990), also known as Evgeny Grachev, is a Russian former professional ice hockey centreman who played in the Kontinental Hockey League (KHL). He was drafted into the National Hockey League (NHL) by the New York Rangers in 2008, playing 34 games in the NHL for both the Rangers and St. Louis Blues between 2010 and 2012 prior to joining the KHL.

== Playing career ==
Grachyov played one game with Lokomotiv Yaroslavl of the Russian Superleague (RSL) in the 2007–08 season. He was then selected 75th overall by the New York Rangers in the 2008 NHL entry draft on June 21, 2008. He was also drafted 40th overall in the Canadian Hockey League (CHL) Import Draft by the Brampton Battalion of the Ontario Hockey League (OHL). After scoring 40 goals and 40 assists for 80 points in 60 games and posting a +48 plus-minus rating, Grachyov was announced as the winner of the Emms Family Award as OHL Rookie of the Year on April 8, 2009.

In the 2009–10 season, Grachyov played with the Hartford Wolf Pack of the American Hockey League (AHL), the Rangers' top-level minor league affiliate, where he scored 12 goals and 16 assists in his first season as a professional in North America. He was called up to the Rangers on October 8, 2009, but was later reassigned to Hartford the following day without playing having played a game for New York.

Grachyov was again called up to the Rangers on October 28, 2010, and made his NHL debut against the Carolina Hurricanes on October 29, 2010. He was returned to Hartford on November 8 after playing six games for the Rangers. On January 23, 2011, he was again promoted to New York, but again sent down for two games with the Connecticut Whale – the Rangers' new AHL affiliate – during the NHL All-Star break. He was recalled to the Rangers on January 30, 2011, but returned to the Whale on February 1 without playing another game with the Rangers. In 73 games with the Whale in 2010–11, Grachyov scored 16 goals and had 22 assists for 38 total points. He also tied with Pavel Valentenko for the team lead with a plus/minus rating of +21.

On June 25, 2011, Grachyov was traded to the St. Louis Blues in exchange for a third-round draft pick in 2011. His first NHL point came on an assist in a game against the Philadelphia Flyers on October 22, 2011. Grachyov scored his first career NHL goal on December 26 against the Dallas Stars' Andrew Raycroft. Grachyov played another season in the US, for the now defunct Peoria Rivermen, before returning to play in his native Russia. Grachyov initially played for Admiral Vladivostok before leaving them to play for several other teams, returning to Admiral Vladivostok in the 2021–22 season.

After two further seasons with Vladivostok, Grachyov left to return to another former club, Amur Khabarovsk, as a free agent after signing a one-year contract on 24 May 2023.

Following his 18th professional season, Grachyov announced his retirement following his second stint with Khabarovsk and remained with the club by accepting an assistant coaching role for the 2026–27 season on 15 July 2026.

== Career statistics ==
=== Regular season and playoffs ===
			Regular season					Playoffs
Season	Team	League	GP	G	A	Pts	PIM	GP	G	A	Pts	PIM
2005–06	Lokomotiv-2 Yaroslavl	RUS-3	1	0	0	0	2	—	—	—	—	—
2006–07	Lokomotiv-2 Yaroslavl	RUS-3	30	7	6	13	8	—	—	—	—	—
2007–08	Lokomotiv-2 Yaroslavl	RUS-3	34	17	20	37	18	—	—	—	—	—
2007–08	Lokomotiv Yaroslavl	RSL	1	0	0	0	0	—	—	—	—	—
2008–09	Brampton Battalion	OHL	60	40	40	80	22	19	11	14	25	4
2009–10	Hartford Wolf Pack	AHL	80	12	16	28	14	—	—	—	—	—
2010–11	Hartford Wolf Pack/Connecticut Whale	AHL	73	16	22	38	21	6	0	2	2	4
2010–11	New York Rangers	NHL	8	0	0	0	0	—	—	—	—	—
2011–12	St. Louis Blues	NHL	26	1	3	4	2	—	—	—	—	—
2011–12	Peoria Rivermen	AHL	39	3	7	10	18	—	—	—	—	—
2012–13	Peoria Rivermen	AHL	76	11	15	26	40	—	—	—	—	—
2013–14	Admiral Vladivostok	KHL	50	6	11	17	37	3	1	1	2	0
2014–15	Lokomotiv Yaroslavl	KHL	41	2	2	4	11	3	0	1	1	0
2015–16	Amur Khabarovsk	KHL	59	5	7	12	12	—	—	—	—	—
2016–17	Torpedo Nizhny Novgorod	KHL	56	5	13	18	25	3	0	1	1	0
2017–18	Torpedo Nizhny Novgorod	KHL	53	3	3	6	18	4	0	0	0	0
2018–19	Avtomobilist Yekaterinburg	KHL	44	5	6	11	18	4	0	0	0	2
2019–20	Avangard Omsk	KHL	49	5	7	12	16	4	0	0	0	0
2020–21	Dinamo Riga	KHL	51	4	5	9	22	—	—	—	—	—
2021–22	Admiral Vladivostok	KHL	28	4	5	9	10	—	—	—	—	—
2022–23	Admiral Vladivostok	KHL	64	3	7	10	38	12	0	2	2	20
2023–24	Amur Khabarovsk	KHL	57	10	10	20	24	—	—	—	—	—
2024–25	Amur Khabarovsk	KHL	66	7	10	17	27	—	—	—	—	—
2025–26	Amur Khabarovsk	KHL	60	1	6	7	25	—	—	—	—	—
NHL totals			34	1	3	4	2	—	—	—	—	—
KHL totals			678	60	92	152	283	33	1	5	6	22

=== International ===
Medal record

Representing Russia

Ice hockey

World Junior Championships
Bronze medal – third place	2009 Canada	

IIHF U18 Championships
Silver medal – second place	2008 Russia	

Year	Team	Event	GP	G	A	Pts	PIM
2007	Russia	IH18	4	2	2	4	14
2008	Russia	U18	6	2	3	5	2
2009	Russia	WJC	7	2	3	5	4
Junior totals			13	4	6	10	6

== Awards and achievements ==
- 2008–09 OHL Emms Family Award

Awards and achievements
Preceded by Taylor Hall	Winner of the Emms Family Award; 2008–09	Succeeded by Matt Puempel
