= Cody Ceci =

Canadian ice hockey player (born 1993)

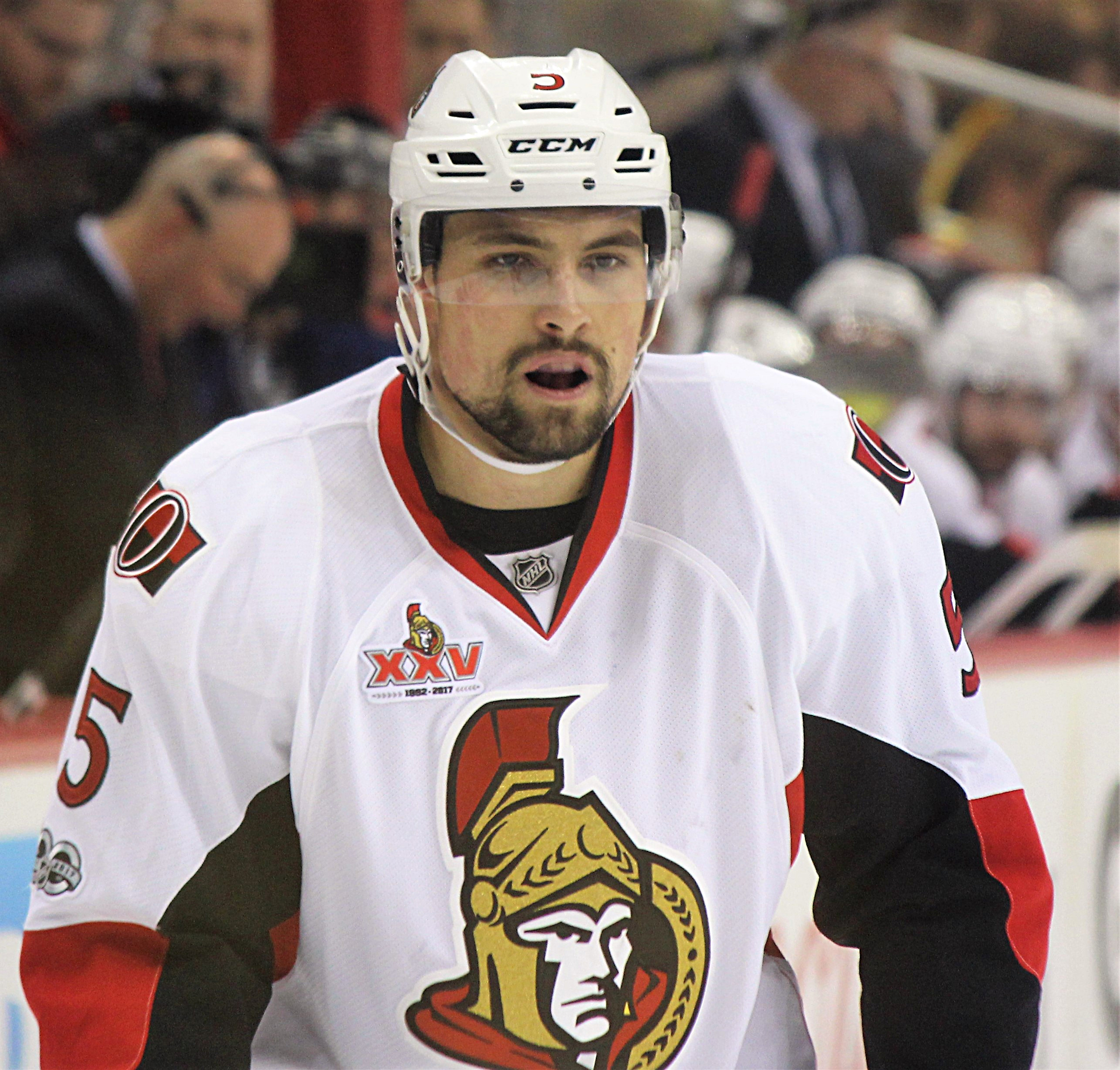
- Ceci with the Ottawa Senators in May 2017
- Born: December 21, 1993 (age 32) Ottawa, Ontario, Canada
- Height: 6 ft 3 in (191 cm)
- Weight: 210 lb (95 kg; 15 st 0 lb)
- Position: Defence
- Shoots: Right
- NHL team Former teams: Los Angeles Kings; Ottawa Senators; Toronto Maple Leafs; Pittsburgh Penguins; Edmonton Oilers; San Jose Sharks; Dallas Stars
- National team: Canada
- NHL draft: 15th overall, 2012; Ottawa Senators
- Playing career: 2013–present

Cody Ceci (born December 21, 1993) is a Canadian professional ice hockey player who is a defenceman for the Los Angeles Kings of the National Hockey League (NHL). He previously played for the Ottawa Senators, Toronto Maple Leafs, Pittsburgh Penguins, Edmonton Oilers, San Jose Sharks and Dallas Stars.

After playing junior-age ice hockey with the Ottawa 67's, Ceci was selected 15th overall in the 2012 NHL entry draft by the Ottawa Senators. He made his NHL debut in the 2013–14 season after playing for the Senators' American Hockey League (AHL) affiliate Binghamton Senators.

== Early life ==
Born and raised in Ottawa, Ceci is the son of former Canadian Football League receiver and 1984 Vanier Cup MVP Parri Ceci. His younger brother Cole was a goaltender for the Oshawa Generals of the OHL, and currently plays for the Romford Raiders of the NIHL He also has an older sister Chelsea.

Cody left home at the age of 13 to attend Lakefield College School, a private boarding institution just north of Peterborough, Ontario where he graduated in 2011. After being drafted, Ceci joined the Ottawa 67's. While playing with the Ottawa 67's, Ceci attended Carleton University.

== Playing career ==
=== Junior ===
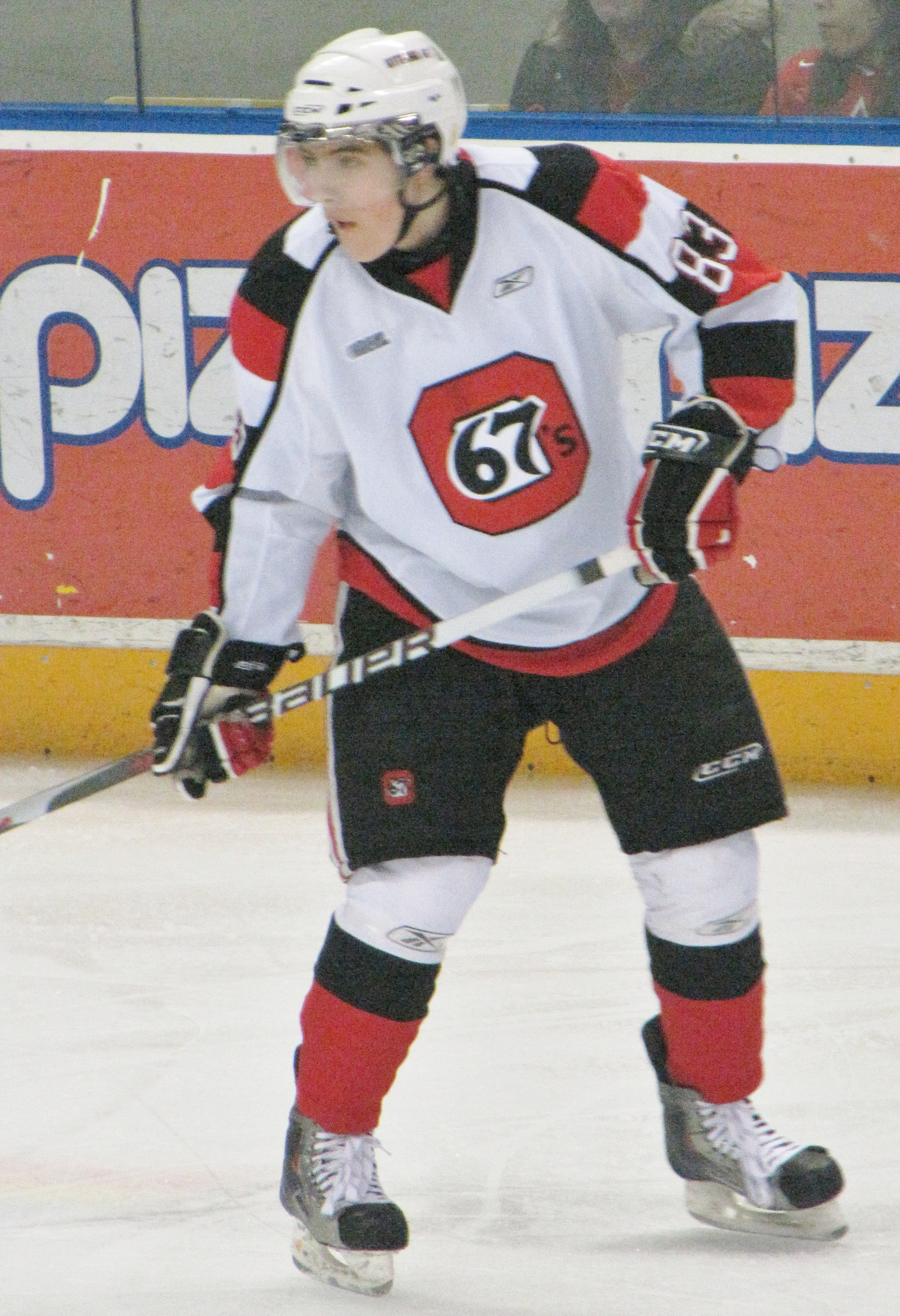
Ceci with the Ottawa 67's for the 2011–12 season.

With the Ottawa 67's in 2011–12, Ceci finished second in scoring amongst all OHL defenceman with 60 points (behind Dougie Hamilton of the Niagara Ice Dogs with 72 points). So eager was Ottawa Senators' GM Bryan Murray to select Ceci that he contacted three different teams early in the 2012 draft in an effort to move up and take the defenceman before another team could. "I honestly never thought he would be available at 15," said Murray. On August 23, 2012, Ceci signed a three-year entry-level contract with the Senators.

On January 8, 2013, in an effort to overtake the London Knights in the OHL's Western Conference, the Owen Sound Attack obtained Ceci from the 67's. Ceci did not have NHL callup rights and was thus able to finish the season in junior. Once the Attack were eliminated, Ceci was called up to finish the season in the AHL with the Binghamton Senators, playing in the team's final three games of the regular season. Paired on defence with team captain Mark Borowiecki, he scored his first professional point in his second game with Binghamton and scored his first professional goal a day later in the season finale.

=== Professional ===
==== Ottawa Senators ====
In October 2013, Ceci was assigned to the Binghamton Senators after training camp. After a suspension to Senators defenceman Jared Cowen, Ceci was called up to Ottawa in December and played his first game in the NHL on December 12, 2013, in Ottawa against the Buffalo Sabres, a 2–1 win for Ottawa. Two games later, on December 16, 2013, at 3:59 of overtime against goaltender Brian Elliott of the St. Louis Blues, Ceci scored his first NHL goal, to win the game 3–2. He was the first teenager in NHL history to score his first NHL goal in overtime. At the beginning of the 2016–17 season, Ceci signed a two-year, $5.6 million contract extension. In the 2016–17 season, he made $2.25 million; in the 2017–18 season, he made $3.35 million.

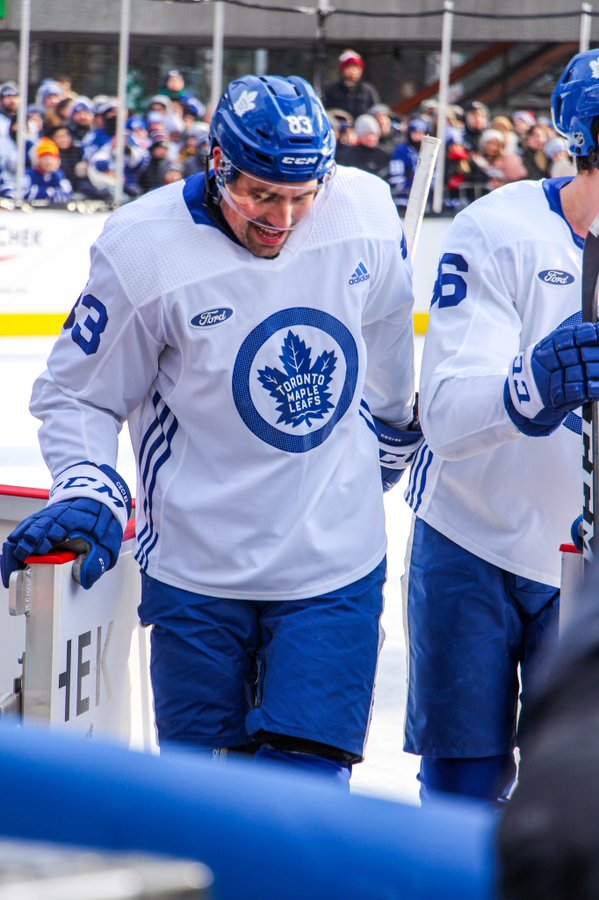
Ceci practicing with the Maple Leafs in January 2020

On August 3, 2018, Ceci agreed to a one-year, $4.3 million contract with the Senators after filing for salary arbitration.

==== Toronto Maple Leafs ====
On July 1, 2019, Ceci was traded by the Senators, along with Ben Harpur, Aaron Luchuk and a 2020 third-round draft pick to the Toronto Maple Leafs in exchange for Connor Brown, Michael Carcone and Nikita Zaitsev. Ceci soon agreed to sign a one-year, $4.5 million contract extension with the Maple Leafs on July 4, 2019. He scored his first goal as a Toronto Maple Leaf on October 4, 2019, in a 4–1 road win over the Columbus Blue Jackets. However, after suffering an ankle injury in February, the Leafs placed Ceci on injured reserve until March 6, 2020.

==== Pittsburgh Penguins ====
On October 17, 2020, Ceci signed as a free agent to a one-year, $1.25 million contract with the Pittsburgh Penguins.

==== Edmonton Oilers ====
On July 28, 2021, Ceci signed as a free agent to a four-year, $13 million contract with the Edmonton Oilers. The signing was initiated by the loss of Oilers defenceman Adam Larsson to the Seattle Kraken, which left a defensive role to be filled. In his first year with the Oilers, he managed five goals and 23 assists during the regular season. During the 2022 Stanley Cup playoffs, Ceci scored the series-clinching goal in game seven of the first-round series against the Los Angeles Kings. The Oilers were swept in the Western Conference Final series by the top-seeded and eventual Stanley Cup champion Colorado Avalanche.

==== San Jose Sharks ====
On August 18, 2024, Ceci was traded to the San Jose Sharks along with a 2025 third-round pick in return for defenceman Ty Emberson.

==== Dallas Stars ====
On February 1, 2025, Ceci, with Mikael Granlund, was traded to the Dallas Stars for a first-round pick and conditional third-round pick in the 2025 NHL entry draft. Due to scheduling, Ceci played 85 regular-season games combined between the Sharks and the Stars, becoming the ninth player in NHL history to play at least 85 games.

==== Los Angeles Kings ====
As a free agent, Ceci signed a four-year, $18 million contract with the Los Angeles Kings on July 1, 2025.

== International play ==
Medal record

Ice hockey

Representing Canada

World Championships
Gold medal – first place	2016 Russia	

Representing (Canada) Team Ontario

World U-17 Hockey Challenge
Silver medal – second place	2010 Canada	

On November 18, 2009, Ceci was selected by Hockey Canada to compete in the 2010 World U-17 Hockey Challenge for Team Ontario. After the season concluded, Ceci was one of 15 OHL players invited to attend Canada’s National Men’s Summer Under-18 Team selection camp on June 11, 2010. He would again qualify to compete for Team Canada during the 2011 IIHF World U18 Championship.

On April 11, 2016, Ceci was one of 18 players selected by Hockey Canada to compete on Team Canada at the 2016 World Championships. He won a gold medal with the team in his senior debut.

== Personal life ==
Ceci owns two French Bulldogs named Zeus and Hugo In 2024, while Ceci played for the Oilers, Hugo ran in the team's annual "Ruff Ruff Relay" and won first place in the competition. Ceci is one-quarter Filipino descent.

== Career statistics ==
=== Regular season and playoffs ===
			Regular season					Playoffs
Season	Team	League	GP	G	A	Pts	PIM	GP	G	A	Pts	PIM
2008–09	Peterborough Minor Petes	ETA	57	24	48	72	26	—	—	—	—	—
2008–09	Peterborough Stars	OJHL	3	0	0	0	2	—	—	—	—	—
2009–10	Ottawa 67's	OHL	64	4	8	12	12	12	0	3	3	0
2010–11	Ottawa 67's	OHL	68	9	25	34	28	4	0	2	2	4
2011–12	Ottawa 67's	OHL	64	17	43	60	14	18	2	13	15	4
2012–13	Ottawa 67's	OHL	42	11	29	40	10	—	—	—	—	—
2012–13	Owen Sound Attack	OHL	27	8	16	24	2	12	1	9	10	0
2012–13	Binghamton Senators	AHL	3	1	1	2	0	3	0	0	0	0
2013–14	Binghamton Senators	AHL	27	2	17	19	10	4	1	1	2	0
2013–14	Ottawa Senators	NHL	49	3	6	9	14	—	—	—	—	—
2014–15	Ottawa Senators	NHL	81	5	16	21	6	6	0	2	2	0
2015–16	Ottawa Senators	NHL	75	10	16	26	18	—	—	—	—	—
2016–17	Ottawa Senators	NHL	79	2	15	17	20	19	0	1	1	2
2017–18	Ottawa Senators	NHL	82	5	14	19	12	—	—	—	—	—
2018–19	Ottawa Senators	NHL	74	7	19	26	18	—	—	—	—	—
2019–20	Toronto Maple Leafs	NHL	56	1	7	8	20	5	1	0	1	4
2020–21	Pittsburgh Penguins	NHL	53	4	13	17	10	6	0	2	2	0
2021–22	Edmonton Oilers	NHL	78	5	23	28	14	16	1	6	7	12
2022–23	Edmonton Oilers	NHL	80	1	14	15	24	12	0	1	1	2
2023–24	Edmonton Oilers	NHL	79	5	20	25	14	24	2	3	5	0
2024–25	San Jose Sharks	NHL	54	4	11	15	14	—	—	—	—	—
2024–25	Dallas Stars	NHL	31	0	9	9	10	18	0	3	3	2
2025–26	Los Angeles Kings	NHL	82	1	8	9	16	4	0	0	0	0
NHL totals			953	53	191	244	210	110	4	18	22	22

=== International ===
Year	Team	Event	Result	GP	G	A	Pts	PIM
2010	Canada Ontario	U17	2nd place, silver medalist(s)	6	0	0	0	0
2011	Canada	U18	4th	7	0	1	1	2
2016	Canada	WC	1st place, gold medalist(s)	10	1	5	6	0
Junior totals				13	0	1	1	2
Senior totals				10	1	5	6	0

== Awards and honours ==
Award	Year	Ref
OHL
Second All-Star Team	2012, 2013	

Awards and achievements
Preceded by Matt Puempel	Ottawa Senators first-round draft pick 2012	Succeeded by Curtis Lazar
