= Matt Puempel =

Canadian ice hockey player (born 1993)

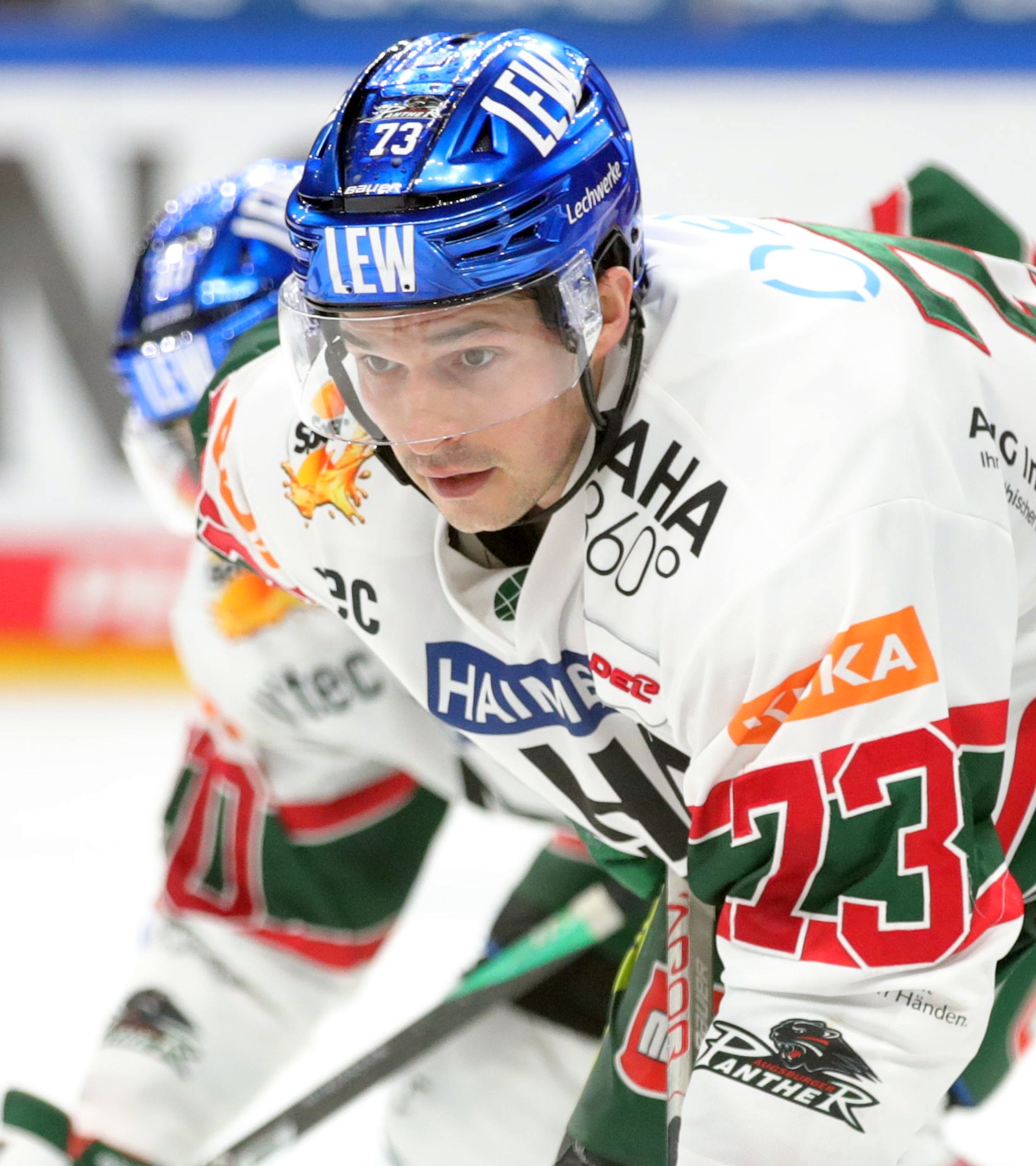
- Puempel with the Augsburger Panther in 2023
- Born: January 24, 1993 (age 33) Windsor, Ontario, Canada
- Height: 6 ft 1 in (185 cm)
- Weight: 205 lb (93 kg; 14 st 9 lb)
- Position: Left wing
- Shoots: Left
- team Former teams: Free agent Ottawa Senators; New York Rangers; Detroit Red Wings; Malmö Redhawks; Augsburger Panther; Schwenninger Wild Wings
- NHL draft: 24th overall, 2011; Ottawa Senators
- Playing career: 2012–present

Matthew Puempel (born January 24, 1993) is a Canadian professional ice hockey player who is currently an unrestricted free agent. He most recently played for the Schwenninger Wild Wings of the Deutsche Eishockey Liga (DEL). Puempel was selected 24th overall in the 2011 NHL entry draft by the Ottawa Senators.

== Playing career ==
=== Amateur ===
Puempel's 2009–10 season was a noteworthy rookie OHL season. Playing for the Peterborough Petes, he led all OHL rookies in goals and points and was second on his team in scoring. His point totals landed him at 39th in overall league scoring and he won the Emms Family Award as well as the CHL Rookie of the Year award. In his second season with the Petes, he was hampered by a back injury just before the season and a bone chip on his hip that required surgery and ended his season prematurely.

On December 8, 2011, Puempel was suspended for 8 games for a hit to the head of forward Sebastian Uvira during a game against the Oshawa Generals. On June 27, 2012, Puempel requested a trade to a contending team and was subsequently dealt to the Kitchener Rangers. "Being around Ottawa and this being my last year of junior, I wanted to win and be a part of a team that is in a different phase of a rebuild," he told the Peterborough Examiner.

=== Professional ===
Eager for the chance to select Puempel, Ottawa traded a pair of second-round picks (35th and 48th overall) to Detroit in order to obtain the 24th overall spot in the draft. Puempel signed an entry-level contract with the Senators on December 29, 2011. He made his professional debut with the Binghamton Senators late in the 2011–12 season. In his first full professional season in 2013–14, Puempel scored 30 goals, tying Mike Hoffman for the Binghamton team goal scoring lead.

In the midst of his second full professional season in Binghamton, Puempel was recalled to Ottawa on February 19, 2015. At the time, he ranked third in Binghamton team scoring with 32 points (12 goals and 20 assists) in 51 regular-season games. On March 10, 2015, Puempel scored his first NHL goal against Tuukka Rask of the Boston Bruins.

In the 2016–17 season, Puempel made the Senators opening night roster. After 13 scoreless games, and relegated to a healthy scratch on occasions, Puempel was placed on waivers by the Senators on November 20, 2016. He was claimed the following day by the New York Rangers.

Puempel recorded his first career hat trick in a 6–3 Rangers win against the Arizona Coyotes on December 29, 2016. All three of Puempel's goals were scored on the power play. On June 14, 2017, the Rangers re-signed Puempel to a one-year extension.

In the lead up to the 2017–18 season, Puempel was assigned to the Rangers' AHL affiliate, the Hartford Wolf Pack, after clearing waivers. On October 21, 2017, Puempel was traded to the Detroit Red Wings in exchange for Ryan Sproul. During the season, Puempel, along with teammate Matt Lorito, were the only two Grand Rapids Griffins players selected to play in the 2018 AHL All-Star Classic game. On September 9, 2018, the Red Wings signed Puempel to a two-year contract extension. On March 22, 2019, Puempel was recalled by the Red Wings. Prior to being recalled, he recorded 24 goals and 26 assists in 59 games for the Griffins. He made his debut for the Red Wings the next night in a game against the Vegas Golden Knights. During the 2018–19 season, Puempel recorded one goal in eight games for the Red Wings. Following the completion of the Red Wings' season, he was reassigned to the Griffins.

After going unsigned through the start of the 2020–21 season, Puempel signed his first contract overseas, agreeing to a deal with the Malmö Redhawks of the SHL on January 16, 2021.

== Personal life ==
Born in Windsor, Puempel was raised in Essex, Ontario with his older brother Mike. He attended Thomas A. Stewart Secondary School while playing for the Petes where he earned OHL Academic Player of the Month for the East Division in January 2010.

== Career statistics ==
=== Regular season and playoffs ===
			Regular season					Playoffs
Season	Team	League	GP	G	A	Pts	PIM	GP	G	A	Pts	PIM
2009–10	Peterborough Petes	OHL	59	33	31	64	43	4	1	1	2	6
2010–11	Peterborough Petes	OHL	55	34	35	69	49	—	—	—	—	—
2011–12	Peterborough Petes	OHL	30	17	16	33	31	—	—	—	—	—
2011–12	Binghamton Senators	AHL	9	1	0	1	2	—	—	—	—	—
2012–13	Kitchener Rangers	OHL	51	35	12	47	43	10	3	4	7	10
2012–13	Binghamton Senators	AHL	2	0	0	0	0	3	2	0	2	0
2013–14	Binghamton Senators	AHL	74	30	18	48	94	1	0	0	0	0
2014–15	Binghamton Senators	AHL	51	12	20	32	31	—	—	—	—	—
2014–15	Ottawa Senators	NHL	13	2	1	3	8	—	—	—	—	—
2015–16	Binghamton Senators	AHL	34	17	13	30	15	—	—	—	—	—
2015–16	Ottawa Senators	NHL	26	2	1	3	9	—	—	—	—	—
2016–17	Ottawa Senators	NHL	13	0	0	0	7	—	—	—	—	—
2016–17	New York Rangers	NHL	27	6	3	9	4	—	—	—	—	—
2017–18	Hartford Wolf Pack	AHL	5	1	2	3	0	—	—	—	—	—
2017–18	Grand Rapids Griffins	AHL	57	22	32	54	21	5	1	3	4	0
2018–19	Grand Rapids Griffins	AHL	62	24	26	50	38	5	2	2	4	16
2018–19	Detroit Red Wings	NHL	8	1	0	1	2	—	—	—	—	—
2019–20	Grand Rapids Griffins	AHL	46	17	22	39	26	—	—	—	—	—
2020–21	Malmö Redhawks	SHL	15	4	1	5	4	2	1	1	2	2
2021–22	Augsburger Panther	DEL	46	22	15	37	13	—	—	—	—	—
2022–23	Augsburger Panther	DEL	23	7	11	18	6	—	—	—	—	—
2023–24	Augsburger Panther	DEL	51	13	16	29	33	—	—	—	—	—
2024–25	Schwenninger Wild Wings	DEL	38	8	5	13	6	3	0	1	1	0
NHL totals			87	11	5	16	30	—	—	—	—	—

Medal record

Representing Canada

Ice hockey

Ivan Hlinka Memorial Tournament
Gold medal – first place	2010 Slovakia	

=== International ===
Year	Team	Event	Result	GP	G	A	Pts	PIM
2010	Canada Ontario	U17	2nd place, silver medalist(s)	6	2	3	5	0
2010	Canada	IH18	1st place, gold medalist(s)	5	3	4	7	2
Junior totals				11	5	7	12	2

== Awards and honours ==
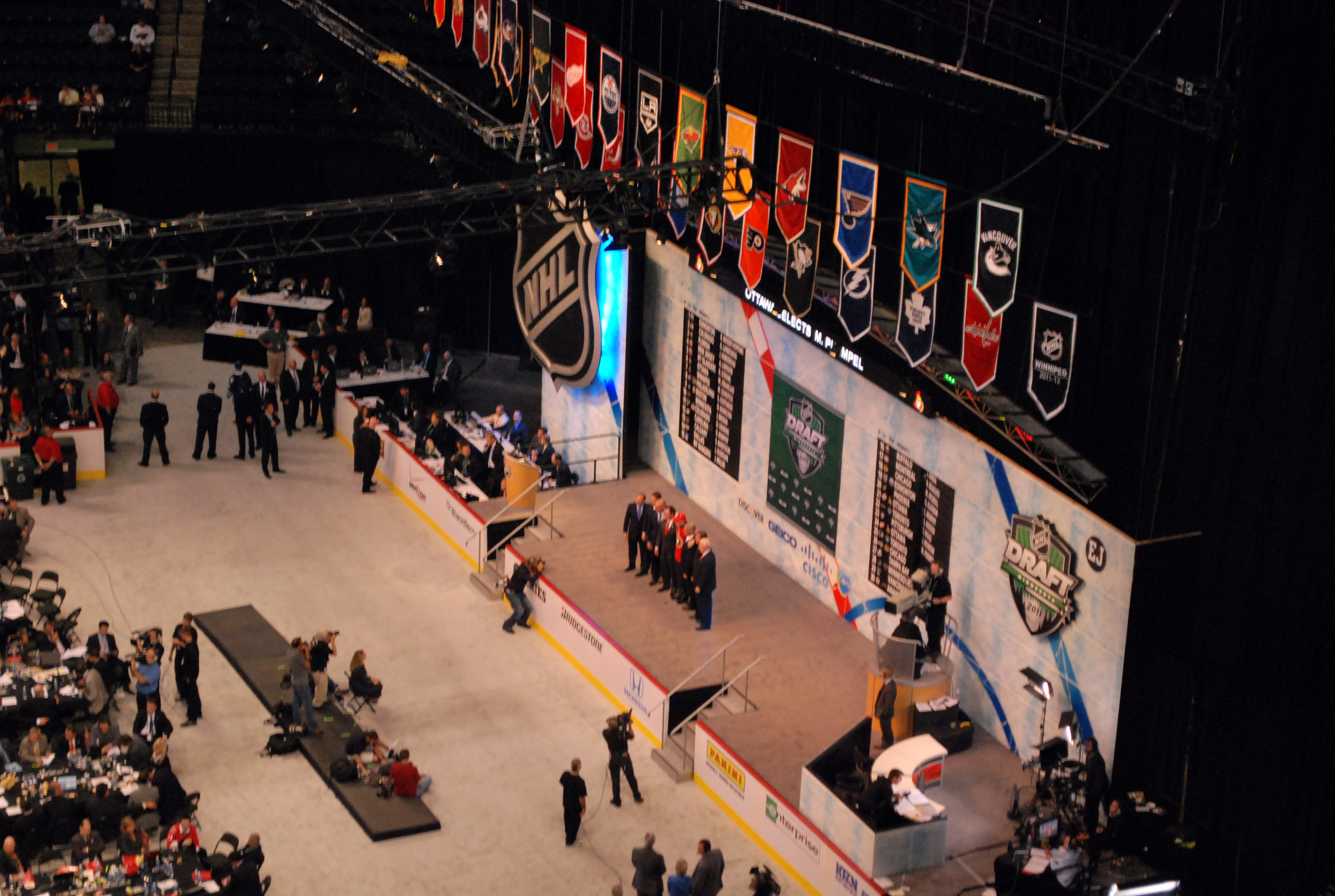
Puempel being selected by the Ottawa Senators at the 2011 NHL entry draft

Award	Year
Junior
CHL Rookie of the Year	2009–10
CHL All-Rookie Team	2009–10
Emms Family Award	2009–10
OHL First All-Rookie Team	2009–10
American Hockey League All-Star Team	2018

Awards and achievements
Preceded by Brett Connolly	Winner of the CHL Rookie of the Year Award; 2009–10	Succeeded by Nail Yakupov
Preceded by Evgeny Grachev	Winner of the Emms Family Award; 2009–10	Succeeded by Nail Yakupov
Preceded by Stefan Noesen	Ottawa Senators first-round draft pick 2011	Succeeded by Cody Ceci
