= 2010 Ivan Hlinka Memorial Tournament =

Tournament details
- Host countries: Slovakia; Czech Republic
- Venue(s): 2 (in 2 host cities)
- Dates: August 9–14, 2010
- Teams: 8

Final positions
- Champions: Canada (15th title)
- Runner-up: United States
- Third place: Sweden
- Fourth place: Czech Republic

Tournament statistics
- Games played: 18
- Goals scored: 137 (7.61 per game)
- Scoring leader(s): (Sweden) Joachim Nermark (5 goals, 6 assists)

The 2010 Ivan Hlinka Memorial Tournament was an under-18 ice hockey tournament held in Břeclav, Czech Republic and Piešťany, Slovakia from August 9–14, 2010. The two venues were Alcaplast Arena in Břeclav and Patrícia Ice Arena 37 in Piešťany. Canada won the gold for the third consecutive year and the 15th time overall. The United States lost in the final to win the silver, their first medal since 2006. Sweden got the bronze for the third consecutive year by defeating the Czech Republic 6-1 in the bronze medal game.

== Preliminary round ==
=== Group A ===
Team	Pld	W	OTW	OTL	L	GF	GA	GD	Pts
United States	3	2	0	1	0	13	10	+3	7
Czech Republic	3	2	0	0	1	9	8	+1	6
Russia	3	0	1	1	1	10	11	−1	3
Finland	3	0	1	0	2	8	11	−3	2

=== Group B ===
Team	Pld	W	OTW	OTL	L	GF	GA	GD	Pts
Canada	3	3	0	0	0	19	7	+12	9
Sweden	3	2	0	0	1	17	10	+7	6
Switzerland	3	1	0	0	2	11	16	−5	3
Slovakia	3	0	0	0	3	6	20	−14	0

== Final round ==
=== Seventh place game ===
August 13, 2010	Finland	6–4	Slovakia	Zimný štadión, Piešťany

=== Fifth place game ===
August 13, 2010	Russia	5–4	Switzerland	Alcaplast Arena, Břeclav

=== Semifinal 1 ===
August 13, 2010	United States	5–4 OT (0–1, 4–2, 0–1, 1-0)	Sweden	Zimný štadión, Piešťany

Game reference

Steve Michalek
Goalies
Marcus Due-Boje

	0 – 1	12:47 - Arvidsson (Rackell, Normark)
	0 – 2	0:44 - Zibanejad (Rask, Johansson) (PP)
Sutter (Hohmann) - 1:36	1 – 2
	1 – 3	4:25 - Johansson (Lundberg)
Sorenson (Selman, Di Pauli) - 5:31	2 - 3
(PP) Sutter - 10:15	3 - 3
(PP) Ambroz (Gaudreau) - 15:55	4 - 3
	4 - 4	15:32 - Arvidsson (Johansson) (PP)
Murphy (Ambroz) - 0:41	5 - 4

=== Semifinal 2 ===
August 13, 2010	Canada	6–2 (3–0, 2–1, 1–1)	Czech Republic	Alcaplast Arena, Břeclav

Game reference

Tyson Teichmann
Goalies
David Honzik

Lessio (Siemens) - 06:10	1 – 0
Quine (Broll) - 10:35	2 – 0
Puempel (Hamilton) - 19:41	3 – 0
(PP) Lessio (Puempel, Danault) - 03:19	4 – 0
	4 - 1	15:19 - Tomek (PP)
Ritchie (Nugent-Hopkins, Murray) - 18:47	5 - 1
Meurs (Bell) - 11:59	6 - 1
	6 - 2	16:07 - Hertl (Jaskin) (PP)

=== Bronze medal game ===
August 14, 2010	Sweden	6–1 (3–0, 2–1, 1–0)	Czech Republic	Alcaplast Arena, Břeclav

Game reference

Nermark (Boyce Rotevall) - 02:22	1 – 0
Danielsson (Porsberger) - 04:49	2 – 0
Åberg (Nermark) - 05:44	3 – 0
Arvidsson (Åberg) - 00:47	4 – 0
	4 – 1	03:37 - Jaškin
Blomquist (Fröberg, Ryan) - 06:55	5 – 1
Nermark (Klefbom, Görtz) - 02:04	6 – 1

=== Gold medal game ===
August 14, 2010	Canada	1–0 (1–0, 0–0, 0–0)	United States	Zimný štadión, Piešťany

Game reference
Tyson Teichmann	Goalies	Steven Michalek
Nugent-Hopkins - 01:42 / 1 – 0

=== Final standings ===
Rk.	Team
1st place, gold medalist(s)	Canada
2nd place, silver medalist(s)	United States
3rd place, bronze medalist(s)	Sweden
4.	Czech Republic
5.	Russia
6.	Switzerland
7.	Finland
8.	Slovakia

== See also ==
- 2010 IIHF World U18 Championships
- 2010 World Junior Championships

Preceded by 2009 Ivan Hlinka Memorial Tournament	Ivan Hlinka Memorial Tournament; 2010	Succeeded by 2011 Ivan Hlinka Memorial Tournament
