= 2008–09 OHL season =

- League: Ontario Hockey League
- Sport: Hockey
- Duration: Preseason; Aug. 29, 2008 – Sept. 14, 2008; Regular season Sept. 17, 2008 – Mar. 15, 2009; Playoffs; Mar. 18, 2009 – May 8, 2009
- Teams: 20
- TV partner(s): Rogers TV, TVCogeco

Draft
- Top draft pick: John McFarland
- Picked by: Sudbury Wolves

Regular season
- Hamilton Spectator Trophy: Windsor Spitfires (1)
- Season MVP: Cody Hodgson (Brampton Battalion)
- Top scorer: John Tavares (Oshawa/London)

Playoffs
- Playoffs MVP: Taylor Hall (Spitfires)
- Finals champions: Windsor Spitfires (2)
- Runners-up: Brampton Battalion

OHL seasons
- 2007–08 2009–10

2008–09 CHL season
- League: Canadian Hockey League
- Sport: Hockey
- Duration: OHL; Sept. 17, 2008 – Mar. 15, 2009; QMJHL; Sept. 11, 2008 – Mar. 15, 2009; WHL; Sept. 18, 2008 – Mar. 15, 2009
- Teams: 60
- TV partner(s): RDS; Rogers Sportsnet; Rogers TV; Shaw TV
- Season MVP: Cody Hodgson (Brampton Battalion) (OHL)
- Top scorer: Yannick Riendeau (Drummondville Voltigeurs) (QMJHL)

Memorial Cup
- Finals champions: Windsor Spitfires (OHL) (1st title)
- Runners-up: Kelowna Rockets (WHL)

The 2008–09 OHL season was the 29th season of the Ontario Hockey League. Twenty teams played 68 games each during the regular season schedule, which started on September 17, 2008 and concluded on March 15, 2009. The OHL inaugurated the Mickey Renaud Captain's Trophy following his death in the previous season. The Windsor Spitfires played their last game at Windsor Arena on December 4, defeating the Guelph Storm, 2–1. The Spitfires played their first game at the WFCU Centre on December 11 against the Belleville Bulls, losing the game 4–0. The playoffs began on March 18, 2009, and ended on May 8, 2009 with the Windsor Spitfires winning the J. Ross Robertson Cup, and a berth in the 2009 Memorial Cup which was held in Rimouski, Quebec. Windsor went on to win the Memorial Cup.

== Regular season ==
=== Final standings ===
Note: DIV = Division; GP = Games played; W = Wins; L = Losses; OTL = Overtime losses; SL = Shootout losses; GF = Goals for; GA = Goals against; PTS = Points; x = clinched playoff berth; y = clinched division title; z = clinched conference title

=== Eastern conference ===
Rank	Team	DIV	GP	W	L	OTL	SL	PTS	GF	GA
1	z-Belleville Bulls	East	68	47	17	2	2	98	258	176
2	y-Brampton Battalion	Central	68	47	19	1	1	96	264	184
3	x-Ottawa 67's	East	68	40	21	5	2	87	272	231
4	x-Mississauga St. Michael's Majors	Central	68	39	26	1	2	81	229	208
5	x-Barrie Colts	Central	68	30	33	3	2	65	214	207
6	x-Niagara IceDogs	Central	68	26	32	4	6	62	213	264
7	x-Peterborough Petes	East	68	28	37	1	2	59	210	266
8	x-Sudbury Wolves	Central	68	26	35	3	4	59	227	282
9	Oshawa Generals	East	68	25	35	2	6	58	213	283
10	Kingston Frontenacs	East	68	18	40	6	4	46	200	278

=== Western conference ===
Rank	Team	DIV	GP	W	L	OTL	SL	PTS	GF	GA
1	z-Windsor Spitfires	West	68	57	10	0	1	115	311	171
2	y-London Knights	Midwest	68	49	16	1	2	101	287	194
3	x-Saginaw Spirit	West	68	36	24	4	4	80	235	219
4	x-Plymouth Whalers	West	68	37	26	5	0	79	253	244
5	x-Sarnia Sting	West	68	35	26	4	3	77	216	210
6	x-Guelph Storm	Midwest	68	35	26	4	3	77	226	209
7	x-Erie Otters	Midwest	68	34	29	3	2	73	233	239
8	x-Owen Sound Attack	Midwest	68	26	27	7	8	67	226	258
9	Kitchener Rangers	Midwest	68	26	37	3	2	57	208	254
10	Sault Ste. Marie Greyhounds	West	68	19	45	2	2	42	172	290

== Scoring leaders ==
Note: GP = Games played; G = Goals; A = Assists; Pts = Points; PIM = Penalty minutes

Player	Team	GP	G	A	Pts	PIM
John Tavares	Oshawa/London	56	58	46	104	54
Chris Terry	Plymouth Whalers	53	39	55	94	75
Justin DiBenedetto	Sarnia Sting	62	45	48	93	85
Cody Hodgson	Brampton Battalion	53	43	49	92	33
Matt Caria	Sault Ste. Marie/Plymouth	67	34	58	92	91
Taylor Hall	Windsor Spitfires	63	38	52	90	60
Ryan Ellis	Windsor Spitfires	57	22	67	89	57
Eric Tangradi	Belleville Bulls	55	38	50	88	61
Logan Couture	Ottawa 67's	62	39	48	87	46
Chris MacKinnon	London/Kitchener	67	26	59	85	56

== Leading goaltenders ==
Note: GP = Games played; Mins = Minutes played; W = Wins; L = Losses: OTL = Overtime losses; SL = Shootout losses; GA = Goals allowed; SO = Shutouts; SV% = Save percentage; GAA = Goals against average

Player	Team	GP	Mins	W	L	OTL	SL	GA	SO	SV%	GAA
Mike Murphy	Belleville Bulls	54	3169	40	9	2	2	110	5	0.941	2.08
Tom McCollum	Guelph/Brampton	54	3192	34	16	2	2	112	7	0.927	2.11
Andrew Engelage	Windsor Spitfires	54	3086	46	4	0	1	121	5	0.914	2.35
Trevor Cann	Peterborough/London	52	3027	35	15	0	1	132	6	0.919	2.62
Daniel Spence	Sarnia Sting	54	3151	29	19	4	2	146	2	0.914	2.78

== Playoffs ==
Conference quarterfinals	Conference Semifinals
1	Belleville	4
8	Sudbury	2
1	Belleville	4
6	Niagara	1
3	Ottawa	3
6	Niagara	4
Eastern
2	Brampton	4
7	Peterborough	0
2	Brampton	4
4	Mississauga	2
4	Mississauga	4
5	Barrie	1
1	Windsor	4
8	Owen Sound	0
1	Windsor	4
4	Plymouth	2
4	Plymouth	4
5	Sarnia	1
Western
2	London	4
7	Erie	1
2	London	4
3	Saginaw	0
3	Saginaw	4
6	Guelph	0

Conference finals
1	Belleville	2
2	Brampton	4
1	Windsor	4
2	London	1

Finals
E2	Brampton	1
W1	Windsor	4

=== Conference quarterfinals ===
==== (1) Belleville Bulls vs. (8) Sudbury Wolves ====
March 18	Belleville Bulls	3 – 1	Sudbury Wolves	Yardmen Arena
No scoring		First period	No scoring
11:41 - Nick Palmieri (1)		Second period	Akim Aliu (1) - 11:18
9:55 - Matthew Tipoff (1); 19:55 - en - Eric Tangradi (1)		Third period	No scoring
Mike Murphy (25 saves / 26 shots)		Goalie stats	Andrew Loverock (35 saves / 37 shots)

March 19	Belleville Bulls	1 – 2	Sudbury Wolves	Yardmen Arena
12:41 - Bryan Cameron (1)		First period	John Kurtz (1) - pp - 18:40
No scoring		Second period	John McFarland (1) - 12:04
No scoring		Third period	No scoring
Mike Murphy (26 saves / 28 shots)		Goalie stats	Andrew Loverock (31 saves / 32 shots)

March 22	Sudbury Wolves	1 – 3	Belleville Bulls	Sudbury Community Arena
No scoring		First period	Luke Pither (1) - 19:04
13:24 - pp - Daniel Maggio (1)		Second period	Eric Tangradi (2) - 19:07
No scoring		Third period	Eric Tangradi (3) - pp - 16:57
Andrew Loverock (26 saves / 29 shots)		Goalie stats	Mike Murphy (29 saves / 30 shots)

March 24	Sudbury Wolves	1 – 2	Belleville Bulls	Sudbury Community Arena
13:39 - pp - Frankie Santini (1)		First period	No scoring
No scoring		Second period	Eric Tangradi (4) - pp - 0:33; Nick Palmieri (2) - pp - 6:51
No scoring		Third period	No scoring
Andrew Loverock (31 saves / 33 shots)		Goalie stats	Mike Murphy (27 saves / 28 shots)

March 25	Sudbury Wolves	6 – 2	Belleville Bulls	Sudbury Community Arena
Matt Dias (1) - 0:59; Matt Dias (2) - 3:39; Matt Dias (3) - pp - 12:37		First period	No scoring
Matt Dias (4) - 19:08		Second period	No scoring
Marcus Foligno (1) - 2:48; Gerome Giudice (1) - en - 19:23		Third period	1:26 - Brandon Mashinter (1); 12:30 - Nick Pageau (1)
Andrew Loverock (43 saves / 45 shots)		Goalie stats	Mike Murphy (21 saves / 26 shots)

March 30	Belleville Bulls	6 – 1	Sudbury Wolves	Yardmen Arena
Bryan Cameron (2) - 12:31; Brandon Mashinter (2) - 19:23		First period	No scoring
Brandon Mashinter (3) - 2:05; Shawn Lalonde (1) - pp - 16:19		Second period	No scoring
Bryan Cameron (3) - 0:46; Cody Alcock (1) - 7:30		Third period	19:37 - pp - Akim Aliu (2)
Mike Murphy (27 saves / 28 shots)		Goalie stats	Andrew Loverock (44 saves / 50 shots)

Belleville wins series 4 – 2

==== (2) Brampton Battalion vs. (7) Peterborough Petes ====
March 20	Brampton Battalion	5 – 2	Peterborough Petes	Powerade Centre
2:36 - pp - Anthony Peluso (1); 9:34 - pp - Matt Duchene (1); 18:58 - pp - Matt Duchene (2)		First period	No scoring
No scoring		Second period	Zach Harnden (1) - sh - 1:51
9:14 - Evgeny Grachev (1); 16:11 - Evgeny Grachev (2)		Third period	Sergey Korostin (1) - 18:42
Tom McCollum (25 saves / 27 shots)		Goalie stats	Jason Missiaen (34 saves / 39 shots)

March 22	Brampton Battalion	5 – 4	OT	Peterborough Petes	Powerade Centre
14:36 - pp - Cody Hodgson (1)		First period		Brett Theberge (1) - pp - 2:51
9:14 - pp - Cody Hodgson (2); 10:57 - Cody Hodgson (3); 14:22 - sh - Evgeny Grachev (3)		Second period		Patrick Daley (1) - 2:00
No scoring		Third period		Zach Harnden (2) - pp - 2:36; Zach Harnden (3) - 15:39
0:54 - Anthony Peluso (2)		First overtime period		No scoring
Tom McCollum (9 saves / 13 shots)		Goalie stats		Jason Missiaen (59 saves / 64 shots)

March 24	Peterborough Petes	2 – 4	Brampton Battalion	Peterborough Memorial Centre
4:16 - Brett Theberge (2)		First period	Anthony Peluso (3) - pp - 7:33
No scoring		Second period	Evgeny Grachev (4) - pp - 0:28; Matt Duchene (3) - 4:37
15:04 - Patrick Daley (2)		Third period	Matt Kang (1) - pp - 7:13
Jason Missiaen (37 saves / 41 shots)		Goalie stats	Tom McCollum (31 saves / 33 shots)

March 26	Peterborough Petes	2 – 3	Brampton Battalion	Peterborough Memorial Centre
No scoring		First period	Matt Duchene (4) - 1:34; Andrew Merrett (1) - 16:46
No scoring		Second period	No scoring
9:38 - Tony Romano (1); 12:45 - Tony Romano (2)		Third period	Brad Albert (1) - 0:27
Jason Missiaen (30 saves / 33 shots)		Goalie stats	Tom McCollum (32 saves / 34 shots)

Brampton wins series 4 – 0

==== (3) Ottawa 67's vs. (6) Niagara IceDogs ====
March 20	Ottawa 67's	3 – 5	Niagara IceDogs	Ottawa Civic Centre
2:48 - Thomas Kiriakou (1); 15:28 - pp - Logan Couture (1)		First period	Drew Schiestel (1) - 0:51
7:13 - pp - Corey Cowick (1)		Second period	Chris DeSousa (1) - pp - 4:52; Freddie Hamilton (1) - 8:46; Michael Hasson (1) - 15:53
No scoring		Third period	Andrew Agozzino (1) - sh - en - 19:18
Chris Perugini (31 saves / 35 shots)		Goalie stats	Jeremy Smith (41 saves / 44 shots)

March 22	Ottawa 67's	6 – 2	Niagara IceDogs	Ottawa Civic Centre
7:02 - pp - Corey Cowick (2); 10:42 - Tyler Toffoli (1)		First period	Dylan MacEachern (1) - 3:53
7:43 - pp - Anthony Nigro (1); 9:34 - sh - Corey Cowick (3); 16:24 - Anthony Nigro (2)		Second period	Alex Pietrangelo (1) - pp - 18:50
11:48 - Cody Lindsay (1)		Third period	No scoring
Chris Perugini (41 saves / 43 shots)		Goalie stats	Jeremy Smith (34 saves / 40 shots)

March 24	Niagara IceDogs	5 – 3	Ottawa 67's	Gatorade Garden City Complex
4:26 - pp - Alex Friesen (1); 9:58 - Marco Insam (1); 18:08 - Mathew Sisca (1)		First period	No scoring
19:49 - pp - Marco Insam (2)		Second period	Thomas Kiriakou (2) - 1:11
15:16 - Freddie Hamilton (2)		Third period	Ryan Martindale (1) - 7:40; Tyler Toffoli (2) - pp - 19:02
Jeremy Smith (34 saves / 37 shots)		Goalie stats	Chris Perugini (10 saves / 13 shots); Adam Courchaine (26 saves / 28 shots)

March 26	Niagara IceDogs	4 – 6	Ottawa 67's	Gatorade Garden City Complex
No scoring		First period	Logan Couture (2) - 0:16
7:55 - Mathew Sisca (2); 11:18 - pp - Drew Schiestel (2); 13:56 - Andrew Agozzino (2)		Second period	Stephen Blunden (1) - 9:19
10:00 - Andrew Agozzino (3)		Third period	Cody Lindsay (2) - 9:03; Thomas Kiriakou (3) - pp - 12:05; Logan Couture (3) - 18:03; Thomas Kiriakou (4) - en - 19:29
Jeremy Smith (41 saves / 46 shots)		Goalie stats	Adam Courchaine (37 saves / 41 shots)

March 28	Niagara IceDogs	4 – 3	Ottawa 67's	Gatorade Garden City Complex
Alex Friesen (2) - 6:04; Mathew Sisca (3) - 13:10		First period	1:46 - Ryan Martindale (2)
Marco Insam (3) - pp - 13:32		Second period	15:05 - pp - Anthony Nigro (3)
Marco Insam (4) - 16:30		Third period	11:36 - Anthony Nigro (4)
Jeremy Smith (37 saves / 40 shots)		Goalie stats	Adam Courchaine (26 saves / 30 shots)

March 30	Ottawa 67's	4 – 0	Niagara IceDogs	Ottawa Civic Centre
No scoring		First period	No scoring
Thomas Kiriakou (5) - 13:15; Thomas Kiriakou (6) - 15:01		Second period	No scoring
Corey Cowick (4) - pp - 15:48; Corey Cowick (5) - 18:28		Third period	No scoring
Adam Courchaine (32 saves / 32 shots)		Goalie stats	Jeremy Smith (46 saves / 50 shots)

March 31	Ottawa 67's	3 – 4	OT	Niagara IceDogs	Ottawa Civic Centre
16:50 - Jon Carnevale (1)		First period		Reggie Traccitto (1) - pp - 19:41
9:17 - pp - Corey Cowick (6); 19:33 - Corey Cowick (7)		Second period		No scoring
No scoring		Third period		Dylan MacEachern (2) - 2:56; Reggie Traccitto (2) - 12:17
No scoring		First overtime period		Andrew Agozzino (4) - 0:13
Adam Courchaine (41 saves / 45 shots)		Goalie stats		Jeremy Smith (32 saves / 35 shots)

Niagara wins series 4 – 3

==== (4) Mississauga St. Michael's Majors vs. (5) Barrie Colts ====
March 20	Mississauga St. Michael's Majors	4 – 3	Barrie Colts	Hershey Centre
4:32 - Dustin Ekelman (1); 15:26 - Rob Flick (1); 18:01 - pp - Jesse Messier (1)		First period	Alex Hutchings (1) - 8:33; Stefan Della Rovere (1) - pp - 11:35; Alex Hutchings (2) - sh - 12:35
16:15 - Michael Pelech (1)		Second period	No scoring
No scoring		Third period	No scoring
Chris Carrozzi (5 saves / 8 shots); J.P. Anderson (19 saves / 19 shots)		Goalie stats	Peter Di Salvo (7 saves / 10 shots); Michael Hutchinson (20 saves / 21 shots)

March 21	Barrie Colts	4 – 7	Mississauga St. Michael's Majors	Barrie Molson Centre
No scoring		First period	11:40 - Dustin Ekelman (2)
Taylor Carnevale (1) - 5:23; Darren Archibald (1) - pp - 9:36		Second period	4:19 - Devante Smith-Pelly (1); 19:26 - pp - Jordan Mayer (1)
Josh Brittain (1) - 4:28; Colin Behenna (1) - 5:32		Third period	3:14 - Casey Cizikas (1); 17:22 - Jordan Mayer (2); 19:39 - en - Jared Gomes (1)
Michael Hutchinson (42 saves / 48 shots)		Goalie stats	J.P. Anderson (29 saves / 33 shots)

March 23	Mississauga St. Michael's Majors	7 – 3	Barrie Colts	Hershey Centre
Casey Cizikas (3) - 6:44; Cameron Gaunce (1) - 14:47; Michael Pelech (2) - 15:04; Jared Gomes (2) - pp - 19:55		First period	No scoring
Jesse Messier (2) - pp - 0:44; Corey Bureau (1) - 8:05; Casey Cizikas (4) - sh - 17:06		Second period	11:41 - pp- Ryan Gottschalk (1)
No scoring		Third period	1:16 - Darren Archibald (2); 5:31 - Darren Archibald (3)
J.P. Anderson (29 saves / 32 shots)		Goalie stats	Michael Hutchinson (6 saves / 9 shots); Peter Di Salvo (20 saves / 24 shots)

March 26	Barrie Colts	3 – 2	OT	Mississauga St. Michael's Majors	Barrie Molson Centre
11:45 - Michael Sgarbossa (1)		First period		Jared Gomes (3) - 0:36; Kaspars Daugaviņš - pp - 1:36
19:43 - Michael Sgarbossa (2)		Second period		No scoring
No scoring		Third period		No scoring
5:47 - Darren Archibald (4)		First overtime period		No scoring
Peter Di Salvo (36 saves / 38 shots)		Goalie stats		J.P. Anderson (39 saves / 42 shots)

March 28	Barrie Colts	3 – 4	3OT	Mississauga St. Michael's Majors	Barrie Molson Centre
Stefan Della Rovere (2) - 10:40; Alex Hutchings (3) - 11:41; Michael Sgarbossa (3) - 17:54		First period		No scoring
No scoring		Second period		6:06 - pp - Cameron Gaunce (2); 7:37 - pp - Kaspars Daugaviņš (2); 14:18 - pp - Cameron Gaunce
No scoring		Third period		No scoring
No scoring		Third overtime period		18:05 - Devante Smith-Pelly (2)
Peter Di Salvo (84 saves / 88 shots)		Goalie stats		J.P. Anderson (68 saves / 71 shots)

Mississauga wins series 4 – 1

==== (1) Windsor Spitfires vs. (8) Owen Sound Attack ====
March 18	Windsor Spitfires	7 – 4	Owen Sound Attack	WFCU Centre
7:33 - pp - Ryan Ellis (1); 9:57 - pp - Rob Kwiet (1); 15:21 - Greg Nemisz (1)		First period	No scoring
3:21 - Eric Wellwood (1); 6:53 - Rob Kwiet (2)		Second period	Joey Hishon (1) - pp - 14:01
16:03 - Ryan Ellis (2); 19:48 - en - Taylor Hall (1)		Third period	David Kolomatis (1) - pp - 7:47; Mike Lomas (1) - pp - 17:57; Joe Vanni (1) - 18:42
Andrew Engelage (19 saves / 23 shots)		Goalie stats	Tyler Beskorowany (18 saves / 23 shots); Scott Stajcer (29 saves / 30 shots)

March 20	Owen Sound Attack	5 – 7	Windsor Spitfires	Harry Lumley Bayshore Community Centre
Milan Dóczy (1) - pp - 2:22; Joey Hishon (2) - 2:57; Mike Lomas (2) - 5:08; Joey Hishon (3) - 19:31		First period	15:56 - Justin Shugg (1)
No scoring		Second period	13:34 - Dale Mitchell (1); 17:48 - pp - Ryan Ellis (3); 19:29 - pp - Taylor Hall (2)
Garrett Wilson (1) - 19:02		Third period	0:06 - Ryan Ellis (4); 0:50 - Taylor Hall (3); 5:41 - pp - Rob Kwiet (3)
Scott Stajcer (64 saves / 71 shots)		Goalie stats	Andrew Engelage (0 saves / 3 shots); Josh Unice (26 saves / 28 shots)

March 22	Windsor Spitfires	6 – 1	Owen Sound Attack	WFCU Centre
Eric Wellwood (2) - 1:36; Eric Wellwood (3) - 3:59; Dale Mitchell (2) - 19:47		First period	4:39 - Mike Lomas (3)
Lane MacDermid (1) - 11:37; Taylor Hall (4) - pp - 12:58; Taylor Hall (5) - 19:37		Second period	No scoring
No scoring		Third period	No scoring
Andrew Engelage (29 saves / 30 shots)		Goalie stats	Scott Stajcer (47 saves / 53 shots)

March 25	Owen Sound Attack	3 – 6	Windsor Spitfires	Harry Lumley Bayshore Community Centre
5:39 - pp - David Kolomatis (2); 12:54 - pp - Joey Hishon (4)		First period	Dale Mitchell (3) - 18:50
15:00 - Grant McGee (1)		Second period	Taylor Hall (6) - 0:43; Dale Mitchell (4) - 15:09; Greg Nemisz (2) - 16:26; Eric Wellwood (4) - 19:59
No scoring		Third period	Taylor Hall (7) - 17:59
Scott Stajcer (51 saves / 57 shots)		Goalie stats	Andrew Engelage (13 saves / 16 shots); Josh Unice (12 saves / 12 shots)

Windsor wins series 4 – 0

* Note: Game 1 was played at Windsor Arena.

==== (2) London Knights vs. (7) Erie Otters ====
March 20	London Knights	5 – 2	Erie Otters	John Labatt Centre
9:57 - Philip McRae (1)		First period	Shawn Szydlowski (1) - 0:09; Greg McKegg (1) - 16:49
7:23 - Nazem Kadri (1)		Second period	No scoring
6:27 - Philip McRae (2); 9:50 - pp - Phil Varone (1); 19:02 - en - John Tavares (1)		Third period	No scoring
Trevor Cann (45 saves / 47 shots)		Goalie stats	Jaroslav Janus (32 saves / 36 shots)

March 21	London Knights	8 – 1	Erie Otters	John Labatt Centre
10:34 - pp - Nazem Kadri (2)		First period	Shawn Szydlowski (2) - 18:21
1:55 - Nazem Kadri (3); 17:02 - Nazem Kadri (4)		Second period	No scoring
1:31 - John Tavares (2); 3:07 - Dominic DeSando (1); 4:35 - sh - Scott Aarssen (1); 8:20 - Phil Varone (2); 12:02 - pp - Justin Taylor (1)		Third period	No scoring
Trevor Cann (28 saves / 29 shots)		Goalie stats	Jaroslav Janus (40 saves / 47 shots); Shane Owen (6 saves / 7 shots)

March 25	Erie Otters	4 – 0	London Knights	Tullio Arena
2:49 - pp - Zack Torquato (1); 18:23 - sh - Brandon Biggers (1)		First period	No scoring
No scoring		Second period	No scoring
15:58 - sh - Shawn Szydlowski (3); 17:58 - sh - en - Zack Torquato (2)		Third period	No scoring
Jaroslav Janus (29 saves / 29 shots)		Goalie stats	Trevor Cann (26 saves / 29 shots); Stephen Heming (0 saves / 0 shots)

March 26	Erie Otters	2 – 4	London Knights	Tullio Arena
11:17 - pp - Greg McKegg (2)		First period	Michael Del Zotto (1) - pp - 12:51
16:56 - Tyler Hostetter (1)		Second period	Phil Varone (3) - 6:37; Scott Aarssen (2) - 19:56
No scoring		Third period	Justin Taylor (2) - sh - en - 19:29
Jaroslav Janus (29 saves / 32 shots)		Goalie stats	Trevor Cann (23 saves / 25 shots)

March 28	London Knights	6 – 2	Erie Otters	John Labatt Centre
3:19 - pp - John Tavares (3); 17:05 - Phil Varone (4)		First period	No scoring
10:15 - pp - Phil Varone (5); 13:03 - pp - Justin Taylor (3)		Second period	Sean Jones (1) - 2:06; Mike Cazzola (1) - pp - 3:28
6:15 - pp - John Tavares (4); 16:40 - Leigh Salters (1)		Third period	No scoring
Trevor Cann (36 saves / 38 shots)		Goalie stats	Jaroslav Janus (46 saves / 52 shots)

London wins series 4 – 1

===== (3) Saginaw Spirit vs. (6) Guelph Storm =====
March 21	Saginaw Spirit	6 – 5	2OT	Guelph Storm	Dow Event Center
4:06 - sh - Tyler Murovich (1); 9:24 - Jack Combs (1)		First period		Matt Kennedy (1) - 3:04; Denis Hollenstein (1) - 14:06; Yves Bastien (1) - pp - 18:12
2:49 - Jordan Szwarz (1); 4:02 - Kyle Bochek (1); 8:21 - Jordan Skellett (1)		Second period		Brandon Buck (1) - 19:57
No scoring		Third period		Matt Kennedy (2) - 4:15
18:01 - Jack Combs (2)		Second overtime period		No scoring
Edward Pasquale (69 saves / 74 shots)		Goalie stats		Brandon Foote (47 saves / 53 shots)

March 22	Guelph Storm	2 – 3	Saginaw Spirit	Sleeman Centre
No scoring		First period	10:42 - pp - Jack Combs (3)
No scoring		Second period	1:04 - pp - T.J. Brodie (1)
Brandon Buck (2) - 5:31; Tyler Melancon (1) - 12:44		Third period	11:41 - ps - Jack Combs (4)
Brandon Foote (38 saves / 41 shots)		Goalie stats	Edward Pasquale (42 saves / 44 shots)

March 24	Saginaw Spirit	7 – 6	2OT	Guelph Storm	Dow Event Center
Kyle Bochek (2) - 5:32; Joe Pleckaitis (1) - 5:43		First period		9:29 - sh - Brandon Buck (3); 13:39 - Peter Holland (1)
Jack Combs (5) - 1:48; Jack Combs (6) - 4:00		Second period		14:55 - pp - Tyler Carroll (1)
Tyler Murovich (2) - pp - 4:24; Chris Chappell (1) - 11:16		Third period		8:25 - Peter Holland (2); 9:53 - Matt Kennedy (3); 15:26 - Peter Holland (3)
T.J. Brodie (2) - pp - 5:40		Second overtime period		No scoring
Edward Pasquale (48 saves / 54 shots)		Goalie stats		Brandon Foote (46 saves / 53 shots)

March 26	Guelph Storm	1 – 4	Saginaw Spirit	Sleeman Centre
8:07 - Peter Holland (4)		First period	No scoring
No scoring		Second period	Richard Jarůšek (1) - 4:09; Chris Chappell (2) - 6:49
No scoring		Third period	Nick Crawford (1) - sh - en - 18:28; T.J. Brodie (3) - 19:30
Jake Fischer (44 saves / 47 shots)		Goalie stats	Edward Pasquale (20 saves / 21 shots)

Saginaw wins series 4 – 0

===== (4) Plymouth Whalers vs. (5) Sarina Sting =====
March 21	Plymouth Whalers	0 – 2	Sarnia Sting	Compuware Arena
No scoring		First period	Jamie Arniel (1) - pp - 16:25
No scoring		Second period	No scoring
No scoring		Third period	Matt Martin (1) - en - 18:31
Matt Hackett (31 saves / 32 shots)		Goalie stats	Daniel Spence (52 saves / 52 shots)

March 22	Sarnia Sting	2 – 3	OT	Plymouth Whalers	Sarnia Sports and Entertainment Centre
Marcus Pepe (1) - 2:02; Matt Martin (2) - 5:03		First period		12:35 - Matt Caria (1)
No scoring		Second period		19:33 - pp - Matt Caria (2)
No scoring		Third period		No scoring
No scoring		First overtime period		5:20 - pp - Matt Caria (3)
Daniel Spence (46 saves / 49 shots)		Goalie stats		Matt Hackett (32 saves / 34 shots)

March 24	Plymouth Whalers	5 – 1	Sarnia Sting	Compuware Arena
Joe Gaynor (1) - 3:57; Tyler Seguin (1) - 5:57; Chris Terry (1) - 12:40; Chris Terry (2) - 16:59		First period	13:50 - pp - Matt Martin (3)
No scoring		Second period	No scoring
Ryan Hayes (1) - pp - 7:11		Third period	No scoring
Matt Hackett (47 saves / 48 shots)		Goalie stats	Daniel Spence (43 saves / 48 shots)

March 26	Sarnia Sting	0 – 5	Plymouth Whalers	Sarnia Sports and Entertainment Centre
No scoring		First period	Tyler Brown (1) - 4:39; Tyler Seguin (2) - 19:11
No scoring		Second period	Matt Caria (4) - pp - 12:14; Matt Caria (4) - pp - 13:26; Ryan Hayes (2) - 15:27
No scorning		Third period	No scoring
Daniel Spence (27 saves / 32 shots)		Goalie stats	Matt Hackett (27 saves / 27 shots)

March 28	Plymouth Whalers	8 – 1	Sarnia Sting	Compuware Arena
17:08 - Ryan Hayes (3)		First period	No scoring
0:15 - Kaine Geldart (1); 1:07 - Chris Terry (3); 2:12 - A.J. Jenks (1); 6:46 - pp - Chris Terry (4); 7:25 - Joe Gaynor (2); 13:34 - Chris Terry (5)		Second period	Mark Katic (1) - 18:31
12:49 - pp - Beau Schmitz (1)		Third period	No scoring
Matt Hackett (27 saves / 28 shots)		Goalie stats	Daniel Spence (16 saves / 22 shots); Shayne Campbell (12 saves / 14 shots)

Plymouth wins series 4 – 1

=== Conference semifinals ===
==== (1) Belleville Bulls vs. (6) Niagara IceDogs ====
April 2	Belleville Bulls	4 – 3	OT	Niagara IceDogs	Yardmen Arena
11:32 - pp - Bryan Cameron (4)		First period		Andrew Shaw (1) - 8:05; Mathew Sisca (4) - 14:27
9:58 - pp - Luke Pither (2); 16:25 - Brandon Mashinter (4)		Second period		Andrew Agozzino (5) - 12:16
No scoring		Third period		No scoring
2:36 - Luke Pither (3)		First overtime period		No scoring
Mike Murphy (19 saves / 22 shots)		Goalie stats		Jeremy Smith (41 saves / 45 shots)

April 3	Niagara IceDogs	4 – 5	OT	Belleville Bulls	Gatorade Garden City Complex
Andrew Agozzino (6) - pp - 9:21		First period		0:38 - Bryan Cameron (5); 1:11 - Brandon Mashinter (5); 2:49 - Scott Howe (1)
Andrew Shaw (2) - 18:53		Second period		No scoring
Patrick Lee (1) - pp - 2:54; Alex Friesen (3) - pp - 3:26		Third period		17:33 - Cory Tanaka (1)
No scoring		First overtime period		1:58 - pp - P.K. Subban (1)
Jeremy Smith (45 saves / 50 shots)		Goalie stats		Mike Murphy (38 saves / 42 shots)

April 5	Belleville Bulls	0 – 2	Niagara IceDogs	Yardmen Arena
No scoring		First period	No scoring
No scoring		Second period	No scoring
No scoring		Third period	14:15 - Chris DeSousa (2); 19:53 - en - Chris DeSousa (3)
Mike Murphy (22 saves / 23 shots)		Goalie stats	Jeremy Smith (50 saves / 50 shots)

April 7	Niagara IceDogs	2 – 5	Belleville Bulls	Gatorade Garden City Complex
No scoring		First period	Eric Tangradi (5) - 14:59
4:12 - Mathew Sisca (5)		Second period	Bryan Cameron (6) - pp - 1:14; Eric Tangradi (6) - 7:43; Eric Tangradi (7) - 9:37
17:06 - pp - Patrick Lee (2)		Third period	Eric Tangradi (8) - 17:28
Jeremy Smith (43 saves / 48 shots)		Goalie stats	Mike Murphy (30 saves / 32 shots)

April 9	Belleville Bulls	5 – 2	Niagara IceDogs	Yardmen Arena
6:32 - pp - Luke Pither (4)		First period	No scoring
8:46 - Luke Pither (5); 14:33 - Nick Palmieri (3)		Second period	No scoring
14:33 - Nick Palmieri (4); 19:33 - en - Nick Palmieri (5)		Third period	Mathew Sisca (6) - pp - 13:59; Mathew Sisca (7) - 16:12
Mike Murphy (39 saves / 41 shots)		Goalie stats	Jeremy Smith (38 saves / 42 shots)

Belleville wins series 4 – 1

* Note: Game 4 was played at Jack Gatecliff Arena.

==== (2) Brampton Battalion vs. (4) Mississauga St. Michael's Majors ====
April 2	Brampton Battalion	3 – 0	Mississauga St. Michael's Majors	Powerade Centre
3:57 - Evgeny Grachev (5); 11:18 - Josh Day (1)		First period	No scoring
19:10 - Thomas Stajan (1)		Second period	No scoring
No scoring		Third period	No scoring
Tom McCollum (21 saves / 21 shots)		Goalie stats	J.P. Anderson (41 saves / 44 shots)

April 3	Mississauga St. Michael's Majors	1 – 2	Brampton Battalion	Hershey Centre
No scoring		First period	No scoring
Jesse Messier (3) - 16:28		Second period	14:51 - Matt Kang (2)
No scoring		Third period	12:05 - Matt Duchene (5)
J.P. Anderson (33 saves / 35 shots)		Goalie stats	Tom McCollum (29 saves / 30 shots)

April 5	Brampton Battalion	1 – 5	Mississauga St. Michael's Majors	Powerade Centre
No scoring		First period	6:01 - Brett Flemming (1); 19:09 - Jordan Mayer (3)
Anthony Peluso (4) - pp - 9:56		Second period	0:15 - Kale Kerbashian (1); 4:59 - Michael Pelech (3)
No scoring		Third period	11:08 - pp - William Wallén (1)
Tom McCollum (18 saves / 23 shots)		Goalie stats	J.P. Anderson (35 saves / 36 shots)

April 7	Mississauga St. Michael's Majors	4 – 3	OT	Brampton Battalion	Hershey Centre
13:56 - pp - Jordan Mayer (4)		First period		Matt Duchene (6) - pp - 19:55
8:48 - Scott Tanski (1)		Second period		Cameron Gaunce (4) - 3:56
2:25 - Casey Cizikas (5)		Third period		Evgeny Grachev (6) - 19:25
7:58 - pp - William Wallén (2)		First overtime period		No scoring
J.P. Anderson (33 saves / 36 shots)		Goalie stats		Tom McCollum (25 saves / 29 shots)

April 9	Brampton Battalion	4 – 2	Mississauga St. Michael's Majors	Powerade Centre
9:59 - pp - Anthony Peluso (5)		First period
7:09 - pp - Cody Hodgson (4); 14:24 - Sam Carrick (1); 16:49 - Evgeny Grachev (7)		Second period	No scoring
No scoring		Third period	Michael Pelech (4) - pp - 2:39; Josh McFadden (1) - 10:55
Tom McCollum (28 saves / 30 shots)		Goalie stats	J.P. Anderson (26 saves / 30 shots); Chris Carrozzi (11 saves / 11 shots)

April 10	Mississauga St. Michael's Majors	2 – 3	Brampton Battalion	Hershey Centre
9:51 - pp - Jared Gomes (4)		First period	Ken Peroff (1) - 2:35; Matt Duchene (7) - pp - 15:15
12:01 - sh - Jared Gomes (5)		Second period	Matt Kang (3) - 14:57
No scoring		Third period	No scoring
J.P. Anderson (24 saves / 27 shots)		Goalie stats	Tom McCollum (22 saves / 24 shots)

Brampton wins series 4 – 2

==== Western conference ====
===== (1) Windsor Spitfires vs. (4) Plymouth Whalers =====
April 2	Windsor Spitfires	3 – 6	Plymouth Whalers	WFCU Centre
3:11 - pp - Dale Mitchell (5)		First period	Chris Terry (6) - 3:31; Tyler Seguin (3) - pp - 9:59
3:21 - Dale Mitchell (6); 19:11 - sh - Scott Timmins (1)		Second period	Joe Gaynor (3) - 10:32; Brett Bellemore (1) - sh - 14:18
No scoring		Third period	Matt Caria (6) - 2:39; Tyler Seguin (4) - 8:51
Josh Unice (13 saves / 17 shots); Andrew Engelage (11 saves / 13 shots)		Goalie stats	Matt Hackett (46 saves / 49 shots)

April 4	Plymouth Whalers	2 – 8	Windsor Spitfires	Compuware Arena
Tyler Brown (1) - sh - 4:04		First period	0:55 - Ryan Ellis (5); 2:45 - pp - Adam Henrique (1)
Tyler Seguin (5) - 4:54		Second period	0:38 - pp - Greg Nemisz (3); 1:48 - Andrei Loktionov (1); 9:03 - pp - Ryan Ellis (6); 12:51 - pp - Greg Nemisz (4); 19:17 - pp - Dale Mitchell (7)
No scoring		Third period	2:08 - pp - Andrei Loktionov (2)
Matt Hackett (44 saves / 51 shots); Scott Wedgewood (20 saves / 21 shots)		Goalie stats	Andrew Engelage (19 saves / 21 shots)

April 5	Windsor Spitfires	8 – 1	Plymouth Whalers	WFCU Centre
No scoring		First period	No scoring
Adam Henrique (2) - 1:46; Andrei Loktionov (3) - 5:00; Andrei Loktionov (4) - 10:46; Dale Mitchell (8) - 16:54		Second period	No scoring
Greg Nemisz (5) - pp - 6:51; Taylor Hall (8) - pp - 10:57; Dale Mitchell (9) - pp - 14:36; Adam Henrique (3) - pp - 16:42		Third period	9:50 - pp - Beau Schmitz (2)
Andrew Engelage (29 saves / 30 shots)		Goalie stats	Matt Hackett (36 saves / 43 shots); Scott Wedgewood (6 saves / 7 shots)

April 7	Plymouth Whalers	3 – 2	Windsor Spitfires	Compuware Arena
No scoring		First period	No scoring
0:53 - pp - Chris Terry (7); 6:51 - Matt Caria (7)		Second period	Dale Mitchell (10) - 19:58
15:34 - Ryan Hayes (4)		Third period	Eric Wellwood (5) - 13:16
Matt Hackett (37 saves / 39 shots)		Goalie stats	Andrew Engelage (28 saves / 31 shots)

April 9	Windsor Spitfires	5 – 2	Plymouth Whalers	WFCU Centre
No scoring		First period	R.J. Mahalak (1) - 8:16
3:27 - Taylor Hall (9); 8:12 - pp - Rob Kwiet (4); 16:06 - pp - Scott Timmins (2)		Second period	No scoring
17:37 - Greg Nemisz (6); 18:28 - Justin Shugg (2)		Third period	Matt Caria (8) - pp - 17:15
Andrew Engelage (20 saves / 22 shots)		Goalie stats	Matt Hackett (55 saves / 60 shots); Scott Wedgewood (1 save / 1 shot)

April 11	Plymouth Whalers	2 – 4	Windsor Spitfires	Compuware Arena
No scoring		First period	Dale Mitchell (11) - 5:54; Adam Henrique (4) - 6:53
10:23 - Ryan Hayes (5)		Second period	No scoring
6:01 - Matt Caria (9)		Third period	Adam Henrique (5) - 1:02; Adam Henrique (6) - en - 19:17
Matt Hackett (40 saves / 43 shots)		Goalie stats	Andrew Engelage (32 saves / 34 shots)

Windsor wins series 4 – 2

===== (2) London Knights vs. (3) Saginaw Spirit =====
April 2	London Knights	7 – 3	Saginaw Spirit	John Labatt Centre
10:37 - Jared Knight (1); 12:29 - pp - Nazem Kadri (5); 15:36 - pp - Philip McRae (3)		First period	No scoring
5:13 - John Carlson (1); 14:50 - Nazem Kadri (6)		Second period	Tyler Murovich (3) - pp - 6:38
3:03 - Philip McRae (4); 3:44 - Phil Varone (6)		Third period	Mitch Fillman (1) - 2:35; Jack Combs (7) - 10:06
Trevor Cann (32 saves / 35 shots)		Goalie stats	Edward Pasquale (25 saves / 32 shots); Anthony Peters (3 saves / 3 shots)

April 4	Saginaw Spirit	3 – 4	London Knights	Dow Event Center
Tyler Murovich (4) - 2:46		First period	6:51 - pp - Michael Del Zotto (2); 7:10 - Jared Knight (2)
No scoring		Second period	12:39 - pp - John Tavares (5); 13:23 - pp - Phil Varone (7)
Jack Combs (8) - pp - 2:26; Joe Pleckaitis (2) - 6:22		Third period	No scoring
Edward Pasquale (30 saves / 34 shots)		Goalie stats	Trevor Cann (27 saves / 30 shots)

April 5	London Knights	4 – 1	Saginaw Spirit	John Labatt Centre
Phil Varone (8) - 19:28		First period	No scoring
Nazem Kadri (7) - pp - 9:15; Matt Clarke (1) - pp - 12:56		Second period	1:58 - Joe Underwood (1)
Daniel Erlich (1) - 2:49		Third period	No scoring
Trevor Cann (21 saves / 22 shots)		Goalie stats	Edward Pasquale (28 saves / 32 shots)

April 7	Saginaw Spirit	3 – 5	London Knights	Dow Event Center
13:29 - pp - Joe Pleckaitis (3)		First period	Nazem Kadri (8) - pp - 6:37; Daniel Erlich (2) - pp - 11:12
1:38 - pp - Jack Combs		Second period	John Carlson (2) - 18:40
19:25 - Kyle Bochek (3)		Third period	Jared Knight (3) - 3:24; John Tavares (6) - 15:40
Edward Pasquale (29 saves / 34 shots)		Goalie stats	Trevor Cann (15 saves / 18 shots)

London wins series 4 – 0

=== Eastern Conference ===
==== (1) Belleville Bulls vs. (2) Brampton Battalion ====
April 15	Belleville Bulls	2 – 4	Brampton Battalion	Yardmen Arena
6:27 - P.K. Subban (2)		First period	Cody Hodgson (5) - pp - 8:51
No scoring		Second period	Matt Kang (4) - 1:52; Matt Duchene (8) - 5:03; Matt Kang (5) - 13:23
7:12 - P.K. Subban (3)		Third period	No scoring
Mike Murphy (33 saves / 37 shots)		Goalie stats	Tom McCollum (28 saves / 30 shots)

April 17	Brampton Battalion	7 – 2	Belleville Bulls	Powerade Centre
Cody Hodgson (6) - 0:10; Matt Duchene (9) - 0:42; Jason Dale (1) - 3:38; Ken Peroff (2) - 7:51		First period	3:05 - pp - Nick Pageau (2); 13:45 - Luke Pither (6)
Evgeny Grachev (8) - 6:36		Second period	No scoring
Thomas Stajan (2) - 10:10; Evgeny Grachev (9) - 14:19		Third period	No scoring
Tom McCollum (20 saves / 22 shots)		Goalie stats	Mike Murphy (4 saves / 7 shots); Philipp Grubauer (37 saves / 41 shots)

April 19	Belleville Bulls	6 – 2	Brampton Battalion	Yardmen Arena
Nick Palmieri (6) - 12:57		First period	10:02 - Anthony Peluso (6); 17:08 - Anthony Peluso (7)
Nick Palmieri (7) - 7:43; Brandon Mashinter (6) - pp - 16:14; Shawn Lalonde (2) - 17:53; Nick Palmieri (8) - 18:56		Second period	No scoring
Shawn Lalonde (3) - pp - 19:42		Third period	No scoring
Mike Murphy (27 saves / 29 shots)		Goalie stats	Tom McCollum (27 saves / 33 shots)

April 21	Brampton Battalion	4 – 3	Belleville Bulls	Powerade Centre
No scoring		First period	Nick Palmieri (9) - 4:03
17:54 - Matt Duchene (10)		Second period	Bryan Cameron (7) - pp - 3:04
2:00 - Thomas Stajan (3); 3:25 - Scott Tanski (2); 13:47 - Scott Tanski (3)		Third period	Nick Palmieri (10) - 19:06
Tom McCollum (17 saves / 20 shots)		Goalie stats	Mike Murphy (21 saves / 25 shots)

April 23	Belleville Bulls	3 – 2	2OT	Brampton Battalion	Yardmen Arena
0:51 - Nick Palmieri (11)		First period		No scoring
13:30 - pp - Matthew Tipoff (2)		Second period		Cody Hodgson (7) - 0:53; Evgeny Grachev (10) - 19:50
No scoring		Third period		No scoring
18:44 - pp - Nick Palmieri (12)		Second overtime period		No scoring
Mike Murphy (54 saves / 56 shots)		Goalie stats		Tom McCollum (34 saves / 37 shots)

April 24	Brampton Battalion	7 – 4	Belleville Bulls	Powerade Centre
3:55 - Jason Dale (2); 14:47 - pp - Matt Duchene (11)		First period	No scoring
No scoring		Second period	Brandon Mashinter (7) - 1:15; Nick Palmieri (13) - pp - 9:34; Nick Palmieri (14) - 14:14
2:03 - pp - Matt Duchene (12); 6:49 - Cody Hodgson (8); 7:26 - Matt Duchene (13); 18:54 - en - Evgeny Grachev (11); 19:57 - en - Cody Hodgson (9)		Third period	Brandon Mashinter (8) - 9:21
Tom McCollum (26 saves / 30 shots)		Goalie stats	Mike Murphy (25 saves / 30 shots)

Brampton wins series 4 – 2

==== Western conference ====
===== (1) Windsor Spitfires vs. (2) London Knights =====
April 15	Windsor Spitfires	4 – 3	OT	London Knights	WFCU Centre
No scoring		First period		No scoring
3:54 - pp - Scott Timmins (3)		Second period		Nazem Kadri (9) - sh - 3:40; Justin Taylor (4) - pp - 7:19; John Carlson (3) - 13:30
9:11 - pp - Ryan Ellis (7); 10:10 - pp - Andrei Loktionov (5)		Third period		No scoring
4:30 - pp - Ryan Ellis (8)		First overtime period		No scoring
Andrew Engelage (31 saves / 34 shots)		Goalie stats		Trevor Cann (30 saves / 34 shots)

April 17	London Knights	6 – 5	OT	Windsor Spitfires	John Labatt Centre
John Carlson (4) - pp - 12:33		First period		4:51 - pp - Scott Timmins (4); 5:47 - Eric Wellwood (6)
John Carlson (5) - pp - 7:57; Philip McRae (5) - 16:41; John Tavares (7) - 18:33		Second period		9:01 - Taylor Hall (10); 13:38 - pp - Rob Kwiet (5); 18:17 - Greg Nemisz (7)
John Tavares (8) - pp - 6:07		Third period		No scoring
Phil Varone (9) - 2:25		First overtime period		No scoring
Trevor Cann (27 saves / 32 shots)		Goalie stats		Andrew Engelage (38 saves / 44 shots)

April 19	Windsor Spitfires	5 – 4	OT	London Knights	WFCU Centre
Scott Timmins (5) - 4:40		First period		17:04 - pp - John Tavares (9)
Conor O'Donnell (1) - 18:16		Second period		No scoring
Adam Henrique (7) - 14:11; Ben Shutron (1) - 18:09		Third period		4:02 - Dominic DeSando (2); 4:31 - Phil Varone (10); 12:41 - Justin Taylor (5)
Eric Wellwood (7) - 8:52		First overtime period		No scoring
Andrew Engelage (27 saves / 31 shots)		Goalie stats		Trevor Cann (35 saves / 40 shots)

April 20	London Knights	4 – 5	OT	Windsor Spitfires	John Labatt Centre
4:51 - sh - Justin Taylor (6)		First period		Dale Mitchell (12) - 4:02; Lane MacDermid (2) - 6:42
No scoring		Second period		Greg Nemisz (8) - pp - 2:23; Eric Wellwood (8) - 15:53
4:35 - John Carlson (6); 14:28 - Michael Del Zotto (3); 15:55 - John Carlson (7)		Third period		No scoring
No scoring		First overtime period		Andrei Loktionov (6) - 0:59
Trevor Cann (25 saves / 30 shots)		Goalie stats		Andrew Engelage (39 saves / 43 shots)

April 22	Windsor Spitfires	4 – 3	OT	London Knights	WFCU Centre
No scoring		First period		John Tavares (10) - pp - 19:12
12:03 - pp - Taylor Hall (11); 12:38 - Lane MacDermid (3)		Second period		Leigh Salters (2) - pp - 0:24; Zac Rinaldo (1) - 16:30
9:00 - Harry Young (1)		Third period		No scoring
10:14 - Eric Wellwood (9)		First overtime period		No scoring
Andrew Engelage (41 saves / 44 shots)		Goalie stats		Trevor Cann (49 saves / 53 shots)

Windsor wins series 4 – 1

=== J. Ross Robertson Cup ===
==== (W1) Windsor Spitfires vs. (E2) Brampton Battalion ====
April 29	Windsor Spitfires	10 – 1	Brampton Battalion	WFCU Centre
6:22 - Andrei Loktionov (7); 17:12 - Andrei Loktionov (8); 19:16 - pp - Taylor Hall (12); 19:33 - Adam Henrique (8)		First period	Josh Day (2) - pp - 11:48
9:24 - Lane MacDermid (4); 17:03 - Eric Wellwood (10)		Second period	No scoring
1:20 - Justin Shugg (3); 7:35 - Conor O'Donnell (2); 12:04 - pp - Justin Shugg (4); 16:45 - pp - Justin Shugg (5)		Third period	No scoring
Andrew Engelage (22 saves / 23 shots)		Goalie stats	Tom McCollum (19 saves / 25 shots); Patrick Killeen (15 saves / 19 shots)

May 1	Brampton Battalion	3 – 5	Windsor Spitfires	Powerade Centre
No scoring		First period	10:51 - Dale Mitchell (13); 18:15 - sh - Mark Cundari (1); 18:40 - Ben Shutron (2)
Jason Dale (3) - 4:00; Matt Kang (6) - 14:30		Second period	13:50 - Andrei Loktionov (9)
Matt Kang (7) - 7:41		Third period	19:23 - en - Taylor Hall (13)
Tom McCollum (37 saves / 41 shots)		Goalie stats	Andrew Engelage (25 saves / 28 shots)

May 4	Windsor Spitfires	2 – 4	Brampton Battalion	WFCU Centre
No scoring		First period	2:23 - Anthony Peluso (8); 10:35 - Cody Hodgson (10)
Taylor Hall (14) - 17:56		Second period	12:24 - Matt Duchene (14); 15:57 - Jason Dale (4)
Taylor Hall (15) - 9:48		Third period	No scoring
Andrew Engelage (25 saves / 29 shots)		Goalie stats	Tom McCollum (32 saves / 34 shots)

May 6	Brampton Battalion	1 – 4	Windsor Spitfires	Powerade Centre
No scoring		First period	Ben Shutron (3) - 9:17
18:21 - Cody Hodgson (11)		Second period	Scott Timmins (6) - 15:45
No scoring		Third period	Andrei Loktionov (10) - 7:04; Andrei Loktionov (11) - 12:56
Tom McCollum (32 saves / 36 shots); Patrick Killeen (2 saves / 2 shots)		Goalie stats	Andrew Engelage (40 saves / 41 shots)

May 8	Windsor Spitfires	2 – 1	OT	Brampton Battalion	WFCU Centre
No scoring		First period		No scoring
13:06 - pp - Dale Mitchell (14)		Second period		No scoring
No scoring		Third period		Matt Kang (8) - 16:14
2:09 - pp - Taylor Hall (16)		First overtime period		No scoring
Andrew Engelage (37 saves / 38 shots)		Goalie stats		Tom McCollum (34 saves / 36 shots)

Windsor wins series 4 – 1

=== J. Ross Robertson Cup Champions Roster ===
2008-09 Windsor Spitfires
Goaltenders: (Canada) 1 – Andrew Engelage; (United States) 30 – Josh Unice; (Canada) 34 – Steve Gleeson	Defencemen: (Canada) 5 – Ron Soucie; (Canada) 6 – Ryan Ellis; (Canada) 7 – Adam Wallace; (Canada) 13 – Rob Kwiet; (Canada) 17 – Jesse Blacker; (Canada) 42 – Ben Shutron; (Canada) 51 – Mark Cundari; (Canada) 55 – Harry Young – C; (United States) 81 – Patrick Moran	Wingers: (Canada) 4 – Taylor Hall; (Canada) 19 – Lane MacDermid; (Canada) 22 – Richard Greenop; (Canada) 25 – James Woodcroft; (Canada) 27 – Tyson Isaac; (Canada) 29 – Conor O'Donnell; (Canada) 44 – Justin Shugg; (United States) 61 – Austin Watson; (Canada) 64 – Greg Nemisz – A; (Canada) 67 – Eric Wellwood; (Canada) 71 – Dale Mitchell – A	Centres: (Canada) 14 – Adam Henrique – A; (Canada) 16 – Ben Dubois; (Canada) 77 – Scott Timmins; (Russia) 90 – Andrei Loktionov; Coach: (Canada) Bob Boughner; General Manager: (Canada) Warren Rychel

=== Playoff scoring leaders ===
Note: GP = Games played; G = Goals; A = Assists; Pts = Points; PIM = Penalty minutes

Player	Team	GP	G	A	Pts	PIM
Taylor Hall	Windsor Spitfires	20	16	20	36	12
Andrei Loktionov	Windsor Spitfires	20	11	22	33	2
Cody Hodgson	Brampton Battalion	21	11	20	31	18
Ryan Ellis	Windsor Spitfires	20	8	23	31	20
Dale Mitchell	Windsor Spitfires	20	14	15	29	24
Matt Duchene	Brampton Battalion	14	12	26	21	
Evgeny Grachev	Brampton Battalion	19	11	14	25	4
John Carlson	London Knights	14	7	15	22	16
John Tavares	London Knights	14	10	11	21	8
Eric Wellwood	Windsor Spitfires	20	10	11	21	12
Nazem Kadri	London Knights	14	9	12	21	22
Eric Tangradi	Belleville Bulls	16	8	13	21	12

=== Playoff leading goaltenders ===
Note: GP = Games played; Mins = Minutes played; W = Wins; L = Losses: OTL = Overtime losses; GA = Goals Allowed; SO = Shutouts; GAA = Goals against average

Player	Team	GP	Mins	W	L	GA	SO	Sv%	GAA
J. P. Anderson	Mississauga St. Michael's Majors	11	697	6	5	29	0	0.928	2.50
Mike Murphy	Belleville Bulls	17	1007	10	7	43	0	0.916	2.56
Andrew Loverock	Sudbury Wolves	6	360	2	4	16	0	0.929	2.67
Trevor Cann	London Knights	13	805	9	4	38	0	0.912	2.83
Andrew Engelage	Windsor Spitfires	20	1112	14	3	53	0	0.908	2.86

== All-Star teams ==
=== First team ===
- Cody Hodgson, Centre, Brampton Battalion
- Taylor Hall, Left Wing, Windsor Spitfires
- Bryan Cameron, Right Wing, Belleville Bulls
- Ryan Ellis, Defence, Windsor Spitfires
- P. K. Subban, Defence, Belleville Bulls
- Mike Murphy, Goaltender, Belleville Bulls
- Bob Boughner, Coach, Windsor Spitfires

=== Second team ===
- John Tavares, Centre, London Knights
- Justin DiBenedetto, Left Wing, Sarnia Sting
- Greg Nemisz, Right Wing, Windsor Spitfires
- Cameron Gaunce, Defence, Belleville Bulls
- John Carlson, Defence, London Knights
- Thomas McCollum, Goaltender, Brampton Battalion
- George Burnett, Coach, Belleville Bulls

=== Third team ===
- Chris Terry, Centre, Plymouth Whalers
- Evgeny Grachev, Left Wing, Brampton Battalion
- Matt Kennedy, Right Wing, Guelph Storm
- Alex Pietrangelo, Defence, Niagara IceDogs
- Michael Del Zotto, Defence, London Knights
- Edward Pasquale, Goaltender, Saginaw Spirit
- Mike Vellucci, Coach, Plymouth Whalers

== All-Star Classic ==
The 2009 Subway OHL All-Star Classic was played February 4, 2009 at the WFCU Centre in Windsor, won 11–6 by the Eastern Conference. Cody Hodgson of the Brampton Battalion won the player of the game award, as he scored three goals and added two assists. The skills competition was held the previous night on February 3, with the Western Conference winning. Honorary captains for the event were former Peterborough Petes player Steve Yzerman for the Eastern Conference, while former Windsor Spitfires player Adam Graves represented the Western Conference.

== Awards ==
J. Ross Robertson Cup:	Windsor Spitfires
Hamilton Spectator Trophy:	Windsor Spitfires
Bobby Orr Trophy:	Brampton Battalion
Wayne Gretzky Trophy:	Windsor Spitfires
Emms Trophy:	Brampton Battalion
Leyden Trophy:	Belleville Bulls
Holody Trophy:	London Knights
Bumbacco Trophy:	Windsor Spitfires
Red Tilson Trophy:	Cody Hodgson, Brampton Battalion
Eddie Powers Memorial Trophy:	John Tavares, London Knights
Matt Leyden Trophy:	Bob Boughner, Windsor Spitfires
Jim Mahon Memorial Trophy:	Justin DiBenedetto, Sarnia Sting
Max Kaminsky Trophy:	Ryan Ellis, Windsor Spitfires
OHL Goaltender of the Year:	Mike Murphy, Belleville Bulls
Jack Ferguson Award:	Daniel Catenacci, Sault Ste. Marie Greyhounds
Dave Pinkney Trophy:	Mike Murphy, Belleville Bulls
OHL Executive of the Year:	Warren Rychel, Windsor Spitfires
Emms Family Award:	Evgeny Grachev, Brampton Battalion
F. W. "Dinty" Moore Trophy:	J. P. Anderson, Mississauga St. Michael's Majors
Dan Snyder Memorial Trophy:	Chris Terry, Plymouth Whalers
William Hanley Trophy:	Cody Hodgson, Brampton Battalion
Leo Lalonde Memorial Trophy:	Justin DiBenedetto, Sarnia Sting
Bobby Smith Trophy:	Matt Duchene, Brampton Battalion
Roger Neilson Memorial Award:	Tim Priamo, Guelph Storm
Ivan Tennant Memorial Award:	Freddie Hamilton, Niagara IceDogs
Mickey Renaud Captain's Trophy:	Chris Terry, Plymouth Whalers
Tim Adams Memorial Trophy:	Lucas Lessio, Toronto Marlboros
Bill Long Award:	Bert O'Brien, Ottawa 67's & Sam Sisco, Ontario Hockey League
Wayne Gretzky 99 Award:	Taylor Hall, Windsor Spitfires

== 2009 OHL Priority Selection ==
On May 2, 2009, the OHL conducted the 2009 Ontario Hockey League Priority Selection. The Sault Ste. Marie Greyhounds held the first overall pick in the draft, and selected Daniel Catenacci from the York-Simcoe Express. Catenacci was awarded the Jack Ferguson Award, awarded to the top pick in the draft.

Below are the players who were selected in the first round of the 2009 Ontario Hockey League Priority Selection.

#	Player	Nationality	OHL team	Hometown	Minor team
1	Daniel Catenacci (LW)	Canada	Sault Ste. Marie Greyhounds	Newmarket, Ontario	York-Simcoe Express
2	Alan Quine (C)	Canada	Kingston Frontenacs	Orleans, Ontario	Toronto Jr. Canadiens
3	Ryan Murphy (D)	Canada	Kitchener Rangers	Aurora, Ontario	York-Simcoe Express
4	Boone Jenner (LW)	Canada	Oshawa Generals	Dorchester, Ontario	Elgin-Middlesex Chiefs
5	Justin Sefton (D)	Canada	Sudbury Wolves	Thunder Bay, Ontario	Notre Dame Hounds
6	Matt Puempel (LW)	Canada	Peterborough Petes	Essex, Ontario	Sun County Panthers
7	Lucas Lessio (LW)	Canada	Niagara IceDogs	Maple, Ontario	Toronto Marlboros
8	Ryan Strome (C)	Canada	Barrie Colts	Mississauga, Ontario	Toronto Marlboros
9	Curtis Crombeen (D)	Canada	Owen Sound Attack	Sarnia, Ontario	Lambton Jr. Sting
10	David Broll (LW)	Canada	Erie Otters	Mississauga, Ontario	Toronto Nationals
11	Carter Sandlak (LW)	Canada	Guelph Storm	London, Ontario	London Jr. Knights
12	Brett Ritchie (RW)	Canada	Sarnia Sting	Orangeville, Ontario	Toronto Marlboros
13	Garrett Meurs (C)	Canada	Plymouth Whalers	Ripley, Ontario	Huron Perth Lakers
14	Anthony Camara (LW)	Canada	Saginaw Spirit	Toronto, Ontario	Mississauga Senators
15	Stuart Percy (D)	Canada	Mississauga St. Michael's Majors	Oakville, Ontario	Toronto Marlboros
16	Cody Ceci (D)	Canada	Ottawa 67's	Orleans, Ontario	Peterborough Jr. Petes
17	Barclay Goodrow (RW)	Canada	Brampton Battalion	Aurora, Ontario	York-Simcoe Express
18	Tyson Teichmann (G)	Canada	Belleville Bulls	Belleville, Ontario	Quinte Red Devils
19	Scott Harrington (D)	Canada	London Knights	Kingston, Ontario	Kingston Jr. Frontenacs
20	Austen Brassard (RW)	Canada	Windsor Spitfires	Windsor, Ontario	Windsor AAA Zone

== 2009 CHL Import Draft ==
On June 30, 2009, the Canadian Hockey League conducted the 2009 CHL Import Draft, in which teams in all three CHL leagues participate in. The Plymouth Whalers held the first pick in the draft by a team in the OHL, and selected Gabriel Landeskog from Sweden with their selection.

Below are the players who were selected in the first round by Ontario Hockey League teams in the 2009 CHL Import Draft.

#	Player	Nationality	OHL team	Hometown	Minor team
3	Gabriel Landeskog (RW)	Sweden	Plymouth Whalers	Stockholm, Sweden	Djurgården IF Jr.
6	Tomas Tatar (LW)	Slovakia	Kitchener Rangers	Trenčín, Slovakia	Zvolen HKM
9	Robin Lehner (G)	Sweden	Sault Ste. Marie Greyhounds	Gothenburg, Sweden	Västra Frölunda HC Jr.
12	Alexander Burmistrov (C)	Russia	Barrie Colts	Kazan, Russia	Kazan AK Bars-2
15	Roman Berdnikov (RW)	Russia	Owen Sound Attack	Omsk, Russia	Omsk Avangard-VDV
18	Jiri Sekac (LW)	Czech Republic	Peterborough Petes	Kladno, Czech Republic	Kladno Jr. B
21	Petteri Simila (G)	Finland	Niagara IceDogs	Oulu, Finland	Karpat Oulu Jr.
24	Tom Kuhnhackl (LW)	Germany	Windsor Spitfires	Landshut, Germany	Landshut EV Jr.
27	Alain Berger (RW)	Switzerland	Oshawa Generals	Burgsdorf, Switzerland	Bern SCB Eishockey AG
30	Petr Mrazek (G)	Czech Republic	Ottawa 67's	Vitkovice, Czech Republic	Vitkovice Ostrave Jr. B
33	Tadeas Galansky (G)	Czech Republic	Saginaw Spirit	Brno, Czech Republic	Havirov Jr. B
36	Ramis Sadikov (G)	Russia	Erie Otters	Moscow, Russia	Russia
39	Stefan Stepanov (D)	Russia	Sudbury Wolves	Moscow, Russia	Moscow Krylia Sovetov
42	Ivan Telegin (C/LW)	Russia	Saginaw Spirit	Novokuznetsk, Russia	Novokuznetsk Metallurg-2
45	Patrik Andersson (D)	Sweden	Kitchener Rangers	Norrtälje, Sweden	Brynäs IF Jr.
48	Matias Sointu (RW)	Finland	Ottawa 67's	Tampere, Finland	Ilves Tampere Jr.
51	Valery Knyazev (LW)	Czech Republic	Brampton Battalion	Prague, Czech Republic	Sparta Praha Jr. B
54	Eddy Rinke-Leitans (RW)	Latvia	Sudbury Wolves	Riga, Latvia	Iserlohn EC Jr.
56	No selection made		Sudbury Wolves		
58	Anton Klementyev (D)	Russia	London Knights	Togliatti, Russia	Yaroslavl Lokomotiv-2

== 2009 NHL entry draft ==
On June 26–27, 2009, the National Hockey League conducted the 2009 NHL entry draft held at the Bell Centre in Montreal, Quebec. In total, 45 players from the Ontario Hockey League were selected in the draft. John Tavares of the London Knights was the first player from the OHL to be selected, as he was taken with the first overall pick by the New York Islanders.

Below are the players selected from OHL teams at the NHL Entry Draft.

Round	#	Player	Nationality	NHL team	Hometown	OHL team
1	1	John Tavares (C)	Canada	New York Islanders	Oakville, Ontario	London Knights
1	3	Matt Duchene (C)	Canada	Colorado Avalanche	Haliburton, Ontario	Brampton Battalion
1	7	Nazem Kadri (C)	Canada	Toronto Maple Leafs	London, Ontario	London Knights
1	11	Ryan Ellis (D)	Canada	Nashville Predators	Freelton, Ontario	Windsor Spitfires
1	12	Calvin de Haan (D)	Canada	New York Islanders	Carp, Ontario	Oshawa Generals
1	13	Zack Kassian (RW)	Canada	Buffalo Sabres	LaSalle, Ontario	Peterborough Petes
1	15	Peter Holland (C)	Canada	Anaheim Ducks	Caledon, Ontario	Guelph Storm
2	33	Ryan O'Reilly (C)	Canada	Colorado Avalanche	Varna, Ontario	Erie Otters
2	35	Kyle Clifford (LW)	Canada	Los Angeles Kings	Ayr, Ontario	Barrie Colts
2	37	Mat Clark (D)	Canada	Anaheim Ducks	Campbellville, Ontario	Brampton Battalion
2	47	Ethan Werek (C)	Canada	New York Rangers	Goodwood, Ontario	Kingston Frontenacs
2	57	Taylor Doherty (D)	Canada	San Jose Sharks	Cambridge, Ontario	Kingston Frontenacs
2	58	Jesse Blacker (D)	Canada	Toronto Maple Leafs	Toronto, Ontario	Windsor Spitfires
3	68	Jamie Devane (LW)	Canada	Toronto Maple Leafs	Toronto, Ontario	Plymouth Whalers
3	70	Taylor Beck (RW)	Canada	Nashville Predators	Niagara Falls, Ontario	Guelph Storm
3	72	Michael Latta (C)	Canada	Nashville Predators	St. Clements, Ontario	Guelph Storm
3	77	Matt Hackett (G)	Canada	Minnesota Wild	London, Ontario	Plymouth Whalers
4	92	Casey Cizikas (C)	Canada	New York Islanders	Mississauga, Ontario	Mississauga St. Michael's Majors
4	93	Alex Hutchings (C)	Canada	Tampa Bay Lightning	Burlington, Ontario	Barrie Colts
4	97	Jordan Szwarz (RW)	Canada	Phoenix Coyotes	Burlington, Ontario	Saginaw Spirit
4	104	Marcus Foligno (LW)	Canada	Buffalo Sabres	Sudbury, Ontario	Sudbury Wolves
4	107	Garrett Wilson (LW)	Canada	Florida Panthers	Elmvale, Ontario	Owen Sound Attack
4	112	Lane MacDermid (LW)	Canada	Boston Bruins	Sauble Beach, Ontario	Windsor Spitfires
4	117	Edward Pasquale (G)	Canada	Atlanta Thrashers	Toronto, Ontario	Saginaw Spirit
4	120	Ben Chiarot (D)	Canada	Atlanta Thrashers	Hamilton, Ontario	Guelph Storm
5	125	Cody Sol (D)	Canada	Atlanta Thrashers	Woodstock, Ontario	Saginaw Spirit
5	126	David Kolomatis (D)	United States	Los Angeles Kings	Basking Ridge, New Jersey	Owen Sound Attack
5	131	Matt Kennedy (RW)	Canada	Carolina Hurricanes	Shanty Bay, Ontario	Guelph Storm
5	140	Scott Stajcer (G)	Canada	New York Rangers	Cambridge, Ontario	Owen Sound Attack
5	145	Brett Flemming (D)	Canada	Washington Capitals	Burlington, Ontario	Mississauga St. Michael's Majors
5	147	Phil Varone (C)	Canada	San Jose Sharks	Vaughan, Ontario	London Knights
5	148	Michael Zador (G)	Canada	Tampa Bay Lightning	Toronto, Ontario	Oshawa Generals
5	151	Andy Bathgate (C)	Canada	Pittsburgh Penguins	Brampton, Ontario	Belleville Bulls
6	156	Michael Pelech (C)	Canada	Los Angeles Kings	Toronto, Ontario	Mississauga St. Michael's Majors
6	160	Corey Cowick (LW)	Canada	Ottawa Senators	Gloucester, Ontario	Ottawa 67's
6	162	Jaroslav Janus (G)	Slovakia	Tampa Bay Lightning	Prešov, Slovakia	Erie Otters
6	165	Scott Timmins (C)	Canada	Florida Panthers	Hamilton, Ontario	Windsor Spitfires
6	168	David Shields (D)	United States	St. Louis Blues	Rochester, New York	Erie Otters
6	170	Daniel Maggio (D)	Canada	New York Rangers	LaSalle, Ontario	Sudbury Wolves
6	172	Eric Wellwood (LW)	Canada	Philadelphia Flyers	Oldcastle, Ontario	Windsor Spitfires
6	176	Tyler Randell (RW)	Canada	Boston Bruins	Brampton, Ontario	Kitchener Rangers
7	186	Jordan Nolan (LW)	Canada	Los Angeles Kings	Garden River, Ontario	Sault Ste. Marie Greyhounds
7	188	Barron Smith (D)	United States	Toronto Maple Leafs	Hinsdale, Illinois	Peterborough Petes
7	197	Kyle Neuber (RW)	Canada	Columbus Blue Jackets	Sarnia, Ontario	Mississauga St. Michael's Majors

== See also ==
- 2009 Memorial Cup
- List of OHL seasons
- 2008–09 QMJHL season
- 2008–09 WHL season
- 2008 NHL entry draft
- List of OHA Junior A standings
- 2008 in ice hockey
- 2009 in ice hockey

Preceded by 2007–08 OHL season	OHL seasons	Succeeded by 2009–10 OHL season
