= Alex Hutchings (ice hockey) =

Canadian ice hockey player

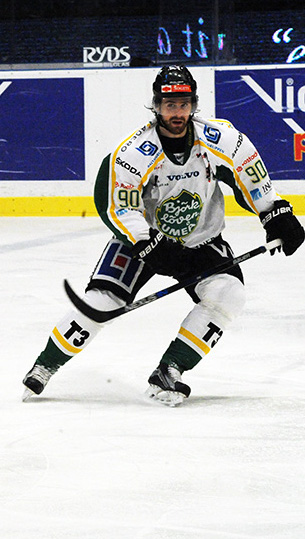
- Hutchings with IF Björklöven in 2015
- Born: November 7, 1990 (age 35) Burlington, Ontario, Canada
- Height: 5 ft 11 in (180 cm)
- Weight: 179 lb (81 kg; 12 st 11 lb)
- Position: Forward
- Shot: Right
- Played for: Norfolk Admirals; Syracuse Crunch; Rochester Americans; ETC Crimmitschau; IK Oskarshamn; IF Björklöven
- NHL draft: 93rd overall, 2009; Tampa Bay Lightning
- Playing career: 2010–2023

Alex Hutchings (born November 7, 1990) is a Canadian former professional ice hockey player. He was selected by the Tampa Bay Lightning in the 4th round (93rd overall) of the 2009 NHL entry draft.

== Playing career ==
Hutchings played as a junior in the Ontario Hockey League (OHL) with the Barrie Colts before his selection by the Lightning in the 2009 NHL entry draft.

On September 10, 2010, Hutchings was signed to a three-year, entry-level contract with the Tampa Bay Lightning. Unable to make an impact within the Lightning's affiliates, Hutchings failed to receive a qualifying offer following the conclusion of his rookie deal.

Prior to the 2013–14 season, Hutchings signed a try-out contract to continue in the American Hockey League with the Rochester Americans. He would participate with Rochester in the 2013 Spengler Cup, scoring 1 goal.

On September 11, 2014, Hutchings signed his first contract abroad on a one-year deal with ETC Crimmitschau of the DEL2.

In the 2018–19 season, Hutchings continued to play in the HockeyAllsvenskan with IK Oskarshamn. He enjoyed his most successful season in Sweden, notching 39 points in 52 games and later helped Oskarshamn gain promotion to the top tier SHL. He left the club at the conclusion of his contract as a free agent.

== Career statistics ==
			Regular season					Playoffs
Season	Team	League	GP	G	A	Pts	PIM	GP	G	A	Pts	PIM
2005–06	Burlington Eagles	OHA	70	65	35	100	76	—	—	—	—	—
2006–07	Barrie Colts	OHL	30	1	4	5	24	—	—	—	—	—
2007–08	Barrie Colts	OHL	68	29	25	54	48	9	0	5	5	18
2008–09	Barrie Colts	OHL	63	34	34	68	60	5	3	4	7	6
2009–10	Barrie Colts	OHL	68	47	34	81	58	13	2	8	10	12
2010–11	Norfolk Admirals	AHL	1	0	0	0	0	1	0	0	0	2
2010–11	Florida Everblades	ECHL	51	13	13	26	41	4	1	2	3	6
2011–12	Florida Everblades	ECHL	23	12	12	24	24	—	—	—	—	—
2011–12	Norfolk Admirals	AHL	12	2	3	5	0	—	—	—	—	—
2012–13	Florida Everblades	ECHL	40	14	20	34	30	—	—	—	—	—
2012–13	Syracuse Crunch	AHL	24	3	3	6	10	—	—	—	—	—
2013–14	Rochester Americans	AHL	51	5	3	8	31	3	0	1	1	2
2014–15	Eispiraten Crimmitschau	DEL2	50	22	40	62	54	—	—	—	—	—
2015–16	IF Björklöven	Allsv	51	22	10	32	28	—	—	—	—	—
2016–17	EHC Winterthur	NLB	34	21	12	33	36	—	—	—	—	—
2016–17	SC Rapperswil-Jona Lakers	NLB	—	—	—	—	—	1	0	1	1	4
2017–18	IF Björklöven	Allsv	33	11	12	23	16	5	1	2	3	0
2018–19	IK Oskarshamn	Allsv	52	15	24	39	73	8	1	1	2	27
2019–20	IF Björklöven	Allsv	51	19	29	48	50	2	1	2	3	6
2020–21	IF Björklöven	Allsv	50	16	23	39	55	16	8	4	12	14
2021–22	IF Björklöven	Allsv	46	13	17	30	34	18	6	7	13	28
2022–23	IF Björklöven	Allsv	52	12	18	30	58	9	1	2	3	16
2023–24	Wentworth Gryphins	ACH	15	19	25	44	0	9	2	9	11	10
2024–25	Wentworth Gryphins	ACH	9	11	11	22	2	2	2	0	2	6
AHL totals			88	10	9	19	41	3	0	1	1	2

== Awards and honours ==
Award	Year
OHL
CHL Top Prospects Game	2009
All-Star Game	2009, 2010
