= David Shields (ice hockey) =

American ice hockey player

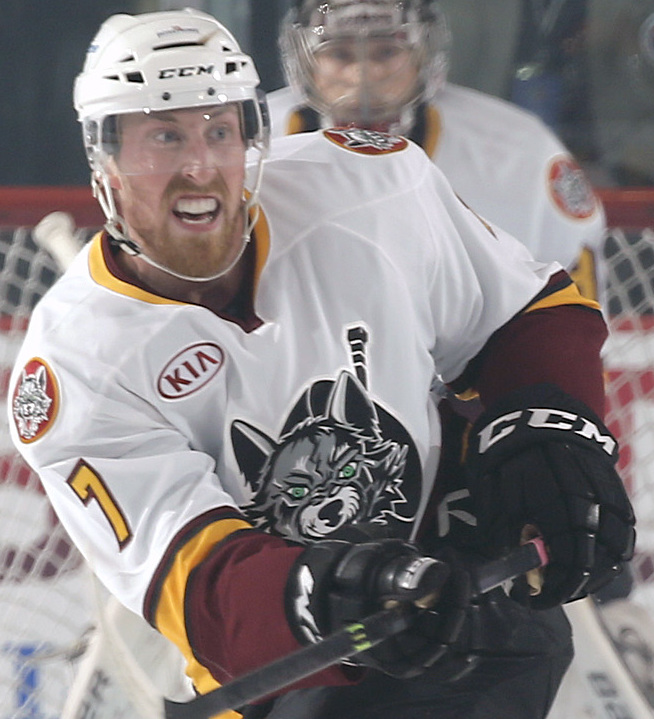
- Shields with the Chicago Wolves in 2014
- Born: January 27, 1991 (age 35) Rochester, New York, U.S.
- Height: 6 ft 3 in (191 cm)
- Weight: 216 lb (98 kg; 15 st 6 lb)
- Position: Defense
- Shot: Right
- Played for: Peoria Rivermen; Chicago Wolves; Utica Comets; EC VSV
- NHL draft: 168th overall, 2009; St. Louis Blues
- Playing career: 2011–2018

David Shields (born January 27, 1991) is an American former professional ice hockey defenseman. He last played with the EC VSV of the Austrian Hockey League (EBEL). Shields was selected by the St. Louis Blues in the 6th round (168th overall) of the 2009 NHL entry draft.

== Playing career ==
Before turning professional, Shields played four seasons (2007–2011) of major junior hockey in the Ontario Hockey League with the Erie Otters.

On March 23, 2011, the St. Louis Blues signed Shields to an entry-level contract and he began the 2011–12 season in the AHL with the Peoria Rivermen.

After his entry-level contract, Shields was re-signed to a one-year, two-way extension to remain within the Blues organization on July 9, 2014.

As a free agent after four professional seasons with the Blues' affiliates, Shields signed a one-year ECHL contract with the Adirondack Thunder on September 28, 2015. He attended the Albany Devils training camp on an invite, however was released to begin the 2015–16 season for the Thunder's inaugural campaign. On December 10, 2015, Shields was signed to a professional try-out with the Utica Comets of the AHL. Having made an impression upon the Comets, he remained with the club for the remainder of the campaign, featuring in 32 games and providing 10 points.

On July 11, 2016, Shields accepted a contract as a free agent to continue with the Utica Comets, agreeing to a one-year deal.

On July 13, 2017, Shields left the AHL as a free agent and signed a one-year contract with the EC VSV of the EBEL.

== Career statistics ==
			Regular season					Playoffs
Season	Team	League	GP	G	A	Pts	PIM	GP	G	A	Pts	PIM
2006–07	Maksymum Jr. Hockey	EmJHL	37	4	16	20	60	—	—	—	—	—
2007–08	Erie Otters	OHL	60	1	3	4	31	—	—	—	—	—
2008–09	Erie Otters	OHL	61	1	16	17	28	5	0	0	0	5
2009–10	Erie Otters	OHL	68	7	12	19	42	4	0	0	0	12
2010–11	Erie Otters	OHL	61	6	21	27	48	7	1	4	5	4
2011–12	Peoria Rivermen	AHL	48	0	4	4	10	—	—	—	—	—
2011–12	Alaska Aces	ECHL	12	1	5	6	2	3	0	2	2	0
2012–13	Peoria Rivermen	AHL	59	0	5	5	41	—	—	—	—	—
2013–14	Chicago Wolves	AHL	55	5	10	15	21	3	0	0	0	2
2014–15	Chicago Wolves	AHL	42	0	6	6	10	—	—	—	—	—
2015–16	Adirondack Thunder	ECHL	15	2	7	9	9	—	—	—	—	—
2015–16	Utica Comets	AHL	32	3	7	10	8	3	0	1	1	0
2016–17	Utica Comets	AHL	48	0	10	10	8	—	—	—	—	—
2017–18	EC VSV	EBEL	55	2	13	15	32	—	—	—	—	—
AHL totals			284	8	42	50	98	6	0	1	1	2
