= Jared Gomes (ice hockey) =

Canadian ice hockey player (born 1988)

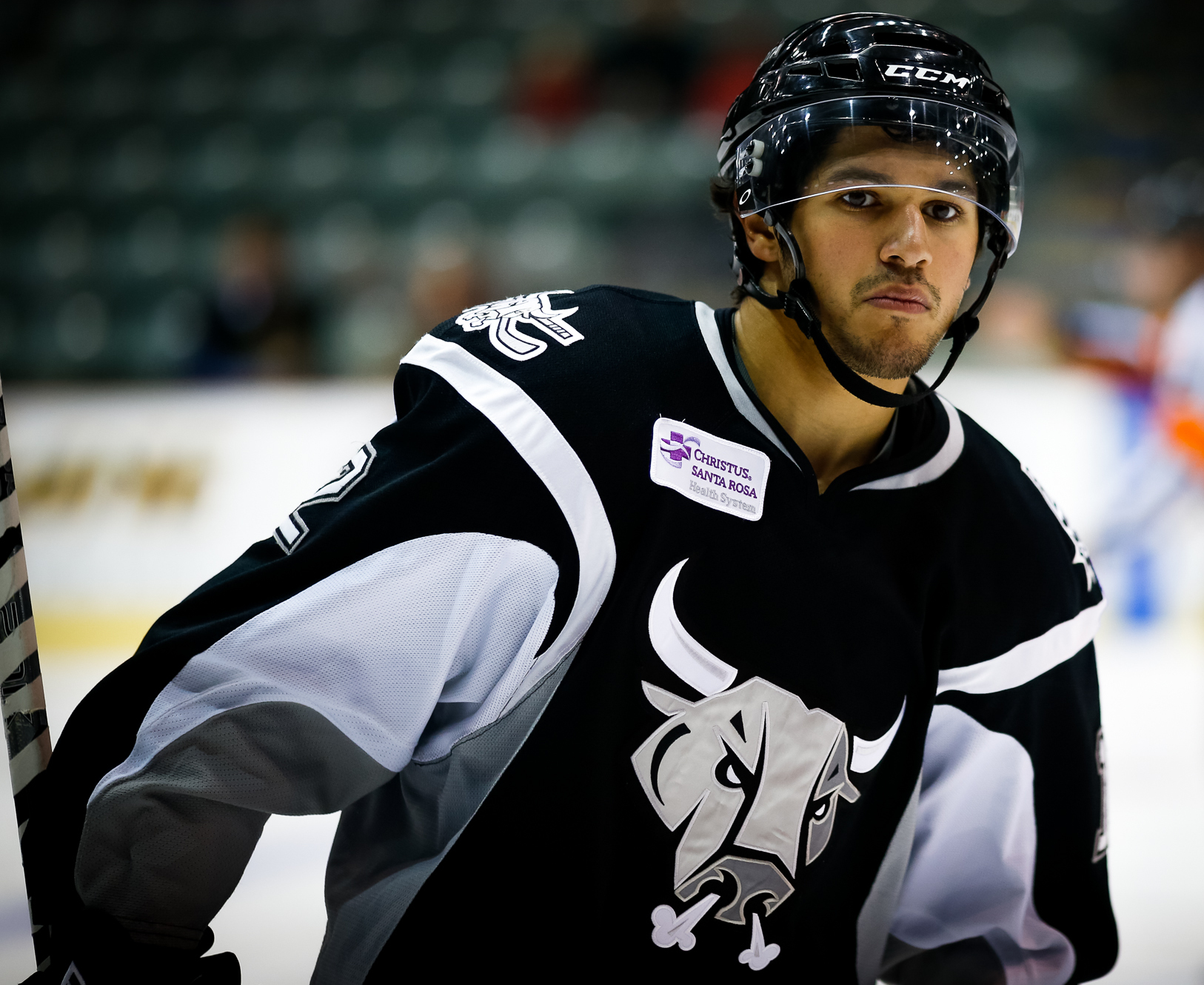
- Gomes with the San Antonio Rampage in 2013
- Born: October 20, 1988 (age 37) Brampton, Ontario, Canada
- Height: 6 ft 1 in (185 cm)
- Weight: 190 lb (86 kg; 13 st 8 lb)
- Position: Centre
- Shot: Left
- Played for: San Antonio Rampage; Straubing Tigers; Bridgeport Sound Tigers; EHC Winterthur; Brampton Beast; SC Riessersee; EC Bad Nauheim; Ravensburg Towerstars
- NHL draft: Undrafted
- Playing career: 2012–2020

Jared Gomes (born October 20, 1988) is a Canadian former professional ice hockey player.

== Playing career ==
Gomes attended the University of Prince Edward Island where he played in the Atlantic conference of Canadian Interuniversity Sport (CIS). For his outstanding play during the 2009–10 season, Gomes was selected as the 2009–10 CIS Rookie of the Year and was awarded the Clare Drake Award. He was also named to the 2011–12 AUS First All-Star Team. Gomes spent the 2013–14 season with the American Hockey League's San Antonio Rampage.

On October 11, 2014, Gomes signed a professional tryout contract with the Hamilton Bulldogs of the AHL. He was shortly released thereafter, securing his first European contract in signing a one-year deal with the Straubing Tigers of the Deutsche Eishockey Liga on October 16, 2014. In the 2014–15 season, Gomes established a role as a depth forward and contributed with 14 points in 41 games.

On June 3, 2015, Gomes opted to return to the AHL, signing a one-year contract for the 2015–16 season with the Bridgeport Sound Tigers. In 2016–17 season, he played for Italian team Ritten Sport in the Continental Cup until he changed to German second-level league team SC Riessersee in November 2016.

After completing his fifth European season in Germany, Gomes opted to return to North America during the COVID-19 pandemic, signing a contract to return to his former club, the Brampton Beast of the ECHL, on September 24, 2020. With the Beast later suspending operations due to the pandemic for the season, Gomes was released as a free agent.

== Career statistics ==
			Regular season					Playoffs
Season	Team	League	GP	G	A	Pts	PIM	GP	G	A	Pts	PIM
2004–05	Oakville Blades	OPJHL	31	8	16	24	4	—	—	—	—	—
2005–06	Sarnia Sting	OHL	66	15	17	32	32	—	—	—	—	—
2006–07	Sarnia Sting	OHL	54	10	19	29	46	4	0	0	0	2
2007–08	Sarnia Sting	OHL	68	19	10	29	47	9	3	1	4	0
2008–09	Mississauga St. Michael's Majors	OHL	68	31	31	62	40	11	5	8	13	6
2009–10	U. of Prince Edward Island	AUS	28	17	16	33	20	—	—	—	—	—
2010–11	U. of Prince Edward Island	AUS	28	10	11	21	20	—	—	—	—	—
2011–12	U. of Prince Edward Island	AUS	28	21	10	31	38	—	—	—	—	—
2012–13	San Antonio Rampage	AHL	73	16	17	33	26	—	—	—	—	—
2013–14	San Antonio Rampage	AHL	56	4	7	11	32	—	—	—	—	—
2014–15	Straubing Tigers	DEL	41	4	10	14	20	—	—	—	—	—
2015–16	Bridgeport Sound Tigers	AHL	60	8	9	17	34	3	0	0	0	0
2016–17	SC Riessersee	DEL2	15	6	10	16	8	—	—	—	—	—
2017–18	SC Riessersee	DEL2	48	7	14	21	28	18	6	4	10	4
2018–19	EHC Winterthur	SL	28	14	14	28	18	—	—	—	—	—
2019–20	Brampton Beast	ECHL	5	3	4	7	4	—	—	—	—	—
2019–20	EC Bad Nauheim	DEL2	12	4	10	14	2	—	—	—	—	—
2019–20	Ravensburg Towerstars	DEL2	15	5	5	10	14	—	—	—	—	—
AHL totals			189	28	33	61	92	3	0	0	0	0

== Awards and honours ==
Award	Year
Clare Drake Award - CIS Rookie of the Year	2009–10
AUS First Team All-Star	2011–12
