= Drew Schiestel =

Canadian ice hockey player

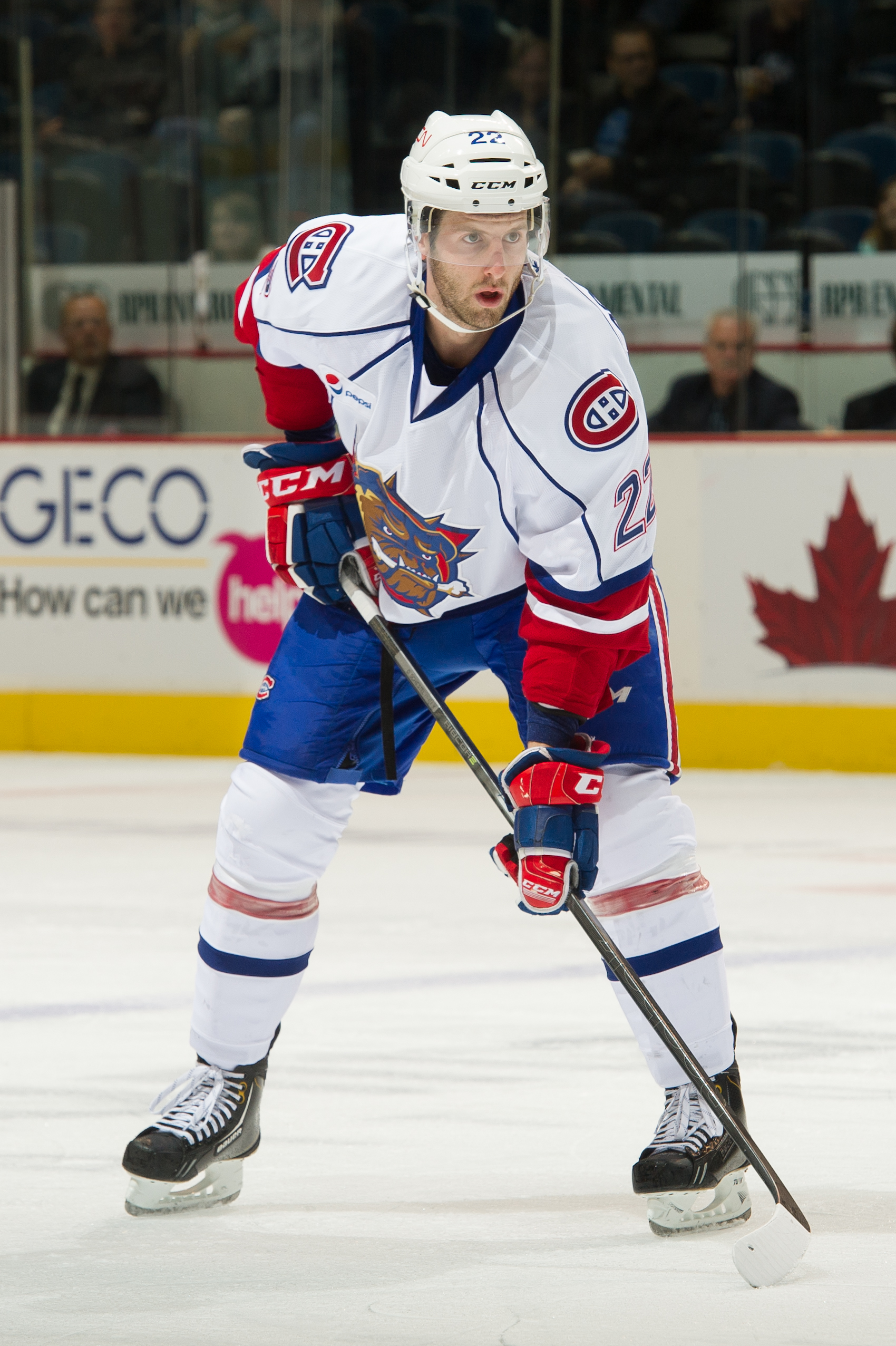
- Schiestel with the Hamilton Bulldogs in 2013
- Born: March 9, 1989 (age 37) Hamilton, Ontario, Canada
- Height: 6 ft 2 in (188 cm)
- Weight: 193 lb (88 kg; 13 st 11 lb)
- Position: Defence
- Shoots: Left
- ACH team Former teams: Hamilton Steelhawks; Portland Pirates; Rochester Americans; Texas Stars; Hamilton Bulldogs; Düsseldorfer EG; Rungsted IK; Fehérvár AV19; Lørenskog IK; KHL Medveščak Zagreb; Cardiff Devils; Coventry Blaze
- NHL draft: 59th overall, 2007; Buffalo Sabres
- Playing career: 2009–present

Drew Schiestel (born March 9, 1989) is a Canadian professional ice hockey defenceman who last played for Allan Cup Hockey (ACH) side Hamilton Steelhawks. He was previously with the Coventry Blaze in the British Elite Ice Hockey League (EIHL). Schiestel also played for fellow EIHL side Cardiff Devils.

== Playing career ==
Schiestel was originally selected by the Buffalo Sabres in the 2nd round (59th overall) of the 2007 NHL entry draft and played within the Sabres organization predominantly with AHL affiliates, the Portland Pirates and the Rochester Americans. On July 29, 2013, Schiestel signed as a free agent to a one-year AHL contract to return to his native Hamilton with the Bulldogs.

On August 30, 2014, Schiestel left North America as a free agent and signed his first contract abroad in Germany on a one-year contract with Düsseldorfer EG of the Deutsche Eishockey Liga. Schiestel continued his European career after one season in Germany, signing with Danish club Rungsted IK of the Metal Ligaen on August 21, 2015.

After two seasons in Europe, Schiestel opted to return to North America for the 2016–17 season, agreeing to terms on a one-year deal with the Indy Fuel of the ECHL on October 6, 2016. In the 2016-17 season with the Fuel, Schiestel appeared in just 14 games with 5 assists before opting to return abroad, signing a one-year deal with Hungary's Fehérvár AV19 of the Austrian Hockey League.

In November 2018, Schiestel moved to the UK to sign for the Cardiff Devils - later winning the 2018–19 play-off title with the club.

In June 2019, Schiestel moved to league counterparts, the Coventry Blaze. On September 6, 2019, Schiestel was named as the Blaze captain for the 2019-20 EIHL season.

== Career statistics ==
			Regular season					Playoffs
Season	Team	League	GP	G	A	Pts	PIM	GP	G	A	Pts	PIM
2005–06	Mississauga IceDogs	OHL	40	1	4	5	42	—	—	—	—	—
2006–07	Mississauga IceDogs	OHL	66	6	15	21	40	5	0	6	6	2
2007–08	Niagara IceDogs	OHL	68	8	29	37	40	10	1	6	7	10
2008–09	Niagara IceDogs	OHL	63	10	38	48	75	12	2	6	8	14
2009–10	Portland Pirates	AHL	52	1	11	12	19	4	0	0	0	0
2010–11	Portland Pirates	AHL	45	5	18	23	32	—	—	—	—	—
2011–12	Rochester Americans	AHL	43	2	10	12	12	—	—	—	—	—
2011–12	Texas Stars	AHL	16	0	5	5	8	—	—	—	—	—
2012–13	Rochester Americans	AHL	35	1	2	3	16	3	0	0	0	2
2012–13	Greenville Road Warriors	ECHL	3	0	0	0	0	—	—	—	—	—
2013–14	Hamilton Bulldogs	AHL	49	2	6	8	37	—	—	—	—	—
2013–14	Wheeling Nailers	ECHL	6	1	1	2	0	—	—	—	—	—
2014–15	Düsseldorfer EG	DEL	48	1	9	10	32	12	0	3	3	4
2015–16	Rungsted IK	ML	40	3	15	18	24	—	—	—	—	—
2016–17	Indy Fuel	ECHL	14	0	5	5	9	—	—	—	—	—
2016–17	Fehérvár AV19	EBEL	32	4	14	18	16	—	—	—	—	—
2017–18	Lørenskog IK	GET	31	3	16	19	22	—	—	—	—	—
2017–18	KHL Medveščak Zagreb	EBEL	5	0	2	2	2	6	1	2	3	8
2018–19	Cardiff Devils	EIHL	40	6	11	17	18	4	0	3	3	2
2019–20	Coventry Blaze	EIHL	38	2	17	19	22	—	—	—	—	—
AHL totals			240	11	52	63	124	7	0	0	0	2
