= Justin DiBenedetto =

Canadian ice hockey player

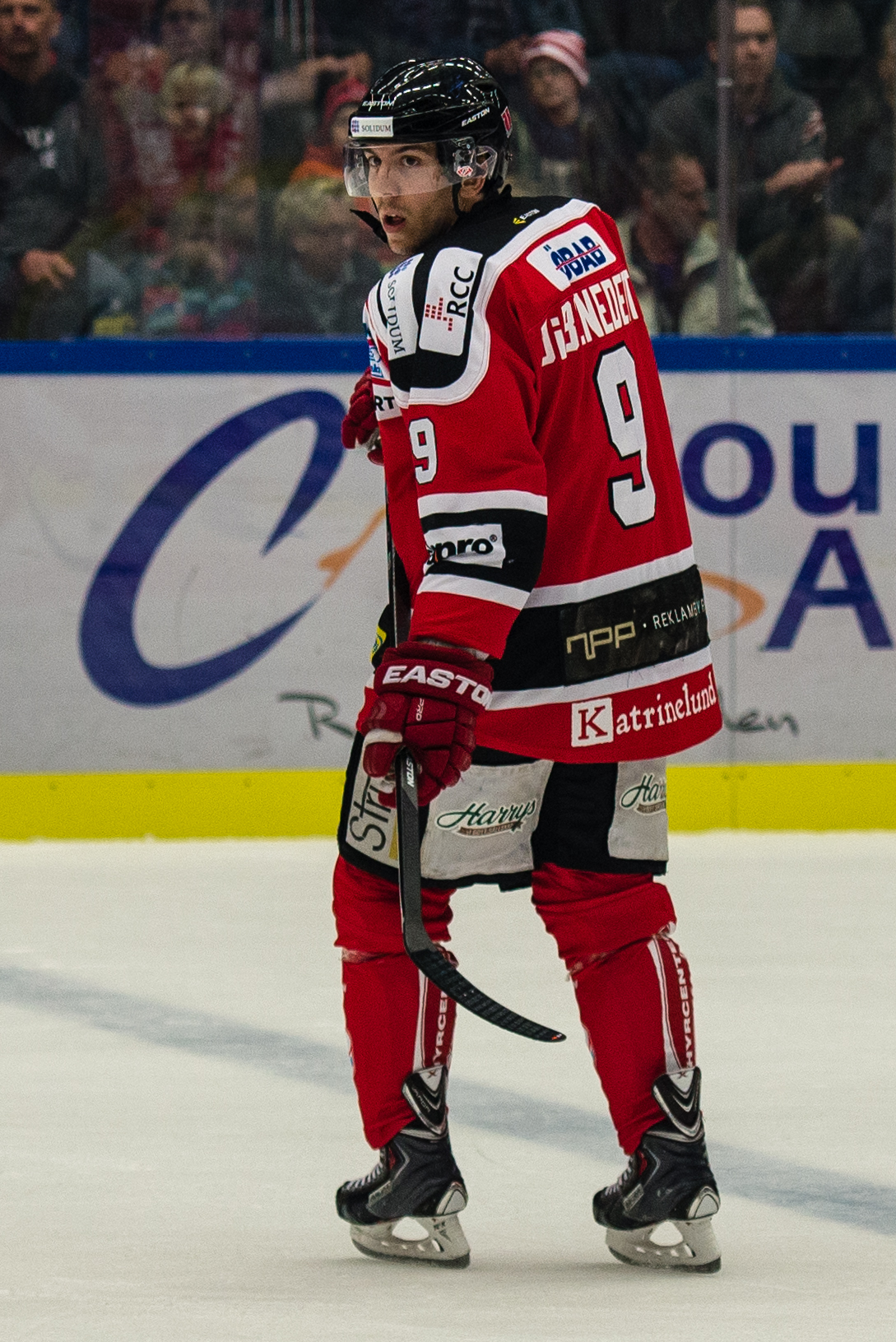
- DiBenedetto in 2013
- Born: August 25, 1988 (age 38) Maple, Ontario, Canada
- Height: 6 ft 0 in (183 cm)
- Weight: 198 lb (90 kg; 14 st 2 lb)
- Position: Centre
- Shot: Left
- Played for: New York Islanders; EC Red Bull Salzburg; Örebro HK; Espoo Blues; Dornbirner EC; Ritten/Renon
- NHL draft: 175th overall, 2008; New York Islanders
- Playing career: 2009–2015

Justin DiBenedetto (born August 25, 1988) is a Canadian former professional ice hockey player. DiBenedetto was drafted 175th overall by the New York Islanders during the 2008 NHL entry draft. DiBenedetto was born in Maple, Ontario.

== Playing career ==
=== Junior ===
DiBenedetto began his junior hockey career with the Toronto St. Michael's Majors of the Ontario Hockey League in the 2004–05 season, recording nine points in 64 games as a rookie, followed by no points in nine playoff games. In the 2005–06 season, DiBenedetto saw his production increase, as he earned 30 points in 61 games, followed by a goal in four playoff contests. During the off-season, the Majors traded DiBenedetto to the Sarnia Sting.

DiBenedetto joined the Sting for the 2006–07 season, where he once again saw an increase in his production, as he finished with 63 points in 58 games, as well as a team high +21 rating. In the playoffs, DiBenedetto had three points in four games.

In 2007–08, DiBenedetto saw another big increase in his point production, as he finished second on the Sting with 93 points in 58 games. DiBenedetto then had ten points in nine playoff games for Sarnia. During the 2008 NHL entry draft, the New York Islanders drafted DiBenedetto in the sixth round.

DiBenedetto returned to Sarnia for his overage season in 2008–09, where in 62 games, he scored 45 goals and 93 points to lead the Sting, and finish third in the OHL scoring race, in five playoff games Justin had three assists. Following his successful campaign he was named to the OHL's Second All-Star team and was awarded the Leo Lalonde Memorial Trophy as the top overage player of the year.

=== Professional ===
When the Sting were eliminated from the playoffs, Justin signed a three-year entry-level contract with the New York Islanders on April 9, 2009. He was then assigned to the Islanders affiliate, the Bridgeport Sound Tigers of the AHL for the playoffs. In three post-season games with Bridgeport, DiBenedetto scored a goal.

He returned to the Sound Tigers for the 2009–10 season. DiBenedetto appeared to make his NHL debut in 8 games for the Islanders in the 2010-11 season, recording 1 assist. He then spent a final season in the Islanders organization as an alternate captain with the Sound Tigers.

In his third season abroad, DiBenedetto joined his fourth European club in returning to the Austrian Hockey League with Dornbirner EC on July 14, 2014. On February 2, 2015, DiBenedetto left Dornbirner and transferred for the remainder of the season with Italian club, Ritten/Renon of the Serie A.

== Career statistics ==
			Regular season					Playoffs
Season	Team	League	GP	G	A	Pts	PIM	GP	G	A	Pts	PIM
2004–05	Toronto St. Michael's Majors	OHL	64	3	6	9	37	9	0	0	0	0
2005–06	Toronto St. Michael's Majors	OHL	61	17	13	30	58	4	1	0	1	11
2006–07	Sarnia Sting	OHL	58	28	35	63	46	4	2	1	3	4
2007–08	Sarnia Sting	OHL	58	39	54	93	61	9	3	7	10	12
2008–09	Sarnia Sting	OHL	62	45	48	93	85	5	0	3	3	12
2008–09	Bridgeport Sound Tigers	AHL	—	—	—	—	—	3	1	0	1	4
2009–10	Bridgeport Sound Tigers	AHL	67	6	8	14	62	—	—	—	—	—
2010–11	Bridgeport Sound Tigers	AHL	51	19	11	30	45	—	—	—	—	—
2010–11	New York Islanders	NHL	8	0	1	1	2	—	—	—	—	—
2011–12	Bridgeport Sound Tigers	AHL	55	20	21	41	73	3	1	1	2	16
2012–13	EC Red Bull Salzburg	EBEL	47	19	25	44	36	12	3	5	8	12
2013–14	Örebro HK	SHL	35	7	5	12	55	—	—	—	—	—
2013–14	Blues	Liiga	21	2	3	5	20	7	0	1	1	0
2014–15	Dornbirner EC	EBEL	26	3	8	11	21	—	—	—	—	—
2014–15	Ritten/Renon	ITL	2	0	1	1	0	4	4	3	7	0
2018–19	Hamilton Steelhawks	ACH	17	20	10	30	18	7	4	3	7	15
2019–20	Hamilton Steelhawks	ACH	10	4	7	11	4	4	3	3	6	0
NHL totals			8	0	1	1	2	—	—	—	—	—

== Awards and honours ==
Award	Year(s)
OHL Second All-Star Team	2009
Leo Lalonde Memorial Trophy - OHL's Best Overage Player	2009
