= Rob Kwiet =

Canadian ice hockey player

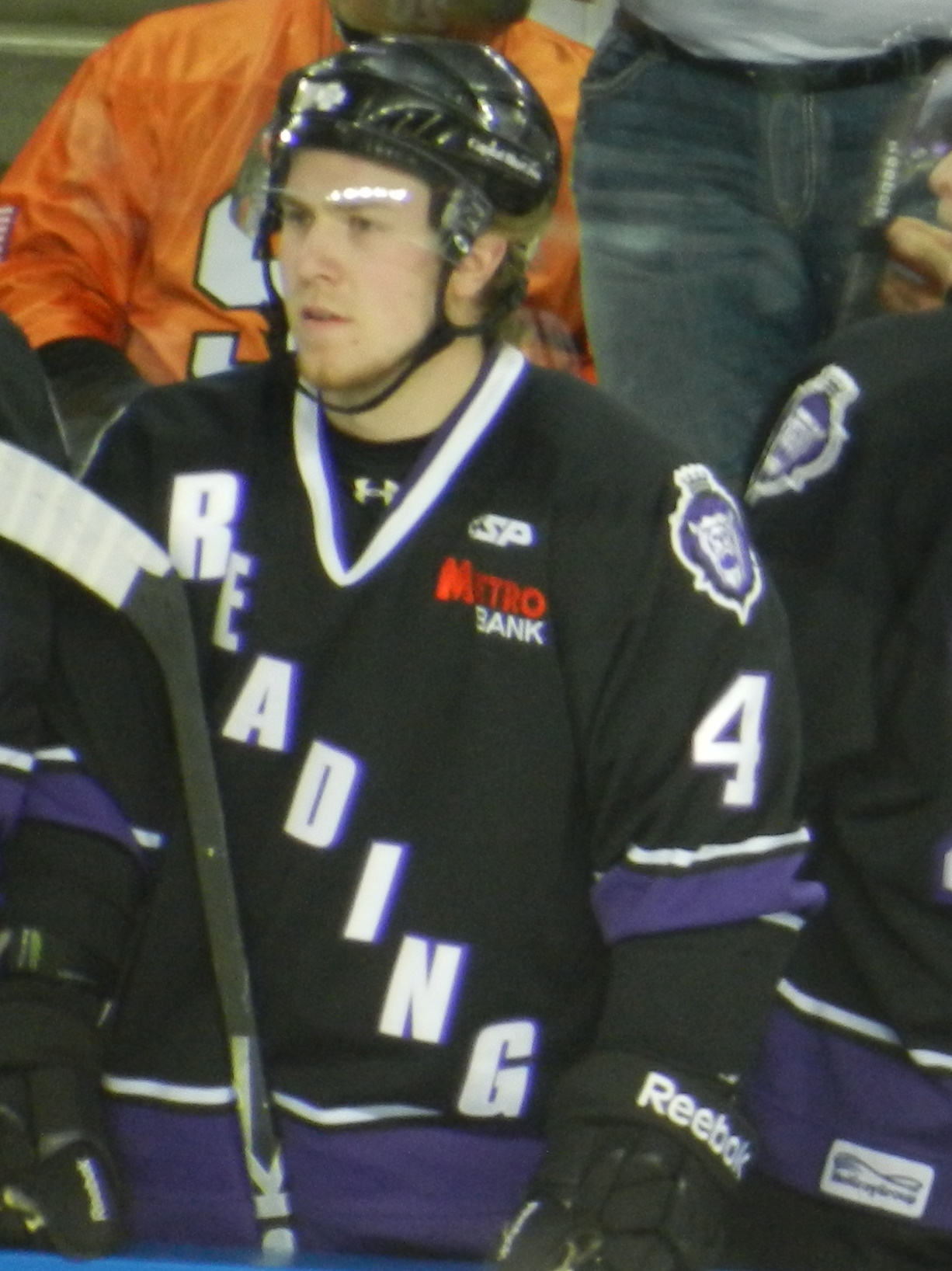
- Born: August 2, 1988 (age 37) Toronto, Ontario, Canada
- Height: 6 ft 1 in (185 cm)
- Weight: 218 lb (99 kg; 15 st 8 lb)
- Position: Defence
- Shot: Left
- Played for: Providence Bruins; Bridgeport Sound Tigers; ESV Kaufbeuren; Greenville Swamp Rabbits; San Francisco Bulls; Reading Royals
- NHL draft: Undrafted
- Playing career: 2008–2016

Rob Kwiet (born August 2, 1988) is a Canadian former professional ice hockey player.

== Playing career ==
Undrafted, Kwiet played major junior hockey in the Ontario Hockey League with the Mississauga St. Michael's Majors and the Windsor Spitfires.

On July 13, 2009, Kwiet signed a one-year contract with the Boston Bruins of the National Hockey League (NHL). On February 22, 2011, Kwiet signed a professional try out contract with the Bridgeport Sound Tigers of the American Hockey League (AHL).

On August 9, 2012, Kwiet was re-signed to a one-year contract with the Stockton Thunder. During the 2012–13 season, he was moved to the Greenville Road Warriors after one game before settling with the San Francisco Bulls on November 19, 2012.

On July 30, 2013, Kwiet signed a one-year contract as a free agent with his fifth ECHL club, the Fort Wayne Komets. In the 2013–14 season, on December 12, 2013, he was traded by the Komets to the Gwinnett Gladiators in exchange for Mike Embach. Kwiet then contributed with 23 points in 33 games before he was again traded to the Florida Everblades to finish the season.

Kweit signed abroad on July 19, 2014, as a free agent in agreeing to a one-year contract with the second division German club, ESV Kaufbeuren of the DEL2.

After a season in Germany, Kwiet returned to North America agreeing to a second stint with the Greenville Road Warriors (later renamed the Swamp Rabbits) of the ECHL on August 14, 2015.

In 2018, Kwiet competed in the National Ball Hockey Championships Division B with Windsor's Rosati Construction team.

== Career statistics ==
			Regular season					Playoffs
Season	Team	League	GP	G	A	Pts	PIM	GP	G	A	Pts	PIM
2004–05	Wellington Dukes	OPJHL	47	1	3	4	44	—	—	—	—	—
2005–06	Toronto St. Michael's Majors	OHL	63	3	9	12	76	—	—	—	—	—
2006–07	Toronto St. Michael's Majors	OHL	57	9	30	39	97	—	—	—	—	—
2007–08	Mississauga St. Michael's Majors	OHL	37	2	12	14	45	—	—	—	—	—
2007–08	Windsor Spitfires	OHL	27	3	10	13	36	5	0	3	3	2
2007–08	Muskegon Fury	IHL	7	0	0	0	4	4	0	0	0	6
2008–09	Windsor Spitfires	OHL	66	12	55	67	56	20	5	10	15	17
2009–10	Providence Bruins	AHL	41	1	0	1	24	—	—	—	—	—
2009–10	Reading Royals	ECHL	17	0	7	7	13	15	2	3	5	16
2010–11	Reading Royals	ECHL	56	8	22	30	39	4	1	3	4	2
2010–11	Bridgeport Sound Tigers	AHL	1	0	0	0	4	—	—	—	—	—
2011–12	Reading Royals	ECHL	48	5	16	21	42	—	—	—	—	—
2011–12	Stockton Thunder	ECHL	12	0	6	6	12	8	0	0	0	26
2012–13	Stockton Thunder	ECHL	1	0	0	0	0	—	—	—	—	—
2012–13	Greenville Road Warriors	ECHL	13	2	8	10	16	—	—	—	—	—
2012–13	San Francisco Bulls	ECHL	50	8	19	27	48	5	0	1	1	18
2013–14	Fort Wayne Komets	ECHL	20	0	7	7	10	—	—	—	—	—
2013–14	Gwinnett Gladiators	ECHL	33	8	15	23	24	—	—	—	—	—
2013–14	Florida Everblades	ECHL	15	1	10	11	4	—	—	—	—	—
2014–15	ESV Kaufbeuren	DEL2	52	9	28	37	62	—	—	—	—	—
2015–16	Greenville Swamp Rabbits	ECHL	50	5	16	21	41	—	—	—	—	—
AHL totals			42	1	0	1	28	—	—	—	—	—
