= Corey Cowick =

Canadian ice hockey player

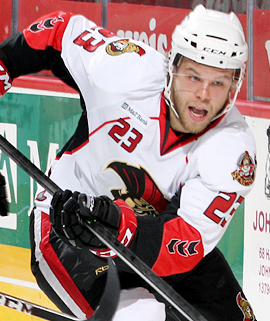
- Cowick with the Binghamton Senators in 2013
- Born: August 1, 1989 (age 36) Gloucester, Ontario, Canada
- Height: 6 ft 2 in (188 cm)
- Weight: 194 lb (88 kg; 13 st 12 lb)
- Position: Centre
- Shot: Left
- Played for: Binghamton Senators; Springfield Falcons; Braehead Clan
- NHL draft: 160th overall, 2009; Ottawa Senators
- Playing career: 2010–2017

Corey Cowick (born August 1, 1989) is a Canadian former professional ice hockey forward. He most notably played in the American Hockey League (AHL) for the Binghamton Senators and Springfield Falcons.

== Playing career ==
Cowick was selected by the Ottawa Senators in the 6th round (160th overall) of the 2009 NHL entry draft. Prior to turning professional, he played major junior hockey in the Ontario Hockey League for the Oshawa Generals before emerging as a budding star on Ottawa 67's during Brian Kilrea's last year coaching minor hockey. On August 5, 2010, the Ottawa Senators signed Cowick to an entry-level contract. Within his tenure with the Senators, Cowick played in the American Hockey League with affiliate, the Binghamton Senators managing to win a Calder Cup in the 2010-2011 season.

After a single season with the Springfield Falcons, Cowick was signed to a one-year contract with the Florida Everblades of the ECHL on August 7, 2015.

Following the completion of his contract with the Everblades, Cowick left for abroad as a free agent to sign a one-year deal with Scottish club, Braehead Clan of the Elite Ice Hockey League on July 8, 2016. After a productive first season abroad, Cowick moved on to French club, Gamyo d'Épinal of the Ligue Magnus in May 2017, following in the footsteps of fellow EIHL players Matt Carter and Alex Nikiforuk who both moved to Gamyo from Nottingham ahead of the 2017–18 season.

Cowick was later released from his contract in France, and ended his seven year professional career after undergoing a second shoulder reconstruction. He joined the Canadian International Hockey Academy as a guidance counsellor and coach, while preparing for the ambition to pursue a firefighting career.

== Career statistics ==
			Regular season					Playoffs
Season	Team	League	GP	G	A	Pts	PIM	GP	G	A	Pts	PIM
2005–06	Orleans Blues	CJHL	54	11	7	18	72	—	—	—	—	—
2006–07	Oshawa Generals	OHL	67	4	4	8	54	9	0	0	0	2
2007–08	Oshawa Generals	OHL	63	11	14	25	79	15	1	1	2	22
2008–09	Ottawa 67's	OHL	68	34	26	60	48	7	7	2	9	14
2009–10	Ottawa 67's	OHL	27	15	6	21	33	12	9	3	12	27
2010–11	Binghamton Senators	AHL	30	1	3	4	20	—	—	—	—	—
2010–11	Elmira Jackals	ECHL	31	5	9	14	76	—	—	—	—	—
2011–12	Binghamton Senators	AHL	53	5	6	11	38	—	—	—	—	—
2011–12	Elmira Jackals	ECHL	22	8	5	13	20	8	2	0	2	26
2012–13	Binghamton Senators	AHL	72	16	19	35	85	3	0	0	0	2
2013–14	Binghamton Senators	AHL	72	12	13	25	89	3	1	0	1	2
2014–15	Springfield Falcons	AHL	46	6	3	9	47	—	—	—	—	—
2015–16	Florida Everblades	ECHL	66	14	12	26	114	5	0	0	0	2
2016–17	Braehead Clan	EIHL	42	13	20	33	167	2	0	0	0	0
AHL totals			273	40	44	84	279	6	1	0	1	4
