= Greg Nemisz =

Canadian ice hockey player

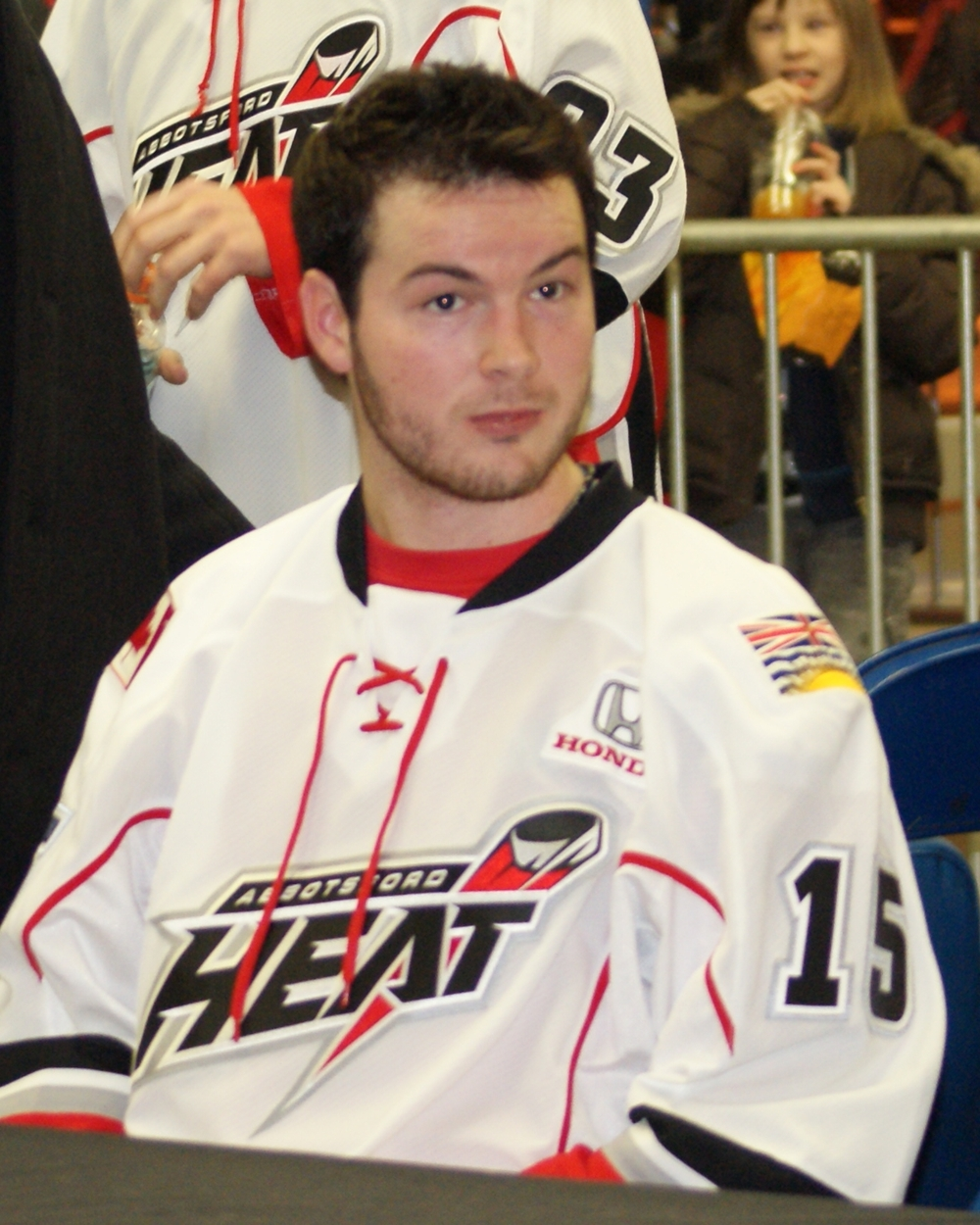
- Nemisz with the Abbotsford Heat in 2011
- Born: June 5, 1990 (age 36) Courtice, Ontario, Canada
- Height: 6 ft 4 in (193 cm)
- Weight: 207 lb (94 kg; 14 st 11 lb)
- Position: Right wing
- Shot: Right
- Played for: Calgary Flames
- NHL draft: 25th overall, 2008; Calgary Flames
- Playing career: 2010–2015

Gregory Nemisz (born June 5, 1990) is a Canadian former professional ice hockey winger who appeared in 15 National Hockey League (NHL) games during a four-year professional career. He is currently serving as an assistant coach with the Oshawa Generals of the Ontario Hockey League (OHL).

Nemisz was a first-round selection, 25th overall, at the 2008 NHL entry draft by the Calgary Flames and made his NHL debut with the Flames in 2011. Nemisz spent the majority of his career in the American Hockey League (AHL) with Calgary's affiliate, the Abbotsford Heat, and then the Charlotte Checkers, affiliate of the NHL's Carolina Hurricanes. Internationally, Nemisz was a member of Team Canada's silver medal-winning squad at the 2010 World Junior Ice Hockey Championships. He retired as a player in 2015 to become an assistant coach of the Oshawa Generals.

== Playing career ==
Nemisz joined the OHL's Windsor Spitfires in 2006–07, recording 34 points in 62 games. He improved to 67 points in 68 games with the Spitfires the following year, earning the team award for dedication and determination. His season led the Calgary Flames to select him with their first-round selection, 25th overall, at the 2008 NHL entry draft, who project him to become a power forward. Nemisz set career highs with the Spitfires in 2008–09, scoring 36 goals and 77 points in 65 games, while adding 20 points in 20 games as he helped his team capture the J. Ross Robertson Cup as OHL champions. He then went on to score a goal and six assists in the 2009 Memorial Cup as the Spitfires defeated the Western Hockey League's Kelowna Rockets to win the national junior championship.

He participated in training camp with the Flames, but was sent back to Windsor for the 2009–10 OHL season where he was expected to be a top player in the OHL. His play earned him a spot on the Canadian junior team for the 2010 World Junior Hockey Championships where he won a silver medal. He finished the season in Windsor with 70 points in 51 games, helping the Spitfires to win their second consecutive OHL championship while also capturing the 2010 Memorial Cup.

Nemisz turned professional in the 2010–11 season and was assigned to the Flames' American Hockey League (AHL) affiliate, the Abbotsford Heat. He had 14 goals and 32 points in Abbotsford when he was called up to the Flames in late March. He made his NHL debut on March 23, 2011, in a 6–3 loss to the San Jose Sharks. He spent the majority of the 2011–12 season in Abbotsford and missed five weeks of play due to a shoulder injury. He earned several recalls to Calgary, playing both on the wing and at centre as the team's needs required.

The Flames re-signed Nemisz to a one-year, two-way contract before the 2013–14 season, and spent the first half of the season with Abbotsford before being traded to the Carolina Hurricanes organization on December 30, 2013, in exchange for Kevin Westgarth. Nemisz was assigned to Carolina's AHL affiliate, the Charlotte Checkers where he remained to complete that season, and where he played in 2014–15. He recorded 14 points in 21 games for Charlotte before suffering a season-ending knee injury. It was his third major injury in three years.

While recovering from the injury, Nemisz joined the OHL's Oshawa Generals as a volunteer video coach during the team's 2015 run to the Ontario Hockey League and 2015 Memorial Cup championships. Nemisz ended his playing career following the season to take on a full-time role as an assistant coach with the Generals.

== Personal life ==
Greg Nemisz is now a firefighter.

== Career statistics ==
=== Regular season and playoffs ===
| | | | Regular season | | | | | Playoffs |
| Season | Team | League | GP | G | A | Pts | PIM | GP | G | A | Pts | PIM |
|---|---|---|---|---|---|---|---|---|---|---|---|---|
| 2006–07 | Windsor Spitfires | OHL | 62 | 11 | 23 | 34 | 23 | — | — | — | — | — |
| 2007–08 | Windsor Spitfires | OHL | 68 | 34 | 33 | 67 | 52 | 5 | 2 | 1 | 3 | 8 |
| 2008–09 | Windsor Spitfires | OHL | 65 | 36 | 41 | 77 | 48 | 20 | 8 | 12 | 20 | 22 |
| 2009–10 | Windsor Spitfires | OHL | 51 | 34 | 36 | 70 | 50 | 15 | 2 | 10 | 12 | 12 |
| 2010–11 | Abbotsford Heat | AHL | 68 | 14 | 19 | 33 | 28 | — | — | — | — | — |
| 2010–11 | Calgary Flames | NHL | 6 | 0 | 1 | 1 | 0 | — | — | — | — | — |
| 2011–12 | Abbotsford Heat | AHL | 51 | 13 | 16 | 29 | 29 | 8 | 2 | 4 | 6 | 4 |
| 2011–12 | Calgary Flames | NHL | 9 | 0 | 0 | 0 | 0 | — | — | — | — | — |
| 2012–13 | Abbotsford Heat | AHL | 55 | 3 | 7 | 10 | 34 | — | — | — | — | — |
| 2013–14 | Abbotsford Heat | AHL | 32 | 5 | 4 | 9 | 9 | — | — | — | — | — |
| 2013–14 | Charlotte Checkers | AHL | 14 | 3 | 8 | 11 | 4 | — | — | — | — | — |
| 2014–15 | Charlotte Checkers | AHL | 21 | 8 | 6 | 14 | 6 | — | — | — | — | — |
| AHL totals | | | 241 | 46 | 60 | 106 | 110 | 8 | 2 | 4 | 6 | 4 |
| NHL totals | | | 15 | 0 | 1 | 1 | 0 | — | — | — | — | — |

Medal record

Representing Canada

Men's ice hockey

World Junior Championship
| Silver medal – second place | 2010 Canada | |

=== International ===
| Year | Team | Event | Result | GP | G | A | Pts | PIM |
|---|---|---|---|---|---|---|---|---|
| 2008 | Canada | WJC18 | 1st place, gold medalist(s) | 7 | 2 | 1 | 3 | 6 |
| 2010 | Canada | WJC | 2nd place, silver medalist(s) | 6 | 1 | 0 | 1 | 0 |
| Junior totals | | | | 13 | 3 | 1 | 4 | 6 |

== Awards and honours ==
| Award | Year |
|---|---|
Junior
| OHL Second All-Star Team | 2008–09 |

Awards and achievements
| Preceded by Mikael Backlund | Calgary Flames first-round draft pick 2008 | Succeeded by Tim Erixon |
