= Lane MacDermid =

Canadian ice hockey player

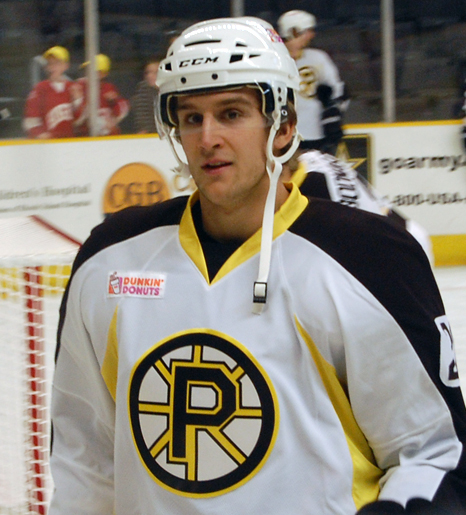
- MacDermid with the Providence Bruins in 2010
- Born: August 25, 1989 (age 36) Hartford, Connecticut, U.S.
- Height: 6 ft 3 in (191 cm)
- Weight: 205 lb (93 kg; 14 st 9 lb)
- Position: Forward
- Shot: Left
- Played for: Boston Bruins; Dallas Stars; Calgary Flames
- NHL draft: 112th overall, 2009; Boston Bruins
- Playing career: 2009–2014

Lane Phillip MacDermid (born August 25, 1989) is an American-born Canadian former professional ice hockey player. He played as a forward in the National Hockey League (NHL) with the Boston Bruins, Dallas Stars and Calgary Flames.

== Playing career ==
MacDermid was selected by the Boston Bruins in the fourth round (112th overall) of the 2009 NHL entry draft. After starting his professional career with the club's American Hockey League (AHL) affiliate, the Providence Bruins, and in his fourth year with the Bruins organization, on March 3, 2012, MacDermid was recalled to Boston for the first time after an injury to Daniel Paille.

During the lockout-shortened 2012–13 season, on April 2, 2013, MacDermid was traded by Boston, along with prospect, Cody Payne, and a conditional second-round draft pick, to the Dallas Stars in exchange for Jaromír Jágr. In his Stars debut, he scored his first NHL goal and point in a defeat against the Anaheim Ducks on April 3, 2013. His father Paul MacDermid scored his first career NHL goal 31 years ago to the day, one of two sets to do it.

Developing as a fourth-line grinder who finishes his checks and is willing to stick up for his teammates, MacDermid made the Dallas Stars roster to open the 2013–14 season. After only six games with the Stars through the first two months of the season, MacDermid was traded to the Calgary Flames for a 2014 sixth-round pick on November 22, 2013. He was assigned to their AHL affiliate, the Abbotsford Heat, before he was later recalled and made his Flames debut, fighting against Cody McLeod of the Colorado Avalanche, on December 6, 2013. It was his only appearance with the Flames before he was returned to the Heat.

On February 25, 2014, MacDermid announced his retirement at age 24 shortly after being suspended from the Calgary Flames for failing to report to the Abbotsford Heat. He said his decision to retire was due to no longer having the desire to play professional hockey.

== Personal life ==
MacDermid is the son of former NHL player Paul MacDermid and was born in Hartford, Connecticut, during his father's stint with the Hartford Whalers, but was raised in Sauble Beach, Ontario. His younger brother, Kurtis plays in the NHL with the Ottawa Senators.

== Career statistics ==
			Regular season					Playoffs
Season	Team	League	GP	G	A	Pts	PIM	GP	G	A	Pts	PIM
2006–07	Owen Sound Attack	OHL	57	2	5	7	115	4	1	0	1	2
2007–08	Owen Sound Attack	OHL	66	13	11	24	190	—	—	—	—	—
2008–09	Owen Sound Attack	OHL	26	8	6	14	85	—	—	—	—	—
2008–09	Windsor Spitfires	OHL	38	7	14	21	112	20	4	5	9	38
2009–10	Providence Bruins	AHL	65	2	3	5	155	—	—	—	—	—
2010–11	Providence Bruins	AHL	78	7	12	19	158	—	—	—	—	—
2011–12	Providence Bruins	AHL	69	4	12	16	121	—	—	—	—	—
2011–12	Boston Bruins	NHL	5	0	0	0	5	—	—	—	—	—
2012–13	Providence Bruins	AHL	37	4	2	6	82	—	—	—	—	—
2012–13	Boston Bruins	NHL	3	0	0	0	10	—	—	—	—	—
2012–13	Dallas Stars	NHL	6	2	0	2	9	—	—	—	—	—
2013–14	Dallas Stars	NHL	6	0	2	2	5	—	—	—	—	—
2013–14	Abbotsford Heat	AHL	25	1	1	2	24	—	—	—	—	—
2013–14	Calgary Flames	NHL	1	0	0	0	7	—	—	—	—	—
NHL totals			21	2	2	4	36	—	—	—	—	—
