= David Kolomatis =

American ice hockey player (born 1989)

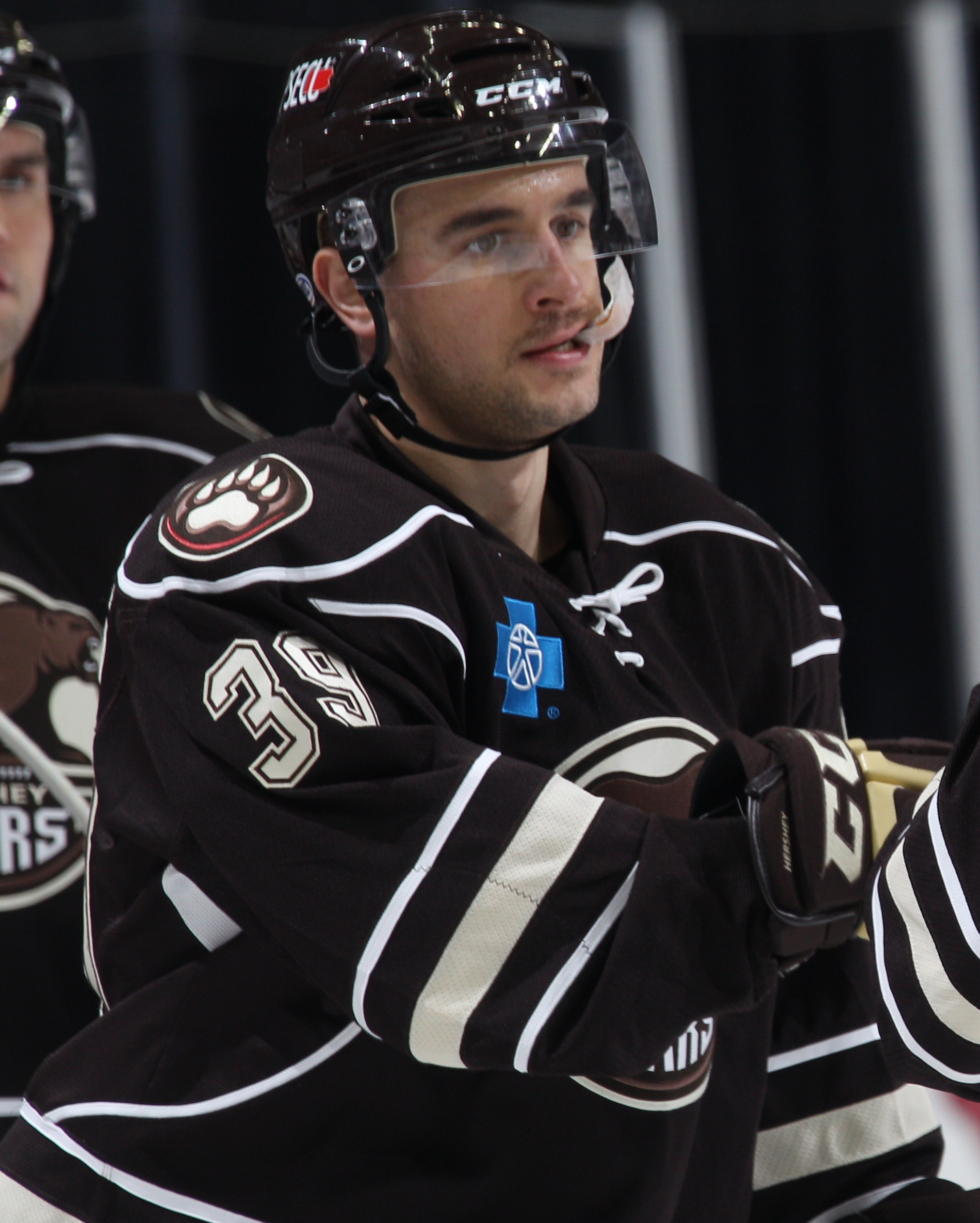
- Kolomatis with the Hershey Bears in 2013
- Born: February 25, 1989 (age 37) Livingston, New Jersey, U.S.
- Height: 5 ft 11 in (180 cm)
- Weight: 190 lb (86 kg; 13 st 8 lb)
- Position: Defenceman
- Shot: Right
- Played for: Providence Bruins; Manchester Monarchs; Hershey Bears; Tappara; Toronto Marlies
- NHL draft: 126th overall, 2009; Los Angeles Kings
- Playing career: 2009–2019

David Kolomatis (born February 25, 1989) is a retired American professional ice hockey player who last played for the Manchester Monarchs in the ECHL. He was originally drafted by the Los Angeles Kings in the fifth round, 126th overall, of the 2009 NHL entry draft.

== Playing career ==
After playing four seasons with the Manchester Monarchs, the AHL affiliate of the Los Angeles Kings, Kolomatis departed as a free agent. They signed a one-year, two-way contract with the Washington Capitals on July 5, 2013. During his lone season with the Capitals organization in 2013–14, he was assigned to their AHL affiliate, the Hershey Bears, where he tallied 30 points over 61 games.

On July 25, 2014, Kolomatis signed a one-year deal as a free agent to play overseas with Tappara in Finland's Liiga. During the 2014–15 season, his only year abroad, he recorded 1 goal and totaled 12 points over 45 games.

The next season, Kolomatis rejoined the Los Angeles Kings organization by signing a one-year contract on October 2, 2015, with their newly reestablished ECHL affiliate, the Manchester Monarchs. He served as team captain during the 2015–16 campaign, recording 17 points in 35 games before being loaned to the AHL's Toronto Marlies. He later signed on to remain with the Marlies for the rest of the season, playing in 23 games.

During the off-season, Kolomatis decided to continue his tenure with Manchester, opting to return for a sixth consecutive season with the team. On August 17, 2016, he formalized this decision by signing a new one-year contract, demonstrating his commitment to the organization and his desire to contribute further to the Monarchs' success.

== Career statistics ==
			Regular season					Playoffs
Season	Team	League	GP	G	A	Pts	PIM	GP	G	A	Pts	PIM
2005–06	U.S. National Under-18 Team	USHL	16	1	0	1	4	—	—	—	—	—
2006–07	Owen Sound Attack	OHL	67	4	16	20	54	4	0	0	0	0
2007–08	Owen Sound Attack	OHL	68	9	36	45	68	—	—	—	—	—
2008–09	Owen Sound Attack	OHL	63	18	28	46	52	4	2	2	4	0
2008–09	Providence Bruins	AHL	4	0	0	0	0	16	0	1	1	2
2009–10	Manchester Monarchs	AHL	76	8	21	29	30	15	0	1	1	2
2010–11	Manchester Monarchs	AHL	70	8	20	28	58	7	2	2	4	2
2011–12	Manchester Monarchs	AHL	58	5	20	25	12	4	0	1	1	4
2012–13	Manchester Monarchs	AHL	46	8	20	28	18	4	0	0	0	6
2013–14	Hershey Bears	AHL	61	7	23	30	22	—	—	—	—	—
2014–15	Tappara	Liiga	45	1	11	12	22	—	—	—	—	—
2015–16	Manchester Monarchs	ECHL	35	6	11	17	16	—	—	—	—	—
2015–16	Toronto Marlies	AHL	23	1	3	4	8	—	—	—	—	—
2016–17	Manchester Monarchs	ECHL	61	7	28	35	10	19	2	5	7	10
2017–18	Manchester Monarchs	ECHL	57	6	24	30	24	9	3	2	5	6
2018–19	Manchester Monarchs	ECHL	71	14	29	43	12	11	1	3	4	4
AHL totals			338	37	107	144	148	46	2	5	7	16
