= Paul MacDermid =

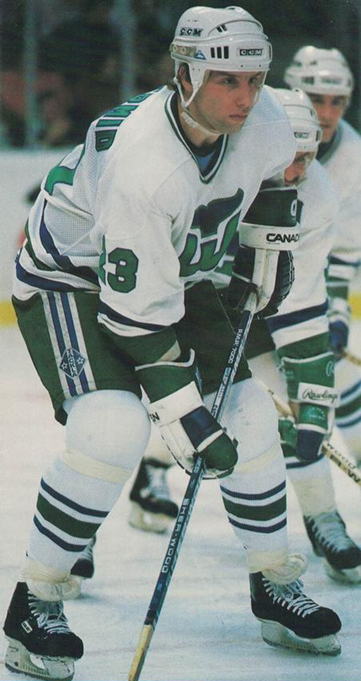
- MacDermid in 1986 card
- Born: April 14, 1963 (age 63) Chesley, Ontario, Canada
- Height: 6 ft 1 in (185 cm)
- Weight: 200 lb (91 kg; 14 st 4 lb)
- Position: Right wing
- Shot: Right
- Played for: Hartford Whalers; Winnipeg Jets; Washington Capitals; Quebec Nordiques
- NHL draft: 61st overall, 1981; Hartford Whalers
- Playing career: 1983–1995

Paul MacDermid (born April 14, 1963) is a Canadian former professional ice hockey right winger who played 690 games in the National Hockey League (NHL) for the Hartford Whalers, Winnipeg Jets, Washington Capitals, and Quebec Nordiques. MacDermid was selected 61st overall in the 1981 NHL entry draft by Hartford. He played his junior career with the Windsor Spitfires of the Ontario Hockey League.

His oldest son, Lane was selected by the Boston Bruins in the 2009 NHL entry draft. Lane scored his first career NHL goal exactly 31 years after the same was done by Paul. They are only the second pair of father and son who scored their first goals on one date. His younger son, Kurtis is a forward for the Ottawa Senators.

== Career statistics ==
=== Regular season and playoffs ===
			Regular season					Playoffs
Season	Team	League	GP	G	A	Pts	PIM	GP	G	A	Pts	PIM
1980–81	Windsor Spitfires	OHL	68	15	17	32	106	—	—	—	—	—
1981–82	Hartford Whalers	NHL	3	1	0	1	2	—	—	—	—	—
1981–82	Windsor Spitfires	OHL	65	26	45	71	179	9	6	4	10	17
1982–83	Hartford Whalers	NHL	7	0	0	0	2	—	—	—	—	—
1982–83	Windsor Spitfires	OHL	42	35	45	80	90	—	—	—	—	—
1983–84	Hartford Whalers	NHL	3	0	1	1	0	—	—	—	—	—
1983–84	Binghamton Whalers	AHL	70	31	30	61	130	—	—	—	—	—
1984–85	Hartford Whalers	NHL	31	4	7	11	29	—	—	—	—	—
1984–85	Binghamton Whalers	AHL	48	9	31	40	87	—	—	—	—	—
1985–86	Hartford Whalers	NHL	74	13	10	23	160	10	2	1	3	20
1986–87	Hartford Whalers	NHL	72	7	11	18	202	6	2	1	3	34
1987–88	Hartford Whalers	NHL	80	20	15	35	139	6	0	5	5	14
1988–89	Hartford Whalers	NHL	74	17	27	44	141	4	1	1	2	16
1989–90	Hartford Whalers	NHL	29	6	12	18	69	—	—	—	—	—
1989–90	Winnipeg Jets	NHL	44	7	10	17	100	7	0	2	2	8
1990–91	Winnipeg Jets	NHL	69	15	21	36	128	—	—	—	—	—
1991–92	Winnipeg Jets	NHL	59	10	11	21	151	—	—	—	—	—
1991–92	Washington Capitals	NHL	15	2	5	7	43	7	0	1	1	22
1992–93	Washington Capitals	NHL	72	9	8	17	80	—	—	—	—	—
1993–94	Quebec Nordiques	NHL	44	2	3	5	35	—	—	—	—	—
1994–95	Quebec Nordiques	NHL	14	3	1	4	22	3	0	0	0	2
NHL totals			690	116	142	258	1303	43	5	11	16	116
AHL totals			118	40	61	101	217	—	—	—	—	—
