= Eric Wellwood =

Canadian ice hockey player and coach

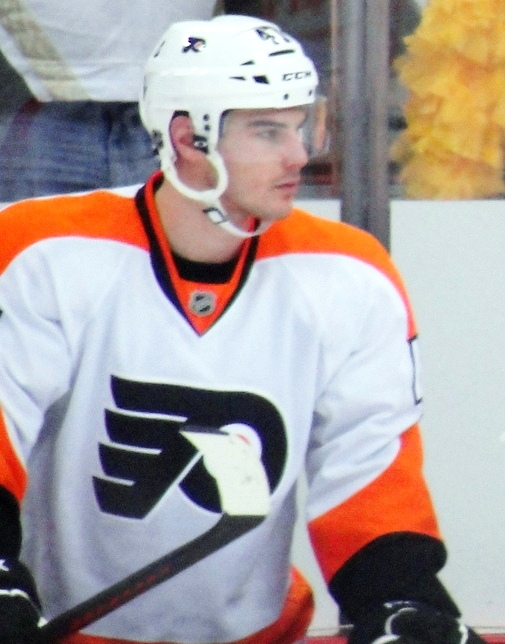
- Wellwood with the Philadelphia Flyers in 2012
- Born: March 6, 1990 (age 36) Windsor, Ontario, Canada
- Height: 5 ft 11 in (180 cm)
- Weight: 180 lb (82 kg; 12 st 12 lb)
- Position: Left wing
- Shot: Left
- Played for: Philadelphia Flyers
- NHL draft: 172nd overall, 2009; Philadelphia Flyers
- Playing career: 2010–2013

Eric Wellwood (born March 6, 1990) is a Canadian former professional ice hockey player and current assistant coach for the Toronto Marlies in the AHL. He played parts of three National Hockey League (NHL) seasons with the Philadelphia Flyers. He is the younger brother of Kyle Wellwood.

== Playing career ==
Wellwood was drafted by the Philadelphia Flyers in the sixth round (172nd overall) of the 2009 NHL entry draft. He signed a three-year, entry-level contract with the Flyers on March 4, 2010, after playing four seasons of junior hockey with the Windsor Spitfires, with whom he helped win two straight Memorial Cup championships in 2009 and 2010. Wellwood was called up from the Adirondack Phantoms on November 1, 2010, in the wake of Flyers forward Danny Briere's three-game suspension and made his NHL debut against the Carolina Hurricanes on a line with James van Riemsdyk and Mike Richards. Wellwood recorded his first NHL point on November 6 against the New York Islanders, assisting on Andreas Nodl's game-winning goal at 14:35 of the third period. During the 2011 Stanley Cup playoffs, the Flyers called up Wellwood and a few other players, but he did not dress for a game. Wellwood scored his first NHL goal February 18, 2012, against the Pittsburgh Penguins, an unassisted goal against Marc-Andre Fleury.

On April 7, 2013, during an AHL game, Wellwood was injured after his left skate accidentally cut the back of his right leg after falling awkwardly into the boards. His achilles tendon was 70 percent severed and three additional tendons were completely severed. Wellwood was expected to miss nine months. Wellwood then retired after missing the entire 2013–14 season.

== Coaching career ==
While rehabbing from his April 2013 injury, he served as a volunteer coach with the Windsor Spitfires of the Ontario Hockey League (OHL) during the 2013–14 season. After retiring from playing, he was hired as an assistant coaching position with the OHL's Oshawa Generals from 2014 to 2016. On May 20, 2016, Wellwood was named assistant coach for the OHL's Flint Firebirds and was promoted to head coach on October 18, 2018, after the Firebirds had opened the season 0–9. In the COVID-19 pandemic-shortened 2019–20 season, he led the Firebirds to their best record before the pandemic curtailed the season. The 2020–21 season was then cancelled and Wellwood chose to not renew his contract with the Firebirds in May 2021.

In August 2021, he was hired as the head coach of the Newfoundland Growlers in the ECHL.

In July 2023, Eric was hired as Assistant Coach of the AHL's Toronto Marlies.

== Career statistics ==
			Regular season					Playoffs
Season	Team	League	GP	G	A	Pts	PIM	GP	G	A	Pts	PIM
2006–07	Tecumseh Chiefs	OJHL-B	34	10	10	20	33	—	—	—	—	—
2006–07	Windsor Spitfires	OHL	23	2	5	7	0	—	—	—	—	—
2007–08	Windsor Spitfires	OHL	68	9	7	16	12	5	0	0	0	2
2008–09	Windsor Spitfires	OHL	61	16	18	34	12	20	10	11	21	12
2009–10	Windsor Spitfires	OHL	65	31	37	68	36	19	4	6	10	6
2010–11	Adirondack Phantoms	AHL	73	16	12	28	24	—	—	—	—	—
2010–11	Philadelphia Flyers	NHL	3	0	1	1	2	—	—	—	—	—
2011–12	Adirondack Phantoms	AHL	33	9	12	21	8	—	—	—	—	—
2011–12	Philadelphia Flyers	NHL	24	5	4	9	2	11	0	0	0	2
2012–13	Adirondack Phantoms	AHL	58	9	8	17	10	—	—	—	—	—
2012–13	Philadelphia Flyers	NHL	4	0	0	0	0	—	—	—	—	—
NHL totals			31	5	5	10	4	11	0	0	0	2
