= Andrew Engelage =

Canadian ice hockey player

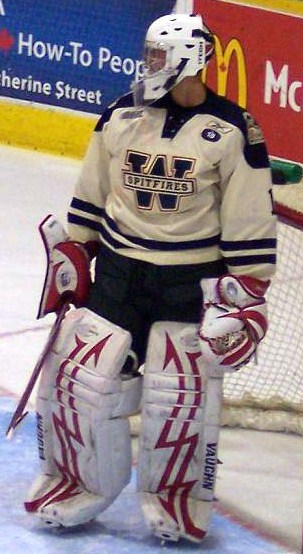
- Engelage with the Windsor Spitfires in 2008
- Born: October 26, 1988 (age 38) Oshawa, Ontario, Canada
- Height: 6 ft 5 in (196 cm)
- Weight: 220 lb (100 kg; 15 st 10 lb)
- Position: Goaltender
- Caught: Left
- Played for: Toronto Marlies; Storhamar Dragons; Ritten/Renon; BIK Karlskoga; Krefeld Pinguine; Graz 99ers Utah Grizzlies; Reading Royals; Arizona Sundogs; Whitby Dunlops
- NHL draft: Undrafted
- Playing career: 2009–2020

Andrew Engelage (born October 26, 1988) is a Canadian former professional ice hockey goaltender.

Prior to turning professional, Engelage played for the Windsor Spitfires of the Ontario Hockey League (OHL). He helped the Spitfires capture the Memorial Cup, and set the OHL's single season record for wins by a goaltender, with 46.

== Playing career ==
=== Junior ===
Engelage played junior hockey in the Ontario Hockey League (OHL) for the Windsor Spitfires. He was named the OHL's Goaltender of the Month in October 2008 and the Canadian Hockey League Goaltender of the Week twice (October 28, 2008 and May 3, 2009) during the season.

During the 2008–09 OHL season, Engelage played 54 games with the Spitfires earning a record of 46-4-1 with a 2.35 goals-against average and 0.914 save percentage, and was named to play in the OHL's mid-season All-Star Classic game as a member of the Western Conference team. His total of 46 regular season wins set the OHL single season record for wins by a goaltender. Including playoffs, Engelage won 64 games that season, while helping the Spitfires win the Memorial Cup.

=== Professional ===
Engelage started playing professional hockey during the 2009–10 season. He split time that year between the Toronto Marlies of the American Hockey League and the Reading Royals of the ECHL. He started the 2010–11 season with the Utah Grizzlies of the ECHL, and was named the league's Goaltender of the Week for January 3, 2011 and January 31, 2011. Engelage rejoined the Toronto Marlies by signing an amateur tryout contract when the Toronto Maple Leafs organization ran into a series of injuries to goaltenders. Engelage won his first start with the Marlies, shortly after signing his contract, impressing head coach Dallas Eakins, "I thought he played a great game for us, coming in cold after travelling all day with no practise and we throw him right in there."

After spending the duration of the 2016–17 season, with Swedish club, BIK Karlskoga of the HockeyAllsvenskan, Engelage left as a free agent in moving to the DEL with German outfit, Krefeld Pinguine, on a one-year deal on May 13, 2017.

== Awards and honours ==
Award	Year
CHL Most Outstanding Goaltender	2013–14
