= Eddy Rinke-Leitans =

German-Latvian ice hockey player

Eddy Rinke-Leitāns
- Born: 26 July 1991 (age 33); Ebersberg, Germany
- Height: 6 ft 4 in (193 cm)
- Weight: 205 lb (93 kg; 14 st 9 lb)
- Position: Right wing
- Shoots: Left
- DEL team Former teams: ERC Ingolstadt; EHC Freiburg; RT Bad Nauheim
- National team: Latvia
- Playing career: 2010–present

Eddy Rinke-Leitans (Latvian: Edijs Rinke-Leitāns; born 26 July 1991) is a German-Latvian professional ice hockey player. He currently plays for ERC Ingolstadt in the Deutsche Eishockey Liga
