= 2007–08 OHL season =

- League: Ontario Hockey League
- Sport: Hockey
- Duration: Regular season Sept. 19, 2007 – Mar. 16, 2008; Playoffs; Mar. 19, 2008 – May 12, 2008
- Teams: 20
- TV partner(s): Rogers TV, TVCogeco

Draft
- Top draft pick: Ryan O'Reilly
- Picked by: Erie Otters

Regular season
- Hamilton Spectator Trophy: Kitchener Rangers (7)
- Season MVP: Justin Azevedo (Kitchener Rangers)
- Top scorer: Justin Azevedo (Kitchener Rangers)

Playoffs
- Playoffs MVP: Justin Azevedo (Rangers)
- Finals champions: Kitchener Rangers (4)
- Runners-up: Belleville Bulls

OHL seasons
- 2006–07 2008–09

2007–08 CHL season
- League: Canadian Hockey League
- Sport: Hockey
- Duration: OHL; Sept. 19, 2007 – Mar. 16, 2008; QMJHL; Sept. 13, 2007 – Mar. 16, 2008; WHL; Sept. 20, 2007 – Mar. 16, 2008
- Teams: 60
- TV partner(s): RDS; Rogers Sportsnet; Rogers TV; Shaw TV
- Season MVP: Justin Azevedo (Kitchener Rangers) (OHL)
- Top scorer: Justin Azevedo (Kitchener Rangers) (OHL)

Memorial Cup
- Finals champions: Spokane Chiefs (WHL) (2nd title)
- Runners-up: Kitchener Rangers (OHL)

The 2007–08 OHL season was the 28th season of the Ontario Hockey League. Twenty teams played 68 games each during the schedule, that started on September 19, 2007, and concluded on March 16, 2008. The Mississauga IceDogs relocated to the Gatorade Garden City Complex in downtown St. Catharines after getting approval of the team's sale to Bill Burke by the Board of Governors on June 5, 2007. The team was renamed the Niagara IceDogs. The Toronto St. Michael's Majors replaced the IceDogs in the Hershey Centre, renaming themselves, the Mississauga St. Michael's Majors. The Kingston Frontenacs moved late-season from the Kingston Memorial Centre to the new K-Rock Centre, which opened on February 22, 2008. On the afternoon of February 18, 2008, Windsor Spitfires team captain Mickey Renaud died after collapsing at his home, at age 19, of the rare heart condition hypertrophic cardiomyopathy. The playoffs began March 20, with the Kitchener Rangers winning the J. Ross Robertson Cup as OHL champions. The Rangers were also chosen before the start of the season to host the 2008 Memorial Cup tournament.

== Regular season ==
=== Final standings ===
Note: DIV = Division; GP = Games played; W = Wins; L = Losses; OTL = Overtime losses; SL = Shootout losses; GF = Goals for; GA = Goals against; PTS = Points; x = clinched playoff berth; y = clinched division title; z = clinched conference title

=== Eastern conference ===
Rank	Team	DIV	GP	W	L	OTL	SL	PTS	GF	GA
1	z-Belleville Bulls	East	68	48	14	4	2	102	280	175
2	y-Brampton Battalion	Central	68	42	22	1	3	88	259	187
3	x-Oshawa Generals	East	68	38	17	6	7	89	290	262
4	x-Niagara IceDogs	Central	68	42	25	0	1	85	272	222
5	x-Mississauga St. Michael's Majors	Central	68	31	32	2	3	67	203	243
6	x-Ottawa 67's	East	68	29	34	2	3	63	201	237
7	x-Barrie Colts	Central	68	28	34	3	3	62	185	223
8	x-Peterborough Petes	East	68	28	36	1	3	60	199	250
9	Kingston Frontenacs	East	68	25	41	0	2	52	227	312
10	Sudbury Wolves	Central	68	17	46	2	3	39	175	292

=== Western conference ===
Rank	Team	DIV	GP	W	L	OTL	SL	PTS	GF	GA
1	z-Kitchener Rangers	Midwest	68	53	11	1	3	110	289	174
2	y-Sault Ste. Marie Greyhounds	West	68	44	18	2	4	94	247	173
3	x-Windsor Spitfires	West	68	41	15	7	5	94	279	205
4	x-London Knights	Midwest	68	38	24	4	2	82	250	230
5	x-Guelph Storm	Midwest	68	34	25	5	4	77	213	187
6	x-Sarnia Sting	West	68	37	29	2	0	76	251	229
7	x-Saginaw Spirit	West	68	33	25	8	2	76	234	231
8	x-Plymouth Whalers	West	68	34	28	2	4	74	228	223
9	Owen Sound Attack	Midwest	68	20	41	2	5	47	200	290
10	Erie Otters	Midwest	68	18	46	2	2	40	206	343

== Scoring leaders ==
Note: GP = Games played; G = Goals; A = Assists; Pts = Points; PIM = Penalty minutes

Player	Team	GP	G	A	Pts	PIM
Justin Azevedo	Kitchener Rangers	67	43	81	124	69
Brett MacLean	Oshawa Generals	61	61	58	119	42
John Tavares	Oshawa Generals	59	40	78	118	69
Luca Caputi	Niagara IceDogs	66	51	60	111	107
Steven Stamkos	Sarnia Sting	61	58	47	105	88
Chris Terry	Plymouth Whalers	68	44	57	101	107
Jack Combs	Saginaw Spirit	67	42	58	100	93
Michael Swift	Niagara IceDogs	68	38	62	100	130
Dustin Jeffrey	Sault Ste. Marie Greyhounds	56	38	59	97	30
Josh Bailey	Windsor Spitfires	67	29	67	96	32

== Leading goaltenders ==
Note: GP = Games played; Mins = Minutes played; W = Wins; L = Losses: OTL = Overtime losses; SL = Shootout losses; GA = Goals Allowed; SO = Shutouts; GAA = Goals against average

Player	Team	GP	Mins	W	L	OTL	SL	GA	SO	Sv%	GAA
Mike Murphy	Belleville Bulls	49	2942	36	7	3	1	110	3	0.929	2.24
Kyle Gajewski	Sault Ste. Marie Greyhounds	60	3562	39	16	1	3	145	3	0.913	2.44
Josh Unice	Kitchener Rangers	42	2376	30	6	1	2	97	4	0.908	2.45
Tom McCollum	Guelph Storm	51	2978	25	17	3	3	124	4	0.914	2.50
Steve Mason	London / Kitchener	42	2530	32	7	1	2	106	3	0.916	2.51

== Playoffs ==
Conference quarterfinals	Conference semifinals
1	Belleville	4
8	Peterborough	1
1	Belleville	4
7	Barrie	0
2	Brampton	1
7	Barrie	4
Eastern
3	Oshawa	4
6	Ottawa	0
3	Oshawa	4
4	Niagara	2
4	Niagara	4
5	Mississauga	0
1	Kitchener	4
8	Plymouth	0
1	Kitchener	4
6	Sarnia	0
3	Windsor	1
6	Sarnia	4
Western
2	Sault Ste. Marie	4
7	Saginaw	0
2	Sault Ste. Marie	4
5	Guelph	1
4	London	1
5	Guelph	4

Conference finals
1	Belleville	4
3	Oshawa	1
1	Kitchener	4
2	Sault Ste. Marie	1

OHL championship
E1	Belleville	3
W1	Kitchener	4

=== Conference quarterfinals ===
==== (1) Belleville Bulls vs. (8) Peterborough Petes ====
March 19	Belleville Bulls	4 – 1	Peterborough Petes	Yardmen Arena
5:58 - pp - Andrew Self (1); 8:31 - Stephen Johnston (1); 13:52 - Nigel Williams (1)		First period	No scoring
No scoring		Second period	Branislav Rehuš (1) - pp - 16:37
19:59 - en - P.K. Subban (1)		Third period	No scoring
Mike Murphy (25 saves / 26 shots)		Goalie stats	Trevor Cann (29 saves / 32 shots)

March 20	Peterborough Petes	5 – 4	OT	Belleville Bulls	Peterborough Memorial Centre
Brett Theberge (1) - 4:47; Zack Kassian (1) - pp - 6:40		First period		16:46 - Cory Tanaka (1)
Kenzie Sheppard (1) - 2:35		Second period		17:39 - pp - Matt Beleskey (1)
Justin Soryal (1) - 5:50		Third period		11:19 - P.K. Subban (2); 17:39 - Jan Muršak (1)
Brett Theberge (2) - pp - 11:03		First overtime period		No scoring
Trevor Cann (51 saves / 55 shots)		Goalie stats		Mike Murphy (33 saves / 38 shots)

March 22	Belleville Bulls	4 – 3	Peterborough Petes	Yardmen Arena
Keaton Turkiewicz (1) - 10:43; Bryan Cameron (1) - 11:28		First period	13:26 - sh - Artūrs Kulda (1)
Adam Perry (1) - 4:50		Second period	8:09 - sh - Yves Bastien (1)
Matt Beleskey (2) - pp - 9:12		Third period	6:15 - pp - Kenzie Sheppard (2)
Mike Murphy (29 saves / 32 shots)		Goalie stats	Trevor Cann (45 saves / 49 shots)

March 24	Peterborough Petes	2 – 3	OT	Belleville Bulls	Peterborough Memorial Centre
No scoring		First period		Jan Muršak (2) - pp - 7:58
1:29 - Zach Harnden (1)		Second period		Nigel Williams (2) - sh - 15:18
19:28 - Justin Soryal (2)		Third period		No scoring
No scoring		First overtime period		P.K. Subban (3) - 6:24
Trevor Cann (45 saves / 48 shots)		Goalie stats		Mike Murphy (32 saves / 34 shots)

March 25	Peterborough Petes	1 – 7	Belleville Bulls	Peterborough Memorial Centre
Yves Bastien (2) - 3:40		First period	6:16 - Matthew Tipoff (1); 14:55 - Stephen Johnston (2)
No scoring		Second period	6:39 - pp - Jan Muršak (3)
No scoring		Third period	11:39 - Andrew Self (2); 12:09 - Stephen Johnston (3); 18:04 - pp - Nigel Williams (3); 18:23 - Bryan Cameron (2)
Trevor Cann (24 saves / 31 shots)		Goalie stats	Mike Murphy (31 saves / 32 shots)

Belleville wins series 4 – 1

==== (2) Brampton Battalion vs. (7) Barrie Colts ====
March 20	Brampton Battalion	1 – 3	Barrie Colts	Powerade Centre
No scoring		First period	No scoring
0:40 - pp - Cody Hodgson (1)		Second period	Stefan Della Rovere (1) - pp - 6:52
No scoring		Third period	Tomáš Marcinko (1) - 14:22; Tomáš Marcinko (2) - en - 19:29
Bryan Pitton (25 saves / 27 shots)		Goalie stats	Michael Hutchinson (31 saves / 32 shots)

March 22	Barrie Colts	3 – 2	OT	Brampton Battalion	Barrie Molson Centre
Shawn Frank (1) - 10:13		First period		No scoring
Daniel Michalsky (1) - 18:58		Second period		16:36 - Cody Hodgson (2)
Daniel Michalsky (2) - 13:35		Third period		16:44 - Thomas Stajan (1)
Michael Hutchinson (49 saves / 51 shots)		Goalie stats		Bryan Pitton (36 saves / 39 shots)

March 23	Brampton Battalion	5 – 1	Barrie Colts	Powerade Centre
Bobby Sanguinetti (1) - pp - 16:24		First period	No scoring
John Hughes (1) - 4:06		Second period	4:49 - Marcus Pepe (1)
Matt Duchene (1) - 16:44; Cody Hodgson (3) - sh - en - 18:46; Cody Hodgson (4) - 19:42		Third period	No scoring
Bryan Pitton (31 saves / 32 shots)		Goalie stats	Michael Hutchinson (45 saves / 48 shots)

March 25	Barrie Colts	2 – 1	OT	Brampton Battalion	Barrie Molson Centre
No scoring		First period		Cody Hodgson (5) - 3:00
12:02 - Ryan Gottschalk (1)		Second period		No scoring
No scoring		Third period		No scoring
19:50 - Daniel Michalsky (3)		First overtime period		No scoring
Michael Hutchinson (62 saves / 63 shots)		Goalie stats		Bryan Pitton (29 saves / 31 shots)

March 27	Brampton Battalion	0 – 2	Barrie Colts	Powerade Centre
No scoring		First period	No scoring
No scoring		Second period	No scoring
No scoring		Third period	Shawn Frank (2) - 5:37; Colt Kennedy (1) - 6:24
Bryan Pitton (29 saves / 31 shots)		Goalie stats	Michael Hutchinson (34 saves / 34 shots)

Barrie wins series 4 – 1

==== (3) Oshawa Generals vs. (6) Ottawa 67's ====
March 21	Oshawa Generals	3 – 2	Ottawa 67's	General Motors Centre
1:24 - Michael Del Zotto (1)		First period	No scoring
12:19 - Dale Mitchell (1)		Second period	No scoring
4:53 - Brett MacLean (1)		Third period	Jamie McGinn (1) - pp - 0:40; Mathieu Méthot (1) - 10:19
Michal Neuvirth (33 saves / 35 shots)		Goalie stats	Adam Courchaine (22 saves / 25 shots)

March 23	Oshawa Generals	5 – 2	Ottawa 67's	General Motors Centre
1:13 - Brett Parnham (1); 19:34 - pp - Patrick Asselin (1)		First period	No scoring
4:44 - Michael Del Zotto (2); 8:47 - John Tavares (1)		Second period	Logan Couture (1) - pp - 19:04
15:05 - Corey Cowick (1)		Third period	Tyler Cuma (1) - pp - 9:59
Michal Neuvirth (29 saves / 31 shots)		Goalie stats	Adam Courchaine (12 saves / 16 shots); Chris Perugini (14 saves / 15 shots)

March 25	Ottawa 67's	1 – 2	Oshawa Generals	Ottawa Civic Centre
No scoring		First period	No scoring
No scoring		Second period	Brett Parnham (2) - 2:18; James DeLory (1) - pp - 13:32
18:58 - pp - Jamie McGinn (2)		Third period	No scoring
Adam Courchaine (22 saves / 24 shots)		Goalie stats	Michal Neuvirth (46 saves / 47 shots)

March 27	Ottawa 67's	1 – 4	Oshawa Generals	Ottawa Civic Centre
No scoring		First period	John Tavares (2) - 5:26; Dale Mitchell (2) - 7:58; Ryan McGinnis (1) - pp - 9:55
16:52 - Logan Couture (2)		Second period	No scoring
No scoring		Third period	Kory Nagy (1) - 18:26
Adam Courchaine (2 saves / 5 shots); Chris Perugini (26 saves / 27 shots)		Goalie stats	Michal Neuvirth (34 saves / 35 shots)

Oshawa wins series 4 – 0

==== (4) Niagara IceDogs vs. (5) Mississauga St. Michael's Majors ====
March 20	Niagara IceDogs	4 – 0	Mississauga St. Michael's Majors	Gatorade Garden City Complex
No scoring		First period	No scoring
1:59 - Barry Sanderson (1); 8:36 - pp - Stefan Legein (1); 12:08 - sh - Michael Swift (1)		Second period	No scoring
11:26 - pp - Michael Swift (2)		Third period	No scoring
Sebastian Dahm (29 saves / 29 shots)		Goalie stats	Chris Carrozzi (31 saves / 35 shots)

March 21	Mississauga St. Michael's Majors	1 – 3	Niagara IceDogs	Hershey Centre
Kaspars Daugaviņš (1) - pp - 9:05		First period	13:21 - pp - Alex Pietrangelo (1)
No scoring		Second period	12:58 - Alex Pietrangelo (2); 19:43 - sh - Stefan Legein (2)
No scoring		Third period	No scoring
Chris Carrozzi (21 saves / 24 shots)		Goalie stats	Sebastian Dahm (32 saves / 33 shots)

March 23	Niagara IceDogs	5 – 0	Mississauga St. Michael's Majors	Gatorade Garden City Complex
Chris DeSousa (1) - pp - 11:02		First period	No scoring
No scoring		Second period	No scoring
Jordan Foreman (1) - pp - 0:43; Luca Caputi (1) - 5:34; Michael Swift (3) - pp - 7:46; Alex Pietrangelo (3) - 13:00		Third period	No scoring
Sebastian Dahm (33 saves / 33 shots)		Goalie stats	Chris Carrozzi (34 saves / 39 shots)

March 25	Mississauga St. Michael's Majors	3 – 6	Niagara IceDogs	Hershey Centre
17:34 - pp - Michael Pelech (1); 18:16 - Kaspars Daugaviņš (2)		First period	No scoring
No scoring		Second period	Alex Pietrangelo (4) - 1:30; Chris DeSousa (2) - 1:59; Stefan Legein (3) - sh - ps - 17:49
18:32 - pp - Casey Cizikas (1)		Third period	Luca Caputi (2) - pp - 4:15; Andrew Merrett (1) - 10:20; Stefan Legein (4) - sh - 15:02
Chris Carrozzi (21 saves / 27 shots)		Goalie stats	Sebastian Dahm (30 saves / 33 shots)

Niagara wins series 4 – 0

* Note: Game 3 was played at Jack Gatecliff Arena.

==== (1) Kitchener Rangers vs. (8) Plymouth Whalers ====
March 21	Kitchener Rangers	9 – 2	Plymouth Whalers	Kitchener Memorial Auditorium
3:05 - Matthew Halischuk (1); 6:43 - Ben Shutron (1); 8:01 - pp - Yannick Weber (1); 17:18 - pp - Yannick Weber (2)		First period	Chris Terry (1) - pp - 12:20
8:48 - pp - Matthew Halischuk (2); 16:41 - pp - Nick Spaling (1); 18:38 - pp - Nick Spaling (2); 19:37 - Nazem Kadri (1)		Second period	No scoring
6:16 - Nick Spaling (3)		Third period	Patrick Lee (1) - 14:39
Steve Mason (25 saves / 27 shots)		Goalie stats	Jeremy Smith (38 saves / 47 shots)

March 22	Plymouth Whalers	4 – 6	Kitchener Rangers	Compuware Arena
Chris Terry (2) - 8:14		First period	14:36 - pp - Yannick Weber (3); 15:47 - Nazem Kadri (2)
A.J. Jenks (1) - pp - 15:16		Second period	9:14 - ps - Matthew Halischuk (3); 18:13 - Mike Duco (1)
Christian Steingraber (1) - 8:23; Patrick Lee (2) - pp - 9:04		Third period	3:37 - Yannick Weber (4); 4:01 - Nazem Kadri (3)
Jeremy Smith (22 saves / 28 shots); Matt Hackett (10 saves / 10 shots)		Goalie stats	Steve Mason (36 saves / 40 shots)

March 24	Kitchener Rangers	7 – 3	Plymouth Whalers	Kitchener Memorial Auditorium
Mike Duco (2) - 11:18; Mikkel Bødker (1) - pp - 15:18		First period	No scoring
Nazem Kadri (4) - 5:42; Matthew Halischuk (4) - pp - 8:15		Second period	0:22 - Joe McCann (1); 9:04 - pp - Chris Terry (3)
Matthew Halischuk (5) - pp - 5:42; Justin Azevedo (1) - 18:38; Mike Mascioli (1) - pp - 19:00		Third period	9:42 - pp - Chris Terry (4)
Josh Unice (20 saves / 23 shots)		Goalie stats	Jeremy Smith (25 saves / 32 shots)

March 26	Plymouth Whalers	4 – 7	Kitchener Rangers	Compuware Arena
12:55 - Jordon O'Neill (1)		First period	Mikkel Bødker (2) - pp - 1:57; Scott Timmins (1) - 3:00
13:17 - pp - Patrick Lee (3)		Second period	Matthew Halischuk (6) - sh - ps - 8:19; Nick Spaling (4) - 15:40
0:12 - Tyler Brown (1); 8:45 - pp - Andrew Fournier (1)		Third period	Ben Shutron (2) - 0:58; Mike Duco (3) - 15:09; Scott Tregunna (1) - 15:47
Jeremy Smith (48 saves / 55 shots)		Goalie stats	Josh Unice (32 saves / 36 shots)

Kitchener wins series 4 – 0

==== (2) Sault Ste. Marie Greyhounds vs. (7) Saginaw Spirit ====
March 21	Sault Ste. Marie Greyhounds	5 – 4	Saginaw Spirit	Steelback Centre
1:38 - Jacob Lalonde (1); 11:50 - Matt Caria (1); 18:05 - Matt Caria (2)		First period	Garrett Sinfield (1) - pp - 3:51; Kyle Tront (1) - 17:18
No scoring		Second period	No scoring
1:38 - pp - Josh Godfrey (1); 14:11 - Matthew Lyall (1)		Third period	Ryan McDonough (1) - pp - 9:36; Ryan McDonough (2) - 19:24
Kyle Gajewski (22 saves / 26 shots)		Goalie stats	Ryan Daniels (34 saves / 39 shots)

March 24	Sault Ste. Marie Greyhounds	2 – 1	Saginaw Spirit	Steelback Centre
4:30 - Dustin Jeffrey (1); 14:37 - pp - Josh Godfrey (2)		First period	Chris Chappell (1) - 19:58
No scoring		Second period	No scoring
No scoring		Third period	No scoring
Kyle Gajewski (19 saves / 20 shots)		Goalie stats	Ryan Daniels (32 saves / 34 shots)

March 26	Saginaw Spirit	2 – 6	Sault Ste. Marie Greyhounds	Dow Event Center
No scoring		First period	Matt Caria (3) - pp - 1:41; James Livingston (1) - 11:45; Josh Godfrey (3) - 17:50
18:35 - pp - Tomáš Záborský (1)		Second period	Wayne Simmonds (1) - 2:16; James Livingston (2) - 12:46
12:52 - pp - Tomáš Záborský (2)		Third period	Anthony Peluso (1) - pp - 14:29
Ryan Daniels (12 saves / 16 shots); Edward Pasquale (13 saves / 15 shots)		Goalie stats	Kyle Gajewski (29 saves / 31 shots)

March 27	Saginaw Spirit	2 – 4	Sault Ste. Marie Greyhounds	Dow Event Center
10:09 - Chris Chappell (2)		First period	Anthony Peluso (2) - 14:03; Brandon Biggers (1) - 15:45
11:49 - Nick Crawford (1)		Second period	Wayne Simmonds (2) - 18:56
No scoring		Third period	Dustin Jeffrey (2) - en - 19:55
Edward Pasquale (28 saves / 31 shots)		Goalie stats	Kyle Gajewski (32 saves / 34 shots)

Sault Ste. Marie wins series 4 – 0

==== (3) Windsor Spitfires vs. (6) Sarnia Sting ====
March 20	Windsor Spitfires	0 – 3	Sarnia Sting	Windsor Arena
No scoring		First period	Steven Stamkos (1) - 5:32; Jared Gomes (1) - 11:15; Steven Stamkos (2) - 14:23
No scoring		Second period	No scoring
No scoring		Third period	No scoring
Jakub Kovář (26 saves / 29 shots)		Goalie stats	Andrew Perugini (31 saves / 31 shots)

March 21	Sarnia Sting	5 – 2	Windsor Spitfires	Sarnia Sports and Entertainment Centre
Jamie Arniel (1) - pp - 12:26		First period	No scoring
Jared Gomes (2) - 5:39; Steven Stamkos (3) - 14:59; Steven Stamkos (4) - pp - 18:34		Second period	No scoring
Justin DiBenedetto (1) - pp - 5:07		Third period	6:40 - Jordan Nolan (1); 10:58 - pp - Ryan Ellis (1)
Andrew Perugini (37 saves / 39 shots)		Goalie stats	Jakub Kovář (28 saves / 32 shots); Andrew Engelage (11 saves / 12 shots)

March 23	Windsor Spitfires	4 – 2	Sarnia Sting	Windsor Arena
No scoring		First period	3:10 - pp - Matt Martin (1)
Adam Henrique (1) - 4:58; Jordan Nolan (2) - 15:52		Second period	11:23 - sh - Steven Stamkos (5)
Greg Nemisz (1) - pp - 10:57; Taylor Hall (1) - pp - 12:00		Third period	No scoring
Jakub Kovář (19 saves / 21 shots)		Goalie stats	Andrew Perugini (62 saves / 66 shots)

March 25	Sarnia Sting	5 – 4	Windsor Spitfires	Sarnia Sports and Entertainment Centre
1:31 - Steven Stamkos (6); 9:23 - pp - Steven Stamkos (7)		First period	Jordan Nolan (3) - 5:17
1:31 - pp - Steven Stamkos (8); 7:53 - pp - Steven Stamkos (9); 16:42 - Matt Martin (2)		Second period	Adam Henrique (2) - 14:12
No scoring		Third period	Josh Bailey (1) - pp - 3:16; Greg Nemisz (2) - 18:54
Andrew Perugini (34 saves / 38 shots)		Goalie stats	Jakub Kovář (16 saves / 20 shots); Andrew Engelage (13 saves / 14 shots)

March 27	Windsor Spitfires	3 – 4	OT	Sarnia Sting	Windsor Arena
11:24 - pp - Ryan Ellis (2)		First period		Justin DiBenedetto (2) - 6:23
1:24 - Taylor Hall (2)		Second period		Jared Gomes (3) - 2:37; Matt Martin (3) - 19:18
3:14 - pp - Elgin Reid (1)		Third period		No scoring
No scoring		First overtime period		Devin DiDiomete (1) - 17:21
Andrew Engelage (43 saves / 47 shots)		Goalie stats		Andrew Perugini (51 saves / 54 shots)

Sarnia wins series 4 – 1

==== (4) London Knights vs. (5) Guelph Storm ====
March 21	London Knights	2 – 3	OT	Guelph Storm	John Labatt Centre
No scoring		First period		No scoring
1:12 - Jadran Beljo (1)		Second period		Stephen Miller (1) - 9:09
19:33 - Akim Aliu (1)		Third period		Brandon Buck (1) - pp - 13:02
No scoring		First overtime period		Drew Doughty (1) - 0:34
Jhase Sniderman (26 saves / 29 shots)		Goalie stats		Tom McCollum (36 saves / 38 shots)

March 22	Guelph Storm	4 – 1	London Knights	Sleeman Centre
No scoring		First period	9:25 - Steven Tarasuk (1)
Drew Doughty (2) - 3:42; Rafael Rotter (1) - pp - 8:44		Second period	No scoring
Michael Caruso (1) - 6:26; Anthony Nigro (1) - sh - en - 16:20		Third period	No scoring
Tom McCollum (24 saves / 25 shots)		Goalie stats	Jhase Sniderman (33 saves / 36 shots)

March 25	London Knights	3 – 5	Guelph Storm	John Labatt Centre
Phil Varone (1) - 7:42		First period	2:22 - Denis Hollenstein (1); 17:05 - sh - Matt Kennedy (1)
Jadran Beljo (2) - 14:17		Second period	17:16 - Derek Brochu (1)
Daniel Erlich (1) - 10:08		Third period	13:57 - pp - Rafael Rotter (2); 19:35 - en - Brandon Buck (2)
Jhase Sniderman (14 saves / 16 shots); Jason Guy (14 saves / 16 shots)		Goalie stats	Tom McCollum (36 saves / 39 shots)

March 27	Guelph Storm	1 – 2	London Knights	Sleeman Centre
No scoring		First period	No scoring
No scoring		Second period	No scoring
0:38 - pp - Harrison Reed (1)		Third period	Tony Romano (1) - 17:14; Akim Aliu (2) - pp - 18:40
Tom McCollum (24 saves / 26 shots)		Goalie stats	Jason Guy (27 saves / 28 shots)

March 28	London Knights	0 – 5	Guelph Storm	John Labatt Centre
No scoring		First period	Brandon Buck (3) - 0:43; Anthony Nigro (2) - 16:23
No scoring		Second period	Corey Syvret (1) - 4:44; Harrison Reed (2) - 12:52; Matt Kennedy (2) - pp - 19:28
No scoring		Third period	No scoring
Jason Guy (27 saves / 32 shots)		Goalie stats	Tom McCollum (31 saves / 31 shots)

Guelph wins series 4 – 1

=== Conference semifinals ===
==== (1) Belleville Bulls vs. (7) Barrie Colts ====
April 2	Belleville Bulls	7 – 2	Barrie Colts	Yardmen Arena
12:26 - Cory Tanaka (2); 16:03 - Jan Muršak (4)		First period	No scoring
18:13 - pp - Matt Beleskey (3)		Second period	No scoring
3:34 - pp - Nigel Williams (4); 4:03 - Stephen Johnston (4); 7:22 - P.K. Subban (4); 12:57 - Keaton Turkiewicz (2)		Third period	Ryan Gottschalk (2) - 6:18; Tomáš Marcinko (3) - 15:48
Mike Murphy (28 saves / 30 shots)		Goalie stats	Michael Hutchinson (50 saves / 56 shots); Peter Di Salvo (5 saves / 6 shots)

April 3	Barrie Colts	1 – 5	Belleville Bulls	Barrie Molson Centre
No scoring		First period	12:56 - pp - Eric Tangradi (1)
Tomáš Marcinko (4) - pp - 15:35		Second period	9:43 - Keaton Turkiewicz (3)
No scoring		Third period	1:09 - Cory Tanaka (3); 10:50 - sh - Jan Muršak (5); 13:07 - pp - P.K. Subban (5)
Michael Hutchinson (32 saves / 37 shots)		Goalie stats	Mike Murphy (30 saves / 31 shots)

April 5	Belleville Bulls	2 – 1	Barrie Colts	Yardmen Arena
Matt Beleskey (4) - pp - 10:08		First period	2:28 - pp - Cory McGillis (1)
Eric Tangradi (2) - 16:53		Second period	No scoring
No scoring		Third period	No scoring
Mike Murphy (26 saves / 27 shots)		Goalie stats	Peter Di Salvo (32 saves / 34 shots)

April 8	Barrie Colts	2 – 3	Belleville Bulls	Barrie Molson Centre
No scoring		First period	No scoring
1:18 - pp - Ryan Berard (1); 2:39 - Tyson Aitcheson (1)		Second period	Bryan Cameron (3) - pp - 18:01; Andrew Self (3) - pp - 18:23
No scoring		Third period	P.K. Subban (6) - pp - 0:26
Michael Hutchinson (45 saves / 48 shots)		Goalie stats	Mike Murphy (20 saves / 22 shots)

Belleville wins series 4 – 0

==== (3) Oshawa Generals vs. (4) Niagara IceDogs ====
April 3	Oshawa Generals	6 – 1	Niagara IceDogs	General Motors Centre
6:59 - Brett MacLean (2); 15:41 - Dale Mitchell (3)		First period	No scoring
8:03 - pp - Brett Parnham (3); 11:29 - John Tavares (3)		Second period	No scoring
10:10 - pp - Brett Parnham (4); 13:07 - pp - Patrick Asselin (2)		Third period	Alex Pietrangelo (5) - pp - 6:54
Michal Neuvirth (40 saves / 41 shots)		Goalie stats	Sebastian Dahm (34 saves / 40 shots)

April 5	Niagara IceDogs	5 – 3	Oshawa Generals	Jack Gatecliff Arena
Stefan Legein (5) - pp - 11:12; Drew Schiestel (1) - pp - 11:34		First period	5:04 - pp - Patrick Asselin (3); 6:10 - Kevin Baker (1); 6:30 - Kory Nagy (2)
Luca Caputi (3) - 9:30; Michael Swift (4) - sh - 12:05		Second period	No scoring
Stefan Legein (6) - en - 19:25		Third period	No scoring
Sebastian Dahm (42 saves / 45 shots)		Goalie stats	Michal Neuvirth (33 saves / 37 shots)

April 6	Oshawa Generals	4 – 1	Niagara IceDogs	General Motors Centre
Eric Regan (1) - pp - 19:31; Kevin Baker (2) - 19:47		First period	No scoring
No scoring		Second period	0:55 - pp - Jordan Foreman (2)
Ryan McGinnis (2) - pp - 7:11; Kory Nagy (3) - 18:28		Third period	No scoring
Michal Neuvirth (30 saves / 31 shots)		Goalie stats	Sebastian Dahm (34 saves / 38 shots)

April 8	Niagara IceDogs	4 – 6	Oshawa Generals	Jack Gatecliff Arena
No scoring		First period	Patrick Asselin (4) - pp - 7:00; Dale Mitchell (4) - 18:03
0:21 - Luca Caputi (4); 1:53 - sh - Michael Swift (5); 2:46 - Michael Swift (6)		Second period	Kory Nagy (4) - 6:14; Brett MacLean (3) - 15:51; Kory Nagy (5) - sh - 19:00
3:18 - Michael Swift (7)		Third period	Brett MacLean (4) - en - 18:55
Sebastian Dahm (42 saves / 47 shots)		Goalie stats	Michal Neuvirth (34 saves / 38 shots)

April 11	Oshawa Generals	3 – 8	Niagara IceDogs	General Motors Centre
6:17 - Jonathan Sciacca (1); 9:19 - Kevin Baker (3)		First period	Jordan Foreman (3) - 3:28; Chris DeSousa (3) - 3:38; Luca Caputi (5) - 16:51
3:39 - Kevin Baker (4)		Second period	Luca Caputi (6) - pp - 0:54; Luca Caputi (7) - sh - 7:10; Michael Swift (8) - 15:44
No scoring		Third period	Stefan Legein (7) - 11:14; Jordan Foreman (4) - 13:15
Michal Neuvirth (11 saves / 16 shots); Daryl Borden (5 saves / 8 shots)		Goalie stats	Sebastian Dahm (41 saves / 44 shots)

April 13	Niagara IceDogs	2 – 5	Oshawa Generals	Jack Gatecliff Arena
7:04 - Luca Caputi (8); 19:25 - pp - Michael Swift (9)		First period	Dale Mitchell (5) - pp - 5:23; Patrick Asselin (5) - pp - 14:10
No scoring		Second period	Dale Mitchell (6) - 6:12
No scoring		Third period	Dale Mitchell (7) - pp - 4:21; Patrick Asselin (6) - en - 19:14
Sebastian Dahm (40 saves / 44 shots)		Goalie stats	Daryl Borden (43 saves / 45 shots)

Oshawa wins series 4 – 2

==== (1) Kitchener Rangers vs. (6) Sarnia Sting ====
April 4	Kitchener Rangers	3 – 0	Sarnia Sting	Kitchener Memorial Auditorium
12:58 - Mike Mascioli (2)		First period	No scoring
14:37 - T.J. Battani (1)		Second period	No scoring
6:17 - pp - Mike Duco (4)		Third period	No scoring
Steve Mason (38 saves / 38 shots)		Goalie stats	Andrew Perugini (41 saves / 44 shots)

April 5	Sarnia Sting	2 – 3	3OT	Kitchener Rangers	Sarnia Sports and Entertainment Centre
No scoring		First period		3:49 - Mikkel Bødker (3)
No scoring		Second period		0:51 - pp - Mikkel Bødker (4)
Steven Stamkos (10) - pp - 10:05; Steven Stamkos (11) - 13:11		Third period		No scoring
No scoring		Third overtime period		11:30 - Mike Duco (5)
Andrew Perugini (64 saves / 67 shots)		Goalie stats		Steve Mason (62 saves / 64 shots)

April 8	Kitchener Rangers	6 – 2	Sarnia Sting	Kitchener Memorial Auditorium
Justin Azevedo (2) - 0:32; Matthew Halischuk (7) - 2:14; Matthew Halischuk (8) - pp - 17:38		First period	3:24 - Jamie Arniel (2); 6:01 - Steve Reese (1)
Mikkel Bødker (5) - 2:30; Matt Pepe (1) - 14:14		Second period	No scoring
Nick Spaling (5) - pp - 9:55		Third period	No scoring
Steve Mason (14 saves / 16 shots); Josh Unice (9 saves / 9 shots)		Goalie stats	Andrew Perugini (33 saves / 39 shots)

April 9	Sarnia Sting	2 – 6	Kitchener Rangers	Sarnia Sports and Entertainment Centre
15:05 - pp - Vladimir Nikiforov (1)		First period	Mike Duco (6) - pp - 3:47
No scoring		Second period	Mike Duco (7) - 11:39; Mike Duco (8) - pp - 15:52; Matthew Halischuk (9) - 18:13
15:15 - pp - Justin DiBenedetto (3)		Third period	Justin Azevedo (3) - pp - 11:32; Justin Azevedo (4) - en - 17:17
Andrew Perugini (35 saves / 40 shots)		Goalie stats	Josh Unice (25 saves / 27 shots)

Kitchener wins series 4 – 0

==== (2) Sault Ste. Marie Greyhounds vs. (5) Guelph Storm ====
April 3	Sault Ste. Marie Greyhounds	1 – 4	Guelph Storm	Steelback Centre
11:06 - Michael Fine (1)		First period	No scoring
No scoring		Second period	No scoring
No scoring		Third period	Drew Doughty (3) - pp - 4:43; Corey Syvret (2) - 11:42; Denis Hollenstein (2) - 12:43; Harrison Reed (3) - en - 19:28
Kyle Gajewski (35 saves / 38 shots)		Goalie stats	Tom McCollum (25 saves / 26 shots)

April 4	Sault Ste. Marie Greyhounds	3 – 1	Guelph Storm	Steelback Centre
No scoring		First period	No scoring
6:07 - pp - Josh Godfrey (4)		Second period	No scoring
18:50 - en - Brandon MacLean (1); 19:33 - en - Brandon MacLean (2)		Third period	Michael Caruso (2) - 19:59
Kyle Gajewski (24 saves / 25 shots)		Goalie stats	Tom McCollum (28 saves / 29 shots)

April 7	Guelph Storm	1 – 2	Sault Ste. Marie Greyhounds	Sleeman Centre
No scoring		First period	No scoring
18:46 - pp - Brandon Buck (4)		Second period	Dustin Jeffrey (3) - 4:02; Arron Alphonso (1) - 14:15
No scoring		Third period	No scoring
Tom McCollum (31 saves / 33 shots)		Goalie stats	Kyle Gajewski (34 saves / 35 shots)

April 8	Guelph Storm	2 – 3	Sault Ste. Marie Greyhounds	Sleeman Centre
19:44 - Brandon Buck (5)		First period	Matthew Lyall (2) - 10:43; Wayne Simmonds (3) - 15:27
No scoring		Second period	No scoring
9:00 - Rafael Rotter (3)		Third period	Andrew Campbell (1) - 16:22
Tom McCollum (26 saves / 29 shots)		Goalie stats	Kyle Gajewski (27 saves / 29 shots)

April 10	Sault Ste. Marie Greyhounds	4 – 1	Guelph Storm	Steelback Centre
9:56 - Matt Caria (4)		First period	Matt Kennedy (3) - 4:44
14:33 - Brandon MacLean (3); 16:16 - Wayne Simmonds (4)		Second period	No scoring
10:38 - Matt Caria (5)		Third period	No scoring
Kyle Gajewski (27 saves / 28 shots)		Goalie stats	Tom McCollum (21 saves / 25 shots)

Sault Ste. Marie wins series 4 – 1

=== Conference finals ===
==== (1) Belleville Bulls vs. (3) Oshawa Generals ====
April 16	Belleville Bulls	3 – 2	Oshawa Generals	Yardmen Arena
0:28 - Adam Perry (2); 8:48 - sh - Cory Tanaka (4)		First period	Brett Parnham (5) - 1:42
12:39 - pp - Adam Perry (3)		Second period	Brett MacLean (5) - 17:38
No scoring		Third period	No scoring
Mike Murphy (27 saves / 29 shots)		Goalie stats	Daryl Borden (45 saves / 48 shots)

April 18	Oshawa Generals	3 – 4	Belleville Bulls	General Motors Centre
0:45 - Dale Mitchell (8); 1:31 - Dale Mitchell (9); 3:56 - pp - Brett Parnham (6)		First period	No scoring
No scoring		Second period	Adam Perry (4) - 1:51; Eric Tangradi (3) - 6:47; Shawn Lalonde (1) - 11:09; Matt Beleskey (5) - 13:23
No scoring		Third period	No scoring
Daryl Borden (44 saves / 48 shots)		Goalie stats	Mike Murphy (2 saves / 5 shots); Parker Van Buskirk (28 saves / 28 shots)

April 19	Belleville Bulls	5 – 2	Oshawa Generals	Yardmen Arena
Nigel Williams (5) - 11:59; Jan Muršak (6) - 15:46; Bryan Cameron (4) - pp - 19:03		First period	12:52 - Patrick Asselin (7); 15:40 - Kory Nagy (6)
No scoring		Second period	No scoring
Andrew Self (4) - pp - 3:27; Cory Tanaka (5) - ps - 13:39		Third period	No scoring
Mike Murphy (32 saves / 34 shots)		Goalie stats	Daryl Borden (38 saves / 43 shots)

April 21	Oshawa Generals	2 – 1	Belleville Bulls	General Motors Centre
17:34 - Dale Mitchell (10)		First period	Jan Muršak (7) - pp - 6:10
No scoring		Second period	No scoring
6:44 - Brett Parnham (7)		Third period	No scoring
Daryl Borden (32 saves / 33 shots)		Goalie stats	Mike Murphy (29 saves / 31 shots)

April 23	Belleville Bulls	11 – 0	Oshawa Generals	Yardmen Arena
4:24 - Cory Tanaka (6); 17:33 - pp - Adam Perry (5); 19:18 - pp - Adam Perry (6)		First period	No scoring
2:19 - Shawn Lalonde (2); 7:21 - pp - Jan Muršak (8); 10:04 - pp - Matt Beleskey (6); 14:26 - Keaton Turkiewicz (4); 16:46 - Matt Beleskey (7)		Second period	No scoring
9:24 - Matt Beleskey (8); 11:34 - pp - Andrew Self (5); 14:24 - pp - Stephen Blunden (1)		Third period	No scoring
Mike Murphy (28 saves / 28 shots)		Goalie stats	Daryl Borden (36 saves / 47 shots)

Belleville wins series 4 – 1

==== (1) Kitchener Rangers vs. (2) Sault Ste. Marie Greyhounds ====
April 16	Kitchener Rangers	3 – 1	Sault Ste. Marie Greyhounds	Kitchener Memorial Auditorium
4:35 - Justin Azevedo (5); 7:10 - Mikkel Bødker (6)		First period	No scoring
No scoring		Second period	Arron Alphonso (2) - 2:38
12:34 - Nick Spaling (6)		Third period	No scoring
Josh Unice (35 saves / 36 shots)		Goalie stats	Kyle Gajewski (22 saves / 25 shots)

April 17	Kitchener Rangers	1 – 3	Sault Ste. Marie Greyhounds	Kitchener Memorial Auditorium
No scoring		First period	No scoring
9:45 - Scott Tregunna (2)		Second period	Wayne Simmonds (5) - 1:35; Matt Caria (6) - pp - 14:13
No scoring		Third period	Andrew Campbell (2) - en - 19:41
Josh Unice (16 saves / 18 shots)		Goalie stats	Kyle Gajewski (43 saves / 44 shots)

April 20	Sault Ste. Marie Greyhounds	3 – 6	Kitchener Rangers	Steelback Centre
5:54 - Arron Alphonso (3)		First period	Scott Timmins (2) - sh - 14:09
17:56 - Dylan King (1)		Second period	Nick Spaling (7) - 4:32; Mike Duco (9) - 5:37; Nazem Kadri (5) - 16:00
10:27 - Jake Muzzin (1)		Third period	Nick Spaling (8) - 9:22; Matthew Halischuk (10) - en - 19:45
Kyle Gajewski (19 saves / 24 shots)		Goalie stats	Josh Unice (25 saves / 28 shots)

April 21	Sault Ste. Marie Greyhounds	3 – 7	Kitchener Rangers	Steelback Centre
11:55 - pp - Josh Godfrey (5)		First period	Justin Azevedo (6) - pp - 4:38
5:16 - Brandon MacLean (4)		Second period	Mikkel Bødker (7) - 4:00; Scott Timmins (3) - 8:20; Matthew Halischuk (11) - pp - 12:45; Mike Duco (10) - sh - 17:40
5:53 - Brandon Biggers (2)		Third period	Nazem Kadri (6) - 12:24; Mike Duco (11) - 18:49
Kyle Gajewski (26 saves / 33 shots)		Goalie stats	Josh Unice (24 saves / 27 shots)

April 23	Kitchener Rangers	5 – 0	Sault Ste. Marie Greyhounds	Kitchener Memorial Auditorium
1:48 - Matthew Halischuk (12)		First period	No scoring
10:48 - Mike Duco (12)		Second period	No scoring
14:01 - pp - Matthew Halischuk (13); 14:46 - pp - Nick Spaling (9); 16:42 - pp - Scott Tregunna (3)		Third period	No scoring
Josh Unice (25 saves / 25 shots)		Goalie stats	Kyle Gajewski (37 saves / 42 shots)

Kitchener wins series 4 – 1

=== J. Ross Robertson Cup ===
==== (W1) Kitchener Rangers vs. (E1) Belleville Bulls ====
April 30	Kitchener Rangers	5 – 2	Belleville Bulls	Kitchener Memorial Auditorium
5:25 - Mikkel Bødker (8)		First period	P.K. Subban (7) - 10:35
2:08 - Nazem Kadri (7); 3:01 - Matt Pepe (2); 14:51 - pp - Nick Spaling (10)		Second period	No scoring
7:04 - Nick Spaling (11)		Third period	Nigel Williams (6) - 7:37
Josh Unice (34 saves / 36 shots)		Goalie stats	Mike Murphy (17 saves / 21 shots); Parker Van Buskirk (5 saves / 6 shots)

May 2	Belleville Bulls	2 – 5	Kitchener Rangers	Yardmen Arena
No scoring		First period	18:17 - Brandon Mashinter (1); 19:59 - Mike Duco (13)
Stephen Blunden (2) - 14:54; Matt Beleskey (9) - 16:23		Second period	16:05 - Matthew Halischuk (14)
No scoring		Third period	9:25 - Mikkel Bødker (9); 14:19 - Justin Azevedo (7)
Parker Van Buskirk (30 saves / 35 shots)		Goalie stats	Josh Unice (23 saves / 25 shots)

May 4	Kitchener Rangers	5 – 3	Belleville Bulls	Kitchener Memorial Auditorium
Mike Duco (14) - pp - 4:18		First period	No scoring
Matthew Halischuk (15) - pp - 12:48; Nick Spaling (12) - pp - 16:22		Second period	9:55 - Stephen Johnston (5)
Scott Tregunna (4) - 8:55; Mike Duco (15) - 17:57		Third period	10:17 - Jan Muršak (9); 17:17 - pp - Eric Tangradi (4)
Josh Unice (26 saves / 29 shots)		Goalie stats	Parker Van Buskirk (45 saves / 50 shots)

May 6	Belleville Bulls	5 – 4	OT	Kitchener Rangers	Yardmen Arena
19:43 - pp - P.K. Subban (8)		First period		Matthew Halischuk (16) - sh - 4:15; Nick Spaling (13) - pp - 13:18; Nazem Kadri (8) - 18:32
7:00 - Keaton Turkiewicz (5)		Second period		Mike Mascioli (3) - 2:12
1:15 - Keaton Turkiewicz (6); 15:42 - Eric Tangradi (5)		Third period		No scoring
8:57 - pp - Matt Beleskey (10)		First overtime period		No scoring
Mike Murphy (24 saves / 28 shots)		Goalie stats		Josh Unice (38 saves / 43 shots)

May 8	Kitchener Rangers	1 – 2	Belleville Bulls	Kitchener Memorial Auditorium
No scoring		First period	No scoring
No scoring		Second period	Cory Tanaka (7) - 17:44
0:17 - pp - Justin Azevedo (8)		Third period	Eric Tangradi (6) - pp - 13:23
Josh Unice (19 saves / 21 shots)		Goalie stats	Mike Murphy (41 saves / 42 shots)

May 10	Belleville Bulls	6 – 3	Kitchener Rangers	Yardmen Arena
15:25 - Cory Tanaka (8); 17:53 - Nigel Williams (7)		First period	Justin Azevedo (9) - 12:57
1:05 - Eric Tangradi (7)		Second period	Justin Azevedo (10) - pp - 6:15; Alex Dzielski (1) - pp - 17:55
1:22 - pp - Matt Beleskey (11); 14:54 - Adam Perry (7); 18:49 - en - Matt Beleskey (12)		Third period	No scoring
Mike Murphy (35 saves / 38 shots)		Goalie stats	Josh Unice (32 saves / 37 shots)

May 12	Kitchener Rangers	4 – 1	Belleville Bulls	Kitchener Memorial Auditorium
17:56 - Brandon Mashinter (2)		First period	No scoring
1:31 - pp - Nick Spaling (14)		Second period	Shawn Matthias (1) - pp - 13:45
6:18 - Nazem Kadri (9); 19:11 - en - Mike Duco (16)		Third period	No scoring
Josh Unice (26 saves / 27 shots)		Goalie stats	Mike Murphy (47 saves / 50 shots)

Kitchener wins series 4 – 3

=== J. Ross Robertson Cup Champions Roster ===
2007-08 Kitchener Rangers
Goaltenders: 30 – Josh Unice; 31 – Matt Smith; 35 – Steve Mason	Defencemen: 3 – Frank Perna; 4 – Alex Dzielski; 5 – Yannick Weber; 7 – Ben Shutron; 8 – Dan Kelly; 9 – Myles Barbieri; 20 – Matt Pepe - C; 21 – Robert Bortuzzo	Wingers: 11 – Nick Spaling – A; 12 – Scott Tregunna; 14 – Mike Duco; 16 – Josh Schram; 17 – Mike Mascioli; 18 – Matthew Halischuk – A; 23 – Brandon Mashinter; 24 – Spencer Anderson; 25 – Jason Akeson; 26 – T.J. Battani; 29 – Alexei Dostoinov; 89 – Mikkel Bødker	Centres: 10 – Michael Catenacci; 13 – Scott Timmins; 15 – Justin Azevedo – A; 19 – Nazem Kadri; Coach: Peter DeBoer; General Manager: Peter DeBoer

=== Playoff scoring leaders ===
Note: GP = Games played; G = Goals; A = Assists; Pts = Points; PIM = Penalty minutes

Player	Team	GP	G	A	Pts	PIM
Justin Azevedo	Kitchener Rangers	20	10	26	36	33
Mikkel Bødker	Kitchener Rangers	20	9	26	35	2
Matt Beleskey	Belleville Bulls	21	12	21	33	23
Matthew Halischuk	Kitchener Rangers	20	16	16	32	0
Nick Spaling	Kitchener Rangers	20	14	16	30	9
Nazem Kadri	Kitchener Rangers	20	9	17	26	26
Jan Muršak	Belleville Bulls	21	9	15	24	10
P. K. Subban	Belleville Bulls	21	8	15	23	28
Mike Duco	Kitchener Rangers	20	16	6	22	37
Michael Swift	Niagara IceDogs	10	9	9	18	22
Stefan Legein	Niagara IceDogs	10	7	11	18	28
Adam Perry	Belleville Bulls	21	7	11	18	2
Eric Tangradi	Belleville Bulls	21	7	11	18	20
Nigel Williams	Belleville Bulls	21	7	11	18	20

=== Playoff leading goaltenders ===
Note: GP = Games played; Mins = Minutes played; W = Wins; L = Losses: OTL = Overtime losses; SL = Shootout losses; GA = Goals Allowed; SO = Shutouts; GAA = Goals against average

Player	Team	GP	Mins	W	L	GA	SO	Sv%	GAA
Bryan Pitton	Brampton Battalion	5	333	1	4	10	0	0.938	1.80
Tom McCollum	Guelph Storm	10	596	5	5	19	1	0.937	1.91
Steve Mason	Kitchener Rangers	5	313	5	0	10	1	0.946	1.92
Mike Murphy	Belleville Bulls	19	1085	14	4	42	1	0.927	2.32
Josh Unice	Kitchener Rangers	16	948	11	4	38	1	0.915	2.41

== All-Star teams ==
=== First team ===
- Justin Azevedo, Centre, Kitchener Rangers
- Brett MacLean, Left Wing, Oshawa Generals
- Matthew Halischuk, Right Wing, Kitchener Rangers
- Drew Doughty, Defence, Guelph Storm
- Zach Bogosian, Defence, Peterborough Petes
- Mike Murphy, Goaltender, Belleville Bulls
- Bob Boughner, Coach, Windsor Spitfires

=== Second team ===
- Steven Stamkos, Centre, Sarnia Sting
- Luca Caputi, Left Wing, Niagara IceDogs
- Stefan Legein, Right Wing, Niagara IceDogs
- Bob Sanguinetti, Defence, Brampton Battalion
- Yannick Weber, Defence, Kitchener Rangers
- Steve Mason, Goaltender, Kitchener Rangers
- Peter DeBoer, Coach, Kitchener Rangers

=== Third team ===
- Shawn Matthias, Centre, Belleville Bulls
- Matt Beleskey, Left Wing, Belleville Bulls
- Wayne Simmonds, Right Wing, Sault Ste. Marie Greyhounds
- Alex Pietrangelo, Defence, Niagara IceDogs
- Ryan Wilson, Defence, Sarnia Sting
- Thomas McCollum, Goaltender, Guelph Storm
- George Burnett, Coach, Belleville Bulls

== All-Star Classic ==
The OHL All-Star Classic was played February 6, 2008 at the Steelback Centre in Sault Ste. Marie, won 8–7 in a shootout by the Eastern Conference. The skills competition was held the previous night on February 5, with the Eastern Conference winning 19–18.

== Awards ==
J. Ross Robertson Cup:	Kitchener Rangers
Hamilton Spectator Trophy:	Kitchener Rangers
Bobby Orr Trophy:	Belleville Bulls
Wayne Gretzky Trophy:	Kitchener Rangers
Emms Trophy:	Brampton Battalion
Leyden Trophy:	Belleville Bulls
Holody Trophy:	Kitchener Rangers
Bumbacco Trophy:	Sault Ste. Marie Greyhounds
Red Tilson Trophy:	Justin Azevedo, Kitchener Rangers
Eddie Powers Memorial Trophy:	Justin Azevedo, Kitchener Rangers
Matt Leyden Trophy:	Bob Boughner, Windsor Spitfires
Jim Mahon Memorial Trophy:	John Hughes, Brampton Battalion
Max Kaminsky Trophy:	Drew Doughty, Guelph Storm
OHL Goaltender of the Year:	Mike Murphy, Belleville Bulls
Jack Ferguson Award:	John McFarland, Sudbury Wolves
Dave Pinkney Trophy:	Kyle Gajewski, Sault Ste. Marie Greyhounds
OHL Executive of the Year:	Denise Burke, Niagara IceDogs
Bill Long Award:	Don Brankley, London Knights & Gil Hughes, Oshawa Generals
Emms Family Award:	Taylor Hall, Windsor Spitfires
F. W. "Dinty" Moore Trophy:	Josh Unice, Kitchener Rangers
Dan Snyder Memorial Trophy:	Pete Stevens, Kingston Frontenacs
William Hanley Trophy:	Nick Spaling, Kitchener Rangers
Leo Lalonde Memorial Trophy:	Michael Swift, Niagara IceDogs
Bobby Smith Trophy:	Ryan Ellis, Windsor Spitfires
Roger Neilson Memorial Award:	Scott Aarssen, London Knights
Ivan Tennant Memorial Award:	Alex Friesen, Niagara IceDogs
Tim Adams Memorial Trophy:	John McFarland, Toronto Jr. Canadiens
Wayne Gretzky 99 Award:	Justin Azevedo, Kitchener Rangers

== 2008 OHL Priority Selection ==
On May 3, 2008, the OHL conducted the 2008 Ontario Hockey League Priority Selection. The Sudbury Wolves held the first overall pick in the draft, and selected John McFarland from the Toronto Jr. Canadiens. McFarland was awarded the Jack Ferguson Award, awarded to the top pick in the draft.

Below are the players who were selected in the first round of the 2008 Ontario Hockey League Priority Selection.

#	Player	Nationality	OHL team	Hometown	Minor team
1	John McFarland (RW)	Canada	Sudbury Wolves	Richmond Hill, Ontario	Toronto Jr. Canadiens
2	Greg McKegg (C)	Canada	Erie Otters	St. Thomas, Ontario	Elgin-Middlesex Chiefs
3	Steven Shipley (C)	Canada	Owen Sound Attack	Ilderton, Ontario	Elgin-Middlesex Chiefs
4	Erik Gudbranson (D)	Canada	Kingston Frontenacs	Orleans, Ontario	Ottawa Jr. 67's
5	Ryan Spooner (C)	Canada	Peterborough Petes	Kanata, Ontario	Ottawa Jr. Senators
6	Ryan O'Connor (D)	Canada	Barrie Colts	Hamilton, Ontario	Toronto Jr. Canadiens
7	Tyler Toffoli (RW)	Canada	Ottawa 67's	Scarborough, Ontario	Toronto Jr. Canadiens
8	Devante Smith-Pelly (RW)	Canada	Mississauga St. Michael's Majors	Scarborough, Ontario	Toronto Jr. Canadiens
9	Tyler Seguin (C)	Canada	Plymouth Whalers	Brampton, Ontario	Toronto Nationals
10	Brandon Saad (LW)	United States	Saginaw Spirit	Gibsonia, Pennsylvania	Pittsburgh Hornets
11	Gregg Sutch (RW)	Canada	Sarnia Sting	Newmarket, Ontario	York-Simcoe Express
12	Cody McNaughton (RW)	Canada	Guelph Storm	Etobicoke, Ontario	Toronto Jr. Canadiens
13	Christian Thomas (LW)	Canada	London Knights	Toronto, Ontario	Toronto Marlboros
14	Freddie Hamilton (RW)	Canada	Niagara IceDogs	St. Catharines, Ontario	Toronto Marlboros
15	Sam Carrick (C)	Canada	Brampton Battalion	Goodwood, Ontario	Toronto Red Wings
16	Kevin Bailie (G)	Canada	Oshawa Generals	Belleville, Ontario	Quinte Red Devils
17	Cam Fowler (D)	United States	Windsor Spitfires	Farmington Hills, Michigan	USA U17
18	Brock Beukeboom (D)	Canada	Sault Ste. Marie Greyhounds	Port Perry, Ontario	Central Ontario Wolves
19	Stephen Silas (D)	Canada	Belleville Bulls	Georgetown, Ontario	Halton Hills Hurricanes
20	Jeff Skinner (LW)	Canada	Kitchener Rangers	Markham, Ontario	Toronto Nationals

== 2008 CHL Import Draft ==
On June 29, 2008, the Canadian Hockey League conducted the 2008 CHL Import Draft, in which teams in all three CHL leagues participate in. The Sudbury Wolves held the first pick in the draft by a team in the OHL, and selected Nikita Filatov from Russia with their selection.

Below are the players who were selected in the first round by Ontario Hockey League teams in the 2008 CHL Import Draft.

#	Player	OHL team	Hometown	Minor team
1	Nikita Filatov (LW)	Sudbury Wolves	Moscow, Russia	Moscow HC CSKA-2
4	Edgar Rybakov (C)	Erie Otters	Vilnius, Lithuania	Moscow HC CSKA-2
7	Andrei Loktionov (C)	Windsor Spitfires	Voskresensk, Russia	Yaroslavl Lokomotiv-2
10	Richard Panik (RW)	Windsor Spitfires	Martin, Slovakia	Trinec HC Zelenzarny Jr.
13	Adam Sedlak (D)	Peterborough Petes	Ostrava, Czech Republic	Vitkovice Ostrave Jr.
16	William Wallén (RW)	Mississauga St. Michael's Majors	Stockholm, Sweden	Djurgarden IF Jr.
19	Tomas Rachunek (RW)	Sault Ste. Marie Greyhounds	Zlín, Czech Republic	Vsetin Jr.
22	Sergei Sheleg (D)	Sudbury Wolves	Minsk, Belarus	Minsk Junost 2
25	Philipp Grubauer (G)	Belleville Bulls	Rosenheim, Germany	Starbulls Rosenheim Jr.
28	Jakub Svoboda (LW)	Saginaw Spirit	Přerov, Czech Republic	Brno Kometa Jr.
31	Miroslav Preisinger (C)	Sarnia Sting	Bratislava, Slovakia	Bratislava Slovan Jr.
34	Robert Kousal (LW)	Oshawa Generals	Pardubice, Czech Republic	Pardubice Jr.
37	Sergei Korostin (RW)	London Knights	Prokopievsk, Russia	Texas Tornado
40	Evgeny Grachev (LW)	Brampton Battalion	Yaroslavl, Russia	Yaroslavl Lokomotiv-2
43	Maximilian Englbrecht (G)	Niagara IceDogs	Landshut, Germany	Landshut EV Jr.
46	Evgeny Molotilov (D)	Guelph Storm	Moscow, Russia	Moscow Dynamo-2
49	Richard Jarusek (RW)	Saginaw Spirit	Brno, Czech Republic	Brno Kometa Jr.
52	Kirill Polozov (RW)	Barrie Colts	Ufa, Russia	Ufa Salavat Yulayev-2
55	Jan Latal (D)	Plymouth Whalers	Středokluky, Czech Republic	Kladno Jr.
57	Simon Groenvaldt (D)	Kitchener Rangers	Rodovre, Denmark	Rodovre Mighty Bulls

== 2008 NHL entry draft ==
On June 20–21, 2008, the National Hockey League conducted the 2008 NHL entry draft held at Scotiabank Place in Ottawa, Ontario. In total, 46 players from the Ontario Hockey League were selected in the draft. Steven Stamkos of the Sarnia Sting was the first player from the OHL to be selected, as he was taken with the first overall pick by the Tampa Bay Lightning.

Below are the players selected from OHL teams at the NHL Entry Draft.

Round	#	Player	NHL team	Hometown	OHL team
1	1	Steven Stamkos (C)	Tampa Bay Lightning	Unionville, Ontario	Sarnia Sting
1	2	Drew Doughty (D)	Los Angeles Kings	London, Ontario	Guelph Storm
1	3	Zach Bogosian (D)	Atlanta Thrashers	Massena, New York	Peterborough Petes
1	4	Alex Pietrangelo (D)	St. Louis Blues	King City, Ontario	Niagara IceDogs
1	8	Mikkel Boedker (RW)	Phoenix Coyotes	Brondby, Denmark	Kitchener Rangers
1	9	Josh Bailey (C)	New York Islanders	Bowmanville, Ontario	Windsor Spitfires
1	10	Cody Hodgson (C)	Vancouver Canucks	Markham, Ontario	Brampton Battalion
1	20	Michael Del Zotto (D)	New York Rangers	Stouffville, Ontario	Oshawa Generals
1	23	Tyler Cuma (D)	Minnesota Wild	Bowmanville, Ontario	Ottawa 67's
1	25	Greg Nemisz (RW)	Calgary Flames	Courtice, Ontario	Windsor Spitfires
1	30	Tom McCollum (G)	Detroit Red Wings	Sanborn, New York	Guelph Storm
2	33	Philip McRae (C)	St. Louis Blues	Chesterfield, Missouri	London Knights
2	39	Eric O'Dell (C)	Anaheim Ducks	Ottawa, Ontario	Sudbury Wolves
2	49	Jared Staal (RW)	Phoenix Coyotes	Thunder Bay, Ontario	Sudbury Wolves
2	50	Cameron Gaunce (D)	Colorado Avalanche	Markham, Ontario	Mississauga St. Michael's Majors
2	59	Tyler Beskorowany (G)	Dallas Stars	Hanmer, Ontario	Owen Sound Attack
3	68	Shawn Lalonde (D)	Chicago Blackhawks	Orleans, Ontario	Belleville Bulls
3	70	James Livingston (RW)	St. Louis Blues	Newmarket, Ontario	Sault Ste. Marie Greyhounds
3	71	Josh Brittain (LW)	Anaheim Ducks	Milton, Ontario	Kingston Frontenacs
3	74	Andrew Campbell (D)	Los Angeles Kings	Caledonia, Ontario	Sault Ste. Marie Greyhounds
3	77	Michael Hutchinson (G)	Boston Bruins	Barrie, Ontario	Barrie Colts
3	80	Adam Comrie (D)	Florida Panthers	Ashburn, Virginia	Saginaw Spirit
3	82	Adam Henrique (C)	New Jersey Devils	Burford, Ontario	Windsor Spitfires
4	97	Jamie Arniel (C)	Boston Bruins	Kingston, Ontario	Sarnia Sting
4	100	A.J. Jenks (LW)	Florida Panthers	Wolverine Lake, Michigan	Plymouth Whalers
4	105	Michal Jordan (D)	Carolina Hurricanes	Zlín, Czech Republic	Plymouth Whalers
4	114	T.J. Brodie (D)	Calgary Flames	Dresden, Ontario	Saginaw Spirit
4	116	Jason Missiaen (G)	Montreal Canadiens	Chatham, Ontario	Peterborough Petes
4	120	Nathan Moon (C)	Pittsburgh Penguins	Belleville, Ontario	Kingston Frontenacs
5	142	Kory Nagy (LW)	New Jersey Devils	Walsingham, Ontario	Oshawa Generals
5	146	Julien Demers (D)	San Jose Sharks	Ottawa, Ontario	Ottawa 67's
5	147	Kyle DeCoste (RW)	Tampa Bay Lightning	London, Ontario	Brampton Battalion
5	148	Matt Martin (LW)	New York Islanders	Windsor, Ontario	Sarnia Sting
6	153	Justin Azevedo (C)	Los Angeles Kings	West Lorne, Ontario	Kitchener Rangers
6	154	Chris Carrozzi (G)	Atlanta Thrashers	Nepean, Ontario	Mississauga St. Michael's Majors
6	155	Anthony Nigro (C)	St. Louis Blues	Woodbridge, Ontario	Guelph Storm
6	164	Nick Crawford (D)	Buffalo Sabres	Caledon, Ontario	Saginaw Spirit
6	165	Mike Murphy (G)	Carolina Hurricanes	Inverary, Ontario	Belleville Bulls
6	171	Mitch Gaulton (D)	New York Rangers	Grimsby, Ontario	Erie Otters
6	175	Justin DiBenedetto (LW)	New York Islanders	Vaughan, Ontario	Sarnia Sting
6	178	Zac Rinaldo (LW)	Philadelphia Flyers	Hamilton, Ontario	Mississauga St. Michael's Majors
6	180	Patrick Killeen (G)	Pittsburgh Penguins	Carp, Ontario	Brampton Battalion
6	181	Stephen Johnston (C)	Detroit Red Wings	Guelph, Ontario	Belleville Bulls
7	189	Tim Billingsley (D)	Phoenix Coyotes	Ottawa, Ontario	Mississauga St. Michael's Majors
7	202	Harry Young (D)	New Jersey Devils	Windsor, Ontario	Windsor Spitfires
7	204	Stefan Della Rovere (LW)	Washington Capitals	Maple, Ontario	Barrie Colts

== See also ==
- List of OHA Junior A standings
- List of OHL seasons
- 2008 NHL entry draft
- 2008 Memorial Cup
- 2007–08 QMJHL season
- 2007–08 WHL season
- 2007 in ice hockey
- 2008 in ice hockey

Preceded by 2006–07 OHL season	OHL seasons	Succeeded by 2008–09 OHL season
