= Justin Soryal =

Canadian ice hockey player

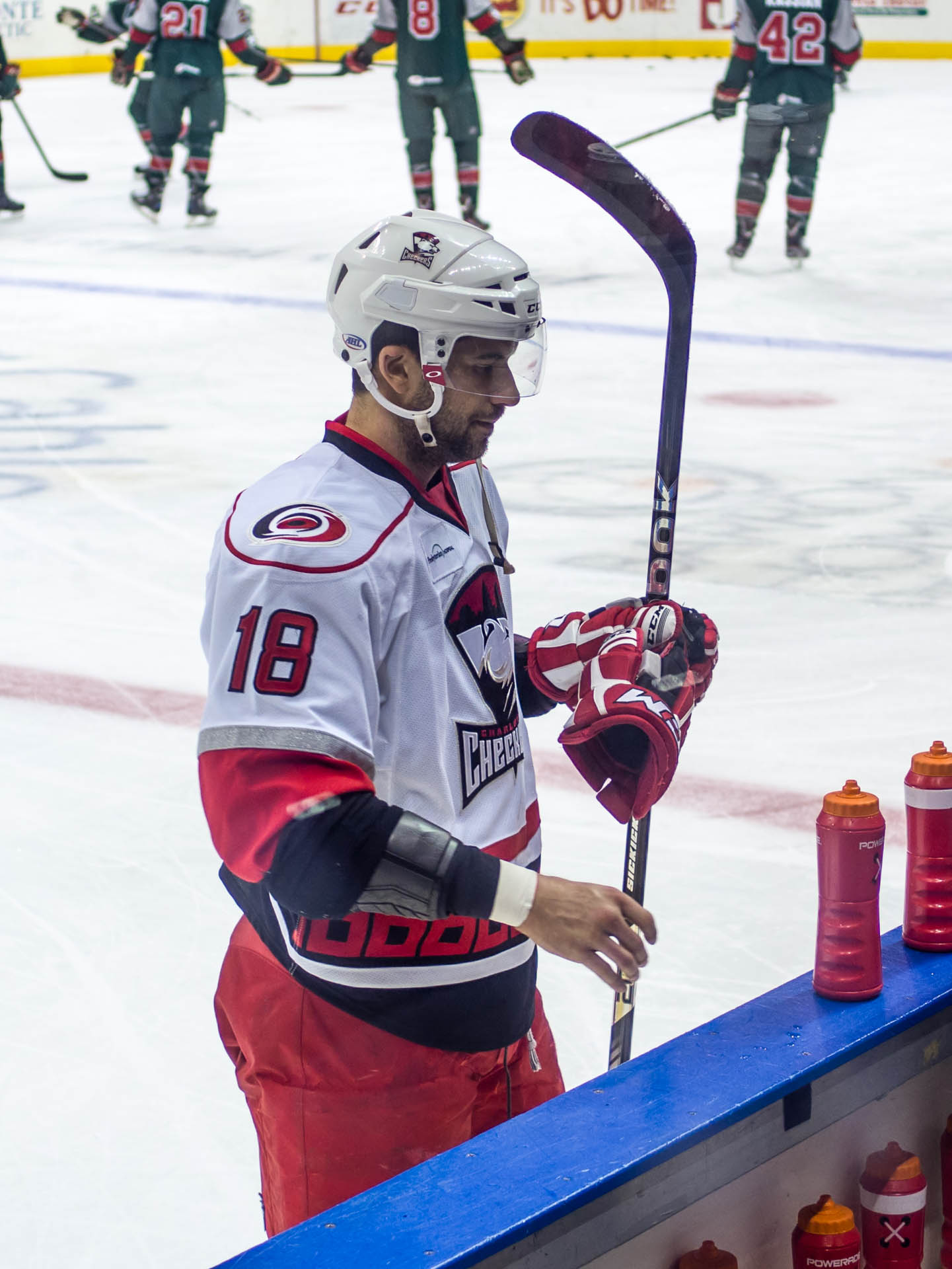
- Born: June 29, 1987 (age 39) Newmarket, Ontario, Canada
- Height: 6 ft 2 in (188 cm)
- Weight: 210 lb (95 kg; 15 st 0 lb)
- Position: Left wing
- Shot: Left
- Played for: Hartford Wolf Pack; Connecticut Whale; Charlotte Checkers
- NHL draft: Undrafted
- Playing career: 2008–2013

Justin Soryal (born June 29, 1987) is a Canadian former professional ice hockey forward who was known as an enforcer and played in the American Hockey League (AHL).

== Playing career ==
Undrafted out of the Ontario Hockey League with the Peterborough Petes, Soryal was signed as a free agent by the New York Rangers on March 12, 2008.

On July 2, 2011, he was signed as a free agent by the Carolina Hurricanes and immediately signed to AHL affiliate, the Charlotte Checkers. During his first campaign with the Checkers in the 2011–12 season, Soryal had matched his career high of 10 points and led the Checkers in fights. However, on March 11, 2012, he was injured in a collision with Mike Duco, which resulted in a tibial plateau fracture. He missed the remainder of the season, and with the debilitating injury was unable to fully recover in the following 2012–13 season.

With the fracture jeopardising his balance and effectiveness in fights he announced his retirement due to the career-ending injury at the conclusion of his second year with the Checkers.

== Career statistics ==
| | | | Regular season | | | | | Playoffs |
| Season | Team | League | GP | G | A | Pts | PIM | GP | G | A | Pts | PIM |
|---|---|---|---|---|---|---|---|---|---|---|---|---|
| 2003–04 | Aurora Tigers | OPJHL | 3 | 0 | 0 | 0 | 2 | — | — | — | — | — |
| 2004–05 | Peterborough Petes | OHL | 29 | 0 | 1 | 1 | 54 | 14 | 0 | 1 | 1 | 21 |
| 2005–06 | Peterborough Petes | OHL | 53 | 3 | 3 | 6 | 136 | 17 | 0 | 1 | 1 | 16 |
| 2006–07 | Peterborough Petes | OHL | 60 | 26 | 27 | 53 | 125 | — | — | — | — | — |
| 2007–08 | Peterborough Petes | OHL | 59 | 17 | 22 | 39 | 140 | 5 | 2 | 0 | 2 | 8 |
| 2008–09 | Hartford Wolf Pack | AHL | 43 | 3 | 7 | 10 | 114 | — | — | — | — | — |
| 2009–10 | Hartford Wolf Pack | AHL | 67 | 5 | 4 | 9 | 159 | — | — | — | — | — |
| 2010–11 | Hartford Wolf Pack/CT Whale | AHL | 79 | 3 | 3 | 6 | 220 | 1 | 0 | 0 | 0 | 0 |
| 2011–12 | Charlotte Checkers | AHL | 60 | 4 | 6 | 10 | 164 | — | — | — | — | — |
| 2012–13 | Charlotte Checkers | AHL | 28 | 1 | 2 | 3 | 30 | — | — | — | — | — |
| AHL totals | | | 277 | 16 | 22 | 38 | 687 | 1 | 0 | 0 | 0 | 0 |
