= Harrison Reed =

Harrison Reed is the name of:

- Harrison Reed (politician) (1813–1899), ninth Governor of Florida
- Harrison Reed (ice hockey) (born 1988), Canadian ice hockey player
- Harrison Reed (footballer) (born 1995), English association football player
