= Michael Caruso (ice hockey) =

Canadian ice hockey player (born 1988)

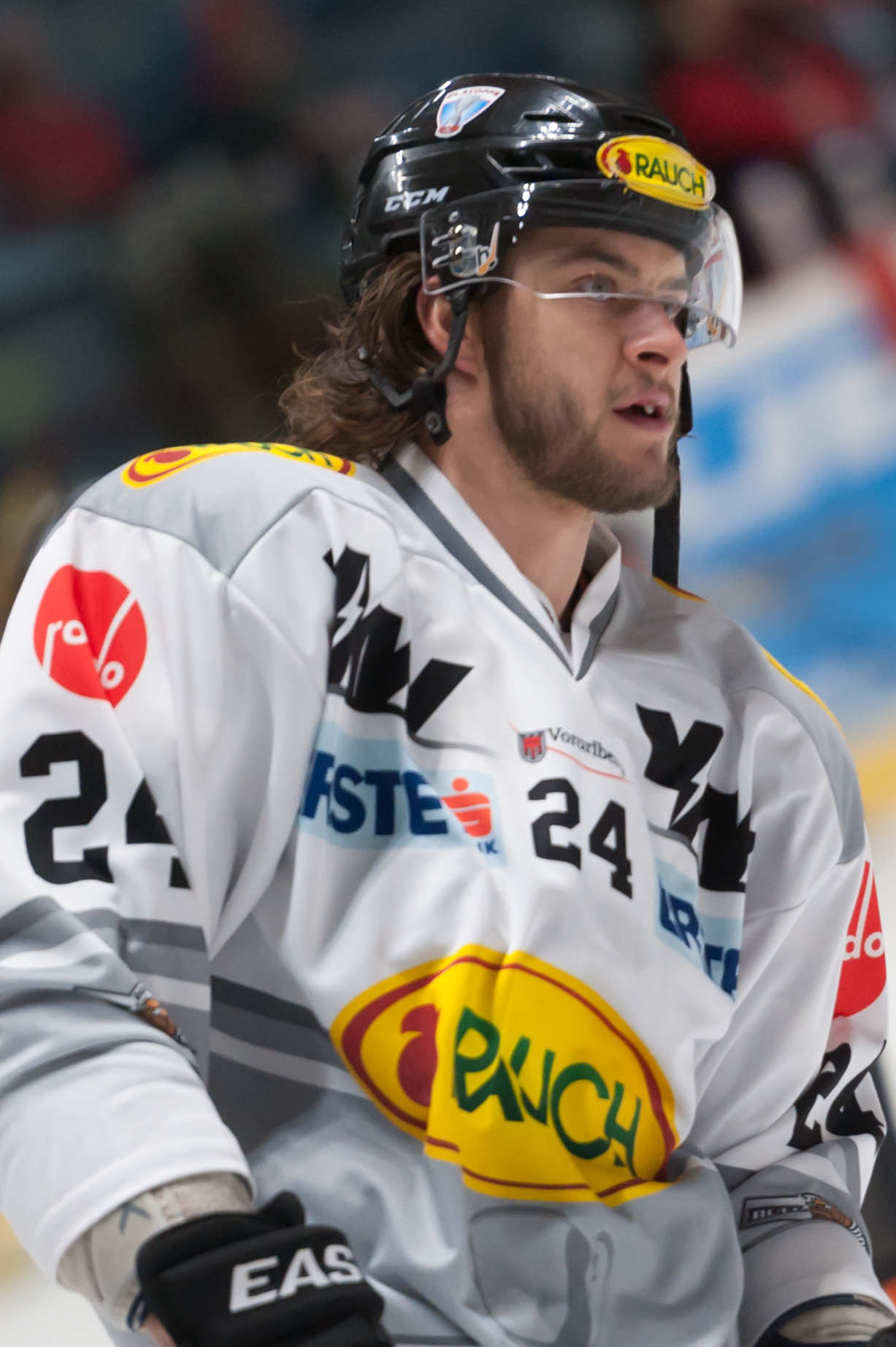
- Born: July 5, 1988 (age 38) Mississauga, Ontario, Canada
- Height: 6 ft 2 in (188 cm)
- Weight: 191 lb (87 kg; 13 st 9 lb)
- Position: Defence
- Shoots: Left
- EIHL team Former teams: Nottingham Panthers; Florida Panthers; San Antonio Rampage; Dornbirner EC; Fehérvár AV19; HC Pustertal Wölfe
- NHL draft: 103rd overall, 2006; Florida Panthers
- Playing career: 2008–present

Michael Caruso (born July 5, 1988) is a Canadian professional ice hockey defenceman. He is currently playing for the Nottingham Panthers of the Elite Ice Hockey League (EIHL).

== Playing career ==
Caruso was selected in the 4th round, 103rd overall, by the Florida Panthers in the 2008 NHL entry draft, after an outstanding junior career with the Guelph Storm of the Ontario Hockey League (OHL).

Following a strong training camp, Caruso was assigned to the Panthers' American Hockey League affiliate, the Rochester Americans, to start the 2008–09 season.

A free agent in the 2014–15 season, Caruso belatedly signed an ECHL contract with the Reading Royals on November 8, 2014. In adding a stabilising influence to the Royals blueline, Caruso contributed with 20 points in 65 games.

On June 12, 2015, Caruso signed his first contract abroad, a one-year deal with Austrian club, Dornbirner EC of the EBEL. After three seasons with the Bulldogs, Caruso left as a free agent, continuing in the EBEL with Hungarian competitors, Fehérvár AV19, on September 15, 2018.

After a season playing for HC Pustertal Wölfe, Caruso signed in the UK for the Nottingham Panthers of the EIHL for the 2022/23 season.

== Career statistics ==
=== Regular season and playoffs ===
			Regular season					Playoffs
Season	Team	League	GP	G	A	Pts	PIM	GP	G	A	Pts	PIM
2004–05	Guelph Storm	OHL	56	0	3	3	31	4	0	0	0	2
2005–06	Guelph Storm	OHL	66	1	15	16	85	15	1	2	3	24
2006–07	Guelph Storm	OHL	64	4	16	20	119	4	0	0	0	8
2007–08	Guelph Storm	OHL	62	10	24	34	103	10	2	6	8	22
2008–09	Rochester Americans	AHL	73	1	9	10	66	—	—	—	—	—
2009–10	Rochester Americans	AHL	67	1	10	11	42	—	—	—	—	—
2010–11	Rochester Americans	AHL	75	5	4	9	77	—	—	—	—	—
2011–12	San Antonio Rampage	AHL	68	5	8	13	63	10	0	4	4	4
2012–13	San Antonio Rampage	AHL	35	1	3	4	22	—	—	—	—	—
2012–13	Florida Panthers	NHL	2	0	0	0	0	—	—	—	—	—
2013–14	San Antonio Rampage	AHL	35	0	2	2	32	—	—	—	—	—
2014–15	Reading Royals	ECHL	65	4	16	20	63	—	—	—	—	—
2015–16	Dornbirner EC	EBEL	53	2	13	15	53	6	0	0	0	4
2016–17	Dornbirner EC	EBEL	54	3	3	6	38	—	—	—	—	—
2017–18	Dornbirner EC	EBEL	54	4	11	15	54	6	0	2	2	4
2018–19	Fehérvár AV19	EBEL	51	3	14	17	18	6	1	2	3	4
2019–20	Hydro Fehérvár AV19	EBEL	38	2	7	9	24	—	—	—	—	—
2020–21	Hydro Fehérvár AV19	ICEHL	48	4	9	13	34	4	0	1	1	4
2021–22	HC Pustertal Wölfe	ICEHL	44	2	12	14	47	4	0	0	0	4
2022–23	Nottingham Panthers	EIHL	44	1	7	8	34	2	0	0	0	0
2023–24	Nottingham Panthers	EIHL	49	0	8	8	61	–	–	–	–	–
AHL totals			353	13	36	49	302	10	0	4	4	4
NHL totals			2	0	0	0	0	—	—	—	—	—
EBEL/ICEHL totals			342	20	69	89	268	26	1	5	6	20

=== International ===
Year	Team	Event	GP	G	A	Pts	PIM
2005	Canada Ontario	U17	6	0	0	0	2
Junior totals			6	0	0	0	2
