= Nick Crawford =

Canadian ice hockey player

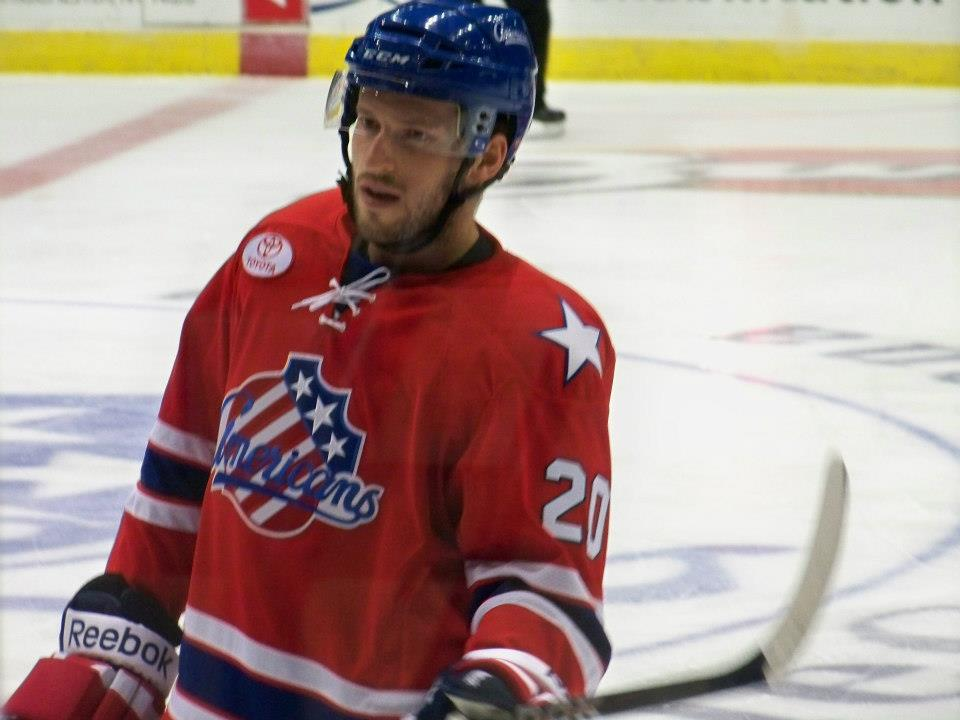
- Crawford with the Rochester Americans in 2013
- Born: February 23, 1990 (age 36) Caledon, Ontario, Canada
- Height: 6 ft 1 in (185 cm)
- Weight: 183 lb (83 kg; 13 st 1 lb)
- Position: Defence
- Shot: Left
- Played for: Rochester Americans; Dornbirner EC; Esbjerg Energy; DVTK Jegesmedvék; Rødovre Mighty Bulls
- NHL draft: 164th overall, 2008; Buffalo Sabres
- Playing career: 2010–2020

Nick Crawford (born January 2, 1990) is a Canadian former professional ice hockey player. He was selected in the 6th round (164th overall) of the 2008 NHL entry draft by the Buffalo Sabres.

== Playing career ==
=== Amateur ===
Crawford grew up playing minor hockey in the Toronto area and played for the Chinguacousy Blues, Vaughan Kings, Mississauga Rebels and Don Mills Flyers. He was a member of the 2003 All-Ontario Peewee Champion Vaughan Kings and the 2005-06 GTHL Champion Don Mills Flyers.

After minor hockey, Crawford was selected in the 1st round (12th overall) of the 2006 OHL Priority Selection by the Saginaw Spirit. He played junior hockey in the Ontario Hockey League with the Saginaw Spirit and Barrie Colts. In 2010, he was named to the OHL First All-Star Team and the CHL First All-Star Team.

In his final season of OHL hockey, Crawford became the first defenseman in OHL history to lead the league in Defenseman Scoring and Plus/Minus in the same season.

=== Professional ===
Crawford began the 2010–11 season in the American Hockey League with the Portland Pirates. During his four years within the Buffalo Sabres organization, Crawford remained in the AHL with the Rochester Americans.

On October 13, 2014, after he was unable to secure an NHL contract, Crawford opted to begin a career abroad in signing a one-year contract with Austrian club, Dornbirner EC of the EBEL.

== Career statistics ==
			Regular season					Playoffs
Season	Team	League	GP	G	A	Pts	PIM	GP	G	A	Pts	PIM
2005–06	Don Mills Flyers	GTHL	80	10	44	54	64	—	—	—	—	—
2006–07	Saginaw Spirit	OHL	63	1	7	8	32	5	0	1	1	0
2007–08	Saginaw Spirit	OHL	68	4	16	20	58	4	1	1	2	2
2008–09	Saginaw Spirit	OHL	65	7	35	42	41	8	1	4	5	4
2009–10	Saginaw Spirit	OHL	19	4	17	21	4	—	—	—	—	—
2009–10	Barrie Colts	OHL	49	7	42	49	20	17	0	12	12	4
2010–11	Portland Pirates	AHL	76	7	24	31	27	12	0	2	2	4
2011–12	Rochester Americans	AHL	70	6	16	22	26	3	0	1	1	0
2012–13	Rochester Americans	AHL	53	5	14	19	18	1	0	0	0	0
2013–14	Rochester Americans	AHL	63	5	13	18	28	5	1	1	2	6
2014–15	Dornbirner EC	EBEL	41	2	23	25	20	—	—	—	—	—
2015–16	Dornbirner EC	EBEL	29	0	3	3	12	6	1	3	4	4
2016–17	Dornbirner EC	EBEL	54	1	10	11	50	—	—	—	—	—
2017–18	Esbjerg Energy	DEN	50	4	24	28	24	14	2	3	5	4
2018–19	DVTK Jegesmedvék	Slovak	57	3	20	23	42	3	0	0	0	2
2019–20	Rødovre Mighty Bulls	DEN	48	7	16	23	16	—	—	—	—	—
AHL totals			262	23	67	90	99	21	1	4	5	10
