= Matthew Halischuk =

Canadian ice hockey player (born 1988)

Matt Halischuk
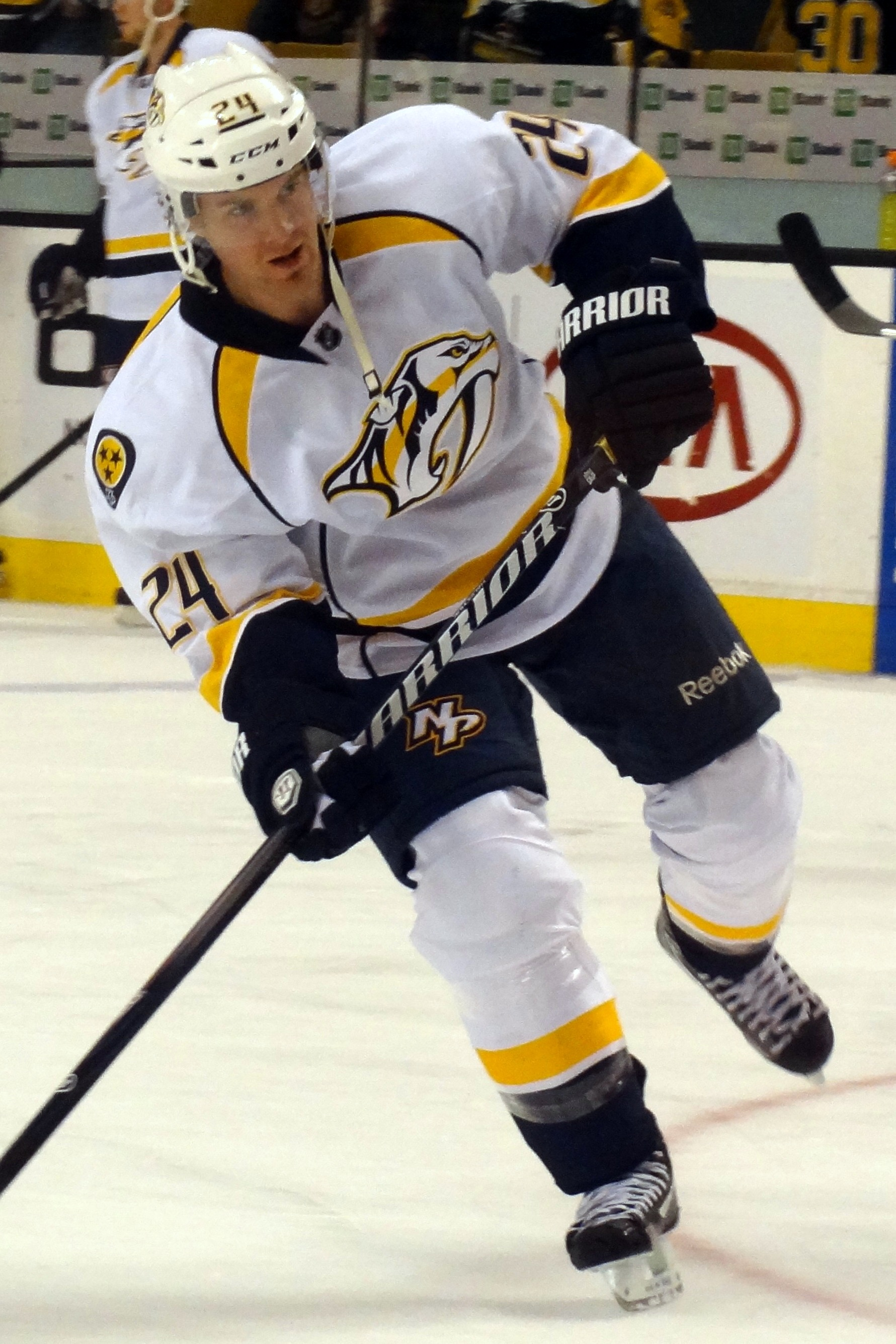
- Halischuk with the Nashville Predators in 2012
- Born: June 1, 1988 (age 38) Toronto, Ontario, Canada
- Height: 6 ft 0 in (183 cm)
- Weight: 180 lb (82 kg; 12 st 12 lb)
- Position: Right wing
- Shot: Right
- Played for: New Jersey Devils; Nashville Predators; Winnipeg Jets; Iserlohn Roosters
- NHL draft: 117th overall, 2007; New Jersey Devils
- Playing career: 2008–2017

Matthew "Matt" Halischuk (born June 1, 1988) is a Canadian former professional ice hockey right winger. He played in the National Hockey League (NHL) with the New Jersey Devils, Nashville Predators and Winnipeg Jets. Halischuk is of Ukrainian descent.

== Playing career ==
Halischuk was drafted 117th overall in the 2007 NHL entry draft by the New Jersey Devils. He was drafted from the Ontario Hockey League (OHL) where he played for the Kitchener Rangers and the Toronto St. Michael's Majors. He was selected to Team Canada for the 2008 IIHF World U20 Championship. At the Under-20 Championship, he scored the game-winning goal in overtime of the gold medal game.

Halischuk made his professional debut in the 2008–09 season with the Lowell Devils, the American Hockey League (AHL) affiliate of the New Jersey Devils. He played his first NHL game against the Toronto Maple Leafs on October 29, 2008, at the Prudential Center and recorded an assist before returning to Lowell for the remainder of the year. In the following season, 2009–10, Halischuk scored his first NHL goal, against José Théodore in a 5–2 victory over the Washington Capitals on November 14, 2009.

On June 19, 2010, Halischuk was traded by the Devils (along with a second round draft pick) to the Nashville Predators in exchange for Predators' captain Jason Arnott. On April 30, 2011, Halischuk scored the game-winning goal in the second overtime of Game 2 of the Western Conference Semifinal series against the Vancouver Canucks to even the series at 1–1. It was Nashville's first ever win in the second round of the playoffs.

On July 7, 2011, Halischuk signed a two-year contract with the Predators. After the lockout-shortened 2012–13 season, Halischuk was not given a qualifying offer by the Predators, releasing him as a free agent. On July 11, 2013, he signed a one-year contract with the Winnipeg Jets. On July 1, 2015, Halischuk resigned with the Jets with a one-year, $750,000 contract. On December 17, 2015 Halischuk was recalled to the Winnipeg Jets.

On October 29, 2016, Halischuk signed a contract with the Iserlohn Roosters of the Deutsche Eishockey Liga (DEL), Germany's top league. He made 23 appearances for the Roosters, tallying four goals and six assists, before parting ways with the team on January 23, 2017.

== Personal life ==
Halischuk is no longer married to Erin Pryde of London, Ontario. Their marriage took place on July 12, 2014.

== Career statistics ==
=== Regular season and playoffs ===
			Regular season					Playoffs
Season	Team	League	GP	G	A	Pts	PIM	GP	G	A	Pts	PIM
2004–05	Toronto St. Michael's Majors	OHL	30	3	3	6	4	—	—	—	—	—
2004–05	St. Michael's Buzzers	OPJHL	32	10	15	25	4	17	5	11	16	8
2005–06	Toronto St. Michael's Majors	OHL	61	13	18	31	16	4	1	1	2	0
2006–07	Kitchener Rangers	OHL	67	33	33	66	20	9	4	1	5	10
2007–08	Kitchener Rangers	OHL	40	13	46	59	16	20	16	16	32	0
2008–09	Lowell Devils	AHL	47	14	15	29	10	—	—	—	—	—
2008–09	New Jersey Devils	NHL	1	0	1	1	0	—	—	—	—	—
2009–10	New Jersey Devils	NHL	20	1	1	2	2	—	—	—	—	—
2009–10	Lowell Devils	AHL	32	11	11	22	2	1	0	0	0	0
2010–11	Milwaukee Admirals	AHL	37	11	12	23	12	1	1	1	2	0
2010–11	Nashville Predators	NHL	27	4	8	12	2	12	2	0	2	0
2011–12	Nashville Predators	NHL	73	15	13	28	27	5	0	1	1	4
2012–13	Nashville Predators	NHL	36	5	6	11	10	—	—	—	—	—
2012–13	Milwaukee Admirals	AHL	2	2	1	3	0	—	—	—	—	—
2013–14	Winnipeg Jets	NHL	46	5	5	10	6	—	—	—	—	—
2014–15	Winnipeg Jets	NHL	47	3	5	8	6	1	0	0	0	0
2015–16	Manitoba Moose	AHL	39	6	12	18	6	—	—	—	—	—
2015–16	Winnipeg Jets	NHL	30	0	3	3	4	—	—	—	—	—
2016–17	Iserlohn Roosters	DEL	23	4	6	10	6	—	—	—	—	—
NHL totals			280	33	42	75	57	18	2	1	3	4

Medal record

Ice hockey

Representing Canada

World Junior Championships
Gold medal – first place	2008 Czech Republic	

=== International ===
Year	Team	Event	Result	GP	G	A	Pts	PIM
2005	Canada Ontario	U17	4th	6	0	1	1	2
2008	Canada	WJC	1st place, gold medalist(s)	7	2	3	5	2
Junior totals				13	2	4	6	4

== Awards and honours ==
Award	Year
OHL
First All-Star Team	2008
Memorial Cup George Parsons Trophy	2008
