= Jamie Arniel =

Canadian ice hockey player (born 1989)

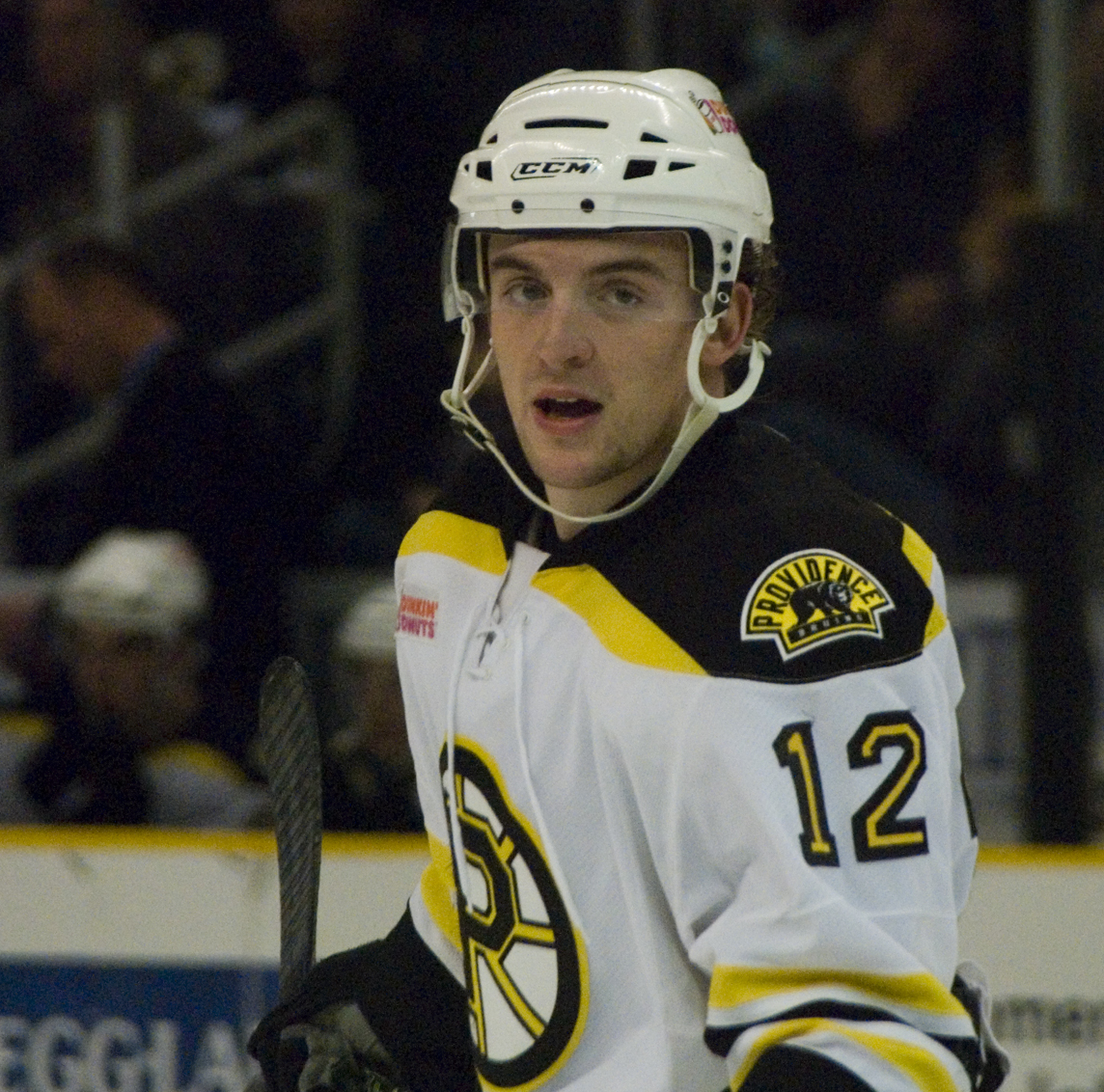
- Arniel with the Providence Bruins in 2011
- Born: November 16, 1989 (age 36) Kingston, Ontario, Canada
- Height: 5 ft 11 in (180 cm)
- Weight: 195 lb (88 kg; 13 st 13 lb)
- Position: Centre
- Shoots: Right
- EIHL team Former teams: Cardiff Devils; Providence Bruins; Boston Bruins; Eisbären Berlin; Lukko; Dornbirn Bulldogs; Vienna Capitals; Augsburger Panther; HC Bolzano; EC Bad Nauheim; Bratislava Capitals; HK Poprad; Kassel Huskies
- NHL draft: 97th overall, 2008; Boston Bruins
- Playing career: 2009–present

James Gregory Arniel (born November 16, 1989) is a Canadian ice hockey centre who signed to play for the Cardiff Devils in June 2023 after spending the previous winter playing for Kassel Huskies of the DEL2.

Arniel was drafted by the Boston Bruins in the fourth round (97th overall) of the 2008 NHL entry draft and played one game for them during the 2010–11 season. He is the nephew of Scott Arniel.

== Playing career ==
June 22, 2008 after being drafted in the 4th round 97th overall by the Boston Bruins, Arniel was out celebrating and got behind the wheel of his vehicle after attending stages nightclub in his hometown of Kingston, Ontario. Arniel blew 2.5 times the legal limit and was arrested and charged with a DUI.

On November 9, 2010, the Boston Bruins recalled Arniel on an emergency basis from the AHL's Providence Bruins, and on November 28, 2010, Arniel made his NHL debut, suiting up for the Bruins in an away game against the Atlanta Thrashers. He was awarded a Stanley Cup ring and included on team picture for his play. However, Arniel did not qualify to have name engraved on the Stanley Cup (41 regular season game, or 1 game in the finals).

On August 20, 2012, Arniel signed in Europe to a one-year contract with Eisbären Berlin of the German DEL. In his second European season, Arniel transferred from Lukko Rauma of the Finnish Liiga, to Dornbirner EC of the Austrian EBEL.

Having joined the Vienna Capitals for the 2018–19 season, Arniel continued in the EBEL scoring 11 points through 19 games. On February 14, 2019, Arniel was mutually released from his contract in returning to the DEL in joining Augsburger Panther for the remainder of the campaign.

Arniel returned to the EBEL the following summer, signing a one-year deal with Italian outfit, HC Bolzano, on August 2, 2019.

== Career statistics ==
=== Regular season and playoffs ===
			Regular season					Playoffs
Season	Team	League	GP	G	A	Pts	PIM	GP	G	A	Pts	PIM
2004–05	Kingston Predators	ODHA	44	34	50	84	26	—	—	—	—	—
2004–05	Kingston Voyageurs	OPJHL	3	0	0	0	0	—	—	—	—	—
2005–06	Guelph Storm	OHL	61	11	8	19	30	15	2	0	2	4
2006–07	Guelph Storm	OHL	68	31	31	62	51	4	2	2	4	0
2007–08	Guelph Storm	OHL	20	9	4	13	16	—	—	—	—	—
2007–08	Sarnia Sting	OHL	40	18	16	34	22	9	2	2	4	6
2008–09	Sarnia Sting	OHL	63	32	36	68	28	5	1	2	3	4
2008–09	Providence Bruins	AHL	—	—	—	—	—	8	1	0	1	0
2009–10	Providence Bruins	AHL	67	12	16	28	16	—	—	—	—	—
2010–11	Boston Bruins	NHL	1	0	0	0	0	—	—	—	—	—
2010–11	Providence Bruins	AHL	78	23	27	50	26	—	—	—	—	—
2011–12	Providence Bruins	AHL	74	7	17	24	26	—	—	—	—	—
2012–13	Eisbären Berlin	DEL	50	8	9	17	4	13	0	5	5	16
2013–14	Lukko	FIN	3	0	0	0	0	—	—	—	—	—
2013–14	Dornbirner EC	EBEL	29	11	26	37	10	6	4	3	7	2
2014–15	Dornbirner EC	EBEL	54	22	27	49	32	—	—	—	—	—
2015–16	Dornbirner EC	EBEL	53	12	30	42	20	6	2	3	5	2
2016–17	Dornbirner EC	EBEL	53	19	25	44	36	—	—	—	—	—
2017–18	Dornbirn Bulldogs	EBEL	54	17	27	44	32	6	3	3	6	6
2018–19	Vienna Capitals	EBEL	19	3	8	11	4	—	—	—	—	—
2018–19	Augsburger Panther	DEL	2	0	0	0	0	5	1	1	2	2
2019–20	HC Bolzano	EBEL	42	7	22	29	28	3	1	0	1	2
2020–21	EC Bad Nauheim	DEL2	49	29	33	62	22	—	—	—	—	—
2021–22	Bratislava Capitals	ICEHL	14	4	7	11	6	—	—	—	—	—
2021–22	HK Poprad	SVK	37	20	21	41	16	7	2	1	3	4
2022–23	Kassel Huskies	DEL2	47	17	31	48	18	10	2	2	4	0
AHL totals			219	42	60	102	68	8	1	0	1	0
NHL totals			1	0	0	0	0	—	—	—	—	—

== See also ==
- List of players who played only one game in the NHL
