= Mike Murphy (ice hockey, born 1989) =

Canadian ice hockey player and coach

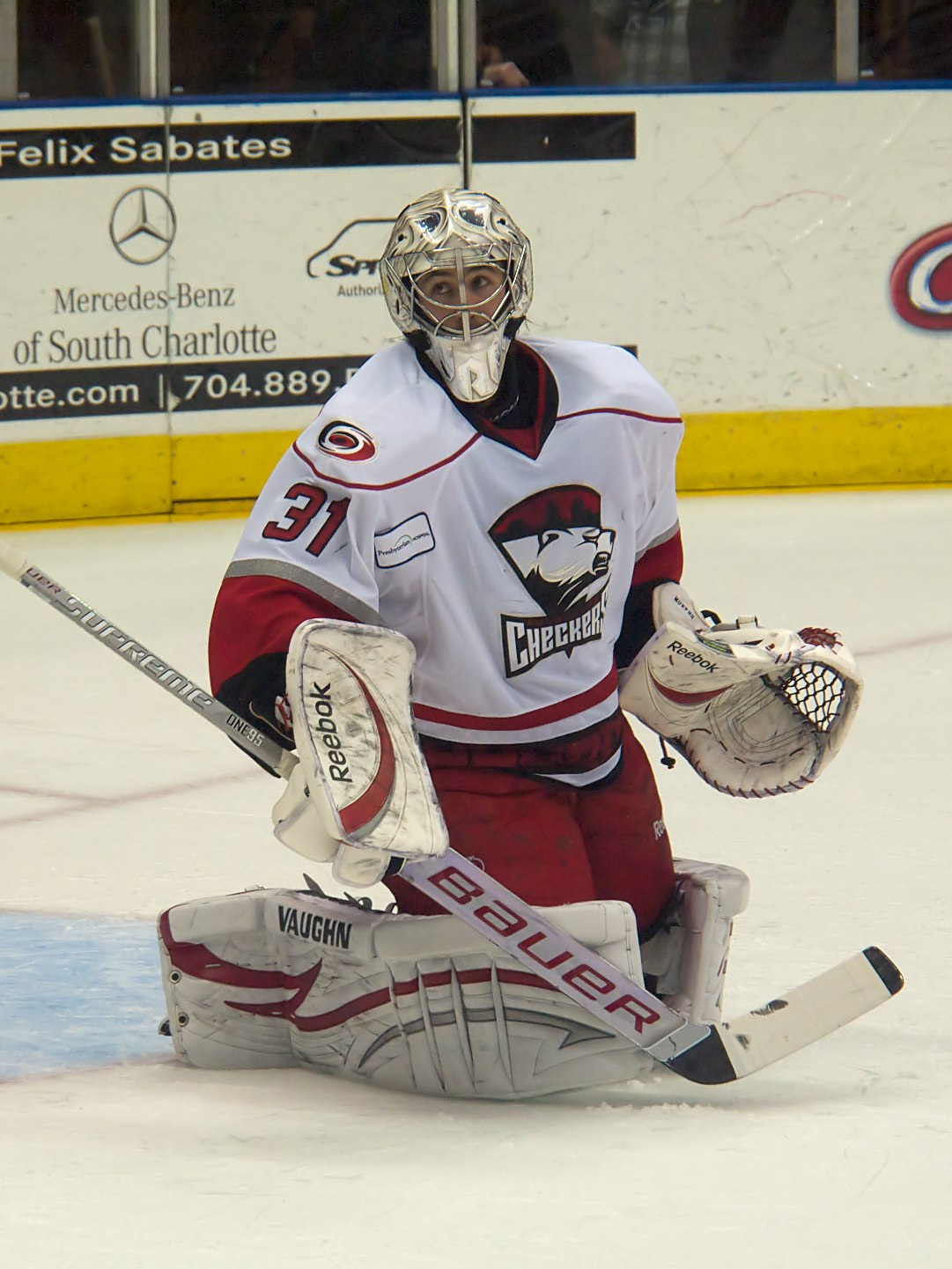
- Murphy with the Charlotte Checkers in 2011
- Born: January 15, 1989 (age 37) Inverary, Ontario, Canada
- Height: 5 ft 11 in (180 cm)
- Weight: 165 lb (75 kg; 11 st 11 lb)
- Position: Goaltender
- Caught: Left
- Played for: Carolina Hurricanes; Spartak Moscow; Dornbirner EC
- NHL draft: 165th overall, 2008; Carolina Hurricanes
- Playing career: 2009–2015

Michael Murphy (born January 15, 1989) is a Canadian former professional ice hockey goaltender. Murphy is currently an assistant coach for the Queen's Golden Gaels women's ice hockey. He last played with Dornbirner EC of the Austrian Hockey League (EBEL).

Murphy has the unique distinction of being the only goalie in league history to record a regulation loss before allowing a goal in his career, which he achieved during a 7–6 loss to the Calgary Flames on December 6, 2011.

== Playing career ==
Murphy was selected by the Carolina Hurricanes in the sixth round of the 2008 NHL entry draft with the 165th overall pick. On March 18, 2009, he signed a three-year, entry-level contract with the Hurricanes. In 2007–08, Murphy led the Belleville Bulls to the finals of the J. Ross Robertson Cup, the OHL championship series, but they lost Game 7 to the Kitchener Rangers.

He became the first back-to-back winner of the OHL Goaltender of the Year award on April 27, 2009, after being awarded the honor for the second straight year.

On December 6, 2011, Murphy was temporarily promoted to the Carolina Hurricanes from their AHL affiliate, the Charlotte Checkers. That same night, Murphy became the first goalie in NHL history to record a loss before allowing his first NHL goal against.

On June 6, 2012, Murphy left the Hurricanes and signed a one-year deal in the Russian Kontinental Hockey League with Spartak Moscow. During the 2012–13 season, Murphy started in only 7 games with Spartak before opting for a release to return to the Charlotte Checkers on March 26, 2013.

On July 11, 2013, Murphy was officially returned to the Carolina Hurricanes system, signing to a one-year, two-way contract.

On June 16, 2014, Murphy opted to return to Europe in signing a one-year contract with Austrian club, Dornbirner EC of the EBEL. Murphy made 7 appearances for 1 win with the Bulldogs, before he was released from his contract on November 4, 2014.

== Career statistics ==
=== Regular season and playoffs ===
			Regular season									Playoffs
Season	Team	League	GP	W	L	OTL	MIN	GA	SO	GAA	SV%	GP	W	L	MIN	GA	SO	GAA	SV%
2005–06	Kingston Voyageurs	OPJHL	33	16	13	2	—	102	3	3.30	—	4	0	3	174	19	0	.665	—
2005–06	Belleville Bulls	OHL	3	1	1	0	93	9	0	5.80	.842	—	—	—	—	—	—	—	—
2006–07	Belleville Bulls	OHL	18	8	6	2	995	61	0	3.68	.900	—	—	—	—	—	—	—	—
2007–08	Belleville Bulls	OHL	49	36	7	4	2942	110	3	2.24	.929	19	14	3	1085	42	1	2.32	.927
2008–09	Belleville Bulls	OHL	54	40	9	4	3169	110	5	2.08	.941	17	10	7	1007	43	0	2.56	.916
2009–10	Albany River Rats	AHL	20	10	9	0	1109	52	2	2.81	.917	—	—	—	—	—	—	—	—
2010–11	Charlotte Checkers	AHL	39	21	11	3	2159	91	2	2.53	.919	14	7	0	817	35	1	2.57	.919
2011–12	Charlotte Checkers	AHL	37	18	15	2	2039	93	1	2.74	.908	—	—	—	—	—	—	—	—
2011–12	Carolina Hurricanes	NHL	2	0	1	0	36	0	0	0.00	1.000	—	—	—	—	—	—	—	—
2012–13	Spartak Moscow	KHL	7	1	5	0	317	23	0	4.34	.877	—	—	—	—	—	—	—	—
2012–13	Charlotte Checkers	AHL	1	0	1	0	60	5	0	5.04	.857	1	0	0	35	4	0	6.95	.800
2013–14	Charlotte Checkers	AHL	19	4	11	0	931	62	0	3.99	.881	—	—	—	—	—	—	—	—
2014–15	Dornbirner EC	EBEL	7	1	5	0	350	23	0	3.94	.846	—	—	—	—	—	—	—	—
NHL totals			2	0	1	0	36	0	0	0.00	1.000	—	—	—	—	—	—	—	—

== Awards and honors ==
- Named to the OHL First team All-Star in 2008.
- OHL first All-rookie team award
- OHL first All-star team award
- OHL Dave Pinkney Trophy (top team goaltending)
- Canadian major second All-star award
- Canadian major junior goaltender of the year
- 2008 OHL Goaltender of the Year
- 2009 OHL Goaltender of the Year
- 2009 CHL Goaltender of the Year
