= Stefan Legein =

Canadian ice hockey player

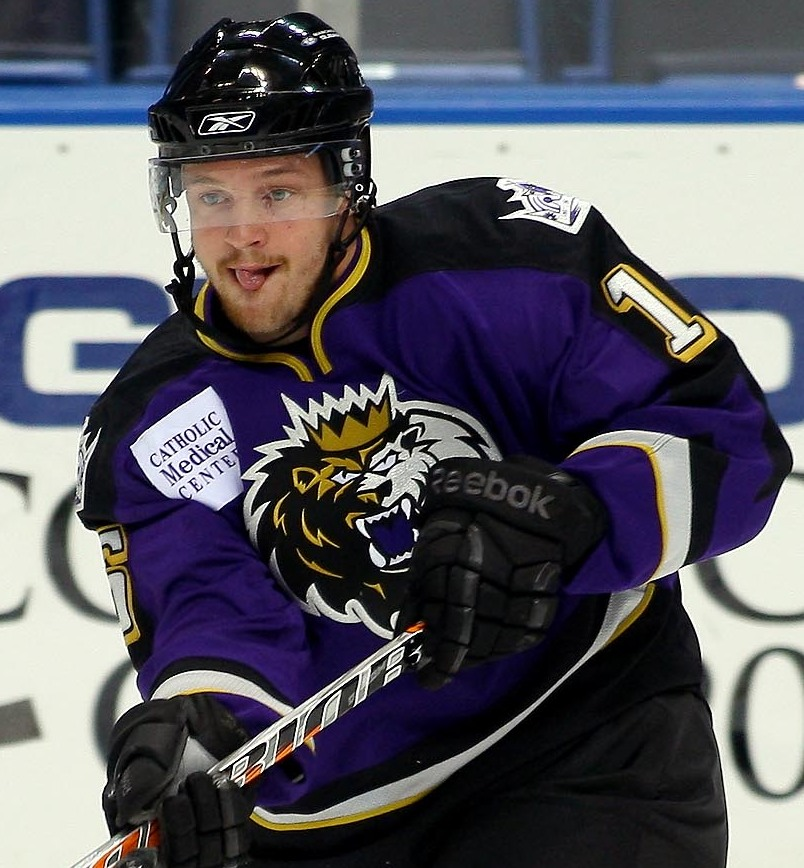
- Legein with the Manchester Monarchs in 2011
- Born: November 24, 1988 (age 37) Oakville, Ontario, Canada
- Height: 5 ft 10 in (178 cm)
- Weight: 170 lb (77 kg; 12 st 2 lb)
- Position: Right wing
- Shot: Right
- Played for: Syracuse Crunch; Adirondack Phantoms; Manchester Monarchs; Toronto Marlies; VIK Västerås HK; Heilbronner Falken
- NHL draft: 37th overall, 2007; Columbus Blue Jackets
- Playing career: 2008–2016

Stefan Legein (born November 24, 1988) is a Canadian former professional ice hockey right winger and current assistant coach for the Belleville Senators, the American Hockey League affiliate of the Ottawa Senators. He was drafted by the Columbus Blue Jackets in the 2nd round, 37th overall of the 2007 NHL entry draft.

== Playing career ==
Legein spent most of his junior career in the OHL, playing only one year in another league, the Ontario Provincial Junior A Hockey League (OPJHL) before being drafted by the Columbus Blue Jackets. Legein participated in the 2007 CHL Top Prospects Game and the OHL Eastern Conference All-Star Team in 2007, where he won the fastest skater competition, completing a single lap in 14.109 seconds. He also recorded 3 points in the game (2 goals, 1 assist). Prior to the 2008-09 season, Legein made headlines following his announcement to retire from the game though no official reason was announced, later that season, he announced that he would like to return to the game and joined the Syracuse Crunch of the AHL for the remainder of the season.

On October 20, 2009, Legein was traded by the Blue Jackets to the Philadelphia Flyers for fellow minor leaguer, Mike Ratchuk. Legein was later traded on October 12, 2011, along with a 2012 sixth-round draft pick, to the Los Angeles Kings for future considerations.

On October 5, 2013, the Toronto Marlies of the American Hockey League signed Legein to a professional tryout contract. In the 2013–14 season, Legein appeared in 7 games with the Marlies before opting to sign for the remainder of the season in Sweden with VIK Västerås HK of the second division, HockeyAllsvenskan. In the following season, Legein belatedly signed in Germany with DEL2 club, Heilbronner Falken.

On September 2, 2015, Legein returned to the United States and signed a one-year contract with Los Angeles Kings now ECHL affiliate, the Manchester Monarchs. He ended his career playing semi-professionally for the Stoney Creek Generals who compete for the Allan Cup in the 2016–17 season.

== International play ==
Medal record

Men's ice hockey

Representing Canada

World Junior Championships
Gold medal – first place	2008 Czech Republic	

In 2007, Legein was a member of Team Canada in the 2007 Super Series against Russia. Legein was later selected to be a member of Team Canada in the 2008 World Junior Ice Hockey Championships in Pardubice, Czech Republic.

== Career statistics ==
=== Regular season and playoffs ===
			Regular season					Playoffs
Season	Team	League	GP	G	A	Pts	PIM	GP	G	A	Pts	PIM
2004–05	Mississauga IceDogs	OHL	49	3	5	8	37	5	0	1	1	0
2004–05	Milton Icehawks	OPJHL	26	7	12	19	18	—	—	—	—	—
2005–06	Mississauga IceDogs	OHL	59	7	9	16	101	—	—	—	—	—
2006–07	Mississauga IceDogs	OHL	64	43	32	75	115	5	3	2	5	0
2007–08	Niagara IceDogs	OHL	30	24	13	37	80	10	7	11	18	28
2007–08	Syracuse Crunch	AHL	—	—	—	—	—	2	0	0	0	0
2008–09	Syracuse Crunch	AHL	26	1	0	1	4	—	—	—	—	—
2009–10	Syracuse Crunch	AHL	6	2	1	3	0	—	—	—	—	—
2009–10	Adirondack Phantoms	AHL	71	24	10	34	48	—	—	—	—	—
2010–11	Adirondack Phantoms	AHL	41	5	12	17	24	—	—	—	—	—
2010–11	Greenville Road Warriors	ECHL	2	0	0	0	2	—	—	—	—	—
2011–12	Manchester Monarchs	AHL	63	14	11	25	44	4	2	0	2	15
2012–13	Manchester Monarchs	AHL	51	5	12	17	32	1	0	0	0	0
2013–14	Toronto Marlies	AHL	7	3	0	3	8	—	—	—	—	—
2013–14	VIK Västerås HK	Allsv	22	5	4	9	33	1	0	0	0	0
2014–15	Heilbronner Falken	DEL2	16	3	4	7	32	—	—	—	—	—
2015–16	Manchester Monarchs	ECHL	38	8	13	21	53	—	—	—	—	—
2015–16	Tulsa Oilers	ECHL	11	0	2	2	14	—	—	—	—	—
2016–17	Stoney Creek Generals	ACH	13	2	7	9	16	—	—	—	—	—
AHL totals			265	54	46	100	160	7	2	0	2	15

=== International ===
Year	Team	Event	Result	GP	G	A	Pts	PIM
2008	Canada	WJC	1st place, gold medalist(s)	7	1	1	2	8
Junior totals				7	1	1	2	8

== Awards and honours ==
Award	Year
OHL
Second all-star team	2008
