= Tim Billingsley =

British ice hockey player (born 1990)

- Born: 17 January 1990 (age 35); Ottawa, Ontario, Canada
- Height: 1.88 m (6 ft 2 in)
- Weight: 91 kg (201 lb; 14 st 5 lb)
- Position: Defence
- Shoots: Right
- EIHL team Former teams: Nottingham Panthers; Brampton Beast
- National team: Great Britain
- NHL draft: 189th overall, 2008; Phoenix Coyotes
- Playing career: 2015–present

Tim Billingsley (born 17 January 1990) is a former British ice hockey player who most recently played for the Nottingham Panthers and the British national team.

He represented Great Britain at the 2019 IIHF World Championship.
