= CIBC Place =

Arena in Belleville, Ontario, Canada

- Front facade of the arena displaying the CIBC Place signage

- Location within Ontario Location within Canada
- Former names: Quinte Sports Centre (1978–1996); Yardmen Arena (1996–2018); CAA Arena (2018–2026)
- Address: 265 Cannifton Road
- Location: Belleville, Ontario
- Coordinates: 44.1880°N 77.3837°W
- Owner: City of Belleville
- Operator: City of Belleville
- Capacity: Ice hockey: 4,365
- Surface: Mechanically-frozen ice
- Field size: 200 feet (61 m) X 85 feet (26 m)

Construction
- Groundbreaking: 1976
- Opened: 1978
- Renovated: 2016

Tenants
- Belleville Bulls (OHL) (1981–2015); Belleville Senators (AHL) (2017–present)

CIBC Place is a 4,365-seat multi-purpose arena in Belleville, Ontario, Canada. It opened in 1978 as the Quinte Sports Centre, and was later known as Yardmen Arena from 1996 until 2018, as CAA Arena from 2018 to 2026, and became CIBC Place in October 2026. It is the home of the Belleville Senators of the American Hockey League (AHL). It is part of a recreational complex with ice rinks and a pool, known as the Quinte Sports and Wellness Centre.

== Description ==
The arena was built with an international-size ice surface of 200 ft (61 m) length by 100 ft (30 m) width. It was the largest ice surface in the Ontario Hockey League. This has since been converted to a standard NHL-sized rink. The arena is one of four ice rinks in the Quinte Sports & Wellness Centre complex.

The arena has two balconies, on opposite sides of the ice. It was the only arena in the Ontario Hockey League to have a second level of seating until Budweiser Gardens was built in London, Ontario in 2002.

== History ==
The arena was opened in 1978. The Yardmen Arena name was in honour of a small group of railroaders known as "The Belleville Yardmen" who raised more than CA$3 million to contribute to its construction. The Belleville Bulls started as a Junior Tier II team in the OHA. On February 2, 1981, the OHL granted an expansion franchise to the city of Belleville and the ownership group of Dr. Robert L. Vaughan & Bob Dolan, and the Bulls joined the OHL. The team played in the arena until 2015, when it was sold and moved to Hamilton. The Yardmen Arena has hosted the OHL All-Star Game twice, in 1983 and 2006.

Yardmen Arena hosted an NHL pre-season game between the Washington Capitals and Winnipeg Jets on September 14, 2013 as part of the Kraft Hockeyville festivities. Nearby Stirling-Rawdon won the Kraft Hockeyville contest in 2012, but the original game scheduled between the Toronto Maple Leafs and Columbus Blue Jackets was cancelled due to the 2012-13 NHL lockout.

During the 2015–16 hockey season, Yardmen Arena hosted three Federal Hockey League games, with the intent of the league exploring the location for a team. If Belleville had been given a franchise, their nearest opponent would have been the Watertown Wolves across the US/Canada border, about 100 miles away in Watertown, New York. The games all had the Berlin River Drivers as the home team against and the Port Huron Prowlers on December 12, the Danbury Titans on January 2, and the Dayton Demolition on February 13.

In summer 2016, it was reported that the Ottawa Senators were considering moving their American Hockey League affiliate, then known as the Binghamton Senators, to Yardmen Arena for the 2017–18 AHL season. Upgrades would have to be made to accommodate an AHL franchise including repairing the boards, the floor refrigeration system, and increasing the arena's capacity. The transfer was confirmed in September 2016, after Belleville City Council approved a $20.5 million upgrade to the arena. The upgrades included an increase in capacity, a new NHL-sized rink, new home team dressing room, new refrigeration system, new score clock, new washrooms and a new public entrance and in effect lead to a rebuilding of the arena. The Belleville Senators agreed to a lease for eight years. The team played their first month of the 2017–18 AHL season on the road and opened their inaugural season at the Yardmen Arena on November 1, 2017, to a sold out crowd.

On September 19, 2018, the Senators sold the naming rights to the arena and it became officially known as CAA Arena for the 2018–19 season. The naming rights contract was for seven years.

On October 2, 2026, ahead of the franchises 10th season in the Bay of Quinte region, the Belleville Senators announced a new multi-year naming rights partnership with CIBC, officially renaming the facility CIBC Place.

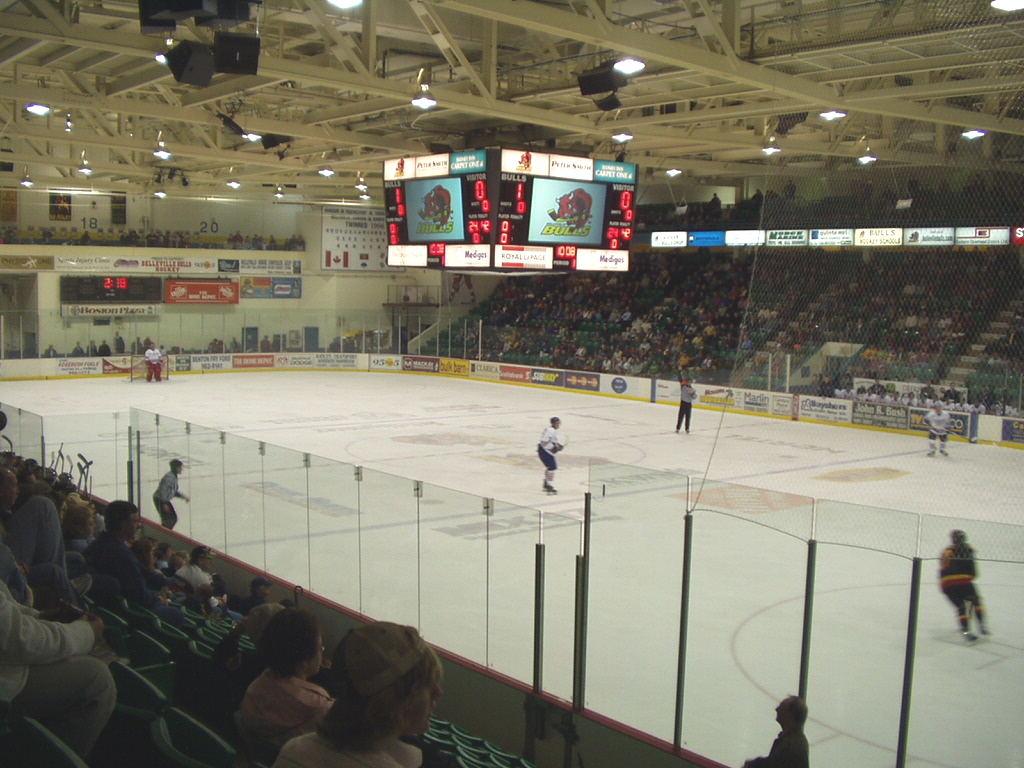
Interior of Yardmen Arena prior to the 2017 renovations.

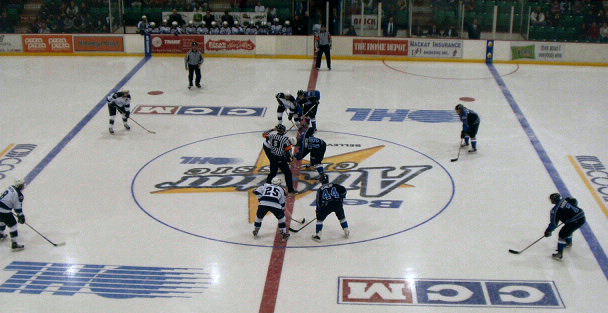
OHL All-Star Game 2006 Opening Face Off.
February 1, 2006.

== Quinte Sports and Wellness Centre ==
As well as the CIBC Place, the City of Belleville operates three other, smaller arenas for ice hockey teams and rentals.

- Family Dental Centre Arena
- Mackay Insurance Arena
- Wally Dever Arena

The complex also includes the Templeman Aquatic Centre, which includes three pools:

- Main Pool
- Therapy Pool
- Pre-school Pool

A seasonal outdoor pool and splash pad is also part of the complex.

Source: City of Belleville
