= Jakub Svoboda =

Czech ice hockey player

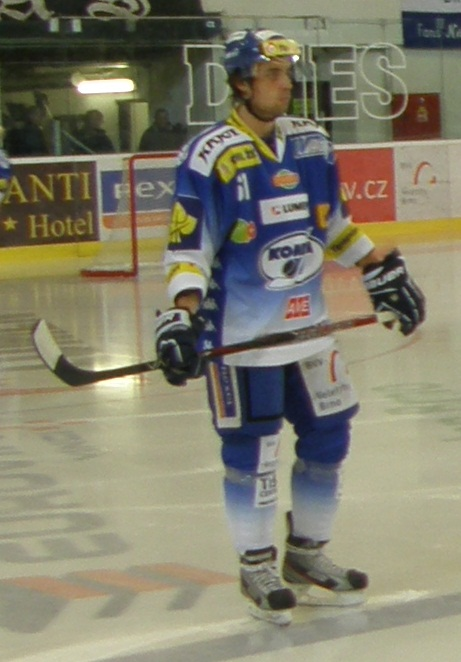
- Born: 27 December 1989 (age 36) Přerov, Czechoslovakia
- Height: 6 ft 2 in (188 cm)
- Weight: 209 lb (95 kg; 14 st 13 lb)
- Position: Left wing
- Shoots: Right
- Czechia2 team Former teams: HC ZUBR Přerov; HC Kometa Brno; HC Zlín; HC Dynamo Pardubice; HC Energie Karlovy Vary
- NHL draft: Undrafted
- Playing career: 2009–present

Jakub Svoboda (born 27 December 1989 in Přerov) is a Czech professional ice hockey player who currently plays with HC ZUBR Přerov in the 1st Czech Republic Hockey League. He previously played for HC Kometa Brno in the Czech Extraliga.
