= Mike Duco =

Canadian ice hockey player (born 1987)

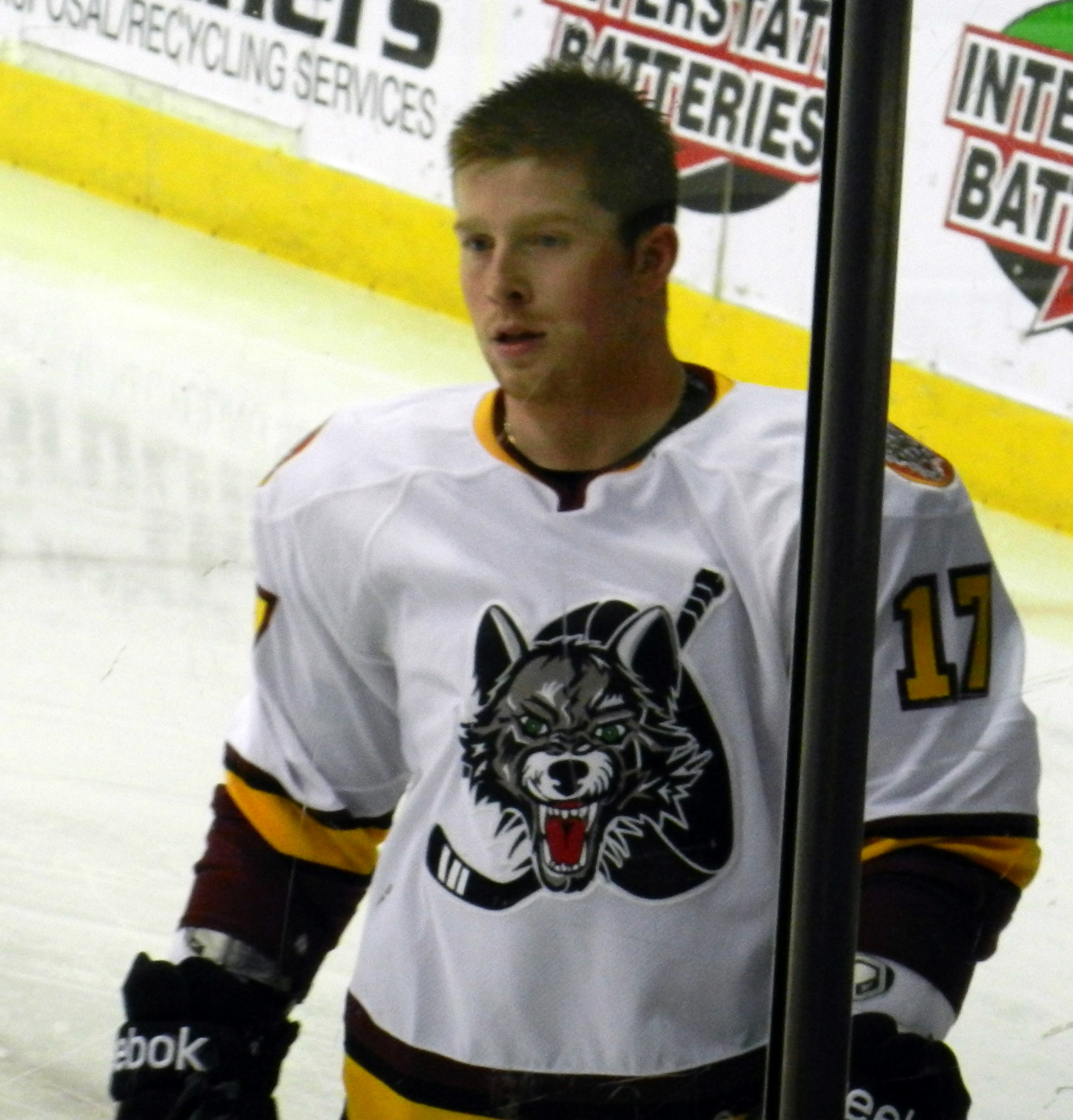
- Duco with the Chicago Wolves in 2011
- Born: July 8, 1987 (age 39) Toronto, Ontario, Canada
- Height: 5 ft 10 in (178 cm)
- Weight: 194 lb (88 kg; 13 st 12 lb)
- Position: Left wing
- Shot: Left
- Played for: Florida Panthers; Vancouver Canucks; EC Red Bull Salzburg; Sheffield Steelers
- NHL draft: Undrafted
- Playing career: 2008–2017

Michael Duco (born July 8, 1987) is a Canadian former professional ice hockey player. Duco played 18 games in the National Hockey League with the Florida Panthers and Vancouver Canucks between 2009 and 2012, spending most of his professional career in the minor-league American Hockey League and ECHL. Prior to becoming a professional, Duco spent five seasons with the Kitchener Rangers of the major junior Ontario Hockey League. After retiring from playing in 2017, Duco became the interim head coach of the Elmira Jackals in the ECHL; subsequently, he was the last coach of the team before it folded.

== Playing career ==
As a youth, Duco played in the 2001 Quebec International Pee-Wee Hockey Tournament with a minor ice hockey team from Vaughan.

=== Junior ===
Duco began his Ontario Hockey League (OHL) career late in the 2003–04 season with the Kitchener Rangers. In five games Duco registered one goal and two assists and added another assist in three playoff games. In his first full season Duco recorded 24 goals and 50 points in 62 games. He also registered a +16 rating, eight power play goals, and two shorthanded goals. At season's end Duco was named to the OHL's All-Rookie Second Team. Prior to the 2005–06 season Duco was invited to the Edmonton Oilers training camp. He failed to make the team or be given a contract and returned to Kitchener. There his overall production dipped to 22 goals and 44 points, but he increased his power play goal total to 11. In the post-season Duco added 2 goals and an assist in 5 games. The following year, he was again invited to Oilers camp where he was unable to gain a contract and was reassigned to the Rangers. During the 2006–07 season Duco registered his third straight 20 goal season, but his production dropped for a second consecutive season registering 40 points. In the playoffs Duco notched a goal and an assist in nine post-season games. In the off-season Duco was invited to the Florida Panthers training camp in Kitchener. His performance at this camp earned him an invite to the Panthers main training camp, where he played in one pre-season game and was signed to an entry-level contract. Duco was reassigned to Kitchner for his overage season and set career highs in goals, 32, points, 54, and penalty minutes (PIM), 173.

=== Professional ===
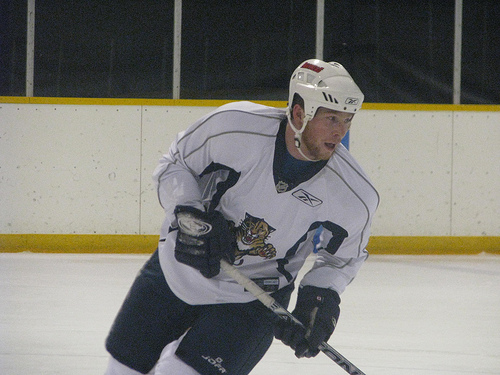
Duco during his tenure with the Florida Panthers

Duco played his first professional season with the Panthers American Hockey League (AHL) affiliate the Rochester Americans in the 2008–09 season. He finished the year with 14 goals, 28 points and 141 PIMs. Duco ranked fifth on the team in goal scoring while leading the club in penalty minutes. The following season Duco began the year with Rochester but was called up by the Panthers where he made his NHL debut on December 2, 2009, in a game against the Colorado Avalanche. He finished the year playing in 10 NHL games without recording a goal or an assist but notched 50 PIMs, in the AHL he recorded 9 goals and 19 points in 59 games.

In the off-season he was re-signed by the Panthers to a one-year deal. In the 2010–11 season Duco had a professional career high with 20 goals in 67 games for the Americans, but managed to play in only two games for the Panthers. His 20 goals led Rochester. At the end of the season Duco became a restricted free agent and the Panthers tendered him a qualifying offer.

During the off-season, on July 9, 2011, his rights were traded by the Panthers to the Vancouver Canucks for the rights to Russian winger Sergei Shirokov. Five days later he signed a contract with Vancouver. He played six games for the Canucks in the 2011–12 season, spending most of the season with the Canuck's American League affiliate Chicago Wolves. The Canucks declined to re-sign Duco following the season, making him an unrestricted free agent. Duco then joined Red Bull Salzburg of the Austrian League for the final 21 games of the 2012–13 season.

In September 2013, the Toronto Marlies of the American Hockey League announced the signing of Duco to a Training Camp Tryout agreement, then later to a one-year agreement.

On October 6, 2014, Duco signed as a free agent to a one-year ECHL contract with the Indy Fuel in their inaugural season in 2014–15. At the conclusion of the season with the Fuel, Duco opted to return to Europe, signing a one-year contract with English club, the Sheffield Steelers of the EIHL on June 14, 2015.

== Playing style ==
At 5 foot 10 inches tall, Duco was small for a power forward, but played an aggressive physical style with a willingness to fight. He played an energetic game, and was known to finish his checks, and could be an agitator. Peter DeBoer, who coached Duco, said that Duco didn't play small but rather played like a player a foot taller.

== Career statistics ==
=== Regular season and playoffs ===
			Regular season					Playoffs
Season	Team	League	GP	G	A	Pts	PIM	GP	G	A	Pts	PIM
2001–02	Streetsville Derbys	OPJHL	41	5	6	11	18	—	—	—	—	—
2002–03	Toronto Marlboros AAA	Midget	32	27	33	60	160	—	—	—	—	—
2003–04	Stouffville Spirit	OPJHL	7	3	2	5	15	—	—	—	—	—
2003–04	Thornhill Rattlers	OPJHL	37	25	30	55	50	—	—	—	—	—
2003–04	Kitchener Rangers	OHL	5	1	2	3	4	4	0	1	1	4
2004–05	Kitchener Rangers	OHL	62	24	26	50	78	15	0	0	0	11
2005–06	Kitchener Rangers	OHL	59	22	22	44	113	5	2	1	3	10
2006–07	Kitchener Rangers	OHL	54	20	20	40	121	9	1	1	2	12
2007–08	Kitchener Rangers	OHL	62	32	22	54	173	20	16	6	22	37
2008–09	Rochester Americans	AHL	68	14	14	28	147	—	—	—	—	—
2009–10	Florida Panthers	NHL	10	0	0	0	50	—	—	—	—	—
2009–10	Rochester Americans	AHL	59	9	10	19	111	7	1	0	1	18
2010–11	Florida Panthers	NHL	2	0	0	0	10	—	—	—	—	—
2010–11	Rochester Americans	AHL	67	20	11	31	126	—	—	—	—	—
2011–12	Vancouver Canucks	NHL	6	0	2	2	5	—	—	—	—	—
2011–12	Chicago Wolves	AHL	56	11	13	24	59	5	0	0	0	2
2012–13	EC Red Bull Salzburg	EBEL	15	4	2	6	17	6	2	0	2	2
2013–14	Toronto Marlies	AHL	17	2	3	5	32	—	—	—	—	—
2013–14	Orlando Solar Bears	ECHL	19	4	3	7	30	1	0	0	0	2
2014–15	Indy Fuel	ECHL	63	17	19	36	113	—	—	—	—	—
2015–16	Sheffield Steelers	EIHL	12	1	4	5	10	—	—	—	—	—
2015–16	Evansville Icemen	ECHL	25	11	5	16	42	—	—	—	—	—
AHL totals			267	56	51	107	475	12	1	0	1	20
NHL totals			18	0	2	2	65	—	—	—	—	—
