= Harrison Reed (ice hockey) =

Canadian ice hockey player (born 1988)

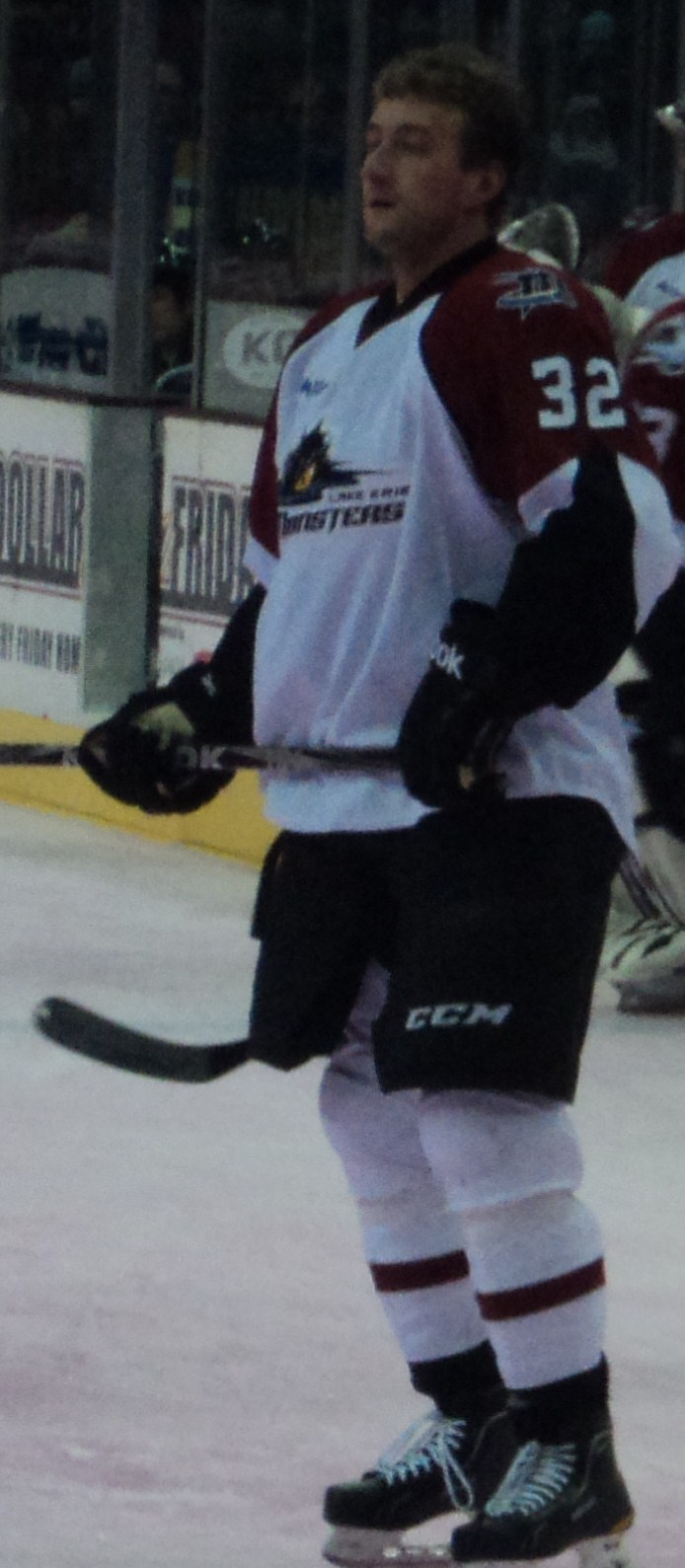
- Born: January 18, 1988 (age 38) Newmarket, Ontario, Canada
- Height: 6 ft 1 in (185 cm)
- Weight: 188 lb (85 kg; 13 st 6 lb)
- Position: Right wing
- Shoots: Right
- Ger.3 team Former teams: Hamburg Crocodiles; Albany River Rats; Lake Erie Monsters; Houston Aeros; Straubing Tigers; SønderjyskE Ishockey; Stavanger Oilers; UTE
- NHL draft: 93rd overall, 2006; Carolina Hurricanes
- Playing career: 2008–present

Harrison Reed (born January 18, 1988) is a Canadian professional ice hockey right winger who is currently playing for Hamburg Crocodiles in the Oberliga (Ger.3). In his career, he played 208 games in the AHL and 50 games in Deutsche Eishockey Liga.

== Playing career ==
Reed was drafted 93rd overall in the 2006 NHL entry draft by the Carolina Hurricanes. Reed played major junior hockey in the Ontario Hockey League with the London Knights, Sarnia Sting and Guelph Storm. After his final year of eligibility with the Storm in 2007–08, Harrison signed with the Hurricanes to a three-year entry-level contract on May 22, 2008.

Reed was assigned to AHL affiliate, the Albany River Rats for his first professional season in 2008–09. He played in 70 games scoring 9 points with the Rats and also played a solitary game with ECHL affiliate, the Florida Everblades.

Harrison started the 2009–10 season with the River Rats, along with a brief stint with the Everblades, before he was traded by the Hurricanes with Stephane Yelle to the Colorado Avalanche for Cedric Lalonde-McNicoll and a sixth-round draft pick on March 3, 2010. He was then assigned to Avalanche affiliate, the Lake Erie Monsters, for the remainder of the season.

On September 1, 2011, it was announced that Reed signed a contract with the Toledo Walleye of the ECHL. In the 2011–12 season, Reed scored a respectable 33 points in 52 games with the Walleye, earning two AHL try-out contracts with former team, the Lake Erie Monsters and the Houston Aeros.

A free agent, on September 5, 2012, Reed signed a one-year contract to remain in the ECHL with the Stockton Thunder. As a top line scoring threat for the Thunder, Reed produced at a point-per-game pace, with helped the Thunder reach the Kelly Cup finals. During the course of the 2012–13 season, Reed was loaned for his third stint with the Lake Erie Monsters appearing in 14 games for 2 points.

On July 31, 2013, Reed was signed to his first European contract, agreeing to a one-year deal with German club, Eispiraten Crimmitschau of the DEL2. In the inaugural season of the DEL2, Reed excelled offensively accounting for the majority of the Pirates offense, to lead the league with 40 goals and 90 points in 54 games. Despite his output he was unable to lift Crimmitschau from last position in the regular season, but he scored 27 points in 17 post-season games to ensure safety from relegation. He was selected as the DEL2 Forward of the Year for his efforts.

On April 24, 2014, Reed accepted a contract offer from DEL club Straubing Tigers for the following 2014–15 season. In the 2014–15 DEL season, he was the second leading scorer on his team, tallying 25 points.

For the 2015–16 season, Reed signed a contract with the DEL2 outfit Dresdner Eislöwen. There he played alongside Max Campbell like in the successful time with Eispiraten Crimmitschau. Reed scored 28 goals to go along with 26 assists in 67 DEL2 contests for the Eislöwen squad that season. He left Germany at the conclusion of the 2015-16 campaign to continue his career in the neighbouring country of Denmark, joining Metal Ligaen outfit SønderjyskE.

== Career statistics ==
			Regular season					Playoffs
Season	Team	League	GP	G	A	Pts	PIM	GP	G	A	Pts	PIM
2004–05	Petrolia Jets	WOHL	38	9	14	23	34	—	—	—	—	—
2004–05	London Knights	OHL	6	0	0	0	0	4	0	1	1	0
2005–06	Sarnia Sting	OHL	68	26	24	50	50	—	—	—	—	—
2006–07	Sarnia Sting	OHL	67	29	52	81	30	4	0	4	4	8
2007–08	Sarnia Sting	OHL	28	6	12	18	20	—	—	—	—	—
2007–08	Guelph Storm	OHL	41	8	21	29	20	10	3	2	5	12
2008–09	Albany River Rats	AHL	70	5	4	9	22	—	—	—	—	—
2008–09	Florida Everblades	ECHL	1	1	1	2	0	—	—	—	—	—
2009–10	Albany River Rats	AHL	49	1	5	6	10	—	—	—	—	—
2009–10	Florida Everblades	ECHL	9	5	8	13	9	—	—	—	—	—
2009–10	Lake Erie Monsters	AHL	17	0	1	1	19	—	—	—	—	—
2010–11	Lake Erie Monsters	AHL	38	3	0	3	8	4	0	0	0	0
2010–11	Tulsa Oilers	CHL	28	13	17	30	12	—	—	—	—	—
2011–12	Toledo Walleye	ECHL	52	16	17	33	28	—	—	—	—	—
2011–12	Lake Erie Monsters	AHL	4	0	2	2	0	—	—	—	—	—
2011–12	Houston Aeros	AHL	16	1	3	4	0	—	—	—	—	—
2012–13	Stockton Thunder	ECHL	46	21	24	45	32	23	9	11	20	10
2012–13	Lake Erie Monsters	AHL	14	1	1	2	6	—	—	—	—	—
2013–14	Eispiraten Crimmitschau	DEL2	54	40	50	90	98	—	—	—	—	—
2014–15	Straubing Tigers	DEL	50	12	13	25	22	—	—	—	—	—
2015–16	Dresdner Eislöwen	DEL2	52	23	29	52	22	15	5	7	12	8
2016–17	SønderjyskE	DEN	45	27	23	50	30	6	0	3	3	2
2017–18	Stavanger Oilers	NOR	11	2	1	3	4	—	—	—	—	—
2017–18	Dresdner Eislöwen	DEL2	9	5	6	11	6	2	0	0	0	2
2018–19	Dresdner Eislöwen	DEL2	48	14	38	52	16	5	1	1	2	4
2019–20	UTE	EL	27	15	20	35	20	6	3	4	7	4
2020–21	Hamburg Crocodiles	GER.3	19	11	12	23	12	5	3	4	7	10
2021–22	Hamburg Crocodiles	GER.3	46	30	47	77	28	3	1	2	3	2
2022–23	Hamburg Crocodiles	GER.3	52	36	34	70	40	3	1	3	4	2
AHL totals			208	11	16	27	65	4	0	0	0	0
DEL2 totals			163	82	123	205	142	22	6	8	14	14
