= 2012 Calder Cup playoffs =

North American ice hockey tournament

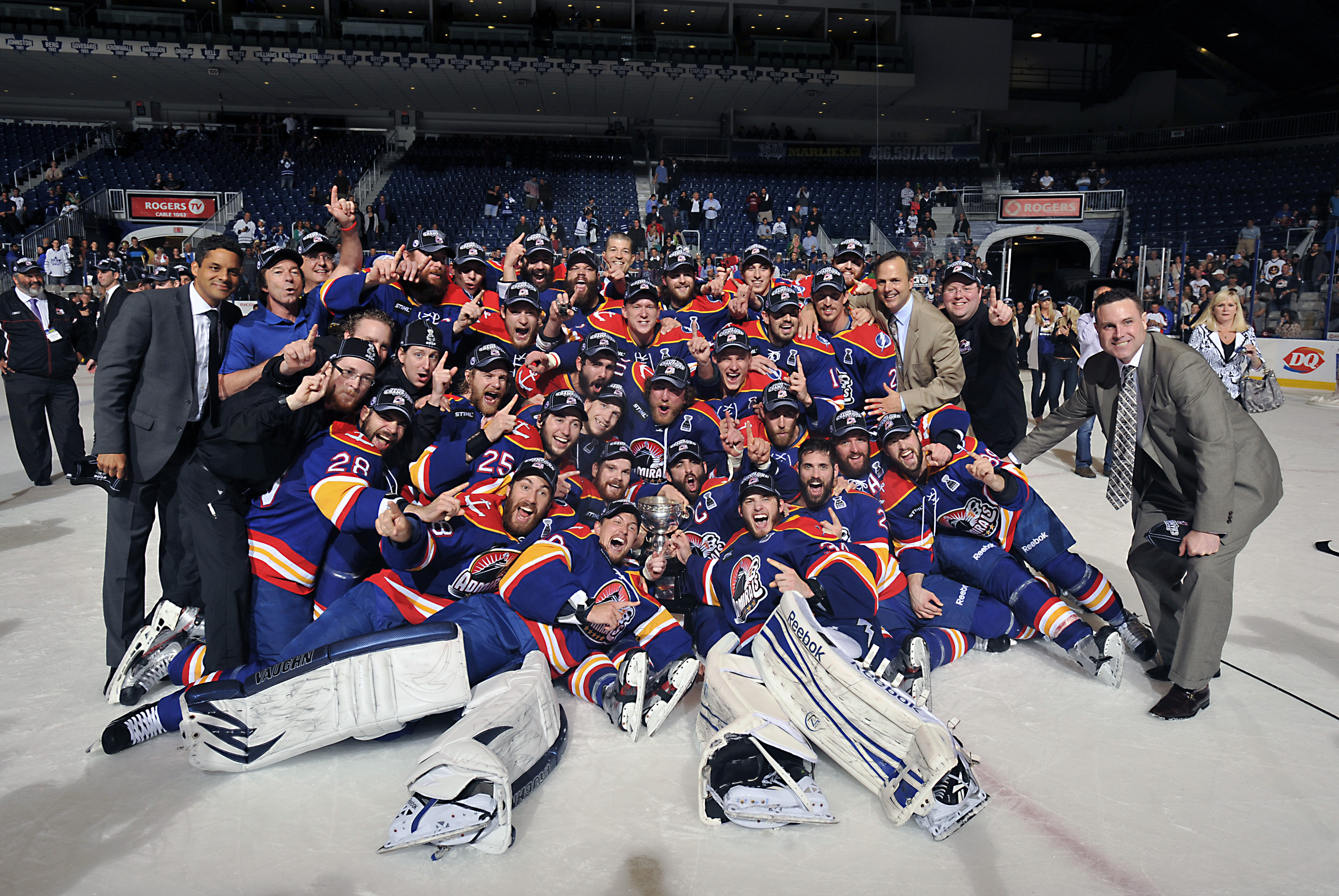
- The champion Norfolk Admirals

Tournament details
- Dates: April 19 – June 9, 2012
- Teams: 16

Final positions
- Champions: Norfolk Admirals
- Runners-up: Toronto Marlies

Tournament statistics
- Scoring leader(s): Alexandre Picard (Admirals) & Trevor Smith (Admirals) (16 points)

Awards
- MVP: Alexandre Picard (Admirals)

The 2012 Calder Cup playoffs of the American Hockey League began on April 19, 2012, with a slightly different playoff format than in other recent years. The sixteen teams that qualified, eight from each conference, will play a best-of-five series in the conference quarterfinals, and the playoffs will then continue with best-of-seven series for the conference semifinals, conference finals and Calder Cup finals.

The Norfolk Admirals defeated the Toronto Marlies in four games to win the Calder Cup for the first time in Norfolk's history.

== Playoff seeds ==
After the 2011–12 AHL regular season, 16 teams qualified for the playoffs. The top eight teams from each conference qualifies for the playoffs.

=== Eastern Conference ===
==== Atlantic Division ====
1. St. John's IceCaps – 94 points
2. Manchester Monarchs – 83 points

==== Northeast Division ====
1. Bridgeport Sound Tigers – 91 points
2. Connecticut Whale – 86 points

==== East Division ====
1. Norfolk Admirals – 113 points
2. Wilkes-Barre/Scranton Penguins – 95 points
3. Hershey Bears – 88 points
4. Syracuse Crunch – 84 points

=== Western Conference ===
==== North Division ====
1. Toronto Marlies – 96 points
2. Rochester Americans – 86 points (30 regulation and overtime wins, 1−1 in season series against Houston, +3 goal difference)

==== Midwest Division ====
1. Chicago Wolves – 91 points
2. Milwaukee Admirals – 87 points (36 regulation and overtime wins, 3−1 in season series against San Antonio)

==== West Division ====
1. Oklahoma City Barons – 99 points
2. Abbotsford Heat – 92 points
3. San Antonio Rampage – 87 points (36 regulation and overtime wins, 1−3 in season series against Milwaukee)
4. Houston Aeros – 86 points (30 regulation and overtime wins, 1−1 in season series against Rochester, −4 goal difference)

== Bracket ==
Conference quarterfinals
1	Norfolk	3
8	Manchester	1
2	St. John's	3
7	Syracuse	1
3	Bridgeport	0
6	Connecticut	3
4	Wilkes-Barre/Scranton	3
5	Hershey	2
1	Oklahoma City	3
8	Houston	1
2	Toronto	3
7	Rochester	0
3	Chicago	2
6	San Antonio	3
4	Abbotsford	3
5	Milwaukee	0

Conference semifinals
1	Norfolk	4
6	Connecticut	2
2	St. John's	4
4	Wilkes-Barre/Scranton	3
1	Oklahoma City	4
6	San Antonio	1
2	Toronto	4
4	Abbotsford	1

Conference finals
Eastern Conference
1	Norfolk	4
2	St. John's	0
Western Conference
1	Oklahoma City	1
2	Toronto	4

Calder Cup Final
E1	Norfolk	4
W2	Toronto	0

== Conference quarterfinals ==
Note 1: All times are in Eastern Time (UTC−4).
Note 2: Game times in italics signify games to be played only if necessary.
Note 3: Home team is listed first.

=== Eastern Conference ===
==== (1) Norfolk Admirals vs. (8) Manchester Monarchs ====
April 20	Norfolk Admirals	3 – 2	Manchester Monarchs	Norfolk Scope	Recap
Mark Barberio 1 – 6:39		First period	No scoring
Alexandre Picard 1 – pp – 1:42; Trevor Smith 1 – pp – 3:39		Second period	No scoring
No scoring		Third period	9:53 – sh – Stefan Legein 1; 13:57 – Marc-Andre Cliche 1
Jaroslav Janus 27 saves / 29 shots		Goalie stats	Jeff Zatkoff 10 saves / 13 shots Martin Jones 19 saves / 19 shots

April 21	Norfolk Admirals	2 – 5	Manchester Monarchs	Norfolk Scope	Recap
No scoring		First period	11:23 – Linden Vey 1; 17:12 – Brandon Kozun 1
Alexandre Picard 2 – 5:10; Alexandre Picard 3 – 10:02		Second period	No scoring
No scoring		Third period	5:28 – Robbie Czarnik 1; 16:16 – Linden Vey 2; 17:59 – en – Andy Andreoff 1
Jaroslav Janus 25 saves / 29 shots		Goalie stats	Martin Jones 37 saves / 39 shots

April 25	Manchester Monarchs	2 – 5	Norfolk Admirals	Verizon Wireless Arena	Recap
Robbie Czarnik 2 – 11:06		First period	0:35 – Brandon Segal 1; 7:40 – Pierre-Cedric Labrie 1
Stefan Legein 2 – 12:51		Second period	4:31 – Philip-Michael Devos 1
No scoring		Third period	14:45 – pp – Alexandre Picard 4; 18:32 – en – Brandon Segal 2
Martin Jones 28 saves / 32 shots		Goalie stats	Dustin Tokarski 25 saves / 27 shots

April 27	Manchester Monarchs	3 – 4	OT	Norfolk Admirals	Verizon Wireless Arena	Recap
Justin Azevedo 1 – 0:38		First period		No scoring
Patrick Mullen 1 – 11:18; Andy Andreoff 1 – pp – 15:37		Second period		7:18 – Evan Oberg 1; 16:58 – pp – Mark Barberio 2; 17:14 – Trevor Smith 2
No scoring		Third period		No scoring
No scoring		First overtime period		13:27 – Alexander Killorn 1
Jeff Zatkoff 35 saves / 39 shots		Goalie stats		Dustin Tokarski 22 saves / 25 shots

Norfolk won series 3–1

==== (2) St. John's IceCaps vs. (7) Syracuse Crunch ====
April 20	Syracuse Crunch	2 – 3	St. John's IceCaps	Oncenter War Memorial Arena	Recap
No scoring		First period	No scoring
Kyle Palmieri 1 – pp – 10:22		Second period	3:05 – Derek Meech 1
Mark Bell 1 – 10:35		Third period	12:22 – Aaron Gagnon 1; 18:38 – Jason King 1
Iiro Tarkki 26 saves / 29 shots		Goalie stats	Edward Pasquale 35 saves / 37 shots

April 21	Syracuse Crunch	4 – 3	St. John's IceCaps	Oncenter War Memorial Arena	Recap
Mark Bell 2 – 11:03		First period	0:41 – Aaron Gagnon 2
Mat Clark 1 – 0:41; John Mitchell 1 – 2:21		Second period	4:18 – Patrice Cormier 1
Brandon McMillan 1 – pp – 12:25		Third period	0:46 – pp – Aaron Gagnon 3
Iiro Tarkki 18 saves / 21 shots		Goalie stats	Edward Pasquale 36 saves / 40 shots

April 25	St. John's IceCaps	5 – 1	Syracuse Crunch	Mile One Centre	Recap
Patrice Cormier 2 – pp – 11:10; Derek Meech 2 – 17:21		First period	12:57 – Dan Sexton 1
Brock Trotter 1 – pp – 7:54		Second period	No scoring
John Albert 1 – 4:51; Ben Maxwell 1 – 16:35		Third period	No scoring
Edward Pasquale 40 saves / 41 shots		Goalie stats	Iiro Tarkki 33 saves / 38 shots

April 27	St. John's IceCaps	4 – 3	OT	Syracuse Crunch	Mile One Centre	Recap
No scoring		First period		5:12 – Mark Bell 3; 5:48 – Emerson Etem 1
Carl Klingberg 1 – 2:49; John Albert 2 – 4:20		Second period		15:35 – Emerson Etem 2
Raymond Sawada 1 – pp – 6:55		Third period		No scoring
Derek Meech 3 – 5:01		First overtime period		No scoring
Edward Pasquale 27 saves / 30 shots		Goalie stats		Iiro Tarkki 34 saves / 38 shots

St. John's won series 3–1

==== (3) Bridgeport Sound Tigers vs. (6) Connecticut Whale ====
April 19	Bridgeport Sound Tigers	0 – 3	Connecticut Whale	Webster Bank Arena	Recap
No scoring		First period	No scoring
No scoring		Second period	No scoring
No scoring		Third period	1:03 – Kelsey Tessier 1; 9:38 – Jordan Owens 1; 13:18 – Ryan Bourque 1
Kevin Poulin 33 saves / 36 shots		Goalie stats	Cam Talbot 42 saves / 42 shots

April 21	Bridgeport Sound Tigers	0 – 3	Connecticut Whale	Webster Bank Arena	Recap
No scoring		First period	5:32 – Jonathan Audy-Marchessault 1
No scoring		Second period	6:44 – Marek Hrivik 1
No scoring		Third period	14:15 – pp – Marek Hrivik 2
Kevin Poulin 27 saves / 30 shots		Goalie stats	Cam Talbot 41 saves / 41 shots

April 22	Connecticut Whale	4 – 3	OT	Bridgeport Sound Tigers	XL Center	Recap
Marek Hrivik 3 – pp – 6:11		First period		19:44 – pp – Justin DiBenedetto 1
No scoring		Second period		No scoring
Ryan Bourque 2 – 5:32; Marek Hrivik 4 – 11:18		Third period		10:32 – David Ullstrom 1; 16:39 – Rhett Rakhshani 1
Casey Wellman 1 – pp – 16:36		First overtime period		No scoring
Cam Talbot 44 saves / 47 shots		Goalie stats		Kevin Poulin 50 saves / 54 shots

Connecticut won series 3–0

==== (4) Wilkes-Barre/Scranton Penguins vs. (5) Hershey Bears ====
April 20	Wilkes-Barre/Scranton Penguins	3 – 1	Hershey Bears	Mohegan Sun Arena at Casey Plaza	Recap
Colin McDonald 1 – pp – 14:40		First period	No scoring
Cal O'Reilly 1 – pp – 11:38		Second period	No scoring
Colin McDonald 2 – 11:56		Third period	18:08 – Mike Carman 1
Brad Thiessen 19 saves / 20 shots		Goalie stats	Dany Sabourin 26 saves / 29 shots

April 21	Wilkes-Barre/Scranton Penguins	7 – 2	Hershey Bears	Mohegan Sun Arena at Casey Plaza	Recap
Colin McDonald 3 – 1:19; Zach Sill 1 – 10:57; Cody Wild 1 – 12:19; Geoff Walker 1 – pp – 17:00		First period	No scoring
Matt Rust 1 – 9:24		Second period	2:29 – Patrick McNeill 1; 13:54 – Garrett Mitchell 1
Ben Street 1 – sh, ps – 12:42; Colin McDonald 4 – pp – 18:09		Third period	No scoring
Brad Thiessen 14 saves / 16 shots		Goalie stats	Dany Sabourin 20 saves / 27 shots

April 25	Hershey Bears	4 – 3	OT	Wilkes-Barre/Scranton Penguins	Giant Center	Recap
D. J. King 1 – 6:15; Cameron Schilling 1 – 17:03		First period		No scoring
Kyle Greentree 1 – 13:03		Second period		0:38 – pp – Cal O'Reilly 2
No scoring		Third period		6:22 – Eric Tangradi 1; 16:43 – pp – Alex Grant 1
Ryan Potulny 1 – pp – 2:57		First overtime period		No scoring
Dany Sabourin 26 saves / 29 shots		Goalie stats		Brad Thiessen 18 saves / 22 shots

April 27	Hershey Bears	4 – 1	Wilkes-Barre/Scranton Penguins	Giant Center	Recap
Cameron Schilling 2 – pp – 17:26		First period	No scoring
Boyd Kane 1 – pp – 7:52		Second period	17:50 – Jason Williams 1
Boyd Kane 2 – pp – 10:07; Chris Bourque – en – 19:26		Third period	No scoring
Dany Sabourin 22 saves / 23 shots		Goalie stats	Brad Thiessen 19 saves / 22 shots

April 28	Wilkes-Barre/Scranton Penguins	2 – 1	Hershey Bears	Mohegan Sun Arena at Casey Plaza	Recap
No scoring		First period	No scoring
Cal O'Reilly 3 – pp – 17:31; Zach Sill 2 – 17:38		Second period	No scoring
No scoring		Third period	0:23 – Ryan Potulny 2
Brad Thiessen 18 saves / 19 shots		Goalie stats	Dany Sabourin 26 saves / 28 shots

Wilkes-Barre/Scranton won series 3–2

=== Western Conference ===
==== (1) Oklahoma City Barons vs. (8) Houston Aeros ====
April 19	Houston Aeros	0 – 5	Oklahoma City Barons	Toyota Center	Recap
No scoring		First period	13:25 – Tyler Pitlick 1
No scoring		Second period	14:32 – pp – Teemu Hartikainen 1; 15:53 – Hunter Tremblay 1; 16:43 – Tanner House 1
No scoring		Third period	15:59 – Anton Lander 1
Matt Hackett 33 saves / 37 shots Mike Brodeur 10 saves / 11 shots		Goalie stats	Yann Danis 14 saves / 14 shots

April 20	Houston Aeros	1 – 4	Oklahoma City Barons	Toyota Center	Recap
No scoring		First period	19:13 – Ryan Keller 1
No scoring		Second period	4:02 – pp – Ryan Keller 2; 14:15 – Tyler Pitlick 2
Cody Almond 1 – 3:48		Third period	13:17 – sh – Hunter Tremblay 2
Matt Hackett 19 saves / 21 shots Mike Brodeur 14 saves / 16 shots		Goalie stats	Yann Danis 19 saves / 20 shots

April 22	Oklahoma City Barons	0 – 1	Houston Aeros	Cox Convention Center	Recap
No scoring		First period	No scoring
No scoring		Second period	11:26 – Brett Bulmer 1
No scoring		Third period	No scoring
Yann Danis 20 saves / 21 shots		Goalie stats	Mike Brodeur 31 saves / 31 shots

April 24	Oklahoma City Barons	5 – 2	Houston Aeros	Cox Convention Center	Recap
Mark Arcobello 1 – 6:13		First period	18:09 – Nate Prosser 1
Josh Green 1 – 0:45; Dylan Yeo 1 – 8:51		Second period	4:15 – Kris Foucault 1
Philippe Cornet 1 – 8:28; Josh Green 2 – en – 18:30		Third period	No scoring
Yann Danis 19 saves / 21 shots		Goalie stats	Mike Brodeur 22 saves / 26 shots

Oklahoma City won series 3–1

==== (2) Toronto Marlies vs. (7) Rochester Americans ====
April 19	Toronto Marlies	4 – 3	Rochester Americans	Ricoh Coliseum	Recap
No scoring		First period	15:05 – pp – Phil Varone 1
Jerry D'Amigo 1 – 15:09		Second period	No scoring
Matt Frattin 1 – 1:01; Michael Zigomanis 1 – pp – 4:40; Jerry D'Amigo 2 – 15:43		Third period	7:02 – pp – Marcus Foligno 1; 11:24 – T. J. Brennan 1
Ben Scrivens 20 saves / 23 shots		Goalie stats	David Leggio 34 saves / 38 shots

April 21	Toronto Marlies	4 – 3	Rochester Americans	Ricoh Coliseum	Recap
Jerry D'Amigo 3 – 1:44; Michael Zigomanis 2 – pp – 18:13		First period	No scoring
Nicolas Deschamps 1 – 18:22		Second period	10:48 – Marcus Foligno 2; 14:35 – Phil Varone 2
Jerry D'Amigo 4 – 18:10		Third period	3:21 – T. J. Brennan 2
Ben Scrivens 23 saves / 26 shots		Goalie stats	David Leggio 21 saves / 25 shots

April 23	Rochester Americans	0 – 3	Toronto Marlies	Blue Cross Arena at the War Memorial	Recap
No scoring		First period	3:59 – Philippe Dupuis 1
No scoring		Second period	1:36 – Jerry D'Amigo 5
No scoring		Third period	4:36 – Nazem Kadri 1
David Leggio 23 saves / 26 shots		Goalie stats	Ben Scrivens 29 saves / 29 shots

Toronto won series 3–0

==== (3) Chicago Wolves vs. (6) San Antonio Rampage ====
April 19	San Antonio Rampage	5 – 4	OT	Chicago Wolves	AT&T Center	Recap
James Wright 1 – 14:37		First period		12:49 – Bill Sweatt 1; 15:24 – Tim Miller 1; 18:55 – pp – Nicklas Jensen 1
Drew Shore 1 – 5:12; Jon Matsumoto 1 – pp – 10:24		Second period		8:01 – pp – Nicklas Jensen 2
Jon Matsumoto 2 – 5:23		Third period		No scoring
Colby Robak 1 – pp – 14:16		First overtime period		No scoring
Jacob Markstrom 33 saves / 37 shots		Goalie stats		Eddie Lack 32 saves / 37 shots

April 21	San Antonio Rampage	4 – 3	Chicago Wolves	AT&T Center	Recap
Bill Thomas 1 – pp – 4:18; James Wright 2 – pp – 13:51		First period	14:14 – Kevin Doell 1
Jon Matsumoto 3 – pp – 9:10; Bracken Kearns 1 – 13:43		Second period	No scoring
No scoring		Third period	8:07 – pp – Darren Haydar 1; 8:48 – pp – Kevin Doell 2
Jacob Markstrom 36 saves / 39 shots		Goalie stats	Matt Climie 20 saves / 24 shots Eddie Lack 7 saves / 7 shots

April 24	Chicago Wolves	3 – 2	San Antonio Rampage	Allstate Arena	Recap
Jordan Schroeder 1 – 12:24; Darren Haydar 2 – 19:05		First period	No scoring
No scoring		Second period	16:41 – pp – Alex Petrovic 1
Darren Haydar 3 – en – 19:22		Third period	19:58 – Bracken Kearns 2
Eddie Lack 18 saves / 20 shots		Goalie stats	Dov Grumet-Morris 21 saves / 23 shots

April 25	Chicago Wolves	3 – 1	San Antonio Rampage	Allstate Arena	Recap
No scoring		First period	0:43 – Michael Caruso 1
Steven Reinprecht 1 – pp – 17:53		Second period	No scoring
Steven Reinprecht 2 – 12:00; Tim Miller 2 – en – 19:31		Third period	No scoring
Eddie Lack 30 saves / 31 shots		Goalie stats	Dov Grumet-Morris 12 saves / 14 shots

April 27	Chicago Wolves	2 – 3	2OT	San Antonio Rampage	Allstate Arena	Recap
No scoring		First period		No scoring
No scoring		Second period		7:23 – pp – Evan Barlow 1
Brad Hunt 1 – 10:34; Darren Haydar 4 – 18:52		Third period		8:00 – Mark Cullen 1
No scoring		Second overtime period		5:28 – Roman Derlyuk 1
Eddie Lack 34 saves / 37 shots		Goalie stats		Jacob Markstrom 37 saves / 39 shots

San Antonio won series 3–2

==== (4) Abbotsford Heat vs. (5) Milwaukee Admirals ====
April 20	Milwaukee Admirals	2 – 6	Abbotsford Heat	Bradley Center	Recap
Mark Van Guilder 1 – 5:00; Jani Lajunen 1 – 17:59		First period	3:33 – Dustin Sylvester 1
No scoring		Second period	2:50 – pp – Greg Nemisz 1; 13:01 – Greg Nemisz 2; 14:38 – pp – Krys Kolanos 1
No scoring		Third period	12:44 – Jon Rheault 1; 19:47 – en – Krys Kolanos 2
Jeremy Smith 20 saves / 25 shots		Goalie stats	Danny Taylor 20 saves / 22 shots

April 22	Milwaukee Admirals	2 – 4	Abbotsford Heat	Bradley Center	Recap
No scoring		First period	No scoring
Brodie Dupont 1 – 0:32; Chris Mueller 1 – pp – 6:34		Second period	4:08 – pp – Krys Kolanos 3; 14:59 – Ben Walter 1
No scoring		Third period	4:17 – Krys Kolanos 4; 18:54 – en – Jon Rheault 2
Jeremy Smith 23 saves / 26 shots		Goalie stats	Danny Taylor 28 saves / 30 shots

April 25	Abbotsford Heat	4 – 2	Milwaukee Admirals	Abbotsford Entertainment & Sports Centre	Recap
Hugh Jessiman 1 – 2:10		First period	No scoring
Clay Wilson 1 – pp – 6:18		Second period	16:24 – pp – Kyle Wilson 1; 18:35 – pp – Victor Bartley 1
Dustin Sylvester 2 – pp – 8:47; Clay Wilson 2 – en – 19:30		Third period	No scoring
Danny Taylor 26 saves / 28 shots		Goalie stats	Jeremy Smith 28 saves / 31 shots

Abbotsford won series 3–0

== Conference semifinals ==
=== Eastern Conference ===
==== (1) Norfolk Admirals vs. (6) Connecticut Whale ====
May 2	Norfolk Admirals	2 – 3	OT	Connecticut Whale	Norfolk Scope	Recap
Ondrej Palat 1 – 5:43; Pierre-Cedric Labrie 2 – 16:56		First period		8:18 – Jonathan Audy-Marchessault 2; 8:30 – Marek Hrivik 5
No scoring		Second period		No scoring
No scoring		Third period		No scoring
No scoring		First overtime period		2:53 – Andreas Thuresson 1
Dustin Tokarski 26 saves / 29 shots		Goalie stats		Cam Talbot 31 saves / 33 shots

May 4	Norfolk Admirals	4 – 1	Connecticut Whale	Norfolk Scope	Recap
Alexander Killorn 2 – 3:00; Mike Kostka 1 – 17:44		First period	No scoring
Tyler Johnson 1 – pp – 15:45		Second period	9:02 – pp – Andre Deveaux 1
Cory Conacher 1 – pp – 4:41		Third period	No scoring
Dustin Tokarski 27 saves / 28 shots		Goalie stats	Cam Talbot 36 saves / 40 shots

May 6	Connecticut Whale	3 – 4	Norfolk Admirals	XL Center	Recap
Casey Wellman 2 – pp – 5:20; Andre Deveaux 2 – 17:12		First period	8:01 – sh – Ondrej Palat 2
No scoring		Second period	11:31 – pp – Alexander Killorn 3; 12:16 – Trevor Smith 3; 17:40 – Mike Angelidis 1
Casey Wellman 3 – pp – 1:06		Third period	No scoring
Cam Talbot 18 saves / 22 shots		Goalie stats	Dustin Tokarski 27 saves / 30 shots

May 7	Connecticut Whale	4 – 1	Norfolk Admirals	XL Center	Recap
Jonathan Audy-Marchessault 3 – 19:05		First period	No scoring
Scott Tanski 1 – 3:56		Second period	7:42 – Richard Panik 1
Casey Wellman 4 – 16:48; Kris Newbury 1 – en – 17:51		Third period	No scoring
Cam Talbot 19 saves / 20 shots		Goalie stats	Dustin Tokarski 20 saves / 23 shots

May 9*	Connecticut Whale	0 – 4	Norfolk Admirals	XL Center	Recap
No scoring		First period	15:15 – Alexandre Picard 5
No scoring		Second period	2:43 – Alexandre Picard 6
No scoring		Third period	14:06 – Ondrej Palat 3; 19:54 – Pierre-Cedric Labrie 3
Cam Talbot 32 saves / 36 shots		Goalie stats	Jaroslav Janus 22 saves / 22 shots

May 11	Norfolk Admirals	2 – 1	OT	Connecticut Whale	Norfolk Scope	Recap
No scoring		First period		14:49 – Jonathan Audy-Marchessault 4
No scoring		Second period		No scoring
Tyler Johnson 2 – 10:52		Third period		No scoring
Richard Panik 2 – 13:01		First overtime period		No scoring
Jaroslav Janus 30 saves / 31 shots		Goalie stats		Cam Talbot 44 saves / 46 shots

Norfolk won series 4–2

* Game five was played at the Webster Bank Arena in Bridgeport.

==== (2) St. John's IceCaps vs. (4) Wilkes-Barre/Scranton Penguins ====
May 1	St. John's IceCaps	3 – 1	Wilkes-Barre/Scranton Penguins	Mile One Centre	Recap
No scoring		First period	4:42 – pp – Cal O'Reilly 4
Brock Trotter 2 – 7:25		Second period	No scoring
Brock Trotter 3 – 2:27; Garth Murray 1 – 18:06		Third period	No scoring
Eddie Pasquale 19 saves / 20 shots		Goalie stats	Brad Thiessen 34 saves / 37 shots

May 2	St. John's IceCaps	1 – 3	Wilkes-Barre/Scranton Penguins	Mile One Centre	Recap
Ben Maxwell 2 – pp – 15:42		First period	9:48 – Eric Tangradi 2
No scoring		Second period	No scoring
No scoring		Third period	2:38 – sh – Joey Mormina 1; 4:58 – pp – Jason Williams 2
Edward Pasquale 35 saves / 38 shots		Goalie stats	Brad Thiessen 22 saves / 23 shots

May 5	Wilkes-Barre/Scranton Penguins	1 – 2	OT	St. John's IceCaps	Mohegan Sun Arena at Casey Plaza	Recap
No scoring		First period		12:37 – Brock Trotter 4
No scoring		Second period		No scoring
Eric Tangradi 3 – 18:58		Third period		No scoring
No scoring		First overtime period		10:02 – Brock Trotter 5
Brad Thiessen 16 saves / 18 shots		Goalie stats		Edward Pasquale 28 saves / 29 shots

May 6	Wilkes-Barre/Scranton Penguins	2 – 3	OT	St. John's IceCaps	Mohegan Sun Arena at Casey Plaza	Recap
Colin McDonald 5 – 4:30; Eric Tangradi 4 – 6:49		First period		No scoring
No scoring		Second period		4:24 – Derek Meech 4; 16:35 – Maxime Macenauer 1
No scoring		Third period		No scoring
No scoring		First overtime period		0:27 – Ben Maxwell 3
Brad Thiessen 26 saves / 29 shots		Goalie stats		Edward Pasquale 14 saves / 16 shots

May 8	Wilkes-Barre/Scranton Penguins	3 – 2	2OT	St. John's IceCaps	Mohegan Sun Arena at Casey Plaza	Recap
No scoring		First period		5:21 – Jason King 2
Paul Thompson 1 – 8:12		Second period		No scoring
Alex Grant 2 – 2:18		Third period		4:00 – pp – Paul Postma 1
Simon Despres 1 – 12:08		Second overtime period		No scoring
Brad Thiessen 26 saves / 28 shots Scott Munroe 1 save / 1 shot		Goalie stats		Edward Pasquale 42 saves / 45 shots

May 11	St. John's IceCaps	2 – 4	Wilkes-Barre/Scranton Penguins	Mile One Centre	Recap
No scoring		First period	9:48 – pp – Jason Williams 3
Patrice Cormier 3 – pp – 4:31; Raymond Sawada 2 – pp – 11:09		Second period	19:51 – pp – Cal O'Reilly 5
No scoring		Third period	5:41 – Zach Sill 3; 16:30 – Paul Thompson 2
Edward Pasquale 27 saves / 31 shots		Goalie stats	Brad Thiessen 29 saves / 31 shots

May 12	St. John's IceCaps	3 – 2	Wilkes-Barre/Scranton Penguins	Mile One Centre	Recap
Raymond Sawada 3 – 11:52		First period	No scoring
Aaron Gagnon 4 – pp – 11:35		Second period	6:43 – Ryan Craig 1
Aaron Gagnon 5 – 0:53		Third period	9:36 – pp – Colin McDonald 6
Edward Pasquale 26 saves / 28 shots		Goalie stats	Brad Thiessen 24 saves / 27 shots

St. John's won series 4–3

=== Western Conference ===
==== (1) Oklahoma City Barons vs. (6) San Antonio Rampage ====
May 3	Oklahoma City Barons	4 – 6	San Antonio Rampage	Cox Convention Center	Recap
Hunter Tremblay 3 – 10:13; Mark Arcobello 2 – pp – 12:21		First period	16:58 – pp – Alex Petrovic 2
Josh Green 3 – 1:24; Teemu Hartikainen 2 – 3:48		Second period	2:46 – Mark Cullen 2; 8:13 – Bill Thomas 2; 16:55 – pp – Tyson Strachan 1
No scoring		Third period	15:21 – Michael Caruso 1; 18:09 – Jon Matsumoto 4
Yann Danis 23 saves / 29 shots		Goalie stats	Jacob Markstrom 26 saves / 30 shots

May 5	Oklahoma City Barons	5 – 4	OT	San Antonio Rampage	Cox Convention Center	Recap
Chris VandeVelde 1 – 8:31		First period		19:18 – pp – Bill Thomas 3
Mark Arcobello 3 – 11:47; Teemu Hartikainen 3 – 13:37		Second period		2:59 – pp – Mark Cullen 3
Magnus Paajarvi 1 – pp – 19:50		Third period		10:16 – pp – Evan Barlow 2; 15:31 – Bill Thomas 4
Josh Green 4 – 11:40		First overtime period		No scoring
Yann Danis 22 saves / 26 shots		Goalie stats		Jacob Markstrom 32 saves / 37 shots

May 7	San Antonio Rampage	1 – 2	OT	Oklahoma City Barons	AT&T Center	Recap
No scoring		First period		1:18 – Anton Lander 2
No scoring		Second period		No scoring
James Wright 3 – pp – 11:06		Third period		No scoring
No scoring		First overtime period		15:50 – Chris VandeVelde 2
Jacob Markstrom 34 saves / 36 shots		Goalie stats		Yann Danis 25 saves / 26 shots

May 10	San Antonio Rampage	1 – 2	OT	Oklahoma City Barons	AT&T Center	Recap
No scoring		First period		No scoring
No scoring		Second period		No scoring
Bill Thomas 5 – 15:09		Third period		10:56 – Hunter Tremblay 4
No scoring		First overtime period		1:05 – Chris VandeVelde 3
Jacob Markstrom 28 saves / 30 shots		Goalie stats		Yann Danis 30 saves / 31 shots

May 11	San Antonio Rampage	3 – 4	Oklahoma City Barons	AT&T Center	Recap
No scoring		First period	19:56 – pp – Mark Arcobello 4
Michal Repik 1 – pp – 18:06		Second period	9:26 – pp – Bryan Rodney 1
Scott Timmins 1 – 4:55; Mark Cullen 4 – 5:17		Third period	2:12 – Ryan Keller 3; 17:54 – pp – Ryan Keller 4
Jacob Markstrom 27 saves / 31 shots		Goalie stats	Yann Danis 22 saves / 25 shots

Oklahoma City won series 4–1

==== (2) Toronto Marlies vs. (4) Abbotsford Heat ====
May 1	Toronto Marlies	1 – 3	Abbotsford Heat	Ricoh Coliseum	Recap
No scoring		First period	15:24 – Max Reinhart 1
No scoring		Second period	8:17 – Chris Breen 1
Matt Frattin 2 – 1:27		Third period	18:39 – en – Guillaume Desbiens 1
Ben Scrivens 26 saves / 28 shots		Goalie stats	Danny Taylor 31 saves / 32 shots

May 3	Toronto Marlies	5 – 1	Abbotsford Heat	Ricoh Coliseum	Recap
Ryan Hamilton 1 – pp – 15:15; Matt Frattin 3 – 19:36		First period	10:03 – Jon Rheault 3
Jerry D'Amigo 6 – 2:03; Korbinian Holzer 1 – 3:56		Second period	No scoring
Nazem Kadri 2 – en – 11:30		Third period	No scoring
Ben Scrivens 37 saves / 38 shots		Goalie stats	Danny Taylor 24 saves / 28 shots

May 5	Abbotsford Heat	1 – 4	Toronto Marlies	Abbotsford Entertainment & Sports Centre	Recap
No scoring		First period	0:58 – Nazem Kadri 3; 11:43 – Matt Frattin 4
Dustin Sylvester 3 – 2:21		Second period	12:30 – Philippe Dupuis 2
No scoring		Third period	14:46 – Marcel Mueller 1
Leland Irving 22 saves / 26 shots		Goalie stats	Ben Scrivens 20 saves / 21 shots

May 8	Abbotsford Heat	1 – 3	Toronto Marlies	Abbotsford Entertainment & Sports Centre	Recap
No scoring		First period	No scoring
Hugh Jessiman 2 – 9:29		Second period	No scoring
No scoring		Third period	2:31 – Greg Scott 1; 7:11 – sh – Greg Scott 2; 19:31 – en – Greg Scott 3
Danny Taylor 14 saves / 16 shots		Goalie stats	Ben Scrivens 35 saves / 36 shots

May 9	Abbotsford Heat	2 – 3	OT	Toronto Marlies	Abbotsford Entertainment & Sports Centre	Recap
Paul Byron 1 – sh – 3:03; Krys Kolanos 5 – 13:30		First period		14:32 – Jake Gardiner 1
No scoring		Second period		18:00 – Matt Frattin 5
No scoring		Third period		No scoring
No scoring		First overtime period		9:02 – pp – Michael Zigomanis 3
Danny Taylor 33 saves / 36 shots		Goalie stats		Ben Scrivens 29 saves / 31 shots

Toronto won series 4–1

== Conference finals ==
=== Eastern Conference ===
==== (1) Norfolk Admirals vs. (2) St. John's IceCaps ====
May 17	Norfolk Admirals	6 – 1	St. John's IceCaps	Norfolk Scope	Recap
Mike Kostka 2 – pp – 18:55		First period	No scoring
Michel Ouellet 1 – pp – 3:08; Mike Kostka 3 – 11:04; Jean-Philippe Cote 1 – 13:42		Second period	No scoring
Ondrej Palat 4 – 1:28; Keith Aulie 1 – 7:21		Third period	2:11 – pp – Zach Redmond 1
Dustin Tokarski 29 saves / 30 shots		Goalie stats	Edward Pasquale 17 saves / 21 shots David Aebischer 10 saves / 12 shots

May 19	Norfolk Admirals	3 – 1	St. John's IceCaps	Norfolk Scope	Recap
Richard Panik 3 – 0:51		First period	No scoring
Alexandre Picard 7 – 15:38		Second period	1:51 – John Albert 3
Alexandre Picard 8 – en – 19:07		Third period	No scoring
Dustin Tokarski 30 saves / 31 shots		Goalie stats	Edward Pasquale 35 saves / 37 shots

May 21	St. John's IceCaps	0 – 1	OT	Norfolk Admirals	Mile One Centre	Recap
No scoring		First period		No scoring
No scoring		Second period		No scoring
No scoring		Third period		No scoring
No scoring		First overtime period		1:37 – Pierre-Cedric Labrie 4
Edward Pasquale 26 saves / 27 shots		Goalie stats		Dustin Tokarski 25 saves / 25 shots

May 22	St. John's IceCaps	0 – 4	Norfolk Admirals	Mile One Centre	Recap
No scoring		First period	15:15 – Evan Oberg 2; 17:47 – pp – Tyler Johnson 3
No scoring		Second period	1:41 – Trevor Smith 4
No scoring		Third period	9:28 – pp – Brandon Segal 3
Edward Pasquale 38 saves / 42 shots		Goalie stats	Dustin Tokarski 29 saves / 29 shots

Norfolk won series 4–0

=== Western Conference ===
==== (1) Oklahoma City Barons vs. (2) Toronto Marlies ====
May 17	Oklahoma City Barons	0 – 5	Toronto Marlies	Cox Convention Center	Recap
No scoring		First period	5:47 – Marcel Mueller 2; 14:12 – pp – Nicolas Deschamps 2
No scoring		Second period	12:16 – Matt Frattin 6
No scoring		Third period	5:03 – Joe Colborne 1; 13:08 – Jake Gardiner 2
Yann Danis 27 saves / 32 shots		Goalie stats	Ben Scrivens 31 saves / 31 shots

May 18	Oklahoma City Barons	5 – 1	Toronto Marlies	Cox Convention Center	Recap
Mark Arcobello 5 – pp – 4:23; Teemu Hartikainen 4 – 19:51		First period	No scoring
Philippe Cornet 2 – 16:49		Second period	No scoring
Chris VandeVelde 4 – 16:25; Ryan Keller 5 – en – 17:28		Third period	9:21 – Will Acton 1
Yann Danis 27 saves / 28 shots		Goalie stats	Ben Scrivens 22 saves / 26 shots

May 21	Toronto Marlies	5 – 3	Oklahoma City Barons	Ricoh Coliseum	Recap
Philippe Dupuis 3 – pp – 12:35		First period	No scoring
Ryan Hamilton 2 – pp – 14:57; Matt Frattin 7 – 19:17		Second period	17:10 – pp – Bryan Rodney 2; 18:29 – Chris VandeVelde 5
Matt Frattin 8 – 17:58; Jerry D'Amigo 7 – sh, en – 18:53		Third period	11:56 – Magnus Paajarvi 2
Ben Scrivens 25 saves / 28 shots		Goalie stats	Yann Danis 22 saves / 26 shots

May 23	Toronto Marlies	3 – 0	Oklahoma City Barons	Ricoh Coliseum	Recap
Philippe Dupuis 4 – 13:42		First period	No scoring
Nicolas Deschamps 3 – 11:36		Second period	No scoring
Jerry D'Amigo 8 – en – 18:22		Third period	No scoring
Ben Scrivens 30 saves / 30 shots		Goalie stats	Yann Danis 10 saves / 12 shots David LeNeveu 3 saves / 3 shots

May 25	Toronto Marlies	3 – 1	Oklahoma City Barons	Ricoh Coliseum	Recap
Matt Frattin 9 – pp – 1:13		First period	No scoring
No scoring		Second period	19:45 – Chris VandeVelde 6
Simon Gysbers 1 – 8:38; Matt Frattin 10 – en – 19:18		Third period	No scoring
Ben Scrivens 26 saves / 27 shots		Goalie stats	Yann Danis 22 saves / 24 shots

Toronto won series 4–1

== Calder Cup Finals ==
=== Norfolk Admirals vs. Toronto Marlies ===
June 1	Norfolk Admirals	3 – 1	Toronto Marlies	Norfolk Scope	Recap
Cory Conacher 2 – 12:21		First period	No scoring
Tyler Johnson 4 – pp – 10:03		Second period	No scoring
Brandon Segal 4 – en, sh – 19:41		Third period	3:57 – Carter Ashton 1
Dustin Tokarski 23 saves / 24 shots		Goalie stats	Ben Scrivens 39 saves / 41 shots

June 2	Norfolk Admirals	4 – 2	Toronto Marlies	Norfolk Scope	Recap
Richard Panik 4 – 14:38		First period	18:20 – pp – Joe Colborne 2
Alexandre Picard 9 – 15:17		Second period	No scoring
Brandon Segal 5 – 8:26; Trevor Smith 5 – 15:52		Third period	19:17 – Juraj Mikus 1
Dustin Tokarski 30 saves / 32 shots		Goalie stats	Ben Scrivens 28 saves / 32 shots

June 7	Toronto Marlies	0 – 1	OT	Norfolk Admirals	Ricoh Coliseum	Recap
No scoring		First period		No scoring
No scoring		Second period		No scoring
No scoring		Third period		No scoring
No scoring		First overtime period		9:09 – Mike Kostka 4
Ben Scrivens 30 saves / 31 shots		Goalie stats		Dustin Tokarski 22 saves / 22 shots

June 9	Toronto Marlies	1 – 6	Norfolk Admirals	Ricoh Coliseum	Recap
Michael Zigomanis 4 – pp – 19:43		First period	6:17 – Richard Panik 5
No scoring		Second period	4:26 – Mike Kostka 5; 16:45 – Tyler Johnson 5
No scoring		Third period	0:44 – pp – Mike Kostka 6; 12:35 – en – Tyler Johnson 6; 13:33 – Pierre-Cedric Labrie 5
Ben Scrivens 26 saves / 31 shots		Goalie stats	Dustin Tokarski 18 saves / 19 shots

Norfolk wins series 4–0

== Playoff statistical leaders ==
=== Leading skaters ===
These are the top ten skaters based on points. If there is a tie in points, goals take precedence over assists.

GP = Games played; G = Goals; A = Assists; Pts = Points; +/– = Plus–minus; PIM = Penalty minutes

Player	Team	GP	G	A	Pts	PIM
Alexandre Picard	Norfolk Admirals	18	9	7	16	48
Trevor Smith	Norfolk Admirals	18	5	11	16	20
Cory Conacher	Norfolk Admirals	18	2	13	15	28
Tyler Johnson	Norfolk Admirals	14	6	8	14	6
Philippe Dupuis	Toronto Marlies	17	4	10	14	20
Matt Frattin	Toronto Marlies	13	10	3	13	6
Jerry D'Amigo	Toronto Marlies	17	8	5	13	12
Colin McDonald	Wilkes-Barre/Scranton Penguins	12	6	7	13	2
Mark Arcobello	Oklahoma City Barons	14	5	8	13	6
Jon Matsumoto	San Antonio Rampage	10	4	9	13	8

=== Leading goaltenders ===
This is a combined table of the top five goaltenders based on goals against average and the top five goaltenders based on save percentage with at least 360 minutes played. The table is initially sorted by goals against average, with the criterion for inclusion in bold.

GP = Games played; W = Wins; L = Losses; SA = Shots against; GA = Goals against; GAA = Goals against average; SV% = Save percentage; SO = Shutouts; TOI = Time on ice (in minutes)

Player	Team	GP	W	L	SA	GA	GAA	SV%	SO	TOI
Dustin Tokarski	Norfolk Admirals	14	12	2	373	21	**1.46**	**.944**	3	865
Ben Scrivens	Toronto Marlies	17	11	6	509	33	**1.92**	**.935**	3	1029
Cam Talbot	Connecticut Whale	9	5	4	327	20	**2.10**	**.939**	2	571
Brad Thiessen	Wilkes-Barre/Scranton Penguins	12	6	6	292	27	**2.14**	.908	0	756
Danny Taylor	Abbotsford Heat	7	4	3	192	16	**2.26**	**.917**	0	425
Edward Pasquale	St. John's IceCaps	15	7	8	482	37	2.42	**.923**	0	917

== Broadcasting ==
Leafs TV, as the main broadcaster of the Toronto Marlies, aired the first three games of the Calder Cup Final in Canada. While the channel is normally restricted to the home market of the Toronto Maple Leafs (which includes most of Ontario), Leafs TV allowed television providers outside of the Leafs' market to carry the channel during the Calder Cup on a "preview" basis to allow nationwide coverage of the games. Sportsnet One would replace Leafs TV to air Game 4. In the United States, CBS Sports Network picked up the broadcast rights in the United States beginning with game 3, while Norfolk-area CW affiliate WGNT aired the games in simulcast with their Canadian broadcaster. The series was also carried by ESPN America, and on the NHL Home Ice channel on SiriusXM.

== See also ==
- 2011–12 AHL season
- List of AHL seasons

Preceded by 2011 Calder Cup playoffs	Calder Cup playoffs 2012	Succeeded by 2013 Calder Cup playoffs
