= Alexandre Picard =

Alexandre Picard may refer to:

- Alexandre R. Picard (born 1985), hockey defencemen originally drafted by the Philadelphia Flyers of the NHL
- Alexandre Picard (ice hockey) (born 1985), hockey left winger originally drafted by the Columbus Blue Jackets of the NHL
