= Trevor Smith (ice hockey) =

Canadian ice hockey player (born 1985)

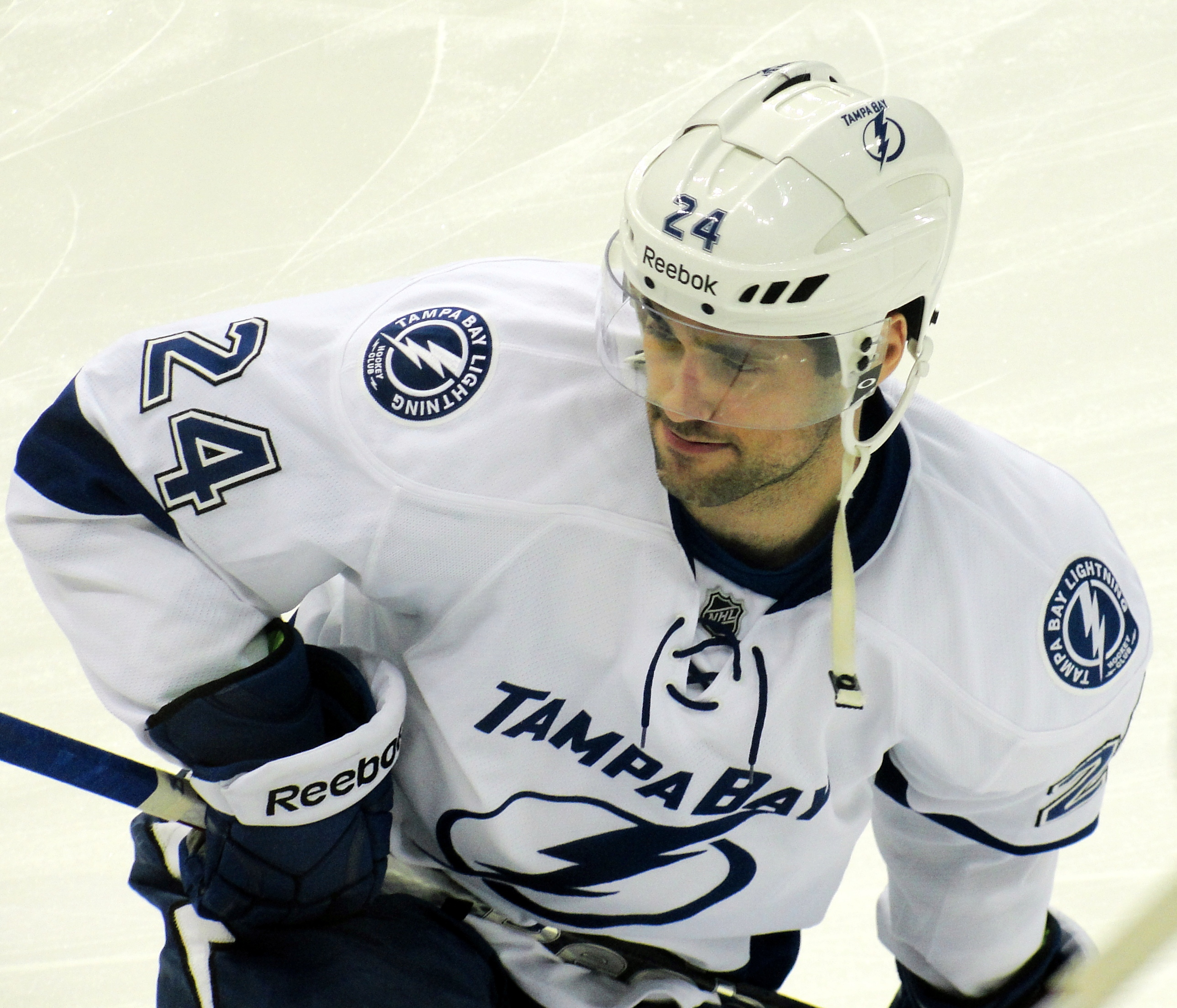
- Smith with the Lightning in 2012.
- Born: February 8, 1985 (age 41) Ottawa, Ontario, Canada
- Height: 6 ft 1 in (185 cm)
- Weight: 195 lb (88 kg; 13 st 13 lb)
- Position: Centre
- Shot: Left
- Played for: New York Islanders; Tampa Bay Lightning; Pittsburgh Penguins; Toronto Maple Leafs; SC Bern; Nashville Predators
- NHL draft: Undrafted
- Playing career: 2007–2019

Trevor Smith (born February 8, 1985) is a Canadian former professional ice hockey centre. He most recently played with the San Antonio Rampage in the American Hockey League (AHL).

== Early life ==
Smith was born in Ottawa, Ontario. to father Harvey Smith. His parents are originally from Montreal, Quebec but Smith grew up in Vancouver, British Columbia.

== Playing career ==
=== Amateur ===
Before college, he played in 2001–02 for the Queens Park Pirates Pacific Junior Hockey League (PIJHL), in 2003–04 for the Quesnel Millionaires of the British Columbia Hockey League (BCHL), and in 2004–05 for the Omaha Lancers of the United States Hockey League (USHL), for whom he played in the USHL All Star Game.

He played two seasons in the NCAA with the University of New Hampshire, in 2005–07. There, he was an All Hockey East First team selection, an NCAA East Second Team All-American, and was named to the New England All-Star team. He had 63 points in 78 games over two seasons.

=== Professional ===
He then signed as a free agent with the New York Islanders on April 2, 2007. He played 8 games with the Islanders' American Hockey League affiliate, the Bridgeport Sound Tigers at the end of the 2006–07 campaign, notching three points and two penalty minutes.

During the 2007–08 season, Trevor split time between the Utah Grizzlies and the Bridgeport Sound Tigers, playing 53 games in Bridgeport and 22 in Utah. He was picked to represent Utah at the ECHL All-Star game, but could not play as he was recalled to Bridgeport. He was named the Rbk Edge/AHL Rookie of the Month for February 2008 after scoring 15 points in 13 games.

Smith had a breakout year during the 2008–09 season for the Sound Tigers playing on the first line between Kurtis McLean and Mike Iggulden, scoring 30 goals and notching 32 assists in 76 games. Trevor made his NHL debut with the Islanders later that season, wearing number 77 and scoring one goal in seven games.

On July 2, 2010, Smith signed as a free agent to a one-year contract with the Anaheim Ducks.

On January 4, 2011, he was traded to the Columbus Blue Jackets in exchange for Nate Guenin. On July 5, 2011, Smith was signed to a one-year, two-way contract with the Tampa Bay Lightning.

In 2011–12, he played in the AHL All-Star Game, had an AHL Best Plus/Minus (+34), played for the AHL Calder Cup Champion, and had the AHL Most Points Playoffs (16).

On July 1, 2012, Smith was signed to a one-year, two-way contract with the Pittsburgh Penguins. Due to the NHL lockout, Smith was directly assigned to the Penguins AHL affiliate, the Wilkes-Barre/Scranton Penguins for the majority of the 2012–13 season. He was briefly recalled by the Penguins and played a solitary game against the New York Islanders on March 22, 2013.

During the summer of 2013 he was recruited to play for Team Canada in the 2013 Maccabiah Games in Israel, but was recovering from an upper-body injury sustained during the AHL playoffs and turned down the request; his father was assistant coach to the team, and it won a gold medal. He said: "I would have been upset if Canada had lost because I had not gone".

On July 5, 2013, Smith was signed as a free agent to a one-year, one-way contract with the Toronto Maple Leafs for a reported $550,000. On September 30, he was assigned to the Toronto Marlies of the American Hockey League.

On October 4, 2013, Smith was named as team captain of the Toronto Marlies – the Maple Leafs' AHL affiliate, becoming the 5th Captain in team history. On October 8 he debuted for the Leafs, becoming the 900th player in franchise history.

On July 2, 2015, Smith as a free agent signed his first contract abroad, agreeing to a two-year contract with Swiss club, SC Bern of the National League A (NLA). He won the 2016 Swiss championship with Bern, but missed large parts of the 2015-16 season after undergoing elbow surgery. He returned to game action in February 2016. During his Bern stint, Smith made 18 NLA appearances producing three goals and two assists and played in four contests of the Champions Hockey League, scoring one goal and two assists. He left after a single season at SCB.

On July 2, 2016, he inked a two-year, two-way contract with the Nashville Predators of the National Hockey League (NHL). Smith made his debut with the Predators in a solitary game during the 2016–17 season, spending the duration of his contract with Nashville's AHL affiliate, the Milwaukee Admirals.

As a free agent from the Predators, Smith agreed to a one-year AHL contract to add a veteran presence to the San Antonio Rampage on July 30, 2018.

== Career statistics ==
			Regular season					Playoffs
Season	Team	League	GP	G	A	Pts	PIM	GP	G	A	Pts	PIM
2002–03	South Surrey Eagles	BCHL	53	13	9	22	51	—	—	—	—	—
2003–04	Quesnel Millionaires	BCHL	44	28	19	47	50	—	—	—	—	—
2004–05	Omaha Lancers	USHL	60	29	39	68	78	5	3	1	4	2
2005–06	University of New Hampshire	HE	39	10	10	20	34	—	—	—	—	—
2006–07	University of New Hampshire	HE	39	21	22	43	39	—	—	—	—	—
2006–07	Bridgeport Sound Tigers	AHL	8	1	2	3	2	—	—	—	—	—
2007–08	Bridgeport Sound Tigers	AHL	53	20	17	37	16	—	—	—	—	—
2007–08	Utah Grizzlies	ECHL	22	11	14	25	28	—	—	—	—	—
2008–09	Bridgeport Sound Tigers	AHL	76	30	32	62	40	5	1	3	4	0
2008–09	New York Islanders	NHL	7	1	0	1	0	—	—	—	—	—
2009–10	Bridgeport Sound Tigers	AHL	77	21	26	47	73	5	1	2	3	2
2010–11	Syracuse Crunch	AHL	35	12	15	27	16	—	—	—	—	—
2010–11	Springfield Falcons	AHL	33	8	8	16	10	—	—	—	—	—
2011–12	Tampa Bay Lightning	NHL	16	2	3	5	4	—	—	—	—	—
2011–12	Norfolk Admirals	AHL	64	26	43	69	70	18	5	11	16	20
2012–13	Wilkes-Barre/Scranton Penguins	AHL	75	23	31	54	64	15	5	8	13	9
2012–13	Pittsburgh Penguins	NHL	1	0	0	0	0	—	—	—	—	—
2013–14	Toronto Marlies	AHL	24	10	16	26	10	14	3	8	11	2
2013–14	Toronto Maple Leafs	NHL	28	4	5	9	4	—	—	—	—	—
2014–15	Toronto Marlies	AHL	8	2	3	5	12	—	—	—	—	—
2014–15	Toronto Maple Leafs	NHL	54	2	3	5	12	—	—	—	—	—
2015–16	SC Bern	NLA	17	3	2	5	14	1	0	0	0	0
2016–17	Milwaukee Admirals	AHL	74	14	35	49	47	3	0	1	1	0
2016–17	Nashville Predators	NHL	1	0	0	0	0	—	—	—	—	—
2017–18	Milwaukee Admirals	AHL	66	17	26	43	36	—	—	—	—	—
2018–19	San Antonio Rampage	AHL	51	9	13	22	28	—	—	—	—	—
NHL totals			107	9	11	20	20	—	—	—	—	—

== Awards and honours ==
Award	Year
College
All-Hockey East First Team	2007
AHCA East Second-Team All-American	2007
AHL
Calder Cup (Norfolk Admirals)	2012

== See also ==
- List of select Jewish ice hockey players
