= Zach Sill =

Canadian ice hockey player

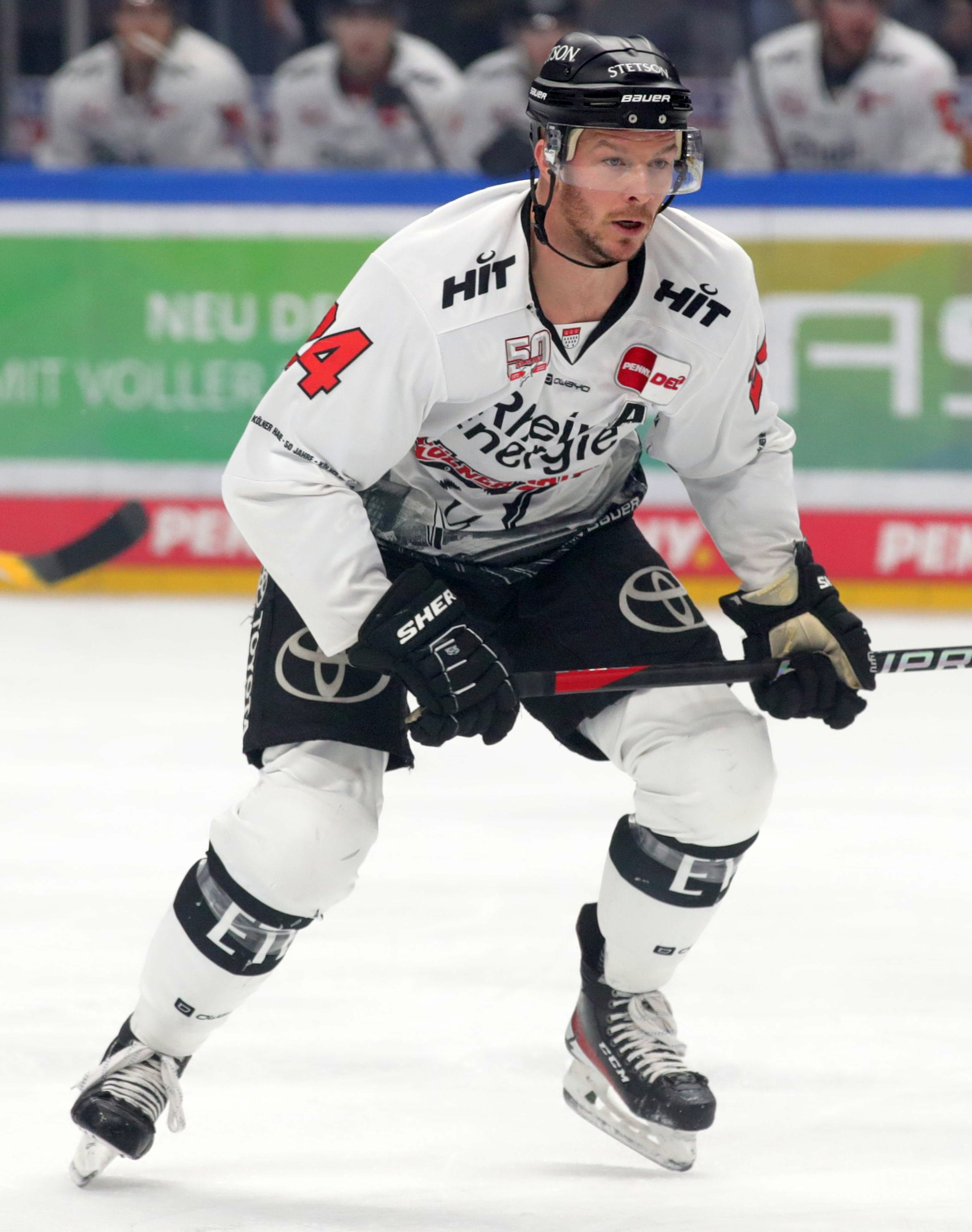
- Sill with the Kölner Haie in 2023
- Born: May 24, 1988 (age 38) Truro, Nova Scotia, Canada
- Height: 6 ft 0 in (183 cm)
- Weight: 202 lb (92 kg; 14 st 6 lb)
- Position: Centre
- Shoots: Left
- ICEHL team Former teams: HC Pustertal Wölfe; Pittsburgh Penguins; Toronto Maple Leafs; Washington Capitals; HC Sparta Praha; Kölner Haie
- NHL draft: Undrafted
- Playing career: 2009–present

Zach Sill (born May 24, 1988) is a Canadian professional ice hockey centreman who is currently playing for The East Hants Penguins of the Nova Scotia Senior Hockey League (NSSHL). In North America, he most recently played for the Hershey Bears in the American Hockey League (AHL) while under contract to the Washington Capitals of the National Hockey League (NHL).

== Playing career ==
=== Collegiate/junior ===
Sill was drafted by the Quebec Major Junior Hockey League (QMJHL)'s Moncton Wildcats in the 2005 junior draft, but opted to keep his NCAA eligibility and not immediately play major junior hockey for Moncton. He had an impressive 2005–06 season with the Truro Bearcats of the MJAHL. He began the 2006–07 season with the University of Maine, but parted ways early in 2007 after playing in just six games with the Black Bears. Sill then went back to the Bearcats for six games before going on to win playoff MVP and lead the Bearcats to the Fred Page Cup championship.

The following season, Sill started began his major junior career with the Moncton Wildcats, scoring 27 goals and 23 assists over two seasons. He was named Best Defensive Forward, among other honours, in the 2008–09 season before beginning his professional career in the Pittsburgh Penguins organization.

=== Professional ===
On May 16, 2011, the Pittsburgh Penguins announced that they had signed Sill to a two-year contract.

Sill made his NHL debut on November 16, 2013, skating 9:10 of ice time with the Penguins in a 4–1 loss to the New Jersey Devils at the Prudential Center.

In the following season, 2014–15, Sill, after 47 career NHL games without recording a point, produced his first point, an assist, on a Marcel Goc goal on January 13, 2015, against the Minnesota Wild. On January 21, in Sill's 52nd career NHL game, he scored his first NHL goal against Corey Crawford of the Chicago Blackhawks.

On February 25, 2015, Sill was traded to the Toronto Maple Leafs, along with Pittsburgh's fourth-round draft pick in 2015 and their second-round pick in 2016, in exchange for forward Daniel Winnik. Sill finished the regular season with Toronto, playing in 21 games and registering one assist.

Sill was not resigned by the Leafs and on July 15, 2015, signed a one-year, two-way contract with the Washington Capitals. He was subsequently resigned to a two-year, two way deal on June 30, 2016. In a game against the Boston Bruins on January 5, 2016, Sill boarded Bruins defenceman Adam McQuaid and was suspended two games.

After completing his third season within the Washington Capitals organization playing with AHL affiliate, the Hershey Bears, Sill left North America as a free agent after nine professional season, and on August 13, 2018, agreed to a one-year contract with Sparta Praha of the Czech Extraliga (ELH). In his lone season with Sparta Praha, Sill contributed with 11 points in 48 games in a bottom six forward role. On June 27, 2019, Sill left Prague as a free agent.

Continuing his career in Europe, Sill agreed to a one-year contract with German outfit, Kölner Haie of the Deutsche Eishockey Liga (DEL), on July 8, 2019.

Remaining with the Sharks for four years, Sill left following the 2022–23 season and continued his European career by moving to neighbouring league the ICEHL, in joining Italian based HC Pustertal Wölfe on April 25, 2023.

== Career statistics ==
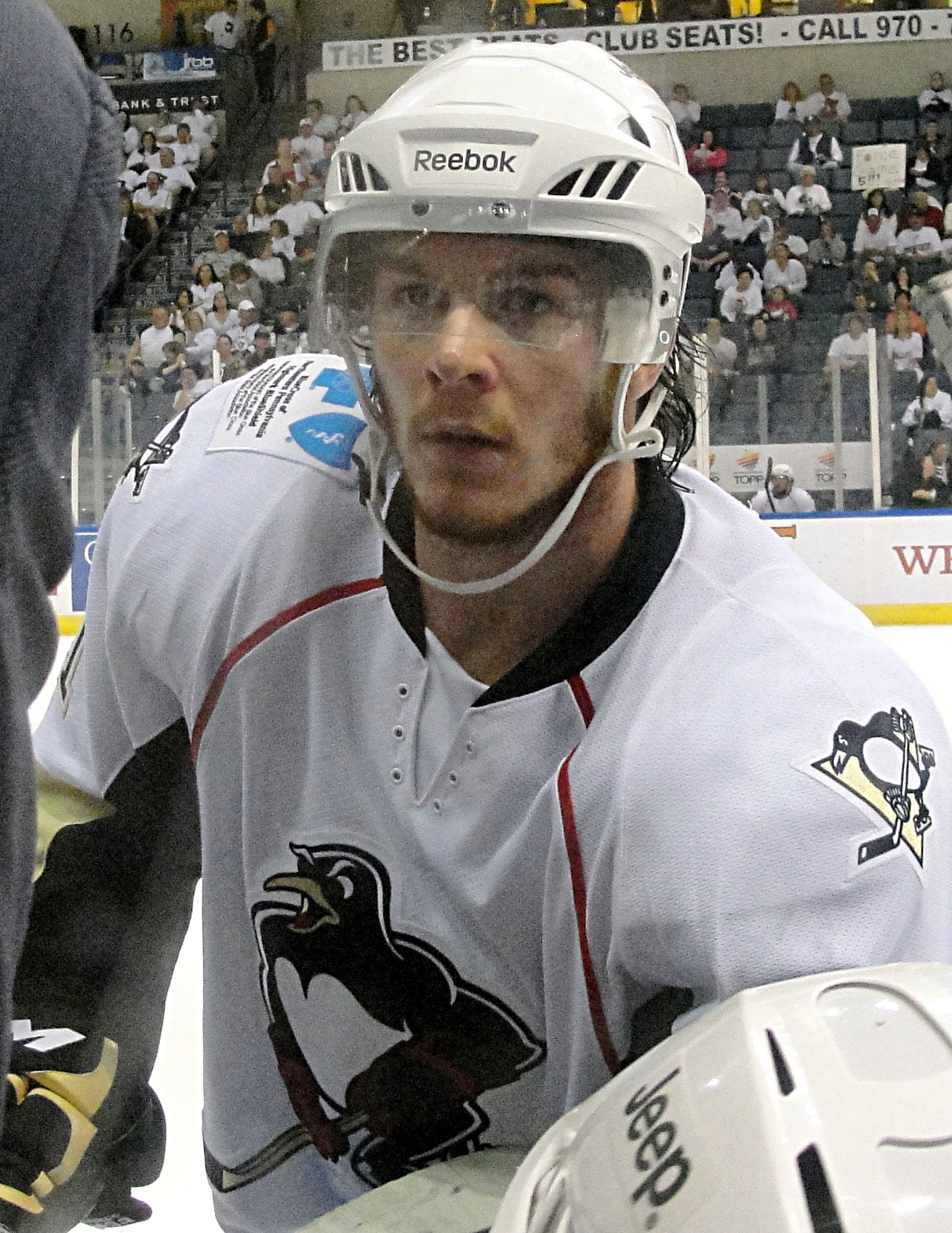
With the Wilkes-Barre/Scranton Penguins during the 2012 Calder Cup playoffs.

			Regular season					Playoffs
Season	Team	League	GP	G	A	Pts	PIM	GP	G	A	Pts	PIM
2004–05	Truro Bearcats	MJAHL	1	1	0	0	0	—	—	—	—	—
2005–06	Truro Bearcats	MJAHL	48	12	8	20	68	—	—	—	—	—
2006–07	U. of Maine	HE	6	1	1	2	2	—	—	—	—	—
2006–07	Truro Bearcats	MJAHL	6	1	0	1	18	—	—	—	—	—
2007–08	Moncton Wildcats	QMJHL	66	18	8	26	95	—	—	—	—	—
2008–09	Moncton Wildcats	QMJHL	58	9	15	24	78	10	4	1	5	10
2009–10	Wheeling Nailers	ECHL	6	1	2	3	15	—	—	—	—	—
2009–10	Wilkes-Barre/Scranton Penguins	AHL	54	5	6	11	48	4	0	0	0	2
2010–11	Wilkes-Barre/Scranton Penguins	AHL	80	11	19	30	85	12	1	2	3	6
2011–12	Wilkes-Barre/Scranton Penguins	AHL	68	10	7	17	40	12	3	1	4	0
2012–13	Wilkes-Barre/Scranton Penguins	AHL	57	4	5	9	108	15	2	2	4	6
2013–14	Wilkes-Barre/Scranton Penguins	AHL	18	3	3	6	34	17	1	2	3	18
2013–14	Pittsburgh Penguins	NHL	20	0	0	0	12	—	—	—	—	—
2014–15	Pittsburgh Penguins	NHL	42	1	2	3	60	—	—	—	—	—
2014–15	Toronto Maple Leafs	NHL	21	0	1	1	24	—	—	—	—	—
2015–16	Washington Capitals	NHL	10	1	0	1	2	—	—	—	—	—
2015–16	Hershey Bears	AHL	63	9	13	22	49	21	6	4	10	26
2016–17	Hershey Bears	AHL	67	7	9	16	30	12	0	0	0	12
2017–18	Hershey Bears	AHL	76	7	15	22	60	—	—	—	—	—
2018–19	HC Sparta Praha	ELH	48	2	9	11	64	4	0	0	0	2
2019–20	Kölner Haie	DEL	52	11	15	26	36	—	—	—	—	—
2020–21	Kölner Haie	DEL	36	2	9	11	28	—	—	—	—	—
2021–22	Kölner Haie	DEL	44	3	7	10	18	5	0	1	1	2
2022–23	Kölner Haie	DEL	47	3	9	12	44	6	0	1	1	0
NHL totals			93	2	3	5	98	—	—	—	—	—

== Awards and honors ==
Award	Year
MJAHL
Playoff MVP	2007
QMJHL
Hardest hitter	2009
Best defensive forward	2009
Hardest worker	2009
