= Alexandre Picard (ice hockey) =

Canadian ice hockey player (born 1985)

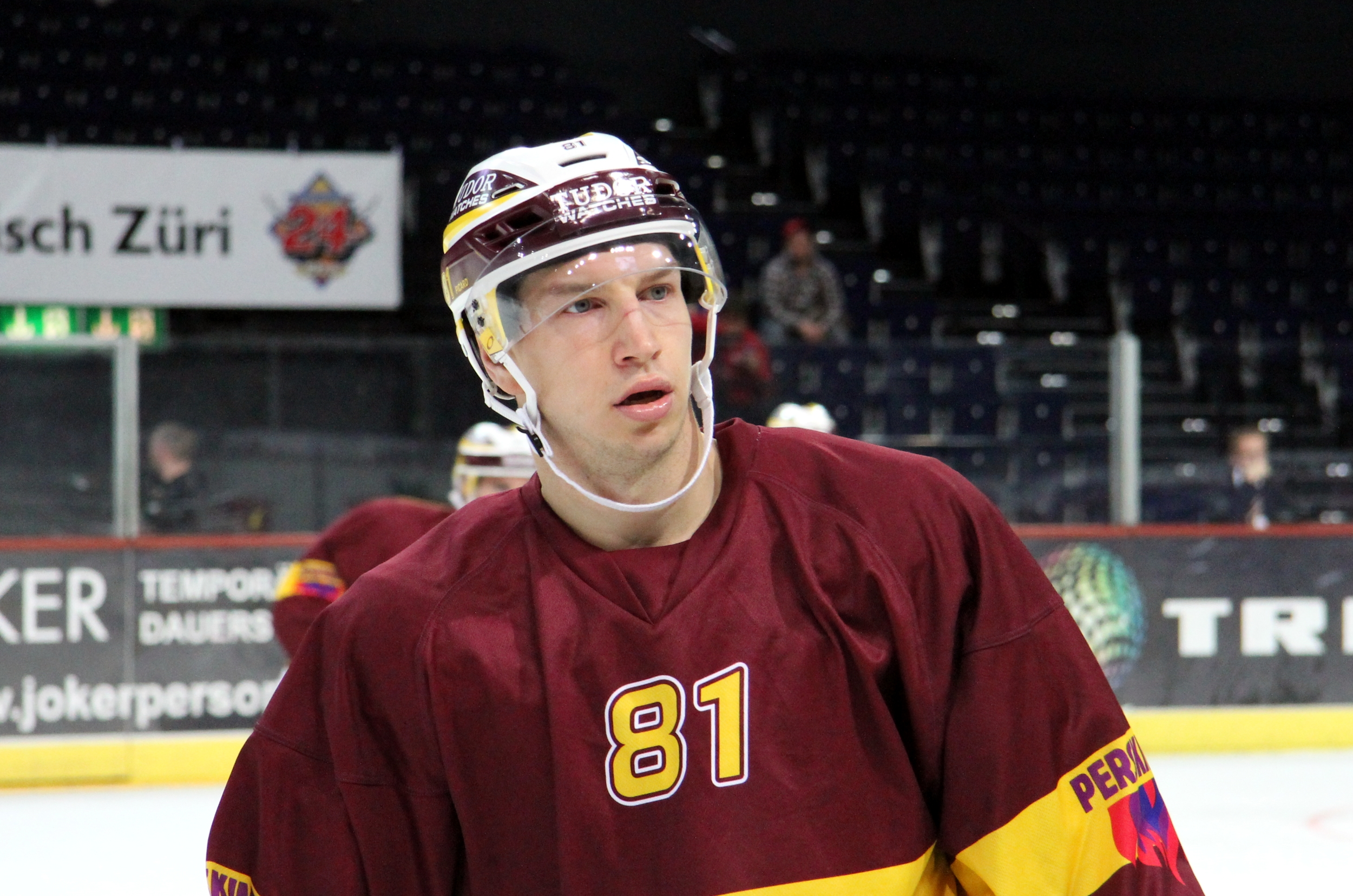
- Born: October 9, 1985 (age 40) Les Saules, Quebec, Canada
- Height: 6 ft 2 in (188 cm)
- Weight: 206 lb (93 kg; 14 st 10 lb)
- Position: Left wing
- Shoots: Left
- Czech team Former teams: HK Hradec Králové; Genève-Servette HC; Columbus Blue Jackets; HC Davos
- NHL draft: 8th overall, 2004; Columbus Blue Jackets
- Playing career: 2005–present

Medal record

Ice hockey

Representing Canada

Spengler Cup
Gold medal – first place	2015 Davos	

Alexandre Picard (born October 9, 1985) is a Canadian professional ice hockey winger who is currently playing for HK Hradec Králové in the Czech Republic. He was drafted by the Columbus Blue Jackets with the eighth overall pick of the 2004 NHL entry draft, ultimately appearing in 67 career NHL games.

== Playing career ==
As a youth, Picard played in the 1999 Quebec International Pee-Wee Hockey Tournament with a minor ice hockey team from Quebec City.

After playing four full seasons in the Quebec Major Junior Hockey League (QMJHL), Picard was drafted in the first round, eighth overall, by the Columbus Blue Jackets in the 2004 NHL entry draft. Picard joined the Syracuse Crunch, Columbus' American Hockey League (AHL) affiliate, for the 2005–06 season. He made his National Hockey League (NHL) debut with the Blue Jackets in the same season.

On March 3, 2010, the Blue Jackets traded Picard to the Phoenix Coyotes in exchange for Chad Kolarik.

On July 7, 2011, Picard signed a one-year contract with the Tampa Bay Lightning. He was assigned to Tampa Bay's. AHL affiliate, the Norfolk Admirals. On June 9, 2012, Picard won the Calder Cup with the Admirals and was named MVP of the playoffs.

Picard opted to sign a multi-year contract abroad with Swiss club Genève-Servette HC of the National League A (NLA) from the 2012–13 season. In December 2013 and in December 2014, he won the Spengler Cup with Genève-Servette. He left after three years with the club. In December 2015, Picard was added to the roster of NLA side HC Davos for the Spengler Cup, and for the third time was part of the Cup-winning team. Following his impressive showing, Davos offered him a contract for the remainder of the 2015–16 season, which he signed in January 2016.

Picard left Switzerland upon the conclusion of the 2015–16 season and signed a one-year contract with Kunlun Red Star for their inaugural Kontinental Hockey League (KHL) season, but eventually did not play for the team. On November 29, 2016, he joined HK Hradec Králové of the Czech Extraliga.

== Career statistics ==
			Regular season					Playoffs
Season	Team	League	GP	G	A	Pts	PIM	GP	G	A	Pts	PIM
2000–01	Sainte–Foy Gouverneurs	QMAAA	5	1	1	2	0	—	—	—	—	—
2001–02	Sherbrooke Castors	QMJHL	6	0	3	3	0	—	—	—	—	—
2001–02	Séminaire St–François Blizzard	QMAAA	41	21	30	51	48	8	2	7	9	8
2002–03	Sherbrooke Castors	QMJHL	66	14	15	29	41	12	4	0	4	10
2003–04	Lewiston Maineiacs	QMJHL	69	39	41	80	88	7	7	4	11	6
2004–05	Lewiston Maineiacs	QMJHL	65	40	45	85	160	8	5	2	7	18
2005–06	Syracuse Crunch	AHL	45	15	15	30	52	6	1	0	1	19
2005–06	Columbus Blue Jackets	NHL	17	0	0	0	14	—	—	—	—	—
2006–07	Syracuse Crunch	AHL	48	11	18	29	73	—	—	—	—	—
2006–07	Columbus Blue Jackets	NHL	23	0	1	1	6	—	—	—	—	—
2007–08	Syracuse Crunch	AHL	50	7	13	20	116	13	2	1	3	14
2007–08	Columbus Blue Jackets	NHL	3	0	0	0	2	—	—	—	—	—
2008–09	Columbus Blue Jackets	NHL	15	0	1	1	26	—	—	—	—	—
2008–09	Syracuse Crunch	AHL	49	22	10	32	107	—	—	—	—	—
2009–10	Columbus Blue Jackets	NHL	9	0	0	0	10	—	—	—	—	—
2009–10	Syracuse Crunch	AHL	42	17	18	35	111	—	—	—	—	—
2009–10	San Antonio Rampage	AHL	16	9	6	15	4	—	—	—	—	—
2010–11	San Antonio Rampage	AHL	59	24	22	46	84	—	—	—	—	—
2011–12	Norfolk Admirals	AHL	42	6	19	25	65	18	9	7	16	48
2012–13	Genève–Servette HC	NLA	32	14	7	21	82	6	2	4	6	4
2013–14	Genève–Servette HC	NLA	41	10	19	29	148	11	6	2	8	26
2014–15	Genève–Servette HC	NLA	30	10	10	20	22	8	1	3	4	12
2015–16	HC Davos	NLA	13	8	3	11	34	4	1	2	3	29
2016–17	Mountfield HK	ELH	25	7	13	20	91	11	3	2	5	28
2017–18	Amur Khabarovsk	KHL	28	5	6	11	28	4	0	1	1	48
2018–19	Kunlun Red Star	KHL	4	0	0	0	4	—	—	—	—	—
2018–19	Jonquière Marquis	LNAH	8	6	2	8	14	—	—	—	—	—
2018–19	Dornbirn Bulldogs	AUT	11	4	5	9	16	—	—	—	—	—
2019–20	Jonquière Marquis	LNAH	24	9	10	19	28	—	—	—	—	—
2021–22	Jonquière Marquis	LNAH	23	15	13	28	22	10	2	4	6	6
AHL totals			351	111	121	232	622	37	12	8	20	81
NHL totals			67	0	2	2	58	—	—	—	—	—
NLA totals			116	42	39	81	286	29	10	11	21	71

== Awards ==
- 2003–04 QMJHL Mike Bossy Trophy
- 2012 AHL Jack Butterfield Trophy (Playoff MVP)

Awards and achievements
Preceded by Marc-André Fleury	Winner of the Mike Bossy Trophy; 2003–04	Succeeded by Sidney Crosby
Preceded by Nikolai Zherdev	Columbus Blue Jackets first-round draft pick 2004	Succeeded by Gilbert Brulé
