= Edward Pasquale =

Canadian ice hockey player (born 1990)

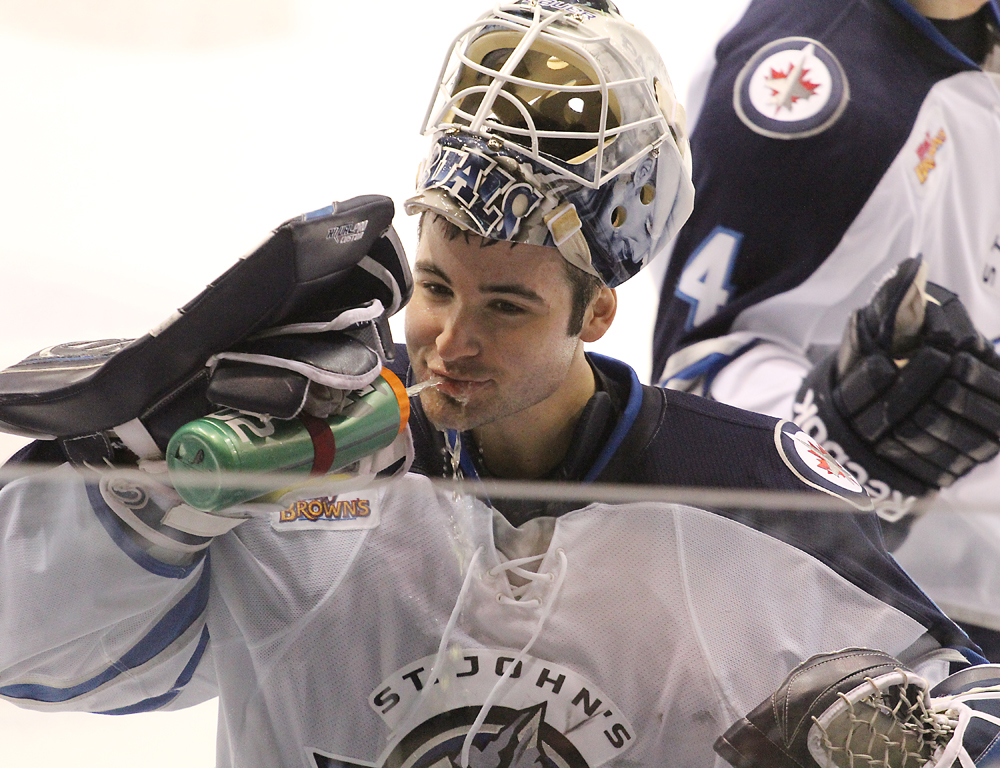
- Pasquale with the St. John's IceCaps in 2012
- Born: November 20, 1990 (age 35) Toronto, Ontario, Canada
- Height: 6 ft 2 in (188 cm)
- Weight: 216 lb (98 kg; 15 st 6 lb)
- Position: Goaltender
- Catches: Left
- ICEHL team Former teams: HC Pustertal Wölfe; Tampa Bay Lightning; Barys Astana; Lokomotiv Yaroslavl; Metallurg Magnitogorsk
- National team: Canada
- NHL draft: 117th overall, 2009; Atlanta Thrashers
- Playing career: 2010–present

Edward Robert Nito Pasquale (born November 20, 1990) is a Canadian professional ice hockey goaltender currently playing for HC Pustertal Wölfe of the ICE Hockey League. He most recently played for Barys Astana in the Kontinental Hockey League (KHL). He has formerly played with the Tampa Bay Lightning of the National Hockey League (NHL). Pasquale was selected by the Atlanta Thrashers in the fourth round (117th overall) of the 2009 NHL entry draft.

== Playing career ==
=== Junior ===
Pasquale played in the Ontario Hockey League for the Belleville Bulls for parts of both the 2006/07 and 2007/08 seasons. Midway through his second season in Belleville, he was traded to the Saginaw Spirit. He would spend the next two and a half seasons here, becoming the Spirit starter in both the 2008/09 and 2009/10 seasons. Praised for traits such as consistency, Pasquale was named to the OHL's third all-star team for the 2008/09 OHL season. He also played in the 2009 CHL Top Prospects game. In his final OHL season, Pasquale stopped over 1800 shots.

=== Professional ===
The Atlanta Thrashers selected Pasquale, the 117th overall selection of the 2009 NHL entry draft. Following his junior career, Pasquale was assigned to the Chicago Wolves of the American Hockey League. Here Pasquale filled the role of backup goaltender, playing in 24 games. He also spent some time in the ECHL, playing with the Gwinnett Gladiators. During the 2011 offseason, the Thrashers relocated to Winnipeg, Manitoba, and became the Jets. Pasquale started the 2011–12 season by attending Jets training camp before he was assigned to AHL affiliate, the St. John's IceCaps for the remainder of his entry-level contract.

On June 27, 2014, Pasquale was traded by the Jets in an exchange of draft picks at the 2014 NHL entry draft to the Washington Capitals. Pasquale would never play in a competitive game in the Capitals organization as he sat out the 2014–15 season, recuperating from hip surgery.

On July 3, 2015, Pasquale as a free agent, signed a one-year, two-way contract with the St. John's IceCaps, now affiliated with the Montreal Canadiens. On October 13, he would be sent down to the Canadiens' ECHL affiliate, the Brampton Beast.

On July 1, 2016, Pasquale signed as a free agent to a one-year, two-way contract with the Detroit Red Wings. During the 2016–17 season, Pasquale appeared in 29 games with the Grand Rapids Griffins, posting a 15–9–5 record, a 2.43 goals against average (GAA), a .919 save percentage and four shutouts, helping lead Grand Rapids to the Calder Cup.

On July 1, 2017, Pasquale left the Red Wings and signed as a free agent to a one-year, two-way contract with the Edmonton Oilers. On January 31, 2018, the Oilers traded Pasquale to the Tampa Bay Lightning for future considerations. On December 4, 2018, Pasquale made his NHL debut against the Detroit Red Wings at Little Caesars Arena. Pasquale helped the Lightning defeat the Red Wings that night in a 6–5 shootout win. He would play two more games with the Lightning, including the final game of the year, where he helped them beat the Boston Bruins, which tied the NHL record for most wins in a season.

In his second season with the Syracuse Crunch, he won the Harry "Hap" Holmes Memorial Award. The award goes to the goaltenders of the American Hockey League team with the lowest goals against average and who have appeared in at least 25 regular season games.

As an impending free agent, on June 14, 2019, Pasquale opted to sign his first contract abroad since turning professional in 2010, agreeing to a one-year contract with Kazakh-based club, Barys Nur-Sultan of the KHL. In his debut season in the KHL, Pasquale had a successful 2019–20 campaign, registering a 2.03 goals against average and picking up goaltender of the week honours on two occasions to help Barys qualify for the post-season.

As a free agent from Barys, Pasquale was rewarded with an improved two-year contract with Russian-based club, Lokomotiv Yaroslavl, on May 1, 2020.

On 1 June 2022, Pasquale as a free agent from Lokomotiv, continued his career in the KHL by agreeing to a one-year contract with Metallurg Magnitogorsk. In the 2022–23 season, Pasquale appeared in a career high 50 regular season games, posting 23 wins and helped Metallurg reach the Conference semifinals.

As a free agent, Pasquale opted to return to former club Barys Astana, in signing a two-year contract on July 1, 2023.

== International play ==
In January 2022, Pasquale was selected to play for Team Canada at the 2022 Winter Olympics.

== Career statistics ==
=== Regular season and playoffs ===
			Regular season									Playoffs
Season	Team	League	GP	W	L	OTL	MIN	GA	SO	GAA	SV%	GP	W	L	MIN	GA	SO	GAA	SV%
2006–07	Belleville Bulls	OHL	7	4	1	0	367	19	0	3.10	.917	—	—	—	—	—	—	—	—
2007–08	Belleville Bulls	OHL	10	4	4	2	558	27	1	2.90	.900	—	—	—	—	—	—	—	—
2007–08	Saginaw Spirit	OHL	13	8	5	0	661	39	0	3.54	.890	2	0	1	97	5	0	3.09	.891
2008–09	Saginaw Spirit	OHL	61	32	21	6	1821	178	0	3.02	.911	8	4	4	530	34	0	3.85	.895
2009–10	Saginaw Spirit	OHL	51	27	17	5	2898	153	1	3.17	.916	6	2	4	361	14	0	2.33	.941
2010–11	Chicago Wolves	AHL	24	11	11	1	1372	67	1	2.93	.900	—	—	—	—	—	—	—	—
2010–11	Gwinnett Gladiators	ECHL	12	7	4	0	715	44	0	3.69	.898	—	—	—	—	—	—	—	—
2011–12	St. John's IceCaps	AHL	38	23	12	1	2163	87	4	2.41	.911	15	7	8	917	37	0	2.42	.923
2012–13	St. John's IceCaps	AHL	43	15	23	4	2453	114	4	2.79	.907	—	—	—	—	—	—	—	—
2013–14	St. John's IceCaps	AHL	31	17	13	1	1851	75	1	2.43	.920	—	—	—	—	—	—	—	—
2015–16	Brampton Beast	ECHL	12	4	6	2	691	40	1	3.47	.890	—	—	—	—	—	—	—	—
2015–16	St. John's IceCaps	AHL	30	13	10	3	1531	67	0	2.62	.919	—	—	—	—	—	—	—	—
2016–17	Grand Rapids Griffins	AHL	29	15	9	5	1654	67	4	2.43	.919	1	0	0	41	0	0	0.00	1.000
2017–18	Bakersfield Condors	AHL	16	6	5	4	947	41	1	2.60	.910	—	—	—	—	—	—	—	—
2017–18	Syracuse Crunch	AHL	15	10	1	3	835	24	1	1.72	.938	3	2	1	176	12	0	4.09	.840
2018–19	Syracuse Crunch	AHL	45	27	12	6	2650	104	4	2.35	.916	4	1	3	228	11	0	2.90	.898
2018–19	Tampa Bay Lightning	NHL	3	2	1	0	182	12	0	3.96	.882	—	—	—	—	—	—	—	—
2019–20	Barys Nur-Sultan	KHL	46	24	18	1	2605	88	1	2.03	.930	5	4	1	281	6	2	1.28	.960
2020–21	Lokomotiv Yaroslavl	KHL	41	25	11	3	2393	76	5	1.91	.925	11	7	4	675	14	4	1.24	.951
2021–22	Lokomotiv Yaroslavl	KHL	38	19	16	3	2296	76	1	1.99	.916	2	0	2	121	7	0	3.46	.854
2022–23	Metallurg Magnitogorsk	KHL	50	23	17	4	2749	103	3	2.25	.927	10	4	4	585	26	0	2.67	.906
2023–24	Barys Astana	KHL	36	4	24	5	1983	103	0	3.12	.904	—	—	—	—	—	—	—	—
2024–25	HC Pustertal Wölfe	ICEHL	24	8	14	1	1428	63	1	2.65	.911	8	4	4	457	17	2	2.23	.919
2025–26	HC Pustertal Wölfe	ICEHL	41	26	15	0	2414	94	4	2.33	.911	13	8	5	847	33	3	2.34	.915
NHL totals			3	2	1	0	182	12	0	3.96	.882	—	—	—	—	—	—	—	—
KHL totals			211	95	86	16	12,027	446	10	2.23	.921	28	15	11	1,662	53	6	1.91	.930

=== International ===
Year	Team	Event	Result	GP	W	L	T/OT	MIN	GA	SO	GAA	SV%
2022	Canada	OG	6th	2	1	1	0	118	5	0	2.55	.902
Senior totals				2	1	1	0	118	5	0	2.55	.902

== Awards and honours ==
Award	Year
OHL
Third All-Star Team	2009
AHL
All-Rookie Team	2012
Calder Cup (Grand Rapids Griffins)	2017
Harry "Hap" Holmes Memorial Award	2019
KHL
Goaltender of the Year	2021
