= John Albert (ice hockey) =

American ice hockey player (born 1989)

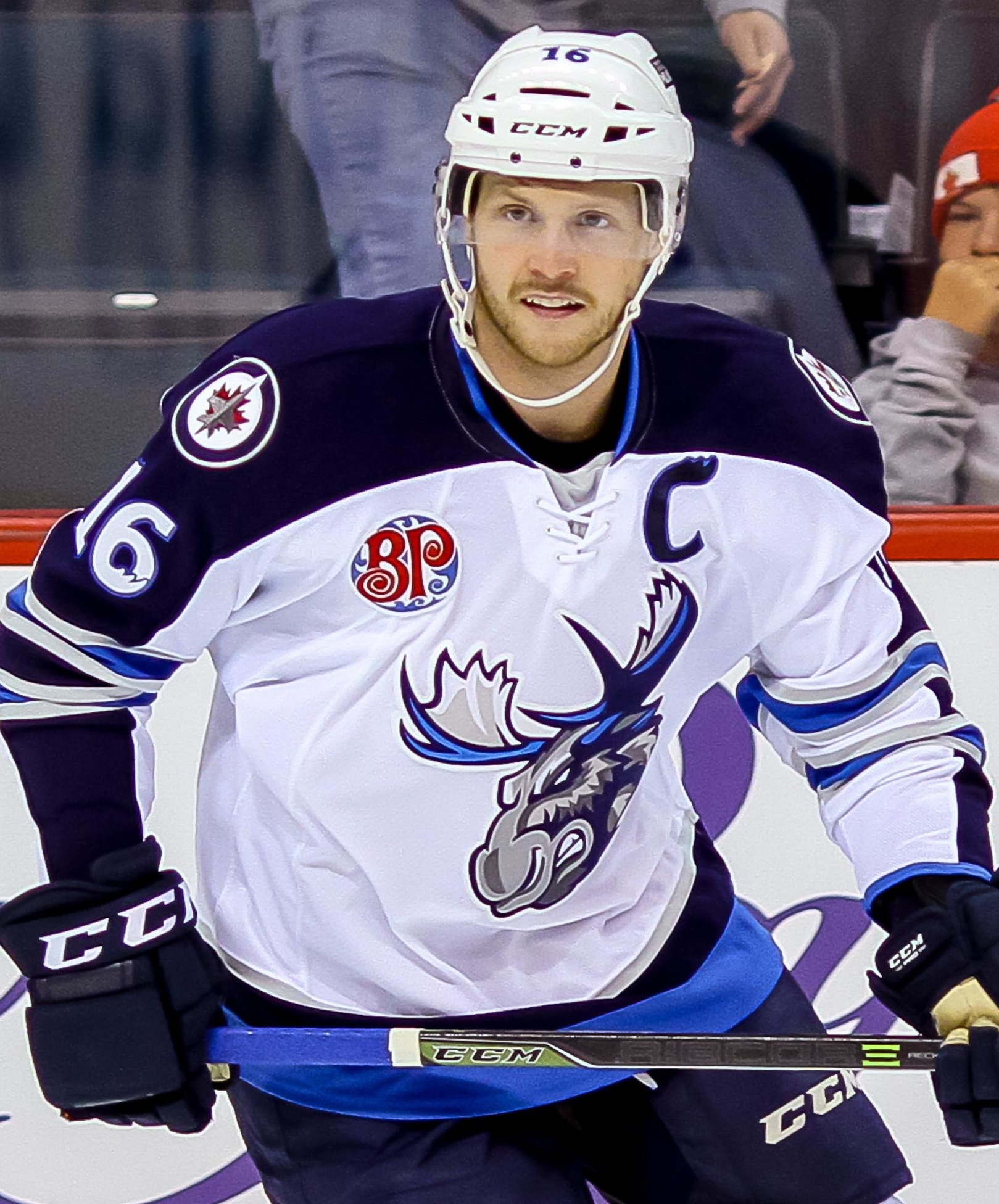
- Albert with the Manitoba Moose during the 2015-16 season
- Born: January 19, 1989 (age 37) Cleveland, Ohio, U.S.
- Height: 5 ft 11 in (180 cm)
- Weight: 179 lb (81 kg; 12 st 11 lb)
- Position: Centre
- Shot: Left
- team Former teams: Free agent Winnipeg Jets; Oulun Kärpät
- NHL draft: 175th overall, 2007; Atlanta Thrashers
- Playing career: 2011–2023

John Albert (born January 19, 1989) is an American professional ice hockey forward who is currently an unrestricted free agent. He most recently played as captain for the Toledo Walleye in the ECHL. He was selected by the Atlanta Thrashers in the 6th round (175th overall) of the 2007 NHL entry draft and has formerly played with the Winnipeg Jets. Albert was born in Cleveland, Ohio, but grew up in Concord Township, Ohio.

== Playing career ==
Before turning professional, Albert played NCAA college hockey with Ohio State University.

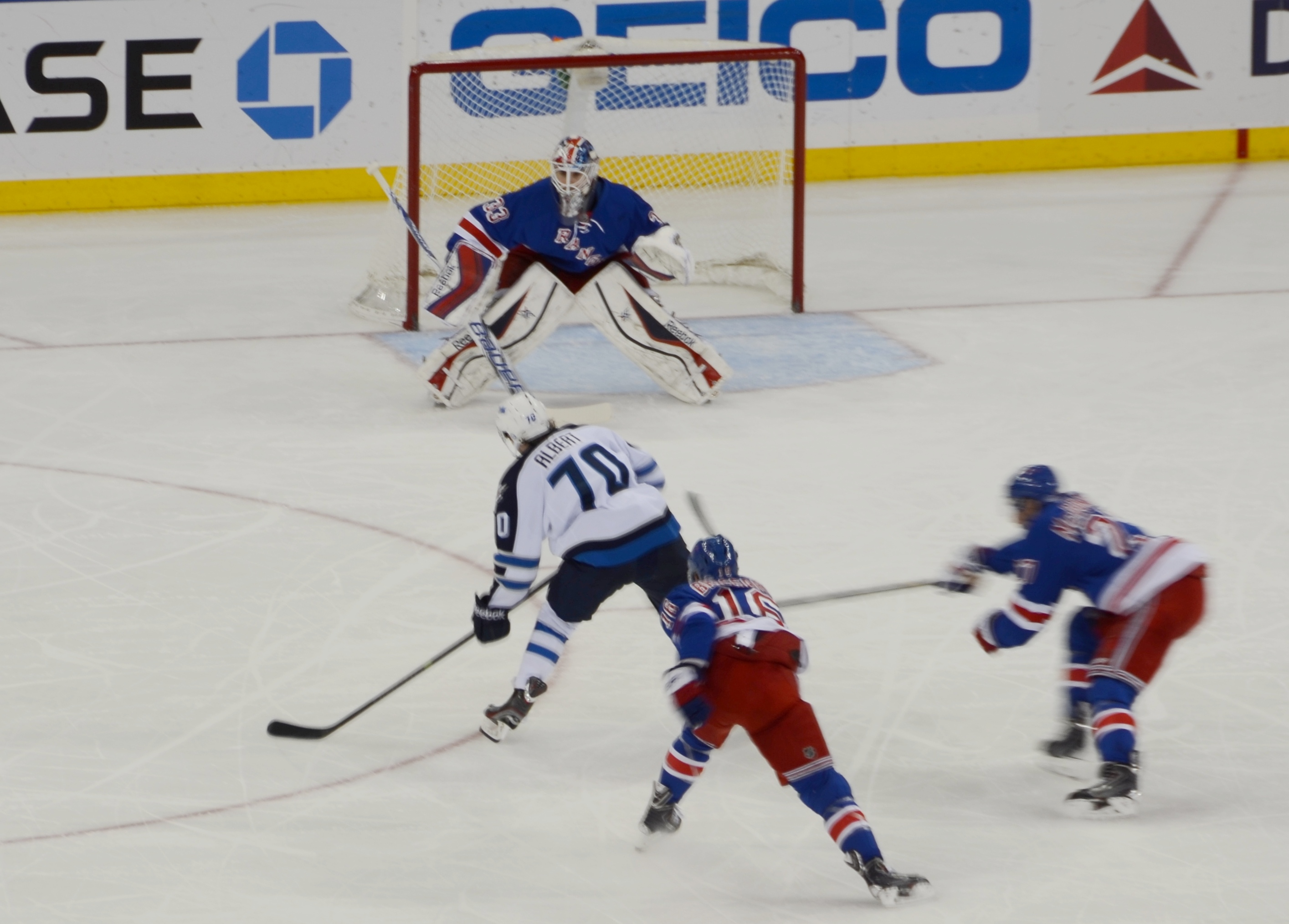
Albert scoring his only NHL goal in his only NHL game at Madison Square Garden

On July 20, 2011, Albert signed with the St. John's IceCaps of the American Hockey League (AHL) for the 2011–12 AHL season. On December 2, 2013, one day after being recalled by the Winnipeg Jets, Albert scored his first NHL goal on his first shot on goal in the league, beating goalie Cam Talbot of the New York Rangers in Winnipeg's 5–2 victory at Madison Square Gardens.

On June 29, 2015, the Jets gave Albert a qualifying offer to retain his negotiation rights. Albert later signed an AHL contract with the Jets' new affiliate, the Manitoba Moose, on September 16, 2015. After attending the Jets training camp on a try-out, he joined the Manitoba Moose and was named team captain.

On July 3, 2016, Albert ended his long tenure within the Thrashers/Jets organization, joining Oulun Kärpät of the Finnish Liiga. In the 2016–17 season, Albert made a seamless transition to European hockey and contributed with 12 goals and 24 points in 42 games for Kärpät.

On July 3, 2017, after a year's absence, Albert returned to the NHL in securing a one-year, two-way contract with the Washington Capitals. During the 2017–18 season, on February 9, 2018, the Capitals traded Albert to the New York Rangers organization. He was directly assigned to the Rangers AHL affiliate, the Hartford Wolf Pack, for the remainder of the season.

As a free agent from the Rangers, Albert returned to Europe in agreeing to a one-year deal with German club, Grizzlys Wolfsburg, of the Deutsche Eishockey Liga on July 3, 2018. During preparation with the Grizzlys for the 2018–19 campaign, Albert suffered a long-term injury, forcing him out for the entirety of the season.

Returning to North America, Albert resumed his professional career in the 2019–20 season after signing a contract with the Jacksonville Icemen of the ECHL, a secondary affiliate to the Winnipeg Jets, on October 3, 2019. In the 2019–20 season, Albert collected 29 points through 44 regular season games before the season was cancelled due to the COVID-19 pandemic.

As a free agent into the pandemic-delayed 2020–21 season, Albert belatedly joined the Wichita Thunder of the ECHL on January 22, 2021. He split the season between the Thunder and the Rapid City Rush, finishing with a combined 11 points in 30 games.

Albert continued his career in the ECHL, agreeing to return for a fourth season in the league by joining the Toledo Walleye as a free agent on September 29, 2021.

In November 2022, John Albert was named the captain of the Toledo Walleye.

== Career statistics ==
=== Regular season and playoffs ===
			Regular season					Playoffs
Season	Team	League	GP	G	A	Pts	PIM	GP	G	A	Pts	PIM
2004–05	Cleveland Jr. Barons	NAHL	3	0	0	0	0	—	—	—	—	—
2005–06	U.S. NTDP U17	USDP	19	8	15	23	25	—	—	—	—	—
2005–06	U.S. NTDP U18	NAHL	36	8	15	23	23	—	—	—	—	—
2006–07	U.S. NTDP U18	USDP	32	6	14	20	10	—	—	—	—	—
2006–07	U.S. NTDP U18	NAHL	15	4	9	13	4	—	—	—	—	—
2007–08	Ohio State University	CCHA	41	4	17	21	10	—	—	—	—	—
2008–09	Ohio State University	CCHA	42	11	28	39	20	—	—	—	—	—
2009–10	Ohio State University	CCHA	39	6	24	30	20	—	—	—	—	—
2010–11	Ohio State University	CCHA	37	12	22	34	18	—	—	—	—	—
2011–12	St. John's IceCaps	AHL	64	9	18	27	28	15	3	2	5	8
2012–13	St. John's IceCaps	AHL	24	3	2	5	10	—	—	—	—	—
2013–14	St. John's IceCaps	AHL	63	28	17	45	20	21	1	6	7	18
2013–14	Winnipeg Jets	NHL	9	1	0	1	0	—	—	—	—	—
2014–15	St. John's IceCaps	AHL	66	16	26	42	26	—	—	—	—	—
2015–16	Manitoba Moose	AHL	66	12	24	36	20	—	—	—	—	—
2016–17	Kärpät	Liiga	42	12	12	24	16	2	1	1	2	0
2017–18	Hershey Bears	AHL	33	3	8	11	10	—	—	—	—	—
2017–18	Hartford Wolf Pack	AHL	23	1	3	4	8	—	—	—	—	—
2019–20	Jacksonville Icemen	ECHL	44	8	21	29	4	—	—	—	—	—
2020–21	Wichita Thunder	ECHL	18	4	5	9	4	—	—	—	—	—
2020–21	Rapid City Rush	ECHL	12	1	1	2	6	—	—	—	—	—
2021–22	Toledo Walleye	ECHL	51	24	24	48	2	21	10	7	17	6
2022–23	Toledo Walleye	ECHL	47	5	14	19	14	9	0	0	0	0
AHL totals			339	72	98	170	122	36	4	8	12	26
NHL totals			9	1	0	1	0	—	—	—	—	—
ECHL totals			172	42	65	107	30	30	10	7	17	6

Medal record

Representing United States

Ice hockey

IIHF World U18 Championships
Silver medal – second place	2007 Tampere	

World U-17 Hockey Challenge
Silver medal – second place	2006 Saskatchewan	

=== International ===
Year	Team	Event	GP	G	A	Pts	PIM
2006	United States	U17	6	1	4	5	2
2007	United States	WJC18	7	1	2	3	2
Junior totals			13	2	6	8	4
