= Pierre-Cédric Labrie =

Canadian ice hockey player

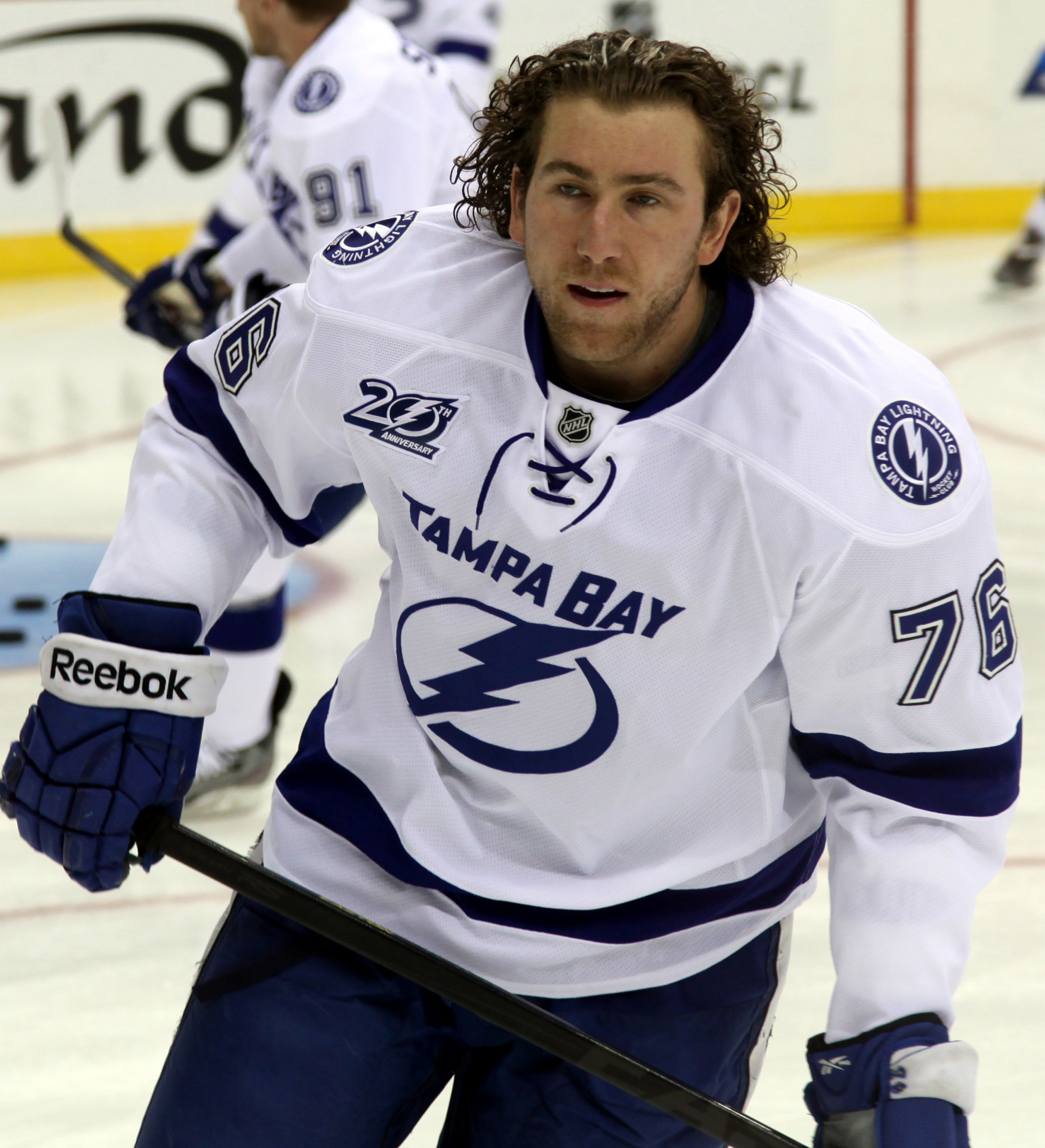
- Labrie with the Tampa Bay Lightning in 2013
- Born: June 12, 1986 (age 40) Baie-Comeau, Quebec, Canada
- Height: 6 ft 3 in (191 cm)
- Weight: 234 lb (106 kg; 16 st 10 lb)
- Position: Left wing
- Shoots: Left
- team Former teams: Free agent Tampa Bay Lightning; Eisbären Berlin
- NHL draft: Undrafted
- Playing career: 2007–present

Pierre-Cédric "Nacho" Labrie (born June 12, 1986) is a Canadian professional ice hockey left winger currently playing for the Jonquière Marquis of the LNAH.

== Playing career ==
=== Juniors and early life ===
As a youth, Labrie played in the 2000 Quebec International Pee-Wee Hockey Tournament with a minor ice hockey team from Baie-Comeau.

Labrie left hockey at the age of 17 when he was cut from the Quebec Remparts of the Quebec Major Junior Hockey League. He worked the night shift at a convenience store and worked at a restaurant as a chef's assistant. Labrie found it within himself to restart his hockey career completely, first playing in a weekend rec league, then Junior A, Juniors, the AHL, and finally making it to the NHL.

=== Professional ===
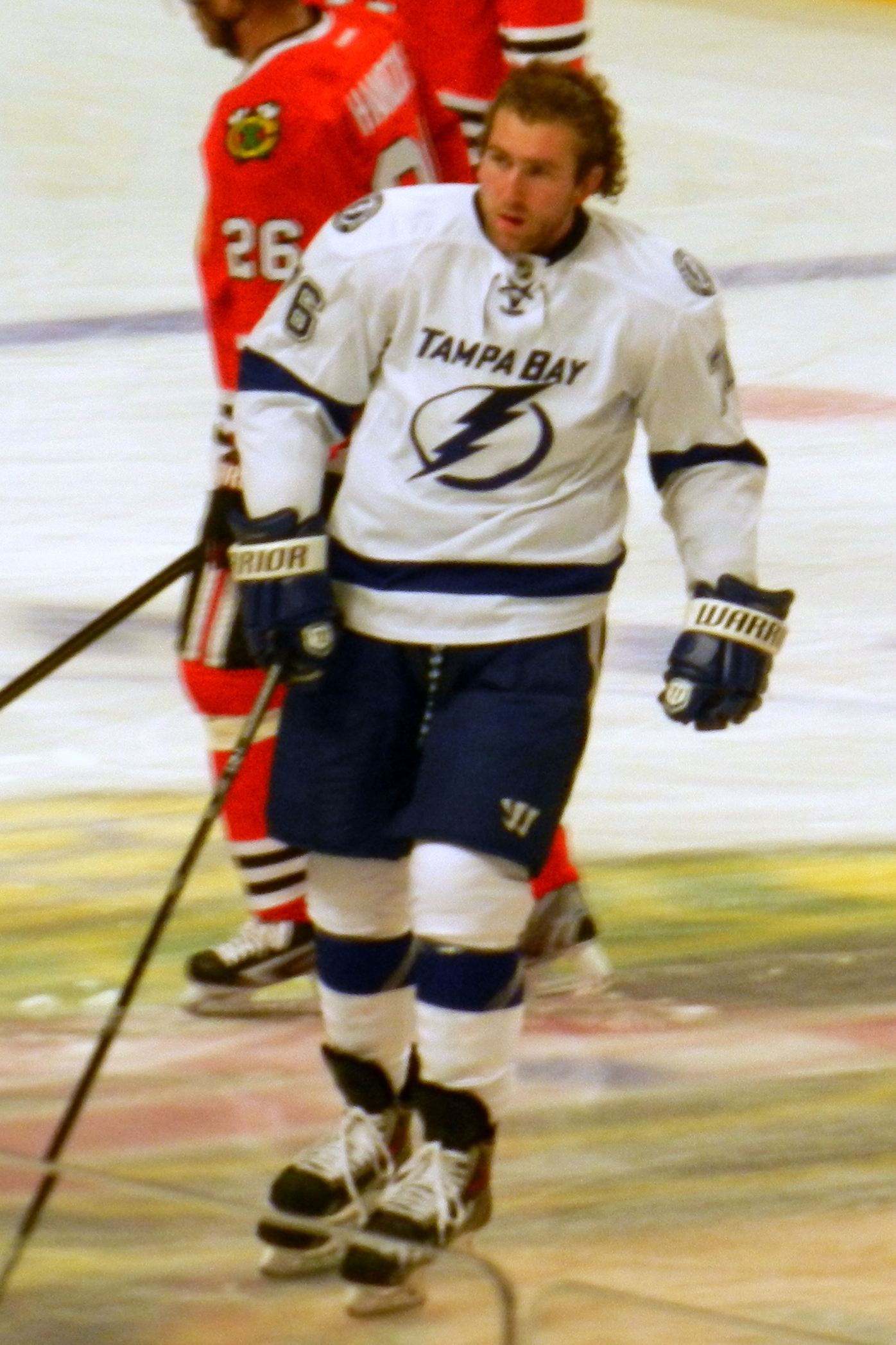
Labrie as a member of the Tampa Bay Lightning.

On January 7, 2012, Labrie made his NHL debut playing with the Tampa Bay Lightning in a 3–1 defeat on the road against the Montreal Canadiens. He later recorded his first NHL point, an assist, in a victory over the Phoenix Coyotes on January 21, 2012.

On July 1, 2014, Labrie signed a one-year contract as a free agent with the Chicago Blackhawks. They assigned him to their AHL-affiliate, the Rockford IceHogs on September 30, 2014. In the 2014-15 season, Labrie added a veteran presence in producing 16 points in 60 games. On June 18, 2015, Labrie was re-signed to a one-year AHL contract to remain with the IceHogs.

In the following off-season, Labrie opted to remain within the Blackhawks organization, agreeing to another one-year, two-way NHL contract on July 1, 2016.

On July 1, 2017, Labrie signed as a free agent to a one-year, two-way contract with the Nashville Predators for the 2017–18 season. On February 26, 2018, Labrie along with Trevor Murphy was traded by the Predators to the Arizona Coyotes in exchange for Tyler Gaudet and John Ramage. He was immediately assigned and played out the remainder of the season with affiliate, the Tucson Roadrunners.

As a free agent in the following off-season, Labrie agreed to his first ECHL contract, signing a one-year deal with the Wichita Thunder on August 15, 2018. Labrie contributed with 47 points through 60 games with the Thunder before signing a tryout with Rockford IceHogs of the AHL to end the season.

In the following off-season, Labrie opted to pursue a contract in Europe for the first time in his career, accepting an initial try-out contract with German club, Eisbären Berlin of the DEL, on July 26, 2019 which he later secured a one-year contract for the 2019–20 DEL season after the pre-season games.

Following two seasons in Germany, Labrie opted to return to North America for the 2021–22 season, signing a professional try-out contract, after making the opening night roster with the Hartford Wolf Pack of the AHL on October 15, 2021. He posted 2 goals and 8 points through 21 games before leaving the team after securing a two-year AHL contract with former team, the Syracuse Crunch, on January 7, 2022.

Prior to the commencement of the 2022–23 season, Labrie was signed to a one-year, two-way NHL contract with the Lightning on October 9, 2022.

On January 9, 2024, the Jonquière Marquis of the LNAH signed Labrie to a contract out of free agency. It was announced Labrie would wear number 22 for the team.

== Personal life ==
Labrie is married to Jana Piuze-Roy, the daughter of former NHL goaltender Patrick Roy. Labrie and Roy have two boys together.

== Career statistics ==
| | | | Regular season | | | | | Playoffs |
| Season | Team | League | GP | G | A | Pts | PIM | GP | G | A | Pts | PIM |
|---|---|---|---|---|---|---|---|---|---|---|---|---|
| 2003–04 | Coaticook Frontaliers | QJAHL | 46 | 13 | 12 | 25 | 96 | — | — | — | — | — |
| 2003–04 | Quebec Remparts | QMJHL | 1 | 0 | 0 | 0 | 0 | — | — | — | — | — |
| 2004–05 | Coaticook Frontaliers | QJAHL | 15 | 3 | 4 | 7 | 59 | — | — | — | — | — |
| 2005–06 | Restigouche Tigers | MJAHL | 54 | 43 | 43 | 86 | 153 | — | — | — | — | — |
| 2005–06 | Baie-Comeau Drakkar | QMJHL | — | — | — | — | — | 4 | 2 | 2 | 4 | 6 |
| 2006–07 | Baie-Comeau Drakkar | QMJHL | 68 | 35 | 28 | 63 | 113 | 11 | 8 | 6 | 14 | 35 |
| 2007–08 | Manitoba Moose | AHL | 67 | 7 | 11 | 18 | 108 | 3 | 0 | 0 | 0 | 2 |
| 2008–09 | Manitoba Moose | AHL | 63 | 6 | 9 | 15 | 79 | 14 | 0 | 1 | 1 | 37 |
| 2009–10 | Manitoba Moose | AHL | 45 | 5 | 1 | 6 | 69 | — | — | — | — | — |
| 2009–10 | Peoria Rivermen | AHL | 16 | 0 | 1 | 1 | 16 | — | — | — | — | — |
| 2010–11 | Norfolk Admirals | AHL | 64 | 7 | 19 | 26 | 148 | 6 | 0 | 1 | 1 | 4 |
| 2011–12 | Norfolk Admirals | AHL | 56 | 14 | 21 | 35 | 107 | 18 | 5 | 4 | 9 | 34 |
| 2011–12 | Tampa Bay Lightning | NHL | 14 | 0 | 2 | 2 | 15 | — | — | — | — | — |
| 2012–13 | Syracuse Crunch | AHL | 39 | 11 | 7 | 18 | 83 | — | — | — | — | — |
| 2012–13 | Tampa Bay Lightning | NHL | 19 | 2 | 1 | 3 | 30 | — | — | — | — | — |
| 2013–14 | Tampa Bay Lightning | NHL | 13 | 0 | 0 | 0 | 20 | — | — | — | — | — |
| 2013–14 | Syracuse Crunch | AHL | 38 | 2 | 4 | 6 | 112 | — | — | — | — | — |
| 2014–15 | Rockford IceHogs | AHL | 60 | 9 | 7 | 16 | 113 | 8 | 0 | 1 | 1 | 28 |
| 2015–16 | Rockford IceHogs | AHL | 66 | 20 | 14 | 34 | 102 | — | — | — | — | — |
| 2016–17 | Rockford IceHogs | AHL | 52 | 1 | 7 | 8 | 96 | — | — | — | — | — |
| 2017–18 | Milwaukee Admirals | AHL | 50 | 5 | 7 | 12 | 57 | — | — | — | — | — |
| 2017–18 | Tucson Roadrunners | AHL | 8 | 1 | 0 | 1 | 9 | 3 | 0 | 0 | 0 | 0 |
| 2018–19 | Wichita Thunder | ECHL | 60 | 19 | 28 | 47 | 180 | — | — | — | — | — |
| 2018–19 | Bakersfield Condors | AHL | 5 | 1 | 1 | 2 | 6 | — | — | — | — | — |
| 2019–20 | Eisbären Berlin | DEL | 51 | 11 | 9 | 20 | 68 | — | — | — | — | — |
| 2020–21 | Eisbären Berlin | DEL | 19 | 2 | 0 | 2 | 8 | 9 | 0 | 1 | 1 | 0 |
| 2021–22 | Hartford Wolf Pack | AHL | 21 | 2 | 6 | 8 | 23 | — | — | — | — | — |
| 2021–22 | Syracuse Crunch | AHL | 35 | 4 | 4 | 8 | 31 | 3 | 0 | 0 | 0 | 2 |
| 2022–23 | Syracuse Crunch | AHL | 23 | 0 | 1 | 1 | 41 | 1 | 0 | 0 | 0 | 2 |
| AHL totals | | | 708 | 95 | 120 | 215 | 1200 | 56 | 5 | 7 | 12 | 109 |
| NHL totals | | | 46 | 2 | 3 | 5 | 65 | — | — | — | — | — |

== Awards and honours ==
| Award | Year |
|---|---|
AHL
| Calder Cup (Norfolk Admirals) | 2012 |
DEL
| Champion (Eisbären Berlin) | 2021 |
