= Hunter Tremblay =

Canadian ice hockey player (born 1986)

- Born: January 15, 1986 (age 40) Timmins, Ontario, Canada
- Height: 5 ft 10 in (178 cm)
- Weight: 175 lb (79 kg; 12 st 7 lb)
- Position: Left wing
- Shot: Left
- Played for: Oklahoma City Barons; St. John's IceCaps
- NHL draft: Undrafted
- Playing career: 2011–2015

Hunter Tremblay (born January 15, 1986) is a Canadian professional ice hockey winger who is currently playing for the St. John's IceCaps in the American Hockey League.

== Career ==
Prior to turning professional, Tremblay attended the University of New Brunswick, where he played four seasons with the UNB Varsity Reds ice hockey team which competes within the Atlantic University Sport (AUS) conference of Canadian Interuniversity Sport. He was a member of the team that won the 2011 Atlantic and Canadian Interuniversity Sport hockey championships.

Tremblay signed a one-year deal with the St. John's IceCaps of the AHL on July 5, 2012.

== Awards and honors ==
Award	Year
College
Atlantic University Sport Rookie of the Year	2007–08
Canadian Interuniversity Sport Player of the Year	2009–10
Atlantic University Sport First Team All-Star	2010–11
