= Derek Meech =

Canadian ice hockey player (born 1984)

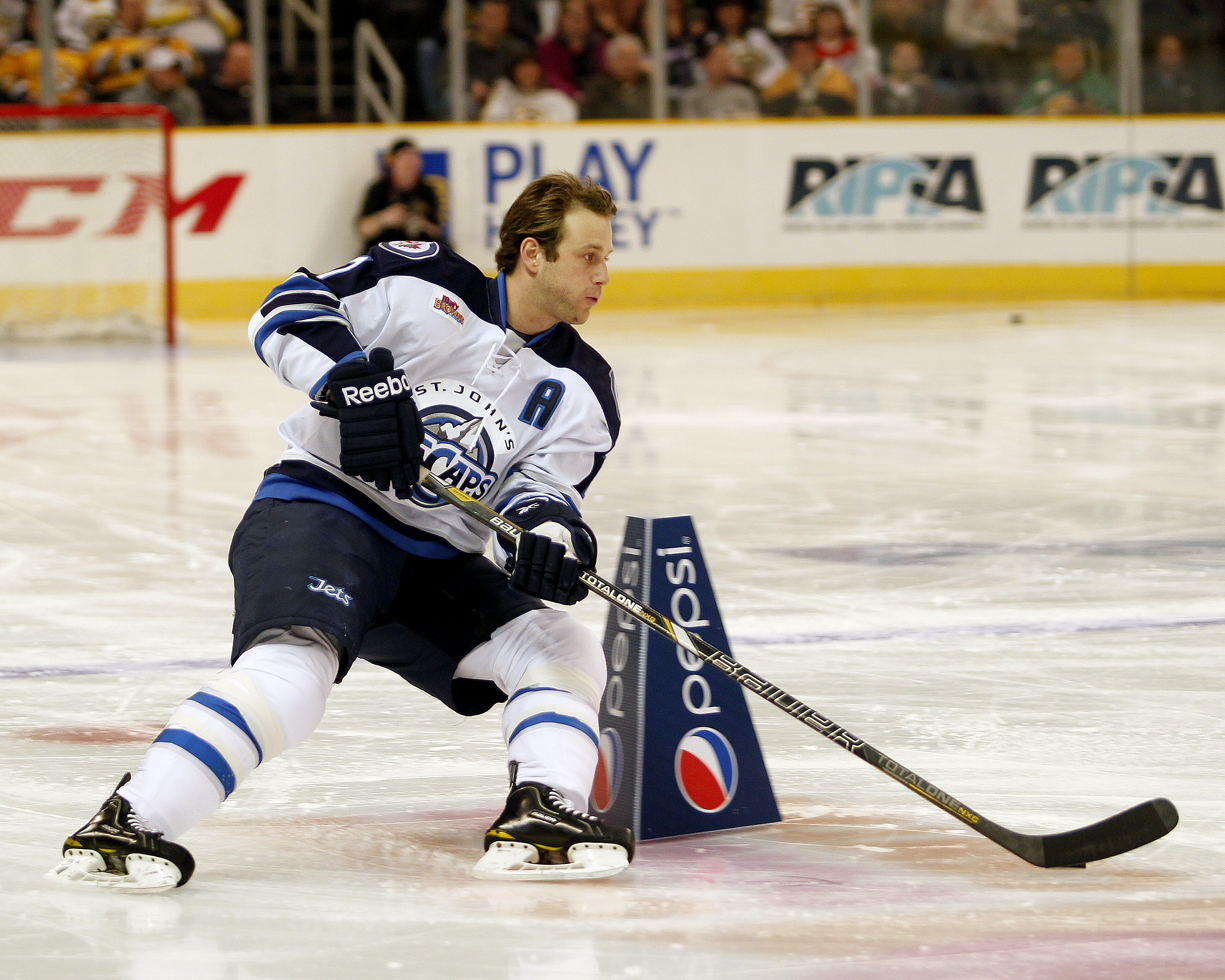
- With the St. John's IceCaps in 2013 AHL All-Star Game
- Born: April 21, 1984 (age 42) Winnipeg, Manitoba, Canada
- Height: 5 ft 11 in (180 cm)
- Weight: 200 lb (91 kg; 14 st 4 lb)
- Position: Defence
- Shot: Left
- Played for: Detroit Red Wings; Winnipeg Jets; HC Dinamo Minsk; Malmö Redhawks
- NHL draft: 229nd overall, 2002; Detroit Red Wings
- Playing career: 2006–2016

Derek Meech (born April 21, 1984) is a Canadian former professional ice hockey defenceman and winger. He last played for the Malmö Redhawks of the Swedish Hockey League (SHL) and previously appeared in the National Hockey League (NHL) with the Detroit Red Wings and Winnipeg Jets.

== Playing career ==
Meech played his junior hockey for the Red Deer Rebels of the Western Hockey League. There, he teamed with future NHL star Dion Phaneuf as the team's top defensive pairing. On June 23, 2002, he was drafted 229th overall in the 7th round of the 2002 NHL entry draft.

Meech made his NHL debut on December 7, 2006 at Joe Louis Arena, Detroit, Michigan against the St. Louis Blues. He played in 4 NHL games during the 2006–07 NHL season. While playing for the Grand Rapids Griffins of the American Hockey League, Meech was named an All Star after posting 6 goals, and 23 assists (29 points) in 67 games.

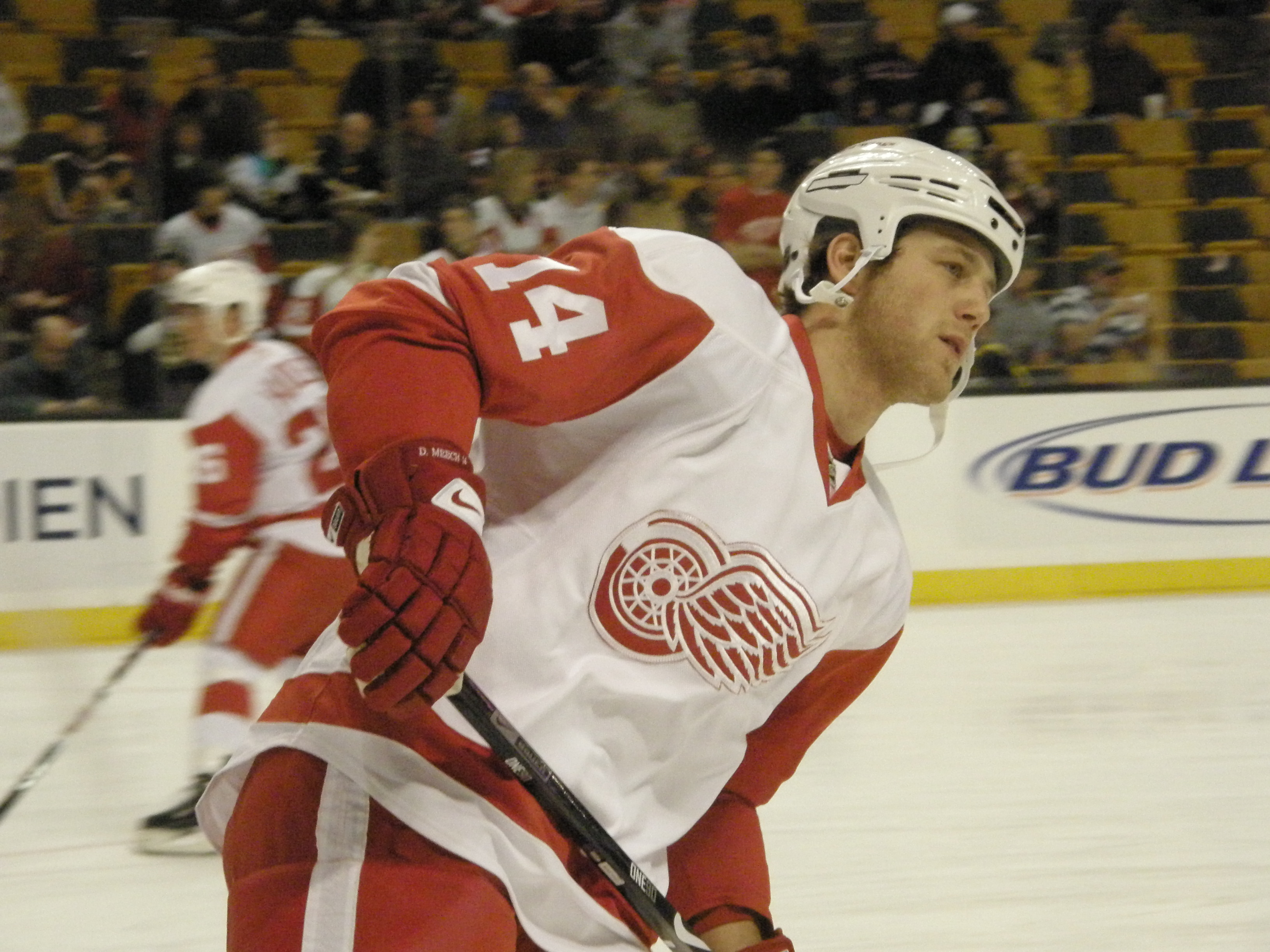
With the Red Wings in 2008.

Meech was named to the Red Wings final roster during training camp prior to the 2007–08 NHL season. He would have been exposed to waivers had he been sent to the minor leagues, which factored into the team's decision. Also working in Meech's favor for making the roster was Brent Sopel, on a tryout for the Red Wings, had spontaneously signed with the Chicago Blackhawks and Kyle Quincey broke his hand.

In 2008, Meech was named "Detroit Red Wings Rookie of the Year" by the Detroit Sports Broadcasters' Association for his play in the 2007–08 season. Based on the system the Red Wings employ, Meech was sometimes used as a left winger. His versatility in playing both forward and defenseman led to extra playing time.

Despite not playing the minimum 40 games (Meech only played 32) and not a minute in the playoffs, Meech had his name engraved on the Stanley Cup, due to a successful petition to the NHL by the Detroit Red Wings organization.

Meech scored his first career NHL goal with the Detroit Red Wings on December 4, 2008 against Curtis Sanford of the Vancouver Canucks.

On September 8, 2010, Meech was placed on waivers by the Red Wings. Unclaimed, Meech was assigned to the Griffins for the duration of the 2010–11 season.

Meech signed a two-way contract with the Winnipeg Jets on July 1, 2011. Meech played in only 2 games with the Jets during the 2011–12 season, in a season largely marred by injury. He signed a one-year, two-way contract with the Winnipeg Jets, on July 1, 2012.

On July 14, 2013, Meech signed his first contract with a European team as a free agent on a one-year contract with HC Dinamo Minsk of the Kontinental Hockey League. In the 2013–14 season, Meech played in 23 games with Dinamo Minsk, posting 5 assists, before he was mutually released from his contract. He returned to North America and on January 6, 2014, he signed for the remainder of the season to add a veteran presence with the Texas Stars of the AHL.

After two seasons with the Stars, Meech embarked on a European return in signing a two-year contract with Swedish club, Malmö Redhawks on May 6, 2015. In the 2015–16 season, Meech added a veteran presence to the Blueline, contributing with 12 points in 37 games before he was sidelined due to injury. Unable to return to full physical health in the off-season, Meech and Malmö opted to end his contract early in order to continue his rehabilitation on July 22, 2016.

== Career statistics ==
=== Regular season and playoffs ===
			Regular season					Playoffs
Season	Team	League	GP	G	A	Pts	PIM	GP	G	A	Pts	PIM
1999–2000	Red Deer Rebels	WHL	5	1	0	1	2	—	—	—	—	—
2000–01	Red Deer Rebels	WHL	60	2	7	9	40	22	0	0	0	9
2001–02	Red Deer Rebels	WHL	71	8	19	27	33	13	1	1	2	6
2002–03	Red Deer Rebels	WHL	65	6	16	22	53	23	1	5	6	20
2003–04	Red Deer Rebels	WHL	62	10	28	38	40	19	4	7	11	10
2004–05	Grand Rapids Griffins	AHL	78	6	8	14	40	—	—	—	—	—
2005–06	Grand Rapids Griffins	AHL	79	4	16	20	85	16	0	2	2	4
2006–07	Grand Rapids Griffins	AHL	67	6	23	29	40	7	0	1	1	4
2006–07	Detroit Red Wings	NHL	4	0	0	0	2	—	—	—	—	—
2007–08	Grand Rapids Griffins	AHL	6	1	1	2	0	—	—	—	—	—
2007–08	Detroit Red Wings	NHL	32	0	3	3	6	—	—	—	—	—
2008–09	Detroit Red Wings	NHL	41	2	5	7	12	2	0	0	0	0
2009–10	Detroit Red Wings	NHL	49	2	4	6	19	—	—	—	—	—
2010–11	Grand Rapids Griffins	AHL	74	10	27	37	81	—	—	—	—	—
2011–12	Winnipeg Jets	NHL	2	0	0	0	4	—	—	—	—	—
2011–12	St. John's IceCaps	AHL	6	0	2	2	0	15	4	5	9	2
2012–13	St. John's IceCaps	AHL	46	3	20	23	38	—	—	—	—	—
2012–13	Winnipeg Jets	NHL	16	0	1	1	2	—	—	—	—	—
2013–14	Dinamo Minsk	KHL	23	0	5	5	14	—	—	—	—	—
2013–14	Texas Stars	AHL	36	2	15	17	22	21	3	8	11	8
2014–15	Texas Stars	AHL	63	10	25	35	32	2	0	0	0	4
2015–16	Malmö Redhawks	SHL	37	3	9	12	14	—	—	—	—	—
AHL totals			455	42	137	179	338	61	6	17	23	22
NHL totals			144	4	13	17	45	2	0	0	0	0

=== International ===
Year	Team	Event	GP	G	A	Pts	PIM
2001	Canada Western	U17	4	1	1	2	0
2001	Canada	U18	5	1	1	2	2
2004	Canada	WJC	6	0	1	1	2
Junior totals			15	2	3	5	4

== Awards and honours ==
Awards	Year
WHL
East Second All-Star Team	2004
