= Barclay Goodrow =

Canadian ice hockey player (born 1993)

- Goodrow with the San Jose Sharks in 2026
- Born: February 26, 1993 (age 33) Toronto, Ontario, Canada
- Height: 6 ft 2 in (188 cm)
- Weight: 210 lb (95 kg; 15 st 0 lb)
- Position: Forward
- Shoots: Left
- NHL team Former teams: San Jose Sharks; Tampa Bay Lightning; New York Rangers
- NHL draft: Undrafted
- Playing career: 2014–present

Barclay Goodrow (born February 26, 1993) is a Canadian professional ice hockey player who is a forward and alternate captain for the San Jose Sharks of the National Hockey League (NHL).

Goodrow played his junior hockey over five seasons with the Brampton Battalion of the Ontario Hockey League, serving as captain in both the final season in Brampton and the first in North Bay. Although he remained undrafted throughout his years of eligibility, Goodrow was invited to attend the San Jose Sharks' Development Camp and subsequently signed with them. During his tenure with the Sharks, he played with their American Hockey League affiliate, the San Jose Barracuda, and helped them win their first series during the 2017 Calder Cup playoffs.

During the 2019–20 season, Goodrow was traded to the Tampa Bay Lightning whom he helped win back-to-back Stanley Cups in 2020 and 2021. On July 17, 2021, with Goodrow approaching free agency, his signing rights were traded by Tampa Bay to the New York Rangers in exchange for a seventh-round pick in the 2022 NHL entry draft. Goodrow was subsequently waived by the Rangers following the 2023–24 season, and was re-claimed by the Sharks.

== Early life ==
Goodrow was born on February 26, 1993, in Toronto, Ontario, Canada to parents John and Janice. He was born into an athletic family as his father played football for three years at the University of Toronto and his sister played rugby at the University of Western Ontario. Growing up in Aurora, Barclay started playing ice hockey at the age of five before progressing to tyke and playing two years with Aurora Tigers AA teams. When he was 10, he began playing AAA minor ice hockey in Richmond Hill and with the York Simcoe Express, where he helped his teams win three Ontario Minor Hockey Association (OMHA) championships in five years. At the age of 15 with the York Simcoe Express, Goodrow finished second in OMHA/Eastern AAA Hockey League scoring with 67 goals and 47 assists for 114 points in 71 games.

== Playing career ==
=== Junior ===
As a result of his play at the junior level, Goodrow was a first-round pick of the Brampton Battalion in the 2009 Ontario Hockey League (OHL) Priority Selection. He joined the Battalion for their 2009–10 preseason games where he led them with five goals and one assist for six points in five games. In his OHL debut game against the Peterborough Petes, Goodrow played on the right wing and recorded an assist. He eventually cemented himself into a right wing role alongside Sam Carrick and Sean Jones while veterans Cody Hodgson and Matt Duchene attended National Hockey League (NHL) training camps. Goodrow later scored his first career OHL goal at 5:18 of the second period to give the Battalion a 5–0 lead. Beyond scoring, he also accumulated penalty minutes including 15 in 10 games. After tallying four goals and three assists for seven points through 22 games, Goodrow was chosen to represent Team Canada at the World U-17 Hockey Challenge. Prior to leaving, he broke a 12-game scoring drought by scoring his fifth goal of the season in a 5–2 win over the Guelph Storm. Goodrow subsequently missed three OHL games while playing at the 10-team World U-17 Hockey Challenge and returned with a silver medal. Upon returning to the lineup, Goodrow stepped up into a major role with the Battalion as a replacement for an injured Cody Hodgson.

Upon concluding his rookie season, Goodrow rejoined the Battalion for the 2010–11 season. In the first year of his NHL draft eligibility, Goodrow earned a mid-term ranking of 173rd amongst North American skaters eligible for the 2011 NHL entry draft. At the time of this ranking, Goodrow was fourth in team scoring with 14 goals and 10 assists for 24 points through 39 games. He continued to produce offensively as the season continued which earned him a higher final ranking of 116th by the NHL Central Scouting Bureau. During the offseason prior to the 2011–12 season, Goodrow and teammates Philip Lane and Ian Watters spent time in the gym and working with a skating coach on strength and conditioning.

Despite remaining undrafted, Goodrow was invited to participate in the Carolina Hurricanes Rookie Camp. However, while participating in their rookie camp, he suffered a leg injury and was forced to miss four OHL games. During the Battalion's first preseason game, Goodrow was named team captain for the game, while Mitchell Porowski, Alex O’Neil, and Ian Watters served as alternates. It was later announced that Carric would serve at the Battalion's captain with Goodrow as one of the alternates. At the age of 18, Goodrow was the youngest member of the leadership group. By November, Goodrow was tied for third place in Battalion scoring with a team-leading 12 goals and four assists for 16 points through 22 games. At the same time, he also maintained a 13 game point streak of nine goals and four assists. Goodrow maintained his career-best season and in March ranked second in Battalion scoring with 25 goals and 22 assists for 47 points. He also tied with Jason Maleyko for 24th place on the club’s all-time points list. Goodrow's efforts were recognized at the conclusion of the season when he received the Battalion's most sportsmanlike player award. At the conclusion of the 2011–12 season, Goodrow was invited to attend the Los Angeles Kings' 2012 development camp.

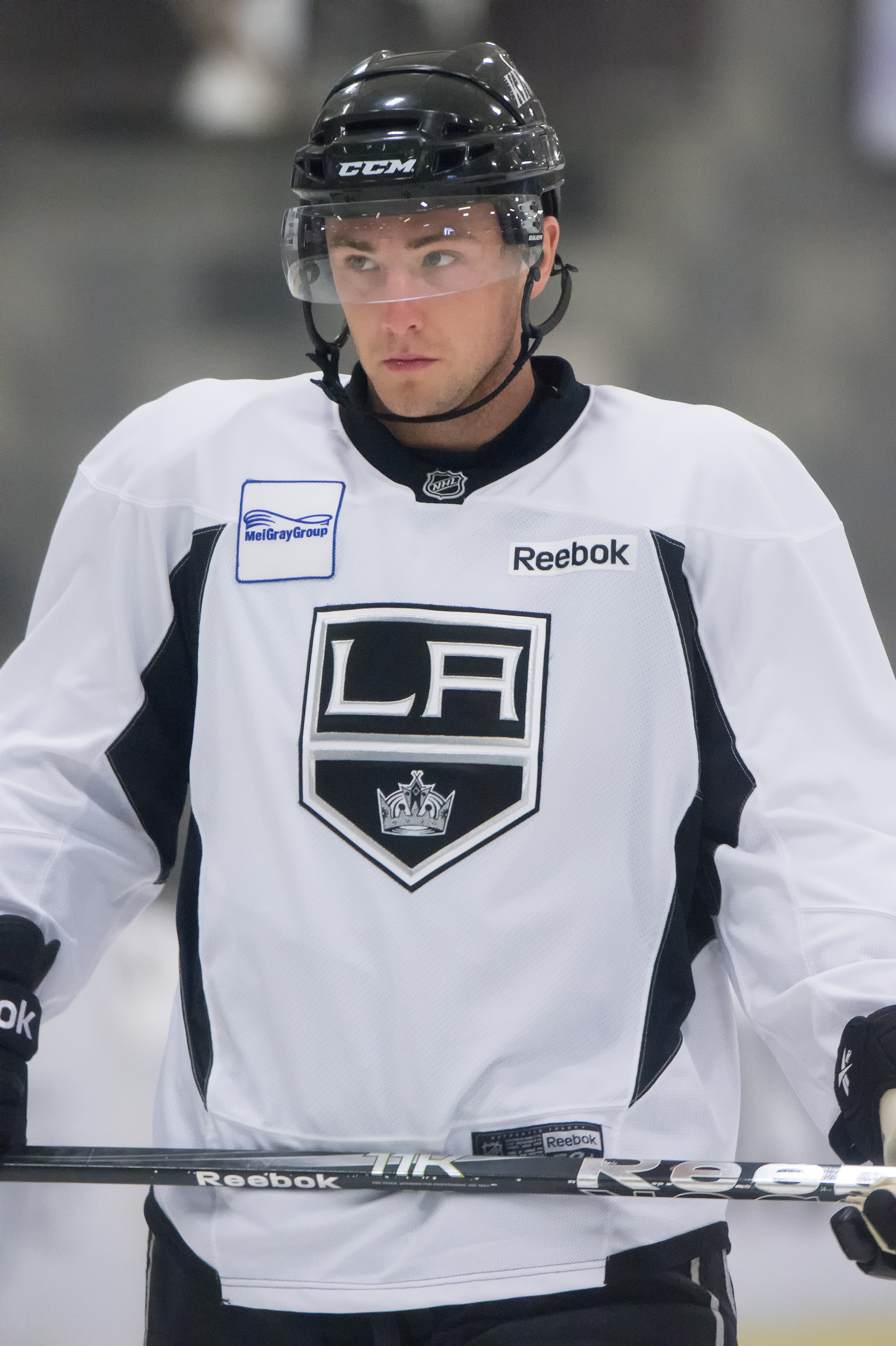
Goodrow during the 2012 Los Angeles Kings development camp.

Upon returning from his first NHL development camp, Goodrow was named the 12th captain in the Battalion’s 15-year history. At the time of the announcement, Goodrow has also led the team in scoring with five goals and two assists for seven points through nine games. He was later named one of 34 players selected to the rosters for the CHL Canada/Russia Series. During the series, he played alongside Sean Monahan and Connor McDavid but was criticized for his skating ability. ESPN reporter Grant Sonier stated: "It was really evident when he played on that line at a really high pace – the Russians were a really good team – and (his skating) was the issue. He didn't get a whole lot of playing time as the game wore on." Despite this, Goodrow finished in a tie for third place as best defensive forward as voted by OHL Eastern Conference coaches. Goodrow finished the season with 38 goals and 14 assists through 62 games but was bypassed in all seven rounds of the 2013 NHL entry draft. However, he was invited to participate in the Detroit Red Wings Rookie Camp.

Goodrow returned from the Detroit Red Wings camp the day before the 2013–14 season and began his second campaign as the Battalion's team captain. On September 22, Goodrow played in his 253rd OHL game to tie Wojtek Wolski and John de Gray for fifth place on the franchise’s all-time list. Prior to his 21st birthday, Goodrow led the team in scoring with 25 goals and 23 assists for 48 points through 49 games. With his assistance, the Battalion qualified for OHL playoffs after they captured the Central Division title. At the conclusion of his final major junior season, Goodrow was nominated for the Red Tilson Trophy and for the Leo Lalonde Memorial Trophy as the league's top overage player. As a result of his play, Goodrow signed an entry-level contract with the San Jose Sharks on March 6, 2014.

=== Professional (2014–present) ===
==== San Jose Sharks ====
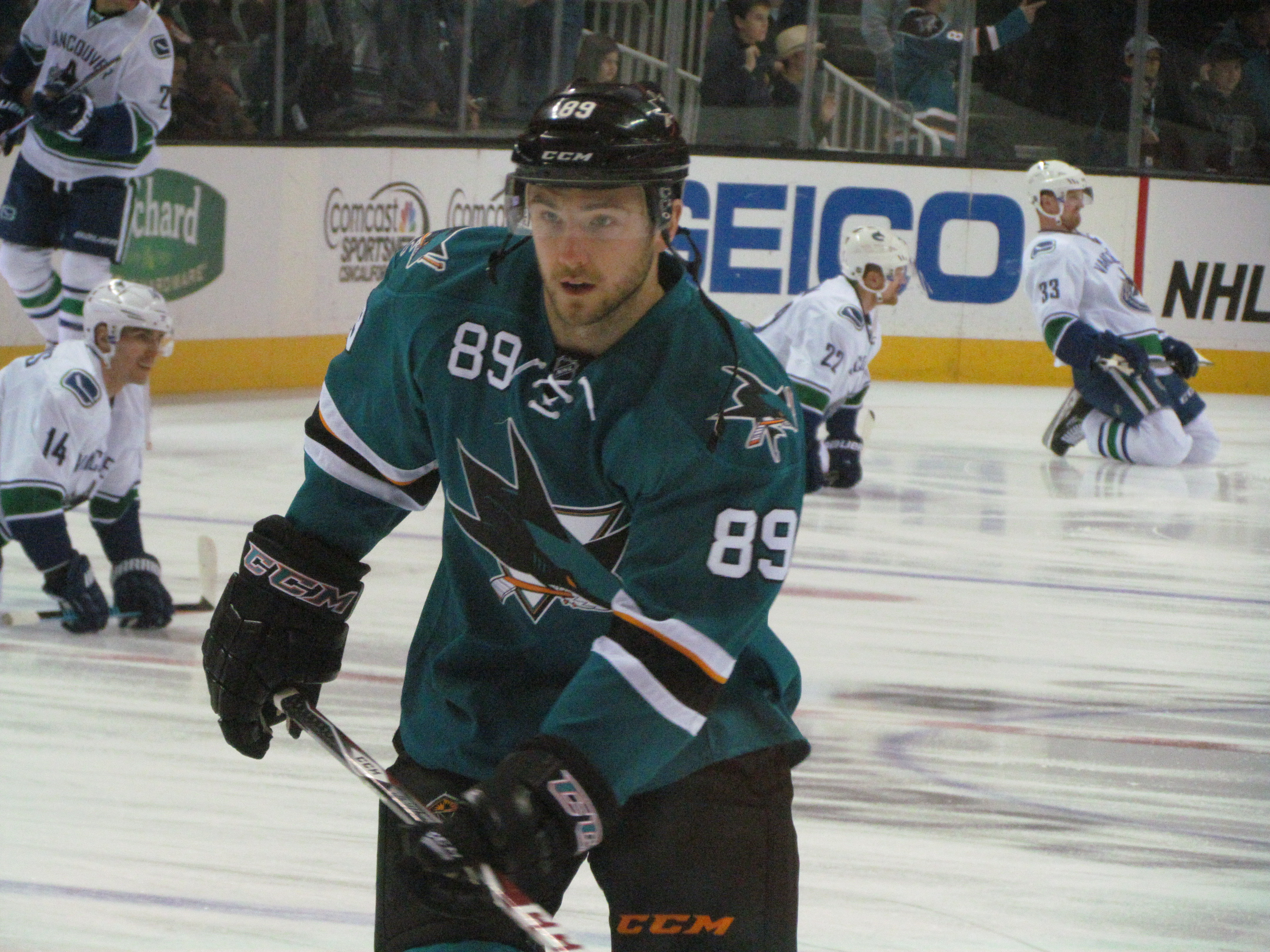
Goodrow with the San Jose Sharks in December 2014.

Following the signing, Goodrow was invited to attend the Sharks' 2014 Development Camp and training camp. After scoring two goals in an exhibition game against the Anaheim Ducks, Goodrow suffered a hand injury in the Sharks final game which delayed his NHL season debut for 11 games. He eventually made his debut on October 30, 2014, in a 4–3 shootout loss to the Minnesota Wild. Goodrow then tallied his first career assist on November 16 in a 2–0 win over the Carolina Hurricanes. On December 9, 2014, Goodrow scored his first career NHL goal in a 5–2 victory over the Edmonton Oilers. The goal came 54 seconds after Joe Pavelski's goal to lead the Sharks 2–0. After tallying two goals and five assists through 31 games with the Sharks, Goodrow was re-assigned to their American Hockey League (AHL) affiliate, the Worcester Sharks. He played two games in the AHL, accumulating nine penalty minutes, before being recalled to the NHL level on January 27, 2015. Goodrow finished his first professional season playing in 60 games with the Sharks and tallying four goals and eight assists.

Following his rookie season, Goodrow was re-assigned to the Sharks' new AHL affiliate, the San Jose Barracuda, to begin the 2015–16 season. He rejoined the Sharks at the NHL level for 12 games in November but was re-assigned to the AHL after going goalless and tallying three assists. Upon returning to the AHL, Goodrow struggled with his confidence and was placed on the Barracuda's fourth line. After being placed on the line, he picked up in scoring and was named CCM/AHL Player of the Week for the week ending on December 6, 2015, following a hat-trick against the Bakersfield Condors. By January, he led the team in scoring with 13 goals and was subsequently selected for the 2016 AHL All-Star Game. Goodrow finished his second professional season by setting a franchise and career record with 25 goals. He also finished the regular season fourth on the team in points and tied for third in power play goals. As a result of his improvements, Goodrow re-joined the Sharks for their 2016 Stanley Cup playoffs push against the St. Louis Blues and Pittsburgh Penguins.

After Goodrow spent the majority of the 2015–16 season with the Barracuda, the same occurred during the 2016–17 season. He was again invited to participate in the Sharks' training camp and exhibition games, where he played alongside Tommy Wingels and Melker Karlsson, but was re-assigned to the AHL. In 61 games with the Barracuda, Goodrow recorded a team-high 25 goals and 20 assists. During the 2017 Calder Cup playoffs, Goodrow helped lead the team to their first series win in team history. His versatile play over his two full seasons with the Barracuda was recognized by head coach Roy Sommer who said: "Barclay’s turned into an all-around player for us. He kills penalties, he’s on the power play, he’s on our top line, he’s played both wings and even taken draws on his strong side." On August 7, 2017, the Sharks re-signed Goodrow to a two-year contract.

In the first year of his new contract, Goodrow rejoined the Sharks for the entirety of the 2017–18 season. In his second game with the team, he centered a line for the first time since he was in minor hockey as he helped lead the Sharks to their fourth consecutive win. However, on November 16, Goodrow was injured in a 2–0 loss against the Florida Panthers and was subsequently placed on injured reserve. He was eventually activated off injured reserve on December 2 but returned again shortly thereafter. Goodrow sustained another upper-body injury in the first period of a loss to the St. Louis Blues on March 27. He finished the regular season with seven goals and seven assists in 47 games.

Prior to the start of the 2018–19 season, the Sharks signed Goodrow to a two-year contract extension through the 2020–21 season. Early in the season, he skated on the Sharks' third line alongside Joe Thornton and Marcus Sörensen. On March 25, 2019, Goodrow played in his 200th career NHL game during a loss to the Red Wings. As the Sharks qualified for the 2019 Stanley Cup playoffs, Goodrow was tasked with centering their fourth line with Lukas Radil and Melker Karlsson. During game seven of the Sharks' first-round matchup against the Vegas Golden Knights, Goodrow scored the series-winning goal in overtime to lead them to the second round.

==== Tampa Bay Lightning ====
On February 24, 2020, Goodrow and a 2020 third-round pick were traded to the Tampa Bay Lightning in exchange for Anthony Greco and a 2020 first-round pick. At the time of the trade, he had collected a career-best eight goals and 24 points through 62 games along with 80 penalty minutes. Upon joining the team, Goodrow skated on the right wing on Tampa Bay's third line alongside Ondrej Palat and Tyler Johnson. He recorded an assist in his debut the following night during a 4–3 loss to the Toronto Maple Leafs. Goodrow played eight games with the Lightning, tallying two assists, before the season was placed on hold due to the COVID-19 pandemic. Once the NHL returned to play, Goodrow helped the Lightning defeat the Washington Capitals in the first round-robin game. He later scored his first goal with the team 16 seconds into the second period to help lead the Lightning to a 2–1 victory over the Columbus Blue Jackets in game four. Goodrow eventually helped the Lightning win their first Stanley Cup since 2004 in game six against the Dallas Stars. However, as a result of the pandemic, Goodrow was unable to get his day with the Cup.

Goodrow returned to the Lightning for their 2020–21 NHL season. In early February, Goodrow was named the NHL's Player of the Week after he recorded a team-high four points as the Lightning held a perfect 3–0–0 record. However, he then experienced a goalless drought and did not score again until April 8. In the Lightnings final game of the regular season, it was announced that Goodrow was recovering from an upper body injury with no returning timeline. Goodrow eventually returned to the Lightning's lineup for game six against the Florida Panthers and logging three shots on goal and five hits in 16:43 minutes of ice time. In their following series against the Carolina Hurricanes, Goodrow scored the game winning goal to lead the Lightning 2–1 in game one. During the same game, he also recorded seven hits in 18:48 of ice time, which included 5:40 on the penalty kill. Throughout the remainder of the series, Goodrow played on the Lightning's third line alongside Blake Coleman and Yanni Gourde. With his assistance, the Lightning returned to the Stanley Cup Final where they faced off against the Montreal Canadiens. In game two of the Final, Goodrow assisted on Coleman's game winning goal with 1.1 seconds left in the second period. They eventually beat the Canadiens in five games to win back-to-back Stanley Cups, with Goodrow being named First Star of the game. He was also named Sport Aurora's athlete of the Year.

==== New York Rangers ====
On July 17, 2021, with Goodrow approaching free agency, his signing rights were traded by Tampa Bay to the New York Rangers in exchange for a 2022 seventh-round pick. Upon joining the team, Rangers GM Chris Drury praised his ability to be versatile, saying: "I could see him do all different things for Gerard, whether that's more time in the middle, whether it's face-offs in the [defensive] zone. But we think he's got a pretty complete game. He's going be able to help a lot of different areas." After contract discussions, Goodrow signed a six-year deal with the Rangers on July 22, 2021. Prior to the start of the 2021–22 season, Goodrow was one of six players named an alternate captain for the Rangers. While he began the season on the Ranger's third and fourth lines, injuries to Sammy Blais and Kaapo Kakko saw Goodrow spending more time on the Rangers top lines. When centring the fourth line, he often played between Ryan Reaves and Kevin Rooney. By December, Goodrow had tallied his seventh assist of the season, ranking sixth on the Rangers. His success continued into January as he entered the month with a three-game point streak and four points over seven games. As a result of COVID-19 affecting the Rangers lineup, Goodrow was moved from the fourth line to the second line wing position in early January. On January 24, Goodrow scored his 40th career NHL goal to help the Rangers beat the Los Angeles Kings. Later, Goodrow played in his 400th career game on April 7, against the Pittsburgh Penguins. At the conclusion of his first season with the Rangers, Goodrow set new career highs with 13 goals and 20 assists for 33 points. He was also named the Rangers co-recipient of the Players' Player Award with Jacob Trouba. Goodrow played game one of the 2022 Stanley Cup playoffs before missing 11 games with a suspected ankle fracture. He returned to help the Rangers stave off elimination in game six against the Hurricanes.

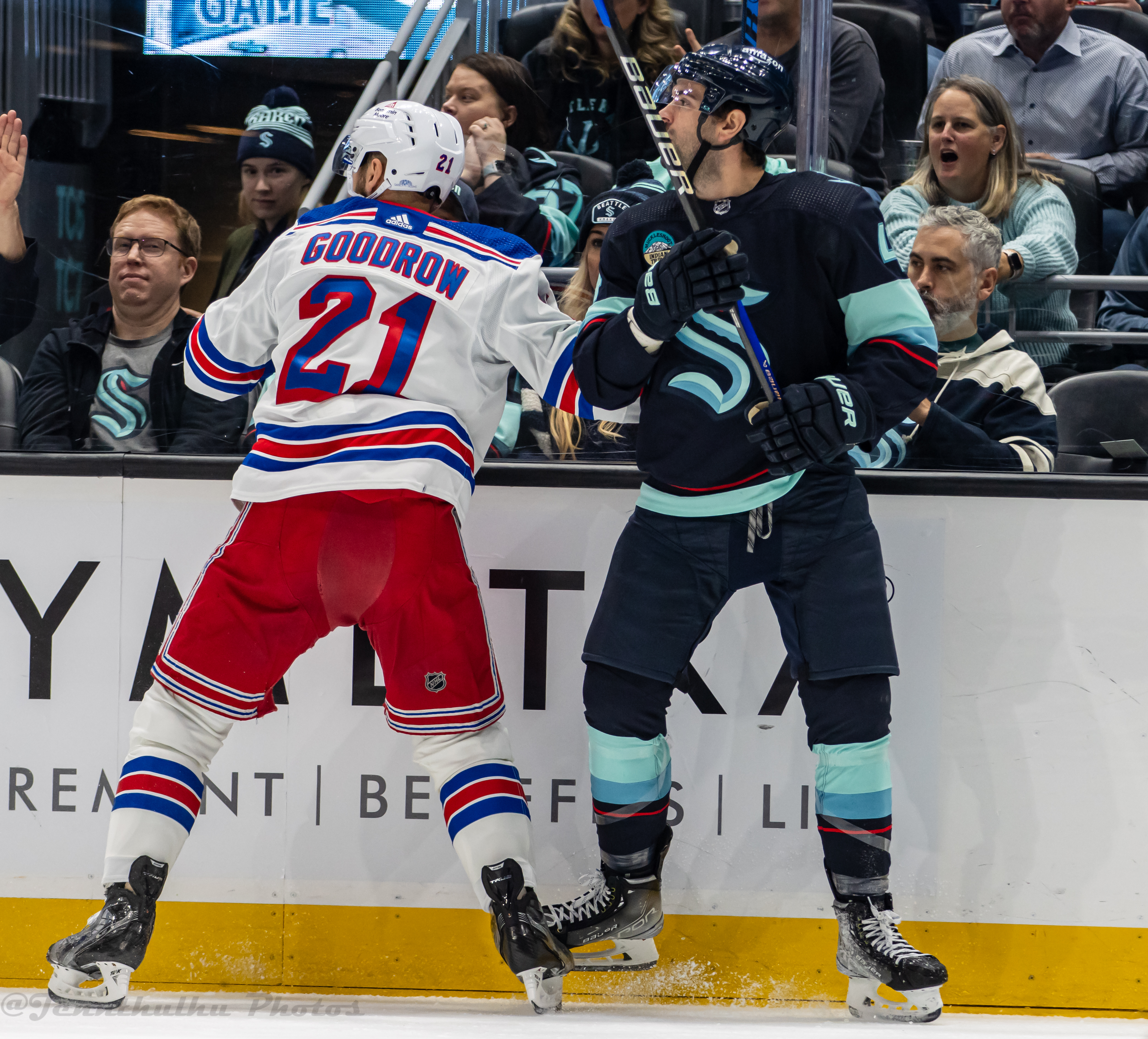
Goodrow (left) with the New York Rangers in October 2023.

Due to injuries to the Rangers lineup, Goodrow began the 2022–23 season alternating between fourth-line center and third-line winger. He played one game as the Ranger's fourth-line centre between Reaves and Dryden Hunt but spent five games on the left wing of Filip Chytil. Following an injury to Chytil in late October, Goodrow reassumed the centre position on the Ranger's third line. Through December, Goodrow continued to move up and down the lineup while playing on both his left and right side. When asked of these constant changes, Goodrow said, "My job is to go play...It doesn’t matter who I’m with. I just go out and play." By the end of the month, Goodrow led all Rangers players with eight goals at full strength and ranked third on the team with 15 points at full strength. Near the end of the season, Goodrow gained Jimmy Vesey and Tyler Motte as his linemates and the trio combined for four goals over their first 12 games together. He finished the 2022–23 season with 11 goals but tied his career-high with 20 assists for 31 points through 82 games.

On October 28, 2023, Goodrow played in his 500th career NHL game against the Vancouver Canucks. He became the 49th NHL player to have reached 500 games while going undrafted and winning two Stanley Cups.

==== Return to San Jose ====
Entering the 2024 offseason unable to meet expectations the past several years from his high-value contract relative to his performance, the Rangers looked to move Goodrow but had difficulty given his high salary and 15 team no trade list. On June 18, 2024, the Rangers placed Goodrow on waivers. He was subsequently claimed by the Sharks the following day, returning to his original team. Goodrow was reportedly unhappy with the move, as he was not approached by the Rangers management to help facilitate a trade and had placed San Jose on his no-trade list. The way in which Rangers' management had handled the Goodrow situation was not well received by New York players and reportedly affected the team's play during the following 2024–25 season, particularly after Rangers captain Jacob Trouba received a similar waivers threat.

On October 8, 2025, Goodrow was named an alternate captain for home games for the 2025–26 season. On January 27, 2026, he played in his 700th NHL game. That season, he was one of only four players on the Sharks roster, and one of only two forwards, to play all 82 games.

On September 30, 2026, Goodrow was once again named an alternate captain for home games for the 2026–27 season.

== Personal life ==
During the COVID-19 pandemic, Goodrow and his girlfriend adopted two dogs from the Humane Society of Tampa. He and teammates Scott Wedgewood and Carter Verhaeghe competed in a league-wide Fortnite tournament for charity.

== Career statistics ==
=== Regular season and playoffs ===
			Regular season					Playoffs
Season	Team	League	GP	G	A	Pts	PIM	GP	G	A	Pts	PIM
2008–09	York Simcoe Express U16 AAA	ETHL	71	67	47	114	65	—	—	—	—	—
2008–09	Villanova Knights	OJHL	2	2	1	3	2	—	—	—	—	—
2009–10	Brampton Battalion	OHL	63	6	13	19	34	11	1	3	4	2
2010–11	Brampton Battalion	OHL	65	24	15	39	36	4	0	0	0	2
2011–12	Brampton Battalion	OHL	60	26	26	52	58	8	1	1	2	6
2012–13	Brampton Battalion	OHL	62	38	14	52	59	5	2	3	5	6
2013–14	North Bay Battalion	OHL	63	33	34	67	64	22	14	10	24	23
2014–15	San Jose Sharks	NHL	60	4	8	12	35	—	—	—	—	—
2014–15	Worcester Sharks	AHL	7	2	4	6	11	4	0	1	1	4
2015–16	San Jose Sharks	NHL	14	0	3	3	16	—	—	—	—	—
2015–16	San Jose Barracuda	AHL	57	20	19	39	43	4	0	1	1	0
2016–17	San Jose Barracuda	AHL	61	25	20	45	55	15	5	5	10	10
2016–17	San Jose Sharks	NHL	3	0	1	1	0	—	—	—	—	—
2017–18	San Jose Sharks	NHL	47	7	7	14	28	2	0	0	0	0
2018–19	San Jose Sharks	NHL	82	7	10	17	76	20	2	0	2	22
2019–20	San Jose Sharks	NHL	62	8	16	24	80	—	—	—	—	—
2019–20	Tampa Bay Lightning	NHL	8	0	2	2	17	25	1	5	6	16
2020–21	Tampa Bay Lightning	NHL	55	6	14	20	52	18	2	4	6	26
2021–22	New York Rangers	NHL	79	13	20	33	69	9	0	1	1	6
2022–23	New York Rangers	NHL	82	11	20	31	58	7	1	0	1	29
2023–24	New York Rangers	NHL	80	4	8	12	78	16	6	2	8	12
2024–25	San Jose Sharks	NHL	77	5	3	8	75	—	—	—	—	—
2025–26	San Jose Sharks	NHL	82	5	7	12	73	—	—	—	—	—
NHL totals			731	70	119	189	657	97	12	12	24	111

=== International ===
Year	Team	Event	Result	GP	G	A	Pts	PIM
2010	Canada Ontario	U17	2nd place, silver medalist(s)	6	2	2	4	4
Junior totals				6	2	2	4	4

== Awards and honours ==
Award	Year	Ref
AHL
All-Star Game	2016	
NHL
Stanley Cup champion	2020, 2021	
