= Brampton Battalion =

Canadian junior ice hockey team

- City: Brampton, Ontario
- League: Ontario Hockey League
- Founded: December 3, 1996
- Operated: 1998–2013
- Home arena: Powerade Centre
- Colours: Olive, yellow, black and white

Franchise history
- 1998–2013: Brampton Battalion
- 2013–present: North Bay Battalion

The Brampton Battalion were a junior ice hockey team in the Ontario Hockey League. The team was based in Brampton, Ontario, Canada and started playing in 1998. As a result of consistently having among the lowest attendance in the OHL (last place in the OHL for its final four seasons), the team was relocated to North Bay, Ontario for the 2013–14 OHL season.

== History ==
The Brampton Battalion was granted an expansion franchise on December 3, 1996. Major Junior A hockey returned to Brampton for the first time since 1963, when the Brampton 7Ups played in the Metro Junior A League before returning to the Junior B level. Brampton was part of the return of major junior hockey to the Greater Toronto Area in the late 1990s that included the Mississauga IceDogs and the revived Toronto St. Michael's Majors.

In 2005, team owner Scott Abbott was inducted into the Brampton Sports Hall of Fame for his work in building the franchise.

The Battalion name was chosen from community suggestions, and was also adopted by the competitive minor hockey program. The team was covered by local television Rogers Community Cable 10 and the local newspaper, The Brampton Guardian. The Battalion's secondary school educational programs were co-ordinated through Turner Fenton Secondary School.

=== Early days in the West ===
The Battalion began play for the 1998–99 OHL season in the Midwest Division of the Western Conference. The Battalion played their first game on September 24, 1998, losing to the host Peterborough Petes by a 5–1 score. Jason Maleyko scored the first goal in club history. The Battalion played their first game at the Powerade Centre on October 9, 1998, losing to the Kitchener Rangers by a score of 5–1. The first win in club history would come on October 18 when the Battalion beat the visiting Sudbury Wolves 5–4. The Battalion finished the season with only 8 wins, 57 losses, and 3 ties for last in the Western Conference and 19th in the league ahead of only the Mississauga Ice Dogs.

The 1999–2000 season was better for the Battalion as they finished with a 25–29–14 record for a 3rd-place finish in the Midwest Division and 7th in the Western Conference which gave them their first trip to the post season. The Battalion won their first ever playoff game vs. the Erie Otters with a 5–2 score. However, the 2nd place Otters took the series in 6 games.

The 2000–01 season was the first season in club history that the team would score a record above the .500 mark with a final tally of 33–22–13 for a 3rd-place finish in the Midwest Division and 5th in the Western Conference. The Battalion would take on the 4th place Guelph Storm in the first round of the playoffs and won the series by sweeping the Storm in 4 games for the first playoff series win in club history. In round 2 for the second straight year the Troops took on the 1st place Erie Otters. After the Troops took game 1 the Otters would win four in a row and win the series in five games.

The Battalion fell back to below the .500 mark in the 2001–02 season posting a 26–35–7 record for last in the division and conference as the team missed the playoffs for the 2nd time in 4 years.

=== Move to the Eastern Conference ===
During the 2002 off season the North Bay Centennials were bought and moved to Saginaw, Michigan to become the Spirit and thus leaving the East and West unbalanced so the Battalion were moved to the Eastern Conference and given North Bay's former spot in the Central Division. Once again the Battalion surged above the .500 mark finishing with a 34–24–10 record good enough to win their first Division Championship in franchise history beating the Toronto St. Michaels Majors by only 2 points. During the 2003 playoffs the Battalion started what would eventually become a rivalry with the Barrie Colts defeating the Colts in the first round in six games. The second round would see the top two in the division as the Battalion faced Toronto. Brampton started off the series well beating Toronto in game 1 by a 7–0 score. However Toronto eventually proved too much for Brampton as the Majors would win four straight and take the series in only 5 games.

The Battalion did not fare well during the 2003–04 regular season, as their record fell to 25–32–11. However, the record was good enough for 7th in the east and a first round matchup with a heavily favored Ottawa 67's team who had won the East Division. With their backs against the wall, the Battalion shocked many as they took the 67's to seven games, winning game 7 and the series in Ottawa and advancing to the 2nd round. For the second straight year, in round 2, the Battalion would have to face the Eastern Conference Champions, the Toronto St. Michael's Majors. This time the Majors jumped out to a 3–0 series lead. Brampton was able to win 1 game, to force a 5th, but that was as far as they would get as the Majors won the series.

During the 2004–05 season the Battalion stood tall as they became part of a huge race involving several teams to not only win the Central Division title, but the Eastern Conference Championship as well. Despite posting a 33–24–11 record, Brampton would lose the race to the Mississauga Ice Dogs and finish 3rd in the central, and 4th in the conference, setting up a first round match up with the Sudbury Wolves. The series with the Wolves was an intense one. The Wolves took the first two games, including one in overtime. However, Brampton clawed their way back, but by game 6 in Sudbury, the Battalion were on the brink of elimination. The game went to double overtime with the Wolves scoring a power play goal to end Brampton's season.

=== Curse vs. the Colts ===
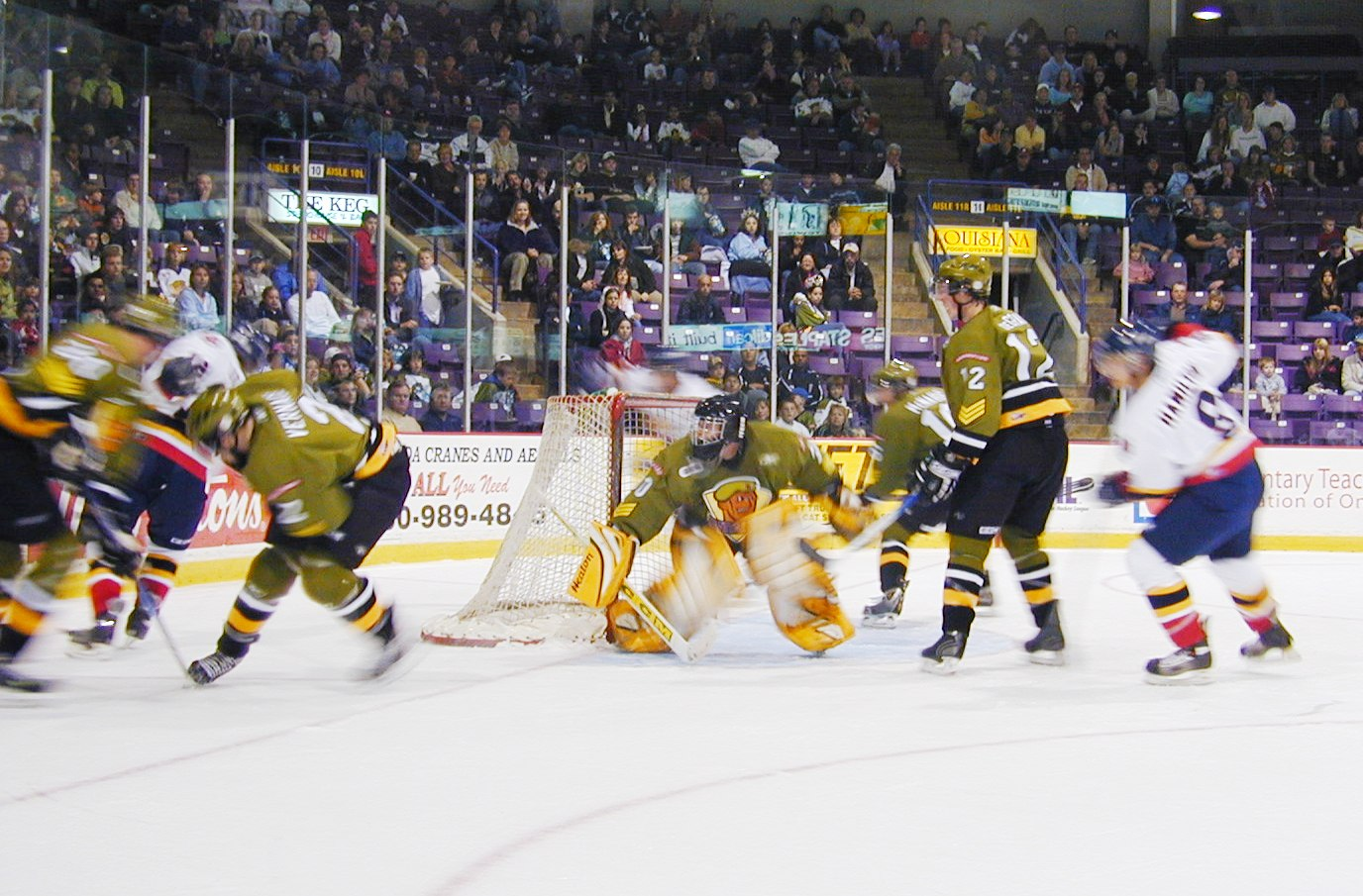
The Battalion hosting the Barrie Colts at the Powerade Centre.

The 2005–06 season would become the best season in club history; however, the season did not start off that way. After a somewhat mediocre start the club by mid February had climbed to a record of 30–21–1–2. With 14 games remaining on the schedule the Battalion would have to win every single game to even have a shot at the division championship, so that is exactly what they did. The Battalion would win the last 14 games of the regular season to establish a franchise record for straight wins (a record that eventually fell during the 2008–09 season) to finish the season with a record of 44–21–1–2 and winning the Central Division Championship by only 1 single point over the Barrie Colts. In the first round of the playoffs the Battalion knocked off the Belleville Bulls in six games before having to face the Barrie Colts in round 2. Before the series started everybody expected it to be a long and great series. In the first 2 games the teams traded 4–1 wins before the flood gates opened and the Colts took control of the series. In game 3 the Colts took a dominating 6–1 win before destroying Brampton in game 4 11–2. Game 5 was much closer but the Colts still took the game 3–2 and the series in only five games and thus beginning the Battalion's Curse of the Colts.

With several key players like future NHLer Wojtek Wolski, Luch Aquino, and Daren Machesney gone the team slumped in the 2006–07 season barely making the playoffs with a 27–36–1–4 record, only good enough for the last playoff spot (8th) in the East. During the 1st round they would have to go up against the #1 Barrie Colts who still had most of their players from the previous season's series. Brampton was able to keep most games close but Barrie kept coming out on top. In game 4 on home ice the Battalion on the brink of elimination had a 4–1 lead midway through the third period and appeared to be on their way to a win before the Colts scored 3 goals in less than 7 minutes to force overtime. In OT it took the Colts only 5 minutes to score and thus end the series in 4 straight games.

The 2007–08 season saw the team celebrate their 10th season of OHL hockey and the fans saw a great team on the ice as things went much better for the Battalion, with sophomore centre Cody Hodgson, rookie forward Matt Duchene, and veteran winger John Hughes, the team posted several wins finishing with a 42–22–1–3 record, just shy of the club record of 91 points set in 05–06. During the season the Battalion had their first 10-goal game in club history as on September 23 the host Battalion beat up on the Sudbury Wolves 10–2. For the 3rd time in 6 years the team took home the Central Division Championship. In the first round the Battalion once again were set to face the Barrie Colts, who this season had lost many of their key players and had only finished 7th in the east. With Brampton heavily favored to win the series the Colts shocked as Barrie won the first two games by 2–1 and 3–2 (OT) scores. The Battalion were able to come back and win game 3 by a score of 5–1; however, the Colts would continue to stand behind the absolutely amazing goaltending of Michael Hutchinson in game 4 winning 2–1 in overtime. With Brampton on the brink of elimination on home ice in game 5 Hutchinson stood tall again as the Colts won the game 2–0 and upset the Battalion in only five games. For the 3rd straight year Brampton had been eliminated by the Barrie Colts.

In 10 full seasons of OHL hockey the Battalion have a regular season record of 297–301–52–21–9 (W-L-T-OTL-SL) in 680 games.

=== 2008–09: Run to the finals ===
After 3 straight years of being knocked out of the playoffs by the Colts the Battalion built up a roster to make a deep run in 2008/2009. Brampton got off to a slow 2–6 start but with the return of Cody Hodgson and the addition of Evgeny Grachev the Troops went on a run of 16 straight wins setting a new franchise record for straight wins. The streak was the longest that any team achieved during the 08/09 regular season. Brampton also set a record of 12 straight home wins from October to December (another franchise record). During December Battalion forwards Cody Hodgson and Evgeny Grachev represented their respective countries (Canada and Russia) at the World Junior Hockey Championships in Ottawa. Grachev helped team Russia to a Bronze medal while Hodgson set a tournament high 16 points to lead Canada to its 5th straight gold medal. After the tournament Brampton added more to their roster acquiring all star goaltender Thomas McCollum (who had also played for his home country of U.S.A. at the World Juniors), defenceman Josh Day, and forwards, Anthony Peluso, Matt Kang and Andrew Merrett. Brampton would enjoyed another long 12-game winning streak in January and February. At the end of the regular season Brampton would finish with a franchise best record of 47–19–1–1 to win the central division for the third time in four years. In the first round of the playoffs the Battalion would sweep the Peterborough Petes four straight. The second round saw the only time in franchise history the Battalion would face their Peel Region rivals in Mississauga. The Troops won the first two games before the Majors won the next two to tie the series. The Battalion however came back with another two wins, taking game six in Mississauga by a 3–2 score to advance to the conference finals for the first time in team history. In the Eastern final the Battalion would win game one on the road in Belleville before hammering the Bulls in game two by a 7–2 score. Belleville would win game three on home ice before Brampton took a 4–3 come from behind win at the Bunker in game four. Game five in Belleville became the longest game in Battalion history as with a birth to the finals on the line the Troops took the Bulls to double overtime tied 2–2 before Nick Palmieri would score at 18:44 of the second overtime to send the series back to Brampton for game six. The Troops took a 2–0 lead early in the sixth game before the Bulls stormed ahead 3–2 in the second period. The Troops then exploded in the third with five goals to win the game 7–4 to win their first ever conference championship. In the OHL Finals Brampton would go up against the regular season champion Windsor Spitfires. Windsor pounded Brampton in game one by a score of 10–1. Windsor then took a 4–1 lead early in game two before holding on for a 5–3 win. The Battalion would finally win in game three on the road beating the Spits by a 4–2 score. However Windsor answered with another victory in Brampton this time 4–1. With the series on the line in game 5 on the road the Battalion were down 1–0 for most of the game before scoring with three minutes left in the third period to send the game to overtime. However the Spits would get an early powerplay and a goal by Taylor Hall ended the Battalion's season and give the Windsor Spitfires their first OHL Championship in 21 years. They would go on to win the Memorial Cup in Rimouski. After it was all over Battalion import Evgeny Grachev was named OHL rookie of the year. Matt Duchene collected Scholastic Player of the Year honors, while Cody Hodgson named the OHL's most Sportsmanlike player and Most Outstanding Player. Hodgson then collected CHL Player Of The Year honors, the first Battalion player to ever receive the award. Finally in June Matt Duchene was chosen 3rd overall in the NHL Entry Draft by the Colorado Avalanche.

=== 2009–2013: The final years In Brampton ===
After the teams run to the OHL finals in 2008–09 the Battalion fell to mid-pack in 2009–10. Most of the offense from the previous season was gone as Sean Jones led the team in scoring with 32 goals and 49 points. Cody Hodgson missed most of the season with a back injury. He returned to play 13 games near the end of the regular season but would miss the final 5 games with a foot injury before returning for the playoffs. The Battalion would finish the season with 25 wins and 64 points, good enough for 5th place in the Eastern Conference. The team set a franchise low in goals against with only 181, but also set the franchise low for goals for with just 167. Brampton would face the Kingston Frontenacs in the first round of the playoffs. Brampton would take the first two games before Kingston would take the next two. Brampton would win game 5 in overtime in Kingston but the Fronts would force a game 7 following a victory in Brampton. The Battalion playing in just the second game 7 in franchise history would jump out to a 4–0 lead before holding on for a 5–2 victory in Kingston to advance. The Battalion would face the OHL's leading Barrie Colts in the second round. The Colts would sweep the Battalion in four straight as the Troops fell to Barrie in the playoffs for the fourth time in five years.

The Battalion would go through the 2010–11 season with a young defensive core and goaltending group. Following a lengthy losing streak in November, General Manager Stan Butler traded goaltender Jacob Riley to Sudbury and released import goaltender Dennis Saikkonen. Butler subsequently signed overage (OA) goaltender Cody St. Jacques and traded veteran defenceman Kyle Pereira and a draft pick to Guelph for rookie import goaltender Matej Machovsky. The Battalion recorded .500 winning percentage for the remainder of the season, finishing with 29 wins and 65 points to secure 6th place in the Eastern Conference. However, the team lost four consecutive games in the first round of the playoffs to the Niagara Ice Dogs. Battalion captain Stephon Thorne scored two of the team’s three goals during the series. OA forward Scott Tanski led the team in the regular-season scoring with 47 points.

Fourth year forward Sam Carrick would be named captain of the Battalion for the 2011–12 season which was a much improved season for the Troops. Led by a 37-goal season from Carrick as well as 5 shutouts from Matej Machovsky the Battalion posted 36 wins for 82 points, the fourth highest points total in team history. The Troops began the playoffs against Sudbury. Powered by hat tricks from Matt MacLeod and Philip Lane the Troops took the first two games on home ice before a dominating 6–1 win in game three. The Troops would complete the sweep with defenceman Cameron Wind's goal in double overtime of game 4. Brampton would face the number one seeded Niagara Ice Dogs in the second round. The Troops would lose game one in overtime on the road and from there they could not recover as they would lose four straight.

The Troops began the 2012–13 season naming Barclay Goodrow the 13th captain in team history. The Troops played at a slightly above .500 level for most of the season. Early in the season it was announced that the team would be relocating to North Bay, Ontario for the 2013–14 season. On January 11, 2013, defenceman Cameron Wind passed Luke Lynes for most games played in a Battalion uniform as Wind eventually finished the season with 291 career games played. On March 12, 2013, in the final week of the regular season goaltender Matej Machovsky set the franchise record for most shutouts in a career with his 9th in a 3–0 win over the host Ottawa 67's. Captain Barclay Goodrow led the team in scoring with 38 goals and 52 points while rookie Blake Clarke scored 19 goals and 51 points. The Battalion finished the season with a record of 34–25–3–6 finishing second in the Central Division and fourth in the Eastern Conference setting up a rematch of the first round from 2012 with the Sudbury Wolves.

Brampton would win game one on home ice by a 4–1 score. Sudbury took game two jumping out to an early 3–0 lead before holding on 5–4. An outburst directed towards game referee's by Battalion coach Stan Butler had him tossed from the game and he was handed a five-game suspension it would be his final time behind the Brampton bench as the Troops could not recover losing four straight. The Troops were eliminated in a 1–0 overtime loss on home ice in game 5 on March 29, 2013. Matt MacLeod scored what turned out to be the final goal in team history during the game four 5–4 OT loss the night before.

=== Relocation to North Bay ===
During the summer of 2012 rumours of the Battalion franchise relocating began to swirl as their lease agreement with the Powerade Centre was nearing an end. An attendance that was never healthy on a regular basis to begin with was declining in Brampton. Combined with an unfavorable lease in Brampton, owner Scott Abbott had no choice but to look for other options as the 2012–13 season got under way. On Monday, November 5, 2012, following a meeting with city counsel in North Bay, Ontario an agreement in principle to move the Battalion to North Bay for the 2013–14 season was agreed upon. Just nine days later fans in North Bay had already bought 2,000 season tickets as per the conditions of the agreement. The Battalion would play out of the North Bay Memorial Gardens which underwent renovations, in order to meet OHL regulations. Franchise owner Scott Abbott indicated that the team would keep the Battalion moniker in North Bay, paying homage to the strong military history the city has.

== Championships ==
During their time in Brampton the Battalion won four division titles and one conference title.

Emms Trophy Central Division Champions

- 2002–2003
- 2005–2006
- 2007–2008
- 2008–2009

Bobby Orr Trophy Eastern Conference Champions

- 2008–2009

== Coaches ==
Stan Butler was the only head coach and general manager in club history. He was appointed to the position in August 1997. He is currently the longest serving coach with the same franchise.

Butler previously coached the Oshawa Generals, Prince George Cougars, and the Canada's National Under 18 team. Stan Butler became only the 4th coach in OHL history to coach 1000 games on February 10, 2011, as his Battalion defeated the only other OHL team Butler has coached (the Oshawa Generals) by a 3–1 score. On February 26, 2012, Butler became only the 7th coach in OHL history to win 500 games after the Battalion defeated the Sault Ste Marie Greyhounds by a score of 3–1. Butler won 430 of the 500 with Brampton.

== Players ==
=== Award winners ===
- 1998 – Jay Harrison Jack Ferguson Award, First overall draft pick
- 1999–2000 – Rostislav Klesla CHL Top Draft Prospect Award
- 2005–06 – Wojtek Wolski William Hanley Trophy, Most Sportsmanlike Player
- 2005–06 – Wojtek Wolski Red Tilson Trophy, Most Outstanding Player
- 2008–09 – Evgeny Grachev Emms Family Award, Rookie of the Year
- 2008–09 – Cody Hodgson William Hanley Trophy, Most Sportsmanlike Player
- 2008–09 – Matt Duchene Bobby Smith Trophy, OHL Scholastic Player of the Year
- 2008–09 – Cody Hodgson Red Tilson Trophy, Most Outstanding Player
- 2008–09 – Cody Hodgson CHL Player Of The Year
- 2010–11 – Matej Machovsky F. W. "Dinty" Moore Trophy, Lowest 1st year Goals Against Average

=== NHL drafted players ===
Player	NHL team	Year	Draft result
Jeff Bateman	Dallas Stars	1999	4th round, 126th overall
Brad Woods	Florida Panthers	1999	6th round, 169th overall
Rostislav Klesla	Columbus Blue Jackets	2000	1st round, 4th overall
Raffi Torres	New York Islanders	2000	1st round, 5th overall
Tyler Hanchuck	Montreal Canadiens	2000	3rd round, 79th overall
Aaron Van Leusen	Detroit Red Wings	2000	4th round, 130th overall
Paul Flache	Edmonton Oilers	2000	5th round, 152nd overall
Jason Maleyko	Ottawa Senators	2000	6th round, 188th overall
Jay McClement	St. Louis Blues	2001	2nd round, 60th overall
Jay Harrison	Toronto Maple Leafs	2001	3rd round, 82nd overall
Ryan Bowness	Columbus Blue Jackets	2001	8th round, 236th overall
Adam Henrich	Tampa Bay Lightning	2002	2nd round, 57th overall
Paul Henrich	Atlanta Thrashers	2002	5th round, 144th overall
Brad Topping	New York Islanders	2002	7th round, 220th overall
Brent Burns	Minnesota Wild	2003	1st round, 20th overall
Kamil Kreps	Florida Panthers	2003	2nd round, 38th overall
Martin Lojek	Florida Panthers	2003	4th round, 105th overall
Ryan Oulahen	Detroit Red Wings	2003	5th round, 161st overall
Wojtek Wolski	Colorado Avalanche	2004	1st round, 21st overall
Michael Vernace	San Jose Sharks	2004	7th round, 201st overall
Phil Oreskovic	Toronto Maple Leafs	2005	3rd round, 82nd overall
Daren Machesney	Washington Capitals	2005	5th round, 143rd overall
Luch Aquino	New York Islanders	2005	7th round, 210th overall
John Seymour	Los Angeles Kings	2005	7th round, 226th overall
John de Gray	Anaheim Ducks	2006	3rd round, 83rd overall
Aaron Snow	Dallas Stars	2006	3rd round, 90th overall
Luke Lynes	Washington Capitals	2006	4th round, 122nd overall
Bryan Pitton	Edmonton Oilers	2006	5th round, 133rd overall
Cody Hodgson	Vancouver Canucks	2008	1st round, 10th overall
Kyle DeCoste	Tampa Bay Lightning	2008	5th round, 147th overall
Patrick Killeen	Pittsburgh Penguins	2008	6th round, 180th overall
Matt Duchene	Colorado Avalanche	2009	1st round, 3rd overall
Mat Clark	Anaheim Ducks	2009	2nd round, 37th overall
Philip Lane	Phoenix Coyotes	2010	2nd round, 52nd overall
Sam Carrick	Toronto Maple Leafs	2010	5th round, 144th overall
Dylan Blujus	Tampa Bay Lightning	2012	2nd round, 40th overall

=== NHL alumni ===
List of Battalion alumni who played in the National Hockey League (NHL):

- Brent Burns
- Sam Carrick
- Mat Clark
- Matt Duchene
- Cory Emmerton
- Barclay Goodrow
- Evgeny Grachev
- Jay Harrison
- Cody Hodgson
- Rostislav Klesla
- Kamil Kreps
- Martin Lojek
- Jay McClement
- Thomas McCollum
- Phil Oreskovic
- Nick Paul
- Anthony Peluso
- Bob Sanguinetti
- Jason Spezza
- Raffi Torres
- Michael Vernace
- Wojtek Wolski

== Season-by-season results ==
Legend: GP = Games played, W = Wins, L = Losses, T = Ties, OTL = Overtime losses, SL = Shoot-out losses, Pts = Points, GF = Goals for, GA = Goals against

Memorial Cup champions	OHL champions	OHL runners-up

Season	GP	W	L	T	OTL	SL	Pts	Win %	GF	GA	Standing	Playoffs
1998–99	68	8	57	3	—	—	19	0.140	198	362	5th Midwest	Did not qualify
1999–2000	68	25	28	11	4	—	65	0.478	213	226	3rd Midwest	Lost conference quarterfinal (Erie Otters) 4–2
2000–01	68	33	22	9	4	—	79	0.581	231	210	3rd Midwest	Won conference quarterfinal (Guelph Storm) 4–0; Lost conference semifinal (Erie Otters) 4–1
2001–02	68	26	35	5	2	—	59	0.434	215	258	5th Midwest	Did not qualify
2002–03	68	34	24	6	4	—	78	0.574	239	202	1st Central	Won conference quarterfinal (Barrie Colts) 4–2; Lost conference semifinal (Toronto St. Michael's Majors) 4–1
2003–04	68	25	32	9	2	—	61	0.449	180	221	4th Central	Won conference quarterfinal (Ottawa 67's) 4–1; Lost conference semifinal (Toronto St. Michael's Majors) 4–1
2004–05	68	33	24	9	2	—	77	0.566	214	200	3rd Central	Lost conference quarterfinal (Sudbury Wolves) 4–2
2005–06	68	44	21	—	1	2	91	0.669	272	222	1st Central	Won conference quarterfinal (Belleville Bulls) 4–2; Lost conference semifinal (Barrie Colts) 4–1
2006–07	68	27	36	—	1	4	59	0.434	214	277	4th Central	Lost conference quarterfinal (Barrie Colts) 4–0
2007–08	68	42	22	—	1	3	88	0.647	264	187	1st Central	Lost conference quarterfinal (Barrie Colts) 4–1
2008–09	68	47	19	—	1	1	96	0.706	264	184	1st Central	Won conference quarterfinal (Peterborough Petes) 4–0; Won conference semifinal (Mississauga St. Michael's Majors) 4–2; Won conference final (Belleville Bulls) 4–2; Lost OHL championship (Windsor Spitfires) 4–1
2009–10	68	25	29	—	7	7	64	0.471	167	181	3rd Central	Won conference quarterfinal (Kingston Frontenacs) 4–3; Lost conference semifinal (Barrie Colts) 4–0
2010–11	68	29	32	—	1	6	65	0.478	190	214	3rd Central	Lost conference quarterfinal (Niagara IceDogs) 4–0
2011–12	68	36	22	—	3	7	82	0.603	202	188	3rd Central	Won conference quarterfinal (Sudbury Wolves) 4–0; Lost conference semifinal (Niagara IceDogs) 4–0
2012–13	68	34	25	—	3	6	77	0.566	193	190	2nd Central	Lost conference quarterfinal (Sudbury Wolves) 4–1

== Uniforms and logos ==
Team uniforms

The Battalion's uniform is primarily an army-like shade of olive green. The shoulders feature black bars, with white outlining, this is then further outlined in black. Evenly between the shoulder and elbow lie three military-style chevrons, connoting rank (here, sergeant) completing armed forces theme. The logo featured their mascot, Sarge, gritting his teeth is also army olive green, a mix of yellow and beige, white, flesh-coloured pinky-orange, black, and red.

== Arena ==
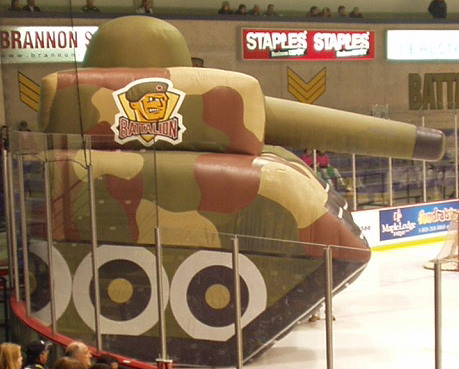
Brampton Battalion's inflatable tank, used for player introductions at home games.

The Brampton Battalion played out of the Powerade Centre, which was formerly known as the "Brampton Centre for Sports & Entertainment". It is located on Kennedy Road, on the south-side of the city near the 407 ETR. This facility has one main arena, as well as three full size practice rinks on the north-east side, many baseball diamonds as part of the complex. Also a full sized outdoor rink was added to the south side of the complex in the summer of 2008.
