= Anthony Peluso =

Canadian ice hockey player (born 1989)

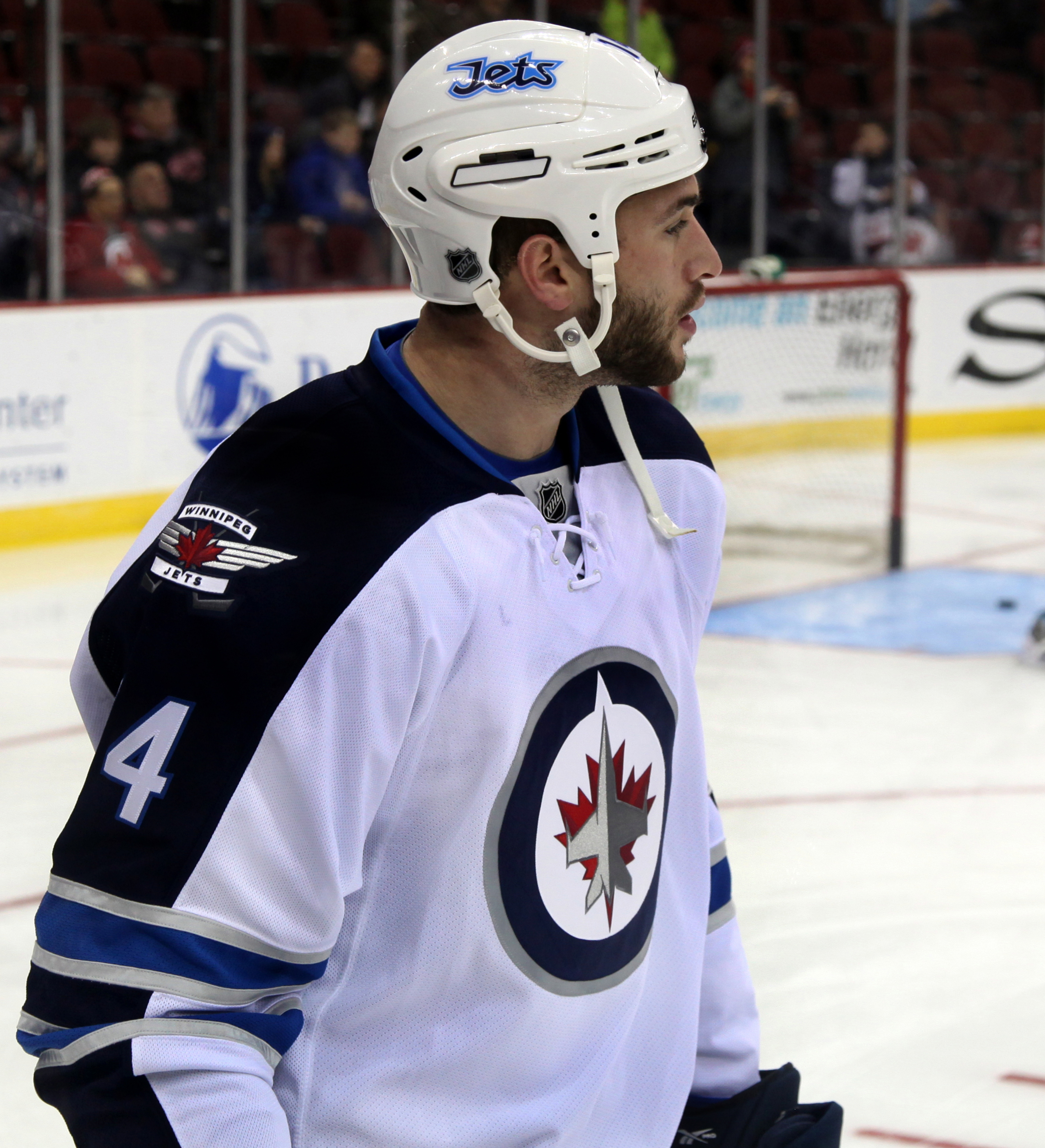
- Peluso with the Winnipeg Jets in 2013
- Born: April 18, 1989 (age 37) North York, Ontario, Canada
- Height: 6 ft 3 in (191 cm)
- Weight: 235 lb (107 kg; 16 st 11 lb)
- Position: Right wing
- Shot: Right
- Played for: Winnipeg Jets; Washington Capitals; Calgary Flames; HC Slovan Bratislava
- NHL draft: 160th overall, 2007; St. Louis Blues
- Playing career: 2009–2021

Anthony Peluso (born April 18, 1989) is a Canadian former professional ice hockey player. Peluso was selected by the St. Louis Blues in the 6th round (160th overall) of the 2007 NHL entry draft. Peluso was born in North York, Ontario.

== Playing career ==
Prior to turning professional, Peluso played major junior hockey in the Ontario Hockey League with the Erie Otters, Sault Ste. Marie Greyhounds and the Brampton Battalion. He was drafted by the Otters 10th overall in the 2005 OHL draft. In November 2007, Peluso was traded to the Sault Ste. Marie Greyhounds in exchange for Sean Jones, a 4th round pick in the 2008 OHL draft and a 3rd round pick in the 2009 OHL draft. He was traded to the Brampton Battalion in January 2009 where he ended his major junior career. On March 12, 2009, the St. Louis Blues signed Peluso to a three-year entry-level contract.

On December 15, 2013, Peluso was suspended three games for boarding Dallas Stars defenseman Alex Goligoski. Prior to the shortened 2012–13 lock-out season, Peluso was claimed off waivers from the Blues by the Winnipeg Jets on January 16, 2013. On July 22, 2013, the Jets signed Peluso who was an RFA to a two-year extension worth $1.125-million. Peluso scored his first NHL goal on October 24, 2013 against Carter Hutton of the Nashville Predators. On June 17, 2015, the Jets resigned Peluso to a two-year extension, worth $1.35 million.

After five seasons within the Jets organization, Peluso left as a free agent to sign a one-year, two-way contract with the Washington Capitals on July 1, 2017. He was sent to their AHL affiliate, the Hershey Bears, but after playing three games for them was recalled back to the NHL. He made two appearances for the Capitals, before completing the season with the Bears, registering 11 points in 38 games.

On August 21, 2018, Peluso signed a one-year, two-way contract with the Calgary Flames. He was assigned to their AHL affiliate, the Stockton Heat, prior to the 2018–19 season but was recalled to the NHL on October 6.

As a free agent from the Flames, Peluso was unable to garner an NHL contract, opting to sign a one-year AHL contract with the Bakersfield Condors, affiliate to the Edmonton Oilers, on July 17, 2019.

== Personal ==
Peluso and his wife Courtney have one son together, born in 2018.

== Career statistics ==
			Regular season					Playoffs
Season	Team	League	GP	G	A	Pts	PIM	GP	G	A	Pts	PIM
2004–05	Aurora Tigers	OPJHL	3	0	1	1	2	—	—	—	—	—
2005–06	Erie Otters	OHL	68	5	3	8	66	—	—	—	—	—
2006–07	Erie Otters	OHL	52	7	3	10	176	—	—	—	—	—
2007–08	Erie Otters	OHL	21	3	3	6	41	—	—	—	—	—
2007–08	Sault Ste. Marie Greyhounds	OHL	42	4	11	15	83	14	2	1	3	12
2008–09	Sault Ste. Marie Greyhounds	OHL	36	9	6	15	68	—	—	—	—	—
2008–09	Brampton Battalion	OHL	27	11	11	22	57	21	8	7	15	29
2009–10	Peoria Rivermen	AHL	22	1	1	2	57	—	—	—	—	—
2009–10	Bloomington PrairieThunder	IHL	2	0	1	1	12	—	—	—	—	—
2009–10	Alaska Aces	ECHL	27	4	7	11	48	4	1	0	1	6
2010–11	Peoria Rivermen	AHL	62	5	2	7	102	4	1	0	1	0
2011–12	Peoria Rivermen	AHL	61	4	5	9	159	—	—	—	—	—
2012–13	Peoria Rivermen	AHL	36	5	6	11	58	—	—	—	—	—
2012–13	Winnipeg Jets	NHL	5	0	2	2	14	—	—	—	—	—
2013–14	Winnipeg Jets	NHL	53	2	3	5	65	—	—	—	—	—
2014–15	Winnipeg Jets	NHL	49	1	1	2	86	—	—	—	—	—
2015–16	Winnipeg Jets	NHL	35	1	4	5	44	—	—	—	—	—
2016–17	Manitoba Moose	AHL	22	0	2	2	6	—	—	—	—	—
2017–18	Hershey Bears	AHL	38	7	4	11	34	—	—	—	—	—
2017–18	Washington Capitals	NHL	2	0	0	0	4	—	—	—	—	—
2018–19	Calgary Flames	NHL	4	0	0	0	7	—	—	—	—	—
2018–19	Stockton Heat	AHL	35	3	5	8	56	—	—	—	—	—
2019–20	Bakersfield Condors	AHL	37	3	5	8	30	—	—	—	—	—
2020–21	HC Slovan Bratislava	SVK	7	1	2	3	4	—	—	—	—	—
AHL totals			312	28	30	58	502	4	1	0	1	0
NHL totals			148	4	10	14	220	—	—	—	—	—
