= Phil Oreskovic =

Canadian ice hockey player (born 1987)

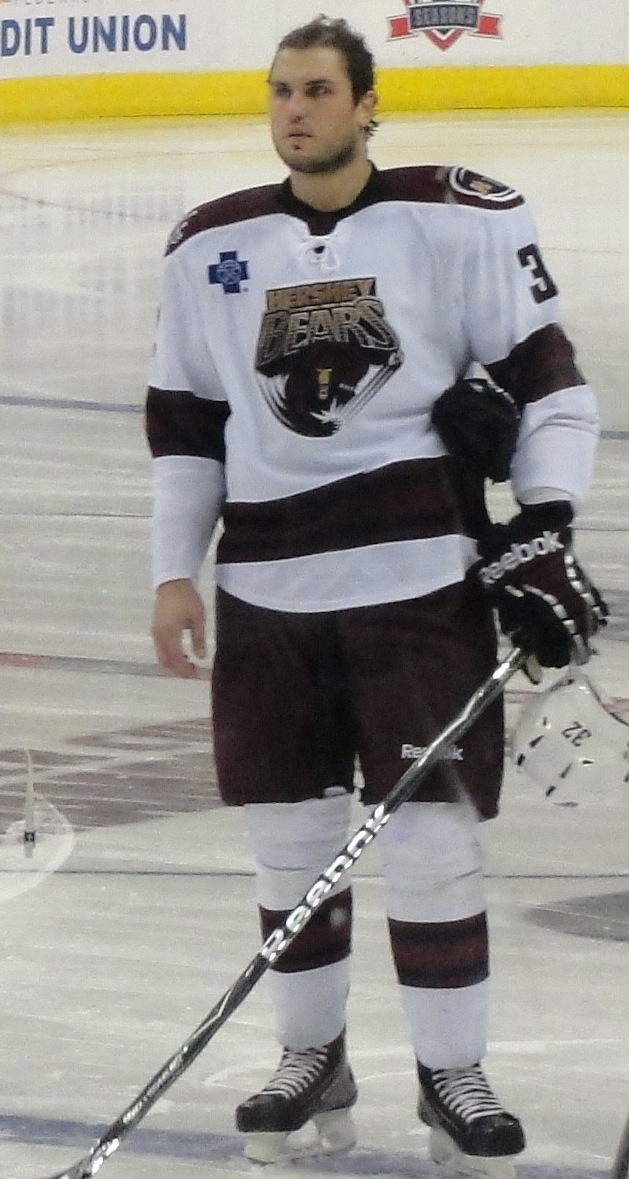
- Born: January 26, 1987 (age 39) North York, Ontario, Canada
- Height: 6 ft 3 in (191 cm)
- Weight: 217 lb (98 kg; 15 st 7 lb)
- Position: Defence
- Shot: Right
- Played for: Toronto Maple Leafs; Nottingham Panthers
- NHL draft: 82nd overall, 2005; Toronto Maple Leafs
- Playing career: 2007–2014

Phil Oreskovic (pronounced Or-esh-ko-vich; born January 26, 1987) is a Canadian former professional ice hockey defenceman.

== Playing career ==
As a youth, Oreskovic played in the 2001 Quebec International Pee-Wee Hockey Tournament with the Toronto Marlboros minor ice hockey team.

Oreskovic was drafted 82nd overall in the 2005 NHL entry draft by the Toronto Maple Leafs. Phil played in the Ontario Hockey League with the Brampton Battalion and the Owen Sound Attack before turning professional at the end of the 2006–07 season with the Toronto Marlies of the American Hockey League.

On June 1, 2007, Oreskovic was signed by the Maple Leafs to a three-year entry-level contract. He then started the 2007–08 season with Columbia Inferno of the ECHL before making his way up to the Leafs main affiliate the Marlies.

Oreskovic started the 2008–09 season with the Marlies before being recalled by the Maple Leafs on March 9, 2009. Phil made his NHL debut with the Leafs on the same day, a 3-2 loss to the Ottawa Senators, and became the 400th ECHL player to reach the NHL. On March 24, 2009, Oreskovic scored his first NHL goal against José Théodore of the Washington Capitals in a 3-2 victory.

He spent the 2009–10 season in the AHL with the Toronto Marlies playing a career-high 74 games while scoring 2 goals and getting 7 assists. In the 2010 offseason, Oreskovic was not offered a contract extension by the Toronto Maple Leafs, thus being acquired as a free agent by the Washington Capitals. He signed a professional tryout contract (PTO) in September 2010 and subsequently played for the Capitals' AHL affiliate, the Hershey Bears.

Upon joining the Bears organization, Bears forward Johann Kroll was already wearing uniform #4 and then goaltender Semyon Varlamov was already wearing uniform #40 (at the time), therefore Oreskovic chose to wear the uniform #32. Oreskovic wore the uniform #4 with the Brampton Battalion, Owen Sound Attack, Columbia Inferno and the Toronto Marlies, and wore the uniform #40 with the Toronto Maple Leafs.

On August 6, 2013, Oreskovic re-signed to a one-year contract for a second season with the ECHL's Toledo Walleye but left the team after ten games into the season.

After a season abroad in the Elite Ice Hockey League with the Nottingham Panthers, Oreskovic returned to Canada, signing a one-year contract with the Brampton Beast of the Central Hockey League on September 4, 2014 (the CHL joined the ECHL in October). He was injured early in the 2014–15 season and retired before the end of the season. He later joined the Beast as an assistant coach before resigning at the end of the season.

== Personal ==
Oreskovic is a Croatian Canadian. Phil's father was born in Croatia and emigrated to Canada in 1962, and he fluently speaks Croatian.

== Career statistics ==
			Regular season					Playoffs
Season	Team	League	GP	G	A	Pts	PIM	GP	G	A	Pts	PIM
2003–04	Brampton Battalion	OHL	66	0	7	7	64	12	0	2	2	16
2004–05	Brampton Battalion	OHL	61	1	6	7	147	6	0	0	0	4
2005–06	Brampton Battalion	OHL	65	3	9	12	202	11	0	0	0	34
2006–07	Brampton Battalion	OHL	36	2	12	14	113	—	—	—	—	—
2006–07	Owen Sound Attack	OHL	26	1	7	8	66	4	0	0	0	2
2006–07	Toronto Marlies	AHL	3	0	1	1	2	—	—	—	—	—
2007–08	Columbia Inferno	ECHL	13	0	4	4	19	—	—	—	—	—
2007–08	Toronto Marlies	AHL	54	1	9	10	68	7	0	1	1	11
2008–09	Toronto Marlies	AHL	65	1	10	11	103	6	0	0	0	12
2008–09	Toronto Maple Leafs	NHL	10	1	1	2	21	—	—	—	—	—
2009–10	Toronto Marlies	AHL	74	2	7	9	142	—	—	—	—	—
2010–11	Hershey Bears	AHL	14	0	0	0	22	1	0	0	0	0
2011–12	South Carolina Stingrays	ECHL	56	1	5	6	110	9	0	2	2	11
2011–12	Hershey Bears	AHL	6	0	1	1	9	—	—	—	—	—
2012–13	Toledo Walleye	ECHL	68	1	13	14	121	6	0	0	0	14
2013–14	Toledo Walleye	ECHL	10	0	0	0	15	—	—	—	—	—
2013–14	Nottingham Panthers	EIHL	24	0	3	3	27	2	0	0	0	4
2014–15	Brampton Beast	ECHL	14	0	1	1	26	—	—	—	—	—
AHL totals			216	4	28	32	346	14	0	1	1	23
NHL totals			10	1	1	2	21	—	—	—	—	—
