= Jay Harrison =

Canadian ice hockey player (born 1982)

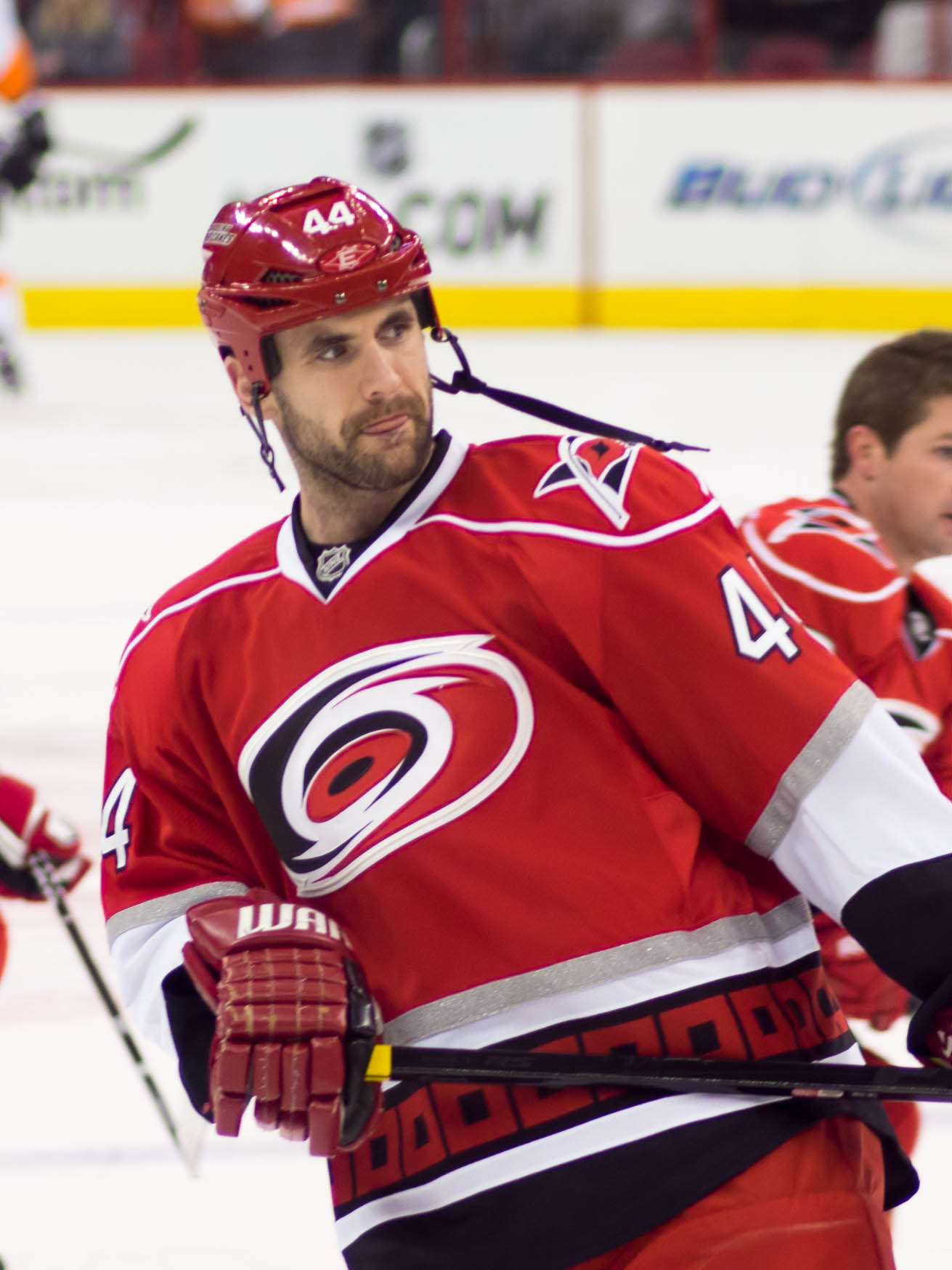
- Born: November 3, 1982 (age 43) Oshawa, Ontario, Canada
- Height: 6 ft 4 in (193 cm)
- Weight: 211 lb (96 kg; 15 st 1 lb)
- Position: Defence
- Shot: Left
- Played for: Toronto Maple Leafs; Carolina Hurricanes; Winnipeg Jets
- National team: Canada
- NHL draft: 82nd overall, 2001; Toronto Maple Leafs
- Playing career: 2002–2016

Jay Harrison (born November 3, 1982) is a Canadian former professional ice hockey defenceman who played for the Toronto Maple Leafs, Carolina Hurricanes and the Winnipeg Jets of the National Hockey League.

== Playing career ==
=== Amateur ===
Harrison played in the 1996 Quebec International Pee-Wee Hockey Tournament with the Whitby Wildcats minor ice hockey team. He later played as a 16-year-old for the Oshawa Legionnaires of the Ontario Junior Hockey League (OJHL). He was the 1st overall selection of the Brampton Battalion in the 1998 OHL Priority Selection. He spent four seasons in the OHL with the Battalion.

=== Professional ===
Harrison was drafted by the Toronto Maple Leafs in the third round, 82nd overall, of the 2001 NHL entry draft. After spending four seasons in the American Hockey League (AHL) with Toronto's farm team, Harrison made his NHL debut on January 27, 2006, against the Montreal Canadiens, in which he registered his first NHL career point, coming in the form of an assist. On June 16, 2008, Harrison signed a one-year contract with EV Zug of the Swiss National League A, but on March 27, 2009, he returned to the Toronto Maple Leafs, signing a deal, pro-rated at $475,000, to play out the rest of the 2008–09 season. On July 9, 2009, he signed a two-way contract with the Carolina Hurricanes that would pay him $500,000 in the NHL and $125,000 in the AHL. On October 9, 2009, he scored his first NHL goal in a 7–2 victory for the Hurricanes over the Florida Panthers.

During the 2014–15 season, Harrison was traded by the Hurricanes to the Winnipeg Jets in exchange for a 2015 NHL entry draft sixth round pick on December 18, 2014.

In the following 2015–16 season, on the eve of opening night on October 6, 2015, Harrison cleared waivers, and was reassigned to the Manitoba Moose of the American Hockey League. In returning to the AHL for the first time since 2010, Harrison appeared in 18 games with the Moose before he was included in a trade deadline deal by the Jets, along with Andrew Ladd and Matt Fraser to the Chicago Blackhawks in exchange for Marko Daňo and a first-round pick in the 2016 NHL entry draft on February 25, 2016. He was immediately assigned to the Blackhawks AHL affiliate, the Rockford IceHogs.

== Personal life ==
Harrison and his wife Jodean have four daughters. The family moved to Bowmanville, Ontario following his retirement from hockey.

Harrison earned degrees in psychology and counselling and works for Game Change, a counselling service designed for athletes. He also serves as a consultant to the NHL on player assistance issues.

== Career statistics ==
=== Regular season and playoffs ===
			Regular season					Playoffs
Season	Team	League	GP	G	A	Pts	PIM	GP	G	A	Pts	PIM
1997–98	Oshawa Legionaires	MetJHL	47	10	12	22	126	—	—	—	—	—
1998–99	Brampton Battalion	OHL	63	1	14	15	108	—	—	—	—	—
1999–00	Brampton Battalion	OHL	68	2	18	20	139	6	0	2	2	15
2000–01	Brampton Battalion	OHL	53	4	15	19	112	9	1	1	2	17
2001–02	Brampton Battalion	OHL	61	12	31	43	116	—	—	—	—	—
2001–02	St. John's Maple Leafs	AHL	7	0	1	1	2	10	0	0	0	4
2001–02	Memphis RiverKings	CHL	—	—	—	—	—	1	0	0	0	2
2002–03	St. John's Maple Leafs	AHL	72	2	8	10	72	—	—	—	—	—
2003–04	St. John's Maple Leafs	AHL	70	4	5	9	141	—	—	—	—	—
2004–05	St. John's Maple Leafs	AHL	60	0	4	4	108	4	0	1	1	14
2005–06	Toronto Marlies	AHL	57	9	20	29	100	5	1	3	4	8
2005–06	Toronto Maple Leafs	NHL	8	0	1	1	2	—	—	—	—	—
2006–07	Toronto Marlies	AHL	41	4	14	18	68	—	—	—	—	—
2006–07	Toronto Maple Leafs	NHL	5	0	0	0	6	—	—	—	—	—
2007–08	Toronto Marlies	AHL	69	13	14	27	73	18	2	10	12	35
2008–09	EV Zug	NLA	41	6	9	15	46	—	—	—	—	—
2008–09	Toronto Maple Leafs	NHL	7	0	1	1	10	—	—	—	—	—
2009–10	Carolina Hurricanes	NHL	38	1	5	6	50	—	—	—	—	—
2009–10	Albany River Rats	AHL	32	2	12	14	22	8	0	3	3	23
2010–11	Carolina Hurricanes	NHL	72	3	7	10	72	—	—	—	—	—
2011–12	Carolina Hurricanes	NHL	72	9	14	23	60	—	—	—	—	—
2012–13	Carolina Hurricanes	NHL	47	3	7	10	51	—	—	—	—	—
2013–14	Carolina Hurricanes	NHL	68	4	11	15	44	—	—	—	—	—
2014–15	Carolina Hurricanes	NHL	20	1	3	4	42	—	—	—	—	—
2014–15	Winnipeg Jets	NHL	35	2	3	5	23	—	—	—	—	—
2015–16	Manitoba Moose	AHL	18	3	2	5	17	—	—	—	—	—
NHL totals			372	23	52	75	360	—	—	—	—	—

Medal record

Representing Canada

Ice hockey

World Junior Championships
Silver medal – second place	2002 Pardubice	
Bronze medal – third place	2001 Moscow	

=== International ===
Year	Team	Event	GP	G	A	Pts	PIM
1999	Canada	WJC18	3	1	0	1	2
2001	Canada	WJC	7	0	0	0	2
2002	Canada	WJC	7	0	1	1	6
2013	Canada	WC	8	0	1	1	2
Junior totals			17	1	1	2	10
Senior totals			8	0	1	1	2

== Awards and honours ==
Award	Year
OHL
All-Rookie Team	1999
