= Michael Sgarbossa =

Canadian ice hockey player (born 1992)

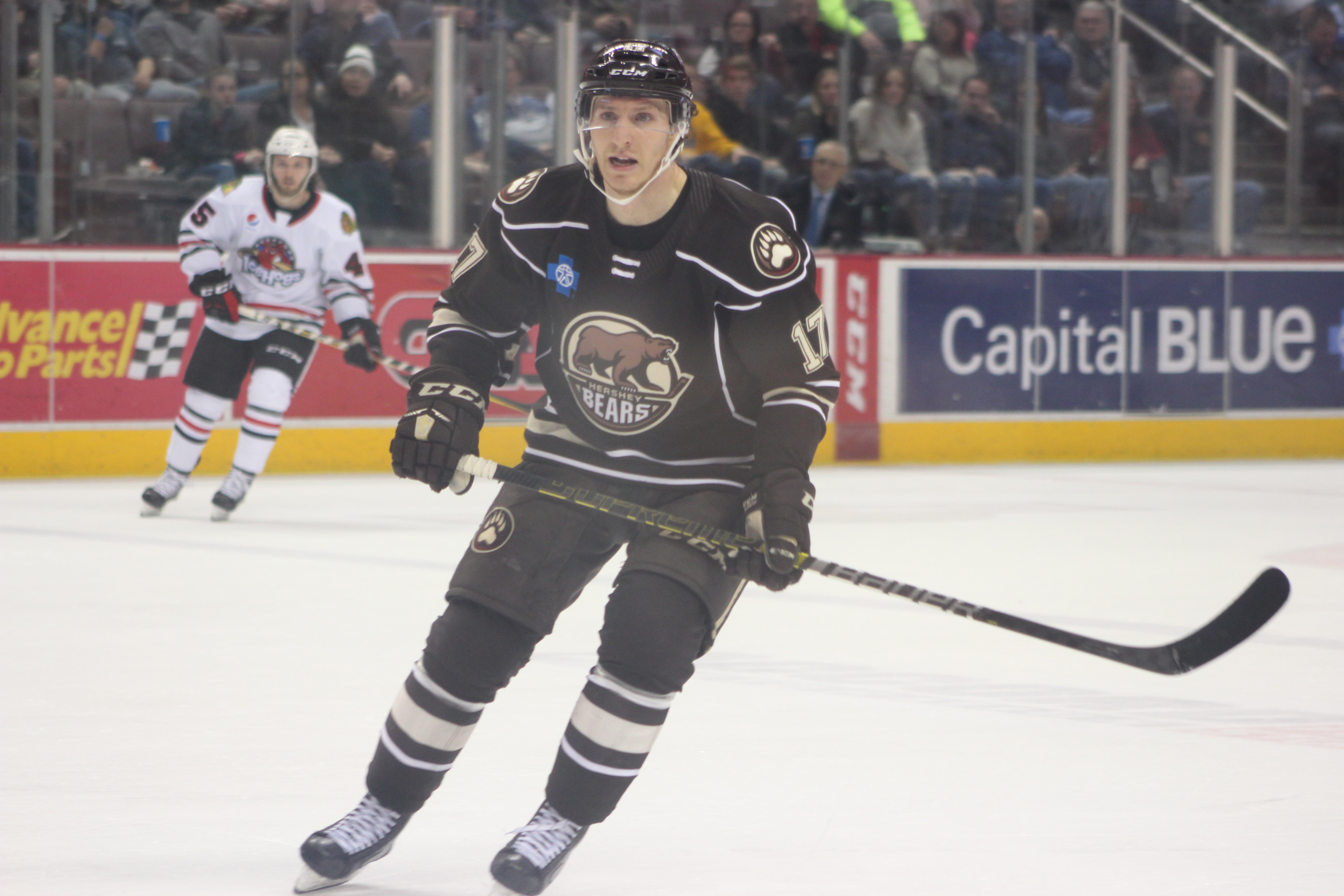
- Sgarbossa with the Hershey Bears in 2019
- Born: July 25, 1992 (age 34) Campbellville, Ontario, Canada
- Height: 6 ft 0 in (183 cm)
- Weight: 190 lb (86 kg; 13 st 8 lb)
- Position: Centre
- Shoots: Left
- AHL team Former teams: Texas Stars; Colorado Avalanche; Anaheim Ducks; Florida Panthers; Washington Capitals; HC Lugano; SC Bern
- NHL draft: Undrafted
- Playing career: 2012–present

Michael Sgarbossa (born July 25, 1992) is a Canadian professional ice hockey forward for the Texas Stars in the American Hockey League (AHL).

== Playing career ==
As a youth, Sgarbossa played in the 2005 Quebec International Pee-Wee Hockey Tournament with a minor ice hockey team from Halton, Ontario.

He later played midget hockey with the Halton Hurricanes of the South-Central Triple A Hockey League before he was selected 54th overall in the 2008 OHL Priority Selection by the Barrie Colts. In his first Major junior season with the Colts he finished fourth in team scoring with 43 points in 67 games. Adapting to the OHL, Sgarbossa increased his scoring rate and was traded midway through the 2009–10 season, to the Saginaw Spirit.

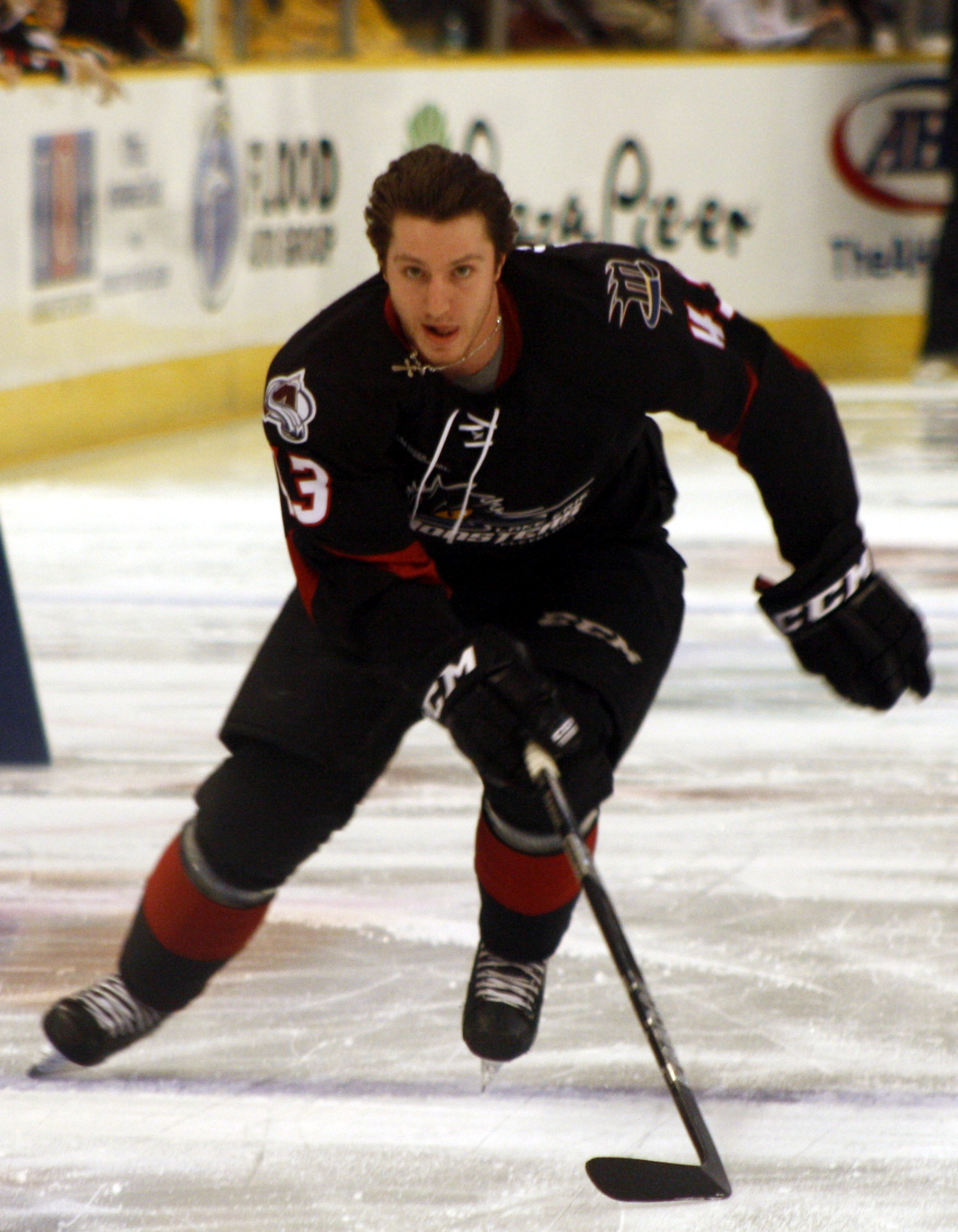
Sgarbossa with the Lake Erie Monsters in 2013

Sgarbossa was passed over in the 2010 NHL entry draft but was signed as a free agent by the San Jose Sharks to a three-year entry-level contract on September 21, 2010. Sgarbossa was signed after appearing in the NHL YoungStars tournament for the Sharks, scoring 3 goals and 4 points in 2 contests. Sgarbossa was again on the move in the OHL the following 2010–11 season when he was traded by the Spirit to the Sudbury Wolves. He immediately made an impact with the Wolves to lead the team in scoring for the remainder of the campaign with 62 points in only 37 games.

During the 2011–12 season, whilst with the Wolves, Sgarbossa's NHL rights were traded by San Jose at the trade deadline on February 27, 2012, to the Colorado Avalanche, along with Jamie McGinn and Mike Connolly in exchange for Daniel Winnik, TJ Galiardi and a seventh round draft selection. At the conclusion of the season, marking the end of his junior career, Sgarbossa became the first Sudbury Wolves player in 33 years, since Mike Foligno, to claim the Eddie Powers Memorial Trophy as the OHL's leading point scorer with 102 points. Finishing second in league MVP voting and earning a selection in the First All-Star team, Sgarbossa was given the accolade as Sudbury Professional Athlete of the year. In his first professional season in 2012–13, Sgarbossa was directly assigned by the Avalanche to their AHL affiliate, the Lake Erie Monsters, due to the ongoing NHL lockout. He made his professional debut on opening night in a 2–1 victory over the Oklahoma City Barons on October 12, 2012. Sgarbossa quickly established himself as one of the Avalanche's top prospects by immediately becoming an offensive leader for the Monsters. At the midpoint of the season, and leading the Monsters in scoring, tied for second amongst rookies in the AHL, he was selected alongside fellow Monsters rookie Andrew Agozzino to participate in the AHL All-Star Game. Straight after contributing to a Western Conference All-Star victory, Sgarbossa received his first NHL recall to the Avalanche on January 29, 2013. He made his NHL debut the next day for the Avalanche in a 3–0 road defeat against the Vancouver Canucks. After six scoreless games with Colorado, Sgarbossa was returned to Lake Erie, to continue his season. On February 26, his ability to also play with an edge was evident as he was suspended by the AHL for one game after a slashing incident with Michael Liambas of the Milwaukee Admirals.

In the 2014–15 season at the trade deadline, Sgarbossa was traded by the Avalanche to the Anaheim Ducks in exchange for Mat Clark on March 2, 2015. He was assigned to AHL affiliate the Norfolk Admirals. Sgarbossa began the 2016–17 season within the AHL with the San Diego Gulls before he was recalled to the Ducks. He had appeared in a career high 9 games with 2 assists for the Ducks before he was dealt to the Florida Panthers in exchange for Logan Shaw on November 16, 2016. He was instantly re-assigned to the Panthers affiliate, the Springfield Thunderbirds. Sgarbossa impressed with the Thunderbirds and was quickly recalled to the Panthers. Enjoying his longest stint in the NHL, Sgarbossa closed out the season in Florida, appearing in 29 games for 2 goals and 7 points.

Following the completion of the season with the Panthers, Sgarbossa was not tendered a qualifying offer as a restricted free agent. On July 1, 2017, Sgarbossa signed a one-year, one-way $650,000 deal with the Winnipeg Jets. He was assigned to AHL affiliate, the Manitoba Moose, for the duration of the 2017–18 season, posting 40 points in 68 games. As a free agent from the Jets, Sgarbossa left to sign a one-year, two-way contract with reigning Stanley Cup champions, the Washington Capitals, on July 1, 2018. In the following 2018–19 season, Sgarbossa led the Capitals' AHL affiliate, the Hershey Bears, with 30 goals and 65 points, which tied for ninth in the AHL and set personal AHL career highs in goals, assists and points. In the post-season he added 3 points in five playoff games.

On June 29, 2019, Sgarbossa agreed to a two-year, two-way $700,000 contract extension to remain with the Capitals. After signing a two-year extension, Sgarbossa was called up from the AHL to the Capitals on November 20, 2019, where he played in two games registering zero points with an average 8:07 TOI per game. He was reassigned to Hershey on November 24, 2019.

The American Hockey League announced Sgarbossa was selected to the 2020 AHL All-Star Classic alongside fellow Bears teammate, Matt Moulson. This is his second All-Star selection, his last came with the Lake Erie Monsters in 2013 where he put up 44 points in 57 GP.

On May 8, 2023, Sgarbossa signed a two year, two-way contract extension with the Capitals, placing him among the highest paid players in the AHL.

On February 5, 2024, the Capitals recalled Sgarbossa from the Bears to replace Evgeny Kuznetsov, who left the team to enter the NHLPA’s Player Assistance Program.

After seven years within the Capitals organization, Sgarbossa left following the 2024–25 season, opting to continue his career abroad in signing a two-year contract with Swiss club, HC Lugano of the NL, on May 22, 2025. In the following 2025–26 season, Sgarbossa made 27 appearances for the Ticino based club, posting 18 points before he moving to SC Bern on loan on January 12, 2026. Producing at a point-per-game pace with Bern, Sgarbossa registered 13 points through the final 12 games of the season.

At the beginning of April, Sgarbossa's contract with Lugano was terminated by mutual agreement, and he was signed to a one-year deal with SC Rapperswil-Jona Lakers on April 10, 2026. However before commencing his contract with the Lakers, Sgarbossa opted to mutually terminate his contract to remain in North America for family reasons on July 4, 2026. He was signed to a one-year AHL contract with the Texas Stars, affiliate to the Dallas Stars, on July 8, 2026.

== Career statistics ==
=== Regular season and playoffs ===
			Regular season					Playoffs
Season	Team	League	GP	G	A	Pts	PIM	GP	G	A	Pts	PIM
2007–08	Halton Hurricanes AAA	SCTA U16	61	53	51	104	41	—	—	—	—	—
2008–09	Barrie Colts	OHL	67	10	33	43	43	5	3	3	6	10
2009–10	Barrie Colts	OHL	19	7	13	20	14	—	—	—	—	—
2009–10	Saginaw Spirit	OHL	48	13	19	32	49	6	0	2	2	4
2010–11	Saginaw Spirit	OHL	26	7	13	20	24	—	—	—	—	—
2010–11	Sudbury Wolves	OHL	37	29	33	62	53	8	5	9	14	16
2011–12	Sudbury Wolves	OHL	66	47	55	102	68	4	2	1	3	6
2012–13	Lake Erie Monsters	AHL	57	19	25	44	71	—	—	—	—	—
2012–13	Colorado Avalanche	NHL	6	0	0	0	4	—	—	—	—	—
2013–14	Lake Erie Monsters	AHL	49	5	15	20	56	—	—	—	—	—
2014–15	Lake Erie Monsters	AHL	40	4	19	23	35	—	—	—	—	—
2014–15	Colorado Avalanche	NHL	3	0	1	1	10	—	—	—	—	—
2014–15	Norfolk Admirals	AHL	20	6	9	15	29	—	—	—	—	—
2015–16	San Diego Gulls	AHL	62	17	27	44	48	5	1	4	5	2
2015–16	Anaheim Ducks	NHL	1	0	0	0	0	—	—	—	—	—
2016–17	San Diego Gulls	AHL	2	1	0	1	0	—	—	—	—	—
2016–17	Anaheim Ducks	NHL	9	0	2	2	0	—	—	—	—	—
2016–17	Springfield Thunderbirds	AHL	14	4	8	12	16	—	—	—	—	—
2016–17	Florida Panthers	NHL	29	2	5	7	9	—	—	—	—	—
2017–18	Manitoba Moose	AHL	68	16	24	40	88	9	2	3	5	14
2018–19	Hershey Bears	AHL	75	30	35	65	91	5	1	2	3	8
2019–20	Hershey Bears	AHL	39	13	27	40	16	—	—	—	—	—
2019–20	Washington Capitals	NHL	2	0	0	0	0	—	—	—	—	—
2020–21	Washington Capitals	NHL	5	0	2	2	0	—	—	—	—	—
2020–21	Hershey Bears	AHL	14	5	5	10	8	—	—	—	—	—
2021–22	Hershey Bears	AHL	30	10	11	21	10	3	1	0	1	0
2021–22	Washington Capitals	NHL	10	2	2	4	0	—	—	—	—	—
2022–23	Hershey Bears	AHL	60	21	37	58	38	4	1	2	3	0
2023–24	Hershey Bears	AHL	44	7	36	43	24	—	—	—	—	—
2023–24	Washington Capitals	NHL	25	4	3	7	2	—	—	—	—	—
2024–25	Hershey Bears	AHL	35	7	24	31	14	6	0	2	2	2
2024–25	Washington Capitals	NHL	3	1	1	2	2	—	—	—	—	—
2025–26	HC Lugano	NL	27	9	9	18	16	—	—	—	—	—
2025–26	SC Bern	NL	12	3	10	13	4	1	0	1	1	0
NHL totals			93	9	16	25	27	—	—	—	—	—

=== International ===
Year	Team	Event	Result	GP	G	A	Pts	PIM
2010	Canada	U18	7th	6	1	1	2	4
Junior totals				6	1	1	2	4

== Awards and honours ==
Award	Year
OHL
Eddie Powers Memorial Trophy	2012
OHL First Team All-Star	2012
Sudbury Professional Athlete of the Year	2012
AHL
All-Star Game	2013
Calder Cup	2023
