= Mat Clark =

American-born Canadian ice hockey player

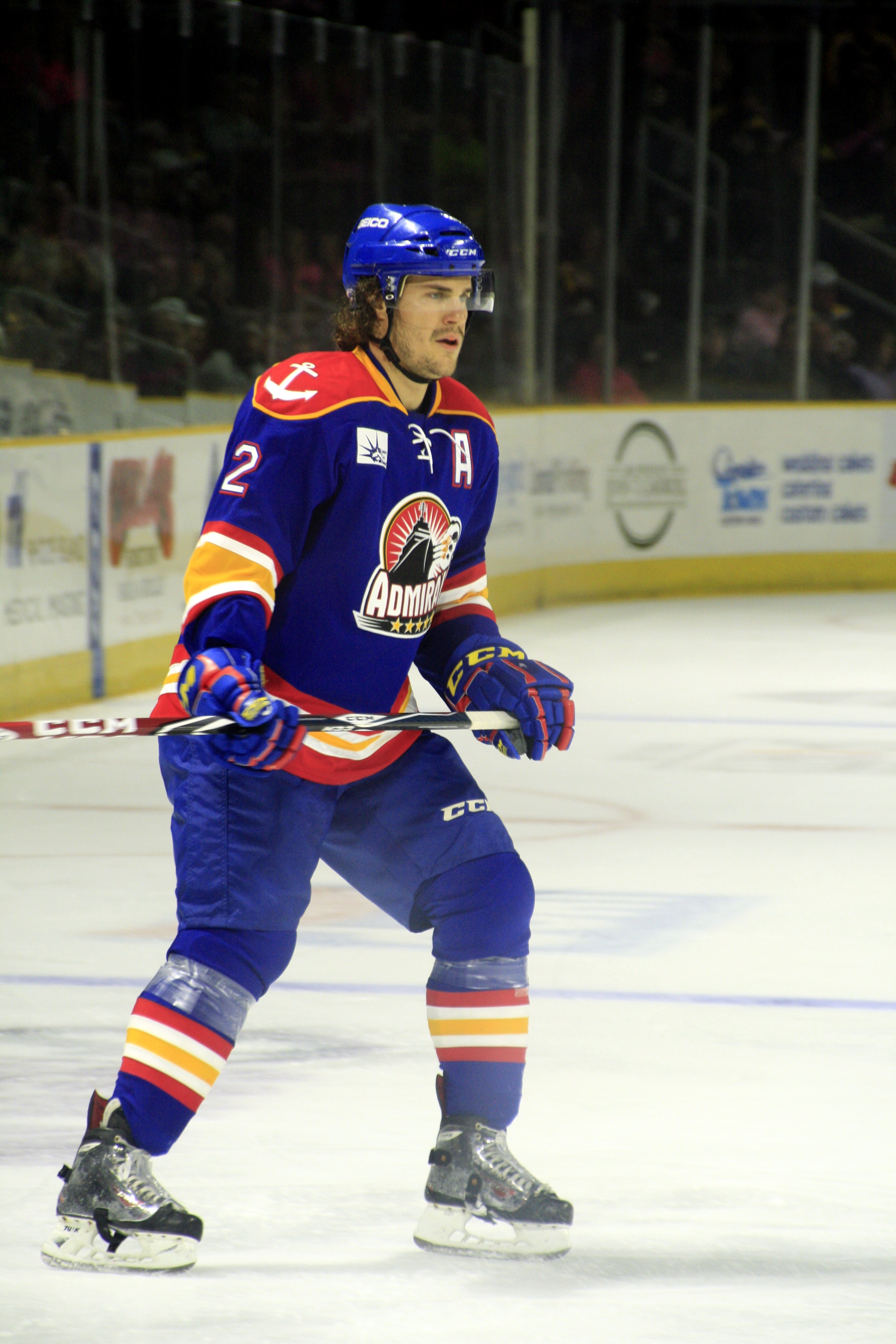
- Born: October 17, 1990 (age 35) Lakewood, Colorado, U.S.
- Height: 6 ft 3 in (191 cm)
- Weight: 212 lb (96 kg; 15 st 2 lb)
- Position: Defence
- Shot: Right
- Played for: Anaheim Ducks; HC Bolzano; Vienna Capitals
- NHL draft: 37th overall, 2009; Anaheim Ducks
- Playing career: 2010–2019

Mathew Clark (born October 17, 1990) is an American-born Canadian former professional ice hockey defenseman. He played in the National Hockey League with the Anaheim Ducks, after he was selected by the Ducks in the 2nd round (37th overall) of the 2009 NHL entry draft.

== Playing career ==
The son of a Canadian father, Mat Clark was born in Lakewood, Colorado, before he moved to Milton, Ontario with his family when he was four. Prior to turning professional, Clark played major junior hockey in the Ontario Hockey League with the Brampton Battalion. After two seasons with the Battalion, and showing potential as a physical defensive defenseman by being selected as the best body checker and defensive defenseman in the Eastern Conference poll, he was signed to a three-year entry-level contract with the Anaheim Ducks on March 31, 2010. He immediately made his professional debut at the end of the 2009–10 season with affiliate, the Manitoba Moose against the Peoria Rivermen on April 10, 2010.

In his rookie professional season with the Ducks in 2010–11, Clark was assigned to AHL affiliate, the Syracuse Crunch. As only one of two, he played in every game with the Crunch to collect 2 goals and 18 points in 80 games. In the following 2011–12 season, on March 31, 2012, Clark received his first NHL recall by Anaheim. He made his NHL debut the following day in the Ducks final home game of the season, a 2-1 defeat against the Edmonton Oilers.

On July 15, 2013, the Anaheim Ducks re-signed Clark to a one-year contract extension.

In his fifth season with the Ducks organization in 2014–15, Clark was recalled from AHL affiliate in the Norfolk Admirals to play at the NHL level for the first time in three seasons on November 9, 2014. Clark endured his longest stretch with the Ducks appearing in 7 games and registering his first NHL point, an assist on a goal to Matt Beleskey, against the Calgary Flames on November 25, 2014. After he was reassigned back to the Admirals, on March 2, 2015, Clark was traded by the Ducks to the Colorado Avalanche in exchange for Michael Sgarbossa. He was immediately assigned to remain in the AHL with the Lake Erie Monsters.

Following the 2014–15 NHL season Clark became a restricted free agent under the NHL Collective Bargaining Agreement. The Colorado Avalanche made him a qualifying offer to retain his NHL rights and, on July 5, 2015, Clark filed for salary arbitration. He later settled prior to arbitration to a two-way, two-year contract with the Avalanche on July 16, 2015.

At the completion of his contract with the Avalanche, in which he spent exclusively with AHL affiliate the San Antonio Rampage, Clark left as a free agent. Unable to earn another NHL contract, Clark agreed to his first contract abroad in signing a one-year deal with Italian based club, HCB South Tyrol of the EBEL, on August 4, 2017. In the 2017–18 season, Clark was a staple on the blueline for Bolzano contributing with 5 assists in 25 regular season games. As a shutdown defenseman, he matched his 5 assists in the post-season, helping the Italians win the EBEL in a Game 7 victory over EC Red Bull Salzburg.

Clark at the expiration of his contract with Bolzano, opted to continue in the EBEL, securing a one-year deal with the Vienna Capitals on July 25, 2018.

Following two seasons in Europe in the EBEL, Clark opted to conclude his 9 year professional career, announcing his retirement on May 18, 2019.

== Career statistics ==
			Regular season					Playoffs
Season	Team	League	GP	G	A	Pts	PIM	GP	G	A	Pts	PIM
2006–07	Brampton Capitals	OPJHL	47	2	7	9	50	8	1	1	2	19
2007–08	Brampton Capitals	OPJHL	46	6	11	17	82	8	1	4	5	45
2008–09	Brampton Battalion	OHL	63	3	20	23	91	21	0	5	5	37
2009–10	Brampton Battalion	OHL	66	7	16	23	88	7	2	4	6	9
2009–10	Manitoba Moose	AHL	1	0	0	0	0	6	0	0	0	2
2010–11	Syracuse Crunch	AHL	80	2	14	16	128	—	—	—	—	—
2011–12	Syracuse Crunch	AHL	62	1	11	12	72	4	1	1	2	11
2011–12	Anaheim Ducks	NHL	2	0	0	0	0	—	—	—	—	—
2012–13	Norfolk Admirals	AHL	71	1	9	10	79	—	—	—	—	—
2013–14	Norfolk Admirals	AHL	23	0	2	2	37	—	—	—	—	—
2014–15	Norfolk Admirals	AHL	44	1	5	6	60	—	—	—	—	—
2014–15	Anaheim Ducks	NHL	7	0	1	1	6	—	—	—	—	—
2014–15	Lake Erie Monsters	AHL	21	0	1	1	11	—	—	—	—	—
2015–16	San Antonio Rampage	AHL	60	1	7	8	36	—	—	—	—	—
2016–17	San Antonio Rampage	AHL	38	1	7	8	29	—	—	—	—	—
2017–18	HC Bolzano	EBEL	25	0	5	5	4	18	0	5	5	20
2018–19	Vienna Capitals	EBEL	50	3	15	18	16	18	0	2	2	10
NHL totals			9	0	1	1	6	—	—	—	—	—

== Awards and honours ==
Award	Year
EBEL
Champion (HC Bolzano)	2018
