= Sam Carrick =

Canadian ice hockey player (born 1992)

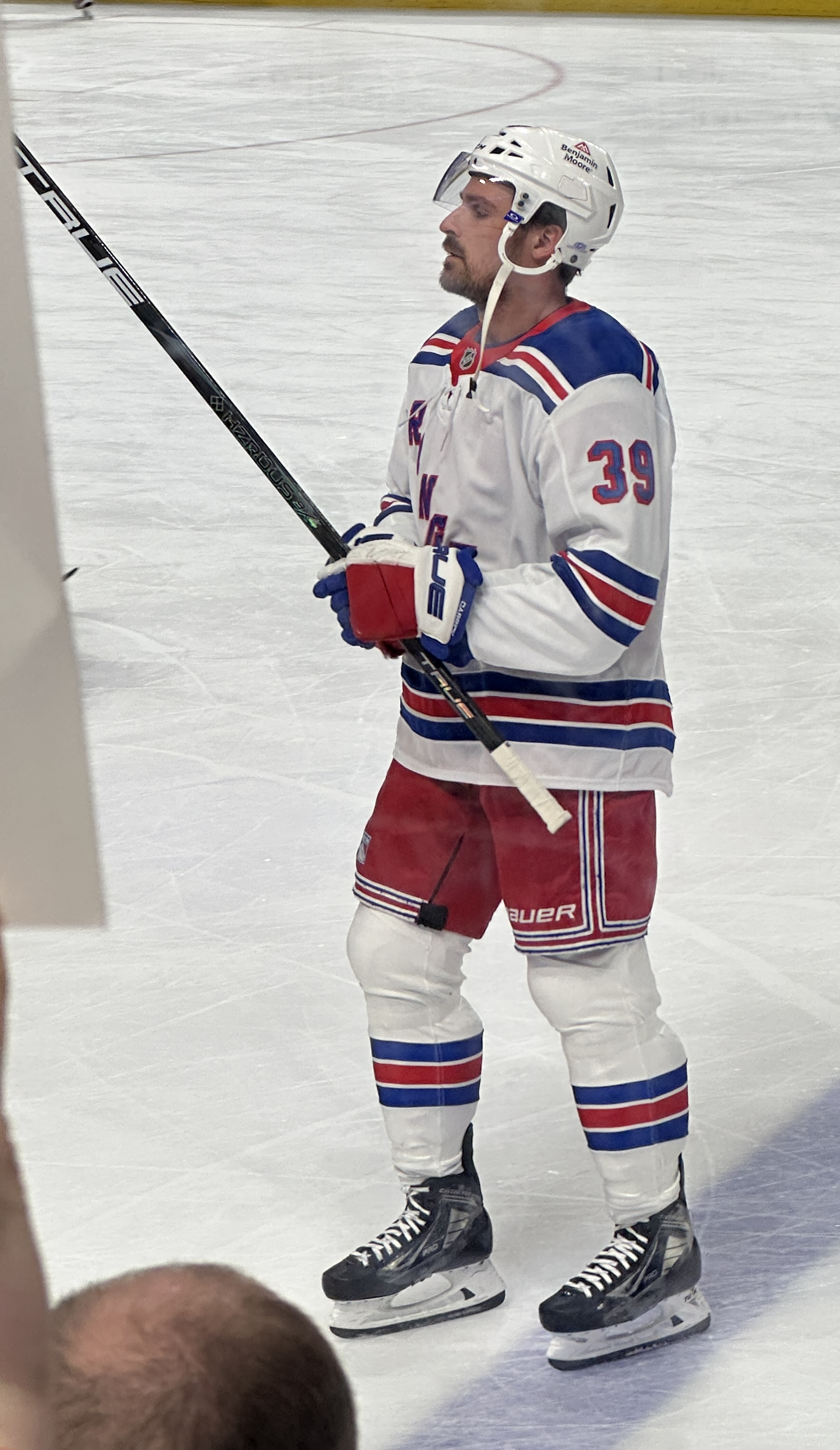
- Carrick with the New York Rangers in 2025
- Born: February 4, 1992 (age 34) Stouffville, Ontario, Canada
- Height: 6 ft 0 in (183 cm)
- Weight: 200 lb (91 kg; 14 st 4 lb)
- Position: Centre
- Shoots: Right
- NHL team Former teams: Buffalo Sabres; Toronto Maple Leafs; Anaheim Ducks; Edmonton Oilers; New York Rangers
- NHL draft: 144th overall, 2010; Toronto Maple Leafs
- Playing career: 2012–present

Sam Carrick (born February 4, 1992) is a Canadian professional ice hockey player who is a centre for the Buffalo Sabres of the National Hockey League (NHL). He was selected by the Toronto Maple Leafs in the fifth round, 144th overall, in the 2010 NHL entry draft. He also previously played with the Anaheim Ducks, Edmonton Oilers, and New York Rangers.

== Playing career ==
=== Junior ===
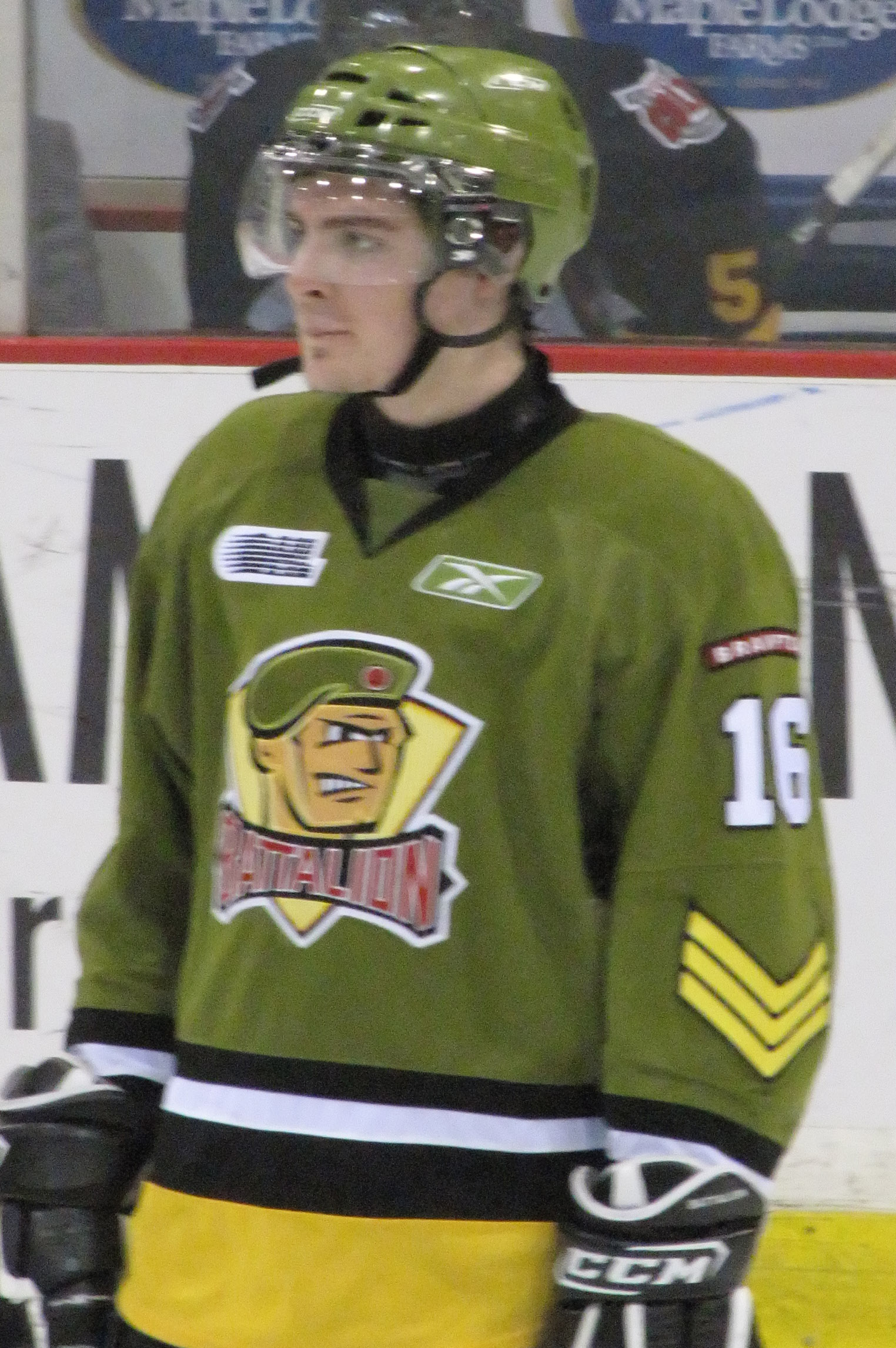
Carrick with the Brampton Battalion in 2010

As a youth, Carrick played in the 2005 Quebec International Pee-Wee Hockey Tournament with the Markham Waxers minor ice hockey team. After playing his Minor Midget season for the Toronto Red Wings of the Greater Toronto Hockey League, Carrick was drafted and played major junior hockey in the Ontario Hockey League (OHL) with the Brampton Battalion. He was a first round choice in the 2008 OHL Priority Selection draft. In his first season, Carrick was a part of the Brampton team that was defeated in the OHL final four games to one by the Windsor Spitfires. In his second season, Carrick set new highs in goals and points, which led him to chosen by the Toronto Maple Leafs of the National Hockey League (NHL) in the fifth round, 144th overall, of the 2010 NHL entry draft. Carrick served as an alternate captain for his third season with Brampton during the 2010–11 OHL season, registering 16 goals and 39 points in 59 games. He was named captain of the Battalion for the 2011–12 season. He was among the players credited with the Battalion's resurgence that season. He finished the season with junior career highs of 37 goals and 67 points in 68 games.

=== Professional ===
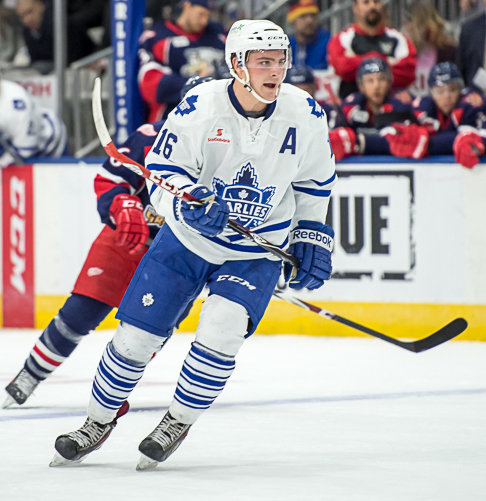
Carrick with the Toronto Marlies in 2014

On April 1, 2012, Carrick signed a three-year entry-level contract with the Toronto Maple Leafs. Toronto assigned Carrick to the ECHL for at the beginning of the 2012–13 season, where he made his professional debut with the Idaho Steelheads. In 50 games with the Steelheads, Carrick scored 16 goals and 37 points. He was reassigned to the Maple Leafs American Hockey League (AHL) affiliate, the Toronto Marlies on March 1, 2013. He finished his rookie season with the Marlies scoring two goals in 19 games. In his first full season in the AHL he registered 14 goals in 62 games. He was named an alternate captain with the Marlies that season.

In the final year of his entry-level contract, Carrick was still assigned to the Marlies, despite having impressed during the pre-season training camp. Carrick received his first NHL recall by the Maple Leafs early into the 2014–15 season to replace an injured Joffrey Lupul. He made his NHL debut in a 3–2 victory over the Chicago Blackhawks on November 1, 2014. He scored his first NHL goal on March 26, 2015 against the Florida Panthers, and was named third star of the game. He played in 16 games with the Maple Leafs registering the one goal and two points. Carrick also added 9 goals and 26 points in 59 games with the Marlies. At the end of the season, he re-signed with the Maple Leafs on a one-year contract. In the 2015–16 season, Carrick put up 16 goals and 34 points in 52 games with the Marlies and played in three games with the Maple Leafs.

Carrick was not tendered a qualifying offer from the Maple Leafs following the season and became an unrestricted free agent. On July 1, 2016, Carrick signed a one-year, two-way contract with the Chicago Blackhawks. Carrick was assigned to AHL affiliate, the Rockford IceHogs to begin the 2016–17 season. He was second in team scoring with 28 points in 53 games by the NHL trade deadline, when Carrick was dealt by the Blackhawks, along with Spencer Abbott to the Anaheim Ducks in exchange for Kenton Helgesen and a seventh round pick in the 2019 NHL entry draft on March 1, 2017. Carrick and Abbott were the top scorers for the IceHogs at the time.

Upon joining Anaheim, the Ducks assigned him to their AHL affiliate, the San Diego Gulls, where he collected 11 points in 15 games. He added 7 points in 10 playoff games for the Gulls. On June 6, 2017, Carrick signed a two-year, two-way contract with Anaheim. During the 2018–19 season, Carrick played in six games for Anaheim earning his first point with the team on March 30, 2019, versus the Edmonton Oilers. He added 32 goals and 69 points with the Gulls that season, and 7 goals and 14 points in 16 playoff games. On June 29, 2019, the Ducks re-signed Carrick to a one-year contract. On October 18, 2019, Carrick was named captain of the Gulls. During the 2019–20 season, Carrick played in nine games with the Ducks scoring his first goal (a shorthanded goal) versus the New York Islanders on December 21, 2019 and registering 23 goals and 43 points in 46 games with the Gulls. He was re-signed to another one-year contract by the Ducks on May 10, 2020.

During the pandemic-shortened 2020–21 season, Carrick played in 13 games with the Ducks, registering 2 goals and 6 points. In October Carrick was recalled from the Gulls early in the 2021–22 season. and after playing a career-high 64 games with Anaheim scoring 11 goals and 19 points, he was rewarded with a two-year contract extension. Carrick suffered a hip injury in September during the 2022–23 Ducks training camp, sidelining him for six months.

Carrick began the 2023–24 season with the Ducks, playing in 61 games, scoring eight goals and 11 points. On March 6, 2024, he was traded to the Edmonton Oilers along with Adam Henrique. He made his Oilers debut on March 7 in a 3–2 loss to the Columbus Blue Jackets. He registered his first goal and point as an Oiler in a 3–2 loss to the Colorado Avalanche on March 16. In 16 regular season games with the Oilers, he scored two goals and five points. The Oilers made the 2024 Stanley Cup playoffs and Carrick made his NHL playoff debut on April 22 in Game 1 of the first round series versus the Los Angeles Kings. He skated on a line with Evander Kane and Mattias Janmark. He played in ten playoff games, registering just one assist, as the Oilers advanced to the 2024 Stanley Cup Final. In the end, the Oilers were defeated by the Florida Panthers in seven games.

At the conclusion of his contract with the Oilers, on July 1, 2024, Carrick signed as a free agent to a three-year, $3 million contract with the New York Rangers. He scored his first goal as a Ranger in his first game with the team, the season-opening 6–0 victory over the Pittsburgh Penguins on October 9.

On March 6, 2026, Carrick was traded to the Buffalo Sabres in exchange for a third-round pick and a sixth-round selection in the 2026 NHL entry draft.

== Personal life ==
Carrick is the son to John F. and Jane Carrick. John played junior C hockey with the Stouffville 70s. He is the second of four brothers who are all accomplished ice hockey players: brothers Jake Carrick (born 1990), Trevor Carrick (born 1994) and Josh Carrick (born 1995), have all played major junior ice hockey in the OHL. Trevor was drafted by the Carolina Hurricanes in the 2012 NHL entry draft and is currently playing with the Charlotte Checkers of the AHL. Carrick is also a cousin to minor league journeyman Bobby Hughes. He and his brothers own and run a maple syrup company based on their grandfather's hobby of tapping trees.

== Career statistics ==
=== Regular season and playoffs ===
			Regular season					Playoffs
Season	Team	League	GP	G	A	Pts	PIM	GP	G	A	Pts	PIM
2008–09	Brampton Battalion	OHL	61	10	11	21	47	21	1	0	1	16
2009–10	Brampton Battalion	OHL	66	21	21	42	96	8	2	2	4	8
2010–11	Brampton Battalion	OHL	59	16	23	39	74	4	0	1	1	4
2011–12	Brampton Battalion	OHL	68	37	30	67	104	8	4	4	8	16
2012–13	Idaho Steelheads	ECHL	50	16	21	37	70	—	—	—	—	—
2012–13	Toronto Marlies	AHL	19	2	2	4	18	5	0	0	0	0
2013–14	Toronto Marlies	AHL	62	14	21	35	115	14	5	4	9	10
2014–15	Toronto Marlies	AHL	59	9	18	27	112	5	1	2	3	4
2014–15	Toronto Maple Leafs	NHL	16	1	1	2	9	—	—	—	—	—
2015–16	Toronto Marlies	AHL	52	16	18	34	90	12	0	5	5	19
2015–16	Toronto Maple Leafs	NHL	3	0	0	0	4	—	—	—	—	—
2016–17	Rockford IceHogs	AHL	57	11	17	28	85	—	—	—	—	—
2016–17	San Diego Gulls	AHL	15	3	8	11	20	10	4	3	7	14
2017–18	San Diego Gulls	AHL	67	13	28	41	83	—	—	—	—	—
2018–19	San Diego Gulls	AHL	61	32	29	61	90	16	7	7	14	21
2018–19	Anaheim Ducks	NHL	6	0	1	1	2	—	—	—	—	—
2019–20	San Diego Gulls	AHL	46	23	20	43	40	—	—	—	—	—
2019–20	Anaheim Ducks	NHL	9	1	1	2	0	—	—	—	—	—
2020–21	San Diego Gulls	AHL	27	14	10	24	19	3	2	1	3	0
2020–21	Anaheim Ducks	NHL	13	2	4	6	28	—	—	—	—	—
2021–22	San Diego Gulls	AHL	2	1	0	1	14	—	—	—	—	—
2021–22	Anaheim Ducks	NHL	64	11	8	19	85	—	—	—	—	—
2022–23	San Diego Gulls	AHL	4	0	0	0	4	—	—	—	—	—
2022–23	Anaheim Ducks	NHL	52	3	4	7	86	—	—	—	—	—
2023–24	Anaheim Ducks	NHL	61	8	3	11	90	—	—	—	—	—
2023–24	Edmonton Oilers	NHL	16	2	3	5	12	10	0	1	1	12
2024–25	New York Rangers	NHL	80	6	14	20	58	—	—	—	—	—
2025–26	New York Rangers	NHL	60	4	6	10	53	—	—	—	—	—
2025–26	Buffalo Sabres	NHL	13	5	1	6	12	1	0	0	0	2
NHL totals			393	43	46	89	439	11	0	1	1	14

=== International ===
Year	Team	Event	Result	GP	G	A	Pts	PIM
2009	Canada Ontario	WHC17	1st place, gold medalist(s)	6	1	3	4	14
Junior totals				6	1	3	4	14
