= 2005–06 OHL season =

- League: Ontario Hockey League
- Sport: Hockey
- Duration: Regular season Sept. 2005 – March 2006; Playoffs; March 2006 – May 2006
- Teams: 20
- TV partner(s): Rogers TV, TVCogeco
- Finals champions: Peterborough Petes

OHL seasons
- 2004–05 2006–07

2005–06 CHL season
- League: Canadian Hockey League
- Sport: Hockey
- Duration: OHL; Sept. 2005 – March 2006; QMJHL; Sept. 2005 – March 2006; WHL; Sept. 2005 – March 2006
- Teams: 60
- TV partner(s): RDS; Rogers Sportsnet; Rogers TV; Shaw TV

The 2005–06 OHL season was the 26th season of the Ontario Hockey League. The Canadian Hockey League adopted the new playing rules and enforcement recently adopted by the National Hockey League in efforts to speed up the game, and make it more exciting for fans. Twenty teams each played 68 games. The J. Ross Robertson Cup was won by the Peterborough Petes, who defeated the London Knights in the final.

== Rule changes ==
Details of rule changes:

- Goaltender trap zone - An area behind the net established to keep goalies from playing the puck in the corners. A violation results in a delay of game penalty.
- Delay of game - Any player shooting the puck out of play from his defensive zone will be called for a 2-minute delay of game minor penalty.
- Two–line passes - two–line passes (passes which cross one's own blue line and the redline before being received) are now permitted. The center red line will be used only to determine icing.
- Shootouts - The shootout has eliminated the tie game. If a game is tied after regulation, a 5-minute, 4-on-4 sudden death period will occur. If the game is still tied after the extra frame, a shootout will occur. With the visiting team shooting first, the teams will alternate and should there be a winner following three shots (or sooner) by both teams, the game is over. However, if it remains tied, the shootout continues sudden death. The teams must go through their roster before allowing any player to take a second shot. The winning team in the shootout will receive one additional goal in the goals for stats, but all goals scored in the shootout do not affect personal stats for the players or goalies.

== Regular season ==
=== Final standings ===
Note: DIV = Division; GP = Games played; W = Wins; L = Losses; OTL = Overtime losses; SL = Shootout losses; GF = Goals for; GA = Goals against; PTS = Points; x = clinched playoff berth; y = clinched division title; z = clinched conference title

=== Eastern conference ===
| Rank | Team | DIV | GP | W | L | OTL | SL | PTS | GF | GA |
|---|---|---|---|---|---|---|---|---|---|---|
| 1 | z-Peterborough Petes | East | 68 | 47 | 16 | 2 | 3 | 99 | 269 | 199 |
| 2 | y-Brampton Battalion | Central | 68 | 44 | 21 | 1 | 2 | 91 | 275 | 222 |
| 3 | x-Barrie Colts | Central | 68 | 43 | 21 | 1 | 3 | 90 | 258 | 194 |
| 4 | x-Kingston Frontenacs | East | 68 | 37 | 24 | 4 | 3 | 81 | 258 | 237 |
| 5 | x-Sudbury Wolves | Central | 68 | 34 | 28 | 1 | 5 | 74 | 227 | 222 |
| 6 | x-Toronto St. Michael's Majors | Central | 68 | 32 | 26 | 6 | 4 | 74 | 259 | 285 |
| 7 | x-Belleville Bulls | East | 68 | 32 | 28 | 5 | 3 | 72 | 202 | 225 |
| 8 | x-Ottawa 67's | East | 68 | 29 | 31 | 5 | 3 | 66 | 240 | 244 |
| 9 | Mississauga IceDogs | Central | 68 | 21 | 40 | 5 | 2 | 49 | 192 | 300 |
| 10 | Oshawa Generals | East | 68 | 18 | 45 | 4 | 1 | 41 | 233 | 330 |

=== Western conference ===
| Rank | Team | DIV | GP | W | L | OTL | SL | PTS | GF | GA |
|---|---|---|---|---|---|---|---|---|---|---|
| 1 | z-London Knights | Midwest | 68 | 49 | 15 | 1 | 3 | 102 | 304 | 211 |
| 2 | y-Plymouth Whalers | West | 68 | 35 | 28 | 1 | 4 | 75 | 227 | 225 |
| 3 | x-Kitchener Rangers | Midwest | 68 | 47 | 19 | 1 | 1 | 96 | 255 | 165 |
| 4 | x-Guelph Storm | Midwest | 68 | 40 | 24 | 1 | 3 | 84 | 232 | 206 |
| 5 | x-Saginaw Spirit | West | 68 | 36 | 30 | 2 | 0 | 74 | 242 | 246 |
| 6 | x-Owen Sound Attack | Midwest | 68 | 32 | 29 | 4 | 3 | 71 | 239 | 239 |
| 7 | x-Windsor Spitfires | West | 68 | 32 | 29 | 3 | 4 | 71 | 247 | 253 |
| 8 | x-Sault Ste. Marie Greyhounds | West | 68 | 29 | 31 | 3 | 5 | 66 | 201 | 213 |
| 9 | Erie Otters | Midwest | 68 | 26 | 35 | 4 | 3 | 59 | 219 | 266 |
| 10 | Sarnia Sting | West | 68 | 17 | 46 | 2 | 3 | 39 | 197 | 295 |

== Scoring leaders ==
Note: GP = Games played; G = Goals; A = Assists; Pts = Points; PIM = Penalty minutes

| Player | Team | GP | G | A | Pts | PIM |
|---|---|---|---|---|---|---|
| Rob Schremp | London Knights | 57 | 57 | 88 | 145 | 74 |
| David Bolland | London Knights | 57 | 57 | 73 | 130 | 104 |
| Wojtek Wolski | Brampton Battalion | 56 | 47 | 81 | 128 | 46 |
| Dylan Hunter | London Knights | 62 | 32 | 85 | 117 | 50 |
| Evan McGrath | Kitchener Rangers | 67 | 37 | 77 | 114 | 63 |
| Justin Donati | Toronto St. Michael's Majors | 62 | 46 | 63 | 109 | 50 |
| Bryan Little | Barrie Colts | 64 | 42 | 67 | 109 | 99 |
| Peter Tsimikalis | Oshawa Generals | 64 | 29 | 70 | 99 | 69 |
| Cal O'Reilly | Windsor Spitfires | 68 | 18 | 81 | 99 | 8 |
| Bobby Ryan | Owen Sound Attack | 59 | 31 | 64 | 95 | 44 |

== Leading goaltenders ==
Note: GP = Games played; Mins = Minutes played; W = Wins; L = Losses: OTL = Overtime losses; SL = Shootout losses; GA = Goals Allowed; SO = Shutouts; GAA = Goals against average

| Player | Team | GP | Mins | W | L | OTL | SL | GA | SO | Sv% | GAA |
|---|---|---|---|---|---|---|---|---|---|---|---|
| Dan Turple | Kitchener Rangers | 57 | 3306 | 40 | 15 | 1 | 1 | 124 | 7 | .924 | 2.25 |
| Dan LaCosta | Barrie Colts | 59 | 3340 | 36 | 17 | 1 | 3 | 142 | 6 | .915 | 2.55 |
| Ryan MacDonald | Guelph Storm | 57 | 3292 | 35 | 15 | 1 | 3 | 141 | 4 | .907 | 2.57 |
| Anthony Guadagnolo | Windsor Spitfires | 48 | 2814 | 27 | 14 | 3 | 3 | 129 | 5 | .916 | 2.75 |
| Kyle Gajewski | Sault Ste. Marie Greyhounds | 64 | 3704 | 29 | 23 | 3 | 5 | 174 | 3 | .904 | 2.82 |

== Playoffs ==
Conference quarterfinals
E1 | Peterborough | 4
E8 | Ottawa | 2
E4 | Kingston | 2
E5 | Sudbury | 4
E3 | Barrie | 4
E6 | Toronto | 0
E2 | Brampton | 4
E7 | Belleville | 2
W1 | London | 4
W8 | S.S. Marie | 0
W3 | Kitchener | 1
W6 | Owen Sound | 4
W4 | Guelph | 4
W5 | Saginaw | 0
W2 | Plymouth | 4
W7 | Windsor | 3

Conference semifinals
E1 | Peterborough | 4
E5 | Sudbury | 0
E3 | Barrie | 4
E2 | Brampton | 1
W1 | London | 4
W6 | Owen Sound | 2
W4 | Guelph | 4
W2 | Plymouth | 2

Conference finals
E1 | Peterborough | 4
E3 | Barrie | 1
W1 | London | 4
W4 | Guelph | 1

Finals
E1 | Peterborough | 4
W1 | London | 0

=== Eastern conference quarterfinals ===
Peterborough (1) vs. Ottawa (8)
| Date | Away | Home |
|---|---|---|---|
| March 23 | Ottawa 3 | 4 Peterborough | 2OT |
| March 25 | Peterborough 4 | 8 Ottawa |
| March 27 | Ottawa 1 | 3 Peterborough |
| March 29 | Peterborough 3 | 4 Ottawa |
| March 31 | Ottawa 3 | 4 Peterborough | OT |
| April 2 | Peterborough 3 | 2 Ottawa |
Peterborough wins series 4–2

Barrie (3) vs. Toronto (6)
| Date | Away | Home |
|---|---|---|---|
| March 23 | Toronto 4 | 5 Barrie | OT |
| March 24 | Barrie 6 | 5 Toronto |
| March 26 | Toronto 5 | 7 Barrie |
| March 28 | Barrie 4 | 1 Toronto |
Barrie wins series 4–0

Brampton (2) vs. Belleville (7)
| Date | Away | Home |
|---|---|---|---|
| March 24 | Belleville 2 | 3 Brampton | OT |
| March 26 | Belleville 3 | 2 Brampton | OT |
| March 27 | Brampton 3 | 1 Belleville |
| March 29 | Brampton 4 | 3 Belleville | OT |
| March 31 | Belleville 3 | 2 Brampton |
| April 1 | Brampton 5 | 2 Belleville |
Brampton wins series 4–2

Kingston (4) vs. Sudbury (5)
| Date | Away | Home |
|---|---|---|
| March 24 | Sudbury 3 | 5 Kingston |
| March 25 | Sudbury 4 | 1 Kingston |
| March 28 | Kingston 0 | 2 Sudbury |
| March 29 | Kingston 2 | 5 Sudbury |
| March 31 | Sudbury 0 | 3 Kingston |
| April 2 | Kingston 0 | 4 Sudbury |
Sudbury wins series 4–2

=== Western conference quarterfinals ===
London (1) vs. Sault Ste. Marie (8)
| Date | Away | Home |
|---|---|---|---|
| March 23 | Sault Ste. Marie 1 | 6 London |
| March 24 | Sault Ste. Marie 3 | 6 London |
| March 26 | London 6 | 5 Sault Ste. Marie | OT |
| March 28 | London 5 | 4 Sault Ste. Marie | 2 OT |
London wins series 4–0

Kitchener (3) vs. Owen Sound (6)
| Date | Away | Home |
|---|---|---|---|
| March 24 | Owen Sound 3 | 2 Kitchener |
| March 25 | Kitchener 2 | 3 Owen Sound |
| March 27 | Owen Sound 3 | 4 Kitchener | 2OT |
| March 29 | Kitchener 2 | 7 Owen Sound |
| March 31 | Owen Sound 4 | 3 Kitchener |
Owen Sound wins series 4–1

Plymouth (2) vs. Windsor (7)
| Date | Away | Home |
|---|---|---|
| March 25 | Windsor 4 | 7 Plymouth |
| March 26 | Plymouth 4 | 2 Windsor |
| March 28 | Windsor 2 | 1 Plymouth |
| March 30 | Plymouth 3 | 4 Windsor |
| April 1 | Windsor 2 | 3 Plymouth |
| April 2 | Plymouth 4 | 7 Windsor |
| April 4 | Windsor 2 | 6 Plymouth |
Plymouth wins series 4–3

Guelph (4) vs. Saginaw (5)
| Date | Away | Home |
|---|---|---|
| March 24 | Saginaw 2 | 3 Guelph |
| March 27 | Guelph 4 | 1 Saginaw |
| March 28 | Saginaw 1 | 4 Guelph |
| March 30 | Guelph 4 | Saginaw 3 |
Guelph wins series 4–0

=== Eastern conference semifinals ===
Peterborough (1) vs. Sudbury (5)
| Date | Away | Home |
|---|---|---|---|
| April 6 | Sudbury 1 | 3 Peterborough |
| April 7 | Sudbury 1 | 6 Peterborough |
| April 10 | Peterborough 4 | 2 Sudbury |
| April 11 | Peterborough 4 | 3 Sudbury | OT |
Peterborough wins series 4–0

Brampton (2) vs. Barrie (3)
| Date | Away | Home |
|---|---|---|
| April 6 | Barrie 1 | 4 Brampton |
| April 7 | Brampton 1 | 4 Barrie |
| April 9 | Barrie 6 | 1 Brampton |
| April 11 | Brampton 2 | 11 Barrie |
| April 13 | Barrie 3 | 2 Brampton |
Barrie wins series 4–1

=== Western conference semifinals ===
London (1) vs. Owen Sound (6)
| Date | Away | Home |
|---|---|---|---|
| April 7 | Owen Sound 3 | 6 London |
| April 8 | London 3 | 5 Owen Sound |
| April 10 | Owen Sound 4 | 2 London |
| April 12 | London 5 | 1 Owen Sound |
| April 14 | Owen Sound 5 | 6 London | OT |
| April 15 | London 5 | 2 Owen Sound |
London wins series 4–2

Plymouth (2) vs. Guelph (4)
| Date | Away | Home |
|---|---|---|---|
| April 7 | Guelph 4 | 1 Plymouth |
| April 8 | Plymouth 2 | 3 Guelph | OT |
| April 10 | Guelph 8 | 0 Plymouth |
| April 12 | Plymouth 4 | 3 Guelph | OT |
| April 14 | Guelph 2 | 5 Plymouth |
| April 15 | Plymouth 3 | 4 Guelph |
Guelph wins series 4–2

=== Conference finals ===
Peterborough (1) vs. Barrie (3)
| Date | Away | Home |
|---|---|---|---|
| April 20 | Barrie 3 | 4 Peterborough | 3OT |
| April 22 | Peterborough 2 | 5 Barrie |
| April 24 | Barrie 4 | 5 Peterborough | OT |
| April 26 | Peterborough 6 | 5 Barrie | OT |
| April 28 | Barrie 0 | Peterborough 7 |
Peterborough wins series 4–1

London (1) vs. Guelph (4)
| Date | Away | Home |
|---|---|---|---|
| April 20 | Guelph 3 | 5 London |
| April 21 | London 1 | 7 Guelph |
| April 23 | Guelph 2 | 3 London | OT |
| April 25 | London 2 | 1 Guelph |
| April 28 | Guelph 4 | London 5 | OT |
London wins series 4–1

=== J. Ross Robertson Cup finals ===
London (W1) vs. Peterborough (E1)
| Date | Away | Home |
|---|---|---|---|
| May 5 | Peterborough 6 | 5 London | 2OT |
| May 7 | London 3 | 4 Peterborough | OT |
| May 9 | Peterborough 3 | 2 London |
| May 11 | London 3 | 4 Peterborough |
Peterborough wins series 4–0

=== J. Ross Robertson Cup Champions Roster ===
2005-06 Peterborough Petes
| Goaltenders: (Canada) 1 – David Shantz; (Canada) 34 – Trevor Cann | Defencemen: (United States) 2 – Aaron Dawson; (Canada) 3 – Mark Pawlowski; (Czech Republic) 4 – Lubomir Stach; (Canada) 5 – Bryan Young; (Canada) 7 – Trevor Hendrikx; (Canada) 18 – Craig Cescon; (Canada) 26 – Kyle Raftis; (Canada) 28 – Burke MacDonald | Wingers: (Canada) 14 – Justin Soryal; (Canada) 16 – Greg Stewart; (Canada) 17 – Zach Harnden; (Canada) 19 – Justin Caruana; (Canada) 21 – Jason McDonough; (Canada) 22 – Liam Reddox; (Sweden) 24 – Fredrik Naslund; (Canada) 25 – Jamie Tardif - C; (United States) 27 – Patrick Kaletta | Centres: (Canada) 9 – Jordan Morrison; (Canada) 11 – Jordan Staal; (Canada) 12 – Scott Cowie; (Canada) 20 – Steve Downie; (Canada) 23 – Daniel Ryder; Coach: (Canada) Dick Todd; General Manager: (Canada) Jeff Twohey |

== All-Star teams ==
=== First team ===
- Rob Schremp, Centre, London Knights
- Mike Angelidis, Left Wing, Owen Sound Attack
- Dave Bolland, Right Wing, London Knights
- Andrej Sekera, Defence, Owen Sound Attack
- Marc Staal, Defence, Sudbury Wolves
- Adam Dennis, Goaltender, London Knights
- Dave Barr, Coach, Guelph Storm

=== Second team ===
- Wojtek Wolski, Centre, Brampton Battalion
- Dylan Hunter, Left Wing, London Knights
- Ryan Callahan, Right Wing, Guelph Storm
- Ryan Parent, Defence, Guelph Storm
- Patrick McNeill, Defence, Saginaw Spirit
- Dan Turple, Goaltender, Kitchener Rangers
- Dale Hunter, Coach, London Knights

=== Third team ===
- Bryan Little, Centre, Barrie Colts
- Ryan Hamilton, Left Wing, Barrie Colts
- Mike Blunden, Right Wing, Erie Otters
- Matt Lashoff, Defence, Kitchener Rangers
- Michael Vernace, Defence, Brampton Battalion
- Kevin Lalande, Goaltender, Belleville Bulls
- Dick Todd, Coach, Peterborough Petes

== CHL Canada/Russia Series ==
In the ADT Canada-Russia Challenge:

- On November 24, the OHL All-stars defeated the Russian Selects 5–3 at Kitchener, Ontario.
- On November 28, the OHL All-stars defeated the Russian Selects 5–1 at Peterborough, Ontario.

After these two games, the OHL had an all-time record of 6–0 against the Russian Selects since the tournament began in 2003–04.

== Awards ==
| J. Ross Robertson Cup: | Peterborough Petes |
| Hamilton Spectator Trophy: | London Knights |
| Bobby Orr Trophy: | Peterborough Petes |
| Wayne Gretzky Trophy: | London Knights |
| Emms Trophy: | Brampton Battalion |
| Leyden Trophy: | Peterborough Petes |
| Holody Trophy: | London Knights |
| Bumbacco Trophy: | Plymouth Whalers |
| Red Tilson Trophy: | Wojtek Wolski, Brampton Battalion |
| Eddie Powers Memorial Trophy: | Rob Schremp, London Knights |
| Matt Leyden Trophy: | Dave Barr, Guelph Storm |
| Jim Mahon Memorial Trophy: | Dave Bolland, London Knights |
| Max Kaminsky Trophy: | Andrej Sekera, Owen Sound Attack |
| OHL Goaltender of the Year: | Adam Dennis, London Knights |
| Jack Ferguson Award: | Steven Stamkos, Sarnia Sting |
| Dave Pinkney Trophy: | Dan Turple & Mark Packwood, Kitchener Rangers |
| OHL Executive of the Year: | Craig Goslin, Saginaw Spirit |
| Bill Long Award: | Jeff Twohey, Peterborough Petes |
| Emms Family Award: | John Tavares, Oshawa Generals |
| F.W. "Dinty" Moore Trophy: | Ryan Daniels, Saginaw Spirit |
| Dan Snyder Memorial Trophy: | Mike Angelidis, Owen Sound Attack |
| William Hanley Trophy: | Wojtek Wolski, Brampton Battalion |
| Leo Lalonde Memorial Trophy: | Ryan Callahan, Guelph Storm |
| Bobby Smith Trophy: | Danny Battochio, Ottawa 67's |
| Roger Neilson Memorial Award: | Danny Battochio, Ottawa 67's |
| Ivan Tennant Memorial Award: | Joe Pleckaitis, Ottawa 67's |
| Tim Adams Memorial Trophy: | Steven Stamkos, Markham Waxers |
| Wayne Gretzky 99 Award: | Daniel Ryder, Peterborough Petes |

== 2006 OHL Priority Selection ==
On May 6, 2006, the OHL conducted the 2006 Ontario Hockey League Priority Selection. The Sarnia Sting held the first overall pick in the draft, and selected Steven Stamkos from the Markham Waxers. Stamkos was awarded the Jack Ferguson Award, awarded to the top pick in the draft.

Below are the players who were selected in the first round of the 2006 Ontario Hockey League Priority Selection.

| # | Player | Nationality | OHL team | Hometown | Minor team |
|---|---|---|---|---|---|
| 1 | Steven Stamkos (C) | Canada | Sarnia Sting | Unionville, Ontario | Markham Waxers |
| 2 | Michael Del Zotto (D) | Canada | Oshawa Generals | Stouffville, Ontario | Markham Waxers |
| 3 | Alex Pietrangelo (D) | Canada | Mississauga IceDogs | King City, Ontario | Toronto Jr. Canadiens |
| 4 | Mitch Gaulton (D) | Canada | Erie Otters | Grimsby, Ontario | Toronto Red Wings |
| 5 | James Livingston (RW) | Canada | Sault Ste. Marie Greyhounds | Newmarket, Ontario | York-Simcoe Express |
| 6 | Tyler Cuma (D) | Canada | Ottawa 67's | Bowmanville, Ontario | Mississauga Reps |
| 7 | Greg Nemisz (RW) | Canada | Windsor Spitfires | Courtice, Ontario | Clarington Toros |
| 8 | Michael D'Orazio (D) | Canada | Owen Sound Attack | Richmond Hill, Ontario | Toronto Jr. Canadiens |
| 9 | Shawn Lalonde (D) | Canada | Belleville Bulls | Orleans, Ontario | Cumberland Barons |
| 10 | Dylan O'Neil (C) | Canada | Toronto St. Michael's Majors | Ajax, Ontario | Markham Waxers |
| 11 | Jared Staal (RW) | Canada | Sudbury Wolves | Thunder Bay, Ontario | Thunder Bay Kings |
| 12 | Nick Crawford (D) | Canada | Saginaw Spirit | Caledon, Ontario | Don Mills Flyers |
| 13 | Vern Cooper (LW) | Canada | Plymouth Whalers | Sudbury, Ontario | Sudbury Nickel Capital Wolves |
| 14 | Josh Brittain (LW) | Canada | Kingston Frontenacs | Milton, Ontario | Toronto Jr. Canadiens |
| 15 | Anthony Nigro (C) | Canada | Guelph Storm | Woodbridge, Ontario | Don Mills Flyers |
| 16 | Stefan Della Rovere (LW) | Canada | Barrie Colts | Maple, Ontario | Toronto Jr. Canadiens |
| 17 | Cody Hodgson (C) | Canada | Brampton Battalion | Markham, Ontario | Markham Waxers |
| 18 | Nazem Kadri (C) | Canada | Kitchener Rangers | London, Ontario | London Jr. Knights |
| 19 | Zach Bogosian (D) | United States | Peterborough Petes | Massena, New York | Cushing Academy Penguins |
| 20 | Philip McRae (C) | United States | London Knights | Chesterfield, Missouri | USA U17 |

== 2006 CHL Import Draft ==
On June 28, 2006, the Canadian Hockey League conducted the 2006 CHL Import Draft, in which teams in all three CHL leagues participate in. The Toronto St. Michael's Majors held the first pick in the draft by a team in the OHL, and selected Kaspars Daugavins from Latvia with their selection.

Below are the players who were selected in the first round by Ontario Hockey League teams in the 2006 CHL Import Draft.

| # | Player | Nationality | OHL team | Hometown | Minor team |
|---|---|---|---|---|---|
| 3 | Kaspars Daugavins (LW) | Latvia | Toronto St. Michael's Majors | Riga, Latvia | Riga 2000 |
| 6 | Tomas Kana (LW) | Czech Republic | Owen Sound Attack | Opava, Czech Republic | Vitkovice Steel HC |
| 9 | Branislav Rehus (RW) | Slovakia | Peterborough Petes | Malacky, Slovakia | Vitkovice Ostrave Jr. |
| 12 | Stanislav Polodna (RW) | Czech Republic | Erie Otters | Milevsko, Czech Republic | Ceske Budejovice Jr. |
| 15 | Yannick Weber (D) | Switzerland | Kitchener Rangers | Meikirch, Switzerland | Bern Future SC Jr. |
| 18 | Marek Biro (D) | Slovakia | Windsor Spitfires | Trnava, Slovakia | Trnava Jr. |
| 21 | Lukas Flueler (G) | Switzerland | Ottawa 67's | Kloten, Switzerland | Kloten Flyers |
| 24 | Ziga Pance (LW) | Slovenia | Oshawa Generals | Ljubljana, Slovenia | Olimpija ZM |
| 27 | Michal Neuvirth (G) | Czech Republic | Plymouth Whalers | Ústí nad Labem, Czech Republic | Sparta Praha Jr. |
| 30 | Kriss Grudmanis (D) | Latvia | Toronto St. Michael's Majors | Riga, Latvia | Riga 2000 |
| 33 | Jan Mursak (RW) | Slovenia | Saginaw Spirit | Maribor, Slovenia | Ceske Budejovice Jr. |
| 36 | Tomas Zaborsky (LW) | Slovakia | Saginaw Spirit | Trenčín, Slovakia | Trencin Jr. |
| 39 | Jozef Sladok (D) | Slovakia | Plymouth Whalers | Zvolen, Slovakia | Zvolen Jr. |
| 42 | Robert Nyholm (LW) | Finland | Kingston Frontenacs | Jakobstad, Finland | HIFK Helsinki Jr. |
| 45 | Arturs Ozolins (C) | Latvia | Guelph Storm | Riga, Latvia | Riga 20 SK |
| 48 | Arturs Kulda (D) | Latvia | Peterborough Petes | Riga, Latvia | Moscow HC CSKA-2 |
| 51 | Patrik Lusnak (RW) | Slovakia | Sudbury Wolves | Piešťany, Slovakia | Skalica Jr. |
| 54 | No selection made | | Kitchener Rangers | | |
| 56 | Alexander Ilyin (D) | Russia | Mississauga IceDogs | Tver, Russia | HC Tver |
| 58 | Adam Hasani (LW) | Switzerland | London Knights | Fribourg, Switzerland | Fribourg Jr.r. |

== 2006 NHL entry draft ==
On June 24, 2006, the National Hockey League conducted the 2006 NHL entry draft held at General Motors Place in Vancouver, British Columbia. In total, 29 players from the Ontario Hockey League were selected in the draft. Jordan Staal of the Peterborough Petes was the first player from the OHL to be selected, as he was taken with the second overall pick by the Pittsburgh Penguins.

Below are the players selected from OHL teams at the NHL Entry Draft.

| Round | # | Player | Nationality | NHL team | Hometown | OHL team |
|---|---|---|---|---|---|---|
| 1 | 2 | Jordan Staal (C) | Canada | Pittsburgh Penguins | Thunder Bay, Ontario | Peterborough Petes |
| 1 | 12 | Bryan Little (C) | Canada | Atlanta Thrashers | Cambridge, Ontario | Barrie Colts |
| 1 | 18 | Chris Stewart (RW) | Canada | Colorado Avalanche | Scarborough, Ontario | Kingston Frontenacs |
| 1 | 21 | Bobby Sanguinetti (D) | United States | New York Rangers | Lumberton, New Jersey | Owen Sound Attack |
| 1 | 28 | Nick Foligno (C) | United States | Ottawa Senators | Buffalo, New York | Sudbury Wolves |
| 1 | 30 | Matt Corrente (D) | Canada | New Jersey Devils | Mississauga, Ontario | Saginaw Spirit |
| 2 | 36 | Jamie McGinn (LW) | Canada | San Jose Sharks | Fergus, Ontario | Ottawa 67's |
| 2 | 41 | Cory Emmerton (C) | Canada | Detroit Red Wings | St. Thomas, Ontario | Kingston Frontenacs |
| 2 | 47 | Shawn Matthias (C) | Canada | Detroit Red Wings | Mississauga, Ontario | Belleville Bulls |
| 2 | 57 | Mike Weber (D) | United States | Buffalo Sabres | Pittsburgh, Pennsylvania | Windsor Spitfires |
| 3 | 69 | Steve Mason (G) | Canada | Columbus Blue Jackets | Oakville, Ontario | London Knights |
| 3 | 72 | Cal Clutterbuck (RW) | Canada | Minnesota Wild | Welland, Ontario | Oshawa Generals |
| 3 | 75 | Theo Peckham (D) | Canada | Edmonton Oilers | Richmond Hill, Ontario | Owen Sound Attack |
| 3 | 83 | John de Gray (D) | Canada | Anaheim Ducks | Markham, Ontario | Brampton Battalion |
| 3 | 85 | Tom Sestito (LW) | United States | Columbus Blue Jackets | Rome, New York | Plymouth Whalers |
| 3 | 87 | John Armstrong (C) | Canada | Calgary Flames | Unionville, Ontario | Plymouth Whalers |
| 3 | 90 | Aaron Snow (LW) | Canada | Dallas Stars | Windsor, Ontario | Brampton Battalion |
| 3 | 93 | Harrison Reed (RW) | Canada | Carolina Hurricanes | Holland Landing, Ontario | Sarnia Sting |
| 4 | 95 | Ben Shutron (D) | Canada | Chicago Blackhawks | Orleans, Ontario | Kingston Frontenacs |
| 4 | 97 | Oskar Osala (LW) | Finland | Washington Capitals | Vaasa, Finland | Mississauga IceDogs |
| 4 | 98 | James DeLory (D) | Canada | San Jose Sharks | Newmarket, Ontario | Oshawa Generals |
| 4 | 103 | Michael Caruso (D) | Canada | Florida Panthers | Mississauga, Ontario | Guelph Storm |
| 4 | 112 | Matt Beleskey (LW) | Canada | Anaheim Ducks | Midhurst, Ontario | Belleville Bulls |
| 4 | 122 | Luke Lynes (LW) | United States | Washington Capitals | Ellicott City, Maryland | Brampton Battalion |
| 4 | 123 | Bobby Hughes (C) | Canada | Carolina Hurricanes | Stouffville, Ontario | Kingston Frontenacs |
| 5 | 133 | Bryan Pitton (G) | Canada | Edmonton Oilers | Brampton, Ontario | Brampton Battalion |
| 5 | 151 | Ryan Daniels (G) | Canada | Ottawa Senators | Pickering, Ontario | Saginaw Spirit |
| 6 | 155 | Peter Aston (D) | Canada | Florida Panthers | Toronto, Ontario | Windsor Spitfires |
| 7 | 187 | Devin DiDiomete (LW) | Canada | Calgary Flames | Stratford, Ontario | Sudbury Wolves |

== See also ==
- List of OHA Junior A standings
- List of OHL seasons
- 2006 NHL entry draft
- 2006 Memorial Cup
- 2005 in sports
- 2006 in sports

| Preceded by 2004–05 OHL season | OHL seasons | Succeeded by 2006–07 OHL season |
