= 2004–05 OHL season =

- League: Ontario Hockey League
- Sport: Hockey
- Duration: Regular season Sept. 2004 – March 2005; Playoffs; March 2005 – May 2005
- Teams: 20
- TV partner(s): Rogers TV, TVCogeco

Draft
- Top draft pick: John Hughes
- Picked by: Belleville Bulls

Regular season
- Hamilton Spectator Trophy: London Knights (2)
- Season MVP: Corey Perry (London Knights)
- Top scorer: Corey Perry (London Knights)

Playoffs
- Playoffs MVP: Corey Perry (Knights)
- Finals champions: London Knights
- Runners-up: Ottawa 67's

OHL seasons
- 2003–04 2005–06

2004–05 CHL season
- League: Canadian Hockey League
- Sport: Hockey
- Duration: OHL; Sept. 2004 – March 2005; QMJHL; Sept. 2004 – March 2005; WHL; Sept. 2004 – March 2005
- Teams: 60
- TV partner(s): RDS; Rogers Sportsnet; Rogers TV; Shaw TV
- Season MVP: Sidney Crosby (Rimouski Océanic) (QMJHL)
- Top scorer: Sidney Crosby (Rimouski Océanic) (QMJHL)

Memorial Cup
- Finals champions: London Knights (OHL) (1st title)
- Runners-up: Rimouski Océanic (QMJHL)

The 2004–05 OHL season was the 25th season of the Ontario Hockey League. The OHL inaugurated two awards for scholastic achievement, the Roger Neilson Memorial Award and the Ivan Tennant Memorial Award. Twenty teams each played 68 games. The London Knights set a Canadian Hockey League record, being undefeated in 31 consecutive games (29-0-2) to start the season. On March 11, 2005, the league announced OHL Live Stream, a new streaming service to be developed over a three year period. The J. Ross Robertson Cup was won by the London Knights, defeating the Ottawa 67's.

== Regular season ==
=== Final standings ===
Note: DIV = Division; GP = Games played; W = Wins; L = Losses; T = Ties; OTL = Overtime losses; GF = Goals for; GA = Goals against; PTS = Points; x = clinched playoff berth; y = clinched division title; z = clinched conference title

=== Eastern conference ===
Rank	Team	DIV	GP	W	L	T	OTL	PTS	GF	GA
1	z-Mississauga IceDogs	Central	68	34	21	12	1	81	207	172
2	y-Peterborough Petes	East	68	34	21	9	4	81	238	215
3	x-Barrie Colts	Central	68	33	23	9	3	78	232	210
4	x-Brampton Battalion	Central	68	33	24	9	2	77	214	200
5	x-Sudbury Wolves	Central	68	32	23	6	7	77	201	185
6	x-Ottawa 67's	East	68	34	26	7	1	76	244	210
7	x-Belleville Bulls	East	68	29	29	6	4	68	176	208
8	x-Toronto St. Michael's Majors	Central	68	29	30	6	3	67	177	202
9	Kingston Frontenacs	East	68	28	33	4	3	63	219	242
10	Oshawa Generals	East	68	15	48	3	2	35	173	289

=== Western conference ===
Rank	Team	DIV	GP	W	L	T	OTL	PTS	GF	GA
1	z-London Knights	Midwest	68	59	7	2	0	120	310	125
2	y-Sault Ste. Marie Greyhounds	West	68	33	25	9	1	76	210	188
3	x-Owen Sound Attack	Midwest	68	40	18	7	3	90	245	187
4	x-Kitchener Rangers	Midwest	68	35	20	9	4	83	235	187
5	x-Erie Otters	Midwest	68	31	26	6	5	73	186	207
6	x-Plymouth Whalers	West	68	30	29	6	3	69	198	204
7	x-Windsor Spitfires	West	68	26	29	6	7	65	223	253
8	x-Guelph Storm	Midwest	68	23	34	10	1	57	167	189
9	Saginaw Spirit	West	68	18	42	4	4	44	150	260
10	Sarnia Sting	West	68	16	41	6	5	43	156	228

=== Scoring leaders ===
Player	Team	GP	G	A	Pts	PIM
Corey Perry	London Knights	60	47	83	130	117
Dylan Hunter	London Knights	67	31	73	104	64
Brad Richardson	Owen Sound Attack	68	41	56	97	60
Rob Schremp	London Knights	62	41	49	90	54
Patrick O'Sullivan	Mississauga IceDogs	57	31	59	90	63
Bobby Ryan	Owen Sound Attack	62	37	52	89	51
Evan McGrath	Kitchener Rangers	67	37	52	89	51
Rob Hisey	Barrie/Erie	66	29	57	86	81
Dave Bolland	London Knights	66	34	51	85	97
Liam Reddox	Peterborough Petes	68	36	46	82	36

== Playoffs ==
Conference quarterfinals
E1	Mississauga	1
E8	Toronto	4
E2	Peterborough	4
E7	Belleville	1
E3	Barrie	2
E6	Ottawa	4
E4	Brampton	2
E5	Sudbury	4
W1	London	4
W8	Guelph	0
W2	S.S. Marie	3
W7	Windsor	4
W3	Owen Sound	4
W6	Plymouth	0
W4	Kitchener	4
W5	Erie	2

Conference semifinals
E8	Toronto	1
E2	Peterborough	4
E6	Ottawa	4
E5	Sudbury	2
W1	London	4
W7	Windsor	0
W3	Owen Sound	0
W4	Kitchener	4

Conference finals
E2	Peterborough	0
E6	Ottawa	4
W1	London	4
W4	Kitchener	1

Finals
E6	Ottawa	1
W1	London	4

=== Conference quarterfinals ===
==== Eastern conference ====
Mississauga (1) vs. Toronto (8)
Date	Away	Home
March 25	Toronto 3	1 Mississauga
March 27	Mississauga 6	2 Toronto
March 29	Toronto 3	2 Mississauga
March 31	Mississauga 1	3 Toronto
April 3	Toronto 2	1 Mississauga
Toronto wins series 4–1

Barrie (3) vs. Ottawa (6)
Date	Away	Home
March 25	Ottawa 5	4 Barrie
March 26	Ottawa 1	4 Barrie
March 30	Barrie 2	3 Ottawa
April 1	Barrie 4	6 Ottawa
April 3	Ottawa 2	3 Barrie
April 4	Barrie 2	8 Ottawa
Ottawa wins series 4–2

Peterborough (2) vs. Belleville (7)
Date	Away	Home	
March 24	Belleville 0	5 Peterborough	
March 26	Peterborough 3	2 Belleville	
March 27	Belleville 1	5 Peterborough	
March 29	Peterborough 3	4 Belleville	OT
March 31	Belleville 1	4 Peterborough	
Peterborough wins series 4–1

Brampton (4) vs. Sudbury (5)
Date	Away	Home	
March 24	Sudbury 3	2 Brampton	OT
March 25	Brampton 1	4 Sudbury	
March 27	Sudbury 3	4 Brampton	
March 30	Brampton 1	2 Sudbury	
April 1	Sudbury 2	4 Brampton	
April 3	Brampton 4	5 Sudbury	2OT
Sudbury wins series 4–2

==== Western conference ====
London (1) vs. Guelph (8)
Date	Away	Home
March 24	Guelph 2	3 London
March 25	London 2	1 Guelph
March 28	Guelph 1	5 London
March 29	London 5	2 Guelph
London wins series 4–0

Owen Sound (3) vs. Plymouth (6)
Date	Away	Home
March 25	Plymouth 0	1 Owen Sound
March 26	Owen Sound 6	1 Plymouth
March 29	Plymouth 0	5 Owen Sound
March 31	Owen Sound 7	2 Plymouth
Owen Sound wins series 4–0

Sault Ste. Marie (2) vs. Windsor (7)
Date	Away	Home	
March 25	Windsor 0	5 Sault Ste. Marie	
March 26	Windsor 1	3 Sault Ste. Marie	
March 30	Sault Ste. Marie 2	1 Windsor	
March 31	Sault Ste. Marie 3	4 Windsor	OT
April 2	Windsor 6	5 Sault Ste. Marie	
April 3	Sault Ste. Marie 3	4 Windsor	
April 5	Windsor 3	2 Sault Ste. Marie	2OT
Windsor wins series 4–3

Kitchener (4) vs. Erie (5)
Date	Away	Home	
March 25	Erie 2	1 Kitchener	
March 26	Kitchener 2	4 Erie	
March 28	Erie 3	4 Kitchener	OT
March 30	Kitchener 3	2 Erie	OT
April 1	Erie 2	5 Kitchener	
April 2	Kitchener 3	2 Erie	
Kitchener wins series 4–2

=== Conference semifinals ===
Eastern conference

Peterborough (2) vs. Toronto (8)
Date	Away	Home	
April 7	Toronto 4	5 Peterborough	OT
April 8	Peterborough 6	8 Toronto	
April 10	Toronto 1	2 Peterborough	OT
April 12	Peterborough 6	3 Toronto	
April 14	Toronto 2	3 Peterborough	OT
Peterborough wins series 4–1

Sudbury (5) vs. Ottawa (6)
Date	Away	Home	
April 7	Ottawa 3	2 Sudbury	
April 9	Ottawa 2	3 Sudbury	OT
April 11	Sudbury 2	6 Ottawa	
April 13	Sudbury 2	5 Ottawa	
April 15	Ottawa 2	6 Sudbury	
April 17	Sudbury 4	7 Ottawa	
Ottawa wins series 4–2

Western conference

London (1) vs. Windsor (7)
Date	Away	Home
April 7	Windsor 0	8 London
April 8	London 5	3 Windsor
April 10	Windsor 1	9 London
April 13	London 2	1 Windsor
London wins series 4–0

Owen Sound (3) vs. Kitchener (4)
Date	Away	Home	
April 6	Kitchener 2	1 Owen Sound	
April 8	Owen Sound 0	3 Kitchener	
April 10	Kitchener 6	5 Owen Sound	OT
April 12	Owen Sound 3	5 Kitchener	
Kitchener wins series 4–0

=== Conference finals ===
Eastern conference

Peterborough (2) vs. Ottawa (6)
Date	Away	Home	
April 21	Ottawa 3	2 Peterborough	OT
April 23	Peterborough 0	3 Ottawa	
April 25	Ottawa 4	3 Peterborough	
April 27	Peterborough 2	3 Ottawa	OT
Ottawa wins series 4–0

Western conference

London (1) vs. Kitchener (4)
Date	Away	Home	
April 21	Kitchener 2	3 London	
April 23	London 1	3 Kitchener	
April 25	Kitchener 1	6 London	
April 27	London 5	4 Kitchener	OT
April 29	Kitchener 0	6 London	
London wins series 4–1

=== J. Ross Robertson Cup finals ===
London vs. Ottawa
Date	Away	Home
May 6	Ottawa 2	4 London
May 8	Ottawa 6	3 London
May 10	London 5	4 Ottawa
May 12	London 4	1 Ottawa
May 14	Ottawa 2	6 London
London wins series 4–1

=== J. Ross Robertson Cup Champions Roster ===
2004-05 London Knights
Goaltenders: (Canada) 28 – Adam Dennis; (United States) 37 – Gerald Coleman	Defencemen: (Canada) 3 – Marc Methot; (Canada) 4 – Matt McCready; (Canada) 16 – Steve Ferry; (Canada) 25 – Danny Syvret - C; (Canada) 26 – Scott Aarssen; (Canada) 27 – Ryan Martinelli; (Canada) 52 – Jeff Whitfield; (Canada) 55 – Daniel Girardi; (Canada) 74 – Bryan Rodney	Wingers: (Canada) 10 – Josh Beaulieu; (Canada) 11 – Trevor Kell; (Canada) 12 – Kole Bryce; (Canada) 17 – Robbie Drummond; (Canada) 23 – Kelly Thomson; (Canada) 33 – Brandon Prust; (Canada) 71 – Harrison Reed; (Canada) 79 – Dylan Hunter; (Canada) 87 – Adam Perry; (Canada) 91 – David Bolland; (Canada) 94 – Corey Perry	Centres: (United States) 7 – Drew Larman; (United States) 44 – Rob Schremp; (United States) 49 – Danny Fritsche; (Canada) 57 – Jordan Foreman; Coach: (Canada) Dale Hunter; General Manager: (Canada) Mark Hunter

== All-Star teams ==
=== First team ===
- Jeff Carter, Centre, Sault Ste. Marie Greyhounds
- Dylan Hunter, Left Wing, London Knights
- Corey Perry, Right Wing, London Knights
- Danny Syvret, Defence, London Knights
- Andre Benoit, Defence, Kitchener Rangers
- Michael Ouzas, Goaltender, Mississauga IceDogs
- Dale Hunter, Coach, London Knights

=== Second team ===
- Mike Richards, Centre, Kitchener Rangers
- Benoit Pouliot, Left Wing, Sudbury Wolves
- Bobby Ryan, Right Wing, Owen Sound Attack
- Jordan Smith, Defence, Sault Ste. Marie Greyhounds
- Kyle Quincey, Defence, Mississauga IceDogs
- Adam Dennis, Goaltender, London Knights
- Dick Todd, Coach, Peterborough Petes

=== Third team ===
- Brad Richardson, Centre, Owen Sound Attack
- Liam Reddox, Left Wing, Peterborough Petes
- Ryan Callahan, Right Wing, Guelph Storm
- Nathan McIver, Defence, Toronto St. Michael's Majors
- Mark Flood, Defence, Peterborough Petes
- Gerald Coleman, Goaltender, London Knights
- Mike Stothers, Coach, Owen Sound Attack

== CHL Canada/Russia Series ==
In the ADT Canada-Russia Challenge:

- On November 25, the OHL All-stars defeated the Russian Selects 3–1 at Barrie, Ontario.
- On November 28, the OHL All-stars defeated the Russian Selects 5–2 at Mississauga, Ontario.

After these two games, OHL had an all-time record of 4–0 against the Russian Selects since the tournament began in 2003–04.

== Awards ==
J. Ross Robertson Cup:	London Knights
Hamilton Spectator Trophy:	London Knights
Bobby Orr Trophy:	Ottawa 67's
Wayne Gretzky Trophy:	London Knights
Leyden Trophy:	Peterborough Petes
Emms Trophy:	Mississauga IceDogs
Holody Trophy:	London Knights
Bumbacco Trophy:	Sault Ste. Marie Greyhounds
Red Tilson Trophy:	Corey Perry, London Knights
Eddie Powers Memorial Trophy:	Corey Perry, London Knights
Matt Leyden Trophy:	Dale Hunter, London Knights
Jim Mahon Memorial Trophy:	Corey Perry, London Knights
Max Kaminsky Trophy:	Danny Syvret, London Knights
OHL Goaltender of the Year:	Michael Ouzas, Mississauga IceDogs
Jack Ferguson Award:	John Tavares, Oshawa Generals
Dave Pinkney Trophy:	Gerald Coleman and Adam Dennis, London Knights
OHL Executive of the Year:	Mike Futa, Owen Sound Attack
Bill Long Award:	Bert Templeton, posthumous honour
Emms Family Award:	Benoit Pouliot, Sudbury Wolves
F. W. "Dinty" Moore Trophy:	Kyle Gajewski, Sault Ste. Marie Greyhounds
Dan Snyder Memorial Trophy:	Jeff MacDougald, Peterborough Petes
William Hanley Trophy:	Jeff Carter, Sault Ste. Marie Greyhounds
Leo Lalonde Memorial Trophy:	Andre Benoit, Kitchener Rangers
Bobby Smith Trophy:	Richard Clune, Sarnia Sting
Roger Neilson Memorial Award:	Danny Battochio, Ottawa 67's
Ivan Tennant Memorial Award:	Matt Pelech, Sarnia Sting
Tim Adams Memorial Trophy:	Sam Gagner, Toronto Marlies
Wayne Gretzky 99 Award:	Corey Perry, London Knights

== London Knights' 2004–05 undefeated streak ==
In the 2004–05 season the London Knights broke an OHL record, going 28 games in a row without a loss (27–0–1). They subsequently broke the CHL record of 29 games (held by the 1978–79 Brandon Wheat Kings, who went 25–0–4 during their streak), with a 0–0 tie with the Guelph Storm on December 10, 2004, giving them a record of 28–0–2. The streak ended at 31 games after a 5–2 loss to the Sudbury Wolves on December 17.

Game #	Date	Score	Record	Location
1	September 24, 2004	London 4–3 Kitchener	1–0–0–0	Kitchener
2	September 26, 2004	London 5–2 Kitchener	2–0–0–0	London
3	September 30, 2004	London 2–1 Windsor	3–0–0–0	Windsor
4	October 1, 2004	London 5–4 Plymouth (OT)	4–0–0–0	London
5	October 2, 2004	London 3–2 Saginaw	5–0–0–0	Saginaw
6	October 8, 2004	London 8–0 Windsor	6–0–0–0	London
7	October 9, 2004	London 6–1 Sarnia	7–0–0–0	Sarnia
8	October 10, 2004	London 6–3 Sault Ste. Marie	8–0–0–0	Sault Ste. Marie
9	October 15, 2004	London 5–2 Owen Sound	9–0–0–0	London
10	October 16, 2004	London 8–3 Sault Ste. Marie	10–0–0–0	London
11	October 22, 2004	London 3–3 Mississauga	10–0–1–0	London
12	October 23, 2004	London 5–2 Owen Sound	11–0–1–0	Owen Sound
13	October 24, 2004	London 4–2 Guelph	12–0–1–0	Guelph
14	October 29, 2004	London 3–1 Saginaw	13–0–1–0	London
15	October 30, 2004	London 4–1 Erie	14–0–1–0	London
16	November 4, 2004	London 3–2 Guelph (OT)	15–0–1–0	London
17	November 5, 2004	London 5–3 Barrie	16–0–1–0	London
18	November 7, 2004	London 4–0 Toronto	17–0–1–0	Toronto
19	November 10, 2004	London 6–1 Mississauga	18–0–1–0	Mississauga
20	November 12, 2004	London 8–2 Belleville	19–0–1–0	London
21	November 13, 2004	London 3–1 Erie	20–0–1–0	Erie
22	November 19, 2004	London 5–3 Ottawa	21–0–1–0	London
23	November 21, 2004	London 4–2 Sault Ste. Marie	22–0–1–0	London
24	November 26, 2004	London 4–2 Plymouth	23–0–1–0	London
25	November 27, 2004	London 4–2 Barrie	24–0–1–0*	Barrie
26	November 28, 2004	London 3–0 Sudbury	25–0–1–0**	Sudbury
27	December 3, 2004	London 4–3 Windsor	26–0–1–0	London
28	December 4, 2004	London 5–1 Erie	27–0–1–0	Erie
29	December 8, 2004	London 5–3 Kitchener	28–0–1–0***	Kitchener
30	December 10, 2004	London 0–0 Guelph	28–0–2–0****	London
31	December 12, 2004	London 4–3 Kitchener (OT)	29–0–2–0	London

*Tied OHL record previously set by Kitchener in 1983–84
**Broke OHL record previously set by Kitchener in 1983–84
***Tied CHL record previously set by Brandon in 1978–79
****Broke CHL record previously set by Brandon in 1978–79

== 2005 OHL Priority Selection ==
On May 7, 2005, the OHL conducted the 2005 Ontario Hockey League Priority Selection. The Oshawa Generals held the first overall pick in the draft, and selected John Tavares from the Toronto Marlboros. Tavares was awarded the Jack Ferguson Award, awarded to the top pick in the draft.

Below are the players who were selected in the first round of the 2005 Ontario Hockey League Priority Selection.

#	Player	Nationality	OHL Team	Hometown	Minor Team
1	John Tavares (C)	Canada	Oshawa Generals	Oakville, Ontario	Toronto Marlboros
2	Mark Katic (D)	Canada	Sarnia Sting	South Porcupine, Ontario	Timmins Majors
3	Zack Torquato (C)	Canada	Saginaw Spirit	Sault Ste. Marie, Ontario	Stratford Warriors
4	Luke Pither (C)	Canada	Kingston Frontenacs	Blackstock, Ontario	Clarington Toros
5	Drew Doughty (D)	Canada	Guelph Storm	London, Ontario	London Jr. Knights
6	Akim Aliu (D)	Canada	Windsor Spitfires	Toronto, Ontario	Toronto Marlboros
7	Brendan Smith (D)	Canada	Toronto St. Michael's Majors	Etibicoke, Ontario	Toronto Marlboros
8	Bryan Cameron (RW)	Canada	Belleville Bulls	Brampton, Ontario	Toronto Marlboros
9	Nicholas Petrecki (D)	United States	Plymouth Whalers	Clifton Park, New York	Capital District Selects
10	Anthony Peluso (RW)	Canada	Erie Otters	King City, Ontario	Richmond Hill Stars
11	Jake Muzzin (D)	Canada	Sault Ste. Marie Greyhounds	Woodstock, Ontario	Brantford 99'ers
12	Logan Couture (C)	Canada	Ottawa 67's	Lucan, Ontario	St. Thomas Stars
13	Brett Parnham (C)	Canada	Sudbury Wolves	Orillia, Ontario	Huntsville Muskoka Otters
14	Matt Smyth (LW)	United States	Brampton Battalion	Orlando, Florida	Markham Majors
15	Blake Parlett (D)	Canada	Barrie Colts	Bracebridge, Ontario	Huntsville Muskoka Otters
16	Zach Harnden (RW)	Canada	Peterborough Petes	Thunder Bay, Ontario	Thunder Bay Kings
17	Jordan Skellett (LW)	Canada	Mississauga IceDogs	London, Ontario	London Jr. Knights
18	Michael Pelech (C)	Canada	Kitchener Rangers	York, Ontario	St. Michael's Buzzers
19	Josh Bailey (C)	Canada	Owen Sound Attack	Bowmanville, Ontario	Clarington Toros
20	Corey Syvret (D)	Canada	London Knights	Millgrove, Ontario	Cambridge Winter Hawks

== 2005 CHL Import Draft ==
On June 29, 2005, the Canadian Hockey League conducted the 2005 CHL Import Draft, in which teams in all three CHL leagues participate in. The Ottawa 67's held the first pick in the draft by a team in the OHL, and selected Jakub Vojta from the Czech Republic with their selection.

Below are the players who were selected in the first round by Ontario Hockey League teams in the 2005 CHL Import Draft.

#	Player	Nationality	OHL Team	Hometown	Minor Team
1	Jakub Vojta (D)	Czech Republic	Ottawa 67's	Ústí nad Labem, Czech Republic	Sparta Praha Jr.
4	Tomas Pospisil (RW)	Czech Republic	Sarnia Sting	Šumperk, Czech Republic	Ocelari Trinec
7	Marek Polak (LW)	Czech Republic	Sudbury Wolves	Havířov, Czech Republic	Trinec HC Zelezarny Jr.
10	Marek Bartanus (LW)	Slovakia	Owen Sound Attack	Liptovský Mikuláš, Slovakia	HC Košice
13	David Kuchejda (LW)	Czech Republic	Sault Ste. Marie Greyhounds	Opava, Czech Republic	HC Ceske Budejovice Jr.
16	Oskar Osala (LW)	Finland	Mississauga IceDogs	Vaasa, Finland	Sport Vaasa
19	Fredrik Naslund (LW)	Sweden	Peterborough Petes	Bromma, Sweden	Vasteras VIK HK
22	Erik Caladi (RW)	Slovakia	Belleville Bulls	Nitra, Slovakia	HK Nitra Jr.
25	Ondrej Otcenas (C)	Slovakia	Plymouth Whalers	Piešťany, Slovakia	Trencin Jr.
28	Ivan Maximkin (D)	Russia	Erie Otters	Balakovo, Russia	Togliatti Lada-2
31	Jiri Tlusty (LW)	Czech Republic	Sault Ste. Marie Greyhounds	Slaný, Czech Republic	Kladno Jr.
34	Stefan Grauwiler (G)	Switzerland	Oshawa Generals	Zürich, Switzerland	ZSC Lions Jr.
37	Anton Hedman (RW)	Sweden	Sudbury Wolves	Stockholm, Sweden	Djurgarden IF Jr.
40	Michal Klejna (C)	Slovakia	Brampton Battalion	Bratislava, Slovakia	Pardubice Jr.
43	Tibor Radulay (RW)	Slovakia	Ottawa 67's	Trenčín, Slovakia	Trencin Jr.
46	Marek Horsky (C)	Slovakia	Toronto St. Michael's Majors	Bratislava, Slovakia	Skalica Jr.
49	Sebastian Dahm (G)	Denmark	Belleville Bulls	Copenhagen, Denmark	Malmo IF Redhawks Jr.
52	No selection made		Kitchener Rangers		
55	Tomas Marcinko (C)	Slovakia	Barrie Colts	Poprad, Slovakia	Kosice Jr.
57	Sergei Kostitsyn (LW)	Belarus	London Knights	Novopolotsk, Belarus	Gomel HC

== See also ==
- List of OHA Junior A standings
- List of OHL seasons
- 2005 Memorial Cup
- 2005 NHL entry draft
- 2004 in sports
- 2005 in sports

Preceded by 2003–04 OHL season	OHL seasons	Succeeded by 2005–06 OHL season
