= Matt Corrente =

Canadian ice hockey player (born 1988)

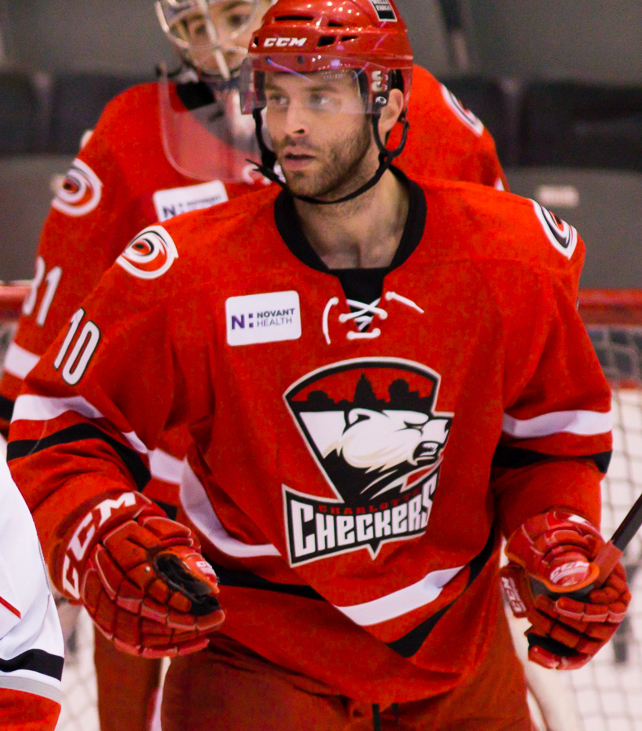
- Corrente with the Charlotte Checkers in 2014
- Born: March 17, 1988 (age 38) Mississauga, Ontario, Canada
- Height: 6 ft 1 in (185 cm)
- Weight: 210 lb (95 kg; 15 st 0 lb)
- Position: Defence
- Shot: Right
- Played for: New Jersey Devils
- NHL draft: 30th overall, 2006; New Jersey Devils
- Playing career: 2008–2016

Matthew Corrente (born March 17, 1988) is a Canadian former professional ice hockey defenceman who last played in the National Hockey League (NHL) with the New Jersey Devils. Corrente was born in Mississauga, Ontario.

== Playing career ==
In 2004, he was drafted into the Ontario Hockey League (OHL) by the Saginaw Spirit, 2nd overall. During the 2006–07 OHL season, he was traded to the Mississauga IceDogs. He was drafted 30th overall in the 2006 NHL entry draft by the New Jersey Devils. In 2007, the 2007 Future Watch published by The Hockey News ranked Corrente as the top defenceman in the New Jersey Devils system at the time, and third overall after forward Nicklas Bergfors and goalie Jeff Frazee.

Corrente was called up to the New Jersey Devils on October 14, 2010.

On July 10, 2013, Corrente left the Devils organization as a free agent and signed a one-year two-way contract with the Carolina Hurricanes. In the 2013–14 season, Corrente was assigned to AHL affiliate, the Charlotte Checkers. He featured in a career high 72 games, posting 2 goals and 11 points as the Checkers failed to make the playoffs.

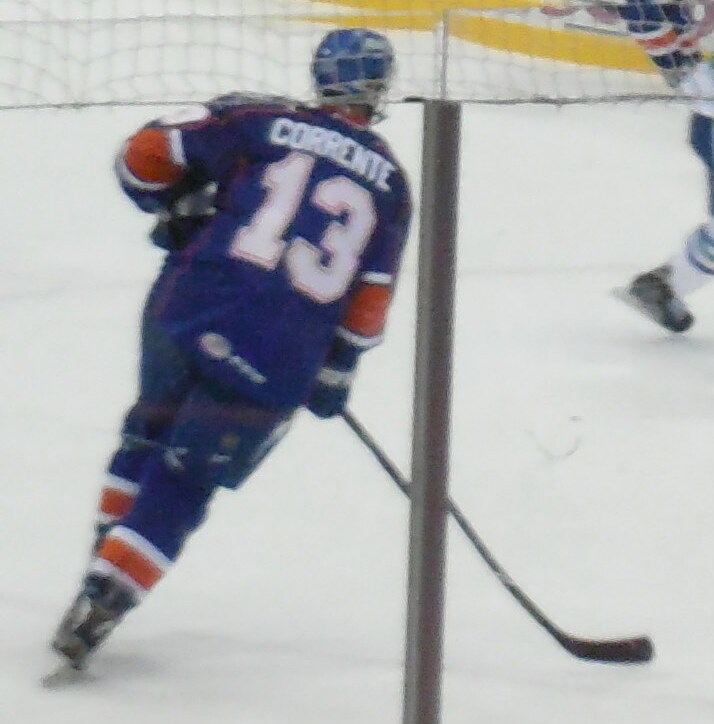
Corrente playing with the Syracuse Crunch in November 2014

On July 5, 2014, Corrente signed a one-year, two-way contract as a free agent with the Tampa Bay Lightning. During the 2014–15 season, on March 2, 2015, Corrente was loaned by the Lightning to the San Antonio Rampage. In return, the Syracuse Crunch received Ryan Martindale from the Florida Panthers.

As an unsigned free agent over the following summers, Corrente accepted a try-out contract to attend the Grand Rapids Griffins training camp and pre-season on September 28, 2015. Corrente failed to feature in a regular season game with the Griffins before he was released from his try-out on October 17, 2015.

Corrente now runs a hockey development school called Next Pro Hockey, which develops ice hockey players with aspirations to play hockey in the NHL.

== Personal ==
Corrente's brother David played for the Western Mustangs Men's Hockey team in the OUA.

== Career statistics ==
=== Regular season and playoffs ===
| | | | Regular season | | | | | Playoffs |
| Season | Team | League | GP | G | A | Pts | PIM | GP | G | A | Pts | PIM |
|---|---|---|---|---|---|---|---|---|---|---|---|---|
| 2003–04 | Vaughan Vipers | OPJHL | 39 | 3 | 7 | 10 | 87 | 4 | 1 | 1 | 2 | 14 |
| 2004–05 | Saginaw Spirit | OHL | 62 | 6 | 9 | 15 | 89 | — | — | — | — | — |
| 2005–06 | Saginaw Spirit | OHL | 61 | 6 | 24 | 30 | 172 | 4 | 1 | 1 | 2 | 8 |
| 2006–07 | Saginaw Spirit | OHL | 29 | 2 | 13 | 15 | 67 | — | — | — | — | — |
| 2006–07 | Mississauga IceDogs | OHL | 14 | 1 | 10 | 11 | 27 | 5 | 0 | 1 | 1 | 8 |
| 2007–08 | Niagara IceDogs | OHL | 21 | 2 | 13 | 15 | 64 | 10 | 0 | 5 | 5 | 33 |
| 2008–09 | Lowell Devils | AHL | 67 | 6 | 12 | 18 | 161 | — | — | — | — | — |
| 2009–10 | Lowell Devils | AHL | 43 | 5 | 15 | 20 | 74 | — | — | — | — | — |
| 2009–10 | New Jersey Devils | NHL | 12 | 0 | 0 | 0 | 24 | 2 | 0 | 0 | 0 | 2 |
| 2010–11 | Albany Devils | AHL | 3 | 0 | 1 | 1 | 10 | — | — | — | — | — |
| 2010–11 | New Jersey Devils | NHL | 22 | 0 | 6 | 6 | 44 | — | — | — | — | — |
| 2011–12 | Albany Devils | AHL | 39 | 2 | 6 | 8 | 73 | — | — | — | — | — |
| 2012–13 | Albany Devils | AHL | 11 | 0 | 2 | 2 | 32 | — | — | — | — | — |
| 2013–14 | Charlotte Checkers | AHL | 72 | 2 | 9 | 11 | 136 | — | — | — | — | — |
| 2014–15 | Syracuse Crunch | AHL | 48 | 2 | 6 | 8 | 101 | — | — | — | — | — |
| 2014–15 | San Antonio Rampage | AHL | 10 | 1 | 4 | 5 | 43 | — | — | — | — | — |
| 2015–16 | Florida Everblades | ECHL | 13 | 0 | 2 | 2 | 44 | — | — | — | — | — |
| AHL totals | | | 293 | 18 | 55 | 73 | 630 | — | — | — | — | — |
| NHL totals | | | 34 | 0 | 6 | 6 | 68 | 2 | 0 | 0 | 0 | 2 |

=== International ===
| Year | Team | Event | Result | GP | G | A | Pts | PIM |
|---|---|---|---|---|---|---|---|---|
| 2005 | Canada Ontario | U17 | 4th | 6 | 0 | 0 | 0 | 19 |
| 2006 | Canada | WJC18 | 4th | 7 | 0 | 0 | 0 | 28 |
| Junior totals | | | | 13 | 0 | 0 | 0 | 47 |

Awards and achievements
| Preceded by Niclas Bergfors | New Jersey Devils first-round draft pick 2006 | Succeeded by Mattias Tedenby |
