= Danny Syvret =

Canadian ice hockey player

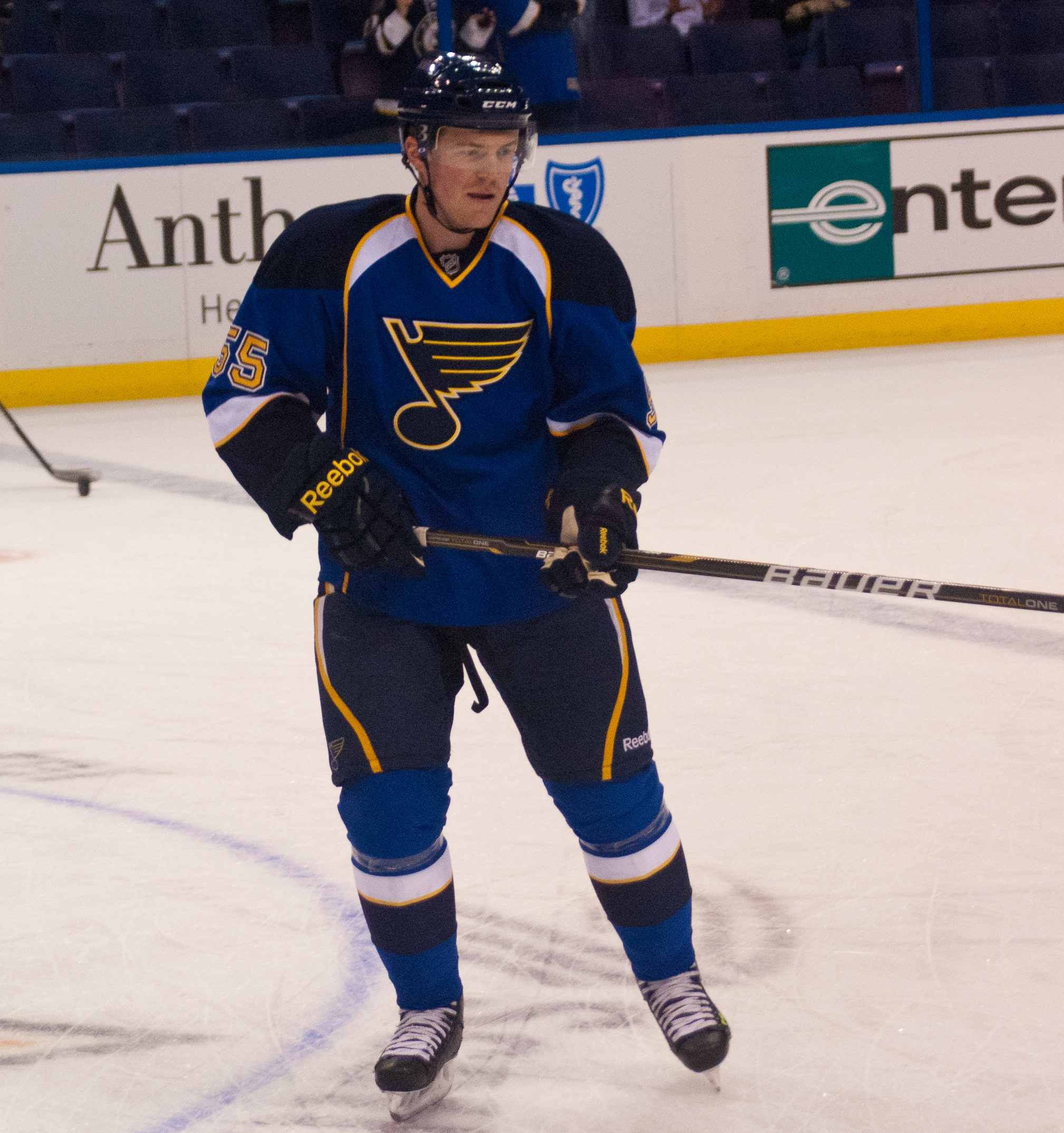
- Syvret in 2011
- Born: June 13, 1985 (age 41) Millgrove, Ontario, Canada
- Height: 6 ft 0 in (183 cm)
- Weight: 202 lb (92 kg; 14 st 6 lb)
- Position: Defence
- Shot: Left
- Played for: Edmonton Oilers; Philadelphia Flyers; Anaheim Ducks; Kölner Haie; Thomas Sabo Ice Tigers
- NHL draft: 81st overall, 2005; Edmonton Oilers
- Playing career: 2005–2017

Danny Syvret (born June 13, 1985) is a Canadian former professional ice hockey defenceman who played 59 games in the National Hockey League (NHL). Syvret was selected by the Edmonton Oilers in the third round (81st overall) of the 2005 NHL entry draft.

== Playing career ==
Syvret grew up in Millgrove, Ontario playing much of his minor hockey with the Flamborough Sabres, and the Halton Hurricanes of the OMHA South Central AAA League.

After his rookie season with the Cambridge Winterhawks Jr. B, Syvret was selected in the fifth round (85th overall) in the 2001 OHL Draft, by the London Knights. In the 2001-02 season Syvret was returned to the Cambridge Winterhawks Jr.B. team of the OHA Midwestern Ontario League.

Syvret spent his junior career with the London Knights of the OHL, eventually being named team captain. In his final year of junior hockey, he was captain of a powerhouse team that broke numerous junior hockey records and won the 2005 Memorial Cup, and is considered one of the most dominant junior teams in history. Syvret was the recipient of the OHL and CHL Defenceman of the Year in 2005. Danny also made another mark on history when he was part of the Canadian World Junior team that won the gold medal in 2005, tallying the game-winning goal.

Syvret made his professional debut with the Hamilton Bulldogs of the AHL, but was called up to the NHL just seven games into the 2005–06 NHL season because of injuries to Oilers defencemen Cory Cross, Marc-André Bergeron and Igor Ulanov. On February 26, 2007, Syvret was recalled by the Oilers after spending the majority of the season with the Grand Rapids Griffins. Syvret finished the 2006–07 season with the Oilers.

On June 6, 2008, he was traded to the Philadelphia Flyers in exchange for Ryan Potulny. He was sent to the Philadelphia Phantoms in the American Hockey League but was recalled by the Flyers on March 26, 2009.

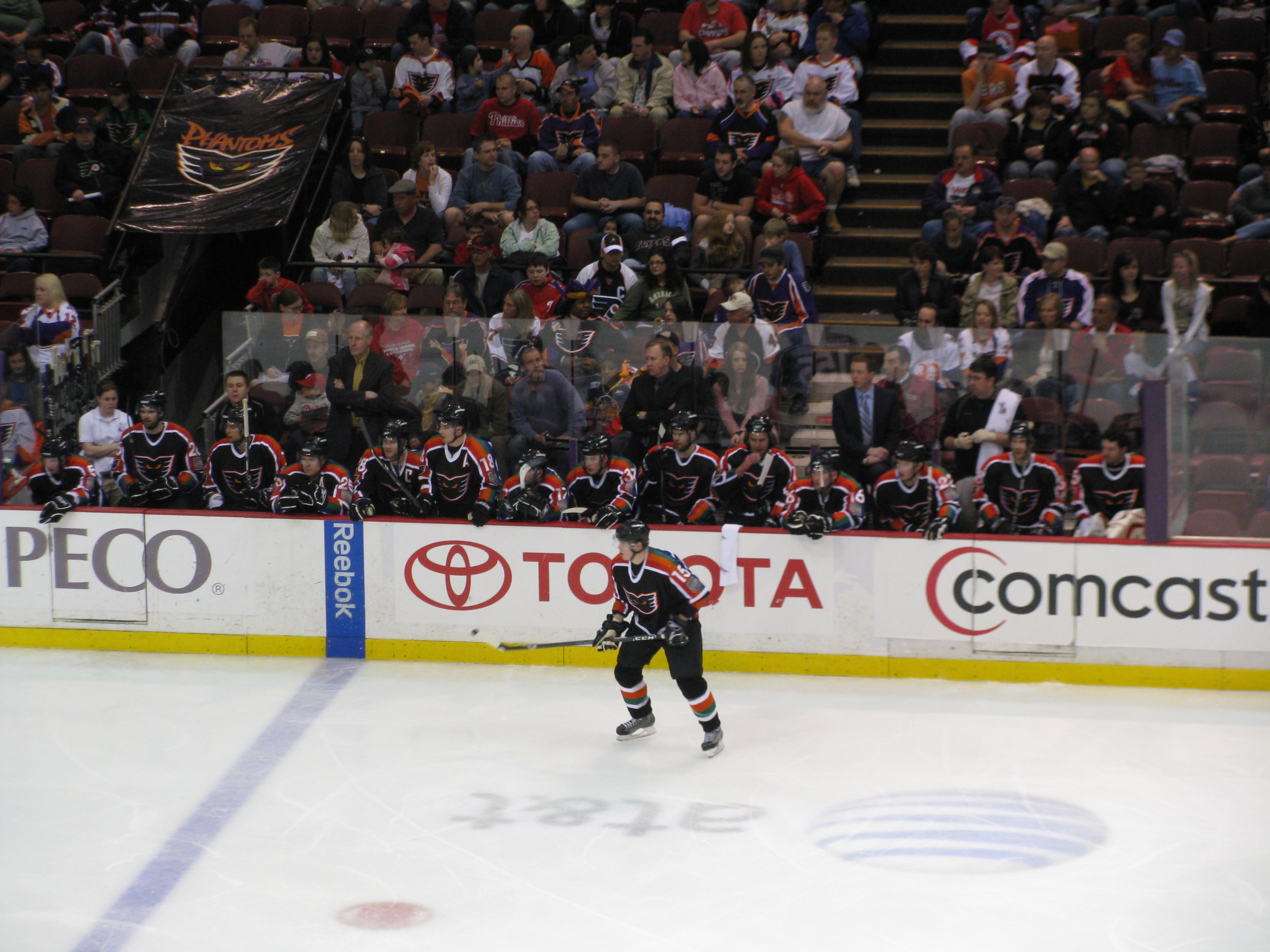
Syvret during his tenure with the Phantoms in 2009.

Syvret scored his first NHL goal at the 2010 NHL Winter Classic when the Boston Bruins defeated the Philadelphia Flyers 2-1 in overtime at Fenway Park.

Syvret signed with the Anaheim Ducks to a one-year deal on July 21, 2010, valued at $600,000 at the NHL level. Four months later on November 21, 2010, Syvret was traded back to the Flyers in a minor four player deal that saw Syvret and Rob Bordson sent to Philadelphia and David Laliberte and Patrick Maroon sent to Anaheim. Bordson and Syvret were immediately sent down to the Adirondack Phantoms of the AHL.

On August 7, 2011, Syvret signed a two-way contract with the St. Louis Blues who assigned him to play with their top AHL affiliate, the Peoria Rivermen. On March 23, 2012, he was placed on re-entry waivers by the Blues, for the purpose of being recalled.

On July 3, 2012, Syvret joined the Flyers' organization for a third time when he signed a two-year deal.

On July 1, 2013, Syvret was traded by the Flyers to the New York Rangers in exchange for Forward Kris Newbury. He was assigned to AHL affiliate, the Hartford Wolf Pack for the duration of the 2013–14 season, leading all Wolf Pack defenceman with 47 points in 76 games.

At the beginning of the 2014–15 season, Syvret as an unsigned free agent agreed to a try-out contract with the Iowa Wild on October 17, 2014. Syvret competed in 58 games with the Wild, producing 18 points before he was released from his try-out contract and signed to another try-out contract with the Wilkes-Barre/Scranton Penguins on March 9, 2015.

On December 18, 2015, Syvret agreed to a professional try-out contract (PTO) with the Vancouver Canucks' AHL affiliate, the Utica Comets. He produced 4 points in 10 games with the Comets before on January 27, 2016, Kölner Haie of the German top flight Deutsche Eishockey Liga (DEL) signed Syvret for the remainder of the 2015–16 season. In the off-season, Syret opted to continue in Germany, signing as a free agent with the Nürnberg Ice Tigers on May 25, 2016.

Following a year and a half in Germany, Syvret left as a free agent in the off-season and returned to Canada, ending his professional playing career with the intention to pursue a financial career on September 7, 2017.

== International play ==
Medal record

Representing Canada

Ice hockey

World Under-17 Championships
Bronze medal – third place	2002 Manitoba	

World Junior Championships
Gold medal – first place	2005 Grand Forks	

Spengler Cup
Silver medal – second place	2006 Davos	
Gold medal – first place	2007 Davos	

Danny won a bronze medal at the Under-17 Championship alongside London Knight teammates Corey Perry and Dylan Hunter. He helped lead Canada to a gold medal in the 2005 IIHF World Juniors, notching the game-winning goal.

Danny was a member of the 2006 Canadian National team that captured a silver medal at the Spengler Cup. He is also a member of the 2007 team who captured gold.

== Family ==
Danny's younger brother, Corey Syvret, was drafted by the Florida Panthers and currently is a referee in the NHL after a seven-year playing career in the ECHL. Danny's elder brother Dave Syvret Jr played with the Florida Everblades (ECHL).

== Career statistics ==
=== Regular season and playoffs ===
			Regular season					Playoffs
Season	Team	League	GP	G	A	Pts	PIM	GP	G	A	Pts	PIM
2000–01	Cambridge Winterhawks	MWJHL	46	7	16	23	30	15	1	2	3	6
2001–02	Cambridge Winterhawks	MWJHL	43	6	41	47	23	—	—	—	—	—
2001–02	London Knights	OHL	1	0	0	0	0	—	—	—	—	—
2002–03	London Knights	OHL	68	8	14	22	31	14	1	6	7	11
2003–04	London Knights	OHL	68	3	28	31	32	15	1	6	7	4
2004–05	London Knights	OHL	62	23	46	69	33	18	5	15	20	4
2004–05	London Knights	MC	—	—	—	—	—	4	1	4	5	2
2005–06	Hamilton Bulldogs	AHL	62	0	20	20	38	—	—	—	—	—
2005–06	Edmonton Oilers	NHL	10	0	0	0	6	—	—	—	—	—
2006–07	Grand Rapids Griffins	AHL	57	4	16	20	16	—	—	—	—	—
2006–07	Edmonton Oilers	NHL	16	0	1	1	6	—	—	—	—	—
2007–08	Springfield Falcons	AHL	36	1	7	8	14	—	—	—	—	—
2007–08	Hershey Bears	AHL	27	1	11	12	29	5	0	0	0	0
2008–09	Philadelphia Phantoms	AHL	76	12	45	57	44	4	0	1	1	0
2008–09	Philadelphia Flyers	NHL	2	0	0	0	0	—	—	—	—	—
2009–10	Adirondack Phantoms	AHL	15	5	8	13	6	—	—	—	—	—
2009–10	Philadelphia Flyers	NHL	21	2	2	4	12	—	—	—	—	—
2010–11	Anaheim Ducks	NHL	6	1	1	2	4	—	—	—	—	—
2010–11	Syracuse Crunch	AHL	8	0	4	4	11	—	—	—	—	—
2010–11	Adirondack Phantoms	AHL	51	10	26	36	27	—	—	—	—	—
2010–11	Philadelphia Flyers	NHL	4	0	0	0	2	10	0	0	0	0
2011–12	Peoria Rivermen	AHL	75	7	35	42	24	—	—	—	—	—
2012–13	Adirondack Phantoms	AHL	76	6	34	40	27	—	—	—	—	—
2013–14	Hartford Wolf Pack	AHL	76	9	37	46	34	—	—	—	—	—
2014–15	Iowa Wild	AHL	58	4	14	18	24	—	—	—	—	—
2014–15	Wilkes–Barre/Scranton Penguins	AHL	17	2	3	5	8	2	1	0	1	2
2015–16	Utica Comets	AHL	10	2	2	4	4	—	—	—	—	—
2015–16	Kölner Haie	DEL	12	1	5	6	10	15	0	5	5	8
2016–17	Nürnberg Ice Tigers	DEL	52	3	17	20	24	13	0	4	4	6
AHL totals			644	63	264	327	313	11	1	1	2	2
NHL totals			59	3	4	7	30	10	0	0	0	0

=== International ===
Year	Team	Event	Result	GP	G	A	Pts	PIM
2002	Canada Ontario	WHC17	3rd place, bronze medalist(s)	6	1	3	4	4
2005	Canada	WJC	1st place, gold medalist(s)	6	1	2	3	2
Junior totals				12	2	5	7	6

== Awards and honours ==
Award	Year
OHL
First All-Rookie Team	2003
London Knights Rookie of the Year	2003
London Knights Scholastic Player of the Year	2003
West All-Star Team	2005
First All-Star Team	2005
Max Kaminsky Trophy	2005
CHL Defenceman of the Year	2005
Memorial Cup All-Star Team	2005
Memorial Cup (London Knights)	2005
AHL
All-Star Game	2009
First All-Star Team	2009
