= Dave Barr (ice hockey) =

Canadian ice hockey player (born 1960)

- Born: November 30, 1960 (age 65) Toronto, Ontario, Canada
- Height: 6 ft 1 in (185 cm)
- Weight: 195 lb (88 kg; 13 st 13 lb)
- Position: Right wing
- Shot: Right
- Played for: Boston Bruins; New York Rangers; St. Louis Blues; Hartford Whalers; Detroit Red Wings; New Jersey Devils; Dallas Stars
- NHL draft: Undrafted
- Playing career: 1981–1997

David Angus Barr (born November 30, 1960) is a Canadian former professional ice hockey right winger who played 13 seasons in the National Hockey League for the Boston Bruins, New York Rangers, St. Louis Blues, Hartford Whalers, Detroit Red Wings, New Jersey Devils and Dallas Stars. He was previously an assistant coach for the Florida Panthers, Buffalo Sabres, New Jersey Devils, Minnesota Wild, Colorado Avalanche, and San Jose Sharks.

== Early life ==
Barr was born in Toronto, Ontario, but grew up in Edmonton, Alberta. Barr played junior hockey for the Billings Bighorns, Edmonton Oil Kings, Great Falls Americans, Portland Winter Hawks and Lethbridge Broncos of the Western Hockey League.

== Career ==
=== Playing career ===
Barr turned pro and played a total of 614 regular season games in the National Hockey League, notching 128 goals and 204 assists, for a total of 332 points, along with 520 PIM over his thirteen seasons. Because of his skill, work ethic and grit, Barr also became a valuable journeyman in the NHL – playing with seven different teams – including stops in Boston, New York (NYR), St. Louis, Hartford Detroit, New Jersey and Dallas. Following the NHL, he closed out his playing career with the IHL's Kalamazoo Wings and Orlando Solar Bears (where he was a player/assistant coach).

=== Coaching ===
After his retirement as an active player, he continued with coaching, first as an assistant and then becoming the head coach of the Houston Aeros of the International Hockey League in the 2000–2001 season. He also served as general manager for the Aeros for two seasons (2001–2003), including winning the Calder Cup in 2003, as the Aeros were one of six IHL teams to join the American Hockey League (AHL) in 2001 when the IHL folded. Following his AHL success, he was the general manager and then general manager/head coach of the Guelph Storm of the OHL from 2003–2008, where his team won the OHL Championship in 2003–04 and Barr collected the Matt Leyden Trophy, emblematic of the league's Coach of the Year, in 2005–2006. Barr was also named as the head coach of Canada's National Men's Summer Under-18 Team for the Under-18 Ivan Hlinka Memorial Tournament from August 14–18, 2007, in the Czech Republic and Slovakia. Barr left the OHL to become an assistant coach for the Colorado Avalanche of the NHL during the 2008–2009 NHL season but following a disappointing year in which they finished last overall in the NHL's Western Conference, the Avalanche fired their entire coaching staff.

On July 3, 2009, the Minnesota Wild hired Barr as an assistant coach. He was dismissed, along with head coach Todd Richards, by the Wild on April 11, 2011, in a Minnesota coaching staff restructuring. On July 29, 2011, Barr was named assistant coach of the New Jersey Devils, joining new coach Peter DeBoer on the staff. Barr was subsequently dismissed, along with head coach DeBoer, by the Devils on December 27, 2014, in a New Jersey coaching staff restructuring. On June 18, 2015, Dan Bylsma named him, along with Terry Murray, as assistant coaches of the Buffalo Sabres. On July 25, 2017, he was hired as an assistant coach for the San Jose Sharks to once again work under head coach Peter DeBoer, until he was fired along with the rest of the Sharks' coaching staff on December 11, 2019.

== Career statistics ==
=== Regular season and playoffs ===
			Regular season					Playoffs
Season	Team	League	GP	G	A	Pts	PIM	GP	G	A	Pts	PIM
1977–78	Pincher Creek Panthers	AJHL	60	16	32	48	53	—	—	—	—	—
1977–78	Billings Bighorns	WCHL	2	0	1	1	0	—	—	—	—	—
1978–79	Edmonton Oil Kings	WHL	72	16	19	35	61	8	4	0	4	2
1979–80	Great Falls Americans	WHL	3	0	1	1	10	—	—	—	—	—
1979–80	Portland Winterhawks	WHL	27	4	12	16	18	—	—	—	—	—
1979–80	Lethbridge Broncos	WHL	30	12	25	37	29	—	—	—	—	—
1980–81	Lethbridge Broncos	WHL	72	26	62	88	106	10	4	10	14	4
1981–82	Boston Bruins	NHL	2	0	0	0	0	5	1	0	1	0
1981–82	Erie Blades	AHL	76	18	48	66	29	—	—	—	—	—
1982–83	Boston Bruins	NHL	10	1	1	2	7	10	0	0	0	2
1982–83	Baltimore Skipjacks	AHL	72	27	51	78	67	—	—	—	—	—
1983–84	New York Rangers	NHL	6	0	0	0	2	—	—	—	—	—
1983–84	St. Louis Blues	NHL	1	0	0	0	0	—	—	—	—	—
1983–84	Tulsa Oilers	CHL	50	28	37	65	24	—	—	—	—	—
1984–85	St. Louis Blues	NHL	75	16	18	34	32	2	0	0	0	2
1985–86	St. Louis Blues	NHL	72	13	38	51	70	11	1	1	2	14
1986–87	St. Louis Blues	NHL	2	0	0	0	0	—	—	—	—	—
1986–87	Hartford Whalers	NHL	30	2	4	6	19	—	—	—	—	—
1986–87	Detroit Red Wings	NHL	37	13	13	26	49	13	1	0	1	14
1987–88	Detroit Red Wings	NHL	51	14	26	40	58	16	5	7	12	22
1988–89	Detroit Red Wings	NHL	73	27	32	59	69	6	3	1	4	6
1989–90	Detroit Red Wings	NHL	62	10	25	35	45	—	—	—	—	—
1989–90	Adirondack Red Wings	AHL	9	1	14	15	17	—	—	—	—	—
1990–91	Detroit Red Wings	NHL	70	18	22	40	55	—	—	—	—	—
1991–92	New Jersey Devils	NHL	41	6	12	18	32	—	—	—	—	—
1991–92	Utica Devils	AHL	1	0	0	0	7	—	—	—	—	—
1992–93	New Jersey Devils	NHL	62	6	8	14	61	5	1	0	1	6
1993–94	Dallas Stars	NHL	20	2	5	7	21	3	0	1	1	4
1993–94	Kalamazoo Wings	IHL	4	3	2	5	5	—	—	—	—	—
1994–95	Kalamazoo Wings	IHL	66	18	41	59	77	16	1	4	5	8
1995–96	Orlando Solar Bears	IHL	82	38	62	100	87	23	8	13	21	14
1996–97	Orlando Solar Bears	IHL	50	15	29	44	29	9	2	3	5	8
NHL totals			614	128	204	332	520	71	12	10	22	70

== Coaching record ==
Team	Year	Regular season							Postseason
Team	Year	G	W	L	T	OTL	Pts	Finish	Result
HOU	2000–01	82	42	32	-	8	92	2nd in West	Lost in first round
GUE	2004–05	68	23	34	10	1	57	5th in Midwest	Lost in first round
GUE	2005–06	68	40	24	-	4	84	3rd in Midwest	Lost in third round
GUE	2006–07	68	33	23	-	12	78	3rd in Midwest	Lost in first round
GUE	2007–08	68	34	25	-	9	77	3rd in Midwest	Lost in second round

== Awards and achievements ==
- He won the 1983–84 CHL Championship (Adams Cup) as a member of the Tulsa Oilers team coached by Tom Webster.
- 2002–03 Calder Cup champion
- 2005–06 Matt Leyden Trophy winner
