= Dylan Hunter =

Canadian ice hockey player (born 1985)

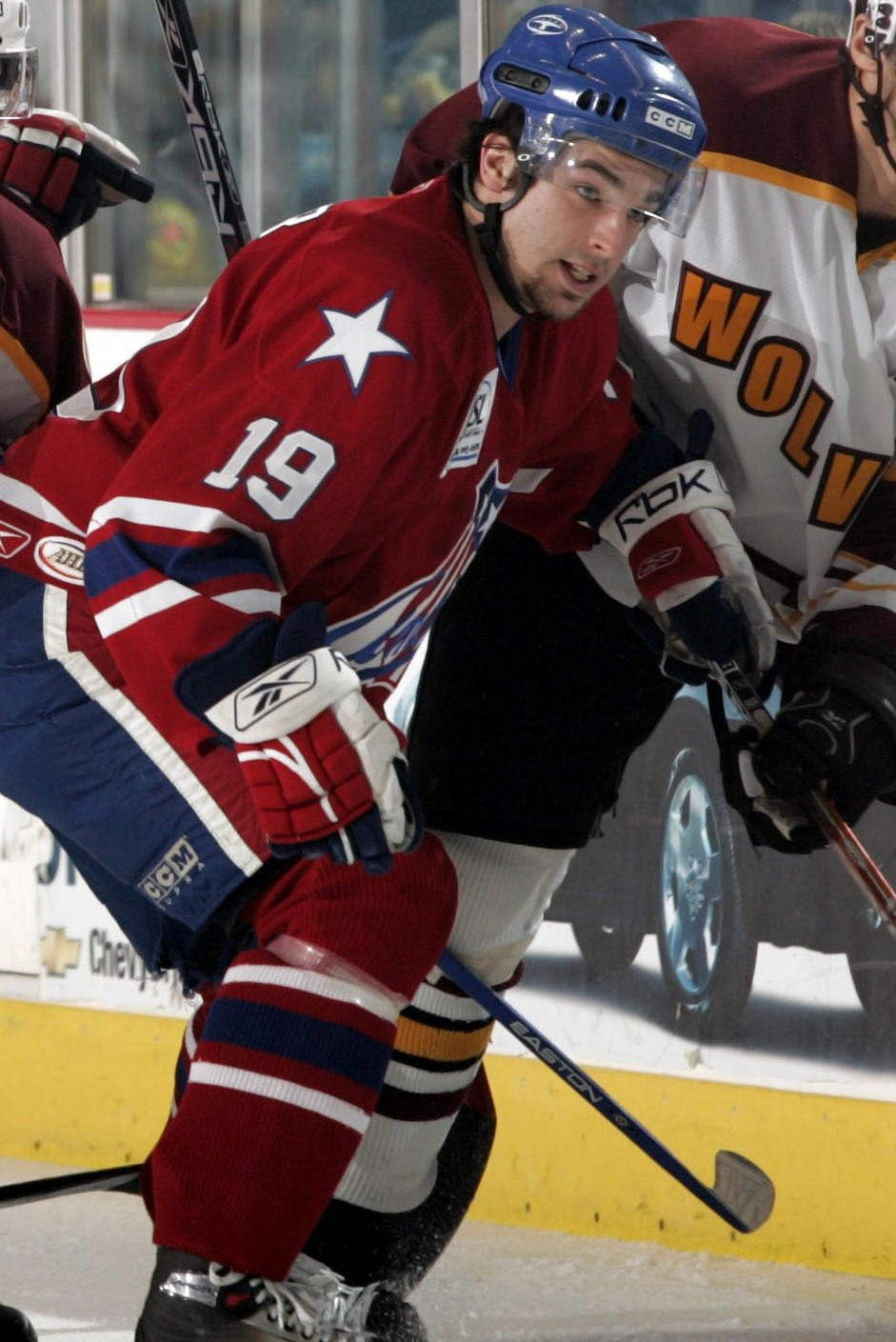
- Hunter with the Rochester Americans in 2006
- Born: May 21, 1985 (age 41) Quebec City, Quebec, Canada
- Height: 5 ft 11 in (180 cm)
- Weight: 196 lb (89 kg; 14 st 0 lb)
- Position: Centre
- Shot: Left
- Played for: Rochester Americans; Portland Pirates; Houston Aeros; Milwaukee Admirals; Cincinnati Cyclones
- NHL draft: 273rd overall, 2004; Buffalo Sabres
- Playing career: 2006–2011

Dylan Hunter (born May 21, 1985) is a Canadian former ice hockey player, who is a former captain of the London Knights of the OHL and is now currently an assistant coach for the London Knights.

He was drafted 273rd overall in the 2004 NHL entry draft by the Buffalo Sabres, in the 9th round. He is the son of Dale Hunter.

== Early life ==
Dylan is one of the three children born to Dale Hunter and his wife Karynka. He was born in Quebec City when his dad was a member of the Quebec Nordiques but grew up in the Washington, D.C. area when his dad was traded to the Washington Capitals and moved to London, Ontario following his family’s purchase of the Ontario Hockey League’s London Knights.

== Playing career ==
- Member of Team Ontario in the World Under-17 Championships in Selkirk, Manitoba.
- Member of the Canada/Russia Challenge Series in November 2004.
- Member of the Memorial Cup Champion London Knights (2005).
- Became Knights franchise leader in games played on December 2, 2005 (275).
- Captain of the London Knights (2005/2006 season).
- With Rob Schremp and David Bolland, Hunter was one-third of one of the most productive lines in the Canadian Hockey League during the 2005/2006 season.
- Named American Hockey League Player of the Week for the week ending November 5, 2007.

== Awards ==
- 2003–04 OHL Western Conference Third Team All-Star.
- 2004–05 OHL Western Conference All-Star.
- 2005–06 OHL Western Conference All-Star.

== Career statistics ==
			Regular season					Playoffs
Season	Team	League	GP	G	A	Pts	PIM	GP	G	A	Pts	PIM
2000–01	London Nationals	GOHL	50	12	20	32	75	—	—	—	—	—
2001–02	London Knights	OHL	54	6	21	27	38	6	1	1	2	10
2002–03	London Knights	OHL	68	11	31	42	41	14	3	3	6	8
2003–04	London Knights	OHL	64	26	53	79	47	15	4	10	14	10
2004–05	London Knights	OHL	67	31	73	104	64	18	10	11	21	16
2005–06	London Knights	OHL	62	32	85	117	50	19	13	23	36	16
2006–07	Rochester Americans	AHL	67	8	20	28	42	6	1	2	3	2
2007–08	Rochester Americans	AHL	70	20	27	47	69	—	—	—	—	—
2008–09	Portland Pirates	AHL	45	3	13	16	24	—	—	—	—	—
2009–10	Houston Aeros	AHL	1	0	0	0	0	—	—	—	—	—
2009–10	Utah Grizzlies	ECHL	43	18	35	53	24	9	0	5	5	6
2009–10	Rochester Americans	AHL	10	1	1	2	2	—	—	—	—	—
2009–10	Milwaukee Admirals	AHL	9	1	1	2	2	—	—	—	—	—
2010–11	Cincinnati Cyclones	ECHL	24	7	15	22	37	—	—	—	—	—
2010–11	Milwaukee Admirals	AHL	37	2	3	5	21	5	0	0	0	2
AHL totals			239	35	65	100	160	11	1	2	3	4
