= Bobby Orr Trophy =

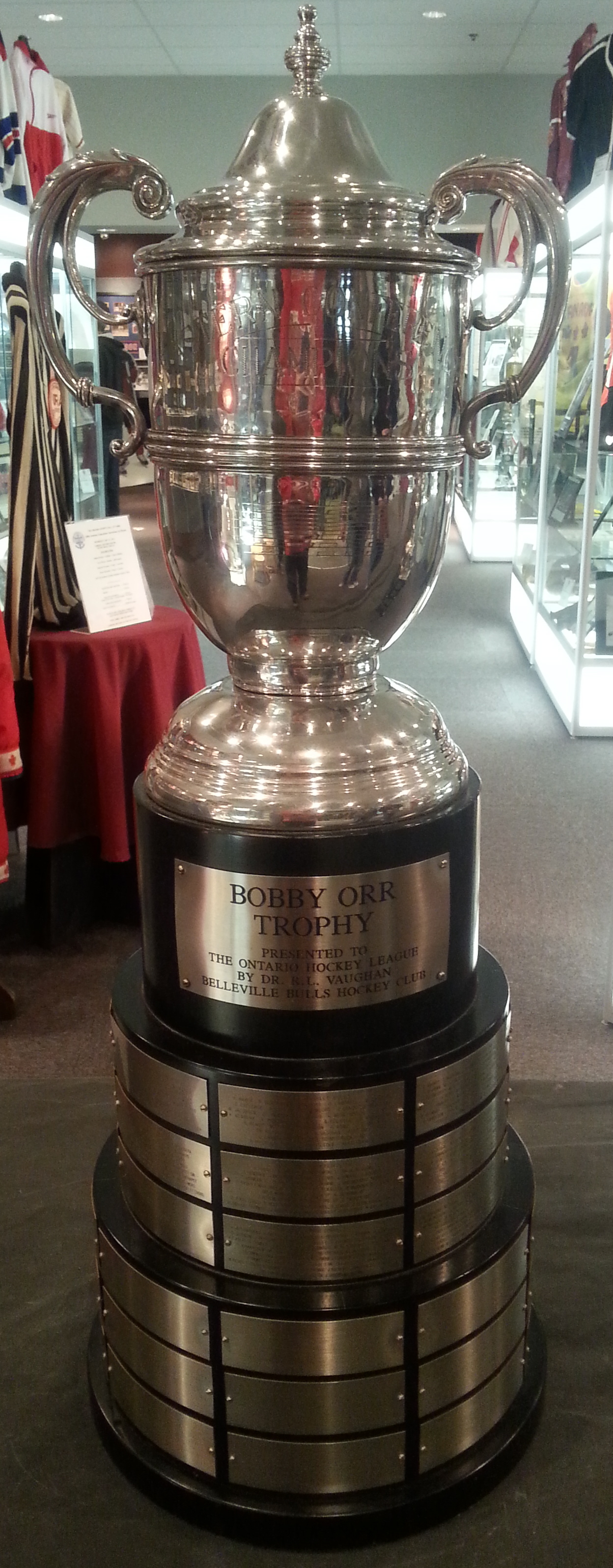
- Sport: Ice hockey
- Awarded for: Eastern Conference playoff champions

History
- First award: 1999
- Most wins: Barrie Colts (5)
- Most recent: Barrie Colts (5)

The Bobby Orr Trophy is awarded annually to the champion of the Eastern conference playoffs in the Ontario Hockey League. It was first awarded in 1999. The winning team competes for the J. Ross Robertson Cup in the OHL finals versus the Wayne Gretzky Trophy winner.

The trophy is named in honour of Bobby Orr, a graduate of the Oshawa Generals, and a recurring coach in the CHL Top Prospects Game. Orr played in 193 games with the Generals from 1962 to 1966, scoring 280 points. He won the J. Ross Robertson Cup in the 1965–66 season, and led the Generals to a 1966 Memorial Cup appearance.

== Winners ==
List of winners of the Bobby Orr Trophy.

Season	Champion	Series	Finalist
1998–99	Belleville Bulls	4–1	Oshawa Generals
1999–2000	Barrie Colts	4–1	Belleville Bulls
2000–01	Ottawa 67's	4–0	Toronto St. Michael's Majors
2001–02	Barrie Colts	4–0	Toronto St. Michael's Majors
2002–03	Ottawa 67's	4–3	Toronto St. Michael's Majors
2003–04	Mississauga IceDogs	4–2	Toronto St. Michael's Majors
2004–05	Ottawa 67's	4–0	Peterborough Petes
2005–06	Peterborough Petes	4–1	Barrie Colts
2006–07	Sudbury Wolves	4–2	Belleville Bulls
2007–08	Belleville Bulls	4–1	Oshawa Generals
2008–09	Brampton Battalion	4–2	Belleville Bulls
2009–10	Barrie Colts	4–1	Mississauga St. Michael's Majors
2010–11	Mississauga St. Michael's Majors	4–1	Niagara IceDogs
2011–12	Niagara IceDogs	4–1	Ottawa 67's
2012–13	Barrie Colts	4–3	Belleville Bulls
2013–14	North Bay Battalion	4–0	Oshawa Generals
2014–15	Oshawa Generals	4–2	North Bay Battalion
2015–16	Niagara IceDogs	4–0	Barrie Colts
2016–17	Mississauga Steelheads	4–0	Peterborough Petes
2017–18	Hamilton Bulldogs	4–1	Kingston Frontenacs
2018–19	Ottawa 67's	4–0	Oshawa Generals
2019–20	Playoffs cancelled due to the coronavirus pandemic – trophy not awarded		
2020–21	Season cancelled due to the coronavirus pandemic – trophy not awarded		
2021–22	Hamilton Bulldogs	4–0	North Bay Battalion
2022–23	Peterborough Petes	4–3	North Bay Battalion
2023–24	Oshawa Generals	4–3	North Bay Battalion
2024–25	Oshawa Generals	4–0	Barrie Colts
2025–26	Barrie Colts	4–3	Brantford Bulldogs

== See also ==
- List of Canadian Hockey League awards
