= Evan McGrath =

Canadian ice hockey player (born 1986)

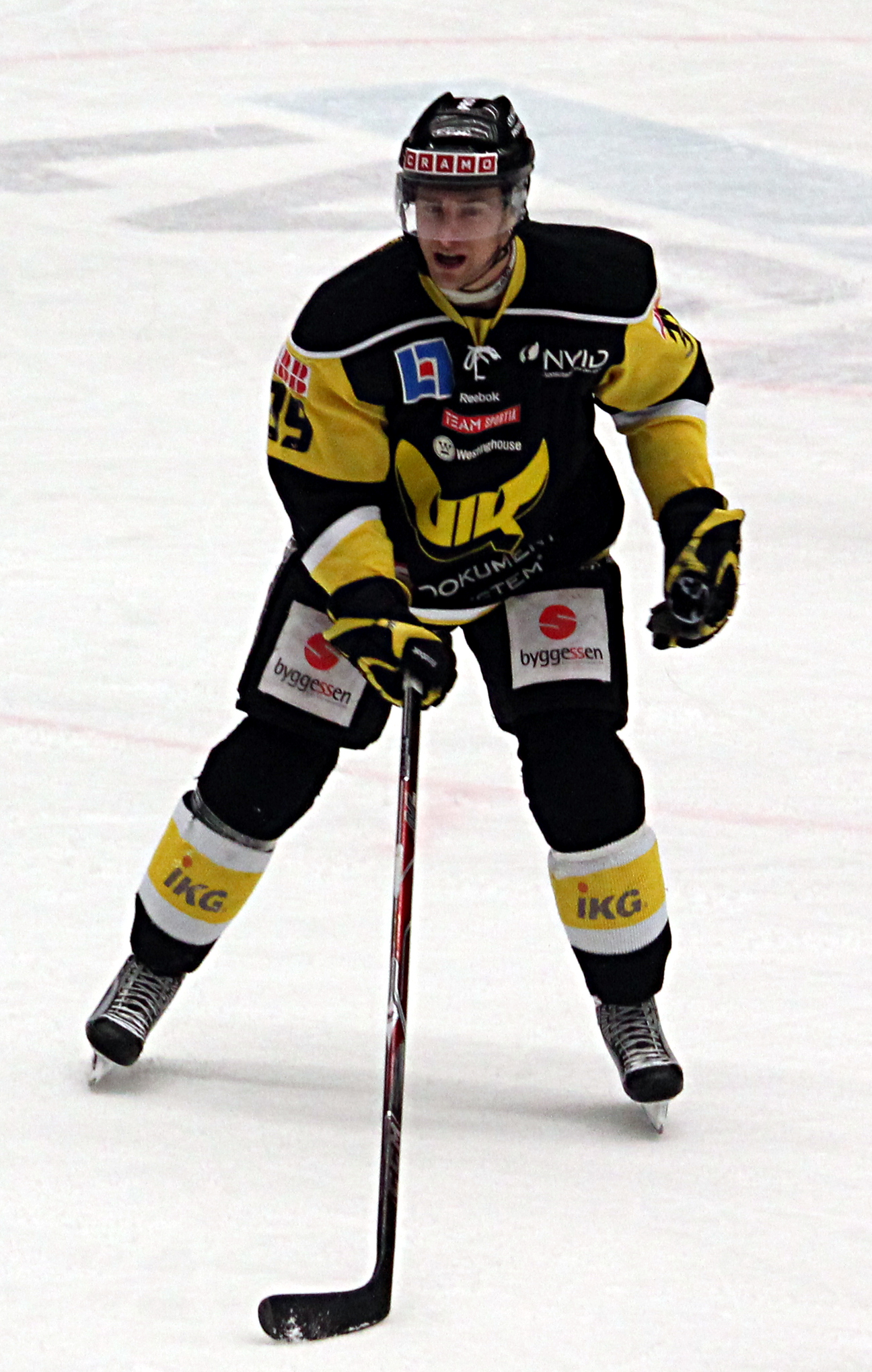
- Born: January 14, 1986 (age 40) Oakville, Ontario, Canada
- Height: 6 ft 0 in (183 cm)
- Weight: 195 lb (88 kg; 13 st 13 lb)
- Position: Centre
- Shot: Left
- Played for: Grand Rapids Griffins; Syracuse Crunch; Frölunda HC; HC Davos; EC VSV; EC Kassel Huskies; Sheffield Steelers
- NHL draft: 128th overall, 2004; Detroit Red Wings
- Playing career: 2006–2019

Evan McGrath (born January 14, 1986) is a Canadian-Polish former professional ice hockey player, who most notably played in the American Hockey League (AHL), and later played senior men's hockey with the Wentworth Gryphins of the Allan Cup Hockey (ACH).

== Playing career ==
An effective offensive player with the Ontario Hockey League's Kitchener Rangers, McGrath was drafted by the Detroit Red Wings in the 4th round (128th overall) of the 2004 NHL entry draft. The Wings' organization regarding McGrath as a potential future power forward, though he has thus far had some difficulty adjusting to the pro game. By the end of the 2009-10 season he was reassigned to the Syracuse Crunch and was not qualified prior to free agency, allowing him to become an unrestricted free agent.

On September 17, 2010, it was announced that McGrath had signed with VIK Västerås HK of the HockeyAllsvenskan. In 2011, Evan McGrath signed with Swedish team IK Oskarshamn. And on April 18, 2013, it was announced the McGrath had signed a contract with Frölunda HC.

He also spent the 2014–15 campaign in Sweden, again playing for VIK Västerås HK before transferring to fellow Allsvenskan team IK Oskarshamn.

The 2015–16 season saw him turn out for HC Thurgau of the National League B, the second-tier of Swiss ice hockey. He tallied 11 goals and 25 assists in 25 NLB games.

In April 2016, EC VSV of the Austrian top-flight EBEL signed McGrath for the 2016–17 season. In his debut season with Villach, McGrath appeared in 49 games and contributed with 13 goals and 37 points. With Villach falling out of playoff contention, McGrath was not tendered a contract to remain with the club.

On July 18, 2017, McGrath was offered a contract on a try-out basis with German outfit, Adler Mannheim of the DEL, but was waived in early September 2017. He signed with German second-division side Kassel Huskies shortly after.

McGrath then played for the Sheffield Steelers of the Elite Ice Hockey League (EIHL) in the 2018–19 season. Following his one-year tenure in the U.K., McGrath announced his retirement after a professional hockey career that lasted thirteen seasons (2006 to 2019).

== Personal life ==
McGrath is married to Maddison Gilmour, daughter of Hockey Hall of Famer Doug Gilmour.

== Career statistics ==
=== Regular season and playoffs ===
			Regular season					Playoffs
Season	Team	League	GP	G	A	Pts	PIM	GP	G	A	Pts	PIM
2001–02	Oakville Blades	OPJHL	49	43	44	87	24	—	—	—	—	—
2002–03	Kitchener Rangers	OHL	64	16	31	47	40	21	6	2	8	6
2003–04	Kitchener Rangers	OHL	68	15	36	51	28	5	2	1	3	2
2004–05	Kitchener Rangers	OHL	68	28	59	87	51	15	7	6	13	6
2005–06	Kitchener Rangers	OHL	67	37	77	114	63	—	—	—	—	—
2006–07	Toledo Storm	ECHL	9	6	9	15	12	—	—	—	—	—
2006–07	Grand Rapids Griffins	AHL	59	6	8	14	41	7	0	0	0	0
2007–08	Grand Rapids Griffins	AHL	78	18	17	35	26	—	—	—	—	—
2008–09	Grand Rapids Griffins	AHL	68	17	30	47	24	—	—	—	—	—
2009–10	Grand Rapids Griffins	AHL	57	8	11	19	25	—	—	—	—	—
2009–10	Syracuse Crunch	AHL	15	4	2	6	2	—	—	—	—	—
2010–11	VIK Västerås HK	Allsv	49	15	28	43	47	6	0	0	0	2
2011–12	IK Oskarshamn	Allsv	51	15	21	36	32	6	2	3	5	6
2012–13	IK Oskarshamn	Allsv	52	22	28	50	38	1	0	1	1	4
2013–14	Frölunda HC	SHL	47	6	12	18	12	—	—	—	—	—
2013–14	VIK Västerås HK	Allsv	—	—	—	—	—	8	1	2	3	2
2014–15	VIK Västerås HK	Allsv	13	0	1	1	8	—	—	—	—	—
2014–15	IK Oskarshamn	Allsv	33	10	9	19	26	—	—	—	—	—
2015–16	HC Thurgau	SUI.2	35	11	25	36	76	—	—	—	—	—
2015–16	HC Davos	NLA	—	—	—	—	—	1	0	0	0	0
2016–17	EC VSV	AUT	49	13	24	37	14	—	—	—	—	—
2017–18	Kassel Huskies	GER.2	52	20	38	58	36	1	0	0	0	0
2018–19	Sheffield Steelers	EIHL	56	13	36	49	34	2	0	1	1	4
2019–20	Brantford Blast	ACH	3	1	1	2	0	5	1	2	3	14
2022–23	Wentworth Gryphins	ACH	7	1	7	8	10	—	—	—	—	—
AHL totals			277	53	68	121	118	7	0	0	0	0
Allsv totals			198	62	87	149	151	21	3	6	9	14

=== International ===
Year	Team	Event	Result	GP	G	A	Pts	PIM
2003	Canada	U18	4th	5	0	1	1	6
2004	Canada	WJC18	4th	7	1	1	2	4
Junior totals				12	1	2	3	10

== Awards and honours ==
Award	Year
OHL
All-Rookie Team	2003
