= Liam Reddox =

Canadian ice hockey player (born 1986)

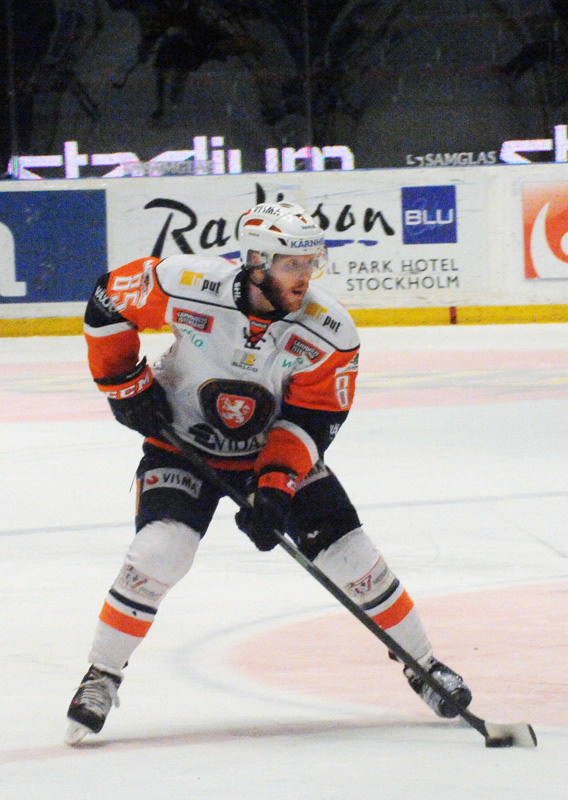
- Born: January 27, 1986 (age 40) Whitby, Ontario, Canada
- Height: 5 ft 10 in (178 cm)
- Weight: 190 lb (86 kg; 13 st 8 lb)
- Position: Left wing
- Shot: Left
- Played for: Edmonton Oilers; Växjö Lakers; Belfast Giants
- NHL draft: 112th overall, 2004; Edmonton Oilers
- Playing career: 2006–2020

Liam Reddox (born January 27, 1986) is a Canadian former professional ice hockey player. He most notably played in the National Hockey League (NHL) with the Edmonton Oilers and Captained the Växjö Lakers of the Swedish Hockey League (SHL). He has dual citizenship in both Canada and Scotland.

== Playing career ==
As a youth, Reddox played in the 2000 Quebec International Pee-Wee Hockey Tournament with the Toronto Marlboros minor ice hockey team.

Reddox was drafted in the fourth round of the 2002 Ontario Hockey League priority selection to the Peterborough Petes. He played four games with the team as a call-up during the 2002–03 season. Reddox, who currently lives in Whitby, Ontario, led the Petes in scoring in his first two full years with the team, including his rookie season in 2003–04.

In 2004, Reddox played in the IIHF World U-18 Hockey Tournament for Canada, where he is currently tied for 2nd amongst players all-time for “Most Goals in a Single Tournament”, behind only Connor McDavid.

Reddox spent three years with the Peterborough Petes, in which he played with both Eric and Jordan Staal, Calgary Flames prospect Daniel Ryder (the younger brother of Michael Ryder), and former Oiler, Bryan Young. Reddox played on a line with Ryder and Buffalo Sabres draft choice Patrick Kaleta. On the powerplay, he would be the second defenceman alongside Columbus Blue Jackets draft pick Trevor Hendrikx, and had Steve Downie, a Philadelphia Flyers draft, on the wing.

Reddox amassed 86 goals and 124 assists for 210 points during the 208 games he played with the Peterborough Petes. He was an assistant to captain Jamie Tardif in the 2005–06 season, in which the Petes won the Ontario Hockey League championship, in the team's 50th anniversary.

Reddox was signed to the Edmonton Oilers, who drafted him in the fourth round (112th overall) in the 2004 NHL entry draft, on June 1, 2006. He spent his first professional season in the Oilers organization with ECHL affiliate, the Stockton Thunder before moving up to the American Hockey League for the 2007–08 season with the Springfield Falcons. After making his NHL debut with a single appearance for the Oilers he was returned to the Falcons to end the year. In the 2008–09 season, Reddox was called up from the Falcons on November 14, 2008. Reddox then scored his first career NHL goal in just his second career game on November 15, 2008, against the Colorado Avalanche.

On August 9, 2010, Reddox was re-signed by the Oilers to a one-year contract.

On May 24, 2011, Reddox signed an initial one-year contract with the Växjö Lakers of the then-named Elitserien.

Following the 2018–19 season, having completed his 8th season with the Lakers, and 4th as Captain, Reddox left the club after his contract on April 4, 2019. In August 2019, Reddox signed for the Belfast Giants of the United Kingdom's Elite Ice Hockey League.

== Post-playing career ==
On January 30, 2024, the Växjö Lakers retired Reddox's number 85 prior to a game against Luleå HF.

== Career statistics ==
=== Regular season and playoffs ===
			Regular season					Playoffs
Season	Team	League	GP	G	A	Pts	PIM	GP	G	A	Pts	PIM
2001–02	Milton Merchants	OPJHL	3	0	0	0	0	—	—	—	—	—
2002–03	Wellington Dukes	OPJHL	43	32	32	64	29	—	—	—	—	—
2002–03	Peterborough Petes	OHL	4	0	0	0	0	—	—	—	—	—
2003–04	Peterborough Petes	OHL	68	31	33	64	22	—	—	—	—	—
2004–05	Peterborough Petes	OHL	68	36	46	82	38	14	3	10	13	10
2005–06	Peterborough Petes	OHL	68	19	45	64	74	19	5	9	14	20
2006–07	Stockton Thunder	ECHL	70	8	18	26	49	6	2	1	3	4
2007–08	Springfield Falcons	AHL	65	16	28	44	48	—	—	—	—	—
2007–08	Edmonton Oilers	NHL	1	0	0	0	0	—	—	—	—	—
2008–09	Springfield Falcons	AHL	14	5	4	9	2	—	—	—	—	—
2008–09	Edmonton Oilers	NHL	46	5	7	12	10	—	—	—	—	—
2009–10	Springfield Falcons	AHL	70	18	17	35	24	—	—	—	—	—
2009–10	Edmonton Oilers	NHL	9	0	2	2	4	—	—	—	—	—
2010–11	Oklahoma City Barons	AHL	37	18	15	33	16	—	—	—	—	—
2010–11	Edmonton Oilers	NHL	44	1	9	10	20	—	—	—	—	—
2011–12	Växjö Lakers	SEL	55	11	17	28	32	—	—	—	—	—
2012–13	Växjö Lakers	SEL	51	5	10	15	6	—	—	—	—	—
2013–14	Växjö Lakers	SHL	51	8	11	19	20	12	1	2	3	4
2014–15	Växjö Lakers	SHL	55	21	10	31	6	18	1	7	8	6
2015–16	Växjö Lakers	SHL	45	9	11	20	14	13	1	1	2	2
2016–17	Växjö Lakers	SHL	41	7	6	13	6	5	0	0	0	4
2017–18	Växjö Lakers	SHL	49	7	10	17	10	13	2	1	3	0
2018–19	Växjö Lakers	SHL	39	4	3	7	12	7	1	0	1	2
2019–20	Belfast Giants	EIHL	38	4	11	15	20	—	—	—	—	—
AHL totals			186	57	64	121	90	—	—	—	—	—
NHL totals			100	6	18	24	34	—	—	—	—	—
SHL totals			386	72	78	150	106	68	6	11	17	18

=== International ===
Year	Team	Event	Result	GP	G	A	Pts	PIM
2004	Canada	WJC18	4th	7	6	1	7	6
Junior totals				7	6	1	7	6
