= Mississauga IceDogs =

Canadian junior ice hockey team (1998–2007)

- City: Mississauga, Ontario
- League: Ontario Hockey League
- Conference: Eastern
- Division: Central
- Founded: January 21, 1997
- Operated: 1998–2007
- Home arena: Hershey Centre
- Colours: Red, Black, White, Gray

Franchise history
- 1998–2007: Mississauga IceDogs
- 2007–present: Niagara IceDogs

Championships
- Regular season titles: 2004–05 Emms Trophy
- Playoff championships: 2003–04 Bobby Orr Trophy

The Mississauga IceDogs were a Canadian junior ice hockey team in Mississauga, Ontario. They played in the Ontario Hockey League from 1998 to 2007. A sale relocated the team to St. Catharines, Ontario for the 2007–08 season and they are now called the Niagara IceDogs.

== History ==
From 1998 to 2002, the IceDogs enjoyed little success, finishing last in the OHL's Central Division every year. During this building phase, the team had six head coaches within the span of 4 years, including the owner, Don Cherry. Mississauga drafted first overall each year, leading to two rookies of the year, including one of the highest touted NHL prospects in Jason Spezza.

The IceDogs played their home games at the Hershey Centre, and hosted the OHL All-Star Game in 2000.

The team changed ownership in 2002 with venture capitalist Joel Albin acquiring the team from owners Don Cherry, Retrocom, sports agent Elliott Kerr, and Trevor Whiffer - lawyer of Don Cherry and the general manager of the IceDogs'.

In the 2002–03 season, the IceDogs finished fourth in the Central Division and made the playoffs for the first time in franchise history, but lost in the first round in five games against the Ottawa 67's.

2003–04 was the IceDogs' best season. The team finished second in the Central Division, two points behind the division champion Toronto St. Michael's Majors, and third overall in the Eastern Conference.

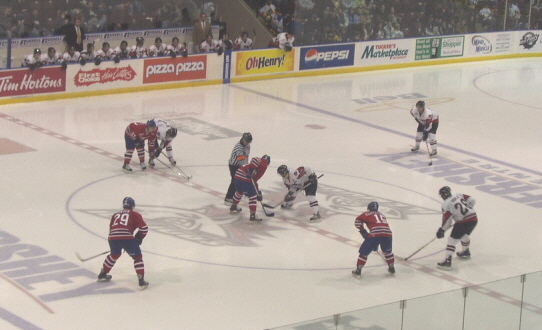
Mississauga IceDogs face off at home in overtime, February 10, 2006

In the first round of the playoffs, the IceDogs defeated the Oshawa Generals in seven games, winning their first-ever playoff series. The IceDogs were down three games to two against the Barrie Colts in the second round but managed to come back and win the series in seven games. The surprise IceDogs then upset the St. Michael's Majors in the Eastern Conference Championship series in six games to win the Bobby Orr Trophy and earn their first-ever trip to the Ontario Hockey League finals. The dream ended there as they fell to the Guelph Storm in four straight games in the OHL final, losing the fourth game at the Hershey Centre.

The 2004–05 season was another record setting season for the IceDogs. They won their first ever Central Division title and finished first in the Eastern Conference with 81 points. Despite regular season success, the IceDogs were upset in the first round of the playoffs by the eighth-seeded St. Michael's Majors in five games. In 2005–06, the IceDogs started rebuilding and missed the playoffs again.

=== Change in ownership ===
On July 12, 2006, Eugene Melnyk, owner of the Toronto St. Michael's Majors and the NHL's Ottawa Senators, bought the Mississauga IceDogs.

After the 2006–07 season, Melnyk sold the IceDogs, and moved the Majors to the Hershey Centre in Mississauga.

On January 8, 2007, Toronto businessman Tom Bitove proposed to buy the team with plans to move to Niagara Falls, but city council declined the proposal to build a new arena. As an alternative, the team approached the City of St. Catharines about moving the team into Jack Gatecliff Arena in the downtown core. St. Catharines City Council voted on a leasing arrangement on April 23, 2007, which passed.

Bill Burke bought the IceDogs and relocated the team to St. Catharines in time for the 2007–08 season, to be known as the Niagara IceDogs. The IceDogs played their final game in Mississauga on April 1, 2007, losing in game 5 of the Eastern Conference quarterfinals at home to the Sudbury Wolves.

== Coaches ==
List of head coaches:

- 1998–99 Peter Sturgeon & Jim Hulton
- 1999–2000 Jim Hulton, Geoff Ward & Steve Cherry
- 2000–01 Rick Vaive
- 2001–02 Don Cherry
- 2002–03 Steve Ludzik
- 2003–06 Greg Gilbert (3 seasons)
- 2006–07 Mike Kelly

== Players ==
=== Award winners ===
Season	Player	Award(s)	Recognition	Source
1999–2000	Jason Spezza	Jack Ferguson Award	First overall draft pick	
2000–01	Patrick Jarrett	Jack Ferguson Award	First overall draft pick	
2001–02	Patrick O'Sullivan	Jack Ferguson Award	First overall draft pick	
2001–02	Patrick O'Sullivan	Emms Family Award	OHL rookie of the year	
2001–02	Patrick O'Sullivan	CHL Rookie of the Year	Rookie of the year	
2002–03	Rob Schremp	Jack Ferguson Award	First overall draft pick	
2002–03	Rob Schremp	Emms Family Award	OHL rookie of the year	
2004–05	Michael Ouzas	OHL Goaltender of the Year	Goaltender of the year	

=== NHL alumni ===
List of IceDogs alumni who played in the National Hockey League (NHL):

- Cody Bass
- Luca Caputi
- Daniel Carcillo
- Matt Corrente
- Greg Jacina
- Dustin Jeffrey
- Brian McGrattan
- Sean McMorrow
- Patrick O'Sullivan
- Oskar Osala
- Alex Pietrangelo
- Kyle Quincey
- Igor Radulov
- Rob Schremp
- Jason Spezza
- Chad Wiseman

== Season-by-season results ==
Regular season and playoffs results:

Legend: GP = Games played, W = Wins, L = Losses, T = Ties, OTL = Overtime losses, SL = Shoot-out losses, Pts = Points, GF = Goals for, GA = Goals against

Memorial Cup champions	OHL champions	OHL finalists

Season	GP	W	L	T	OTL	SL	Pts	Win %	GF	GA	Standing	Playoffs
1998–99	68	4	61	3	—	—	11	0.081	145	426	5th Central	Did not qualify
1999–2000	68	9	56	1	2	—	21	0.154	160	346	5th Central	Did not qualify
2000–01	68	3	56	7	2	—	15	0.110	157	380	5th Central	Did not qualify
2001–02	68	11	47	6	2	—	32	0.235	212	327	5th Central	Did not qualify
2002–03	68	23	31	11	3	—	60	0.441	212	231	4th Central	Lost conference quarter-final (Ottawa 67's) 4–1
2003–04	68	36	21	7	4	—	83	0.610	217	199	2nd Central	Won conference quarter-final (Oshawa Generals) 4–3; Won conference semi-final (Barrie Colts) 4–3; Won conference final (Toronto St. Michael's Majors) 4–2; Lost OHL championship (Guelph Storm) 4–0
2004–05	68	34	21	12	1	—	81	0.596	207	172	1st Central	Lost conference quarter-final (Toronto St. Michael's Majors) 4–1
2005–06	68	21	40	—	5	2	49	0.360	192	299	5th Central	Did not qualify
2006–07	68	43	21	—	0	4	90	0.662	326	251	2nd Central	Lost conference quarter-final (Sudbury Wolves) 4–1

== Uniforms and logos ==
Uniforms used

The IceDogs' colours are red, white, black and silver. The logo is styled after Don Cherry's pet bull terrier named Blue. It shows a snarling dog overtop of the IceDogs name with a maple leaf in the background. The original logo (inset right) looked like an ice crystalized dog with red eyes in front of a big letter "M" with a maple leaf in the corner. The logo was redesigned after their 5th season with the change in ownership.

== See also ==
- List of ice hockey teams in Ontario
