= Millgrove, Ontario =

Settlement in Ontario, Canada

Coordinates: 43°20′10″N 79°57′30″W

Location of Millgrove in Ontario

Millgrove is a small rural community in Ontario, Canada.

== History ==
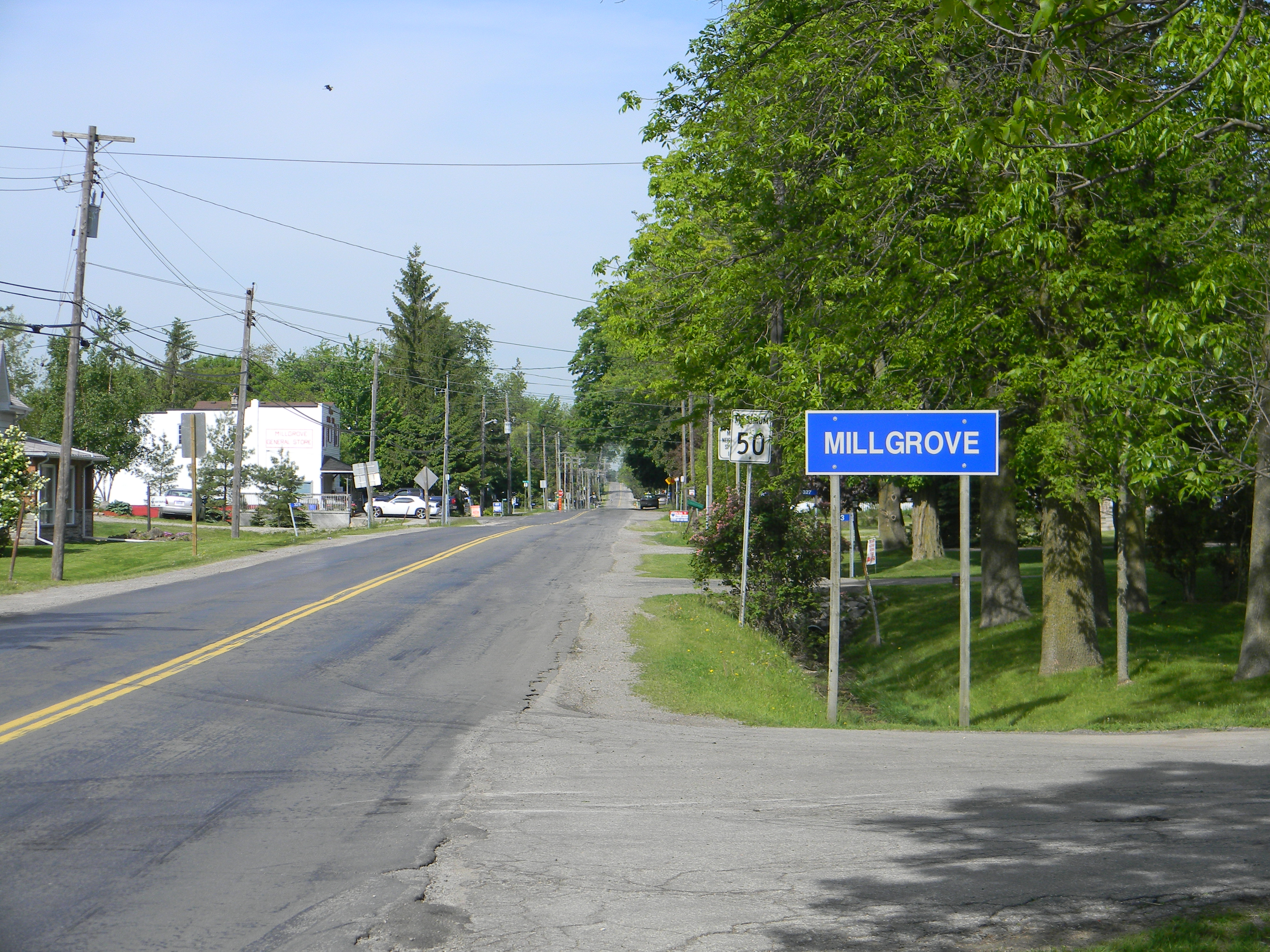
Millgrove

It is located within the former township of West Flamborough of the Flamborough region and is a part of the amalgamated city of Hamilton. There is Millgrove Public School, a park, cemetery, a riding barn in the name of Foxcroft, a corner store and many other things.

== Climate ==
Climate data for Millgrove
Month	Jan	Feb	Mar	Apr	May	Jun	Jul	Aug	Sep	Oct	Nov	Dec	Year
Record high °C (°F)	16.5 (61.7)	15.0 (59.0)	25.0 (77.0)	30.5 (86.9)	32.5 (90.5)	35.5 (95.9)	37.5 (99.5)	37.0 (98.6)	35.6 (96.1)	30.6 (87.1)	22.8 (73.0)	20.5 (68.9)	37.5 (99.5)
Mean daily maximum °C (°F)	−1.7 (28.9)	−0.4 (31.3)	4.4 (39.9)	11.9 (53.4)	18.7 (65.7)	24.2 (75.6)	26.8 (80.2)	25.9 (78.6)	21.7 (71.1)	14.4 (57.9)	7.2 (45.0)	1.0 (33.8)	12.9 (55.2)
Daily mean °C (°F)	−5.5 (22.1)	−4.6 (23.7)	−0.1 (31.8)	6.8 (44.2)	12.9 (55.2)	18.2 (64.8)	20.8 (69.4)	20.0 (68.0)	15.6 (60.1)	9.4 (48.9)	3.4 (38.1)	−2.4 (27.7)	7.9 (46.2)
Mean daily minimum °C (°F)	−9.3 (15.3)	−8.7 (16.3)	−4.7 (23.5)	1.5 (34.7)	7.0 (44.6)	12.2 (54.0)	14.7 (58.5)	14.0 (57.2)	10.1 (50.2)	4.3 (39.7)	−0.4 (31.3)	−5.8 (21.6)	2.9 (37.2)
Record low °C (°F)	−30.6 (−23.1)	−27.0 (−16.6)	−27.5 (−17.5)	−13.3 (8.1)	−5.6 (21.9)	0.0 (32.0)	3.9 (39.0)	1.1 (34.0)	−3.9 (25.0)	−10.6 (12.9)	−17.2 (1.0)	−28.0 (−18.4)	−30.6 (−23.1)
Average precipitation mm (inches)	75.0 (2.95)	67.5 (2.66)	70.4 (2.77)	82.6 (3.25)	94.1 (3.70)	85.2 (3.35)	94.9 (3.74)	81.5 (3.21)	96.7 (3.81)	82.6 (3.25)	98.6 (3.88)	75.8 (2.98)	1,004.5 (39.55)
Average rainfall mm (inches)	34.2 (1.35)	35.0 (1.38)	45.8 (1.80)	76.6 (3.02)	94.1 (3.70)	85.2 (3.35)	94.9 (3.74)	81.5 (3.21)	96.7 (3.81)	82.4 (3.24)	89.8 (3.54)	43.5 (1.71)	859.6 (33.84)
Average snowfall cm (inches)	40.8 (16.1)	32.1 (12.6)	24.7 (9.7)	6.0 (2.4)	0.0 (0.0)	0.0 (0.0)	0.0 (0.0)	0.0 (0.0)	0.0 (0.0)	0.2 (0.1)	8.8 (3.5)	32.2 (12.7)	144.9 (57.0)
Source: Environment and Climate Change Canada

== Notable people ==
- Danny Syvret – National Hockey League player

== In media ==
Gulliver's Lake RV Resort & Campground has been used to film episodes of the Cream Productions Paranormal TV Show Evil Encounters. One such episode entitled "Terror From the Sky" features the famous Travis Walton UFO incident.
