= Stanislav Polodna =

Czech ice hockey player

- Born: April 3, 1989 (age 35); Milevsko, Czechoslovakia
- Height: 5 ft 10 in (178 cm)
- Weight: 159 lb (72 kg; 11 st 5 lb)
- Position: Forward
- Shot: Left
- Played for: HC České Budějovice
- Playing career: 2010–2017

Stanislav Polodna (born April 3, 1989) is a Czech retired professional ice hockey player. He played eleven games with HC České Budějovice in the Czech Extraliga between 2010 and 2013.
