= Dick Todd (ice hockey) =

Canadian ice hockey coach

Richard Todd is a retired Canadian ice hockey coach. He has the second most wins by a coach in Ontario Hockey League history. Todd got his start as a coach with the Peterborough Petes in the 1970s as a trainer and worked his way up, becoming the team's head coach in 1982. Unlike the vast majority of hockey coaches, Todd never played the game at a high level. He led the team for the next eleven years, winning the J. Ross Robertson Cup in 1989 and 1993. Todd was awarded the Matt Leyden Trophy as OHL Coach of the Year in 1987–88. He also led Canada to a gold medal at the 1991 World Junior Ice Hockey Championships. In 1993 Todd took a job as an assistant coach with the New York Rangers, winning a Stanley Cup with them in 1994. He retired in 1998 but came back as coach of the Petes in 2004. In his final two years with the team, Todd recorded his 500th career victory. He did this faster than any other coach in Major Junior A hockey history, accomplishing the milestone in just 813 games. He also led the Petes to another OHL title before retiring again at the close of the 2005–06 OHL season.
