= Rob Schremp =

American ice hockey center (born 1986)

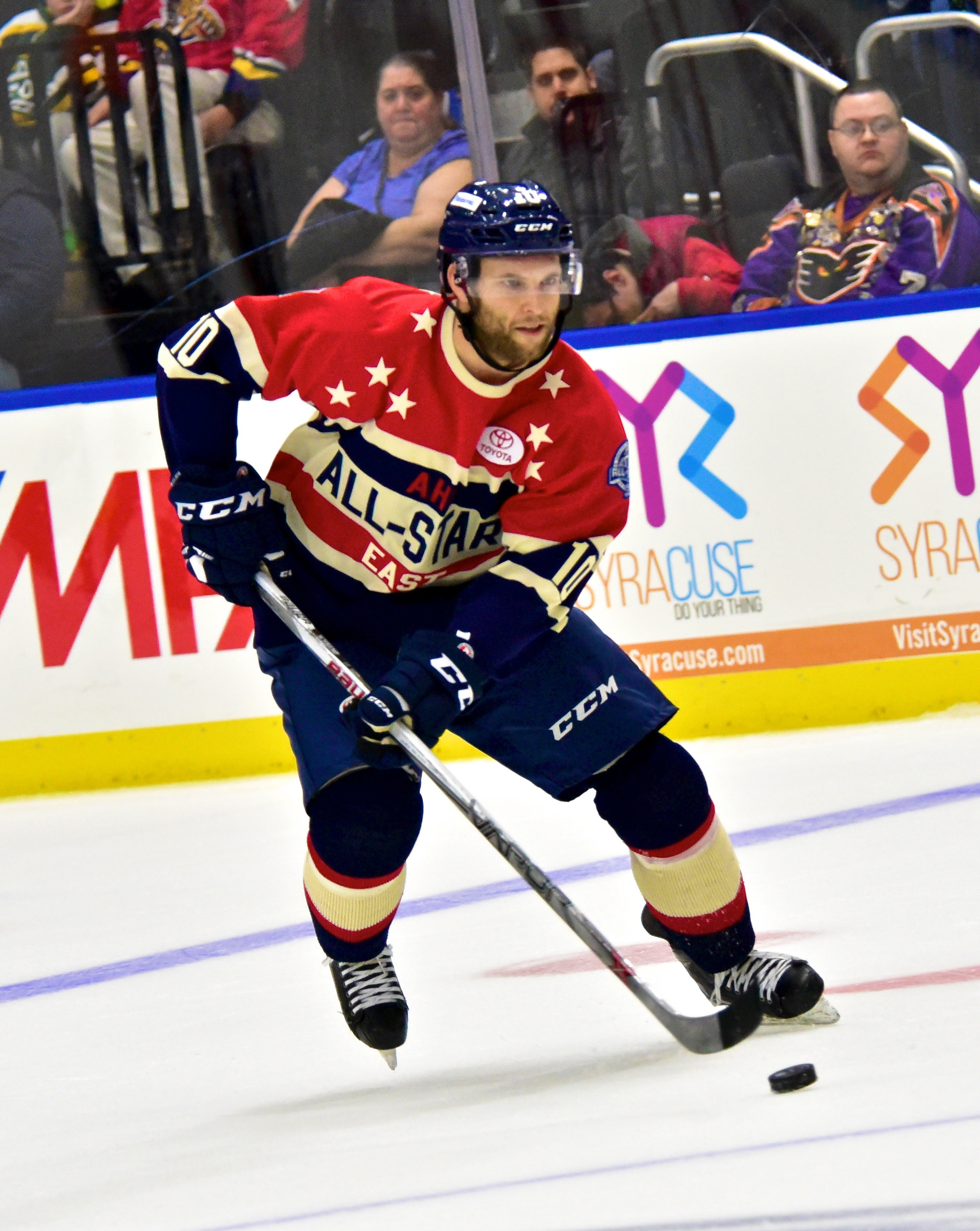
- Schremp in 2016
- Born: July 1, 1986 (age 39) Fulton, New York, U.S.
- Height: 5 ft 11 in (180 cm)
- Weight: 200 lb (91 kg; 14 st 4 lb)
- Position: Center
- Shot: Left
- Played for: Edmonton Oilers; New York Islanders; Atlanta Thrashers; Modo Hockey; Dinamo Riga; HK Liepājas Metalurgs; EC Red Bull Salzburg; EV Zug; Skellefteå AIK; SCL Tigers; Thomas Sabo Ice Tigers; HK Mogo
- NHL draft: 25th overall, 2004; Edmonton Oilers
- Playing career: 2006–2021

Robert B. Schremp (born July 1, 1986) is an American former professional ice hockey center who last played for HK Mogo of the Latvian Hockey Higher League. He was drafted by the Edmonton Oilers in the first round, 25th overall, of the 2004 NHL entry draft and has played for the Oilers, New York Islanders and Atlanta Thrashers in the NHL. Schremp was the director of hockey ops for the China Hockey Group out of Hong Kong. Schremp was in charge of the development of 400 players for the 2023-24 season. Rob is a versatile ex athlete as he is the Lead of Business Development for the agricultural biotech company Earth Microbial. Rob has helped grow the company’s golf course presence as well as their agriculture and home garden businesses.

== Playing career ==
=== Junior ===
Schremp grew up in Fulton, New York. As a youth, he played in the 1999 and 2000 Quebec International Pee-Wee Hockey Tournaments with a minor ice hockey team from Rochester, New York. He decided that a move to Canada would benefit his hockey career, and he spent his major junior years in the Ontario Hockey League (OHL). He spent his rookie season with the Mississauga IceDogs and after recording 26 goals and 74 points in 65 games, was named OHL rookie of the year for 2002–03.

Just three games into the 2003–04 season, Schremp was traded to the London Knights, the team with which he would spend the final three seasons of his OHL career. He began to impress during the 2004–05 season, scoring 41 goals and 90 points in 61 games as well as 13 goals and 29 points in 18 playoff games as he helped London to win their first Memorial Cup. That season, Schremp was also selected to play for the United States at the 2005 World Junior Championships, where he scored four goals and five points in seven games as the Americans finished in fourth place.

The 2005–06 season capped off a prolific junior career for Schremp, as he led the OHL in scoring with 57 goals and 145 points in 57 games before adding ten goals and 47 points in 19 playoff games. Schremp once again represented the U.S. at the 2006 World Junior Championships, recording six points en route to a second consecutive fourth-place finish.

=== Professional ===
==== NHL ====
Drafted by the Edmonton Oilers in the first round of the 2004 NHL entry draft, Schremp made his professional debut during the 2006–07 season with the Wilkes-Barre/Scranton Penguins, the Oilers' then-American Hockey League (AHL) affiliate. He also made his NHL debut that season, dressing for the Oilers in a game against the Minnesota Wild on April 5, 2007. Schremp, however, had difficulty securing a permanent roster spot with the Oilers and found himself playing primarily for the AHL's Springfield Falcons—the team's new AHL affiliate—over the following two seasons, seeing only limited action with Edmonton. He accumulated 171 points in 216 AHL games during that period, as well as three points in seven games with the Oilers.

On September 29, 2009, Schremp was claimed off waivers by the New York Islanders. He found more regular time with the Islanders, playing 44 games during the 2009–10 season. His first NHL goal came on December 12, 2009, in a game against the Boston Bruins. That season, Schremp tallied seven goals and 25 points.

Schremp posted another ten goals and 22 points in 45 games with the Islanders during the 2010–11 season, but on February 28, 2011, was claimed off waivers by the Atlanta Thrashers. He then scored his first goal as a Thrasher on March 9 against the Carolina Hurricanes, and finished the season with three goals and four points in 18 games with Atlanta for a total of 26 points in 63 games.

When the Thrashers were purchased and relocated to Winnipeg to become the Jets in May 2011, Schremp was not tendered a qualifying offer and thus became an unrestricted free agent.

==== Europe ====
On August 10, 2011, Schremp signed with Modo Hockey of the Elitserien in Sweden. He enjoyed a successful debut season in Sweden amongst the top scoring line in Modo, contributing 19 goals and 41 points in 55 games.

On June 1, 2012, Schremp opted to sign a lucrative two-year contract with Dinamo Riga of the Kontinental Hockey League (KHL). During the 2012–13 season, however, he failed to transition to the KHL, scoring only one goal in 21 games before leaving the team in November 2012 to sign a contract with Red Bull Salzburg of the Austrian Hockey League through the remainder of the season.

After re-establishing his offensive game with Salzburg, Schremp impressed Swiss National League A (NLA) club EV Zug and subsequently signed a one-year contract for the 2013–14 season on May 17, 2013. He scored 36 points in 42 games as Zug failed to make the playoffs though nonetheless avoiding relegation.

On July 8, 2014, Schremp continued his journeyman career, agreeing to play for his seventh European club in only his fourth season abroad, after signing a one-year contract with Metallurg Novokuznetsk of the KHL. Just two months later, In September 2014, it was announced that he left Metallurg to join Skellefteå AIK in the Swedish Hockey League (SHL). He advanced to the 2014–15 SHL Finals with Skellefteå, where they fell short to the Växjö Lakers.

On September 9, 2015, Schremp returned to North America after four years in accepting a try-out contract with the Portland Pirates of the American Hockey League (AHL), an affiliate of the Florida Panthers. He led the Pirates in scoring during the 2015–16 season, tallying 21 goals and 21 assists in 75 regular season contests and also played in five postseason games (two goals, one assist).

On May 24, 2016, the SCL Tigers of the Swiss top-flight National League A (NLA) announced the signing of Schremp on a one-year deal. Schremp parted ways with the SCL Tigers on January 31, 2017. He had tallied ten goals and 17 assists in 33 NLA appearances for the club. He was picked up by the Nürnberg Ice Tigers of the German DEL the next day.

In November 2018, Schremp announced his retirement.

In August 2020, after moving to Latvia, he returned to professional hockey, signing with HK Mogo of the Latvian Hockey Higher League.

== Career statistics ==
=== Regular season and playoffs ===
			Regular season					Playoffs
Season	Team	League	GP	G	A	Pts	PIM	GP	G	A	Pts	PIM
2000–01	Syracuse Jr. Crunch	OPJHL	49	32	46	78	51	—	—	—	—	—
2001–02	Syracuse Jr. Crunch	OPJHL	49	42	51	93	97	1	1	2	3	0
2002–03	Mississauga IceDogs	OHL	65	26	48	74	25	2	1	0	1	0
2003–04	Mississauga IceDogs	OHL	3	2	4	6	0	—	—	—	—	—
2003–04	London Knights	OHL	60	28	41	69	18	15	7	6	13	2
2003–04	US NTDP U18	USDP	2	0	0	0	8	—	—	—	—	—
2004–05	London Knights	OHL	62	41	49	90	54	18	13	16	29	16
2005–06	London Knights	OHL	57	57	88	145	74	19	10	37	47	35
2006–07	Wilkes–Barre/Scranton Penguins	AHL	69	17	36	53	36	—	—	—	—	—
2006–07	Edmonton Oilers	NHL	1	0	0	0	0	—	—	—	—	—
2007–08	Springfield Falcons	AHL	78	23	53	76	64	—	—	—	—	—
2007–08	Edmonton Oilers	NHL	2	0	0	0	0	—	—	—	—	—
2008–09	Springfield Falcons	AHL	69	7	35	42	50	—	—	—	—	—
2008–09	Edmonton Oilers	NHL	4	0	3	3	2	—	—	—	—	—
2009–10	New York Islanders	NHL	44	7	18	25	8	—	—	—	—	—
2010–11	Bridgeport Sound Tigers	AHL	1	0	1	1	0	—	—	—	—	—
2010–11	New York Islanders	NHL	45	10	12	22	12	—	—	—	—	—
2010–11	Atlanta Thrashers	NHL	18	3	1	4	4	—	—	—	—	—
2011–12	Modo Hockey	SEL	55	19	22	41	46	6	1	5	6	10
2012–13	Dinamo Riga	KHL	21	1	5	6	6	—	—	—	—	—
2012–13	HK Liepājas Metalurgs	BLR	1	0	0	0	0	—	—	—	—	—
2012–13	EC Red Bull Salzburg	EBEL	26	9	27	36	16	11	2	11	13	10
2013–14	EV Zug	NLA	42	9	27	36	8	—	—	—	—	—
2013–14	SCL Tigers	NLB	1	0	0	0	0	—	—	—	—	—
2014–15	Skellefteå AIK	SHL	42	6	14	20	16	3	1	1	2	0
2015–16	Portland Pirates	AHL	75	21	21	42	40	5	2	1	3	0
2016–17	SCL Tigers	NLA	33	10	17	27	10	—	—	—	—	—
2016–17	Thomas Sabo Ice Tigers	DEL	7	0	3	3	2	12	3	10	13	2
2017–18	EC Red Bull Salzburg	EBEL	36	9	38	47	16	19	5	9	14	14
2020–21	HK Mogo/LSPA	LAT	17	4	10	14	6	—	—	—	—	—
AHL totals			292	68	146	214	190	5	2	1	3	0
NHL totals			114	20	34	54	26	—	—	—	—	—

=== International ===
Year	Team	Event	Result	GP	G	A	Pts	PIM
2005	United States	WJC	4th	7	4	1	5	2
2006	United States	WJC	4th	7	1	5	6	4
Junior totals				14	5	6	11	6

== Awards and honours ==
Award	Year
OHL
Jack Ferguson Award	2002
Emms Family Award	2003
CHL All-Rookie Team	2003
CHL Top Prospects Game	2004
Memorial Cup (London Knights)	2005
Eddie Powers Memorial Trophy	2006
CHL First All-Star Team	2006
AHL
All-Star Game	2008, 2016

Awards and achievements
Preceded by Devan Dubnyk	Edmonton Oilers first-round draft pick 2004	Succeeded by Andrew Cogliano
