= Adam Dennis =

Canadian-born Italian ice hockey goalie

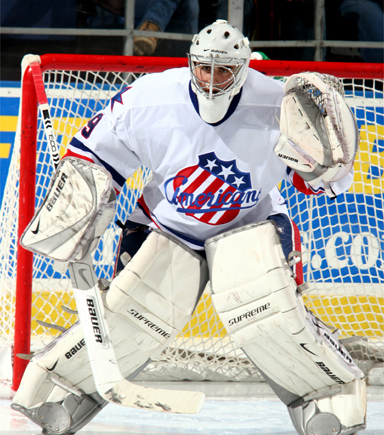
- Dennis with the Rochester Americans in 2006
- Born: February 8, 1985 (age 41) Toronto, Ontario, Canada
- Height: 6 ft 0 in (183 cm)
- Weight: 190 lb (86 kg; 13 st 8 lb)
- Position: Goaltender
- Caught: Right
- DEL team Former teams: Kölner Haie; OHL; Guelph Storm; London Knights; AHL; Rochester Americans; Portland Pirates
- National team: Italy
- NHL draft: 182nd overall, 2005; Buffalo Sabres
- Playing career: 2006–2014

Adam Dennis (born February 8, 1985) is a Canadian-born Italian former professional ice hockey goalie and current general Manager of the Ontario Hockey League's North Bay Battalion.

== Career ==
Dennis was born in Toronto, Ontario, Canada. He played junior hockey in the Ontario Hockey League. He was acquired by the London Knights from the Guelph Storm on January 10, 2005, in exchange for goalie Ryan MacDonald and 3 draft picks.

He was drafted by the Buffalo Sabres of the National Hockey League in the sixth round, #182 overall in the 2005 NHL Entry Draft.

=== Playing career ===
- Posted his first career OHL Shutout on Nov 22, 2003 when he faced the Sarnia Sting making 40 saves in Net. He was also the game's first star.
- Guelph Storm hockey team in Guelph, Ontario, which were the OHL Champions in 2003/2004.
- Stopped future team London Knights in their run to the 2004 Memorial Cup with his team the Guelph Storm in the OHL Western Conference Championship.
- London Knights hockey team in London, Ontario, which were the OHL and Memorial Cup Champions, 2005.
- Drafted by Buffalo Sabres in the sixth round (182nd overall) in the 2005 NHL entry draft.
- Played for the AHL's Rochester Americans as a rookie in 2007-2008.
- Posted his first professional shutout on Saturday, November 18, 2006, against the Springfield Falcons making 27 saves in net.
- Played for Team Italy in the 2014 Winter Olympic Qualifying Tournament
