= David Bolland =

David Bolland (1909–2012) is a British military officer, film maker and author, best known for his works on Kathakali.

He was born in Cairo, studied in Somerset and Worcester, served in the 53rd Welch Division as an officer in the Second World War, participated in the Normandy landings and was awarded MBE. After the war, he came to India and settled in Calicut, as an official of Pierce Leslie Co. He documented 146 Kathakali performances he watched in Kerala and made movies on Kathakali including a 43 minutes film titled Masque of Malabar. A shorter version of this, titled Malabar Masque received the Coupe de Casino Palm Beach at Cannes in 1975. These works are hosted in the archives of Rose Bruford College, Kent and included in the National Archives, UK.

He retired in 1971 and went back to UK and published A Guide to Kathakali, which many consider the best introduction on this art, in 1980. He was appointed an Officer of the Order of the British Empire (OBE) for his work in Kerala.
