= 2006–07 OHL season =

- League: Ontario Hockey League
- Sport: Hockey
- Duration: Regular season September 2006 – March 2007; Playoffs; March 2007 – May 2007
- Teams: 20
- TV partner(s): Rogers TV, TVCogeco

Draft
- Top draft pick: Steven Stamkos
- Picked by: Sarnia Sting

Regular season
- Hamilton Spectator Trophy: Kitchener Rangers (6)
- Season MVP: John Tavares (Oshawa Generals)
- Top scorer: Patrick Kane (London Knights)

Playoffs
- Playoffs MVP: Marc Staal (Wolves)
- Finals champions: Plymouth Whalers (1)
- Runners-up: Sudbury Wolves

OHL seasons
- 2005–06 2007–08

2006–07 CHL season
- League: Canadian Hockey League
- Sport: Hockey
- Duration: OHL; September 2006 – March 2007; QMJHL; September 2006 – March 2007; WHL; September 2006 – March 2007
- Teams: 60
- TV partner(s): RDS; Rogers Sportsnet; Rogers TV; Shaw TV
- Season MVP: John Tavares (Oshawa Generals) (OHL)
- Top scorer: Patrick Kane (London Knights) (OHL)

Memorial Cup
- Finals champions: Vancouver Giants (WHL) (1st title)
- Runners-up: Medicine Hat Tigers (WHL)

The 2006–07 OHL season was the 27th season of the Ontario Hockey League.

The OHL announced its new checking to the head rule, effective for this season. Also announced, the recently adopted National Hockey League rule on stick curvature was not implemented until 2007–08. The season commenced on September 21, 2006, and twenty teams each played 68 games. The Sault Ste. Marie Greyhounds moved from Sault Memorial Gardens (demolished in May 2006) into the new Steelback Centre, which opened October 11, 2006. The Oshawa Generals moved mid-season from the Oshawa Civic Auditorium to the General Motors Centre, on November 3, 2006. The Plymouth Whalers won the J. Ross Robertson Cup, defeating the Sudbury Wolves in the championship series.

== Regular season ==
=== Final standings ===
Note: DIV = Division; GP = Games played; W = Wins; L = Losses; OTL = Overtime losses; SL = Shootout losses; GF = Goals for; GA = Goals against; PTS = Points; x = clinched playoff berth; y = clinched division title; z = clinched conference title

=== Eastern conference ===
Rank	Team	DIV	GP	W	L	OTL	SL	PTS	GF	GA
1	z-Barrie Colts	Central	68	48	19	0	1	97	273	193
2	y-Belleville Bulls	East	68	39	24	0	5	83	260	227
3	x-Mississauga IceDogs	Central	68	43	21	0	4	90	326	251
4	x-Oshawa Generals	East	68	31	29	3	5	70	292	320
5	x-Kingston Frontenacs	East	68	31	30	5	2	69	269	284
6	x-Sudbury Wolves	Central	68	29	30	3	6	67	225	241
7	x-Ottawa 67's	East	68	30	34	0	4	64	242	263
8	x-Brampton Battalion	Central	68	27	36	1	4	59	214	277
9	Peterborough Petes	East	68	24	39	1	4	53	198	274
10	Toronto St. Michael's Majors	Central	68	20	41	4	3	47	225	325

=== Western conference ===
Rank	Team	DIV	GP	W	L	OTL	SL	PTS	GF	GA
1	z-London Knights	Midwest	68	50	14	1	3	104	311	231
2	y-Plymouth Whalers	West	68	49	14	2	3	103	299	173
3	x-Kitchener Rangers	Midwest	68	47	17	1	3	98	262	187
4	x-Saginaw Spirit	West	68	44	21	0	3	91	291	217
5	x-Sault Ste. Marie Greyhounds	West	68	37	23	1	7	82	227	219
6	x-Sarnia Sting	West	68	34	24	5	5	78	270	241
7	x-Guelph Storm	Midwest	68	33	23	3	9	78	215	200
8	x-Owen Sound Attack	Midwest	68	31	30	3	4	69	256	261
9	Windsor Spitfires	West	68	18	43	2	5	43	209	311
10	Erie Otters	Midwest	68	15	50	1	2	33	209	378

== Scoring leaders ==
Note: GP = Games played; G = Goals; A = Assists; Pts = Points; PIM = Penalty minutes

Player	Team	GP	G	A	Pts	PIM
Patrick Kane	London Knights	58	62	83	145	52
John Tavares	Oshawa Generals	67	72	62	134	60
Sergei Kostitsyn	London Knights	59	40	91	131	76
Tyler Donati	Belleville Bulls	66	55	74	129	52
Sam Gagner	London Knights	53	35	83	118	36
Bryan Little	Barrie Colts	57	41	66	107	77
Evan Brophey	Plymouth Whalers	68	36	71	107	91
Bobby Ryan	Owen Sound Attack	63	43	59	102	66
Brett MacLean	Oshawa Generals	68	47	53	100	43
Bobby Hughes	Kingston Frontenacs	59	40	56	96	76

== Leading goaltenders ==
Note: GP = Games played; Mins = Minutes played; W = Wins; L = Losses: OTL = Overtime losses; SL = Shootout losses; GA = Goals Allowed; SO = Shutouts; GAA = Goals against average

Player	Team	GP	Mins	W	L	OTL	SL	GA	SO	Sv%	GAA
Michal Neuvirth	Plymouth Whalers	41	2223	26	8	2	2	86	4	0.932	2.32
Tom McCollum	Guelph Storm	55	3158	26	18	3	7	126	5	0.918	2.39
John Murray	Kitchener Rangers	55	3121	40	9	1	2	134	5	0.909	2.58
Jeremy Smith	Plymouth Whalers	34	1901	23	6	0	1	82	4	0.923	2.59
Andrew Perugini	Barrie Colts	57	3304	40	16	0	1	156	4	0.917	2.83

== CHL Canada/Russia Series ==
The 2006 ADT Canada-Russia Challenge between the OHL and the Russian team was hosted by the Sarnia Sting on November 23, 2006, and by the Oshawa Generals on November 27, 2006. The OHL won the first game 5–0, and the second game 4–3.

== All-Star Classic ==
The All-Star Classic was played on January 31, 2007, at the Dow Event Center in Saginaw, Michigan. The Eastern Conference defeated the Western Conference 13–9 in the game attended by 5,527 spectators. The top scorers were Hunter Tremblay (Barrie Colts) and Sam Gagner (London Knights), each with five points. The Eastern Conference also prevailed 15–13 in the skills competition held the night before.

== Playoffs ==
List of complete playoffs results.

Conference quarterfinals
E1	Barrie	4
E8	Brampton	0
E3	Mississauga	1
E6	Sudbury	4
E2	Belleville	4
E7	Ottawa	1
E4	Oshawa	4
E5	Kingston	1
W1	London	4
W8	Owen Sound	0
W4	Saginaw	2
W5	S.S. Marie	4
W2	Plymouth	4
W7	Guelph	0
W3	Kitchener	4
W6	Sarnia	0

Conference semifinals
E1	Barrie	0
E6	Sudbury	4
E2	Belleville	4
E4	Oshawa	0
W1	London	4
W5	S.S. Marie	3
W2	Plymouth	4
W3	Kitchener	1

Conference finals
E6	Sudbury	4
E2	Belleville	2
W1	London	1
W2	Plymouth	4

Finals
E6	Sudbury	2
W2	Plymouth	4

=== Conference quarterfinals ===
==== (E1) Barrie Colts vs. (E8) Brampton Battalion ====
March 24	Barrie Colts	4 – 2	Brampton Battalion	Barrie Molson Centre

March 25	Brampton Battalion	2 – 3	2OT	Barrie Colts	Powerade Centre

March 27	Barrie Colts	4 – 1	Brampton Battalion	Barrie Molson Centre

March 29	Brampton Battalion	4 – 5	OT	Barrie Colts	Powerade Centre

Barrie wins series 4 – 0

==== (E2) Belleville Bulls vs. (E7) Ottawa 67's ====
March 26	Belleville Bulls	3 – 4	OT	Ottawa 67's	Yardmen Arena

March 27	Ottawa 67's	4 – 5	Belleville Bulls	Ottawa Civic Centre

March 29	Belleville Bulls	3 – 0	Ottawa 67's	Yardmen Arena

March 30	Ottawa 67's	2 – 4	Belleville Bulls	Ottawa Civic Centre

April 1	Belleville Bulls	4 – 3	OT	Ottawa 67's	Yardmen Arena

Belleville wins series 4 – 1

==== (E3) Mississauga IceDogs vs. (E6) Sudbury Wolves ====
March 23	Mississauga IceDogs	4 – 5	Sudbury Wolves	Hershey Centre
16:40 - Stefan Legein (1)		First period	Matt Dias (1) - pp - 5:29
18:31 - pp - Jean-Michel Rizk (1)		Second period	Marc Staal (1) - 2:46; Gerome Giudice (1) - 14:41
4:23 - Oskar Osala (1); 17:56 - Luca Caputi (1)		Third period	Justin Donati (1) - 4:58; Andrew Self (1) - 7:16
Andrew Loverock (27 saves / 32 shots)		Goalie stats	Sebastian Dahm (40 saves / 44 shots)

March 25	Mississauga IceDogs	4 – 3	Sudbury Wolves	Hershey Centre
17:07 - pp - Oskar Osala (2)		First period	Kevin Baker (1) - 13:29
6:26 - Chris Lawrence (1); 18:20 - Jean-Michel Rizk (2)		Second period	Andrew Self (2) - 4:40; Kevin Baker (2) - pp - 6:09
13:46 - pp - Chris Lawrence (2)		Third period	No scoring
Andrew Loverock (37 saves / 40 shots)		Goalie stats	Sebastian Dahm (33 saves / 37 shots)

March 27	Sudbury Wolves	3 – 1	Mississauga IceDogs	Sudbury Community Arena
No scoring		First period	Luca Caputi (2) - 13:56
9:29 - Zach McCullough (1); 12:06 - Nick Foligno (1)		Second period	No scoring
19:59 - en - Andrew Self (3)		Third period	No scoring
Sebastian Dahm (21 saves / 22 shots)		Goalie stats	Andrew Loverock (34 saves / 36 shots)

March 29	Sudbury Wolves	6 – 3	Mississauga IceDogs	Sudbury Community Arena
6:40 - pp - Justin Donati (2)		First period	Chris Lawrence (3) - pp - 15:11
2:55 - Marc Staal (2); 4:44 - sh - Nick Foligno (2); 8:11 - Andrew Self (4); 17:47 - Patrik Lušňák (1)		Second period	Jordan Owens (1) - 5:45
No scoring		Third period	Stefan Legein (2) - 3:31
Sebastian Dahm (32 saves / 35 shots)		Goalie stats	Andrew Loverock (29 saves / 35 shots)

April 1	Mississauga IceDogs	3 – 6	Sudbury Wolves	Hershey Centre
No scoring		First period	Matt Dias (2) - pp - 10:41; Justin Donati (3) - pp - 13:22; Nick Foligno (4) - 19:05
7:05 - Jean-Michel Rizk (3); 10:15 - Nathan Martine (1)		Second period	Gerome Giudice (2) - 15:22
5:46 - Stefan Legein (3)		Third period	Justin Donati (4) - 5:51; Devin DiDiomete (1) - en - 19:18
Andrew Loverock (23 saves / 28 shots)		Goalie stats	Sebastian Dahm (38 saves / 41 shots)

Sudbury wins series 4 – 1

==== (E4) Oshawa Generals vs. (E5) Kingston Frontenacs ====
March 23	Oshawa Generals	3 – 2	OT	Kingston Frontenacs	General Motors Centre

March 25	Kingston Frontenacs	6 – 7	OT	Oshawa Generals	Kingston Memorial Centre

March 27	Oshawa Generals	7 – 4	Kingston Frontenacs	General Motors Centre

March 29	Kingston Frontenacs	8 – 2	Oshawa Generals	Kingston Memorial Centre

March 30	Oshawa Generals	4 – 2	OT	Kingston Frontenacs	General Motors Centre

Oshawa wins series 4 – 1

==== (W1) London Knights vs. (W8) Owen Sound Attack ====
March 23	London Knights	6 – 3	Owen Sound Attack	John Labatt Centre
4:31 - David Meckler (1); 7:50 - pp - David Meckler (2)		First period	Bobby Ryan (1) - sh - 13:47
17:03 - pp - Patrick Kane (1)		Second period	Howie Martin (1) - pp - 9:02; Trevor Lewis (1) - pp - 19:36
9:47 - David Meckler (3); 18:40 - pp - Patrick Kane (2); 19:30 - en - David Meckler (4)		Third period	No scoring
Steve Mason (45 saves / 48 shots)		Goalie stats	Anthony Guadagnolo (18 saves / 23 shots)

March 24	Owen Sound Attack	1 – 2	OT	London Knights	Harry Lumley Bayshore Community Centre
Lane MacDermid (1) - 17:31		First period		18:40 - Sam Gagner (1)
No scoring		Second period		No scoring
No scoring		Third period		No scoring
No scoring		First overtime period		4:41 - Matt Clarke (1)
Anthony Guadagnolo (24 saves / 26 shots)		Goalie stats		Steve Mason (61 saves / 62 shots)

March 27	London Knights	6 – 3	Owen Sound Attack	John Labatt Centre
Sergei Kostitsyn (1) - 12:29		First period	2:20 - pp - Wayne Simmonds (1); 9:04 - Scott Tregunna (1)
Patrick Kane (3) - 2:40; Sergei Kostitsyn (2) - 15:11		Second period	1:37 - Scott Tregunna (2)
Adam Perry (1) - 0:20; Sergei Kostitsyn (3) - 1:09; David Meckler (5) - 17:35		Third period	No scoring
Steve Mason (45 saves / 48 shots)		Goalie stats	Anthony Guadagnolo (28 saves / 34 shots)

March 29	Owen Sound Attack	5 – 8	London Knights	Harry Lumley Bayshore Community Centre
6:52 - pp - Elgin Reid (1); 19:06 - pp - Bobby Sanguinetti (1); 19:44 - pp - Scott Tregunna (3)		First period	Patrick Kane (4) - pp - 3:15; David Meckler (6) - 12:49
No scoring		Second period	Justin Taylor (1) - 4:49; Patrick Kane (5) - sh - 13:17; Patrick Kane (6) - pp - 16:07; Ryan Martinelli (1) - 19:03
9:26 - Bobby Sanguinetti (2); 18:35 - Bobby Sanguinetti (3)		Third period	Adam Perry (2) - 6:10; Sergei Kostitsyn (4) - en - 19:39
Anthony Guadagnolo (8 saves / 14 shots); Neil Conway (3 saves / 4 shots)		Goalie stats	Steve Mason (42 saves / 47 shots)

London wins series 4 – 0

==== (W4) Saginaw Spirit vs. (W5) Sault Ste. Marie Greyhounds ====
March 23	Saginaw Spirit	4 – 3	Sault Ste. Marie Greyhounds	Dow Event Center

March 24	Saginaw Spirit	1 – 5	Sault Ste. Marie Greyhounds	Dow Event Center

March 27	Sault Ste. Marie Greyhounds	2 – 1	Saginaw Spirit	Steelback Centre

March 28	Sault Ste. Marie Greyhounds	5 – 3	Saginaw Spirit	Steelback Centre

March 30	Saginaw Spirit	7 – 1	Sault Ste. Marie Greyhounds	Dow Event Center

April 1	Sault Ste. Marie Greyhounds	4 – 3	OT	Saginaw Spirit	Steelback Centre

Sault Ste. Marie wins series 4 – 2

==== (W2) Plymouth Whalers vs. (W7) Guelph Storm ====
March 24	Plymouth Whalers	3 – 2	OT	Guelph Storm	Compuware Arena
10:08 - Sean O'Connor (1)		First period		Jamie Arniel (1) - 0:50; Matt Kennedy (1) - 17:05
No scoring		Second period		No scoring
13:21 - Daniel Ryder (1)		Third period		No scoring
2:14 - Evan Brophey (1)		First overtime period		No scoring
Michal Neuvirth (32 saves / 34 shots)		Goalie stats		Tom McCollum (23 saves / 26 shots)

March 25	Guelph Storm	3 – 5	Plymouth Whalers	Guelph Sports and Entertainment Centre
Ryan Pottruff (1) - pp - 10:26; Jamie Arniel (2) - pp - 17:26		First period	No scoring
Drew Doughty (1) - pp - 2:55		Second period	9:05 - Dan Collins (1); 9:43 - Dan Collins (2); 10:57 - James Neal (1); 14:24 - pp - Sean O'Connor (2)
No scoring		Third period	10:42 - pp - Tom Sestito (1)
Tom McCollum (43 saves / 48 shots)		Goalie stats	Jeremy Smith (25 saves / 28 shots)

March 27	Plymouth Whalers	7 – 1	Guelph Storm	Compuware Arena
Jared Boll (1) - 7:19; James Neal (2) - 13:49; Daniel Ryder (2) - pp - 19:44		First period	No scoring
Tom Sestito (2) - pp - 11:48		Second period	2:53 - pp - Rafael Rotter (1)
Sean O'Connor (3) - pp - 3:41; Tom Sestito (3) - pp - 8:26; Tom Sestito (4) - pp - 17:18		Third period	No scoring
Michal Neuvirth (34 saves / 35 shots)		Goalie stats	Tom McCollum (44 saves / 50 shots); Cody St. Jacques (7 saves / 8 shots)

March 29	Guelph Storm	2 – 3	Plymouth Whalers	Guelph Sports and Entertainment Centre
6:00 - pp - Drew Doughty (2); 17:13 - Luke Pither (1)		First period	No scoring
No scoring		Second period	James Neal (3) - 10:36
No scoring		Third period	James Neal (4) - pp - 9:29; Daniel Ryder (3) - 19:33
Tom McCollum (28 saves / 31 shots)		Goalie stats	Jeremy Smith (20 saves / 22 shots)

Plymouth wins series 4 – 0

==== (W3) Kitchener Rangers vs. (W6) Sarnia Sting ====
March 24	Kitchener Rangers	6 – 4	Sarnia Sting	Kitchener Memorial Auditorium

March 25	Sarnia Sting	3 – 4	Kitchener Rangers	Sarnia Sports and Entertainment Centre

March 27	Kitchener Rangers	3 – 2	Sarnia Sting	Kitchener Memorial Auditorium

March 29	Sarnia Sting	5 – 7	Kitchener Rangers	Sarnia Sports and Entertainment Centre

Kitchener wins series 4 – 0

=== Conference semifinals ===
==== (E1) Barrie Colts vs. (E6) Sudbury Wolves ====
April 5	Barrie Colts	3 – 4	OT	Sudbury Wolves	Barrie Molson Centre
1:50 - Matthew Bragg (1); 2:36 - Vladimir Nikiforov (2); 5:33 - pp - Richard Clune (2)		First period		Andrew Self (5) - 4:14; Nick Foligno (5) - pp - 6:56; Nick Foligno (6) - 15:05
No scoring		Second period		No scoring
No scoring		Third period		No scoring
No scoring		First overtime period		Justin Donati (5) - 12:23
Andrew Perugini (37 saves / 41 shots)		Goalie stats		Sebastian Dahm (46 saves / 49 shots)

April 7	Sudbury Wolves	4 – 3	2OT	Barrie Colts	Sudbury Community Arena
No scoring		First period		No scoring
Nick Foligno (7) - 5:33; Marc Staal (3) - pp - 11:13		Second period		0:24 - Michael Lombardi (2)
Marc Staal (4) - 6:28		Third period		17:05 - Vladimir Nikiforov (3); 19:27 - Hunter Tremblay (5)
Zach McCullough (2) - pp - 13:15		Second overtime period		No scoring
Sebastian Dahm (49 saves / 52 shots)		Goalie stats		Andrew Perugini (43 saves / 47 shots)

April 9	Barrie Colts	2 – 3	OT	Sudbury Wolves	Barrie Molson Centre
No scoring		First period		No scoring
Matthew Bragg (2) - 12:49; Bryan Little (4) - pp - 19:02		Second period		6:12 - pp - Jonathan D'Aversa (1); 15:42 - Gerome Giudice (3)
No scoring		Third period		No scoring
No scoring		First overtime period		3:42 - Devin DiDiomete (2)
Andrew Perugini (30 saves / 33 shots)		Goalie stats		Sebastian Dahm (55 saves / 57 shots)

April 11	Sudbury Wolves	4 – 2	Barrie Colts	Sudbury Community Arena
15:36 - pp - Justin Donati (6)		First period	No scoring
15:51 - pp - Nick Foligno (8)		Second period	Richard Clune (3) - pp - 2:21; Nick Plastino (3) - 18:52
11:42 - Justin Donati (7); 19:18 - en - Matt Dias (3)		Third period	No scoring
Sebastian Dahm (36 saves / 38 shots)		Goalie stats	Andrew Perugini (28 saves / 31 shots)

Sudbury wins series 4 – 0

==== (E2) Belleville Bulls vs. (E4) Oshawa Generals ====
April 6	Belleville Bulls	7 – 5	Oshawa Generals	Yardmen Arena
0:35 - Shawn Matthias (6); 15:18 - Shawn Matthias (7); 19:01 - Eric Tangradi (4)		First period	Cal Clutterbuck (6) - pp - 10:09
4:10 - Eric Tangradi (5); 18:53 - Shawn Matthias (8)		Second period	Cal Clutterbuck (7) - pp - 1:28; Michael Del Zotto (2) - 10:33
1:06 - pp - Tyler Donati (3); 18:51 - en - Cory Tanaka (2)		Third period	Michael Del Zotto (3) - pp - 9:56; John Tavares (4) - pp - 14:20
Kevin Lalande (41 saves / 46 shots)		Goalie stats	Loïc Lacasse (30 saves / 36 shots)

April 8	Oshawa Generals	2 – 5	Belleville Bulls	General Motors Centre

April 10	Belleville Bulls	6 – 4	Oshawa Generals	Yardmen Arena

April 11	Oshawa Generals	2 – 5	Belleville Bulls	General Motors Centre

Belleville wins series 4 – 0

==== (W1) London Knights vs. (W5) Sault Ste. Marie Greyhounds ====
April 5	London Knights	3 – 1	Sault Ste. Marie Greyhounds	John Labatt Centre
No scoring		First period	Dustin Jeffrey (2) - 15:19
No scoring		Second period	No scoring
11:04 - Sam Gagner (2); 15:04 - Sam Gagner (3); 19:50 - pp - en - Sergei Kostitsyn (5)		Third period	No scoring
Steve Mason (30 saves / 31 shots)		Goalie stats	Kyle Gajewski (35 saves / 37 shots)

April 6	London Knights	4 – 1	Sault Ste. Marie Greyhounds	John Labatt Centre
10:00 - pp - David Meckler (7); 15:19 - Justin Taylor (2); 19:42 - Sergei Kostitsyn (6)		First period	Dustin Jeffrey (3) - pp - 1:33
13:23 - pp - Sam Gagner (4)		Second period	No scoring
No scoring		Third period	No scoring
Steve Mason (35 saves / 36 shots)		Goalie stats	Kyle Gajewski (29 saves / 33 shots)

April 9	Sault Ste. Marie Greyhounds	5 – 6	OT	London Knights	Steelback Centre
9:08 - sh - Cody Thornton (2)		First period		Patrick Kane (7) - 6:35; Justin Taylor (3) - 18:49
10:25 - Josh Godfrey (8)		Second period		David Meckler (8) - pp - 6:12; David Meckler (9) - pp - 13:57; David Meckler (10) - pp - 17:01
2:41 - pp - Jiří Tlustý (6); 9:28 - pp - Dustin Jeffrey (4); 14:27 - pp - Chris MacKinnon (1)		Third period		No scoring
No scoring		First overtime period		Robbie Drummond (1) - 8:45
Kyle Gajewski (20 saves / 26 shots)		Goalie stats		Steve Mason (27 saves / 32 shots)

April 10	Sault Ste. Marie Greyhounds	3 – 0	London Knights	Steelback Centre
9:49 - pp - David Kuchejda (3); 18:11 - Dustin Jeffrey (5)		First period	No scoring
No scoring		Second period	No scoring
4:12 - pp - Josh Godfrey (9)		Third period	No scoring
Kyle Gajewski (33 saves / 33 shots)		Goalie stats	Steve Mason (24 saves / 27 shots)

April 13	London Knights	2 – 5	Sault Ste. Marie Greyhounds	John Labatt Centre
No scoring		First period	No scoring
5:04 - Todd Perry (1); 11:23 - Patrick Kane (8)		Second period	Jiří Tlustý (7) - 6:51; Andrew Desjardins (1) - pp - 10:48
No scoring		Third period	Jacob Lalonde (1) - 2:36; Matthew Lyall (1) - 15:17; Jiří Tlustý (8) - en - 19:50
Steve Mason (22 saves / 26 shots)		Goalie stats	Kyle Gajewski (41 saves / 43 shots)

April 15	Sault Ste. Marie Greyhounds	5 – 4	London Knights	Steelback Centre
11:12 - Chris MacKinnon (2); 18:38 - Dustin Jeffrey (6)		First period	Jordan Foreman (1) - 9:11
3:35 - pp - Chris MacKinnon (3); 7:44 - Cody Thornton (3); 18:55 - Brad Good (1)		Second period	Corbin Crawford (1) - 13:24
No scoring		Third period	David Meckler (11) - 9:02; Sam Gagner (5) - pp - 16:56
Kyle Gajewski (26 saves / 30 shots)		Goalie stats	Steve Mason (22 saves / 27 shots); Stéphane César (10 saves / 10 shots)

April 16	London Knights	8 – 4	Sault Ste. Marie Greyhounds	John Labatt Centre
3:16 - Robbie Drummond (2); 12:09 - Patrick Kane (9); 13:23 - Josh Beaulieu (1); 19:00 - pp - Robbie Drummond (3)		First period	No scoring
No scoring		Second period	Brad Good (2) - 7:29; Andrew Desjardins (2) - 10:38
1:02 - pp - David Meckler (12); 7:03 - pp - David Meckler (13); 17:58 - Justin Taylor (4); 18:30 - en - Todd Perry (2)		Third period	David Kuchejda (4) - pp - 2:11; Jiří Tlustý (9) - pp - 13:22
Steve Mason (38 saves / 42 shots)		Goalie stats	Kyle Gajewski (24 saves / 31 shots)

London wins series 4 – 3

==== (W2) Plymouth Whalers vs. (W3) Kitchener Rangers ====
April 6	Plymouth Whalers	6 – 5	OT	Kitchener Rangers	Compuware Arena
3:07 - Chris Terry (1); 9:59 - sh - Tom Sestito (5)		First period		Steve Downie (4) - 14:16
8:50 - James Neal (5); 19:26 - Daniel Ryder (4)		Second period		Victor Oreskovich (1) - 16:33
13:42 - pp - James Neal (6)		Third period		Yannick Weber (2) - pp - 8:45; Steve Downie (5) - pp - 9:16; Yannick Weber (3) - pp - 12:30
6:25 - sh - Evan Brophey (2)		First overtime period		No scoring
Michal Neuvirth (50 saves / 55 shots)		Goalie stats		John Murray (28 saves / 34 shots)

April 8	Kitchener Rangers	2 – 3	Plymouth Whalers	Kitchener Memorial Auditorium

April 10	Plymouth Whalers	5 – 4	OT	Kitchener Rangers	Compuware Arena

April 11	Kitchener Rangers	4 – 2	Plymouth Whalers	Kitchener Memorial Auditorium

April 13	Plymouth Whalers	4 – 1	Kitchener Rangers	Compuware Arena

Plymouth wins series 4 – 1

=== Conference finals ===
==== (E2) Belleville Bulls vs. (E6) Sudbury Wolves ====
April 18	Belleville Bulls	3 – 2	Sudbury Wolves	Yardmen Arena

April 19	Belleville Bulls	2 – 3	OT	Sudbury Wolves	Yardmen Arena

April 22	Sudbury Wolves	1 – 2	OT	Belleville Bulls	Sudbury Community Arena

April 23	Sudbury Wolves	3 – 2	OT	Belleville Bulls	Sudbury Community Arena

April 25	Belleville Bulls	1 – 4	Sudbury Wolves	Yardmen Arena

April 27	Sudbury Wolves	4 – 3	3OT	Belleville Bulls	Sudbury Community Arena

Sudbury wins series 4 – 2

==== (W1) London Knights vs. (W2) Plymouth Whalers ====
April 19	London Knights	1 – 5	Plymouth Whalers	John Labatt Centre
11:28 - pp - David Meckler (14)		First period	No scoring
No scoring		Second period	James Neal (8) - 7:27; Evan Brophey (5) - 18:23
No scoring		Third period	Jared Boll (2) - 0:20; Evan Brophey (6) - pp - 10:02; Vern Cooper (1) - 18:05
Steve Mason (48 saves / 53 shots)		Goalie stats	Michal Neuvirth (29 saves / 30 shots)

April 20	Plymouth Whalers	5 – 1	London Knights	Compuware Arena
Dan Collins (4) - 1:24		First period	No scoring
Jared Boll (3) - 9:01		Second period	No scoring
Tom Sestito (8) - 4:24; Tom Sestito (9) - 13:31; James Neal (9) - pp - 16:53		Third period	11:07 - pp - Sergei Kostitsyn (7)
Michal Neuvirth (36 saves / 37 shots)		Goalie stats	Steve Mason (35 saves / 40 shots)

April 23	London Knights	2 – 5	Plymouth Whalers	John Labatt Centre
Sergei Kostitsyn (8) - 6:00		First period	No scoring
No scoring		Second period	5:07 - pp - Sean O'Connor (4); 12:09 - pp - Daniel Ryder (7); 14:08 - James Neal (10)
Josh Beaulieu (2) - pp - 9:44		Third period	2:06 - Ryan McGinnis (1); 3:00 - Sean O'Connor (5)
Steve Mason (31 saves / 35 shots); Stéphane César (10 saves / 11 shots)		Goalie stats	Michal Neuvirth (34 saves / 36 shots)

April 24	Plymouth Whalers	2 – 5	London Knights	Compuware Arena
17:06 - pp - Evan Brophey (7)		First period	No scoring
No scoring		Second period	Sam Gagner (6) - pp - 4:50; Patrick Kane (10) - pp - 7:26; Sam Gagner (7) - 16:07
14:23 - pp - Steve Ward (1)		Third period	Josh Beaulieu (3) - pp - 10:39; David Meckler (15) - en - 19:09
Michal Neuvirth (40 saves / 44 shots)		Goalie stats	Steve Mason (50 saves / 52 shots)

April 26	London Knights	1 – 4	Plymouth Whalers	John Labatt Centre
No scoring		First period	Tom Sestito (10) - pp - 3:05; Dan Collins (5) - pp - 8:19
No scoring		Second period	Wes Cunningham (1) - sh - 18:18
No scoring		Third period	Dan Collins (6) - en - 19:12
Steve Mason (26 saves / 29 shots)		Goalie stats	Michal Neuvirth (45 saves / 46 shots)

Plymouth wins series 4 – 1

=== J. Ross Robertson Cup ===
==== (W2) Plymouth Whalers vs. (E6) Sudbury Wolves ====
May 4	Plymouth Whalers	4 – 1	Sudbury Wolves	Compuware Arena

May 6	Plymouth Whalers	3 – 7	Sudbury Wolves	Compuware Arena

May 8	Sudbury Wolves	5 – 4	OT	Plymouth Whalers	Sudbury Community Arena

May 9	Sudbury Wolves	1 – 3	Plymouth Whalers	Sudbury Community Arena

May 11	Plymouth Whalers	4 – 3	OT	Sudbury Wolves	Compuware Arena

May 13	Sudbury Wolves	2 – 3	OT	Plymouth Whalers	Sudbury Community Arena

Plymouth wins series 4 – 2

=== J. Ross Robertson Cup Champions Roster ===
2006-07 Plymouth Whalers
Goaltenders: (China) / (United States) 30 – Jeremy Smith; (Czech Republic) 40 – Michal Neuvirth	Defencemen: (Canada) 2 – Brett Bellemore; (Canada) 3 – Wes Cunningham; (Canada) 4 – Leo Jenner; (Slovakia) 5 – Jozef Sládok; (Canada) 6 – Steve Whitely; (United States) 10 – Ryan McGinnis; (Canada) 26 – Steve Ward - C; (Canada) 28 – Zack Shepley; (Canada) 34 – Jordan O'Neill	Wingers: (United States) 11 – Jared Boll; (Canada) 12 – Kaine Geldart; (United States) 13 – Sean O'Connor; (Canada) 16 – Brett Valliquette; (United States) 17 – Dan Collins; (Canada) 19 – James Neal; (United States) 21 – Tom Sestito; (United States) 22 – A.J. Jenks; (Canada) 23 – Joe McCann; (Canada) 25 – Joe Gaynor	Centres: (Canada) 9 – Vern Cooper; (Canada) 11 – Evan Brophey; (Canada) 15 – Andrew Fournier; (Canada) 20 – Chris Terry; (Canada) 27 – Daniel Ryder; Coach: (United States) Mike Vellucci; General Manager: (United States) Mike Vellucci

== Awards ==
J. Ross Robertson Cup:	Plymouth Whalers
Hamilton Spectator Trophy:	London Knights
Bobby Orr Trophy:	Sudbury Wolves
Wayne Gretzky Trophy:	Plymouth Whalers
Emms Trophy:	Barrie Colts
Leyden Trophy:	Belleville Bulls
Holody Trophy:	London Knights
Bumbacco Trophy:	Plymouth Whalers
Red Tilson Trophy:	John Tavares, Oshawa Generals
Eddie Powers Memorial Trophy:	Patrick Kane, London Knights
Matt Leyden Trophy:	Mike Vellucci, Plymouth Whalers
Jim Mahon Memorial Trophy:	Patrick Kane, London Knights
Max Kaminsky Trophy:	Marc Staal, Sudbury Wolves
OHL Goaltender of the Year:	Steve Mason, London Knights
Jack Ferguson Award:	Ryan O'Reilly, Erie Otters
Dave Pinkney Trophy:	Michal Neuvirth & Jeremy Smith, Plymouth Whalers
OHL Executive of the Year:	Craig Goslin, Saginaw Spirit
Emms Family Award:	Patrick Kane, London Knights
F.W. "Dinty" Moore Trophy:	Michal Neuvirth, Plymouth Whalers
Dan Snyder Memorial Trophy:	Andrew Gibbons, Belleville Bulls
William Hanley Trophy:	Tom Pyatt, Saginaw Spirit
Leo Lalonde Memorial Trophy:	Tyler Donati, Belleville Bulls
Bobby Smith Trophy:	Steven Stamkos, Sarnia Sting
Roger Neilson Memorial Award:	Derrick Bagshaw, Erie Otters
Ivan Tennant Memorial Award:	Andrew Shorkey, Owen Sound Attack
Tim Adams Memorial Trophy:	Casey Cizikas, Mississauga IceDogs
Wayne Gretzky 99 Award:	Marc Staal, Sudbury Wolves

== All-Star teams ==
=== First team ===
- John Tavares, Centre, Oshawa Generals
- James Neal, Left Wing, Plymouth Whalers
- Patrick Kane, Right Wing, London Knights
- Marc Staal, Defence, Sudbury Wolves
- Drew Doughty, Defence, Guelph Storm
- Steve Mason, Goaltender, London Knights
- Mike Vellucci, Coach, Plymouth Whalers

=== Second team ===
- Bryan Little, Centre, Barrie Colts
- Brett MacLean, Left Wing, Oshawa Generals
- Tyler Donati, Right Wing, Belleville Bulls
- Jakub Kindl, Defence, Kitchener Rangers
- Ryan Parent, Defence, Guelph Storm
- Michal Neuvirth, Goaltender, Plymouth Whalers
- Mike Kelly, Coach, Mississauga IceDogs

=== Third team ===
- Sam Gagner, Centre, London Knights
- Jamie McGinn, Left Wing, Ottawa 67's
- Sergei Kostitsyn, Right Wing, London Knights
- Alex Pietrangelo, Defence, Mississauga IceDogs
- Patrick McNeill, Defence, Saginaw Spirit
- Thomas McCollum, Goaltender, Guelph Storm
- Dave Barr, Coach, Guelph Storm

== 2007 OHL Priority Selection ==
On May 5, 2007, the OHL conducted the 2007 Ontario Hockey League Priority Selection. The Erie Otters held the first overall pick in the draft, and selected Ryan O'Reilly from the Toronto Jr. Canadiens. O'Reilly was awarded the Jack Ferguson Award, awarded to the top pick in the draft.

Below are the players who were selected in the first round of the 2007 Ontario Hockey League Priority Selection.

#	Player	Nationality	OHL team	Hometown	Minor team
1	Ryan O'Reilly (C)	Canada	Erie Otters	Varna, Ontario	Toronto Jr. Canadiens
2	Taylor Hall (LW)	Canada	Windsor Spitfires	Kingston, Ontario	Kingston Minor Midget
3	Casey Cizikas (C)	Canada	Toronto St. Michael's Majors	Mississauga, Ontario	Mississauga Reps
4	Zack Kassian (RW)	Canada	Peterborough Petes	Belle River, Ontario	Windsor AAA Zone
5	Matt Duchene (C)	Canada	Brampton Battalion	Haliburton, Ontario	Central Ontario Wolves
6	Michael Latta (C)	Canada	Ottawa 67's	St. Clements, Ontario	Waterloo Wolves
7	Daniel Maggio (RW)	Canada	Sudbury Wolves	LaSalle, Ontario	Windsor AAA Zone
8	Joey Hishon (C)	Canada	Owen Sound Attack	Stratford, Ontario	Stratford Major Midget
9	Ethan Werek (C)	Canada	Kingston Frontenacs	Goodwood, Ontario	Toronto Marlboros
10	Justin Shugg (RW)	Canada	Oshawa Generals	Niagara Falls, Ontario	Niagara Rivermen
11	Peter Holland (C)	Canada	Guelph Storm	Caledon, Ontario	Brampton '45s
12	Colt Kennedy (RW)	Canada	Sarnia Sting	Ajax, Ontario	Ajax-Pickering Raiders
13	Jordan Mayer (C)	Canada	Sault Ste. Marie Greyhounds	Kingston, Ontario	Kingston Minor Midget
14	Tyler Randell (RW)	Canada	Belleville Bulls	Brampton, Ontario	Brampton '45s
15	Andrew Agozzino (LW)	Canada	Mississauga IceDogs	Kleinburg, Ontario	Mississauga Reps
16	Daniel Pachis (C)	Canada	Saginaw Spirit	Whitby, Ontario	Whitby Wildcats
17	Mitch Lebar (RW)	Canada	Barrie Colts	Aurora, Ontario	Toronto Nationals
18	Cam Fowler (D)	United States	Kitchener Rangers	Farmington Hills, Michigan	Detroit Honeybaked 16U
19	Beau Schmitz (D)	United States	Plymouth Whalers	Howell, Michigan	Detroit Belle Tire 16U
20	Michael Zador (G)	Canada	London Knights	Toronto, Ontario	Toronto Marlboros

== 2007 CHL Import Draft ==
On June 27, 2007, the Canadian Hockey League conducted the 2007 CHL Import Draft, in which teams in all three CHL leagues participate in. The Erie Otters held the first pick in the draft by a team in the OHL, and selected Jaroslav Janus from Slovakia with their selection.

Below are the players who were selected in the first round by Ontario Hockey League teams in the 2007 CHL Import Draft.

#	Player	Nationality	OHL team	Hometown	Minor team
2	Jaroslav Janus (G)	Slovakia	Erie Otters	Prešov, Slovakia	Bratislava Slovan Jr.
5	Mikkel Boedker (LW)	Denmark	Kitchener Rangers	Brondby, Denmark	Vastra Frolunda HC Jr.
8	Michal Jordan (D)	Czech Republic	Windsor Spitfires	Zlín, Czech Republic	Zlin Jr.
11	Vladimir Roth (D)	Czech Republic	London Knights	Prague, Czech Republic	Slavia Praha Jr. B
14	Alexander Eriksson (D)	Sweden	Brampton Battalion	Umeå, Sweden	Bjorkloven Jr.
17	Radim Ostrcil (D)	Czech Republic	Ottawa 67's	Vsetín, Czech Republic	Vsetin HC Petra
20	Jaroslav Hertl (D)	Czech Republic	Brampton Battalion	Prague, Czech Republic	Slavia Praha Jr.
23	Milan Doczy (D)	Czech Republic	Owen Sound Attack	Zlín, Czech Republic	Trinec HC Zelenzarny Jr.
26	Andris Dzerins (LW)	Latvia	Kingston Frontenacs	Jekabpils, Latvia	Lukko Rauma Jr.
29	Jakub Kovar (G)	Czech Republic	Oshawa Generals	Písek, Czech Republic	Ceske Budejovice HC
32	Denis Hollenstein (LW)	Switzerland	Guelph Storm	Zürich, Switzerland	Kloten EHC Sports AG Jr.
35	Tomi Karhunen (G)	Finland	Sarnia Sting	Joensuu, Finland	Karpat Oulu Jr.
38	Martin Paryzek (D)	Czech Republic	Ottawa 67's	České Budějovice, Czech Republic	Ceske Budejovice Jr.
41	Marek Indra (LW)	Czech Republic	Sarnia Sting	Prague, Czech Republic	Slavia Praha Jr.
44	Dalimir Jancovic (C/LW)	Slovakia	Niagara IceDogs	Martin, Slovakia	Martin Jr.
47	Andre Petersson (RW)	Sweden	Mississauga St. Michael's Majors	Tingsryd, Sweden	HV 71 J18A
50	Jaroslav Kruzik (D)	Czech Republic	Barrie Colts	Jihlava, Czech Republic	Kladno Jr. B
53	Ondrej Pekarik (C)	Czech Republic	Owen Sound Attack	Příbram, Czech Republic	Sparta Praha Jr.
56	Simon Fischhaber (C)	Germany	Sault Ste. Marie Greyhounds	Greiling, Germany	Bad Tolz EC Jr.
58	Heikki Hyvonen (D)	Finland	London Knights	Espoo, Finland	Jokerit Helsinki Jr.

== 2007 NHL entry draft ==
On June 22–23, 2007, the National Hockey League conducted the 2007 NHL entry draft held at Nationwide Arena in Columbus, Ohio. In total, 35 players from the Ontario Hockey League were selected in the draft. Patrick Kane of the London Knights was the first player from the OHL to be selected, as he was taken with the first overall pick by the Chicago Blackhawks.

Below are the players selected from OHL teams at the NHL Entry Draft.

Round	#	Player	Nationality	NHL team	Hometown	OHL team
1	1	Patrick Kane (RW)	United States	Chicago Blackhawks	Buffalo, New York	London Knights
1	6	Sam Gagner (C)	Canada	Edmonton Oilers	Oakville, Ontario	London Knights
1	9	Logan Couture (C)	Canada	San Jose Sharks	London, Ontario	Ottawa 67's
2	32	Brett MacLean (LW)	Canada	Phoenix Coyotes	Port Elgin, Ontario	Oshawa Generals
2	34	Josh Godfrey (D)	Canada	Washington Capitals	Kingston, Ontario	Sault Ste. Marie Greyhounds
2	37	Stefan Legein (RW)	Canada	Columbus Blue Jackets	Oakville, Ontario	Mississauga IceDogs
2	42	Eric Tangradi (LW)	United States	Anaheim Ducks	Philadelphia, Pennsylvania	Belleville Bulls
2	43	P.K. Subban (D)	Canada	Montreal Canadiens	Rexdale, Ontario	Belleville Bulls
2	49	Trevor Cann (G)	Canada	Colorado Avalanche	Oakville, Ontario	Peterborough Petes
2	54	Jeremy Smith (G)	United States	Nashville Predators	Brownstown, Michigan	Plymouth Whalers
2	56	Akim Aliu (RW)	Canada	Chicago Blackhawks	Toronto, Ontario	Sudbury Wolves
2	58	Nick Spaling (C)	Canada	Nashville Predators	Drayton, Ontario	Kitchener Rangers
2	59	Drew Schiestel (D)	Canada	Buffalo Sabres	Hamilton, Ontario	Mississauga IceDogs
2	61	Wayne Simmonds (RW)	Canada	Los Angeles Kings	Pickering, Ontario	Owen Sound Attack
3	62	Mark Katic (D)	Canada	New York Islanders	Porcupine, Ontario	Sarnia Sting
3	73	Yannick Weber (D)	Switzerland	Montreal Canadiens	Bern, Switzerland	Kitchener Rangers
3	74	Dale Mitchell (RW)	Canada	Toronto Maple Leafs	Mississauga, Ontario	Oshawa Generals
3	78	Robert Bortuzzo (D)	Canada	Pittsburgh Penguins	Thunder Bay, Ontario	Kitchener Rangers
3	79	Nick Palmieri (RW)	United States	New Jersey Devils	Clinton, New York	Erie Otters
3	82	Bryan Cameron (RW)	Canada	Los Angeles Kings	Brampton, Ontario	Belleville Bulls
4	111	Luca Caputi (LW)	Canada	Pittsburgh Penguins	Vaughan, Ontario	Mississauga IceDogs
4	117	Matt Halischuk (RW)	Canada	New Jersey Devils	Mississauga, Ontario	Kitchener Rangers
5	132	Chris Terry (C)	Canada	Carolina Hurricanes	Brampton, Ontario	Plymouth Whalers
5	141	Jake Muzzin (D)	Canada	Los Angeles Kings	Woodstock, Ontario	Sault Ste. Marie Greyhounds
5	143	Mickey Renaud (C)	Canada	Calgary Flames	Tecumseh, Ontario	Windsor Spitfires
5	149	Michael Neal (LW)	Canada	Dallas Stars	Whitby, Ontario	Belleville Bulls
6	156	Richard Greenop (RW)	Canada	Chicago Blackhawks	Bowmanville, Ontario	Windsor Spitfires
6	160	Anthony Peluso (D)	Canada	St. Louis Blues	King City, Ontario	Erie Otters
6	162	Brett Bellemore (D)	Canada	Carolina Hurricanes	Windsor, Ontario	Plymouth Whalers
6	171	Dustin Jeffrey (C)	Canada	Pittsburgh Penguins	Courtright, Ontario	Sault Ste. Marie Greyhounds
6	172	Luke Gazdic (LW)	Canada	Dallas Stars	Toronto, Ontario	Erie Otters
6	178	Zack Torquato (C)	Canada	Detroit Red Wings	Sault Ste. Marie, Ontario	Erie Otters
6	180	Justin Taylor (C)	Canada	Washington Capitals	London, Ontario	London Knights
6	181	Corey Syvret (D)	Canada	Florida Panthers	Millgrove, Ontario	Guelph Storm
7	184	Josh Kidd (D)	Canada	Los Angeles Kings	Sundridge, Ontario	Erie Otters

== See also ==
- List of OHA Junior A standings
- List of OHL seasons
- 2007 NHL entry draft
- 2007 Memorial Cup
- 2006–07 QMJHL season
- 2006–07 WHL season
- 2006 in ice hockey
- 2007 in ice hockey

Preceded by 2005–06 OHL season	OHL seasons	Succeeded by 2007–08 OHL season
