= Todd Perry =

Todd Perry may refer to:

- Todd Perry (American football) (born 1970), NFL player
- Todd Perry (ice hockey) (born 1986), Canadian ice hockey player
- Todd Perry (tennis) (born 1976), Australian tennis player
