= Steve Ward (ice hockey) =

Canadian ice hockey player

- Born: February 13, 1986 (age 40) Scarborough, Ontario, Canada
- Height: 5 ft 11 in (180 cm)
- Weight: 185 lb (84 kg; 13 st 3 lb)
- Position: Defence
- Shot: Right
- team Former teams: Retired; AHL; Albany River Rats; San Antonio Rampage; Norfolk Admirals; Portland Pirates; Peoria Rivermen; ECHL; Alaska Aces; Florida Everblades; Reading Royals; Charlotte Checkers
- NHL draft: Undrafted
- Playing career: 2007–2014

Steve Ward (born February 13, 1986) is a former Canadian professional ice hockey defenceman.

== Playing career ==
Following five seasons of major junior hockey in the Ontario Hockey League where he played with 249 games with the Sarnia Sting and Plymouth Whalers, Ward turned professional in 2007, splitting his rookie 2007–08 season between the Florida Everblades of the ECHL and Albany River Rats of the American Hockey League (AHL). Ward played in all seven games played by Albany during the 2008 Calder Cup playoffs, including the longest game in AHL history which occurred on April 24, 2008 during game five of the East Division Semifinals against the Philadelphia Phantoms, which continued 2:58 into the fifth overtime period before Philadelphia scored to end the marathon game.

Ward went on to play seven seasons of professional hockey in North America, including 55 regular-season and playoff games in the AHL, and 372 regular-season and playoff games in the ECHL. From 2010 to 2013, Ward played with the Alaska Aces, helping his team capture the Brabham Cup three times as the ECHL regular-season champion, and also winning the 2011 Kelly Cup in as the ECHL playoff champions.

Following the 2013–14 spent with the Brampton Beast of the Central Hockey League, Ward signed with the Nottingham Panthers to play the 2014–15 season in the Elite Ice Hockey League. However, due to health issues that flared up before his first training camp in the EIHL, he was forced to retire from professional hockey.

== Career statistics ==
| | | | Regular season | | | | | Playoffs |
| Season | Team | League | GP | G | A | Pts | PIM | GP | G | A | Pts | PIM |
|---|---|---|---|---|---|---|---|---|---|---|---|---|
| 2002–03 | North York Rangers | OPJHL | 46 | 1 | 5 | 6 | 38 | — | — | — | — | — |
| 2002–03 | Sarnia Sting | OHL | 6 | 0 | 0 | 0 | 2 | 3 | 1 | 0 | 1 | 0 |
| 2003–04 | Sarnia Sting | OHL | 43 | 3 | 8 | 11 | 26 | 5 | 1 | 0 | 1 | 6 |
| 2004–05 | Plymouth Whalers | OHL | 67 | 5 | 13 | 18 | 56 | 4 | 0 | 1 | 1 | 2 |
| 2005–06 | Plymouth Whalers | OHL | 67 | 14 | 33 | 47 | 90 | 13 | 0 | 6 | 6 | 18 |
| 2006–07 | Plymouth Whalers | OHL | 67 | 15 | 30 | 45 | 84 | 20 | 1 | 12 | 13 | 16 |
| 2007–08 | Florida Everblades | ECHL | 45 | 1 | 13 | 14 | 49 | — | — | — | — | — |
| 2007–08 | Albany River Rats | AHL | 28 | 1 | 7 | 8 | 15 | 7 | 0 | 1 | 1 | 4 |
| 2008–09 | Reading Royals | ECHL | 39 | 6 | 19 | 25 | 19 | — | — | — | — | — |
| 2008–09 | Albany River Rats | AHL | 6 | 0 | 1 | 1 | 0 | — | — | — | — | — |
| 2008–09 | San Antonio Rampage | AHL | 4 | 0 | 0 | 0 | 4 | — | — | — | — | — |
| 2008–09 | Norfolk Admirals | AHL | 1 | 0 | 1 | 1 | 0 | — | — | — | — | — |
| 2008–09 | Portland Pirates | AHL | 8 | 1 | 1 | 2 | 7 | — | — | — | — | — |
| 2008–09 | Charlotte Checkers | ECHL | 6 | 1 | 1 | 2 | 2 | 6 | 0 | 2 | 2 | 6 |
| 2009–10 | Charlotte Checkers | ECHL | 70 | 6 | 21 | 27 | 51 | 11 | 0 | 2 | 2 | 2 |
| 2010–11 | Alaska Aces | ECHL | 69 | 5 | 18 | 23 | 44 | 13 | 1 | 5 | 6 | 4 |
| 2010–11 | Peoria Rivermen | AHL | 1 | 0 | 0 | 0 | 0 | — | — | — | — | — |
| 2011–12 | Alaska Aces | ECHL | 62 | 5 | 20 | 25 | 63 | 10 | 2 | 1 | 3 | 0 |
| 2012–13 | Alaska Aces | ECHL | 37 | 1 | 12 | 13 | 27 | 10 | 1 | 4 | 5 | 6 |
| 2013–14 | Brampton Beast | CHL | 32 | 3 | 9 | 12 | 18 | 5 | 0 | 1 | 1 | 0 |
| ECHL totals | | | 328 | 25 | 104 | 129 | 255 | 44 | 4 | 12 | 16 | 12 |
