= Jiří Tlustý =

Czech ice hockey player (born 1988)

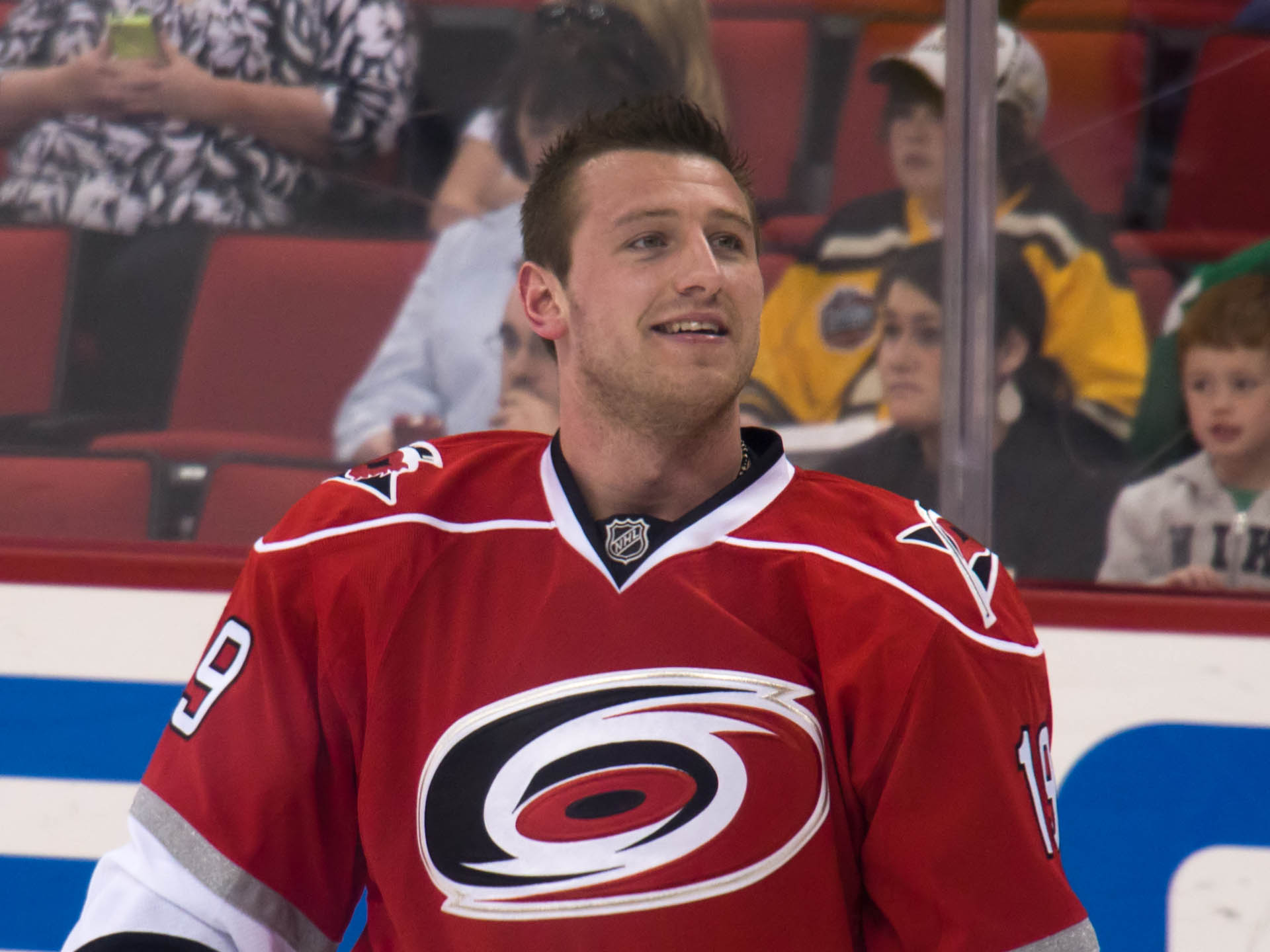
- Tlustý with the Carolina Hurricanes in 2013
- Born: 16 March 1988 (age 38) Slaný, Czechoslovakia
- Height: 6 ft 0 in (183 cm)
- Weight: 205 lb (93 kg; 14 st 9 lb)
- Position: Left wing
- Shot: Left
- Played for: HC Kladno; Toronto Maple Leafs; Carolina Hurricanes; Winnipeg Jets; New Jersey Devils; Oulun Kärpät
- National team: Czech Republic
- NHL draft: 13th overall, 2006; Toronto Maple Leafs
- Playing career: 2005–2017

Jiří Tlustý (born 16 March 1988) is a Czech former professional ice hockey left winger. He was originally a first-round draft pick of the Toronto Maple Leafs in the 2006 NHL entry draft, and split time between the Maple Leafs and the Toronto Marlies of the American Hockey League (AHL) until he was traded to the Carolina Hurricanes in December 2009. Tlustý was also drafted by Atlant Moscow of the Kontinental Hockey League (KHL) on 1 June 2009, 43rd overall.

== Playing career ==
=== Amateur ===
As a youth, Tlustý played in the 2002 Quebec International Pee-Wee Hockey Tournament with a team from Chomutov.

Whilst playing for HC Kladno in his native Czech Republic, Tlustý was drafted in the first round, 13th overall, by the Toronto Maple Leafs at the 2006 NHL entry draft. On 14 July, several weeks after his selection, Tlustý signed a three-year, entry-level contract with the Maple Leafs, wearing jersey number 41 in the team's training camp. On 25 September, he was assigned to the Toronto Marlies, the Maple Leafs' American Hockey League (AHL) affiliate, where he began his professional career by scoring three goals and one assist in six games to begin the 2006–07 season. On 23 October, however, he was assigned to the Sault Ste. Marie Greyhounds to begin his major junior career.

Tlustý was assigned to Sault Ste. Marie of the Ontario Hockey League (OHL) for the 2006–07 season, the holders of his major junior playing rights. In Tlustý's first 13 games of his OHL career, he sustained a high-ankle sprain that kept him out of the lineup for nearly six weeks as he attended treatment in Toronto. The injury also kept him from joining the Czech junior team at the 2007 World Junior Championships after initially being named to the pre-tournament roster.

Tlustý made his return to the Greyhounds lineup in mid-January 2007, finishing his first season in the OHL with 13 goals, 21 assists for 34 points in 37 games. With Tlustý back in the lineup, the Greyhounds made a strong finish leading into the playoffs and scored an upset in the first round, eliminating the Saginaw Spirit in six games. In the next round, the team faced the London Knights, ultimately losing in seven games. In the playoffs, Tlustý excelled, scoring nine goals and eight assists for 17 points in just 13 games.

=== Professional ===
Ahead of the 2007–08 season, Tlustý attended the Maple Leafs' prospect camp tournament, where he played in all four tournament games, scoring three goals and adding one assist for four points. After the prospects' camp, Tlustý then attended the Maple Leafs' training camp and participated in the pre-season action. He played five games in the pre-season, recording one assist and eventually making the final cuts before ultimately being assigned to the AHL again. He played in five games in the AHL, scoring one goal and two assists, before being called up to the NHL for the first time. On 25 October, he made his NHL debut in a game against the Pittsburgh Penguins, scoring two goals. His first came off a shot from Alexander Steen that deflected off of Tlustý's backside and into the net. Thirty-five seconds later, he scored with a wrist shot from the wing. He later recorded his first career NHL assist in a game on 2 November. After originally wearing jersey number 41 in the NHL, he later switched to number 11.

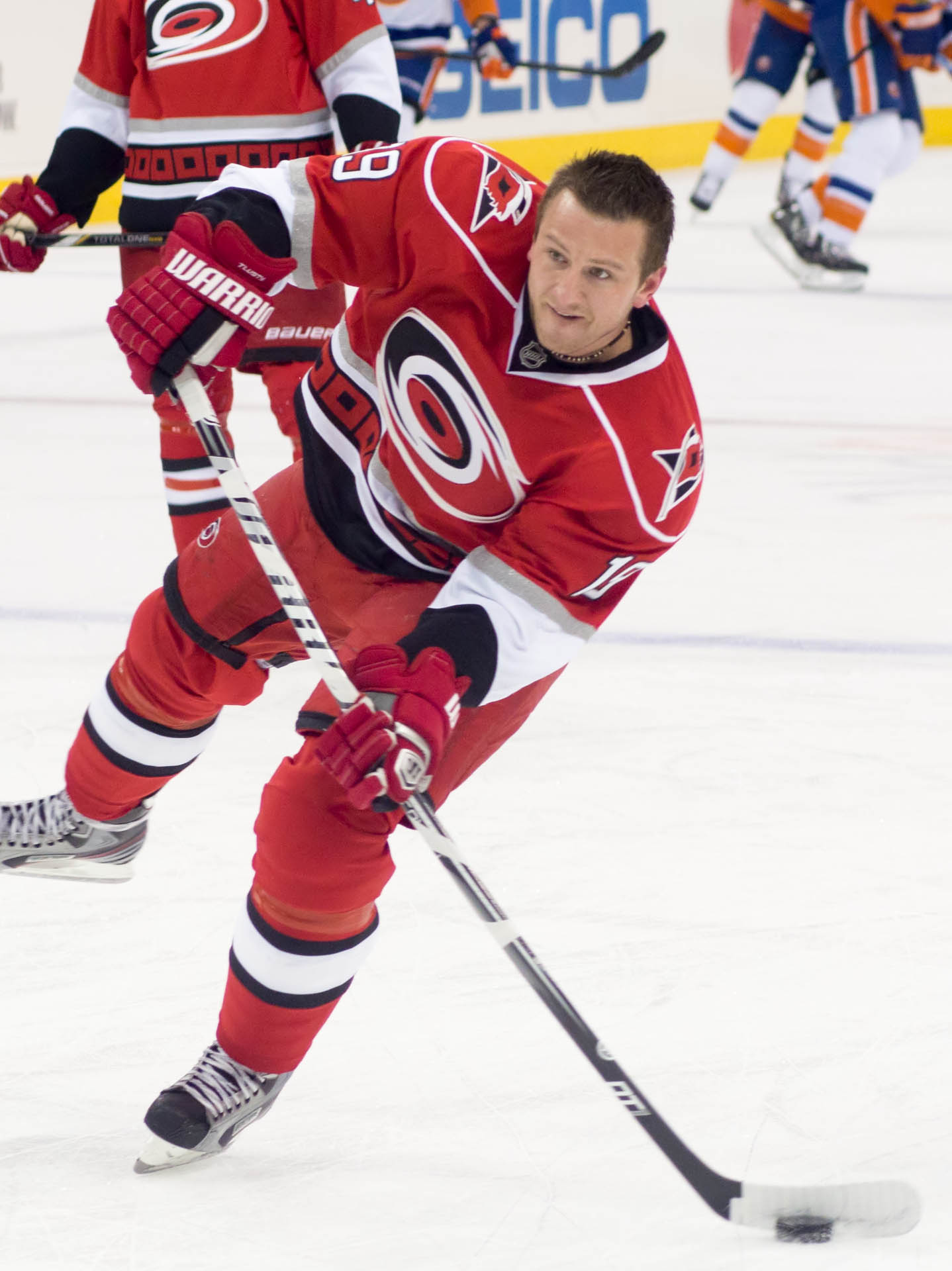
Tlustý during his tenure with the Hurricanes

On 15 January 2009, Tlustý registered an NHL career-high of three points, all assists, in a game against the Carolina Hurricanes. The next month, on 18 February, after being reassigned to the Marlies, Tlustý scored five goals on just five shots in a game against the Syracuse Crunch, setting a franchise record for most goals scored in one game by a Marlies player, and the first player to score five goals in an AHL game since Jarkko Immonen did so in 2006. On 4 March, still with the Marlies, Tlustý set another franchise record, this time for most points in a game against the Providence Bruins; he finished with two goals and four assists for six points in a 6–4 Marlies victory.

On 3 December 2009, during the 2009–10 season, Tlustý was traded to the Carolina Hurricanes in exchange for forward Philippe Paradis. Tlustý scored his first goal for the Hurricanes on 11 December 2009, against the Washington Capitals in his first game for the club. On 1 July 2010, he signed a one-year, one-way contract with Carolina worth US$500,000. On 1 July 2011, Tlustý again signed a one-year, one-way contract with Carolina, this time worth US$525,000.

Tlustý set career-highs of 18 goals and 36 points during the 2011–12 season and was subsequently re-signed by the Hurricanes to a two-year, $3.2 million contract extension.

Tlustý again set a new career-high in goals (23) and points (38) during the lockout-shortened 2012–13 season. Tlustý, playing alongside NHL All-Stars Eric Staal and Alexander Semin, discovered a new-found scoring touch that led him to finish tied for fifth in goal-scoring in the NHL.

On 25 February 2015, during the 2014–15 season and with Tlustý in the final year of his contract and with the Hurricanes out of Stanley Cup playoff contention, he was traded to the Winnipeg Jets in exchange for a third-round draft pick in 2016 and a conditional sixth-round draft pick in 2015.

On 16 September 2015, Tlustý signed a one-year, one-way contract with the New Jersey Devils. In the 2015–16 season with the Devils, Tlustý was hampered with injury and a lack of productivity in a depth role, recording lows of 2 goals and 4 points in 30 games.

As an un-signed free agent over the following summer, on 20 September 2016, Tlustý agreed to a professional try-out contract to participate in the training camp of the Colorado Avalanche. He was subsequently released from his try-out with the Avalanche after failing to pass the initial medical and physical test. On 31 October 2016, Tlustý signed a try-out contract with Finnish-based, Oulun Kärpät of the Liiga. He appeared in 14 games in Kärpät before he was released following his trial period due to lingering injury on 12 December 2016.

== Personal ==
In mid-November 2007, photos of Tlustý, one of which was of him nude, appeared on the Internet, causing a media frenzy. Tlustý took the photos with his cell phone while still playing for Sault Ste. Marie the previous season. The photos of Tlustý first appeared on Canadian gossip site isthishappening.com, after which Tlustý retained the Toronto law firm Adair Morse, which began threatening some websites that had put the photos up with legal action. He issued a press release saying, "I used poor judgment in this instance and I have learned a valuable lesson." A second set of photos, reportedly taken during a night at a bar, was also circulating on the Internet. One photo showed Tlustý with his tongue out towards a male friend who was leaning in over his shoulder. This photo was published as the full-front-page photo of the 14 November 2007, issue of the Toronto Sun.

== Career statistics ==
=== Regular season and playoffs ===
			Regular season					Playoffs
Season	Team	League	GP	G	A	Pts	PIM	GP	G	A	Pts	PIM
2003–04	HC Rabat Kladno	CZE U20	51	10	3	13	12	1	0	0	0	0
2004–05	HC Rabat Kladno	CZE U20	42	15	12	27	54	10	2	2	4	8
2005–06	HC Rabat Kladno	CZE U20	6	4	2	6	2	6	7	6	13	6
2005–06	HC Rabat Kladno	ELH	44	7	3	10	51	—	—	—	—	—
2006–07	Sault Ste. Marie Greyhounds	OHL	37	13	21	34	28	13	9	8	17	14
2006–07	Toronto Marlies	AHL	6	3	1	4	4	—	—	—	—	—
2007–08	Toronto Marlies	AHL	14	7	11	18	8	19	2	8	10	8
2007–08	Toronto Maple Leafs	NHL	58	10	6	16	14	—	—	—	—	—
2008–09	Toronto Maple Leafs	NHL	14	0	4	4	0	—	—	—	—	—
2008–09	Toronto Marlies	AHL	66	25	41	66	26	6	1	2	3	2
2009–10	Toronto Maple Leafs	NHL	2	0	0	0	0	—	—	—	—	—
2009–10	Toronto Marlies	AHL	19	8	7	15	4	—	—	—	—	—
2009–10	Carolina Hurricanes	NHL	18	1	5	6	6	—	—	—	—	—
2009–10	Albany River Rats	AHL	20	6	9	15	10	5	0	1	1	0
2010–11	Charlotte Checkers	AHL	5	1	1	2	4	—	—	—	—	—
2010–11	Carolina Hurricanes	NHL	57	6	6	12	14	—	—	—	—	—
2011–12	Carolina Hurricanes	NHL	79	17	19	36	26	—	—	—	—	—
2012–13	Rytíři Kladno	ELH	24	12	11	23	12	—	—	—	—	—
2012–13	Carolina Hurricanes	NHL	48	23	15	38	18	—	—	—	—	—
2013–14	Carolina Hurricanes	NHL	68	16	14	30	22	—	—	—	—	—
2014–15	Carolina Hurricanes	NHL	52	13	10	23	16	—	—	—	—	—
2014–15	Winnipeg Jets	NHL	20	1	7	8	4	4	0	0	0	0
2015–16	New Jersey Devils	NHL	30	2	2	4	6	—	—	—	—	—
2016–17	Kärpät	Liiga	14	1	4	5	4	—	—	—	—	—
AHL totals			130	50	70	120	56	30	3	11	14	10
NHL totals			446	89	88	177	126	4	0	0	0	0

=== International ===
Year	Team	Event	Result	GP	G	A	Pts	PIM
2004	Czech Republic	U18	2nd place, silver medalist(s)	5	0
2005	Czech Republic	U17	7th	5	5	4	9	4
2005	Czech Republic	WJC18	4th	7	3	0	3	2
2005	Czech Republic	U18	2nd place, silver medalist(s)	4	0	0	0	2
2006	Czech Republic	WJC18	3rd place, bronze medalist(s)	7	4	3	7	8
2006	Czech Republic	WJC	6th	4	0	0	0	0
2013	Czech Republic	WC	7th	8	1	3	4	8
Junior totals				27	12	7	19	16
Senior totals				8	1	3	4	8

Awards and achievements
Preceded by Tuukka Rask	Toronto Maple Leafs first-round draft pick 2006	Succeeded by Luke Schenn
