= Jared Boll =

American ice hockey player (born 1986)

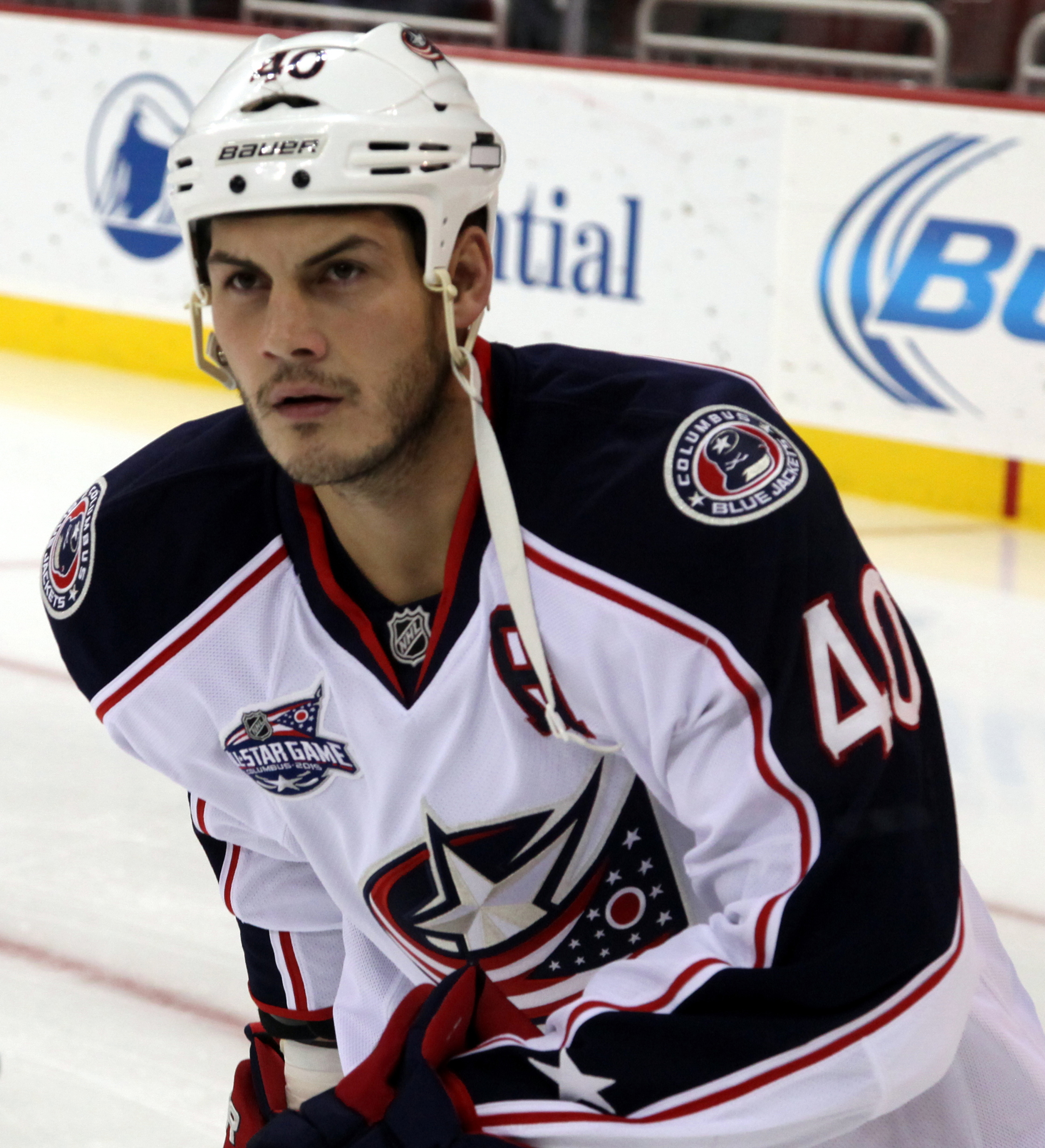
- Boll in 2014
- Born: May 13, 1986 (age 40) Charlotte, North Carolina, U.S.
- Height: 6 ft 2 in (188 cm)
- Weight: 209 lb (95 kg; 14 st 13 lb)
- Position: Right wing
- Shot: Right
- Played for: Columbus Blue Jackets; Anaheim Ducks
- NHL draft: 101st overall, 2005; Columbus Blue Jackets
- Playing career: 2007–2018

Jared Rittenhouse Boll (born May 13, 1986) is an American former professional ice hockey player. He played in the National Hockey League (NHL) for nine seasons with the Columbus Blue Jackets organization before closing out his career after two seasons with the Anaheim Ducks. During his playing career, he was known primarily for his role as an enforcer.

== Playing career ==
Boll was born in Charlotte, North Carolina, but grew up in Crystal Lake, Illinois. He attended Prairie Ridge High School and left after sophomore year.

Boll was originally drafted by the Kingston Frontenacs of the Ontario Hockey League (OHL), but chose to attempt playing in the American college system by playing for the Lincoln Stars in the United States Hockey League (USHL). While there, he was named captain of the Stars. After a very successful second year with Lincoln, he was offered a deal to play in the NCAA at the University of Minnesota Duluth. However, declined the offer in favour of playing in the OHL, his playing rights having been acquired by the Plymouth Whalers in a trade for their sixth round OHL Priority Selection draft pick in 2006. Boll was named an alternate captain of the Whalers and was a fan favorite, spending two seasons with the Whalers and helping the team win the 2007 OHL Championship over the Sudbury Wolves on his 21st birthday.

Boll was signed by the Columbus Blue Jackets and made the roster for the 2007–08 season, scoring his first NHL goal on October 10, 2007, on a breakaway against the Phoenix Coyotes.

Appearing in 75 games for Columbus during the 2008–09 season, Boll posted four goals and ten assists.

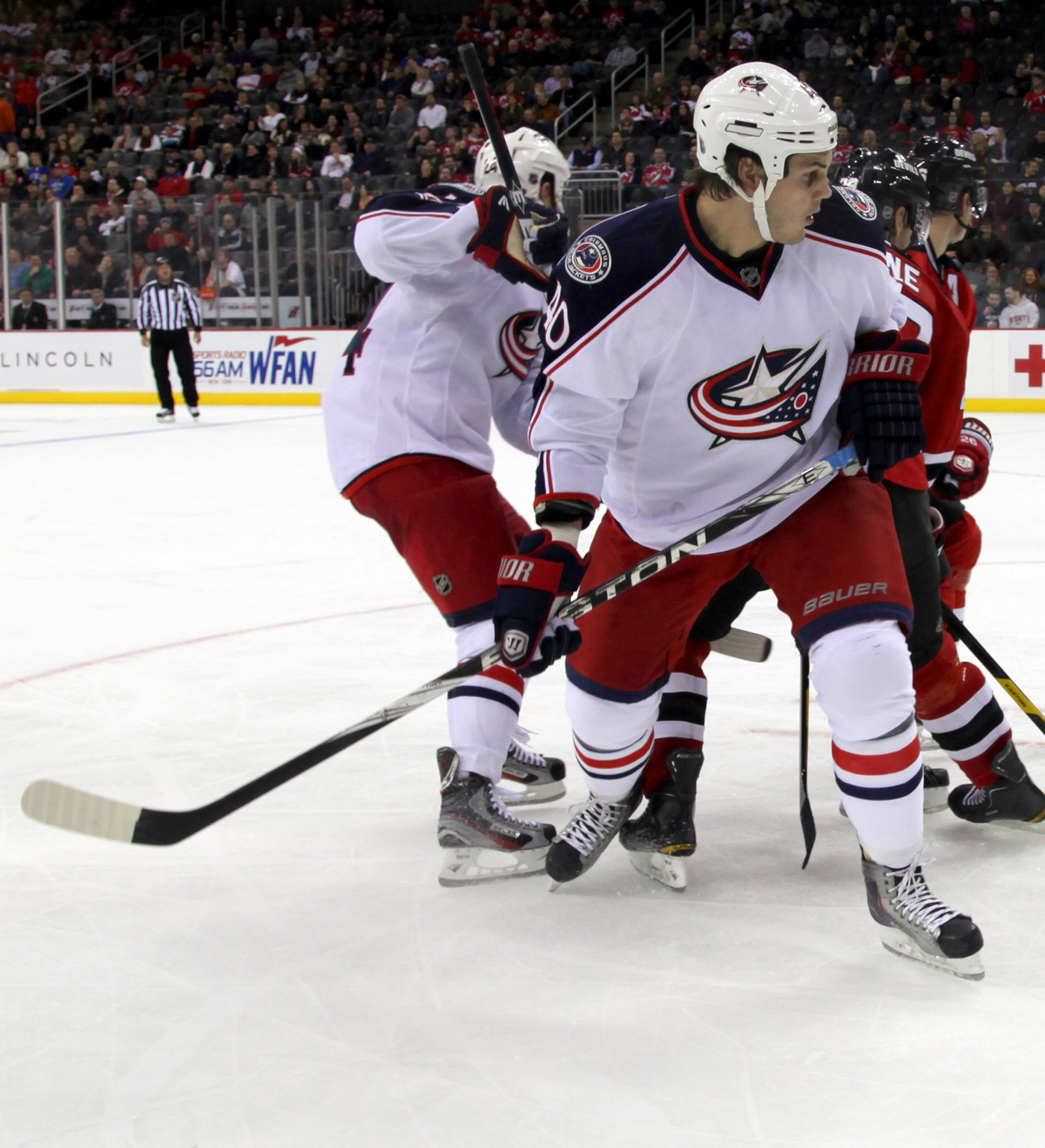
Boll in 2011

On March 26, 2015, the NHL's Department of Player Safety suspended Boll for three games, without pay, for an illegal check to the head of Anaheim Ducks forward Patrick Maroon during a game two days earlier. On March 24, 2016, Boll was again suspended by the Department of Player Safety, this time for four games, for a hit it described as "both excessively late and incredibly forceful" against Philadelphia Flyers' forward Pierre-Édouard Bellemare. Boll, a repeat offender under the terms of the NHL's Collective Bargaining Agreement, forfeited $82,926.84 in salary as a result.

Boll's 11-year tenure in the Blue Jackets organization came to an end on June 30, 2016, when the team, which was up against the salary cap, placed him on unconditional waivers for the purpose of buying out the final year of his contract. On July 5, 2016, Boll agreed to a two-year contract as a free agent with the Anaheim Ducks. On December 10, 2017, Boll was placed on waivers by the Ducks, after which he was demoted to their American Hockey League (AHL) affiliate, the San Diego Gulls, on December 11. At the conclusion of his contract with the Ducks, and with the change in the professional ranks in moving away from pure enforcers, Boll opted to end his professional playing career after 11 NHL seasons.

== Post-playing career ==
On September 17, 2018, Boll joined the Columbus Blue Jackets organization as an assistant development coach.

== Career statistics ==
			Regular season					Playoffs
Season	Team	League	GP	G	A	Pts	PIM	GP	G	A	Pts	PIM
2003–04	Lincoln Stars	USHL	57	6	8	14	176	—	—	—	—	—
2004–05	Lincoln Stars	USHL	59	23	24	47	294	4	1	3	4	25
2005–06	Plymouth Whalers	OHL	65	19	22	41	205	13	2	4	6	21
2006–07	Plymouth Whalers	OHL	66	28	27	55	198	9	1	2	3	34
2007–08	Columbus Blue Jackets	NHL	75	5	5	10	226	—	—	—	—	—
2008–09	Columbus Blue Jackets	NHL	75	4	10	14	180	1	0	0	0	0
2009–10	Columbus Blue Jackets	NHL	68	4	3	7	149	—	—	—	—	—
2010–11	Columbus Blue Jackets	NHL	73	7	5	12	182	—	—	—	—	—
2011–12	Columbus Blue Jackets	NHL	54	2	1	3	126	—	—	—	—	—
2012–13	TUTO Hockey	Mestis	5	2	1	3	31	—	—	—	—	—
2012–13	Columbus Blue Jackets	NHL	43	2	4	6	100	—	—	—	—	—
2013–14	Columbus Blue Jackets	NHL	28	1	1	2	62	2	0	0	0	0
2014–15	Columbus Blue Jackets	NHL	72	1	4	5	109	—	—	—	—	—
2015–16	Columbus Blue Jackets	NHL	30	1	2	3	61	—	—	—	—	—
2016–17	Anaheim Ducks	NHL	51	0	3	3	87	8	0	0	0	5
2017–18	Anaheim Ducks	NHL	10	1	0	1	16	—	—	—	—	—
2017–18	San Diego Gulls	AHL	15	1	2	3	19	—	—	—	—	—
NHL totals			579	28	38	66	1298	11	0	0	0	5
