= David Kuchejda =

Czech ice hockey player

- Born: July 12, 1987 (age 38) Opava, Czechoslovakia
- Height: 5 ft 11 in (180 cm)
- Weight: 189 lb (86 kg; 13 st 7 lb)
- Position: Right wing
- Shoots: Left
- Oberliga team Former teams: Deggendorfer SC; HC České Budějovice; Rytíři Kladno
- NHL draft: 202nd overall, 2005; Chicago Blackhawks
- Playing career: 2005–present

David Kuchejda (born July 12, 1987) is a Czech professional ice hockey right wing who plays for Deggendorfer SC of the Oberliga. He was drafted by the Chicago Blackhawks in the 7th round of the 2005 NHL entry draft.

Kuchejda played 210 games in the Czech Extraliga for HC České Budějovice and Rytíři Kladno.

== Career statistics ==
=== Regular season and playoffs ===
			Regular season					Playoffs
Season	Team	League	GP	G	A	Pts	PIM	GP	G	A	Pts	PIM
2000–01	HC Havířov Panthers	CZE U18	19	3	3	6	4	—	—	—	—	—
2001–02	HC Havířov Panthers	CZE U18	15	4	4	8	8	—	—	—	—	—
2001–02	HC České Budějovice	CZE U18	29	8	15	23	51	—	—	—	—	—
2002–03	HC České Budějovice	CZE U18	45	23	29	52	34	6	3	4	7	6
2003–04	HC České Budějovice	CZE U18	3	2	1	3	31	2	1	0	1	16
2003–04	HC České Budějovice	CZE U20	47	7	12	19	40	—	—	—	—	—
2004–05	HC České Budějovice	CZE U20	42	12	28	40	142	2	1	1	2	2
2004–05	HC České Budějovice	CZE.2	1	0	0	0	0	—	—	—	—	—
2005–06	Sault Ste. Marie Greyhounds	OHL	67	19	21	40	80	4	0	1	1	8
2006–07	Sault Ste. Marie Greyhounds	OHL	59	25	28	53	77	13	4	3	7	22
2007–08	HC Mountfield	ELH	12	0	0	0	2	1	0	0	0	0
2007–08	BK Mladá Boleslav	CZE.2	18	1	3	4	72	—	—	—	—	—
2008–09	HC Mountfield	ELH	30	0	2	2	10	—	—	—	—	—
2008–09	HC Slovan Ústečtí Lvi	CZE.2	5	1	0	1	8	—	—	—	—	—
2009–10	HC Mountfield	ELH	8	0	0	0	0	—	—	—	—	—
2009–10	HC Tábor	CZE.2	38	6	5	11	38	5	0	1	1	38
2010–11	HC Mountfield	ELH	49	6	7	13	22	6	0	1	1	2
2010–11	HC Tábor	CZE.2	3	0	0	0	4	—	—	—	—	—
2011–12	HC Mountfield	ELH	45	6	7	13	51	5	0	0	0	18
2012–13	Rytíři Kladno	ELH	44	2	4	6	34	10	0	0	0	2
2012–13	IHC KOMTERM Písek	CZE.2	2	0	0	0	4	—	—	—	—	—
2013–14	ČEZ Motor České Budějovice	CZE.2	51	8	14	22	28	—	—	—	—	—
2014–15	ČEZ Motor České Budějovice	CZE.2	46	9	20	29	34	11	1	7	8	10
2015–16	ČEZ Motor České Budějovice	CZE.2	51	15	16	31	20	5	2	1	3	2
2016–17	ČEZ Motor České Budějovice	CZE.2	29	3	8	11	20	—	—	—	—	—
2016–17	EHC Bayreuth	GER.2	9	2	3	5	0	4	2	1	3	12
2017–18	EC Kassel Huskies	GER.2	29	5	10	15	12	—	—	—	—	—
2017–18	Lausitzer Füchse	GER.2	9	2	4	6	4	—	—	—	—	—
2018–19	Lausitzer Füchse	GER.2	49	5	17	22	22	7	2	0	2	2
2019–20	Eispiraten Crimmitschau	GER.2	36	6	6	12	10	—	—	—	—	—
2020–21	Deggendorfer SC	GER.3	35	5	16	21	40	—	—	—	—	—
2021–22	HC Samson České Budějovice	CZE.4	10	8	10	18	10	7	2	8	10	8
CZE.2 totals			244	43	66	109	228	21	3	9	12	50
ELH totals			188	14	20	34	119	22	0	1	1	22

=== International ===
Year	Team	Event	GP	G	A	Pts	PIM
2004	Czech Republic	U18	5
2005	Czech Republic	WJC18	7	3	2	5	6
2007	Czech Republic	WJC	5	0	0	0	4
Junior totals			12	3	2	5	10
