= David Meckler =

American ice hockey player

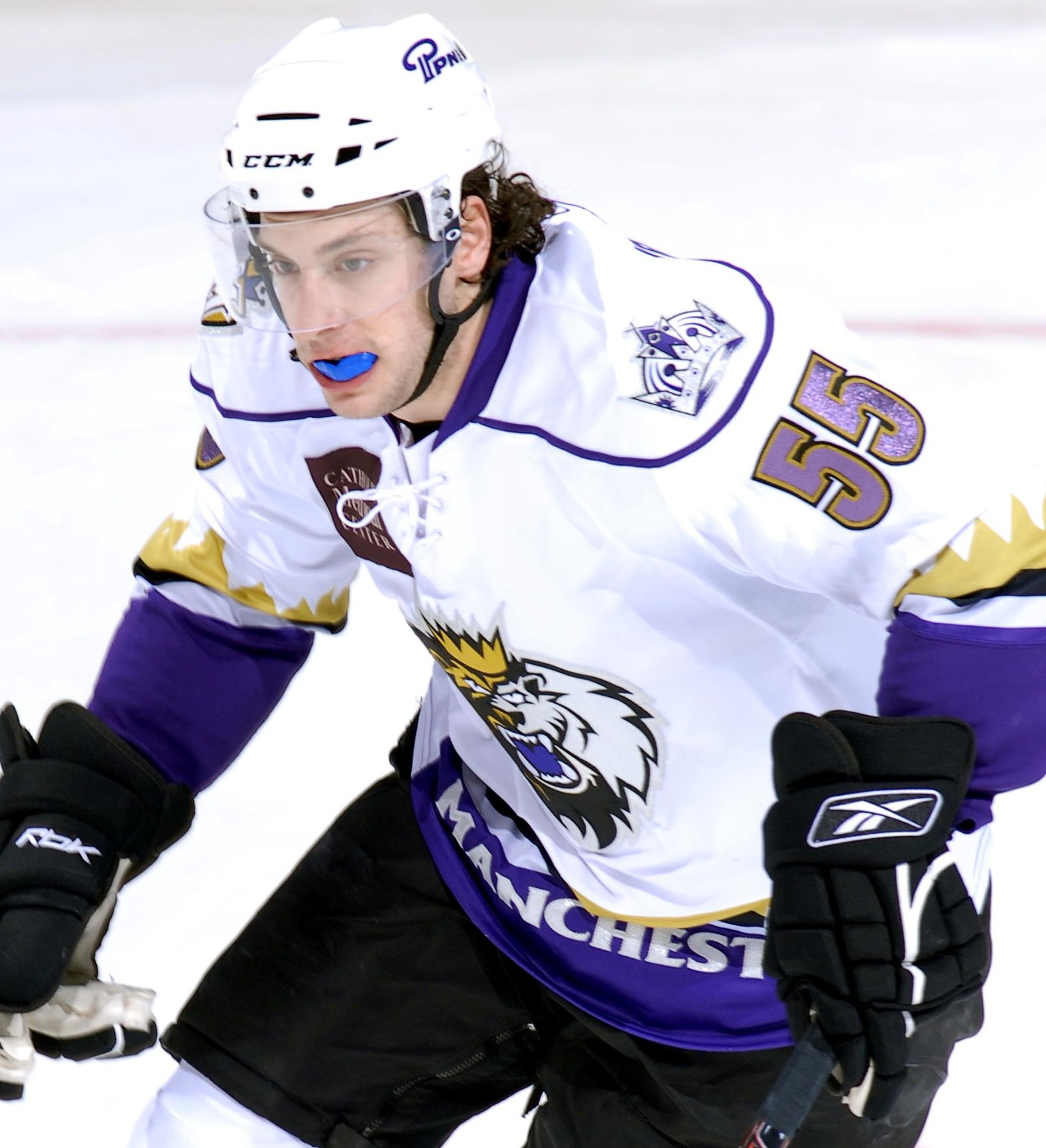
- Meckler with the Manchester Monarchs in 2008
- Born: July 9, 1987 (age 39) Highland Park, Illinois, U.S.
- Height: 6 ft 0 in (183 cm)
- Weight: 214 lb (97 kg; 15 st 4 lb)
- Position: Left wing
- Shot: Right
- Played for: Manchester Monarchs; EC Red Bull Salzburg; EHC München
- NHL draft: 134th overall, 2006; Los Angeles Kings
- Playing career: 2007–2015

David Meckler (born July 9, 1987) is an American former professional ice hockey player. He last played for EHC Red Bull München in the Deutsche Eishockey Liga (DEL). He was selected by the Los Angeles Kings in the 5th round (134th overall) of the 2006 NHL entry draft.

== Early life ==
Meckler, who is Jewish, was born in Highland Park, Illinois. He attended Waterloo High School and Yale University.

== Playing career ==
On March 5, 2006, Meckler scored the winning goal to end the 2nd longest game in NCAA hockey history. Yale University defeated Union College, 3–2, in the ECAC Hockey League first-round playoff game after 81:35 of overtime. David Meckler scored the winning goal with Yale shorthanded.

Upon completion of his junior career with the London Knights of the Ontario Hockey League, Meckler signed a three-year entry-level contract with the Los Angeles Kings to begin in the 2007–08 season. He was assigned to and became a fixture of American Hockey League affiliate, the Manchester Monarchs. After three years with the Monarchs, Meckler was re-signed by the Kings to a one-year contract on July 16, 2011.

After six seasons within the Kings organization with the Manchester Monarchs, featuring in 414 AHL contests yet unable to make his NHL debut, Meckler left as a free agent to forge a European career and signed a contract with Austrian club, EC Red Bull Salzburg on September 3, 2013.

After one year in the EC Red Bull Salzburg Organization, Meckler left Salzburg to sign a contract with sponsor affiliate, EHC Red Bull München of the Deutsche Eishockey Liga on November 17, 2014.

Meckler initially signed a one-year contract extension to remain in Munich, however on May 29, 2015, advised the club he would terminate the contract due to an enforced time-out from professional hockey due to a spinal injury.

== Career statistics ==
			Regular season					Playoffs
Season	Team	League	GP	G	A	Pts	PIM	GP	G	A	Pts	PIM
2002–03	Chicago Freeze	NAHL	56	7	15	22	48	—	—	—	—	—
2003–04	Waterloo Black Hawks	USHL	56	9	8	17	43	11	3	1	4	17
2004–05	Waterloo Black Hawks	USHL	60	30	15	45	32	5	3	2	5	2
2005–06	Yale University	ECAC	31	7	3	10	28	—	—	—	—	—
2006–07	London Knights	OHL	67	38	35	73	53	16	15	7	22	20
2007–08	Manchester Monarchs	AHL	76	23	13	36	24	4	1	1	2	2
2008–09	Manchester Monarchs	AHL	74	14	15	29	28	—	—	—	—	—
2009–10	Manchester Monarchs	AHL	73	11	9	20	22	14	1	0	1	2
2010–11	Manchester Monarchs	AHL	75	16	17	33	28	7	2	0	2	0
2011–12	Manchester Monarchs	AHL	44	10	7	17	13	4	0	0	0	0
2012–13	Manchester Monarchs	AHL	39	3	6	9	8	4	1	1	2	4
2013–14	EC Red Bull Salzburg	AUT	44	14	23	37	16	14	6	8	14	2
2014–15	EC Red Bull Salzburg	AUT	14	2	3	5	2	—	—	—	—	—
2014–15	EHC Red Bull München	DEL	30	13	11	24	4	4	0	1	1	0
AHL totals			381	77	67	144	123	33	5	2	7	8

== See also ==
- List of select Jewish ice hockey players
