= Evan Brophey =

Canadian ice hockey player (born 1986)

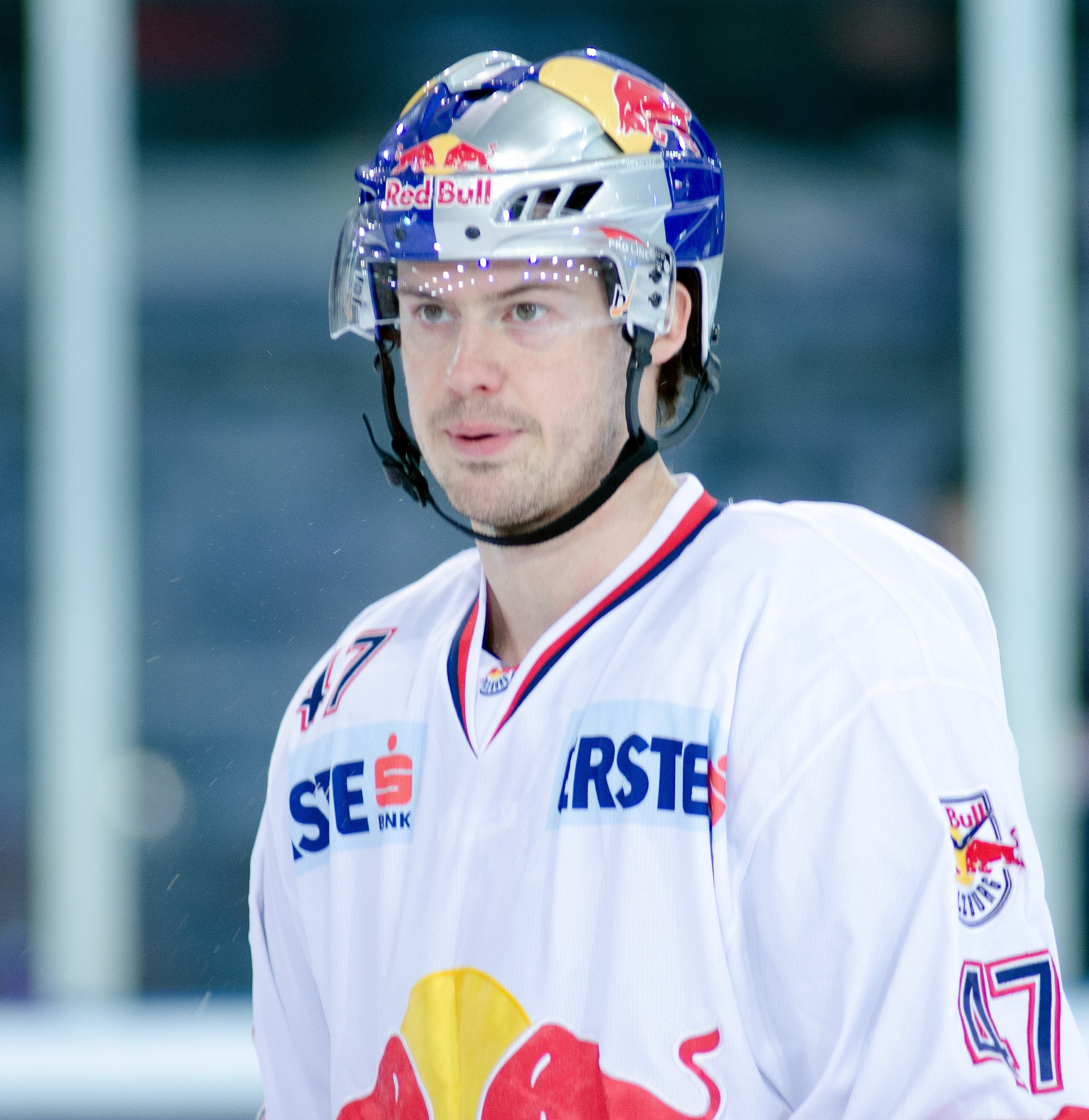
- Born: December 3, 1986 (age 39) Kitchener, Ontario, Canada
- Height: 6 ft 1 in (185 cm)
- Weight: 205 lb (93 kg; 14 st 9 lb)
- Position: Centre
- Shot: Left
- Played for: Chicago Blackhawks; Colorado Avalanche; EC Red Bull Salzburg; EHC München; Graz 99ers HC Košice; HSC Csíkszereda
- NHL draft: 68th overall, 2005; Chicago Blackhawks
- Playing career: 2007–2020

Evan Brophey (born December 3, 1986) is a Canadian former professional ice hockey centre. He played with the Chicago Blackhawks and the Colorado Avalanche of the National Hockey League (NHL).

== Playing career ==
Brophey was drafted 68th overall in the 2005 NHL entry draft by the Chicago Blackhawks. Prior to being drafted Brophey played in the Ontario Hockey League, drafted by the Barrie Colts in 37th overall in the priority selection of 2002. Evan also played for the Belleville Bulls and the Plymouth Whalers. He was also remembered for scoring the overtime game-winning goal against Saginaw to clinch the West Division title in 2005–06.

On May 15, 2007, Brophey signed a three-year entry-level contract with the Blackhawks. In his first professional campaign, in the 2007–08 season, Brophey finished with four goals and 15 assists in 74 games with Blackhawks AHL affiliate, the Rockford IceHogs. He scored his first professional goal and had three points on October 13 against the Iowa Stars in just his second pro contest.

On October 23, 2010 Brophey played in his first NHL game. He achieved one shot on goal during 10 shifts in the 3-2 home loss against the Columbus Blue Jackets.

On July 8, 2011, Brophey signed a one-year contract as a free agent with the Colorado Avalanche. Assigned to AHL affiliate, the Lake Erie Monsters, to begin the 2011–12 season, Brophey was later recalled to make his Avalanche debut and second career game in a 5-4 defeat to the San Jose Sharks on December 16, 2011. After three games with the Avalanche, Brophey was returned to the Monsters and instantly responded to record a Monsters club record with four assists in a 6-5 victory over the Grand Rapids Griffins on December 28. In the remainder of the season with the Monsters, Brophey scored a career high 18 goals and matched his career best 39 points.

With the NHL lockout affecting his status as a free agent, Brophey joined the Portland Pirates of the AHL on a professional try-out just prior to the start of the 2012–13 season on October 15, 2012. Brophey remained with the Pirates for the duration of the season and as an alternate captain, tallied 23 points in 61 games.

On July 30, 2013, Brophey was signed as a free agent to his first European contract on a one-year deal with EC Red Bull Salzburg of the Austrian Hockey League. He enjoyed a successful 2013–14 season with Salzburg, helping claim the crown of Austrian Champions before falling to HC Bolzano in the EBEL final.

Brophey then joined EHC München on a one-year contract on June 5, 2014, following head coach Don Jackson from fellow Red Bull sponsored Austrian team, the EC Red Bull Salzburg of the Austrian Hockey League (EBEL).

For the 2015–16 season, Brophey returned to the EBEL in signing a one-year contract with the Graz 99ers.

After three seasons with the 99ers, Brophy left the EBEL as a free agent to sign a one-year contract with Slovak club HC Košice of the Slovak Extraliga on May 17, 2018.

== Career statistics ==
			Regular season					Playoffs
Season	Team	League	GP	G	A	Pts	PIM	GP	G	A	Pts	PIM
2001–02	Waterloo Siskins	MWJHL	48	11	18	29	4	6	0	0	0	0
2002–03	Barrie Colts	OHL	61	12	14	26	36	6	0	0	0	2
2003–04	Barrie Colts	OHL	67	14	11	25	63	12	4	3	7	4
2004–05	Barrie Colts	OHL	10	3	7	10	13	—	—	—	—	—
2004–05	Belleville Bulls	OHL	53	25	36	61	42	5	2	1	3	2
2005–06	Belleville Bulls	OHL	22	9	17	26	39	—	—	—	—	—
2005–06	Plymouth Whalers	OHL	40	10	25	35	42	13	4	7	11	18
2006–07	Plymouth Whalers	OHL	68	36	71	107	91	20	9	14	23	26
2007–08	Rockford IceHogs	AHL	74	4	15	19	64	1	0	0	0	0
2008–09	Rockford IceHogs	AHL	79	16	23	39	65	4	1	0	1	0
2009–10	Rockford IceHogs	AHL	79	14	17	31	39	4	0	0	0	2
2010–11	Rockford IceHogs	AHL	67	10	9	19	65	—	—	—	—	—
2010–11	Chicago Blackhawks	NHL	1	0	0	0	0	—	—	—	—	—
2011–12	Lake Erie Monsters	AHL	72	18	21	39	58	—	—	—	—	—
2011–12	Colorado Avalanche	NHL	3	0	0	0	0	—	—	—	—	—
2012–13	Portland Pirates	AHL	61	8	15	23	41	3	0	0	0	4
2013–14	EC Red Bull Salzburg	AUT	43	12	12	24	26	14	1	4	5	18
2014–15	EHC Red Bull München	DEL	28	5	13	18	32	—	—	—	—	—
2015–16	Graz 99ers	AUT	49	11	16	27	40	—	—	—	—	—
2016–17	Graz 99ers	AUT	54	13	28	41	44	5	2	0	2	2
2017–18	Graz 99ers	AUT	54	11	26	37	26	—	—	—	—	—
2018–19	HC Košice	SVK	56	15	24	39	46	6	1	0	1	6
2019–20	HSC Csíkszereda	Erste	48	15	25	40	22	—	—	—	—	—
2019–20	HSC Csíkszereda	ROU	27	23	22	45	24	—	—	—	—	—
AHL totals			432	70	100	170	332	12	1	0	1	6
NHL totals			4	0	0	0	0	—	—	—	—	—
AUT totals			200	47	82	129	136	19	3	4	7	20
