= Gerome Giudice =

Canadian ice hockey player

- Born: March 11, 1989 (age 36) Acton, Ontario, Canada
- Height: 5 ft 11 in (180 cm)
- Weight: 201 lb (91 kg; 14 st 5 lb)
- Position: Left wing
- Shoots: Left
- EIHL team Former teams: Coventry Blaze; Muskegon Lumberjacks; HC Fassa; Tulsa Oilers
- Playing career: 2009–present

Gerome Giudice (born March 11, 1989) is a Canadian former professional ice hockey left winger who last played for the Coventry Blaze in the Elite Ice Hockey League in the United Kingdom.

== Career statistics ==
			Regular season					Playoffs
Season	Team	League	GP	G	A	Pts	PIM	GP	G	A	Pts	PIM
2005–06	Sudbury Northern Wolves	NOJHL	25	7	7	14	80	2	0	0	0	8
2005–06	Sudbury Wolves	OHL	39	0	1	1	52	10	2	1	3	28
2006–07	Sudbury Wolves	OHL	59	2	6	8	124	11	3	3	6	12
2007–08	Sudbury Wolves	OHL	64	15	29	44	141	—	—	—	—	—
2008–09	Sudbury Wolves	OHL	55	10	17	27	109	6	1	1	2	10
2008–09	Muskegon Lumberjacks	IHL	6	2	2	4	9	11	0	1	1	8
2009–10	HC Fassa	Italy	35	9	11	20	72	6	4	2	6	10
2010–11	HC Fassa	Italy	29	7	10	17	83	3	0	0	0	10
2011–12	Tulsa Oilers	CHL	28	3	14	17	73	—	—	—	—	—
2012–13	Coventry Blaze	EIHL	20	5	7	12	36	—	—	—	—	—
2012–13	SG Pontebba	Italy	9	2	6	8	82	—	—	—	—	—
2013–14	Coventry Blaze	EIHL	23	2	4	6	49	2	1	0	1	6
Italy totals			73	18	27	45	237	9	4	2	6	20
