= Brett Bellemore =

Canadian ice hockey player (born 1988)

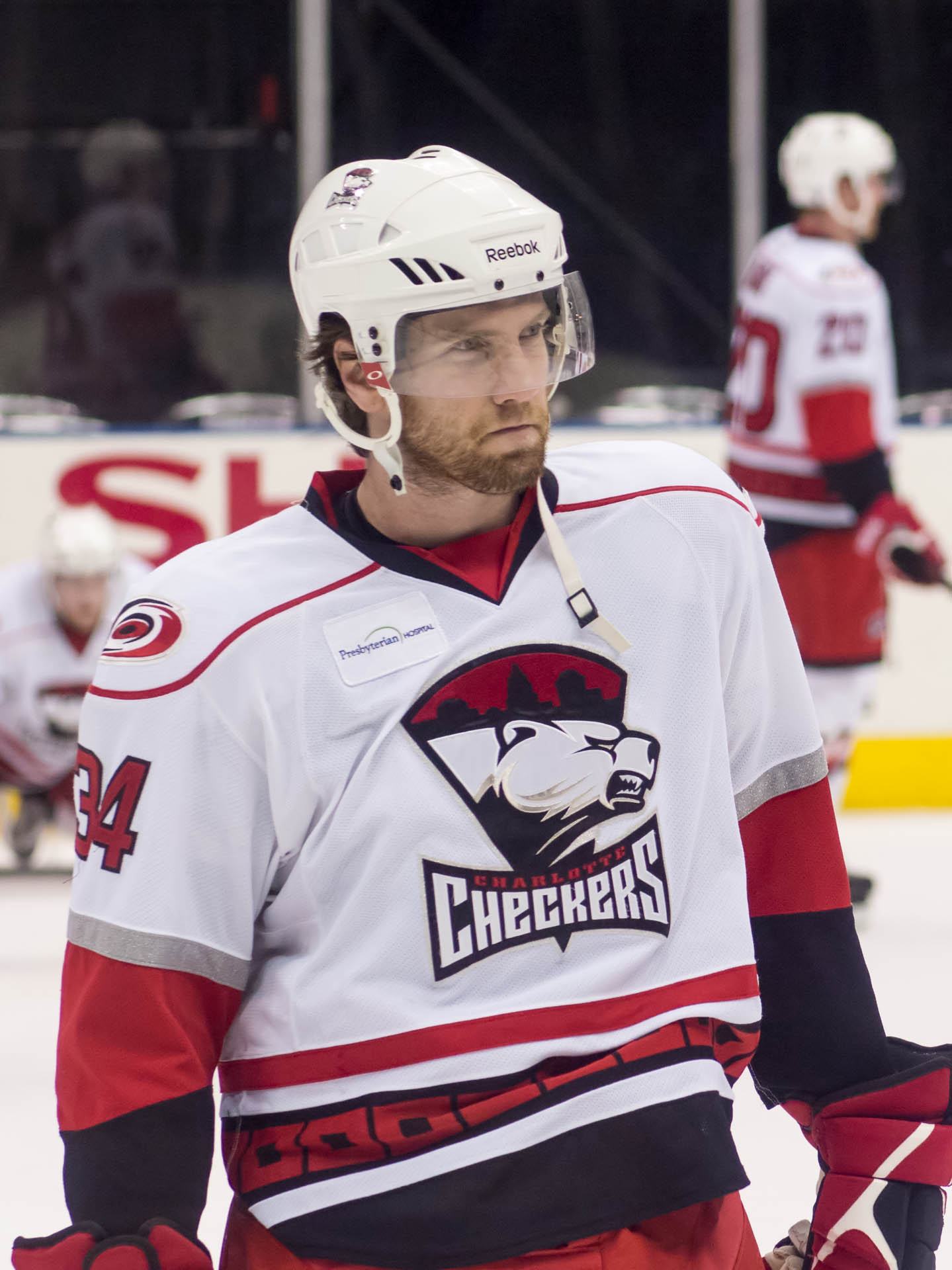
- Bellemore with the Charlotte Checkers in 2013
- Born: June 25, 1988 (age 38) Windsor, Ontario, Canada
- Height: 6 ft 4 in (193 cm)
- Weight: 210 lb (95 kg; 15 st 0 lb)
- Position: Defence
- Shot: Right
- Played for: Carolina Hurricanes; Kunlun Red Star; Esbjerg Energy
- NHL draft: 162nd overall, 2007; Carolina Hurricanes
- Playing career: 2008–2019

Brett Bellemore (born June 25, 1988) is a Canadian former professional ice hockey defenceman who most recently played with Esbjerg Energy in the Metal Ligaen (DEN). He previously played in the National Hockey League (NHL) for the Carolina Hurricanes. Bellemore was selected in the 6th round, 162nd overall, by the Hurricanes in the 2007 NHL entry draft.

== Playing career ==
Bellemore played major junior with the Plymouth Whalers in the Ontario Hockey League before he was signed to a three-year entry-level contract with the Hurricanes on May 15, 2008.

On July 8, 2011, Bellemore signed a two-year, two-way contract with the Carolina Hurricanes. The contract was worth $525,000 per year at the NHL level and $70,000 per year at the AHL level.

On June 28, 2013, Bellemore signed a one-year, two-way contract to remain with the Hurricanes.

After 6 seasons within the Hurricanes organization, Bellemore became a free agent. Unable to secure a contract, Bellemore began training with the New York Rangers after receiving a try-out to training camp on September 9, 2015. After his release from the Rangers pre-season roster, Bellemore agreed to a one-year AHL contract with the Providence Bruins, affiliate to the Boston Bruins on October 9, 2015.

For a second consecutive season, Bellemore faced free agency in the off-season. On July 24, 2016, Bellemore opted to continue his career in the Kontinental Hockey League, signing a one-year deal with Chinese entrant, HC Kunlun Red Star.

== Career statistics ==
			Regular season					Playoffs
Season	Team	League	GP	G	A	Pts	PIM	GP	G	A	Pts	PIM
2005–06	Plymouth Whalers	OHL	46	0	0	0	16	10	0	0	0	0
2006–07	Tecumseh Chiefs	WOHL	4	0	3	3	10	—	—	—	—	—
2006–07	Plymouth Whalers	OHL	50	0	12	12	50	20	0	5	5	28
2007–08	Plymouth Whalers	OHL	56	6	18	24	70	4	0	2	2	8
2007–08	Albany River Rats	AHL	4	0	0	0	6	5	0	0	0	6
2008–09	Plymouth Whalers	OHL	29	2	10	12	39	11	1	2	3	16
2008–09	Albany River Rats	AHL	6	0	0	0	4	—	—	—	—	—
2009–10	Albany River Rats	AHL	75	1	6	7	81	8	0	1	1	2
2010–11	Charlotte Checkers	AHL	71	2	8	10	74	16	1	1	2	12
2011–12	Charlotte Checkers	AHL	76	1	9	10	60	—	—	—	—	—
2012–13	Charlotte Checkers	AHL	68	2	11	13	87	5	0	1	1	6
2012–13	Carolina Hurricanes	NHL	8	0	2	2	7	—	—	—	—	—
2013–14	Carolina Hurricanes	NHL	64	2	6	8	45	—	—	—	—	—
2014–15	Carolina Hurricanes	NHL	49	2	8	10	27	—	—	—	—	—
2015–16	Providence Bruins	AHL	56	1	5	6	41	3	0	0	0	0
2016–17	Kunlun Red Star	KHL	59	4	11	15	29	5	0	1	1	4
2017–18	Kunlun Red Star	KHL	11	0	0	0	14	—	—	—	—	—
2017–18	KRS Heilongjiang	VHL	3	1	0	1	0	—	—	—	—	—
2018–19	Esbjerg Energy	DEN	17	1	4	5	18	7	0	1	1	8
AHL totals			356	7	39	46	353	37	1	3	4	26
NHL totals			121	4	16	20	79	—	—	—	—	—
