= Justin Donati =

- Born: October 17, 1986 (age 39) Oakville, Ontario, Canada
- Height: 5 ft 10 in (178 cm)
- Weight: 180 lb (82 kg; 12 st 12 lb)
- Position: Center
- Shot: Right
- ACH team Former teams: Stoney Creek Generals; Vita Hästen; Portland Pirates; Binghamton Senators; Vålerenga; HC TWK Innsbruck
- NHL draft: Undrafted
- Playing career: 2007–2019

Justin Donati (born October 17, 1986) is a Canadian former professional ice hockey forward, who last played professionally for the Brampton Beast of the ECHL. Justin played with his identical twin brother Tyler Donati on the Toronto St. Michael's Majors of the OHL, but this was ended when Tyler was traded to the Belleville Bulls. Justin is the younger of the Donati twins by 7 minutes. Neither brother was drafted to the NHL in 2006, but both attended Detroit Red Wings rookie camp. In 2007, Justin was invited to participate in the Calgary Flames rookie camp as a non-draft invitee.

== Playing career ==
On January 8, 2005 Justin, along with his brother Tyler, was acquired from the Oshawa Generals to the Toronto St. Michael's Majors for Cal Clutterbuck. In February 2007 Justin was acquired from the Toronto St. Michael's Majors to the Sudbury Wolves.

Justin and his brother both attended the Detroit Red Wings rookie camp as non-draft invitees in August/Sept of 2006 and played well, both producing points regularly throughout the tournament games. Justin signed with the UPEI Panthers of the Atlantic University Sport conference in December 2007. A shoulder injury kept him out until early February, but he posted 10 points in his four games with the club.

On May 31, 2013, Donati left Norway and joined his brother in signing a one-year contract with Austrian club, HC TWK Innsbruck of the EBEL.

On July 10, 2014 a free agent after a single season with Innsbruck, Donati signed a one-year contract in Sweden with Vita Hästen of the HockeyAllsvenskan.

== Personal information ==
Justin and his brother Tyler are actively involved in the "points for Cancer" fund, with money for each point either Donati scores being matched by their respective hockey clubs going to research to finding a cure for ovarian cancer, which their mother Corinne was diagnosed with in 2003. She died in July 2006 but the "points for Cancer" fundraising continues in her name.

== Career statistics ==
			Regular season					Playoffs
Season	Team	League	GP	G	A	Pts	PIM	GP	G	A	Pts	PIM
2002–03	Burlington Cougars	OPJHL	33	15	14	29	11	—	—	—	—	—
2003–04	Oshawa Generals	OHL	45	15	15	30	16	7	1	2	3	2
2004–05	Oshawa Generals	OHL	14	6	9	15	10	—	—	—	—	—
2004–05	Toronto St. Michael's Majors	OHL	29	6	18	24	20	10	4	3	7	4
2005–06	Toronto St. Michael's Majors	OHL	62	46	63	109	50	4	5	3	8	4
2006–07	Toronto St. Michael's Majors	OHL	35	26	30	56	24	—	—	—	—	—
2006–07	Sudbury Wolves	OHL	28	21	14	35	6	19	14	14	28	6
2007–08	U. of Prince Edward Island	AUS	4	4	6	10	0	—	—	—	—	—
2007–08	Las Vegas Wranglers	ECHL	14	0	11	11	8	—	—	—	—	—
2008–09	U. of Prince Edward Island	AUS	27	18	30	48	30	—	—	—	—	—
2009–10	HC Thurgau	NLB	3	0	0	0	2	—	—	—	—	—
2009–10	Elmira Jackals	ECHL	65	42	62	104	48	5	2	7	9	4
2009–10	Portland Pirates	AHL	1	0	1	1	0	—	—	—	—	—
2009–10	Binghamton Senators	AHL	3	0	0	0	0	—	—	—	—	—
2010–11	Elmira Jackals	ECHL	63	27	67	94	83	4	2	3	5	2
2011–12	Vålerenga Ishockey	GET	21	14	37	51	16	—	—	—	—	—
2012–13	Vålerenga Ishockey	GET	44	37	32	69	40	15	11	9	20	28
2013–14	HC TWK Innsbruck	EBEL	54	23	29	52	26	—	—	—	—	—
2014–15	HC Vita Hästen	Allsv	17	7	5	12	10	—	—	—	—	—
2014–15	Brampton Beast	ECHL	49	15	28	43	38	—	—	—	—	—
2015–16	Stoney Creek Generals	ACH	15	8	14	22	14	7	0	6	6	0
2016–17	Stoney Creek Generals	ACH	18	10	20	30	6	9	3	11	14	24
2017–18	Stoney Creek Generals	ACH	18	15	11	26	6	4	1	4	5	0
2018–19	Stoney Creek Generals	ACH	7	7	7	14	4	7	3	6	9	4
2019–20	Brantford Blast	ACH	1	0	0	0	0	—	—	—	—	—
ECHL totals			191	84	168	252	177	9	4	10	14	6
AHL totals			4	0	1	1	0	—	—	—	—	—

== Awards ==
- 2005–06 OHL All-Star
- 2009–10 CCM Rookie of the Year
