= Tyler Donati =

Canadian ice hockey player

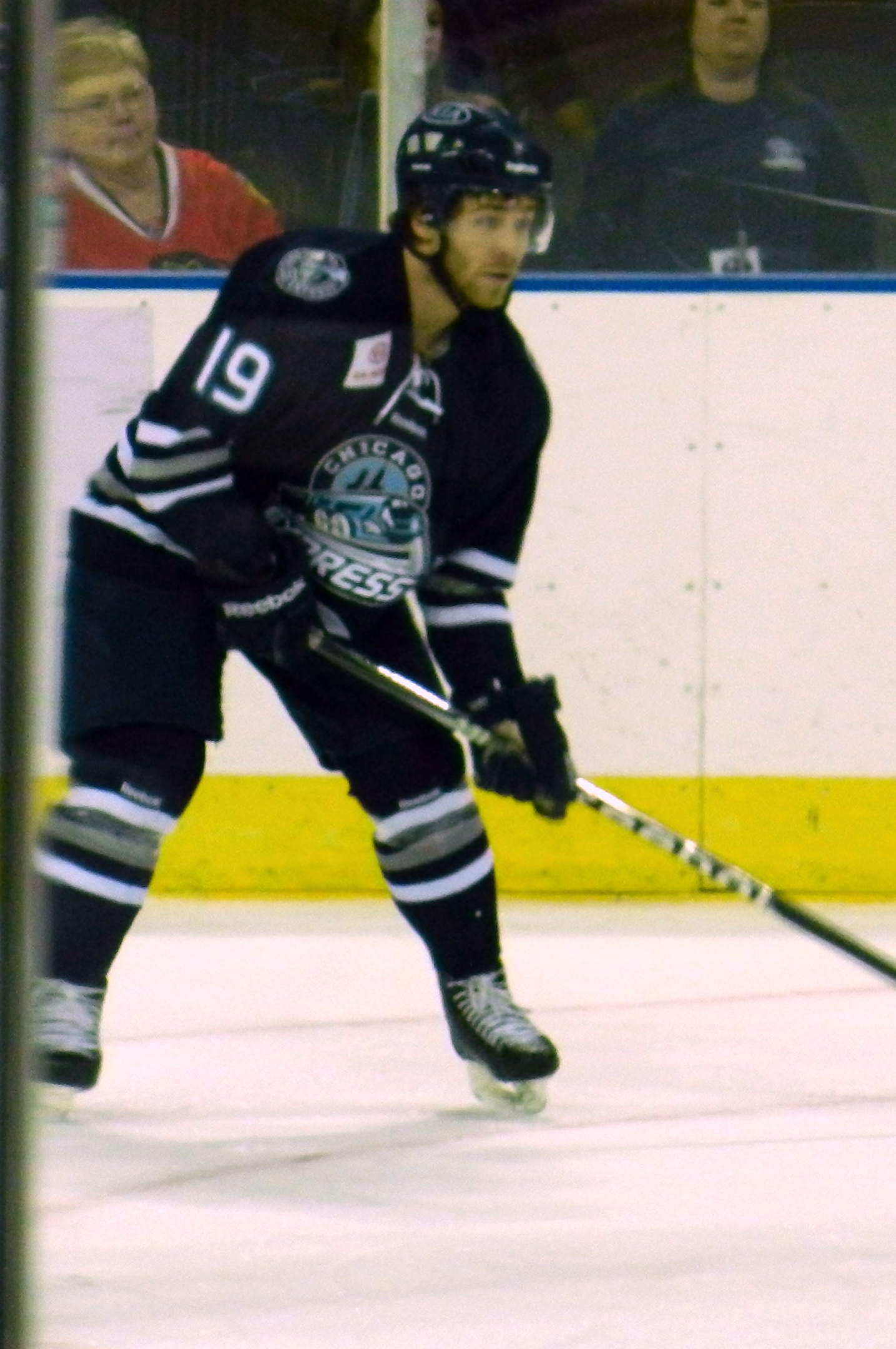
- Born: October 17, 1986 (age 39) Oakville, Ontario, Canada
- Height: 5 ft 10 in (178 cm)
- Weight: 182 lb (83 kg; 13 st 0 lb)
- Position: Right wing
- Shoots: Left
- ACH team Former teams: Stoney Creek Generals Brampton Beast; Binghamton Senators; Philadelphia Phantoms; Hartford Wolf Pack; Connecticut Whale; Vålerenga; HC TWK Innsbruck
- NHL draft: Undrafted
- Playing career: 2006–present

Tyler Donati (born October 17, 1986) is a Canadian professional ice hockey right wing, who last played for the Brampton Beast of the ECHL. Tyler is the identical twin of hockey player Justin Donati, and is older than Justin by just 7 minutes. Though neither brother has been drafted, both attended the Detroit Red Wings rookie camp in 2006.

== Playing career ==
On January 8, 2005, Tyler, along with brother Justin, was acquired from the Oshawa Generals to the Toronto St. Michael's Majors for Cal Clutterbuck. Tyler played alongside of Justin on the Toronto St. Michael's Majors of the OHL, but this was ended when Tyler was traded to the Belleville Bulls. Tyler and his brother both attended the Detroit Red Wings rookie camp as non-draft invitees in August/September 2006 and played well, both producing points regularly throughout the tournament games. His 2010–11 season with the Elmira Jackals was cut short after being side-lined due to shoulder surgery.

On May 23, 2012, Donati left for Europe to join Vålerenga Ishockey of the GET-ligaen in Oslo, Norway. After two seasons abroad, Donati returned to his home province of Ontario, in signing a one-year deal with the Brampton Beast of the ECHL on September 15, 2014.

== Personal life ==
Tyler and his brother Justin were actively involved in the Points for Cancer fund, with money for each point either Donati scores being matched by their respective hockey clubs and going towards research to find a cure for ovarian cancer. They joined this organization because their mother Corinne was diagnosed with ovarian cancer in 2003. Following their mother's death in July 2006, the brothers continue Points for Cancer fundraising in her name.

== Career statistics ==
			Regular season					Playoffs
Season	Team	League	GP	G	A	Pts	PIM	GP	G	A	Pts	PIM
2002–03	Burlington Cougars	OPJHL	46	19	15	34	4	—	—	—	—	—
2003–04	Oshawa Generals	OHL	65	20	36	56	25	7	1	2	3	2
2004–05	Oshawa Generals	OHL	25	12	14	26	18	—	—	—	—	—
2004–05	Toronto St. Michael's Majors	OHL	28	9	8	17	12	10	2	5	7	0
2005–06	Toronto St. Michael's Majors	OHL	68	36	36	72	50	4	1	2	3	2
2005–06	Motor City Mechanics	UHL	4	0	1	1	4	—	—	—	—	—
2006–07	Belleville Bulls	OHL	66	54	75	129	52	15	6	20	26	4
2007–08	Binghamton Senators	AHL	53	6	12	18	26	—	—	—	—	—
2007–08	Elmira Jackals	ECHL	5	0	3	3	0	—	—	—	—	—
2008–09	Elmira Jackals	ECHL	15	6	14	20	2	—	—	—	—	—
2008–09	Philadelphia Phantoms	AHL	4	0	1	1	0	—	—	—	—	—
2009–10	HC Thurgau	NLB	3	0	0	0	0	—	—	—	—	—
2009–10	Elmira Jackals	ECHL	67	38	76	114	52	5	2	5	7	0
2010–11	Hartford Wolf Pack/CT Whale	AHL	9	0	0	0	0	—	—	—	—	—
2010–11	Elmira Jackals	ECHL	18	10	11	21	34	—	—	—	—	—
2011–12	Chicago Express	ECHL	46	14	47	61	29	—	—	—	—	—
2012–13	Vålerenga Ishockey	GET	39	18	42	60	18	15	10	13	23	28
2013–14	HC TWK Innsbruck	EBEL	53	18	33	51	10	—	—	—	—	—
2014–15	Brampton Beast	ECHL	25	9	14	23	46	—	—	—	—	—
2015–16	Stoney Creek Generals	ACH	17	9	15	24	16	8	2	5	7	0
2016–17	Stoney Creek Generals	ACH	17	12	16	28	0	9	0	7	7	10
2017–18	Stoney Creek Generals	ACH	14	6	17	23	2	6	4	5	9	12
2018–19	Stoney Creek Generals	ACH	14	7	13	20	0	—	—	—	—	—
2019–20	Brantford Blast	ACH	3	1	2	3	0	1	0	0	0	0
ECHL totals			176	77	165	242	163	5	2	5	7	0
AHL totals			66	6	13	19	26	—	—	—	—	—

== Awards ==
- 2009–10 CCM U+ ECHL Most Valuable Player
- 2009–10 Leading Scorer
