= Rob Drummond =

Canadian ice hockey player (born 1986)

- Born: February 19, 1986 (age 40) London, Ontario, Canada
- Height: 5 ft 11 in (180 cm)
- Weight: 175 lb (79 kg; 12 st 7 lb)
- Position: Center
- Shot: Right
- Played for: Lake Erie Monsters
- NHL draft: Undrafted
- Playing career: 2007–2009

Robert "Rob" Drummond (born February 19, 1986, in London, Ontario) is a former Canadian professional ice hockey player. He played with the Lake Erie Monsters of the AHL.

== Playing career ==
Rob Drummond played junior hockey for the London Knights of the OHL under the coaching of former Washington Capitals Captain Dale Hunter. He helped London win the J. Ross Robertson Cup and the Memorial Cup in 2005. He served as Captain of the London Knights for the duration of the 2006 and 2007 seasons.

Although he went Undrafted, Drummond was signed to a contract with the Colorado Avalanche in 2007. He played with the Johnstown Chiefs of the ECHL in 2007–08 season, totaling 14 goals and 27 assists in 50 games. He added 30 PIM. Later in the 2007–08 season he moved up to the Lake Erie Monsters of the AHL playing 22 games with 2 goals, 3 assists and 8 penalty minutes.

In the 2008-09 season Drummond signed an AHL contract with the Monsters. After playing in 11 games with Lake Erie, Drummond suffered a concussion which ruled him out for the rest of the season.

== Career statistics ==
			Regular season					Playoffs
Season	Team	League	GP	G	A	Pts	PIM	GP	G	A	Pts	PIM
2002–03	London Knights	OHL	14	2	2	4	4	2	0	0	0	0
2003–04	London Knights	OHL	42	2	6	8	14	15	0	1	1	8
2004–05	London Knights	OHL	65	8	18	26	30	18	0	1	1	8
2005–06	London Knights	OHL	54	14	13	27	43	19	8	4	12	16
2006–07	London Knights	OHL	56	21	45	66	48	12	3	2	5	7
2007–08	Johnstown Chiefs	ECHL	50	14	27	41	30	—	—	—	—	—
2007–08	Lake Erie Monsters	AHL	22	2	3	5	8	—	—	—	—	—
2008–09	Lake Erie Monsters	AHL	11	2	1	3	8	—	—	—	—	—
AHL totals			33	4	4	8	16	—	—	—	—	—

== Awards and honours ==
Award	Year
CHL
Memorial Cup (London Knights)	2005
