= Jonathan D'Aversa =

Canadian ice hockey player

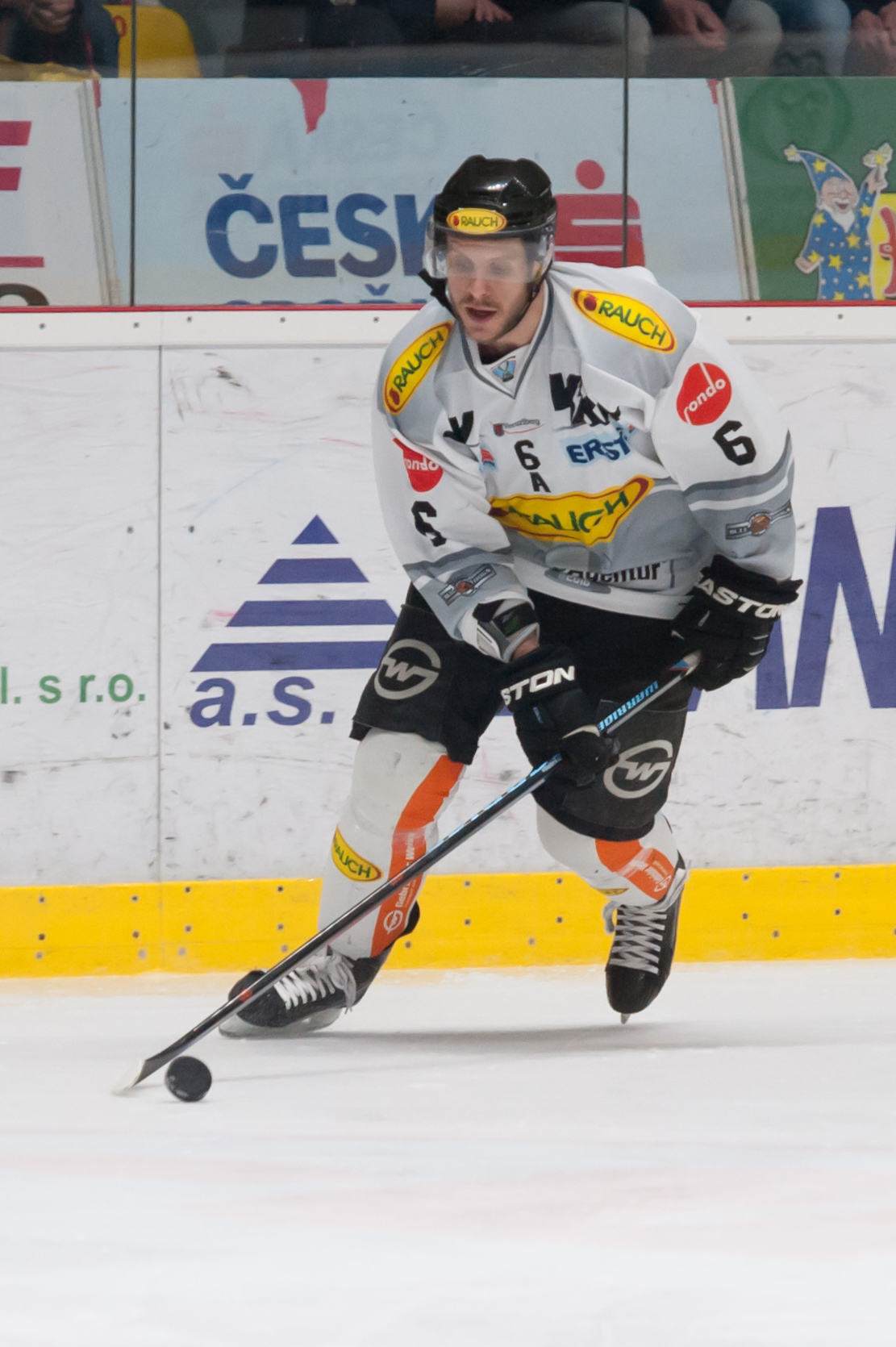
- Born: March 2, 1986 (age 40) Richmond Hill, Ontario, Canada
- Height: 6 ft 2 in (188 cm)
- Weight: 200 lb (91 kg; 14 st 4 lb)
- Position: Defence
- Shot: Left
- Played for: Wilkes-Barre/Scranton Penguins; Augsburger Panther; Kölner Haie; Dornbirner EC; EHC Black Wings Linz
- NHL draft: Undrafted
- Playing career: 2007–2019

Jonathan D'Aversa (born March 2, 1986) is a Canadian former professional ice hockey defenceman who played in the American Hockey League (AHL) with Wilkes-Barre/Scranton Penguins before spending the majority of his professional career in Europe.

== Playing career ==
D'Aversa was an undrafted player who played for the Sudbury Wolves of the OHL. Serving as an assistant captain for the Wolves in the 2006–07 season, D'Aversa was third on the team in scoring and was selected to play in the OHL All-Star classic. In the play-offs he was ranked second in scoring for defensemen. After completing his junior years, D'Aversa was signed as a free agent to a three-year contract by the Pittsburgh Penguins on May 25, 2007.

In the 2007–08 season, D'Aversa spent time with the Penguins American Hockey League affiliate the Wilkes-Barre/Scranton Penguins and the Wheeling Nailers of the ECHL, representing the Nailers in the ECHL All-Star Game.

On July 11, 2010, D'Aversa left North America and signed a one-year contract with Augsburger Panther of the German Deutsche Eishockey Liga for the 2010–11 season. Despite scoring 33 points in 51 games, Augsburg missed the playoffs and on April 1, 2011, D'Aversa left to sign with fellow DEL club Kölner Haie.

After one season in Köln, d'Aversa transferred as a free agent to the neighbouring Austrian Hockey League with Dornbirner EC on August 4, 2012. He remained with the club until the end of the 2015–16 season. In April 2016, he penned a deal with another Austrian team, EHC Linz.

Following his third season with the Black Wings in 2018–19, D'Aversa opted to end his 12-year professional career and return to North America.

== Career statistics ==
			Regular season					Playoffs
Season	Team	League	GP	G	A	Pts	PIM	GP	G	A	Pts	PIM
2001–02	Stouffville Spirit	OPJHL	2	0	1	1	0	—	—	—	—	—
2002–03	Stouffville Spirit	OPJHL	49	4	21	25	18	—	—	—	—	—
2003–04	Sudbury Wolves	OHL	63	1	14	15	22	7	0	1	1	2
2004–05	Sudbury Wolves	OHL	67	5	24	29	42	12	4	6	10	8
2005–06	Sudbury Wolves	OHL	62	7	39	46	83	10	2	0	2	17
2006–07	Sudbury Wolves	OHL	67	13	47	60	53	21	3	15	18	16
2007–08	Wilkes-Barre/Scranton Penguins	AHL	27	4	2	6	6	—	—	—	—	—
2007–08	Wheeling Nailers	ECHL	25	1	13	14	10	—	—	—	—	—
2008–09	Wilkes-Barre/Scranton Penguins	AHL	68	1	22	23	36	11	0	2	2	4
2008–09	Wheeling Nailers	ECHL	3	1	3	4	2	—	—	—	—	—
2009–10	Wilkes-Barre/Scranton Penguins	AHL	21	0	1	1	23	—	—	—	—	—
2009–10	Wheeling Nailers	ECHL	22	6	11	17	26	—	—	—	—	—
2010–11	Augsburger Panther	DEL	51	15	18	33	26	—	—	—	—	—
2011–12	Kölner Haie	DEL	45	3	14	17	26	6	0	2	2	6
2012–13	Dornbirner EC	EBEL	51	5	24	29	52	—	—	—	—	—
2013–14	Dornbirner EC	EBEL	50	13	28	41	32	6	0	3	3	4
2014–15	Dornbirner EC	EBEL	52	7	27	34	39	—	—	—	—	—
2015–16	Dornbirner EC	EBEL	49	7	14	21	59	6	2	3	5	0
2016–17	EHC Black Wings Linz	EBEL	53	2	19	21	24	5	0	4	4	4
2017–18	EHC Black Wings Linz	EBEL	41	10	27	37	24	12	3	7	10	2
2018–19	EHC Black Wings Linz	EBEL	41	5	16	21	20	—	—	—	—	—
AHL totals			116	5	25	30	65	11	0	2	2	4
