= Milan Dóczy =

Czech ice hockey player

- Born: January 27, 1990 (age 35); Zlín, Czechoslovakia
- Height: 6 ft 5 in (196 cm)
- Weight: 235 lb (107 kg; 16 st 11 lb)
- Position: Defence
- Shot: Left
- OUA team: Brock Badgers
- Played for: HC Oceláři Třinec (Czech)
- National team: Czech Republic
- Playing career: 2010–2015

Milan Dóczy (born January 27, 1990) is a Czech university ice hockey defenceman who currently plays for the Brock Badgers of Ontario University Athletics (OUA). He played with HC Oceláři Třinec in the Czech Extraliga during the 2010–11 Czech Extraliga season.
