= Marek Indra =

Czech ice hockey forward

- Born: April 11, 1989 (age 36) Prague, Czechoslovakia
- Height: 6 ft 0 in (183 cm)
- Weight: 183 lb (83 kg; 13 st 1 lb)
- Position: Right wing
- Shoots: Left
- Czech 2. liga team Former teams: HC Kobra Praha; BK Mladá Boleslav; Naprzód Janów
- Playing career: 2008–present

Marek Indra (born April 11, 1989) is a Czech professional ice hockey right winger currently playing for HC Kobra Praha of the Czech 2. liga.

Indra previously played two games in the Czech Extraliga for BK Mladá Boleslav during the 2011–12 season. He also played in the Polska Hokej Liga for Naprzód Janów.

Before turning professional, Indra played in the Ontario Hockey League for the Sarnia Sting, who drafted him 41st overall in the 2007 CHL Import Draft.
