= Martin Parýzek =

Czech ice hockey player

- Born: March 23, 1989 (age 37) Záboří, Czechoslovakia
- Height: 6 ft 1 in (185 cm)
- Weight: 185 lb (84 kg; 13 st 3 lb)
- Position: Defence
- Shoots: Left
- Czech 2. liga team Former teams: IHC Písek; HC České Budějovice; HC Karlovy Vary; Orlik Opole
- Playing career: 2009–present

Martin Parýzek (born 23 March 1989) is a former Czech professional ice hockey defenceman, who recently played for IHC Písek of the Czech 2. liga.

Parýzek previously played in the Czech Extraliga with Motor České Budějovice and HC Karlovy Vary.

== Career statistics ==
			Regular season					Playoffs
Season	Team	League	GP	G	A	Pts	PIM	GP	G	A	Pts	PIM
2003–04	IHC Pisek U18	Czech U18 2	34	0	3	3	8	—	—	—	—	—
2004–05	HC České Budějovice U18	Czech U18	46	3	6	9	50	—	—	—	—	—
2005–06	HC České Budějovice U18	Czech U18	1	0	1	1	2	—	—	—	—	—
2005–06	HC České Budějovice U20	Czech U20	43	1	3	4	26	6	0	1	1	2
2006–07	HC Mountfield U20	Czech U20	40	6	12	18	85	3	0	0	0	6
2006–07	HC Mountfield	Czech	4	0	0	0	0	—	—	—	—	—
2007–08	Ottawa 67's	OHL	58	4	26	30	73	4	0	0	0	0
2008–09	Ottawa 67's	OHL	62	5	23	28	46	7	0	2	2	6
2009–10	HC Energie Karlovy Vary	Czech	48	0	3	3	36	—	—	—	—	—
2009–10	KLH Chomutov	Czech2	—	—	—	—	—	2	0	0	0	0
2010–11	HC Energie Karlovy Vary	Czech	25	0	0	0	14	—	—	—	—	—
2011–12	HC Energie Karlovy Vary	Czech	6	0	0	0	6	—	—	—	—	—
2011–12	IHC Pisek	Czech2	16	1	1	2	20	—	—	—	—	—
2011–12	HC Most	Czech2	28	0	4	4	16	—	—	—	—	—
2012–13	HC Energie Karlovy Vary	Czech	6	0	0	0	4	—	—	—	—	—
2012–13	HC Most	Czech2	43	1	4	5	59	—	—	—	—	—
2013–14	HC Energie Karlovy Vary	Czech	17	0	3	3	4	—	—	—	—	—
2013–14	HC Baník Sokolov	Czech3	19	2	8	10	8	9	0	4	4	2
2014–15	HC Energie Karlovy Vary	Czech	—	—	—	—	—	—	—	—	—	—
2014–15	HC Motor České Budějovice	Czech2	11	0	1	1	8	—	—	—	—	—
2014–15	HC Havlíčkův Brod	Czech2	18	3	2	5	16	—	—	—	—	—
2015–16	HC Dukla Jihlava	Czech2	25	1	3	4	6	10	0	2	2	4
2016–17	Orlik Opole	Poland	34	4	9	13	22	5	0	0	0	4
2017–18	IHC Písek	Czech3	30	5	5	10	68	—	—	—	—	—
2018–19	IHC Písek	Czech3	38	9	19	28	16	5	0	0	0	8
2019–20	EHF Passau Black Hawks	Germany4	—	—	—	—	—	—	—	—	—	—
2020–21	IHC Králové Písek	Czech3	2	0	3	3	2	—	—	—	—	—
Czech totals			106	0	6	6	64	—	—	—	—	—
Czech2 totals			141	6	15	21	125	12	0	2	2	4
Czech3 totals			89	16	35	51	94	14	0	4	4	10
