= Todd Perry (ice hockey) =

Canadian ice hockey player

- Born: December 13, 1986 (age 38); Ingleside, Ontario, Canada
- Height: 6 ft 3 in (191 cm)
- Weight: 215 lb (98 kg; 15 st 5 lb)
- Position: Defence
- Shoots: Left
- ECHL team Former teams: Reading Royals; Toronto Marlies; Worcester Sharks; Admiral Vladivostok
- NHL draft: Undrafted
- Playing career: 2007–present

Todd Perry (born December 13, 1986) is a Canadian professional ice hockey player with the Reading Royals of the ECHL.

== Playing career ==
Perry was born in Ingleside, Ontario. He spent both the 2004–05 and 2005–06 season playing for the Barrie Colts but was traded to the London Knights after spending two seasons with the Colts. Perry played with the London Knights for the 2006–07 season, recording 1 goal and 18 assists for 19 points in 67 games.

After playing four professional seasons in Russia, culminating in a 9-game stint with Admiral Vladivostok in the Kontinental Hockey League, Perry returned to North America in signing a one-year ECHL contract with former club, the Reading Royals, for the 2015–16 season on October 7, 2015.

== Career statistics ==
| | | | Regular season | | | | | Playoffs |
| Season | Team | League | GP | G | A | Pts | PIM | GP | G | A | Pts | PIM |
|---|---|---|---|---|---|---|---|---|---|---|---|---|
| 2002–03 | Brockville Braves | CJHL | 55 | 3 | 28 | 31 | 80 | — | — | — | — | — |
| 2003–04 | Brockville Braves | CJHL | 38 | 7 | 16 | 23 | 108 | — | — | — | — | — |
| 2004–05 | Boston College | HE | 3 | 0 | 0 | 0 | 0 | — | — | — | — | — |
| 2004–05 | Barrie Colts | OHL | 29 | 0 | 8 | 8 | 46 | 6 | 0 | 0 | 0 | 13 |
| 2005–06 | Barrie Colts | OHL | 67 | 4 | 20 | 24 | 165 | 14 | 2 | 3 | 5 | 29 |
| 2006–07 | London Knights | OHL | 67 | 1 | 18 | 19 | 129 | 16 | 2 | 4 | 6 | 36 |
| 2007–08 | Columbia Inferno | ECHL | 55 | 6 | 22 | 28 | 73 | 13 | 0 | 0 | 0 | 14 |
| 2007–08 | Toronto Marlies | AHL | 8 | 0 | 1 | 1 | 8 | — | — | — | — | — |
| 2008–09 | Toronto Marlies | AHL | 70 | 2 | 5 | 7 | 81 | 6 | 0 | 2 | 2 | 6 |
| 2009–10 | Toronto Marlies | AHL | 27 | 1 | 2 | 3 | 35 | — | — | — | — | — |
| 2009–10 | Reading Royals | ECHL | 5 | 0 | 1 | 1 | 0 | 16 | 0 | 1 | 1 | 6 |
| 2010–11 | Reading Royals | ECHL | 63 | 4 | 18 | 22 | 115 | 8 | 0 | 3 | 3 | 40 |
| 2010–11 | Worcester Sharks | AHL | 2 | 0 | 0 | 0 | 0 | — | — | — | — | — |
| 2011–12 | Molot-Prikamie Perm | VHL | 52 | 7 | 13 | 20 | 58 | 3 | 1 | 1 | 2 | 2 |
| 2012–13 | Saryarka Karagandy | VHL | 40 | 5 | 6 | 11 | 24 | 21 | 0 | 3 | 3 | 32 |
| 2013–14 | Admiral Vladivostok | KHL | 9 | 0 | 0 | 0 | 22 | — | — | — | — | — |
| 2013–14 | Buran Voronezh | VHL | 12 | 0 | 5 | 5 | 33 | 5 | 0 | 2 | 2 | 4 |
| 2014–15 | Yuzhny Ural Orsk | VHL | 32 | 1 | 6 | 7 | 55 | — | — | — | — | — |
| 2015–16 | Reading Royals | ECHL | 66 | 2 | 11 | 13 | 73 | 12 | 0 | 2 | 2 | 10 |
| AHL totals | | | 107 | 3 | 8 | 11 | 124 | 6 | 0 | 2 | 2 | 6 |
