= 2005 Memorial Cup =

Canadian junior men's ice hockey championship

Tournament details
- Venue(s): John Labatt Centre; London, Ontario
- Dates: May 21–29, 2005
- Teams: 4
- Host team: London Knights (OHL)
- TV partner: Rogers Sportsnet

Final positions
- Champions: London Knights (OHL) (1st title)

Tournament statistics
- Games played: 8
- Attendance: 71,240 (8,905 per game)

The Memorial Cup trophy

The 2005 Memorial Cup (branded as the 2005 Mastercard Memorial Cup for sponsorship reasons) was held May 21–29, 2005 at the John Labatt Centre in London, Ontario. It was the 87th annual Memorial Cup competition and determined the major junior ice hockey champion of the Canadian Hockey League (CHL). The Cup tournament featured the champions from the Western Hockey League (WHL), the Kelowna Rockets; the Quebec Major Junior Hockey League (QMJHL), the Rimouski Océanic; the Ottawa 67's representing the Ontario Hockey League (OHL); and the host team. Since the host team, the London Knights, won the Ontario Hockey League championship against the Ottawa 67's, the 67's earned the right to represent the OHL as the League runner-up.

The Knights had never won the Memorial Cup, unlike the other three teams, despite having a franchise for longer than any of the other three teams (40 seasons). The year 2005 marked both London's first-ever OHL championship and first Memorial Cup victory in its 40-year history.

== Round-robin standings ==
Pos	Team	Pld	W	L	GF	GA
1	London Knights (host) (OHL)	3	3	0	13	7
2	Rimouski Océanic (QMJHL)	3	2	1	11	10
3	Ottawa 67's (OHL runner-up)	3	1	2	8	11
4	Kelowna Rockets (WHL)	3	0	3	7	11

== Coverage ==
Media attention was unusually high, with the television ratings the highest ever recorded for the tournament. There were several reasons for this increase in media attention:

1. Lack of competition from the NHL Stanley Cup playoffs. The NHL's 2004–05 season was cancelled due to the aforementioned lockout, which made the Memorial Cup the most important North American hockey playoff tournament at the time of the event. Furthermore, some of the young prospects were able to play for their junior teams instead of playing for their affiliated NHL teams. As such, the higher-skilled junior players helped facilitate more competitive games.
2. The presence of arguably two of the strongest teams ever in junior hockey:
  1. The London Knights went 31 games in a row undefeated to begin their season, setting a new CHL record. The team was ranked first in the weekly CHL rankings for the entire length of the season. The Knights had also never won the Memorial Cup in their entire 40-year history, providing the opportunity for the team to win their first Cup in London.
  2. The Rimouski Océanic, with superstar Sidney Crosby, went even longer undefeated at the end of the season and into the QMJHL playoffs, setting a new League record with 28 games undefeated. They actually went 35 games without losing including the regular season and QMJHL playoffs, with a third-round loss to Chicoutimi being their only loss in the QMJHL in the 2005 calendar year half of the 2004–05 season. As the CHL did not count the playoff games towards their streak, London's mark remains the longest in the record books, a fact that the Océanic used as motivation. 2005 was also to be Crosby's last year in the CHL and final opportunity to win the Memorial Cup.
3. The Kelowna Rockets were the defending Memorial Cup champions.
4. The Ottawa 67's, coached by the "legendary" Brian Kilrea, finished in a distant 6th place in their conference but made a strong playoff performance to come back to face the Knights in the OHL final.

== Rosters ==
Kelowna Rockets (WHL)	London Knights (host)
Goaltenders: 1 - Mike Wall; 30 - Kristrofer Westblom; 31 - Derek Yeomans; Defensemen: 2 - Shea Weber; 3 - Darren Deschamps; 4 - Mike Card; 6 - Kevin Reinholt; 7 - Joe Colin; 25 - Liam Couture; 27 - Brett Palin; 28 - Kyle Cumiskey; Forwards: 8 - Tyler Mosienko; 9 - Chris Ray; 10 - Lauris Darzins; 12 - Kirt Hill; 14 - Blake Comeau; 15 - Tyler Spurgeon; 16 - Craig Cuthbert; 17 - Brent Howarth; 18 - Clayton Bauer; 19 - Justin Keller; 20 - Gary Sylvester; 21 - Michal Blanar; 24 - Troy Ofukanay; 29 - Troy Bodie; Head coach: Jeff Truitt	Goaltenders: 28 - Adam Dennis; 37 - Gerald Coleman; Defensemen: 2 - Frank Rediker; 3 - Marc Methot; 4 - Matt McCready; 16 - Steve Ferry; 25 - Danny Syvret; 27 - Ryan Martinelli; 52 - Jeff Whitfield; 55 - Daniel Girardi; 74 - Bryan Rodney; Forwards: 7 - Drew Larman; 10 - Josh Beaulieu; 11 - Trevor Kell; 17 - Rob Drummond; 23 - Kelly Thomson; 33 - Brandon Prust; 44 - Rob Schremp; 49 - Dan Fritsche; 57 - Jordan Foreman; 71 - Harrison Reed; 79 - Dylan Hunter; 87 - Adam Perry; 91 - Dave Bolland; 94 - Corey Perry; Head coach: Dale Hunter
Ottawa 67's (OHL)	Rimouski Océanic (QMJHL)
Goaltenders: 1 - Anthony Guadagnolo; 30 - Danny Battochio; 45 - Matthew Spezza; Defensemen: 2 - Brodie Beard; 3 - Nick Van Herpt; 4 - Will Colbert; 5 - David Jarram; 6 - Brad Staubitz; 22 - Robbie Lawrance; 77 - Derek Joslin; 85 - Elgin Reid; Forwards: 8 - Matt Lahey; 9 - Chris Hulit; 12 - Thomas Kiriakou; 17 - Bryan Bickell; 19 - Jakub Petruzalek; 21 - Pat Ouellette; 24 - Jeremy Akeson; 25 - Mark Mancari; 27 - Julian Talbot; 28 - Brad Bonello; 44 - Jamie VanderVeeken; 71 - Arron Alphonso; 83 - Lukas Kaspar; 88 - Jamie McGinn; Head coach: Brian Kilrea	Goaltenders: 30 - Cedrick Desjardins; 37 - Jean-Michel Filiatrault; 38 - Scott Fraser; Defensemen: 5 - Patrick Coulombe; 10 - Michal Sersen; 16 - Erick Tremblay; 17 - Jean-Michel Bolduc; 18 - Jamie Blom; 20 - Mario Scalzo; 25 - Francois Bolduc; 54 - Graham Bona; Forwards: 8 - Danny Stewart; 15 - Dany Roussin; 19 - Mark Tobin; 21 - Benoit Arsenault; 23 - Nicolas Bachand; 24 - Sebastien Aspirot; 26 - Jean-Sebastien Cote; 27 - Pierre-Olivier Landry; 28 - Zbynek Hrdel; 29 - Eric Neilson; 36 - Sebastien Laferriere; 72 - Francis Charette; 78 - Marc-Antoine Pouliot; 87 - Sidney Crosby; Head coach: Doris Labonte

== Schedule ==
=== Round robin ===
May 21, 2005	Rimouski	3–4 (OT)	London	John Labatt Centre

S. Crosby 06:37; M. Pouliot 09:09; D. Roussin 16:52 / Goals / M. Methot 02:37; D. Fritsche 21:44; C. Perry 44:02; M. Methot 69:36

May 22, 2005	Ottawa	3–2 (2OT)	Kelowna	John Labatt Centre

M. Mancari 26:56; E. Reid 42:55; B. Staubitz 95:41 / Goals / T. Bodie 04:34; B. Comeau 31:34

May 23, 2005	London	4–2	Kelowna	John Labatt Centre

D. Larman 07:16; C. Perry 27:22; C. Perry 34:02; D. Larman 46:50 / Goals / T. Bodie 00:39; D. Deschamps 50:46

May 24, 2005	Ottawa	3–4	Rimouski	John Labatt Centre

L. Kaspar 18:24; B. Staubitz 40:50; J. McGinn 52:28 / Goals / S. Crosby 11:18; D. Roussin 14:19; M. Pouliot 21:00; D. Roussin 47:00

May 25, 2005	Kelowna	3–4	Rimouski	John Labatt Centre

T. Spurgeon 22:14; B. Comeau 42:23; B. Comeau 46:14 / Goals / Z. Hrdel 17:01; S. Crosby 24:53; M. Scalzo 31:57; F. Bolduc 36:14

May 26, 2005	London	5–2	Ottawa	John Labatt Centre

D. Girardi 11:46; D. Hunter 24:56; D. Syvret 31:52; C. Perry 37:13; D. Fritsche 58:10 / Goals / C. Hulit 08:48; M. Mancari 40:53

=== Semifinal ===
May 28, 2005	Ottawa	4–7	Rimouski	John Labatt Centre

J. McGinn 05:43; J. McGinn 07:20; D. Joslin 42:11; J. Talbot 56:42 / Goals / S. Crosby 01:48; P. Coulombe 04:40; M. Pouliot 09:45; S. Crosby 21:41; P. Coulombe 43:27; M. Scalzo 46:46; S. Crosby 51:47

=== Final ===
May 29, 2005	Rimouski	0–4	London	John Labatt Centre

Goals / D. Fritsche 03:45; B. Rodney 17:00; D. Bolland 21:48; R. Schremp 42:34

== Scoring leaders ==
1. Sidney Crosby, RIM (6g, 5a, 11pts)
2. Marc-Antoine Pouliot, RIM (3g, 7a, 10pts)
3. Dany Roussin, RIM (3g, 6a, 9pts)
4. Mario Scalzo, RIM (2g, 7a, 9pts)
5. Corey Perry, LDN (4g, 3a, 7pts)
6. Patrick Coulombe, RIM (2g, 5a, 7pts)
7. Dan Fritsche, LDN (3g, 3a, 6pts)
8. Rob Schremp, LDN (1g, 5a, 6pts)
9. Danny Syvret, LDN (1g, 4a, 5pts)
10. Dylan Hunter, LDN (1g, 4a, 5pts)

== Leading goaltenders ==
1. Adam Dennis, LDN (1.58 gaa, .936 sv%)
2. Kristofer Westblom, KEL (3.08 gaa, .910 sv%)
3. Cedrick Desjardins, RIM (3.69 gaa, .914 sv%)
4. Danny Battochio, OTT (3.93 gaa, .907 sv%)

== Award winners ==
- Stafford Smythe Memorial Trophy (MVP): Corey Perry, London
- George Parsons Trophy (sportsmanship): Marc-Antoine Pouliot, Rimouski
- Hap Emms Memorial Trophy (goaltender): Adam Dennis, London
- Ed Chynoweth Trophy (leading scorer): Sidney Crosby, Rimouski

All-Star Team

- Goal: Adam Dennis, London
- Defence: Danny Syvret, London; Mario Scalzo, Rimouski
- Forwards: Corey Perry, London; Dan Fritsche, London; Sidney Crosby, Rimouski

== The road to the cup ==
=== WHL playoffs ===
Conference quarterfinals	Conference semifinals
E1	Brandon	4
E4	Moose Jaw	1
E1	Brandon	4
C3	Calgary	3
C2	Lethbridge	1
C3	Calgary	4
Eastern
C1	Medicine Hat	4
C4	Red Deer	3
C1	Medicine Hat	2
E3	Prince Albert	4
E2	Saskatoon	0
E3	Prince Albert	4
B1	Kootenay	4
B4	Kamloops	2
B1	Kootenay	4
U3	Everett	0
U2	Portland	3
U3	Everett	4
Western
B2	Kelowna	4
B3	Vancouver	2
B2	Kelowna	4
U1	Seattle	3
U1	Seattle	4
U4	Tri-City	1

Conference finals
E1	Brandon	4
E3	Prince Albert	3
B1	Kootenay	2
B2	Kelowna	4

WHL Championship
E1	Brandon	1
B2	Kelowna	4

=== OHL playoffs ===
Conference quarterfinals
E1	Mississauga	1
E8	Toronto	4
E2	Peterborough	4
E7	Belleville	1
E3	Barrie	2
E6	Ottawa	4
E4	Brampton	2
E5	Sudbury	4
W1	London	4
W8	Guelph	0
W2	S.S. Marie	3
W7	Windsor	4
W3	Owen Sound	4
W6	Plymouth	0
W4	Kitchener	4
W5	Erie	2

Conference semifinals
E8	Toronto	1
E2	Peterborough	4
E6	Ottawa	4
E5	Sudbury	2
W1	London	4
W7	Windsor	0
W3	Owen Sound	0
W4	Kitchener	4

Conference finals
E2	Peterborough	0
E6	Ottawa	4
W1	London	4
W4	Kitchener	1

Finals
E6	Ottawa	1
W1	London	4

=== QMJHL playoffs ===
First round
7	Shawinigan	0
10	Lewiston	4
4	Chicoutimi	4
13	Baie-Comeau	2
5	Québec	4
12	Victoriaville	3
8	Gatineau	4
9	Cape Breton	1
6	Moncton	4
11	Drummondville	2

Quarterfinals
1	Rimouski	4
10	Lewiston	0
4	Chicoutimi	4
5	Québec	2
2	Halifax	4
8	Gatineau	1
3	Rouyn-Noranda	4
6	Moncton	2

Semifinals
1	Rimouski	4
4	Chicoutimi	1
2	Halifax	4
3	Rouyn-Noranda	0

Finals
1	Rimouski	4
2	Halifax	0
