= Blake Comeau =

Canadian ice hockey player (born 1986)

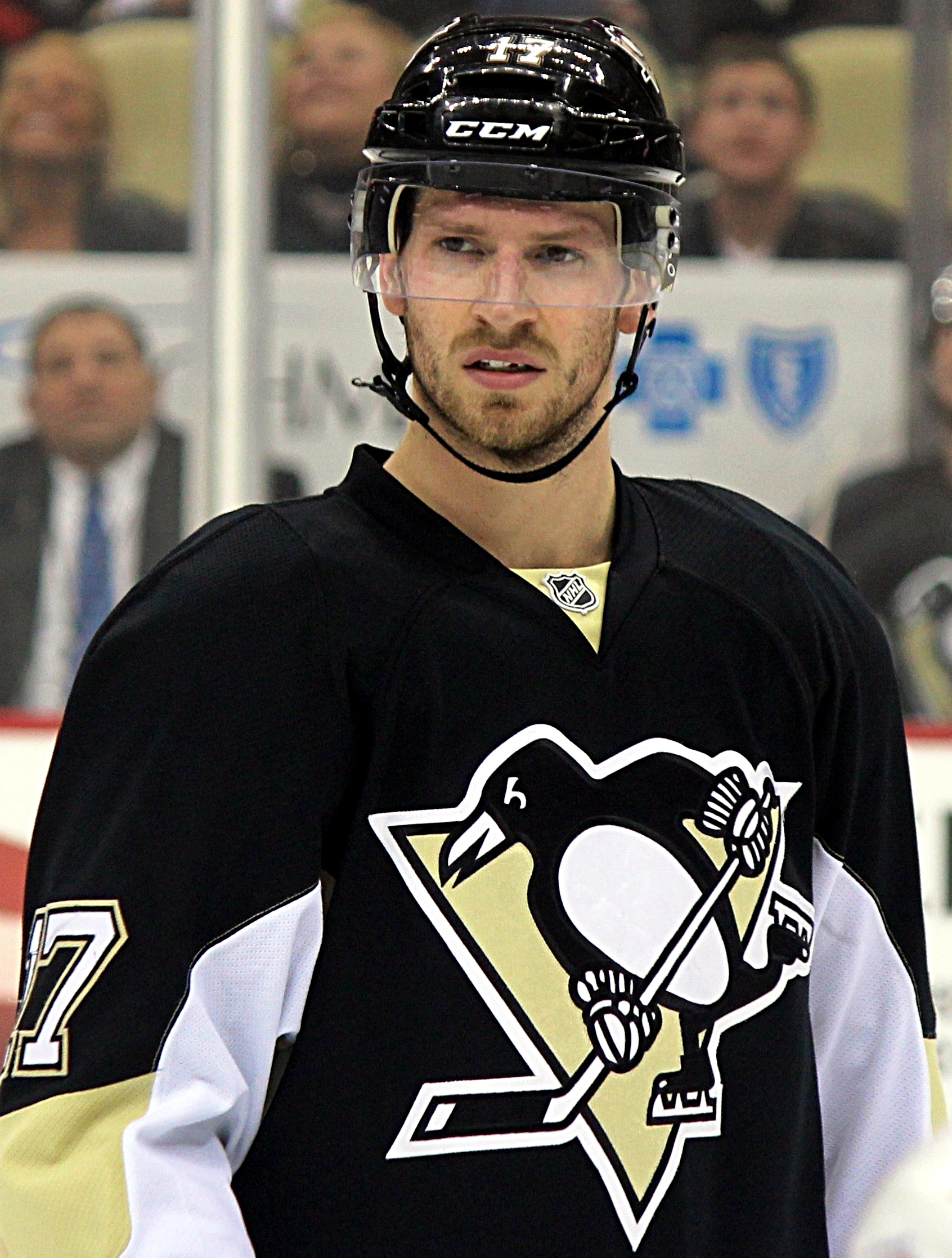
- Comeau with the Pittsburgh Penguins in 2014
- Born: February 18, 1986 (age 40) Meadow Lake, Saskatchewan, Canada
- Height: 6 ft 1 in (185 cm)
- Weight: 202 lb (92 kg; 14 st 6 lb)
- Position: Right wing
- Shot: Right
- Played for: New York Islanders; Calgary Flames; Columbus Blue Jackets; Pittsburgh Penguins; Colorado Avalanche; Dallas Stars
- NHL draft: 47th overall, 2004; New York Islanders
- Playing career: 2006–2021

Blake Comeau (born February 18, 1986) is a Canadian former professional ice hockey right winger who played in the National Hockey League (NHL). He was selected in the second round, 47th overall, by the New York Islanders at the 2004 NHL entry draft. He played five seasons in the Islanders organization before joining the Calgary Flames in 2011–12. He has also played in the NHL for the Columbus Blue Jackets, Pittsburgh Penguins, Colorado Avalanche and the Dallas Stars.

Comeau had a successful major junior career, winning two Western Hockey League (WHL) championships and one Memorial Cup as a member of the Kelowna Rockets. He was also a member of Canada's gold medal-winning team at the 2006 World Junior Hockey Championship. He is often described as a modern NHL journeyman, having played for numerous clubs in his professional career thus far.

== Early life ==
Comeau is son of George and Lynn Comeau. He was raised in Meadow Lake, Saskatchewan.

== Playing career ==
=== Junior ===
Comeau played four seasons in the Western Hockey League (WHL) for the Kelowna Rockets. He was a second round selection of the team in the 2001 WHL Bantam Draft. After appearing in three games as a 15-year-old, Comeau joined the Rockets full-time in 2002–03, where he scored 23 points in 56 games. He appeared in 19 playoff games as the Rockets won the President's Cup. Comeau improved to 33 points in 2003–04, and while the Rockets failed to repeat as WHL champions, they qualified for the 2004 Memorial Cup as tournament hosts. Comeau and the Rockets won the national championship with a 2–1 victory in the final game over the Gatineau Olympiques.

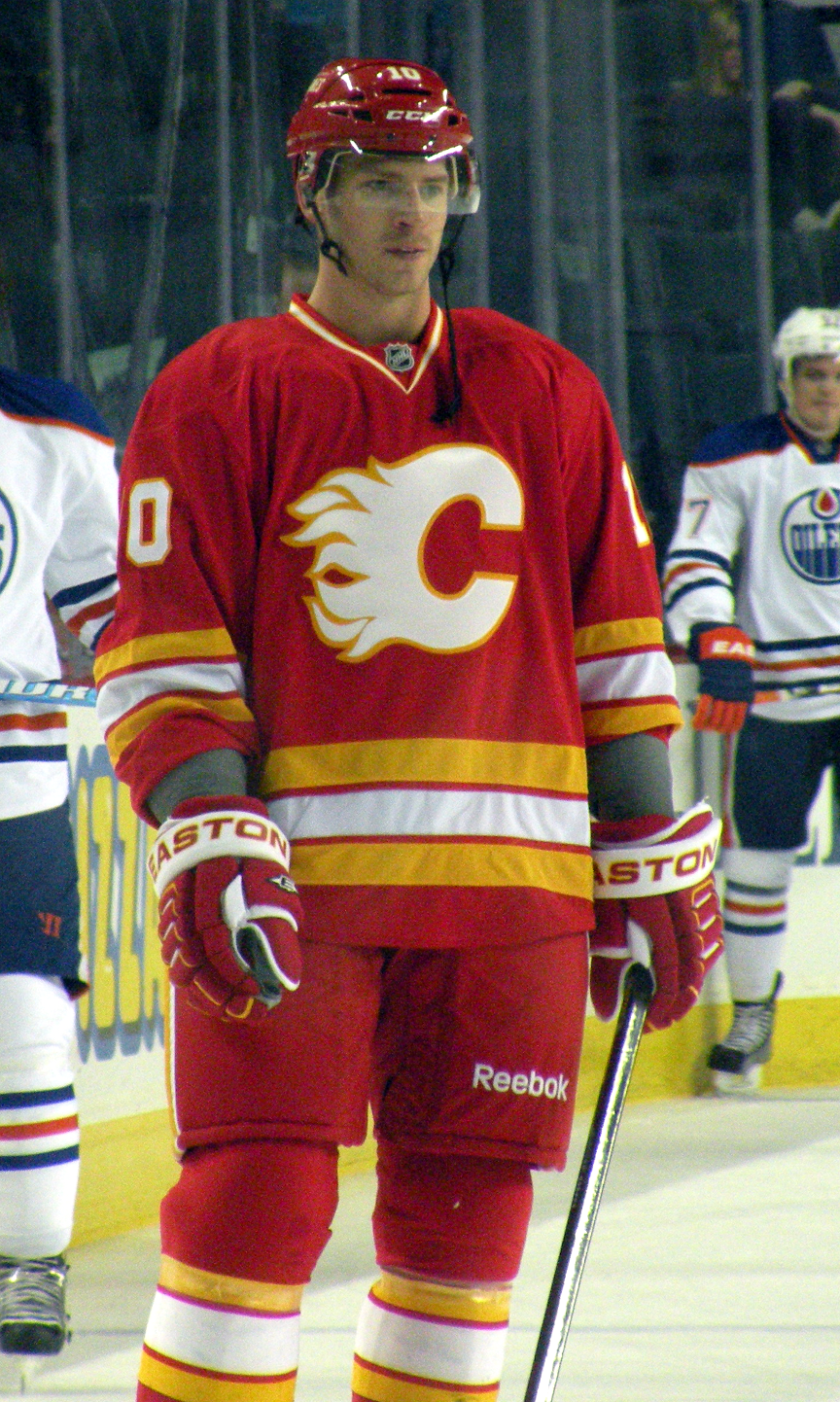
Comeau during his tenure with the Flames.

Following the triumph, Comeau was selected by the New York Islanders as their second round selection, 47th overall, at the 2004 NHL entry draft. He returned to the Rockets for the 2004–05 season, where he scored 24 goals and 47 points. He also added 18 points in 24 playoff games as the Rockets won their second President's Cup in three years. The Rockets failed to defend their title at the 2005 Memorial Cup, however, losing all three games they played.

Comeau completed his junior career in 2005–06. He scored 74 points in 60 games and was named to the WHL's Western Conference All-Star Team. He then joined the Canadian junior team for the 2006 World Junior Hockey Championship. Comeau led Team Canada in scoring with seven points in six games to lead Canada to its second consecutive gold medal. Comeau began his professional career to conclude the season, joining the Islanders' American Hockey League (AHL) affiliate, the Bridgeport Sound Tigers, for seven playoff games.

=== Professional ===
==== New York Islanders ====
The Islanders assigned Comeau to the Sound Tigers for the 2005–06 season, where he scored 43 points in 61 games. He earned a brief recall of three games to the Islanders and made his NHL debut on December 7, 2006, against the Montreal Canadiens. Comeau split the 2006–07 season between New York and Bridgeport. He had 19 points in 31 AHL games and 15 points in 51 NHL games. He scored his first NHL goal, against Dany Sabourin of the Pittsburgh Penguins, in a 4–2 victory on December 21, 2007. Comeau again split season between New York and Bridgeport in 2008–09, scoring 25 points in 53 games with the Islanders. He finally earned a permanent spot with the NHL team in 2009–10. Comeau scored 17 goals and 35 points in 61 games. He scored his first career hat-trick on March 2, 2010, in a 5–3 victory over the Chicago Blackhawks. He established career highs in 2010–11 with 24 goals, 22 assists and 46 points, a season which earned Comeau a one-year, $2.5 million contract from the Islanders.

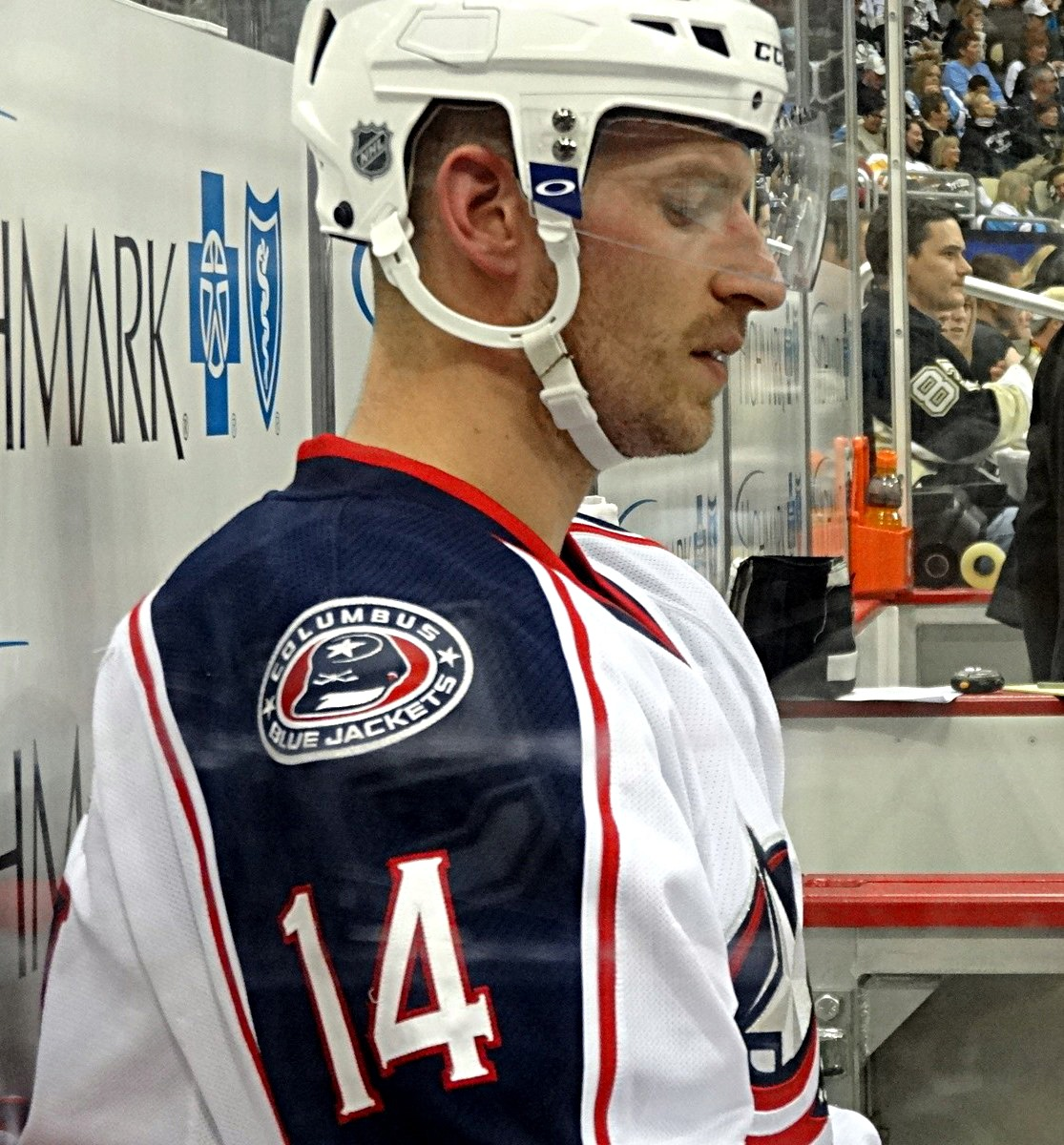
Comeau with the Blue Jackets in 2013.

==== Calgary Flames ====
Comeau struggled to begin the 2011–12 season, and after failing to register a point in 16 games, was placed on waivers by the Islanders, where he was claimed by the Calgary Flames. He scored five goals and 15 points with the Flames. Comeau became a restricted free agent following the season; the Flames would have had to give him a qualifying offer at least equal to his last contract to retain his rights. The Flames declined to offer him a contract, and he subsequently became an unrestricted free agent. Despite this, Comeau chose to re-sign with the Flames, taking a 50% pay cut to do so; the two parties agreed on a one-year, $1.25 million contract for 2012–13.

==== Columbus Blue Jackets ====
Days before the 2013 NHL trade deadline, Comeau was traded to the Columbus Blue Jackets in exchange for a 2013 fifth-round draft pick. Comeau finished the season with 5 points in 9 games. A knee injury limited him to 61 games the following year.

==== Pittsburgh Penguins ====
On July 1, 2014, Comeau signed a one-year contract as a free agent with the Pittsburgh Penguins for the 2014–15 season. Comeau proved a solid addition to the Penguins, proving his versatility in skating alongside, Sidney Crosby and Evgeni Malkin. On November 26, 2014, he scored his second career hat-trick, with two goals scored during regulation and one as the game-winning overtime, against the Toronto Maple Leafs. Comeau scored 11 goals in 32 games before he suffered a wrist injury against the Florida Panthers on December 22. Having missed 20 games, Comeau later returned to the line-up however was still hampered by his wrist to suffer a drop in production. Despite his injury, Comeau still recorded his best year since 2011 with the Islanders, in producing 16 goals, including a team leading 5 game-winning tallies, and 31 points in 61 games. Comeau recorded his first post-season goal against the New York Rangers on April 16, 2015.

==== Colorado Avalanche ====
On July 1, 2015, Comeau signed a three-year contract as a free agent with the Colorado Avalanche holding an average value of $2.4 million a year. He made his debut with the Avalanche in the 2015–16 season on opening night in a 5-4 defeat to the Minnesota Wild on October 8, 2015. In adding a missing versatility to the Avalanche bottom 6 forwards, Comeau became a staple of the team's penalty killing unit alongside Carl Söderberg. On November 14, 2015, in his 500th career game, Comeau registered his first goal in an Avalanche uniform, marking his 200th NHL point in a 6-1 defeat of the Montreal Canadiens. On March 28, 2016, Comeau scored his 100th career goal, adding the opening marker in 4-3 victory over the Nashville Predators. Unable to help Colorado qualify for the post-season, Comeau contributed with 12 goals and a career best 24 assists for 36 points in 81 games. On March 4, 2017, in the midst of the worst season in Colorado history, Comeau became an infamous viral sensation when he passed to a teammate behind him on a breakaway, which was intercepted by a Winnipeg player. The Avalanche were losing 5-0 at the time.

In his final season with the club, Comeau recorded 13 goals and 21 assists in 79 games. The Avalanche qualified for the postseason for the first time since 2014, matching up with the Western Conference-leading Nashville Predators. Comeau scored two goals in six games during their first-round exit.

==== Dallas Stars ====
On July 1, 2018, Comeau left the Avalanche organization after three seasons to join the Dallas Stars on a three-year, $7.2 million contract. "I didn't want to waste their time or my time," Comeau said of meeting with other teams. "It's important that I'm on a team that I think can win. Dallas has all those pieces and also wants to improve. That was very appealing to me."

In February 2020, Comeau was made an alternate captain along with teammate Esa Lindell. Comeau and John Klingberg serve as alternate captains during road games, while Lindell and Tyler Seguin serve as alternate captains during home games.

Following the conclusion of his three-year contract, on June 21, 2021, Comeau signed a one-year extension for the 2021–22 season to remain with the Stars.

== Career statistics ==
=== Regular season and playoffs ===
			Regular season					Playoffs
Season	Team	League	GP	G	A	Pts	PIM	GP	G	A	Pts	PIM
2001–02	Kelowna Rockets	WHL	3	0	0	0	4	—	—	—	—	—
2002–03	Kelowna Rockets	WHL	54	5	18	23	77	19	2	1	3	20
2003–04	Kelowna Rockets	WHL	71	10	23	33	123	17	4	2	6	23
2004–05	Kelowna Rockets	WHL	65	24	23	47	108	24	6	12	18	34
2005–06	Kelowna Rockets	WHL	60	21	53	74	85	12	4	9	13	22
2005–06	Bridgeport Sound Tigers	AHL	—	—	—	—	—	7	0	3	3	0
2006–07	Bridgeport Sound Tigers	AHL	61	12	31	43	46	—	—	—	—	—
2006–07	New York Islanders	NHL	3	0	0	0	0	—	—	—	—	—
2007–08	Bridgeport Sound Tigers	AHL	31	4	15	19	30	—	—	—	—	—
2007–08	New York Islanders	NHL	51	8	7	15	22	—	—	—	—	—
2008–09	Bridgeport Sound Tigers	AHL	19	4	15	19	22	2	0	0	0	0
2008–09	New York Islanders	NHL	53	7	18	25	32	—	—	—	—	—
2009–10	New York Islanders	NHL	61	17	18	35	40	—	—	—	—	—
2010–11	New York Islanders	NHL	77	24	22	46	43	—	—	—	—	—
2011–12	New York Islanders	NHL	16	0	0	0	6	—	—	—	—	—
2011–12	Calgary Flames	NHL	58	5	10	15	24	—	—	—	—	—
2012–13	Calgary Flames	NHL	33	4	3	7	14	—	—	—	—	—
2012–13	Columbus Blue Jackets	NHL	9	2	3	5	6	—	—	—	—	—
2013–14	Columbus Blue Jackets	NHL	61	5	11	16	36	6	0	0	0	10
2014–15	Pittsburgh Penguins	NHL	61	16	15	31	65	5	1	0	1	8
2015–16	Colorado Avalanche	NHL	81	12	24	36	58	—	—	—	—	—
2016–17	Colorado Avalanche	NHL	77	8	12	20	58	—	—	—	—	—
2017–18	Colorado Avalanche	NHL	79	13	21	34	50	6	2	0	2	2
2018–19	Dallas Stars	NHL	77	7	11	18	42	13	1	1	2	16
2019–20	Dallas Stars	NHL	55	8	8	16	36	23	2	5	7	30
2020–21	Dallas Stars	NHL	51	4	10	14	37	—	—	—	—	—
2021–22	Dallas Stars	NHL	6	1	0	1	4	—	—	—	—	—
NHL totals			909	141	193	334	573	53	6	6	12	66

Medal record

Representing Canada

Men's ice hockey

World Junior Championship
Gold medal – first place	2006 Canada	

=== International ===
Year	Team	Event	Result	GP	G	A	Pts	PIM
2003	Canada	U18	4th	5	0	0	0	6
2006	Canada	WJC	1st place, gold medalist(s)	6	3	4	7	8
Junior totals				11	3	4	7	14

== Awards and honours ==
Award	Year
WHL
West First All-Star Team	2006
