= Bryan Rodney =

Canadian ice hockey player

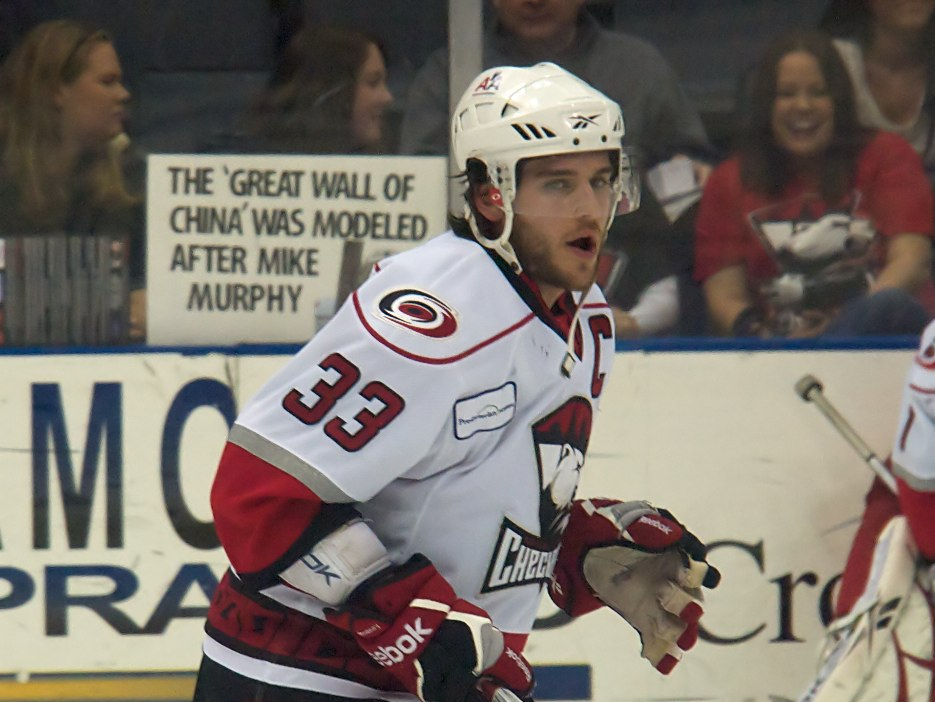
- Born: April 22, 1984 (age 42) London, Ontario, Canada
- Height: 6 ft 0 in (183 cm)
- Weight: 201 lb (91 kg; 14 st 5 lb)
- Position: Defence
- Shot: Right
- Played for: Carolina Hurricanes; Edmonton Oilers; HC Bolzano; HC Karlovy Vary
- NHL draft: Undrafted
- Playing career: 2005–2016

Bryan Rodney (born April 22, 1984) is a Canadian former professional ice hockey defenceman who played in the National Hockey League (NHL) for the Carolina Hurricanes and the Edmonton Oilers. He won the Memorial Cup in 2005 with the London Knights.

== Playing career ==
Rodney signed a one-year contract with the Anaheim Ducks on July 5, 2011. He was traded to the Edmonton Oilers for Ryan O'Marra on February 16, 2012. Without a contract due to the 2012 NHL lockout, Rodney eventually signed as a free agent midway through the 2012–13 season, to an AHL deal with the Manchester Monarchs for the remainder of the campaign on December 3, 2012.

On July 29, 2013, Rodney secured an NHL contract as a free agent, signing a one-year, two-way deal with the Nashville Predators. He was assigned to AHL affiliate, the Milwaukee Admirals for the duration of the 2013–14 season.

On October 8, 2014, he signed as a free agent a one-year contract with HC Bolzano, the Italian-based team, who plays in the Austrian Hockey League.

He signed a one-year contract with Czech hockey team HC Energie.

== Career statistics ==
			Regular season					Playoffs
Season	Team	League	GP	G	A	Pts	PIM	GP	G	A	Pts	PIM
2000–01	Ottawa 67's	OHL	65	0	15	15	26	20	1	4	5	20
2001–02	Ottawa 67's	OHL	30	3	8	11	14	—	—	—	—	—
2001–02	Kingston Frontenacs	OHL	18	2	8	10	8	1	0	0	0	0
2002–03	Kingston Frontenacs	OHL	67	8	52	60	60	—	—	—	—	—
2003–04	Kingston Frontenacs	OHL	67	11	65	76	68	6	1	4	5	8
2004–05	London Knights	OHL	64	23	39	62	48	12	5	10	15	20
2005–06	Charlotte Checkers	ECHL	59	4	21	25	47	3	0	1	1	0
2005–06	Hartford Wolf Pack	AHL	8	1	2	3	0	—	—	—	—	—
2006–07	Charlotte Checkers	ECHL	31	2	19	21	14	—	—	—	—	—
2006–07	Columbia Inferno	ECHL	14	2	9	11	12	—	—	—	—	—
2007–08	Columbia Inferno	ECHL	17	2	9	11	10	—	—	—	—	—
2007–08	Elmira Jackals	ECHL	6	5	5	10	2	—	—	—	—	—
2007–08	Albany River Rats	AHL	42	4	11	15	22	7	3	3	6	2
2008–09	Albany River Rats	AHL	58	3	33	36	28	—	—	—	—	—
2008–09	Carolina Hurricanes	NHL	8	0	2	2	2	—	—	—	—	—
2009–10	Carolina Hurricanes	NHL	22	1	10	11	8	—	—	—	—	—
2009–10	Albany River Rats	AHL	54	7	28	35	42	8	0	4	4	8
2010–11	Charlotte Checkers	AHL	77	9	38	47	38	16	0	4	4	12
2010–11	Carolina Hurricanes	NHL	3	0	0	0	2	—	—	—	—	—
2011–12	Syracuse Crunch	AHL	41	5	15	20	10	—	—	—	—	—
2011–12	Oklahoma City Barons	AHL	26	1	9	10	18	14	2	8	10	12
2011–12	Edmonton Oilers	NHL	1	0	0	0	0	—	—	—	—	—
2012–13	Manchester Monarchs	AHL	44	4	11	15	10	—	—	—	—	—
2013–14	Milwaukee Admirals	AHL	65	5	29	34	20	3	1	2	3	0
2014–15	HC Bolzano	EBEL	45	6	20	26	22	7	1	3	4	0
2015–16	HC Karlovy Vary	ELH	18	1	0	1	10	—	—	—	—	—
NHL totals			34	1	12	13	12	—	—	—	—	—
