= Corey Perry =

Canadian ice hockey player (born 1985)

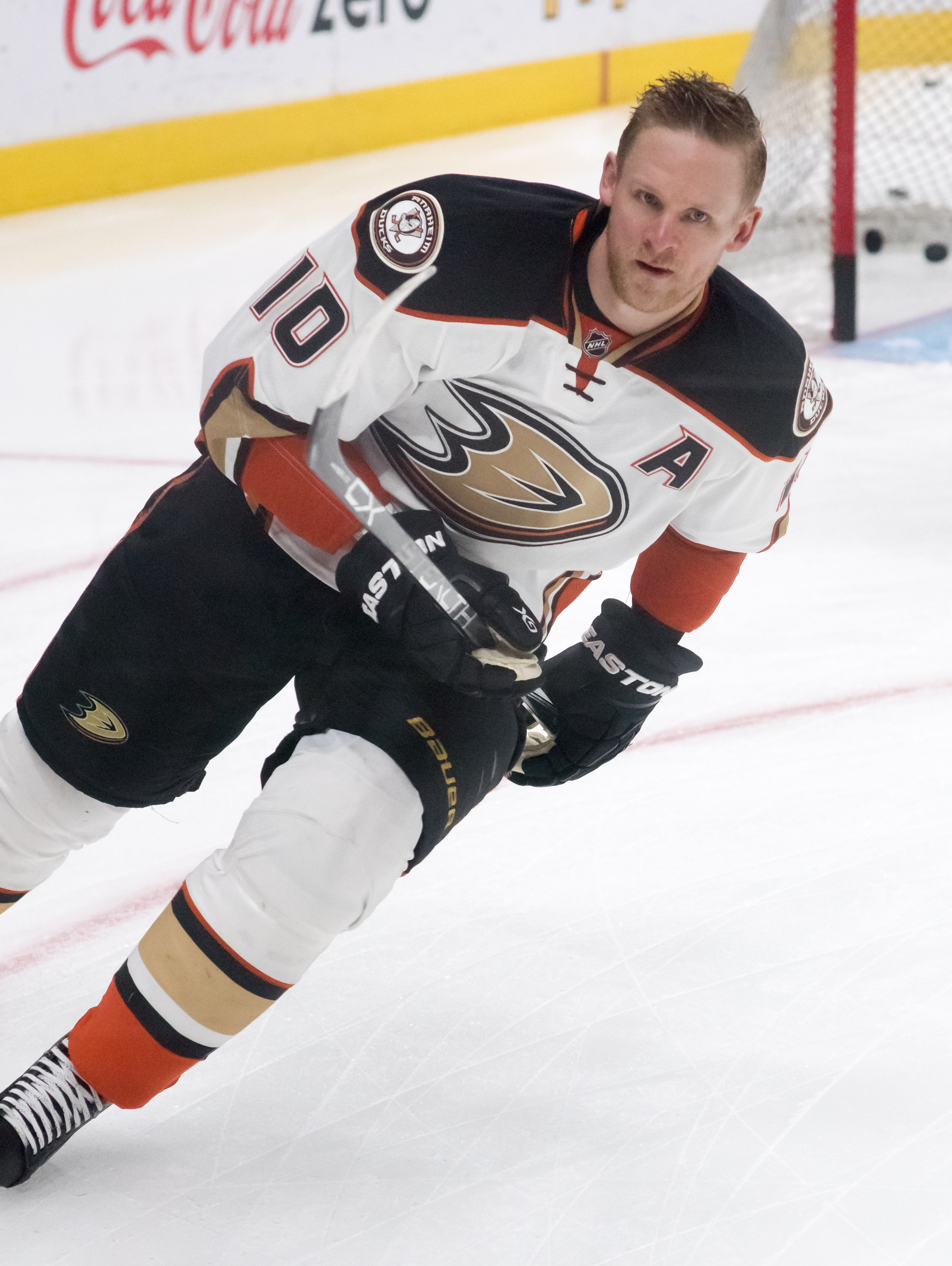
- Perry with the Anaheim Ducks in April 2016
- Born: May 16, 1985 (age 41) New Liskeard, Ontario, Canada
- Height: 6 ft 3 in (191 cm)
- Weight: 208 lb (94 kg; 14 st 12 lb)
- Position: Winger
- Shoots: Right
- NHL team Former teams: Los Angeles Kings; Anaheim Ducks; Dallas Stars; Montreal Canadiens; Tampa Bay Lightning; Chicago Blackhawks; Edmonton Oilers
- National team: Canada
- NHL draft: 28th overall, 2003; Mighty Ducks of Anaheim
- Playing career: 2004–present

Corey Perry (born May 16, 1985) is a Canadian professional ice hockey player who is a winger for the Los Angeles Kings of the National Hockey League (NHL). He played the first 14 years of his career with the Anaheim Ducks where he won the Stanley Cup in 2007. He has also played for the Dallas Stars, Montreal Canadiens, Chicago Blackhawks, Edmonton Oilers and Tampa Bay Lightning.

Perry is known for his goal-scoring ability and an abrasive playing style with an ability to get under his opponent's skin. The former earned him the affectionate nickname "Scorey Perry"; the latter the less affectionate "the Worm".

He won the Memorial Cup with the Ontario Hockey League (OHL)'s London Knights and a gold medal with Canada at the World Junior Championships during his major junior career. Perry was drafted in the first round, 28th overall, by the Mighty Ducks of Anaheim in the 2003 NHL entry draft and won the Stanley Cup with the club in 2007. In 2008, he recorded 29 goals and 25 assists. He improved in 2009 to 72 points and was named to his first NHL All-Star Game. Perry continued his ascent in 2010 as he scored 27 goals and had 49 assists. In 2011, he won the Hart Memorial Trophy as the league's most valuable player for the 2010–11 season. He led the NHL with 50 goals and finished third in points behind Daniel Sedin and Martin St. Louis, with 98. During his two one-year campaigns with the Dallas Stars and Montreal Canadiens respectively, Perry lost consecutive Stanley Cup Finals to the Tampa Bay Lightning in 2020 and 2021; Perry proceeded to join the Lightning the very next season, where he lost a third straight Final series in 2022, and in doing so became the first player in NHL history to lose three consecutive Final series with three different teams. Perry then returned to the Final for a fifth and sixth time with the Oilers in 2024 and 2025, losing both times, becoming the first player in NHL history to reach the Final with five different franchises, and the first player in NHL history to lose four Final series with four different teams.

Internationally, Perry has won gold medals with Canada at the 2010 and 2014 Winter Olympics. He became a member of the Triple Gold Club after captaining Canada to gold at the 2016 World Championship, in addition to previously winning the Stanley Cup and the Olympic gold medal. Perry is only the second player (joining Scott Niedermayer) to combine Triple Gold membership with gold at the World Junior Championships, a Memorial Cup win, and a World Cup of Hockey win.

== Early life ==
Perry was born on May 16, 1985, in New Liskeard, Ontario, the first of two boys born to Geoff and Nancy Perry. He and his brother Adam learned to skate when Corey was two. At age 10, he and his family moved from Haileybury, Ontario, to Peterborough, Ontario. Growing up, his favourite NHL team was the Montreal Canadiens.

== Playing career ==
=== Minor ===
Perry grew up playing hockey with the Peterborough Minor Petes AAA organization of the OMHA's Eastern AAA league. In 2001, Perry led his Petes to a victory in the inaugural OHL Cup Bantam AAA championship held in Peterborough. Perry had a stellar year offensively, scoring 73 goals in 67 games.

=== Junior ===
After a standout minor hockey career, Perry was drafted fifth overall into the Ontario Hockey League (OHL) by the London Knights in the 2001 Priority Draft. He immediately produced at a point-per-game pace for the Knights, recording 59 points in 60 games in his rookie season. The following year, his NHL entry draft year, Perry improved to 78 points and was selected 28th overall in the 2003 NHL entry draft by the Mighty Ducks of Anaheim.

In the 2003–04 season, Perry scored 40 goals and 73 assists for 113 points in just 66 games, becoming the first Knight to reach 100 points in a season since Jason Allison did so in 1994. During the season, the Ducks were considering trading Perry to the Edmonton Oilers for Mike Comrie. The Oilers agreed to acquire Perry for Comrie, though there was one snag in the deal; Edmonton general manager Kevin Lowe felt that Comrie should return $2.5 million of his salary. Comrie ultimately refused to do so and the trade subsequently fell through. In the OHL playoffs, Perry scored seven more goals, with his offensive prowess earning him a call-up to the Ducks' American Hockey League (AHL) affiliate, the Cincinnati Mighty Ducks, for the remainder of the 2003–04 season. Perry was later named an OHL first-team All-Star after the season.

Entering his fourth and final year with the Knights in 2004–05, Perry scored a junior career-high 130 points in 60 games. He went on to post an additional 38 points in the postseason to capture the J. Ross Robertson Cup as OHL champions, en route to a Memorial Cup championship. In 18 postseason games, Perry scored 11 goals and handed out 27 assists. The Knights shut-out Sidney Crosby's Rimouski Océanic in the final.

=== Professional (2005–present) ===
==== Anaheim Ducks (2005–2019) ====
Perry made his debut with the Ducks the following season, in 2005–06. However, he was sent down to the AHL early in the year, along with fellow rookie and future linemate Ryan Getzlaf. Perry scored his first career goal against the Edmonton Oilers on October 10, 2005, managing to score a point in each of his first four career games. He recorded his first career multi-goal game against the Los Angeles Kings on January 28, 2006. Perry and Getzlaf combined for 67 points in 36 games with the Portland Pirates – the Ducks' new AHL affiliate – and were subsequently recalled by the Ducks ahead of the team's run in the 2006 playoffs. Perry finished his rookie season with the Ducks with 25 points (13 goals, 12 assists) in 56 games. In the playoffs, Perry scored no goals but managed three assists as the Ducks were eliminated in the Western Conference Final to the eighth seeded Edmonton Oilers.

In 2006–07, his sophomore season, Perry improved to 44 points (17 goals, 27 assists) in all 82 games, playing with Ryan Getzlaf and Dustin Penner on a combination dubbed the "Kid Line". He went on in the 2007 playoffs to win the Stanley Cup with Anaheim, scoring 15 points (six goals, nine assists) in 21 games. He assisted on a goal by Ryan Getzlaf in game one against the Ottawa Senators in the Final while in game three, he scored a goal on Senators’ goaltender Ray Emery that helped the Ducks take the lead. After the Senators tied the score, Perry assisted on Getzlaf's goal as the Ducks took the lead again. However, the Senators scored the last three goals of the game and won 5–3. In the final game, Perry scored a goal and had an assist on a goal by Rob Neidermayer. Anaheim went on to win the next two games, securing its first-ever Stanley Cup.

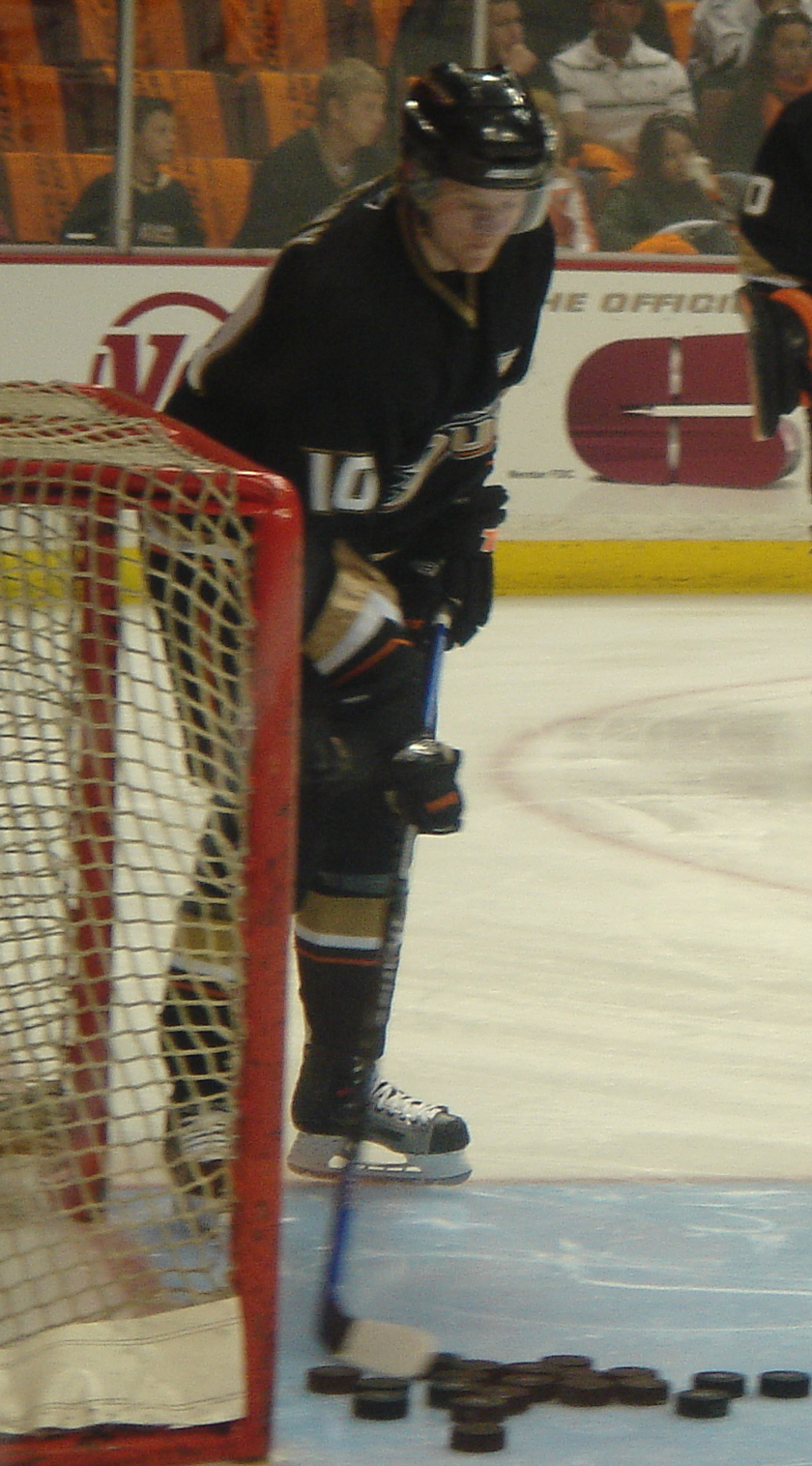
Perry during a pre-game warm up in April 2007

The following year, in 2007–08, Perry increased his totals to 29 goals, 25 assists and 54 points in 70 games and was named to his first NHL All-Star Game as an injury replacement (along with Scott Niedermayer) to join Chris Pronger and Ryan Getzlaf as four Ducks on the Western Conference squad. Perry also made Ducks history during the season – on January 4, 2008, in a game against the Chicago Blackhawks, he scored a goal just 16 seconds into the game, the second fastest goal ever scored by a Duck. Despite the personal successes of the year, the defending Stanley Cup champion Ducks were unable to replicate the previous year's playoff success, falling to the fifth seeded Dallas Stars in the first round of the 2008 playoffs in six games. Perry played in three games and had two goals and an assist.

On July 1, 2008, Perry signed a five-year, $26.625 million contract extension, identical to a contract Ryan Getzlaf had agreed to the previous off-season. The 2008–09 season was a break-out year for Perry. He led the Ducks with 32 goals and finished second on the team in points, with 72. On November 1, 2008, he recorded five points in a game against the Vancouver Canucks, four of which were assists, a career-high. However, on January 3, 2009, Perry was suspended for four games by the NHL after elbowing Philadelphia Flyers forward Claude Giroux during the third period of a game on January 2. Perry finished the regular season scoring four goals in the year's last five games. Continuing his scoring streak, he then contributed eight goals and six assists during the 2009 playoffs that saw the Ducks advance to game seven of the Western Conference semifinals against the defending Stanley Cup champion Detroit Red Wings, who ultimately ended the Ducks' season after their game seven victory. Perry scored the Ducks' second goal of that game. In game one, Perry scored a goal, but the Ducks lost 3–2, while the Ducks won game two as Perry contributed two assists. After recording no points in a Ducks win in game three, Perry scored two goals and also recorded an assist in game four, but the Ducks lost 6–3. In game seven, the Ducks lost the game, with Perry scoring a goal and providing an assist.

In the 2009–10, Perry posted a 19-game point streak that ultimately ended on December 4, 2009, against the Dallas Stars. He ended the year with a team-leading 76 points (27 goals, 49 assists) and 111 penalty minutes. He also finished second on the club with his 27 goals – trailing only Bobby Ryan's 35 – and second in assists, with his 49, one short of Ryan Getzlaf's 50.

The following year, the 2010–11 season, would be a career year for Perry. Perry led the NHL with 50 goals, winning the Maurice "Rocket" Richard Trophy as a result. With 48 assists, he finished the season with 98 points, third-highest in the NHL only behind Tampa Bay Lightning forward Martin St. Louis and Vancouver Canucks forward Daniel Sedin. Perry was also chosen to the 2011 NHL All-Star Game, where he won the Shootout Elimination Challenge in the Skills Competition. Perry recorded his first career hat-trick in a game against the Minnesota Wild on December 12; he also recorded two assists in the game, giving him five points. His goals came at even strength, shorthanded and on the power play, making him the second player in Ducks history to score in all three situations, the other being Paul Kariya. After the All-Star Game, Perry exploded offensively – from February 2 to 18, he recorded at least one point in seven consecutive games, and recorded his second career hat-trick on February 5 against the Colorado Avalanche. Nearing the end of the season, Perry continued his torrid scoring pace. On March 9, 2011, Perry scored two more goals, his 32nd and 33rd goal of the season against the New York Rangers on Rangers’ goaltender Henrik Lundqvist, surpassing his previous career-high, single-season goal tally. Perry scored another goal in a win against the Colorado Avalanche. In the next game, he scored the only two goals as the Ducks lost to the Phoenix Coyotes. From March 19 through April 6, Perry recorded a least a point in ten consecutive games, later taking the NHL scoring lead from Tampa Bay Lightning forward Steven Stamkos when he scored two goals in a 2–1 win against the Chicago Blackhawks on Blackhawks' goaltender Corey Crawford on March 26. He then recorded his third career hat-trick in a game against the San Jose Sharks on April 6, with his third of the game giving him 50 for the year. After reaching the mark, he became just the third Ducks player to record a 50-goal season, joining Teemu Selänne and Paul Kariya. Led by Perry's late-season scoring surge, the Ducks finished with 99 points, good for the fourth seed in the West, setting up a series with the fifth-seeded Nashville Predators in the first round of the 2011 playoffs. After being held to no points in game one, Perry scored the Ducks' first goal on a power play in game two against Pekka Rinne, later assisting on Ryan Getzlaf's goal that gave the Ducks a 3–1 lead. Near the end of the game, Perry then assisted on Bobby Ryan's empty-netter as the Ducks won 5–3. In game three, Perry recorded another two assists on goals by Teemu Selänne, but the Ducks fell 4–3. In game four, he set up Cam Fowler's power play goal early in the first period, and early in the third, Perry scored a short-handed goal to give Anaheim the lead in an eventual 6–3 victory. However, Perry recorded no points in the last two games, both of which the Ducks lost, eliminating them from the playoffs. Perry finished the series with two goals and six assists for eight points in all six games. At the end of the 2010–11 season, Perry won the Hart Memorial Trophy, prevailing over finalists Daniel Sedin of the Vancouver Canucks and Martin St. Louis of the Tampa Bay Lightning, as the NHL's regular season MVP. He became the first Ducks player to win the Hart Trophy and the first Ducks player to win the Maurice "Rocket" Richard Trophy since Teemu Selänne in 1998–99.

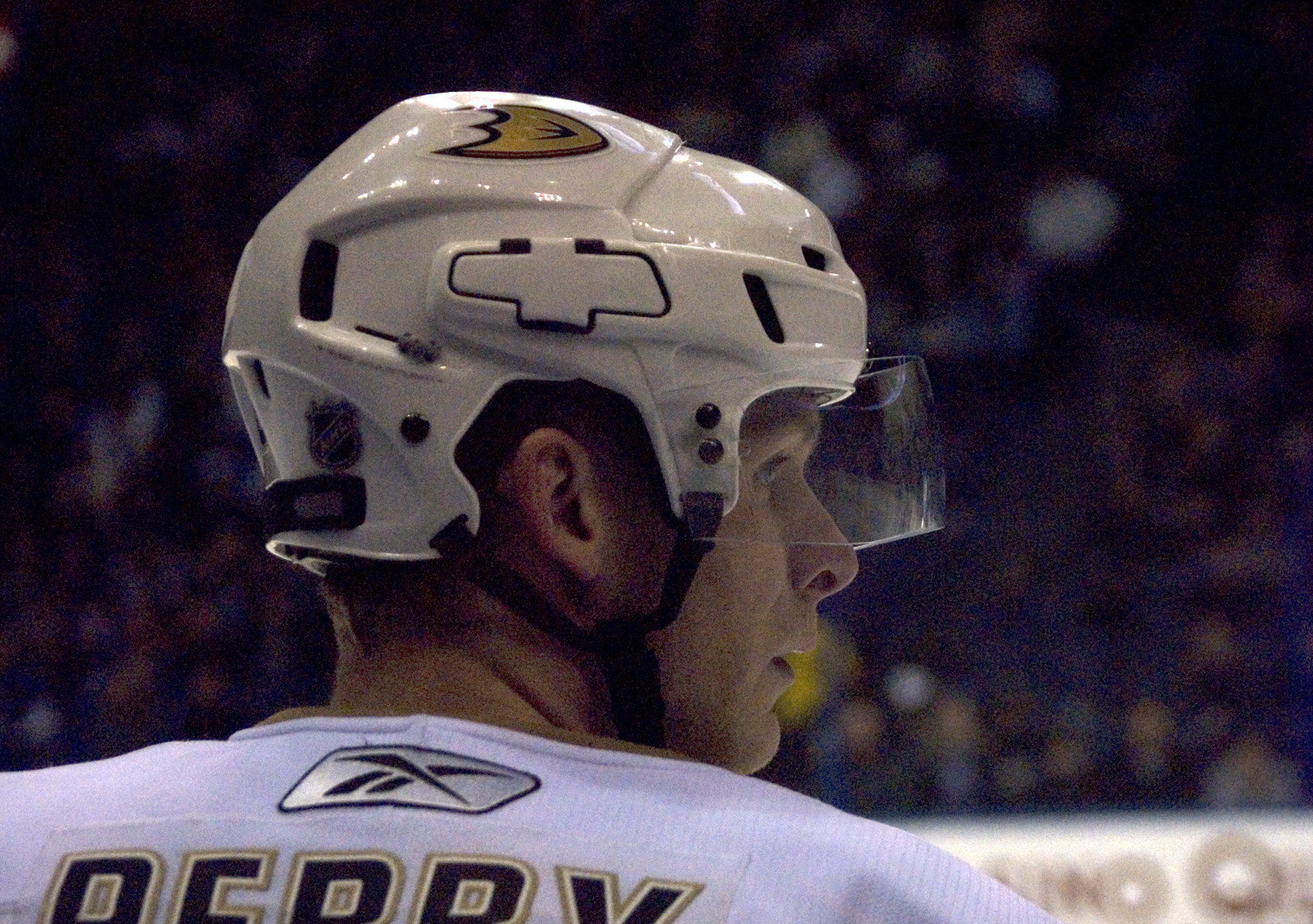
Perry with the Ducks in February 2011.

For the 2011–12 season, Perry struggled early in the season, along with the rest of the team. The year was considered an off-year for Perry and his teammates. Despite the early season struggles, Perry was named to the 2012 NHL All-Star Game. Despite managing to score 37 goals, 23 assists and 60 points, the Ducks missed the 2012 playoffs after finishing fifth in the Pacific Division and 13th in the Western Conference.

In the lock-out-shortened 2012–13 season, Perry and his teammates got off to a much better start than the previous season, going 7–1–1 in their first nine games. Although his teammates were finding success scoring goals, Perry struggled to find the back of the net, scoring only one goal in his first 12 games. However, as the season progressed, Perry began to find his scoring touch, ultimately finishing the season with 15 goals and 21 assists for 36 points. In a game against the Minnesota Wild, Perry delivered a late hit to the head of forward Jason Zucker. After a review of the hit by NHL executive Rob Blake, Perry was given a four-game suspension. On March 18, 2013, Perry signed an eight-year, $69 million contract extension with the Ducks, ten days after Ryan Getzlaf was signed to a similar eight-year contract. The 2013 playoffs would prove to be a disappointment for Perry, as he failed to score a single goal in the seven game loss to the Detroit Red Wings, despite firing 24 shots on goal.

Perry's 2013–14 season turned out to be one of his best as he had 43 goals, 39 assists and 82 points in 81 games played, helping the Ducks win their second consecutive Pacific Division title and was the runner up for the Rocket Richard Trophy only behind Washington Capitals forward and captain Alexander Ovechkin who ended with a league leading 51 goals. Perry was selected to the first All-Star team for the second time in his career.

Perry was named to his fourth All-Star Game when he was named to the 2016 NHL All-Star Game, along with teammate John Gibson.

Perry's goal production declined during the 2016–17 and 2017–18 seasons, falling from 34 in 2015–16 to 19 and 17 respectively.

On September 26, 2018, Perry was ruled out for five months after undergoing surgery for a torn meniscus and an medial collateral ligament (MCL) injury. He made his 2018–19 season debut on February 2, 2019, in a 9–3 loss to the Winnipeg Jets and eventually finished the season contributing with six goals and four assists for 10 points in 31 games as the Ducks failed to qualify for the playoffs for the first time since 2012.

On June 19, 2019, Perry's 14-year tenure with the Ducks ended after he was bought-out from the remaining two years of his eight-year contract to become an unrestricted free agent. The buyout was prompted by his knee surgery and perceived declining utility, though longtime teammate Ryan Getzlaf would later remark that it had also served to free him from expectations, saying "when you have him as a $9 million player as opposed to a million and a half player, there's a lot different expectations. It allows a player to go and be just himself and not be judged on everything else, like his cap number."

==== Dallas Stars (2019–2020) ====
On July 1, 2019, Perry signed on the opening day of free agency to a bonus-laden one-year, $1.5 million contract with the Dallas Stars. On November 13, he played his 1,000th career regular season NHL game against the Calgary Flames. He became the 340th player in NHL history to hit the milestone. During the 2020 Bridgestone NHL Winter Classic on January 1, 2020, Perry was issued a game misconduct for elbowing Nashville Predators defenceman Ryan Ellis at 2:40 of the first period. He was subsequently suspended for five games on January 3, and forfeited $40,322.60. Perry had five goals and 16 assists in 57 games before the 2019–20 regular season was prematurely ended by the onset of the COVID-19 pandemic.

The Stars were on a six-game losing streak when the season ended, but when the NHL later scheduled the 2020 playoffs to take place in late summer in a bubble environment in Edmonton, things proved to be different. Playing the Calgary Flames in the first round, Perry was credited with a pivotal role in the team's victory in game two after losing the opening game, including an assist on Jamie Oleksiak's game-winning goal. He went on to contribute to the team's second round win over the Colorado Avalanche, and provided the screen for Denis Gurianov's Western Conference final-clinching goal against the Vegas Golden Knights. The Stars reached the 2020 Stanley Cup Final, playing against the Tampa Bay Lightning. Perry's most notable feat came in game five of the series when he scored the overtime-winner on Lightning goaltender Andrei Vasilevskiy to stave off elimination and force a sixth game. The Stars were ultimately defeated in game six and the Lightning won the series and the Stanley Cup, four games to two.

Despite his strong postseason performance, the Stars opted not to re-sign Perry.

==== Montreal Canadiens (2020–2021) ====
On December 28, 2020, Perry extended his career by signing as a free agent to a one-year, $750,000 contract with the Montreal Canadiens. Due to the ongoing pandemic, the NHL temporarily realigned all of its divisions and, to minimize travel, all teams played only within those divisions for the 2020–21 regular season and shortened the regular season from 82 games to 56 games. The Canadiens were part of the all-Canadian North Division. On January 11, 2021, Perry was waived by the Canadiens for the purpose of putting him on the team's taxi squad. Despite starting the season on the taxi squad, Perry had a strong showing during the shortened season, finishing ninth in team scoring with 21 points (nine goals, 12 assists) in 49 games.

The Canadiens qualified for the fourth berth in the North Division in the 2021 playoffs, entering a first round matchup with the Toronto Maple Leafs as decided underdogs. However, for the second year in a row, Perry's team would go on a surprisingly deep run in the postseason, ousting the Leafs in seven games before sweeping the Winnipeg Jets in the second round and then beating the Vegas Golden Knights in six games in the Conference Final. In game one against the Leafs, Perry attempted to jump over Leafs captain John Tavares who had earlier been knocked to the ice, however, Perry's knee clipped Tavares in the head. Tavares suffered a concussion and had to be stretchered off, and did not return for the rest of the series. After the game, Perry felt remorse for his role on the incident: "I don't know what else to do there. I tried to jump. I know Johnny pretty well and just hope he’s OK." On reaching the 2021 Stanley Cup Final, his second consecutive with two different clubs and third overall appearance, Perry reflected that "you come into this League at a young age, and you have success early. I went to the conference final my first year, and then we ended up winning my second year. You think it's going to happen over and over and over again. You just keep the same team together and just ride the wave, but that's not the case." Perry faced the Tampa Bay Lightning in the Final for the second consecutive year. The Canadiens were ultimately defeated in five games as the Lightning won their second straight Stanley Cup title. Following the loss in the Stanley Cup Final, Perry expressed a desire to re-sign with the Canadiens. However, general manager Marc Bergevin declined to offer Perry a two-year contract, and he opted to sign elsewhere.

==== Tampa Bay Lightning (2021–2023) ====
On July 29, 2021, Perry, having played in two consecutive Stanley Cup Final losing efforts against the Tampa Bay Lightning, opted to join the back-to-back champions on a two-year, $2 million contract. On the occasion, he said "coming into a team that I've seen firsthand, the last two years. At the end of the day, where I'm at in my career, I want to win. I want to be a part of that and I'm looking forward to it." Shortly after the beginning of the 2021–22 season, he was named an alternate captain. After a 17-game scoring drought at the start of the season, he recorded his first goal with the Lightning on November 23, against the Philadelphia Flyers. On February 23, 2022, Perry scores his 400th NHL goal in a 5–3 win over the Edmonton Oilers. He would go on to score 19 goals in the season (his most since 2016–17 while still with Anaheim) and also 21 assists for 40 points in all 82 games played.

The two time defending Stanley Cup Lightning qualified for the 2022 playoffs as they finished the season as the fifth seed in the Eastern Conference, and for the second consecutive year, Perry faced the Maple Leafs in the first round, again beating them in seven games. The Lightning then swept the Presidents' Trophy-winning Florida Panthers in the second round to reach their third straight Eastern Conference final and sixth conference final in eight seasons. Perry had five goals in the first two rounds, tying Ross Colton for the team lead. His role on the team increased in the course of the playoffs, as injury to Brayden Point in the first round lead to him taking Point's place on the top power play unit alongside Victor Hedman, Ondřej Palát, Nikita Kucherov and captain Steven Stamkos. The Lightning went on to beat the New York Rangers in a six-game series, advancing to the 2022 Stanley Cup Final. Perry became only the second player in the history of the NHL to go to the Final series in three consecutive years with three different teams, after Marian Hossa. After scoring a goal in game three, Perry became the first player in NHL history to score a goal in the Stanley Cup Final with four different teams. Perry went on to lose his third consecutive Stanley Cup Final with a third different team, this time to the Colorado Avalanche, becoming the first player in NHL history to do so.

Perry recorded 12 goals and 13 assists for 25 points in 81 games for the Lightning in the 2022–23 season. He also recorded two goals, three assists and five points in all six playoff games in the Lightning’s first round exit in six games to the Toronto Maple Leafs.

==== Chicago Blackhawks (2023) ====
On June 29, 2023, Tampa Bay traded the negotiation rights for Perry to the Chicago Blackhawks in exchange for a 2024 seventh-round pick. He was promptly signed to a one-year, $4 million contract for the 2023–24 season with the Blackhawks on June 30. On November 25, after he had been a healthy scratch for the Blackhawks' last two games, the team announced Perry would take an indefinite leave of absence for personal reasons. Kyle Davidson, the Blackhawks' general manager, added the decision was made by the team's management. On November 28, the Blackhawks placed Perry on unconditional waivers, stating that an internal investigation revealed that he had "engaged in conduct that is unacceptable, and in violation both of the terms of his Standard Player's Contract and the Blackhawks' internal policies intended to promote professional and safe work environments." After Perry cleared waivers the following day, the Blackhawks terminated his contract.

At a press conference on November 28, Davidson said that the Blackhawks had learned of misconduct on Perry's part while the team was preparing to play against the Columbus Blue Jackets. According to Davidson, when team officials learned this information, they pulled Perry from the lineup and began an internal investigation, which culminated in the decision to cut ties with him. ESPN's Emily Kaplan reported that Perry was believed to have been involved in an incident with a Blackhawks employee. Perry apologized for the incident and said he was seeking professional help for substance abuse.

==== Edmonton Oilers (2024–2025) ====
On January 22, 2024, Perry was signed to a one-year contract by the Edmonton Oilers. On June 2, the Oilers qualified for the Stanley Cup Final, marking Perry's fourth trip to the Final in five years and fifth trip altogether. The Oilers would ultimately lose the series to the Florida Panthers in seven games. After scoring a goal in game three of the Final, he extended his previous NHL record by scoring a goal in the Stanley Cup Final for five different franchises.

On July 1, 2024, Perry re-signed with the Oilers to a one-year, $1.4 million contract. The Oilers returned to the Stanley Cup Final for the second year in a row on May 29, 2025, marking Perry's fifth Stanley Cup Final appearance in six years and sixth overall, which he and the Oilers again lost to the Panthers, this time in six games. His goal in Game 2 to tie the game with 18 seconds remaining in the third period set a record for the latest game-tying goal in Stanley Cup Final history. Perry ended the 2025 playoffs with 10 goals and four assists for 14 points in all 22 games.

==== Los Angeles Kings (2025–2026) ====
On July 1, 2025, as a free agent from the Oilers, Perry signed a one-year, $3.5 million contract with the Los Angeles Kings.

==== Return to Tampa Bay (2026) ====
On March 6, 2026, at the trade deadline, the Lightning re-acquired Perry from the Kings in exchange for a second round draft pick. In the playoffs, Tampa would fall to his former team, the Montreal Canadiens in the first round in seven games, marking only the second time in his past seven seasons where he did not make the Stanley Cup Final.

==== Return to Los Angeles (2026–present) ====
On July 1, 2026, Perry signed a one-year, $1 million contract to return to the Kings.

== International play ==
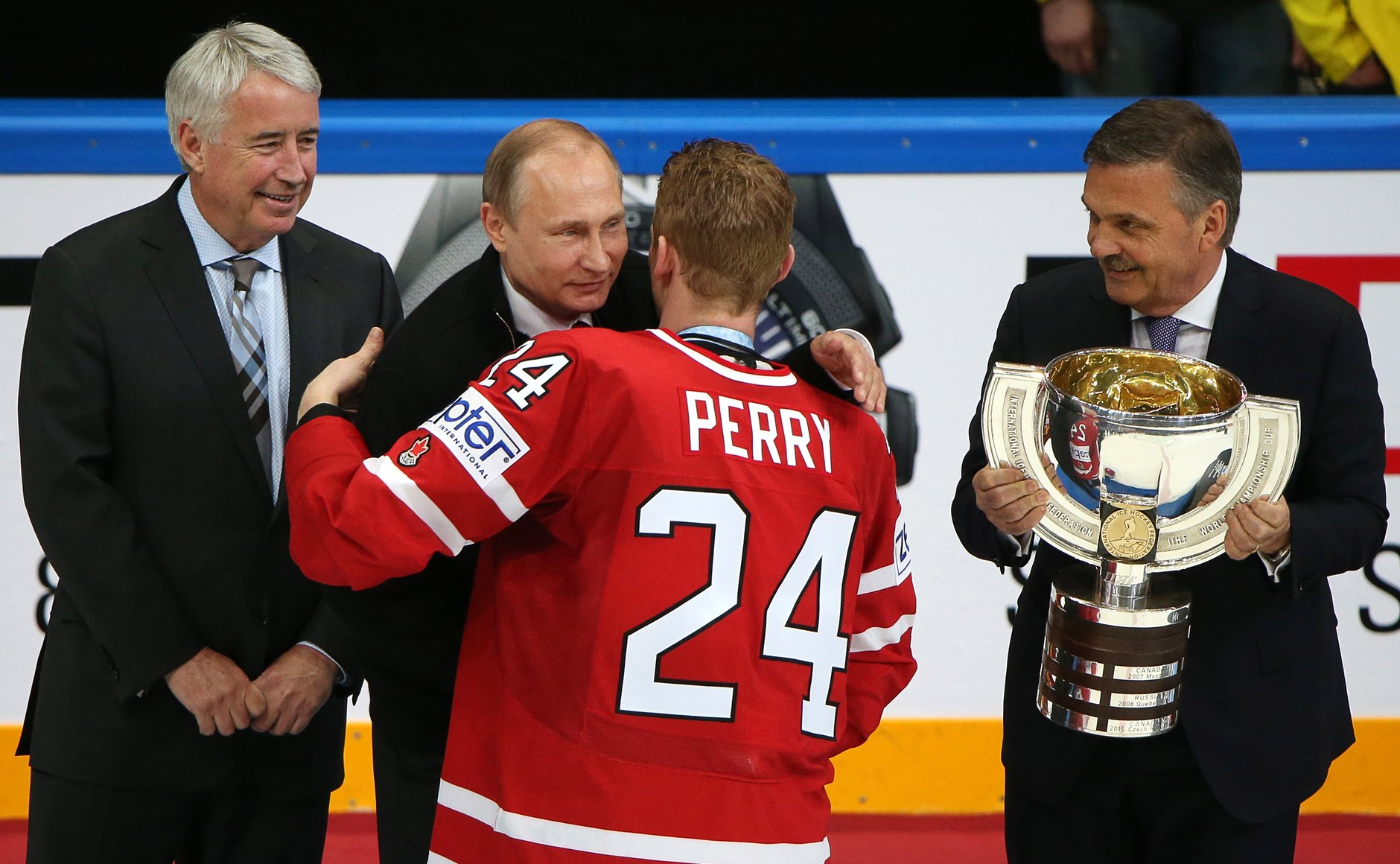
- Perry and President of Russia, Vladimir Putin, after winning the gold medal at the 2016 World Championship

Medal record

Men's ice hockey

Representing Canada

Olympic Games
Gold medal – first place	2010 Vancouver	
Gold medal – first place	2014 Sochi	

World Championships
Gold medal – first place	2016 Russia	

World Cup of Hockey
Gold medal – first place	2016 Toronto	

World Junior Championships
Gold medal – first place	2005 United States	

Perry helped lead the Canada junior team to a gold medal in the 2005 World Junior Championship, playing alongside Sidney Crosby and Patrice Bergeron on the team's first line.

On December 30, 2009, Perry was selected to play for Canada senior team at the 2010 Winter Olympics. On April 16, 2010, Perry was among the first group of 15 players to be named to Canada for participation in the 2010 World Championship.

In Canada's first game of the 2010 Winter Olympics, Perry helped lead the team to an 8–0 victory over Norway, scoring one goal. In the quarterfinals against Russia, he scored two goals in a 7–3 win, and then scored the second goal in the gold medal game against the United States to make the score 2–0 in the second period. Canada went on to win the game 3–2 after an overtime goal by Sidney Crosby.

Perry contributed one assist in Canada's six games en route to a gold medal victory at the 2014 Winter Olympics over Sweden.

At the 2016 World Championship, Perry served as captain en route to a gold medal finish.

== Personal life ==
Perry's younger brother Adam played alongside him on the London Knights' 2005 Memorial Cup-winning team. Adam was the assistant coach of the London Nationals Junior B Team; he is currently in law enforcement, like their father. Perry lives in southern California, and in London, Ontario during the off-season. Perry and his wife were married in July 2015.

== Career statistics ==
=== Regular season and playoffs ===
Bold indicates led league

			Regular season					Playoffs
Season	Team	League	GP	G	A	Pts	PIM	GP	G	A	Pts	PIM
2000–01	Peterborough Bees	OPJHL	2	1	0	1	0	—	—	—	—	—
2001–02	London Knights	OHL	60	28	31	59	56	12	2	3	5	30
2002–03	London Knights	OHL	67	25	53	78	147	14	7	16	23	27
2003–04	London Knights	OHL	66	40	73	113	98	15	7	15	22	20
2003–04	Cincinnati Mighty Ducks	AHL	—	—	—	—	—	3	1	1	2	4
2004–05	London Knights	OHL	60	**47**	**83**	**130**	117	18	11	**27**	**38**	46
2005–06	Portland Pirates	AHL	19	16	18	34	32	—	—	—	—	—
2005–06	Mighty Ducks of Anaheim	NHL	56	13	12	25	50	11	0	3	3	16
2006–07	Anaheim Ducks	NHL	82	17	27	44	55	21	6	9	15	37
2007–08	Anaheim Ducks	NHL	70	29	25	54	108	3	2	1	3	8
2008–09	Anaheim Ducks	NHL	78	32	40	72	109	13	8	6	14	36
2009–10	Anaheim Ducks	NHL	82	27	49	76	111	—	—	—	—	—
2010–11	Anaheim Ducks	NHL	82	**50**	48	98	104	6	2	6	8	4
2011–12	Anaheim Ducks	NHL	80	37	23	60	127	—	—	—	—	—
2012–13	Anaheim Ducks	NHL	44	15	21	36	72	7	0	2	2	4
2013–14	Anaheim Ducks	NHL	81	43	39	82	65	13	4	7	11	19
2014–15	Anaheim Ducks	NHL	67	33	22	55	67	16	10	8	18	14
2015–16	Anaheim Ducks	NHL	82	34	28	62	68	7	0	4	4	6
2016–17	Anaheim Ducks	NHL	**82**	19	34	53	76	17	4	7	11	34
2017–18	Anaheim Ducks	NHL	71	17	32	49	71	4	0	0	0	8
2018–19	Anaheim Ducks	NHL	31	6	4	10	27	—	—	—	—	—
2019–20	Dallas Stars	NHL	57	5	16	21	70	27	5	4	9	27
2020–21	Montreal Canadiens	NHL	49	9	12	21	39	22	4	6	10	25
2021–22	Tampa Bay Lightning	NHL	**82**	19	21	40	66	23	6	5	11	26
2022–23	Tampa Bay Lightning	NHL	81	12	13	25	95	6	2	3	5	7
2023–24	Chicago Blackhawks	NHL	16	4	5	9	12	—	—	—	—	—
2023–24	Edmonton Oilers	NHL	38	8	5	13	34	19	1	2	3	12
2024–25	Edmonton Oilers	NHL	81	19	11	30	61	22	10	4	14	12
2025–26	Los Angeles Kings	NHL	50	11	17	28	59	—	—	—	—	—
2025–26	Tampa Bay Lightning	NHL	22	6	3	9	22	7	0	0	0	4
NHL totals			1,464	465	507	972	1,568	244	64	77	141	299

=== International ===
Year	Team	Event	GP	G	A	Pts	PIM
2002	Canada Ontario	U17	6	3	5	8	8
2002	Canada	WJC18	5	1	1	2	4
2005	Canada	WJC	6	2	5	7	6
2010	Canada	OLY	7	4	1	5	2
2010	Canada	WC	7	2	4	6	2
2012	Canada	WC	8	3	4	7	8
2014	Canada	OLY	6	0	1	1	2
2016	Canada	WC	10	4	5	9	6
2016	Canada	WCH	6	2	0	2	3
Junior totals			17	6	11	17	18
Senior totals			44	15	15	30	23

== Awards, honours, and records ==
Award	Year
NHL
Stanley Cup champion	2007
NHL All-Star Game	2008, 2011, 2012, 2016
NHL First All-Star Team	2011, 2014
Hart Memorial Trophy	2011
Maurice "Rocket" Richard Trophy	2011
OHL
First All-Rookie Team	2002
CHL/NHL Top Prospects Game	2003
First All-Star team	2004, 2005
CHL second All-Star team	2004
Jim Mahon Memorial Trophy	2005
Eddie Powers Memorial Trophy	2005
Red Tilson Trophy	2005
Wayne Gretzky 99 Award	2005
J. Ross Robertson Cup champion	2005
Memorial Cup champion	2005
Stafford Smythe Memorial Trophy	2005
Memorial Cup All-Star team	2005

=== Records ===
==== NHL ====
- First player to reach the Stanley Cup Final with 5 different franchises (Anaheim Ducks, Dallas Stars, Montreal Canadiens, Tampa Bay Lightning, Edmonton Oilers)

==== Anaheim Ducks ====
- Most career shootout goals (33)
- Most career shootout-deciding goals (14)
- Most career penalty minutes (1,110)
- Most consecutive 20-goal seasons (5, tied with Paul Kariya and Teemu Selanne)
- Longest assist streak (10 games, in 2009-10, tied with Ryan Getzlaf)
- Longest point streak (19 games, in 2009-10)
- Most shorthanded goals in a season (4, in 2010-11, tied with Isac Lundeström)
- Most game winning goals in a season (11, in 2010-11)
- Most goals in a playoff year (10, in 2014-15, tied with Andy McDonald)

Awards and achievements
Preceded by Ryan Getzlaf	Anaheim Ducks first-round draft pick 2003	Succeeded by Ladislav Šmíd
Preceded by Henrik Sedin	Hart Memorial Trophy winner 2011	Succeeded by Evgeni Malkin
Preceded by Sidney Crosby, Steven Stamkos	Maurice "Rocket" Richard Trophy winner 2011	Succeeded by Steven Stamkos
