= Drew Larman =

American ice hockey player (born 1985)

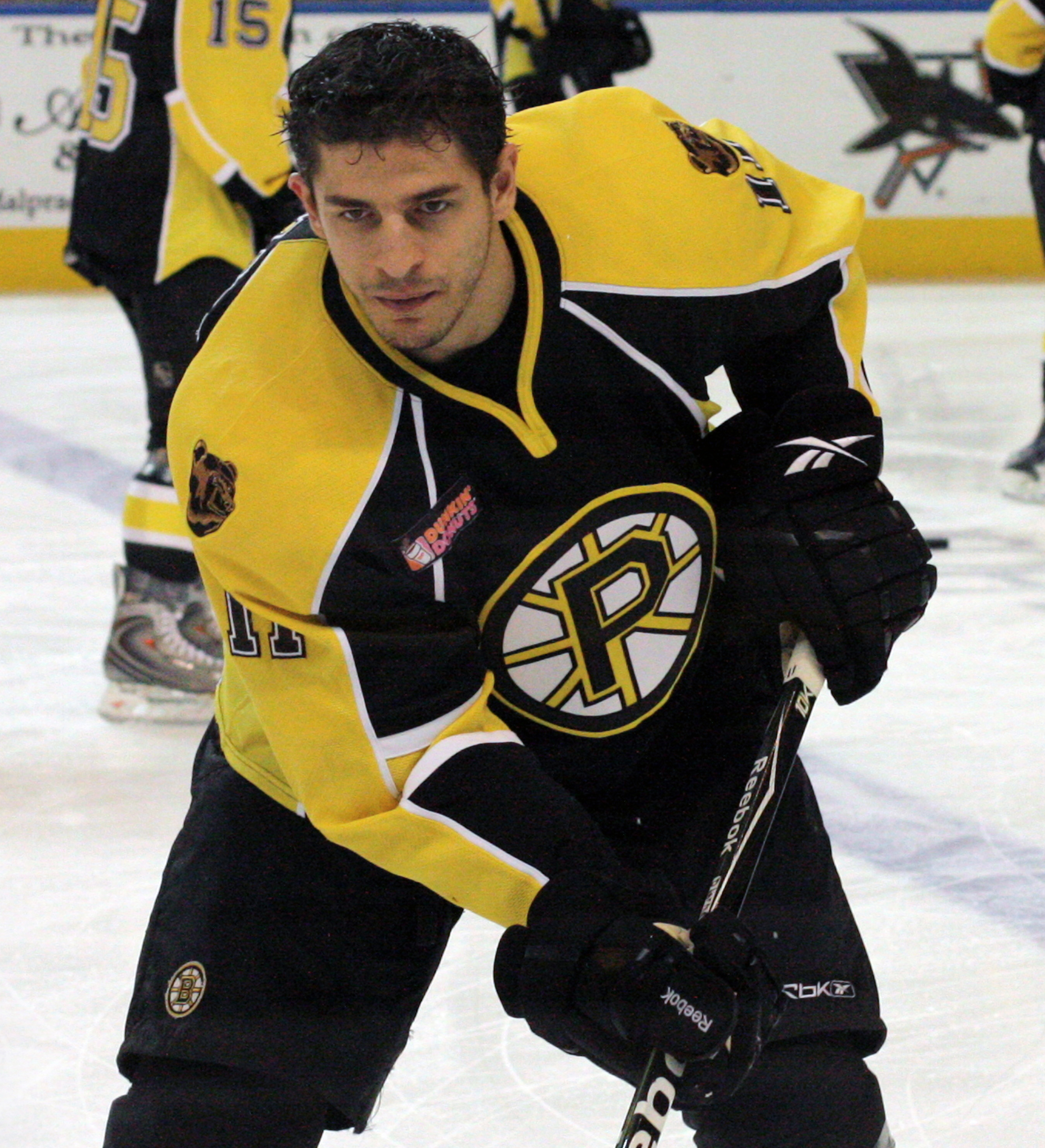
- Larman as a member of the Providence Bruins
- Born: May 15, 1985 (age 40) Canton, Michigan, U.S.
- Height: 6 ft 3 in (191 cm)
- Weight: 180 lb (82 kg; 12 st 12 lb)
- Position: Center
- Shot: Right
- Played for: Florida Panthers; Boston Bruins
- NHL draft: Undrafted
- Playing career: 2005–2011

Drew Robert Larman (born May 15, 1985) is an American former professional ice hockey player who played 26 games for the Florida Panthers and Boston Bruins of the National Hockey League (NHL).

== Playing career ==
As a youth, Larman played in the 1999 Quebec International Pee-Wee Hockey Tournament with the Detroit Honeybaked minor ice hockey team.

Undrafted, Larman played in the OHL with the Sarnia Sting and the Memorial Cup Championship team, the 2005 London Knights.

On September 25, 2005, Larman was signed by the Florida Panthers as a free agent. Drew made his professional debut with the Panthers affiliates, the Florida Everblades of the ECHL and the Rochester Americans of the AHL, in the 2005-06 season.

Larman made his NHL debut the following 2006-07 season with the Panthers, playing in 16 games. Drew then spent the next two seasons playing primarily for Rochester.

On July 13, 2009, Larman signed a one-year contract with the Boston Bruins. He was assigned to start the 2009–10 season, in the AHL with affiliate the Providence Bruins. In a checking-line role, Larman added 6 goals and 12 points in 55 games with Providence, while also featuring in 4 scoreless games in a recall to the Boston Bruins.

As a free agent and with little NHL interest, Larman belatedly signed a one-year contract in the ECHL with his first professional club, the Florida Everblades on November 11, 2010. Larman played in 57 games with the Everblades, adding little offense with 11 points to draw a close to his professional playing career at the conclusion of the 2010–11 season.

== After hockey ==
As of 2016, Drew Larman was working as a yoga instructor in Fort Myers, Florida.

== Career statistics ==
			Regular season					Playoffs
Season	Team	League	GP	G	A	Pts	PIM	GP	G	A	Pts	PIM
2002–03	Sarnia Sting	OHL	67	4	14	18	25	—	—	—	—	—
2003–04	Sarnia Sting	OHL	68	9	18	27	13	5	0	1	1	0
2004–05	Sarnia Sting	OHL	12	2	0	2	6	—	—	—	—	—
2004–05	London Knights	OHL	58	11	10	21	28	18	3	4	7	8
2005–06	Florida Everblades	ECHL	6	0	0	0	4	8	4	2	6	4
2005–06	Rochester Americans	AHL	44	7	8	15	24	—	—	—	—	—
2006–07	Rochester Americans	AHL	54	17	11	28	35	—	—	—	—	—
2006–07	Florida Panthers	NHL	16	2	0	2	2	—	—	—	—	—
2007–08	Rochester Americans	AHL	54	10	12	22	44	—	—	—	—	—
2007–08	Florida Panthers	NHL	6	0	1	1	2	—	—	—	—	—
2008–09	Rochester Americans	AHL	61	10	13	23	40	—	—	—	—	—
2009–10	Providence Bruins	AHL	55	6	6	12	26	—	—	—	—	—
2009–10	Boston Bruins	NHL	4	0	0	0	0	—	—	—	—	—
2010–11	Florida Everblades	ECHL	57	3	8	11	30	4	0	2	2	2
NHL totals			26	2	1	3	4	—	—	—	—	—
