= Jamie McGinn =

Canadian ice hockey player (born 1988)

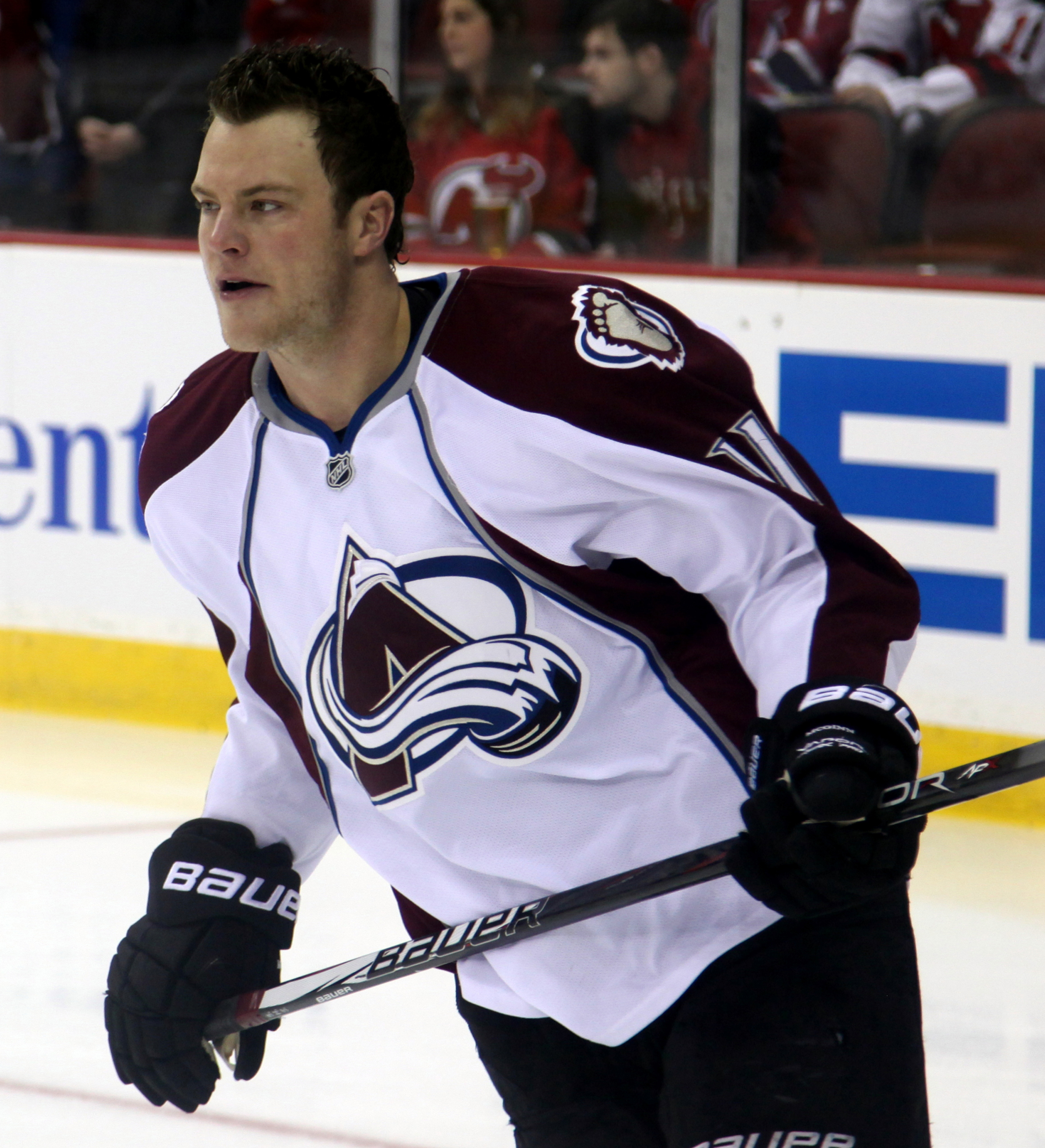
- McGinn with the Colorado Avalanche in 2014
- Born: August 5, 1988 (age 37) Fergus, Ontario, Canada
- Height: 6 ft 1 in (185 cm)
- Weight: 205 lb (93 kg; 14 st 9 lb)
- Position: Left wing
- Shot: Left
- Played for: San Jose Sharks; Colorado Avalanche; Buffalo Sabres; Anaheim Ducks; Arizona Coyotes; Florida Panthers
- NHL draft: 36th overall, 2006; San Jose Sharks
- Playing career: 2007–2019

James Robert McGinn IV (born August 5, 1988) is a Canadian former professional ice hockey forward who played in the National Hockey League (NHL). He was selected in the second round, 36th overall, by the San Jose Sharks of the 2006 NHL entry draft. He skated in over 600 NHL games.

== Playing career ==
=== Junior ===
McGinn was selected in the third round, 50th overall by the Ottawa 67's in the 2004 OHL Priority Selection. After two seasons with the team, McGinn was selected in the second round, 36th overall by the San Jose Sharks in the 2006 NHL entry draft. He spent the entirety of his major junior career with the 67's, with his best season coming during the 2006–07 season, in which he led the team with 46 goals and 89 points.

=== Professional ===
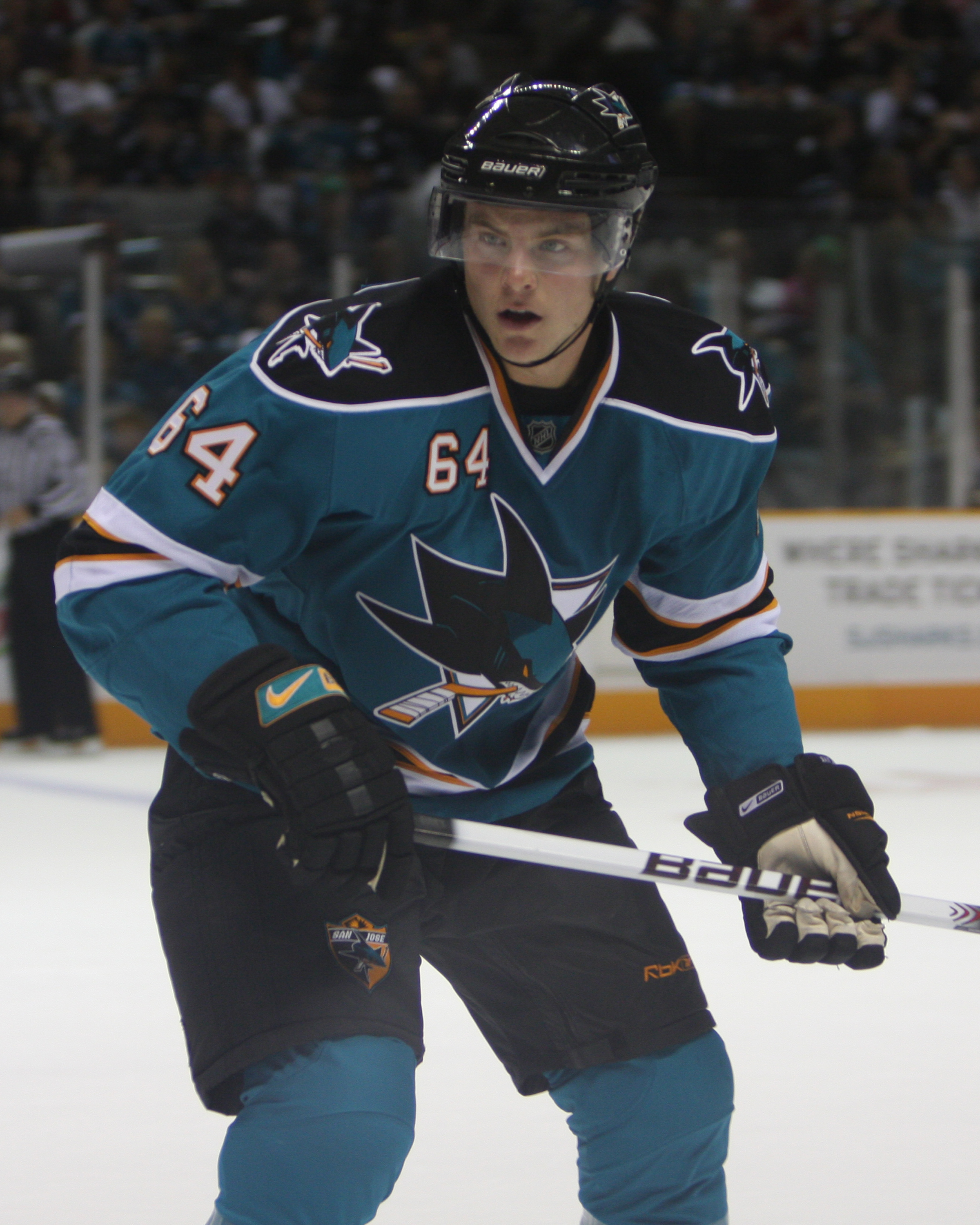
McGinn during his tenure with the Sharks in 2009.

==== San Jose Sharks ====
After his 2006–07 OHL season, McGinn was signed to an entry-level deal by the Sharks. He appeared in four regular season games and six playoff games for their American Hockey League affiliate, the Worcester Sharks.

McGinn made his National Hockey League (NHL) debut on October 28, 2008, against the Pittsburgh Penguins. He scored his first NHL goal on October 30, 2008, against the Detroit Red Wings in only his second career NHL game.

On June 30, 2011, McGinn re-signed to a one-year, $680,000 contract with the Sharks. In the 2011–12 season, McGinn enjoyed a break-out season scoring 12 goals and 24 points in 61 games.

==== Colorado Avalanche ====
In the midst of his break-out season, McGinn was traded at the trade deadline on February 27, 2012, to the Colorado Avalanche, along with prospects Mike Connolly and Michael Sgarbossa in exchange for TJ Galiardi, Daniel Winnik and a seventh round selection. As a restricted free agent, McGinn filed for arbitration in the summer of 2012, but on July 13 McGinn signed a two-year, $3.5 million contract with the Avalanche.

On June 19, 2014, McGinn agreed to another two-year contract extension with the Avalanche. McGinn would miss the Avalanche's entire training camp and pre-season for the 2014–15 season, due to his recurrent back injury. He was able to return to the team to begin the season, however after 19 games McGinn was ruled out for the remainder of the season to undergo back surgery after re-injuring his troublesome back in game against the New Jersey Devils on November 15, 2014.

==== Buffalo Sabres ====
At the 2015 NHL entry draft, the Avalanche traded McGinn, alongside Ryan O'Reilly, to the Buffalo Sabres in exchange for prospect J. T. Compher, Mikhail Grigorenko, Nikita Zadorov and the 31st pick in the draft on June 26, 2015. McGinn successfully returned from back surgery, and recorded 14 goals and 27 points in 63 games.

==== Anaheim Ducks ====
On February 29, 2016, McGinn was traded to the Anaheim Ducks in exchange for a conditional 3rd-round pick. McGinn ended the season with 12 points in 21 games for the Ducks.

==== Arizona Coyotes ====
On July 1, 2016, it was announced that McGinn had signed as a free agent to a three-year contract with the Arizona Coyotes. In his lone season with the club, McGinn recorded 9 goals and 17 points in 72 games.

==== Florida Panthers ====
On September 17, 2017, McGinn was traded by the Coyotes during training camp for the 2017–18 season to the Florida Panthers in exchange for Jason Demers. McGinn established himself amongst the Panthers third-line, increasing his offensive output from his tenure with the Coyotes in registering 13 goals and 29 points in 76 games as the Panthers missed the post-season.

Approaching the final year of his contract, McGinn missed training camp after undergoing back surgery, placing him indefinitely on the injured non-roster to begin the 2018–19 season. Nearing a return after four months of rehabilitation, McGinn was placed on waivers by the Panthers on January 31, 2018. Having cleared waivers, McGinn was activated off injured reserve and assigned to continue his recovery with AHL affiliate, the Springfield Thunderbirds, on February 1, 2019.

==== Later years ====
As a free agent from the Panthers, McGinn continued his recovery from his back injury over the summer. Unsigned leading into the 2019–20 season, McGinn belatedly signed a professional tryout contract with the Charlotte Checkers of the AHL on October 22, 2019. An affiliate to the Carolina Hurricanes organization, he joined with the goal to potentially play with younger brother and current Hurricane, Brock. McGinn made two appearances with the Checkers before he was released from his PTO on October 31, 2019.

On November 11, 2019, McGinn (alongside former Panthers' teammate Troy Brouwer) was signed to a professional tryout by the St. Louis Blues. After travelling and training with the Blues, McGinn was released from his tryout on November 20, 2019.

== Personal life ==
His younger brothers, Tye and Brock are also ice hockey players. Tye was selected 119th overall by the Philadelphia Flyers in the 2010 NHL entry draft and played professionally in the NHL, AHL and German professional league; and Brock was selected 47th overall by the Carolina Hurricanes in the 2012 NHL entry draft and, as of 2024, plays for the Anaheim Ducks. Along with his father, Bob McGinn, and his two brothers, he is one of the owners of the Roanoke Rail Yard Dawgs of the Southern Professional Hockey League.

McGinn suffers from a genetic back problem that plagued him extensively during his pre-pro career. Cortisone, rehab, and major surgery in the summer of 2008 helped alleviate the pain, though the lingering effects still plague McGinn, especially due to his high-pace playing style.

== Career statistics ==
=== Regular season and playoffs ===
| | | | Regular season | | | | | Playoffs |
| Season | Team | League | GP | G | A | Pts | PIM | GP | G | A | Pts | PIM |
|---|---|---|---|---|---|---|---|---|---|---|---|---|
| 2004–05 | Ottawa 67's | OHL | 59 | 10 | 12 | 22 | 35 | 18 | 4 | 7 | 11 | 0 |
| 2005–06 | Ottawa 67's | OHL | 65 | 26 | 31 | 57 | 113 | 6 | 2 | 2 | 4 | 4 |
| 2006–07 | Ottawa 67's | OHL | 68 | 46 | 43 | 89 | 49 | 5 | 5 | 1 | 6 | 2 |
| 2006–07 | Worcester Sharks | AHL | 4 | 1 | 1 | 2 | 4 | 6 | 0 | 0 | 0 | 8 |
| 2007–08 | Ottawa 67's | OHL | 51 | 29 | 29 | 58 | 54 | 4 | 2 | 2 | 4 | 4 |
| 2007–08 | Worcester Sharks | AHL | 8 | 0 | 2 | 2 | 0 | — | — | — | — | — |
| 2008–09 | Worcester Sharks | AHL | 47 | 19 | 11 | 30 | 52 | 6 | 4 | 0 | 0 | 19 |
| 2008–09 | San Jose Sharks | NHL | 35 | 4 | 2 | 6 | 2 | — | — | — | — | — |
| 2009–10 | San Jose Sharks | NHL | 59 | 10 | 3 | 13 | 38 | 15 | 0 | 0 | 0 | 8 |
| 2009–10 | Worcester Sharks | AHL | 27 | 7 | 14 | 21 | 15 | — | — | — | — | — |
| 2010–11 | San Jose Sharks | NHL | 49 | 1 | 5 | 6 | 33 | 7 | 0 | 1 | 1 | 30 |
| 2010–11 | Worcester Sharks | AHL | 30 | 9 | 11 | 20 | 27 | — | — | — | — | — |
| 2011–12 | San Jose Sharks | NHL | 61 | 12 | 12 | 24 | 26 | — | — | — | — | — |
| 2011–12 | Colorado Avalanche | NHL | 17 | 8 | 5 | 13 | 11 | — | — | — | — | — |
| 2012–13 | Colorado Avalanche | NHL | 47 | 11 | 11 | 22 | 26 | — | — | — | — | — |
| 2013–14 | Colorado Avalanche | NHL | 79 | 19 | 19 | 38 | 30 | 7 | 2 | 3 | 5 | 2 |
| 2014–15 | Colorado Avalanche | NHL | 19 | 4 | 2 | 6 | 6 | — | — | — | — | — |
| 2015–16 | Buffalo Sabres | NHL | 63 | 14 | 13 | 27 | 10 | — | — | — | — | — |
| 2015–16 | Anaheim Ducks | NHL | 21 | 8 | 4 | 12 | 23 | 7 | 2 | 0 | 2 | 2 |
| 2016–17 | Arizona Coyotes | NHL | 72 | 9 | 8 | 17 | 23 | — | — | — | — | — |
| 2017–18 | Florida Panthers | NHL | 76 | 13 | 16 | 29 | 33 | — | — | — | — | — |
| 2018–19 | Springfield Thunderbirds | AHL | 4 | 2 | 2 | 4 | 9 | — | — | — | — | — |
| 2018–19 | Florida Panthers | NHL | 19 | 4 | 3 | 7 | 6 | — | — | — | — | — |
| 2019–20 | Charlotte Checkers | AHL | 2 | 0 | 0 | 0 | 15 | — | — | — | — | — |
| NHL totals | | | 617 | 117 | 103 | 220 | 267 | 36 | 4 | 4 | 8 | 42 |

=== International ===
| Year | Team | Event | GP | G | A | Pts | PIM |
|---|---|---|---|---|---|---|---|
| 2005 | Canada Ontario | U17 | 6 | 1 | 3 | 4 | 0 |
| 2005 | Canada | U18 | 5 | 0 | 0 | 0 | 12 |
| 2006 | Canada | WJC18 | 7 | 2 | 1 | 3 | 10 |
| Junior totals | | | 18 | 3 | 4 | 7 | 22 |
