= Dany Roussin =

Canadian ice hockey player

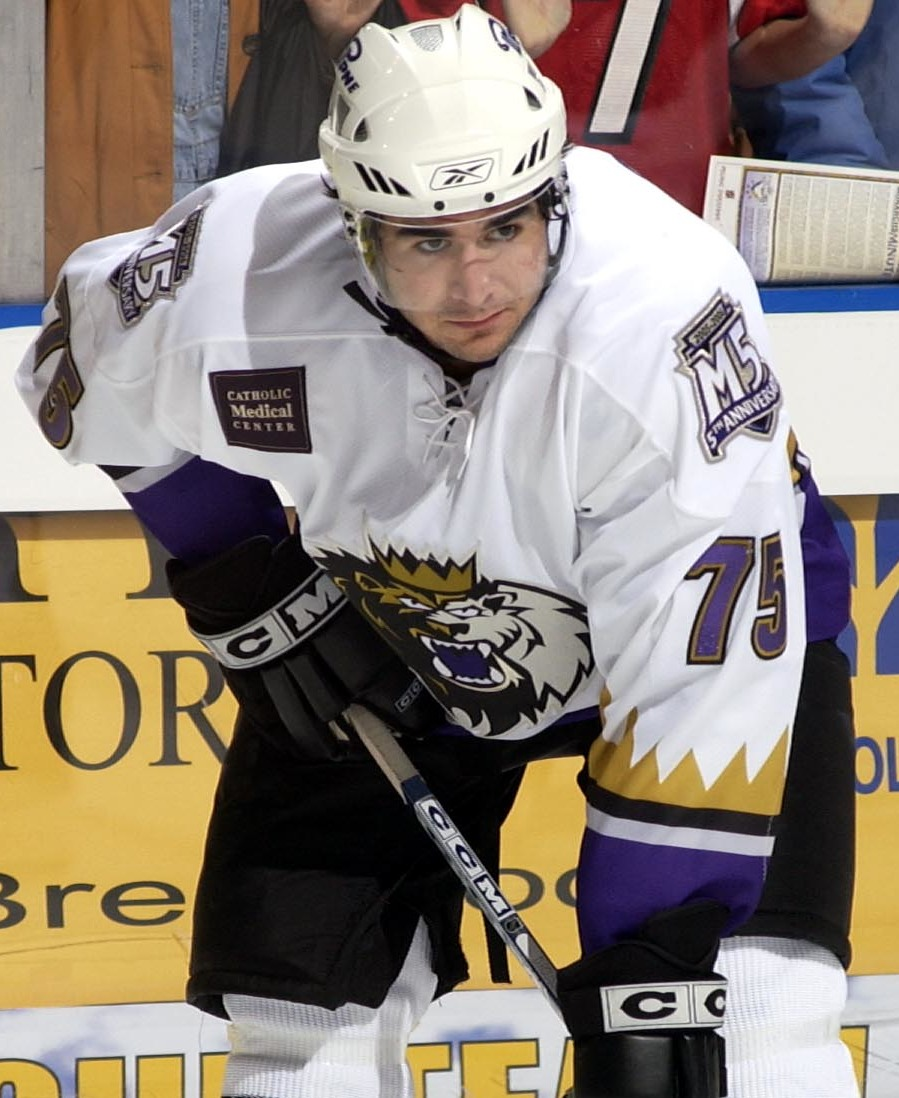
- Roussin with the Manchester Monarchs during the 2005-06 season
- Born: January 9, 1985 (age 41) Quebec City, Quebec, Canada
- Height: 6 ft 2 in (188 cm)
- Weight: 200 lb (91 kg; 14 st 4 lb)
- Position: Centre
- Shot: Left
- Played for: Manchester Monarchs; Reading Royals; Bakersfield Condors; HC Briançon; Saint-Georges Cool FM 103.5; Jonquière Marquis
- NHL draft: 223rd overall, 2003; Florida Panthers; 50th overall, 2005; Los Angeles Kings
- Playing career: 2005–2015

Dany Roussin (born January 9, 1985) is a Canadian former professional ice hockey centre who last played for Jonquière Marquis of the LNAH.

== Playing career ==
=== Junior ===
Dany was taken in the first round (5th overall) of the QMJHL Entry Draft by the Sherbrooke Beavers. After two seasons with the Beavers, where he was stuck playing in a defensive role for Sherbrooke, Roussin was traded to the Rimouski Océanic. It was with Rimouski where Roussin would start producing offensively. He would finish the 2003 with a point per game average, scoring 38 points in 38 games. That would be enough for Roussin to get noticed by the Florida Panthers, who chose to draft Roussin in the 7th round with the 223rd pick of the NHL Entry Draft. The following year, he finished the season leading the QMJHL with 59 goals in 64 games and finishing second to teammate Sidney Crosby in points. In the 2004-05 season, Roussin would put up similar numbers. He would finish 2nd in scoring that season, beating teammate and future Edmonton Oilers 1st round pick Marc-Antoine Pouliot by two points, but finished 52 points behind Sidney Crosby. Rimouski finished 1-2-3 in scoring that season. This season improved Roussin's draft status, where the Los Angeles Kings drafted Roussin in the 2nd round of the 2005 NHL Entry Draft with the 50th pick.

=== Professional ===
On August 16, 2005, Roussin signed a three-year entry-level contract with the Los Angeles Kings. Roussin spent most of three seasons shuffling between Los Angeles' ECHL affiliate, the Reading Royals and their American Hockey League affiliate in the Manchester Monarchs.

On July 1, 2008, Roussin was not qualified a tendered offer by the Los Angeles Kings, therefore making him a free agent. Roussin did not receive an offer from any teams during the off season, so he considered going to Europe until he received a call from the Bakersfield Condors. Roussin started the season in training camp with the Milwaukee Admirals. After 5 games, where Roussin scored 3 points, Roussin left Bakersfield for France.

On November 8, 2008 Dany Roussin signed with HC Briançon of Ligue Magnus. He finished the season with 13 goals and 29 points in only 16 games.

Roussin returned to North America in 2009 and signed with Saint-Georges COOL-FM of the LNAH. In his first season with the team, Roussin scored 52 points in 42 games and was voted LNAH Rookie Of The Year by the league. In the midst of his fifth season with Saint-Georges, Roussin opted to extend his LNAH career with a trade to Jonquière Marquis on January 8, 2014. The 2014-15 season would be his last in professional hockey.

== Career statistics ==
=== Regular season and playoffs ===
			Regular season					Playoffs
Season	Team	League	GP	G	A	Pts	PIM	GP	G	A	Pts	PIM
2000–01	Sainte–Foy Gouverneurs	QMAAA	38	27	27	54	42	—	—	—	—	—
2001–02	Sherbrooke Castors	QMJHL	66	10	14	24	38	—	—	—	—	—
2002–03	Sherbrooke Castors	QMJHL	33	8	8	16	18	—	—	—	—	—
2002–03	Rimouski Océanic	QMJHL	38	12	26	38	69	—	—	—	—	—
2003–04	Rimouski Océanic	QMJHL	66	59	58	117	70	9	2	10	12	12
2004–05	Rimouski Océanic	QMJHL	69	54	62	116	66	13	11	9	20	8
2005–06	Manchester Monarchs	AHL	29	4	2	6	24	3	1	1	2	0
2005–06	Reading Royals	ECHL	41	22	23	45	14	1	0	1	1	0
2006–07	Manchester Monarchs	AHL	15	4	2	6	9	—	—	—	—	—
2007–08	Reading Royals	ECHL	65	23	34	57	36	13	6	4	10	10
2008–09	Bakersfield Condors	ECHL	5	0	3	3	2	—	—	—	—	—
2008–09	Diables Rouges de Briançon	FRA	16	13	16	29	14	12	5	3	8	10
2009–10	Saint–Georges CRS Express	LNAH	43	30	22	52	28	18	12	12	24	12
2010–11	Saint–Georges Cool FM 103.5	LNAH	41	25	15	40	52	9	1	4	5	10
2011–12	Saint–Georges Cool FM 103.5	LNAH	48	17	28	45	50	—	—	—	—	—
2012–13	Saint–Georges Cool FM 103.5	LNAH	40	24	23	47	19	4	2	0	2	4
2013–14	Saint–Georges Cool FM 103.5	LNAH	24	9	10	19	14	—	—	—	—	—
2013–14	Jonquière Marquis	LNAH	17	3	5	8	14	16	3	4	7	14
2014–15	Jonquière Marquis	LNAH	20	8	9	17	12	—	—	—	—	—
AHL totals			44	8	4	12	33	3	1	1	2	0
ECHL totals			111	45	60	105	52	14	6	5	11	10
LNAH totals			233	116	112	228	189	47	18	20	38	40

=== International ===
Year	Team	Event	GP	G	A	Pts	PIM
2003	Canada	WJC18	7	0	1	1	16
Junior totals			7	0	1	1	16
