= Brad Staubitz =

Canadian ice hockey player

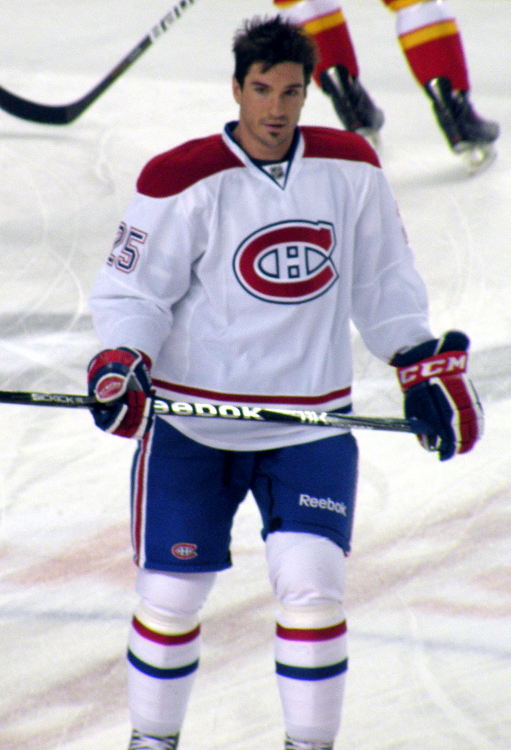
- Born: July 28, 1984 (age 42) Edmonton, Alberta, Canada
- Height: 6 ft 1 in (185 cm)
- Weight: 224 lb (102 kg; 16 st 0 lb)
- Position: Right wing
- Shot: Right
- Played for: San Jose Sharks; Minnesota Wild; Montreal Canadiens; Anaheim Ducks; EV Landshut
- NHL draft: Undrafted
- Playing career: 2005–2015

Bradley Michael Staubitz (born July 28, 1984) is a former Canadian ice hockey forward who is currently an assistant coach for the Sarnia Sting in the Ontario Hockey League.

== Playing career ==
Staubitz was born in Edmonton, Alberta, and raised in Sarnia, Ontario. He played his junior career as a defenceman and was converted to the wing at the pro level.

Undrafted, Staubitz signed as a free agent with the San Jose Sharks to a three-year entry-level contract on September 18, 2005. Staubitz made his NHL debut for the Sharks during the 2008–09 season and recorded a fighting major on his first career shift against the Anaheim Ducks on October 17, 2008. On February 18, 2009, Staubitz was recalled from the AHL's Worcester Sharks.

He played in 47 games for San Jose in 2009–10 recording a career-high 6 points. On June 21, 2010 he was traded to the Minnesota Wild for a fifth-round pick in the 2010 NHL entry draft. He was then signed to a two-year contract by the Wild on June 22.

On September 24, 2011, Staubitz was suspended for 7 games (4 preseasons, 3 regular) by the NHL for illegally checking Cody Bass from behind during a pre-season game.

Staubitz was put on waivers on February 10, 2012. He cleared waivers the next day and was assigned to the Houston Aeros of the American Hockey League, the Wild's minor league affiliate. On February 27, 2012, the Montreal Canadiens claimed Staubitz off re-entry waivers.

On July 1, 2012, he signed a two-year contract with the Anaheim Ducks.

On November 16, 2013, Staubitz was traded by the Ducks along with Peter Holland to the Toronto Maple Leafs in exchange for Jesse Blacker and two 2014 NHL entry draft picks. He was immediately reassigned to their minor league team, the Toronto Marlies of the American Hockey League.

As a free agent into the 2014–15 season, Staubitz with limited North American interest, opted to sign his first European contract with German DEL2 club, EV Landshut on October 22, 2014. At the conclusion of the season he opted to retire and coach for the Sarnia Sting of the Ontario Hockey League.

== Career statistics ==
			Regular season					Playoffs
Season	Team	League	GP	G	A	Pts	PIM	GP	G	A	Pts	PIM
2001–02	Sault Ste. Marie Greyhounds	OHL	45	0	3	3	46	3	0	0	0	2
2002–03	Sault Ste. Marie Greyhounds	OHL	55	2	6	8	116	4	0	0	0	7
2003–04	Sault Ste. Marie Greyhounds	OHL	66	6	18	24	140	—	—	—	—	—
2004–05	Sault Ste. Marie Greyhounds	OHL	40	2	11	13	101	—	—	—	—	—
2004–05	Ottawa 67's	OHL	30	5	8	13	80	21	4	16	20	70
2005–06	Cleveland Barons	AHL	71	0	6	6	245	—	—	—	—	—
2006–07	Worcester Sharks	AHL	51	1	4	5	137	5	0	0	0	13
2007–08	Worcester Sharks	AHL	73	6	14	20	195	—	—	—	—	—
2008–09	Worcester Sharks	AHL	38	0	5	5	130	10	0	2	2	15
2008–09	San Jose Sharks	NHL	35	1	2	3	76	—	—	—	—	—
2009–10	San Jose Sharks	NHL	47	3	3	6	110	—	—	—	—	—
2010–11	Minnesota Wild	NHL	71	4	5	9	173	—	—	—	—	—
2011–12	Minnesota Wild	NHL	43	0	0	0	73	—	—	—	—	—
2011–12	Houston Aeros	AHL	4	0	0	0	9	—	—	—	—	—
2011–12	Montreal Canadiens	NHL	19	1	0	1	48	—	—	—	—	—
2012–13	Anaheim Ducks	NHL	15	1	1	2	41	—	—	—	—	—
2013–14	Norfolk Admirals	AHL	6	0	0	0	10	—	—	—	—	—
2013–14	Toronto Marlies	AHL	48	2	2	4	116	—	—	—	—	—
2014–15	EV Landshut	DEL2	22	0	6	6	101	6	0	1	1	22
NHL totals			230	10	11	21	521	—	—	—	—	—
