= Troy Bodie =

Canadian ice hockey player (born 1985)

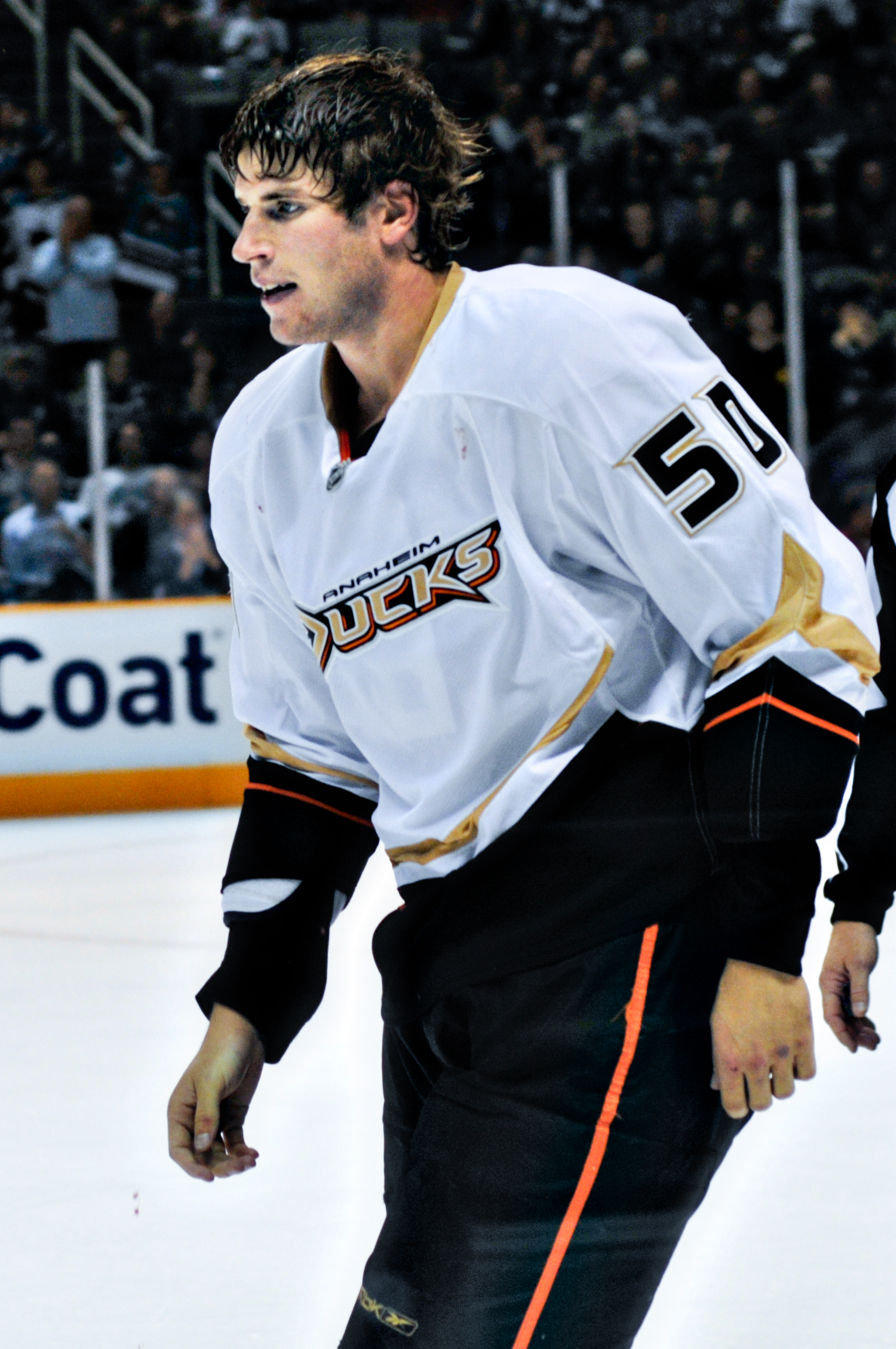
- Bodie with the Anaheim Ducks in 2009
- Born: January 25, 1985 (age 41) Portage la Prairie, Manitoba, Canada
- Height: 6 ft 4 in (193 cm)
- Weight: 220 lb (100 kg; 15 st 10 lb)
- Position: Right wing
- Shot: Right
- Played for: Anaheim Ducks; Carolina Hurricanes; Toronto Maple Leafs
- NHL draft: 278th overall, 2003; Edmonton Oilers
- Playing career: 2006–2015

Troy Bodie (born January 25, 1985) is a Canadian former professional ice hockey winger. Bodie was drafted by the Edmonton Oilers in the 2003 NHL entry draft. He last played for the Toronto Maple Leafs of the National Hockey League (NHL) but has also spent time with the Anaheim Ducks and Carolina Hurricanes. Since May 2021, he is the director of hockey and business operations for the Seattle Kraken's American Hockey League farm team, the Coachella Valley Firebirds.

== Playing career ==
Bodie was drafted 278th overall by the Edmonton Oilers in the 2003 NHL entry draft from the Western Hockey League's Kelowna Rockets. Bodie had spells in the ECHL with the Stockton Thunder and the American Hockey League for the Hamilton Bulldogs and the Springfield Falcons before signing a one-year contract with the Anaheim Ducks on July 22, 2008.

Bodie spent much of the 2008-09 season in the AHL with the Iowa Chops but played four games for the Ducks without scoring a point. Bodie re-signed with the Ducks to a two-year two-way contract on June 30, 2009.

On November 16, 2010, Bodie was claimed off of waivers from the Ducks by the Carolina Hurricanes. When playing for Carolina, Bodie racked up a total of 12 fights and 6 goals; one of which being the game winner in overtime against the Buffalo Sabres on goaltender Ryan Miller.

On October 12, 2011, Bodie signed a two-way contract worth $550,000 in the NHL and $105,000 in the AHL to return with the Anaheim Ducks. He was assigned for the duration of the 2011–12 season with Anaheim's farm team, the Syracuse Crunch in the AHL.

Continuing with the new Ducks affiliate, the Norfolk Admirals, on a try-out during the 2012–13 season, Bodie was later re-signed by the Ducks, on a one-year contract on January 16, 2013.

On July 10, 2013, Bodie signed a one-year, two-way contract with the Toronto Maple Leafs. During training camp in 2014, the Leafs assigned Bodie to their AHL-affiliate, the Toronto Marlies. Bodie would spend the next two seasons playing for both clubs and even served as Marlies captain during his final playing season, being given the honour on February 22, 2015.

== Post-playing career ==
On September 21, 2015, Bodie announced his retirement from the NHL and accepted a position as a professional scout with the Toronto Maple Leafs based out of the Los Angeles area. In 2018, he was promoted to director of professional scouting for the Leafs.

In May 2021, Bodie was hired by the Seattle Kraken expansion team to be the director of hockey and business operations of their American Hockey League farm team, the Coachella Valley Firebirds, set to begin play in 2022.

== Personal life ==
Bodie is married Francesca, the chief operating officer of the Oak View Group which was founded by her father, Tim Leiweke who also serves as its chairman and chief executive officer. Both him and his future wife married in August 2013 while her father served as president of Maple Leafs Sports & Entertainment.

== Career statistics ==
			Regular season					Playoffs
Season	Team	League	GP	G	A	Pts	PIM	GP	G	A	Pts	PIM
2000–01	Central Plain Capitals AAA	MMHL	39	20	19	39	14	—	—	—	—	—
2001–02	Central Plain Capitals AAA	MMHL	40	22	21	43	10	—	—	—	—	—
2002–03	Kelowna Rockets	WHL	35	4	4	8	36	11	1	1	2	2
2003–04	Kelowna Rockets	WHL	71	8	12	20	112	17	7	3	10	6
2004–05	Kelowna Rockets	WHL	72	24	24	48	96	24	4	13	17	26
2005–06	Kelowna Rockets	WHL	72	28	25	53	117	12	5	4	9	8
2006–07	Stockton Thunder	ECHL	46	21	17	38	80	6	0	2	2	6
2006–07	Hamilton Bulldogs	AHL	20	0	1	1	29	—	—	—	—	—
2007–08	Springfield Falcons	AHL	62	9	6	15	108	—	—	—	—	—
2008–09	Iowa Chops	AHL	71	15	12	27	105	—	—	—	—	—
2008–09	Anaheim Ducks	NHL	4	0	0	0	0	—	—	—	—	—
2009–10	San Antonio Rampage	AHL	16	2	1	3	43	—	—	—	—	—
2009–10	Toronto Marlies	AHL	16	6	4	10	13	—	—	—	—	—
2009–10	Anaheim Ducks	NHL	44	5	2	7	80	—	—	—	—	—
2010–11	Anaheim Ducks	NHL	9	0	1	1	7	—	—	—	—	—
2010–11	Carolina Hurricanes	NHL	50	1	2	3	54	—	—	—	—	—
2011–12	Syracuse Crunch	AHL	69	5	10	15	119	4	0	0	0	0
2012–13	Norfolk Admirals	AHL	47	4	8	12	111	—	—	—	—	—
2012–13	Portland Pirates	AHL	5	3	1	4	7	2	0	0	0	2
2013–14	Toronto Maple Leafs	NHL	47	3	7	10	26	—	—	—	—	—
2013–14	Toronto Marlies	AHL	17	4	4	8	9	—	—	—	—	—
2014–15	Toronto Maple Leafs	NHL	5	0	0	0	5	—	—	—	—	—
2014–15	Toronto Marlies	AHL	58	8	7	15	77	3	1	0	1	2
AHL totals			381	56	54	110	621	9	1	0	1	4
NHL totals			159	10	13	23	172	—	—	—	—	—
