= Mario Scalzo =

Canadian ice hockey player

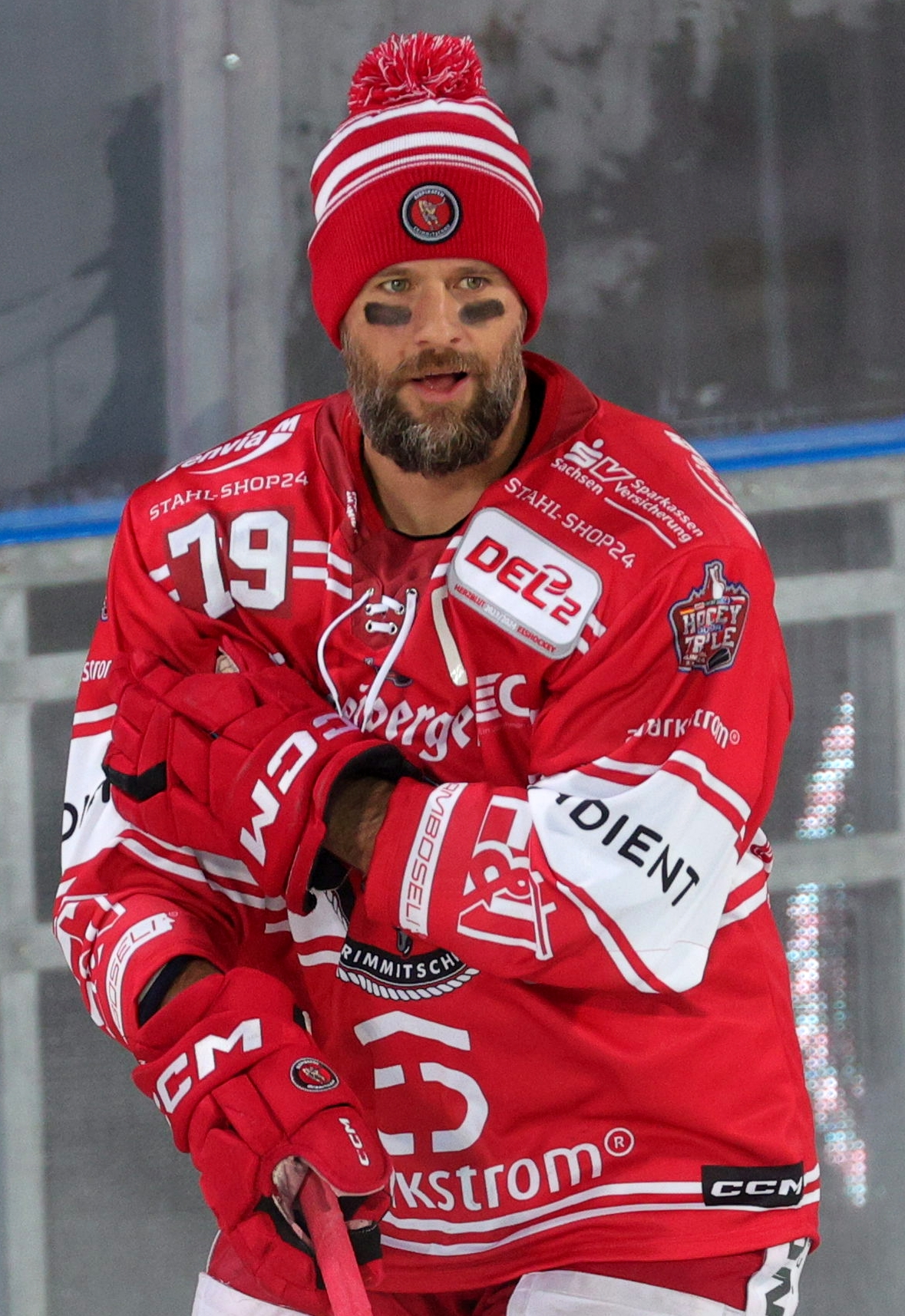
- Scalzo in 2024
- Born: November 11, 1984 (age 40); Saint-Hubert, Quebec, Canada
- Height: 5 ft 10 in (178 cm)
- Weight: 190 lb (86 kg; 13 st 8 lb)
- Position: Defence
- Shoots: Left
- DEL team Former teams: Adler Mannheim; Iowa Stars; Norfolk Admirals; EC Red Bull Salzburg
- National team: Canada
- Playing career: 2005–present

Mario Scalzo (born November 11, 1984) is a Canadian professional ice hockey player. Scalzo is currently playing for Eispiraten Crimmitschau in the DEL2.

== Career ==
Born in Saint-Hubert, Quebec, Scalzo played junior hockey in the Quebec Major Junior Hockey League for the Victoriaville Tigres and the Rimouski Océanic. He is perhaps the most well known for his junior hockey days in Rimouski where he played on the 2005 Memorial Cup runner-up team captained by Sidney Crosby. Other major pieces of that team included Marc Antoine Poulliot and Dany Roussin, both linemates of Crosby. That year, the three along with Scalzo lead the Oceanic in scoring. After signing as a free agent with the Dallas Stars of the NHL in 2005, Scalzo spent three seasons in the American Hockey League playing for the Iowa Stars and the Norfolk Admirals. He was traded to the Tampa Bay Lightning organization in 2007 for Bryce Lampman. Scalzo joined Red Bull Salzburg in 2008 and signed than on 7 April 2009 with Adler Mannheim. On April 29, 2011, Scalzo was added to the Canadian roster for the 2011 IIHF World Championship held in Slovakia .

== Career statistics ==
=== Regular season and playoffs ===
			Regular season					Playoffs
Season	Team	League	GP	G	A	Pts	PIM	GP	G	A	Pts	PIM
2000–01	Collège Antoine-Girouard	QMAAA	6	0	1	1	4	—	—	—	—	—
2001–02	Collège Antoine-Girouard	QMAAA	40	8	27	35	50	—	—	—	—	—
2001–02	Victoriaville Tigres	QMJHL	1	0	1	1	0	1	0	0	0	0
2002–03	Victoriaville Tigres	QMJHL	72	10	34	44	134	4	0	3	3	6
2003–04	Victoriaville Tigres	QMJHL	68	16	52	68	113	—	—	—	—	—
2004–05	Victoriaville Tigres	QMJHL	39	11	19	30	73	—	—	—	—	—
2004–05	Rimouski Océanic	QMJHL	23	13	31	44	31	13	7	14	21	10
2005–06	Iowa Stars	AHL	74	4	29	33	42	7	0	2	2	8
2006–07	Iowa Stars	AHL	73	4	21	25	89	9	0	3	3	10
2007–08	Iowa Stars	AHL	15	1	8	9	10	—	—	—	—	—
2007–08	Norfolk Admirals	AHL	48	4	16	20	27	—	—	—	—	—
2008–09	EC Salzburg	AUT	47	10	30	40	116	15	4	8	12	16
2009–10	Adler Mannheim	DEL	45	11	17	28	39	—	—	—	—	—
2010–11	Adler Mannheim	DEL	51	13	19	32	52	6	0	2	2	2
2011–12	EHC Biel	NLA	5	1	0	1	25	—	—	—	—	—
2011–12	SC Bern	NLA	6	2	2	4	0	—	—	—	—	—
2011–12	TPS	SM-l	38	4	10	14	50	2	0	0	0	2
2012–13	Graz 99ers	AUT	37	4	16	20	52	5	0	1	1	4
2013–14	Graz 99ers	AUT	32	1	10	11	16	—	—	—	—	—
2014–15	Piráti Chomutov	CZE.2	18	2	0	2	8	3	0	0	0	4
2016–17	Gamyo d'Épinal	FRA	26	0	9	9	32	4	1	2	3	12
2019–20	Kassel Huskies	DEU.2	28	3	15	18	24	—	—	—	—	—
AHL totals			210	13	74	87	168	16	0	5	5	18
AUT totals			116	15	56	71	184	20	4	9	13	20

=== International ===
Year	Team	Event	GP	G	A	Pts	PIM
2011	Canada	WC	3	0	2	2	0
