= Sestito =

Sestito is a surname. Notable people with the surname include:

- Tim Sestito (born 1984), American ice hockey player
- Tom Sestito (born 1987), American ice hockey player
