= John Vigilante =

American ice hockey player (1985–2018)

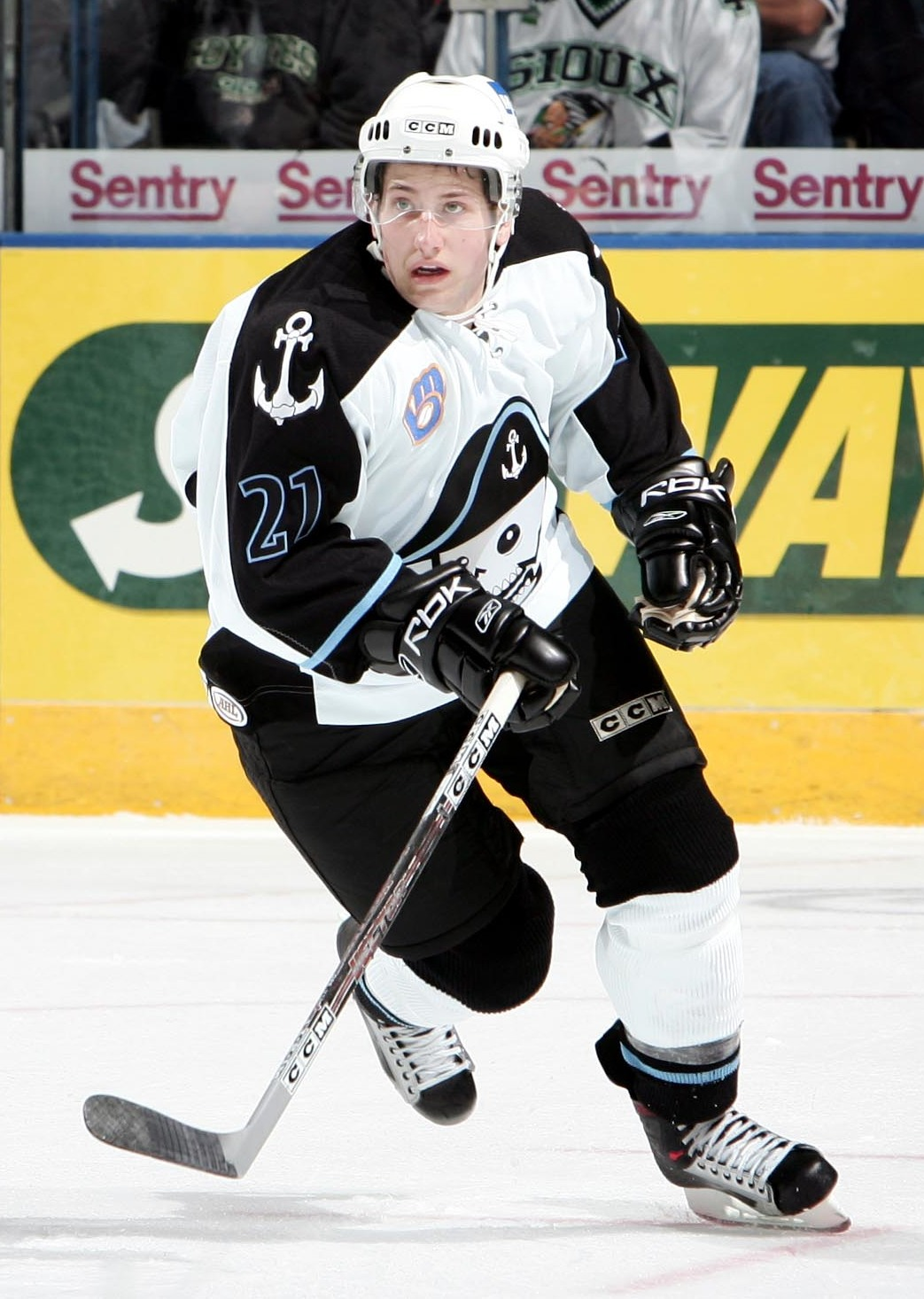
- Vigilante with the Milwaukee Admirals in 2006
- Born: May 24, 1985 Dearborn, Michigan, U.S.
- Died: July 18, 2018 (aged 33) Dearborn, Michigan, U.S.
- Height: 6 ft 0 in (183 cm)
- Weight: 167.5 lb (76 kg; 12 st 0 lb)
- Position: Left wing
- Shot: Left
- Played for: Milwaukee Admirals; Syracuse Crunch; Quad City Flames; Grand Rapids Griffins; IK Oskarshamn
- NHL draft: Undrafted
- Playing career: 2006–2013

John Vigilante (May 24, 1985 – July 18, 2018) was an American professional ice hockey forward. He grew up in Dearborn, Michigan and was a graduate of Edsel Ford High School in 2003. Vigilante died at the age of 33.

== Playing career ==
Undrafted, Vigilante was an Ontario Hockey League priority selection for the Plymouth Whalers in the 11th Round (209th) in 2001. Vigilante was named the team captain of the Whalers at the beginning of the 2005–06 OHL season. He represented the Whalers at the 2006 OHL All-Star Game, held in Belleville, Ontario. His season was cut short with a broken finger after blocking a shot by the Barrie Colts, as they surged looking for a tying goal at the end of a game. Out for a month, Vigilante returned for the final three games of the regular season to help Plymouth win the West Division.

Vigilante was signed by the Nashville Predators of the National Hockey League (NHL) on December 7, 2005. Vigilante was then assigned to Nashville's American Hockey League (AHL) affiliate, the Milwaukee Admirals, where he made his professional debut.

On July 8, 2008, Vigilante was signed by the Columbus Blue Jackets to a one-year deal. He was then assigned to their AHL affiliate, the Syracuse Crunch, where he played with former Plymouth Whaler teammates Jared Boll and Tom Sestito. Midway through the 2008–09 season on February 21, 2009, Vigilante was reassigned by the Blue Jackets when he was loaned to the Quad City Flames for the remainder of the season.

On September 11, 2009, Vigilante signed with the Grand Rapids Griffins, the Detroit Red Wings' AHL affiliate. After appearing in one preseason game, Vigilante was released from his tryout contract with Detroit and assigned to the Griffins.

On June 1, 2012, Vigilante signed with Swedish team IK Oskarshamn, playing in league Hockeyallsvenskan.

== Coaching career ==
On April 9, 2014, Vigilante was announced as the new head coach, beginning with the 2014-15 season, of the Compuware Midget Majors of the Compuware Youth Program.

At the time of his death, he was the head coach for the 19U Belle Tire Girls Hockey Program.

== Career statistics ==
			Regular season					Playoffs
Season	Team	League	GP	G	A	Pts	PIM	GP	G	A	Pts	PIM
2002–03	Plymouth Whalers	OHL	65	15	24	39	31	18	6	3	9	8
2003–04	Plymouth Whalers	OHL	66	30	38	68	25	9	1	7	8	8
2004–05	Plymouth Whalers	OHL	68	24	38	62	17	4	0	0	0	0
2005–06	Plymouth Whalers	OHL	55	24	53	77	34	13	4	12	16	0
2006–07	Milwaukee Admirals	AHL	62	8	19	27	10	2	0	0	0	2
2007–08	Milwaukee Admirals	AHL	73	15	31	46	12	6	0	1	1	0
2008–09	Syracuse Crunch	AHL	52	7	8	15	14	—	—	—	—	—
2008–09	Quad City Flames	AHL	24	7	8	15	2	—	—	—	—	—
2009–10	Grand Rapids Griffins	AHL	14	3	3	6	0	—	—	—	—	—
2012-13	IK Oskarshamn	HA	52	9	17	26	50	6	0	1	1	2
AHL totals			211	37	66	103	38	8	0	1	1	2
