= James Wisniewski =

American ice hockey player (born 1984)

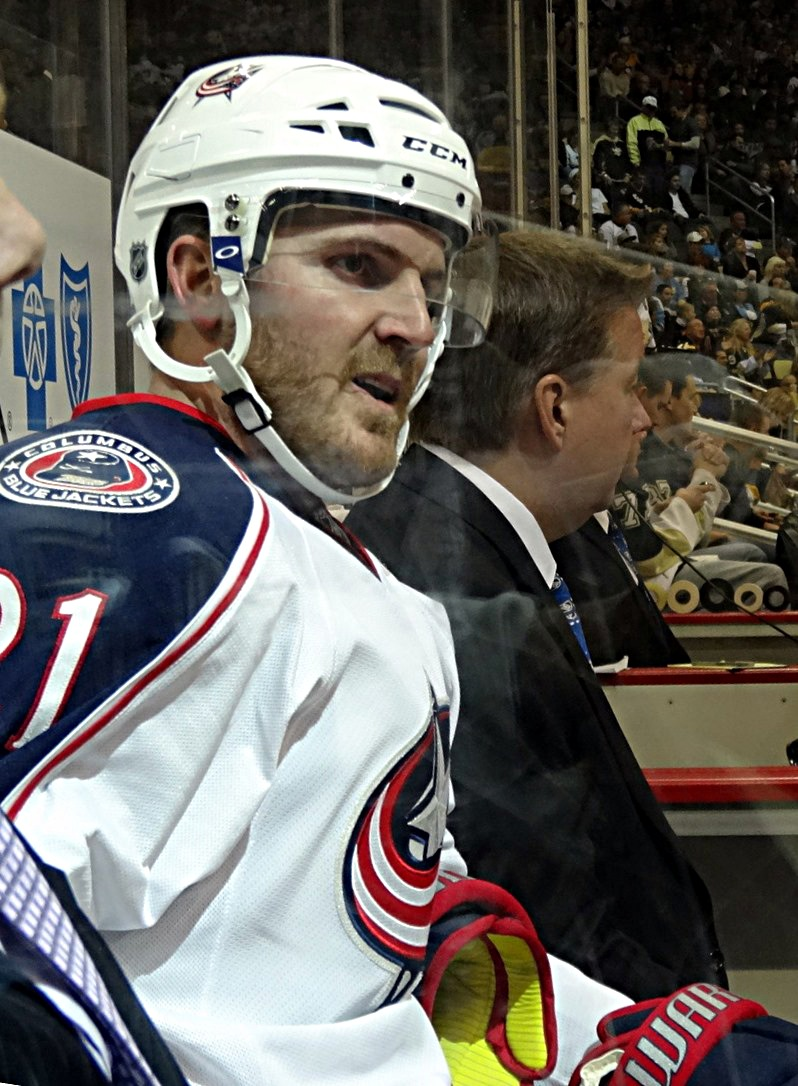
- Wisniewski with the Columbus Blue Jackets in 2013
- Born: February 21, 1984 (age 42) Canton, Michigan, U.S.
- Height: 5 ft 11 in (180 cm)
- Weight: 203 lb (92 kg; 14 st 7 lb)
- Position: Defense
- Shot: Right
- Played for: Chicago Blackhawks; Anaheim Ducks; New York Islanders; Montreal Canadiens; Columbus Blue Jackets; Carolina Hurricanes; Admiral Vladivostok; Kassel Huskies
- National team: United States
- NHL draft: 156th overall, 2002; Chicago Blackhawks
- Playing career: 2004–2018

James Joseph Wisniewski (born February 21, 1984) is an American former professional ice hockey defenseman. He most recently played for the Kassel Huskies of the German DEL2. He has previously played in the National Hockey League (NHL) for the Chicago Blackhawks, Anaheim Ducks, New York Islanders, Montreal Canadiens, Columbus Blue Jackets, and Carolina Hurricanes.

== Playing career ==
=== Early years ===
As a youth, Wisniewski played in the 1998 Quebec International Pee-Wee Hockey Tournament with the Detroit Compuware minor ice hockey team.

Wisniewski started his junior ice hockey career with the Plymouth Whalers of the Ontario Hockey League (OHL) in 2000. He improved every year significantly, and was drafted in the fifth round, 156th overall, by the Chicago Blackhawks in 2002. At the start of the 2003–04 season, he was named captain of the Whalers. That year, he scored 17 goals, 11 on the power-play. He finished 24th in overall scoring with 70 points, third amongst defensemen and just six points short of the OHL lead, set by Kingston Frontenacs defenseman Bryan Rodney. For his efforts, Wisniewski was awarded the OHL's 2004 Max Kaminsky Trophy as the most outstanding defenseman. He also took home the OHL's parent league, the Canadian Hockey League (CHL)'s, Defenseman of the Year award. This recognition gained Wisniewski a contract with Chicago, and a jump to the American Hockey League (AHL)'s Norfolk Admirals, the Blackhawks' top minor league affiliate.

Wisniewski was called up early to the Blackhawks in the 2006–07 season and stuck with the team. However, he tore his anterior cruciate ligament (ACL) during the first period in a game against the Los Angeles Kings on March 5, 2007, and was placed on injured reserve, missing the rest of the season.

=== Anaheim Ducks ===
On March 4, 2009, Wisniewski was traded by the Blackhawks, along with Finnish forward Petri Kontiola, to the Anaheim Ducks in exchange for Samuel Påhlsson and Logan Stephenson.

In the 2009–10 season, Wisniewski entrenched himself in the Ducks' defense corps and scored a career-high 30 points in 69 games. On March 17, 2010, in a game against former team, the Blackhawks, Wisniewski delivered a retaliation hit to Brent Seabrook, his former teammate and good friend, driving his head against the glass. Wisniewski received an eight-game suspension for the hit; the last player to receive a suspension of that length was former Duck Chris Pronger.

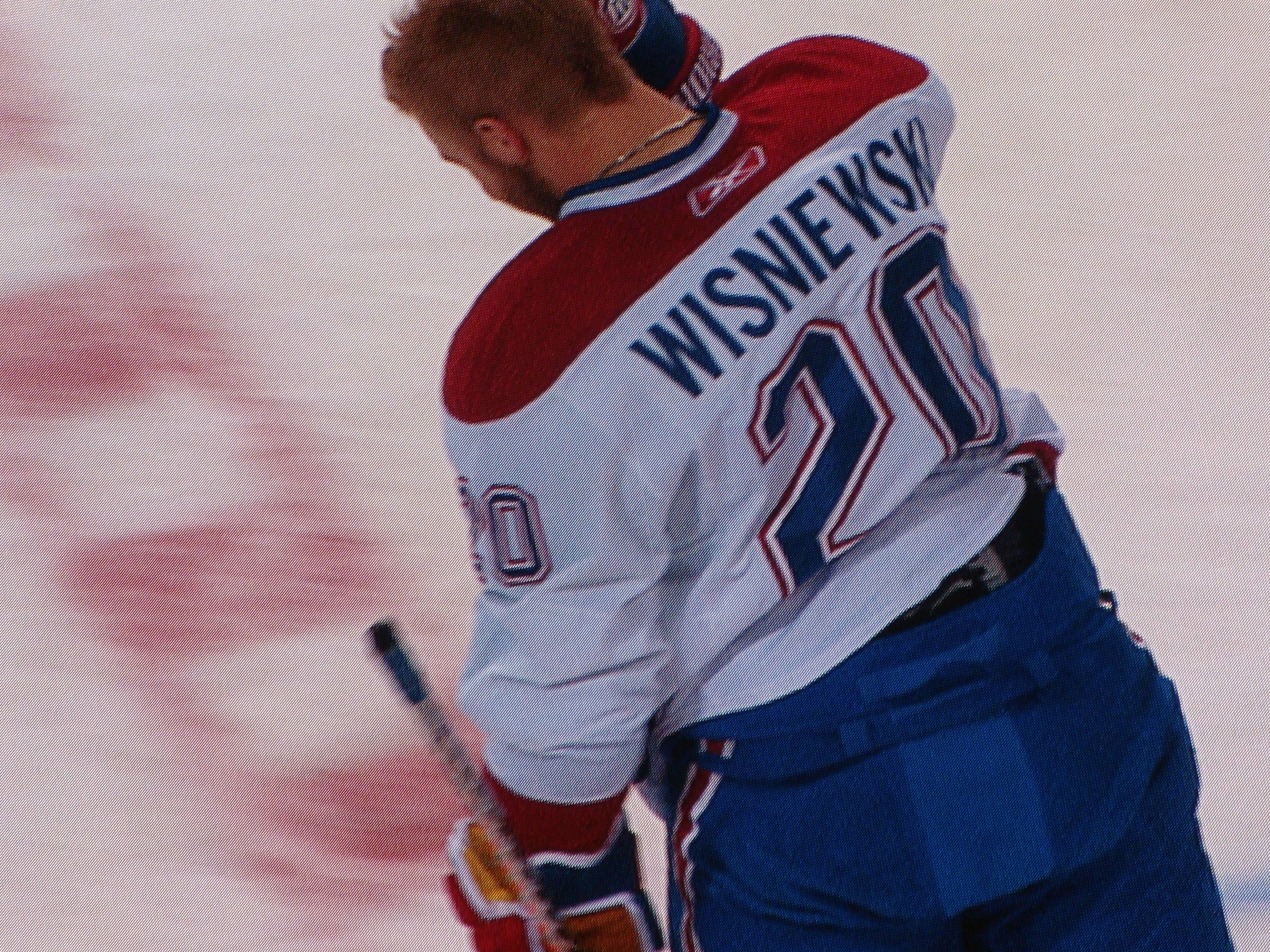
Wisniewski in 2011 during his tenure with the Montreal Canadiens

=== Islanders and Canadiens ===
On July 30, 2010, Wisniewski was traded by the Ducks to the New York Islanders for a conditional third-round pick in the 2011 NHL entry draft.

At the beginning of the 2010–11 season, on October 12, 2010, Wisniewski was suspended for two games for making an obscene gesture towards Sean Avery.

On December 28, 2010, Wisniewski was traded to the Montreal Canadiens for second-round pick in the 2011 Draft and conditional fifth round pick in 2012. He scored seven goals to go with 23 assists in 43 games with the Canadiens, as well as two assists in six playoff games.

=== Columbus Blue Jackets ===
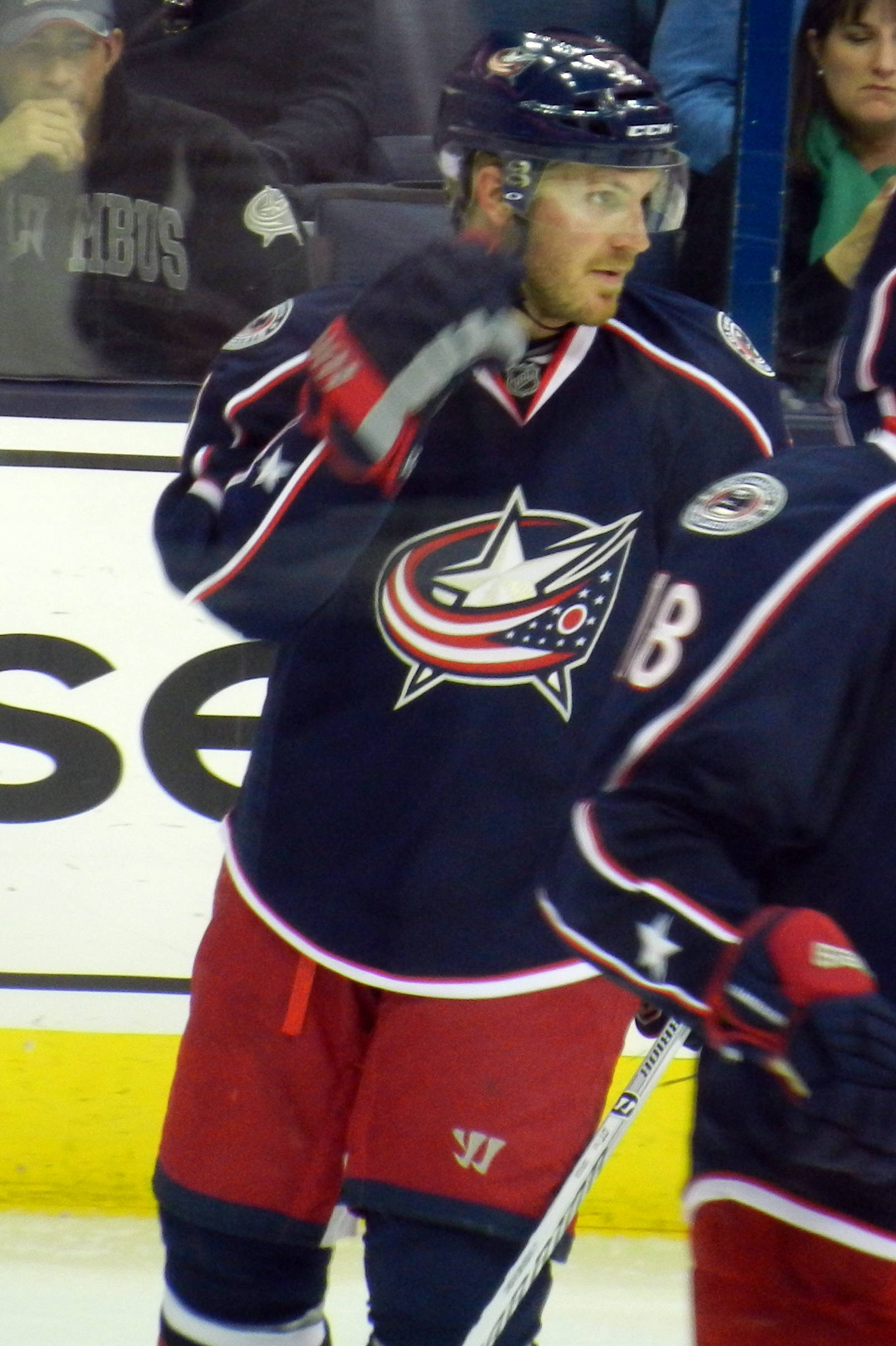
With the Blue Jackets in 2013

On June 29, 2011, Wisniewski's rights were traded to the Columbus Blue Jackets in exchange for a conditional seventh-round draft pick in 2012; the pick would become a fifth-rounder if Columbus signed him. He subsequently signed a six-year, $33 million contract with the Blue Jackets on July 1, 2011.

On September 26, 2011, Wisniewski was suspended for the remainder of the pre-season and eight regular season games by the NHL for a hit to the head of Minnesota Wild forward Cal Clutterbuck on September 23 after the end of regulation. In an injury-shortened 2011–12 season, Wisniewski appeared in 48 games with Columbus, scoring six goals along with 21 assists as the Blue Jackets finished well out of the playoff hunt.

Wisniewski would again suffer another season plagued by injuries in the lockout-shortened 2012–13 season, producing 14 points in 30 games with the Blue Jackets. However, in 2013–14, he scored seven goals and a career-high 51 points in 75 games, tied with the St. Louis Blues' Alex Pietrangelo for ninth in points among NHL defensemen, helping the Blue Jackets clinch their first playoff berth since 2009.

=== Second stint with the Ducks ===
On March 2, 2015, Wisniewski was traded by the Blue Jackets to the Anaheim Ducks, along with a 2015 third-round pick, in exchange for Rene Bourque, William Karlsson and a 2015 second-round pick, marking the beginning of his second term with the Ducks.

=== Hurricanes and Lightning ===
On June 27, 2015, the second day of the 2015 NHL entry draft, Wisniewski was traded to the Carolina Hurricanes In exchange for Anton Khudobin. In the 2015–16 season, in his first game with the Hurricanes on opening night, Wisniewski suffered a tear to his left ACL after playing in just 47 seconds, which effectively ended his season. Wisniewski's brief shift with the Hurricanes would be his last, for in the off-season and nearing a return to full health, he was bought out from the final year of his contract on June 30, 2016.

On August 10, 2016, the Lightning signed Wisniewski to a professional tryout agreement. On October 2, 2016, as part of the Lightning's roster reduction, the Lightning announced that it had released Wisniewski from his tryout agreement.

=== Abroad ===
Wisniewski signed with Admiral Vladivostok of the Kontinental Hockey League (KHL) for the 2016–17 season and parted ways with the club in December 2016 after 16 games. He then headed to Switzerland to join HC Lugano for the Spengler Cup. He helped the club get to the Spengler Cup final and was named to the tournament's all-star team.

On January 26, 2017, Wisniewski signed a contract for a 25-game professional tryout with the Chicago Wolves of the AHL, affiliate to the St. Louis Blues, before moving back to Europe, signing with German DEL2 side Kassel Huskies on October 11, 2017.

== Personal ==
Wisniewski attended Canton High School in Canton, Michigan.

Wisniewski and his wife Nicole have two daughters. Wisniewski started a clothing line called WizWear. According to Wisniewski, "I always like to dress nice and have my own style. We support the USO of Illinois, the families of fallen soldiers. I wanted to do something a little bit different to set up for a charity than a golf tournament or bowling event. It's something I can have a little bit of fun with also." Both of his grandfathers fought in World War II.

Wisniewski is the nephew of former NHL player and coach Billy Dea.

== Career statistics ==
=== Regular season and playoffs ===
			Regular season					Playoffs
Season	Team	League	GP	G	A	Pts	PIM	GP	G	A	Pts	PIM
1999–2000	Detroit Compuware Ambassadors	NAHL	50	5	11	16	67	5	0	3	3	4
2000–01	Plymouth Whalers	OHL	53	6	23	29	72	19	3	10	13	34
2001–02	Plymouth Whalers	OHL	62	11	25	36	100	6	1	2	3	6
2002–03	Plymouth Whalers	OHL	52	18	34	52	60	18	2	10	12	14
2003–04	Plymouth Whalers	OHL	50	17	53	70	63	9	3	7	10	8
2004–05	Norfolk Admirals	AHL	66	7	18	25	110	5	1	3	4	2
2005–06	Norfolk Admirals	AHL	61	7	28	35	67	4	1	2	3	6
2005–06	Chicago Blackhawks	NHL	19	2	5	7	36	—	—	—	—	—
2006–07	Norfolk Admirals	AHL	10	0	6	6	8	—	—	—	—	—
2006–07	Chicago Blackhawks	NHL	50	2	8	10	39	—	—	—	—	—
2007–08	Chicago Blackhawks	NHL	68	7	19	26	103	—	—	—	—	—
2008–09	Rockford IceHogs	AHL	2	3	1	4	0	—	—	—	—	—
2008–09	Chicago Blackhawks	NHL	31	2	11	13	14	—	—	—	—	—
2008–09	Anaheim Ducks	NHL	17	1	10	11	16	12	1	2	3	10
2009–10	Anaheim Ducks	NHL	69	3	27	30	56	—	—	—	—	—
2010–11	New York Islanders	NHL	32	3	18	21	18	—	—	—	—	—
2010–11	Montreal Canadiens	NHL	43	7	23	30	20	6	0	2	2	7
2011–12	Columbus Blue Jackets	NHL	48	6	21	27	37	—	—	—	—	—
2012–13	Columbus Blue Jackets	NHL	30	5	9	14	15	—	—	—	—	—
2013–14	Columbus Blue Jackets	NHL	75	7	44	51	61	6	0	2	2	10
2014–15	Columbus Blue Jackets	NHL	56	8	21	29	34	—	—	—	—	—
2014–15	Anaheim Ducks	NHL	13	0	5	5	10	—	—	—	—	—
2015–16	Carolina Hurricanes	NHL	1	0	0	0	0	—	—	—	—	—
2016–17	Admiral Vladivostok	KHL	16	1	3	4	39	—	—	—	—	—
2016–17	Chicago Wolves	AHL	21	4	7	11	30	5	0	2	2	0
2017–18	Kassel Huskies	DEL2	33	9	35	44	28	—	—	—	—	—
NHL totals			552	53	221	274	459	24	1	6	7	27

=== International ===
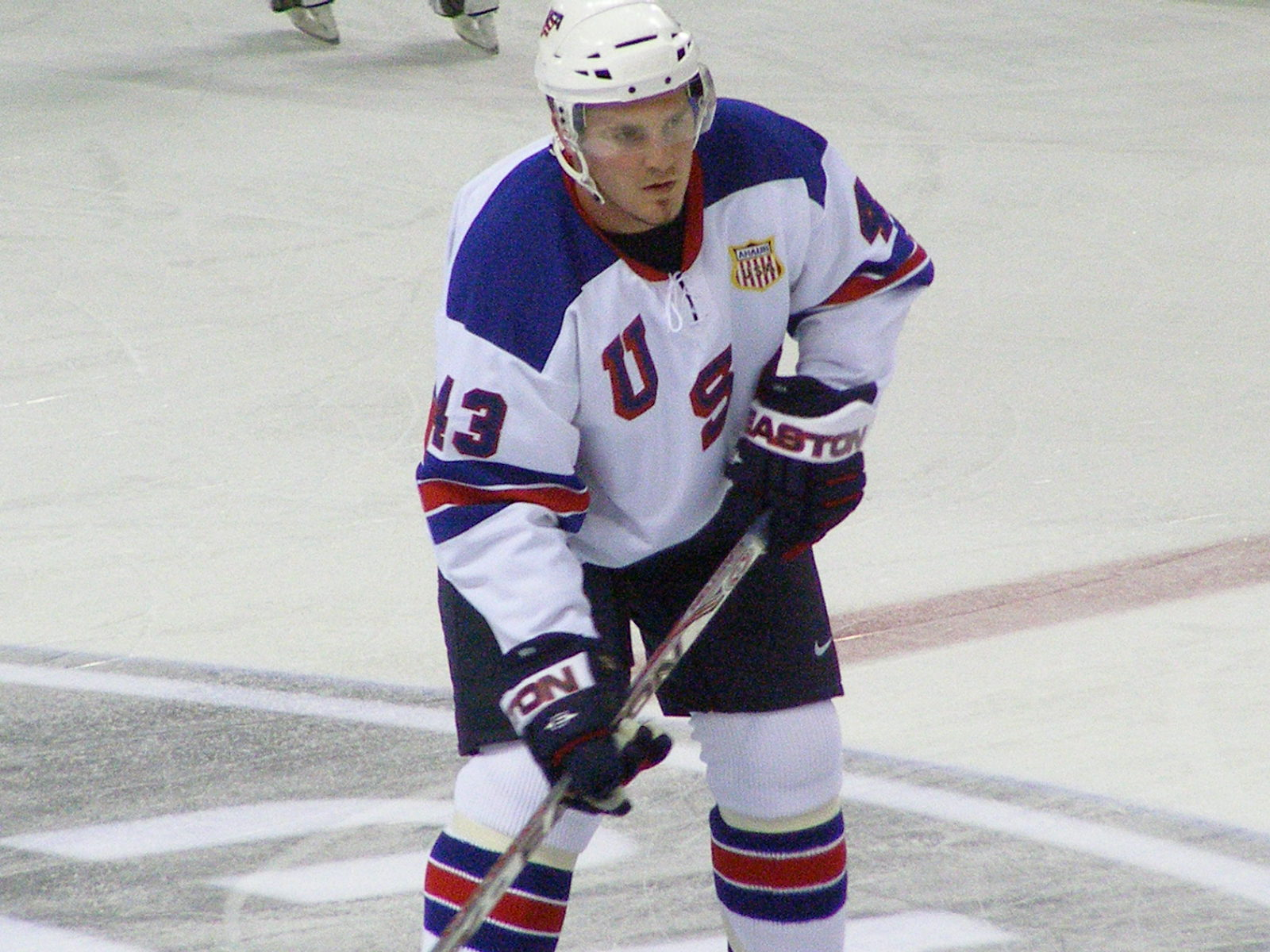
- Wisniewski at the 2008 IIHF World Championship

Medal record

Representing United States

Ice hockey

World Junior Championships
Gold medal – first place	2004 Helsinki	

World U18 Championships
Gold medal – first place	2002 Trnava	

Year	Team	Event	Result	GP	G	A	Pts	PIM
2002	United States	WJC18	1st place, gold medalist(s)	3	1	2	3	6
2003	United States	WJC	4th	7	0	4	4	6
2004	United States	WJC	1st place, gold medalist(s)	6	2	3	5	4
2008	United States	WC	6th	6	1	2	3	6
2018	United States	OG	7th	5	1	1	2	2
Junior totals				16	3	9	12	16
Senior totals				11	2	3	5	8

== Awards and achievements ==
Award	Year
OHL
First All-Rookie Team	2001
CHL Top Prospects Game	2002
First All-Star Team	2004
Max Kaminsky Trophy	2004
CHL First All-Star Team	2004
CHL Defenseman of the Year	2004
