= Mickey Renaud Captain's Trophy =

- Sport: Ice hockey
- Awarded for: OHL team captain that best exemplifies leadership on and off the ice, with a passion and dedication to the game of hockey and his community.

History
- First award: 2009
- Most recent: Brady Martin

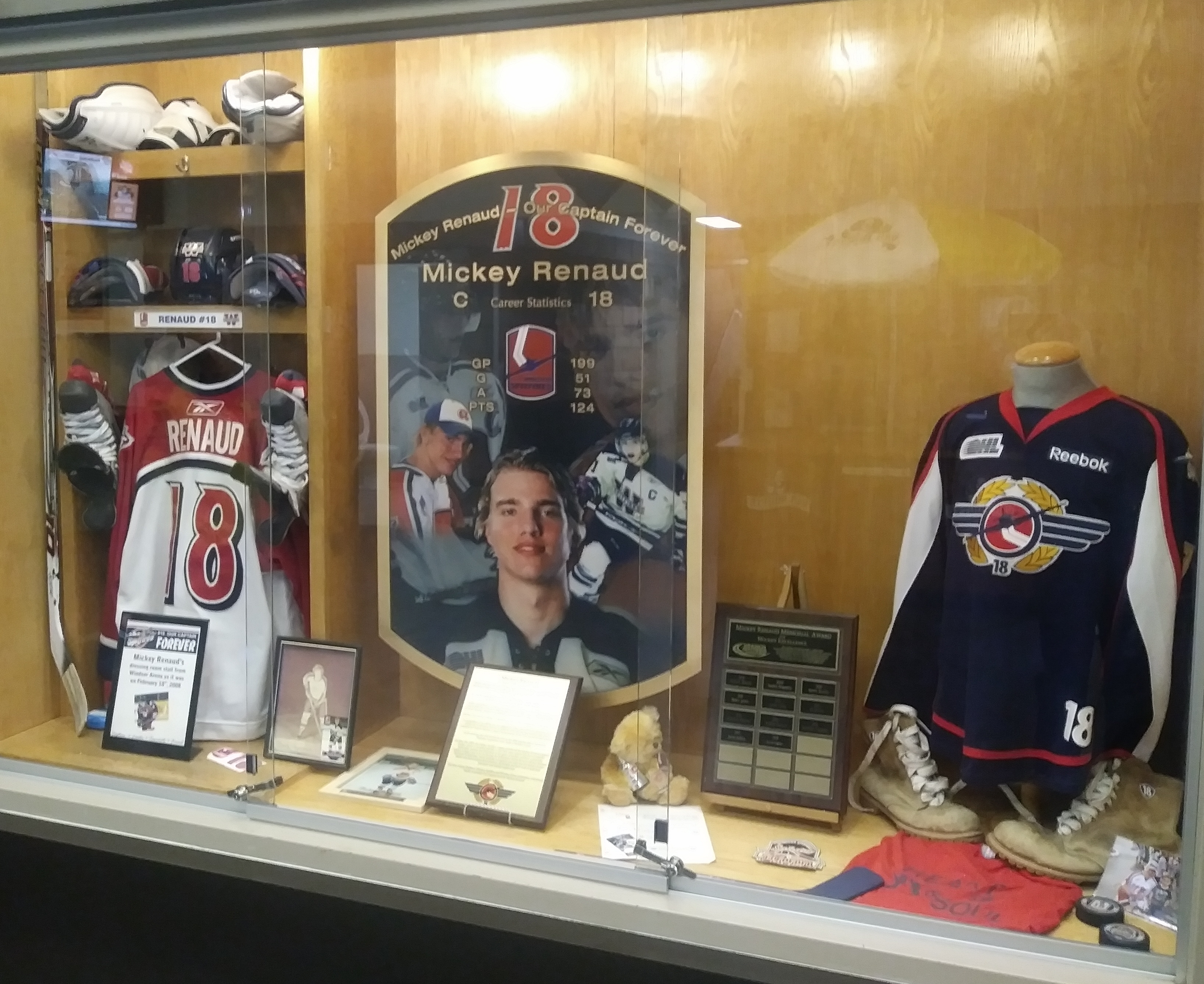
Renaud's memorial display at the WFCU Centre

The Mickey Renaud Captain's Trophy is an award in the Ontario Hockey League which is given to one team captain every year. The award was introduced on February 4, 2009, at the 2009 OHL All-Star Classic hosted at the WFCU Centre in Windsor. The award is given to "the OHL team captain that best exemplifies leadership on and off the ice, with a passion and dedication to the game of hockey and his community" as was demonstrated by Renaud throughout his OHL career.

Renaud was the captain of the Windsor Spitfires, and a fifth round draft pick for the Calgary Flames, before his sudden death on February 18, 2008, due to hypertrophic cardiomyopathy. The Spitfires retired his number 18 on September 25, 2008. Renaud was the son of former NHL defenceman, Mark Renaud.

== Recipients ==
- Recipients of the Mickey Renaud Captain's Trophy.

Season	Winner	Team
2008–09	Chris Terry	Plymouth Whalers
2009–10	John Kurtz	Sudbury Wolves
2010–11	Ryan Ellis	Windsor Spitfires
2011–12	Andrew Agozzino	Niagara IceDogs
2012–13	Colin Miller	Sault Ste. Marie Greyhounds
2013–14	Matt Finn	Guelph Storm
2014–15	Max Domi	London Knights
2015–16	Michael Webster	Barrie Colts
2016–17	Alex Peters	Flint Firebirds
2017–18	Justin Lemcke	Hamilton Bulldogs
2018–19	Isaac Ratcliffe	Guelph Storm
2019–20	Ty Dellandrea	Flint Firebirds
2020–21	Not awarded, season cancelled due to COVID-19 pandemic	
2021–22	Mark Woolley	Owen Sound Attack
2022–23	Nolan Dillingham	Sarnia Sting
2023–24	Braden Hache	Saginaw Spirit
2024–25	Liam Greentree	Windsor Spitfires
2025–26	Brady Martin	Sault Ste. Marie Greyhounds

== See also ==
- List of Canadian Hockey League awards
