= Chris Terry (ice hockey) =

Canadian ice hockey player (born 1989)

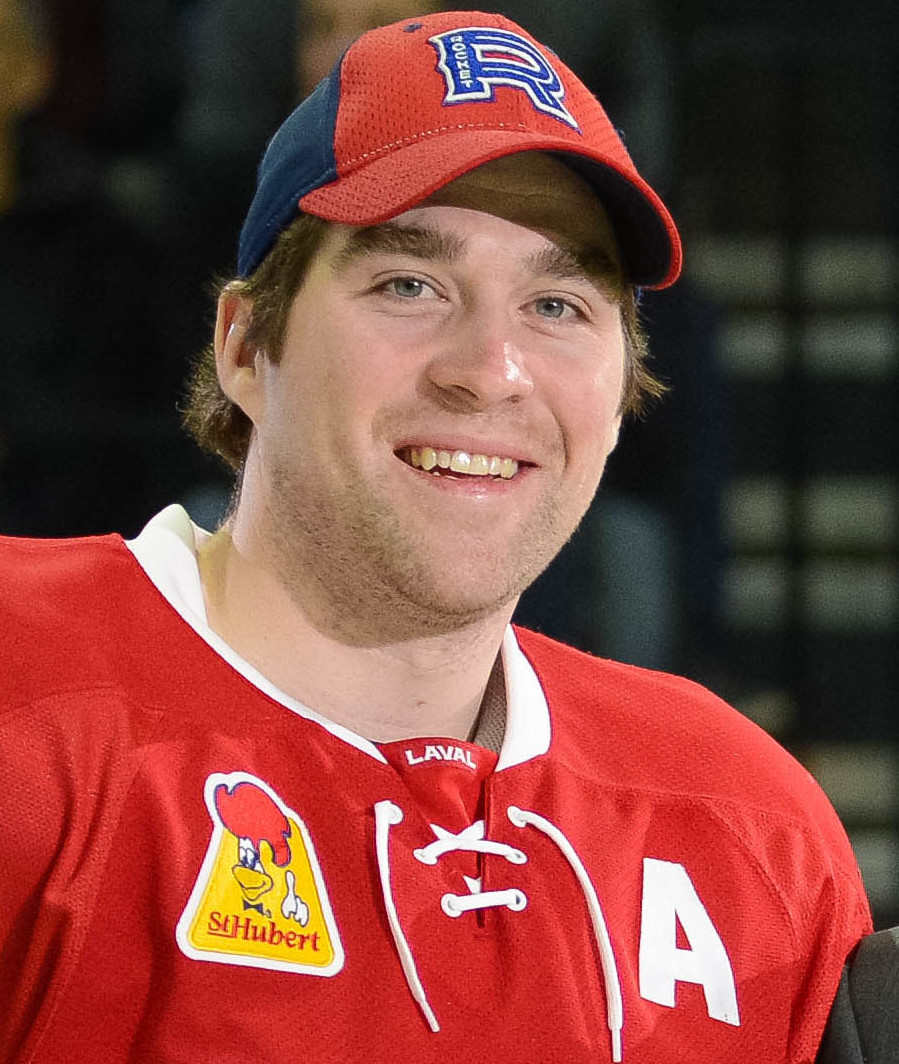
- Terry with the Laval Rocket in 2018
- Born: April 7, 1989 (age 37) Brampton, Ontario, Canada
- Height: 5 ft 10 in (178 cm)
- Weight: 195 lb (88 kg; 13 st 13 lb)
- Position: Left wing
- Shoots: Left
- AHL team Former teams: Free agent Carolina Hurricanes; Montreal Canadiens; Torpedo Nizhny Novgorod
- NHL draft: 132nd overall, 2007; Carolina Hurricanes
- Playing career: 2008–present

Chris Terry (born April 7, 1989) is a Canadian professional ice hockey forward who is currently an unrestricted free agent. He most recently played for the Bridgeport Islanders of the American Hockey League (AHL). He was selected in the fifth round, 132nd overall, by the Carolina Hurricanes of the National Hockey League (NHL) in the 2007 NHL entry draft.

== Playing career ==
=== Junior ===
Terry was drafted by the Plymouth Whalers in the second round, 29th overall in the 2005 OHL Draft from the Markham Islanders. In his rookie season as a 16-year-old with the Whalers, Terry recorded 28 points in 64 games, followed by five points in 11 games in the playoffs during the 2005–06 season.

Terry's production increased to 66 points in 68 games with Plymouth in the 2006–07 season, finishing with the third highest point total on the team. Terry followed that up with 18 points in 20 post-season games, helping the Whalers win the J. Ross Robertson Cup, and a berth to the 2007 Memorial Cup. Plymouth would lose to the eventual champion Vancouver Giants in the semi-finals. After the season, Terry was drafted by the Carolina Hurricanes in the 2007 NHL entry draft.

During the 2007–08 season, the Whalers named Terry as their captain during road games. Terry would enjoy a breakout season, finishing sixth in the OHL with 44 goals and 101 points. He then led the Whalers in playoff scoring, earning seven points in four games.

Terry was named the Whalers full-time captain in the 2008–09 season, and he continued putting up impressive offensive numbers, finishing second in league scoring with 94 points in 53 games. In 11 playoff games, Terry finished with 16 points, tied for the team lead. After the season, Terry was awarded the Mickey Renaud Captain's Trophy and the Dan Snyder Memorial Trophy by the league.

In 253 career games with the Whalers, Terry finished with 289 points, third highest in team history.

=== Professional ===
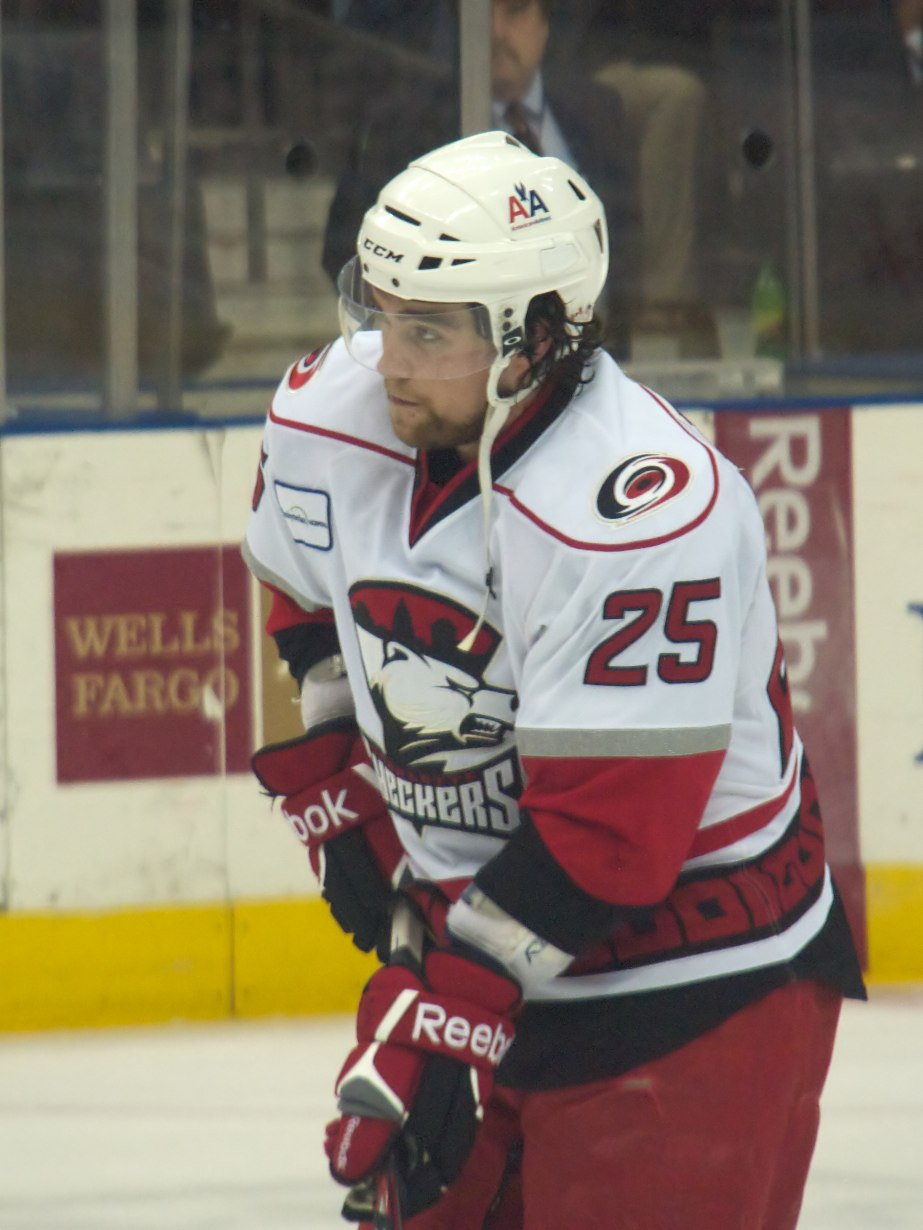
Terry playing with the Charlotte Checkers.

After his junior team was eliminated in the playoffs in 2008, the Carolina Hurricanes assigned Terry on an amateur try-out contract to their AHL affiliate, the Albany River Rats at the end of the 2007–08 season. He made his professional debut and in one game went pointless for the Rats. Following another year with the Whalers, Terry was signed by the Hurricanes to a three-year entry-level contract on May 29, 2009.

After attending the Hurricanes training camp, Terry returned to Albany for his first full professional season in the 2009–10 season. Terry remained in the AHL, until the 2012–13 season, when he was recalled and made his NHL debut on March 9 against the New Jersey Devils at PNC Arena. He recorded his first NHL goal and point in his debut.

After the 2015–16 season, having completed his first full season in the NHL, Terry left the Hurricanes as a free agent after seven seasons with the club. On July 2, 2016, Terry was signed to a one-year, two-way deal with the Montreal Canadiens.

Terry had a memorable 2017–18 season, despite spending it in the AHL. Near the beginning of the season, Terry was named an alternate captain along with Matt Taormina. He was named to the AHL All-Star Classic and earned AHL player of the month in March. At the conclusion of the 2017–18 season, Terry was named to the AHL First All-Star team. He was also recognized as the Laval Rockets AHL Man of the Year for his charity and community involvement. Terry was later awarded the AHL Leading Scorer title after finishing the season with a career-high 71 points.

On July 1, 2018, Terry signed as a free agent to a two-year, two-way contract with the Detroit Red Wings.

At the conclusion of his contract with the Red Wings, having played exclusively with AHL affiliate, the Grand Rapids Griffins, Terry left the club as a free agent. With the 2020–21 North American season delayed due to the COVID-19 pandemic, and approaching his 12th professional season, Terry opted to sign his first contract abroad, agreeing to a one-year contract for the remainder of the season with Russian outfit Torpedo Nizhny Novgorod of the Kontinental Hockey League (KHL) on December 8, 2020. Terry made 19 regular season appearances with Torpedo, registering 8 goals and 8 assists for 16 points.

Following a first-round exit in the post-season, Terry returned to North America as a free agent and was signed to a one-year AHL contract with the Bridgeport Islanders, affiliate to the New York Islanders on August 3, 2021.

Leading Bridgeport in scoring in his two year tenure with the club, Terry left as a free agent and was signed to a one-year contract with independent AHL club, the Chicago Wolves, for the 2023–24 season on July 10, 2023.

== International play ==
Terry represents Canada internationally in inline hockey.

== Charity involvement ==
In 2018, Terry launched the "Chris ALS All-star" program. As part of this program, Terry awarded two people living with ALS tickets to a Laval Rockets home game and a personal meet-and-greet.

== Career statistics ==
=== Regular season and playoffs ===
			Regular season					Playoffs
Season	Team	League	GP	G	A	Pts	PIM	GP	G	A	Pts	PIM
2005–06	Plymouth Whalers	OHL	64	9	19	28	72	11	3	2	5	4
2006–07	Plymouth Whalers	OHL	68	22	44	66	98	20	8	10	18	21
2007–08	Plymouth Whalers	OHL	68	44	57	101	107	4	4	3	7	6
2007–08	Albany River Rats	AHL	1	0	0	0	0	—	—	—	—	—
2008–09	Plymouth Whalers	OHL	53	39	55	94	75	11	7	9	16	18
2009–10	Albany River Rats	AHL	80	17	30	47	47	8	2	4	6	0
2010–11	Charlotte Checkers	AHL	80	34	30	64	52	16	6	3	9	14
2011–12	Charlotte Checkers	AHL	74	16	43	59	67	—	—	—	—	—
2012–13	Charlotte Checkers	AHL	70	25	35	60	40	5	2	2	4	8
2012–13	Carolina Hurricanes	NHL	3	1	0	1	0	—	—	—	—	—
2013–14	Charlotte Checkers	AHL	70	28	41	69	62	—	—	—	—	—
2013–14	Carolina Hurricanes	NHL	10	0	2	2	0	—	—	—	—	—
2014–15	Carolina Hurricanes	NHL	57	11	9	20	14	—	—	—	—	—
2014–15	Charlotte Checkers	AHL	5	1	1	2	4	—	—	—	—	—
2015–16	Carolina Hurricanes	NHL	68	8	3	11	16	—	—	—	—	—
2016–17	St. John's IceCaps	AHL	58	30	38	68	36	4	1	0	1	4
2016–17	Montreal Canadiens	NHL	14	2	2	4	4	—	—	—	—	—
2017–18	Laval Rocket	AHL	62	32	39	71	45	—	—	—	—	—
2018–19	Grand Rapids Griffins	AHL	69	29	32	61	38	5	1	1	2	2
2019–20	Grand Rapids Griffins	AHL	57	21	30	51	32	—	—	—	—	—
2020–21	Torpedo Nizhny Novgorod	KHL	19	8	8	16	4	4	0	1	1	0
2021–22	Bridgeport Islanders	AHL	61	30	31	61	62	6	2	4	6	4
2022–23	Bridgeport Islanders	AHL	67	27	51	78	72	—	—	—	—	—
2023–24	Chicago Wolves	AHL	61	21	29	50	37	—	—	—	—	—
2024–25	Bridgeport Islanders	AHL	68	19	47	66	57	—	—	—	—	—
2025–26	Bridgeport Islanders	AHL	56	10	11	21	21	1	0	0	0	0
AHL totals			939	340	488	828	672	45	14	14	28	32
NHL totals			152	22	16	38	34	—	—	—	—	—

=== International ===
Year	Team	Event	Result	GP	G	A	Pts	PIM
2006	Canada Ontario	U17	5th	5	5	1	6	4
Junior totals				5	5	1	6	4

== Awards and honours ==
Award	Year
OHL
Mickey Renaud Captain's Trophy	2008–09
Dan Snyder Memorial Trophy	2008–09
AHL
AHL Leading Scorer	2017–18
All-Star Game participant	2017–18
Laval Rocket AHL Man of the Year	2017–18
AHL First All-Star team	2017–18
