= Scott Fletcher (ice hockey) =

American ice hockey player

- Born: January 12, 1988 (age 37); Waterford, Michigan, U.S.
- Height: 6 ft 2 in (188 cm)
- Weight: 198 lb (90 kg; 14 st 2 lb)
- Position: Defense
- Shot: Right
- Played for: AHL; Providence Bruins; ECHL; Reading Royals; Toledo Walleye; Florida Everblades; Trenton Titans
- NHL draft: Undrafted
- Playing career: 2009–2012

Scott Fletcher (born January 12, 1988) is an American former professional ice hockey defenseman. He most recently played with the Trenton Titans of the ECHL during the 2011–12 season.

== Early life ==
Fletcher was born in Waterford, Michigan and grew up in Haslett, Michigan. He played minor hockey for the West Michigan Warriors and Honeybaked AAA Hockey Club in Oak Park, Michigan.

== Career ==
In 2004, Fletcher was drafted by the Saginaw Spirit in the second round (22nd overall) of the Ontario Hockey League Priority Selection. Before turning pro, he spent time with the Saginaw Spirit, Tri-City Storm of the USHL, Mississauga IceDogs, Niagara IceDogs, and Plymouth Whalers.

== Career statistics ==
			Regular season					Playoffs
Season	Team	League	GP	G	A	Pts	PIM	GP	G	A	Pts	PIM
2004–05	Saginaw Spirit	OHL	50	0	2	2	72	—	—	—	—	—
2005–06	Saginaw Spirit	OHL	62	1	1	2	215	4	0	0	0	6
2006–07	Saginaw Spirit	OHL	6	0	0	0	7	—	—	—	—	—
2006–07	Tri-City Storm	USHL	14	2	2	4	56	—	—	—	—	—
2006–07	Mississauga IceDogs	OHL	19	0	2	2	69	4	0	0	0	8
2007–08	Niagara IceDogs	OHL	44	0	1	1	53	6	0	0	0	2
2008–09	Niagara IceDogs	OHL	20	0	3	3	45	—	—	—	—	—
2008–09	Plymouth Whalers	OHL	35	1	4	5	71	11	0	0	0	32
2009–10	Providence Bruins	AHL	14	0	0	0	32	—	—	—	—	—
2009–10	Reading Royals	ECHL	30	2	4	6	74	8	0	0	0	6
2010–11	Toledo Walleye	ECHL	57	2	12	14	179	—	—	—	—	—
2011–12	Toledo Walleye	ECHL	5	0	0	0	11	—	—	—	—	—
2011–12	Florida Everblades	ECHL	27	0	1	1	58	—	—	—	—	—
2011–12	Trenton Titans	ECHL	7	0	0	0	19	—	—	—	—	—
AHL totals			14	0	0	0	32	—	—	—	—	—
ECHL totals			126	4	17	21	341	8	0	0	0	6
