= Plymouth Whalers =

- City: Plymouth, Michigan
- League: Ontario Hockey League
- Conference: Western
- Division: West
- Operated: 1997–2015
- Home arena: Compuware Arena
- Colors: Navy blue, white, green and silver

Franchise history
- 1990–1992: Detroit Compuware Ambassadors
- 1992–1995: Detroit Junior Red Wings
- 1995–1997: Detroit Whalers
- 1997–2015: Plymouth Whalers
- 2015–present: Flint Firebirds

The Plymouth Whalers were a major junior ice hockey team in the Ontario Hockey League. They played out of Compuware Arena in Plymouth, Michigan, United States, a suburb of Detroit until 2015 when they were relocated to Flint, Michigan.

== History ==
The Whalers can trace their roots back to the 1990–91 Detroit Compuware Ambassadors as an expansion team in the OHL. Since then the franchise has also been called the Detroit Junior Red Wings and the Detroit Whalers. In 1997 they were officially renamed the "Plymouth Whalers" after the local municipality gave generous tax breaks to the team and venue. The franchise was owned until 2015 by Peter Karmanos, who also owned the NHL's Carolina Hurricanes (formerly the Hartford Whalers, from which the OHL team's name was taken).

The Plymouth Whalers and Saginaw Spirit line up for a faceoff at the Compuware Arena.

Plymouth is one of only two teams to win 5 consecutive division titles (West division from 1999 to 2003), the other team being the Ottawa 67's (East division from 1996 to 2000). Plymouth has made the playoffs 23 consecutive seasons, since the 1991–92 season. The Whalers reached the OHL finals two consecutive seasons in 1999–2000, and 2000–01, losing to the Barrie Colts and Ottawa 67's. These seasons included future NHLers David Legwand, Justin Williams, Robert Esche, and Stephen Weiss.

Celebrating their 10th Anniversary playing at the Compuware Arena during the 2005–06 season, all current Whalers players had been brought into the system by head coach and general manager Mike Vellucci. This created the build-up for the next year. Headed by overage captain John Vigilante, the team's rookies in 2003 and 2004 came to fruition in James Neal, Dan Collins, and Tommy Sestito. Vellucci acquired the Belleville Bulls' leading scorer Evan Brophey and the Toronto St. Michael's Majors goaltender Justin Peters, who had an extensive resume. On the last game of the season, the Whalers played the Saginaw Spirit, with the division title on the line, in what has been proven to be one of the most exciting OHL games in recent history. With the Whalers' 2–0 lead going into the third period, the Spirit fought back and managed the tying goal just before time expired. However, Brophey scored in overtime to clinch the Whalers' 9th division title.

During the 2006–07 season, rookie goaltenders Jeremy Smith and Michal Neuvirth, combined for the lowest goals against average in the OHL, with only 173 goals against in total. The Whalers had a number of high prospects signed or drafted by NHL teams, including former Wayne Gretzky 99 Award winner Daniel Ryder, who was acquired, with him already having been signed with the Calgary Flames. After a very inconsistent start, the team improved to fall short of the London Knights by one point for the Hamilton Spectator Trophy. During the second half of the season and through the playoffs, the Whalers featured a 23-game winning streak at home, lasting three and a half months, falling at Game 4 of the Western Conference Finals to London. The Whalers, although seeded #2, easily won the Wayne Gretzky Trophy as Western Conference playoff champion, sweeping #7 Guelph, and winning in 5 against both #3 Kitchener and #1 London. In the final, the Whalers defeated the Sudbury Wolves in six games to win the J. Ross Robertson Cup, thus earning the right to represent the OHL in the 2007 Memorial Cup.

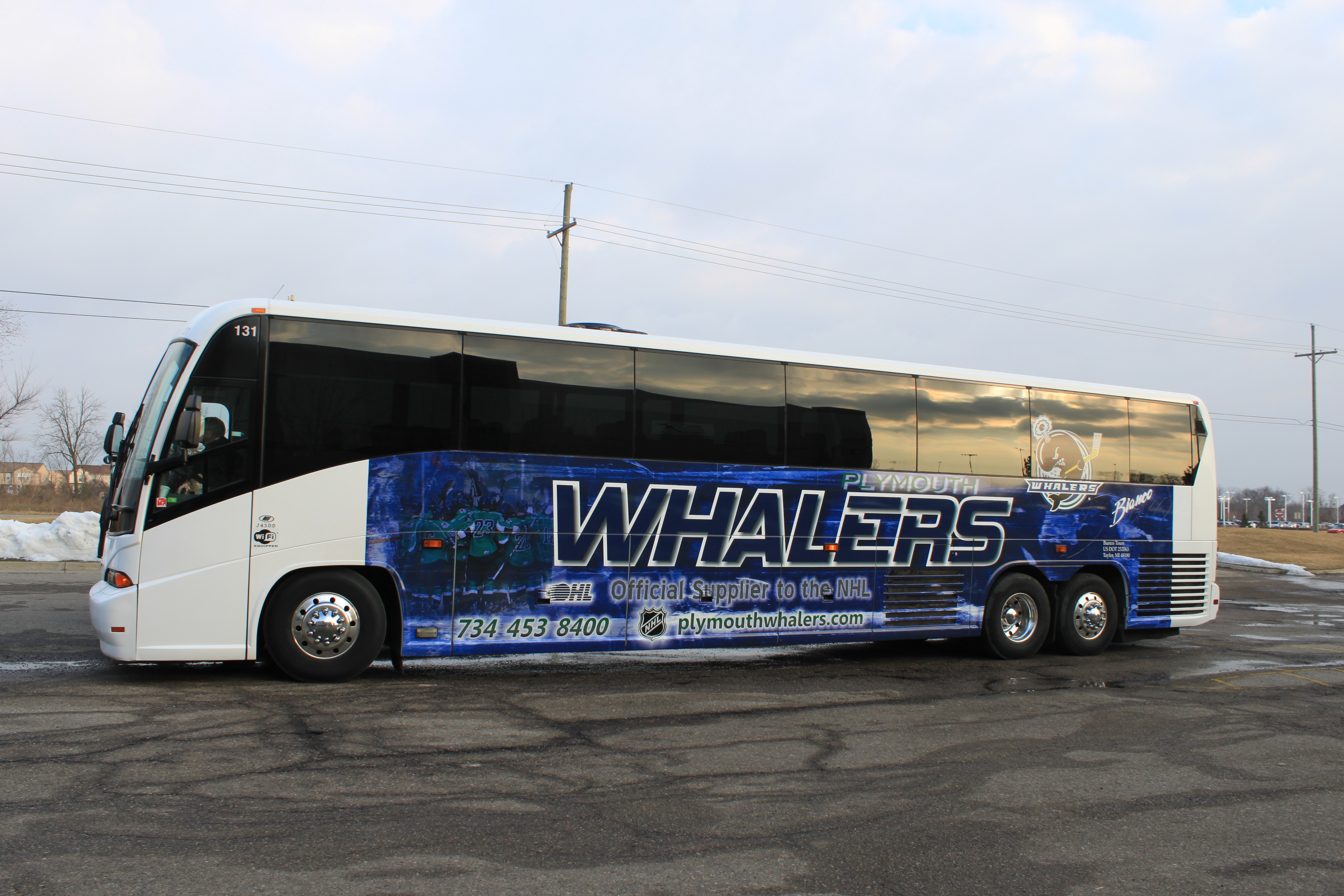
Plymouth Whalers team bus

In the Memorial Cup, the team suffered a rough start, losing to the Vancouver Giants 4–3 in overtime on May 18, and again to the Medicine Hat Tigers 4–1 on May 21. Their fortunes would change, however, on May 22, when they would defeat the Lewiston Maineiacs 2–1 in overtime, thus putting them in the tiebreaker game on May 24, in which they would defeat Lewiston again, 5–1, eliminating the Maineiacs from the Memorial Cup and advancing to the semifinal. However, on May 25, the Whalers would lose again to the Vancouver Giants in the semifinal round, this time in dramatic fashion by a score of 8–1. This way, the Whalers finished the 2007 Memorial Cup in third place.

During the 2007–08 season, the Whalers dealt the goaltender that led them to their 2007 OHL Championship, Michal Neuvirth, early to make room for Jeremy Smith to start. Neuvirth was among 12 players that left/were traded from that team, leaving the team looking to a number of young players for leadership. Chris Terry led the team in scoring and was helped by overage captain Andrew Fournier and up-and-comer AJ Jenks. In mid-December 2007, President and GM Mike Vellucci left his head coaching position for Greg Stefan. A late season injury to overage defenseman Wes Cunningham hampered the flow of the team, leading to an early playoff exit at the hands of the eventual OHL champions, the Kitchener Rangers.

Early in the 2008–09 season, Stefan was recalled to the Hurricanes, where Mike Vellucci came back to fill the head coaching role. Injuries and inconsistency plagued the team, as they fell to dead last in the league. After the coaching change, as well as key trades, including a short lived experiment with Cory McGillis, then-leading scorer Matt Caria from the Greyhounds, Scott Fletcher from the Ice Dogs, and the return from AHL-playing Brett Bellemore, the team saw a turn around by Christmas putting them back into the middle of the pack. At the deadline, as a result of Bellemore's return and the emergence of Matt Hackett as the new starting goaltender, Patrick Lee and Jeremy Smith were traded to Niagara for draft picks.

The 2009–10 season saw the Whalers led by league MVP Tyler Seguin along with other top scorers such as Myles McCauley.

On December 29, 2013, the Whalers and the London Knights broke the newly set Canadian Hockey League attendance record. The Knights and Whalers, playing in the second OHL game of the evening outdoors at Comerica Park in Detroit, Michigan (also the second outdoor game ever played in the OHL), played in front of 26,384 spectators. The Whalers won the game 2–1 in a shootout.

On January 14, 2015, owner Peter Karmanos announced that the Whalers would be relocated to Flint, Michigan after a sale of the team to the owner of Flint's Perani Arena and Event Center for the 2015–16 season. The OHL approved the sale, and the relocated franchise is named the Flint Firebirds. On March 15, the Whalers missed the playoffs for the only time. Six days later on March 21, the Plymouth Whalers played their final game in franchise history losing 5–1 to the Erie Otters.

== Championships ==
The Plymouth Whalers have won eight divisional titles, five of them consecutively. Plymouth has also won three Hamilton Spectator trophies and reached the OHL Championship Finals three times, winning during the 2006–07 season.

J. Ross Robertson Cup
OHL Champion

- 1999–2000 Finalists vs. Barrie Colts
- 2000–01 Finalists vs. Ottawa 67's
- 2006–07 Champions vs. Sudbury Wolves

Wayne Gretzky Trophy
Western Conference Playoff Champion

- 1999–2000, 2000–01 and 2006–07

Hamilton Spectator Trophy
Season Champion

- 1998–99 51 wins, 4 ties, 106 pts
- 1999–2000 45 wins, 4 ties, 1 OTL, 95 pts
- 2001–02 39 wins, 12 ties, 2 OTL, 92 pts

Bumbacco Trophy
West Division Champion

- 1998–99, 1999–2000, 2000–01, 2001–02, 2002–03, 2005–06, 2006–07, 2011–12, 2012-13

== Coaches ==
- 1995–01 Peter DeBoer (6 seasons) - DeBoer was promoted from assistant coach to become coach & general manager of the Whalers organization in 1995. DeBoer was twice voted the OHL Coach of the Year, winning the Matt Leyden Trophy in the 1998–99 and 1999–2000 seasons. DeBoer left to coach the Kitchener Rangers.
- mid-2007-mid-2008 Greg Stefan (2 seasons) - Stefan began his coaching career in 1993 with the Detroit Junior Red Wings. He served as an assistant coach in Plymouth until 1998, and re-joined the Whalers as director of player development and assistant coach in 2003. Named head coach during the 2007–08 season when Vellucci moved to focus on the front office, Stefan left the Whalers in the middle of the 2008–09 season to take a scouting job with the Carolina Hurricanes.
- 2001-mid-2007; mid-2008–pres Mike Vellucci (8th season) - Vellucci was promoted to President of the Plymouth Whalers in 2000 and was appointed the team's general manager and head coach in 2001. In 2007, Vellucci won the Matt Leyden Trophy as Ontario Hockey League Coach of the Year - the first American ever to win the award. Vellucci stepped down in the middle of the 2007–08 season to focus on his GM position. He returned as head coach of the club in the middle of the 2008–09 season with Stefan's moving to the Hurricanes.

== Players ==
=== Retired numbers ===
14 - Pat Peake is the only number retired by the Whalers organization. Peake (who played in the Junior Red Wings era) was a two-season captain, the first MVP for the franchise in 1992–93, as well as Canadian Hockey League player of the year, and OHL Most Sportsmanlike player of the year. He has the most career points in franchise history.

=== Team captains ===
- 1990–91 Paul Mitton
- 1991 Mark Lawrence (traded)
- 1991–93 Pat Peake
- 1993–95 Jamie Allison
- 1995–96 Bryan Berard
- 1996–97 Mike Morrone
- 1997–98 Andrew Taylor
- 1998–00 Randy Fitzgerald
- 2000–02 Jared Newman
- 2002–03 Nate Kiser
- 2003–04 James Wisniewski
- 2004–05 Tim Sestito (home) & John Mitchell (away & playoffs)
- 2005–06 John Vigilante
- 2006–07 Steve Ward
- 2007–08 Andrew Fournier (home & playoffs) & Chris Terry (away)
- 2008–09 Chris Terry
- 2009–10 AJ Jenks
- 2010–12 Beau Schmitz
- 2012–13 Colin MacDonald
- 2013–14 Nick Malysa
- 2014–15 Alex Peters

=== Award winners ===
- 1997–98 - David Legwand: Canadian Hockey League Rookie of the Year, Emms Family Award OHL Rookie of the Year, Red Tilson Trophy Most Outstanding Player of the Year
- 1998–99 - Robert Holsinger & Rob Zepp: Dave Pinkney Trophy Lowest Team GAA
- 1998–99 - Rob Zepp: Canadian Hockey League Scholastic Player of the Year, Bobby Smith Trophy OHL Scholastic Player of the Year
- 1999–2000 - Rob Zepp and Bill Ruggiero: Dave Pinkney Trophy Lowest Team GAA
- 2000–01 - Rob Zepp and Paul Drew: Dave Pinkney Trophy Lowest Team GAA
- 2001–02 - Jason Bacashihua and Paul Drew: Dave Pinkney Trophy Lowest Team GAA
- 2001–02 - Jason Bacashihua: F.W. 'Dinty' Moore Trophy Best Rookie GAA
- 2002–03 - Chad LaRose: Leo Lalonde Memorial Trophy Overage Player of the Year
- 2002–03 - Paul Drew and Jeff Weber: Dave Pinkney Trophy Lowest Team GAA
- 2003–04 - James Wisniewski: Canadian Hockey League Defenceman of the Year, Max Kaminsky Trophy OHL Defenceman of the Year
- 2006–07 - Michal Neuvirth & Jeremy Smith: Dave Pinkney Trophy Lowest Team GAA
- 2006–07 - Michal Neuvirth: F.W. 'Dinty' Moore Trophy Best Rookie GAA
- 2008–09 - Chris Terry: Mickey Renaud Captain's Trophy Captain of the Year
- 2008–09 - Chris Terry: Dan Snyder Memorial Trophy OHL Humanitarian of the Year
- 2009–10 - Ryan Hayes: Dan Snyder Memorial Trophy OHL Humanitarian of the Year
- 2009–10 - Ryan Hayes: Canadian Hockey League Humanitarian of the Year
- 2009–10 - Tyler Seguin: Eddie Powers Memorial Trophy Most Points in the OHL
- 2009–10 - Tyler Seguin: Red Tilson Trophy OHL Most Outstanding Player of the Year
- 2009–10 - Tyler Seguin: Canadian Hockey League Top Prospect
- 2012-13 - Vincent Trocheck: Eddie Powers Memorial Trophy Most Points in the OHL
- 2012-13 - Alex Nedeljkovic: F.W. 'Dinty' Moore Trophy Best Rookie GAA
- 2013-14 - Alex Nedeljkovic: OHL Goaltender of the Year

== Notable players ==
=== First round NHL entry draft picks ===
Players who were drafted in the first round of the NHL entry draft while playing for the Whalers franchise.

- 1991: Pat Peake, 14th overall, Washington Capitals
- 1993: Todd Harvey, 9th overall, Dallas Stars
- 1995: Bryan Berard, 1st overall, Ottawa Senators
- 1998: David Legwand, 2nd overall, Nashville Predators
- 2000: Justin Williams, 28th overall, Philadelphia Flyers
- 2001: Stephen Weiss, 4th overall, Florida Panthers
- 2010: Tyler Seguin, 2nd overall, Boston Bruins
- 2011: Stefan Noesen, 21st overall, Ottawa Senators
- 2011: Rickard Rakell, 30th overall, Anaheim Ducks
- 2012: Tom Wilson, 16th overall, Washington Capitals
- 2013: Ryan Hartman, 30th overall, Chicago Blackhawks

=== NHL alumni ===
List of Plymouth Whalers alumni who have played in the National Hockey League.

- Jamie Allison
- Yuri Babenko
- Jason Bacashihua
- Brett Bellemore
- Bryan Berard
- Will Bitten
- Jared Boll
- Jesse Boulerice
- Fred Brathwaite
- Evan Brophey
- Kevin Brown
- Eric Cairns
- Gregory Campbell
- Connor Carrick
- Jamie Devane
- Harold Druken
- Robert Esche
- Matt Hackett
- Todd Harvey
- Sean Haggerty
- Cole Jarrett
- Michal Jordan
- Tomas Kurka
- Chad LaRose
- Mark Lawrence
- David Legwand
- David Liffiton
- Paul Mara
- Eric Manlow
- Philip McRae
- Sonny Milano
- J. T. Miller
- Mike Minard
- John Mitchell
- James Neal
- Alex Nedeljkovic
- Michal Neuvirth
- Stefan Noesen
- Pat Peake
- Justin Peters
- Rickard Rakell
- Keith Redmond
- Mike Rucinski
- Tyler Seguin
- Tim Sestito
- Tom Sestito
- Karl Stewart
- Damian Surma
- Chris Terry
- Chris Thorburn
- Vincent Trocheck
- Nikos Tselios
- Kris Vernarsky
- Jason Ward
- Scott Wedgewood
- Stephen Weiss
- Derek Wilkinson
- Justin Williams
- Tom Wilson
- Chad Wiseman
- James Wisniewski
- Bob Wren
- Rob Zepp

== Season-by-season results ==
Legend: GP = Games played, W = Wins, L = Losses, T = Ties, OTL = Overtime losses, SL = Shoot-out losses, Pts = Points, GF = Goals for, GA = Goals against

Memorial Cup champions	OHL champions	OHL finalists

Season	GP	W	L	T	OTL	SL	Pts	Win %	GF	GA	Standing	Playoffs
1997–98	66	37	22	7	—	—	81	0.614	279	223	2nd West	Won first-round (Sarnia Sting) 4–1; Won quarter-final (Belleville Bulls) 4–2; Lost semi-final (Guelph Storm) 4–0
1998–99	68	51	13	4	—	—	106	0.779	313	162	1st West	Won conference quarter-final (Windsor Spitfires) 4–0; Lost conference semi-final (London Knights) 4–3
1999–2000	68	45	18	4	1	—	95	0.699	256	172	1st West	Won conference quarter-final (Guelph Storm) 4–2; Won conference semi-final (Windsor Spitfires) 4–1; Won conference final (Sault Ste. Marie Greyhounds) 4–1; Lost OHL championship (Barrie Colts) 4–3
2000–01	68	43	15	5	5	—	96	0.706	253	162	1st West	Won conference quarter-final (Sarnia Sting) 4–0; Won conference semi-final (Windsor Spitfires) 4–0; Won conference final (Erie Otters) 4–1; Lost OHL championship (Ottawa 67's) 4–2
2001–02	68	39	15	12	2	—	92	0.676	249	166	1st West	Lost conference quarter-final (London Knights) 4–2
2002–03	68	43	14	9	2	—	97	0.713	259	174	1st West	Won conference quarter-final (Owen Sound Attack) 4–0; Won conference semi-final (London Knights) 4–3; Lost conference final (Kitchener Rangers) 4–3
2003–04	68	32	24	9	3	—	76	0.559	220	204	2nd West	Won conference quarter-final (Kitchener Rangers) 4–1; Lost conference semi-final (Guelph Storm) 4–0
2004–05	68	30	29	6	3	—	69	0.507	198	204	2nd West	Lost conference quarter-final (Owen Sound Attack) 4–0
2005–06	68	35	28	—	1	4	75	0.551	227	224	1st West	Won conference quarter-final (Windsor Spitfires) 4–3; Lost conference semi-final (Guelph Storm) 4–2
2006–07	68	49	14	—	2	3	103	0.757	299	173	1st West	Won conference quarter-final (Guelph Storm) 4–0; Won conference semi-final (Kitchener Rangers) 4–1; Won conference final (London Knights) 4–1; Won OHL championship (Sudbury Wolves) 4–2; Tied for 3rd place in Memorial Cup round-robin Won tie-breaker (Lewiston Maineiacs) 5–1; Lost semi-final (Vancouver Giants) 8–1
2007–08	68	34	28	—	2	4	74	0.544	228	223	5th West	Lost conference quarter-final (Kitchener Rangers) 4–0
2008–09	68	37	26	—	5	0	79	0.581	224	218	2nd West	Won conference quarter-final (Sarnia Sting) 4–1; Lost conference semi-final (Windsor Spitfires) 4–2
2009–10	68	38	27	—	1	2	79	0.581	245	201	2nd West	Won conference quarter-final (Sault Ste. Marie Greyhounds) 4–1; Lost conference semi-final (Windsor Spitfires) 4–0
2010–11	68	36	26	—	2	4	78	0.574	249	219	3rd West	Won conference quarter-final (Kitchener Rangers) 4–3; Lost conference semi-final (Owen Sound Attack) 4–0
2011–12	68	47	18	—	2	1	97	0.713	279	205	1st West	Won conference quarter-final (Guelph Storm) 4–2; Lost conference semi-final (Kitchener Rangers) 4–3
2012–13	68	42	17	—	4	4	93	0.684	292	202	1st West	Won conference quarter-final (Sarnia Sting) 4–0; Won conference semi-final (Owen Sound Attack) 4–2; Lost conference final (London Knights) 4–1
2013–14	68	28	33	—	0	7	63	0.463	187	238	4th West	Lost conference quarter-final (Guelph Storm) 4–1
2014–15	68	23	38	—	5	2	53	0.390	195	255	4th West	did not qualify

== Uniforms and logos ==
The uniform history of the Plymouth Whalers

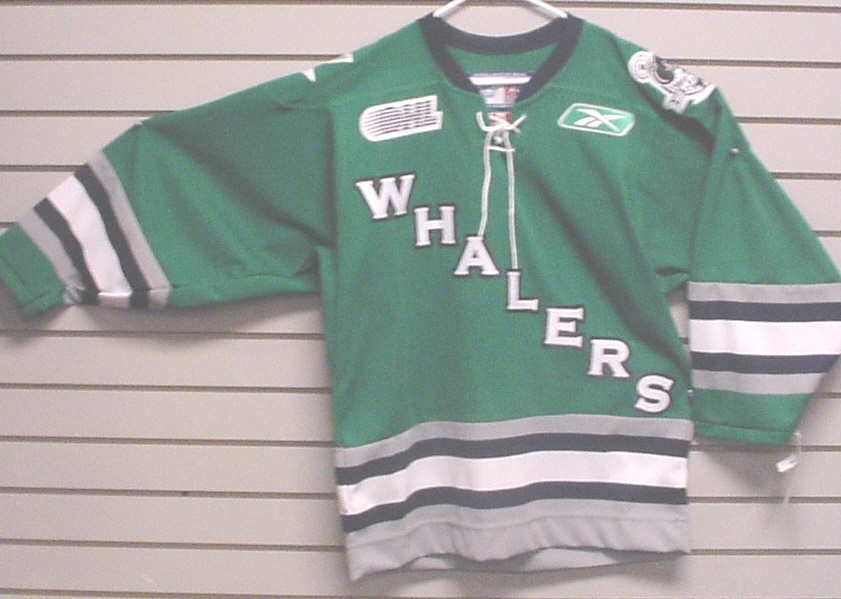
Plymouth Whalers third jersey.

In 2009 all Canadian Hockey League teams came out with new Reebok EDGE Jerseys

The Plymouth Whaler logo featured an angry hockey stick-wielding whale, blowing a puck and spout of water out its blow hole. The name Whalers was superimposed on the image surround by a circle of green and blue with waves in the background.

The Whalers' white jersey had the whaler logo in the center with 3 even stripes on the sleeves and bottom of the jersey. The stripes are evenly spaced with two navy outer lines and one green inner line. The Whalers' blue jersey had the Whalers logo in the center with a white space and green space going down the sleeves. A third jersey was green with "WHALERS" written diagonally down the front.

== Mascot ==
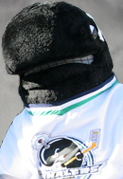
Shooter the Whale

The Plymouth Whalers had a mascot named Shooter. His first game appearance was on December 11, 2003 against the Peterborough Petes.

== Arena ==
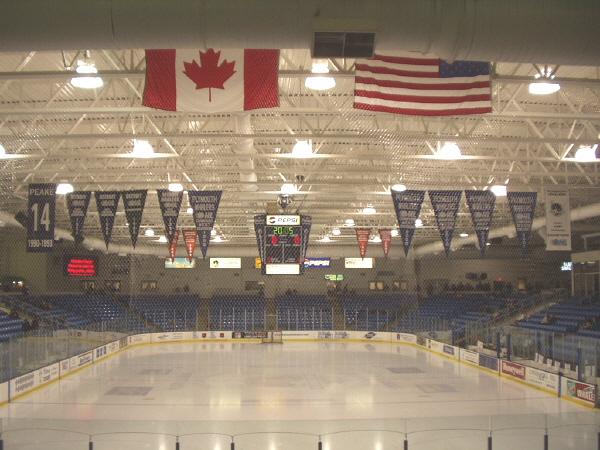
Interior of Compuware Arena

Peter Karmanos arranged to build the Whalers a new home in Plymouth Township, Michigan as soon as the 1995–96 season ended. The Compuware Arena was constructed in six months' time, ready for the 1996–97 season, with a seating capacity of 3,807. In addition to the NHL-sized rink, there is an Olympic sized rink also in the building.
