= John Kurtz =

Canadian ice hockey player

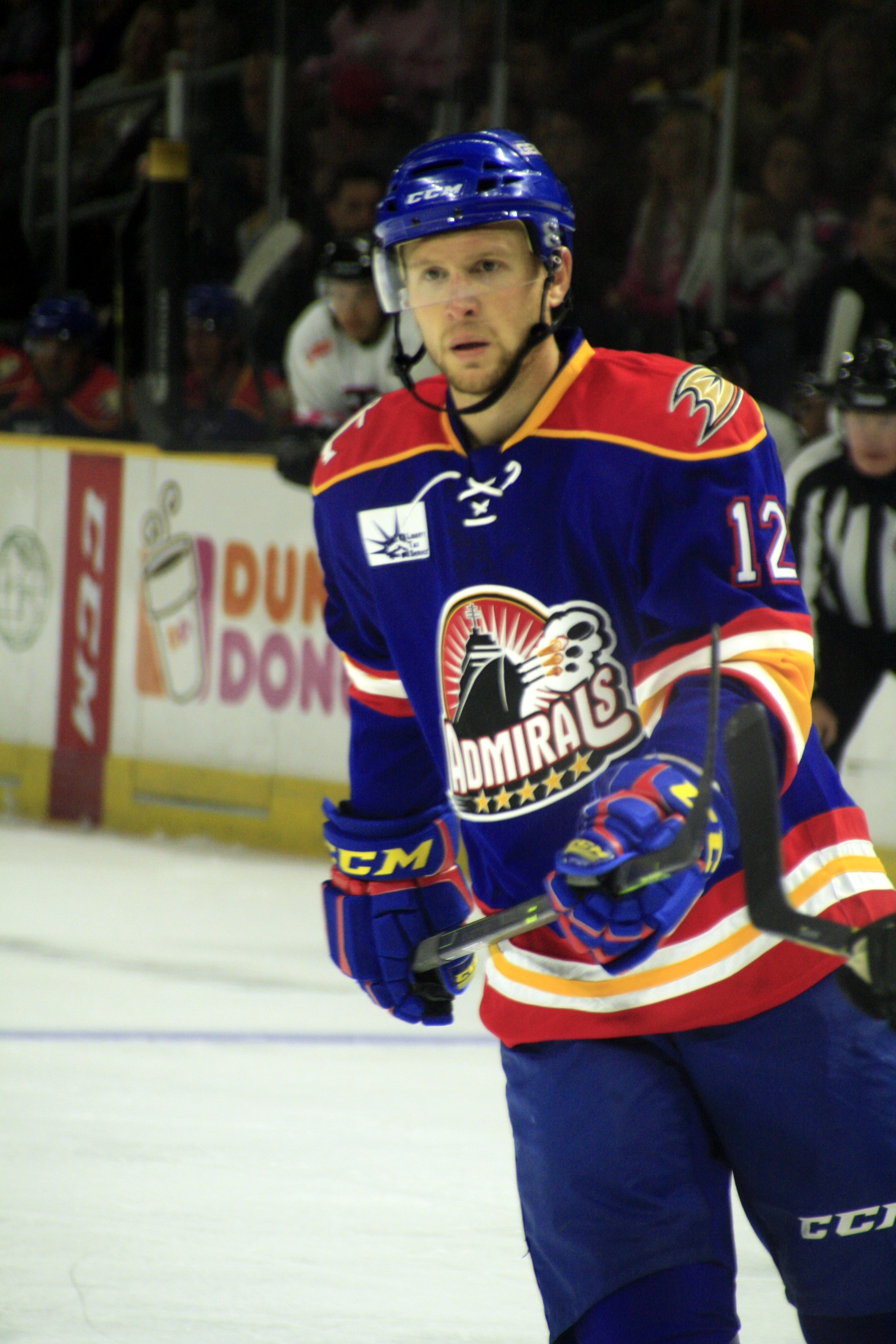
- Kurtz with the Norfolk Admirals in 2014
- Born: May 16, 1989 (age 37) Oakville, Ontario, Canada
- Height: 6 ft 2 in (188 cm)
- Weight: 209 lb (95 kg; 14 st 13 lb)
- Position: Left wing
- Shot: Left
- Played for: Norfolk Admirals; Utica Comets; Toronto Marlies; Syracuse Crunch; Belfast Giants
- NHL draft: Undrafted
- Playing career: 2010–2018

John Kurtz (born May 16, 1989) is a Canadian former professional ice hockey forward. He last played for the Belfast Giants in the Elite Ice Hockey League (EIHL).

== Playing career ==
Before turning professional, Kurtz played four seasons of major junior hockey in the Ontario Hockey League with the Windsor Spitfires and Sudbury Wolves. For his play during the 2009–10 OHL season, Kurtz was unanimously selected to receive the Mickey Renaud Captain's Trophy as the “OHL team captain that best exemplifies leadership on and off the ice, with a passion and dedication to the game of hockey and his community”.

Immediately following the conclusion of his final OHL season, Kurtz began his professional career with the Syracuse Crunch, joining the AHL team for their closing games of the 2009–10 AHL season. Kurtz was later signed to a one-year entry-level contract with NHL affiliate, the Anaheim Ducks on April 10, 2013.

After two seasons within the Ducks organization, Kurtz left as a free agent and later accepted an invitation to the Vancouver Canucks training camp on a professional try-out contract on September 11, 2015. On February 23, 2016, Kurtz signed a professional tryout contract with the Toronto Marlies of the AHL, where he played out the season with 4 points in 14 games.

Un-signed over the following summer, Kurtz belatedly signed a contract for the 2016–17 season, in agreeing to a return with the Norfolk Admirals, now of the ECHL, on November 10, 2016. He appeared in 26 games with 14 points before he was signed to a professional try-out deal in a second stint with the Syracuse Crunch. On March 18, 2017, Kurtz was signed by the Crunch to a standard playing contract for the remainder of the campaign.

On 30 August 2017, Kurtz agreed to move to the Belfast Giants on a one-year deal.

== Career statistics ==
			Regular season					Playoffs
Season	Team	League	GP	G	A	Pts	PIM	GP	G	A	Pts	PIM
2005–06	Burlington Cougars	OPJHL	42	7	11	18	34	—	—	—	—	—
2006–07	Windsor Spitfires	OHL	58	8	7	15	31	—	—	—	—	—
2007–08	Sudbury Wolves	AHL	63	12	16	28	41	—	—	—	—	—
2008–09	Sudbury Wolves	AHL	68	21	33	54	44	6	1	1	2	2
2009–10	Sudbury Wolves	OHL	62	30	16	46	59	4	0	1	1	2
2009–10	Syracuse Crunch	AHL	6	1	0	1	7	—	—	—	—	—
2010–11	Syracuse Crunch	AHL	49	4	2	6	102	—	—	—	—	—
2010–11	Elmira Jackals	ECHL	8	1	2	3	0	—	—	—	—	—
2011–12	Syracuse Crunch	AHL	12	1	0	1	40	—	—	—	—	—
2011–12	Elmira Jackals	ECHL	19	3	5	8	30	—	—	—	—	—
2012–13	Norfolk Admirals	AHL	59	3	5	8	103	—	—	—	—	—
2013–14	Norfolk Admirals	AHL	73	5	7	12	112	9	1	0	1	9
2014–15	Norfolk Admirals	AHL	72	4	5	9	188	—	—	—	—	—
2015–16	Utica Comets	AHL	25	2	0	2	38	—	—	—	—	—
2015–16	Toronto Marlies	AHL	14	1	3	4	0	—	—	—	—	—
2016–17	Norfolk Admirals	ECHL	26	4	10	14	25	—	—	—	—	—
2016–17	Syracuse Crunch	AHL	17	5	1	6	31	—	—	—	—	—
2017–18	Belfast Giants	EIHL	49	12	14	26	33	2	0	1	1	0
AHL totals			327	26	23	49	621	9	1	0	1	9

== Awards and honours ==
Award	Year
OHL
Mickey Renaud Captain's Trophy	2009–10
