= Tim Sestito =

American ice hockey player (born 1984)

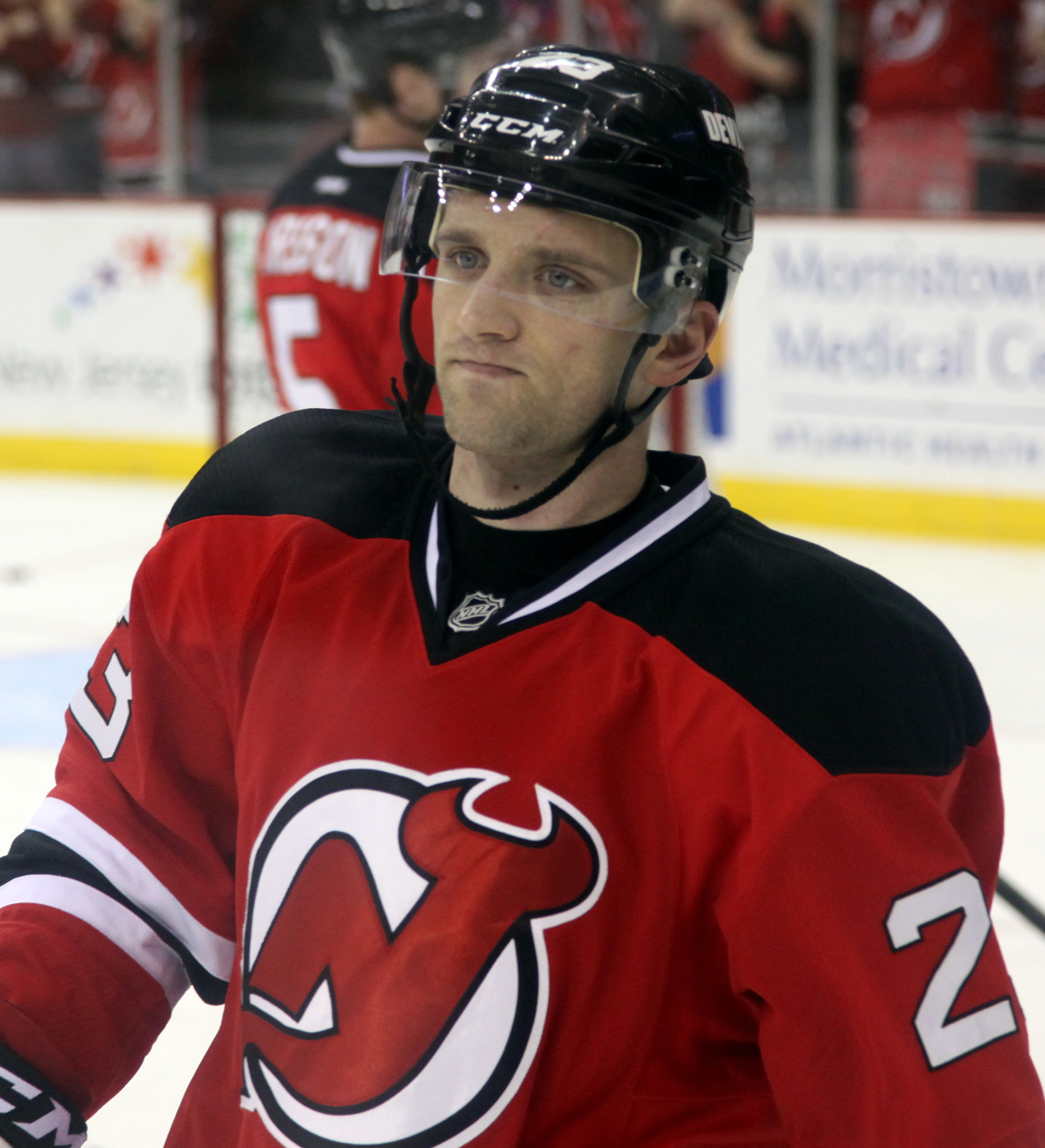
- Born: August 28, 1984 (age 41) Rome, New York, U.S.
- Height: 5 ft 11 in (180 cm)
- Weight: 195 lb (88 kg; 13 st 13 lb)
- Position: Center
- Shot: Left
- Played for: Edmonton Oilers; New Jersey Devils; Dinamo Riga
- NHL draft: Undrafted
- Playing career: 2005–2017

Tim Sestito (born August 28, 1984) is an American former professional ice hockey player who played with the Edmonton Oilers and New Jersey Devils organizations of the National Hockey League (NHL). His younger brother Tom Sestito most recently played for the Toronto Marlies in the American Hockey League (AHL).

== Playing career ==
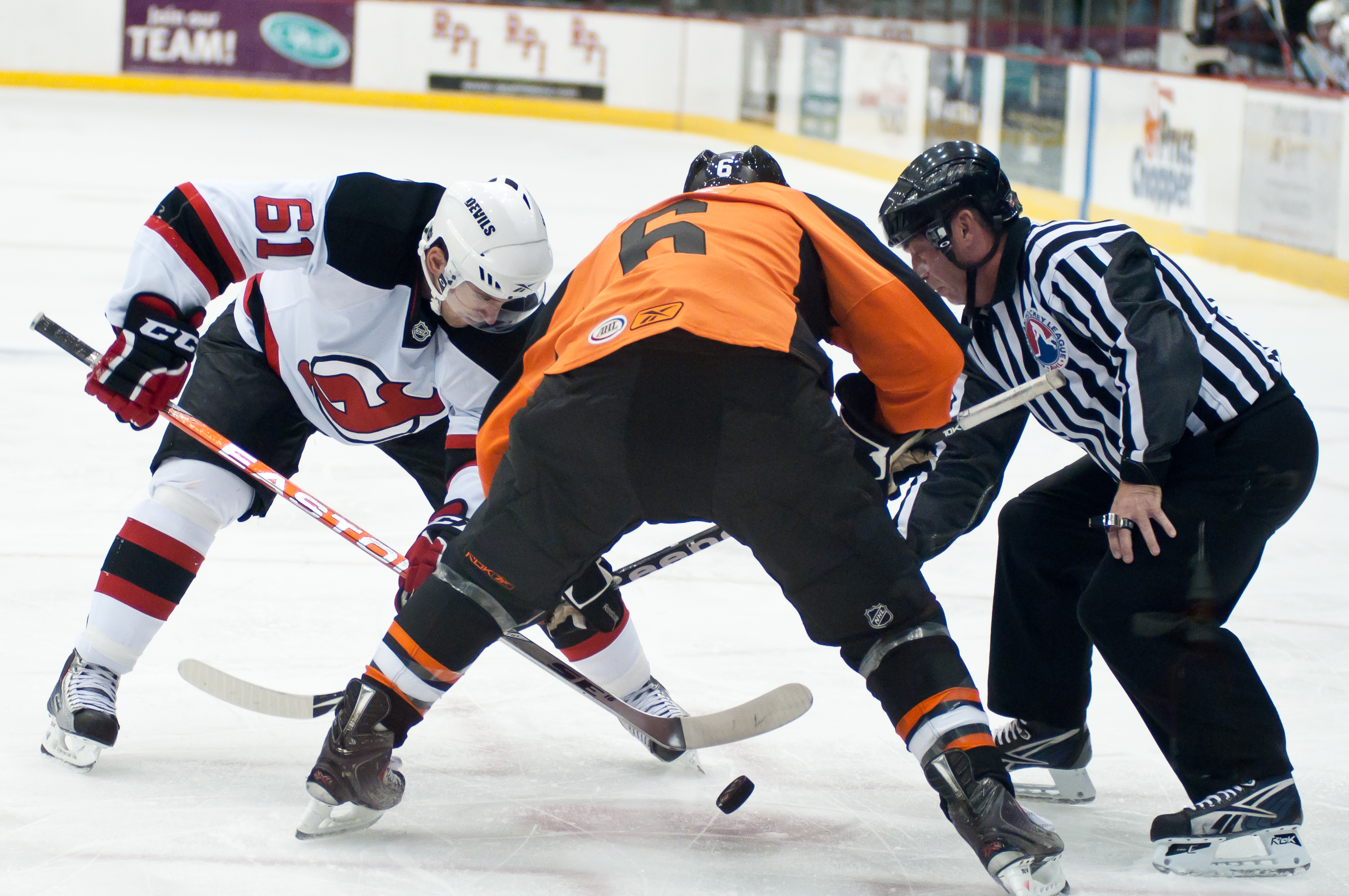
Sestito takes a faceoff for the Albany Devils.

Undrafted, Sesito played junior hockey with the Plymouth Whalers in the Ontario Hockey League. In 2005, in his first professional season with the Greenville Grrrowl of the ECHL, he scored 21 goals and had 23 assists for the total of 44 points in 72 games. In those 72 games, he also got a total of 127 penalty minutes finishing 3rd for penalties.

On November 22, 2008, Sestito was called up to the Edmonton Oilers to make his first regular season NHL debut. He played his first regular season game on November 26, 2008 against the Los Angeles Kings. Sestito was the captain of the Oilers top minor hockey league affiliate, the Springfield Falcons of the American Hockey League, before being traded on July 9, 2009 to the New Jersey Devils from the Edmonton Oilers for a conditional draft choice.

On October 14, 2010, Sestito was called up to New Jersey to fill in for Brian Rolston and a depleted Devils roster.

On May 5, 2012, Sestito was called up to New Jersey to make his NHL playoff debut for the injured Ryan Carter during the team's 2012 Stanley Cup Conference Semifinals against the Philadelphia Flyers.

On July 15, 2015, Sestito announced he would be moving to the Kontinental Hockey League to play with the Dinamo Riga for the 2015–16 season. Sestito was named an assistant captain for the Dinamo Riga in his first season with the team.

== Personal life ==
Since retiring from professional hockey, Sestito has served as a fire fighter in his hometown of Rome, New York, with the Rome Fire Department. Sestito now coaches the Utica Jr Comets.

== Career statistics ==
			Regular season					Playoffs
Season	Team	League	GP	G	A	Pts	PIM	GP	G	A	Pts	PIM
2000–01	Syracuse Jr. Crunch	OPJHL	45	20	24	44	101	—	—	—	—	—
2001–02	Plymouth Whalers	OHL	51	10	11	21	40	6	0	0	0	0
2002–03	Plymouth Whalers	OHL	61	11	7	18	49	18	2	3	5	4
2003–04	Plymouth Whalers	OHL	57	10	20	30	68	9	4	1	5	14
2004–05	Plymouth Whalers	OHL	67	14	18	32	93	4	0	0	0	14
2004–05	Bridgeport Sound Tigers	AHL	9	2	1	3	12	—	—	—	—	—
2005–06	Greenville Grrrowl	ECHL	72	21	23	44	127	6	2	2	4	24
2006–07	Stockton Thunder	ECHL	66	13	13	26	132	6	2	1	3	6
2006–07	Wilkes-Barre/Scranton Penguins	AHL	4	0	0	0	6	—	—	—	—	—
2007–08	Springfield Falcons	AHL	77	7	10	17	175	—	—	—	—	—
2008–09	Springfield Falcons	AHL	51	5	3	8	77	—	—	—	—	—
2008–09	Edmonton Oilers	NHL	1	0	0	0	0	—	—	—	—	—
2009–10	Lowell Devils	AHL	66	18	17	35	38	5	0	0	0	8
2009–10	New Jersey Devils	NHL	9	0	1	1	2	—	—	—	—	—
2010–11	Albany Devils	AHL	23	5	8	13	28	—	—	—	—	—
2010–11	New Jersey Devils	NHL	36	0	2	2	9	—	—	—	—	—
2011–12	New Jersey Devils	NHL	18	0	0	0	7	1	0	0	0	0
2011–12	Albany Devils	AHL	45	9	10	19	127	—	—	—	—	—
2012–13	Albany Devils	AHL	67	7	16	23	106	—	—	—	—	—
2012–13	New Jersey Devils	NHL	6	0	0	0	2	—	—	—	—	—
2013–14	Albany Devils	AHL	51	13	14	27	79	4	0	0	0	6
2013–14	New Jersey Devils	NHL	16	0	3	3	2	—	—	—	—	—
2014–15	Albany Devils	AHL	58	10	15	25	79	—	—	—	—	—
2014–15	New Jersey Devils	NHL	15	0	2	2	33	—	—	—	—	—
2015–16	Dinamo Riga	KHL	50	19	4	23	52	—	—	—	—	—
2016–17	Dinamo Riga	KHL	53	7	5	12	75	—	—	—	—	—
AHL totals			451	76	94	170	727	9	0	0	0	14
NHL totals			101	0	8	8	55	1	0	0	0	0
