= Tom Sestito =

American ice hockey player (born 1987)

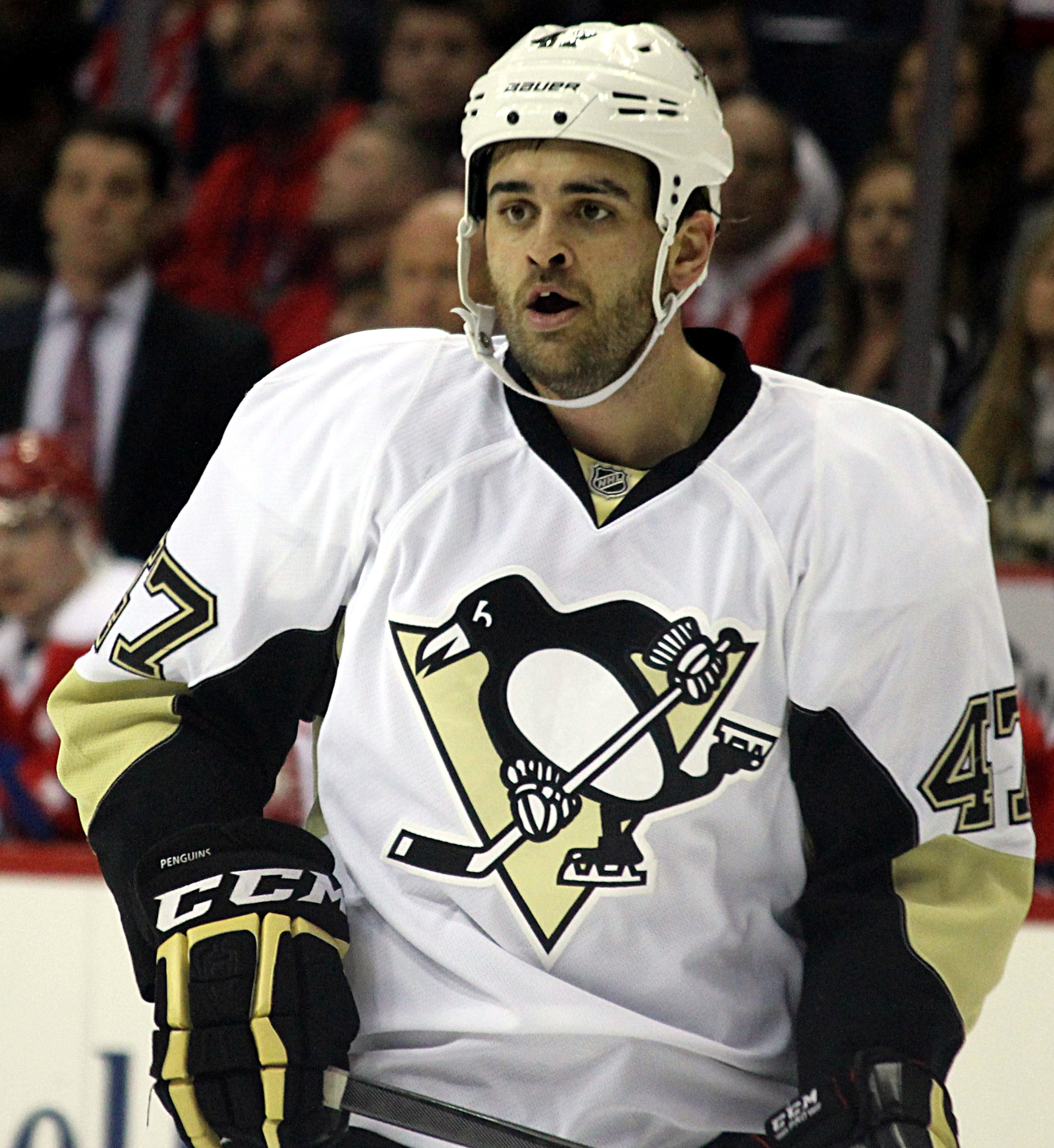
- Sestito with the Pittsburgh Penguins in 2016
- Born: September 28, 1987 (age 38) Rome, New York, U.S.
- Height: 6 ft 5 in (196 cm)
- Weight: 228 lb (103 kg; 16 st 4 lb)
- Position: Left wing
- Shot: Left
- Played for: Columbus Blue Jackets; Philadelphia Flyers; Sheffield Steelers; Vancouver Canucks; Pittsburgh Penguins
- NHL draft: 85th overall, 2006; Columbus Blue Jackets
- Playing career: 2007–2019

Tom Sestito (born September 28, 1987) is an American former professional ice hockey forward. He most recently played with the Toronto Marlies in the American Hockey League (AHL). He has previously played for the Columbus Blue Jackets, Philadelphia Flyers, Pittsburgh Penguins, and Vancouver Canucks in the National Hockey League (NHL).

== Playing career ==
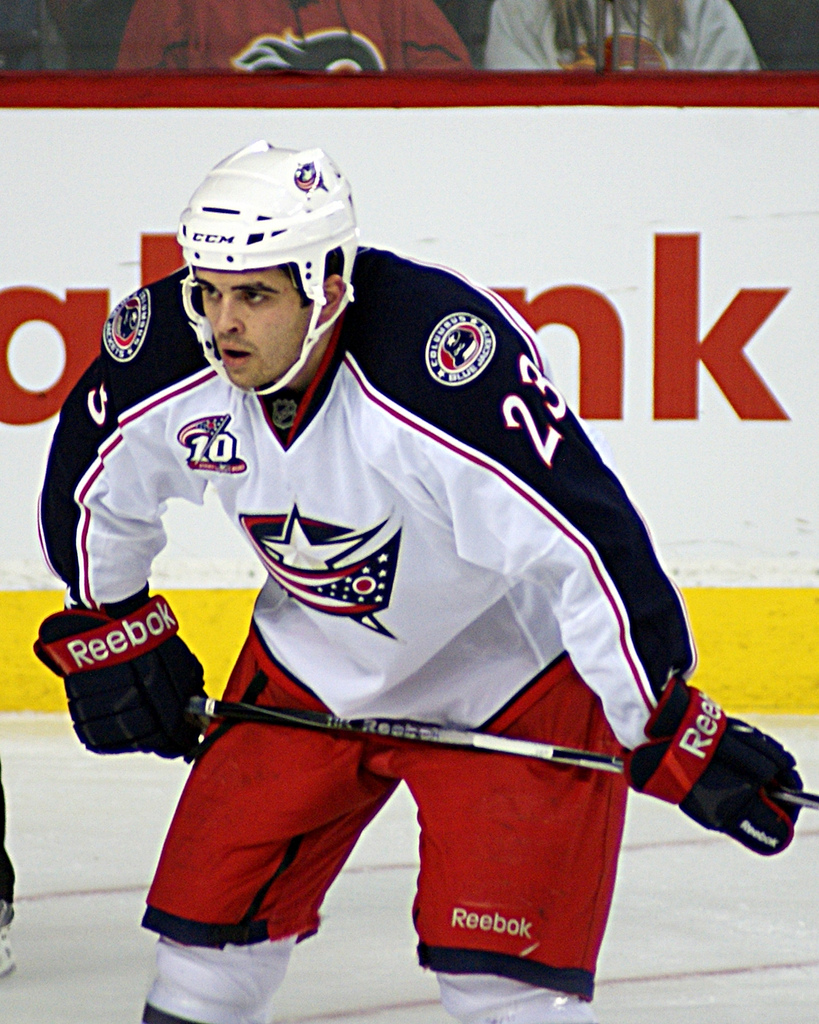
Sestito with the Columbus Blue Jackets

As a youth, Sestito played in the 2001 Quebec International Pee-Wee Hockey Tournament with a minor ice hockey team from Syracuse, New York.

Sestito was drafted 85th overall in the 2006 NHL entry draft by the Columbus Blue Jackets from the Plymouth Whalers of the Ontario Hockey League, where he had shown his potential by scoring 42 goals in the 2006–07 season with the Whalers.

Sestito signed a three-year, entry-level contract with the Blue Jackets on March 29, 2007. After playing with the Blue Jackets AHL affiliate, the Syracuse Crunch, Sestito made his NHL debut with Columbus in the last game of the 2007–08 season against the St. Louis Blues on April 6, 2008.

He scored his first NHL goal on December 15, 2010, against Roberto Luongo of the Vancouver Canucks in a 3–2 overtime loss. He scored his second NHL goal on December 23, 2010, against Cory Schneider, also of the Vancouver Canucks in a 7–3 losing effort. On February 28, 2011, the Blue Jackets traded Sestito to the Philadelphia Flyers in exchange for forwards Greg Moore and Michael Chaput.

On September 27, 2011, the Flyers placed him on waivers with the intention of having him play for their AHL affiliate, the Adirondack Phantoms.

On October 8, 2012, he signed for EIHL team Sheffield Steelers on a temporary contract during the 2012–13 NHL lockout, joining fellow NHL players Anthony Stewart and Drew Miller who were playing for Nottingham Panthers and Braehead Clan respectively.

On March 1, 2013, Sestito was claimed off waivers by the Vancouver Canucks and on May 29, 2013, he signed a two-year, one-way contract worth US$ 1.5 million.

In his first full NHL season (2013–14), Sestito led the league in penalty minutes with 213, edging out Chris Neil by 2. In the 2014–15 season, with the role of enforcer declining in importance in the NHL, Sestito appeared sparingly in only 3 games with the Canucks before he was reassigned to their AHL affiliate, the Utica Comets. On February 23, 2015, the Vancouver Canucks cut Sestito after 10 games with the Comets.

After sitting out the remainder of the season, Sestito accepted an invitation to attend the Pittsburgh Penguins's training camp on August 26, 2015. Pittsburgh did not offer Sestito a contract at the conclusion of camp, but was offered a try-out with AHL affiliate, the Wilkes-Barre/Scranton Penguins to begin the 2015–16 season on October 2, 2015. At the midpoint of the season, Sestito was signed by Pittsburgh to a one-year, two-way contract for the remainder of the year on February 1, 2016. He was immediately placed on waivers in order to continue to play in Wilkes-Barre.

Though Sestito was technically a member of the Penguins' 2017 Stanley Cup winning squad, he was ultimately not permitted to hoist the trophy after being a healthy scratch for the entirety of the team's playoff run.

As a free agent prior to the 2018–19 season, Sestito received an offer from an AHL team to continue playing. However, he chose to retire citing his family as his reason. On December 18, 2018, Sestito agreed to attempt a comeback, signing a professional tryout contract with the Toronto Marlies of the AHL, after he was approached by the club to add a physical presence.

=== Criticism ===
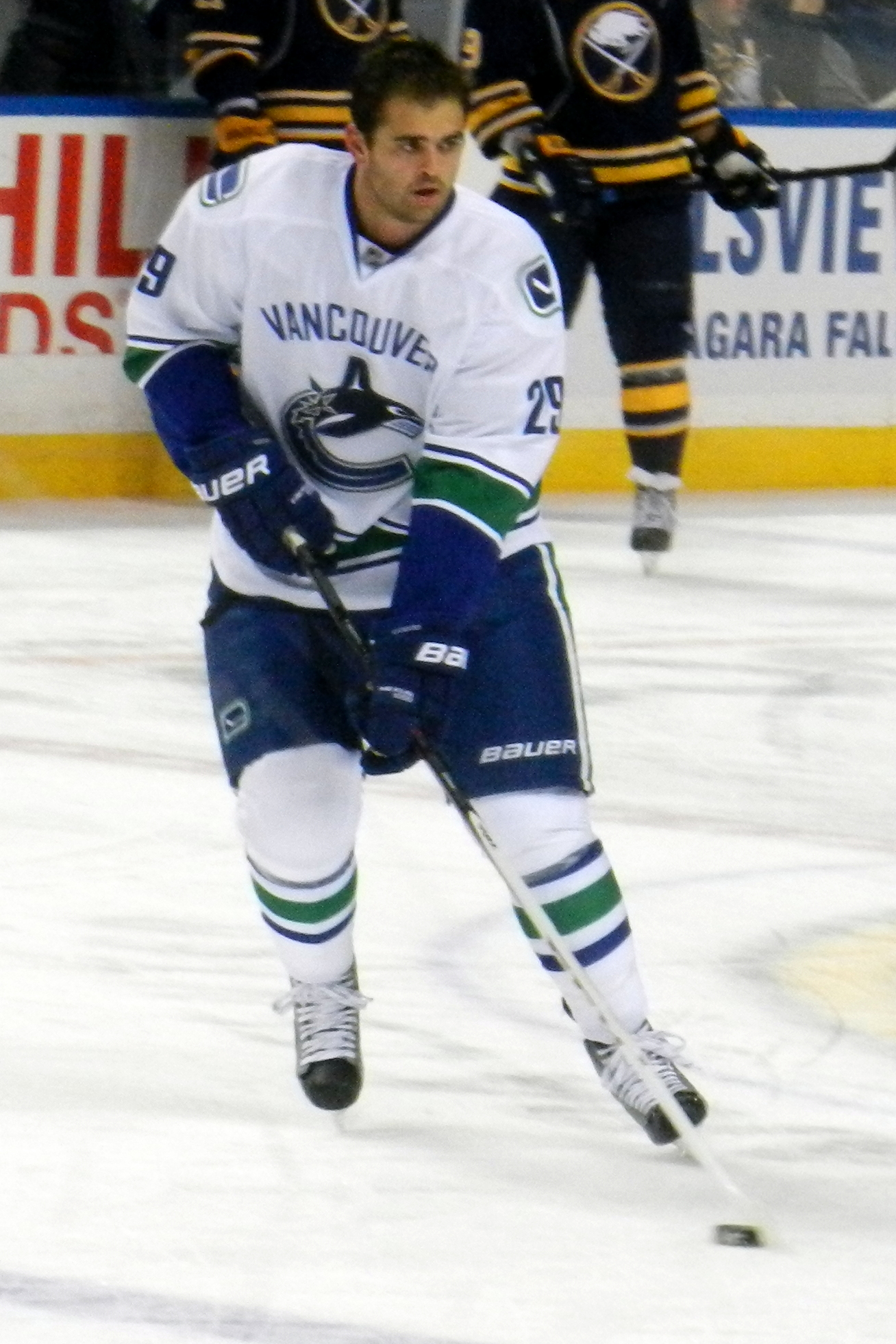
With the Canucks in 2013–14.

During his NHL career, Sestito was referred to as a "talentless thug" and as a "boxing hobo on skates" by ESPN commentator Keith Olbermann. The Hockey News referred to Sestito as a "goon with limited hockey talents", noting that he embodied a culture of violence and revenge which the modern game needs to move away from.

While with the Canucks, Sestito made headlines after accumulating twenty-seven combined penalty minutes while officially receiving only one second of total ice time in a game against the Los Angeles Kings on January 13, 2014. Afterwards, ESPN's Olbermann named Sestito "The Worst Person in the Sports World" on his show while stating that Sestito is "not a hockey player". Sestito's teenage sister, Victoria, subsequently attacked Olbermann via Twitter, claiming that "the $7,268 for 1 second of work" was "probably just a little bit more than your liberal left wing ass makes." She added that the Sestito family was looking forward to Olbermann losing his job.

Sestito's penchant for taking ill-advised penalties resulted in a somewhat messy departure from the Canucks organization. The Canucks ultimately announced that Sestito would receive his full pay but would no longer play for the Vancouver Canucks or Utica Comets. Canucks' General Manager Jim Benning stressed that his club needed players who could play in the opposition's end and contribute with more than an occasional fight. Sestito subsequently found work painting a friend's restaurant in Rome, NY.

In late 2014, Sestito received criticism for tweeting that police were justified in the shooting death of an 18-year-old unarmed African American man named Michael Brown. The shooting incident sparked mass riots in Ferguson, MO, and received international media attention. Sestito later deleted the tweets.

Former NHL player John Scott, MVP of the 2016 National Hockey League All-Star Game, said of Sestito in 2019, "I don’t like him. I have never liked him. I just don’t like how he plays the game." Scott noted that Sestito would typically only fight him when he had the opportunity to jump him from behind. "All through the AHL, I’d ask him to fight and he’d be like, 'My hand’s broken,' then he would fight someone else or this and that and he would duck me."

== Personal life ==
Sestito's older brother Tim, most recently a member of Dinamo Riga of the Kontinental Hockey League, retired in September 2017. He also has a younger sister named Victoria.

== Career statistics ==
Bold indicates led league

| | | | Regular season | | | | | Playoffs |
| Season | Team | League | GP | G | A | Pts | PIM | GP | G | A | Pts | PIM |
|---|---|---|---|---|---|---|---|---|---|---|---|---|
| 2002–03 | Syracuse Stars | EmJHL | 17 | 5 | 5 | 10 | 80 | — | — | — | — | — |
| 2003–04 | Syracuse Stars | EmJHL | 31 | 13 | 16 | 29 | 137 | 6 | 5 | 6 | 11 | 32 |
| 2004–05 | Plymouth Whalers | OHL | 35 | 1 | 3 | 4 | 88 | — | — | — | — | — |
| 2005–06 | Plymouth Whalers | OHL | 57 | 10 | 10 | 20 | 176 | 13 | 5 | 2 | 7 | 29 |
| 2006–07 | Plymouth Whalers | OHL | 60 | 42 | 22 | 64 | 135 | 19 | 11 | 6 | 17 | 57 |
| 2007–08 | Syracuse Crunch | AHL | 66 | 7 | 16 | 23 | 202 | 9 | 3 | 0 | 3 | 57 |
| 2007–08 | Columbus Blue Jackets | NHL | 1 | 0 | 0 | 0 | 17 | — | — | — | — | — |
| 2008–09 | Syracuse Crunch | AHL | 52 | 8 | 12 | 20 | 168 | — | — | — | — | — |
| 2009–10 | Syracuse Crunch | AHL | 36 | 10 | 7 | 17 | 138 | — | — | — | — | — |
| 2009–10 | Columbus Blue Jackets | NHL | 3 | 0 | 0 | 0 | 7 | — | — | — | — | — |
| 2010–11 | Springfield Falcons | AHL | 46 | 11 | 21 | 32 | 192 | — | — | — | — | — |
| 2010–11 | Columbus Blue Jackets | NHL | 9 | 2 | 2 | 4 | 40 | — | — | — | — | — |
| 2010–11 | Adirondack Phantoms | AHL | 11 | 2 | 1 | 3 | 45 | — | — | — | — | — |
| 2011–12 | Adirondack Phantoms | AHL | 34 | 9 | 8 | 17 | 120 | — | — | — | — | — |
| 2011–12 | Philadelphia Flyers | NHL | 14 | 0 | 1 | 1 | 83 | — | — | — | — | — |
| 2012–13 | Sheffield Steelers | EIHL | 17 | 8 | 11 | 19 | 69 | — | — | — | — | — |
| 2012–13 | Philadelphia Flyers | NHL | 7 | 2 | 0 | 2 | 12 | — | — | — | — | — |
| 2012–13 | Adirondack Phantoms | AHL | 1 | 0 | 0 | 0 | 2 | — | — | — | — | — |
| 2012–13 | Vancouver Canucks | NHL | 23 | 1 | 0 | 1 | 53 | 1 | 0 | 0 | 0 | 2 |
| 2013–14 | Vancouver Canucks | NHL | 77 | 5 | 4 | 9 | **213** | — | — | — | — | — |
| 2014–15 | Vancouver Canucks | NHL | 3 | 0 | 1 | 1 | 7 | — | — | — | — | — |
| 2014–15 | Utica Comets | AHL | 10 | 1 | 0 | 1 | 20 | — | — | — | — | — |
| 2015–16 | Wilkes–Barre/Scranton Penguins | AHL | 41 | 5 | 9 | 14 | 104 | 7 | 1 | 3 | 4 | 52 |
| 2015–16 | Pittsburgh Penguins | NHL | 4 | 0 | 1 | 1 | 19 | — | — | — | — | — |
| 2016–17 | Pittsburgh Penguins | NHL | 13 | 0 | 2 | 2 | 48 | — | — | — | — | — |
| 2016–17 | Wilkes–Barre/Scranton Penguins | AHL | 33 | 6 | 10 | 16 | 121 | 5 | 1 | 0 | 1 | 13 |
| 2017–18 | Wilkes–Barre/Scranton Penguins | AHL | 37 | 6 | 9 | 15 | 95 | 1 | 0 | 0 | 0 | 0 |
| 2018–19 | Toronto Marlies | AHL | 13 | 1 | 1 | 2 | 42 | — | — | — | — | — |
| AHL totals | | | 380 | 66 | 94 | 160 | 1249 | 22 | 3 | 5 | 8 | 122 |
| NHL totals | | | 154 | 10 | 11 | 21 | 499 | 1 | 0 | 0 | 0 | 2 |
